= The Experts (2024 film) =

- Theatrical release poster
- Directed by: Andre Chiew; Nazim Shah
- Written by: Joel Soh; Abhilash Chandra; Ayam Fared; Mamu Vies; Kyle Goonting
- Story by: Joel Soh
- Produced by: Joel Soh
- Starring: Aaron Aziz; Syafiq Kyle; Remy Ishak; Mimi Lana; Ray Dapdap
- Cinematography: Tan Teck Zee
- Edited by: Lee Pai Seang
- Music by: Ricky Lionardi
- Production companies: Astro Shaw; TGV Pictures; ZAK Capital; Blackflag
- Distributed by: Astro Shaw
- Release date: 23 May 2024 (Malaysia)
- Running time: 121 minutes
- Country: Malaysia
- Languages: Malay; English
- Box office: MYR 11 million

The Experts is a 2024 Malaysian Malay-language heist film directed by Andre Chiew and Nazim Shah with story by Joel Soh who also produced the film and Kyle Goonting, head of production and development at Astro Shaw. Co-produced and distributed by Astro Shaw and TGV Pictures, the film stars Aaron Aziz, Syafiq Kyle, Remy Ishak, Mimi Lana and Ray Dapdap as family members.

The film began its development in 2022 after Movement Control Order was ended due to COVID-19 pandemic. It was originally planned in 2019 after completed Polis Evo 3 script but was abandoned for two years. The film later ran its photography in Kuala Lumpur especially in Sheraton Imperial as the main place. The film will released in Malaysia and Singapore on 23 May 2024 in conjunction with school holiday.

== Premise ==
After a decade of hard-earned peace, ex-criminal siblings are ruthlessly dragged back into their treacherous past. A notorious gangster's blackmail forces them into a heart-pounding heist, where old grudges ignite, and a shocking family tragedy resurfaces. As the shadows of their criminal history engulf them, loyalties fray, and survival hangs in the balance. Will they outsmart their ruthless enemy and protect the family, or will this desperate job tear them apart forever?

== Cast ==
- Aaron Aziz as Farid, big brother and family leader. Farid is better known as Along and The Mastermind
- Syafiq Kyle as Khairul (Keyrol). Keyrol is better known as The Heist
- Remy Ishak as Amiruddin (Amer). Amer is better known as The Charmer
- Mimi Lana as Emma. Emma is better known as The Getaway Driver
- Shah Reza Mohd Shah (Ray Dapdap) as Rozland (Lan). Lan is better known as The IT Guy and Angah, second big brother
- Maya Karin as Miranda, a mafia disguised as hotel manager for 5 Ivory
- Tony Eusoff as Bashir Rahman
- Wan Hanafi Su as Jaafar
- Jay Iswazir as Glasses
- Douglas Lim as Ah Teck
- Hasnul Rahmat as Badhar

For special appearances, Michael Ang cast as Chef Juan, lead chef in Sheraton Imperial hotel, Yuka Kharisma who performed "Cinta Indah Buat Kanda" for this film made her cameo as Jazz SInger in the hotel, Aziz M. Osman as film director and Soffi Jikan as himself. Meynillen Thamil Selvan and Zen Ng who previously appears in Sheriff as detective duo of Naga and Hong appears in the film as gangsters (Meynillen together with Ahmad Fahmi play the same role) and Bashir's bodyguard. Muhammad Al-Fudhail Anwar was cast as additional cast (Truck Driver).

== Production ==
The Experts is the fourth film produced by Blackflag after the succession of Polis Evo trilogy with Astro Shaw. It will be Andre Chiew and Nazim Shah's second directional for either of them which Andre previously co-directed with Joel Soh (Polis Evo 2) and Nazim (J2: J Retribusi) with Nazrul Asraff Mahzan, art director for the film. This is a second film project between Syafiq Kyle and Mimi Lana and the first in five years since Razaisyam Rashid's Pusaka (2019). Other cast are Aaron Aziz who previously dropped in The Original Gangster film by Syamsul Yusof, Remy Ishak who will portray as Shamsir in Keluang Man by 2025 and Shah Reza Mohd Shah who is a radio announcer at Era, previously become actor in Sangkar (2019). Other notable cast are Maya Karin, Tony Eusoff, Wan Hanafi Su (previously appears in Polis Evo), Jay Iswazir and Hasnul Rahmat from Polis Evo 2 with comedian Douglas Lim and film director Michael Ang (Polis Evo 3).

=== Filming ===
Before filming began in 2021, Syafiq Kyle cut his hair 20 days before shooting by the period of intensive training. His hair was long due to barber shop closed with the rise of COVID-10 pandemic. Aaron Aziz told Astro Awani that every cast of the film joined acting training led by Ayam Fared not to sharped their skills but for find chemistry prior filming.

For Remy Ishak, tango dance was a challenge for him as he have six camera angles with 100 extras appears around him for his scene dancing with Maya Karin. Maya also took training session for tango dance in six weeks. Remy later thanked Maya for help him teach dancing. Ray Dapdap, who portrays Lan which is a hacker told Astro Gempak that he have to trained and remember all of the coding to ensure it wasn't a cliché coding and for Andre Chiew's request's. Mimi Lana meanwhile was sad for one week after she forced to cut her hair to success for the film. She told media that she have to take time to accept short hair for two photography session (including Framed, created by Kyle Goonting).

The filming was run for a whole 2021 year until February 2022 for main photography in Kuala Lumpur such as Sheraton Imperial. The filming was later extended in July 2022.

== Release and reception ==
=== Release ===
The film was originally scheduled to be released in December 2023 by the name of Mamak Gang (The Experts) but was pushed to May 2024 together with Baik Punya Ah Long, thus pushed PAPA Game On to release in 2025. First teaser of the film was exclusively released in January 2024 through Astro Shaw and Astro Gempak's social media. The cast was revealed in video version on 15 April 2024 through YouTube. The trailer was released by Astro Shaw, Astro Gempak and TGV Cinemas through social media on 30 April 2024, edited by Zoul Zaaba with trailer music by Weslly Lona and performed by Arieff Zaini from Rosak FM. It officially confirmed the release in Malaysia on 23 May 2024 with 13 rating by LPF. The film was released in Shaw Theatres and Cathay for Singapore market on same day.

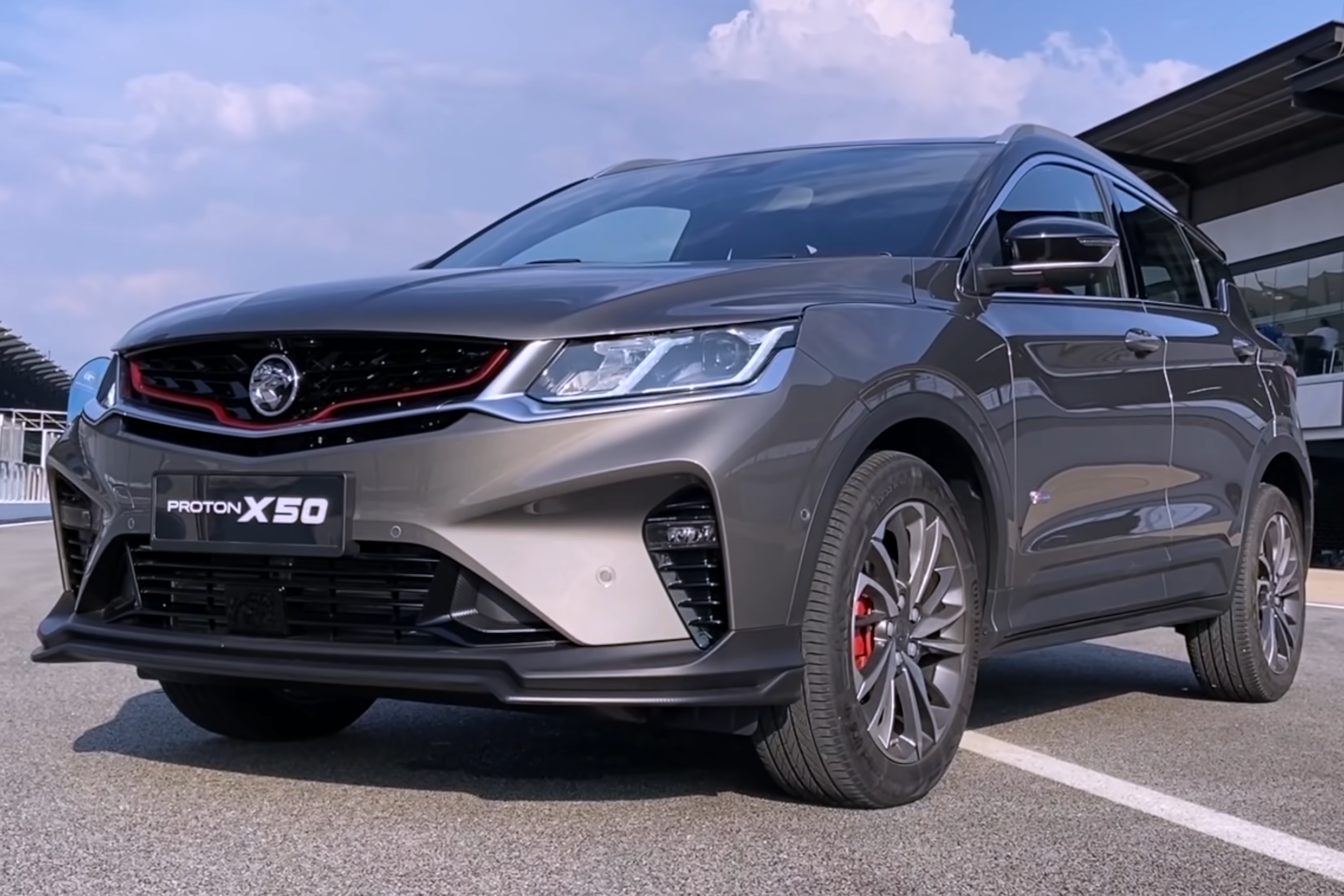
Proton X50 as pictured by media featured for Raya campaign by Mirinda.

=== Marketing ===
Astro Shaw and Etika announce their partnership through Mirinda for The Experts Selamatkan Raya, directed by Ezrie Gazali and Calpis Soda for Operasi Fizz. The collaboration was aimed to expand Astro Shaw into other ventures. The marketing features main prize of Proton X50 for first place in "Riang Raya bersama Mirinda" campaign.

Astro Shaw and Astro Gempak in collaboration with Calpis Soda promote an exclusive event called "Heist the Truck" campaign that offers you to win up to RM30,000. The campaign ran for 3 days in IOI City Mall, Setia City Mall and Aeon Seremban 2.

== Music ==
"Cinta Indah Buat Kanda"

Single by Yuka Kharisma
- Released: April 30, 2024
- Length: 2:50
- Label: Rocketfuel Entertainment
- Songwriter: Muzaffar Shah (Muzza)
- Producer: Sharon Paul

The film was supported by 3 original soundtracks with the courtesy of Rocektfuel Entertainment. The first song title "Cinta Indah Buat Kanda" performed by Yuka Kharisma with Muzaffar Shah written the song

There were also two songs added to the film titled "Melayar" performed, written and produced by Pitahati who previously composed Nova film by Nik Amir Mustapha and "Pakar!" performed and lyrics by Arieff Zaini (AYZE!) and Donrealla with music by Weslly Lona and produced by Zoul Zaaba, inspired from the Arcane series by Riot Games. The song was used in trailer with the help of Zoul's sound effects editing.
