= Polis Evo (film series) =

Film series created by Astro Shaw

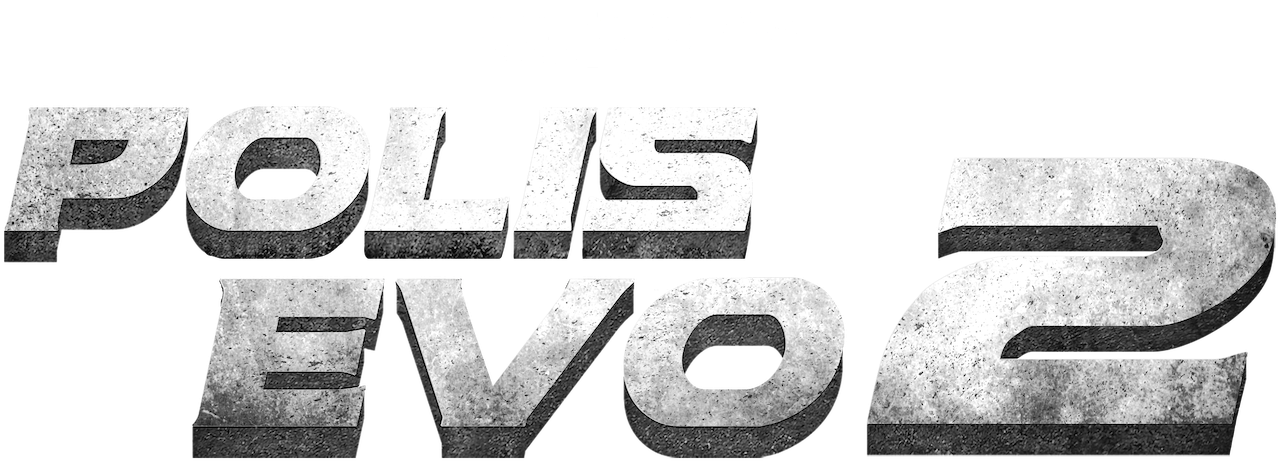
- Official logo for Polis Evo 2
- Directed by: Ghaz Abu Bakar (1); Joel Soh (2); Andre Chiew (2); Syafiq Yusof (3)
- Written by: Joel Soh (1-3); Kyle Goonting (1-3); Anwari Ashraf (1-3); Adib Zaini (1); Salman Aristo (2); Alfie Palermo (2); Choong Chi-Ren (2); Azhar Amirulhisyam (2); Abhilash Chnadra (3); Bernice Low (3)
- Produced by: Joel Soh
- Cinematography: Harris Hue Abdullah (1); Tan Teck Zee (2); Jordan Chiam (3)
- Edited by: Nazim Shah
- Music by: Luka Kuncevic (1-2); Paul Morrison (2); Lo Shi Seng (3)
- Production companies: Astro Shaw; Blackflag; Tayangan Unggul (1); Surya Citra Media (2); Skop Productions (3); TGV Pictures (3)
- Distributed by: Astro Shaw
- Release dates: September 17, 2015 (1); November 22, 2018 (2); May 25, 2023
- Running time: 375 minutes
- Country: Malaysia
- Language: Malay
- Budget: RM16.04 million
- Box office: RM95.19 million

Polis Evo is a Malaysian buddy cop action comedy film series, created by Joel Soh (who served as producer), Kyle Goonting and Anwari Ashraf, who previously became an Astro Scholarship Students. The film series are produced and distributed by Astro Shaw and features Shaheizy Sam as Khairul/Inspector Khai and Zizan Razak as Hassani/Inspector Sani.

The trilogy set various box office records in Malaysia. The first film in the series, Polis Evo (2015) became the number one film in Malaysia for 2 years. It also featured in Top 10 Google Most Searched Malaysian in September 2015. Its sequel, Polis Evo 2 (2018) were subjected with controversy when it was alleged to contain scenes offensive to Islam led to boycott movement by Dr Riduan Md Nor, PAS Committee head. Eventually, the film was praised for their theme and Hasnul Rahmat's performance. The final film, Polis Evo 3 (2023) sets the record for the biggest opening on opening day, 4 days and a week record, was praised for actors' performance especially Farali Khan and Sharnaaz Ahmad.

Polis Evo is the number one franchise series in Malaysia of all time, having grossed over RM95.16 million worldwide after the third film was released on 25 May 2023.

== Background ==
Following an all-time low for Malay-language film, Astro Scholarship Program Student's led by Joel Soh, Kyle Goonting and Anwari Ashraf Hashim returned from their alma mater; began written the script for the film in 2014. Joel Soh reveals that the scriptwriter of the prequel (Joel, Goonting, Anwari and Adib Zaini) chose the EVO word by the meaning of "evolution of police's image to the cinema." Script of the film was revealed to have 180-page that almost same as novel. Ghaz Abu Bakar, who known for directed Cicak Man 3; appointed as director for the prequel. Ghaz reveals that he directed the film "not made for film festivals." He also decided to reduce comedy scenes to respecting Royal Malaysia Police.

The prequel began its principal photography in Terengganu and Kuala Lumpur around September 2014 with Shaheizy Sam and Zizan Razak were chosen to play buddy cop duo to balance out action and comedy. The other characters were later cast throughout the shooting period while Hushairi Husain and Amerul Affendi entering the film.

For second film, Joel Soh was appointed as director; thus replacing Ghaz from the first film with Erra Fazira, Raline Shah and Hairul Azreen join the forces while Sam and Zizan reprised their role from the prequel. Zizan reported unwell and was later injured during making his own stunt. After few weeks, Riz Amin also reported injured in the set and was sent home for recovery with the help of Zizan who just returned to set. The film shoots in Pahang and some places in Hulu Langat and Kuala Lumpur in the end of 2017.

For the final and third film, Syafiq Yusof who just ending the principal photography of Abang Long Fadil 3; appointed as director in September 2019 replacing Joel Soh and Andre Chiew who worked as producer together. Zizan and Sam reprise their roles once again for the trilogy with Sharnaaz Ahmad entered the franchise by casting through Joel himself instead of Aslam Yusoff. Farali Khan (who was previously cast for Wira), Syafiq Kyle and Douglas Lim later entering the franchise throughout casting with Nora Danish and Eyka Farhana returning after a hiatus from second film. Zizan once again unwell after infected by Influenza A virus right after ending the shooting.

After three films, Raja Jastina Raja Arshad announced that the spin-off film on its way to expand the franchise without focusing on just Sani and Khai.

== Films ==
Film	Release date	Directed by	Written by	Screenplay by / story by	Produced by	Status
Polis Evo	September 17, 2015	Ghaz Abu Bakar	Joel Soh, Kyle Goonting, Anwari Ashraf Hashim & Adib Zaini	Joel Soh, Kyle Goonting, Anwari Ashraf Hashim & Adib Zaini	Joel Soh	Released
Polis Evo 2	November 22, 2018	Joel Soh & Andre Chiew	Joel Soh, Kyle Goonting & Anwari Ashraf	Joel Soh, Kyle Goonting & Anwari Ashraf	Joel Soh	Released
Polis Evo 3	May 25, 2023	Syafiq Yusof	Joel Soh, Kyle Goonting, Anwari Ashraf, Abhilash Chandra & Bernice Low	Joel Soh (story) & Faqihin Mohd Fazlin (screenplay)	Joel Soh	Released

Polis Evo logo that got rejected for marketing purpose by Royal Malaysia Police

=== Polis Evo (2015) ===
Inspector Khai, a police officer with the rank of Inspector in Kuala Lumpur has been assigned to investigate and solve the drug case involving drug trafficking operations in Terengganu. Although this case is related to the case handled by Inspector Khai before, he has to cooperate with Inspector Sani who is on duty in Terengganu because Inspector Sani is more knowledgeable about the intricacies of the state of his birth. However, they both have different personalities; Inspector Khai is strict and often acts agile and this character is very different from Inspector Sani, who follows procedures and protocols more. The incompatibility made their mission almost fail. Everything changed when the criminal leader, Izrail, began to involve Inspector Sani's family in this case. Inspector Khai and Inspector Sani now realize they need to learn to work together to complete their mission.

=== Polis Evo 2 (2018) ===
Three years after the events of the first film, Inspector Sani and Khai are now involved in an espionage mission on a remote island on the east coast. The atmosphere turned cloudy when a group of terrorists led by Hafsyam Jauhari attacked and captured the Cherong Island, Pahang. Sani was held by the terrorist group along with 200 villagers who were held hostage, while Khai was trapped in the village area. Sani tried to fight the leader of the terrorist group from inside the detention center after witnessing the group's violence. Khai managed to find a spy policeman from Indonesia and 4 members of the special forces sent by the Malaysian government. These seven together took on the most bitter challenge in their career as police to defeat Hafsyam Jauhari and his group and rescue more than 200 hostages on the island.

=== Polis Evo 3 (2023) ===
After the incident on the island, Inspector Sani and Inspector Khai returned to work at IPD Kuala Terengganu. While preparing for Sani's wedding, Reza carried out a bomb attack in Penang which caused a policeman and dozens of civilians to be killed in the crash. Sani and Khai are called to work together in Ops Siong with Inspector Dani, Inspector Julie and Inspector Dell who have their own expertise. The ops was led by ACP Farouk. However, there was a horrific memory in the past that played in Khai's mind when he found out that the suspect he was looking for was his own former colleague. He is aware that he has a responsibility as a policeman.

== Cast and crew ==
List indicator

This section includes characters who will appear or have appeared in more than two films in the series.

- An empty grey cell indicates the character was not in the film, or that the character's official presence has not yet been confirmed.

Character	Film		
Character	Polis EVO	Polis EVO 2	Polis EVO 3
Khairul / Inspector Khai	Shaheizy Sam	Shaheizy Sam	Shaheizy Sam
Hassani / Inspector Sani	Zizan Razak	Zizan Razak	Zizan Razak
Anis	Nora Danish		Nora Danish
Yati	Eyka Farhana		Eyka Farhana
Maya Adli Hashim	Mimi Ernida		
ACP Mokhtar	Harun Salim Bachik		
Izrail	Hushairy Hussein		
Jimbo	Pablo Amirul		
Jemang	Azliyuszaini Mohd Noor		
Mat Yam	Amerul Affendi		
Lance Corporal Sofian	Ungku Hariz		
Adli Hashim	Wan Hanafi Su		
Rian		Raline Shah	
Hafsyam Jauhari / Saif		Hasnul Rahmat	
Najr		Mike Lucock	
Riky Kumalo		Tanta Ginting	
SAC Dato' Azizat Mansor		Erra Fazira	
Sargeant Mat Dan		Shafie Naswip	
Sargeant Amin Galah		Riz Amin	
Qalif		Soffi Jikan	
Zul		Hairul Azreen	
Mikael		Fir Rahman	
Commander Maarof		Rusdi Ramli	
Khalid		Hairie Othman	
Agnes		Jasper Supayah	
Zairi		Jay Iswazir	
Reza			Sharnaaz Ahmad
Inspector Dani			Syafiq Kyle
Inspector Dell			Douglas Lim
ACP Farouq			Fauzi Nawawi
Inspector Julie			Farali Khan
Inspector Faizal			Fezrul Khan
Chao			Michael Ang

=== Additional crew ===
Film	Crew / Detail					
Film	Composer(s)	Cinematographer(s)	Editor(s)	Production companies	Distributing company	Running time
Polis Evo	Luka Kuncevic	Harris Hue Abdullah	Nazim Shah	Astro Shaw & Blackflag	Astro Shaw	124 minutes
Polis Evo 2	Luka Kuncevic; Paul Morrison	Tan Teck Zee	Nazim Shah	Astro Shaw & Blackflag	Astro Shaw	138 minutes
Polis Evo 3	Lo Shi Seng	Jordan Chiam	Nazim Shah	Astro Shaw & Blackflag	Astro Shaw	113 minutes

== Production ==
=== Development ===
Filming for the franchise began around 2014.

Najwa Abu Bakar served as executive producer for the first film. Gayatri Su-Lin Pillai (Tayangan Unggul) and Imyllia Roslan (Astro Shaw) served as co-producers for respective company. After Najwa ends her tenure in Astro Shaw, executive producers took over by Dato' Khairul Anwar Salleh, Henry Tan, Agnes Rozario and Christinne Lim for second film. Others are Wicky V. Olindo and Sukhdev Singh while Carrie Wong served as associate producer. Raja Jastina Raja Arshad took over the third film and announced that spin-off on its way after concluding the Sani-Khai journey.

=== Directors ===
Ghaz Abu Bakar directed the first film (Polis Evo), despite been nominated in Malaysia Film Festival, Joel Soh took over the second film and appointed Andre Chiew, who previously worked as freelance assistant director; become the co-director. The film become even more serious and take it to next level with their direction. Syafiq Yusof appointed as director for the third film after controversy that occurs in the previous film; thus returned as action comedy genre.

=== Scripts ===
Joel Soh, Kyle Goonting and Anwari Ashraf Hashim has contributed by written the script for all three films. Adib Zaini later entered as the co-scriptwriter. For the second film, Alfie Palermo, Azhar Amirulhisyam and Choong Chi-Ren co-written the second film from their respective company and Salman Aristo entered the writers' room for Indonesian language dialogue. Abhilash Chandra and Bernice Low joined the writers' room for the third film. Abhilash confirmed on his Instagram that the third film was written from February to August 2019.

=== Casting ===
Casting has been led by Aslam Yusoff for all three films. Once the buddy duo confirmed, the main antagonist were cast throughout filming. Amerul Affendi was chosen to play as soft character who also as worked as double informant. Hushairi Husain later become an antagonist as the director want to approach in Breaking Bad-style which Ghaz was actually fan of.

For the sequel, Raline Shah has joined the cast based on the clue from Shaheizy Sam's Instagram. Hasnul Rahmat cast as main antagonist as taking huge approach in storytelling more serious. Besides two new characters, Erra Fazira, Hairul Azreen, Riz Amin, Syafie Naswip and other caster were joined as additional characters. Background characters were cast by the end of January 2017 and received huge admission of 1,500 audience.

Casting for the third film began in 2019. Sharnaaz Ahmad was chosen by Joel Soh himself for the main antagonist. Joel also chose Farali Khan as originally, the sniper woman was supposed to be in second film, only to be removed from the script. Douglas Lim, Syafiq Kyle, Michael Ang and other casts joined prior to the shooting.

=== Filming ===
First film entering their principal photography in September 2014 in Terengganu as the main context and some areas in Kuala Lumpur, months before Harun Salim Bachik died in March 2015. His wife reveals that this was one of Harun's last wish before he died. Ghaz Abu Bakar revealed that he was supposed to be in his next film, Angin Cinta a day after his death. Harun was later credited 'in memory of' right before the credit rolls.

Second film began the filming by the end of 2017 and ended in January 2018 in Pahang and some areas in Klang Valley, mainly in Hulu Langat and Kuala Lumpur. Zizan Razak was unwell and later injured for trying his own stunt. Few weeks after, Riz Amin also injured and was escorted home by Zizan who returned from set. Post-production were made in Thailand by Kantana Group with additional visual effects were also made by the same company.

Third film began the principal photography in November 2019 to January 2020 in Terengganu and Klang Valley, with Cheras Stadium was used as stand-in for Sultan Mizan Zainal Abidin Stadium due to renovation that were made.there. Faqihin Mohd Fazlin later joined as screenplay for the film right after the release of Ejen Ali: The Movie (released prior to the film shooting). He revealed three days after the official trailer released. Post-production were run in newly renovated Astro Sound+ Vision technology after the acquired by Astro to Basecamp Films.

== Reception ==
Film	Release date	Box office gross		Box office ranking	Budget	References
Film	Release date	Malaysia	Worldwide	Malaysia	Budget	References
Polis Evo	September 17, 2015	RM17.74 million	RM18 million	15	RM2.8 million	
Polis Evo 2	November 22, 2018	RM22.45 million	RM23 million	13	RM8 million	
Polis Evo 3	May 25, 2023	RM50.11 million	RM54 million	2	RM6 million	

All of Polis Evo films finished first in the first weekend domestically. As of February 2024, Polis Evo become number one film franchise in Malaysia.

== Music ==
Title	Release date	Length	Artists	Label	Film
"EVO"	August 3, 2015	4:17	Joe Flizzow and SonaOne	MEASAT Broadcast Network, Astro Shaw and Tayangan Unggul	Polis Evo
"Sang Saka Biru"	October 14, 2018	3:22	Joe Flizzow, Alif Abdullah (ALYPH), Altimet and SonaOne	Rocketfuel Entertainment	Polis Evo 2
"Mogok (Apa Kau Berani)"	November 2, 2018	3:35	Emmett (Emmett Ishak)	Rocketfuel Entertainment	Polis Evo 2
"Ayuh"	April 13, 2023	3:58	Malique, Kmy Kmo, Aman RA and Ernie Zakri	Rocketfuel Entertainment	Polis Evo 3

== See also ==
- Action comedy genre
- Buddy cop
