= Keluang Man (film) =

2025 Astro Shaw film

- Official theatrical poster
- Directed by: Anwari Ashraf
- Written by: Anwari Ashraf; Roshfaizal Ariffin; Luqman Sheikh Ghazali; Natasha Azlan; Zulaikha Zakaria
- Based on: Keluang Man by Kamn Ismail
- Produced by: Fadzlie Muthafa; Mia Aynor
- Starring: Nas-T; Remy Ishak; Rosyam Nor; Anwaar Beg Moghal; Shweta Sekhon
- Cinematography: Zulkefli Zain
- Edited by: Irwan Ahmad
- Music by: Andrew Bong
- Production companies: Astro Shaw; Pasal Productions; Golden Screen Cinemas; Idea River Run
- Distributed by: Astro Shaw
- Release date: 29 May 2025 (Malaysia)
- Running time: 137 minutes
- Country: Malaysia
- Languages: Malay; English; Punjabi
- Budget: RM 13 million
- Box office: RM 3.86 million

Keluang Man is a 2025 Malaysian superhero film based on the eponymous Malaysian animated series by UAS Animation Studio. Produced by Astro Shaw and Pasal Productions, it is a live-action film based on the animated series created by the late Kamn Ismail, and will be the first fully live-action film from a Malaysian animation series of the 1990s. The film is directed, written and produced by Anwari Ashraf, who co-wrote it with Roshfaizal Ariffin, Luqman Sheikh Ghazali, Natasha Azlan and Zulaikha Zakaria. It stars Nas-T as Borhan, Remy Ishak as Shamsir, Rosyam Nor as Ahmad and Anwaar Beg Moghal as Inspector Sahab.

The film was in planning by Astro Shaw Writers' Room since 2019, led by Anwari and Roshfaizal. Development began in May 2023, when Anwari revealed the front page of the script through his social media. Nas-T was chosen as the main character through casting on social media from July to August 2023. Principal photography ran from May 2024 to July 2024, after the Eid al-Fitr month on Bandar Malaysia TUDM, Kluang, Johor, Perak and Klang Valley.

A follow-up, Keluang Man: The Series, is currently in production and will be released as part of the Astro Originals.

== Plot ==
Borhan, a mentally challenged man who was sold off by his parents for child trafficking during childhood, has become a mercenary after being saved and adopted by Ahmad, and he resides at Tampoi Mental Hospital as one of the mental patients after a brain injury. When visited by Doctor Malini in cognitive therapy after being taken back following another escape, Borhan struggles to remember his past, aside from a few occasions with his former brothers-in-arms, Shamsir, for killing Ahmad.

Borhan later observed Shamsir and his gang requesting Doctor Ramu to discharge two patients from the hospital. He then decided to follow them, donning makeshift masked vigilante attire crafted from various clothing items. While unable to stop the gang, Borhan trailed Shamsir and uncovered their plan to use the discharged patients as human bombs in an attack on a restaurant, intended as a threat to the police force, led by Inspector Sahab, who is determined to bring Shamsir to justice.

Borhan seeks help from Doctor Ramu at his home on how to deal with Shamsir's gang. Deciding to become a costumed vigilante to take down the other gangs, Borhan earns the nickname "Keluang Man" from spectators who witness his heroics. During a raid on Mata Panda's hidden weapons facility, which is located inside a pillow factory, Keluang Man encounters Sahab before tracking down Shamsir. Ultimately, Borhan confronts Shamsir for the murder of Ahmad.

After tossing Shamsir into an urban stream, Borhan celebrates his victory until the Mata Batu gang raids the Mentai Hospital to eliminate Borhan. As the patients and the doctors escape, the leader of the Mata Batu gang, who turns out to be none other than Ahmad, encounters and attacks his former subordinate, which causes him to remember his past properly. As one of the gang members plants the time bomb, he is stopped by Inspector Sahab until Ahmad manually detonates it, killing the subordinate and injuring Sahab.

Feeling remorseful about his actions and the negative publicity surrounding his Keluang Man identity after the attack, Borhan went to the hospital where the injured Sahab was being treated to offer his apologies. Doctor Malini, who visited her brother and was aware of Borhan's superhero identity, encouraged him to take responsibility for his actions and make amends.

Keluang Man defeated Ahmad's goons at the shipping port before confronting Shamsir again. However, Ahmad fired a rocket launcher at both of them, fatally injuring Shamsir. Enraged by Ahmad's actions, Keluang Man ultimately defeats him, causing Ahmad to lose his prosthetic eye before he is taken into custody by the police. With the public's faith in Keluang Man restored, Borhan continues his heroic vigilantism.

In the mid-credits sequence, Borhan contemplated getting a sidekick (Note: Identified as Tiong Man, Keluang Man's future sidekick.), with him using his pet stray cat as an example.

== Cast ==
- Nas-T as Borhan/Keluang Man
  - Umar Shakur as Young Borhan (child)
- Remy Ishak as Shamsir
  - Danish Zamri as Young Shamsir
- Rosyam Nor as Ahmad/Mata Batu, Borhan's silat teacher
- Anwaar Beg Moghal as Inspector Sahab
- Shweta Sekhon as Doctor Malini, a doctor who takes care of Borhan's mental health condition
- Halim Othman as Halim Othman
- Dennis Yin as Sergeant Chen
- Amelia Henderson as Kathy Ismail
- Sham Sunder as Dr. Ramoo
- Farhaziq Abdul Manaf as Zaim
- Yank Kassim as Paan Palang
- Naim Daniel as Samad
- Shahrol Shiro as Ated
- Daniella Sya as rape victim
- Mierul Aiman as polieceman
- Nadhir Nasar as the Leader of the Basket Eye Gang
- Azlee Jaafar as Mentally ill
- Wahid Senario as Mentally ill
- Said Prono as Mentally ill
- A. Galak as Zakaria
- Delimawati as Hantu Kak Limah (special appearance, teasing the Astro Shaw Cinematic Universe)

== Production ==
=== Development ===
Rumors of a live-action adaptation began on 2017 when Yahoo! News reporting that Rizal Halim was announced as director for the film with the support of Aziz M. Osman as producer by the title of Keluang Man Zero. It was eventually cancelled after Rizal himself left the production in April 2018 for unknown reasons. Rizal apologized to everyone including Indonesian and Singapore actors due to their excitement for acting in the film.

Official development began in 2019, when Astro Shaw Writers' Room planned to make a live-action film led by Anwari Ashraf, who has written Polis Evo franchise with Joel Soh, current managing director of Blackflag and Kyle Goonting, head of production and development in Astro Shaw and created two Astro Original Series, Projek: High Council and Projek: Anchor SPM, together with Roshfaizal Ariffin, who is known for writing and directing Didi & Friends The Movie. Nas Muammar Zar or also known as Nas-T was confirmed as Keluang Man, through casting conducted by Astro Shaw via social media in July 2023, while it also got high volume of auditions and reactions from Nizam Razak, Naim Daniel (Note: He eventually came to the set in Kluang on 28 June 2024.) and various media outlets. The auditions were later on extended until August 2023. Anwari was hired as a director and main writer of the film. The film will be an origin story of Keluang Man and will be aiming for a 2025 release together with Kahar: Kapla High Council and BoBoiBoy Movie 3: Gur'latan, (Note: It was originally titled BoBoiBoy: Movie 3 but was changed due to ongoing production of BoBoiBoy Galaxy Season 2 and Papa Zola: The Movie.) that was scheduled for December of same year.

Before Astro Shaw continued their project, it struck up a partnership with Iconic Animation Studio, the original IP of Keluang Man. The partnership were signed in Astro's HQ in Bukit Jalil in May 2022 with the attendance of Raja Jastina Raja Arshad, executive producer of the film. Raja Jastina told The Vibes;

"We trust that the Keluang Man brand is highly esteemed in the local animation scene and has its loyal following, many of which who grew up with the animation series.

"Even though the series first aired a long time ago, it is still beloved by many Malaysians, and we see high demand and huge anticipation from the fans for the return of Keluang Man, proving that this superhero has a special place in the audiences’ hearts and is indeed evergreen.

"We hope that this good news would excite the fans and show that local animation has the potential to be elevated to greater heights.”

— Raja Jastina Raja Arshad

The film was announced on 28 November 2023 by Astro Shaw. The film will be released in 2025 together with BoBoiBoy Movie 3, produced by Animonsta Studios. Both movies will also be distributed by Animonsta.

=== Pre-production ===
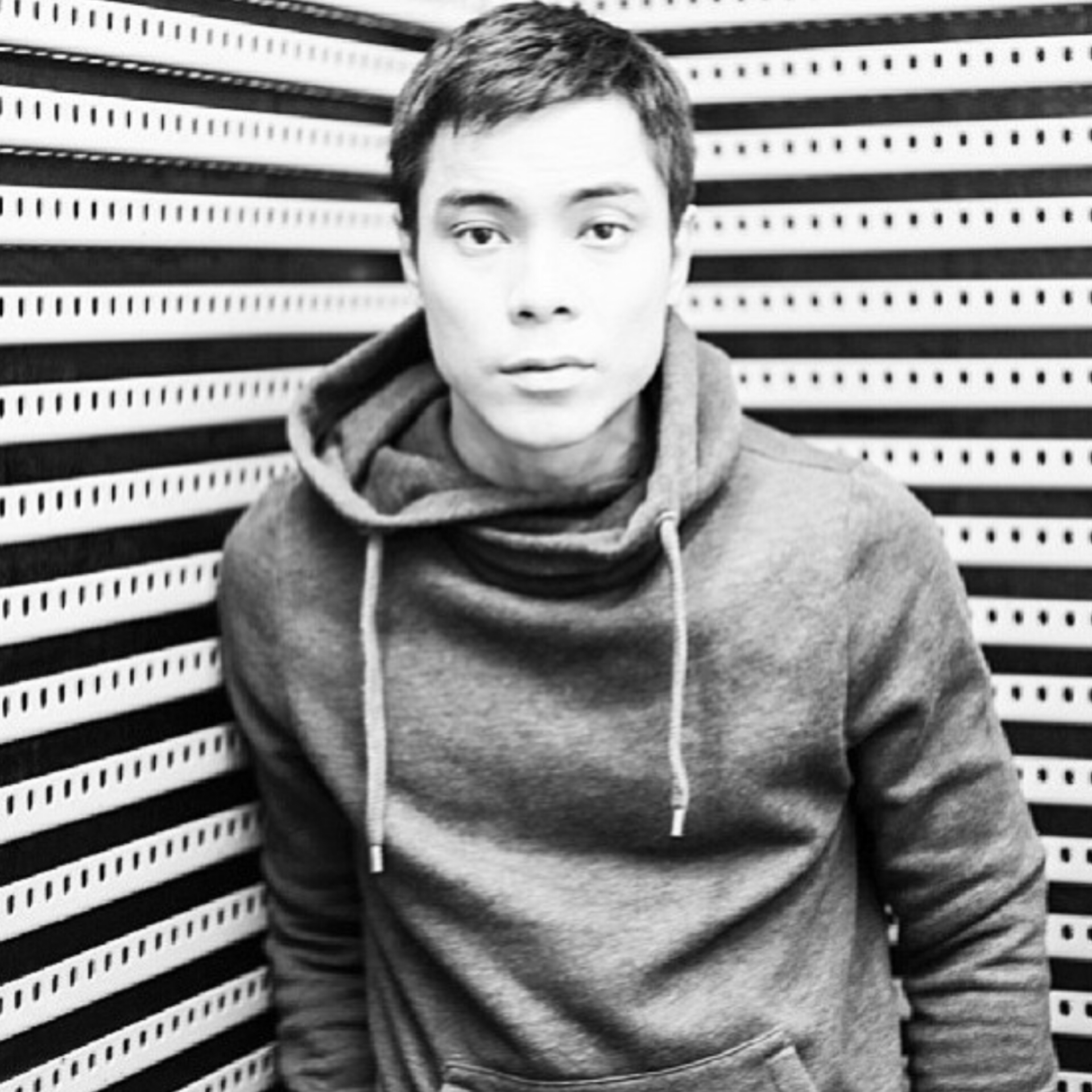
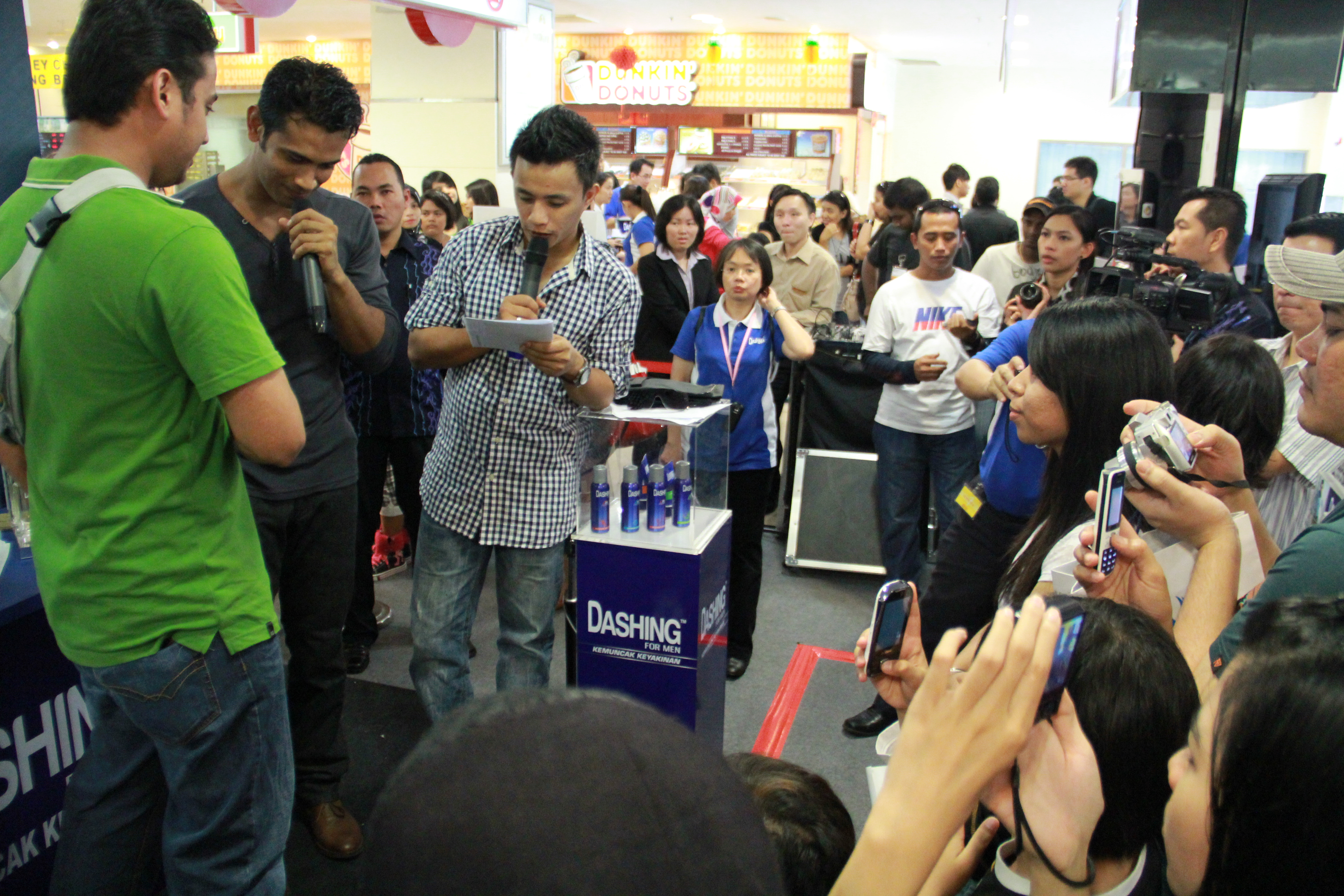
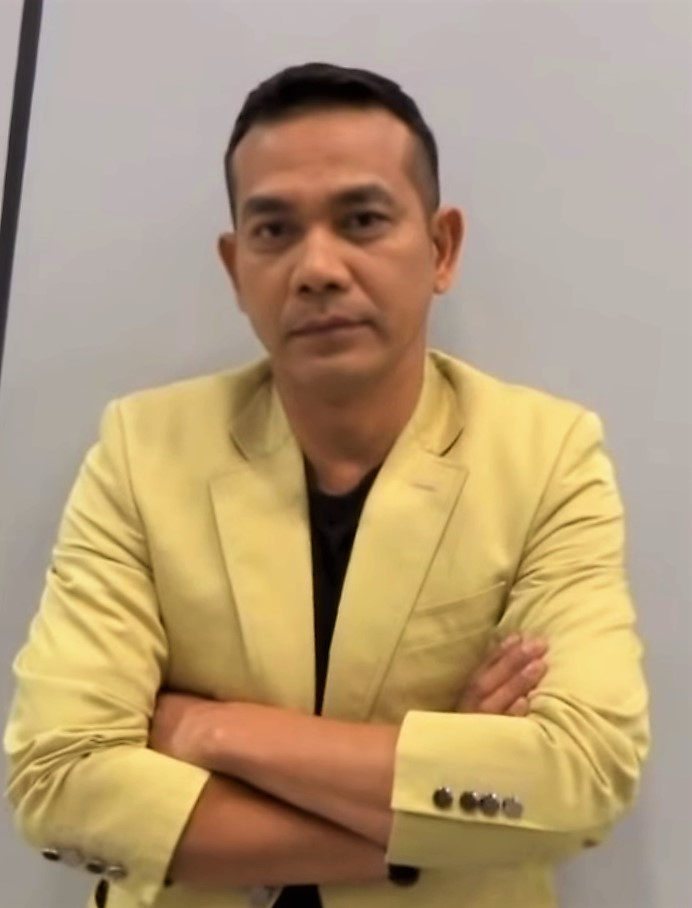
Nas-T (left), Remy Ishak (middle) and Rosyam Nor (right) were chosen to become main casts for the film.

Pre-production was started in May 2023, when Anwari revealed the front cover of the script. Later, Astro Shaw began casting the main character by 3 phases of audition, watched by Anwari himself on Astro's HQ, where the first phase received over 300 submissions via the Internet. Anwari told to media that he trusted Nas because he "don't have any other choice" due to his commitment to the character in short time. Besides Nas, Remy Ishak, Rosyam Nor and Anwaar Beg Moghal were chosen by Anwari himself. Anwari told the media that there will be other actors being cast from time to time throughout the filming session. Astro Shaw are planning to turn Keluang Man into a cinematic universe inspired by Marvel Cinematic Universe, that will not be limited to just a single film. Tiong Man, a sidekick for Keluang Man, will not be in the movie, even though there are demands from fans to include that character.

Nas reveals that he learned four new martial arts to prepare for the film. In the same article, Anwari confirmed that he's the one that requested Astro to buy property for Keluang Man to become a film. Nas reveals that almost everyone called him "Keluang Man", even the mosque preacher on Friday prayer.

=== Filming ===
Principal photography ran for 2 months starting May 2024, after Eid al-Fitr till July 2024. The stunt training was led by Saiful Reza Shukor, action director of Projek: High Council and managing director of Action Flo Films.

Shweta Sekhon who was known for Miss World Malaysia 2016 and Miss Universe Malaysia 2019 was cast as Doctor Malini, a doctor that take care of Borhan's mental health condition. Malini appears for the first time in Keluang Man in Episode 9, Season 1 directed by Kamn Ismail. Shweta told media that she had to lose weight and scheduled her eating to make sure she was in great shape for the character of Doctor Malini. Shweta also told media that her character was supposed to be "unknown" and make sure that Borhan didn't know anything. For Nas, he missed his family as he forced to sacrifice for shooting the film. He told mStar that he often video called his wife and children in updating their status at home.

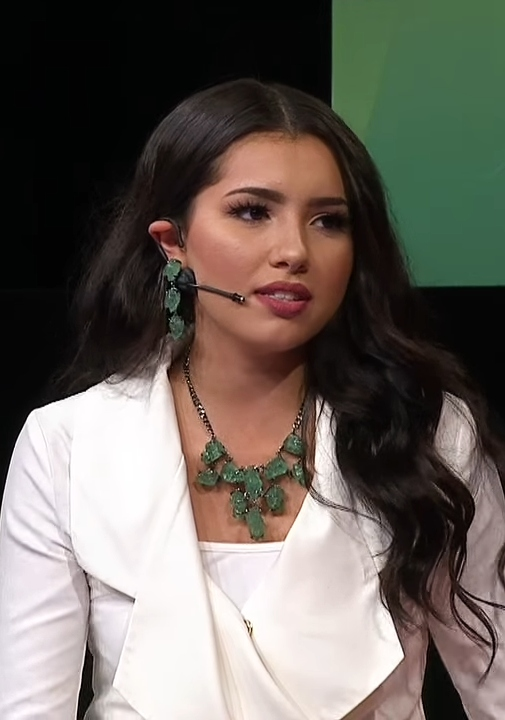
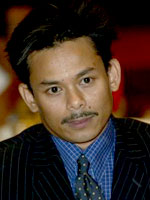
Amelia Henderson (pictured in 2016, left) and Halim Othman (pictured in 2011, right) were other cast that been revealed by Astro Shaw besides Dennis Yin, Sham Sunder and Shweta Sekhon.

Astro Shaw teased a few pictures on their social media and revealed other cast such as Dennis Yin who previously acted in Polis Evo 2, (Note: The film was co-written by Anwari himself with Joel Soh who served as director and Kyle Goonting who also served in creative director and producer.) Amelia Henderson, Halim Othman, Sham Sunder and Shweta herself.

=== Post-production ===
The film will be edited by Irwan Ahmad, who previously worked with Anwari for Project: Anchor SPM and Project: High Council with Alan Zafri from Mira Digital become one of the visual effects supervisors for the film.

== Release ==
=== Theatrical release ===
Keluang Man is scheduled to be released theatrically in Malaysia on 29 May 2025.

=== Costume design ===
The costume was designed by Roshfaizal Ariffin (Rosh), co-director of Didi & Friends The Movie and co-writer of the film. The design was leaked by fans in Wonda Coffee special edition canned drink after purchased it from the store. It was later confirmed by Rosh himself on his Instagram that it will be an official suit, thus received praise for its armor design and originality.

=== Marketing ===
Astro Shaw and Etika Holdings announced the collaboration through Wonda Coffee for Keluang Man with Calpis Soda and Mirinda for The Experts presented by Astro Shaw. The collaboration for the film will be exclusively in KidZania Kuala Lumpur.

Astro Gempak officially opened Wonda Coffee Keluang Man of the Month category to appreciate people for making good things in social media. It will be later installed into Gempak Most Wanted 2024 in 2025, the same year as the Keluang Man release.
