= Joel Soh =

Malaysian film producer and director (born 1987)

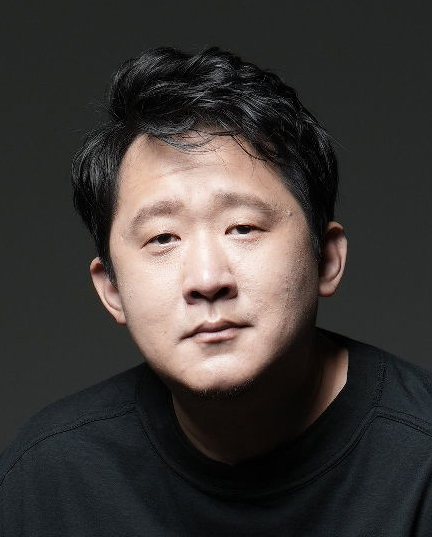
- Born: August 16, 1987 (age 39); Kuala Terengganu, Terengganu, Malaysia
- Education: Taylor's University; Emerson College
- Occupations: Film producer; Film director; Filmmaker
- Years active: 2009–present
- Employer: Blackflag Malaysia
- Notable work: Polis Evo

Joel Soh (born August 16, 1987) is a Malaysian film director, producer and writer. He is the founder and managing director of his own production company Blackflag, and most recognized for his works in the Polis Evo franchise. Recognized for his contributions to Malaysian cinema, Joel's films have a combined box office of over RM100 million, making him one of the highest-grossing film producers in Malaysia, with Polis Evo 3 collecting RM54 million.

== Early life and education ==
Joel was born in Kuala Terengganu, Terengganu, Malaysia, a coastal town where his interests in the creative arts developed at a young age.

He moved to Kuala Lumpur in 2005, at the age of 18, to pursue filmmaking at the National Cultural Arts and Heritage Academy (ASWARA). That year, he was awarded the Astro Scholarship Award and was given the opportunity to complete his Cambridge A-Levels at Taylor's University, and to pursue a Bachelor of Fine Arts (BFA) degree at Emerson College, Boston, where he graduated with summa cum laude honours and was inducted in the Gold Key Honor Society.

== Career ==
Early Career at Astro Shaw

After graduating, he returned to Malaysia and worked in Tayangan Unggul (a company under Astro) as a production executive. During his tenure, he was involved in multiple films in various capacities including the two critically acclaimed blockbusters:

· The Journey (2014)

· Ola Bola (2016)

Franchise Breakthrough

In 2015, Joel created the action-comedy film Polis Evo where he served as producer and lead-writer along with his co-workers Kyle Goonting and Anwari Ashraf, who were the recipients of the ‘Astro Scholarship Award’. The movie was a nationwide commercial success, grossing RM18 million, making it the highest-grossing Malaysian film at the time. Polis Evo also earned eight nominations at the 2016 Malaysian Film Festival, where it garnered two wins for ‘Best Supporting Actor’ and ‘Best Cinematography’ and received the ‘Special Jury Award’ for highest box office.

Polis Evo's success led Joel to co-found Blackflag in 2017, where he served as managing director. At Blackflag, Joel began work on Polis Evo 2, which he co-directed alongside Andre Chiew. Released in 2018, the sequel outperformed its predecessor, earning over RM20 million at the Malaysian box office.

Polis Evo 2 was a major milestone in Joel's career. With a production budget three times higher than the original, Polis Evo 2 was also the first Astro Shaw film to enter the Indonesian market. Joel and Andre also received nominations for ‘Best Upcoming Directors’ at the 30th Malaysia Film Festival.

In 2019, Joel produced and wrote the franchise's third installment, Polis Evo 3. The film was released in 2023, earned over RM54 million, and achieved blockbuster status as one of the highest-grossing Malaysian films of all time. During its opening weekend, it overshadowed the Hollywood blockbuster Fast X at the Malaysian box office, grossing RM1.3 million from sneak previews alone and RM2.1 million on its opening day. Polis Evo 3 is ranked no. 1 box office film in Malaysia for the year 2023 despite international competition.

Actor Sharnaaz Ahmad credited Joel for supporting his part in the film despite rumors about his alleged difficult behavior on set.

== Filmography ==
=== Film ===
Year	Title	Credited as			Notes
Year	Title	Producer	Writer	Director	Notes
2009	Room 1821	Yes	No	Yes	Short film; also as editor, and art director
2011	Angela	Yes	Yes	Yes	Short film
2014	The Journey	Associate	No	No	
2015	Cemetery of Splendour	Associate	No	No	
2015	Polis Evo	Yes	Yes	No	
2016	Ola Bola	Associate	No	No	
2018	Polis Evo 2	Yes	Yes	Yes	Co-directed with Andre Chiew
2023	Polis Evo 3	Yes	Yes	No	
2024	The Experts	Yes	Yes	No	
TBA	Baran †	Yes	Yes	Yes	

Key
†	Denotes films that have not yet been released

== Awards and nominations ==
- Special Jury Award for Highest Box Office, Film Festival Malaysia 2016 (Polis Evo)
- Best Producer, PROFIMA Award 2017 (Polis Evo)
- Best Supporting Actor, 30th Malaysia Film Festival (Polis Evo 2)
- Nominated for Best Upcoming Directors, 30th Malaysia Film Festival (Polis Evo 2)
- Best Producer, PROFIMA Award 2019 (Polis Evo 2)
- Achievement in Film Box Office, Spotlight: Apresiasi Sinema Malaysia 2023 (Polis Evo 3)

Award	Year	Category	Nominated work	Result	Ref.
Malaysia Film Festival	2016	Best Film	Polis Evo	Nominated	
Malaysia Film Festival	2016	Best Screenplay	Polis Evo	Nominated (Note: Shared with Kyle Goonting, Anwari Ashraf and Adib Zaini)	
Malaysia Film Festival	2016	Special Jury Award	Polis Evo	Won	
Malaysia Film Festival	2016	Box Office Award	Polis Evo	Won (Note: For racking RM17.74 million in mandatory 'Skim Wajib Tayang')	
Malaysia Film Festival	2018	Most Promising Director	Polis Evo 2	Nominated (Note: Shared with Andre Chiew)	
