= Nora Danish =

Malaysian actress, rapper, singer, model, television personality and businesswoman

- Nora Danish in June 2024
- Born: Nora binti Mohd Danish Hanif; 7 March 1982 (age 44); Setiu, Terengganu, Malaysia
- Occupations: Actress; Singer; Host Television; Model
- Years active: 2002—present
- Spouses: Toh Muda Dato' Rizal Ashram Ramli (m. 2006; div. 2008) Nedim Nazri Aziz (m. 2017; div. 2024)
- Children: 3
- Parents: Mohd Danish Hanif (father); Salimah Talib (mother)

Nora Mohd Danish Hanif (born 7 March 1982), professionally known as Nora Danish, is a Malaysian actress, singer, host and model.

== Background ==
Nora was born on 7 March 1982 to a parent of Arab and Burmese descent. She was educated at Convent National Secondary School in Kajang.

== Career ==
Her entertainment career started in 2004 when she first appeared in Hotlink Mysterious Girl ads.

She first gained attention in television when she starred a lead role in a comedy sitcom called Puteri. In 2013, Nora appeared in three Malay films Lagenda Budak Hostel, Mencari Cinta & 2 Kalimah.

In June 2014, Nora revealed a few sneak previews on her official Instagram account about her 2014 film Pengantin Malam co-starring Farid Kamil. She also starred with Shaheizy Sam in a blockbuster film Polis Evo.

== Personal life ==
Nora Danish was once married to businessman on 20 June 2006 but they divorced when she was 3 months pregnant in July 2008. They have a son.

On 30 March 2017, she remarried to Mohamed Nedim Datuk Seri Nazri Aziz who is the son of the UMNO BN politician, Nazri Aziz. She became the stepmother to his son from his first marriage which ended in a divorce in the year 2013. The couple has a son of their own in February 2018.

== Filmography ==
=== Film ===
Year	Title	Role	Notes
2005	Gila-Gila Pengantin Popular	Mala	Film debut
2006	Senario Dalam Pemburu Emas Yamashita	Dr. Lisa	
2010	Jangan Pandang Belakang Congkak 2	Seha	
2010	Cuti-Cuti Cinta	Eeva Elian	
2011	Seru	Yana	Special appearance
2012	Aku Terima Nikahnya	Arlisa	
2013	Lagenda Budak Hostel	Seroja	
2013	Mencari Cinta	Myra	
2013	Dua Kalimah	Selena	
2013	Bencinta	Fathia	
2014	Pengantin Malam	Maya	
2014	Anak Jantan	Nara	
2015	Gudang Kubur	Zarra	
2015	Hantu Bungkus Ikat Tepi	Mimie	
2015	Suami Aku Ustaz	Alisa	
2015	Jurassic World (Malay dubbed)	Claire Dearing	Voice only
2015	Suamiku Jatuh Dari Langit	Asyikin	
2015	Polis Evo	Anis	
2015	Chowrasta	Hanizah	
2015	Isteri Untuk Dijual	Bella	
2017	Surga Yang Tak Dirindukan 2	Sheila	Indonesia movie
2017	Warkop DKI Reborn: Jangkrik Boss! Part 2		Indonesia movie
2018	Bukan Cinta Malaikat	Dewi	Malaysian - Indonesian films
2018	Makrifat Cinta	Sofea	
2020	Kelaster	Ain	
2022	7 Minggu Sebelum Kahwin	Syifa Hana	
2022	Kan Cheong	Ayu	
2022	Seratus	Waitress	Cameo appearance
2023	Sumpahan Malam Raya	Misha	
2023	Raya Heist	Nor	
2023	Polis Evo 3	Anis	
2023	Sayu Yang Syukur	Liana	

=== Television ===
Year	Title	Role	TV channel
2013	Maharaja Lawak Mega 2013	Permanent Judge	Astro Mustika HD
2015	Sensasi BollyOne HD	Host	ABO BollyOne HD

=== Television series ===
Year	Title	Role	TV channel	Notes
2005–2008	Puteri	Puteri Fara Nordin	TV3	
2006	Gerak Khas	Fara	TV2	Episode: "Minah Rewang"
2006	Misi XX-Ray		TV3	1 episode
2007	Pendekar 5	Tun Fatimah	TV9	
2008	Gaia (Season 1)	Milla Carnella	Astro Ria	
2008	Gaia (Season 2)	Milla Carnella	Astro Ria	
2008	Gadis Cuci (Season 1)	Nasha	Astro Ria	
2009	Sumpah Bunian	Siti Hawa	TV3	
2009	Keliwon (Season 2)	Ayu	TV3	Episode: "Hantu Geweh"
2009–2010	Tiga Serumah		Astro Warna	
2010	Arjuna	Cempaka	TV3	
2010	Putera Katak	Tina	TV3	
2011	Ana Lu'lu	Ana Lu'lu	TV3	
2011	Khurafat The Series	Mastura	Astro Ria	
2011	Mistik Alam Hitam		Astro Ria & Astro Prima	Episode: "Berikan Ku Nyawa"
2011	Mistik Alam Hitam	Normah/ Vampire	Astro Ria & Astro Prima	Episode: "Beranak Dalam Kubur"
2011	Tentang Dhia	Nur Kamardhia (Dhia)	TV3	
2011	Ariana Mikhail	Ariana	TV9	
2013	Benci Vs Cinta	Alisa	Astro Ria	
2015	Ajaibnya Cinta	Halimatun	TV3	
2015–2016	Mak Cun!	Halimatun	TV3	
2016	Rumi & Jawi	Sharon	Astro Prima	
2018	Bahagia Bukan Bidaan	Ain Farhana	TV3	
2019	Imaan	Imaan	Astro Ria	
2019	Atin, Atan & Mak Cun	Halimatun	TV3	
2020	Sepenggal Puisi	Aisha	Astro Citra	
2020	Rumah Dara	Rara	Awesome TV	The comedy-drama series at Awesome TV
2020	Bougainvillea	Mimie	TV3	
2021	Covid Oh Covid	Suhaila	TV3	
2022	Puteri Reunion	Puteri Fara Nordin	TV3	
2023	Nak Dengar Cerita Hantu?		DEGUP	
2024	Perang Nasi Dagang: Kelate VS Ganu	Mek La Chendering	Astro Warna	

=== Online drama ===
Year	Title	Role	Network	Notes
2019	Ombak Rindu The Series	Dr. Khadijah	Iflix	1 episodes

=== Telemovie ===
Year	Title	Role	TV channel
2003	Cinta KLCC		VCD
2004	Celak Pak Andam	Lisa	VCD
2005	Poyo	Norma	VCD
2008	Gaia The Movie	Milla Carnella	Astro Ria
2009	Sepat Ronggeng	Zaiton	TV3
2010	Madu Sorok	Nora	TV3
2012	Jujur Aku Dayus	Lisa	TV3
2012	Maafkan Aku	Marya	TV3
2012	Anak Ikan	Maria	Astro Prima
2012	Panah Asmara	Adilla	TV1
2012	Di Bawah Langitmu	Annur	TV3
2014	Spain Uolls	Halimahtun / Tun / Heli	TV3
2016	Cikgu Timah Sekolah Bandar	Timah	Astro Citra
2016	Mak Cun Pi New York	Halimahtun	TV3
2016	Karya 12: Lampu Merah	Nora	Astro Citra
2017	Kuntom	Kuntom	Astro Citra
2018	Hingga Jumpa Lagi	Eva	Astro Citra
2020	Puyah & Putat	Puyah	Astro Citra
2021	6 Langkah Menghancurkan Ex-Boyfriend	Sha	Astro Citra
2022	Survival 486	Syuhada	Astro Citra
2024	Bakal Menantu Hajah Noraini	Kalsom	TV1

=== Music video ===
Year	Song title	Artist
2011	"Ajari Aku"	Anuar Zain
2011	"Sempurnakan Aku"	Anuar Zain

== Discography ==
Year	Title	Artist
2017	"Ini Lagi Boom"	Nora Danish ft. W.A.R.I.S

== Awards and nominations ==
Year	Award	Category	Result	Ref.
2005	Bintang Popular Berita Harian Award	Most Popular Female Newcomer	Nominated	
2007	Bintang Popular Berita Harian Award	Most Glamorous Dress	Won	
2009	Parti Hip TV Award	Hot Mama Artist	Nominated	
2010	Stail EH! Award	Most Photogenic Celebrity	Nominated	
2010	Shout! Awards	Hot Chick Award	Nominated	
2011	PPMH Award	Celebrity Gallant Award	Nominated	
2011	PPMH Award	Hot Widow Award	Won	
2011	PPMH Award	Hot Mama Award	Nominated	
2011	Skrin Award	Pantene Shine Award	Nominated	
2011	Bintang Popular Berita Harian Award	Popular Female Artist Online	Nominated	
2011	Bintang Popular Berita Harian Award	Popular Female TV Actress	Nominated	
2012	Stail EH! Award	Most Photogenic Celebrity	Nominated	
2012	Stail EH! Award	Promising Celebrity Choice	Nominated	
2012	Shout! Awards	Hot Chick Award	Won	
2017	Anugerah Instafamous 2017	#tilljannah with Nedim	Won	
2018	Indonesian Box Office Movie Awards	Kategori Pendatang Baru Terbaik	Nominated	
