= Anwari Ashraf =

Malaysian screenwriter (born 1989)

- Born: Anwari Ashraf bin Hashim; 19 August 1989 (age 37); Kulim, Kedah, Malaysia
- Education: Middlesex University
- Occupations: Screenwriter, producer, director, occasional actor
- Years active: 2010–present
- Employers: Astro Shaw; Astro
- Known for: Written Polis Evo and creating Project: High Council
- Spouse: Fatin Humaizah (m. 2011)

Anwari Ashraf Hashim (born 19 August 1989) is a Malaysian screenwriter, film producer, film director and occasional actor. He is currently become Head of Astro Shaw Ventures Production in Astro Shaw who also created Writers' Room program in 2019. He's also one of the key person behind Polis Evo franchise alongside Joel Soh and Kyle Goonting.

== Career ==
Anwari began his filmmaking career when he goes to London, United Kingdom upon received Scholarship from Astro, thus studied film video and interaction arts in Middlesex University. By the meantime, he created a short drama dark comedy film titled Kiamu! and received official selection for Portobello Film Festival in London.

After returning to Malaysia, he co-written the screenplay of 2014 film, Rentap; starring Syafie Naswip, Elfira Loy and Zahiril Adzim. He later approached by Joel Soh to co-written his first film with Astro Shaw, Polis Evo alongside Joel and Kyle Goonting.

== Personal life ==
Anwari was born in Kulim, Kedah and raised in Kuala Lumpur. He pursue his secondary schools education at Sultan Alam Shah School.

Anwari married with Fatin Humaizah in 2011 just after he graduated from his alma mater.

== Filmography ==
=== Film ===
Year	Title	Credited as			Notes
Year	Title	Writer	Producer	Director	Notes
2010	Kiamu!	Yes	Yes	Yes	Short film; also as editor and casting director
2014	Rentap	Screenplay	No	No	Also script supervisor
2014	Kami Histeria	No	Associate	No	
2014	Manisnya Cinta di Cappodia	No	Line	No	
2014	Nova	No	Yes	No	
2015	Suamiku, Encik Perfect 10!	No	Line	No	
2015	Polis Evo	Yes	No	No	
2016	Aliff Dalam 7 Dimensi	Yes	Yes	No	Also as original idea
2018	PASKAL: The Movie	Screenplay	No	No	
2018	Polis Evo 2	Yes	No	No	
2019	Pusaka	Yes	Yes	No	
2019	Wira	Screenplay	No	No	
2021	J2: J Retribusi	Yes	No	No	
2023	Polis Evo 3	Yes	No	No	
2024	Kahar: Kapla High Council	Yes	Yes	No	
2025	Keluang Man	Yes	Yes	Yes	Directional debut

=== Television movie ===
Year	Title	Credited As		Tv Channel
Year	Title	Writer	Producer	Tv Channel
2020	Mulut Masin	Yes	Supervising	Astro First
2021	Kerana Korona	No	Supervising	Astro First

=== Television series ===
Year	Title	Credited as			TV Channel	Notes
Year	Title	Creator	Writer	Director	TV Channel	Notes
2019	Sembil9n	No	No	No	Astro Citra	Script translator
2020	The Ghost Bride	Development Manager	No	No	Netflix	Malaysian-Taiwanese Netflix series
2021	Projek: Anchor SPM	Yes	Yes	Yes	Astro Citra	Directed with Razaisyam Rashid
2022	One Cent Thief	No	No	No	Astro Ria	As actor; Dani
2023	Project: High Council	Yes	Yes	Yes	Astro Ria	Directed with Zulaikha Zakaria
2024	I.D	No	No	No	Astro Premier	As actor; Prison Officer
2024	Project: Exit	No	Yes	No	Astro Premier	

== Awards and nominations ==
Award	Year	Category	Nominated work	Result	Ref.
Malaysia Film Festival	2016	Best Screenplay	Polis Evo	Nominated (Note: Shared with Joel Soh, Kyle Goonting and Adib Zaini)	
