= Good Boys Go to Heaven =

- Genre: Drama; Psychological thriller; Mystery
- Created by: Mira Mustaffa
- Written by: Mira Mustaffa; Nadim Hisham; Ariff Zulkarnain; Haris M. Nor; Nik Naemah
- Directed by: Ariff Zulkarnain
- Starring: Beto Kusyairy; Zahirah MacWilson
- Country of origin: Malaysia
- Original language: Malay
- No. of episodes: 10

Production
- Executive producer: Raja Jastina Raja Arshad
- Producers: Hazim Hisham; Nadim Hisham; Ariff Zulkarnain
- Cinematography: Tan Teck Zee
- Editors: Safwan Salleh; Faizal Basil Mohd
- Production companies: Astro Shaw; Indigo Films

Original release
- Network: Astro Citra
- Release: May 8 – June 26, 2026

Good Boys Go to Heaven is a 2026 Malaysian television drama series broadcast on Astro Citra from 8 May to 26 June 2026. Directed by Ariff Zulkarnain, the series stars Beto Kusyairy and Zahirah MacWilson in the lead role.

== Premise ==
Yasser faced a moment of anxiety when his eight-year-old son, Ahyan, suddenly disappeared. Police and volunteers launched a massive search operation in the surrounding area to track down the little boy. He become the prime suspect of his son's murder. The case against him escalates when it turns out that he has no alibi, suffers from memory problems and domestic turmoil. Increasingly depressed, Yasser begins his own investigation to unravel the mystery of Ahyan's death.

== Cast ==
=== Main ===
- Beto Kusyairy as Yasser Nu'man
- Zahirah MacWilson as Dahlia Iskandar

=== Supporting ===
- Sayf Mikael as Ahyan Yasser
- Firdaus Karim as Bahamin Basheer
- Sky Iskandar as Reyhan Abdullah Sani
- Malek Mccrone as Zayd Jamaludin
- Amerul Affendi as Inspector Kamal Hussaini
- Mila Mohsin as Maureen
- Amanda Ang as Sergeant Leona Lee
- Dai Fuad as Anwar Nahar Musa Alamin
- Zaleha Iman as Mia

=== Guests ===
- Sherie Merlis as Anisah
- Rafique Iskandar as young Yasser
- Afif Aisy as young Bahamin muda
- Faiz Shafie as young Zayd
- Essan Yahya as the news presenter
- Haris M. Nor as Ustaz
- Stivens Hwang Shuang Aun as Uncle Yap
- Shah Kimin as Ustaz Nizam
- Marzuki Noh as Nu'man Nurdin
- Qaid Aqwa as young Nahar

== Production ==
Good Boys Go to Heaven was directed by Ariff Zulkarnain, with Mira Mustaffa, Nadim Hisham, Ariff Zulkarnain, Haris M. Nor and Nik Naemah serves as the screenwriters. The production team also worked with experts in child psychology and medical fields to ensure the issues of trauma and child disappearance was handled responsibly, while given its highly sensitive nature.

Filming took place in most parts of Kuala Lumpur and the Klang Valley area, as well as Perak for 52 days.

== Themes ==
Ian Jeremiah Patrick, writing for the Malay Mail, highlights the series depiction of "trauma in depth" and examines "such experiences affect not only individuals, but also those around them".
