= Kyle Goonting =

Malaysian film screenwriter and producer (born 1988)

- Born: Kyle Ezra Goonting; May 18, 1988 (age 38); Banting, Selangor, Malaysia
- Other name: Be Wilder Beans
- Education: University of New South Wales
- Occupations: Screenwriter; Producer
- Years active: 2015–present
- Employer: Astro Shaw
- Notable work: Polis Evo

Kyle Ezra Goonting (born 18 May 1988), also known by the nickname Be Wilder Beans, is a Malaysian film screenwriter, creative development, supervising and creative producer. He is currently the head of production & development in Astro Shaw, the company he worked for since Polis Evo production. He is also one of the key people for the Polis Evo franchise alongside Joel Soh and Anwari Ashraf. He was also the co-creator and a founding member of Blackflag, a Malaysian film company managed by Soh.

== Career ==
Goonting began his career in 2009 with the Astro Scholarship to University of New South Wales, or UNSW. In Australia, Kyle received a bachelor's in arts for film, cinema and video studies. In an interview with Astro Awani, Goonting told to Mariah Ahmad that he opened his eyes when he stays in Sydney for three years by learning more about Hollywood filmmaking.

After returned to Malaysia in 2012, he was appointed by Joel Soh to co-written Polis Evo with Soh himself and Anwari Ashraf. Goonting told Astro Awani about commitment by staffs in Polis Evo;

"I think the combination of all of them helped a lot to produce something extraordinary in this film. All parties try to give their best and if they do not succeed in reaching the desired level, they will be honest and try to improve it as best as possible. That's why if there is a scene that is not satisfactory, both the director, and the production crew and cast, they will try to redo it until it looks better."

In 2016, he co-created Malaysian production film company, Blackflag with Joel Soh and David Lin where he previously served as creative director until 2020. In 2024, he created his first ever series together with his wife titled Framed, starring Mimi Lana, Meerqeen, Ram Raaga and Sangeeta Krishnasamy.

== Personal life ==
On a podcast by The Rumah Roy hosted by Roshan Gomez (his cousin), Kyle met his wife throughout board games.

== Filmography ==
=== Film ===
Year	Title	Credited as		Notes
Year	Title	Writer	Producer	Notes
2014	Nova	Creative development	No	Produced by Priya Narayanan and Anwari Ashraf
2015	Polis Evo	Yes	No	
2016	Ola Bola	Creative development	No	
2016	Aliff Dalam 7 Dimensi	Creative development	No	
2018	Polis Evo 2	Yes	Creative	Also as creative producer
2022	Abang Long Fadil 3	Head of development	No	Uncredited
2022	Juang	Head of development	No	Uncredited
2022	The Devil's Deception	Head of development	No	Uncredited
2022	Mechamato Movie	Head of development	No	Uncredited
2023	Didi & Friends The Movie	Head of development	No	
2023	Polis Evo 3	Yes	No	
2023	MALBATT: Misi Bakara	Head of development	No	Screenplay by Adrian Teh and Ashraf Modee Zain
2023	Gemencheh Boys	Head of development	No	
2024	The Experts	Yes	No	
2024	Gold	Head of development	Supervising	Supervising producer with Siti Marzulina Marzuki
2024	Baik Punya Ah Long	No	Supervising	
2024	Kahar: Kapla High Council	No	Supervising	
2025	Keluang Man	No	Supervising	
2025	Abah Saya, Uncle Mike	Story	No	

=== Series ===
Year	Title	Credited as			Notes
Year	Title	Creator	Writer	Producer	Notes
2021	Black (Season 2)	No	Creative Executive	No	Based on adaptation by South Korea TV series, Black
2022	Kuasa	No	No	Supervising	
2022	One Cent Thief	Head of development	No	No	Created and developed for television by Alfie Palermo, based on true story
2023	Project: High Council	Head of development	No	No	
2023	Liar	No	No	Supervising	Based on adaptation by British TV series, Liar
2023	Riot!	No	No	Supervising	Supervising producer with Alfie Palermo and Siti Marzulina Marzuki
2024	I.D	No	No	Supervising	Supervising producer with Alfie Palermo and Siti Marzulina Marzuki
2024	Framed	Yes	Yes	Showrunner	Also as second unit director and main writer with Nadim Hisham
2024	X-Change	No	No	Supervising	

== Awards and nomination ==
Award	Year	Category	Nominated work	Results	Ref.
Malaysia Film Festival	2016	Best Screenplay	Polis Evo	Nominated (Note: Shared with Joel Soh, Anwari Ashraf and Adib Zaini)	
Asian Academy Creative Awards	2023	Best Drama Series	One Cent Thief	Nominated (Note: He received on behalf of Astro Shaw as head of production & development)	
Asian Academy Creative Awards	2023	Best Feature Film	Polis Evo 3	Nominated (Note: National winner from Malaysia)	
