= Polis Evo 3 =

2023 Malaysian film

- Official theatrical poster
- Directed by: Syafiq Yusof
- Written by: Joel Soh; Kyle Goonting; Anwari Ashraf; Abhilash Chandra; Bernice Low
- Story by: Joel Soh
- Produced by: Joel Soh
- Starring: Shaheizy Sam; Zizan Razak; Sharnaaz Ahmad; Nora Danish; Syafiq Kyle; Douglas Lim; Farali Khan
- Cinematography: Jordan Chiam
- Edited by: Nazim Shah; Lee Pai Seang
- Music by: Ken Hor; Lo Shi Seng
- Production companies: Astro Shaw; Skop Productions; Blackflag; TGV Cinemas
- Distributed by: Astro Shaw; TGV Pictures
- Release dates: 25 May 2023 (Malaysia, Singapore & Brunei)
- Running time: 113 minutes
- Country: Malaysia
- Language: Malay
- Budget: MYR 6 million
- Box office: MYR 54 million

Polis Evo 3 (English: Police Evo 3) is a 2023 Malaysian Malay-language buddy cop action comedy film directed by Syafiq Yusof from the story by Joel Soh (also as co-writer) starring Zizan Razak and Shaheizy Sam who reprise their respective roles, with Sharnaaz Ahmad joining them as the main antagonist. A sequel to Polis Evo (2015) and Polis Evo 2 (2018), the film is the third installment in the Polis Evo film series. Originally slated for a 2021 release, the film was postponed to 2022 before officially being released on 25 May 2023.

== Plot ==
The film starts with Inspector Khai and Inspector Sani being interrogated inside a gang hideout. Inspector Sani is forced by the gang leader to shoot Inspector Khai, but as Khai is wearing a protective vest, he kills the person dragging his "body" away, which leads to a fight between everyone in the room. After knocking the leader unconscious, Khai and Sani carry his body outside, only to be discovered as police officers. This leads to another shootout, with Khai, Sani and the gang leader escaping via jumping out a window. During the aftermath of the fight, Khai notices Reza in a hoodie looking at them.

The film transitions to Sani's family estate in Terengganu. There, it is revealed that Khai is dating Anis.

At Penang Island, Reza is seen holding a cop hostage. Reza gives the cop a choice: to set off a bomb hidden inside a nearby restaurant, or to set off another bomb hidden inside another nearby restaurant in which the cop's wife and daughter is in. He ends up setting off both bombs while fighting Reza, and is killed.

Inspector Khai and Inspector Sani, along with the rest of the UKAP team, is called for a meeting involving the bombings. It is revealed that Reza was last seen attempting suicide by burning down his house whilst in it, and also that Semtex, possibly smuggled in by arms dealer Gaya, was used for the bombings. The UKAP team is assigned with tracking down Gaya's location and obtaining burner phones used to call Reza, along with tracking his location.

During the operation, Khai successfully obtains the phones. However, they are found, leading to a shootout.

While walking in the night market with Anis and Sani, Khai spots and tries to capture Reza. He attempts to kill Reza but fails to and spares him.

While Sani talks to Khai, Khai reveals that Reza was his ex-partner in the police force. Reza's wife, Farah was killed during an operation to take down Ops Sabrum, since Khai failed to detonate a bomb inside a building they were operating in. This leads to the start of Reza's hatred towards him.

Khai steals the stolen phones' logs, which Inspector Dell had written down. He then calls Reza to meet him in a stadium. Reza is captured by the UKAP during the meetup. Reza was later presumedly transported to be held in Kamuting Prison.

The UKAP team was later assigned another operation to take down another one of Reza's bombs inside a condominium. No bomb was found, but some images of Reza's targets were.

While transporting Reza to Kamuting, Reza starts a shootout between himself and the cars transporting and guarding him. Reza successfully escaped, and proceeded to kidnap and hold Anis hostage. Reza later instructs Khai to go to Bukit Bintang.

At Bukit Bintang, Khai finds Anis with a walkie-talkie which Reza starts speaking out of. Reza gives Khai a choice: to set off a timed bomb hidden inside Anis' shirt, or to set off a bomb hidden inside Bukit Bintang MRT station. Khai uses Morse code to tell the rest of the UKAP team (who were scanning all CCTV cameras near Bukit Bintang) that if they find the other bomb, they should cut both bombs during the last 10 seconds of the timer. Inspector Dani finds the other bomb, but is instructed by Dell to cut the bomb during the last 10 seconds. Anis, unknowing of the twin cut, tries to set off the bomb on her, but Sani forces her not to. Khai later shoots Sani to stop him struggling with Anis. Khai tells Anis to cut the bomb in the last 10 seconds of the timer.

The twin cut proved successful, as both bombs did not go off. A furious Reza reveals himself to Khai and starts a shooting in Bukit Bintang. Inspector Julie, who was standing by near Khai, went up to the building where Reza was, but fails to neutralize him. Later, Khai and Sani go up themselves and finally kill Reza after a furious fight.

The final scenes of the movie show Khai next to Reza's grave, Sani and Khadijah getting married, and Khai proposing to Anis, which she accepts.

Zizan Razak (left) and Shaheizy Sam (right) who reprised their buddy cop roles as Inspector Sani and Inspector Khai

== Cast ==
- Shaheizy Sam as Khairul / Inspector Khai
- Zizan Razak as Hassani / Inspector Sani
- Sharnaaz Ahmad as Reza Rashid, a former police sergeant who has a deadly grudge against Inspector Khai
- Nora Danish as Anis, Sani's younger sister and Inspector Khai's girlfriend
- Syafiq Kyle as Inspector Dani, a member of the UKAP team and a bomb disposal expert
- Douglas Lim as Inspector Dell, UKAP team member and IT specialist
- Farali Khan as Inspector Julie, the only female member of UKAP; accurate shooting specialist
- Fauzi Nawawi as ACP Farouk, head of UKAP
- Eyka Farhana as Yati, Sani's youngest sister
- Kamaliah Mat Dom as Sani's mother
- Fadilah Mansor as Khai's mother

=== Special appearance ===
- Fezrul Khan as Inspector Faizal, former colleague of Insp Khai and Sgt Reza
- Michael Ang as Chao, the leader of the gang and the fugitives of Khai and Sani who appear at the beginning of the film
- Ben Amir as Gaya's right-hand man
- Iman Corinne Adrienne as Gaya, arms dealer and supplier of Semtex to Reza
- Wanna Ali as Khadijah, fiancée of Insp Sani
- Zulin Aziz as Mimi, Insp Sani's neighbour
- Fouziah Gous as Insp Faizal's Wife
- Ezzaty Abdullah as Farah, Reza's wife who was killed during Ops Sabrum
- Danial Zaini as Security Guard
- Radin Era as Witness
- Irfan Zaini as Irfan Zain
- Dato' Afdlin Shauki as Kassim, Khadijah's father and Insp Sani's father-in-law

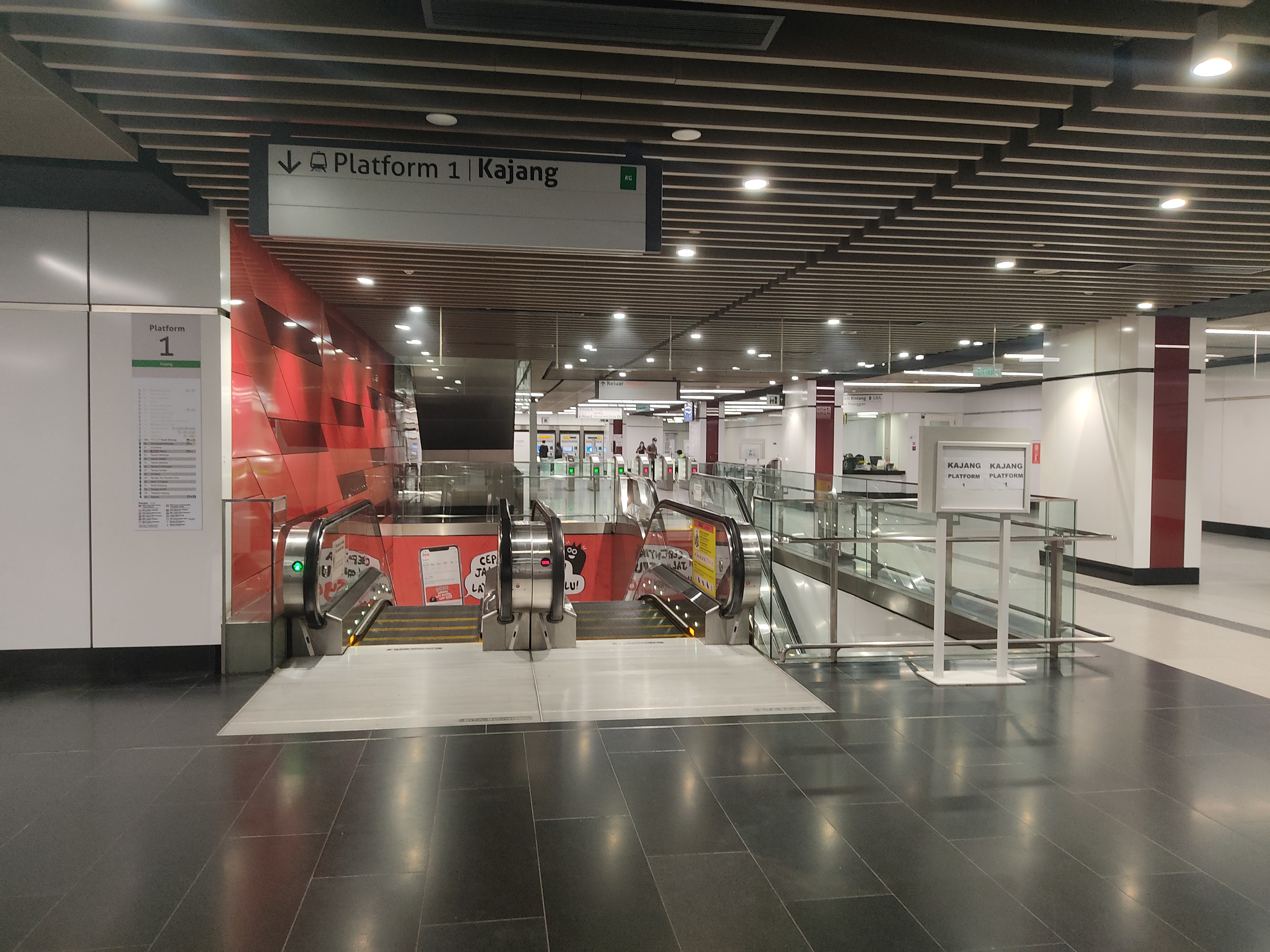
Bukit Bintang MRT station used for putting 20kg of Semtex bomb

== Production ==
After the success of the previous two films, the third film series was announced in September 2019 with Syafiq Yusof taking over as director from Ghaz Abu Bakar who directed the Polis Evo, and Joel Soh and Andre Chiew who directed Polis Evo 2, at the same time returned original genre of this film which is action comedy.

Zizan Razak and Shaheizy Sam have agreed to reprise their roles, also returning to act in the third series of this film are Nora Danish and Eyka Farhana. Syafiq Kyle who is famous for TV dramas including Mencintaimu Mr. Photographer and Nur, playing the role of Inspector Dani. Also making this film successful are Michael Ang, Fauzi Nawawi, Ben Amir and Sharnaaz Ahmad.

The production of this film had been temporarily postponed due to the COVID-19 pandemic, which has resulted in the temporary suspension of all film and drama filming activities.

Filming was done around Kuala Lumpur and Selangor and the Bukit Bintang MRT station was also used as a bomb scene.

== Soundtrack ==
The official soundtrack for the movie Polis EVO 3 is "Ayuh" performed by Malique, Kmy Kmo, Ernie Zakri and Aman RA. It was released on April 13, 2023, which is the same day the movie trailer was released for the music video lyrics, and the official music video on May 19, 2023, six days before the full release on May 25.

== Output ==
=== Screening ===
Following the spread of the COVID-19 pandemic in Malaysia which resulted in the closure of cinemas and the implementation of the Movement Control Order (MCO) carried out throughout the country, Datuk Yusof Haslam (executive producer of the film) announced that this film together with Abang Long Fadil 3 (also directed by Syafiq) has postponed its planned launch in early 2022. Unfortunately, this film was scheduled to release in Malaysia, Singapore and Brunei from 25 May 2023 after Eid al-Fitr, a week after Fast X and a week before Spider-Man: Across The Spider-Verse.

=== Marketing ===
On the launch of this film, Polis Evo 3 collaborated with PUBG Mobile by applying a special limited content pack themed to the film. A special edition action figure of this film was also released in collaboration with Astro Shaw, Rojak Daily and English Speaking Asians (ESA). This film mural by Abdul Rashade has been immortalized in Jalan Kamunting, Kuala Lumpur thanks to the support of Kuala Lumpur City Hall (DBKL). The mural launched by Raja Jastina Raja Arshad (head of Astro Shaw & Nusantara), Euan Daryl Smith (CEO of Astro), Zizan Razak and Shaheizy Sam.

== Reception ==
=== Box office ===
Days of screening	Cumulative sales
Early screening (24 May)	RM 1.3 million (US$272,679)
1 day (25 May)	RM 3.4 million (US$713,162)
4 days (28 May)	RM16 million (US$3,356,057)
7 days (31 May)	RM25 million (US$5,243,840)
9 days (2 June)	RM30 million (US$6,292,608)
12 days (6 June)	RM41 million (US$8,662,823)
16 days (10 June)	RM45 million (US$9,438,912)
24 days (18 June)	RM50 million (US$10,487,680)
32 days (26 June)	RM52 million (US$10,907,187)
56 days (20 July)	RM54 million (US$11,326,694)

Polis Evo 3 reached RM3.4 million on the opening day of the release across Malaysia, Singapore and Brunei to beat out Fast X that release around. After 4 days, this film beat Syamsul Yusof's directed film, Mat Kilau: Kebangkitan Pahlawan (RM12.2 million after 4 days) for a box office record of RM16 million post-COVID 19 pandemic and behind another Syamsul's film, Munafik 2 (RM21 million after 4 days) for an overall record. After a week of screening, this film beat out its predecessor, Polis Evo 2, equals Abang Long Fadil 3 directed by Syafiq Yusof which was co-produced by Skop Productions and Astro Shaw and also beat out another box office record from Mat Kilau. This film managed to equal Astro Shaw's distributed animated film, BoBoiBoy Movie 2 by collecting RM30 million in just 9 days. After 2 weeks of screening, this film became Astro Shaw's number 1 box office film by collecting RM41 million; thus beating out Hantu Kak Limah and Mechamato Movie. On Father's Day, this film became the second film to reach the RM50 million mark after 24 days. The film kept rising until it reached RM54 million across 3 countries and RM50.11 million in Malaysia.

Astro collected an income of RM870 million for the second quarter for the financial year ends 31 January 2024. Some of that income was generated from this film and MALBATT: Misi Bakara (RM32.5 million as 18 September 2023) which both films were produced by Astro Shaw.
