= Shaheizy Sam =

Malaysian actor (born 1982)

- شاهيزي سام
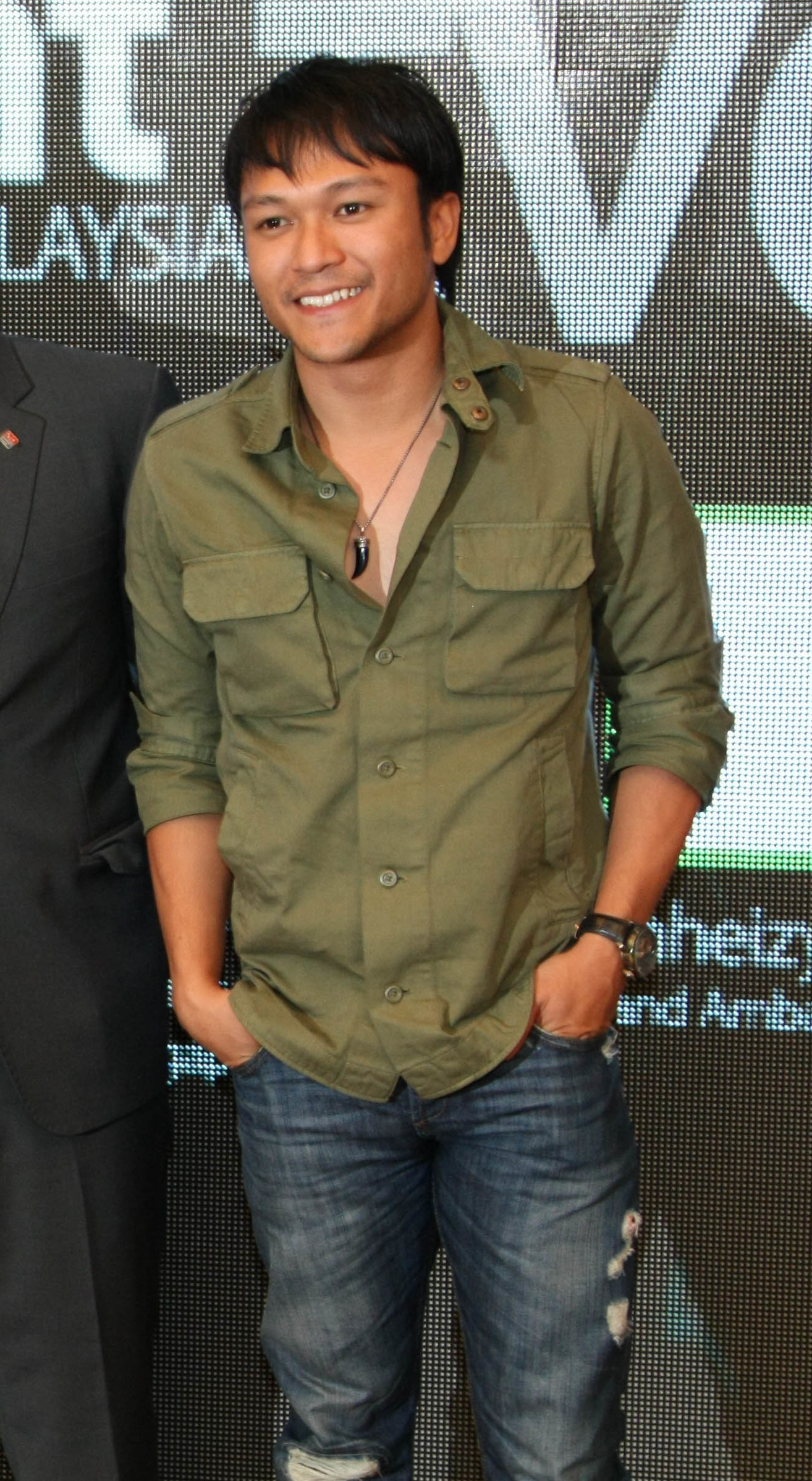
- Sam in 2013
- Born: Shaheizy Sam bin Abdul Samad; 4 September 1982 (age 44); Petaling Jaya, Selangor, Malaysia
- Occupations: Actor; singer; producer
- Years active: 1995–present
- Spouse: Syatilla Melvin (m. 2016)
- Children: 3
- Relatives: Zizie Ezette (sister); Bung Moktar Radin (brother-in-law)

Shaheizy Sam bin Abdul Samad (born 4 September 1982) is a Malaysian actor who was known as a young star in the 1990s before rising to fame in the film Bohsia: Jangan Pilih Jalan Hitam in 2009, and Adnan Sempit in the following year.

== Biography ==
=== Family ===
Three of his siblings are also involved in the entertainment industry. His first brother, Ahmad Shah Al-Jeffry (also known as Jeff), was a member of a 1990s pop group, A to Z. His sister, Zizie Ezette, is an actress with numerous film and TV dramas to her credit.

== Personal life ==
Shaheizy Sam married Malaysian actress Syatilla Melvin on 8 February 2016. The couple has a son born in 2017 and two daughters born in 2019 and 2022.

== Filmography ==
Key
Denotes films that have not yet been released

=== Film ===
Year	Title	Role	Notes
1995	Sama Tak Serupa	Mamat	Debut film appearances
2009	Bohsia: Jangan Pilih Jalan Hitam	Acai	
2009	Syurga Cinta	Alex	
2009	Jangan Pandang Belakang Congkak	Johan	
2010	Adnan Sempit	Adnan	
2010	Niyang Rapik	Zizan	
2010	Evolusi KL Drift 2	Erry	
2010	Ngangkung	Azim	
2011	Kongsi	Tumulak	
2011	Sekali Lagi	Arman	
2011	Bini-Biniku Gangster	Henry	
2011	Aku Bukan Tomboy	Harry	
2011	Songlap	Adam / Am	
2012	Adnan Sempit 2	Adnan	
2012	Nongkrong	Bada	
2012	Aku Ada, Kau Ada???	Nordin Ahmad	
2012	8 Jam	Alang Budiman	
2012	SAM: Saya Amat Mencintaimu	Sam	
2013	Dua Kalimah	Aiman	
2013	Adnan Sempit 3	Adnan	
2013	Kisah Paling Gangster	Remy	
2014	Adnan Sempit Sawadikap	Adnan	
2014	Mamak Cupcake	MJ	
2014	Kaki Kitai	Grenggo / Din	
2014	Manisnya Cinta Di Cappadoccia	Nazmi	
2014	Kasut Ku Kusut	Manap	
2015	Rembat	Malik	
2015	Polis Evo	Khairul / Inspector Khai	
2016	Mat Moto	Acai	
2016	Interchange	Detective Man	
2017	Pinjamkan Hatiku	Naufal	
2018	Polis Evo 2	Khairul / Inspector Khai	
2021	Edge of the World	Subu	
2021	Zombitopia	Zidik	
2023	Tiger Stripes	Dr. Rahim	
2023	Polis Evo 3	Khairul / Inspector Khai	Also as co-executive
2023	MALBATT: Misi Bakara	Ramlee	
2023	La Luna	Salihin Arshad	
2024	SyurgaKu	Amir	Short film
2024	Abnormal: Buas	Taufiq	Special appearance
2025	Badak	Badak	
2025	Indera	Joe	
2026	Chelot	Dato' Bakri	
TBA	The Original Gangster	Jim	Post-production
TBA	Cobra 7: Peluru Terakhir	Damian	Post-production
TBA	Dawn Raid	Khalid Ibrahim	Cancelled project

=== Telemovie ===
Year	Title	Role	TV channel
1998	Pa'e	Pa'e	TV3
1998	Seiras Maya	Atan	TV3
2003	The Son	Iqbal	NTV7
2004	Kelab Wayang Gambar	Tengku Nasarudin	Astro Ria
2007	Liang Lahad	Arif	Astro Ria
2008	Noda Semalam	Hassan	TV3
2008	Cahaya Lailatulqadar	Ustaz Faris	Astro Prima
2008	Alahai Cucu Atuk	Ujang	Astro Ria
2009	Intan Sayang Manja	Hambali	TV3
2009	Ayam Goreng Comel	Daniel	TV3
2010	Takdir	Azman	TV3
2010	Alahai Cicit Atuk	Ujang	Astro Ria
2011	Kubur Tak Bertanda	Zein	Astro Citra
2012	Takdir		TV3
2012	Nyanyian Sakaratul Maut	Talib	TV3
2013	Adnan Semp-It Balik Raya	Adnan	TV3
2014	Spain Uolls	Akif	TV3
2015	Cermin Kasih	Amran	TV3
2017	Baby Bro	Joe	Astro First Exclusive
2023	Heist-Dil Adha	Sam	Astro Ria

=== Television series ===
Year	Title	Role	TV channel	Notes
2007	Elly	Himself	NTV7	
2007	Bisikan Hati	Fizi	TV2	
2008	Impak Maksima the Series	Amran	TV3	
2008	KL Menjerit The Series	Jeff	Astro Ria	
2008	Ali Din	Tengku Iskandar	TV3	
2008	Graduan	AJ	Astro Ria	
2009	Gerak Khas (Season 11)	Joe	TV2	Episode: "Kaki Buli"
2009	Kasanova XXL	Ozi	TV3	
2009	Legasi 43 Karat	Johan	TV3	
2009	Keliwon (Season 2)	Amran	TV3	Episode: "Hantu Kubur"
2009	Keliwon (Season 2)	Malik	TV3	Episode: "Keranda Terbang"
2010	Jangan Pandang Belakang The Series (Season 2)	Khairul	TV2	
2010	Asmaradana	Amran	TV3	
2010	Adnan Semp-It The Series	Adnan	Astro Warna	
2013	Kisah Cinta	Shah	TV3	
2015	Ajaibnya Cinta	Akif	TV3	
2015	Oh My English!: Class of 2015	Himself	Astro TVIQ	Episode: "The Sam Scam"
2016	Aku Bukan Bimbo	Dani Ikram	Astro Ria	
2022	Take CTRL	Papa	TA-DAA!	
2024	Takdir Itu Milik Aku	Zarif Adha	Astro Ria	

=== Television show ===
Year	Program	Role	TV channel
2016–2017	Maharaja Lawak Mega 2016	Jury	Astro Warna

=== Web series ===
Year	Title	Role	Network	Notes
2015	Pelangi Cinta	Sam	CLEAR Malaysia YouTube	Special series for CLEAR shampoo

== Endorsements ==
Year	Product	Notes	Ref.
2012	Mamee Noodles		
2013	WeChat	with Lisa Surihani	
2013	Nescafè		
2014	Mahsuri Soy Sauce		
2015	CLEAR Shampoo	with Juliana Evans	
2015	ARTISARI	with Khaty Fauziah & Fezrul Khan	
2015	Alba		

== Discography ==
- Oh! Saya Sayangkan Mamee
- Begini Caranya Feat Yana Samsudin
- Bangun Feat Liyana Jasmay
- Go ! Go ! Go ! Feat Aniu (ost Rembat)

== Activism ==
On 21 May 2015, Sam was appointed alongside comedian Nabil Ahmad as the 1JPJ Youth Squad Icons by the Road Transport Department of Malaysia (JPJ). The purpose of 1JPJ Youth Squad is to provide public awareness of road safety and foster a spirit of volunteerism, unity and patriotism.

== Awards and nominations ==
Year	Award	Category	Nominated work	Result
2009	22nd Malaysian Film Festival	Best Supporting Actor	Bohsia: Jangan Pilih Jalan Hitam	Nominated
2010	2nd Shout! Awards	Hot Guy Award	—N/a	Nominated
2010	23rd Malaysian Film Festival	Best Supporting Actor	Evolusi KL Drift 2	Won
2010	14th Skrin Awards	Best Supporting Actor (Film)	Evolusi KL Drift 2	Nominated
2010	14th Skrin Awards	Yasmin Ahmad Award	—N/a	Won
2010	Cosmopolitan Fun Fearless Fabulous Awards	Hot Guy	—N/a	Won
2011	24th Bintang Popular Berita Harian Awards	Most Popular Artist	—N/a	Won
2011	24th Bintang Popular Berita Harian Awards	Most Popular Film Actor	—N/a	Won
2011	24th Bintang Popular Berita Harian Awards	Most Popular TV Actor	—N/a	Nominated
2011	15th Skrin Awards	Best Actor (Film)	Kongsi	Nominated
2011	24th Malaysian Film Festival	Best Actor	Kongsi	Won
2012	Media Hiburan Readers Choice Awards	Favourite Celebrity Award	—N/a	Won
2012	25th Bintang Popular Berita Harian Awards	Sri Perak Award	—N/a	Nominated
2012	25th Bintang Popular Berita Harian Awards	Most Popular Film Actor	—N/a	Nominated
2012	25th Bintang Popular Berita Harian Awards	Stylish Male Artist	—N/a	Nominated
2012	3rd Stail EH! Awards	Best Celebrity Achievement	—N/a	Nominated
2012	1st Blockbuster Awards	Best Male Performance	Bini-biniku Gangster	Nominated
2012	1st Blockbuster Awards	Best Male Performance	Sekali Lagi	Nominated
2012	3rd Shout! Awards	Hot Guy Award	—N/a	Nominated
2012	16th Anugerah Skrin	Best Actor (Film)	Songlap	Won
2012	25th Malaysian Film Festival	Best Actor	Songlap	Nominated
2012	25th Malaysian Film Festival	Best Actor	SAM: Saya Amat Mencintaimu	Nominated
2013	26th Bintang Popular Berita Harian Awards	Most Popular Artist	—N/a	Won
2013	26th Bintang Popular Berita Harian Awards	Most Popular Film Actor	—N/a	Won
2013	26th Bintang Popular Berita Harian Awards	Best on Screen Chemistry (with Yana Samsuddin)	—N/a	Nominated
2013	26th Bintang Popular Berita Harian Awards	Stailo Male Artist	—N/a	Nominated
2013	1st Warna Comedy Awards	Best Comedy Actor – Film	Adnan Sempit 2	Nominated
2013	2nd Blockbuster Awards	Best Male Performance	Adnan Sempit 2	Nominated
2013	2nd Blockbuster Awards	Best Theme Song (with Yana Samsuddin)	"Beginilah Caranya"	Won
2013	17th Skrin Awards	Best Actor (Film)	SAM: Saya Amat Mencintaimu	Won
2013	1st Melodi Awards	Dynamic Artist Award	—N/a	Nominated
2013	1st Melodi Awards	Male Choice Artist Award	—N/a	Nominated
2013	1st ASEAN International Film Festival	Best Actor	Songlap	Won
2013	National Film Development Corporation Malaysia (FINAS)	Anugerah Pencapaian Karyawan Filem Peringkat Antarabangsa	—N/a	Won
2014	27th Bintang Popular Berita Harian Awards	Most Popular Film Actor	—N/a	Nominated
2014	27th Bintang Popular Berita Harian Awards	Stailo Male Artists	—N/a	Nominated
2014	2nd Warna Comedy Awards	Best Comedy Actor – Film	Adnan Sempit 3	Nominated
2015	2nd MeleTOP ERA Awards	Film Stars Award	Adnan Sempit Sawadikap	Nominated
2015	28th Bintang Popular Berita Harian Awards	Most Popular Artist	—N/a	Won
2015	28th Bintang Popular Berita Harian Awards	Most Popular Film Actor	—N/a	Won
2015	3rd Warna Comedy Awards	Best Comedy Actor – Film	Adnan Sempit Sawadikap	Nominated
2015	3rd Warna Comedy Awards	Best Comedy Actor – Film	Kaki Kitai	Nominated
2015	3rd Warna Comedy Awards	Most Popular Comedian – Male	—N/a	Nominated
2016	3rd MeleTOP ERA Awards	Film Stars Award	Polis EVO	Nominated
2016	3rd MeleTOP ERA Awards	Best Fashion Award	—N/a	Nominated
2016	3rd MeleTOP ERA Awards	Popular Online Star Award	—N/a	Nominated
2016	1st Online Choice Awards	Online Choice – Best Actor	—N/a	Nominated
2016	1st Online Choice Awards	Dnars Choice – Handsome Guy	—N/a	Nominated
2016	29th Bintang Popular Berita Harian Awards	Most Popular Film Actor	—N/a	Nominated
2016	28th Malaysian Film Festival	Best Actor	Polis EVO	Nominated
2016	20th Skrin Awards	Best Actor (Film)	Polis EVO	Nominated
2016	5th Stail EH! Awards	Best Body – Male Celebrities	—N/a	Nominated
2016	5th Stail EH! Awards	Best Celebrity Achievement	—N/a	Nominated
2016	5th Stail EH! Awards	Favorite Couple (with Syatilla Melvin)	—N/a	Nominated
2016	3rd Melodi Awards	Melodi Film Personality	—N/a	Nominated
2016	3rd Melodi Awards	Melodi Sensational Couple Personality (with Syatilla Melvin)	—N/a	Nominated
2016	Telenovela Awards	Popular Actor Award	Manisnya Cinta Di Cappadoccia	Nominated
2017	29th Malaysian Film Festival	Best Supporting Actor	Interchange	Won
2017	21st Skrin Awards	Best Supporting Actor (Film)	Interchange	Nominated
