= Astro Shaw =

Malaysian film studio

Astro Shaw Sdn Bhd
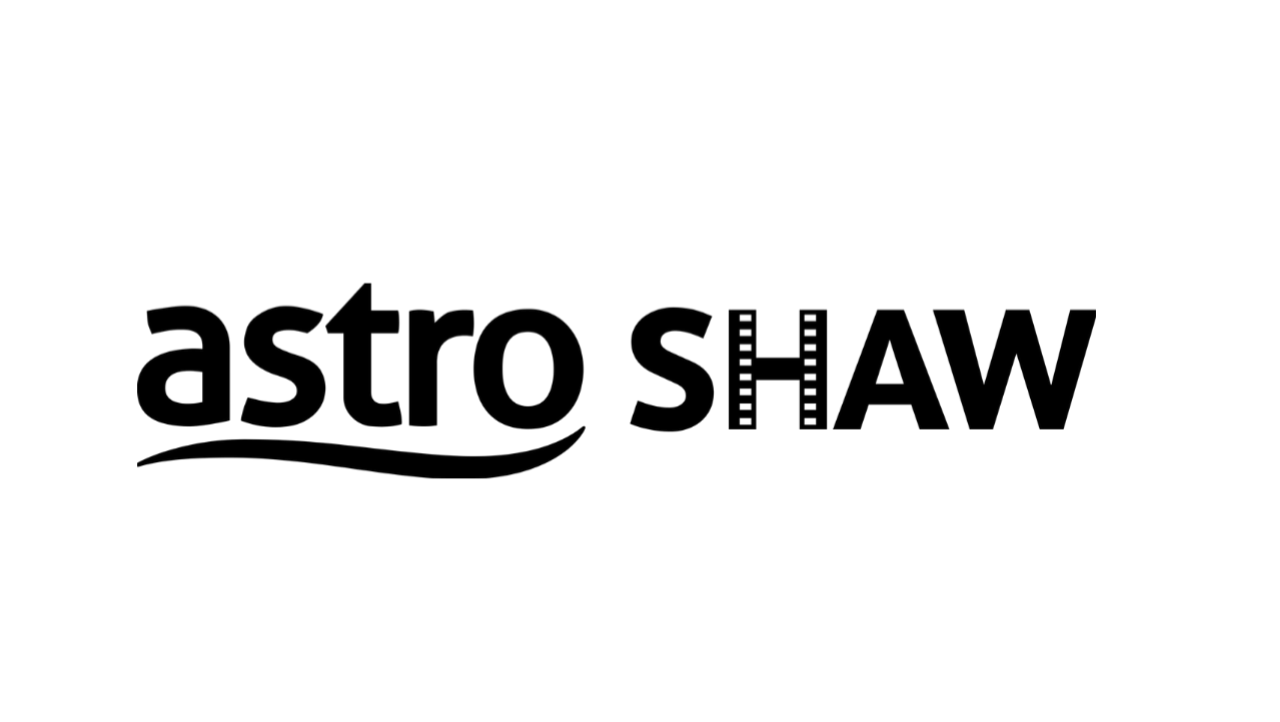
- Type: Private Limited Company
- Industry: Film
- Founded: 4 November 1996; 30 years ago
- Headquarters: Bukit Jalil, Kuala Lumpur, Malaysia, Malaysia
- Area served: Worldwide
- Key people: Raja Jastina Raja Arshad (Head of Astro Shaw & Vice President, Malay Nusantara Business); Norsalvina Alwee @ Vee (Head of Brand & Distribution); Nancy Seow Wai Sum (Head of Business Development & Partnership); Kyle Goonting (Head of Development & Production); Anwari Ashraf (Head of Development & Astro Shaw Ventures Production); Chua Pei Pei (Head of Finance & Administration)
- Services: Film production; Film distribution; Film marketing
- Owner: Astro Malaysia Holdings
- Subsidiaries: Tayangan Unggul; Karya Anggun
- Website: www.astroshaw.com.my

Astro Shaw Sdn Bhd (stylised as astro SHAW) is a Malaysian film studio that has produced films for the local and regional markets and is pursuing expansion into international film investments. It also provides a marketing and distribution services for theatrical and non-theatrical release in Malaysia and abroad.

Astro Shaw has produced 5 of the top 10 highest grossing local films of all time in Malaysia. Astro Shaw's production Hantu Kak Limah was the first local film to achieve a box office collection of over RM30 million. In 2018, Astro Shaw achieved a box office collection of over RM100 million with the combination of films such as Dukun, Paskal, Hantu Kak Limah and Polis Evo 2.

Astro Shaw distributed and marketed the 2019 kids animation film BoBoiBoy Movie 2. After 3 years, Astro Shaw co-produced Mechamato Movie which earned over RM35 million in Malaysia.

== History ==
=== Astro Shaw and Tayangan Unggul ===
Established in 1996 under the Astro Shaw and Tayangan Unggul brand, Astro Shaw produced its first film Nafas Cinta in 1998. The movie starred Awie and was well-received. That film's success allowed Astro Shaw to expand its film production efforts and since 2001, Astro Shaw has released over 80 films. In 2010, Astro Shaw produced its first Chinese language film Woohoo. Since, Astro Shaw has release 5 more Chinese language films including The Journey.

In 2014, Maindhan became Astro Shaw's first Tamil-language Malaysian film. The film had a limited release on 9 August 2014 in Malaysia, Singapore, and Tamil Nadu. It emerged as the highest grossing locally produced Tamil film of all time before being beaten by Vedigundu Pasangge in 2018 which was co-produced by Astro Shaw.

=== Box office ===
From 2010 to 2013, top grossing Malaysian movies only averaged around RM8 million in the local box office. Astro Shaw defied all odds and raised the benchmark for local films in 2014, breaking the RM15 million mark with The Journey (RM17.28 million). The Journey was the first Chinese language film to top the local box office for its respective release year, a feat no other production company had been able to achieve. Their film Hantu Kak Limah, which earned RM36.6 million, became the first local film to surpass RM30 million gross box office (GBO). Polis Evo 3 become Astro Shaw's most successful film when it collected RM54 million in 11 weeks.

=== Accolades ===
Astro Shaw produced its first award-winning film KL Menjerit in 2003. The film won in 8 categories for the 16th Malaysia Film Festival including Best Film and 2 categories during the TV3 Screen Awards.

Following from the success of KL Menjerit, Astro Shaw has gone on to win over 170 awards from local and foreign film festivals.The Journey won best film in the KL Film Critics Awards and Best Non-Malay Language Local Film and the special Jury Award at the 2014 Malaysia Film Festival. The Journey and Ola Bola were selected to compete in the Far East Film Festival.

=== Foreign Film Investments ===
The White Girl (2017), a Hong-Kong film co-directed by Christopher Doyle and Jenny Suen and Astro Shaw's first foray into North Asian films, competed at the 2017 London Film Festival.

Astro Shaw's film The Garden of Evening Mists was nominated in 9 categories for the 56th Golden Horse Awards and won for best Makeup & Costume Design.

In 2022, Astro Shaw invested in 5 Indonesian films: Ben & Jody, Keluarga Cemara 2, Stealing Raden Saleh, Jagat Arwah and Qodrat.

=== Business Expansion ===
Astro Shaw has since ventured beyond film production and into film distribution and marketing. KL Special Force, directed by Syafiq Yusof, and the 2019 children's film BoBoiBoy Movie 2 were distributed and marketed by Astro Shaw.

In 2022, Astro Shaw collaborated with Visinema Pictures from Indonesia for expanding the production of films together, producing 4 films in the same year.

The studio produced, distributed, and marketed the 2022 film Mechamato Movie, which became the most successful box office Malaysian animation film with the collection of RM35.88 million. They also became the main producer of the children's film Didi & Friends The Movie together with Warnakala Studios and Digital Durian.

Astro Shaw become one of the producers for one of the most expensive Malaysian film, MALBATT: Misi Bakara together with Berjaya Pictures, ACT 2 Pictures, Fast Bikes, Aurum Investments Limited and Golden Screen Cinemas directed by Adrian Teh with the budget cost of RM20 million.

On December 3, 2025, Astro Shaw entering an partnership with Double Vision and Philippine ABS-CBN's studios division to co-produce three drama television series, including the remake of 2008 action drama series Kahit Isang Saglit which had starred Jericho Rosales and Carmen Soo.

== Films ==
=== Malay ===
| Year | Title | Language | Producers |
|---|---|---|---|
| 1999 | Nafas Cinta | Malay | |
| 2001 | Sara | Malay | co-production with Tayangan Unggul |
| 2002 | KL Menjerit | Malay | co-production with Tayangan Unggul |
| 2002 | Idola | Malay | co-production with Tayangan Unggul |
| 2003 | Laila Isabella | Malay | co-production with Tayangan Unggul |
| 2003 | Diari Romeo | Malay | co-production with Tayangan Unggul |
| 2004 | Trauma | Malay | co-production with Tayangan Unggul |
| 2004 | Bintang Hati | Malay | co-production with Tayangan Unggul |
| 2004 | Berlari Ke Langit | Malay | co-production with Tayangan Unggul |
| 2004 | Cinta Luar Biasa | Malay | co-production with Tayangan Unggul |
| 2005 | Gangster | Malay | co-production with Tayangan Unggul |
| 2005 | KL Menjerit 1 | Malay | co-production with Tayangan Unggul |
| 2005 | Baik Punya Cilok | Malay | co-production with Tayangan Unggul |
| 2006 | Man Laska | Malay | co-production with Tayangan Unggul |
| 2007 | Syaitan | Malay | co-production with Tayangan Unggul |
| 2007 | Puaka Terbing Biru | Malay | co-production with Tayangan Unggul |
| 2007 | Zombi Kampung Pisang | Malay | co-production with Tayangan Unggul |
| 2007 | Diva | Malay | co-produced with Tarantella Pictures |
| 2007 | Anak Halal | Malay | co-production with Tayangan Unggul |
| 2008 | Kala Malam Bulan Mengambang | Malay | co-production with Tayangan Unggul |
| 2008 | Apa Kata Hati? | Malay | co-production with Tayangan Unggul |
| 2008 | Tipu Kanan Tipu Kiri | Malay | co-produced with Tarantella Pictures |
| 2008 | Histeria | Malay | co-production with Tayangan Unggul |
| 2009 | Maut | Malay | co-production with Tayangan Unggul |
| 2009 | Setem | Malay | co-production with Tayangan Unggul |
| 2009 | Papadom | Malay | co-production with Tayangan Unggul |
| 2009 | Duhai Si Pari-pari | Malay | co-production with Tayangan Unggul |
| 2010 | Lagenda Budak Setan | Malay | co-production with Tarantella Pictures |
| 2010 | Kapoww!! | Malay | co-production with Tayangan Unggul |
| 2010 | Hantu Kak Limah Balik Rumah | Malay | co-production with Tayangan Unggul |
| 2011 | Sini Ada Hantu | Malay | co-produced with Double Vision |
| 2011 | Cun! | Malay | co-production with Tayangan Unggul and Nuansa |
| 2011 | Seru | Malay | co-production with Tayangan Unggul and Hanamia Services |
| 2011 | Tolong Awek Aku Pontianak | Malay | co-production with Tayangan Unggul |
| 2011 | Misteri Jalan Lama | Malay | co-production with Tayangan Unggul |
| 2011 | Ombak Rindu | Malay | co-production with Tarantella Pictures |
| 2012 | Hoore! Hoore! | Malay | a co-production with Real Pictures |
| 2012 | Aku Kau & Dia | Malay | a co-production with Tayangan Unggul |
| 2012 | Untuk 3 Hari | Malay | a co-production with Tarantella Pictures |
| 2012 | Lagenda Budak Setan 2: Katerina | Malay | a co-production with Tarantella Pictures |
| 2013 | Husin, Mon Dan Jin Pakai Toncil | Malay | a co-production with Tayangan Unggul |
| 2013 | Awan Dunia The Movie | Malay | a co-production with Tayangan Unggul |
| 2013 | Langgar | Malay | a co-production with Tayangan Unggul and Hadir Dinamik |
| 2013 | Bikers Kental | Malay | a co-production with Calif Works Productions |
| 2013 | Penanggal | Malay | a co-production with Grand Brilliance |
| 2013 | Papadom 2 | Malay | a co-production with Ismali Holding & Vision Works |
| 2014 | Kami Histeria | Malay | a co-production with Red Films and Marna Films |
| 2014 | Apokalips X | Malay | a co-production with Tayangan Unggul and Naga VXS |
| 2014 | Lagenda Budak Setan 3: Kasyah | Malay | a co-production with Tarantella Pictures |
| 2014 | Amir dan Loqman Pergi Ke Laut | Malay | a co-production with Greenlight Productions |
| 2014 | Mana Mau Lari | Malay | a co-production with Tayangan Unggul and Lineclear Motion Pictures |
| 2014 | Manisnya Cinta Di Cappodocia | Malay | a co-production with Global Station and Red Films |
| 2014 | Terbaik Dari Langit | Malay | a co-production with Playground Productions |
| 2015 | Suamiku, Encik Perfect 10 | Malay | a co-production with Global Station |
| 2015 | Cicak Man 3 | Malay | a co-production with KRU Studios and Grand Brilliance |
| 2015 | Pilot Cafe | Malay | a co-production with Tarantella Pictures |
| 2015 | Polis Evo | Malay | a co-production with Tayangan Unggul |
| 2016 | Langit Cinta | Malay | a co-production with Nuansa |
| 2016 | Ola Bola | Malay / Chinese / English / Tamil | co-production with Golden Screen Cinemas, Multimedia Entertainment & Woohoo Pictures |
| 2016 | Dukun Doktor Dani | Malay | co-production with Balang Rimbun |
| 2016 | Aliff Dalam 7 Dimensi | Malay | co-production with Tayangan Unggul & ChainFX |
| 2017 | Kimchi Untuk Awak | Malay | co-production with Dark Wake Pictures |
| 2017 | Kau Yang Satu | Malay | a co-production with Global Station and Nusana |
| 2017 | Abang Long Fadil 2 | Malay | co-production with Skop Production |
| 2017 | Bisik Pada Langit | Malay | co-production with Nusantara Seni Karya |
| 2017 | Tombiruo: Penunggu Rimba | Malay | a co-production with Ideate Media, Karangkraf and Layar Sunan. |
| 2018 | Busker | Malay | a co-production with Tayangan Unggul |
| 2018 | KL Special Force | Malay | collaboration with Skop Productions, Damofa Productions & Viper Studios |
| 2018 | Dukun | Malay | Originally movie in cinema at 2006, but the movie have a big problem causes the movie is banned until 2018 |
| 2018 | Hantu Kak Limah | Malay | co-production with Infinitus Productions |
| 2018 | PASKAL: The Movie | Malay / English / Somali / Portuguese / Mandarin | co-production with Asia Tropical Films, Golden Screen Cinemas, Multimedia Entertainment and Granatum Ventures |
| 2018 | Polis Evo 2 | Malay | co-production with Surya Citra Media and Blackflag |
| 2019 | Misteri Dilaila | Malay | co-production with Skop Productions |
| 2019 | BoBoiBoy Movie 2 | Malay | collaboration with Animonsta Studios |
| 2019 | Sangkar | Malay | co-production with Primeworks Studios, MM2 Entertainment, and Infinitus Productions |
| 2019 | M For Malaysia | Malay / English | collaboration with Project M Media |
| 2019 | Pusaka | Malay | co-production with Director's Think Tank and Alpha 47 Films |
| 2019 | Wira | Malay | co-production with Multimedia Entertainment, ACT 2 Pictures, Golden Screen Cinemas & Primeworks Studios |
| 2020 | Bulan dan Pria Terhebat | Malay / Indonesia | co-production with Nizra Entertainment & Skop Productions |
| 2020 | Eye on the Ball | Malay / English | collaboration with Star Media Group & CIMB Foundation (production) also with TGV Pictures (distributor) |
| 2020 | Manap Karaoke | Malay | co-production with Enjit Enjit Semut |
| 2020 | Mulut Masin | Malay | co-production with Alpha 47 Films |
| 2020 | Saka Nan Sepi | Malay | co-production with Alpha 47 Films |
| 2021 | Kerana Korona | Malay | collaboration with Wildsnapper TV |
| 2021 | Penunggang Agama | Malay | co-production with Skop Productions |
| 2021 | 18 Puasa Di Kampong Pisang | Malay | co-production with Enjit Enjit Semut |
| 2021 | Kampong Pisang Musikal Raya Istimewa | Malay | co-production with Enjit Enjit Semut |
| 2021 | Chomel | Malay | co-production with Double Vision |
| 2021 | Penunggang Agama 2 | Malay | co-production with Skop Productions |
| 2022 | Kampong Pisang Berbuah Dua Kali | Malay | co-production with Enjit Enjit Semut |
| 2022 | Juang | Malay / English / Mandarin / Tamil / Cantonese | co-production with Asia Tropical Films & The Film Engine |
| 2022 | Abang Long Fadil 3 | Malay / English / Mandarin | co-production with Skop Productions |
| 2022 | Talbis Iblis | Malay | co-production with Infinitus Productions, Jazzy Pictures, A Next Star Productions, MM2 Entertainment & ChainFX |
| 2022 | Mechamato Movie | Malay / English (dub) / Japanese (dub) | co-production with Animonsta Studios - Astro Shaw's first animated film |
| 2023 | Didi & Friends The Movie | Malay | co-production with Warnakala Studios & Digital Durian |
| 2023 | Polis Evo 3 | Malay | co-production with Skop Productions, TGV Cinemas & Blackflag |
| 2023 | Merewang Keluarga Pak Awang | Malay | co-production with Infinitus Productions |
| 2023 | Rahsia | Malay | co-production with Five Star Trading & Kuman Pictures |
| 2023 | MALBATT: Misi Bakara | Malay / English / Somali | co-production with Berjaya Pictures, ACT 2 Pictures & Golden Screen Cinemas - Malaysia's most expensive film |
| 2023 | Gemencheh Boys | Malay / English | co-production with SOL Pictures & GV Corporates Advisory |
| 2024 | Sheriff | Malay / English / Mandarin | co-production with Skop Productions |
| 2024 | The Experts | Malay / English | co-production with Blackflag, ZAK Capital & TGV Pictures |
| 2024 | Gold | Malay / Mandarin / English | co-production with ACT 2 Pictures, One Cool Films & Clover Films |
| 2024 | Baik Punya Ah Long | Malay | co-production with Golden Screen Cinemas & Vision Works |
| 2024 | Don Dukun | Malay | co-production with Golden Screen Cinemas & Infinitus Productions |
| 2024 | Kahar: Kapla High Council | Malay | co-production with Pasal Productions & Alpha47 Films |
| 2024 | Dongeng Sang Kancil | Malay | co-production with Les' Copaque Production |
| 2025 | Keluang Man | Malay / English / Punjabi | co-production with Pasal Productions, Golden Screen Cinemas & Idea River Run |
| 2025 | Martabat: Misi Berdarah | Malay | co-production with ACT 2 Pictures & Golden Screen Cinemas |
| 2025 | Abah Saya, Uncle Mike | Malay | co-production with Le Mediator Studio |
| 2025 | Magik Rompak | Malay | co-production with ACT 2 Pictures, Clover Films & Golden Screen Cinemas |
| 2025 | 3 Hajat | Malay | co-production with KRU Studios |
| 2025 | Qifarah | Malay | co-production with Skop Productions, My Way Pictures & Primeworks Studios |
| 2025 | Malam Terlarang | Malay | co-production with Infinitus Productions |
| 2025 | Banduan | Malay | co-production with Number Twenty One Media & Dream Warrior Pictures |
| 2025 | Papa Zola: The Movie | Malay | co-production with Monsta Studios |
| 2026 | Akad Yang Hilang | Malay | co-production with Playwright Pictures |
| 2026 | Malaikat Malam | Malay / English | co-production with Viper Studios, Skop Productions & Primeworks Studios |
| 2026 | Mikael: Pemburu Dua Alam | Malay | co-production with ACT 2 Pictures & Golden Screen Cinemas |
| 2026 | Tarung: Unforgiven | Malay | co-production with Alpha47 Films & Icon Pictures |
| 2026 | The Furious | Malay | co-production with ACT 2 Pictures, Golden Screen Cinemas & Sunstrong Entertainment |
| 2026 | Polong | Malay | co-production with Golden Star Pictures, Apuu Films, 10 Star Cinemas & Primeworks Studios |
| 2026 | Mojoku Hilang! | Malay / Indonesia / English | co-production with Double Vision, Mocha Chai Laboratories & Argo Films |
| 2026 | Chelot | Malay | co-production with ACT 2 Pictures, Golden Screen Cinemas, Sunstrong Entertainment, Marvelous Culture Films & Primeworks Studios |
| 2026 | Terbang | Malay / English / Cantonese | co-production with Woohoo Pictures, EJJ Films, Enotech, Pegasus Motion Pictures & Aventure Space |
| 2026 | Kudrat 1968: High Council | Malay | co-production with Zak Capital, Enotech, Pegasus Motion Pictures, HM Entertainment & Golden Screen Cinemas |
| 2026 | Baga: Tomorrow Belongs to No One | Malay | co-production with Indigo Films, Skop Productions & Primeworks Studios |
| 2026 | Kacau | Malay | co-production with Le Mediator Studio, Cineworks & Fixi |
| 2026 | Hak: Tuntut atau Tunduk | Malay | co-production with Enotech, Mandarin Motion Pictures, Icon Pictures & Golden Screen Cinemas |
| 2027 | Baran | Malay | co-production with Blackflag & TGV Pictures |
| 2027 | BoBoiBoy Movie 3: Ghost of Gur'latan | Malay | co-production with Monsta Studios |
| 2027 | Black Ops | Malay | co-production with Skop Productions, One Cool Film, Enotech, Komet Productions, Marvelous Culture Films & Golden Screen Cinemas |
| 2027 | Khawarij | Malay | co-production with President Productions |
| 2027 | Wantugo | Malay | co-production with Infinitus Productions |

=== English ===
| Year | Title | Language | Notes |
|---|---|---|---|
| 2009 | Sell Out! | English / Cantonese / Malay | co-production with Amok Films |
| 2020 | The Garden of Evening Mists | English | co-production with CJ Entertainment HBO Asia |
| 2026 | Fleak | English | co-production with Anima Vitae, Impossible Dream Entertainment, Anima Point, Animoon & Godo Films |
| 2026 | Zan Orangutan | English | co-production with KRU Studios & Magika Studios |

=== Tamil ===
| Year | Title | Language | Notes |
|---|---|---|---|
| 2010 | Appalam | Tamil | co-production with Tayangan Unggul |
| 2014 | Maindhan | Tamil | co-production with CK Films and SS Wawasan |
| 2018 | Vedigundu Pasangge | Tamil | co-production with Veedu Production |

=== Chinese (Cantonese, Mandarin and Hokkien) ===
| Year | Title | Language | Notes |
|---|---|---|---|
| 2010 | Woohoo | Cantonese / Mandarin | co-production with Woohoo Pictures |
| 2011 | Great Day | Cantonese | co-production with Woohoo Pictures |
| 2012 | Ghost Buddies | Mandarin / Hokkien | co-production with Double Vision Pictures |
| 2012 | The Collector | Mandarin / Cantonese | co-production with Tayangan Unggul and Asia Tropical Films |
| 2013 | Paper Moon | Mandarin | co-production with Double Vision Pictures and Passion Music & Entertainment |
| 2013 | Once Upon A Time | Cantonese | co-production with The Film Engine |
| 2013 | Cloypot Curry Killer | Mandarin | co-production with Hadir Dinamik |
| 2014 | The Journey | Cantonese / Mandarin / Hokkien | co-production with Woohoo Pictures |
| 2014 | In The Dark | Mandarin / Cantonese | co-production with Amok Films |
| 2017 | You Mean the World to Me | Hokkien / Mandarin | co-production with Real Pictures |
| 2017 | The White Girl | Cantonese / English / Japanese | co-production with Pica Pica Media & Utopia Entertainment |
| 2018 | Think Big Big | Mandarin | co-production with Golden Screen Cinemas, Multimedia Entertainment and MM2 Entertainment |
| 2023 | Ma, I Love You | Mandarin | co-production with Multimedia Entertainment & Woohoo Pictures |
| 2025 | Money Games | Cantonese / Mandarin | co-production with Golden Screen Cinemas |
| 2026 | Sayang Sayang | Mandarin / Malay / Tamil | co-production with Taiwan Creative Content Agency, Taipei Film Commission, Infinitus Productions, HM Entertainment & Applause Entertainment |
| 2026 | Till Death Do Us Part | Mandarin / English / Malay | co-production with Sunstrong Entertainment & Infinitus Productions |
| 2027 | Golden Blessings | Mandarin / Malay | co-production with Enotech, Mandarin Motion Pictures, Sil-Metropole Organisation, Shanghai Pictures, Baozhijie Group & Golden Screen Cinemas |

== Television (Astro Original Series) ==
| Title | Original Run | Original Release | Network | Season | Episode | Status |
|---|---|---|---|---|---|---|
| DO[S]A: The Sacred Sin | 2017 | 14 February 2018 | Astro First | 1 | 8 | Finished |
| Kampong Pisang Bersiri-siri | 2020 – 2021 | 7 December 2020 - 8 March 2021 | Astro Citra | 1 | 14 | Finished |
| Projek: Anchor SPM | 2021 – present | 15 March 2021 – 3 May 2021 | Astro Citra | 1 | 8 | Finished |
| i-Tanggang: Mother of All Lies | 2021 – present | 13 September 2021 – present | Astro Citra | 1 | 12 | Season 2 Episode Order |
| Dukun Diva: They Put The Sham in Shaman | 2021 – 2022 | 6 December 2021 – 24 January 2022 | Astro Citra | 1 | 8 | Finished |
| Kuasa: One Throne. Three Heirs. No Mercy | 2022 – present | 11 April 2022 – present | Astro Citra | 1 | 8 | Finished; Special |
| Histeria The Series | 2022 | 6 June 2022 – 25 July 2022 | Astro Citra | 2 | 8 | Finished |
| Murder By Moonlight: A Getaway To Die For | 2022 – present | 1 August 2022 – present | Astro Citra | 1 | 8 | Finished; Special |
| One Cent Thief | 2022 – present | 8 October 2022 – present | Astro Ria; Astro Go; Astro Vinmeen; Astro Shuang Xing; PRIMEtime; Sooka | 2 | 16 (currently) | Pending |
| Kudeta: Absolute Power Will Corrupt | 2022 – 2023 | 21 November 2022 – 9 January 2023 | Astro Ria; PRIMEtime | 1 | 8 | Finished |
| Project: High Council | 2023 | 14 January 2023 – 18 March 2023 | Astro Ria | 1 | 10 | Finished |
| Liar: Two Sides, One Truth | 2023 | 25 March 2023 – 19 June 2023 | Astro Ria | 1 | 12 | Finished |
| Jack Yusof: Father in Training | 2023 | 17 June 2023 - 5 August 2023 | Astro Ria | 1 | 8 | Finished |
| Riot! A Rebel with a Cause | 2023 | 22 September 2023 - 25 November 2023 | Astro Premier | 1 | 10 | Finished |
| Mystic Village | 2023 - 2024 | 30 October 2023 - 1 January 2024 | Astro Premier | 1 | 10 | Finished |
| Gamers Mangkuk | 2023 - 2024 | 1 December 2023 - 19 January 2024 | Astro Premier | 1 | 8 | Finished |
| I.D | 2024 | 23 February 2024 - 12 April 2024 | Astro Premier | 1 | 8 | Finished |
| Framed | 2024 | 3 May 2024 - 21 June 2024 | Astro Go; Sooka | 1 | 8 | Finished |
| X-Change | 2024 | 12 July 2024 - 13 September 2024 | Astro Go; Sooka | 1 | 10 | Finished |
| Project; Exit | 2024 | 1 November 2024 - 15 November 2024 | Astro Go; Sooka | 1 | 6 | Finished |
| First Wives | 2025 | 11 April 2025 - 23 May 2025 | Astro Go; Sooka | 1 | 8 | Finished |
| Honey Trap | 2025 | 20 June 2025 – 8 August 2025 | Astro One; Sooka | 1 | 8 | Finished |
| Generasi: Perfect 10 | 2025 | 19 September 2025 - 31 October 2025 | Astro One; Sooka | 1 | 8 | Finished |
| Bad Cop | 2025 - 2026 | 19 December 2025 - 30 January 2026 | Astro One; Sooka | 1 | 8 | Finished |
| Good Boys Go to Heaven | 2026 | 8 May 2026 - 26 June 2026 | Astro One; Sooka | 1 | 8 | Finished |
| Kudrat 1968: High Council | 2026 | 11 September 2026 - 16 October 2026 | Astro X3 Sooka | 1 | 4 | Finished |
Upcoming / Special
| Polis Evo: Matyam | TBA | | TBA | | | |
| Keluang Man: The Series | TBA | | TBA | | | |
| Untitled Jack Yusof Sequel | TBA | | Astro Ria | 2 | | New Season Coming Soon |
| Untitled Murder By Moonlight Special | TBA | | Astro Citra | Special only | Special | |
| Kuasa: One Special. Three Heirs. No More Mercy | TBA | | Astro Citra | Special only | Special | |
| Kahit Isang Saglit remake | TBA | | | | | Pending; co-production with ABS-CBN Studios, Star Creatives and Double Vision |
