= Polis Evo =

2015 Malaysian film

- Theatrical release poster
- Directed by: Ghaz Abu Bakar
- Written by: Joel Soh; Kyle Goonting; Anwari Ashraf; Adib Zaini
- Produced by: Joel Soh
- Starring: Shaheizy Sam; Zizan Razak; Nora Danish; Mimi Ernida; Hushairy Hussein; Pablo Amirul
- Cinematography: Harris Hue Abdullah
- Edited by: Nazim Shah
- Music by: Luka Kuncevic
- Production companies: Astro Shaw; Tayangan Unggul
- Distributed by: Astro Shaw
- Release dates: 17 September 2015 (Malaysia & Brunei)
- Running time: 124 minutes
- Country: Malaysia
- Language: Malay
- Budget: MYR 2.4 million
- Box office: MYR 17.8 million

Polis Evo (English: Police Evo) is a 2015 Malaysian Malay-language buddy cop action comedy film directed by Ghaz Abu Bakar and written by Joel Soh, Kyle Goonting, Anwari Ashraf and Adib Zaini. The film casts includes Shaheizy Sam, Zizan Razak, Nora Danish, Mimi Ernida, Hushairy Hussein and Pablo Amirul. The film tells the story of two police officers, Inspector Khai (Shaheizy Sam) and Inspector Sani (Zizan Razak) who have very different personalities but are forced to work together to bring down a drug trafficking operation. The film was released theatrically on 17 September 2015, nationwide.

Polis Evo has won three awards from ten nominated categories during the 28th Malaysian Film Festival. As of 2019, it is currently ranked the ninth highest-grossing Malaysian film of all time.

A sequel, Polis Evo 2 completed filming in January 2018. Zizan Razak and Shaheizy Sam will reprise their lead roles and will be joined by Erra Fazira, Hairul Azreen and also Indonesian star, Raline Shah. A second sequel, Polis EVO 3 was released in 2023.

== Plot ==
An old drug trafficker identified as one Adli Hashim (Wan Hanafi Su) is found dead in a back alley in Kuala Terengganu with hidden drug contraband. Inspector Khai (Shaheizy Sam), the best narcotic inspector from Bukit Aman, Kuala Lumpur has been assigned to investigate the circumstances surrounding it. The case eventually leads towards a cocaine drug trafficking operation somewhere in the state of Terengganu. Although this case is similar to cases handled by Inspector Khai before, he now has to work with Inspector Sani (Zizan Razak); who is more familiar with the intricacies of the state, being his home town. They both have different personalities; Inspector Khai is firm and swift in action, in contrast to Inspector Sani, who is more stoic and prefers to stick to procedures and protocols. Their differences further complicate their mission. Everything changes when the chief criminal, Izrail, begins to involve Inspector Sani's family in the case. Inspector Sani and Khai learn to work together to complete their mission.

== Cast ==
- Shaheizy Sam as Khairul / Inspector Khai
- Zizan Razak as Hassani / Inspector Sani
- Nora Danish as Anis
- Mimi Ernida as Maya Adli
- Harun Salim Bachik as ASP Mokhtar Zain
- Wan Hanafi Su as Adli Hashim
- Hushairy Hussein as Izrail
- Pablo Amirul as Jimbo
- Azliyuszaini Mohd Noor as Jemang
- Amerul Affendi as Mat Yam
- Eyka Farhana as Yati
- Ungku Hariz as Sergeant Sofian

Supporting Cast

- Ariel Ganu as Rafael
- Kamaliah Mat Dom as Sani's mother
- Fadilah Mansor as Khai's mother
- Adnan Dzulkafli as Inspector Ayob
- Sol Azmie as Inspector Harun
- Tisha Shamsir as Sargeant Rosalinda
- Amily Iswadi Amidin as Language Interpreter
- Nazim Shah as Sudin Skodeng

Special Appearance

- T.S. Jeffry as Siamese Boss
- Yank Kassim as Izrail's thug
- A. Galak as Inspector Khai's Supervisor
- Zack Kool as Sani's father
- Faizal Hussein as himself
- Annie Arifin as nurse

== Reception ==
=== Critical reception ===
Kenneth Chaw of The Star rated the movie a 7 out of 10, saying that it "offers big laughs and even bigger action" despite its premise "isn't exactly new". Chaw also lauded the acting of both leads Shaheizy and Zizan, the latter particularly for his "refreshing" performance in a serious role despite being more associated with comedic fares. Haizir Othman of Malaysiakini applauded the storytelling for its honesty and respect for the audience's intelligence.

=== Box-office ===
The film's launch ceremony were held in Hard Rock Cafe, Kuala Lumpur on 3 August 2015. The movie trailer were also released on YouTube on the same date. Subsequently, Polis EVO had its premiere at GSC Pavilion Kuala Lumpur on 3 September 2015. The movie had its theatrical release on 17 September 2015 in 98 cinemas nationwide and also Brunei. After four day of screening, Polis EVO grossed RM2.5 million with total number of screening increased to 101 cinemas. The movies total gross improved to RM8 million after eleven days of release. After three weeks, the total collection continued to soar to RM13 million with cinemas capped at 102 locations. The earnings added another RM2 million after a month, totalling RM15 million. After six weeks, total gross was at RM16 million.

After 60 days in cinema, the total gross reached RM17.8 million, breaking record previously held by 2014's film The Journey (RM16.87 million).

== Theme song ==
"EVO"

Single by Joe Flizzow and SonaOne
- Released: 2015
- Recorded: 2015
- Genre: Hip hop
- Length: 4:17
- Label: Measat Broadcasting; Astro Shaw; Tayangan Unggul
- Songwriters: Audi Mok; Joe Flizzow; SonaOne; Shazee Ishak
- Producers: Measat Broadcasting; Astro Shaw; Tayangan Unggul

The soundtrack for this film is EVO by Joe Flizzow and SonaOne. This song was released on 3 August 2015 at Hard Rock Cafe, Kuala Lumpur.

== Sequel ==
Production for sequel Polis EVO took longer time due to location related issues. Initial plan was to commence shooting prior Ramadhan (around the month of May) 2017. Polis EVO 2 will witness Joel Soh replacing Ghaz Abu Bakar in the director seat and will include Erra Fazira as co-star.

Indonesian actress, Raline Shah will be the female lead replacing Nora Danish in the film. Several clips in social media were uploaded showing her undergoing training exercise with Shaheizy Sam in preparation for the film.

Principal photography for Polis EVO 2 started at end October 2017 at locations in Kuala Lumpur and Kuantan and wrapped in January 2018 with Zizan Razak dan Shaheizy Sam reviving their characters as Police Inspectors, including other stars such as Erra Fazira, Hairul Azreen and Tanta Ginting from Indonesia.
