= Polis Evo 2 =

2018 Malaysian film

- Theatrical release poster
- Directed by: Joel Soh; Andre Chiew
- Written by: Joel Soh; Kyle Goonting; Anwari Ashraf
- Produced by: Joel Soh
- Starring: Shaheizy Sam; Zizan Razak; Raline Shah; Hasnul Rahmat; Erra Fazira
- Cinematography: Tan Teck Zee
- Edited by: Nazim Shah
- Music by: Luka Kuncevic; Paul Morrison; Jon Brooks
- Production companies: Astro Shaw; Surya Citra Media; Blackflag
- Distributed by: Astro Shaw
- Release dates: 22 November 2018 (Malaysia); 18 April 2019 (Indonesia)
- Running time: 138 minutes
- Country: Malaysia
- Languages: Malay; Indonesian
- Budget: MYR 7.8 million
- Box office: MYR 22.45 million

Polis Evo 2 (also known as Police Evo for Indonesian release) is a 2018 Malaysian Malay-language buddy cop action film Co-produced and distributed by Astro Shaw, the film was directed by Joel Soh and Andre Chiew, starring Zizan Razak and Shaheizy Sam reprise their respective roles, with Indonesian actress Raline Shah joined them as the main cast. It revolves Malaysian and Indonesian police to crippled a group of terrorists attacking a hostile village and detaining residents as hostages.

The film was released on 22 November 2018 and is a sequel to the 2015 film of the same title. In December 2018, Polis Evo 2 was listed by the local Malaysian newspaper Harian Metro as among the top 10 local films in Malaysian history. A third sequel of the film was released in May 2023 with Syafiq Yusof took the role as the director.

== Plot ==
In Bongsun, Pahang, a shootout occurs between the Malaysian police and terrorist members of al-Minas. The shooting ends with the leader of al-Minas being heavily injured and captured, while his brother Saif Hasyam, escapes and vowing revenge.

Months later, Inspectors Sani and Khai are involved in a joint operation with Indonesian police to bust a drug deal, led by a drug dealer, Riky. In the chaos, they stumbled upon an undercover Indonesian police, Rian. Unknown of her identity, the officers engaged her, but she managed to flee the scene. She handles intel to her boss, Komisaris Adli Apda, but then realised Apda was Riky's accomplice, who warned Riky about the police raid which allowed him to escape just in time. He tries to kill her, but Rian manages to shoot him.

At the crime scene, Sani and Khai received a tip that the al-Minas faction is having a trade at Pulau Cherong (fictional island) with Riky. They head to the island with two more officers, Lah and Dan. During the reconnaissance, they stumbled Rian again, whose intention was to find and capture Riky when the deal became botched. The situation goes awry when an army of al-Minas terrorists launches gas in the island, taking every villager as hostages. Khai is separated while tailing a terrorist, Lah is killed in the shootout, while Sani and Dan are captured.

Khai returns to the scene and finds an unconscious Rian, but he gets knocked down by an exploding gas tank. In Kuala Lumpur, police head SAC Dato Azizat Mansor tries to negotiate with Saif, the current leader of al-Minas. Saif demands his brother to be handed back to him within hours. However, he kills two hostages when the police are unable to make his request within the time given. In response, they sent a 10-men UKAP (Unit Khas Anti-Pengganas) operatives to rescue the hostages.

Khai wakes up, and sets out to call for help with Rian. They powered up a communications tower and warned HQ about the presence of a radar in the island, meaning any movement can be detected within the area. However, the tactical team had already begun the raid, and walked into an ambush leaving six operatives dead. Khai and Rian assisted in neutralising the remaining attackers, and regrouped with the remaining four operatives.

Sani and Dan overpowered their captors and held Saif at gunpoint. However, Saif's men managed to subdue the duo, and execute Dan in retaliation. Meanwhile, Khai decides to proceed in rescuing Sani, despite being told not to do so as they have limited support. Nevertheless, the four UKAP operatives volunteered to help, as well as Rian. Khai also sets up a rescue plan: send a fake body planted with explosives to Saif, and rescue the hostages during the handover, which HQ agrees.

They rescued the 200 villagers, along with Sani and took them to shelter. Sani blames himself for Dan's death, and Khai tells him to proceed his duty to protect his country. They also find a dead Riky, where his cellphone reveals Apda was his accomplice, and they apologize to Rian for not trusting her.

As soon as the terrorists received the fake body, the bomb exploded, and the seven officers start their attack. The four UKAP operators are killed, while Khai is heavily injured in a fistfight. Sani kills the remaining attackers, but is shot by Saif. As Saif prepares to execute him, Khai arrives just in time to shoot Saif.

They survived the incident and are recovering from their wounds. The film ends with them enjoying the view of the beach.

== Cast ==
- Shaheizy Sam as Khairul / Inspector Khai, Narcotics CID
- Zizan Razak as Hassani / Inspector Sani, Narcotics CID
- Raline Shah as Rian, Indonesian National Police
- Hasnul Rahmat as Hafsyam Jauhari / Saif
- Mike Lucock as Najr
- Erra Fazira as SAC Dato' Azizat Mansor, Head of Narcotics CID
- Syafie Naswip as Mat Dan, Narcotics CID
- Riz Amin as Sergeant Amin Galah, Narcotics CID
- Jeff Catz as Syam, UKAP Team Leader
- Hairul Azreen as Zul, UKAP
- Fir Rahman as Mikael, UKAP
- Dennis Yin as Zack Lee "Zali", UKAP
- Soffi Jikan as Qalif
- Tanta Ginting as Riky Kumolo
- Azlym Aziz as Abbad
- Siraj Alsagoff as Sab, UKAP
- Kazar Razak as Kamal, UKAP
- Hadi Nawawi as Arshad, UKAP
- Zainal Mohd Isa as Paan, UKAP
- Zaid Moheyer as Rikko, UKAP
- Don Syuzefril as Shahrul, UKAP
- Rusdi Ramli as Commander Maarof
- Hairie Othman as Khalid
- Jay Iswazir as Zairi
- Hafidzuddin Fazil as DSP Wazir Abdul Hamid
- Jasper Supayah as Agnes
- Cok Simbara as Komisaris Adli Apdal
- Azwan Kombos as Brother Khai
- Nelissa Nizam as Ain
- Amai Kamaruddin as Andre
- Arthur Tobing as Imam Husyairi
- Samsuri Shahrom as villager
- Charlie Numan Salleh as villager

== Production ==
The production for Polis EVO 2 took too long to begin due to difficulties to choose the filming location. The original plan was to begin filming prior to Ramadhan of 2017. Producer Joel Soh took the role as director, replacing Ghaz Abu Bakar who directed the first movie. For the movie, he directed with Andre Chiew. According to Soh: "For us, pre-production is a year-round process, expensive screenplay take a month, everything is carefully designed. We do not just put on a person's costumes without looking in. We see what goes into paramedics, sniper tools and all that."

Zizan Razak and Shaheizy Sam reprised their respective roles, with new actors including Hairul Azreen, Hasnul Rahmat, Shafie Naswip, Riz Amin and Erra Fazira. Singapore actors Fir Rahman and Jeff Catz along with Indonesian actress Raline Shah joined the cast of Polis EVO 2. Zizan was reportedly injured when doing a stunt action during the filming. Filming began in October 2017, mostly in Pahang, particularly the Paku Island.

== Release and reception ==
Polis EVO 2 was released on 22 November 2018 to commercial success. It garnered box-office gross at a total of RM20 million 17 days after its release, surpassing the prequel. The film was released in Indonesia on 18 April 2019 and retitled as Police Evo with its theatrical release poster redesigned with a new, features picture of Raline Shah displayed above, while other cast members displayed below. It became the first Polis EVO movie to be released there.

Writing for Star2, Kenneth Chaw called the film as "a courageous film" and gave 7.5 out of 10 stars. He said: "No one expected this from an action flick but Polis Evo 2 unwittingly addresses the importance of taking care of our emotional health". Aidil Rusli from The Malay Mail praise the film and said, "...a film that knows its formula very well, sticks to it, does all the things that it needs to do successfully, and it's also done with a level of craft that does not insult our eyes, ears and intelligence."

== Soundtrack ==
"Sang Saka Biru"

Single by Joe Flizzow, Altimet, Alif Abdullah & SonaOne
- Language: Malay
- Released: October 14, 2018
- Recorded: 2018
- Length: 3:22
- Label: Rocketfuel Entertainment
- Composer: SonaOne
- Lyricists: Joe Flizzow; Altimet; Alif Abdullah
- Producer: Joe Flizzow (Johan Ishak)

The film was filled by one main original soundtrack with Joe Flizzow and SonaOne returned as lyricist, composer and performer while Altimet and Alif Abdullah joined as lyricist and all four artist performed together titled "Sang Saka Biru". The song was originally have six verse created in one week composed by SonaOne but he and Alif told that they have chosen the best version to presented to audience.

== Controversy ==
On 10 November 2018, prior to the official theatrical release, Polis EVO 2 became a controversial subject when it was alleged to contain scenes offensive to Islam, which led to PAS Committee head Dr Riduan Md Nor calling on all Malaysians to boycott the movie. The Ministry of Home Affairs Malaysia (KDN) had earlier issued a statement to investigate the matter. Federal Territories Mufti Zulkifli Mohamad Al-Bakri, stated that Polis EVO 2 does not contain messages insulting to Islam.

== Awards ==
Year	Awards	Nominated works	Category	Result
2019	30th Malaysian Film Festival	Hasnul Rahmat	Best Supporting Actor	Won
2019	30th Malaysian Film Festival	Joel Soh & Andre Chiew	Promising Director	Nominated
