= List of Malaysian films of 2013 =

This is a list of Malaysian films produced and released in 2013. Most of the film are produced in the Malay language, but there also a significant number of films that are produced in English, Mandarin, Cantonese, Hokkien and Tamil.

== 2013 ==
=== Film list ===
Opening		Title	Director	Cast	Genre	Notes	Ref.
J A N U A R Y	3	Minyak Dagu	Azhari Mohd Zain	Fezrul Khan, Yana Samsudin, Fizo Omar	Horror	MIG Pictures	
J A N U A R Y	17	Paper Moon	Stanley Law	Gordon Lam, Chrissie Chau, Tedd Chan	Drama / Romance	Double Vision; Mandarin-language film	
J A N U A R Y	24	Juvana	Faisal Ishak	Zahiril Adzim, Johan As'ari, Syazwan Zulkfili, Sharnaaz Ahmad, Syafie Naswip, Adlin Aman Ramli, Shera Aiyob	Action / Drama	Filmscape	
J A N U A R Y	31	Wawa Semput	Ismail Bob Hasim	Yana Samsudin, Angah Raja Lawak, Along Cham, Adibah Yunus	Comedy	Metrowealth Pictures; A spin-off of the Adnan Sempit franchise	
F E B R U A R Y	7	Hantu Kak Limah 2: Husin, Mon & Jin Pakai Toncit	Mamat Khalid	Awie, Usop Wilcha, Delimawati, Avaa Vanja, Zami Ismail, Man Kadir, Rashidi Ishak	Comedy / Horror	Tayangan Unggul; Preceded by Hantu Kak Limah Balik Rumah (2010)	
F E B R U A R Y	7	The Wedding Diary 2	Adrian Teh	Ah Niu, Elanne Kwong, Kara Hui, Jack Choo	Comedy / Romance	Asia Tropical Films; Mandarin-language film Preceded By The Wedding Diary	
F E B R U A R Y	7	Once Upon a Time	Silver Yee	Jack Lim, Gan Mei Yan, Vivian Tok, Jeff Chin, Royce Tan	Comedy	The Film Engine; Cantonese-language film	
F E B R U A R Y	14	Kerat 14	Arjin Uppal	Aaron Aziz, Siti Saleha, Fouziah Ghous	Action / Mystery / Suspense	White Merpati Entertainment	
F E B R U A R Y	21	Gangster Celop	Ahmad Idham	Syamsul Yusof, Kamal Adli, Hanis Zalikha, Yus Raja Lawak	Action / Crime	Excellent Pictures-Skop Production co-production	
F E B R U A R Y	21	Pada Suatu Cinta Dahulu	Hashim Rejab	Intan Ladyana, Niezam Zaidi, Wawa Zainal, Zalif Sidek, Aren Yunus	Comedy / Romance	Metrowealth Pictures	
F E B R U A R Y	28	Rock Oo!: Rimba Bara Kembali	Mamat Khalid	Que Haidar, Khir Rahman, Sofi Jikan, Pekin Ibrahim, Azmi Black	Drama / Musical	Primeworks Studios	
M A R C H	7	Cerita Kita	Pierre Andre	Yana Samsudin, Pekin Ibrahim, Fezrul Khan	Romance	Metrowealth Pictures	
M A R C H	7	Lawak Ke Der 2	Hans Isaac	Zizan Razak, Johan Raja Lawak, Afdlin Shauki, Harun Salim Bachik, Harith Iskander, Nabil Ahmad	Comedy	Tall Order Production; Adapted from the stage play of the same name	
M A R C H	14	Awan Dania The Movie	Rashid Sibir	Scha Alyahya, Elly Mazlein, Rusdi Ramli, Jehan Miskin	Comedy / Romance	Tayangan Unggul	
M A R C H	14	Ops Kossa Dappa 3	K. Annan Joseph	Loganathan, Sasi Kumar, Jasmine Micheal, Buveni Ann Mayan, Nilasha, Amber Chia, Priyanka Kothari, Kadhal Dhandabani	Action / Science-Fiction	ATV Pictures; Tamil-language film	
M A R C H	21	Bola Kampung The Movie	Wong Kuan Loong	Ezlynn, Afdlin Shauki, Harris Alif, Aznil Nawawi, Adila Shakir, Baki Zainal, Marsha Milan Londoh	Adventure / Animation	Animasia Studios; Based on the television animation, Bola Kampung	
M A R C H	21	Gila-Gila Remaja 2	V Nagaraj	Hairul Azreen, Faralyna Idris, Fizz Fairuz, Taiyuddin Bakar	Action / Comedy	Megamovie	
M A R C H	28	Sembunyi: Amukan Azazil	Kabir Bhatia	Diana Danielle, Remy Ishak, Umie Aida, Sharnaaz Ahmad, Fizo Omar	Fantasy / Horror	Primeworks Studios	
A P R I L	4	2 Kalimah	Eyra Rahman	Shaheizy Sam, Nora Danish, Yana Samsudin, Wan Hanafi Su	Romance	MIG Pictures	
A P R I L	11	Langgar	Syed Hussein Syed Mustafa	Ady Putra, Hans Isaac, Namron, Khir Rahman, Natasha Hudson, Zul Huzaimy, Nadia Heng, Bell Ngasri	Action	Tayangan Unggul	
A P R I L	18	Kecoh! Hantu Raya Tok Chai	Opie Zami	Saiful Apek, Intan Ladyana, Sathiya, Azrul Cham, Amir Raja Lawak, Sobri Anuar, Kuswadinata	Comedy / Horror	3Line Media	
A P R I L	25	Mencari Cinta	Shirin Khuzaimi	Rusdi Ramli, Nora Danish, Riezman Khuzaimi, Connie Ahmad	Romance	Armnet Integrated	
M A Y	2	Bisikan Syaitan	Faizul A. Rashid	Fizz Fairuz, Nabila Huda, Wan Sharmila, Azam Pitt	Horror	Primeworks Studios	
M A Y	9	Kaliyugha	S. T. Bala	S. T. Bala, Geethanjali, Sharmini Ramesh	Drama	Fenomena Seni Produksi; Tamil-language film	
M A Y	9	99 Kali Rindu	Azhari Mohd Zain	Aeril Zafrel, Wawa Zainal, Adey Syafrien, Fizo Omar, Diana Amir, Siti Aziz	Drama / Romance	MIG Pictures	
M A Y	16	O.M.K (Oh Mak Kau!)	Nurul Ain Nordin	Shuib Sepahtu, Jep Sepahtu, Nurul Ain Nordin, Syamsul Yusof, Didie Alias, Wan Maimunah, Yassin Yahya	Action / Comedy	Star Scope Production	
M A Y	23	Olli	P. Rameesh	Pushpa Narayan, Shashi Tharan	Action / Science-Fiction	Nova Rimbun; Tamil-language film	
M A Y	23	Bikers Kental	Helmi Yusof	Zizan Razak, Awie, Zul Ariffin, Bront Palarae, Amerul Affendi, Sufian Mohamed, Pornwippa Watcharakaroon, Julangtip Sukkasem, Harun Salim Bachik	Comedy	Astro Shaw	
M A Y	30	KIL	Nik Amir Mustapha	Redza Minhat, Cristina Suzanne Stockstill	Drama / Romance / Mystery	Primeworks Studios	
M A Y	30	Bro, Nampak Motor Gua?	Mohd Razif Rashid	Along Cham, Along Eyzendy, Mon Ryanti, Mamat Khalid, Shah Rempit, Fadzil Zahari	Action / Comedy	MIG Pictures	
J U N E	6	Lari	Ahmad Idham	Aaron Aziz, Dira Abu Zahar, Erin Malek, Hazama Azmi	Action	Excellent Pictures	
J U N E	13	Pecah	Asrull Hisyam	Tony Eusoff, Sofi Jikan, Izreen Azminda, Fizz Fairuz	Action / Thriller	Primeworks Studios	
J U N E	20	Tokak	Sabree Fadzil	Abon, Joey Daud, Faiz Raja Lawak, Airis Yasmin, Kazar	Comedy / Horror	MIG Production	
J U N E	27	1 Lawan Satu	Pierre Andre	Mikail Andre, Fyza Kadir, Along Eyzendy	Action	MIG Production	
J U L Y	18	Olipathivu	Elson Tommas	Vassan, Sivabaalan, Govind Singh, Sasi Kumar, Xavier Lock-up, Devika Raghavakrishnan, Maney Villanz & Samuel Sam	Action / Thriller	Snap Production; Tamil-language film	
J U L Y	25	Misteri Bisikan Pontianak	M. Subash Abdullah	Ruminah Sidek, Mislina Mustaffa, Zakri, Haqim Omar	Thriller / Mystery	Genius Parade	
A U G U S T	1	Kara King	Namewee	Namewee, Frankie Gao, Ng Man-Tat	Comedy / Family	Prodigee Media; Mandarin-language film	
A U G U S T	8	Adnan Sempit 3	Ismail Bob Hasim	Shaheizy Sam, Intan Ladyana, Along Cham, Yana Samsudin, Angah Raja Lawak	Comedy	MIG Production; Preceded by Adnan Sempit (2010) and Adnan Sempit 2 (2012)	
A U G U S T	8	Lemak Kampung Santan	Hans Isaac	Hans Isaac, Neelofa, Harun Salim Bachik, Awie, Khir Rahman, Natasha Hudson	Romance	Tall Order Production	
A U G U S T	15	Ge Mei Lia	Euho	William Yap, Mingirl Loh, Edmund Chen, Lynn Lim, Melvin Sia, Joannabelle Li	Comedy	Asia Tropical Films; Mandarin-language film	
A U G U S T	22	Paku Pontianak	Ismail Bob Hasim	Pekin Ibrahim, Hidayah Samsudin, Uqasha Senrose, Adibah Yunus, Along Eyzendy, Sidek Hussain, Ruminah Sidek	Horror	MIG Pictures	
A U G U S T	29	KL Zombi	Ming Jin	Zizan Razak, Siti Saleha, Izara Aishah, Iedil Putra, Zain Hamid, Azhan Rani, Faezah Elai, Usop Wilcha	Action / Comedy / Horror	Primeworks Studios	
A U G U S T	29	Tanda Putera	Shuhaimi Baba	Rusdi Ramli, Zizan Nin, Faezah Elai, Linda Hashim	Action / Drama / Suspense	Pesona Pictures	
S E P T E M B E R	5	Dhusrajanam	M. Suurya	M. Subash Abdullah, Kalpana Sundraju	Sport / Drama	Genius Parade; Tamil-language film	
S E P T E M B E R	5	Psiko: Pencuri Hati	Namron	Bront Palarae, Sharifah Amani, Sein Ruffedge, Amerul Affendi, Shera Ayob, Julia Ziegler	Action / Drama / Suspense	Filmmecca Studio	
S E P T E M B E R	12	Lagenda Budak Hostel	Ismail Bob Hasim	Along Cham, Along Eyzendy, Angah Raja Lawak, Nora Danish, Atikah Suhaimie, Rahim R2, Pekin Ibrahim, Epy Raja Lawak, Mikail Andre	Drama / Romance	MIG Pictures	
S E P T E M B E R	12	Vikingdom	Yusry Abdul Halim	Dominic Purcell, Craig Fairbrass, Natassia Malthe, Conan Stevens, Jon Foo	Adventure	KRU International; English-language film	
S E P T E M B E R	19	Maraimugam	Sara.R	Mogan, Krishnapriya	Comedy	Boss Pictures; Tamil-language film	
S E P T E M B E R	19	Dampak	Andy Mak, Lai Yuk Long	Aaron Aziz, Farid Kamil, Michael Chin, Intan Ladyana, Juliana Evans, Scha Alyahya	Action	Ops Picture	
S E P T E M B E R	26	Bencinta	Eyra Rahman	Farid Kamil, Nora Danish, Uqasha Senrose, Zalif Sidek, Fezrul Khan, Qi Razali	Romance	MIG Pictures	
O C T O B E R	3	Ghost Ghost, Ghosts!	M. Subash Abdullah	Renaise, Jackson, Eric Chen, Lenny Ooi, Susan Leong, Alice Yap	Horror	Genius Parade; Mandarin-language film	
O C T O B E R	3	KL Gangster 2	Syamsul Yusof	Aaron Aziz, Syamsul Yusof, Ady Putra, Zizan Razak, Sofi Jikan, Rosyam Nor	Action	Skop Productions & Grand Brilliance; Preceded by KL Gangster (2011)	
O C T O B E R	10	Longkai	Hashim Rejab	Faizal Hussein, Erra Fazira, Eddie, Wawa Zainal, Pierre Andre, Niezam Zaidi, Dira Abu Zahar, Zul Handyblack, Along Eyzendy, Mikail Andre	Action / Romance	MIG Pictures	
O C T O B E R	17	Hello	A. R. Badul	Tauke Jambu, Angah Raja Lawak, Along Cham, Fizo Omar, Herman Tino, Acong SweetChild	Comedy / Romance	Nusanbakti Corporation	
O C T O B E R	24	Balada Pencinta	Khir Rahman	Johan As'ari, Siti Saleha, Sein Ruffedge, Iedil Putra, Miera Leyana	Drama / Romance	Primeworks Studios	
O C T O B E R	31	Highland Tower	Pierre Andre	Mikail Andre, Shima Anuar, Adibah Yunus, Eddie	Thriller / Horror	MIG Pictures	
N O V E M B E R	7	Malam.... Penuh Bermisteri	Shasha Omar	Shasha Omar, Rahim Razali, Azri Iskandar, Bell Ngasri, Acong SweetChild	Thriller / Mystery	SK Movie Makers	
N O V E M B E R	14	Aku Pilih Kamu	Eyra Rahman	Fezrul Khan, Intan Ladyana, Azhan Rani	Drama / Romance	MIG Pictures	
N O V E M B E R	14	Firefly	Michael Chuah	Henry Thia, Bernard Hiew, Lim Ching Miau, Michael Chuah	Action / Comedy / Superhero	Evo Pictures; Mandarin-language film	
N O V E M B E R	21	Kisah Paling Gengster	Brando Lee	Shaheizy Sam, Epy Raja Lawak, Mikail Andre, Wawa Zainal, Zul Handyblack, Wan Hanafi Su, Fyza Kadir	Action / Drama	B & L Kreatif	
N O V E M B E R	21	Hantu Tok Mudim	Wan Mohd Hafiz Wan Hussein	Harun Salim Bachik, Sofi Jikan, Izzue Islam, A. R. Badul, Adrea Abdullah	Comedy / Horror	Showbiz Production	
N O V E M B E R	28	Penanggal	Ellie Suriati	Azri Iskandar, Zul Arifin, Ummi Nazeera, Fasha Sandha	Horror	Astro ShawGrand Brilliance	
N O V E M B E R	28	Ustaz, Mu Tunggu Aku Datang	Pierre Andre	Shahrol Shiro, Ajak Shiro, Ustaz Azhar Idrus, Along Eyzendy, Mikail Andre, Zalif Sidek	Drama	MIG Pictures	
D E C E M B E R	5	Ular	Jason Chong	Lisa Surihani, Yusry Abdul Halim, Izzue Islam	Horror	Showbiz Production	
D E C E M B E R	5	Kolumpo	Sheikh Munasar, Rozi Izma, Bront Palarae	Sharifah Amani, Azad Jasmin, Nell Ng, Ruminah Sidek, Sofi Jikan, Amirul Ariff, Mano Maniam	Drama	Otto Films; English-, Tamil-, Cantonese-language film	
D E C E M B E R	12	Paku	P. Rameesh	Aishah Ilias, Johan As'ari, Azad Jasmin, Diana Johor, Kamal Adli, Zaidi Omar	Horror	Nusantara Seni Karya	
D E C E M B E R	12	Papadom 2	Afdlin Shauki	Afdlin Shauki, Liyana Jasmay, Noorkhiriah, Vanida Imran, Khir Rahman, Riezman Khuzaimi, Scha Alyahya, Chelsia Ng, Hans Isaac, Pete Teo	Comedy	Tayangan Unggul, Astro Shaw, Ismail Holdings & Vision Works	
D E C E M B E R	19	Laki-Laki	Ahmad Rusli Mohamed Khadri	Angah Raja Lawak, Zul Handyblack, Adey Syafrien, Mie Raja Lawak, Azrel Ismail	Comedy	MIG Pictures	
D E C E M B E R	19	Cinderella	Ahmad Idham	Fizo Omar, Nelydia Senrose, Kamal Adli, Fauziah Nawi, Azizah Mahzan, Azlan Komeng, Jalaluddin Hassan	Romance	Excellent Pictures	
D E C E M B E R	26	Chikaro	Nizam Zakaria	Izzue Islam, Adleena Nordin, Liyana Jasmay, Tasha Shilla, Izara Aishah	Comedy	Showbiz Production	
D E C E M B E R	26	Tokan	Ghaz Abu Bakar	Johan As'ari, Zizan Razak, Pekin Ibrahim, Sofi Jikan, Wan Hanafi Su, Liyana Jasmay, Wanna Ali	Action / Comedy	Pencil Pictures	
