= Nabila Huda =

Malaysian actress (born 1984)

- نبيلا هدى
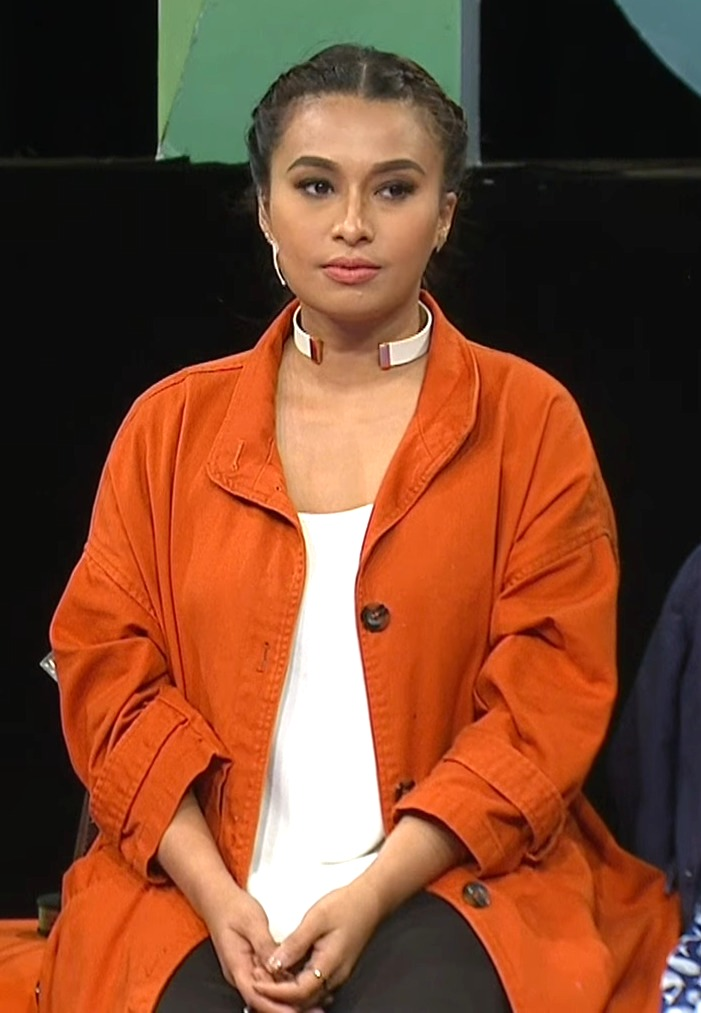
- Nabila was interviewed on the show MeleTOP on Astro Ria on 6 September 2016.
- Born: Nabila Huda binti Suhaimi; 2 December 1984 (age 41); Kuala Lumpur, Malaysia
- Other name: Abil
- Education: Sijil Pelajaran Malaysia (SPM)
- Occupations: Actor; Television Host
- Years active: 2000–present
- Spouse: Zaidi Zailani (m. 2008; div. 2011) Mohd. Izwan Johar (m. 2015)
- Children: 1
- Father: Amy Search(Biological father)
- Website: https://nabilahuda.com/

Nabila Huda binti Suhaimi (born 2 December 1984) is a Malaysian actress. She is the eldest daughter of musician Amy Search, the vocalist of the rock band Search. Nabila began her acting career in 2001 with a small role in Lagi-Lagi Senario, which was directed by Aziz M. Osman.

Her film appearances include: Rock (2005), Bohsia: Jangan Pilih Jalan Hitam (2009), Bohsia 2: Jalan Kembali (2012), and Munafik (2016), for which she won Best Actress at the 28th Malaysia Film Festival. She also appeared in Makrifat Cinta (2018). On television, she has had roles in Impak Maksima the Series, Cinta Untuk Ain, Dari Mata Arisa, Teduhan Kasih, and Dendam Aurora.

== Early life ==
Nabila Huda was born on 2 December 1984, in Kuala Lumpur. She is the eldest child of singer Suhaimi Abdul Rahman, better known as Amy Search.

== Early career ==
Nabila began acting in 2000 while preparing for the Sijil Pelajaran Malaysia examination. She initially managed her own career and learned acting on set. She played a small role in Lagi-Lagi Senario (2001), directed by Aziz M. Osman, and later appeared in the telefilm Blok 404 (2004) with Zamarul Hisham.

In 2005, she appeared as Nurfarzana in Mamat Khalid's musical comedy Rock, alongside Que Haidar, Khir Rahman, and Soffi Jikan. She later had a guest role in Bujang Senang (2006), directed by Abdul Razak Mohaideen, and played Noni in the Malaysian drama film Akhirat, which earned her a nomination for Best Supporting Actress at the 21st Malaysia Film Festival.

Nabila acted in Impak Maksima the Series as Shikin, directed by Ahmad Idham. In 2008, she appeared in the drama Ibu, with Hamidah Wahab, followed by lead roles in Bahang Ravina with Jasmin Hamid; and Rencong with Soffi Jikan.

== Career ==
Nabila released her first solo single, "X-Ray" produced by Edrie Hashim. In a 2018 interview, she described her brief musical career as "embarrassing".

She gained broader attention in 2009 for her role in Bohsia: Jangan Pilih Jalan Hitam, directed by Syamsul Yusof. The film was commercially successful, and her performance earned nominations for Best Actress at the 22nd Malaysia Film Festival and 2009 Screen Awards.

Nabila made a special appearance as Natasha in the comedy film Pisau Cukur (2009) directed by Bernard Chauly, featuring Nur Fazura and Maya Karin. She later acted in the fantasy romantic film Duhai Si Pari-Pari with Liyana Jasmay and Que Haidar. Nabila returned to television as the lead in the 13-episode melodrama Cinta Untuk Ain, again opposite Que Haidar, which aired on Slot Lestary TV3.

Nabila reprised her role as Tasya in the film Jalan Kembali: Bohsia 2 (2012), a sequel to Bohsia: Jangan Pilih Jalan Hitam (2009). Her performance earned a Screen Award nomination for Best Actress (2012).

In 2013, she starred alongside Pekin Ibrahim and child actress Puteri Balqis in the TV3 drama series Balqis. In the same year, she appeared with Fizz Fairuz in the horror thriller Bisikan Syaitan, directed by Faizul A. Rashid, playing the role of Soraya.

For her performance in Balqis, Nabila won Best Actress at the 2014 Screen Awards. She later portrayed singer Saloma in a two-episode biographical telefilm titled Saloma, directed by Melissa Saila. She described the role as one of the most challenging of her career. She subsequently played Liyana in the drama series Ariana Rose, appearing with Nur Fathia, Arja Lee and Keith Foo.

In 2015, Nabila appeared in the horror film paranormal thriller Gamatisme, directed by Yeop Hitler Zami, and co-starring Syazwan Zulkifly. She also acted in the drama Akulah Balqis, directed by Fazli "Pali" Yahya, once again appearing with Puteri Balqis.

She made her stage debut in the theatrical adaptation of Hamka's novel Tenggelamnya Kapal Van Der Wijck, staged at the Istana Budaya (IB) from 12 to 18 October 2015. She also hosted the travelogue show Awak Kat Mana on Astro Ria.

In 2016, Nabila appeared in Syamsul Yusof's horror film Munafik, playing the character Maria. Her performance earned her Best Actress at the 28th Malaysia Film Festival and Best Supporting Actress at the Kuala Lumpur Film Critics Association Awards. She also received nominations for Best Actress (Film) at the 2016 Screen Awards and MeleTOP Film Star at the MeleTOP Era Awards 2017.

In late 2016, Skop Productions announced a sequel to Munafik. In March 2017, Nabila withdrew from the project due to scheduling conflicts and was replaced by Maya Karin in Munafik 2. Nabila next appeared in the telenovela Dendam Aurora, portraying the character Aurora Abdullah.

Her next appearance was in the romantic biographical drama film Makrifat Cinta.

She acted in the online drama KL Gangster: Underworld, co-directed by Syafiq Yusof and Faisal Ishak, starring Beto Kusyairy and Zahiril Adzim. The series, based on the KL Gangster trilogy by Syamsul Yusof, began airing on iflix on 16 August 2018. Nabila appeared with Bront Palarae in the anthology drama Folklore, which began airing on HBO Asia on 7 October 2018.

She appeared in the music video for Ragaman by Faizal Tahir.

In 2019, Nabila performed in the staging of Ola Bola The Musical from 18 February to 3 March 2019 at Istana Budaya, alongside Douglas Lim.

== Personal life ==
Nabila married Zaidi Zailani in 2008, and they have a daughter named Ksha Laila, born in 2009. The couple divorced in 2011.

On 25 December 2015, Nabila married Mohd Izwan Johar, a café chef. She received a dowry of RM300.

Nabila revealed in August 2018 that she had not seen her father, Amy Search, for three years, and noted a disagreement with her stepmother, Norhasniza Hassan.

== Filmography ==
=== Films ===
Year	Title	Character	Notes
2001	Lagi-Lagi Senario	Warung Azlee Customers	First film, additional actor
2004	Blok 404	Nurisa	
2005	Rock	Nurfarazana @ Foxy Lady	
2006	Bujang Senang	Melly	Special appearance
2007	Cinta Yang Satu	Farah	
2008	Akhirat	Noni	
2009	Bohsia: Jangan Kili Jalan Hitam	Tasha	
2009	Razor	Natasha	Special appearance
2009	Duhai Si Pari-pari	Mala	
2012	Jalan Kembali: Bohsia 2	Tasha	
2013	Bisikan Syaitan	Soraya	
2013	Juvana	Nurse	Special appearance
2014	Yasmine	Nurul	Brunei Film
2015	Gamatism	Zara	
2016	Munafik	Maria	
2017	Tombiruo: Penunggu Rimba	Wan Suraya	
2017	Rempit Sampai Langit	Comel	
2018	Makrifat Cinta	Zara	
2019	Wangi	Bella	
2020	M4M4	Aini	
2021	Petaka	Ima	
2022	Renjana	Che Aminah	
2022	Halimun	Laila	
2023	Harum Malam	Sarjan Zehan	
2023	Rahsia	Ramlah	
2023	Budak Flat	Joey	
2024	Pemburu Saka	Dukun Female	
2024	Memoir Seorang Guru	Kamariah (Adult)	
2024	Abnormal: Savage	Dahliya	Guest actor
2025	Telaga Suriram	Maimon	
2025	Gayong	Che Som	

=== Drama ===
Year	Title	Character	TV Channels	Note
2002	Kisah Benar (Season 23)		TV3	Episode: "Culture Shock"
2006	Badai Pesona Ringgit		TV1	Guest actor
2008	Impak Maksima the Series	Shikin	TV3	
2008	Sari Maya	Sari	TV9	
2008	KL Menjerit The Series	Mira	Astro Ria	
2008	Laila Majnun	Laila	TV3	
2009	Gerak Khas (Season 11)	Izan	TV2	Episode: "Bully's Feet"
2009	Cinta Untuk Ain	Ain	TV3	
2009	Sari Maya 2	Sari	TV9	
2009	Dari Mata Arisa	Azarina	TV2	
2010	Na O Mei	Camelia	TV3	
2010	Ahmad Durrah	Fatanah	TV3	
2011	Mistik Alam Hitam		Astro Ria & Astro Prima	
2011	Tanah Kubur (Season 1)	Dila	Astro Oasis	Episode: "Fighting the Force"
2011	Dewa Cintaku	Ona	TV3	
2011	Tihany	Tihany	TV9	
2011	Laila Manja	Azie	TV3	
2012	Friday I'm in Love	Elly	TV9	
2012	Pelangi Kasih	Sofea	TV3	
2012	7 Ramadan	Sufiah (Young)	TV3	
2012	Julia	Julia	TV3	
2013	Janji Shirah	Shirah	TV3	
2013	Udin Glamor Balik Kampung	Zakiyya	TV2	
2013	Teduhan Kasih	Ayu	TV3	
2013	Jodoh Itu Milik Kita	Alya	Astro Mustika HD	
2013	Sangkar	Yasmin	TV9	
2013	Dia Suamiku	Aisyah	Astro Prima	
2013–2014	Ariana Rose	Liyana	TV3	
2014	Masihkah Ada Cinta	Tina	TV3	
2014	Tanah Kubur (Season 10)	Tina	Astro Oasis	Episode: "My Corpse Steps"
2014	Antidot	Teja	TV3	
2015	Bencinta	Nabil's mother	TV3	
2015	Akulah Balqis	Seri	TV3	
2016	Udin Glamor Balik Kampung 2	Zakiyya	TV2	
2016	Sayap Jibril	Aisyah	Astro Oasis	Episode: "Heart"
2017	Dendam Aurora	Aurora	Astro Prima	
2017	Mr. Hijab	Fazira	TV3	
2018	KL Gangster: Underworld	Shameen	Iflix	
2018	Folklore		HBO Asia	Episode: "Toyol"
2019	Spanar Jaya X	Mona	TV3	Guest actor
2019	Kamar Kamariah	Kamariah	TV3	
2019	Iktibar	Fatimah	TV3	Episode: "Victim of Love"
2019–2021	Black	Dr. Aisya	Viu	
2020	KL Gangster Underworld 2	Shameen	Iflix,WeTV	
2020	You Kat...?	Maisarah	Awesome TV	
2021	Covid Oh Covid	Salmiah	TV3	
2021	Diva Popular	Erma Erika	Awesome TV	
2021	Lockdown	Aliya	Astro Ria	
2021	Terlerai Noktah	Zaira	TV3	
2021	Diva Popular 2	Erma Erika	Awesome TV	
2022	Melodi Raya: MELO'DRAMA'DI Raya	Mom Wok	TV3	
2023	Sekali Aku Bahagia	Aireen	TV3	
2023	Alter-Naratif	Mel Isa	Viu	
2024	Lelaki Itu	Sarina	TV3	
2024	Projek: Exit	Zan's mother	Astro Premier	
2024	Hikayat Bawang Putih Bawang Merah	Mum Kundur	Astro Ceria	
2024	Banjir Raya	Leha	Mediacorp Suria	
2025	Dari Rahim Yang Sama	Suraya	TV3	

=== Telefilm ===
Year	Title	Character	TV Channels	Notes
2002	Kem 505	Nonis	VCD	First telefilm
2003	Meraung	Ayu	VCD	
2003	Satria Maya		VCD	
2004	Cinta Kinabalu	Anne	VCD	
2008	Bahang Ravina	Ravina	Astro Prima	Housekeeper
2008	Rencong	Nisa	TV2	
2009	Bisikan Azazil	Kid/ Wawa	Astro Ria	
2009	Hantu Raya		Astro Ria	
2009	Alahai Cucu Atuk	Milah	Astro Prima	
2010	Emily	Emily	TV3	
2011	Panggilan Ilahi		Astro Prima	
2011	Takbur Seorang Isteri	Sheena	TV9	
2011	Jangan Dilukai Hatinya		Astro Oasis	
2012	Mahar Untukmu	Aisyah	TV3	
2012	Kasih Bumi	Kasih	TV9	
2012	Rebah Taubat	Wati	TV3	
2012	Menara Cinta	Nur	TV3	
2013	Balqis	Anis	TV3	
2013	Sebenarnya	Airis	TV3	
2013	Cinta Gadis Igal-Igal	Mona	TV2	
2014	Hanya Di Atas Kertas	Elle	TV3	
2014	Anak Aku Bukan Milik Aku	Maya	TV3	
2014	Saloma Bahagian 1: Mencuri Guruh	Saloma	Astro First Eksklusif	
2014	Saloma Bahagian 2: Pandang Kaseh	Saloma	Astro First Eksklusif	
2015	Rose Emilia	Rose	TV9	
2015	Olong	Olong	TV3	
2016	Budak Dari Tak Bai	Kisya	Astro Ria	
2016	Kulit	Chempaka	Astro Citra	
2016	Batu Nisan Ibu	Ana	TV3	
2016	Ketupat Terakhir	Dira	TV3	
2016	Baju Berkancing Peniti	Liza	TV3	
2016	Tercipta Untukku	Thia	Astro First Eksklusif	
2017	Lukisan Cinta	Natasha	Astro Ria	
2017	Dan... Aku Jatuh Cinta	Indah	Astro Citra	
2018	Malam Ini Aku Menangis	Julia	Astro Ria	
2018	Arafah	Arafah	TV3	
2018	Rama-Rama	Sahira	ntv7	
2019	Sirna	Irma	TV1	
2019	Dia Tak Berdosa	Laila	TV1	
2019	Remuk	Aishah	TV3	
2019	Syawal Untuk Semah	Zulaikha	TV3	
2020	Jihad Ramadan	Juita	TV3	
2021	Jeti	Zaiton	TV3	
2021	Aku Bukan Malaikat	Shuhada	TV1	
2022	Pelampung	Hayati	TV2	
2022	Pak Kodi Diserang Zombie	Aida	TV3	
2023	Hari-Hari Terakhir Seorang Pendosa	Ramona	TV3	
2023	Maaf Terakhir	Midah	TV3	
2024	Jodoh Geng G	Julia	Astro Warna	
2024	Pelangi Yang Hilang	Nora	TV3	
2025	Alibi	Bella	DEGUP	

=== Theater ===
Year	Title	As	Note
2010	Natrah Musical		
2015	Tenggelamnya Kapal Van Der Wijck	Haryati	
2015	Bawang Puteh Bawang Merah	Nenek kebayan	
2019	Ola Bola The Musical: Restaging		
2023	Lantai T. Pinkie	Nyai Sunari	

=== Television ===
Year	Title	As	TV Channel	Notes
2011	Belahan Jiwa	Host	TV1	
2015	Awak Kat Mana ?	Host	Astro Ria	
2016	Apa Rasa ?	Invitation artist	Astro Prima	
2016	Resepi Memikat Suami	Invitation artist	Astro Ria	
2017	Bas Stop	Invitation artist	Astro Warna	Episode: "Viral"
2019	Muzikal Lawak Superstar (Season 1)	Host	Astro Warna	Co-Host with Nabil Ahmad
2020	33th Berita Harian Popular Star Award	Host	TV3	Co-Host with Dato' AC Mizal
2020	The Masked Singer Malaysia (season 1)	Jury	Astro Warna	
2021	Laki Masak, Bini Lucky	Host	Awesome TV	
2021	Award Drama Sangat 2021	Host	TV3	Co-Host with Ain Edruce
2021–2022	Melodi	Host	TV3	
2022	36th Song Champion Award	Host	TV3	Co-Host with Alif Satar
2022	Sepahtu Reunion Live 2022	Nisa	Astro Warna	'Invitation Artist:' Episode "True"
2023	Muzika Ekstravaganza 2023	Host	TV2	Co-Host with Suzairhe Sumari
2023–2024	The Masked Singer Malaysia (season 4)	Jury	Astro Warna	
2024	Masak Sana Sini New York	Host	TV Okey	
2024–2025	Kek & Pastri	Host	TVS	Co-Host with Dr. Ezani Monoto

== Videography ==
=== Music video ===
Year	Song title	Singer	Ref.
2018	"Ragaman"	Faizal Tahir	

== Discography ==
Single
Year	Song title
2009	"X-Ray"

== Awards and nominations ==
Year	Awards	Categories	Nominations	Results
2008	21st Malaysian Film Festival	Best Supporting Actress	Akhirat	Nominated
2009	22nd Malaysian Film Festival	Best Actress	Bohsia: Jangan Pilih Jalan Hitam	Nominated
2009	2009 Screen Awards	Best Actress (Film)	Bohsia: Jangan Pilih Jalan Hitam	Nominated
2012	2012 Screen Awards	Best Actress (Drama)	Mahar Untukmu	Nominated
2012	2012 Screen Awards	Best Actress (Film)	Jalan Kembali: Bohsia 2	Nominated
2013	27th Berita Harian Popular Star Awards	Popular Female TV Actress	Nabila Huda	Won
2013	25th Malaysian Film Festival	Best Supporting Actress	Jalan Kembali: Bohsia 2	Nominated
2014	2014 Screen Awards	Best Supporting Actress (Drama)	Balqis	Won
2016	28th Malaysian Film Festival	Best Actress	Munafik	Won
2016	Kuala Lumpur Film Critics Awards Ceremony	Best Supporting Actress	Munafik	Won
2016	2016 Screen Awards	Best Actress (Film)	Munafik	Nominated
2016	EH Style Awards!	Most Stylish Female Celebrity	Nabila Huda	Nominated
2016	3rd Melodi Awards	Melodi Film Personality	Nabila Huda	Nominated
2017	2017 MeleTOP Era Awards	MeleTOP Film Stars	Munafik	Nominated
2017	Berita Harian Popular Star Awards 2016	Compatible Film Pairing (with Syamsul Yusof)	Munafik	Won
2018	MeleTOP Era Awards 2018	MeleTOP Actor	Dendam Aurora	Nominated
2018	MeleTOP Era Awards 2018	MeleTOP Movie Star	Tombiruo: Penunggu Rimba	Nominated
2018	31th Berita Harian Popular Star Awards	Popular Female TV Actress	Nabila Huda	Nominated
2018	31th Berita Harian Popular Star Awards	Popular Female Movie Actress	Nabila Huda	Nominated
2018	31th Berita Harian Popular Star Awards	Best Movie Couple (with Ajak Shiro)	Nabila Huda	Nominated
2018	31th Berita Harian Popular Star Awards	Best Movie Couple (with Zul Ariffin)	Nabila Huda	Nominated
2019	30th Malaysian Film Festival	Best Supporting Actress	Makrifat Cinta	Won
2019	2019 Screen Awards	Best Actress in a Chain Drama	Kamar Kamariah	Nominated
2019	2019 Screen Awards	Best Actress in a Drama	Dia Tak Berdosa	Won
2022	2022 Seri Angkasa Awards	Best Supporting Actress in a TV Drama	Jeti	Won
2023	35th Berita Harian Popular Star Awards	Popular TV Actress	Nabila Huda	Nominated
2023	35th Berita Harian Popular Star Awards	Popular Film Actress	Nabila Huda	Nominated
2024	33th Malaysian Film Festival	Best Actress	Secret	Nominated
