= Munafik =

2016 supernatural horror film directed by Syamsul Yusof

- Theatrical release poster
- Directed by: Syamsul Yusof
- Screenplay by: Syamsul Yusof
- Story by: Syamsul Yusof
- Produced by: Datuk Yusof Haslam
- Starring: Syamsul Yusof; Nabila Huda; Fizz Fairuz; Sabrina Ali; Pekin Ibrahim; A. Galak; Rahim Razali
- Cinematography: Rahimi Mahidin
- Edited by: Syamsul Yusof
- Production company: Skop Productions
- Distributed by: Skop Productions (Malaysia); MD Pictures (Indonesia)
- Release dates: 25 February 2016 (Malaysia); 7 July 2016 (Indonesia)
- Running time: 98 minutes
- Country: Malaysia
- Language: Malay
- Budget: RM 2 million
- Box office: RM 19 million

Munafik (English: Hypocrite) is a 2016 Malaysian Malay-language supernatural horror film directed by Syamsul Yusof. It was his ninth film as well as his second horror film after Khurafat (2011) and also the first film in a planned Munafik trilogy. It stars Syamsul himself, Fizz Fairuz, Pekin Ibrahim and Nabila Huda. The film depicts Adam, a Muslim medical practitioner who is unable to continue with his job and accept the reality of his wife's death. After he meets Maria, unsettling things start to happen.

The film was released from Malaysia on 25 February 2016, and Indonesia on 7 July 2016. It received positive reviews from film critics and has grossed RM17.04 million nationwide, making Munafik the best-selling Malaysian film of 2016. The film garnered nine nominations at the 2016 Malaysian Film Festival and won five, including Best National Language Film and Best Director. Its sequel, Munafik 2, was released on August 30, 2018. An Indonesian remake film titled Munafik: Melawan Iblis was released on October 1, 2026.

== Plot ==
Adam, a traditional religious medical practitioner, and his wife are the victims of an accident that caused his wife's death. Adam struggles to cope with the loss of his wife, which has shaken his strong faith in religion, and has also stopped helping cure others as he feels incompetent in his job. He eventually meets Maria, who has depression. She later gets possessed by an evil spirit, and Adam has no choice but to help cure her. However, he stumbles upon more revelations linking Maria to the accident that killed his wife. Adam then tries to cure Maria in her house with the help of his friend. Maria's spirit is too strong, and his friend has to stop reciting his prayers to cure her. Maria's spirit laughs and pushes him against the wall. Adam, shocked by what is going on, continues reciting his prayers and then exorcises the spirit out of Maria's body.

Adam still cannot accept the fact that his wife is dead and furiously wants to know who is the killer. Later, Adam's imam, Ali, is found dead. His friend gets the news first and contacts Adam, who is ultimately shocked. His son also calls him to say that his grandfather has gone out of the house. He also mentions that his mother took care of him after his father went out. Adam, furious that the topic of his wife has somehow been brought up again since her death, yells at his son on the phone and slams it down. Later, Adam dreams of digging out his wife's grave to prove his son that his mother is dead.

Adam insists to Azman that all the happenings in the village are connected to Maria's demonic disturbances, with Imam Ali's death and Pak Osman's disappearance being the latest events. He goes home to be confronted by Fazli, who shows hatred towards him. Thereafter Adam receives a call from Zati revealing that Pak Osman has been found. At Maria's place, Zati and Maria claim that they have uncovered who is behind all the disturbances. However, upon going into Pak Osman's room, Adam finds he is still missing and questions Zati and Maria, only to realise that they were apparitions and that he has been tricked into coming by the demonic entity.

At the hospital, Maria gets constantly chased by evil spirits. She tries to run away into the mortuary to find some comfort only for the spirit to continue following her. Adam finds the talisman which Imam Ali was holding before his death, doubting Zati and believing the talisman may be the cause of the recent incidents. He receives a call from Maria saying that she has been holding a dark secret with her and is now willing to share. Maria also says that she cannot stand the torment she is going through any longer.

Adam rushes to Maria, despite his father's call for him to come back as he wishes to talk over the misunderstanding between him and Shah, confusing Adam even more. At the place where Maria is, Adam found her only to be attacked by demonic forces. Maria is seemingly thrown off a storey, fatally wounding her. Adam rushes to her side only to have the hard truth revealed to him: Maria has been the cause of the accident leading to his wife's death, and she was controlled all along by the same demonic force haunting the village, who is Pak Osman. Pak Osman reveals that he has sold himself to the Devil for the riches of the world. Angry at the fact that Adam's faith in God has allowed many others to follow suit, including Maria herself, he sought to use Maria as a puppet to kill Adam in the car accident. A bolt of lightning strikes Pak Osman as he mercilessly attacks Adam.

Adam's dad arrives on the scene to unravel the misunderstandings. He reveals that the reason Shah has been displaying uncanny behaviours to him is that he seemed to think his son, Amir, had been alive all along, when in reality he also died in the same accident that killed Adam's wife. Knowing this final truth, Adam runs away in sadness, asking help from God to grant him the strength to live and ease him of the hardships he has gone through.

== Cast ==
- Syamsul Yusof as Ustaz Adam, a Muslim medical practitioner who is unable to continue with his job and accept the fact of his wife's death.
- Nabila Huda as Maria, a young girl who believes in demons and is later possessed by them.
- Sabrina Ali as Zeti, Maria's stepmother after her biological mother died. She was uneasy with her stepdaughter's attitude.
- Zarina Zainordin as Zulaikha, Ustaz Adam's wife who killed in a car accident.
- Ruzlan Abdullah as Shah, a grave digger.
- A. Galak as Imam Ali, a Muslim preacher.
- Rahim Razali as Rahim, Adam's father.
- Razib Salimin as Pak Osman, Maria's father and Zeti's husband.
- Fizz Fairuz as Azman, Adam's friend. He gives advice to Adam.
- Pekin Ibrahim as Fazli, Maria's boyfriend who always disturbed Maria.

== Production ==
Munafik was directed by Syamsul Yusof who previously directed Evolusi KL Drift (2008), Khurafat: Perjanjian Syaitan and Aku Bukan Tomboy (2011). It was his ninth film and second horror film as well as his first in 3 years after taking a long sabbatical from his directorial career, following his 2013 film, KL Gangster 2 being leaked on the internet prior to its theatrical release. According to Syamsul, he took two months to write the script and conducted a five months of research, including attending sermons from religious experts. In addition, he also took appropriate precaution on the usage of holy Koran verses in order to fight the unnatural forces causing the disturbances. According to him, no film like Munafik has ever been produced in Malaysia. He also had the chance to see how a Muslim medical practitioner treats a patient. Syamsul said it happened to one of his nephews and that he had take him to see an Ustadz.

Nabila Huda, who previously worked under Syamsul for the 2009 film Bohsia: Jangan Pilih Jalan Hitam and its 2012 sequel, Jalan Kembali: Bohsia 2 was cast as Maria, a young girl was disturbed by demons. Sabrina Ali, who previously starred in the 2011 film Khurafat, also directed by her cousin, Syamsul, was cast as Zeti. Other cast members include Datuk Rahim Razali, A. Galak, Pekin Ibrahim, Fizz Fairuz, and Zarina Zainoordin. Principal photography on the film took more than 45 days: it began on March 12, 2015, in Kuala Lumpur, Klang Valley and Janda Baik, Pahang and concluded on April 25, 2015.

== Release ==
Munafik was released in Malaysia, Singapore, and Brunei cinemas on 25 February 2016 to commercial and critical success. In Indonesia, it was screened in 30 cinemas throughout the country and garnered over 15,000 viewers within five days. During the screening, certain audience members claimed that the spell used in the film was a real spell. Syamsul, however, denied the allegations and said that it was merely fictitious.

== Reception ==
=== Box-office ===
After four days of screening, the movie managed to collect RM2.3 million before increased to RM3 million on the fifth day. The proceeds increased to RM4.3 million after a week of screening. The gross increased to RM8.5 million after eleven days. The proceeds rose to RM11 million after two weeks. Entering the eighteenth day, the collection reached RM12.97 million. The movie gross was increased to RM17 million on day twenty-six with total of RM17.04 million in its final theatrical run. The film also has successfully collected RM2 million in Singapore.

=== Critical response ===
Munafik receives mixed reviews. It Caught My Eyes gave a positive review for this movie, writing: "At its heart, though, Munafik still is a horror story. A very good one at that. It didn’t relied on jump scares and apparitions but when it did, it did so with style at appropriate times. It also made full use of the gloomy and grim atmosphere, even if at times you kind of wonder how in the hell does these people survive at such dimly lit environment." Bobby Batara writing for All Film Magazine gave it four out of five stars, praising the film as "a Malaysian film with the horror films of the Indonesian era of '70 -80s. Packed with a strong atmosphere of sharia ideology." In a positive review for Detik Hot, Masyaril Ahmad said that Munafik has a horrific charm compared to the horror films with the theme of the eviction of the devil; he described the horror and religious affiliation in Munafik to inspire new spirits in the strong Malay soul.

== Music ==
The film's official soundtrack, entitled "Kalah Dalam Menang", was performed by Mawi and Syamsul Yusof and released on February 26, 2016. Its music video, directed by Syafiq Yusof, was released on February 12, 2016, and was available for digital download and streaming on iTunes and Spotify.

== Accolades ==
Munafik received 9 nominations at the 28th Malaysian Film Festival, winning 5 including Best National Language Film. Together with Pekin Ibrahim’s directorial debut, Mat Moto, Ghaz Abu Bakar’s Polis Evo and seven other films, it was nominated for the Best Film category. Nabila Huda won Best Actress, while Polis Evo took Best Cinematography and Chiu Keng Guan’s Ola Bola won Best Original Music Score, in which Munafik was nominated. Also in 2016, Munafik received two nominations at the 2016 KL Film Critics' Council Awards, winning one.

At the 2016 Anugerah Skrin, the film received 7 nominations, winning one, namely Best Director for Syamsul Yusof. Tunku Mona Riza’s Redha won the Best Film category. For the Best Screenplay, in which Syamsul was nominated, Wan Hasliza Zainuddin won the category for her 2015 film, Love Supermoon. In 2017, Munafik won the MeleTOP Film while Syamsul and Nabila was nominated for MeleTOP Film Stars, however, Fasha Sandha won the category. At the 2017 Bintang Popular Berita Harian Awards, Syamsul and Nabila won the Best Chemistry on Film category.

Award	Category	Recipient	Result
28th Malaysia Film Festival	Best Film	Datuk Yusof Haslam	Nominated
28th Malaysia Film Festival	Best National Language Film	Datuk Yusof Haslam	Won
28th Malaysia Film Festival	Best Director	Syamsul Yusof	Won
28th Malaysia Film Festival	Best Editing	Syamsul Yusof	Won
28th Malaysia Film Festival	Best Original Music Score	Syamsul Yusof	Nominated
28th Malaysia Film Festival	Best Original Theme Song	Syamsul Yusof	Nominated
28th Malaysia Film Festival	Best Actress	Nabila Huda	Won
28th Malaysia Film Festival	Best Sound Editing	Imaginex Studios	Won
28th Malaysia Film Festival	Best Cinematography	Rahimi Maidin	Nominated
28th Malaysia Film Festival	Best Special Visual Effect	Viper Studios	Nominated
2016 KL Film Critics' Council Awards	Best Supporting Actress	Nabila Huda	Won
2016 KL Film Critics' Council Awards	Best Cinematography	Rahim Maidin	Nominated
2016 Anugerah Skrin	Best Film	Skop Production	Nominated
2016 Anugerah Skrin	Best Director (Film)	Syamsul Yusof	Won
2016 Anugerah Skrin	Best Screenplay	Syamsul Yusof	Nominated
2016 Anugerah Skrin	Best Actor (Film)	Syamsul Yusof	Nominated
2016 Anugerah Skrin	Best Actress (Film)	Nabila Huda	Nominated
2016 Anugerah Skrin	Best Supporting Actor (Film)	Dato' Rahim Razali	Nominated
2016 Anugerah Skrin	Best Supporting Actress (Film)	Sabrina Ali	Nominated
2017 MeleTOP Era Awards	MeleTOP Film	Munafik	Won
2017 MeleTOP Era Awards	MeleTOP Film Stars	Syamsul Yusof	Nominated
2017 MeleTOP Era Awards	MeleTOP Film Stars	Nabila Huda	Nominated
2017 Bintang Popular Berita Harian Awards	Popular Film Actor	Syamsul Yusof	Nominated
2017 Bintang Popular Berita Harian Awards	Best Chemistry on Film	Syamsul Yusof & Nabila Huda	Won

== Sequels ==
=== Munafik 2 ===
With the box office success of Munafik, Syamsul Yusof and Skop Production announce their intention to film its sequel. Pre-production began and filming began in late 2016, with Syamsul reprising his role as Ustaz Adam. It was confirmed in March 2017 that Maya Karin would be the part of cast members, along with Mawi and Nasir Bilal Khan. Principal photography began on March 20, 2017, and took place in Kuala Lumpur and Klang Valley, and took 72 days to complete and the filming wrapped on May 30, 2017. Syamsul announced in July 2018 that the sequel, Munafik 2 would be released on August 30.

=== Munafik 3 ===
On September 4, 2018, the third film was officially announced, with Syamsul return to direct, writing the screenplay and reprised his role. Syamsul reportedly said he wanted to make Munafik as a media franchise. He said in an interview with Utusan Malaysia: "The script for the third Munafik film has yet to be completed but I have a plot in mind. I’ve always had plans to make Munafik a trilogy since the first film in 2016,". He confirms that the third sequel, Munafik 3 will began filming in 2019. However, as of 2020, the anticipated movie did not materialized in the midst of COVID-19 pandemic.

== See also ==
- List of Islamic films
