= Jalan Kembali: Bohsia 2 =

2012 film by Syamsul Yusof

- Film poster
- Directed by: Syamsul Yusof
- Written by: Syamsul Yusof; Rizal Ashraff
- Produced by: Dato' Yusof Haslam; Tengku Iesta Tengku Alaudin (executive)
- Starring: Syamsul Yusof; Salina Saibi; Nabila Huda; Zizan Razak; Soffi Jikan
- Edited by: Hisham Jupri; Syamsul Yusof
- Music by: James Baum
- Production companies: Grand Brilliance; Skop Productions
- Release date: 7 June 2012 (Malaysia)
- Running time: 97 minutes
- Country: Malaysia
- Language: Malay
- Budget: MYR 1.5 million
- Box office: MYR 4.98 million

Jalan Kembali: Bohsia 2 (English: Way Back: Prostitute 2) is a 2012 Malaysian Malay-language action thriller film directed by and starring Syamsul Yusof, Salina Saibi, Nabila Huda, Zizan Razak and Soffi Jikan. It is the sequel to Bohsia: Jangan Pilih Jalan Hitam.

== Synopsis ==
The film Jalan Kembali Bohsia 2 tells about a girl named Amy, an ex-bohsia who has repented and does not want to repeat her black history by setting foot in a rehabilitation center while Tasya, a former enemy, is drifting further and further with illegal symptoms and her behavior is strictly controlled by her boyfriend Keting. Like Amy, Muz has also repented and no longer wants to wallow in the once wasted life, but Muz and Ijan always try to win in every motor race that is held. However, Amy's decision to leave the rehabilitation center is golden opportunity for Keting to divert Amy to the black road. However, with the help of Muz and Ejan, Amy and Tasha find a way to destroy Keting's desire to destroy more girls - weak religious girls.

== Cast ==
=== Main characters ===
- Syamsul Yusof as Muz
- Salina Saibi as Amy
- Nabila Huda as Tasha
- Zizan Razak as Ejan
- Soffi Jikan as Keting

=== Supporting Characters ===
- Harun Salim Bachik as Shaman
- Hetty Sarlene as Ati
- Mak Jah as Rocky
- Serina Redzuawan as Nora
- Kazar Saisi as Abu
- Delimawati as Aunt Tasha
- Angeline Tan as Tauke
- Rose Iskandar as Ustazah
