= Evolusi KL Drift =

2008 action film by Syamsul Yusof

- Theatrical release poster
- Directed by: Syamsul Yusof
- Produced by: Yusof Haslam
- Starring: Syamsul Yusof; Aaron Aziz; Farid Kamil; Fasha Sandha; Diana Danielle
- Music by: James Baum
- Production companies: Skop Productions; Grand Brilliance
- Release date: 3 April 2008 (Malaysia)
- Running time: 95 minutes
- Country: Malaysia
- Language: Bahasa Malaysia
- Budget: MYR 1.63 million ($504,887)
- Box office: MYR 3,901,000 ($1,211,087)

Evolusi KL Drift (English: KL Drift Evolution) is a 2008 Malaysian Malay-language action thriller film directed by Malaysian actor, Syamsul Yusof in his directorial debut, influenced by The Fast and the Furious: Tokyo Drift. The film was released in Malaysia on 3 April 2008. A sequel, Evolusi KL Drift 2, was released in March 2010. The film was shot in various locations all over Malaysia, including Johor Bahru, Bukit Tinggi and Putrajaya.

== Plot ==
The film tells the story of Zack (Syamsul Yusof) and Sham (Farid Kamil), two close friends who share a passion for drift racing. Though the sport is popular with men, Zack's girlfriend (Fasha Sandha) took up the sport and became competitive in it. Zack is an elite racer who runs a workshop while Sham is more down to earth and always has problems with his racing car. Zack is unhappy with drug pushers selling on his racing patch, but Fasha (who is a former user) is friendly with some of them which leads to a confrontation between her and Zack. The pushers are sent to their boss Joe (Aaron Aziz), also a drift racer who uses race meets to sell his product.

A rift continues to grow between Zack and Fasha. Sham becomes a middleman between the two, but ends up also having feelings for her. Zack wins a challenge against Joe but falls out with Sham, despite the latter's numerous apologies and attempts to distance himself from Fasha. Zack and Fasha also confront each other but solve nothing, with Fasha conflicted over her dwindling feelings for Zack and her growing attraction to Sham.

Joe's gang is not happy with the result and murders one of Zack and Sham's friends/mechanics. Zack angrily walks into the club Joe uses as a front but is almost killed by the gang. He is saved by Sham (and another friend called Muz) but does not acknowledge or thank Sham. Muz convinces Zack that the police should be left to deal with Joe, before someone else dies. The police raid the club and arrest many gang members including Joe's henchman Karl, though Joe is not caught.

Sham meets Fasha to clear the air, stating that he is unwilling to lose his brotherly friendship with Zack, and that he wants Fasha to stop contacting him altogether. Zack arrives and totally misreads the situation, forcing Fasha to follow him home. Joe arrives in his racing car and attempts to ram Zack and Fasha. They are saved by Sham, who pushes them out of the way at the cost of great injuries. Zack chases Joe down, resulting in Joe crashing head on into a truck and his car flipping over.

Things finish with Sham in hospital, presumably in a coma. Zack is chastised by his team members and a sobbing Fasha, though he and Fasha sit by Sham's bedside.

== Cast ==
=== Main characters ===
- Syamsul Yusof as Zack
- Aaron Aziz as Joe
- Farid Kamil as Sham
- Fasha Sandha as Fasha
- Diana Danielle as Sara

=== Supporting Characters ===
- Iqram Dinzly as Karl
- Buzen Hashim as Zul
- Rizal Ashraf as Muz
- Xy as Zero
- Hetty Sarlene as Vee
- Nurhuda Mohd Ali as Sazzi
- Mohd Shahril as jj

== Sequel ==
A sequel titled Evolusi KL Drift 2 was released on 25 March 2010 with the same budget of 2.5 million ($828,225). Although, the film generated almost $4 million less than its predecessor.

== Television series ==
In Summer 2012 it was announced that a television show spin off the original series was in production titled Evolusi KL Drift: The Series. On 7 September 2012, a trailer for the series was uploaded onto YouTube which also stating the release date. It officially aired on 4 October 2012 on RTM TV2. The show featured recurring actors from the films with new additions to the cast.

== Awards and nominations ==
(Won)

- 21st Malaysian Film Festival (2008) Jury Special Award: The effectiveness of action stunts on screen
- 21st Malaysian Film Festival (2008) Best Cinematography

(Nominated)

- 21st Malaysian Film Festival (2008) Best Original Theme Song
- 21st Malaysian Film Festival (2008) Best Sound Effect
- 21st Malaysian Film Festival (2008) Best Poster
- 21st Malaysian Film Festival (2008) Most Promising Actor
- 21st Malaysian Film Festival (2008) Most Promising Director
