= Evolusi KL Drift 2 =

2010 film by Syamsul Yusof

- Theatrical poster
- Directed by: Syamsul Yusof
- Produced by: Yusof Haslam; Ahmad Puad Onah
- Starring: Syamsul Yusof; Aaron Aziz; Farid Kamil; Shaheizy Sam; Scha Alyahya; Remy Ishak
- Music by: James Baum
- Production companies: Skop Productions; Grand Brilliance
- Distributed by: Primeworks Studios
- Release date: 25 March 2010
- Running time: 90 minutes
- Country: Malaysia
- Languages: Malay; Cantonese
- Budget: MYR 2.5 million
- Box office: MYR 6 million

Evolusi KL Drift 2 (English: KL Drift Evolution 2) is a 2010 Malaysian Malay-language action thriller film directed by and starring Syamsul Yusof, Aaron Aziz, Farid Kamil, Shaheizy Sam, Scha Alyahya and Remy Ishak. It is the sequel to the 2008 film Evolusi KL Drift. The film was released in Malaysia, Singapore and Brunei on 25 March 2010.

== Plot ==
Racing life between Zack (Syamsul Yusof) and Sham (Farid Kamil) has not ended yet. Zack, who used to be an illegal racer is currently a professional drifter. After the accident, Sham no longer drifts due to his broken leg and has to walk using the aid of crutches. Soon a female professional drifter called Aleeya (Scha Alyahya) appears. Joe (Aaron Aziz), who managed to escape unhurt from the accident, wants revenge on Zack. Joe's assistant Ery (Shaheizy Sam) also wants revenge on Zack because he caused his best friend, Karl (played by Iqram Dinzly in the prequel) to get locked up in jail. Joe wants to control the whole drug business syndicate in KL, and ASP Kamal (Remy Ishak) suspects him for the crimes that involved deaths. What is the outcome of their new race this time? Will they be able to reach the finish line without complication?

== Cast ==
=== Main characters ===
- Syamsul Yusof as Zack
- Farid Kamil as Sham
- Scha Alyahya as Aleya
- Aaron Aziz as Joe
- Shaheizy Sam as Ery
- Remy Ishak as ASP Kamal

=== Supporting Characters ===
- Buzen Hashim as Zul
- Hetty Sarlene as Vee
- Rizal Ashraf as Muz
- Adam Corrie as Alex
- Zul Ariffin as ASP Zam
- Aidil Aziz as Bad Guy
