= Faezah Elai =

Malaysian actress

- فائزة الاي
- Born: Noor Faezah Md Elai; August 16, 1982 (age 43); Gelugor, Penang, Malaysia
- Occupations: Actress, model and TV host
- Years active: 2006 - present
- Spouse: Heykal Hanifah
- Children: 3

Noor Faezah Md Elai (better known by the name Faezah Elai) is a Malaysian actress.

== Early life ==
She is of Punjabi and Thai people descent. She came from Gelugor, Penang, and was born on August 16, 1982. She is also a former flight attendant of the Malaysian Aviation System (MAS).

== Career ==
She started her early career as a model and joined Dewi Remaja 2005/2006, where Scha Alyahya won the competition for that edition. Her first appearance in the film was through the film “Otai” directed by Abdul Razak Mohaideen in 2007. She later starred in the television drama series “Sutera Maya” which was broadcast on TV3 playing the role of Maya Sofea. She started her acting work with the drama on the channel Astro Ria, Cinta dan Keadilsm.

== Filmography ==
=== Film ===
Otai (2007) as Mawar Anak Mamak Menantu Mami (2010) Cun! (2011) as Kuntom/Tom Senjakala (2011) as Isabella Tolong Awek Aku Pontianak (2011) Jidin Sengal (2012) as Ella Sunti Mantera The Movie (2012) Adik Manja Returns (2012) as Bib KL Zombi (2013) as Sofea Tanda Putera (2013) as Rahah Mohamed Noah

=== Telefilem ===
Dalca Mami Georgetown (2009) Cinta Si Kasar Lembut (2011) Ijam Non Yankee (2012) Abah Tak Balik Malam Raya (2013) Di Bawah Satu Langit (2013) Dia Yang Terpilih (2013) as Mak Ngah Miah Oh Miah Anugerah Mimi Di Mana Kan Ku cari Ganti Pelita Tanpa Sumbu (2013) Habibah VS Baby (2014) Bila Tiba Saatnya (2016) Sinar Ramadan Untuk Amanda (2019)

=== Drama ===
Cinta Dan Keadilan Enigma (2008) Sutera Maya (2008) sebagai Maya Sofea Asmara as Zaliya Cempaka Berbunga Pemanduku Jutawan (2009) Hartamas (2009) La Dolce Amira (2009) as Amira Cinta Sempurna (2009) Gerak Khas (Musim 11) - episode: "Sindiket" Sayang Cendana (2010) as Gina Dendam Kesuma (2010) Asmara 2 (2011) as Zaliya / Suhana Jiwa & Lara (2011) as Marini Memberku Hawa (Musim 1) (2012) as Hawa Andai Kutahu (2012) as Shima/Shariza 7 Suami (2014) as herself Kifarah: Di Angin Lalu (2014) as Zareen Kifarah 2: Seri Muka (2014) as Nadia Wadi (2015) as Cikgu Murni Kifarah Mistik: Malam Jumaat (2015) Nana Narita (2011) Cerita Ramadan Hazim (2017) Cinta Fatamorgana (2018) as Wahidah Setelah Cinta Itu Pergi (2019) as Zaidah Rumah Siti Khadijah (2019) as Amira
