= Prince of the City (2012 film) =

Malaysian film by Roslan Hussin

- Directed by: Roslan Hussin
- Written by: Calvin Wong
- Produced by: Julian Cheah; Naeim Ghalili
- Starring: Julian Cheah; Michael Madsen; Aaron Aziz; Jehan Miskin
- Cinematography: Mike Muschamp
- Edited by: Denear Peng-Khoon Tan
- Music by: Shamsul Cairel; Peng-Chuang Fong; Fadzly Razman
- Production company: Axis Line Entertainment
- Release date: 27 December 2012 (Malaysia)
- Country: Malaysia
- Language: English

Prince of the City is a 2012 Malaysian action-crime thriller film directed by Roslan Hussin and written by Calvin Wong.

== Synopsis ==
Prince Amara (Julian Cheah), the adopted son of a Malaysian billionaire, is framed for murder by his full-blooded brother and exiled from the country. Amara hires a gangster and a killer bodyguard to take back what belongs to him.

== Cast ==
- Julian Cheah as Prince Amara
- Michael Madsen as Ben Carlton
- Aaron Aziz as Iskandar Yaakob
- Jehan Miskin as Putra Sibuyan
- Tara Wallace as Adele Hayes
- Nabihan Yaacob as Nora Hamid
- Wan Hanafi Su as Jaggoi Sibuyan
- Himanshu Bhatt as Abdul Hussain
- Kenji Sawahi as Chin Yew
- Yank Kassim as Muzaffar Abidin
- Rizal Halim as Adnan Malik
- James Jian Xian Chung as Gangster Cina
