= Soffi Jikan =

Malaysian actor and director (born 1970)

- صوفي جيكان
- Born: Mohammad Shoffi bin Jikan; 13 November 1970 (age 55); Kuala Terengganu, Terengganu, Malaysia
- Education: Sijil Pelajaran Malaysia (SPM)
- Occupations: Actor, singer, writer, director
- Years active: 2001–present
- Spouse: Izzaty Isma Ibrahim
- Children: 3
- Relatives: Shaiful Jikan (brother)

Mohammad Shoffi bin Jikan (born 13 November 1970) is a Malaysian actor, singer, writer and director.

== Personal life ==
On 13 May 2019, Sofi was ordered to defend himself by Mahkamah Petaling Jaya on charges of using marijuana.

== Filmography ==
=== Film ===
Year	Title	Role	Notes
2003	Paloh	Harun	Debut film appearances
2003	Gedebe		
2004	Malaikat di Jendela		Short film
2004	Pontianak Harum Sundal Malam	Amang	
2005	Rock	Zul Kapan	
2006	Man Laksa	Fendi Hafifi	
2006	Cinta	Joe	
2006	Bilut	Ngah Busu	
2007	Chermin	Zakaria	
2007	Zombi Kampung Pisang	Sofi	
2008	Kala Malam Bulan Mengambang	Communist Leader	
2008	Antoofighter: Amukan Drakulat!	Admiral Bajang	
2008	Los dan Faun	Pak Guard Lance Koperal	
2008	Susuk	Guitarist	
2009	Setem	Mat Rempit	
2010	Kapoww	Mi Belit	
2010	Estet	Junna	
2010	Hantu Kak Limah Balik Rumah	Wak Joko	
2010	V3: Samseng Jalanan	—N/a	Also as writer
2011	KL Gangster	Ajib	
2012	Bunohan	Awang Sonar	
2012	Jiwa Taiko	Boss	
2012	Kahwin 5	Cico	
2012	Jalan Kembali: Bohsia 2	Keting	
2013	Rock Oo!	Zul Kapan	
2013	Pecah	Alan	
2013	KL Gangster 2	Ajib	
2013	Kolumpo	Komang	
2013	Tokan	Solihin	
2014	Zombie Kilang Biskut	M. A. Sofi	
2014	Abang Long Fadil	Ajib	
2014	Hantu Nan Sempit	Ribut	
2014	Amir dan Loqman Pergi ke Laut	Big Joe	
2014	Lelaki Harapan Dunia	Wan	
2015	Romeo Kota	DSP Yusri	
2015	Darah Panas	Aloi	
2015	Gangterock Kasi Sengat	Shake	Also as director and writer
2015	Bravo 5	Sidek Tapa	
2016	Radhi Ruby bin Dadu	Radhi	
2016	Rock Bro!	Zul Kapan	
2016	Bo-Peng	Based	
2018	Dukun	Fadzli	
2018	Polis Evo 2	Qalif	
2020	Jodoh Syaitan	Megat	
2022	Tiga Janda Melawan Dunia	Mat Todak	Cameo
2023	Memburu	Bomoh	
2024	The Experts	Himself	Special appearances alongside Michael Ang and Aziz M. Osman
2025	Martabat: Misi Berdarah	Soffi	Special appearances
TBA	The Original Gangster	Api	Post-production
TBA	Khawarij		Pre-production

=== Television series ===
Year	Title	Role	TV channel	Notes
2008	Seri Budi Emas		TV1	
2008	Frontage	Taxi Driver	NTV7	Episode: "Taxi Driver"
2009	Tok Ketua	—N/a	Astro Warna	As director
2011	Gerak Khas (Season 13)		TV2	Episode: "Integriti"
2012	Tanah Kubur (Season 3)	Syuib	Astro Oasis	Episode: "Lelaki Emas"
2013	Tanah Kubur (Season 8)	Kamal	Astro Oasis	Episode: "Lorongan Ajal"
2014	Marco Polo (Season 1)	Milo Boy	Netflix	2 episodes
2014	Jalan Kembali	Keting	TV2	
2015	Sketso (Season 1)		Astro Warna	
2016	Tanah Kubur (Season 15)	Shuib	Astro Oasis	Episode: "Kakitangan Judi"
2019	Cerita Dalam Kain	Halim	Astro Prima	Episode: "Aku Bukan Hamba"
2020	Kampung Pisang Bersiri-siri	Pak Salam Joko	Astro Citra	
2021	Annyeonghaseyo Cikgu Maryam		Astro Warna	
2021	Ganjil	David	Viu	
2022	Reen Putus Cinta		Awesome TV	
2023	Special Force: Anarchy	Cerpelai	Disney+ Hotstar	

=== Telemovie ===
Year	Title	Role	TV channel
2001	Mat Nor Kushairi & The Velvet Boys	Nayan	ntv7
2003	Champion	Man Kok	VCD
2003	Neon	Friend Ringgo II	VCD
2011	7 Lagu	Effendi	Astro Citra
2012	Al-Ikhlas	Zaki	TV3
2012	Taubat Seorang Samseng	Rokiman	Astro Oasis
2012	Sebelum Kiamat		TV3
2012	7 Hari Di Neraka	Saufi	TV9
2012	Ampun Untukmu		TV9
2013	Arman	Hamdan	TV3
2014	7 Jam		TV9
2014	Warkah Syurga	Shark	Astro Prima
2015	Rekah	Da' Ron	TV2
2016	Dari Asar Ke Isyak	Badron	TV2
2017	Bisik Pada Allah	Leman	Astro Citra
2017	Semerah Darah	Ibrahim	Astro Citra
2018	Kitab Sijjin	Toho	Astro Citra
2021	Tanah Kubur: Hati Hitam	Taza	Astro Citra

=== Television ===
Year	Program	Role	TV channel
2016	Gempak Superstar	Student	Astro Ria

== Discography ==
Single
Year	Title
2020	"Madu"
