= Syamsul Yusof =

Malaysian actor, film director, rapper and singer (born 1984)

- شمس اليوسف
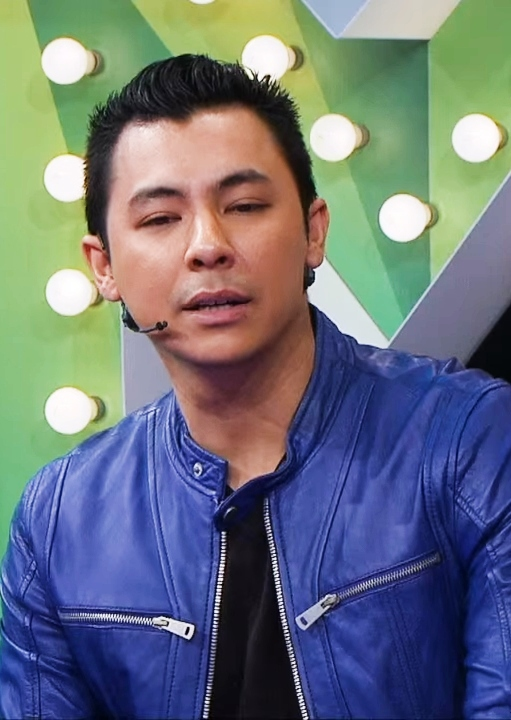
- Syamsul interviewed in MeleTOP in 2016.
- Born: Mohd Syamsul bin Mohd Yusof; 21 May 1984 (age 42); Kuala Lumpur, Malaysia
- Occupations: Actor; film director; writer; producer; rapper; singer
- Years active: 1998–present
- Spouses: Puteri Sarah Liyana (m. 2014; div. 2023) Ira Kazar (m. 2023; div. 2024)
- Children: 2
- Parents: Datuk Yusof Haslam (father); Datin Fatimah Ismail (mother)
- Relatives: Syafiq Yusof (brother); Faizal Yusof (half-brother); Rizal Ashreff (cousin); Sabrina Ali (cousin)
- Awards: Best Director (FFM)
- Musical career
- Genres: Hip hop; pop; nasheed
- Instrument: Vocals
- Years active: 2012–present

Mohd Syamsul Mohd Yusof (born 21 May 1984) is a Malaysian actor, film director, writer, producer, rapper and singer. He is the son of producer and director Yusof Haslam. He is the youngest director to win the Malaysian Film Festival for Best Director award, doing so at the age of 25.

Having won best director awards six times ever since at the Malaysian Film Festival and Anugerah Skrin, and was named Best Director at the 57th Asia Pacific Film Festival in Cambodia for his work in the horror/religious movie Munafik. In 2018, its sequel, Munafik 2, set a record as the highest grossing Malaysian film, which it held until it was surpassed by his 2022 epic war film Mat Kilau.

== Early life ==
Syamsul Yusof was born on 21 May 1984 and grew up in Kuala Lumpur. He is the son of famed director; Yusof Haslam. His brother, Syafiq Yusof is a well-known film director. His cousins, Rizal Ashreff and Sabrina Ali and half-brother, Faizal Yusof are also actors and director TV drama. Syafiq and Faizal themselves also have their other careers as film directors. He studied at the Malaysia Institute of Integrative Media (MIIM) or also known as Academy TV3 where he took a diploma in Film, TV Broadcasting and Journalism.

== Career ==
From 2003 to 2007, Syamsul Yusof started to direct and acted in many TV series for RTM and TV3 such as Gerak Khas, Sembilu Kasih, Air Mata Maria and Tragedi Oktober. In 2007, he direct his first feature film, Evolusi KL Drift, co-written by him and his cousin Rizal Ashreff was initially rejected by his father for further redrafting. After the revision, his first film project was finally approved alongside a budget of RM 1.35 million. Despite his lack of directing experience and the immense pressure of keeping reputation of his family, Evolusi KL Drift was well-received upon its release on 3 April 2008. The film's success paved the way for several other directorial endeavours.

After the success of his directorial debut; his sophomore film Bohsia: Jangan Pilih Jalan Hitam, which had gained unwanted publicity due to the film title's issues with the vulgar language used and certain copyright issues. but he managed to pull through. The film managed to become successful despite the controversy. He continued to direct the sequel to Evolusi KL Drift which released on 25 March 2010. The film was a critical and box-office success, with Syamsul bagging the Best Director award at the 23rd Malaysia Film Festival.

In 2011, he directed his first horror film Khurafat: Perjanjian Syaitan starring himself and Liyana Jasmay in lead roles. Released on 13 January 2011, it collected a gross collection of RM 8 million to the surprise of film thespians. Critics gave praise to his first attempt in directing the horror film. He also added his year's roster with KL Gangster, being careful in its production. The film collected a gross of almost RM 12 million, twice what his father achieved through Sembilu II, despite competition from foreign films screening during that time. The movie also won him the 24th Malaysia Film Festival's Best Director award for two years in a row.

He directed Aku Bukan Tomboy, his first comedy film starring Scha Alyahya as Farisha / Eisha. The movie was released on 17 November 2011, later followed by Jalan Kembali: Bohsia 2 based on the sequel to 2009 film and KL Gangster 2. After three years of absence, Syamsul came back with his latest film, Munafik, was released to Malaysian cinemas in February 2016. Ten months later, he starred as mentally-disturbed guy named Aiman in a mystery science fiction film Desolasi, directed by his brother Syafiq Yusof which was released on 8 December 2016. Syamsul appear in biographical romantical film Makrifat Cinta which was released in February 2018.

Syamsul also dabbles in a music. He produced an EP with Anwar Fazal, entitled The Love Legacy back then. The EP contained four songs - "Bidadari", "Apakah Semuanya Itu" (used as the soundtrack for Evolusi KL Drift 2), "Ya Robbi" (soundtrack for Khurafat) and "Hingga Hujung Dunia" (soundtrack for Aku Bukan Tomboy). In 2016, he released a new single which was a collaboration with singer Mawi, "Kalah Dalam Menang". The song was used as the theme song for his latest film, Munafik. He continued his collaboration with Mawi for a later songs, titled "Bukan Propaganda" used as a soundtrack for Desolasi.

In the month of October 2020, Syamsul confirmed on his Instagram account that he is working on a screenplay for Munafik 3, a sequel to the highly successful Munafik 2 and the third entry in the Munafik film series. He later will directed, produced and screenplay his fourth horror film, Khawarij from Astro Shaw and putting the third Munafik film on hold. The film will become the first ever collaboration between them in directing as Syamsul previously appears as Inspector Wahab in 2017 action comedy film Abang Long Fadil 2 co-produced by Astro Shaw. It came few days after he ends principal photography of his gangster film, The Original Gangster.

== Personal life ==
Syamsul married actress Puteri Sarah Liyana Megat Kamaruddin on 8 March 2014. They have two children, Syaikhul Islam (born 2017) and Sumayyah (born 2019). On 16 January 2023, Puteri Sarah went to Syariah Court to annul her marriage with Syamsul due to his second marriage with Ira Kazar, daughter of veteran actor Kazar Saisi, where he secretly wed in Thailand on 6 January 2023. On 5 September 2024, Syamsul divorced Ira Kazar.

== Filmography ==
=== Film ===
Year	Title	Credited as				Role	Notes and awards
Year	Title	Actor	Director	Writer	Producer	Role	Notes and awards
1998	Maria Mariana II	Yes	No	No	No	Bridesmaid	First appearance
2005	Gila-Gila Pengantin Popular	Yes	No	No	No	Ijam	
2008	Evolusi KL Drift	Yes	Yes	Yes	No	Zack	His directing and screenwriting debut: Special Jury Award Malaysia Film Festival 21-Best Stunt Action on Screen
2009	Bohsia: Jangan Pilih Jalan Hitam	Yes	Yes	Yes	No	Muz	Nominated- Best Editing Malaysia Film Festival 22
2010	Evolusi KL Drift 2	Yes	Yes	Yes	No	Zack	Won Best Director - Malaysia Film Festival 23; Won Best Film Editor - Malaysia Film Festival 23; Won Best Screenplay Film - Malaysia Screen Awards 2010; (Nominated) Best Film - Malaysia Screen Awards 2010; (Nominated) Best Director - Malaysia Screen Awards 2010
2011	Khurafat: Perjanjian Syaitan	Yes	Yes	Yes	No	Johan	(Nominated) Best Screenplay - Malaysia Film Festival 24; (Nominated) Best Original Story; (Nominated) Best editing (with Hisham Jupri)
2011	KL Gangster	Yes	Yes	Yes	No	Shark	Won Best Director - Malaysia Film Festival 24; Won Best Editing - Malaysia Film Festival 24; (Nominated) Best Film - Malaysia Screen Awards 2011; (Nominated) Best Director - Malaysia Screen Awards 2011
2011	Aku Bukan Tomboy	Yes	Yes	Yes	No	Burn	
2012	Jalan Kembali: Bohsia 2	Yes	Yes	Yes	No	Muz	
2012	SAM: Saya Amat Mencintaimu	Yes	No	No	No	Jefri	
2013	Gangster Celop	Yes	No	No	No	Adam	
2013	KL Gangster 2	Yes	Yes	Yes	No	Shark	
2013	Oh Mak Kau!	Yes	No	No	No	Lutfan	
2014	Abang Long Fadil	Yes	No	No	No	Shark / Zack / Mus	
2016	Mat Moto	Yes	No	No	No	Mus	Cameo appearance
2016	Munafik	Yes	Yes	Yes	No	Ustaz Adam	Won Best Director - 57th Asia Pacific Film Festival; Won Best Director - Malaysia Film Festival; Won Best Director - Anugerah Skrin 2016; Won Best Film - Malaysia Film Festival; (Nominated) Best Actor - 57th Asia Pacific Film Festival
2016	Desolasi	Yes	No	No	No	Aiman	
2017	Abang Long Fadil 2	Yes	No	No	No	Inspector Wahab	
2018	Makrifat Cinta	Yes	No	No	No	Mahathir	
2018	KL Special Force	Yes	No	No	No	Asyraff	
2018	Munafik 2	Yes	Yes	Yes	Yes	Ustaz Adam	
2022	Mat Kilau	No	Yes	Yes	No	—N/a	Nominated for Best Director - Malaysia Film Festival
TBA	The Original Gangster	Yes	Yes	Yes	Yes	Don	Post-production
TBA	Khawarij	Yes	Yes	Yes	Yes	Adam	Post-production

=== Television series ===
Year	Title	Credited as			Role	TV channel	Notes
Year	Title	Actor	Director	Producer	Role	TV channel	Notes
2005–2007	Sembilu Kasih	Yes	Yes	No	Syamsul	TV3	
2007	Airmata Maria	Yes	Yes	No	Johan	TV3	
2008	Farah Syakira	Yes	No	No	Syamil	TV2	
2009	Cik Ah Cik Nin	Yes	No	No		Astro Prima	
2009	Gerak Khas (Season 11)	Yes	No	No	Syamil	TV2	Episode: "Diburu Along"
2011	Khurafat: The Series	No	No	No	—N/a	Astro Ria	Story
2012	Tanah Kubur (Season 4)	Yes	No	No	Malek	Astro Oasis	Episode: "Bunga Haram"
2012	Ameera	Yes	No	No	Ameer	TV3	
2012–2013	Evolusi KL Drift: The Series	Yes	No	No	Zack	TV2	
2014–2018	Gerak Khas	Yes	Yes	Yes	Supt. Jefri	TV2	Also co-producer
2018	Sejadah Untuk Dia	No	No	No	—	Astro Oasis	Original idea
2021	Ramadani	Yes	No	No	Tuan Rahmat	TV3	
2021–2022	Gerak Khas Undercover	No	No	Yes	—N/a	TV3	As co-producer

=== Telemovie ===
Year	Title	Credited as			Role	TV channel
Year	Title	Actor	Director	Producer	Role	TV channel
2009	Maisara	Yes	No	No	Mus	Astro Prima
2012	Asmara Beijing	Yes	No	No	Rizal	Astro Citra

=== Television ===
Year	Title	Role	TV channel
2016	Gempak Superstar	Himself (Invitation Jury)	Astro Ria
2016	LePaknil	Himself	Astro Ria

== Discography ==
EP

- "The Love Legacy" (2012; with Dr. Anwar Fazal)

Single

- "Kalah Dalam Menang" (2016; featuring Mawi)
- "Bukan Propaganda" (2016; featuring Mawi)
- "Senorita" (2017; featuring Dato' AC Mizal & Shuib Sepahtu)
- "Selamat Tinggal Masa" (2018; featuring Black)
- "Menangislah" (2018; featuring Mawi)
- "Satu Kalimah" (2020)
- "GK Undercover" (2021)

== Awards and nominations ==
Year	Awards	Categories	Nominated works	Outcome
2008	21st Malaysian Film Festival	Effectiveness of Action Adventure on the Silver Screen	Syamsul Yusof, Evolusi KL Drift	Won
2009	22nd Malaysian Film Festival	Best Editing	Syamsul Yusof, Bohsia: Jangan Pilih Jalan Hitam	Nominated
2010	Anugerah Skrin 2010	Best Film Screenplay	Syamsul Yusof, Evolusi KL Drift 2	Won
2010	Anugerah Skrin 2010	Best Film	Evolusi KL Drift 2	Nominated
2010	Anugerah Skrin 2010	Best Director	Evolusi KL Drift 2	Nominated
2010	23rd Malaysian Film Festival	Best Director	Syamsul Yusof, Evolusi KL Drift 2	Won
2010	23rd Malaysian Film Festival	Best Editing	Evolusi KL Drift 2	Won
2010	Anugerah Bintang Popular	Popular Film Actor	Syamsul Yusof	Nominated
2011	24th Malaysian Film Festival	Best Film Screenplay	Syamsul Yusof, Khurafat: Perjanjian Syaitan	Nominated
2011	24th Malaysian Film Festival	Best Original Story	Khurafat: Perjanjian Syaitan	Nominated
2011	24th Malaysian Film Festival	Best Editing	Syamsul Yusof, Hisham Jupri, Khurafat: Perjanjian Syaitan	Nominated
2011	24th Malaysian Film Festival	Best Director	KL Gangster	Won
2011	24th Malaysian Film Festival	Best Editing	Syamsul Yusof, KL Gangster	Won
2011	Anugerah Bintang Popular 2011	Popular Film Actor	Syamsul Yusof	Nominated
2011	Anugerah Skrin 2011	Best Film	KL Gangster	Nominated
2011	Anugerah Skrin 2011	Best Director	KL Gangster	Nominated
2012	Anugerah Blokbuster 2012	Anugerah Tuan Direktor Terhebat	Syamsul Yusof	Won
2012	Anugerah Blokbuster 2012	Anugerah Khas PFM	Syamsul Yusof	Won
2012	Anugerah Blokbuster 2012	Anugerah Filem Takut Terhebat	Khurafat: Perjanjian Syaitan	Won
2012	Anugerah Blokbuster 2012	Anugerah Filem Terhebat	KL Gangster	Won
2013	26th Malaysian Film Festival	Best Director	Syamsul Yusof, KL Gangster 2	Nominated
2013	26th Malaysian Film Festival	Best Cinematography	Syamsul Yusof, Hisham Jupri, KL Gangster 2	Won
2013	26th Malaysian Film Festival	Best Sound	Syamsul Yusof, Hisham Jupri, KL Gangster 2	Won
2016	28th Malaysian Film Festival	Best Director	Syamsul Yusof, Munafik	Nominated
2016	28th Malaysian Film Festival	Best Editing	Syamsul Yusof, Munafik	Nominated
2016	28th Malaysian Film Festival	Best Film	Munafik	Nominated
2022	32nd Malaysian Film Festival	Best Director	Mat Kilau	Nominated
