= Khurafat: Perjanjian Syaitan =

2011 film by Syamsul Yusof

Khurafat
- Directed by: Syamsul Yusof
- Screenplay by: Syamsul Yusof
- Story by: Syamsul Yusof
- Produced by: Datuk Yusof Haslam
- Starring: Syamsul Yusof; Liyana Jasmay; Sabrina Ali
- Cinematography: Omar Ismail
- Edited by: Syamsul Yusof
- Production companies: Skop Productions; Grand Brilliance
- Distributed by: Skop Productions
- Release date: January 13, 2011 (Malaysia)
- Country: Malaysia
- Language: Malay
- Budget: MYR 1.50 million
- Box office: MYR 8.08 million

Khurafat: Perjanjian Syaitan or simply Khurafat (English: Superstition: The Devil's Pact) is a 2011 Malaysian Malay-language supernatural horror film directed by Syamsul Yusof starring Syamsul himself, Liyana Jasmay and Sabrina Ali as a lead role. The film was released on January 13, 2011, and it was his first horror film. The film also produced a TV series, the Khurafat The Series which was aired on 12 July 2011 at Astro Ria.

== Synopsis ==
Tells the forbidden covenant and one of the forms of misappropriation in the Islamic aqidah between humans and demons, something which is deeply prohibited in our holy religion of peace. But man, regardless of the outcome of turning away from Allah, backed by greedy vengeance, was finally drifting with the devil's whisper.

The story begins with Johan, a young man working as a Hospital Assistant. He is married to Aishah. The couple started the marriage alive and happy but unexpectedly the trauma hit the street. They are often disturbed by strange institutions. Various attempts have been made but the disturbance continues. This is terrifying them especially Johan. The presence of an old mystery woman coupled with the emergence of Johan's former girlfriend named Anna who was weird and frightening to add another episode of this couple's trauma.

Anna always interrupts Johan even when Johan is with Aishah. This led to Johan increasingly running. Shortly afterwards, Anna was found dead in suicide. Anna's death was the culmination of strange things that happened in Johan's life. Anna's shadow began to disturb Johan or Aishah. Johan's life is getting depressed. After being caught in a variety of strange events then finally revealed all the mysteries. Johan finally agreed with his past mistakes ... the act of Khurafat practiced now claiming his right and Johan had to pay him for a very high price.

== Cast ==
=== Main characters ===
- Syamsul Yusof as Johan
- Liyana Jasmay as Aishah
- Sabrina Ali as Anna

=== Supporting Characters ===
- Along Eyzendy as Rosman
- Fauziah Nawi as Johan & Ila mom.
- Huda Ali as Ila
- Mariani Ismail as Aunt Rosnah
- Latiff Borgiba as Bomoh
- Salina Saibi as Zura
- A. Galak as Mr. Aziz
- Ruzaidi Abdul Rahman as Imam Kahar
- Shah Iskandar as Shah
- Iffa Marisha sebagai Iffa
- Izzue Islam as Night Club Visitors

== Reception ==
In the four days of the show, the movie Khurafat earned a collection of RM2.5 million, as well as being placed at the top of Malaysian cinema collection charts at the weekend of 13–16 January 2011. The film is still outperforming the national cinema chart in the second week (20-26 January 2011).
