= Aaron Aziz =

Singaporean actor and director (born 1976)

Yang Hormat Dato' Aaron Aziz DIMP
- ارون عزيز
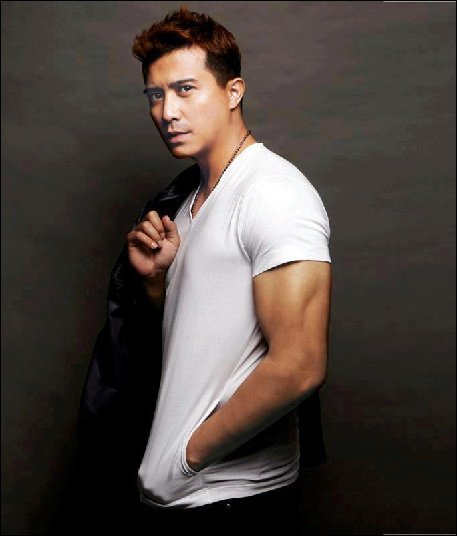
- Aziz in May 2012
- Born: Aaron Mustapha bin Aziz; 23 February 1976 (age 50); Singapore
- Occupations: Actor, director, host, model
- Years active: 2001–present
- Spouse: Diyana Halik (m. 2003)
- Children: 3
- Mother: Juriana Jaafar
- Musical career
- Genre: R&B
- Years active: 2012–present

Yang Hormat Dato' Aaron Mustapha bin Aziz (Jawi: ارون مصطفى بن عزيز; born 23 February 1976) is a Singaporean actor and director.

He started his acting career in Singapore in 2001 through Shahril in Cinta Bollywood (2001–2002), then acting as Bob in Jeritan Sepi (2002) and as Corporal Jamal Salleh in Heartlanders (2002–2005). His Singaporean television portrayals include Zack Ahmad in sitcom Phua Chu Kang Pte Ltd (season 6) and Iqmal in the drama series Cinta Q.

He began acting in more Malaysian shows in 2004 to begin his acting career as an assistant character in the Haryati drama (2004). His acting credits in Malaysia include Emil Emilda, Sadiq & Co, Nora Elena, Evolusi KL Drift: The Series and Kusinero Cinta. His film credits include Evolusi KL Drift (2008), Bohsia: Jangan Pilih Jalan Hitam (2009), Pisau Cukur (2010), KL Gangster (2011), Ombak Rindu (2011) and Lari (2013).

On 16 December 2017, he was awarded the Darjah Kebesaran Mahkota Pahang Yang Dihormati (Darjah Indera Mahkota Pahang) by Sultan Ahmad Shah of Pahang in conjunction with the Sultan's birthday for his contributions to the Malay entertainment industry.

== Honours ==
=== Honours of Malaysia ===
- Pahang
  - Knight Companion of the Order of the Crown of Pahang (DIMP) – Dato' (16 December 2017)

== Filmography ==
=== Film ===
Year	Title	Role	Notes
2008	Evolusi KL Drift	Joe	
2009	Bohsia: Jangan Pilih Jalan Hitam	Azam	
2009	Pisau Cukur	Ari	
2010	Evolusi KL Drift 2	Joe	
2010	2 Alam	Ustaz Ishak	
2011	KL Gangster	Malek	
2011	Ombak Rindu	Hariz	
2011	Datin Ghairah	Zack / Dato' Mahfuz	
2012	Ngorat	Arjuna Kasih aka A.K	
2012	Prince of the City	Iskandar Yaacob	
2012	Shh...Dia Datang	Edd	
2013	Kerat 14	Haziq	
2013	Lari	Khaliff	
2013	Dampak	Idrus	
2013	KL Gangster 2	Malek	
2014	Abang Long Fadil	Malek	
2014	Supersquad The Movie	Laksamana Aaron	Voice only
2014	Tembus	Hari	
2015	Romeo Kota	Koperal Detektif Romi	Also director
2015	Suamiku, Encik Perfect 10!	Zarief Daniel	
2015	Voluptas		
2016	Special Female Force	President	Cantonese film
2017	Kau Yang Satu	Taufik	
2018	Tik Tik Tik	Captain Lee Wei	Indian Tamil film
2018	Operasi X	ASP Redzuan	
2019	Undercover vs Undercover	Top	Cantonese film
2020	Tyickoouns	Tycoon Sobeer	
2021	Selamat Hari X Jadi	Daddy Hani	
2021	Dekatnya Cinta	Adam Mukhriz	
2023	Budak Flat	Boss X	
2023	Sayu Yang Syukur	Qudaim	Also director
2024	The Experts Selamatkan Raya	Farid	Short film
2024	Sheriff: Narko Integriti	Tony Ifrit	
2024	The Experts	Farid	
2025	Banduan	Dali	
2026	5 Bomoh	Rashdan	

=== Television series ===
Year	Title	Role	Notes	Ref
2001–2002	Cinta Bollywood	Shahril		
2001	A War Diary			
2002	Jeritan Sepi	Bob		
2002–2005	Heartlanders	Kopral Jamal Salleh		
2003	Lightyears	Peter Xavier		
2003	Garisan Takdir			
2003	Living With Lydia	The Prince	Special appearance in one episode	
2003	Teater Komedi	Dr. Bujang	Episode 2	
2004	Suspek			
2004	Phua Chu Kang Pte Ltd (Season 6)	Zack Ahmad	Episode: "Citizen Phua"	
2004	Permintaan Aishah			
2004	Missing			
2004	Leftenan Adnan – A Life Story	Adnan Saidi		
2004	Haryati (Season 2)			
2005	My Sassy Neighbour (Season 1)	Abdul	Episode 4	
2005	Sumayyah			
2006	Cinta Q	Iqmal		
2006	Janji Diana	Haikal		
2007	Emil Emilda	Emil		
2007	Police & Thief (Season 4)	Ahmad	Episode 13	
2008	Sadiq & Co	Ariff Sadiq		
2008	Bulan Bertemu Matahari			
2009	Cinta Gila	Malik		
2009	Rahsia Hati	Syamir		
2009	Kasih Tercipta			
2010	Habil & Qabil	Habil Najmi		
2011	Nora Elena	Seth Tan		
2011	Jiwa & Lara	Zaman		
2011	Stanza Cinta	Irfan Ikmal		
2011	Tahajjud Cinta	Iskandar		
2011–2012	Karma	Qayyum		
2012	Metro Skuad (Season 1)	Frankie	Episode: "Dendam"	
2012	Adam dan Hawa	Adam Mukhriz		
2012	Tanah Kubur (Season 4)	Syamsul	Episode: "Ibu Ampunkan Aku"	
2012–2013	Evolusi KL Drift The Series	Dino	Special appearance	
2013	Oh My English! (Season 2)	Cikgu Malik		
2014	Tentang Hati	Zakuan		
2014	Kusinero Cinta	Syed Izmir		
2015	Dan Calonnya Adalah (Season 2)	Aris		
2015	Tuan Anas Mikael	Anas Mikael		
2016	Isteri Tuan Ihsan	Ihsan Iskandar		
2017	Black Belt Kaler Pink	Ash		
2017	My Darling Inspektor Daniel	Inspector Daniel		
2017	Meet the MP (Season 1)	Danial Razali MP	Regular cast	
2019	Meet the MP (Season 2)	Danial Razali MP	Regular cast	
2019	Jodoh-jodoh Annisa	Nizam		
2019	Patah Sayap Bertongkat Paruh	Talhah		
2020	Jalan Sesat Ke Syurga	Hamzah		
2021	Saga	Andy	Aired in Suria on 2015	
2021–2022	Gerak Khas Undercover	Zaki		
2022	Suamiku Lelaki Pendosa	Dean Ilyas		
2022	Takdir Cinta Dhia	Fayyad		
2023	Derhaka Sebuah Cinta	Azmir		
2023	Tanah Kubur (Season 16)	Syamil	Episode: "Cinta Ular, Zalim Kucing"	
2025	Din Tiger	Din Tiger		
2025	Safira (Bukan Nama Sebenar)	Dato' Rahman		

=== Telemovie ===
Year	Title	Role	Notes	Ref
2006	3 Dol	Lokman/Chokmat	Malay Singapore telemovie	
2007	Cahaya Hati	Jeffri		
2009	Cinta Lelong	Azrul		
2010	Cinta Akhbar	Ashraf		
2010	30 Hari Mengenali Cinta	Ari		
2010	Santau Keramat	Najmi		
2011	Kekasih Awal & Akhir	Awal	As director	
2013	Anugerah Dendam Yang Terindah	Azman		
2015	Cinta Paling Agung	Khairi		
2015	Tak Nak Balik Raya	Omar		
2017	Famili Tuan Ihsan	Ihsan Iskandar		
2018	Jodoh Hak Milik Allah	Hans		
2018	Renyai Takbir Raya	Rais		
2020	6 Hari	Ismal		
2020	Mak Cun Anjung Orang Kita			

=== Television ===
Year	Title	Role	Ref
2013–2014	Fear Factor Malaysia	Host	
2013	E! Special: Aaron Aziz	Himself	
2018	Oh My Family!	Himself	
2023	Mic On! Selebriti	Jury	
2023	Nona	Himself	

=== Music video ===
Year	Song Title	Artist
2012	"Untuk Dia"	Siti Saleha, Sleeq & Najwa Latif

== Discography ==
Single
Year	Song Title	Artist
2012	"Salam Semua"	Dato' Aaron Aziz & Sleeq

== Awards and nominations ==
Year	Award	Category	Nominated work	Result	Ref
2002	Pesta Perdana	Best Male Actor in Supporting Role	Cinta Bollywood	Won	
2003	Pesta Perdana	Most Popular Artiste	Garisan Takdir	Won	
2004	Pesta Perdana	Most Popular Artiste – Top 3	Permintaan Aishah & Leftenan Adnan – A Life Story	Won	
2005	Pesta Perdana	Best Comedy Act	Dol & Minah Nak Kahwin	Won	
2005	Pesta Perdana	Most Popular Artiste	Dol & Minah Nak Kahwin	Won	
2007	Anugerah Bintang Popular Berita Harian	Most Popular TV Actor	Janji Diana	Nominated	
2008	Anugerah Bintang Popular Berita Harian	Most Popular TV Actor	Emil Emilda	Nominated	
2009	Anugerah Bintang Popular Berita Harian	Most Popular TV / Film Actor	Rahsia Hati / Evolusi KL Drift	Nominated	
2010	Anugerah Bintang Popular Berita Harian	Most Popular TV / Film Actor	Habil & Qabil / Evolusi KL Drift 2	Nominated	
2011	Anugerah Bintang Popular Berita Harian	Most Popular TV Actor	Nora Elena	Nominated	
2011	Anugerah Bintang Popular Berita Harian	Most Popular Film Actor	Ombak Rindu	Won	
2011	Anugerah Bintang Popular Berita Harian	Most Popular Artiste	Ombak Rindu	Won	
2012	Anugerah Bintang Popular Berita Harian	Most Popular TV Actor	Adam dan Hawa	Won	
2013	Anugerah Bintang Popular Berita Harian	Most Popular Film Actor	KL Gangster 2	Won	
2013	Anugerah Bintang Popular Berita Harian	Most Popular Artiste	KL Gangster 2	Won	
