= KL Gangster =

2011 Malaysian action film

- Directed by: Syamsul Yusof
- Screenplay by: Syamsul Yusof
- Produced by: Yusof Haslam
- Starring: Aaron Aziz; Syamsul Yusof; Adi Putra; Soffi Jikan; Zizan Razak
- Cinematography: Omar Ismail
- Edited by: Hisham Jupri; Syamsul Yusof
- Production company: Skop Productions
- Release date: 9 June 2011 (Malaysia)
- Running time: 81 minutes
- Country: Malaysia
- Language: Malay
- Budget: MYR 1.51 million
- Box office: MYR 11.74 million

KL Gangster is a 2011 Malaysian Malay-language action thriller film written and directed by Syamsul Yusof, (who also starred in the film). The film stars Aaron Aziz, Adi Putra, Soffi Jikan and Zizan Razak. KL Gangster follows Malek (Aziz), a former gangster fresh out of prison, who wants to change his life.

KL Gangster is reported as one of the first Malaysian-made films to reach the collection point of $3,309,610 (10 million) in local cinemas. KL Gangster (reaching past the 10 million mark) beat the overall record held by Ngangkung (another Malaysian-made film) which released in 2010. A prequel, KL Gangster 2, was released in 2013.

== Plot ==
KL Gangster tells the story of two brothers Malek (Aaron Aziz) and Jai (Adi Putra) who are entrapped in the gangster world. Malek was imprisoned for years for being betrayed by his own group's mastermind, Shark (Syamsul Yusof), a stepchild to the King (Ridzuan Hashim), a leader of the most influential secret societies in KL. After his release from prison, Malek wants to change his perception of life and stay away from the black life as a gangster.

Routine normal life while caring for his aged mother, but as a former prisoner stigmatised by society is quite difficult for Malek at first. He is often interrupted by former gangster members who still bear a grudge with him, until the King appears, and offers help to Malek start so he can start his new life. The King had ordered his men not to disrupt Malek, which is disliked by Shark, who wants to be the next "King" in KL. In contrast, his brother, Jai, who is still alive, has continued to link himself with the gangster world.

For Jai, the material luxuries of life is everything, and believes that this can only be achieved with the black world of work, willing to do anything for money and power. To do this, Jai completes missions for Shark. Jai is the one who will step forward to help Shark in any fight or gang confrontation, quickly becoming his right-hand man. But with the emergence of Malek, Shark feels increasingly threatened, feeling challenged. With various possible ways to bring down Malek, every single plan is constantly thwarted by his stepfather, King, who often defends Malek, regarding himself and Malek as friends.

King does not enjoy the hassle of constantly thwarting Shark's attempts to get at Malek, with Shark now involving other gangster groups to get at Malek. This makes the relationship with King and Shark cold. For King, reconciling with Malek is helping and showing a good gesture towards him. For Shark, Malek causes everything wrong.

With Shark ordered to remove Malek's brother, Jai, to get at Malek directly, loyalty becomes tested.

== Cast ==
- Aaron Aziz as Malek
- Syamsul Yusof as Shark
- Adi Putra as Jai
- Soffi Jikan as Ajib
- Zizan Razak as Abang Long Fadil
- Ridzuan Hashim as King
- Adam Corrie as Dragon
- Ku Faridah as Mak
- Sheera Iskandar as Zati/Zeti
- Anna Halim as Erin
- Zalfie Md Nor as Gang Jai
- Razib Salimin as Cicak
- Zack Taipan as Nuar
- Jesse Lim as Tony
- Zazly Baginda as Nightclub Boss
- P. Jeganathan as Thug
- Megat Terawis as Uncle at the Wholesale Market

== Reception ==
=== Critical response ===
Gua.com.my gave KL Gangster 4/5 stars, commenting on the film as "realistic". Azwan Annuar, however, commented more on the story stating: "there is enough action in the film, but it is also a simple story. A connecting story of triad groups in Kuala Lumpur. It can be said of the conflict that exists in the reality of the community here."

According to The Portal, who publish commentaries before films are screened to the public, described the acting portrayed by each character as "fascist". According to another review, "the effectiveness of the highlighted characters managed to impress the audience and makes the story interesting to watch. Praise should be given to each film actor, especially Zizan Razak, who gives such good acting that will have viewers in stitches. Praise should be given to Syamsul Yusof as well, who successfully highlighted the good side of acting and managed to inspire the character he portrayed."

=== Box office ===
On the first day of the screening, the film managed to collect RM1.5 million. This figure reached RM6.2 million after four days, and then topped the collection chart in Malaysian cinemas on its first weekend (9 to 15 June 2011), to overcome Hollywood films, including Super 8, X-Men: First Class and Kung Fu Panda 2.

Just after the end of its second week in cinemas, there were rumours that KL Gangster reached a total of RM10.3 million thus surpassing the record of RM8.18 million held by Ngangkung produced by Metrowealth Movies Production by end of 2010. During its theatrical run KL Gangster grossed in total of RM11.74 million, maintained a solid position as highest-grossing Malaysian film for two and a half years, until it was outranked by The Journey in February 2014.

After screening in cinemas, KL Gangster films were available on iflix.

=== Controversy ===
Despite the warm welcome to the visitors of cinema and the film's reviewer, but KL Gangster was not free from objection to some parties, such as the Pekida foundation, who reportedly wanted to sue the director, Syamsul Yusof. Also involved in this case is the film Share, another Malaysian film with a similar theme as KL Gangster and premiered a month earlier. Pekida expressed their disappointment with the Film Censorship Board for approving the films involved. Although this controversy caused KL Gangster to lose movie buys, the movie eventually won six awards at the Malaysian Film Festival (FFM) and four Blockbuster Awards.

== Prequel and spin-off ==
A prequel titled, KL Gangster 2, was released on 3 October 2013, with a spin-off titled Abang Long Fadil, with Zizan Razak reprising his Long Fadil character, which was released on 29 May 2014. It spawned two eponymous sequels: Abang Long Fadil 2 released on 24 August 2017 and Abang Long Fadil 3 released on 8 October 2022, making it a trilogy. Two of Abang Long Fadil films are critically acclaimed and commercially successful box office hits compared to its bombed first movie.

Spin-off series KL Gangster: Underworld was released on 16 August 2018, online on video on demand (VOD) service iflix. After receiving positive reception, Season 2 was announced and a prequel to the spin-off series, KL Gangster: Rise to Power will be released on September 19, 2019.
