= KL Gangster 2 =

2013 Malaysian film

- Film poster
- Directed by: Syamsul Yusof
- Written by: Syamsul Yusof
- Produced by: Yusof Haslam
- Starring: Aaron Aziz; Adi Putra; Rosyam Nor; Syamsul Yusof; Soffi Jikan; Zizan Razak; Ridzuan Hashim
- Cinematography: Omar Ismail
- Music by: Hafiz Hamidun
- Production company: Skop Productions
- Distributed by: Grand Brilliance
- Release date: 3 October 2013 (Malaysia)
- Running time: 110 minutes
- Country: Malaysia
- Languages: Malay; Mandarin
- Budget: MYR 4 million
- Box office: MYR 5 million

KL Gangster 2 is a 2013 Malaysian Malay-language action thriller film, directed by Syamsul Yusof and starring Rosyam Nor, Aaron Aziz, Adi Putra, Soffi Jikan and Zizan Razak. It is the prequel to KL Gangster, which was released in 2011, it tells the story of two brothers, Jai and Malik.

The film's production costed RM4.5 million and won two of seven nominations in the 26th Malaysian Film Festival.

== Plot ==
KL Gangster 2 tells a story of two brothers Malik (Aaron Aziz) and Jai (Adi Putra) indirectly caught in the gangsterism world after the death of their father, 10 years ago. Since their father's demise, their families lived in hardship with their mother (Ku Faridah) living in fear caused by threats from loan sharks who came to collect their father's debt. Due to financial problems and hardship, Jai turned aggressive to the point of willing to do anything for money to change his luck, meanwhile gaining the disapproval from his family.

On the other end, Malik is getting bogged down thinking about the problems they faced and coupled with the inspection results from the doctor confirming that his mother is suffering from cancer. Meanwhile, Tailong (Rosyam Nor), who himself is among the biggest gangster heads in Kuala Lumpur, was actively carrying out illegal activities. All of Tailong's actions was not favoured by the other gangsters, but they had to contend with his power. At the same time, King (Ridzuan Hashim) and his stepson, Shark (Syamsul Yusof) planned to strengthen their position by taking down Tailong and calling for help from his long-time best friend, Malik, and offering huge sums of money to him.

Malik accepted the offer in the intention of covering the medical cost for his mother and to pay his father's debt. But his activity was not consented by his mother and both the latter and his brother were driven out of their home. King became increasingly powerful with the help of Malik and his presence made Tailong feel threatened. He plans to eliminate King and Malik. A huge fight later ensued between the two groups when Tailong ambushed King and Malik at a night club. They were almost defeated by Tailong and King was incapacitated, but Malik's fighting skills proved to be a match even for Tailong. Shortly after, the police arrived and they managed to escape. At the same time, Malik spotted a tattoo on Tailong's body similar to the one the murderer of his father had. The conflict and animosity between Malek and Tailong grew from that point onwards.

When Tailong discovered that Jai and Malik were brothers, he overpowered Jai and proceeded to kidnap their sister Zati (Sheera Iskandar) and raped her in front of Jai. Malik went home to find his mother suffering severe injuries due to being beaten by Tailong's men. He had no clue as to what his siblings are going through, and he rushed his mother to the hospital. Tailong finally called Malik to the port if he wants to save his siblings in the final showdown.

With the help of Ajib, a section head who sees Malik as his blood brother (Soffi Jikan) and his men, Malik managed to take down Tailong's men. Malik and Jai teamed up, succeeding in defeating Tailong and afterwards handed him over to Shark, who shot him dead. They then rushed to the hospital with money taken from Tailong's briefcase to pay the deposit so that their mother can undergo surgery. Although this results in their mother and sister disowning them who sees their involvement in the gang world brought upon ruin to the family, just as their late father did. In the aftermath, Jai stubbornly continues to remain in the criminal world in his quest for riches, and Malek was arrested by the police after being framed by Shark, who planted the evidence in his car. While he was being escorted to the police station, Malek prayed to God for the safety of his family while he was serving time.

At the same time, Tailong's death caused a drastic change in the gang hierarchy. Credited for taking down Tailong, Shark quickly rose to prominence and he became the gang leader in KL.

The story of Malik and Jai would later continue in the first film, KL Gangster.

== Cast ==
- Aaron Aziz as Malek
- Adi Putra as Jai
- Rosyam Nor as Tailong
- Syamsul Yusof as Shark
- Soffi Jikan as Ajib
- Zizan Razak as Abang Long Fadil
- Ridzuan Hashim as King
- Adam Corrie as Dragon
- Ku Faridah as Mak, Malik, Jai and Zati's mother
- Angeline Tan as Susane
- Sheera Iskandar as Zati/Zeti, Malik and Jai's sister
- Ammar Alfian as Tailong Bodyguard
- Wong Sip Nen as Gangster Leader 1
- Deen Maidin as Gangster Leader 2
- Zack Taipan as Gangster Leader 3
- Jacky Kam as Gangster Leader 4
- Zalfie Md Nor as Jai Gang
- Iqbal Abdullah as Jerung's Gang
- Ruzzlan Abdullah Shah as Jerung's Gang 2
- Kamal Affandi Hashim as Police Officer
- Saiful Bahari as Police Officer 2
- Lando Zawawi
- Mustaqim Bahadon

== Filming ==
The film was shot began 1 December 2011 and choose several locations such as Kuala Lumpur, Klang Valley and Batu Gajah, Perak as the filming location.

The film finally got the Malaysian actor, Rosyam Nor after Syamsul Yusof failed to reach him for KL Gangster due to his hectic work schedule. According to Syamsul, he does want Rosyam to be cast in the action movie because the character is specially created for him. The last time Rosyam starred in the 2006 action film, Castello.

During the filming, Aaron Aziz suffers a back injury while performing combat action with Rosyam Nor. He was sent to the hospital for treatment.

Malaysian criminal analyst, Kamal Affandi Hashim make a special appearance in the movie, where he appeared in the ending scene.

== Controversy ==
A month before its cinematic release on 3 October 2013, the entire film was leaked online and sold as pirated DVDs.

The stress brought about by piracy took its toll on Syamsul, who has refused to appear at the film's promotional activities and has been avoiding the press since the issue arose.

The film producer Datuk Yusof Haslam as saying that his son was so "emotionally disturbed" that he has decided to give up film-making. Due to the incident, Skop Productions and Grand Brilliance held a press conference at the Malaysian National Film Development Corporation (FINAS) on 30 August 2013.

== Spin-off ==
=== Abang Long Fadil ===
After the release of KL Gangster and KL Gangster 2, its spin-off, entitled Abang Long Fadil released in cinemas in 2014. It spawned two eponymous sequels: Abang Long Fadil 2, released in 2017 and Abang Long Fadil 3, released in 2022, making them a trilogy. Both of these films are critically acclaimed and commercially successful box office hits compared to its bombed first film.

=== Tailong ===
A spin-offs film series in development which tells the story about Tailong's character (Datuk Rosyam Nor) life before entering the world of gangster and becoming the biggest gangster in KL.
