= Scha Al-Yahya =

Malaysian actress, model and TV host

- شا اليحيى
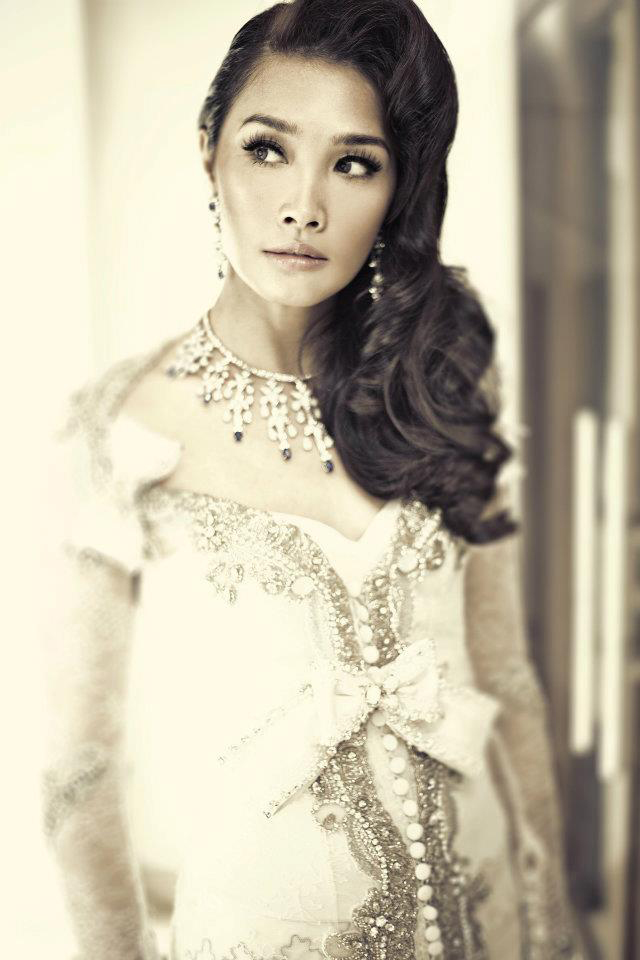
- Born: Sharifah Nor Azean binti Syed Mahadzir Al-Yahya; 30 May 1983 (age 43); Sungai Petani, Kedah, Malaysia
- Occupations: Model; Actress; Host Television; Former Flight Stewardess
- Years active: 2006–present
- Height: 5 ft 7 in (170 cm)
- Spouse: Awal Ashaari (m. 2012)
- Children: 2

Sharifah Nor Azean binti Syed Mahadzir Al-Yahya (born 30 May 1983), better known by her stage name Scha Al-Yahya, is a Malaysian model, actress and TV host, who plays the lead character Dania, a tomboy who struggles to achieve her dream of becoming a flight attendant, in the highly-rated TV series Awan Dania aired on Astro Ria for three seasons.

== Life and career ==
Scha was born in Sungai Petani, Kedah to a family of Malay, Hadhrami Arab and Chinese descent. She is the second of four siblings. She holds a diploma in information technology from PTPL College, Shah Alam and previously worked as a flight stewardess in the local commercial airline, Airasia. She quit flying when she started her career after winning the Dewi Remaja beauty pageant organised through Majalah Remaja, a local Malaysian Malay-language teen magazine, in 2006. Al-Yahya was then cast in a role by director Azizi "Chunk" Adnan.

== Personal life ==
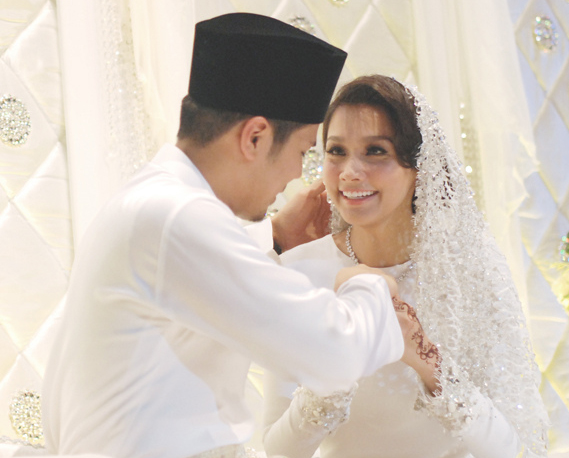
Scha on her wedding day with Awal

Scha married Awal Ashaari on May 4, 2012, after three years of dating. They met in 2008 when they co-hosted a reality series called Sehati Berdansa. Awal surprised her with his proposal live on TV through Propaganza, a local gossip TV programme guest-hosted by the actress. The couple welcomed their first child together, a daughter they named Lara Alana, on July 22, 2014. Their second daughter was born via caesarean on 12 February 2021, and her name was revealed to be Lyla Amina.

== Filmography ==
=== Film ===
Year	Title	Role	Notes
2008	Antoofighter: Amukan Drakulat!	Lara	Debut film appearances
2008	Histeria	Alissa	
2009	Papadom	Shasha	
2009	Dimensi Cinta		
2010	Evolusi KL Drift 2	Aleya	
2011	Libas	Ratna	
2011	Aku Bukan Tomboy	Farisha	
2013	Awan Dania The Movie	Dania	
2013	Papadom 2	Shasha	
2013	Dampak	Suria	
2020	Bikin Filem	Zarina Ishak	
2022	Air Force The Movie: Selagi Bernyawa	Captain Nur Liyana	
2025	Telaga Suriram	Inspector Kamilia	
2026	5 Bomoh	Sakinah	

=== Telemovie ===
Year	Title	Role	TV channel
2008	Terlalu Istimewa	Ana	TV3
2009	Naik Hantu	Ziffa	Astro Ria
2009	Lemas Dalam Cinta	Sofi	TV1
2010	Prebet Jamilah	Jamilah	Astro Ria
2011	Geisha Melayu Terakhir	Suraya	Astro Ria
2011	Prebet Jamilah 2	Jamilah	Astro Ria
2012	Cikgu Timah Tukar Sekolah	Cikgu Timah	Astro Ria
2013	Sweet Lola	Lola	TV9
2016	Isteri Vs. Tunang Raya	Alana Sofea	Astro Ria
2016	Pen Merah Pen Biru	Ain	Astro Ria
2018	Baju Raya Eksklusif	Nurin	TV3
2020	Racun Suami Jahanam	Maria	Astro Citra

=== Television series ===
Year	Title	Role	TV channel
2006	Impian Illyana	Yatie	TV3
2007	Honeyz		TV1
2007	Sadiq & Co		NTV7
2008	Luna Fantasiku	Sarah	GUA Portal (Online Drama Series)
2008	Awan Dania (season 1)	Dania	Astro Ria
2008	Bella		TV3
2009	Chef Jo		TV3
2009	Awan Dania (season 2)	Dania	Astro Ria
2010	Awan Dania (season 3)	Dania	Astro Ria
2010	K.I.T.A. Carefree	Kiera	Astro Ria
2011	Dunia Kita	Rania	Astro Ria
2011	Mimi Mencari Cinta	Mimi	Astro Warna
2011	Kelaaas Kau Maria	Maria	Astro Ria
2013	Jodoh	Olly	Astro Ria
2014	3 Campur 2	Mira	Astro Ceria
2016	Isteri Vs. Tunang	Alana Sofea	Astro Ria
2017	Urusan Hati Cik Drama Queen	Syazlin	Astro Ria
2017	3 Dara Kg. Com	Esah	Astro Warna
2018	Ti Amo, Sweetheart 100 Hari!	Rania	Astro Ria

=== Television ===
Year	Program	TV channel
2009	Sehati Sejiwa	TV1
2009	Sampaikan Aidilfitri	TV9
2009	Chopp	TV9
2009	Sehati Berdansa (season 3)	Astro Ria
2010	Kata Kau	Astro Ria
2013–2014	Muzik Muzik	TV3
2016	Gempak Superstar	Astro Ria

== Videography ==
Year	Music Video
2009	"State of Trance" with Dj Juice
2009	"Mencari Konklusi" with Fauzi Baadila and Hujan

=== TV commercials ===
- Bio Essence
- Hotlink
- Olay
- Nokia
- Celcom
- Yakult
- Rexona

== Awards and nominations ==
Year	Award	Category	Outcome
2005/2006	Dewi Remaja	Beauty Pageant	Won
2006	EH! 20 Yang Anggun		Nominated
2008	50 Gorgeous Female Magazine		Nominated
2009	Anugerah Bintang Popular Berita Harian	Most Popular Female New Artist	Nominated
2009	Malaysia Film Festival	Best Supporting Actress	Nominated
2010	EH! 20 Yang Anggun		Nominated
2010	Anugerah Bintang Popular Berita Harian	Most Popular TV Actress	Nominated
2010	Anugerah Bintang Popular Berita Harian	Most Popular Film Actress	Nominated
2010	Shout! Awards	Hot Chick Award	Won
2011	Anugerah Skrin	Anugerah Sinaran Pantene	Won
2011	Anugerah Bintang Popular Berita Harian	Most Popular TV Actress	Nominated
2012	Anugerah Pilihan Pembaca Media Hiburan	Anugerah Jelita	Nominated
2012	Anugerah Stail EH!	Selebriti Wanita Paling Bergaya	Nominated
2012	Anugerah Stail EH!	Selebriti Paling Fotogenik	Won
2012	Anugerah Stail EH!	Pasangan Selebriti Pilihan (dengan Awal Ashaari)	Nominated
2012	Shout! Awards	Hot Chick Award	Nominated
2012	Anugerah Blokbuster	Anugerah Heroin Terhebat	Nominated
2013	Anugerah Melodi	Artis Wanita Pilihan	Nominated
2013	Anugerah Melodi	Pasangan Pilihan (dengan Awal Ashaari)	Won
2013	Anugerah Lawak Warna	Artis Komedi Wanita Terbaik (TV)	Nominated
2013	Anugerah Lawak Warna	Artis Komedi Wanita Paling Popular	Nominated
2013	Anugerah Bintang Popular Berita Harian	Artis Wanita Stailo	Nominated
2013	Shout! Awards	Hot Chick Award	Nominated
2014	Anugerah Stail EH!	Selebriti Wanita Paling Bergaya	Nominated
2014	Anugerah Stail EH!	Selebriti Paling Fotogenik	Won
2014	Anugerah Stail EH!	Pasangan Selebriti Pilihan (dengan Awal Ashaari)	Won
2015	Anugerah MeleTOP Era 2015	Couple MeleTOP	Won
2017	InTrend Gala 2017	Selebriti Fesyen Ikonik	Won

== Endorsements ==
- Yakult Cultured Milk Drink
- Skintific Skincare
- Bio-Essence Skin Care
- Silky Shine Shampoo
- Carefree
- Watsons
- Kenanga Wholesale City Mall
- Avon Fragrances
- SNE Beautskin
- Rexona Deodorant
- Astro Megadrama Exclusive Talent
- JAKEL
