= TV2 (Malaysian TV network) =

Over-the-air TV channel

RTM TV2
- Current logo, an iteration of the 2009 logo, used since 2012.
- Country: Malaysia
- Broadcast area: Malaysia; Singapore; Brunei; Thailand (South Thailand, particularly Songkhla, Narathiwat, Yala and Satun); Indonesia (West Kalimantan, North Kalimantan and Riau Islands); Philippines (particularly southern Palawan and Tawi-Tawi)
- Headquarters: Angkasapuri, Kuala Lumpur, Malaysia

Programming
- Languages: Malay; English; Chinese (Mandarin and Cantonese); Indian (Punjabi, Tamil, Urdu and Hindi); Thai; Indonesian; Tagalog; Korean; Turkish
- Picture format: 16:9 HDTV (1080i)

Ownership
- Owner: Radio Televisyen Malaysia
- Sister channels: TV1; TV Okey; Berita RTM; Sukan+; RTM World

History
- Launched: 17 November 1969; 57 years ago; 1 April 2019; 7 years ago (MYTV) (HD)
- Closed: 31 March 2019; 7 years ago (MYTV) (SD)
- Former names: Rangkaian Kedua (17 November 1969 - 31 March 1978); RTM 2 (1 April 1978 - 31 January 1990, 1 April 2006 - 31 December 2008); TV2 (1 February 1990 - 31 March 2006, 1 January 2009 - present)

Links
- Website: RTM TV2

Availability

Terrestrial
- MYTV: Channel 102 (HD)

Streaming media
- RTMKlik: Watch live

RTM TV2 (stylised as tv2) is a Malaysian free-to-air public television channel owned and operated by the Radio Televisyen Malaysia, a broadcasting department of the Malaysian Government. Launched on 17 November 1969, TV2 is the second and second oldest TV station in Malaysia. The channel features mostly English, Mandarin and Tamil news and talk shows, the latter two languages were mainly produced for the dominant minority Chinese and Indian communities, whilst the English news functions for the nation's multiracial population whose dominant lingua franca or first language is the latter. It also offers some in-house, local and international entertainment programs, including reality shows, films and dramas as well as sports programming.

== History ==
Tamil News title.

=== Setup ===
The idea of a second television channel in Malaysia emerged as early as 1964. The previous year, Singapore gained two television channels (on channels 5 and 8). The plan for the second channel out of Kuala Lumpur was outlined as part of the arrival of equipment from the United Kingdom, which was set to arrive in April-May 1964. The second channel was scheduled to begin its services in June 1964.

The then-Information Minister, Senu bin Abdul Rahman announced that Television Malaysia was going to start a second channel with the initial target date for its launch estimated to be on 8 February 1969. The plan was to coincide with the move of the television facilities to Bukit Puteri (Angkasapuri). The new channel would air programmes sponsored by commercial organisations.

An attempt at starting an experimental broadcast was held in December 1968. The aim was not to disrupt the programming of the existing channel, which was temporarily blocked to air a Quran reading competition. The trial run of the "second channel" ran from 14 to 19 December and was limited to a six-day relay of the programming usually seen on the existing service.

The channel broadcast on the following frequencies:

- 8 (Kuala Lumpur, Penang)
- 9 (Ipoh, Malacca)
- 10 (Johor Bahru)
- 2 (Taiping)
- 6 (Kluang)

The initial launch date scheduled for 8 February 1969 was ultimately scrapped, being delayed to the end of the year - initially, April was the new planned target.

Recruitment for the new channel started in July in order to accelerate the process for its launch. The launch date was announced in September: 17 November, commencing its broadcasts from Angkasapuri. The existing channel would be renamed Siaran Nasional while TV2 would be "somewhat commercialised", according to TV Malaysia director Ow Keng Law.

=== 1969–1984 ===
TV2, then Rangkaian Kedua (Second Network) began operations on 17 November 1969, when Televisyen Malaysia (now known as TV1) bifurcated into two channels and merge with Radio Malaysia to become the present-day broadcasting department. Then, TV1 was known as Rangkaian Pertama (First Network). The channel opened at 9pm, starting with a speech by Tunku Abdul Rahman followed at 9:15pm by a special programme introducing viewers to the new television facilities. The channel closed at 10:45pm. The frequencies were the same as the "emergency frequencies" used by what was now Siaran Nasional in December 1968.

The new channel had a "dual role": entertainment and goodwill coupled by a nationalistic feeling. Initially it wasn't available in the east coast, when TV Malaysia put wrestling matches on TV2 in 1970, when they were achieving its apex in popularity, viewers in the area were deprived.

Like TV1, TV2 started broadcasting in colour since 28 December 1978 in Peninsular Malaysia. During its early years, it only broadcast in the evenings, with daytime broadcasts for schools under the TV Pendidikan banner from 1972 until 1999, when daytime transmission was introduced on the channel.

Colour broadcasts began on 7 May 1979, with 14 hours a week of programmes in colour.

In May 1982, it was announced that TV2 would start broadcasting to East Malaysia on 31 August 1983, Malaysia's Independence Day (or Hari Merdeka), enabling the channel to have total nationwide coverage. The channel's nationwide operations cost a total sum of M$ 23 million.

=== Post–1984 ===
In March 1984, TV2 began airing Cantonese and Hokkien dramas, replacing its Wednesday evening Chinese movie slot. Such dramas, produced in Hong Kong and Taiwan respectively and contain no violence, would be sourced from a local distributor. TV2 had previously aired the TVB-produced Cantonese drama One Plus One in December 1983, and in 1981, replacing its two Mandarin drama slots which were on "annual leave". The first regularly-airing Cantonese drama, Women CID, began on 7 March 1984, airing two episodes back-to-back on Wednesdays at 8:30 pm.

The first locally-produced Cantonese drama, The Shell Game, began airing in January 1987.

In late 1987, TV1 along with TV2 revamped their programming to compete with rival TV3 with movies, American serials and Chinese dramas. Public affairs programmes were planned to be included. Sports programming airs at 10 pm. Sign off time were now at midnight on weekdays and 1 am on weekends.

English programmes and English news broadcasts airing on TV1 would move to TV2 as an effort to convert TV1 into an all-Malay channel in stages in late 1987.

On 1 February 1988, TV2's English, Mandarin and Tamil news broadcasts became 25 minutes long instead of 20 minutes.

TV2 began adding a weekly Chinese action drama series in late 1988 to complement the existing Chinese programmes. RTM had planned to add the series in July 1988.

RTM had plans to introduce separate primetime news programmes for TV1 and TV2 in 1991. At that time, TV2 simulcast TV1's 8 pm news. The Information Ministry believes that along with TV3's news, it would provide "a wider range of information through the electronic media" and "keep viewers informed of developments" from Malaysia and abroad. In July 1992, RTM decided that TV2's news will be on local, foreign and economy. The English news broadcast would also be moved from its 11:30 pm slot.

As a response to requests by viewers in states where Friday is a holiday, TV2 began adding six hours for its Friday broadcasts starting January 1992. Along with that, TV2 will start Friday-to-Sunday weekend broadcasts at the same time as TV1, which is at 8 am.

TV2 began reducing the airing of Chinese programmes in 1991 to promote the production of local Chinese content that reflected the Malaysian Chinese culture, using the airtime saved from not airing action films from Hong Kong. The airtime for Chinese programmes in 1992 was at seven and a half hours, with an hour more added in 1993.

In April 1993, TV2 and TV1 underwent a rescheduling of timeslots of its news broadcasts.

Starting in 1994, RTM revamp TV1 and TV2 programmes by airing religion, information and educational programmes in primetime slot. TV2's English news began aired during primetime on 27 December 1994. In April 1995, broadcast transmissions of TV2 and its sister channel TV1 were disrupted for two hours due to a power surge after Tenaga Nasional's cables went damaged.

In conjunction with RTM's 50th anniversary on 1 April 1996, TV2 began 18 hour broadcast while its sister channel, TV1 began 24 hour broadcast.

As part of Ramadan, TV2 began airing the American series "Islam And Ramadan" on 6 January 1997 to help the non-Malay Muslim viewers learn more about Islam.

In April 1998, TV1 and TV2 decided to decrease transmission hours and save RM50 million in costs. Its sister channel TV1 would lose one hour of its broadcast day, with the sign on time now at 7 am. A similar proposal made in November 1998, meant to start in January 1999, was to "cut operating costs" and would save RM30 million. In April 2001, in conjunction with RTM's 55th anniversary, TV2 and its sister channel, TV1 underwent restructuring on their respective scheduling time to adapt with current situation.

On 1 January 2003, TV2 and its sister channel, TV1 underwent programme rescheduling in order to "give a satisfaction" to its viewers and to attract its advertisers. The new scheduling saw both channels airing programmes in English. In August the same year, both channels went on to rescheduling their news broadcast.

Upon RTM's new logo launching in August 2004, TV2 along with TV1 launches their respective new logo and image branding. At the same time, TV2 adopt a new slogan, "Saluran Famili Anda" (Your Family Channel) and began to airing more variety and informative shows. In February 2005, TV2 and its sister channel, TV1 programmes began to aired on MiTV until the latter's shutdown in November 2006.

On 1 April 2006, in conjunction with RTM's 60th anniversary, TV2 and its sister channel, TV1 went rebranding and reverted back to their respective 1978 brand name.

Since 3 April 2006, the channel began to broadcast 24 hours a day to offer more programmes for viewers who stay up late to watch television. Its sister channel, TV1 followed suit more than 6 years later on 21 August 2012.

In 2008, TV2 along with TV1 gained the increasing of viewership ratings and revenue in the last six months. On 1 January 2009, RTM2 along with its sister channel RTM1 reverted to its old primary name, which has been used since 1990, and at the same time, their respective new logo was introduced.

TV2 and its sister channel, TV1 also airs programmes during the Hari Raya Aidilfitri celebration annually.

On 1 April 2019, TV2 has started its HDTV broadcasting in conjunction of RTM's 73rd anniversary, and available exclusively through myFreeview DTT service on channel 102.

== Logo history ==
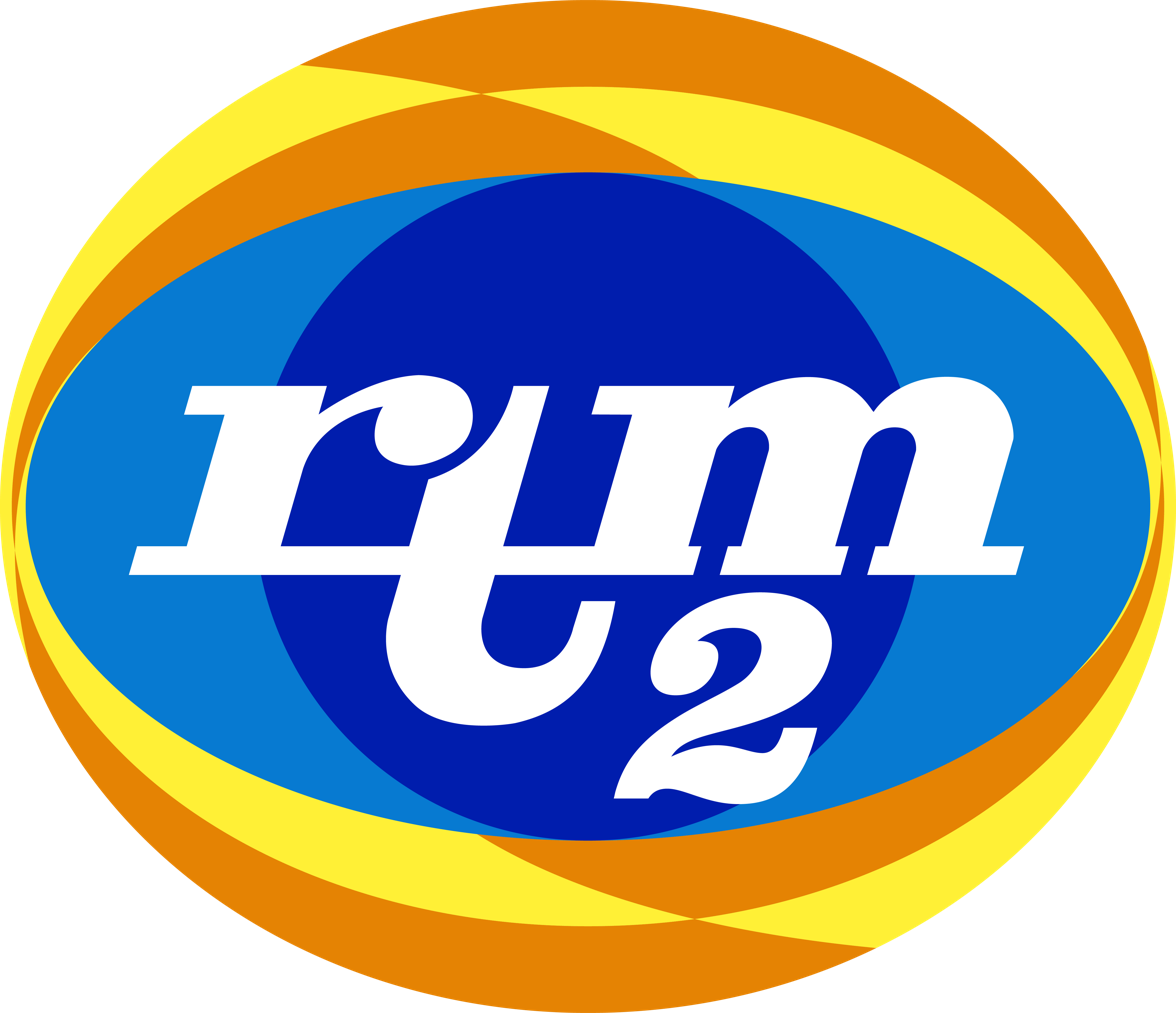
TV2's first logo (1979–1987).

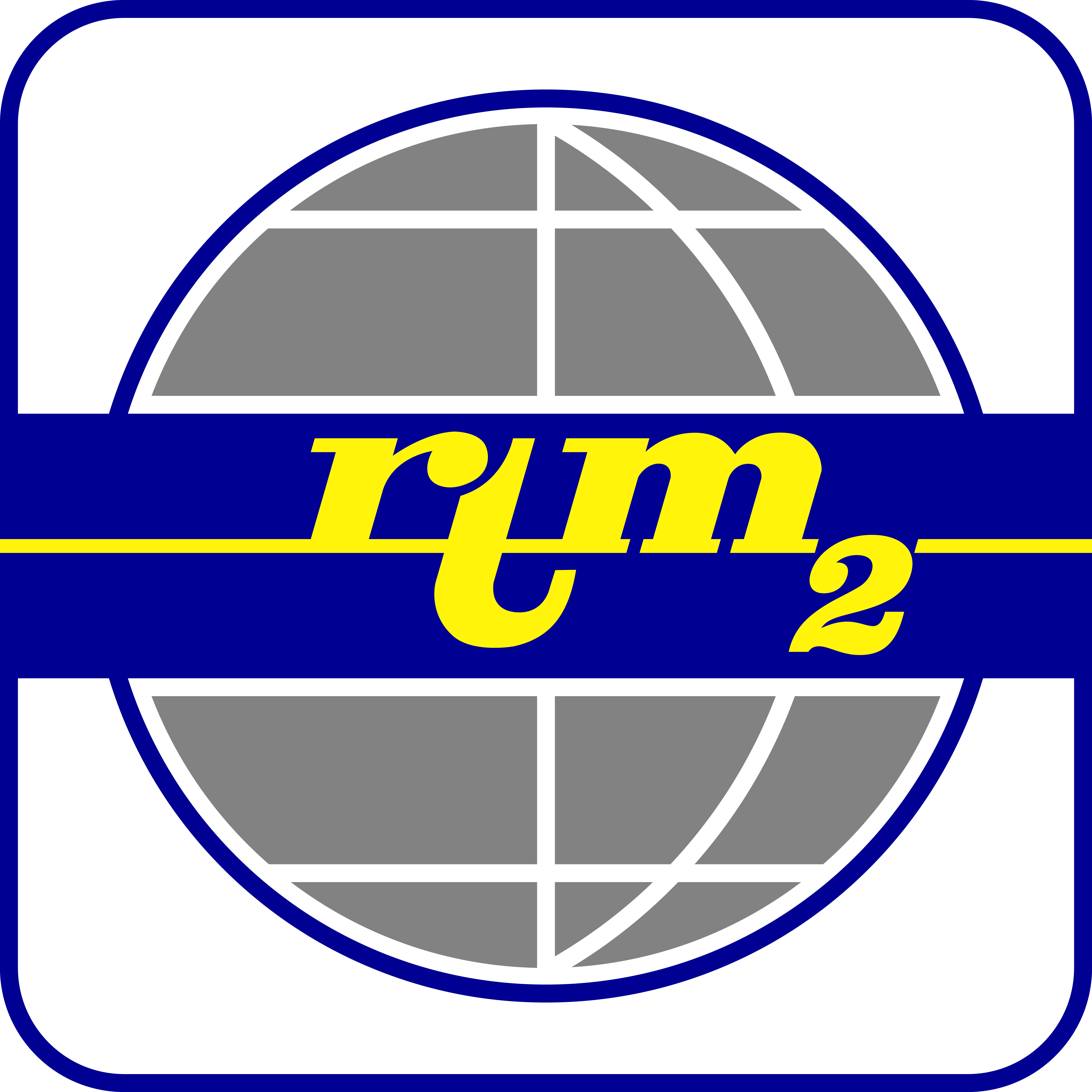
TV2's second logo (1987–1990).

TV2's third logo (1990–2004).

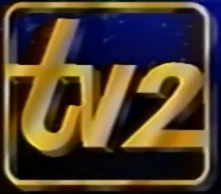
(April 1996-19th August 2004)

Incomplete version (April 1996-19th August 2004)

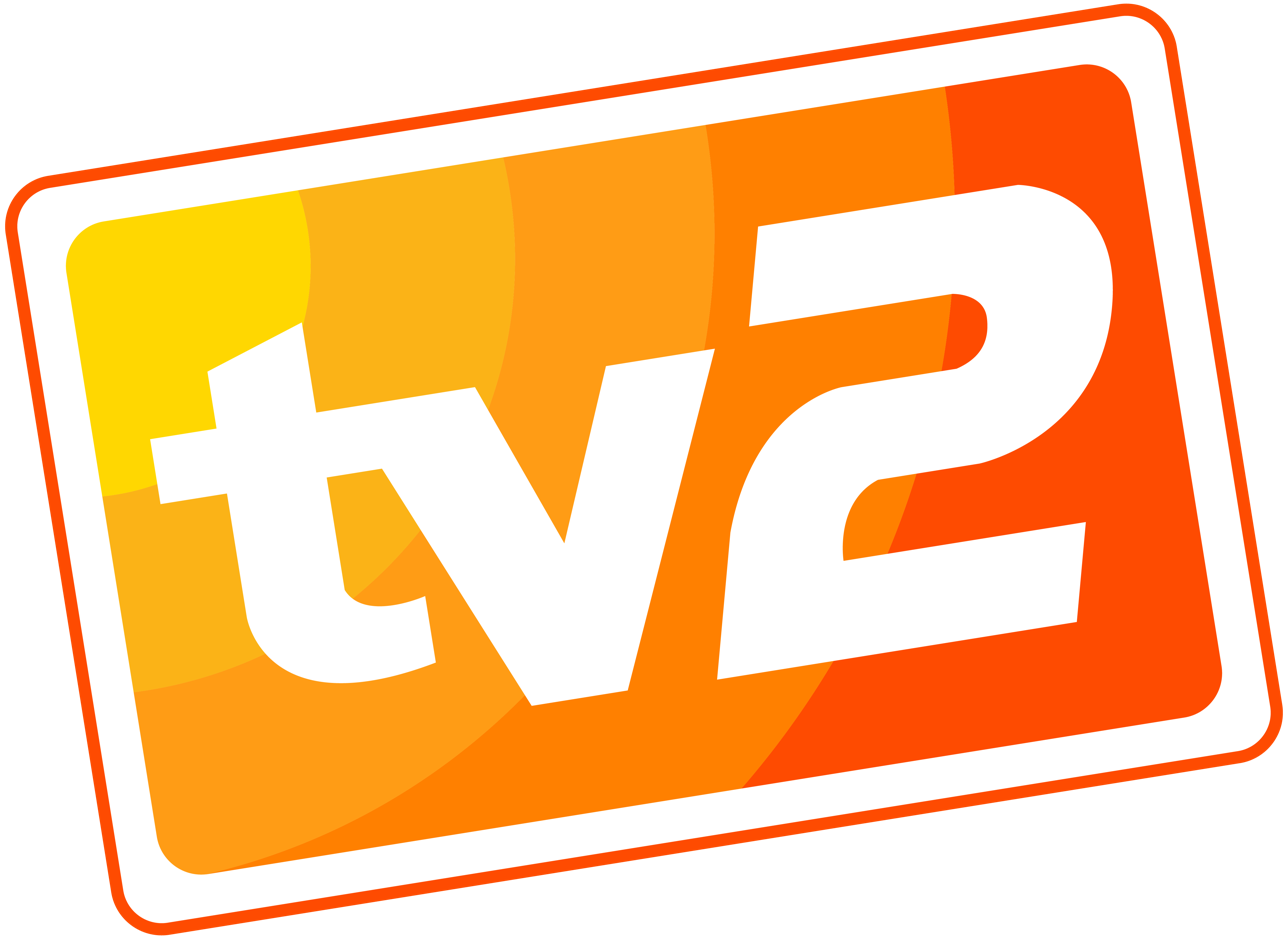
TV2's fourth logo (2004–2006).

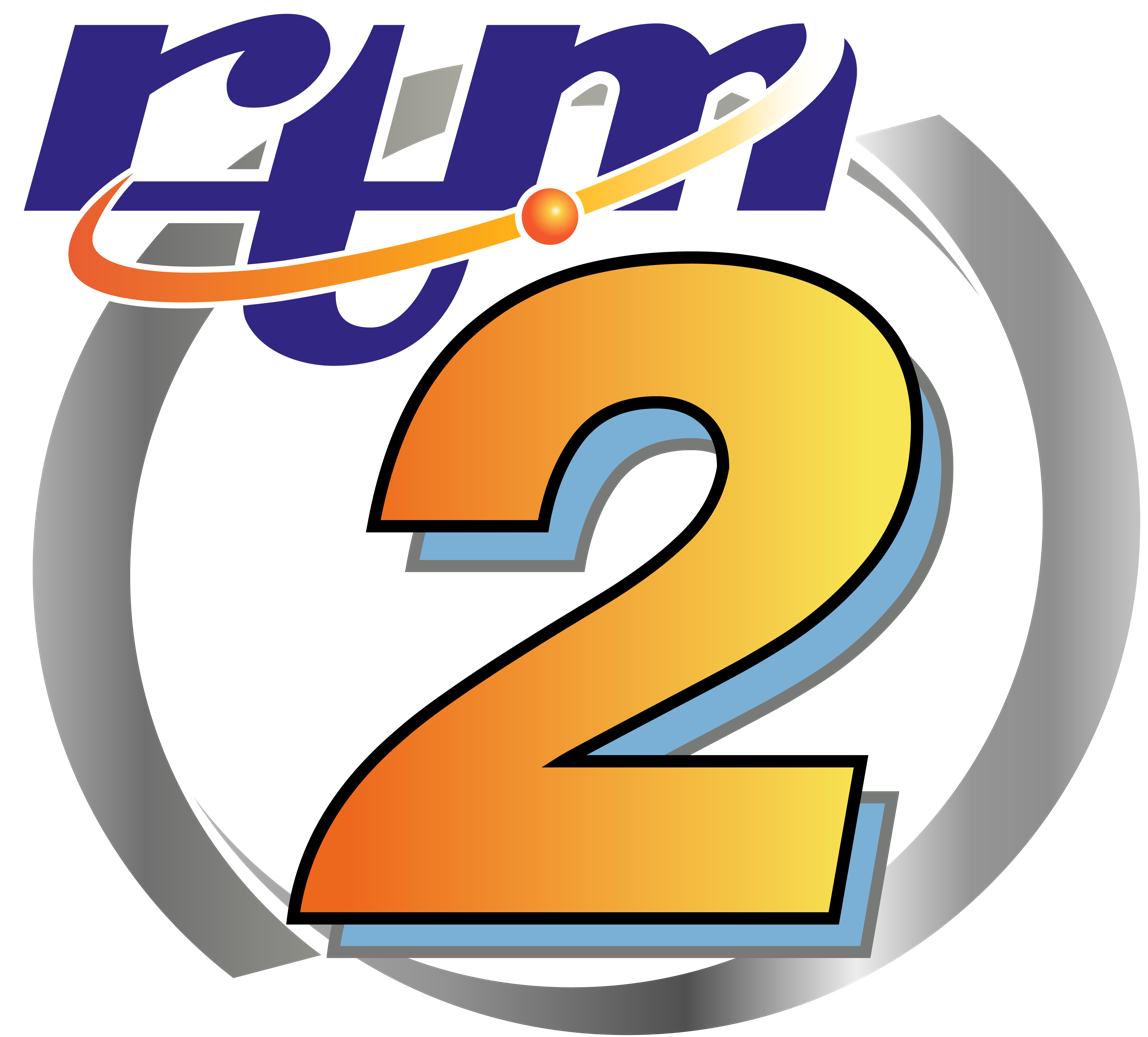
TV2's fifth logo (2006–2008).

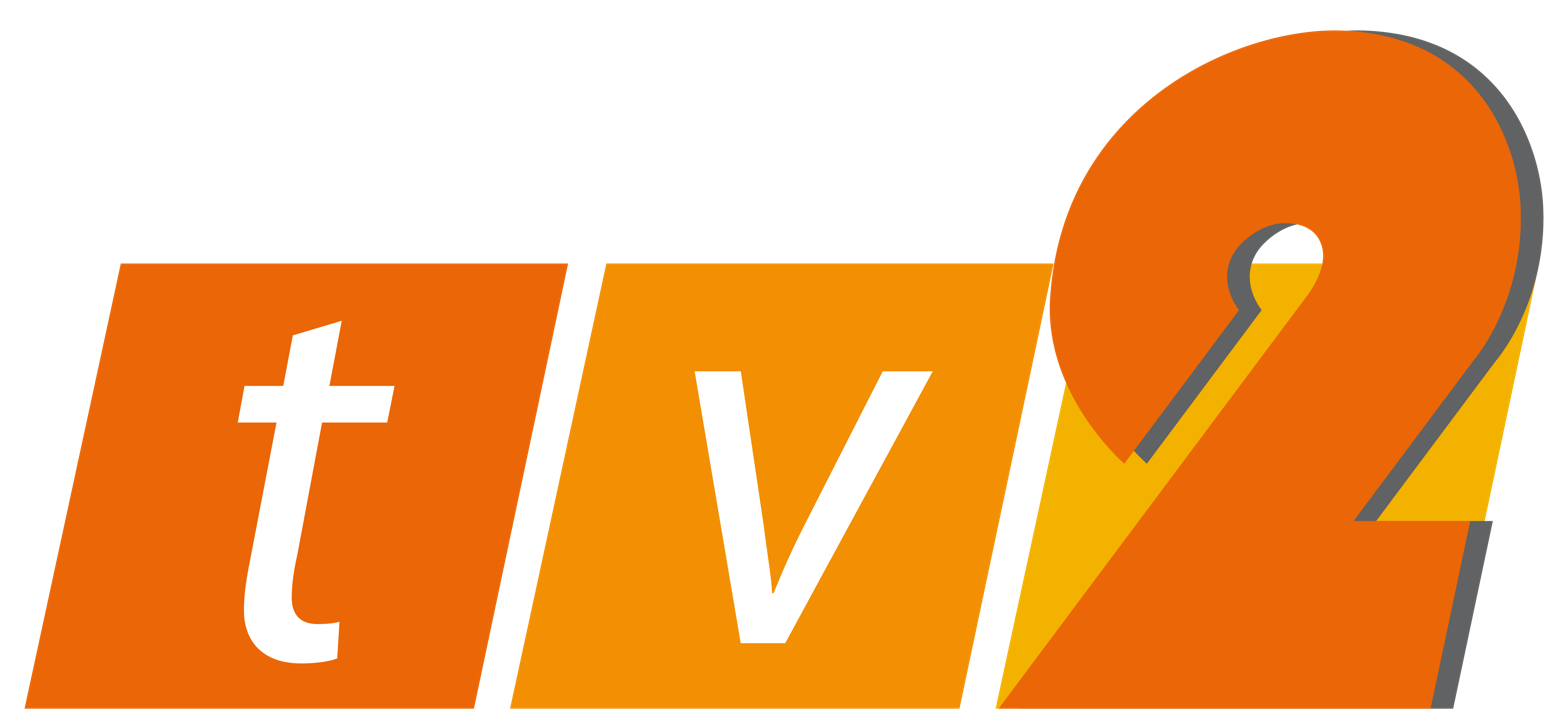
TV2's sixth logo (2009–2011).

TV2's seventh logo (2011–2013).

TV2's eighth and current logo (2013–present).

== See also ==
- List of television stations in Malaysia
- Radio Televisyen Malaysia
- TV1
- TV Okey
- Sukan+
- Berita RTM
