= List of Malaysian films of the 1990s =

This is a list of films produced in Malaysia ordered by year of release in the 1990s.

For an alphabetical listing of Malaysian films see Category:Malaysian films.

Title	Director	Cast	Genre	Notes
1990
Adik	Aziz Sattar	Os, Mustapha Kamal, Noralbaniah, Yusof Wahab, Accapan, Din Glamour, Aziz Sattar, Norizan, Osman Kering, Azmi Suhaimi (Tam), Pudin (Buzen), Vicky Boy, Siti Nor Azhani, Bob, Din Mara, Nasir Rahman, Mohana	Comedy / Family	SV Productions
Driving School	Othman Hafsham	Azmil Mustapha, Ziela Jalil, Julia Rais, Yusof Haslam, Yusni Jaafar, Imuda, Julie Dahlan, Raja Nor Baizura, Jalil Hamid, Kartina Aziz, Edika Yusof, Deon Bakar, Lili Patra, Sabri Yunus, JD Khalid, Kuza, Dilla, Liza Abdullah	Comedy	JD Production
Fenomena	Aziz M. Osman	M. Nasir, Ramona Rahman, Amy Search, Noramarina Zulkifli, Mustapha Maarof	Drama / Musical	Teletrade
Hati Bukan Kristal	Raja Ahmad Alauddin	Redzuan Hashim, Erma Fatima, Julia Rais, Adibah Amin, Zaiton Sameon, Shah Rezza, Imuda, A. Rahim	Drama / Romance	Director's Team; Entered into the 1990 Asia Pacific Film Festival
Isabella	Boyke Roring	Amy Search, Nia Dzulkarnain, Julia Rais, Search	Romance / Musical	P.T. Prima Metropolitan Sakti Film; Indonesia-Malaysia co-production
Janda Meletup	Z. Lokman	Salleh Yaacob, Sophia Mohamed Ariff, Rozie Rashid, Pak Man Telo	Comedy	
Konstabel Mamat		Salleh Yaacob, Ziela Jalil, Kuza, Latiff Ibrahim	Action / Comedy	
Main-Main Hantu	Tommy Chung, Junaidi Dahalan	Nancie Foo, Hamid Gurkha, Melissa Saila, Alice Voon, Lily Patra, Azman Abu Hassan, Noralbaniah, Bibi Yem	Comedy / Horror	Solid Gold Studio
Mat Gelap	Zarul Albakri	Imuda, Liza Othman, Mano Maniam, Kamarool Yusof, Sri Ratu, Jit Murad, Zahim Albakri, Apen Mahidin, Aimen, Lee Su-Feh	Comedy / Animation	ZHA Film Production; First film combining animation and live action produced in Malaysia
Mat Som	Hatta Azad Khan	Imuda, Tiara Jacquelina, Zami Ismail, Adibah Amin	Drama / Comedy	Strawberry FTV; Adapted from comic of the same name by Lat
Mira Edora	Zulkeflie M. Osman	Julia Rais, Noorkumalasari, Mustapha Kamal, Sofia Jane, Ramziela, Rahim Maarof, Accapan, Ruminah Sidek, Bibiana Layola, Sophia Mohamed Ariff, Classmate	Drama / Romance	Take One Productions; Adapted from the novel of the same name by Khadijah Hashim
Musuh Dalam Selimut	M. Jamil	Ijoy Azahari, TS Jeffry		
O.K.	Aziz Sattar	Os, Ochee, Accapan, Sheila Rusly, Din Glamour	Comedy	SV Productions
Part-Time	M. Jamil	Sherie Merlis, Jaafar Onn, Ijam Medicine		
Pening-Pening Lalat	A. R. Badul	A. R. Badul, Mustapha Kamal, Sidi Oraza, Yusni Jaafar, Rozie Rashid, Yastie	Comedy	
Rentak Desa	Rahim Razali	Eman Manan, Fauziah Ahmad Daud, Ebby Saiful, Ziela Jalil, Zulkarnain Ramli, Ahmad Tarmimi Serigar, Abu Bakar Omar, Halim Sabir	Comedy	Angkatan Seniman Abad XX Film Production; Film sets in Kelantan
Siluman Lirikan Ular	Peter Chan	Abdullah Chik, Nancie Foo, Fiza, Yenny Faradia, Johan Tamine		Solid Gold Production; Hong Kong-Indonesia-Malaysia co-production
The Dadah Connection	Toby Russell	Shaharuddin Thamby, Jacinta Lee, Steve Tartaglia, Alex Lowe	Action / Crime	Sunny Film Corporation; Malaysia-United States co-production English-language film
Warna-Warna Hati		Sarimah		
1991
Bayangan Maut (The Shadow of Death)	Yusof Haslam	Yusof Haslam, Noorkumalasari, Sabree Fadhil, Ella, Faizal Hussein, A. Galak, Fid, Ishak Raja Etam, Roslan Ahmad	Drama / Action	Skop Productions; Entered into the 1992 Pyongyang International Film Festival
Bintang Malam	Adman Salleh	Eman Manan, Fauziah Ahmad Daud, Erma Fatima, Shaharuddin Thamby, Latiff Borgiba, Sidek Hussein, Salleh Ben Joned, Zarina Zainuddin, Azean Irdawaty, Samsi Said, Buyong Sasdar	Drama / Action	Nizarman-Sistem Televisyen Malaysia Berhad-50 Corporation co-production Entered into the 1991 Asia Pacific Film Festival and 1992 Pyongyang International Film Festival
Boss	Z. Lokman	Raja Ema, Jasmin Hamid, Didie Alias, Os, Salleh Yaacob, Hussein Abu Hassan, Raja Nor Baizura, Fetty Dzul	Action / Comedy	
Harry Boy	A. R. Badul	Badrul Muhayat, Sofia Jane, Laila Nasir, Azwan Ali, Harry, Linda Zainuddin, Romzy, Ziela Jalil, Norlida Ahmad (Connie), Yusof Haslam, A. R. Badul, Hani Nurzara, Sharifah Edora, Julie Dahlan, Aznah Hamid	Romance	JD Production
Jaket Biru	Arif Abdul Rahman	Ebby Saiful, Raja Nor Baizura, Isma Aliff, Rashidah Jaafar, Wann, Jamal Mohammad, Yazid Sabroni	Action / Crime	Arif Skop Productions
Juara	Yusof Kelana	Sidi Oraza, Juliza Adlizan, Salleh Yaacob	Action	
Kanta Serigala	Hussein Abu Hassan	Faizal Hussein, Didie Alias, Rosyam Nor, Jasmin Hamid, Melissa Saila, A. Rahim, Kamarool Yusof, Hussein Abu Hassan, Dilla Hussein	Thriller / Action	Panshah Film Production; Entered into the 1992 Asia Pacific Film Festival
Little Sinbad	Fuka Hanada	Ijoy Azahari		Japan-Malaysia co-production
Memori (Memory)	Rosnani Jamil	Jins Shamsuddin, Fauziah Ahmad Daud, Nash, Nazliah Hamid, Shahrulzaman, Herdawatie, Umie Aida	Drama	RJ Film
Naan Oru Malaysian	Suhan Panchacharam	Suhan Panchacharam, K. Gunasegaran, K. S. Maniam, Manivasan, Bairogi Narayanan	Romance	First Tamil-language film produced in Malaysia
O.C.J.: Operasi Cegah Jenayah	Eddie Pak	Hani Mohsin, Mustapha Kamal, Noralbaniah, Sabree Fadhil, Nancie Foo, Wendy Wong, Douglas Lim	Action, crime	Cinefame
Riang Tirana	Arief Karmahani	Erma Fatima, Badrul Muhayat, Karen Iskandar, Raja Azura, Azhar Sulaiman, Romzy	Romantic comedy	Fuego Production
Sejati	Norhan Mahmud	Jamal Abdillah, Raja Ema, Latiff Ibrahim, Noraini Hashim, Accapan, Din Glamor, Baharuddin Omar	Romantic drama	SV Productions
Suci Dalam Debu	Zulkeflie M. Osman	Julia Rais, Sidi Oraza, Imuda, Iklim	Romantic drama	Aarti Film
Syakila	Badaruddin Azmi	Kuza, Rahim Maarof, Aishah, Sani Sudin	Romantic drama	SJ Film Production
1992
Gelora Cinta	Aziz Sattar	Imuda, Nurul Ariffin, Noralbaniah	Romantic comedy	Indonesia-Malaysia co-production
Interlud	Othman Zainudin	Azhar Sulaiman, Louisa Chong, Sofia Jane, Wan Maimunah, Hisham Ahmad Tajudin, Esma Danial	Drama	United Kadila; Entered into the 1992 Asia Pacific Film Festival
Kelisa		Zulkifli Zain, Raisuddin Hamzah, Normala Omar, Malek Noor, Jacinta Lee, Shima, Mahiza Bakri, Ruzaidi	Action / Crime	
Nadia		Hani Mohsin, Julia Rais, Normah Damanhuri, Sofia Jane, Susan Lankester, Sulaiman Yassin (Mat Over), XPDC	Drama / Romance	
Queen Control	A. R. Badul	Raja Ema, Jalil Hamid, Lorna Abdullah, Noralbaniah, Sharifah Edora, Azmi Mohamad, Anita Sulaiman, Maria Farida, Zaibo (Zainal Ariffin), Jijoe, Aziz Sattar, Baharuddin Omar, Johan Abdullah, Maznah Ahmad	Comedy	FG Film Production
Rimba Malam	Zulkeflie M. Osman	Aida Rahim, Mustapha Kamal, Malek Noor, Latiff Ibrahim, Nanu Baharuddin, M. Osman, TS Jeffry	Drama	
Sahabat	Zulkeflie M. Osman	Mustapha Kamal, Raja Ema, Malek Noor, Accapan, Salleh Yaacob, Latiff Ibrahim, Din Glamour, Laila Nasir, TS Jeffry, Awang Buncit, Din Bagak, Rahman B, Azlan, Yunus Hamid, Ayie Rescue	Comedy / Action	SV Productions
Selubung (Veil of Life)	Shuhaimi Baba	M. Nasir, Deanna Yusoff, Ida Nerina, Harith Iskander, Liza Othman, Jit Murad, Hattan, Mahmud June, Sulina	Drama / Romance	Identity Entertainers; Entered into the 1997 Brussels International Independent Film Festival
Syahadat	Dzed Zahidin	Yusof Wahab, Eman Manan, Erma Fatima, Shukery Hashim, Mohammad Abdullah, Hamidah Wahab	Drama	Trademore; Entered into the 1992 Asia Pacific Film Festival
Wanita Bertudung Hitam (The Black-Veiled Woman)	Mahadi J. Murat	Ramona Rahman, Jalil Hamid, Zami Ismail, Mahmud June, Imuda, Yalal Chin, Kartina Aziz, Yusof Mohamad, Wan Maimunah, Romzi, Sabri Yunus	Drama	Teknik Suria
XX Ray	Aziz M. Osman	Aziz M. Osman, Faizal Hussein, Nor Aliah Lee, Sharmaine Farouk, Ibrahim Pendek, Edika Yusof, Bibiana Layola, Shaharuddin Thamby, Esma Daniel, Osman Kering, Ebby Yus, Jaafar Onn, Erma Fatima, Malek Noor	Adventure / Science fiction	Nizarman
Yang DiSayangi	Deddy M. Borhan	Tiara Jacquelina, Khairil Anwar, Ijoy Azahari, Maria Arshad, S. Sahlan, Shah Rezza, Mariani, Along Kamaruddin, Sahib Selamat		Sabah Film Production-Multi Enterprise
Penghujung Malam	Ahmadi Hassan	Khalid Salleh, Noorkumalasari, Melissa Saila, Hilal Azman, Latiff Borgiba, Yusni Jaafar, Rahim Jailani, Shaharon Anuar Abdul Latif	Drama / Family	
1993
Abang '92	Rahim Razali	Azhar Sulaiman, Deanna Yusoff, Rahim Razali, Zarul Albakri, Haliza Misbun, Mustapha Maarof	Drama / Family	ASA-XX Films Productions; Entered into the 1994 Pyongyang International Film Festival
Antara Gadis	Yuzwan Wahid	Yuzwan Wahid, Mas Anizan, Kamarool Yusof, Zarina Zainuddin, Wan Nor Azlin, Abu Bakar Omar	Drama / Romance	
Azizah - The Legend	Arief Karmahani	Badrul Muhayat, Wafa Abdul Kadir, Khalid Salleh, Rosnani Jamil, Ebby Saiful, Azreen, Sharifah Haslinda	Drama / Romance	Fuego Production; Entered into the 1997 Brussels International Independent Film Festival and 1994 Pyongyang International Film Festival
Balada	Jins Shamsuddin	M. Nasir, Fauziah Ahmad Daud, Jins Shamsuddin, Kuza, Yusof Haslam	Drama / Romance	Adek Film Production
Cikgu Romantik	Z. Lokman	Os, Raja Ema, Mustapha Kamal, Jasmin Hamid, Z. Lokman	Comedy / Romance	
Hanny		Ruhil Amani, Hani Mohsin, Maria Farida, Zarina Zainuddin	Drama / Romance	JD Production
Imigran	Nahar Akbar Khan, Badaruddin Azmi	Imuda, Nanu Baharuddin, Sabri Yunus, Ahmad Busu, Rambo Chin, Noraini Hashim, Goh Kim Hoe, Nina Juren, Ruhil Amani, Mahmud June, Sharifah Haslinda, Sharifah Shahirah, Rozi, Mohamad Ismail	Comedy / Romance	Excellent Venture
Kekasih Awal Dan Akhir	Zulkeflie M. Osman	Jamal Abdillah, Sofia Jane, Zizie Ezette, Cico Harahap, Imuda, Azwan Ali, Osman Zailani, Nor Aliah Lee, Rawi, Afida Es, R. Jaafar, Noralbaniah	Drama / Romance	Finartis Production
Ops Belantara (Operation Jungle Storm)	Rodzee Razak	Fauziah Ahmad Daud, Razman, Eman Manan, Lord Little Brooke	Action / Crime	Sunny Film Corporation
Pemburu Bayang (Shadow Chaser)	Yusof Haslam	Awie, Ella, Shaharuddin Thamby, Erma Fatima, Yusof Haslam, Raja Azura, Malek Noor, A. Galak, Joe Wings, Eddie Wings, Jojet, Roy Azman, Ali Bakar, Norshafina	Drama / Romance	Skop Productions
Perempuan, Isteri dan ...?	U-Wei Saari	Sofia Jane, Nasir Bilan Khan, Yusof Mohammad, Fetty Dzul, Normah Damanhuri, M. Rajoli, Jamaluddin Kadir, Hamidah Wahab, Zaidi Omar, Johari Yusuf, Rosni Yusuf, Fendy, Ali Osman, Sudiro Sukirman, Ismail Yaacob, Bibi Putri Zaitun, Alias Yusuf, Anwar Idris, Ramlee Saleh, Ahmad Bahiki, Kamarool Yusof, Bohari Ibrahim, Shamsul Kamal, Ku Mustapha, Syed Basil, Razali Safar, Mohd Rawi Said, Jaafar Wira, Sohara, Dalimawati Ismail, Sani Sudin, Dewa Sapri, Ali Rahman, Rohaya Rahman, Raja Hamidah	Drama	Berjaya Film Production; Entered into the 1994 Pyongyang International Film Festival
Sengketa Cinta	Sabree Fadhil	Sabree Fadhil, Noralbaniah, Os, Hussein Abu Hassan, Ira Faridah, Zamree, Rona Marlynda, Aynna Faridah	Drama / Romance	Ratu Dewi Bayu Communications
Tarik-Tarik	M. Jamil	Sarimah, Aziz Sattar, Raja Ema, Zarina Zainuddin, Jaafar Onn, Kuswadinata, Mohd Fildza, Kamal Reza, Norlia Ramli, Zara Ibrahim	Comedy / Mystery	MJSR Film Productions
1994
Black Window - Wajah Ayu (Black Widow - A Portrait of Ayu)	U-Wei Saari	Misbun Sidek, Hashimah Yon, Puteri Salbiah, Zaidi Omar, Nurul Jasmin, Mohd Rodzi, JD Khalid, Ahmad Bahiki, Rashid Sidek, Foo Kok Keong, Jalani Sidek	Drama	HW Entertainment Design & Production; Adapted from the novel Black Widow by Raja Azmi; Entered into the 1995 Singapore International Film Festival
Fantasi (Fantasy)	Aziz M. Osman	Erma Fatima, Faizal Hussein, Mustapha Kamal, Kuza, Melissa Saila, M. Osman, Shah Rahman, Alias Yusof, Sarip Noor, Zarina Zainuddin, JD Khalid, Nasir P. Ramlee, Razak Rahman, Zain Mahmood, Aziz M. Osman, TS Jeffry, Azman Monaliza, Mohana, Ali Mohammad, Safie Osman, Seripah Aminah	Thriller / Horror	Teletrade
Femina	Aziz M. Osman	Eman Manan, Erma Fatima, Susan Lankester, Azman Abu Hassan, Maria Farida, Sharifah Haslinda, Sarip Noor, Nor Aliah Lee, Din Glamour, Afida Es, Zulkeflie M. Osman, Z. Lokman	Comedy / Romance	SV Productions
Jeritan Batinku	Arief Shah	Aziz Jaafar, Rosnah Mat Aris, Normah Damanhuri, Noralbaniah, Puteri Normaria		Ariff Skop Production
Panggilan Pulau	Ahmad Fauzee	Ahmad Fauzee, Sharmaine Farouk, Lyana Sulaiman, Jalaluddin Hassan, Raisuddin Hamzah, Ariff S. Shamsuddin	Drama / Romance	Malay Film Productions; Remake of the 1954 film of the same name
Penyu	Z. Lokman	Yantzen May, R. Jaafar, Helmi Salleh, Susan Manen, Jaafar Onn, Abu May, Yus May, Man May, Z. Lokman, Wendy Lee, A. Aida, Jamie	Action / Comedy	Televisual-Penglipur Lara co-production Film set in the Philippines
Putera	Zulkeflie M. Osman	Joe Wings, Erma Fatima, Vanida Imran, Eddie Wings, Jojet, Lydiawati	Comedy / Romance	JD Production; Film set in England
Red Haired Tumbler di Malaya	Eddie Pak	Elaine Kang, Shima, Ahmad Fauzee, Ong Soo Han, Os, Corey Felino, Wilson Ting, Carol Low, Kang Qiao, Lim Wei Chin, Teddy Williams, Johan Abdullah, JN Bagley @ Johan, Batumalai, Miki	Action / Romance	Produksi Seni Duapuluh-Duapuluh
Sembilu	Yusof Haslam	Awie, Erra Fazira, Ziana Zain, Mustapha Kamal, Aida Rahim, Khairil Anwar, Alice Voon, Roy Azman, Noraini Hashim, Khairullah, Mercury	Drama / Romance	Skop Productions
Simfoni Duniaku	Aziz Sattar	M. Nasir, Fauziah Ahmad Daud, Norazah Aziz, Accapan, Aziz Sattar, Latiff Ibrahim, Normah Damanhuri, Hashim Abdul Rahman, Z. Lokman	Drama / Romance	SV Productions
Sofia-Jo	Sahib Selamat	Sharmaine Farouk, Faizal Hussein		Solid Gold Production
1995
Amok	Adman Salleh	Nasir Bilal Khan, Ramona Rahman, Hans Isaac, Rosnani Jamil, Yusof Mohammad	Drama	Nizarman-Grand Brilliance co-production Entered into the 1997 South-East Asian Biennial Film Festival, 1997 Singapore International Film Festival, 1998 Bangkok Film Festival, 1997 Hawaii International Film Festival
The Arsonist	U-Wei Haji Saari	Khalid Salleh, Ngasrizal Ngasri, Azizah Mahzan, Anwar Idris, Jamaluddin Kadir	Drama	Original title: Kaki Bakar; Screened at the 1995 Cannes Film Festival (Un Certain Regard section)
Awas	Abdul Aziz Razak	Norman KRU, Yusry KRU, Edry KRU, Linda Rafar, Liena Hangat, Edika Yusof, Jalaluddin Hassan	Drama / Romance	Medanmas; Indonesia-Malaysia co-production
Bisikan Cinta	Sahib Selamat	Azhar Sulaiman, Maria Farida, Accapan, Norlia Ghani, Hamidah Wahab	Comedy / Romance / Action	Grand Brilliance
Cinta Kita	Kamal Ishak	Sofia Jane, Aman Graseka, Fauzi Kamaruddin, Sharifah Shahirah, Ismail Hutson	Drama / Romance	Berjaya Film Production
Cinta Rosevilla		Shereen, Zami Ismail, Maria Kamal, Rosnani Jamil	Comedy / Romance	
Debu-Debu Kasih	Pansha	Sham Visa, Aida Aris, Raja Azura, Rosli Rahman Adam, Osman Zailani	Romance / Musical	Berjaya Film Production
Jimi Asmara	Erma Fatima	Hani Mohsin, Maizurah Hamzah, Jalaluddin Hassan, Rosyam Nor, Umie Aida	Romance / Musical	BNE Studio-Grand Brilliance co-production
Johnny Bikin Filem	Anuar Nor Arai	Zack Idris, Erma Fatima, Wafa Abdul Kadir, M. Amin, Jalaluddin Hassan	Drama	University of Malaya
Kad Cinta	Julie Dahlan	Nasha Aziz, Hairie Othman, Badrul Muhayat, Eizlan Yusof, Sham Visa	Drama / Romance	JD Productions
Pesona Cinta	Arief Karmahani	Shaharuddin Thamby, Ida Nerina, Nasir Bilan Khan, Linda Rafar, Badrul Muhayat	Drama / Romance	Medanmas
Ringgit Kasorga	Shuhaimi Baba	Deanna Yusoff, Tiara Jacquelina, Hans Isaac, Zaidi Omar, Hani Mohsin, Jalaluddin Hassan	Drama	Pesona Pictures-Mural Productions & Design co-production Entered into 1997 Brussels International Film Festival
Sama Tak Serupa	Zaaba Nordin	Affa Nico, Nico, Sasha Elite, Aznil Nawawi, Kuman (Bob KU2), Kumin	Comedy / Family	Daya Pentas
Sayang Salmah	Mahadi J. Murat	Sidi Oraza, Azhar Sulaiman, Norish Karman, Jalaluddin Hassan, Fauziah Nawi, Sofia Jane	Drama	Perkasa Filem; Entered into the 1996 Asia Pacific Film Festival, 2003 Kuala Lumpur World Film Festival, 1996 Singapore International Film Festival, 1997 Brussels International Film Festival
Sembilu II	Yusof Haslam	Awie, Erra Fazira, Ziana Zain, Mustapha Kamal, Khairil Anwar, Alice Voon, Noraini Hashim, Jojet, Khairullah, Zulkifli Khan, Mercury	Drama / Romance	Skop Productions-Grand Brilliance co-production Preceded by Sembilu (1994)
XX Ray II	Aziz M. Osman	Aziz M. Osman, Lydiawati, Ida Nerina, Jalaluddin Hassan, Osman Kering, Azmil Mustapha, Bonni Sta Maria, Aleeza Kassim, Razak Razman, Richard Law, Baharuddin Harun, Aishah Abdullah	Adventure / Science fiction	Nizarman-Grand Brilliance co-production
1996
Amelia	Rosnani Jamil	Joe Wings, Ruhil Amani, Azean Irdawaty, Eizlan Yusof, Jasmin Hamid, Aziz Singah, Ann Abdullah, Raja Nor Baizura, Hussein Abu Hassan, Salmah Ibrahim, Sazali Khan, Hamid Gurkha	Drama / Romance	RJ Film
Cinta Metropolitan	Zulkeflie M. Osman	Norman KRU, Yusry KRU, Edry KRU, Vanida Imran, Emylia Rosnaida, Jalaluddin Hassan, Noreen Noor, Sheila Mambo, Nana Nurgaya	Action / Romance	JD Production
Emas Melayu (Pure Gold)		Umie Aida, Hattan, David Chan	Action / Adventure	HW Entertainment
Impian	AR Sulaiman	Amy Mastura, Azhar Sulaiman, Aziz Singah, Rosnah Mat Aris, Hamid Gurkha, Riezman	Drama / Romance	
Kecil-Kecil Cili Api	Jamil Sulong	Zulkifli Zain, Watie Res 2, Umie Res 2, Amirul Nizam	Comedy / Family	RJ Film
Litar Kasih	Eddie Pak	Azhar Sulaiman, Linda Rafar, Faizal Hussein, Kazar, Mek Habsah, Aishah Atan, Rambo Chin, Liza Abdul Latiff	Drama / Action	United Movie
Lurah Dendam (Valley Of Vengeance)	Raja Ahmad Alauddin	Redzuan Hashim, Raja Azura, Eizlan Yusof, Chef Wan, Janet Khoo, Onie Hartina, TS Jeffry	Action / Adventure	Grand Brilliance
Maria Mariana	Yusof Haslam	Erra Fazira, Ziana Zain, Edika Yusof, Roy Azman, Noraini Hashim, Kenji Lim, A. Galak, Shaharon Anuar, Jesslyn, TS Jeffry, Aziz Singah	Action / Romance	Grand Brilliance-Skop Productions co-production
Scoop	Aziz M. Osman	Hans Isaac, Haliza Misbun, Azman Abu Hassan, Zulkifli Zain, Hani Mohsin, Redzuan Hashim, M. Osman, Shah Rahman, Murad Ibrahim, Irene Santiago, Syed Azidi Aziz, Nor Aliah Lee	Comedy / Crime	Penglipur Lara
Siapa Dia?	NT Wong	Faizal Hussein, Nina Juren, Sidi Oraza, Zaza Ahmad, Frankie Chan, Vincent, Tamam Idris, Norlia Ghani	Comedy / Action	
Suami, Isteri dan ...?	Pansha	Rosyam Nor, Lydiawati, Sheila Rusly, TS Jeffry, Kumin, Aziz Sattar, Hussein Abu Hassan, R. Jaafar, Jaafar Onn, Aishah Abdullah, Erna, Laila Rahila, Murugesu, Perumal, Zulhainor, Lan Zahlan, Megat Adnan	Comedy / Romance	Berjaya Film Production
SuperStar	Z. Lokman	Joe Wings, Sasha Elite, Imuda, Noralbaniah, Sham Visa	Comedy	
Suratan Kasih (The Fate of Love)	Zulkeflie M. Osman	Jamal Abdillah, Sofia Jane, Jalaluddin Hassan, Osman Zailani, Aida Aris, Zaidi Rock, Accapan, Dol	Romance / Thriller	SV Productions
Sutera Putih (White Silk)	Rashid Sibir	Shima, Bonnie Sta Maria, Susan Lankester, Mustapha Maarof, Azean Irdawaty, Zahim Albakri, Hairie Othman, Sharifah Haslinda, Zaidi Rock, Effa Ismail	Drama / Romance	Grand Brilliance-Azmah Advertising co-production
Tragedi Oktober (October Tragedy)	Yusof Kelana	Awie, Erra Fazira, Amy Mastura, Riezman	Drama / Romance	ME Communications-Skop Productions co-production Preceded by Sembilu (1994) and Sembilu II (1995)
Yes, Tuan!		Sabri Yunus, Bob Lokman, Tasha, Dian P. Ramlee, Khatijah Tan, Angeline Tan	Comedy / Family	Feugo Production
1997
Azam	Z. Lokman	Shaharuddin Thamby, Wan Nor Azlin, Sharifah Shahirah, Zaidi Omar, Abu Bakar Omar, Normah Damanhuri, Ebby Yus, Azza Elite	Drama / Action	Grand Brilliance
Baginda	Aziz M. Osman	Azean Irdawaty, Jalil Hamid, Jalaluddin Hassan, Chef Wan, Louisa Chong, Jaafar Onn, Benjy, Dilla Ahmad	Drama / Comedy	Grand Brilliance-Paradigm Film co-production
Gemerlapan	A. Razak Mohaideen	Baby Res 2, Lan A to Z, Maya, Umie Res 2, Sham Visa, Kuman (Bob KU2), Eisya, Azean Irdawaty, Ismail Din, Shafi Khan, Kartina Aziz, Jaafar Onn, Zami Ismail, Nasriah Ngasri, Amir & Group	Comedy	Grand Brilliance
Gemilang	Yusof Haslam	Erra Fazira, Hans Isaac, Ning Baizura, Jalaluddin Hassan, Roy Azman, A. Galak, Shaharon Anuar, Yang Kassim, Latiff Borgiba, Mercury	Romance / Thriller	Skop Productions
Ghazal Untuk Rabiah	Nagaraj	Jamal Abdillah, Wilma Muhammad, Redzuan Hashim, Raja Azura, Os, Noraini Kadir	Drama / Romance	SV Production
Hanya Kawan (Just Friends)	Harith Iskander	Hans Isaac, Ella, Harith Iskander, Jojie, Bonnie Sta Maria, Korie, Bernie Chan, Ramona Rahman, Azmil Mustapha	Drama / Romance	Nizarman
Layar Lara (Sails of Despair)	Shuhaimi Baba	Ida Nerina, Sidi Oraza, Azean Irdawaty, Man Bai, Maman, Kavita Sidhu, Melissa Saila, Shazleen Shahbi, Ruzaimi Aziz, Ismail Hutson, Roslan Hussin, Salmah Mahmud, Aziz Jaafar, Mahmood June, Aziz Sattar, Siput Sarawak	Drama	Astro-Pesona Pictures co-production Entered into the 1997 Brussels International Independent Film Festival, 1998 Pyongyang International Film Festival, 1997 Hawaii International Film Festival, 1998 New Delhi International Film Festival
Merah	M. Nasir	Awie, Ziana Zain, M. Nasir, Hani Mohsin, Razzi Rahman, Jojet, Sani Sudin, Kamarool Yusof, Arash, Suhaina Yahya, Ishak Raja Etam, Jalaluddin Hassan, Orkid Abdullah, Nico, Affa Nico, Joey, Zakaria Yusuf	Action / Romance	Luncai Emas; Entered into the 1997 East Asia Film and Television Festival
Puteri Impian (Dream Princess)	Aziz M. Osman	Amy Mastura, Hairie Othman, Cico Harahap, Nor Aliah Lee, Kuman (Bob KU2), Dilla Ahmad, Azwan Ali, Sophia Ibrahim	Comedy / Romance	Grand Brilliance
Sate	Z. Lokman	Nurul, Faizal Hussein, Hairie Othman, Liena Hangat, Rashidah Jaafar, Rosli Rahman Adam, Noraini Hashim, Aziz Singah, Osman Zailani, Zila Bakarin, Mario Blackrose, Shahrin Blackrose, Slam	Comedy / Romance	Grand Brilliance
1998
Badai Mantera	Zulkeflie M. Osman	Khairil Anwar, Vanida Imran, M. Rajoli, Sharifah Haslinda, Ahmad Merbawi, Kamarool Yusof, Rosnah Manap, Dol Baser, Syaiful Anuar, Zaidi Rock, M. Amin	Action / Adventure	Grand Brilliance
Gado-Gado Unplugged	Anwardi Jamil	Hamid Gurkha, Ebby Saiful, Sheila Rusly, Isma Aliff, Den Wahab, Jalil Hamid, Imuda, Kuman, Herdawatie	Comedy	Lagenda Abadi
Iman Alone	Rahim Razali	Azmil Mustapha, Norish Karman, Iwan Nasir, Tengku Iedilzuhrie, Jalaluddin Hassan, Mustapha Maarof, Sophia Ibrahim, Tang Ting, Soosan Hoh, Amyza Adnan, Azri Iskandar, Raja Nor Baizura, Osman Zailani, Roslan Ahmad, Shades	Drama / Family	ASA-XX Films Productions
Jibon	Nahar Akhbar Khan	Along Kamaruddin, Melissa Saila, Mohd Zafrie Ikmal, Ruzaidi, Aziz Sattar, Farid Amirul, Mat Sentol, Din Glamour, Nora Ramli		Grand Brilliance
Kembara	AR Sulaiman	Nina Juren, Imuda, Aida Aris, Riezman Khuzaimi, Shahrul Nizam Arifin, Suzliana Saini, Halissa Halim, Jaafar Wira, Dharma Harun	Comedy / Adventure	Solid Gold Publishers
Lenjan	Ismail Yaacob	Eman Manan, Nina Juren, Rosyam Nor, Pansha, Shamsul Baharin, Haryaty Ramli, Shanoor Shahib, Shaza Nor, Rita Andrea, Shasha Yusuf, Syed Bakar Yusuf	Thriller	Berjaya Film Production; Entered into the 1999 Asia Pacific Film Festival, 2000 Pyongyang International Film Festival
Maria Mariana II	Yusof Haslam	Erra Fazira, Ziana Zain, Awie, Ning Baizura, Rosyam Nor, Roy Azman, Jesslyn, Noraini Hashim, Shaharon Anuar	Action / Romance	Grand Brilliance-Skop Productions co-production Preceded by Maria Mariana (1996)
Panas	Nurhalim Ismail	Aleeza Kassim, Eizlan Yusof, Yusof Mohammad, Abon, Omar Abdullah, Normala Omar, SA Bakar, Roschik, Sara	Drama	Nur TV Production-Take One Production co-production Entered into the 1998 Asia Pacific Film Festival
Penyair Malam	Kamal Ishak	Zack Idris, Yasmin Suraya, Aman Graseka, Sheila Mambo, Ismail Din, Ahmad Tarmimi Serigar, Hairul Rickyno, Giegie	Drama / Romance	Grand Brilliance
Puteri Impian 2 (Dream Princess 2)	Aziz M. Osman	Amy Mastura, Cico Harahap, Nor Aliah Lee, Azri Iskandar, Sarimah Ibrahim, Erma Fatima, Azman Abu Hassan, Aziz M. Osman	Comedy / Romance	Paradigm Film-Grand Brilliance co-production Preceded by Puteri Impian (1997)
Raja Melewar	Jamil Sulong	Eizlan Yusof, Shaharuddin Thamby, Aziz Jaafar, Rosnani Jamil, Norish Karman, Muhamad Rashdan, Dewi Melina Emil, Sesti Dewi, Anne Hamid, Thopatalam Ali, Hengky Darmady, Rahim B, Kuman, Osman Kering, Jamal Mohamad, B. Hr. Tanjung, Armely Firdaus, Zainal Basri, Yan Abdullah, Mus Lakon, Alwi Karmena, Mustafa Ibrahim, Elly Radjilis, Irwandhi Azwar, Andrea Adrian, Joss Habib, JD Khalid, Abd Razak Abd Rahman, Lebai Omar, Zainab Othman, Ahmad Merbawi, Karim A. Latiff, Mohd Salehan Razak, Ishak Mohamad, Aziz Md Saad, Mahadi Amin, Farouk Mohd Haniff	Drama / Historical	Film Master; Entered into the 1998 Asia Pacific Film Festival
Silat Legenda	Hassan Muthalib	Noorkumalasari, Karim Latiff, Othman Hafsham, M. Amin, Ayie Ibrahim, Kamal Effendi Md. Kamal, Mohd Rizal Karman, Rafidei Mohamad, Sham Yunus, Nurul Alis, Hamid Gurkha, Ahmad Nizam, Puteri Nor, Jalaluddin Hassan, Razali Buyong, Ismail Din, Ramli Abu Bakar, Farid Amirul Hisham, Siti Nurbaya Ahmadiah	Fantasy	Peninsula Pictures; First feature-length animated film produced in Malaysia
1999
Bara	Yusof Haslam	Awie, Nasha Aziz, Rosyam Nor, Zamani Slam, Arni Nazira, Ning Baizura, Azza Elite, A. Galak, Raja Nor Baizura, Farid Amirul, Yang Kassim, Shaharon Anuar, Jojet, Deen Maideen, Riezman, Wendy Wong, Majed Salleh, AC Mizal	Action / Romance	Grand Brilliance-Skop Productions co-production Entered into the 2000 Asia Pacific Film Festival
Burung Besi	Badaruddin Azmi	Azean Irdawaty, Shahrul Nizam, Noraini Morat, Hairul Rickyno	Action / Comedy	Grand Brilliance
Jogho	U-Wei Saari	Khalid Salleh, Normah Damanhuri, Adlin Aman Ramli, Baharuddin Omar, Ijoy Azahari, Sabri Yunus, Normala Omar, Aznah Hamid, Liza Rafar	Drama	Gambar Tanah Licin-NHK Japan co-production Adapted from the novel Juara by S. Othman Kelantan; Entered into the 1998 Asia Pacific Film Festival, 1998 Singapore International Film Festival, 1999 Jakarta International Film Festival, 1997 Tokyo International Film Festival, 1998 Pusan International Film Festival, 1998 Pyongyang International Film Festival
K.L.U. (Kuala Lumpur University)	Ricky Uy	Azhar Sulaiman, Amy Mastura, Nana Nurgaya, Susan Manen, Nina Juren, Kuswadinata, Johan Ariff, Jai Johari, Ahmad Idham	Comedy / Romance	
Nafas Cinta (Breath of Love)	Jailani Ghani	Awie, Maizurah Hamzah, Norman Hakim, Arni Nazira, Rosyam Nor, Jalaluddin Hassan, Kamalia Mat Dom	Drama / Romance	Astro Shaw; Entered into the 1999 Asia Pacific Film Festival
Perempuan Melayu Terakhir (The Last Malay Woman)	Erma Fatima	Vanida Imran, Eizlan Yusof, Ahmad Yatim, Azri Iskandar, Nanu Baharuddin, M. Nasir, Tiara Jacquelina, Jit Murad, Zahim Albakri	Drama / Romance	BNE Studio-Grand Brilliance co-production Entered into the 2000 Pyongyang International Film Festival, 1998 Asia Pacific Film Festival, 1999 Singapore International Film Festival, 1999 Jakarta International Film Festival, 2000 India International Film Festival
Senario The Movie	Aziz M. Osman	Wahid, Azlee, Mazlan, Saiful Apek, Shamsul Ghau Ghau, Syanie, A. R. Badul, Zahida Rafik, Anne Hamid, Hamid Gurkha, Yahya Sulong, Yusni Jaafar, Rashidi Ishak, Ako Mustapha, Zaidi Rock, Aziz M. Osman	Comedy	Paradigm Film-Grand Brilliance co-production
1990s
Pretty Girls		Sofea Jane, Badrul Muhayat		Japan-Malaysia co-production
Thermometer 3		Zarina Zainuddin, Melissa Saila, Nor Aliah Lee		
