= Zombi Kampung Pisang =

- Directed by: Mamat Khalid
- Written by: Mamat Khalid
- Screenplay by: Mamat Khalid
- Produced by: Gayatri Su-Lin Pillai
- Starring: Awie; Ezlynn; Que Haidar; AC Mizal
- Cinematography: Khalid Zakaria
- Edited by: Zappa Khalid
- Production company: Tayangan Unggul
- Distributed by: Astro Shaw
- Release date: 19 April 2007 (Malaysia)
- Running time: 85 minutes
- Country: Malaysia
- Language: Malay
- Budget: MYR 1.23 million
- Box office: MYR 2.37 million

Zombi Kampung Pisang (English: Kampung Pisang's Zombies) is a 2007 Malaysian Malay-language horror comedy film directed by Mamat Khalid. The whole story happens in one night, taking place in a village named Kampung Pisang ("Banana Village" in Malay) and its surroundings. (The dialect used by the characters suggests that the village is located somewhere in rural Perak - the director himself hails from this state.)

== Plot ==
The story begins when Husin is approached by a few village boys on his way home, inviting him to join them during their guitar playing sessions. Husin decides to join them. Eventually, they are spotted and scolded by an elder named Pak Abu, who is returning home from the mosque after the Isyak prayers.

Halfway through his scolding, Pak Abu suddenly freezes and falls. At that moment, Husin and the other boys carry Pak Abu home. Mat Karen calls the village head to Pak Abu's house. Chaos ensues when Pak Jabit, the village head, also collapses. They then decide to call the village's medical assistant, Sofi. Sofi examines both Pak Abu and Pak Jabit and declares them both dead. While they discuss what happened, Pak Abu's daughter, Muna, screams in horror—somehow, the bodies of Pak Abu and Pak Jabit have disappeared.

Shocked by the incident, Husin and Sofi rush to their community center and drum on the old bedok to gather the villagers. After informing the villagers of these events, some begin to speculate about the paranormal activities that might be occurring around them. Their fears soon become a reality: zombies start to appear all across the village, leading to hilarious encounters for the victims.

== Cast ==
- Awie as Husin
- Ezlynn as Maimon
- Que Haidar as Deris
- AC Mizal as Mat Karan
- Soffi Jikan as Sofi
- Hamid Gurkha as Pak Mail
- Nadia Mustafar as Munah
- Man Kadir as Pak Jabit
- Zami Ismail as Pak Abu
- Ruminah Sidek as Mak Som Jamaliah
- Usop Wilcha as Usop
- Lan Pet Pet as Inspector Cenehom
- Loloq as A. Kamsan
- Jalil Hamid as Pak Munawir
- Dewa Sapri as Cik Purnama
- Ilya Buang as Konstabel Fauzi/Pian RELA
- Ajak Melissa as Pian Pehot
- Elly Sarimah as Puspa
- Adam Khalid as Adam
- Hamdan Ramli as Chief District of Police
- Mamat Khalid as MK (special appearance)

== Reception ==
A critic from mStar wrote that although the backstory of the characters in Zombi Kampung Pisang is very loose, the storytelling style from point A to Z is very easy to follow.

== Sequels ==
- Hantu Kak Limah Balik Rumah (2010)
- Hantu Kak Limah: Husin, Mon dan Jin Pakai Toncit (2013)
- Zombie Kilang Biskut (2014)
- Hantu Kak Limah (2018)
