= Tragedi Oktober =

- VCD cover
- Directed by: Yusof Kelana
- Written by: Yusof Haslam
- Produced by: Yusof Haslam; Fetty Ismail; Yusof Kelana
- Starring: Awie; Erra Fazira; Amy Mastura
- Cinematography: Johan Ibrahim
- Edited by: Salehan Samsuddin
- Music by: Johari Teh
- Production company: ME Communications Sdn Bhd
- Distributed by: Scope of Productions
- Release date: 1996
- Running time: 104 minutes
- Country: Malaysia
- Language: Malay

Tragedi Oktober (transl. October Tragedy) is a 1996 Malaysian Malay-language romantic drama film directed by Yusof Kelana, written by Yusof Haslam and starring Awie, Erra Fazira and Amy Mastura. The film is a sequel to Sembilu II (1995) and the third film in the Sembilu film series.

== Plot ==
Wati and Shamsul have been married for six years and they have a child, Shamin. Awie, Wati's ex-lover, even though six years have passed, is still looking for a girl who can truly fill the emptiness in his heart. However, the appearance of Farah, the daughter of a tycoon, has given Awie a new lease of life.

Meanwhile, the happiness of Wati and her husband Shamsul does not last long as a tragedy befalls her husband in October. Wati then lives as a widow with her child. An unexpected meeting between Awie and Wati at a party causes nostalgia between them. Wati cannot accept Awie's presence because she already thinks Awie is no longer in her life.

Awie, on the other hand, is only sympathetic to the fate of Wati and her son, Shamin. Time passes so quickly, the warmth that has blossomed between them causes tension in the relationship between Awie and Farah. Farah thinks Wati is trying to take Awie back from her. Awie decided to get engaged to Farah, and at the same time gave her his trust and honesty. However, it doesn't end there. Farah wanted to make sure that Wati didn't interfere with her life and didn't exist between her and Awie. Finally, another heartbreaking tragedy occurs in October.

== Cast ==
- Awie as Awie
- Erra Fazira as Wati
- Amy Mastura as Farah
- Riezman Khuzaimi as Shamsul
- Izni Fatin as Shamin
- Rosnah Mat Aris as Farah's mother
- Alice Voon as Alice
- Wan Maimunah
- Hairie Othman as Razman
- Jojet as Jojet
- Majed Salleh as Manager of BMG Music Malaysia recording company

== Themes and influences ==
The film is thematically similar to Yusof Haslam's previous works in terms of connecting emotionally:

1. character introductions that relate to the audience
2. transitions into a melancholic mood, taking advantage of the audience's sensitivity

== Soundtrack ==
The soundtrack of the film includes the titular track, which was first featured in the album Awie (1994).

== Reception ==
Zieman of The New Straits Times praised the work of the director and lead cast and wrote, "This is probably the only local movie that is able to stretch to three parts and not bore you".
