= Hasmiza Othman =

Malaysian businessperson

Vida SSAP (Pahang)
- Born: Hasmiza binti Othman; October 24, 1971 (age 55); Machang, Kelantan, Malaysia
- Other names: Dato' Sri Vida, DSV
- Education: Universiti Sains Malaysia (BA)
- Occupations: Businesswoman, television host, actress, singer
- Years active: 2015–present
- Known for: Founder of Vida Beauty, "I Am Me" viral video
- Spouses: Mohd Amin Yasin (m. 2000; div. 2008) Azid Hamzah (m. 2014; div. 2014) Fairuz Ahmad Zainuddin (m. 2014; div. 2017)
- Website: shopvidabeauty.com

Hasmiza Othman, more commonly known as Dato’ Sri Vida (sometimes abbreviated to DSV; born 24 October 1971) is a Malaysian entrepreneur, talkshow host, actor and singer from Kelantan. She received the Sri Sultan Ahmad Shah Pahang (SSAP) award, which carries the title Dato' Sri. The honour was conferred to her by then Crown Prince of Pahang, Tengku Abdullah Sultan Ahmad Shah on 24 October 2014.

On 24 July 2017, she released her single titled "I Am Me" which was composed and written by Edry Abdul Halim from KRU. The music video went viral on the Internet after reaching more than 50,000 views after it was uploaded to YouTube in the span of 2 minutes.

== Personal life ==
In her youth, she experienced financial difficulties after her father died when she was 9. In school, she sold legumes and packed rice meals to support her family. She pursued a degree in education and majored in Malay Literature and History while selling crisps to obtain pocket money.

== Business career ==
After graduating, she became a teacher but her desire in business led to her enrolling in a grooming course to open a business in beauty and grooming. She took a bank loan of RM100,000 to build up her beauty salon, in which she also experimented on her own cosmetic product. After garnering attention from customers, it led to the creation of Vida Beauty.

== Controversies ==
In October 2023, the Kuala Lumpur High Court ordered Hasmiza to settle a debt of RM1.06 million to AH Design Communication Sdn Bhd, a subcontractor for renovations done in 2018. After she failed to comply with the court order, four of her luxury vehicles and 727 of personal items were seized from her bungalow in Ipoh on 25 November 2024. The auction of the seized assets was scheduled for 30 October 2025.

== Discography ==
Single
| Year | Title | Notes |
|---|---|---|
| 2017 | "I Am Me" | |
| 2022 | "Ku Ikhlaskan" | |
| 2022 | "Muah Muah Raya" | |

== Filmography ==
=== Film ===
| Year | Title | Role | Notes |
|---|---|---|---|
| 2018 | Hantu Kak Limah | As herself | First film, special appearance |
| 2023 | Gui | Aripah | |

=== Television ===
| Year | Title | As | Channel | Notes |
|---|---|---|---|---|
| 2015 | Betul ke Bohong? (Season 7) | Invited artist | Astro Warna | Episode 1 |
| 2016 | Betul ke Bohong Sayang? (Season 8) | Group couple | Astro Warna | Episode 11 (Final quarter) |
| 2016 | Sepahtu Reunion Live 2016 | Mak Arba'a, Arba'i & Din | Astro Warna | Cameo: Episode "Samseng Kampung Cherry" |
| 2021 | Sepahtu Reunion Live 2021 | Lawyer | Astro Warna | Cameo: Episode "Kerana Hati Mati" |

== Awards and honours ==
- Pahang
  - Order of Sultan Ahmad Shah of Pahang - Grand Knight (SSAP), conferring the title Dato' Sri (2014)
