= Liyana Jasmay =

Malaysian actress, singer, producer and director

- ليانة جسمي
- Born: Liyana binti Jasmay; 28 March 1988 (age 38); Kuantan, Pahang, Malaysia
- Other names: LJ, Nana
- Occupations: Actress, singer, producer, director, screenwriter
- Years active: 1997–present
- Spouse: Fathuddin Mazlan (m. 2013)
- Children: 2
- Musical career
- Genres: Pop, R&B, pop rock
- Instrument: Vocals
- Years active: 2009–present
- Label: Mermaid Studios

Liyana binti Jasmay (born 28 March 1988) is a Malaysian actress, singer, producer and director.

== Career ==
Jasmay's first acting role came in 1997 when she was only nine years old in a TV drama called Si Lembik. The story is similar to the Hollywood film The Little Rascals, where little kids play the roles of adults. It was produced and directed by Aznil Hj Nawawi.

Over the years, Jasmay has made herself a household name by acting in numerous TV drama and TV series including Dendam Terlerai, Balqis, Orang Kasar, Cinta Sempadan, Najwa, and Cinta Si Rempit.

She then made her first silver-screen role in a highly promoted film Castello, where she starred alongside Rosyam Nor. The role earned Jasmay her first Malaysian Film Festival 2006 nomination for the Best New Actress Award.

Her career soared and she won a Best Actress Award for Malaysian Film Festival 2009 for her role in the film Papadom and a Best Actress Award for her role in an indie-gone-mainstream film KAMI.

Jasmay directed and produced a telemovie entitled #SoKampung under her production company, Mermaid Studios, thus marking her directorial debut. This was followed by a teen drama The Gadis.

== Personal life ==
Jasmay married her longtime love, Malaysian businessman Fathuddin Mazlan, on 2 February 2013. They have two daughters, born in 2014 and 2016.

Liyana's father, Jasmay Md Shah died in December 2021 due to lung cancer. This was followed by her mother, Habsah Simpon died in May 2023 due to lymphomal cancer.

Following her parents' death, Liyana expresses her concern that due to genetical factors, she would have a risk to get cancer in an interview with Malaysian newspaper, Kosmo!: "What happened to my parents became a lesson for me since both of them died due to cancer [...] So my genetics are indeed at risk for cancer".

== Academics ==
In 2012, Jasmay went to Manhattan, New York City, undergoing acting and screenwriting/directing courses in New York Film Academy for six months, accompanied by her mother. She is a graduate of Diploma of Performance Art and Media from Sunway University.

== Endorsements ==
Jasmay was the Malaysian Ambassador for Maybelline in 2009 and held the role for three years. She has been the Ambassador for ASAP Smoke Free Lifestyle Campaign since 2011.

== Filmography ==
=== Film ===
Year	Title	Role	Notes
2006	Castello	Phim	Film debut
2007	Syaitan	Ana	
2008	Histeria	Murni	
2008	KAMI The Movie	Lynn	
2009	Maut	Sue	
2009	Papadom	Miasara Saadom	
2009	Pisau Cukur	Suri Datuk Zakaria Hitam	
2009	Duhai Si Pari-Pari	Pari	
2010	Niyang Rapik	Laila	
2011	Khurafat: Perjanjian Syaitan	Aisyah	
2011	Senjakala	Kharlisa	
2011	Tolong! Awek Aku Pontianak	Liyana / Pontianak	
2011	Misteri Jalan Lama	Nina	Special appearance
2013	Papadom 2	Miasara Saadom	
2013	Tokan	Suri	
2013	Chikaro	Herself	Special appearance
2015	Isyarat Cinta	Dhia	
2017	Sindiket	Noreen	
2019	Bella & Jamie	Jamie	As screenwriter and co-producer
2022	Cinta VS Hantu	—	As director
2024	Harimau Malaya: The Untold Journey	Ana	As co-director
2024	Baik Punya Ah Long	Cik Pa	

=== Television series ===
Year	Title	Role	TV channel	Notes
1997	Si Lembik		TV3	
2007	KAMI The Series	Lynn	8TV	
2008	Puaka Niyang Rapik	Wirna	TV3	
2010	Ponti Anak Remaja	Siti Nur Ponti	Astro Ria	Mini Series
2012	3 Janji	Dalia	TV3	
2013	Sahabat	Haneez	Astro Ria	
2019	Cikgu Papa Kirim Salam	Cikgu Siti Munirah	TV3	
2020	Kau Perempuan Itu	Sarah	TV1	
2020	The Gadis	—	TV3	As director and producer
2022	Life Lila	—	TV3	As director
2022	Histeria The Series	Murni	Astro Citra	
2023	Alter-Naratif	Aira Kamal	Viu	
2023	Alice Kampung Baru	—	tonton	As director
2024	Nafsu	Bella	Viu	

=== Telemovie ===
Year	Title	Role	TV channel	Notes
2003	Najwa	Najwa	VCD	
2003	Orang Kasar		VCD	
2004	Cinta Sempadan		Astro Ria	
2007	Cinta Si Rempit		TV3	
2009	Laila Sari	Laila Sari	Astro Ria	
2010	Ponti Anak Remaja	Siti Nur Ponti	Astro Ria	
2011	Si Tudung Tweet	Zubaidah	TV9	
2013	New York Cinta	Mia	Astro First Exclusive	
2014	Bila Kau Datang		Astro Ria	
2015	Cik Paris Diva Kampung	Zulaikha	Astro Prima	
2015	Mama Zoomba	Lena	Astro Ria	
2016	Aku dan Adik	Ira	TV9	As producer
2016	Angin Cinta	—	Astro First Exclusive	As producer
2018	Studio Awie	Mawar	TV3	
2018	Manipulasi	Nita	TV3	
2018	Haji Gugel	Damia	TV3	
2018	Vivi Si Perigi	Vivi	NTV7	
2020	#So Kampung	—	TV3	As director
2020	10 Malam Terakhir		TV Okey	
2022	Doktor Idaman	—	TV3	As director
2023	Dalang	Ayu	tonton	
2025	11 Cinta Sebelum Kamu	Aisha	Sensasi	

=== Television ===
Year	Title	Role	TV channel	Notes
2017	Air Tangan Bonda	Herself (guest)	Astro Maya HD	as a guest with mother

=== Music videos ===
Year	Song title	Artist
2012	Oh My English! OST	Liyana Jasmay & Altimet

== Discography ==
- LJ (2009)

=== Singles ===
Year	Title	Notes
2009	Aku Tak Percaya Cinta	
2009	Aku Jatuh Cinta	
2012	Cinta Bersatu	
2016	Oh Na Na	
2016	Selesa Tanpamu	
2016	Jujur	
