= Cuci (film) =

- Directed by: Hans Isaac
- Produced by: Tony Fernandes; Hans Isaac
- Starring: Awie; Afdlin Shauki; AC Mizal; Hans Isaac; Erra Fazira; Umie Aida
- Distributed by: Grand Brilliance Sdn Bhd
- Release date: 28 January 2008 (Malaysia)
- Running time: 101 minutes
- Country: Malaysia
- Language: Malay

Cuci (English: Wash) is a 2008 Malaysian Malay-language comedy film starring and directed by Hans Isaac in his directorial debut. This also stars Awie, Afdlin Shauki, AC Mizal, Erra Fazira and Umie Aida. The film was released on 28 January 2008.

== Plot ==
The story is about four brothers who are window washers from Kuala Selangor who strive for something more in their lives. They find out the existence of a Window Washing Olympics with the grand prize of a contract to wash the Petronas Towers in Kuala Lumpur. As they fight through the Olympics along with other more organised and professional teams, they realise that nothing is more important than their brotherhood and friendship.

== Cast ==
- Afdlin Shauki as Fairil
- AC Mizal as C' Tan
- Awie as Jojo
- Hans Isaac as Khai
- Umie Aida as Kalsum Farah
- Erra Fazira as CJ
- Rahim Razali as Tan Sri
- Khir Rahman as Wira
- Muhamad Hakiim Abdul Raouf as Jojo (Kecil)
- Naim Daniel as Khai (Kecil)
- Muhamad Kamil Abdul Raouf as C'Tan (Kecil)

=== Special appearances ===
- Maimon Mutalib as Tok bi
- Yusni Jaafar as Kalsum Farah Mom
- Indi Nadarajah as Mr Leong
- Harun Salim Bachik as Janitor
- Ida Nerina as caretaker
- Syanie as Fairil Replacement
- Ako Mustapha as blind man
- Que Haidar as singer
- Rusdi Ramli as medicine seller
- Elaine Daly as stewardess
- Harith Iskander as David

== Reception ==
The film performed well at the box office, being second in Malaysia behind John Rambo.
