= Ponti Anak Remaja =

Malaysian television miniseries

- Also known as: Ponti: The Teenage Vampire
- Genre: Supernatural drama Teen fiction Dark comedy
- Created by: Nizam Zakaria
- Starring: Liyana Jasmay; Lisa Surihani; Tam Suhaimi; Nazim Othman; Azlee Khairi; Amran Ismail; Fimie Don; Elliza Razak; Aishah Hoo; Adam Faiz
- Opening theme: "Selamat Malam" by Faizal Tahir
- Composers: Audi Mok and Faizal Tahir
- Country of origin: Malaysia
- Original language: Malay

Production
- Producer: Ghaz Abu Bakar

Ponti Anak Remaja (2010) is a Malaysian miniseries about a half-vampire half-human teenage girl named Ponti and her attempts to integrate into the "real world." She is fascinated with the human world after she met a group of college students doing a research of a mythical flower in a local reserved forest which is actually inhabited by the vampires. She became friends with the students. They manage to somehow enroll her in the college, and unlike any other normal human, she has the ability to learn fast and other few super abilities.

Ponti herself is a bubbly, fun, energetic and friendly girl who just wants to fit in the social. She started dating Hazuan, the popular guy. Hazuan's ex-girlfriend Sofea became furious and hated this so she planned to make Ponti's life a living hell. Ponti also has to face Kamal, her vampire ex-boyfriend who would do anything to win her back.

The show began airing on October 25, 2010.

== See also ==
- Vampire film
- List of vampire television series
