= Kami (2008 film) =

- Theatrical release poster
- Directed by: Effendee Mazlan; Fariza Azlina Isahak
- Written by: Fariza Azlina Isahak
- Produced by: Lina Tan
- Starring: Liyana Jasmay; Syarul Ezani; Nas-T; Ani Zayanah Ibrahim; Juliana Sophie Evans; Zahiril Adzim
- Distributed by: Grand Brilliance
- Release date: 1 October 2008
- Running time: 100 minutes
- Country: Malaysia
- Language: Malay
- Budget: MYR 1.4 million
- Box office: MYR 1,245,000

Kami The Movie (English: We The Movie) is a 2008 Malaysian Malay-language coming-of-age drama film directed by Effendee Mazlan and Fariza Azlina Isahak. It was first released on 1 October 2008. The story revolves around the ups and downs of the life of five teenagers and how they cope with their surroundings.

== Plot ==
The film begins following the finale of the TV series which revolves around a group of five teenagers from different backgrounds and how they cope with everyday struggles of growing up in the big city of Kuala Lumpur which struggles to remain conservative in the progressive 21st century. Abu runs away from the Henry Gurney School juvenile facility after getting into a fight with other inmates. He is then reunited with his four best friends, Ali, Lynn, Addi and Sophie who are celebrating the completion of their Sijil Pelajaran Malaysia public examination that marks the end of their school careers.

The five of them spend their last few weeks together before they each move on to their separate adult lives. Lynn introduces Abu to a book called 'The Traumas of Utopia.' Fascinated by its poetry, Abu steals a copy from the public library. He also stays at Ali's place for awhile since he is not yet prepared to face his parents. Eventually, Abu goes home to visit his dotting mother but flees after coming face to face with his disciplinarian father. Abu is estranged from his father, who keeps comparing him to his dead elder brother, who was an overachiever that made their parents proud.

Meanwhile, Abu's friends have struggles of their own as well. Unknown to anyone, Abu's brother was Addi's chat buddy named Vanilla Ice with whom she was falling in love with. Not realizing that he has been murdered, Addi is still looking for closure ever since her chat buddy disappeared. Abu tries to help her by introducing her to a middle-aged man pretending to be Vanilla Ice. Sophie's socialite mother is left by at the altar by her fiance, Jamal. Fearing that her daughter will leave her too, she hides Sophie's acceptance letter from a foreign university in order to keep her close. Lynn, who writes comics under the pseudonym Teka-Teki, decides to stop publishing her popular fanzine series, KAMI. Instead, she starts writing reviews for a local magazine. She ends up writing an unfavourable review on an up-and-coming indie band called The Disasters, which Ali is secretly a member of. Apart from his struggling band and his dreadful desk job at a tour agency, Ali is faced with his parents impending divorce and turns to drugs for comfort.

Later that weekend, the five friends attend a mini-concert to cool off some steam. Lynn bumps into Boy, a drug dealer who she once sold drugs for before she moved to the city from Hulu Selangor. A fight breaks out when Ali and Abu try to help Lynn avoid Boy and his minions. A few days later, Boy once again confronts Lynn but Ali intervenes by paying off her debts for her. Lynn is offended by Ali's interference and warns him not to get involved in her life anymore. On the other hand, Boy is angered by the wealthy Ali's arrogance and swears to get revenge.

A desperate Ali contacts Razak, a pusher to get some ecstasy pills. However, his phone call is answered by Boy, who instructs him to meet one of his subordinates to get the drugs. Boy then threatens Lynn into meeting a new customer to provide him with the drugs. In a twist of events, the subordinate Ali is supposed to meet turns out to be Lynn and the new customer she was instructed to meet is Ali. The two friends are shocked to learn each other's secret.

Following a disastrous performance by The Disasters, Ali tries to leave as he cannot focus on his performance due to all his personal problems. Boy shows up at the scene and tries to stab Ali in the back. However, Abu ends up getting stabbed while trying to push his friend out of the way. His friends rush him to the hospital in Ali's car but he dies.

A few days after Abu's funeral, Lynn notices he had left his bag at her mother's food stall. In it she finds a letter addressed to Addi which explains the disappearance of Vanilla Ice. Lynn sends the letter to Addi, who finally gets the closure she has been looking for all this time.

In the end, Ali leaves his job at the tour agency and joins The Disasters as a full-time member. Sophie eventually finds her acceptance letter and decides to further her studies at the university. Ali finds the book Abu stole in the backseat of his car. While visiting Lynn to mend their friendship, they find a note in the book written by Abu. He wrote, "Life is a bitch, but there's still tomorrow." The two friends then contemplate the meaning of Abu's words on their uncertain futures.

== Cast ==
- Liyana Jasmay as Lynn
- Syarul Ezani as Ali
- Juliana Evans as Sofie
- Nas-T as Abu
- Ani Zayanah Ibrahim as Adii
- Zahiril Adzim as Boy
- Beto Kusyairy as Haron
- Rozie Rashid as Lynn's mother
- Mustapha Kamal as Ali's father
- Norish Karman as Ali's mother
- Susan Manen as Sofie's mother
- Fathil Dani as Abu's father
- Dian P. Ramlee as Abu's mother
- Jean Marville as Ali's brother
- Mathis Varotsi as Abu's brother
- Victor Barc as Sofie's uncle
- Thibault Barriere as Lynn's father

== Production ==
According to Lina Tan, the Executive Director of Red Films Sdn Bhd, the film which is targeted at teenagers is about "a commercial film which revolves around teenagers' conflicts and their reactions in determining their future."

The catch phrase of this film is "Hidup ini memang palat, tapi esok masih ada." The word "palat" has been featured in the promotion materials that are included in KAMI: Vol II soundtrack, as well as in the official website. However, the word has been eliminated from the further promotion materials as well as from the dialogues in the film since it was considered as a vulgar word.

This film marks the first attempt of Effendee Mazlan as the director of a commercial film, as well as Fariza Azlina Isahak, who has written the script for the first time. Among the companies that were involved in the making of this film was Hotlink and Monkey Bone Records.

== Release ==
Kami was released to 43 cinemas across Malaysia on the first day of Hari Raya, and had a tight competition with Senario The Movie: Episode 1 which was released at the same day. Although it was predicted that it would not be able to compete with Senario The Movie, it went to raise RM1.4 million in the first two weeks of screening and it managed to avoid the possibility of massive loss.

== Critical reception ==
Initial critical reception to Kami was generally positive reviews.

Izuan Shah from Gua.com said that "the premise of this film is very simple and interesting to grasp the attention of modern teenagers", giving the movie a rating of 8 out of 10. His compliment went to Nas Muammar who "commanded the character Abu convincingly with his natural talent" as well as Zahiril "who has the potential of a newcomer".

Nurulhisham Abdul Latiff from Berita Harian complimented all the casts for their successful performance, especially Liyana Jasmay, Nas Muammar and Zahiril. However, she further commented that "the recording style of this film is unsuitable for some audience" but "it was a fine job after all.

== Soundtrack ==
1. Meet Uncle Hussain - Pari-pari di Bawah Angin
2. Laila's Lounge - Mawar Khayalan
3. Harmacy - Riuh
4. Dragon Red - K.A.M.I (Kerana Aku Masih Ingat)
5. Couple - Hey Now!
6. Meor - Hari Hari Autistik
7. Twickheads - Guris
8. Telebury - Stars Belong to Us
9. Love Me Butch - This is Our Year
10. Sharidir - Kamu
11. Bittersweet - Going Into the Black Hole
12. Koffin Kanser - Berong
13. The Aggrobeats - We Got Soul
14. They Will Kill Us All - Secret Episodes
15. Butterfingers - 1000 Tahun
