= Que Haidar =

Malaysian actor

- Born: Tengku Iskhan Shah bin Tengku Haidar; Felda Taib Andak, Kulai, Johor, Malaysia
- Occupations: Actor, singer, director, writer, producer
- Years active: 2001–present
- Spouse: Linda Jasmine (m. 2009; div. 2024)
- Children: 1. Qalif Khan Khan Imran Abdullah (former-stepson); 2. Tengku Ratu Haidar Tengku Iskhan Shah (biological-daughter); 3. Tengku Cleopatra Haidar Tengku Iskhan Shah (biological-daughter)

Tengku Iskhan Shah bin Tengku Haidar, better known by his stage name Que Haidar, is a Malaysian actor.

== Personal life ==
Que decided to retire from acting as a surprise in 2009 after marrying the choreographer Linda Jasmine.

The couple officially divorced in July 2024 after 15 years of marriage. They share 2 daughters together.

== Filmography ==
=== Film ===
Year	Title	Role	Notes
2005	KL Menjerit 1	Ku Idzham	Debut film appearances
2005	Rock	Amy Mat Piah	
2006	Castello	Sepet	
2006	Senario Pemburu Emas Yamashita	Jali	
2006	Bilut	Yusof	
2006	Cinta	Muhammad Dhani	
2007	Syaitan	Saad	
2007	Zombi Kampung Pisang	Deris	
2007	Haru Biru	Kid	
2008	Cuci	Singer	Cameo
2008	Selamat Pagi Cinta	Azam	
2009	Maut	JJ	
2009	Skrip 7707	Zack	
2009	Setem	Iskander	
2009	Papadom	Mat	
2009	My Spy	Man Chinese	
2009	Duhai Si Pari-Pari	Syadon	
2010	Lagenda Budak Setan	Azmi	
2011	Misteri Jalan Lama	llya	
2013	Rock Ooo	Amy Mat Piah	
2014	Gila Baby		Cameo
2014	Ophilia	Ozi Gandum	
2026	Malaikat Malam	Arash	

=== Television series ===
Year	Title	Role	TV channel
2005	Kasih Nurlisa		TV1
2006–2007	Gol & Gincu The Series	Ikan	8TV
2007	Dunia Baru	Umarah	TV3
2008	KL Menjerit The Series	Opie	Astro Ria
2009	Cinta Untuk Ain	Shahrul	TV3
2026	Pak Su Ammara	Pak Su	Astro Ria

=== Telemovie ===
Year	Title	Role	TV channel	Notes
2001	Toll Gate Girl		VCD	
2006	Misi: XX-Ray	Jali	TV3	
2007	Tuhan Pun Tahu		TV3	
2008	Terlerai Takbir Kasih	Azhar	TV3	
2008	Sebelum Sejadah Dibentang	Aiman	TV3	
2008	Orang Minyak Naik Minyak		Astro Prima	
2015	Cahaya Malaika	Ezra	TV3	
2018	Malek	Majid	Astro Citra	Also as executive producer
2020	Pencipta Pegang Waktu	Zakree (Zee)	TV3	Also as original story
2020	Yang Tersembunyi	Zharif	TV Okey	
2022	Lebai Sampan	Hatta	Astro Citra	
2022	Bahalol	—	TV2	Also as director, original story and executive producer

== Discography ==
=== Singles ===
Year	Song title
2017	"Kisah Cinta"

== Awards and nominations ==
Anugerah Bintang Popular Berita Harian (ABPBH)
Year	Category	Results
2006	Pelakon Filem Lelaki Popular	Nominated
2008	Pelakon Filem Lelaki Popular	Won
2009	Pelakon Filem Lelaki Popular	Won

Festival Filem Malaysia
Year	Nominated works	Category	Results
2006 (FFM 19)	KL Menjerit 1	Pelakon Lelaki Terbaik	Nominated
2006 (FFM 19)	KL Menjerit 1	Pelakon Harapan Lelaki	Nominated
2006 (FFM 19)	Castello	Pelakon Pembantu Lelaki Terbaik	Nominated
2006 (FFM 19)	Castello	Pelakon Harapan Lelaki	Won
2009 (FFM 22)	Maut	Pelakon Lelaki Terbaik	Nominated
2009 (FFM 22)	Papadom	Pelakon Pembantu Lelaki Terbaik	Nominated
2010 (FFM 23)	Lagenda Budak Setan	Pelakon Pembantu Lelaki Terbaik	Nominated
