= Maria Mariana =

1996 film by Yusof Haslam

- Directed by: Yusof Haslam
- Written by: Yusof Haslam
- Screenplay by: Yusof Haslam
- Story by: Yusof Haslam
- Produced by: Yusof Haslam
- Starring: Erra Fazira; Ziana Zain; Edika Yusof; Roy Azman
- Edited by: Salehan Samsuddin
- Distributed by: Grand Brilliance Sdn Bhd; Skop Productions Sdn Bhd.
- Release date: 18 April 1996
- Running time: 105 minutes
- Country: Malaysia
- Language: Malay
- Box office: MYR 4.7 million

Maria Mariana is a 1996 Malaysian Malay-language police procedural action crime film directed by Yusof Haslam starring Erra Fazira, Ziana Zain, Edika Yusof and Roy Azman. It revolves around a story of two sisters, Maria (Erra Fazira) and Mariana (Ziana Zain), who are very different in character. The film explores the issue of a troublesome yet rebellious teenager but at the same time reveals that love can change anything.

== Synopsis ==
Maria and Mariana are sisters but they are poles apart. Mariana is wild while her elder sister is more reserved and takes great interest in her education and career. When they become adults, Maria joins the police force while Mariana remains the same. The presence of a man named Jefri changes Mariana's life. However, Jefri chooses to marry Maria instead, much to her disappointment. Tony and Robert, leaders of a criminal gang which Maria is trying to nab, kidnap Mariana. The ever responsible Maria risks her own life to save her sister.

== Cast ==
- Erra Fazira as Maria
- Ziana Zain as Mariana
- Edika Yusof as Jeffri
- Roy Azman as Ray
- Noraini Hashim as Zainab
- Kenji Sawahi as Tony
- A. Galak as Mr. Zakaria

== Box office ==
The film which was released on 18 April 1996 went box office and grossed RM4.7 million.

== Awards and nominations ==
13th Malaysian Film Festival, 1997

- Special Jury Award - Box-Office Film (Won)

2nd Anugerah Skrin TV3, 1997

- Best Supporting Actress - Ziana Zain (Won)

== Soundtrack ==
Maria Mariana Soundtrack

Soundtrack album by Johari Teh
- Released: 1996
- Genre: Soundtrack
- Label: BMG

Johari Teh chronology
Maria Mariana Soundtrack (1996)	Maria Mariana II Original Soundtrack (1998)

The film soundtrack was predominantly composed by Johari Teh and features Ziana Zain as the lead singer of all the ten soundtracks.

1. "Korban Cinta" (Johari Teh)
2. "Dialog: Tiada Kepastian" (Johari Teh)
3. "Dialog: Kasih Ku Pertahankan" (Anuar, Azam Dungun)
4. "Dialog: Setia Ku Di Sini" (Salman, Nurbisa II)
5. "Dialog: Madah Berhelah" (Saari Amri)
6. "Dialog: Anggapan Mu" (Asmin Mudin)
7. "Dialog: Putus Terpaksa" (Saari Amri)
8. "Dialog: Bersama Akhirnya" (Johari Teh)
9. "Dialog: Kemelut Di Muara Kasih" (Saari Amri, Lukhman S.)
10. "Dialog: Korban Cinta" (Johari Teh)

== Television ==
A drama series of the same title was produced based on the same plot of the movie. The lead cast of the drama was held by Abby Abadi and Azza Elite.
