= Bara (1999 film) =

- Poster
- Directed by: Yusof Haslam
- Written by: Yusof Haslam
- Produced by: Yusof Haslam
- Starring: Awie; Nasha Aziz; Rosyam Nor; Zamani Slam
- Cinematography: Omar Ismail; Omar Man
- Edited by: Salehan Samsuddin
- Music by: Saari Amri
- Production companies: Skop Productions; Grand Brilliance Sdn Bhd
- Release date: 25 March 1999
- Running time: 110 minutes
- Country: Malaysia
- Language: Malay
- Box office: MYR 2.8 million

Bara (English: Embers) is a 1999 Malaysian Malay-language action romance film directed by Yusof Haslam and starring Awie, Nasha Aziz, Rosyam Nor and Zamani Slam in his acting debut. Rosyam Nor won the Best Supporting Actor award and Nasha Aziz won the best actress at the 14th Malaysian Film Festival. This film was released on 25 March 1999 to positive reviews from critics and was a commercial success grossing MYR 2.8 million.

== Plot ==
Effa almost becomes a victim of prostitution in a syndicate led by Carlos. Effa meets Amri and asks him for help, but she does not go to the police station. Amri and Effa eventually fall in love with each other. One day, Carlos goes up to Effa and interferes with her life so that she will rejoin the syndicate. When Effa unexpectedly dies, Amri becomes the prime suspect. How Amri finds the killer and becomes vindicated forms the rest of the story.

== Cast ==
- Awie as Amri, a mechanic & part-time nightclub singer and best friend of Ziman
- Nasha Aziz as Effa, a girl from the village who became a victim of Carlos' prostitution.
- Rosyam Nor as Carlos, Head of the prostitution syndicate and Effa's killer
- Zamani as Ziman, Amri's friend & Arni's boyfriend
- Arni Nazira as Arni, Amri's friend & Ziman's girlfriend
- Azza Elite as Mona, Amri's colleague and Effa's housemate
- A. Galak as Father Arni
- Raja Noor Baizura as Arni's Mother
- Jojet as Jojet, the nightclub bartender
- Farid Amirul as Ah Boon, Carlos's right-hand man
- Yank Kassim as Dino, Carlos II's right-hand man
- Ning Baizura as Zety, prostitute for Carlos' syndicate
- Riezman Khuzaimi as the Mystery Man
- Shaharon Anuar Abdul Latif as ASP Saiful
- Wendy Wong as Inspector Susan/Nancy
- AC Mizal as Hisham, Arni's ex-fiancé and boyfriend
- Deen Maidin as Maniam

=== Special appearances ===
- Shah Slam as a Musician
- Invite Slam as a Musician
- Lili Slam as a Musician
- Man Slam as a Musician
- Majed Salleh as Club Manager

== Production ==
The character of Effa was offered by Erra Fazira but declined due to personal problems and was replaced by Nasha Aziz.

== Reception ==
The film was critically acclaimed upon release. Sajahan Waheed of the New Straits Times called the film "watchable" since it incorporated many of the director's tropes from his previous films and since the plot was used in many films. He praised the acting and music but felt that Awie should have had a more challenging role.

At the 14th Malaysian Film Festival, Rosyam Nor won the Best Supporting Actor award.

== Home media ==
The film was telecast on Astro Ria several times between 2000 and 2001.
