= Castello (film) =

- Malaysian film poster
- Directed by: Bade Hj. Azmi
- Written by: Bade Hj. Azmi
- Screenplay by: Bade Hj. Azmi
- Story by: Bade Hj. Azmi
- Produced by: Rosyam Nor; Runika Mohd Yusuf
- Starring: Rosyam Nor; Erra Fazira; Que Haidar; Liyana Jasmay
- Cinematography: Mohd Azla Kamaruddi
- Music by: Zul Mahat
- Production company: Berjaya Film Production
- Distributed by: Julie's Biscuits; TeamArYzs
- Release date: 5 January 2006 (Malaysia)
- Running time: 95 minutes
- Country: Malaysia
- Language: Malay
- Budget: MYR1.56 million
- Box office: MYR 1.28 million

Castello is a 2006 Malaysian Malay-language action crime film, written and directed by Bade Hj. Azmi. The film had wide release on January 9, 2006 in ninety-one cinemas across Malaysia, including Singapore and Brunei, it also stars Rosyam Nor, Erra Fazira, Que Haidar, and Liyana Jasmay. The main character is played by Nor, and represents the actor's first foray into film production.

== Production ==
Director Bade Hj. Azmi wrote the film, working on its script for one-and-a-half years. To produce the film, Rosyam Nor initially received Finas funds of RM400,000 with the rest of funding from Julie's Biscuits.

== Synopsis ==
Castello brings a story about Solo, a teenager raised in the Golok River. Solo married a Thai girl named Chalita. At the time of Chalita's pregnancy, he started to act as a drug trafficker to make her family's life more luxurious. But he was arrested and he was jailed for twenty years. In prison, he is known as Castello. After leaving prison, Castello tried to trace his wife and son. But he was disappointed when he learnt that his daughter Phim had become a drug addict. Castello strives to save Phim who is unaware that he is her father. One day Castello took Phim's money while the girl was dealing with drugs. Because of his overload, beyond Castello's consciousness, Phim has met drug traffickers and told him about his financial problems.

The distributor gives Phim the drugs she needs. But at the time Phim was high, she was raped by the distributors' friends as her debt to the distributor. Castello 'goes crazy' as soon as it finds Phim's destruction. He was determined to take revenge. But while struggling to defend his dignified child's dignity, Chalita (Castello's wife) was killed by the distributors' friends. Of course, Castello became angry and he acted more crazy.

== Cast ==
- Rosyam Nor as Castello @ Solo
- Erra Fazira as Chalita
- Que Haidar as Sepet
- Liyana Jasmay as Phim
- Zain Hamid as Solo
- Nuremy Ramli as Chalita
- Nasrizal Ngasri as Nik
- M. Rajoli as Ustaz Asri
- Zack Taipan as Thai Nom
- Bront Palarae as Chet
- Suhaimi Suandi as Azan
- Kamarool Haji Yusoff as Chief Smuggler
- Abdul Aziz as Adi
- Erma Fatima as Adi Mother's
- Bohari Rahmat as Adi Father's
- Prono as Drug Addict
- Ramona Zamzam as Club Waiter
- Fizz Fairuz as Kuncu Sepet

== Reception ==
Sun Daily reported that the film collected RM2.8 million at the box office.
