= Johari Teh =

- Born: 21 September 1955 (age 70); Malaysia
- Genres: Pop, Rock, Ballad
- Occupations: Composer, Lyricist, Record Producer
- Years active: 1980s–2010s

Johari Teh is a Malaysian composer, lyricist, and record producer. He was a composer from the 1980s until the 2000s, producing songs for local artists such as Awie and Ziana Zain.

== Career ==
Johari Teh began his career in the early 1980s as a singer-songwriter. His first album was Renungan (1982). He later shifted to composing and producing for Malaysian artists.

Johari Teh's compositions for Ziana Zain include Tiada Kepastian and Bersama Akhirnya from the album Setia Ku Di Sini (1995), one of Malaysia’s best-selling albums of the year. Bersama Akhirnya later won the Voice of Asia Best Song award in 1995. He also contributed multiple songs to Ziana Zain Unplugged (1996), including Korban Cinta, Tiada Kepastian, Dekat Tapi Jauh, and Gerhana.

He composed the ballad Ratuku for Awie in 1994 and Baldu Biru for Ella in 2005. He also wrote Jika Kau Rasa Getarnya, recorded by the band Slam in 1996.

He served as a judge for the Anugerah Industri Muzik (AIM) in its 19th and 22nd editions. He was also executive producer for the contemporary traditional album Lentera Timur (2008) by Siti Nurhaliza, contributing the song Di Kayangan Kita.

Teh composed music for the feature film Tragedi Oktober (1996) and the television drama Sembilu 2005.

Teh's songs have won several awards at the Anugerah Industri Muzik (AIM).

He was a mentor to younger musicians. In 2019, singer Ezly Syazwan said that Teh advised him to "always remain humble" regardless of success.

Songs such as Ratuku, Baldu Biru, and Jika Kau Rasa Getarnya remain popular and continue to be performed in concerts and nostalgic television programs. The compilation album Profile Johari Teh was released in 1997 by BMG Music.

=== Notable songs ===
- Bersama Akhirnya – Ziana Zain
- Tiada Kepastian – Ziana Zain
- Korban Cinta – Ziana Zain
- Dekat Tapi Jauh – Ziana Zain & Broery Marantika
- Gerhana – Ziana Zain
- Ratuku – Awie
- Baldu Biru – Ella & Awie
- Jika Kau Rasa Getarnya – Slam

== See also ==
- Ziana Zain
- Anugerah Industri Muzik
- Awie
- Slam (band)
- Siti Nurhaliza
