= Eddie Pak =

Malaysian film director (born 1965)

- Born: Pak Mun Kwong; 8 August 1965 (age 61); Malaysia
- Other name: Mohd Aliff Najmi bin Abdullah
- Occupations: Film director, Producer, Scriptwriter

Eddie.Pak / MK.Pak (born Pak Mun Kwong; 8 August 1965), Chinese: 白文光 is a Malaysian film director, producer and scriptwriter, whose career spans more than 40 years, filled with awards and accomplishments. Eddie's body of work addresses such themes as action, crime pursued by vengeance, drama, morality and beliefs.

== Early life ==
Pak was born on 8 August 1965.

== Career ==
=== 1980s ===
Pak started out in the entertainment industry in 1980, when he traveled to Hong Kong to launch his career in making films, working with Hong Kong and Taiwanese actors, producers, and directors.

In 1985, Pak managed to make a big splash in the film industry at the age of 21 with a Hong Kong and Malaysia joint-venture feature film, "Kumpulan O". Along with directing a number of Chinese shows, an entertainment program for the Malaysian national TV channel (RTM TV), he wrote several Chinese shows at that time.

=== 1990s ===
During the 1990s, PaPakook a grand step in his film-making career by trying out film directing. He directed a couple of popular dramas and films.

One of his most noticeable accomplishments occurred in 1991, when ‘Kisah Benar’, his self-conceptualized and produced drama, was aired on TV3. The drama series aired for almost 16 years. The series was a collection of real-life incidents adapted into a drama in order to give awareness and consciousness of the various real-life crime cases.

In 1993, MK produced and directed ‘Red-Haired Tumbler in Malaysia’ which had an international release in the UK, USA and Canada.

In 1998, he produced and directed “Twist of Fate” for screenings in Hong Kong and China. The production was also released for distribution via DVD and online.

=== 2000s ===
In 2001, he co-founded the Malaysian Film Directors Association.

In 2004, the Malaysian film director created the first Cantonese Drama series to ever go on RTM/Filem Negara, and it was called “Tin Gei Bin” (Lingkaran Emas/Golden Chain) with the number of 300 episodes.

“Dance, The Lion” was the title of one of his most remarkable achievements, produced in 2007, was a 50 minutes traditional cultural documentary, in which he presented and explained the uniqueness of the traditional Chinese cultural dance. After many years of producing/directing films and dramas, he got into the TVC industry, in 2007, he decided to show his support for the up-and-coming talents in the growing international film industry through producing couple of short films.

=== 2010s ===
In 2013, Psk became CEO of Lexus Global Entertainment Sdn Bhd. In 2015 he became the first Non-Chinese citizen to be chosen as an ambassador for Small and Middle-sized Enterprise Credit Union China. In 2018, Pak received an honorary doctorate degree of Humanities from All Nations College in the Philippines.

== Charity work and activism ==
Eddie's work and success was never a distraction for him to give back to society by helping in need. He joined forces with business partners, sponsors, donors & friends, and accumulated RMB 500,000 to build a 'HOPE' Schools in China. This new development aims to ease school children with their journey and lessen the time needed to travel to receive education.

During 2013, Pak touched by the story from one of China's renown animal activist, Madam Yang Xiao Yun (who rescued more than 3000 dogs for the past 20+ years) decided to produce a documentary about stray dogs to spread awareness on the cruel dog meat trade in collaboration with independent rescuers & international NGO's in Asia. With his compassion, love of strays, and stance against animal abuse, he garnered a lot of attention from global citizens and charity organizations to make donations to help fund for the stray's medical and food needs.

== Awards and recognition ==
In 1995, Pak won Best Concept and Special Awards at Malaysia Film Festival for Red-Haired Tumbler in Malaya, in which he produced and directed.

In 1996, he presented for TV3 ASK (Anugerah Skrin Awards), to which he was invited to present later on in 2006.

In 2000, Pak won Best Concept & Best Music at Malaysia Film Festival for “Syukur 21”, knowing that he directed and produced it himself, which created some sort of controversy within the Malaysian society since he tackled Muslim religion as well as one's morality and virtues issues, many others considered it rather eye-opening, not to mention that it had quite of an impact on raising awareness in the Malaysian society.

In 2008, “Dance, The Lion” was screened at Cannes Film Festival 2008 and invited to participate at the San Francisco Festival. His documentary was distributed worldwide: Europe, Middle-East and Asia countries.
