= Nasha Aziz =

Malaysian actress

- Born: Noraishah binti Abdul Aziz; 14 May 1971 (age 55); Kampung Pandan, Kuala Lumpur, Malaysia
- Occupations: Actress and model
- Years active: 1989–present
- Parent: Abdul Aziz Mohd. Ali (father)
- Relatives: Azrin Aziz (brother)
- Awards: Best New Actress (FFM13) & Best Actress (FFM17)

Noraishah "Nasha" Abdul Aziz (born 14 May 1971) is a Malaysian model and actress. She was born in Kampung Pandan, Kuala Lumpur, Malaysia.

== Modelling career ==
Aziz started her career as a model in 1989. She was introduced to the modelling industry by actress and model Tiara Jacquelina. She continued to build her fame as a model in Malaysia and declined an offer of a New York modelling contract because of religious and cultural factors. She modelled in Hong Kong and London and then branched out into acting.

Nasha was given the title of Malay number one supermodel and an icon. She appeared in commercials for products such as Nescafe Classic, Avon, Pantene and Panasonic. Nasha was the face of Avon, Polo Hauss and Polo Ralph Lauren.

== Acting career ==
Nasha began her acting career in 1995, starring in Kad Cinta alongside Hairie Othman. The movie was directed and produced by Julie Dahlan. She rose to fame in 1998 after starring in a popular TV Series Hanya Dikau alongside Rosyam Nor and Hairie Othman. She was also well liked for her character in the Soap Opera, Idaman.

In 1998 Nasha received an acting offer from director Yusof Haslam to play Effa, a prostitute, in the movie Bara. The role was previously turned down by Malay film primadona, Erra Fazira. The movie proved to be a stepping stone for Nasha when she was nominated in the Best Actress category and won Best New Actress at the 13th Malaysia's Film Festival (FFM13).

== Filmography ==
=== Film ===
| Year | Title | Role | Notes & Awards |
|---|---|---|---|
| 1995 | Kad Cinta | Julia | Debut film appearances |
| 1997 | Puteri Impian | Puteri Fatehah | |
| 1999 | Bara | Effa | (Won) Aktres Harapan Festival Filem Malaysia ke 14; (Nominated) Aktres Terbaik Festival Filem Malaysia ke 14; (Nominated) Aktres Terbaik Anugerah Skrin 1999 |
| 2001 | Gerak Khas The Movie | Suzanna | |
| 2003 | Laila Isabella | Laila / Isabella | |
| 2004 | Trauma | Jeslina | (Won) Aktres Terbaik Festival Filem Malaysia ke 17; (Won) Aktres Terbaik Anugerah Skrin 2005; (Nominated) Aktres Pembantu Terbaik Festival Filem Asia ke 49; Fukuoka, Jepun |
| 2004 | Buli | Dr Ika | |
| 2004 | Cinta Luar Biasa | Farah | |
| 2005 | Tak Ori Tapi OK | Sarah / Saloma | |
| 2005 | Kemarau Cinta | Aida Zulfikari | |
| 2006 | Buli Balik | Dr. Ika | |
| 2007 | Puaka Tebing Biru | Ratna | (Nominated) Aktres Terbaik Festival Filem Malaysia ke 20; (Nominated) Aktres Terbaik Anugerah Skrin 2007 |
| 2007 | Otai | Azura | (Nominated) Aktres Terbaik Festival Filem Malaysia ke 21 |
| 2008 | Sepi | Suzie | (Won) Aktres Pembantu Terbaik Anugerah Skrin 2008 |
| 2016 | Usin UFO | | Cameo appearance |
| 2017 | Spy In Love | Fazira | |
| 2021 | Selamat Hari X Jadi | Mummy Hani | |
| 2022 | Talbis Iblis | Junaidah a.k.a. Mak Ju | |

=== Television series ===
| Year | Title | Role | TV channel | Notes |
|---|---|---|---|---|
| 1994 | Duit Free | | | |
| 1998 | Hanya Dikau | | TV3 | |
| 1998 | Idaman (Season 2) | | Astro Ria | |
| 1998 | Inikah Cinta | | | |
| 1999 | Apartment 1-D | | NTV7 | |
| 1999 | Detektif Metropolitan | | TV3 | |
| 2000 | Kepulangan | | Astro Ria | |
| 2001 | Siti, Wan & Kembang | | TV3 | |
| 2004 | Kutub Utara Kutub Selatan | Rohana | TV2 | |
| 2004 | Maya Mira | | TV3 | |
| 2005 | Inspirion | | TV3 | |
| 2007 | Datin Diaries | Datin Sally | TV3 | |
| 2007 | Kau Yang Ku Sayang | | TV1 | |
| 2008 | Terlalu Istimewa | | TV3 | |
| 2008 | Sofia Adawiyah | | TV2 | |
| 2009 | Awan Dania (Season 1) | | Astro Ria | |
| 2009 | Kasih Tercipta | Tona | Astro Prima | |
| 2011 | Akulah Bos | | Astro Warna | |
| 2011 | Supermak | Amy Salim | TV3 | |
| 2013 | Maskara | Liza | TV1 | |
| 2019 | Iktibar | Kay | TV3 | Episode: "Derita Di Sebalik Nafsu" |
| 2022 | Kerana Dia Suka | Seha | TV3 | |

=== Telemovie ===
| Year | Title | Role | TV channel |
|---|---|---|---|
| 2001 | Makan Besar | | TV2 |
| 2001 | Siti Wan & Kembang | Siti Wan | VCD |
| 2002 | Berakhirnya Sebuah Ramadan | | TV3 |
| 2003 | Che Mat | | TV3 |
| 2003 | Cik Mala Janda Berhias | Cik Mala | TV3 |
| 2011 | Surah Al-Fatihah | Mastura | TV3 |
| 2011 | Dendam Maya | Karmila | Astro Citra |
| 2012 | Diari Bella | Bella | TV2 |
| 2013 | 7 Dulang Asam Pedas | Junaidah | TV1 |
| 2013 | Kasih Bersulam Daun Palas | Fazlina | Astro Maya HD |
| 2013 | Demi Kamu Cinta | | Astro Ria |
| 2014 | Sekilas Cinta | | TV1 |
| 2014 | Tangis Yang Tiada Noktah | Datin Zara | TV3 |
| 2014 | Nek Tempawan | Nek Tempawan | TV2 |
| 2016 | Mati Tunggu Sekejap | Mariam | Astro Maya HD |
| 2016 | Bahang Neraka | Nina | Astro Prima |
| 2018 | Super Menantu | Elfa Qismaura | NTV7 |
| 2018 | 3 Bahadol | Laila | Astro Warna |
| 2018 | I Heart You Cik Yah | Qarina | Astro Citra |
| 2018 | Kembarku Robot | | Astro Ceria |
| 2020 | Mak Nak Peluk Boleh? | Miss Daisy | TV3 |
| 2022 | Bini-Bini Lockdown | Shima | TV3 |
| 2022 | Curi Duit Raya | Dato' Mas | Astro Citra |

=== Theatre ===
| Year | Title |
|---|---|
| 2006 | Lantai T Pinkie |
| 2010 | Antara |
| 2014 | Di Bawah Lindungan Ka'bah |

=== TV Show & other appearances ===
- Spring-Summer Zang Toi New York Fashion Show (2001 - as Runway Model)
- ABPBH TV3 (2004 - as Award Presenter / Penyampai Anugerah)
- Evening With The Stars KL Fashion Week (2004 - as Guest Artist & Runway Model)
- Evening With The Stars KL Fashion Week (2005 - as Guest Artist & Runway Model)
- Anugerah Skrin TV3 (2006 - as Award Presenter)
- Anugerah Filem Pendek RTM1 (2007 - as Award Presenter)
- AVON Walk Around The World For Breasts Cancer Awareness Campaign (2008 - as AVON ambassador)
- Anak Wayang Astro RIA (2009 - as Jury / Juri Tetap)
- The Green Party The Curve Fashion Week (2010 - as Guest Artist & Model)
- MIFA Gala Night Malaysia International Fashion Week (2010 - as Guest Artist & Runway Model for Syaiful Baharim)
- CNY Festival Shanghai Fashion Show (2013 - as Runway Model)
- Fesyenista Manja Baby Kiko (Season 3) Astro RIA (2014 - as Jury / Juri Tetap)
- Magnum KL Grand Opening MAGNUM Ice Cream Malaysia (2015 - as Guest Artist)
- Majlis Pelancaran Koleksi Paloma Ezuwan Ismail Collection (2016 - as Guest Artist & Model)
- MeleTOP Astro RIA & Astro RIA HD (2016 - as Guest Artist)
- Sepahtu Reunion Live Astro RIA HD & Astro MAYA HD (2017 - as Guest Artist / Cameo)
- Anugerah MeleTOP ERA Astro RIA & Astro RIA HD (2017 - as Award Presenter)
- Kempen Raya Ekslusif RizmanRuzaini Collection (2017 - as Guest Artist & Model)
- FFM29 - Malaysia Film Festival Astro RIA & Astro MAYA HD (2017 - as Award Presenter)
- Ready-to-wear RizmanRuzaini Collection KL Fashion Week (2017 - as Guest Artist & Runway Model)
- Lefestour Grand Finale Fashion Show Azhar Zainal Collection (2017 - as Guest Artist & Runway Model)
- AJL Trophy Introduction RizmanRuzaini Special Edition TV3 (2018 - as Runway Model)
- Gen F Astro RIA HD (2018 - as Guest Jury / Juri Jemputan)

=== Magazine cover ===
- GLAM November Issue (2004)
- GLAM January Issue (2008)
- InTrend February Issue (2008)
- JOMSTAR.com January Issue (2009)
- EH! October Issue (2009)
- GLAM September Issue (2011)
- ENF Entertainment & Fashion (2012)
- WW Fashion September Issue (2013)
- MalayMillennialModern September Issue (2017)
- NONA November Issue (2018)

== Awards and nominations ==
Anugerah Bintang Popular Berita Harian (ABPBH)
| Year | Category | Result |
|---|---|---|
| 1999 | Pelakon filem Wanita Popular | Nominated |
| 2001 | Pelakon TV Wanita Popular | Nominated |
| 2002 | Pelakon TV Wanita Popular | Nominated |
| 2003 | Pelakon TV Wanita Popular | Nominated |
| 2003 | Pelakon filem Wanita Popular | Nominated |
| 2004 | Pelakon TV Wanita Popular | Nominated |
| 2004 | Pelakon filem Wanita Popular | Nominated |
| 2005 | Pelakon TV Wanita Popular | Nominated |
| 2005 | Pelakon filem Wanita Popular | Nominated |
| 2006 | Pelakon Filem Wanita Popular | Nominated |

- Pelakon filem Wanita Popular means Famous film actress
- Pelakon TV Wanita Popular means Famous TV actress

Anugerah Skrin TV3
| Year | Nominated work | Category | Result |
|---|---|---|---|
| 1999 | Bara | Pelakon Wanita Terbaik (Film) | Nominated |
| 2003 | Cik Mala Janda Berhias | Pelakon Wanita Terbaik (Drama) | Nominated |
| 2005 | Trauma (2004 Malay film) | Pelakon Wanita Terbaik (Film) | Won |
| 2007 | Puaka Tebing Biru | Pelakon Wanita Terbaik (Film) | Nominated |
| 2008 | Sepi | Pelakon Pembantu Wanita Terbaik (Film) | Won |

- Pelakon Wanita Terbaik means Best actress
- Pelakon Pembantu Wanita Terbaik means Best supporting actress

Festival Filem Malaysia
| Year | Nominated work | Category | Result |
|---|---|---|---|
| 1999 (FFM 14) | Bara | Pelakon Wanita Terbaik | Nominated |
| 1999 (FFM 14) | Bara | Pelakon Harapan Wanita | Won |
| 2004 (FFM 17) | Trauma (2004 Malay film) | Pelakon Wanita Terbaik | Won |
| 2007 (FFM 20) | Puaka Tebing Biru | Pelakon Wanita Terbaik | Nominated |
| 2008 (FFM 21) | Otai | Pelakon Wanita Terbaik | Nominated |

- Pelakon Wanita Terbaik means Best actress
- Pelakon Harapan Wanita means Promising actress

Festival Filem Asia Pasifik
| Year | Location | Nominated work | Category | Result |
|---|---|---|---|---|
| 2004 (FFAP 49) | Fukuoka, Japan | Trauma (2004 Malay film) | Pelakon Pembantu Wanita Terbaik | Nominated |

- Pelakon Pembantu Wanita Terbaik means Best supporting actress
