= Ning Baizura =

Malaysian singer (born 1975)

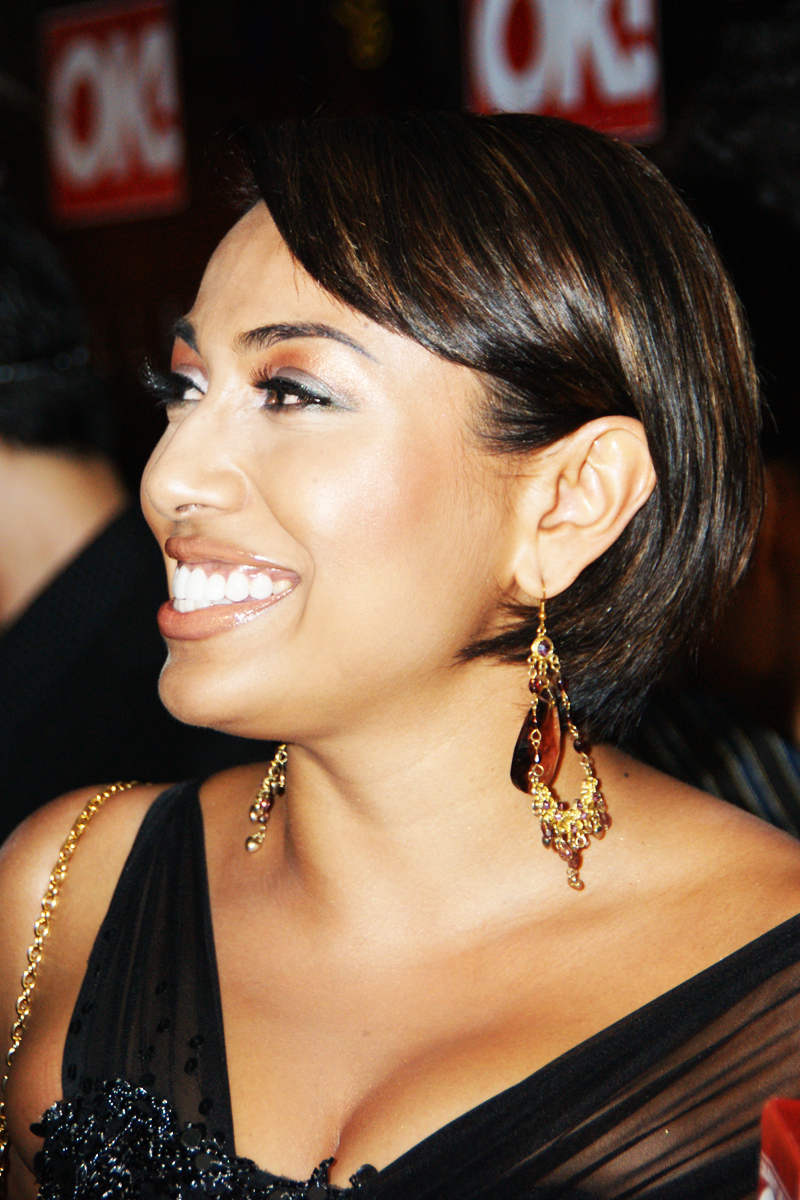
- Born: Ning Baizura binti Sheikh Hamzah; June 28, 1975 (age 51); Kajang, Selangor, Malaysia
- Other name: Ning
- Occupations: Singer, record producer
- Years active: 1992–present
- Spouse: Layton Dalton(m. 2008)
- Musical career
- Genres: Pop, R&B, Soul
- Instrument: Vocals
- Label: Sony Music Entertainment

Ning Baizura binti Sheikh Hamzah Dalton (née Ning Baizura binti Sheikh Hamzah, born 28 June 1975), better known by her stage name Ning Baizura, is a Malaysian pop and R&B singer, actress who sings in Malay, English, Japanese, Italian, French, Mandarin and Cantonese.

== Early life ==
She was born in Kajang, Malaysia from parents of Arab, Malay, Dutch, Indian, Chinese and Javanese ancestry. Ning got her unique name by accident: She had yellow fever (demam kuning in Malay) shortly after birth. This prompted her father to give her the name Ning (short for kuning, meaning yellow). She is an alumna of Convent Kajang Secondary School.

== Career ==
Ning crossed into the commercial scene in 1992 and became a recording artiste under various international labels, including (Sony, BMG, AMS Records Japan and Warner Music Group. From September 2008, she has recorded songs in the genres of pop, soul and R&B for her own music label, HappeNings Records. Her discography includes ten full studio albums (three of which are full English albums), as well as numerous compilations.

== Personal life ==
Baizura is married to Omar Shariff Christopher Layton Dalton who is English and a divorcee with two children from a previous marriage. Their wedding took place on 31 January 2008 at the Saidina Abu Bakar as-Siddiq Mosque in Bangsar, Kuala Lumpur. They have one child.

== Discography ==
=== Album ===
- 1993 – Dekat Padamu (Sony Music)
- 1994 – Ning (Sony Music)
- 1995 – Teguh (BMG)
- 1997 – Ke Sayup Bintang (BMG)
- 1997 – Always (BMG)
- 1999 – Pujaan Ku (BMG)
- 2001 – Natural Woman (AMS Records, Japan)
- 2003 – Selagi Ada... (Warner)
- 2004 – Erti Pertemuan (Warner)
- 2008 – EastTo West
- 2010 – 3 Suara (with Jaclyn Victor & Shila Amzah)
- 2011 – Dewa
- 2013 – Kekal
- 2023 – Cinta Mu Yang Satu

(single)(OST-Drama Tentang Hati Dia)

- 2024 – To Know Me (single)

(Happenings Records)

== Filmography ==
=== Film ===
Year	Title	Role
1997	Gemilang	Rita
1998	Maria Mariana II	Rozie
1999	Bara	Zety
2000	Mimpi Moon	Nona Mansoor
2004	Malaikat Di Jendela	Hamidah
2005	Lady Boss	Sheila
2007	Diva	Kartika
2008	Muallaf	Datin
2010	Magika	Puteri Gunung Ledang
2011	Cun!	Candy
2021	Mat Bond Malaya	Agent 4

=== Telemovie ===
Year	Title	Role	TV channel
2003	Azura 2003	Azura	VCD

=== Television series ===
Year	Title	Role	TV channel
2021	Madam E-Wallet	Dato' Qistina	TV3
2022	Kuasa	Puan Sri Lily	Astro Citra

=== Theatre ===
Year	Title
1997	The Storyteller
2010	SHOUT! The Mod Musical

== Awards and nominations ==
- 1991 – Voice of Asia
- 1991 – Best Artiste Development Award
- 1993 – AIM Awards: Best New Artiste
- 1993 – AIM Awards: Album of the Year (Dekat Padamu)
- 1993 – Anugerah Juara Lagu: Best Song – Ballad Category (Curiga)
- 1994 – AIM Awards: Best Pop Album (Ning)
- 1994 – Anugerah Juara Lagu: Best Song – Pop/Rock Category (Kau & Aku), award as lyricist
- 2003 – Anugerah ERA: Choice Female Vocalist
- 2004 – AIM Awards: Song of The Year (Selagi Ada Cinta)
- 2005 – AIM Awards: Best Album Cover (Erti Pertemuan)
- 2005 – AIM Awards: Best Music Video (Awan Yang Terpilu)
- 2005 – AIM Awards: Song of The Year (Awan Yang Terpilu)
- 2005 – AIM Awards: Best Pop Album (Erti Pertemuan)
- 2008 – VOIZE Favourite Local Act Award
- 2008 – Cosmopolitan Malaysia magazine's Fun, Fearless and Fabulous (FFF) Award 2008 – Singer category
- 2011 – Anugerah Planet Muzik: Best Duo/Group (award for '3 Suara' with Jaclyn Victor and Shila Hamzah)
- 2011 – AIM Awards: Best Vocal Performance In A Song Duo/Group – (Beribu Sesalan, award for '3 Suara' with Jaclyn Victor and Shila Hamzah)
- 2011 – Anugerah Juara Lagu: Best Song (Runner-up) – (Beribu Sesalan, award for '3 Suara' with Jaclyn Victor and Shila Hamzah)
- 2012 – Anugerah Bintang Popular Berita Harian: Most Popular Duo/Group (award for '3 Suara' with Jaclyn Victor and Shila Hamzah)
- 2015 – Brandlaureate Awards: Country Branding award
- 2015 – Global Leadership Awards: Excellence is Entertainment award
- 2015 – Global Branding Awards: Global Fashion Icon
- 2017 – Anugerah Personaliti Industri & Usahawan Malaysia: Malaysia Music Icon award
- 2017 – McMillan Woods Global Awards Night: Jazz Diva of the Year
