= Maria Mariana II =

1998 film by Yusof Haslam

- Directed by: Yusof Haslam
- Written by: Yusof Haslam
- Screenplay by: Yusof Haslam
- Story by: Yusof Haslam
- Produced by: Yusof Haslam
- Starring: Erra Fazira; Ziana Zain; Awie; Ning Baizura; Rosyam Nor
- Edited by: Salehan Samsuddin
- Distributed by: Grand Brilliance; Skop Productions
- Release date: 2 April 1998 (Malaysia)
- Running time: 110 minutes
- Country: Malaysia
- Language: Malay
- Box office: MYR 3.16 million

Maria Mariana II is a 1998 Malaysian Malay-language police procedural action crime film directed by Yusof Haslam starring Erra Fazira, Ziana Zain, Awie, Ning Baizura and Rosyam Nor. It was the sequel to the 1996 film Maria Mariana. The film was released in Malaysian cinemas on 2 April 1998.

== Synopsis ==
Maria is rushed to the hospital and is saved by Dr. Faris who successfully extracts the bullet from her body. Maria is assigned to the Special Unit of the Royal Malaysian Police force. She falls in love with Dr. Faris. Her unit has been directed to smash a syndicate which is trafficking ecstasy pills and drugs in the city. Meanwhile, Mariana is visited by Remy, a colleague who is attracted to her. Roy, her ex-boyfriend reappears causing turmoil in her life and Mariana reverts to her old wild ways. The relationship between the two sisters, Maria and Mariana consequently becomes strained again.

== Cast ==
- Erra Fazira as Detective Maria
- Ziana Zain as Mariana
- Awie as Sazali
- Ning Baizura as Rosie
- Rosyam Nor as Remy
- Jesslyn as Susan
- Noraini Hashim as Zainab
- Shaharon Anuar as ASP Shaharon Anuar
- Zulkifli Ismail as Dr. Faris
- Roy Azman as Ray
- Deen Maidin as Mat Motor
- Syamsul Yusof as Bridesmaid (uncredited extra)

== Reception ==
The film was released on 2 April 1998 for 42 days in 32 cinemas across Malaysia and grossed RM3,159,002.

== Soundtrack ==
Maria Mariana Soundtrack

Soundtrack album by Johari Teh
- Released: 1998
- Genre: Soundtrack
- Label: BMG

Johari Teh chronology
Maria Mariana Original Soundtrack (1996)	Maria Mariana Soundtrack (1998)

1. "Maria Mariana" (Slam)
2. "Puncak Kasih" (Ziana Zain)
3. "Kemelut Di Muara Kasih" (Ziana Zain)
4. "Alangkah" (Ning Baizura)
5. "Roda-Roda Kuala Lumpur" (AC Mizal)
6. "Syurga Hujung Malam" (Awie)
7. "Berpisah Jua" (Ziana Zain)
8. "Jangan Lama-Lama" (Sweet Charity)
9. "Sabar Menanti" (Broery Marantika & Ning Baizura)
10. "Ku Cinta Padamu" (Ziana Zain)
11. "Jangan Kau Rayu" (Amy)
12. "Setia Ku Di Sini" (Ziana Zain)
