= Hantu Kak Limah =

- Film poster
- Directed by: Mamat Khalid
- Written by: Mamat Khalid
- Produced by: Gayatri Su-Lin Pillai
- Starring: Awie; Zul Ariffin; Uqasha Senrose; Delimawati; TJ Isa; Sharwani NS
- Cinematography: Jack Rahmad
- Edited by: Amen Khalid
- Production companies: Astro Shaw; Infinitus Productions
- Release date: 9 August 2018
- Running time: 111 minutes
- Country: Malaysia
- Language: Malay

Hantu Kak Limah or known as Hantu Kak Limah 3 (English: Ghost Of Sis Limah) is a 2018 Malaysian Malay-language horror comedy film directed by Mamat Khalid starring Awie, Zul Ariffin, Uqasha Senrose, Delimawati, TJ Isa and Sharwani NS. It is a sequel to Hantu Kak Limah Balik Rumah (2010) and Husin, Mon dan Jin Pakai Toncit (2013) as well as the third and final film in Hantu Kak Limah film series. The film was released on August 9, 2018 and became a commercial success.

== Plot ==
Husin (Awie) returns to his village (Kampung Pisang) after working in Singapore. He finds work with his best friends Khuda (TJ Isa), Wani (Sharwani NS), and Yeh Sekupang (Rab Khalid) in a charcoal factory. Meanwhile, Khuda has just married older woman Kak Limah.

However, Kak Limah is found dead in the garden. At the same time, Husin, Wani, and Khuda go into the forest but don't know the news of Kak Limah's death.

Meanwhile, Yeh Sekupang (Head of Information Bureau at Kampung Pisang) is managing Kak Limah's body and assigns Nayan (Ropie Cecupak) to take care of the remains. Nayan is confused with the death of Kak Limah. Meanwhile, Khuda comes home to meet Kak Limah along with Husin and Wani. The three notice strange details and eventually realize they are interacting with a ghost. Ustaz Solihin then appears, who helps them confront Kak Limah's ghost. However, Solihin's efforts fail. The five of them learn that Kak Limah's spirit had disturbed Kampung Pisang. The next day, the body of Kak Limah is buried.

Even after the funeral Yeh Sekupang is still disturbed by Kak Limah's spiritual transformation. Ustaz Solihin then wants to abolish the spirit that is still lingering in Kampung Pisang. They try five times to recapture Kak Limah's spirit, led by Ustaz Solihin. After several hours, Kak Limah's spirit is captured, but Ustaz Solihin is once again defeated by the spirit.

As a result of this commotion, the head of a community of orang bunian ("elves" in the English translation) with his entourage descend into the human realm to explain what has happened. The spirit was sworn into the original appearance of Nor Aini. Nor Aini is the sister of Eton who falls in love with Khuda. They were married but Khuda had breached the condition by bringing Nor Aini down to human nature without the knowledge of her father. Life in human nature is not as fancy as she is accustomed to in her ethereal realm.

Nor Aini became insane which made Khuda hide her in the garden. Khuda cheated on his wife and married Kak Limah. This made Nor Aini so angry and revengeful which caused Kak Limah to die. The elf father warned Husin that he was not even able to marry Eton for such a thing to happen. The entourage finally brought back Nor Aini back to the base. The next day, Nor Aini, together with her three other friends, had broken her father's command and came down to human nature once again to disturb Husin, Wani, Khuda, and Yeh.

== Cast ==
Main Cast

- Awie as Husin
- Rab Khalid as Yeh Sekupang
- Sharwani as Wani
- TJ Isa as Khuda
- Delimawati as Kak Limah
- Zul Ariffin as Ustaz Solihin
- Uqasha Senrose as Eton/Princess Bunian

Minor Cast

- Mus May as Elf Father
- Ropie Cecupak as Nayan
- Pekin Ibrahim as Musalman
- Jue Aziz as Wife Wani
- Sabri Yunus as Village Head
- Ziema Din as Maznah
- Vea Kisil as Noraini
- Erra Fazira as Wati
- Dato' Seri Vida as herself
- Amy Mastura
- Low Jing Tiong as Hantu Bang Enam
- Imuda
- Isma Zuriyya
