= Sembilu =

1994 film

- Directed by: Yusof Haslam
- Written by: Yusof Haslam
- Produced by: Yusof Haslam
- Starring: Awie; Erra Fazira; Ziana Zain; Mustapha Kamal
- Edited by: Salehan Samsuddin
- Production company: Skop Productions
- Release date: 18 August 1994
- Running time: 109 minutes
- Country: Malaysia
- Language: Malay
- Box office: MYR 4.2 million

Sembilu (English: Painful) is a 1994 Malaysian Malay-language romantic drama film produce, written and directed by Yusof Haslam starring Erra Fazira in her first acting debut, Awie, Ziana Zain and Mustapha Kamal. The story concerns on a love story between a famous rock singer, (Awie), with his lover Wati (Erra Fazira) which is opposed by Wati's brother (Mustapha Kamal).

== Synopsis ==
Wati, a lovely undergraduate was courting Awie, the famous rock star. They were childhood sweethearts with their parents' blessings. Their relationship was well accepted, except for one person, Azman who is Wati's brother. Azman, with a history of his wife, Maria leaving him for a singer, was against all artistes. Maria later died in a tragic accident and Azman was outraged. Ziana, a nightclub singer had fallen for Awie and tried to lure him. However, the relationship between Wati and Awie remained strong when Awie sang 'Di Ambang Wati' as a symbol of their love. On the other hand, Azman was still trying to break up the pair. When Awie was in misery, Ziana took advantage of seducing Awie. Awie finally fell for Ziana's lust. Knowing this, Wati felt that she was cheated and wanted to call it quits. Nevertheless, the fling between Awie and Ziana did not go far when he realised that his heart was still with Wati.

== Cast ==
- Awie as Awie
- Erra Fazira as Wati
- Ziana Zain as Ziana
- Mustapha Kamal as Azman
- Aida Rahim as Maria
- Noraini Hashim as Salmah
- Alice Voon as Alice
- Khairil Anwar as Joe
- Adik Khairullah as Hafiz

== Reception ==
The film was released on 18 August 1994 and became a commercial success, being the highest-grossing film for the year with a gross of RM4.2 million ($1.8 million). Despite the film's box office success, it received negative reviews from critics.

== Awards and nominations ==
12th Malaysian Film Festival, 1995

- Best Supporting Actor - Mustapha Kamal (Won)
