= Awie =

Malaysian singer, musician, actor and comedian (born 1968)

Yang Hormat Dato' Awie DIMP
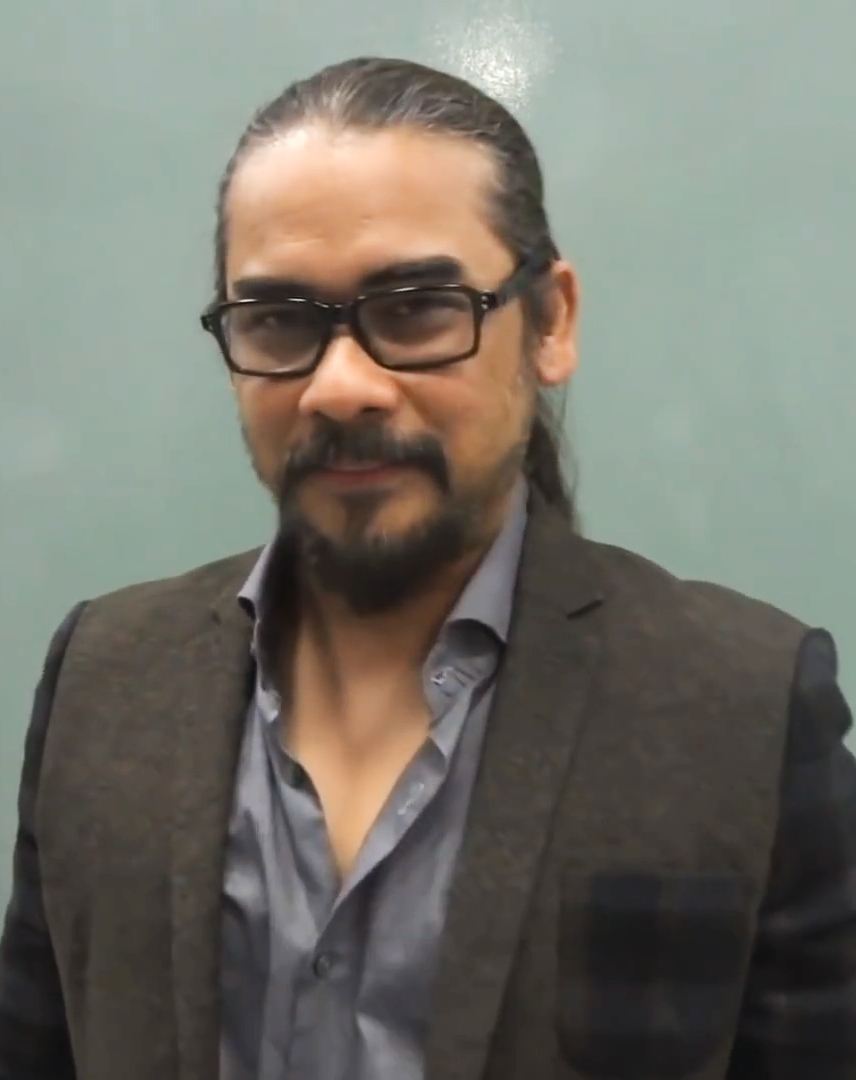
- Awie in 2016.
- Born: Ahmad Azhar bin Othman; 24 November 1968 (age 57); Datuk Keramat, Kuala Lumpur, Malaysia
- Occupations: Singer, musician, actor, comedian, television host, producer, director
- Years active: 1983–present
- Spouses: Arni Nazira Anuar (m. 1998; div. 2006) Rozana Misbun (m. 2006; div. 2014) Datin Sharifah Ladyana (m. 2016)
- Children: 7 (including Putra Ahmad Merrah)
- Musical career
- Genres: Rock kapak, hard rock, pop rock, heavy metal, glam metal, blues rock, power ballad, funky
- Member of: Wings

Dato' Ahmad Azhar bin Othman (born 24 November 1968), better known by his stage name Awie, is a Malaysian rock and heavy metal singer, musician, actor and comedian.

Born in Datuk Keramat, Kuala Lumpur, Awie's music career start in 1985 with a rock band called Wings, which he became a lead vocal at age 17. Their First Studio Album Released in 1987 called Belenggu Irama that sold around 180,000 units. After Belenggu Irama, he records another four hit albums with Wings in five-year span between 1988 and 1993, while he also played flute for Metallica’s opening concert in Florida. Awie ventured into Acting and starred in Pemburu Bayang alongside the future Queen of Rock Ella in 1993. Awie then starred in many movies in the 1990s. While Wings was at the very peak of its career, Awie had a disagreement with then Wings manager Ali Bakar and left the group in 1993. As a solo artist, Awie became one of the best selling artist in Malaysia and became a millionaire in 1995.

Awie's career slowed down in early 2000s but he still appeared in many movies - mainly comedies. He rejoined Wings to record two more albums and became one of few artist in Malaysia to record studio albums in four different decades (80s, 90s, 00s, 10s). In 2017, he has been given Knight Companion The Esteemed Order of the Crown of Pahang that carries the title Dato' by Sultan of Pahang, Sultan Ahmad Shah. Now, he is called Dato' Ahmad Azhar Bin Othman or Dato' Awie.

== Career ==
=== Early Involvement ===
At the early age of 17, Awie worked at Panggung Anniversary, Kuala Lumpur. His work enabled him to accompany several popular rock bands at the time such as Search, Bloodshed, Ella & The Boys, Sweet Charity.

=== Wings ===
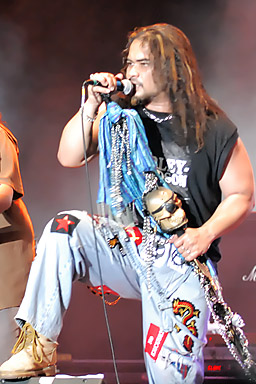
Awie performing in 2007.

Along with bassists Eddie, Awie co-founded the band Wings in early 1985. By Eddie who was the leader of the band, Awie was immediately appointed as the lead vocals from the beginning of the band's formation. They debuted with the album Belenggu Irama. Their subsequent album Hukum Karma features successful singles "Misteri Mimpi Syakilla" (composed by J.S. Kevin) and "Taman Rashidah Utama" (written by a producer Bob Lokman). Various albums followed, including Teori Domino, Jerangkung Dalam Almari and Bazooka Penaka. A number of Wings's hits are composed by singer-songwriter M. Nasir.

Awie left the band in 1993 after reported disagreements with Ali Bakar (Wings manager), and pursued a career as a solo artist and actor. He re-joined Wings in 2002 after lukewarm fan response to his replacements Mus (formerly from May) and Mel (a club singer). The band is still active. Their recent concert appearances and recordings include Wings Alive 2006 and Wings Live in KL 1991. On top of that, Awie had joined the band Samudera Astana.

=== Solo career ===
During his departure from Wings in 1993, Awie recorded his first solo album called Awie (1994) which sold around 220,000 units, a record for the highest selling album for male solo artist in Malaysia to date. Followed by couples of successful Albums such as Awie Unplugged (1995), O-Tak (1996) and Satu (1998). His compilations album Best Of Awie (1999) sold around 300,000 to 600,000 units.

=== Film career ===
Awie began his acting career in 1992 with the film Pemburu Bayang. Other locally-successful films followed, the more prominent ones being Bara and the Sembilu series. Recently Awie has concentrated on comedic roles.

== Personal life ==
Awie was engaged to Miss Malaysia Erra Fazira, his co-star in Sembilu. Due to reported infidelity, the engagement was called off.

Months later, he was caught by several Islamic law enforcers in a hotel room with Arni Nazira, his co-star in Nafas Cinta. Their obligated marriage produced two daughters. In October 2006, Arni Nazira filed for divorce after 8 years of marriage. The reason for the divorce was claimed to be due to Awie's marriage to Rozana Misbun in a secret ceremony in southern Thailand.

Awie married again in 2016 to Sharifah Ladyana Syed Samsuddin at Songkhla, Thailand.

In November 2021, Awie was ordered by the Malaysian Court of Appeal to pay RM80,000 in damages for the assault and battery of ex-wife Rozana Misbun.

== Filmography ==
=== Feature films ===
Year	Title	Role	Notes
1993	Pemburu Bayang	Awie	Debut film appearance
1994	Sembilu	Awie	
1995	Sembilu II	Awie	
1996	Tragedi Oktober	Awie	
1996	Merah	Merah	
1998	Maria Mariana II	Sazali	
1999	Nafas Cinta	Amir	
1999	Bara	Amri	
2001	Getaran	Awie	
2003	Iskandar	Karl Iskandar	
2005	Sembilu 2005	Zambri	
2005	Baik Punya Cilok	Bob KP	
2006	Diva Popular	Faizal	
2007	Brave	John	
2007	Zombi Kampung Pisang	Husin	
2007	Sumolah	Harris	
2008	Cuci	Jojo	
2008	Duyung	Kordi	
2008	Antoo Fighter: Amukan Drakulat!	Drakulat Van Listerbooy	
2008	Cinta U-Turn	Faiz	
2008	Apa Kata Hati?	Sophi	
2010	Andartu Terlampau... 21 Hari Mencari Suami!	Aziz Al-Biruni	
2010	Kapoww!	Astromen	
2010	Hantu Kak Limah Balik Rumah	Husin	
2012	Baik Giller!	Kimie	
2012	Berani Punya Budak	John	
2012	Leftwings	Himself	Special appearance
2013	Husin, Mon dan Jin Pakai Toncit	Husin	
2013	Bikers Kental	Eddie Guardo	
2013	Lemak Kampung Santan	Abu	
2014	Zombi Kilang Biskut	Husin	
2014	Dollah Superstar	Dollah Rimau	
2014	Ribbit	Kulup (voice)	Malay dubbed
2016	Warna Cinta Impian	Himself	
2016	Upin & Ipin Jeng Jeng Jeng!	Himself	
2017	Lebuhraya Ke Neraka	Bob	
2018	Hantu Kak Limah	Husin	
2018	Operasi X	Belut	
2019	Bikers Kental 2	Eddie Guardo	
2020	Rock 4: Rockers Never Dai	Himself	
2021	10 Tips Tipu Bini	Brother Love	Also as producer
2021	Kampong Pisang Musikal Raya Istimewa	Husin	
2021	Kampung Latah Kena Kuarantin	Dukun Palermo	Cameo appearance
2022	Seratus		Cameo appearance
2023	Didi & Friends The Movie	Tok Chip (voice)	
2023	Sue-On	Mat Dosa	As producer
2024	Rebel	Pak Long Biring	Also as director, original idea and executive producer

=== Telemovie ===
Year	Title	Role	TV channel
1992	Wajah Di Sebalik Tirai	Mokhtar	TV1
2010	Buta Warna	Amri	Astro Ria
2013	Malaikat Di Pintu	Zai	TV3
2014	Takhta 3 Ratu		Astro First Exclusive
2015	Aku Benci Raya	Amir	Astro Warna
2016	Dari Kerana Mata	Ramzi	HyppTV
2017	Kalut Nak Raya	Bobby	Astro Warna
2018	Studio Awie	Himself	TV3
2018	Berani Jadi Papa	Sani Joned	Astro First Exclusive
2021	Rumah Tok Wie	Tok Wie	Awesome TV

=== Television series ===
Year	Title	Role	TV channel	Notes
2000	Spanar Jaya	Himself	NTV7	Episode: "Takkan Kot... Awie"
2006–2007	Awie Records	Himself	Astro Ria	
2018	Mak Cun (Season 4)	Rock	TV3	
2018	Ammar & Opie	Tok Wie	TV3	
2021	Kampung Pisang Bersiri-siri	Husin	Astro Citra	Episode: "Husin Kembali Bersama Zombi"
2021	Semanis Senyumanmu	Himself	TV3	Special appearance
2022	Sudin dan Kaya	Samad	Awesome TV	
2022	Kids Nowadays	Jaafar	Astro Ria	

=== Television ===
Year	Title	Role	TV channel
2004	Akademi Fantasia season 2	Invited Artist	Astro Ria
2012	Maharaja Lawak Mega 2012	Permanent judge	Astro Warna
2013	Tunggu Sekejap	Host	TV3
2013	Maharaja Lawak Mega 2013	Invited Artist To Shiro	Astro Warna
2015	Juara Parodi	Invited Artist	Astro Warna
2016	Ceria Popstar	Permanent judge	Astro Ceria
2016	3 Juara	Permanent judge	TV3
2016	Joras & Star	Invited Artist	Astro Warna
2017	Rockanova 2017	Permanent judge	Astro Prima
2017	AF Megastar	Invited Artist	Astro Ria
2018	MeleTOP	Host with Erra Fazira	Astro Ria
2019	Maharaja Lawak Mega 2019	Invited Artist	Astro Warna
2019–2022	Muzikal Lawak Superstar	Permanent judge	Astro Warna
2020	Rumah No. 107	Invited Artist	Astro Warna
2020	Gegar Vaganza (Season 7)	Invited Artist	Astro Ria
2021	Sumbang Suara	Permanent judge	TV3
2021	Havoc Nak Raya	Invited Artist	TV3
2022	Mic On! (Season 2)	Jury	Awesome TV

== Discography ==
=== Album studio (With Wings) ===
Year	Title	Sales
1987	Belenggu Irama: Album studio; Released : 1987; Label : ASP	180,000 Unit
1988	Hukum Karma: Album studio; Released : 1988; Label : ASP	180,000 Unit
1990	Teori Domino: Album studio; Released : 1990; Label : Fly Wings & BMG	200,000 Unit
1991	Jerangkung Dalam Almari: Album studio; Released: 1991; Label: Fly Wings & BMG	200,000 Unit
1993	Bazooka Penaka: Album studio; Released: 1993; Format: Kaset; Label: Fly Wings & BMG	200,000 Unit
2002	Naga Kramat: Album studio; Released: 2002; Format: CD & Kaset; Label: BMG	50,000 Unit
2014	Menakluk Kosmos: Album studio; Released: 2014; Format: CD; Label: KRU Records	15,000 Unit

=== Album solo studio ===
Year	Title	Sales
1994	Awie: Album studio; Released: 1994; Format: CD, Kaset; Label: BMG Music	220,000 unit
1996	O-Tak: Album studio; Released: 1996; Format: CD, Kaset; Label: BMG Music	150,000 unit
1998	Satu: Album studio; Released: 1998; Format: CD, Kaset; Label: BMG Music	50,000 unit
2000	Rentap: Album studio; Released: 2000; Format: CD, Kaset; Label: BMG Music	25,000 unit
2005	Santai: Album studio; Released: 2005; Format: CD, Kaset; Label: EMI Music	

== Honour ==
- Pahang
  - Knight Companion of the Order of the Crown of Pahang (DIMP) – Dato' (2017)
