= Erra Fazira =

Malaysian actress and singer

- عيرا فزيرا
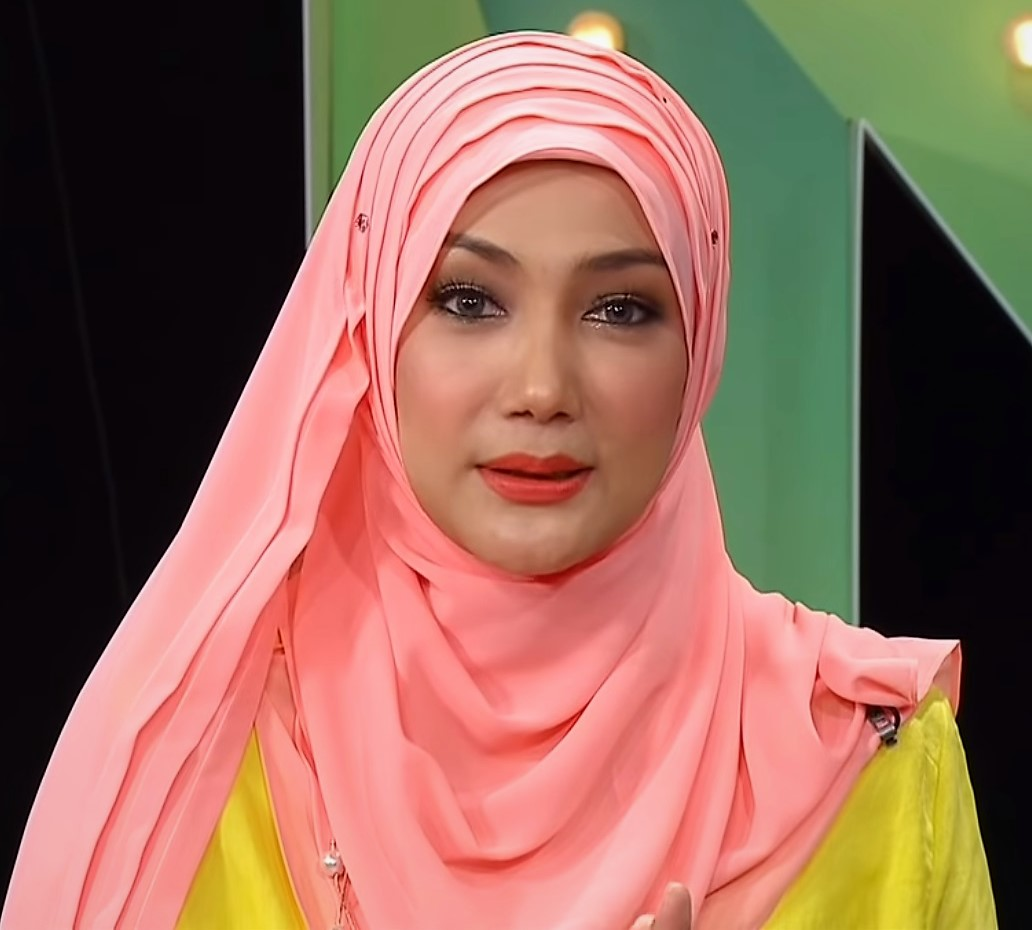
- Fazira on MeleTOP in 2015
- Born: Fazira binti Wan Chek; 9 February 1974 (age 52); Rawang, Selangor, Malaysia
- Occupations: Actress; singer; television host; producer; radio presenter
- Years active: 1992–present
- Spouses: Yusry Abdul Halim (m. 2003; div. 2006) Engku Emran Engku Zainal Abidin (m. 2007; div. 2014) Mohamad Ezwan Mohamad Zain (m. 2025)
- Children: Engku Aleesya Engku Emran (biological-daughter)
- Musical career
- Genres: Pop; R&B; ballad
- Instrument: Vocals
- Label: Sony Music

Erra Fazira (born Fazira Wan Chek; 9 February 1974) is a Malaysian actress, singer, fashion model, television host, producer and beauty pageant titleholder who was crowned Miss Malaysia World 1992.

She rose to fame in the early and mid 1990s following her roles in Sembilu, Sembilu 2, Maria Mariana and Pasrah. She received critical acclaim and a Best Actress in a Leading Role trophy at Malaysia Film Festival twice for her portrayal of inspiring young sales girl and part-time student Nurul Ain in Soal Hati (2001) and as Nora, an old lady with dark past in the film Hingga Hujung Nyawa (2005). She received another three Malaysia Film Festival's Best Actress award nomination for her performance in Soalnya Siapa? (2003), Persona Non Grata (2006), and Anak (2008).

== Early life ==
Fazira was born in Sungai Choh, a small town in Rawang, Selangor the first child and the only daughter of Wan Chek and Azizah Zaik. Her parents were Malays. Fazira was an active student during her school days and developed a passion for acting, which she showed an interest in at a very early age. She also joined many school's clubs and societies such as Scouting, St John Ambulance of Malaysia, the English Language Society and the Culture Club. She was also an active sports student back then and represented herself and her school in Netball. She said that the learning and involvement she did in those clubs played an important role in her later career. Fazira attended several different schools including SM Puteri Titiwangsa, Kuala Lumpur.

== Career ==
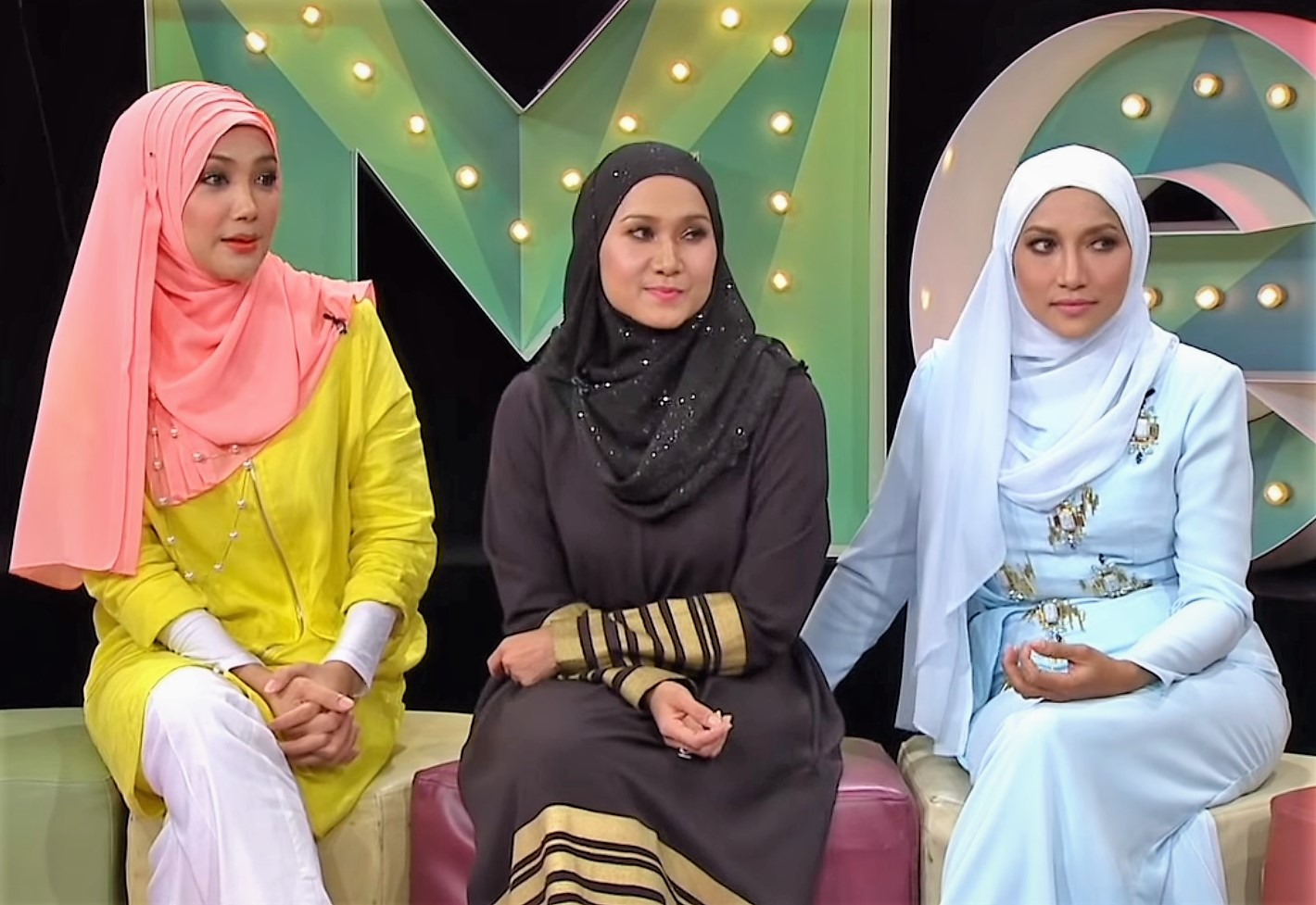
Left to right:Fazira, Amy Mastura and Ziana Zain on MeleTOP in 2015.

=== Beauty pageant (1992) ===
At the age of 18, Fazira went to take part in the 1992 Malaysian beauty pageant after being persuaded by her aunt. She competed against thirteen others and eventually won the title of Miss Malaysia World 1992. As Miss Malaysia, Fazira went on to compete in the Miss World 1992 pageant, representing Malaysia which was held in Sun City, South Africa. She secured the 15th place during the preliminary competition.

=== Music career (1993–2007) ===
In 1994, after the release of her first feature film Sembilu, Fazira released her eponymous self-titled EP under Polygram Records. She later records two albums with the label before leaving Polygram to join Sony Music. Her first studio album is Aku dan Dia (1995) with its hits single "Yang Terindah Hanyalah Sementara", and followed by 2.5 Sayang in 1996 with "Pertemuan" released as single.

In 1998, she went on to embark her first solo concert, Konsert Live Bersama Erra Fazira – Kini which took place at the Dewan Merdeka, Putra World Trade Centre (PWTC; now known as World Trade Centre Kuala Lumpur or WTCKL) and attended by 2,000 fans.

A year later, in 1999, Fazira's fourth album and the first with Sony Music, Kini was released. Her 2001 single, "Sandarkan" along with Siti Nurhaliza’s song, "Lakaran Kehidupan" (from Siti's seventh album, Safa) was chosen by TV3 as part of the network's 3D campaign. Music videos for both songs were filmed in 3D where TV3 viewers wearing 3D glasses while watching it.

In 2002, her fifth album, Sampai Bertemu was released, followed by sixth album, Kini Kembali (2004). She is one of few Malaysian artists who contributed a special song titled "Suluhkan Sinar" ("Shine the Light"). Produced by KRU and released in January 2005, the song was specially dedicated to the victims of the 2004 Indian Ocean earthquake and tsunami. In 2006, Fazira released her seventh and last studio album, Ya Atau Tidak.

Fazira released a new single, "Menangkah Cinta" in 2019. It was her official recording release in 13 years since her last album, Ya Atau Tidak.

=== Acting career (1994–present) ===
Fazira was approached by director, Yusof Haslam, to star as the lead role in Sembilu. The film opened in cinema on 18 August 1994. The film also marked the first time Erra worked together with her then former dating partner, Awie. Other films roles followed including a sequel of Sembilu the following year, where Fazira reprised her role as Rosmawati Sofian.

From 1996 until 2000, Fazira starred in four of Yusof's directed films including the portraying of Maria Zakaria in both Maria Mariana and its sequel Maria Mariana II. In the 2000 film Soal Hati, Fazira starred played the character of Nurul Ain. Fazira won the Malaysia Film Festival Award for Best Actress for her role in the film.

Starting 2001, Fazira began to work with many different directors for her films including Ahmad Idham for Mr. Cinderella (2002) and Abdul Razak Mohaideen for Cinta Kolestrol (2003) among others. In 2004, Fazira went on to star opposite her then former husband, Yusry bin Abdul Halim, in the 2004 film Hingga Hujung Nyawa, also directed by Abdul Razak. Through this film, Fazira once again was awarded the Malaysia Film Festival Award for Best Actress as for the portrayal of Nora Halim in the movie.

In 2002, Fazira acted in a telemovie and hosted the show, Fesyen Tempo. From 2018 to 2021, she became part of the cast member of longest-running Malaysian action drama series, Gerak Khas, playing the role of ASP Jeslina. She later reprise her role in the series' spin-off, Gerak Khas: Undercover.

== Personal life ==
Erra Fazira married Malaysian singer and actor Yusry Abd Halim from KRU, on 15 June 2003, Yusry's 30th birthday. They officially divorced on 16 June 2006.

She later married former Suria FM Chief Operating Officer, Engku Emran Engku Zainal Abidin from 2007 to 2014, with whom she had a daughter. They later divorced on 18 January 2014.

== Discography ==
=== Studio albums ===
- Erra Fazira (1994)
- Aku dan Dia (1995)
- Menyanyi Bersama (1996)
- 2.5 Sayang (1997)
- Kini (1999)
- Sampai Bertemu (2002)
- Kini Kembali (2003)
- Ya atau Tidak (2006)

=== Compilation albums ===
- Koleksi Klasik (1998)
- Best of Erra Fazira (2001)
- Koleksi Istimewa Buatmu (2001)
- Keunggulan Erra Fazira (2007)

== Filmography ==
=== Film ===
| Year | Title | Role | Notes |
|---|---|---|---|
| 1994 | Sembilu | Wati | Debut film appearances |
| 1995 | Sembilu II | Wati | |
| 1996 | Maria Mariana | Maria Zakaria | |
| 1996 | Tragedi Oktober | Wati | Nominated, Best Actress – 13th Malaysia Film Festival |
| 1997 | Gemilang | Julia | |
| 1998 | Maria Mariana II | Maria Zakaria | |
| 2000 | Pasrah | Farah Dhiba | |
| 2000 | Soal Hati | Nurul Ain | Won Best Actress – 15th Malaysia Film Festival; Won Best Actress – Anugerah Skrin TV3 |
| 2001 | Gerak Khas The Movie | Inspector Shafikah | |
| 2001 | Putih | Bawang Putih (voice) | Animation film |
| 2002 | Mr. Cinderella | Puteri Megawati Darul Kasih | |
| 2002 | Soalnya Siapa? | Nurul Ain | Nominated, Best Actress – 16th Malaysia Film Festival |
| 2003 | Gila Gila Pengantin | Aliah Hamdan | |
| 2003 | Janji Diana | Diana Murad | |
| 2003 | Cinta Kolestrol | Fazira Osman / Erra | |
| 2003 | Mr. Cinderella 2 | Puteri Megawati Darul Kasih | |
| 2003 | MX3 | Herself | Guest appearance |
| 2004 | Kuliah Cinta | Johanna Abdul Rahman (Jojo) | |
| 2004 | Hingga Hujung Nyawa | Nora Halim | Won, Best Actress – 18th Malaysia Film Festival |
| 2004 | 7 Perhentian | Sue | |
| 2004 | I Know What You Did Last Raya | Dr Mira | |
| 2005 | Potret Mistik | Kartini | |
| 2005 | Sembilu 2005 | Teacher Ira | |
| 2005 | Lady Boss | Salmi | |
| 2005 | Gila Gila Pengantin Popular | Sheera Mustapha | |
| 2005 | KL Menjerit 1 | Nina | |
| 2006 | Castello | Chalita | |
| 2006 | Persona Non Grata | Hey | Nominated, Best Actress – 19th Malaysia Film Festival |
| 2007 | Qabil Khusry Qabil Igam | Karisma Saat | |
| 2008 | Cuci | Siti Jasmin Rahim (CJ) | |
| 2008 | Anak | Hasnita | Nominated, 21st Best Actress – Malaysia Film Festival |
| 2008 | Los dan Faun | Puan Jasmine Al Sogood | |
| 2009 | Sifu & Tongga | Fatimah Omar (Tammy) | |
| 2010 | Andartu Terlampau – 21 Hari Mencari Suami | Markonah Rempeyek | |
| 2011 | Hidden | Dian | Hollywood production |
| 2012 | Ngorat | Keyra | |
| 2013 | Longkai | Zarina | |
| 2016 | Warna Cinta Impian | Erra | |
| 2017 | Soulmate Hingga Ke Jannah | Ira | |
| 2018 | Hantu Kak Limah | Wati | Special appearance |
| 2018 | Polis Evo 2 | SAC Dato' Azizat | |
| 2019 | Wangi | Nor | |
| 2020 | Bikin Filem | Datin Azizah | |
| 2022 | Kongsi Raya | Sarah | |
| 2022 | Rumah | Maya | |
| 2023 | Sue-On | Cik Nab | |
| 2024 | Harimau Malaya: The Untold Story | Datin Norliza | |

=== Telemovie ===
| Year | Title | Role | TV channel |
|---|---|---|---|
| 2002 | Siapa Mau Potong Baju? | Herself | TV2 |
| 2008 | Joe & Faridah | Faridah | Astro Ria |
| 2009 | Bonanza | Mastura | Astro Prima |
| 2009 | Cinta Lelong | Emma | Astro Ria |
| 2010 | 30 Hari Mengenal Cinta | | Astro Ria |
| 2010 | Selamat Tinggal Alexandria | | Astro Prima |
| 2010 | Pontianak Kampung Batu | Tira / Pontianak | Astro Ria |
| 2011 | Hantu Susu | Tira / Pontianak | Astro Ria |
| 2011 | Pontianak Beraya Di Kampung Batu | Tira / Pontianak | Astro Ria |
| 2011 | Sanggul Beracun | Siti Aminah | Astro Citra |
| 2011 | Mak OK Jer! | | Astro Prima |
| 2012 | Parut Asyikin | Nur Asyikin | Astro Citra |
| 2012 | Pontianak Masih Beraya Di Kampung Batu | Tira / Pontianak | Astro Ria |
| 2012 | Hantu Susu Kembali | Tira / Pontianak | Astro Ria |
| 2015 | Aku Benci Raya | | Astro Ria |

=== Television series ===
| Year | Title | Role | TV channel |
|---|---|---|---|
| 2008 | Mertua VS Menantu | Nurul Ain | Astro Prima |
| 2009 | Kasih Tercipta | Lisa | Astro Prima |
| 2009 | Mertua VS Menantu (Season 2) | Nurul Ain | Astro Prima |
| 2011 | Kelaasss Kau Maria! | Meera | Astro Ria |
| 2012 | Mana Hilangnya Juwita | Julia | Astro Ria |
| 2013 | Ammara Batrisya | Batrisya | TV9 |
| 2013 | Nur Melinda | Cikgu Nur | Astro Prima |
| 2016 | Rumi & Jawi | Keisya | Astro Prima |
| 2016 | Tuan Anas Mikael 5 Hari Beraya | Nina | Astro Ria |
| 2017 | Dia Bidadariku | Suri | Astro Ria |
| 2017 | My Darling Inspektor Daniel | Maria | Astro Ria |
| 2018–2021 | Gerak Khas | ASP Jeslina | TV2, TV3 |
| 2018 | Mak Cun (Season 4) | Olio | TV3 |
| 2018 | Dian | Eva Raisha | NTV7 |
| 2021–2022 | Gerak Khas Undercover | Jeslina | TV3 |

=== Television ===
| Year | Program | Role | TV channel |
|---|---|---|---|
| 2001–2002 | Fesyen Tempo | Host | TV1 |
| 2009 | Gugu Gaga Erra | Reality television series, featuring Erra, Engku Emran and their daughter Engku Aleesya | Astro Ria |
| 2009 | Pentas Akhir Anak Wayang (Season 1) | Judge on the first series (with Nasha Aziz & Rashid Sibir) | Astro Ria |
| 2009 | Dunia Wanita | Hosting with Umie Aida, also as a producer | TV1 |
| 2010 | Tiger Futbol Starz | Host | Astro Ria |
| 2011 | Mentor (Season 5) | Reality singing competition with protege Salma A Asis (Won the competition with Salma | TV3 |
| 2011 | VOKAL "Bukan Sekadar Rupa | Judge (with Azmeer) | TV3 |
| 2011 | Pilih Kasih (Season 3) | Judge (with Umie Aida and Rosyam Nor) | TV2 |
| 2012–2015 | Primadona | As talk show host (with Ziela Jalil, Raja Azura and Rozita Che Wan) | Astro Prima |
| 2016 | Sepahtu Reunion Live | Zulaikha | Astro Warna |
| 2018 | Sepahtu Reunion Al-Raya | Penjaga | Astro Warna |
| 2019 | Sepahtu Reunion Live | Julia | Astro Warna |
| 2019 | Cinta Overhaul Aidilfitri | Laila | Astro Warna |
| 2019 | Arena Panggang Warna Live | | Astro Warna |
| 2019–2020 | Mingguan Wanita | Host | Astro Prima |
| 2023 | Mic ON! Selebriti | Jury | Awesome TV |
| 2023–2024 | The Masked Singer Malaysia (season 4) | Jury | Astro Warna |
| 2024 | Nasi Lemak Kopi O | Host | TV9 |
| 2024 | Melodi | Host | TV3 |
| 2024–present | Borak SeeNi | Host | Astro Prima |

== Radiography ==
=== Radio ===
| Year | Title | Station |
|---|---|---|
| 28 August – 20 October 2023 | Duo Sinar | Sinar |
