= KL Special Force =

2018 film by Syafiq Yusof

- Film poster
- Directed by: Syafiq Yusof
- Written by: Syafiq Yusof
- Produced by: Yusof Haslam; Syafiq Yusof; Dato’ Wira Mohd Fadino Khairuman
- Starring: Rosyam Nor; Syamsul Yusof; Fattah Amin
- Cinematography: Azami Alias
- Edited by: Syafiq Yusof
- Music by: Ken Hor; Lo Shi Seng
- Production companies: Skop Productions; Damofa Productions; Viper Studios
- Release date: 8 March 2018
- Running time: 106 minutes
- Country: Malaysia
- Language: Malay
- Budget: MYR 4 million
- Box office: MYR 12.1 million

KL Special Force is a 2018 Malaysian Malay-language action thriller film directed by Syafiq Yusof. The film stars Rosyam Nor, Syamsul Yusof, and Fattah Amin. It was released on 8 March 2018 and was co-produced by Skop Productions, Damofa Productions, and Viper Studios.

== Plot ==
A Royal Malaysian Police special task force, led by Roslan, is tasked with bringing down a notorious mafia group known as the Gang Anarchist, led by Asyraff, in Kuala Lumpur. A young policeman named Zul is recruited into the task force to assist Roslan in solving the case. However, the situation becomes increasingly complicated as Asyraff begins manipulating the emotions, minds, and sympathies of both Roslan and Zul.

The tension escalates when Anarchist robs Dato Meor's Damofa Bank, revealing a shocking secret. What is this hidden truth? And how will the police outsmart the Gang Anarchist to restore order?

Roslan receives a call from Asyraff, who informs him that he has arrived at Roslan's house and is planning to kill Diana. Panicked, Roslan rushes home and tries to contact Diana. However, Diana calls him instead, then retreats to her room to pray to God. As Asyraff prepares to kill her, he notices Diana praying and, moved by the sight, decides to leave the house without harming her.

Meanwhile, Zul handcuffs Raj and escapes from the police station to save Mia. As he tries to contact Mia, he is run over by a lorry driven by Asyraff. Asyraff then kills several police officers and captures Zul.

At the warehouse, Zul is tied up by Asyraff alongside his fiancée, Mia, and Dato Mior. Asyraff reveals to Zul that his mother was raped by Dato Mior. Seeking revenge, Asyraff and Rizal hire an assassin to kill Dato Mior. However, during the assassination attempt, the assassin is shot dead by Roslan.

Asyraff explains his plan to "change the world" and tries to persuade Zul to join his side. Despite this, Asyraff ultimately kills Dato Mior instead of sparing him. The police surround the warehouse where Asyraff is holding the hostages. Zul and them, shooting Mia in the leg.

A fierce fight ensues between Zul and Asyraff, during which Asyraff threatens Mia with a gun. Roslan and his squad, along with Asyraff's mother, watch the standoff. Asyraff's mother pleads with him to stop, but Asyraff, determined not to lose, demands a helicopter, counting to three as a final warning. When the helicopter doesn't arrive, Asyraff attempts to execute Mia but is shot dead by the squad members before he can pull the trigger.

Zul is sent to a mental hospital. Roslan visits him and apologizes for doubting him. He then shares a profound thought, saying, "This world will not be destroyed by those who commit evil, but by those who witness evil and choose to do nothing."

== Cast ==
- Rosyam Nor as Roslan: The leader of the KL Special Force.
- Fattah Amin as Zul: A rookie member of the KL Special Force.

=== Anarchist Gang ===
- Syamsul Yusof as Asyraff: The leader of the Anarkis Gang.
- Mustaqim Bahadon as Rizal: Asyraff's brother.
- Josiah Hogan as Burn: A member of the Anarkis Gang.
- Ramona Zamzam as Nadia: A member of the Anarkis Gang.

=== Supporting actor ===
- Mahmud Ali Bashah as Dato' Meor: The owner of Damofa Bank.
- Shaharuddin Thamby as Superintendent Azmi: A high-ranking police officer.
- Esma Danial as Inspector Zamri: A member of the police force.
- Puteri Balqis as Amira: The daughter of Roslan and Diana.
- Sabrina Ali as Diana: Roslan's wife.
- Tania Hudson as Mia: Dato' Meor's daughter and Zul's fiancée.
- Liza Abdullah as Asyraf and Rizal's Mother: Former mistress of Dato' Meor.
- Roslan Saleh as the Assassin: Hired to kill Dato' Meor.
- Razib Salimin as Azman: An undercover cop (also a stuntman in the film).
- Siraj Al Shagoff as Raj: A supporting character.
- Ruzzlan Abdullah Shah as Kevin: A supporting character.
- Dato’ Wira Mohd Fadino Khairuman as Dino: A supporting character.
- Izzy Reef as Teenage Ashraff: A younger version of Asyraff.
- Jali Masari as Teenage Rizal: A younger version of Rizal.
- Mior Farez as a Security Guard in Disguise: A minor but key character.
- Wan Raja as Dato Meor's Secretary and Henchman: A close associate of Dato' Meor.

== Production ==
KL Special Force was announced in May 2016. Directed by Syafiq Yusof, it marks his seventh film, following SAM (2012), Abang Long Fadil (2014), Villa Nabila (2015), Mat Moto (2016), Desolasi (2016), and Abang Long Fadil 2 (2017). The film also represents Skop Productions’ 39th release and serves as Fattah Amin's film debut. Filming took place in July and August 2016 across locations in Kuala Lumpur, Tambun (Perak), and Putrajaya.

== Reception ==
KL Special Force was released on 8 March 2018 and became a commercial success. By 4 April 2018, the film had grossed over RM12.1 million.

During the release, some people initiated a boycott campaign against the movie after one of the directors of DAMOFA Productions was accused of involvement in a Ponzi scheme.

== Soundtrack ==
The theme song of the movie is "Selamat Tinggal Masa" (Goodbye Times), sung by Black Hanifah featuring Syamsul Yusof. It was written and composed by Syamsul and his cousin, Dr. Anwar Fazal.
