= Sheriff: Narko Integriti =

2024 film by Syafiq Yusof

- Theatrical release poster
- Directed by: Syafiq Yusof
- Written by: Nazifdin Nasrudin; Syafiq Yusof
- Screenplay by: Syafiq Yusof
- Story by: Yusof Haslam
- Produced by: Yusof Haslam; Raja Jastina Arshad
- Starring: Zul Ariffin; Syafiq Kyle; Aaron Aziz; Elizabeth Tan; Azira Shafinaz
- Cinematography: Rahimi Maidin
- Edited by: Izaq Yuzaini; Nazifdin Nasrudin; Syafiq Yusof
- Music by: Sham Stalin; Latt Faizal; Ken Hor; Aziem Rashidi; Reza Ramsey
- Production companies: Skop Productions; Astro Shaw
- Distributed by: Astro Shaw
- Release dates: 18 April 2024 (Malaysia, Brunei & Singapore); 23 April 2024 (Indonesia); 6 June 2024 (Hong Kong)
- Running time: 134 minutes
- Country: Malaysia
- Languages: Malay; English; Mandarin
- Budget: RM6 million
- Box office: RM63.2 million

Sheriff: Narko Integriti (also known as Sheriff) is a 2024 Malaysian Malay-language action thriller film directed and screenplay by Syafiq Yusof based on story by his father, Yusof Haslam who also produced the film with co-produced and distributed by Skop Productions and Astro Shaw. Starring Zul Ariffin as the titular character, and co-starring Syafiq Kyle, Aaron Aziz, Elizabeth Tan and Azira Shafinaz.

The film ran its official photography for 81 days starting February to May 2023, right after the release of Polis Evo 3 including in Bandar Malaysia and the Klang Valley, including Kuala Lumpur and Selangor.

The film received huge positive reviews from critics and filmmaker for its direction, writing, casting, cinematography and plot twist. it grossed over 64 million against the budget 6 million ringgit, it held for record second highest grossing local film in Malaysia until being surpassed by Blood Brothers and Papa Zola The Movie in 2025. A sequel has already been planned by Syafiq after the box office success from this film.

== Plot ==
Internal police investigator Sheriff Hussein and his team are assigned to find the Meth Killer, a vigilante serial killer who has been murdering associates of drug kingpin Tony Ifrit and whose latest victim was the corrupt head of the Narcotics Department. Believing the Meth Killer is himself a member of the Narcotics Department given the killer's inside knowledge of Tony's organisation, Sheriff becomes suspicious of narcotics officer Nazri, who works with his sister Syazlin in the department and whose fiancée, an undercover policewoman, was found out by Tony before being raped and killed by him.

To get Sheriff off his tail, Nazri convinces his informant Firdaus to commit his next murder to provide an alibi for him. Firdaus is soon identified and captured by the police and in the interrogation room Nazri tells him to stay silent using Morse code; however an agitated Firdaus tries to escape and is shot and killed. Nazri becomes haunted by his death and visions of his fiancée, as well as his murder victims, but refuses to turn himself in.

After discovering the high failure rate of the department's operations, Sheriff suspects that Tony has a mole in Narcotics. The mole is revealed to be CID officer Jennifer, who works for Tony to secure a better childhood for her young son, and reveals to him that the Meth Killer is still out there. Frustrated by the killer disrupting his drug operation, Tony kidnaps Sheriff to find out who the Meth Killer is. Sheriff provides him with several leads but also deduces that not only is Jennifer the mole but there are actually two moles in the Narcotics Department before Tony releases him. Jennifer later approaches Nazri, revealing to him that she is Tony's mole and that she knows he is the Meth Killer. Telling him that she supports his actions, Jennifer offers Nazri the chance to get close to Tony, who ends up taking him hostage.

Tony, led to believe by Jennifer that Nazri is not the killer, demands that the police hand over the Meth Killer in exchange for Nazri's life and that of Jennifer, whose kidnapping Tony has faked. Sheriff convinces Syazlin to pose as the Meth Killer while wearing a hidden tracker, and she is taken by Tony's men. Following the tracker, the police raid Tony's hideout but Sheriff's team are ambushed trying to find Jennifer. In the chaos, Jennifer frees Nazri who finds and brutally kills Tony. However, now aware that she was the one who blew his fiancée's cover, Nazri goes after Jennifer next, but Syazlin holds him at gunpoint, having realised that he is the Meth Killer and demanding he surrender. When Jennifer tries to reach for her gun, Nazri shoots at her, leading Syazlin to shoot and kill her brother. Syazlin is then shot by Farouk, Tony's second mole in the department, who Jennifer kills to cover up her involvement before Sheriff's team reaches them.

In the aftermath Jennifer is lauded as a hero; however she discovers that Syazlin has survived her injuries, leaving her the last witness to her betrayal. Jennifer slips into Syazlin's hospital room and poisons her drinking water but is surprised by Sheriff, who confronts her with evidence of her working for Tony. Believing that her son will not be safe if she remains alive knowing what she knows, Jennifer commits suicide, entrusting Sheriff to raise her son as his own. Afterwards, Syazlin recovers from her injuries and resigns from the Narcotics Department to join Sheriff's team. The film ends with Sheriff and Syazlin confronting a corrupt judge who had been turning a blind eye to Tony's crimes.

== Cast ==
=== Main cast ===
- Zul Ariffin as Sheriff / Sheriffuddin Hussein, an officer from the Integrity Department (real life of Integrity and Standards Compliance Department (ISCD) of the RMP) who goes after police officers suspected of corruption
  - Mikael Noah as Young Sheriff
- Syafiq Kyle as Nazri / the Meth Killer, a young officer from the Narcotics Department and younger brother of Syazlin who is secretly a vigilante serial killer going after associates of Tony Ifrit
- Aaron Aziz as Tony Ifrit, a ruthless and dangerous methamphetamine drug kingpin
- Elizabeth Tan as Jennifer Wong, a corrupt CID officer from the RMP and main mole of Tony Ifrit
- Azira Shafinaz as Syazlin, a female officer from the Narcotics Department and older sister of Nazri
- Amir Nafis as Farouk Mahmud, a narcotics officer
- Kodi Rasheed as Firdaus, a Malaysian Army veteran and Nazri's informant
- Shaharuddin Thamby as Superintendent Malik
- Esma Daniel as Superintendent Roslan, head of the Integrity Department
- Kamal Affandi Hashim as DSP Hafsham, Superintendent Malik's successor
- Natasya Mahyan as Wani, Nazri's deceased fiancée
- Hazama Azmi as Amirul Asyraff (cameo), a corrupt police officer
- Azri Iskandar as Hussein Osman, Sheriff's father and a corrupt police officer
- Hasnul Rahmat as Syed Rahman, a corrupt Chief Judge of Malaya
- Zen Ng as Hong
- Meynillen Thamil Selvan as Nagarajah
- Siraj Alsagoff as Arkash

=== Additional casts ===
- Azalizan Azaman as Faizal
- Mohd Khairulanuar Zulkifli as Razak
- Mohamad Fadhil Haniff as Kapak
- Hazly Hassan as Tony's henchman
- Nizam Bahar as Tony's henchman 2
- Joannes Anak Mosas as Tony's henchman 3
- Akmal Asyraf as Tony's gang
- Muhammad Azri Mokhtar as Tony's gang 2
- Muhammad Farhan Ahmad Fauzi as Sergeant Latiff

== Production ==
Sheriff: Narko Integriti is the third police-themed film directed by Syafiq Yusof after KL Special Force (2018) and Polis Evo 3 (2023). It marks the fourth collaboration between Syafiq and Zul Ariffin after Misteri Dilaila (2019), Penunggang Agama (2021) and Penunggang Agama 2 (2021). The other actors involved in this film are Syafiq Kyle, Azira Shafinaz, Elizabeth Tan, Aaron Aziz, Shaharuddin Thamby, Kodi Rasheed, Esma Daniel, Hazama Azmi and Azri Iskandar. Shaharuddin and Esma previously acted together in KL Special Force, while Elizabeth starred in Misteri Dilaila and Abang Long Fadil 3 (2022), both directed by Syafiq. This film is also a project between Syafiq Kyle and Azira Shafinaz together after they previously appeared in television series, including Married Tapi Benci (2016) and One Cent Thief (2022). Azhan Rani was originally intended to be cast as Tony Ifrit, but was replaced by Aaron Aziz after being dropped from The Original Gangster (2024) due to some friction between Aaron and Syamsul Yusof. Aaron reveals that Syamsul told him to inject for losing weight at first place.

Syafiq added that he grew up watching police dramas and films, not just Gerak Khas but also Hollywood films such as Lethal Weapon and Die Hard.

"Sheriff is based on real police stories in the West as well as Hong Kong and back home. I made sure that we got a star-studded cast of talented and popular names."

He also reveals that Syerif (Sheriff in Malay) was a working title for production.

The film's principal photography ran for 81 days around Klang Valley from February to May 2023, right after the release of Polis Evo 3, also directed by Syafiq. The film was released in Malaysia, Brunei and Singapore cinema on 18 April 2024, a week after Eid al-Fitr.

Syafiq admitted that his father really liked the film he directed, but did not have the opportunity to show this film to his brother, Syamsul Yusof. Syafiq told Harian Metro that this was the hardest film he ever directed not because of PDRM, but LPF's action on the film once its completed.

After the trailer uploaded, some people furious after shows "a whole" plot of the film, but Syafiq later deny it. He reveal that he decided to reveal the "Meth Killer" (portrayed by Syafiq Kyle) to use reversed concept of "Whodunnit" or "Howcatchem". He hopes that it can attracted audience to watch the film as it was Syafiq's first experimental with the concept.

Faizal Noar, who previously worked with Syafiq Yusof as assistant director for Abang Long Fadil 3 (2022) and Hassan Muthalib were mentioned in the film for "creating" the fictional film for Sheriff, titled Hujan di Kuala Lumpur (Rain in Kuala Lumpur), in which used as an evidence from Nazri for what he do on the night when he was asked by Sheriff.

== Release ==
=== Rating ===
The film was originally rated 13 by the Film Censorship Board of Malaysia (LPF), but was re-rated to 16, in which Syafiq had no choice but to agree on LPF's decision. He stated that the film does not have extreme scenes, but he thinks that the final rating was given due to the film's topic. This film was later given a green light to be released in theaters.

=== Release and promotional campaigns ===
The official trailer of the film was released on YouTube by Skop Productions and Astro Shaw on 22 March 2024, in which it is scheduled to be release in Malaysia and Singapore cinemas on 18 April 2024, a week after Eid al-Fitr. The film was later released in Indonesia by CBI Pictures on 23 May 2024, titled Sheriff: Narcotics & Integrity. It received positive reaction by Joko Anwar as Joko himself was Syafiq's idol.

The film was scheduled to screened in Hong Kong on 6 June 2024, distributed by Universal Pictures (Note: It was originally planned to be distributed by Warner Bros. Hong Kong branch, but was later distributed by Universal Pictures.) Hong Kong branch with original dialogue. The film will set become Skop Productions' first film to screened there and Astro Shaw's second 2024 international release after Mechamato Movie in Japan. Originally, the film managed to attracted Warner Bros. staff who have invited to gala night in GSC Mid Valley Megamall. According to Yusof Haslam, Warner Bros. Hong Kong staff approved the film to be screened, in which the title of the film was changed to Mass Killer "Sheriff" (Chinese: 警長：抓内鬼) with original audio and bilingual subtitles (English and Mandarin).

To promote the film, Skop Productions teamed up with Secret Recipe to give away 15 pairs of gala night premiere tickets, which is a contest called Snap & Win. Malaysian cinema chain Golden Screen Cinemas is giving out Raya packets in selected cinemas starting from 2 April. TGV Cinemas ran an "open house" for both Dancing Village: The Curse Begins and this film, priced at RM75. Malaysian distributor of this film, Astro Shaw is giving out Raya packets in multiple bazaars in conjunction to the release of the film.

Syafiq cautioned parents about bringing children to watch the movie due to its 16 rating, in which caused by viral TikTok videos showing minors present at showings.

== Reception ==
=== Box office ===
Sheriff gained more than RM1 million for early screening on 17 April across Malaysia. It was later increased to RM6.4 million, thus beats out War On Terror: KL Anarchy as highest 16-rated Malaysian film. It ends on RM11.4 million in weekend thanks to magnificent support. Just a day later, the film increased by RM5 million to RM16.4 million by Sunday afternoon. The film ends a week cycle by collecting RM22.1 million, just behind Polis Evo 3 (RM25 million) and Mat Kilau (RM23 million). It later raised to RM28 million after 9 days of screening across three countries. The film become Malaysia's number one box office film after beating out Godzilla x Kong: The New Empire and Money Not Enough 3 by collecting RM31 million in two weeks, thus beats out BoBoiBoy Movie 2 (2019) and Air Force The Movie (2022). The film was later increased to RM35.3 million, closed to total collection of Mechamato Movie (2022) co-produced by Astro Shaw. The film become Skop Productions' and Astro Shaw's second highest box office film, behind Polis Evo 3 (RM54 million) co-produced with Blackflag by collecting RM44.5 million. It later become their number one box office film after collecting RM60 million within one month, thus puts it as second highest-grossing film in Malaysia; behind Syamsul's Mat Kilau.

=== Critical response ===
The film receives huge positive reaction from critics and filmmaker for its direction, acting, script and camera movement especially Zul Ariffin and Syafiq Kyle. Casey written for her Casey Movie Mania states that the film was an engrossing mix of thriller and mystery. She also praised Izaq Yuzaini's editing for not dragging or overstay its welcome. She gave it 4 out of 5 stars.

Kiapbod on his retro perspective review wrote that the film was full of plot twist as the main ingredient in the film. He also praised actors' performance especially Syafiq after One Cent Thief (2022) and Polis Evo 3 (2023). Zhafvlog wrote in his Twitter that he felt palpitations due to its action, fighting scene especially by Zul and Aaron Aziz and epic shooting action. He gave 5 out of 5 infinity stars which also puts it as his favorite local film.

Azri Azizan wrote for World of Buzz praised the film after collecting RM6.4 million in 2 days by stating is as "doesn't have to be a comic book movie as long as the plot intrigues the audience and keeps them at the edge of their seats with the twists and turns".

The film also received positive outcome from Indonesian audience. Helmy Herlambang wrote for Kincir stated that the film managed to keep audience at the edge of their seat from beginning to the end.

Sheriff has become Yusof Haslam's best present for his 70th birthday. He told to Malay Mail,

"... with the economy not being so good now, I was a bit worried how the film will fare but with Allah's blessings, the film has been receiving an encouraging response and (for this) I am very grateful,".

“I am also grateful that my children (Syafiq Yusof and Syamsul Yusof) are very talented and Allah has given them a way to make their work easier and their works are widely accepted,”

“I cannot say that I expect a certain (box office) collection, but looking at the film's (Sheriff) momentum from day to day as well as from what netizens have to say, we can say that there is confidence...but we cannot know how far it can go in terms of is collections,"

— Son Shafiq's ‘Sheriff’ success a meaningful 70th birthday gift for Yusof Haslam

Vice President of Malay Nusantara Business and Head of Astro Shaw, Raja Jastina Raja Arshad who served as executive producer thank everyone who supported the film and stated that the film will create history for Malay films.

A viewer from Kelantan decide to fly to Negeri Sembilan for watch the film due to no cinema were placed there. A mosque organization parodied the film as "Meth Slipper" to remind everyone for not stealing slipper in mosque.

Syamsul Yusof, Syafiq's brother proud of Syafiq himself and remind everyone to support the film. Atiq Azman told Harian Metro that Sheriff was the beginning of phenomenal wave in Malaysian film industry and hoping that The Experts will have same box-office collection as Sheriff.

== Possible sequel ==
On 22 May, Syafiq Yusof announced the sequel of Sheriff to Harian Metro with Zul Ariffin and Azira Syafinaz set to reprise their roles. Syafiq told them that he currently planned to make a new idea for the sequel. It was later confirmed by other medias such as CNA Lifestyle and MalayMail.

== Controversies ==
=== Fake news about defamation of the Royal Malaysian Police ===
Syafiq debunked fake news alleging PDRM's investigation of Yusof for tarnishing their image, affirming on Twitter that the police granted permission for the film's production.

=== Failure in Indonesian theatres and internet debate between Malaysians and Indonesians ===
The film sparked an online debate when a viral video published on 2 June, by a Malaysian TikTok personality named Thaqib Shaker argued that Sheriff's failure to reach box office success in Indonesia is caused by a deep-rooted Indonesian nationalism that dislikes anything about Malaysia. Another TikTok video made on 3 June, by Syerleena Abdul Rashid, a Malaysian member of parliament (MP) from Bukit Bendera also went viral, said that the film's failure in Indonesia is "unfair" due to the dominance of Indonesian pop culture and creative industry in Malaysia without an "equal reciprocity" and promised to bring a motion to the Malaysian Parliament to limit the influx of Indonesian and foreign media. To the press, Syafiq accepted the fact that Sheriff did not make a significant success in the Indonesian theatres after being released back on 23 April and screened via CGV Cinemas Indonesia and has since been pulled down from screens earlier than the expected target.

The debate originally surfaced from X (formerly Twitter). On 31 May and 1 June, Syafiq published a series of posts on his official X account.

Syafiq Yusof
(@syafiqyusof)
tweeted:

Malay:

Filem Sheriff tidak mendapat sambutan di Indonesia. Jadi, banyak tayangan telah diturunkan secara drastik. Apa-apa pun, saya berterima kasih kepada CGV Cinemas kerana membuka pintu dan memberi peluang untuk filem Malaysia ditayangkan di sana 🙏. Terima Kasih Indonesia 🇲🇾❤️🇮🇩

31 May 2024

In the post, Syafiq said that Sheriff did not get a reception in Indonesia and the screening was pulled drastically. Malaysian netizens surged the comment section and scrutinised the cause of the film's general low reception in Indonesia. Malaysian netizens alleged that Indonesians were being unsupportive to Malaysia, overly nationalistic, or inherently disliked Malaysian films. The comment section became controversial when Malaysian netizens started to dehumanising Indonesian people, ranging from using various ethnic slurs, i.e. indon/indog, IQ 78/IQ gorilla (equating Indonesian average IQ to primates), konoha (a derogatory term of Indonesia, from a village mentioned in Naruto), babu (slave or servant), kuli Jawa (Javanese enslaved labour) etc.; insinuated that the film's low viewership was caused by poverty and lack of theatres; to disparaging Indonesian film industry to be of cheap, monotone, low quality, and inferior compared to Malaysia.

Both Syafiq posts on 31 May and 1 June were deleted due to the increasing amount of concerning comments from Malaysian netizens. The former post capture is still available from a Malaysian news report, while the latter detail is unavailable from internet history. To address the issue, on 1 June, Syafiq stated in his post that: "Forced to delete the previous tweet that blew up in such a harmful way. Too many comments causing hostility. Please be safe everyone."

Later, a post from an Indonesian X film forum that discussed the incident went viral. Indonesian netizens were enraged after knowing that Malaysian netizens accused Indonesians for being prejudiced and having hatred towards Malaysia, who blamed the film's failure due to various reasons, such as close-mindedness and assertion of poorer Indonesian film industry quality compared to Malaysia. Furthermore, Malaysian netizens accused the Indonesian people for being ultranationalist because of Soekarno's legacy of Indonesia-Malaysia confrontation, then throwing racist and ethnic slurs toward the Indonesian people (and Javanese people, the largest ethnic group in Indonesia), accused that Indonesians (and Javanese) hated Malays and having the so-called Jakarta-centric or Java-centric mindset, and assuming that Indonesians are of lower intelligence than Malaysians, which are stemmed from staunch anti-Indonesian sentiment. In the comment section of the post, Indonesians commented that the accusations and insults are ridiculous, irrelevant, hyperbolic, false, provocative, and racist towards the Indonesian and Javanese people.

Indonesian netizens responded to the accusation by telling that Sheriff's producer team did not even put an effort of marketing strategy at all to promote the film to the Indonesian mass and social media, thus caused the film to become unpopular to the public. They also denied the accusation of Indonesians' hatred towards Malaysia, claiming that Indonesians have always been open and supportive of Malaysian film industry, especially the cult following of Upin & Ipin and BoBoiBoy, two successful Malaysian animated film in Indonesia, since the debut. Additionally, netizens were also disgusted to the allegation that Indonesians were being ultranationalist or xenophobic, when in fact Indonesian reception to foreign media is more liberal, free, and open than Malaysian conservative Islamic society, which then Indonesian netizens argued that Malaysia was just projecting their own racism mentality that is deeply entrenched by Malay supremacy concept against "inferior" Indonesians. To beat the allegation, netizens commented by giving proof that a Thai film How To Make Millions Before Grandma Dies, another Southeast Asian film that is screened concurrently with Sheriff in Indonesia, received a remarkable success in Indonesian theatres, even to the point that the director appreciated the Indonesian public, concluding that it has nothing to do with excessive national pride.

Netizens explained that Indonesia has since experienced progress in film industry and advises Malaysia to introspect and upgrade theirs to match the Indonesian film industry's evergrowing quality and prominence in international stage, by comparing the worldwide success of The Raid, an Indonesian film with similar premise which was released far earlier in 2011, also other Indonesian action films that received global acknowledgements like The Big 4, The Night Comes for Us, 13 Bombs in Jakarta, Stealing Raden Saleh, and requested Malaysians to compete fairly and adhere to the principle of free market. People also added that Indonesians have no obligation to fulfill Malaysian expectation because a film reception is merely a matter of personal taste.

After the chaos, in an X thread, Syafiq released an apology statement to the dispute and to hold responsibility to his previously deleted posts that initially caused the blunder.

Syafiq Yusof (@syafiqyusof) tweeted: Malay: Sentimen yg mengatakan filem Sheriff tidak laku di Indonesia kerana mereka tidak sokong filem Malaysia adalah 100 peratus tidak benar! Kegagalan filem Sheriff di Indonesia adalah kegagalan saya sendiri. Tidak harus persalahkan sesiapa.🙏 5 June 2024	Syafiq Yusof (@syafiqyusof) tweeted: Malay: Rakyat Indonesia berHAK untuk memilih filem yg mahu dipertonton. Saya akui filem Sheriff masih jauh ketinggalan kalau dibandingkan dengan filem2 aksi Indonesia. Sekiranya sesebuah filem itu tidak laku di sesebuah tempat, itu bukan salah penonton tetapi salah pembikin. 🙏 5 June 2024	Syafiq Yusof (@syafiqyusof) tweeted: Malay: Saya yg harus bertanggungjawab atas kegagalan ini dan harus terus berusaha untuk memperbaiki kualiti filem saya di masa depan. Saya berterima kasih kepada negara Indonesia kerana memberi peluang untuk filem Sheriff ditayangkan di sana 🙏 5 June 2024

In the first post, he said that "the sentiments that said Sheriff didn't hit success in Indonesia because Indonesians didn't support Malaysian films are wrong". He admitted that the failure is caused purely by his own. In the second post, he stated that the Indonesian public is in a rightful way to choose films to watch freely and admitted that Sheriff did not yet satisfy the high Indonesian film industry standard, especially Indonesian action films, thus a films' failure is ought not to be blamed to the audience, but the filmmaker instead. In the final post, he concluded with a statement that he is responsible for the box office miss, promised to upgrade his prospective films, and thanked the Indonesian public for the opportunity to screen Sheriff there.
