= Syafiq Yusof =

Malaysian filmmaker and visual effects artist (born 1992)

- شفيق يوسف
- Born: Mohd Syafiq bin Mohd Yusof; 7 December 1992 (age 33); Kuala Lumpur, Malaysia
- Occupations: Film director, screenwriter, producer, actor
- Years active: 2008–present
- Spouse: Aisyah bin Zainal (m. 2014)
- Children: 3
- Parents: Yusof Haslam (father); Fatimah Ismail (mother)
- Relatives: Syamsul Yusof (brother)

Mohd Syafiq bin Mohd Yusof (born 7 December 1992) is a Malaysian filmmaker and visual effects artist. He is a younger brother of actor Syamsul Yusof and son of veteran actor Yusof Haslam. Initially began his career by making short films, his directorial debut, SAM: Saya Amat Mencintaimu was released in 2012. Since then, he directed eight notable films, almost all became commercial successes in his home country.

== Early life ==
Syafiq Yusof was born on 7 December 1992 in Kuala Lumpur. He hails from a family of filmmakers and actors. His older brother, Syamsul is an actor and film director who is well-known for directing horror film series Munafik and Munafik 2, as well as Mat Kilau (film), the latter of which currently ranks as the highest-grossing Malaysian made film. His cousins Rizal Ashreff, Sabrina Ali, Aliff Ali and Miller Khan are also actors. His father is a veteran actor turned film director cum producer, Yusof Haslam.

He attended Kuala Lumpur Metropolitan University College (now UNITAR University College Kuala Lumpur).

== Career ==
Hailing from the well-known Yusof family, Syafiq began his filmmaking career by making short films. SAM: Saya Amat Mencintaimu, his feature film directorial debut, starring Shaheizy Sam and Lisa Surihani, was released on 19 August 2012 during the Hari Raya Aidilfitri celebration. Also in the same year, he and his cousin, Rizal Ashreff co-directed Evolusi KL Drift: The Series, a TV series adaptation from 2008 film, Evolusi KL Drift directed by his brother, Syamsul Yusof, who reprised his role in the TV series.

On 11 January 2013, Syafiq and his two business partners set-up Viper Studios which specializes in film production, visual effects, post-production, and animation, where he served as the Chief Executive Officer.

A year later, he directed Abang Long Fadil, a spin-off from 2011 film, KL Gangster, one of its main star, Zizan Razak reprising his role as Fadil. The film was released in May 2014 to popular success. His third movie, a horror documentary film entitled Villa Nabila was released in January 2015, starring Pekin Ibrahim and Tisha Shamsir, which is based on the 2013 eponymous bungalow incident.

Syafiq subsequently directed his fifth film which began principal photography on 13 November 2014 in Kuala Lumpur and Putrajaya. Released on 8 December 2016, a mystery science fiction Desolasi starring his brother Syamsul as Aiman, a visual artist who deals with never-ending problems starts to wonder the judgment given by God which brings him to stuck in another dimension leading him being fully alone until he starts meeting a mysterious woman named Maya. For this film, he utilized the Anton-Babinski syndrome metaphor as a subject into the storyline and using special effects to blanking the city of Kuala Lumpur. It also stars Jalaluddin Hassan, Pekin Ibrahim, and Bella Dally.

His seventh film, Abang Long Fadil 2 was released on 24 August 2017. With a budget estimated RM 3.2 million, the film earns highest grossed more than RM 18.15 million, behind Munafik directed by his brother, which grossed RM 17.04 million.

On 8 March 2018, his action film KL Special Force was released, starring Rosyam Nor, Fattah Amin and his brother, who played Asyraf, a leader of the Anarchy Gang (Geng Anarkis). The film sets up new record in Malaysian film industry by garnering highest box office grossing more than RM12.1 million and received mixed positive reviews from film critics.

His latest effort, a psychological horror Misteri Dilaila was released on 21 February 2019. Principal photography took place in Fraser's Hill, Pahang; the film was starring Zul Ariffin, Elizabeth Tan, Rosyam Nor, Namron, Sasqia Dahuri and others.

It was announced in September 2019 that he would be directing the third sequel of Polis Evo with Shaheizy Sam and Zizan Razak reprising their respective roles.

== Personal life ==
Syafiq married with his long-time girlfriend, Aisyeah Zainal on 5 April 2014. The couple have three children, namely two daughters – Nuur Jannah (born 2016), Nuur Nusaybah (born 2018) and a son - Muhamad Nu'Aiman (born 2023).

== Filmography ==
=== Film ===
Year	Title	Credited as			Notes
Year	Title	Director	Writer	Producer	Notes
2010	Abangku Gengster	Yes	No	No	Short film
2010	Hantu Takde Kepala	Yes	No	No	Short film
2010	Abangku Gengster II	Yes	No	No	Short film
2010	Lorong	Yes	No	Yes	Short film; also as editor and Director of Photography
2011	Along	Yes	Yes	Yes	Short film
2012	SAM: Saya Amat Mencintaimu	Yes	Yes	No	Directorial debut, also as editor
2014	Abang Long Fadil	Yes	Yes	No	Also as editor
2015	Villa Nabila	Yes	No	Yes	Documentary film
2016	Mat Moto	Yes	No	Yes	Co-directed with Pekin Ibrahim
2016	Desolasi	Yes	Yes	No	Also as editor
2017	Abang Long Fadil 2	Yes	Yes	No	Also as editor
2018	KL Special Force	Yes	Yes	Yes	Also as editor
2019	Misteri Dilaila	Yes	Yes	No	
2019	Rise to Power: KLGU	Yes	No	No	Web film, co-directed with Faisal Ishak
2022	Abang Long Fadil 3	Yes	Yes	No	Also an editor
2023	Polis Evo 3	Yes	No	No	Also as visual effects artist
2023	Budak Flat	No	No	No	Web film, as supervising director
2024	Sheriff: Narko Integriti	Yes	Yes	No	Also as editor with Nazifdin Nasrudin
2025	Soloz: Game of Life	Yes	Yes	No	
2025	Blood Brothers: Bara Naga	Yes	Story	No	Co-directed with Abhilash Chandra

=== Television movie ===
Year	Title	Credited as		Notes
Year	Title	Director	Producer	Notes
2021	Penunggang Agama	Yes	No	script by Nazri M Annuar
2021	Penunggang Agama 2	Yes	No	script by Nazri M Annuar
2024	Telekinesis	Yes	Yes	script by Nazifdin Nasrudin / Also as a editor

=== Television series ===
Year	Title	Credited as		Notes
Year	Title	Director	Producer	Notes
2008–2013	Roda-Roda Kuala Lumpur	Yes	No	Direct only few episode, also actor
2009–2011, 2014–2021	Gerak Khas	Yes	Yes	2009–2011 - direct only few episode, 2014–2021 - as co-producer
2012–2013	Evolusi KL Drift: The Series	Yes	Yes	Also actor as Daniel, co-director with Rizal Ashraff
2015	Cinta Dari Marikh	Yes	Yes	Also actor as Adam
2018	KL Gangster: Underworld	No	Yes	
2020	KL Gangster: Underworld 2	No	Yes	
2021–2022	Gerak Khas Undercover	Yes	Yes	Also as co-director and co-producer
2023	Special Force: Anarchy	Yes	No	
2024–2025	Polis Peronda	Yes	No	Also as co-director

== Videography ==
=== Music video ===
Year	Title	Artist	Director
2012	"Nyawaku"	DJ Dave	Yes
2012	"Sempurnakan Aku"	Anuar Zain	Yes
2012	"Ajari Aku"	Anuar Zain	Yes
2013	"Jalan Bersimpang"	Filsuf and Sleeq	Yes
2014	"Cobaan"	Zizan Razak	Yes
2016	"Kalah Dalam Menang"	Syamsul Yusof and Mawi	Yes
2016	"Bukan Propaganda"	Syamsul Yusof and Mawi	Yes

== Awards and nominations ==
Year	Award	Recipient	Nominated works	Category	Result	Ref.
2013	25th Malaysian Film Festival	Syafiq Yusof	SAM	Best Director	Nominated	
2013	25th Malaysian Film Festival	Syafiq Yusof	SAM	Best Editing	Nominated	
2013	25th Malaysian Film Festival	Syafiq Yusof	SAM	Most Promising Director	Won	
2017	2017 PROFIMA Awards	Syafiq Yusof	Desolasi	Best Director	Won	
2017	29th Malaysian Film Festival	Syafiq Yusof	Abang Long Fadil 2	Box Office Film	Won	
2019	31st Malaysian Film Festival	Syafiq Yusof	Misteri Dilaila	Best Editing	Nominated	
2022	32nd Malaysian Film Festival	Syafiq Yusof	Abang Long Fadil 3	Best Director	Nominated	
2022	32nd Malaysian Film Festival	Syafiq Yusof	Abang Long Fadil 3	Best Screenplay	Nominated	
2022	32nd Malaysian Film Festival	Syafiq Yusof	Abang Long Fadil 3	Best Editing	Nominated	
