= List of Malaysian films of 2017 =

This is a list of Malaysian films produced and released in 2017. Most of these films are produced in the Malay language, but there also a significant number of them that are produced in English, Mandarin, Cantonese and Tamil.

== 2017 ==
=== January – March ===
Opening		Title	Director	Cast	Genre	Notes	Ref.
J A N U A R Y	12	Dorm Melati	Eyra Rahman	Aedy Ashraf, Nadia Aqilah, Aizat Hassan, Ardell Aryana	Horror	MIG Pictures	
J A N U A R Y	19	Aku Bukan Spy	Danial Rifki	Hamish Daud, Siti Saleha, Ray Sahetapy, Keith Foo, Shafira Umm, Nasha Aziz	Action / Romance	Sheunik	
J A N U A R Y	26	Love From Kampung	Silver Yee	Jack Lim, Jeff Chin, Emily Chan, January So	Comedy / Drama	MIG Pictures; Cantonese-language film	
J A N U A R Y	26	New Year Wish	Lee Sai Yew	Sanny Lee, Debbie Loo, Michael Lieu	Drama / Family / Romance	Hooray Movies; Mandarin-language film	
F E B R U A R Y	2	Aku Haus Darah Mu	Aidilfitri Mohd Yunus	Nad Zainal, Deanna Yusoff, Farhanna Qismina, Zoey Rahman	Horror	Tsar Asia	
F E B R U A R Y	2	Money Money Home	Bryan Gao	Lai Meng, Henry Thia, Jovi Theng, Chen Puie Heng	Comedy / Family	Idea Entertainment; Mandarin-language film	
F E B R U A R Y	9	I Am Lee Kah Seng	Benison Yong Keak Jya	Steve Yap, Regine Tan, Marcus Yong	Comedy / Drama	Benison Pictures; Cantonese-language film	
F E B R U A R Y	16	Soulmate Hingga Jannah	Abdul Razak Mohaideen	Taufik Batisah, Erra Fazira, Raja Ilya, Douglas Lim, Reen Rahim	Comedy / Romance	FiTA Studios	
F E B R U A R Y	23	Pak Pong	Fauzi Nawawi	Hairul Azreen, Siti Saleha, Badrul, Fauzi Nawawi, Eizlan Yusof	Drama / Fantasy	9 Country Creativity production	
M A R C H	2	J Revolusi	Mohd Zulkarnain Mohd Azhar	Zul Ariffin, Izara Aishah, Nur Fazura, Farid Kamil, Azad Jasmin, Iedil Putra	Action / Drama	Infinitus Productions-Primeworks Studios co-production	
M A R C H	7	Henry of Malacca: A Malay and Magellan	Pedro Palma	Aryan Farhan, Victor Gonçalves, Miguel Damião, João Vieira Pinto, Anísio Franco	Documentary	Yayasan DMDI	
M A R C H	9	Adiwira Ku	Eric Ong	Sangeeta Krishnasamy, Xavier Fong, Wan Azlyn, Farra Safwan, Ahmad Adnin Zidane, Irdina Tasmin, Balqis Sani, Rizal Fahmi	Drama	Filmmecca Studio	
M A R C H	16	Kanang Anak Langkau: The Iban Warrior	Badaruddin Azmi	Langgi Kanang, Adi Putra, Johan As'ari	Military / Action	Tangan Seni-K3X Production co-production Malay- and Iban-language film	
M A R C H	16	Therapist	Don Hoe & Bryan Gao	Jean Tan, Chai Cheng Sheong, Marcus Chang, Chen Puie Heng, Momoko Fern, Shaun Chen, Feon Lai	Horror / Thriller	Full Billion Entertainment; Mandarin-language film	
M A R C H	16	Cerita-Cerita Didi And Friends	Sinan Ismail	Nur Insyeerah, Muntazar Ghufran, Adam Muqri, Alia Safira	Animation	TGV Pictures	
M A R C H	23	Goodbye Mr. Loser	Adrian Teh Kean Kok	Ian Fang, Mei Sim, Anjoe Koh, Phoebe Huang, Jack Lim, Jack Yap	Comedy	Asia Tropical; Mandarin-language film	
M A R C H	30	Kimchi Untuk Awak	Michael Ang	Aiman Hakim, Emma Maembong, Janna Nick, Sharifah Sakinah, Ungku Haris, Natasha Elyzza, Dira Abu Zahar	Comedy / Romance	Astro Shaw-Dark Wave Pictures co-production	

=== April – June ===
Opening		Title	Director	Cast	Genre	Notes	Ref.
A P R I L	6	Sindiket	Badaruddin Azmi	Sharnaaz Ahmad, Liyana Jasmay, Sharifah Amani, Daphne Iking, Rashidi Ishak, Soo Wincci, Tony Eusoff	Action / Crime	Loyal Studios	
A P R I L	13	Hospital	Azaromi Ghazali	Fatin Afeefa, Shima Anuar, Nina Iskandar, Fizz Fairuz	Horror / Thriller	MIG Pictures	
A P R I L	20	Kamar Seksa	M. Suurya	Sazzy Falak, Noorkhiriah, Ieda Moin, Aiyuni Hashim	Drama	Genius Parade	
M A Y	4	You Mean the World to Me	Saw Teong Hin	Frederick Lee, Neo Swee Lin, John Tan, Chelsia Ng, Chad O'Brien	Drama	Astro Shaw; Penang Hokkien-language	
M A Y	4	Lebuhraya Ke Neraka	Mamat Khalid	Awie, Khir Rahman, Pekin Ibrahim, Miera Leyana, Shah Jaszle	Horror / Drama	Primeworks Studios	
J U N E	8	RIP?	S.T. Bala	Manan Subra, Suloshna Balan, S. S. Shivajee, Venumathi	Drama	Fenomena Seni Produksi; Tamil-language film	
J U N E	25	Minah Moto	Ahmad Idham	Dayana Roza, Ariz Lufias, Cat Farish, Julia Hana, Aliff Yasraf	Action / Comedy	Aifa Motion Pictures	

=== July – September ===
Opening		Title	Director	Cast	Genre	Notes	Ref.
J U L Y	20	Kerja Kahwin	Anwardi Jamil	Janna Nick, Rosnani Jamil, Shaharuddin Thamby, Ziema Din, Syed Ali, Aziz M. Osman, A. R. Badul	Comedy / Romance	Wayang Padu	
J U L Y	20	Puthiya Payanam	Kathiraven Subramaniam	Raven, Lavysha, Yoga, Koghilan Suren	Action / Drama / Sports	SB Production; Tamil-language film	
J U L Y	27	Kau Yang Satu	Osman Ali	Aaron Aziz, Izara Aishah, Soo Wincci, Hisyam Hamid, Zaidi Omar, Wan Hanafi Su	Romance	Astro Shaw-Global Station co-production	
A U G U S T	3	Maama Machan	RMS Sara	Nithya Shree, BenG, RMS Sara.R, P Jegan, Mcva, Linges, Shamini, Kalpana Shree	Comedy	Boss Pictures; Tamil-language film	
A U G U S T	3	Hijabsta Ballet	Syed Zul Tojo	Puteh Maimun Zahrah, Betty Benafe, Aman Graseka, Aida Khalida	Drama	Explosive Magic	
A U G U S T	10	Pencuri Hati Mr. Cinderella	Ahmad Idham	Ahmad Idham, Atikah Suhaimie, Eizlan Yusof, Cat Farish, Faye Kusairi, Hairul Azreen, Haliza Misbun	Romance	Aifa Motion Pictures	
A U G U S T	17	Balun	Bob Singah	Beto Kusyairy, Izara Aishah, Eizlan Yusof, Reen Rahim	Action	Elements Pictures	
A U G U S T	24	Abang Long Fadil 2	Syafiq Yusof	Zizan Razak, Syamsul Yusof, AC Mizal, Tania Hudson, Wak Doyok, Achey Bocey, Shuib Sepahtu, A. Galak, Mas Khan	Action / Comedy	Skop Productions-Astro Shaw co-production Preceded by Abang Long Fadil (2014)	
A U G U S T	25	Vettai Karuppar Ayya	Amigoz Sugu	GK, GpKay, Nanba Vijay, Gayathri	Drama / Horror / Mystery	D'Cinema; Tamil-language film	
A U G U S T	31	Malay Regiment	Jurey Latiff	Yus Waisar, Nad Zainal, Z.Zamri, Ahmad Tarmimi Siregar	Action	World Evolution Brain	
A U G U S T	31	Mendidih Bro	Z. Lokman	Azrel Ismail, Julianna Evans, Marlyn Guinto, Yank Kassim, Adrea Abdullah, Z. Lokman, Amy Mastura	Adventure	Swamatra	
S E P T E M B E R	7	Kau Takdirku	Jason Chong	Ezzaty Abdullah, Bront Palarae, Remy Ishak	Drama / Romance	Primeworks Studios	
S E P T E M B E R	7	Mrs K	Ho Yuhang	Kara Wai, Simon Yam, Wu Bai, Faizal Hussein	Action	Red Films; Mandarin-language film	
S E P T E M B E R	14	Kolestrol vs Cinta	Eyra Rahman	Tiz Zaqyah, Kamal Adli, Ardell Aryana	Romance	MIG Pictures	
S E P T E M B E R	21	Bisik Pada Langit	Kabir Bhatia	Jalil Hamid, Ummi Nazeera, Beto Kusyairy, Fadilah Mansor	Drama	Nusantara Seni Karya	
S E P T E M B E R	21	9.13 The Returning	David Thian Thor Wei	Jean Tan, Steve Yap, Remon Lim, Sherlyn Seo, Kevin Soo	Horror	DAA Productions; Mandarin-language film	
S E P T E M B E R	28	LuQman	Mahadi J. Murat	Wan Hanafi Su, Raja Ilya, Josiah Hogan	Drama	Institut Kesenian dan Kajian Media Malaysia	
S E P T E M B E R	28	The Farm: En Veettu Thottathil	Karthik Shamalan	Jaya Ganason, Mohanaraj, Mahesan Poobalan, Yugendran Maniam, Haridhass	Horror	S Cape Imagination; Tamil-language film	

=== October – December ===
Opening		Title	Director	Cast	Genre	Notes	Ref.
O C T O B E R	5	Aku Bukan Terrorist	Arjin Uppal	Afiq Muiz, Gulshan Grover, Chacha Maembong, Rahul Dev, Farida Jalal, Jalaluddin Hassan, Betty Benafe	Drama	White Merpati Entertainment	
O C T O B E R	5	Vasantha Villas	Roy	Jeeva, Vadivukarasi, Ben'G, Sangetha, Saminathan	Action	AG Film Factory	
O C T O B E R	12	Tombiruo: Penunggu Rimba	Seth Larney	Farid Kamil, Zul Ariffin, Nabila Huda, Faizal Hussein, Hasnul Rahmat	Action / Drama	Astro Shaw-Layar Sunan co-production	
O C T O B E R	12	Shuttle Life	Tan Seng Kiat	Jack Tan, Angel Chan, Sylvia Chang	Family	More Entertainment; Mandarin-language film	
O C T O B E R	19	Haunted Hotel	Ryon Lee	Sushar Manaying, Azman Hassan, Teddy Chin, Alvin Chong, Li Chuan	Horror	Lomo Pictures; Mandarin-language film	
O C T O B E R	26	Asli	David Liew	Gina Wong, Rain Lee, Amit Joyo Bah Chu Hong, Alang Bah Kang	Family	Cinetopia; Mandarin-language film	
O C T O B E R	26	Dubai My Love	Aidilfitri Mohamed Yunos	Erwin Dawson, Hanna Aqeela, Putri Najuwa, Ben Ali	Romance / Family	Tsar Asia	
N O V E M B E R	2	Peransang Rentap	Lina Johor	Vincent Mallang, Diana Johor, Charlmay, Emmanuel Reuben, Ethel Lampai	Romance / Historical	Unique Twins	
N O V E M B E R	9	Jhangri	Kabilan Plondran	Vicran Elanggoven, Agalyah Maniam, Kuben Mahadevan, Daview Puvanan, K. Karnan	Romance	Jhangri Production House; Tamil-language film	
N O V E M B E R	9	Headlines	James Wong Chee Keong	Wang Lei, Shaun Chen, Sean Lee, Seck Fook Yee	Horror	Just Work Entertainment; Mandarin-language film	
N O V E M B E R	16	The Kid From The Big Apple 2: Before We Forget	Jess Teong	Tommy Tam, Tan Qin Lin, Debbie Goh, Shaun Tam	Family	Three Pictures; Mandarin-language film	
N O V E M B E R	23	Motor Terbang: Rempit Sampai Langit	Silver Yee	Ajak Shiro, Nabila Huda, Tauke Jambu, Reen Rahim, Jay Iswazir, Cristina Suzanne	Action / Comedy	Suhan Movies & Trading	
N O V E M B E R	23	Thottam: The Garden	Arangkannal Rajoo	KS Maniam, Singai Jegan, Aghilvarman, Thana, Ruban, Vivian Chong	Drama	Blueye Productions; Tamil-language film	
N O V E M B E R	30	Aasaan	S. D. Puvanendran	S. Haridhass, Shashi Tharan, Seelan Manoheran, Saresh D'seven	Action	Nova Rimbun; Tamil-language film	
N O V E M B E R	30	Pinjamkan Hatiku	Osman Ali	Ayda Jebat, Shaheizy Sam, Farid Kamil, Lia Natalia, Normah Damanhuri	Romance	Nuansa	
D E C E M B E R	7	Papa, Come Home	Nick Wong & Chong Shee Lin	Jack Lim, Jayden Sow, Jieying Tha, Kenji Sawahii	Family	The Film Engine; Mandarin-language film	
D E C E M B E R	7	Jibam	Che Mie	Mohd. Ariff Abdullah, Bohari Ibrahim, Syafie Naswip, Kazar Saisi	Drama	Spektra Selasih	
D E C E M B E R	21	Brotherhood	Silver Yee	Eric Lin, Bernard Hiew, Hanz Koay, Sky Kang, January So, Sherlyn Seo	Action	Malayflix Movies; Mandarin-language film	
D E C E M B E R	21	KL Wangan: Bikin Gempak	Pekin Ibrahim	Faizal Hussein, Pekin Ibrahim, Kazuto Soon, Emily Lim	Action	Centro Pictures	
