= Yusof Haslam =

Malaysian actor and filmmaker

Yang Berbahagia Datuk Yusof Haslam PJN AMN
- يوسف حسلام
- Born: Md. Yusof bin Md. Haslam Khan; 24 April 1954 (age 72); Kuala Lumpur, Federation of Malaya (present-day Malaysia)
- Other name: DYH
- Education: SMK Aminuddin Baki, Kuala Lumpur
- Occupations: Actor, film director, screenwriter, producer
- Years active: 1972–present
- Spouses: Raja Noor Saadah Sahehuddin (m. 1978; div. 1980) Datin Fatimah Ismail (m. 1982)
- Children: 4, including Syamsul and Syafiq
- Relatives: Haji Mohd Nor Haslam (brother)

Yang Berbahagia ACP (K) Datuk Md. Yusof bin Md. Haslam Khan (born 24 April 1954) is a Malaysian actor, film director and producer. He is best known for his longest-running police procedural drama series Gerak Khas, a TV series that he created, directed and produced, that then led to the production of three feature films. The immense popularity of his films had led him to be nicknamed the "Six Million Dollar Man".

His legacy in entertainment showbiz is now carried by his two sons, Syamsul and Syafiq. Yusof also has his own television and film production company, Skop Productions, where he served as the managing director.

== Early life and film career ==
Yusof was born on 24 April 1954 in Jalan Pahang, Kuala Lumpur to housewife Bahyah Talib and lorry driver Md. Haslam Khan. He is a fourth child from among seven siblings who together lived in a house in the squatter settlement. He received his education at the SMK Aminuddin Baki in Kuala Lumpur.

He became enamoured with movies through his experiences seeing Hollywood westerns and Bollywood films—with the latter, he considered one of the stars Shashi Kapoor as his acting idol. Yusof thus decided that he would become an actor, much to objections by his father who believed that the entertainment scene held no future prospects.

Yusof took up profession as a bus conductor, but he also secretly attended acting auditions. He began his involvement in acting by playing an extra character in Laksamana Do Re Mi in 1972, as match spectators. It would only be until in 1975 that he would take a leading main role through the film Permintaan Terakhir.

== Directing career ==
He began directing films in 1991 with Bayangan Maut, a mystery action thriller film starring rock singer Ella. This was later followed by Pemburu Bayang in 1993, Sembilu in 1994, best-selling blockbuster film, Maria Mariana in 1996 plus its sequel two years after among others.

Apart from film and television, he is also a managing director of his production company, Skop Productions which he had established since 1985. The company has four subsidiaries – Haslam Trading (restaurant), Haslam Properties (real estate and properties), Skop Publishing (print publications) and ME Communications (post-production facilities).

He was awarded the Ahli Mangku Negara in 1993 and the Panglima Jasa Negara in 2001, which carries the title of Dato', for his contributions to Malaysian cinema.

== Personal life ==
Yusof married twice. His first marriage was with Raja Noor Saadah Salehuddin in 1978 and divorced in 1980, they have no children. He later married Fatimah Ismail in 1982. They have four children namely Faizal, Syamsul, Shamin and Syafiq. Syamsul and Syafiq themselves are also actors and film directors.

== Filmography ==
Key
Denotes film/dramas that have not yet been released

=== Feature films ===
Year	Title	Credited as				Role	Notes
Year	Title	Actor	Director	Writer	Producer	Role	Notes
1972	Laksamana Do Re Mi	Yes	No	No	No	Match spectators	First appearance, extra character
1975	Permintaan Terakhir	Yes	No	No	No	Idham	
1975	Jiwa Remaja	Yes	No	No	No	Yusof	
1976	Loceng Maut	Yes	No	No	No	Tok Penghulu	
1976	Sayang Anakku Sayang	Yes	No	No	No		
1976	Cinta dan Lagu	Yes	No	No	No	Malek	
1979	Tiada Esok Bagimu	Yes	No	No	No	Amir	
1980	Detik 12 Malam	Yes	No	No	No	Remie	
1981	Ribut Barat	Yes	No	No	No	Adnan	
1981	Jejak Bertapak	Yes	No	No	No		
1981	Bukit Kepong	Yes	No	No	No	MM Jaafar Hassan	
1982	Sikit Punya Gila	Yes	No	No	No	Abang Yusof	
1982	Senja Merah	Yes	No	No	No	Anuar	
1982	Penentuan	Yes	No	No	No	Hafsham	
1983	Mekanik	Yes	No	No	No	The Head of the Mafia	
1984	Di Ambang Kasih	Yes	No	No	No	Rusdi	
1984	Melati Putih	Yes	No	No	No	Hisyam	
1984	Jauh Di Sudut Hati	Yes	No	No	No		
1987	Rahsia	Yes	No	No	No	Dato' Karim	
1987	Wira Angkasa	Yes	No	No	No	Yusof	
1990	Driving School	Yes	No	No	No	Dato' Zahlol	
1991	Juara	Yes	No	No	No	Joe Martino	
1991	Bayangan Maut	Yes	Yes	Yes	Yes	ASP Razlan	
1991	Harry Boy	Yes	No	No	No		
1991	Shakila	Yes	No	No	No	Zahari	
1993	Pemburu Bayang	Yes	Yes	Yes	Yes	Ramon	
1993	Balada	Yes	No	No	No	Sunny	
1994	Sembilu	No	Yes	Yes	Yes	—	
1995	Sembilu II	No	Yes	Yes	Yes	—	
1996	Maria Mariana	No	Yes	Yes	Yes	—	
1996	Tragedi Oktober	No	No	Yes	Yes	—	
1997	Gemilang	No	Yes	Story	Yes	—	
1998	Maria Mariana II	No	Yes	Yes	Yes	—	
1999	Bara	No	Yes	Yes	Yes	—	
2000	Pasrah	No	Yes	Yes	Yes	—	
2001	Gerak Khas The Movie	Yes	Yes	Yes	Yes	DSP Helmi	
2002	Gerak Khas The Movie II	Yes	Yes	Yes	Yes	SUPT Helmi	
2002	Mr. Cinderella	No	No	No	Yes	—	
2003	Janji Diana	No	Yes	Yes	Yes	—	
2003	Mr. Cinderella 2	No	No	No	Yes	—	
2003	Gila-Gila Pengantin	No	No	No	Yes	—	
2003	MX3	No	No	No	Yes	—	
2004	Gila-Gila Pengantin Remaja	No	No	No	Yes	—	
2005	GK3 The Movie	Yes	Yes	Yes	Yes	SUPT Helmi	
2005	Gila-Gila Pengantin Popular	Yes	No	No	Yes	Audition Jury	
2005	Sembilu 2005	No	Yes	Yes	Yes	—	
2005	Pontianak Menjerit	No	No	No	Yes	—	
2008	Evolusi KL Drift	No	No	No	Yes	—	
2009	Bohsia: Jangan Pilih Jalan Hitam	No	No	No	Yes	—	
2010	Evolusi KL Drift 2	No	No	No	Yes	—	
2011	Khurafat: Perjanjian Syaitan	No	No	No	Yes	—	
2011	KL Gangster	No	No	No	Yes	—	
2011	Aku Bukan Tomboy	No	No	Story	Yes	—	
2012	Jalan Kembali: Bohsia 2	No	No	No	Yes	—	
2012	SAM: Saya Amat Mencintaimu	No	No	No	Yes	—	
2013	Gangster Celop	No	No	No	Yes	—	
2013	KL Gangster 2	No	No	No	Yes	—	
2014	Abang Long Fadil	No	No	No	Yes	—	
2016	Mat Moto	No	No	No	Yes	—	
2016	Munafik	No	No	No	Yes	—	
2016	Desolasi	No	No	No	Yes	—	
2017	Abang Long Fadil 2	Yes	No	No	Yes	Himself	
2017	KL Wangan	Yes	No	No	No	Chief of Police	
2018	KL Special Force	No	No	No	Yes	—	
2018	Munafik 2	No	No	No	Yes	—	
2018	Tangisan Akinabalu	Yes	No	No	No	DSP Ranau	
2018	Operasi X	Yes	No	No	No	Dato' Mokhtar	
2019	Misteri Dilaila	No	No	No	Yes	—	
2019	Rise to Power: KLGU	No	No	No	Yes	—	Also as executive producer
2019	Banglo No 99	Yes	No	No	No	Tengku Izzuddin Shah	
2021	Penunggang Agama	No	No	No	Yes	—	
2021	Mat Bond Malaya	Yes	No	No	No	Ejen 2	
2021	Penunggang Agama 2	No	No	No	Yes	—	
2021	Siapa Tutup Lampu?	Yes	No	No	No	Dr. Ali	
2021	Tarantula X	Yes	No	No	No	Dr. Yusof Enstein	
2022	Abang Long Fadil 3	Yes	No	No	Yes	Film director	
2023	Harun Malam	No	No	No	Yes	—	As executive producer
2023	Polis Evo 3	No	No	No	Yes	—	As executive producer
2023	Budak Flat	No	No	No	Yes	—	As executive producer
2024	Sheriff: Narko Integriti	No	No	Story	Yes	—	
2024	Housekeeping	No	No	No	Yes	—	As executive producer
2024	Telekinesis	No	No	No	Yes	—	
2024	Don Dukun	Yes	No	No	No	Pak Don Samad	
2025	Blood Brothers	No	No	No	Yes	—	
2026	Libang Libu	Yes	No	No	No	Imam	
2026	5 Bomoh	Yes	No	No	Yes		As executive producer

=== Television series ===
Year	Title	Credited as				Role	TV channel	Notes
Year	Title	Actor	Director	Creator	Producer	Role	TV channel	Notes
1983–1984	PJ Holdings	Yes	No	No	No	Jamil	TV1	
1985/86	Remang-Remang Kotaraya (S1- S2)	Yes	Yes	Yes	Yes	ASP Alif	TV1	
1987/88	Harimau Rimba (S1-S2)	Yes	Yes	Yes	Yes	Leftenan Jantan	TV1	
1988	Disebalik Ombak	Yes	Yes	Yes	Yes	Inspector	TV1	
1989/90/91	Debu-Debu Kotaraya (S1-S3)	Yes	Yes	Yes	Yes	ASP Jefri	TV1	
1991	Metro Skuad	Yes	Yes	Yes	Yes	ACP Osman Salleh	TV1	
1992	Detik Metropolitan	Yes	Yes	Yes	Yes	ASP Chief Unit Operation	TV1	
1993	Roda Roda Kotaraya (Season 1)	Yes	Yes	Yes	Yes	ASP Razlan	TV1	
1994	Roda Roda Kotaraya (Season 2)	Yes	Yes	Yes	Yes	DSP Razlan	TV1	
1995	Skuad Khas	Yes	Yes	Yes	Yes	DSP	TV1	
1998–1999, 2008–2013	Roda-Roda Kuala Lumpur	No	No	Yes	Yes	—	TV1, TV2	
1999–2011, 2014–2021	Gerak Khas	Yes	Yes	Yes	Yes	DCP Datuk Helmi	TV1, TV2, TV3	Co-director
2000	Maria Mariana The Series	No	Yes	Yes	Yes	—	TV3	
2004–2005	Sembilu	No	Yes	Yes	Yes	—	TV2	
2005	Meniti Bara	No	Yes	Yes	Yes	—	TV2	
2005–2007	Sembilu Kasih	No	Yes	Yes	Yes	—	TV3	
2006	Janji Diana	No	Yes	Yes	Yes	—	TV2	
2007	Air Mata Maria	No	Yes	No	Yes	—	TV3	
2008	Farah Syakira	No	Yes	No	Yes	—	TV2	
2009–2011	Si Capik	No	Yes	Yes	Yes	—	TV2	
2011	Serapah Darah Bulan Madu	No	No	No	Yes	—	Astro Prima	
2011	Khurafat The Series	No	No	No	Yes	—	Astro Ria	
2012–2013	Metro Skuad	No	No	Yes	Yes	—	TV2	
2012–2013	Evolusi KL Drift: The Series	No	No	No	Yes	—	TV2	
2013	Sopi Sekuriti	No	Yes	No	Yes	—	Astro Warna	
2014	Jalan Kembali	No	Yes	No	Yes	—	TV2	Adaptation from the back Jalan Kembali: Bohsia 2. First acting Hafiz Hamidun
2014	Siri Bercapkap Dengan Jin (Season 1)	No	Yes	No	Yes	—	Astro Mustika HD	
2014	Tanah Kubur (Season 9)	Yes	No	No	No	Yusof	Astro Oasis	Episode: "Qasaf"
2015	Tanah Kubur (Season 11)	Yes	No	No	No	Johan	Astro Oasis	Episode: "Aku Ceraikan Kamu, Kamu, Kamu, Kamu"
2015	Siri Bercakap Dengan Jin (Season 2)	No	Yes	No	Yes	—	Astro Prima	
2015–2016	Cinta Dari Marikh	No	No	No	Yes	—	TV2	
2017	Dia Bidadariku	No	No	No	Yes	—	Astro Ria	
2017	My Darling, Inspektor Daniel	No	No	No	Yes	—	Astro Ria	
2018	Sejadah Untuk Dia	No	No	No	Yes	—	Astro Oasis	
2018	KL Gangster: Underworld	No	No	No	Yes	—	Iflix	
2018	Mata Ketiga	No	No	No	Yes	—	Tonton	
2020–2021	KL Gangster: Underworld 2	No	No	No	Yes	—	Iflix, WeTV	
2021	Single Terlalu Lama	Yes	No	No	No	Datuk	TV3	
2021	Diva Popular	Yes	No	No	No		Awesome TV	
2021–2022	Gerak Khas Undercover	No	No	No	Yes	—	TV3	
2022	Kuasa	No	No	No	Yes	—	Astro Citra	
2023	Special Force: Anarchy	No	No	No	Yes	—	Disney+ Hotstar	As executive producer
2023	Persepsi	No	No	No	Yes	—	Astro Ria	As executive producer
2024–2025	Polis Peronda	No	Yes	Yes	Yes	—	TV3	

=== Telemovie ===
Year	Title	Credited as			Role	TV channel
Year	Title	Actor	Director	Producer	Role	TV channel
1976	Madu Beracun	Yes	No	No	Shamsul	TV1
1986	Rumah Maut	Yes	No	No		TV1
1998	Tirai Kasih	No	No	Yes	—	Astro Ria
2000	Sebalik Bayangan	Yes	No	No		TV3
2012	Asmara Beijing	No	Yes	Yes	—	Astro Citra

=== Television ===
Year	Program	Role	TV channel
2013	Maharaja Lawak Mega 2013	Himself (permanent judge)	Astro Mustika HD
2014	1Malaysia Ikon	Himself	RTM
2014	Hlive: Apa Khabar Malaysia	Himself (guest)	Astro Ria
2017	Konsert Gegar Vaganza (Season 4)	Himself (invitation jury)	Astro Ria
2022	Master in the House Malaysia	Himself (master)	TV3

== Honours ==
=== Honours of Malaysia ===
- Malaysia
  - Member of the Order of the Defender of the Realm (AMN) (1993)
  - Commander of the Order of Meritorious Service (PJN) – Datuk (2001)
- Royal Malaysia Police
  - Honorary Assistant Commissioner of Police awarded by the Royal Malaysia Police (2012)

=== Honorary degrees ===
- Malaysia
  - Honorary Degree of Doctor of Arts (Films) at the Open University Malaysia (2018)
