= Misteri Dilaila =

2019 film by Syafiq Yusof

The Mystery Of Delaila
- Directed by: Syafiq Yusof
- Screenplay by: Syafiq Yusof
- Produced by: Yusof Haslam
- Starring: Zul Ariffin; Elizabeth Tan; Namron; Rosyam Nor; Sasqia Dahuri
- Cinematography: Indra Che Muda
- Edited by: Syafiq Yusof
- Music by: Lo Shi Seng; Ken Hor
- Production companies: Skop Productions; Astro Shaw
- Release dates: 21 February 2019 (Malaysia, Singapore, Brunei); 15 March 2019 (Indonesia)
- Running time: 81 minutes (version 1); 82 minutes (version 2)
- Country: Malaysia
- Languages: Malay; English
- Budget: MYR 2.2 million
- Box office: MYR 9.4 million

Misteri Dilaila (English: The Mystery of Dilaila) is a 2019 Malaysian Malay-language psychological horror thriller film directed by Syafiq Yusof starring Zul Ariffin, Elizabeth Tan, Namron, Rosyam Nor and Sasqia Dahuri. The film follows a couple as the wife (Elizabeth Tan) goes missing after the husband (Zul Ariffin) experiences strange events during their first night staying at the family bungalow in Fraser's Hill. Things get complicated when another woman (Sasqia Dahuri) appears and claims to be the wife.

The film was released in two versions on 21 February 2019 in Malaysia, Singapore and Brunei, making it to be the first Malaysian film to have two versions that has different alternate endings. The movie is an adaptation of the 1986 TV movie Vanishing Act which itself was based on the 1958 movie Chase A Crooked Shadow.

Viewers claimed that nearly 80 per cent of Misteri Dilaila’s storyline bore similarities to the David Green-directed film which starred Mike Farrel and Margot Kidder.

== Plot ==
The story follows a young couple named Jefri (Zul Ariffin) and Dilaila (Elizabeth Tan) who are on vacation at a bungalow house in Fraser's Hill, Pahang. During their first night in the house, Jefri is disturbed by strange events, only to find out the next day that his wife has gone missing. Jefri meets Inspector Azman (Rosyam Nor) and tells that his wife comes from a very wealthy family and the bungalow is his in-law's wedding gift to him. Jefri also explains that he is worried about his wife's disappearance since she is not a good driver, implying that she might have met with an accident. Later that night, Jefri is visited by a local Imam Aziz (Namron) who claims that Dilaila was staying with him and he has now convinced her to return to her husband. When Jefri sees Dilaila, he reveals that she is not his wife; but the girl knows details of their lives and Jefri is discredited by the evidences. Is a stranger impersonating Dilaila or is Jefri delusional?

== Cast ==
- Zul Ariffin as Jefri
- Elizabeth Tan as Dilaila
- Namron as Imam Aziz
- Rosyam Nor as Inspector Azman
- Sasqia Dahuri as Dilaila II / Farah
- Mas Khan as Farid
- Iz Sulaini as Photographer
- Kenji Sawahi as Banker / Wong
- Nafiez Zaidi as Corporal Kamal

== Production ==
The film cost about RM 2.2 million. Filming started on 26 March 2018 and ended on 1 May 2018 in a total of 36 days, with shooting taking place on location in Fraser's Hill, Pahang and Forest Research Institute Malaysia (FRIM) in Kepong, Kuala Lumpur.

== Release ==
Misteri Dilaila was released on February 21, 2019 in Malaysia, Singapore and Brunei.

== Plagiarism accusation ==
The film was accused of plagiarism not long after it was screened, and fans has expressed disappointment. 80 percent of the plot is said to have similarities with the 1986 American TV film Vanishing Act that originally aired on CBS, directed by David Green and starring Mike Farrell, Margot Kidder and Fred Gwynne. The TV film itself is a loose remake of two Indian films, Sesh Anka and Puthiya Paravai, which are loosely inspired by the British classic Chase a Crooked Shadow. According to Syafiq Yusof in an interview, he stated that he took the inspiration from two South Korean films: Forgotten (2017) and Challenging.
