= Gila Gusti =

2022 Malaysian action film

- Poster
- Directed by: Silver Chung
- Starring: Syafie Naswip; Elizabeth Tan; Ayez Shaukat; Aisar Khaledd; Pekin Ibrahim; Jalaluddin Hassan; Gotham; Nia Atasha; Nor 'Phoenix' Diana
- Production companies: APAC Wrestling, Lomo Pictures
- Release dates: 17 March 2022 (Malaysia, Brunei, Singapore)
- Country: Malaysia
- Language: Malay

Gila Gusti is a 2022 Malaysian Malay-language action comedy film. It tells the story of two wrestling fans who help a local professional wrestler to find his lost spirit in order to win back and reclaim the wrestling championship after losing the game.

It is the first film about pro wrestling industry in Malaysia. It is released in cinemas on 17 March 2022 in Malaysia, Brunei and Singapore.

== Synopsis ==
Two friends, Mamat and Zul, are die-hard wrestling fans and idolize a successful professional wrestler named Naga. One day, when Naga is defeated in his match and dethroned as a wrestling champion by a stronger rival, the company no longer sees Naga as an asset, and decided to make him lose. Losing his will to continue wrestling, Mamat and Zul were determined to help Naga find his lost spirit in order to win back the Asia Pacific wrestling championship. How will their story go?

== Cast ==
- Syafie Naswip as Mamat
- Elizabeth Tan as Julia
- Ayez Shaukat as Naga
- Aisar Khaledd as Zul
- Pekin Ibrahim as Jiggy
- Jalaluddin Hassan as Tiger Rajah
- Gotham
- Nia Atasha
- Nor 'Phoenix' Diana

== Release ==
The film showcases pro-wrestling industry in Malaysia and features real scenes performed by professional wrestlers. The lead actor Ayez Shaukat is a well-known local professional wrestler who was the first professional wrestler from Malaysia. He founded Malaysia Pro Wrestling (MyPW) and APAC Wrestling in Malaysia.

It also features pro-wrestlers Nor 'Phoenix' Diana, who is the first ever hijab-wearing pro wrestler, The Wonderboy, Gautham Kanakaraj (Gotham), and Poppy Ang.
