= Shuib Sepahtu =

Malaysian comedian, host, singer, radio presenter and entrepreneur

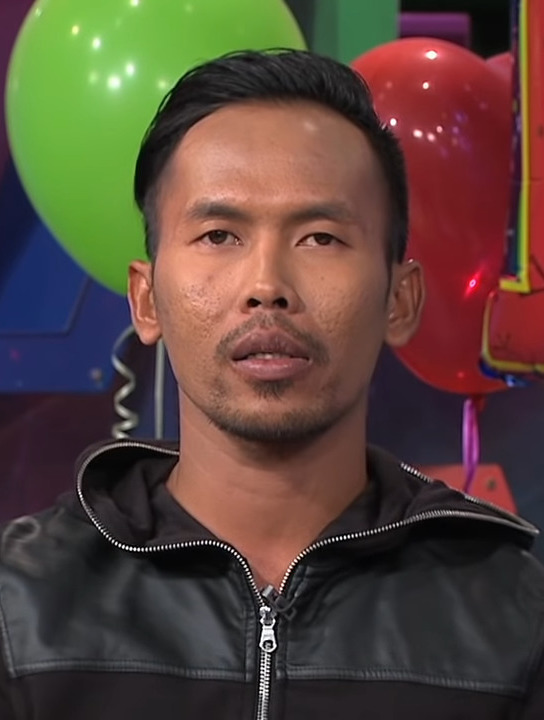
- Shuib in an interview on the show MeleTOP on Astro Ria on 30 September 2014
- Born: Shahmira bin Muhammad; 12 September 1984 (age 42); Sultanah Aminah Hospital, Johor Bahru Johor, Malaysia
- Occupations: Comedian; Actor; TV host; Singer; Radio presenter; Entrepreneur
- Years active: 2009–present
- Employers: AMP Radio Networks (2009-10); Astro Audio (2015-17); Ripple (2019-21); Star Media Radio Group (2022-23)
- Spouse: Siti Sarah (m. 2011; died 2021) Watie Hanifiah (m. 2023)
- Children: 5
- Parent(s): Salamiah Jalani (mother); Muhammad Arshad (father)

Comedy career
- Medium: Television, film, radio
- Genres: Comedy, satire, sketch
- Subjects: Popular culture, current events
- Members: Sepahtu (2009–2011), (2024-present), Sepahtu (2011–2020)

Shahmira Muhammad (born 12 September 1984), known professionally as Shuib Sepahtu, is a Malaysian comedian, actor, host, singer, radio presenter and entrepreneur. He is a member of the group Sepahtu who has become the champion of the reality show Raja Lawak season 3 in 2009 and also Maharaja Lawak in 2011.

== Early life ==
Shuib was born on 12 September 1984 in Johor Bahru, Johor and raised in Kuala Kurau, Perak. He is the only child of Muhammad Arshad and Salamiah Jalani. After completing Form 5 and obtaining his Sijil Pelajaran Malaysia (SPM), Shuib worked in a manufacturing company that produced electronic products, tissues and wood and earned an income of RM1,200 per month.

== Career ==
Shuib began his comedy career as one of the participants in the third season of Raja Lawak with his former group, Sepah which also included Jep and Mamat, where they were crowned champions. However, Sepah was disbanded, Shuib and Jep withdrew from Sepah. Shuib and Jep then formed a new group called Sepahtu.

Shuib's radio career began in 2015 when he, along with Jep and Rahim R2, became a radio presenter on Sinar through the Sepahtu Sinar segment. However, he resigned from Sinar after only 2 years of service.

Apart from his entertainment career, Shuib is involved in the field of business when he, his wife, Siti Sarah and their partners established a honey-based milk tea chain, Bubblebee which began operations in 2019, where he and his wife serve as board members.

He is also talented in music, performing a duet with his wife, through the song "Semakin Benci Semakin Cinta" by Ajai, which was released in June 2021.

He is currently in indefinite retirement from the entertainment world following the death of his wife.

== Personal life ==
He married singer Siti Sarah on 26 February 2011. The couple had four children. In 2017, the couple celebrated their 6th wedding anniversary. Siti died on 9 August 2021 from a COVID-19 infection at HUKM.

Shuib is color blind.

On 23 June 2023, Shuib married Watie Hanifiah. The couple was married by the bride's brother, Qadhaffi Hanifiah, at Putra Glass House, Putra Heights and witnessed by the Assistant Registrar of Marriages of the Hidayatul Muttaqin Mosque, Kampung Bukit Lanchong, Mr. Zubairi Ghazal.

== Discography ==
=== Single ===
Year	Song title	Collaboration	Note
2012	"Cinta Itu Nyawa"	Siti Sarah	
2017	"Senorita"	Syamsul Yusof & Dato' AC Mizal	OST movie Abang Long Fadil 2
2019	"Honey Juana"		
2020	"Teh Terakhirku"	Mark Adam & Zynakal	
2021	"Semakin Benci Semakin Cinta"	Siti Sarah	
2021	"Sampai Tua"		
2023	"Ilusi Fatamorgana"	Ajak Shiro & Suraya Borhan	OST Segment Morning Morning Suria
2023	"Lenalah"		
2025	"Poyorono"	Mamat Sepah & Ahmad Ahmad	

== Filmography ==
=== Movies ===
Year	Title	Character	Note
2012	Man Sewel Datang KL	Man	The first movie
2012	Mael Lambong	Agent	
2012	Sepah The Movie	Shuib	
2013	Oh Nak Kau (O.M.K)	Mun	
2014	Amir dan Loqman Pergi Ke Laut	Amir	
2016	Usin UFO	Usin	
2016	Rock Bro!	Ms. Not	
2017	Abang Long Fadil 2	Inspector Shuib	
2020	Tyickoouns	Dagu	Special appearance
2022	Abang Long Fadil 3	Inspector Shuib	

=== Drama ===
Year	Title	Character	TV Channel	Notes
2009	Tok Ketua	Shuib Shahmira	Astro Warna	Sitcom, first drama
2010	Bujang Sepah Lalalitampom	Shuib	Astro Prima	
2010	Biar Betul Bendul	Shuib (Si Bisu)	Astro Warna	
2012	Sepahtu: Angan Tak Sudah	Shuib	Astro Warna	
2013	Jep & Judin	Judin	Astro Warna	
2015	Mail & Sudin Sambut Ramadan	Sudin	Astro Oasis	
2019	Sepahtu Reunion Raya Gear 5	Dato' Shuib	Astro Ria	

=== Telefilm ===
Year	Title	Character	TV Channel	Notes
2009	Bujang Sepah Silalitampom	Shuib	Astro Prima	First telefilm
2009	Lemang Si Bujang Sepah	Shuib	Astro Prima	
2010	Ibu Mee Segera		Astro Ria	
2010	Burger Layan Diri	Abdol	Astro Prima	
2012	Bila Shuib Speaking London	Shuib	Astro Warna	
2012	Siapa Dapat Lisa	Shuib	Astro Prima	
2013	Bini Aku Hantu Langsuir	Shuib	TV9	
2014	Muaddib Super	Amin	Astro Ria	
2014	Sepahtu Kepok Bonda	Shuib	Astro Warna	
2015	Ayah Den Lopeh	Mustaqim	Astro Ria	
2015	Awaklah Imam Saya	Mail	Astro Ria	
2016	Bujang Sepahtu Kepok Bonda	Shuib	Astro Mustika HD	
2016	Sepahtu Kisah Tuladan	Shuib	Astro Ria	
2016	Sepahtu Mercun Raya	Shuib	Astro Ria	
2016	Sepahtu Cinta Plastik	Shuib	Astro Ria	
2018	Matilahnak	Hantu Raya	Astro Citra	
2023	Baby-Sita	Cameo	Astro Warna	

=== Television ===
Year	Title	Role	TV Channel	Notes
2009	Gelak Khas	Various Characters	Astro Warna	
2012–2013	Betul Ke Bohong?	Team Captain	Astro Warna	with Jep Sepahtu
2013	Romantika	Himself	Astro Ria	with his wife Siti Sarah
2015	Sepahtu Reunion	Various Characters	Astro Warna	
2016–2020	Sepahtu Reunion Live	Various Characters	Astro Warna	
2017	Meja Bulat Sepahtu	Host	Astro Prima	with Jep & Rahim
2017	Konti Karat	Host	Astro Prima	
2018	Jenaka Kampung Kalut (Season 4)	Ismail	TV3	Episode: "You're Still In My Dreams"
2018	Teka Tekan	Host	Hypp Sensasi	with Shamsul Ghau Ghau, Acong Sweetchild & Anas Ridzuan
2021	Warung Sepahtu	Sarip	Astro Warna	
2021	Sepahtu Reunion Live	Cameo	Astro Warna	Episode: "Finding the Lost Shoes"
2022	Mencari Sepahtu Yang Hilang	Guest Judge	Astro Warna	
2022	Diari Daddy	Himself	TV3	
2022	Semakin Cinta, Shuib	Himself	Astro Ria	
2022	Opocot Next Level	Host	Astro Warna	co-host with Atu Zero
2022–2023	The Masked Singer Malaysia (season 3)	Jury	Astro Warna	
2023	Ubi Superstar Live	Various Characters	Astro Warna	
2023	Dapur Tempur Selebriti	Himself	TV9	with his wife Watie

=== Participants ===
Year	Title	Group
2009	Raja Lawak Astro 3	Sepah
2011	Maharaja Lawak	Sepah
2013	Redah Kasi Pecah Extravaganza	Himself
2013	Super Spontan 2013	Ketam Konfius
2013	Maharaja Lawak Mega 2013	Sepahtu
2014	Super Spontan 2014	Biawak Lazer
2014	Maharaja Lawak Mega 2014	Sepahtu
2015	Juara Parodi	Slumber Blur
2017	Temasya Sukan Ke Laut	Himself
2017	Super Spontan Superstar 2017	King Musang

=== Siniar ===
Year	Title	Role	Channel	Notes	Episode
2024–present	Dols Podcast	Himself	YouTube	with Fizie Roslan & Mamat Sepah	Ep 1-current

== Radiography ==
=== Radio ===
Year	Title	Station
2009-2010	Sepah Malam Era	Era
30 November 2015 - 29 November 2017	Sepahtu Sinar	Sinar
18 February 2019 - 22 January 2021	Geng Pagi Hot	Hot FM
29 August 2022 - 4 December 2023	Morning Morning Suria	Suria

== Achievements ==
Year	Title	Results
2009	Raja Lawak (season 3)	Champion
2011	Maharaja Lawak	Champion
2013	Super Spontan 2013	10th
2013	Redah Kasi Pecah Extravaganza	Champion
2013	Maharaja Lawak Mega 2013	Champion
2014	Super Spontan 2014	3rd
2014	Maharaja Lawak Mega 2014	Runner-up
2015	Champion of Parody	4th
2017	Super Spontaneous Superstar 2017	11th
