= Desolasi =

2016 film by Syafiq Yusof

- Directed by: Syafiq Yusof
- Written by: Syafiq Yusof
- Produced by: Yusof Haslam
- Starring: Syamsul Yusof; Bella Dally; Pekin Ibrahim; Jalaluddin Hassan; Aida Khalida
- Cinematography: Azami Alias
- Edited by: Syafiq Yusof
- Music by: Savy Ho
- Production company: Skop Productions
- Release date: 8 December 2016
- Running time: 112 minutes
- Country: Malaysia
- Languages: Malay; English
- Budget: MYR 4.5 million
- Box office: MYR 2.5 million

Desolasi (English: Desolation) is a 2016 Malaysian Malay-language science fiction psychological thriller film directed by Syafiq Yusof. The film stars Syamsul Yusof, Bella Dally, Pekin Ibrahim and Jalaluddin Hassan. The film revolves around Aiman, a visual artist who deals with never-ending problems. Aiman starts to question the judgment given by God that brings him to become stuck in another dimension, resulting in his becoming entirely isolated until he meets a mysterious woman named Maya. The movie was released on December 8, 2016 by Skop Productions.

== Plot ==
Aiman (Syamsul Yusof) is a street painter who suffers from Anton-Babinski disease from birth. His life became uncertain after being overwhelmed by various problems in life until he almost gave up in life. As we can see at the beginning of the story, Aiman wakes up from sleep and walks in one place after another and then stands in front of the National Palace. He then drove a Lamborghini car and headed to a clothing store and put on a coat. Aiman then drove a Ferrari and continued to stop in the middle of the road while smoking a cigar. 26 years ago, Aiman was born and his father, Hassan (Jalaluddin Hassan) was informed by a doctor that Aiman could only live for two or three years due to complications in the sensory organs and to having a behavioral disorder.

Aiman, who was in an unmanageable condition, went to the old school and reminisced about his school days. Aiman, who was 9 years old at the time in third grade, was called by his teacher and showed him a picture of a tree he had drawn, but colored it blue, not green. Aiman asked his teacher why the tree is green? Then he was punished by his teacher. Aiman, who was less sociable with his peers, was alone while looking at a tree. His mistress explained how the tree was green. Aiman had just finished studying and asked his father why God does not want people to live happily and why there are poor people. Hassan lost his temper and beat Aiman.

In an empty building, Aiman paints a wall with a brush and questions everything for which there is no answer. Objects around it (including tires and paint) begin to float. Aiman gives medicine to his mother (Aida Khalida) who is seriously ill, then scolds his father for spilling a cup of coffee on his canvas painting. Aiman, who works in a painting gallery, was called by his boss (Razif Salimin) and informed him that the painting gallery where he worked would be closed and some employees including him had to be laid off immediately. After the painting gallery closed, Aiman continued his career as a painter, when he started to paint, Dr. Yap (Jacky Kam) comes to observe him and takes a picture of him. A few minutes later, it started to rain. Aiman continued his work as usual after the rain subsided, but was approached by Kuala Lumpur City Hall (DBKL) officials and tried to obstruct the authorities, eventually his artwork was confiscated.

Aiman returned home on a motorcycle, but had an accident. He then worked at an insurance company for a living. After learning that his mother was ill, Aiman went straight to the hospital and his mother died. A week later, the insurance company where Aiman worked was closed and there was a group of men prying on the door of the insurance company’s office. Then they chased Aiman and he hid. Aiman tried to call his friend, but failed, so he threw away his mobile phone. The problem that befell him made Aiman always quarrel with his father, Aiman stared at the condominium thinking about the problem that befell him with his friend, Zahid (Pekin Ibrahim) who was injured in the right leg due to a motorcycle accident, came to him and greeted him. One day, Aiman prayed that the problem would disappear in the blink of an eye. Fate befell him again when Aiman was captured by a group of thugs, then beaten without mercy. Aiman fainted on the road, Dr. Yap come take him home. The next day, when he woke up, he found that he was alone. All human beings are gone. At first he was looking for someone else but after a while, he became fun because he didn’t have to think about the problems that were there. He can do everything without having to think long. At the same time, Aiman is actually looking for answers to every question present in his life.

Hassan, accompanied by Zahid lodged a police report regarding Aiman's disappearance. At the crossroads, Hassan and Zahid followed Dr. Yep up to his house. Hassan broke into Dr. Yep when the doctor came out. Meanwhile, Aiman stood in a bank building and fell, but was 'pulled' by the force of gravity. Aiman saw a shadow of himself, then was taken to the realm of hallucinations and treated in a cell. He then attacks two men who are similar to him and brings out a woman named Maya (Bella Dally), then they are both taken to a fantasy realm, Aiman and Maya see a flock of fish floating in the sky, and are followed by a dinosaur and even a spaceship. They both ascended to heaven. Hassan and Zahid were involved in an accident while on their way to the police station. Aiman and Maya walk around the park, the lake and then in the city, they both recount the situation they faced and Aiman is pounded by his fiery shadow.

Aiman received treatment through machine treatment and Dr. Yap explained more details to him about his illness. Aiman is now aware that he has had Anton-Babinski syndrome since birth. ASP Kumar showed CCTV footage showing Aiman’s behavior, and Aiman once again underwent machine treatment. Dr. Yap takes him to the hospital where Aiman will receive actual treatment and he asks Dr. Yep where is his father. Dr. Yap brought Aiman to see his father who was treated at the same hospital due to an accident, Dr. Yap explained to Aiman that he thought Hassan was a thief and Zahid in a wheelchair called him.

Dr. Yap carries Aiman around the hospital, yet Aiman sees a shadow of himself and. There he met Maya who also suffered from the same disease he suffered from. Dr. Yap advised Aiman to take medicine to cure his illness, but he refused. Dr. Yap tells Aiman that he is likely to be blind. Aiman and Maya were taken to the Putrajaya Hospital compound by Dr. Yap who also brought the police. In the world of his imagination, Aiman asks Maya that he wants to bring her back to the real world. But Aiman was visited by his shadow. Aiman injured himself and continued to run all the way to the road. Returning to his imaginary world, Aiman runs away on a motorcycle and is chased by dinosaur, and is struck by an accident at a crossroads and his shadow comes back and wants to be with him until the Day of Judgment. Aiman begged for forgiveness from God and acknowledged everything was His test. Back in the real world, Aiman once again receives machine treatment and realizes his father was involved in a road accident after he saved Aiman.

At the end of the film, Dr. Yap held a press conference on the discovery of a cure for Anton-Babinski. Aiman and Maya, are now married and endowed with their baby. Maya has fully recovered from Anton-Babinski syndrome, while Aiman is now visually impaired due to side effects from machine treatment. Zahid came to Aiman's painting gallery and said hello. Aiman and Zahid rest in the park and Aiman talks about his direction and life.

== Cast ==
- Syamsul Yusof as Aiman
  - Haikal Al-Walik as young Aiman
- Bella Dally as Maya
- Jalaluddin Hassan as Hassan, Aiman's father
- Pekin Ibrahim as Zahid
- Aida Khalida as Aiman's mother
- Razib Salimin as Aiman's boss
- Jacky Kam as Doctor Yap
- Rizal Ashreff as Aiman's officemate
- C. Kumaresan as ASP Kumar
- Siraj Sheikh Alsagoff as Inspector Siraj

== Production ==
Desolasi was directed by Syafiq Yusof, who had previously directed SAM: Saya Amat Mencintaimu (2012), Abang Long Fadil (2014) and Villa Nabila (2015). It was based on his personal experience during his childhood. He also wrote the screenplay, which took three months to complete. Yusof commented in an interview with New Straits Times, "I love stories that challenge the mind, but for my own films, I don’t think it’s wise to present a story that’s too complex. What I’ve done for Desolasi is not too difficult to take in, but it does make you think a little."

Yusof's older brother, Syamsul Yusof was cast in a leading role as Aiman, which was initially given to Aaron Aziz, Adi Putra and Shaheizy Sam. Other cast members included Jalaluddin Hassan, Pekin Ibrahim, Bella Dally and Aida Khalida. Principal photography began on November 13, 2014 in Kuala Lumpur and Putrajaya. The film took 55 days to complete, and wrapped on 6 January 2015. Yusof utilized the metaphor of Anton-Babinski syndrome (cortical blindness), emptying the city of Kuala Lumpur of people through special effects.

== Release and reception ==
Desolasi was released on December 8, 2016. The movie grossed MYR2.5 million during its last day of screening. Angelin Yeoh of Star2 gave 3 out of 5 stars per 6/10 reviews.

== Awards ==
| Year | Award | Recipient | Category | Result |
|---|---|---|---|---|
| 2017 | 29th Malaysian Film Festival | Syafiq Yusof | Special Jury Award (Visual Special Effects) | Won |
| 2017 | 2017 PROFIMA Awards | Syafiq Yusof | Best Director | Won |
