= Elizabeth Tan (singer) =

Malaysian singer and actress (born 1993)

- 陈淑美
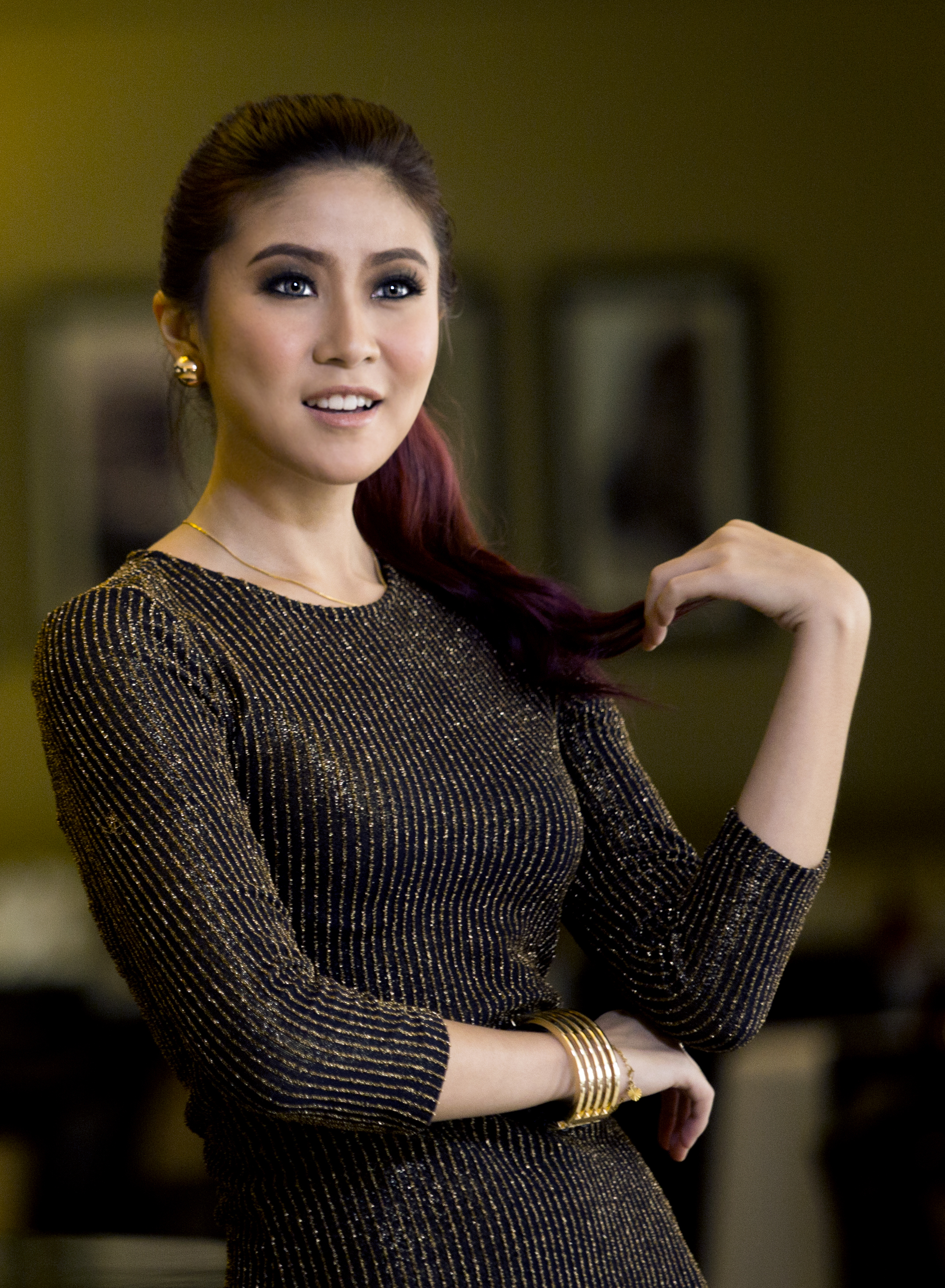
- Tan in 2016
- Born: Elizabeth Tan Su Mei; 18 November 1993 (age 32); Kuala Lumpur, Malaysia
- Other name: Lizzy
- Occupations: Singer; model; actress
- Years active: 2008–present
- Agent: Paranormal Talents (2013–2017)
- Spouse: Siew Jim (m. 2021)
- Musical career
- Genres: Pop, R&B
- Instrument: Vocals
- Label: Warner Music Malaysia
- Website: Official website

Elizabeth Tan

Chinese name
- Traditional Chinese: 譚蘇梅
- Simplified Chinese: 陈淑美
- Hanyu Pinyin: Tán Sūméi
- Pha̍k-fa-sṳ: Thàm Sû-mòi
- Jyutping: Taam4 Sou1 Mui4
- Hokkien POJ: Thâm So͘-mûi
- Tâi-lô: Thâm Soo-muî

Elizabeth Tan Su Mei (Chinese: 陈淑美; born 18 November 1993) is a Malaysian singer, model and actress of Chinese descent. Elizabeth began her music career in 2014 by producing her solo album, "Knock Knock", "Setia" featuring Faizal Tahir (2015), and "Tabah" (2016). Besides that, she began her acting career through the film "Usop Wilcha Meghonjang Makhluk Muzium" (2015), directed by Shy8. Her talent in the musical field was recognized as she was nominated for "Best New Artist" in the "Anugerah Planet Muzik" awards ceremony in 2015.

== Career ==
Elizabeth Tan, also known as Lizzy, began her music career by uploading videos on YouTube, sometimes only playing with a ukulele. Some of the cover songs that she played were "Pencuri" by Mark Adam, "Kantoi" by Zee Avi, "Maafkan Aku", and some other songs by Yuna, such as "Terukir Di Bintang", "Deeper Conversation" among several others.

She then received more attention from the public through the song “Havoc” which was originally sung by Joe Flizzow at the end of 2014. After the video was uploaded, she was contacted by several recording companies to be their recording artists.

=== Paranormal Talents ===
Elizabeth later became the artist of Faithful Music, which was owned by Faizal Tahir, which was under the management of Paranormal Talents. Elizabeth gained more Malay fans due to her fluent Malay and singing Malay songs. She has also appeared in one of the first official video clips, “Royals” by Lorde, whom Elizabeth was seen to duet with at No Noice Percussion. She came up with her solo album “Knock Knock” which was produced by Faizal and Mike Chan. The song is about a girl who warns people who are trying to approach and not hurt her heart and betray her feelings.

She also appeared in TV stations in Indonesia for several television programmes, such as “Sarah Sechan”, “Ini Talkshow” and “Music Everywhere”. Elizabeth had also sung “Selamat Hari Raya”, and the video was played throughout Ramadan. Elizabeth had made her first film appearance by teaming up with Usop Wilcha, through the comedy film “Usop Wilcha Meghonjang Makhluk Muzium”, directed by Mamat Khalid, where she acted as Tyra Vlad.

In January 2016, Elizabeth released “Are You Leaving Now” as her first English single. This song was written by Audi Mok, meanwhile, the lyrics were written by Elizabeth herself.

=== Going independent ===
She left Paranormal Talents on 15 March 2017 to manage her own career without the assistance of her personal assistance, while her contract with Faithful Music ended the same day.

Elizabeth was one among the 11 local and Indonesian singers who had re-recorded the song “Kau Ilhamku”. The singers involved were Man Bai, Joe Flizow, Siti Nurhaliza, as well as Indonesian singers, such as Afgan Syah Reza and Cita Citata. The song was promoted as an advertising jingle for a collaboration between a streaming service provider Yonder Music, and the telecommunication company Celcom Axiata.

In September 2016, Elizabeth, along with Faizal Tahir and Jaclyn Victor were involved in the #bersatuTENAGA campaign organized by Tenaga Nasional Berhad, where they sang the song “Terangi Hidupku”, in conjunction with the 53rd anniversary of the establishment of Malaysia on 16 September 2016.

Her new single, “SHH” was released in December 2016. Elizabeth released two of her singles in 2018 “Police Entry” which was released in July, followed by “Semua Sudah” in December.

On 31 July 2017, Elizabeth played the role of Maya Adrianna in a romcom drama series “My Darling, Inspektor Daniel”, published by Skop Productions, and directed by Aziz M. Osman. It was played through Mega Drama slot on Astro Ria, replacing the drama “Mencintaimu Mr. Photographer”. She collaborated with Aaron Aziz, Siti Elizad, Dazrin Kamarudin, and Erra Fazira.

She played the role of Suzy, a college student who practices a free lifestyle in Gerak Khas in the episode of “Jerat Kekasih”. Elizabeth became the main character alongside Zul Ariffin in the film directed by Syafiq Yusof, “Misteri Dilaila”, which aired on 21 February 2019. The film was filmed at Fraser’s Hills, Pahang, which also starred Rosyam Nor, Namron and Sasqia Dahuri. Besides that, she has also contributed her voice for the soundtrack of the film “Hidup Semula”. Elizabeth acted with Syafiq Kyle in the drama “Senafas Rindu” where she played two roles, as Vivianna/Siti Nur Ain.

== Discography ==
=== Single ===
Title	Year
"Knock Knock"	2014
"The World Can Wait"	2015
"Somewhere New" (Goldfish & Blink feat. Elizabeth Tan)	2015
"Setia" (with Faizal Tahir)	2015
"Are You Leaving Now"	2016
"Tabah"	2016
"Mama" (Aziz Harun feat. Elizabeth Tan)	2016
"Kini Masaku"	2016
"Darling"	2017
"Police Entry"	2018
"Semua Sudah"	2018
"Hidup Semula"	2019
"SHH"	2019
"Beku" (with Hazama)	2021
"Narsis" (with Zynakal)	2022
"Payung" (with Zizan Razak)	2022
"Tunggu"	2023
"Raya Cun"	2023
"Rezeki"	2025

== Filmography ==
Key
†	Denotes films/dramas that have not yet released

=== Film ===
Year	Title	Role	Notes
2015	Usop Wilcha Meghonjang Makhluk Muzium	Tyra Vlad	Debut film appearances
2018	Busker	Melissa	
2019	Misteri Dilaila	Dilaila	
2021	10 Tips Tipu Bini	Anna	
2021	Mat Bond Malaya	Bondi	
2022	Gila Gusti	Julia	
2022	Abang Long Fadil 3	Alice	
2022	Seratus	Woman #4	Cameo appearance
2023	Escape	Eva	
2024	Sheriff: Narko Integriti	Jennifer Wong	
TBA	Wantugo †	Isabelle	Post-production

=== Television series ===
Year	Title	Role	TV channel	Notes
2008	Gaia (Season 1)	Bella	Astro Ria	Episode: "Bella, Si Darling"
2017	My Darling, Inspektor Daniel	Maya Adrianna	Astro Ria	
2018	Misteri Jenazah (Season 1)	Zalia	Astro Prima	Episode: "Badi Zalia"
2018	Gerak Khas (Season 16)	Suzy	TV2	Episode: "Jerat Kekasih"
2019	Senafas Rindu	Vivianna/Siti Nur Ain	Astro Ria	
2021	Keluarga Baha Don (Season 3)	Krazie	Viu	
2021-2022	Gerak Khas Undercover	Elly / Sherin	TV3	
2022	Ex Aku Pontianak	Bella	Astro Ria	
2023	Special Force: Anarchy	Sara	Disney+ Hotstar	
2023	Alter-Naratif	Jane	Viu	Special appearance
2023	W: Two Worlds	Hanna	Viu	
2023	Nak Dengar Cerita Hantu?		DEGUP	
2024	Restu	Melanie	IQIYI	

=== Telemovie ===
Year	Title	Role	TV channel
2017	The Berlian Job	Datin Mona	Astro Citra
2017	Baby Bro	Herself (cameo)	Astro First Exclusive
2018	Kau Roadblock Hatiku	Herself (cameo)	Astro Citra
2019	Senafas Rindu Raya	Siti Nur Ain	Astro Ria
2020	Gadis Vroom Vroom	Sarah	TV2
2020	Ah How Putus Cinta	Shirley Tan	Awesome TV
2021	Penyiasat Viral	Sarah	TV2
2022	Satu Tong	Nikki	Gemilang TV & Astro Prima

=== Television ===
Year	Title	Role	TV channel	Notes
2016	Just Duet	Jury	NET.	with Once Mekel, Mey Chan and Mike Mohede
2017	29th Malaysian Film Festival	Host	Astro Ria	with Zizan Razak, Siti Elizad and Thanuja Ananthan
2022	Sepahtu Reunion Live	Cameo	Astro Warna	Episode: "Tapan Yang Disakiti"

== Videography ==
=== Music videos ===
Year	Title	Artist	Notes
2013	"Feel Good"	Paperplane Pursuit	Cameo

== Endorsements ==
Year	Products	Notes
2014	CIMB	
2014	DiGi	
2015	Hot FM	
2015	11Street	with Zizan Razak
2016	La Cremeria	
2017	Thermos	
2019	Power Cat	
2019	Ahmad Tea	
