= Abang Long Fadil 2 =

2017 Malaysian film

- Theatrical release poster
- Directed by: Syafiq Yusof
- Written by: Syafiq Yusof
- Screenplay by: Syafiq Yusof
- Based on: KL Gangster by Syamsul Yusof
- Produced by: Yusof Haslam
- Starring: Zizan Razak; Syamsul Yusof; AC Mizal; Tania Hudson; Wak Doyok; Achey Bocey; Shuib Sepahtu; A. Galak; Mas Khan
- Cinematography: Rahimi Maidin
- Edited by: Syafiq Yusof
- Music by: Ken Hor; Lo Shi Seng
- Production companies: Skop Productions; Astro Shaw
- Distributed by: Skop Productions; Astro Shaw
- Release dates: 24 August 2017 (Malaysia, Singapore & Brunei)
- Running time: 91 minutes
- Country: Malaysia
- Language: Malay
- Budget: MYR 3.2 million
- Box office: MYR 18.15 million

Abang Long Fadil 2 is a 2017 Malaysian Malay-language action comedy film written and directed by Syafiq Yusof. It is the sequel to KL Gangster spin-off 2014 film Abang Long Fadil, also written and directed by Syafiq Yusof. The film stars Zizan Razak, Syamsul Yusof, AC Mizal, Tania Hudson, Wak Doyok, Achey Bocey, Shuib Sepahtu, A. Galak, and Mas Khan. It is based on the KL Gangster character, Abang Long Fadil.

In Abang Long Fadil 2 the titular character is mistaken for a professional assassin named Tiger. He is unwillingly dragged into the underworld by mafia leader Taji Samprit and his son, Wak Doyok. Yana (Tania Hudson), Fadil's love interest, is a broadcast journalist assigned to cover Tiger's case, while Inspector Wahab (Syamsul Yusof) investigates.

Abang Long Fadil 2 was co-produced by Astro Shaw and Skop Productions. Filming took place in 2015, while post-production took two years to complete. The film was released on 24 August 2017 in 130 cinemas nationwide and remained in theaters for 56 days.

The film became a critical and commercial success, grossing over RM17.9 million, making it the highest-grossing Malaysian film of 2017 and the tenth highest-grossing Malaysian film of all time, beating 2015 Astro Shaw's film Polis Evo. The sequel, Abang Long Fadil 3, was released on 8 September 2022.

== Plot ==
Fadil becomes entangled in the mafia world controlled by Taji Samprit and his son, Wak Doyok. Hired by Datin Mona as a prostitute, he refuses and leaves her hotel room, where she is subsequently murdered. Security footage shows Fadil entering the room earlier, leading Inspectors Wahab and Shuib to mistake him for Tiger, a notorious mercenary.

Meanwhile, Yana, a TVKL reporter who frequently covers Tiger's murders, becomes involved when Wak orders Fadil to kill her. Fadil enters Yana's house and attempts to convince her that Tiger is responsible for the killings, but she knocks him unconscious. After regaining consciousness and being tied up by Yana and Ali, Fadil reveals the truth. Despite his innocence, he is forced to assume the identity of a murderer and mercenary. His first target is King Kong, a violent mafia boss and rival of Taji. To clear his name, Fadil must discover Tiger's true identity and expose the deception.

Disguised as a Bombay lawyer, Fadil visits King Kong's club to interrogate him but discovers that he has already been murdered. The police arrive and suspect Fadil, whom they believe to be Tiger. Wahab and his colleagues pursue him but are injured in an accident. Meanwhile, Wak pays Fadil RM10 million to kill Taji and retrieve a locket containing the key to a container holding his father's money. Wak intends to eliminate his father, who had previously ordered him to kill his own mother.

Wahab and Shuib visit Yana to question her about Datin Mona's murder and warn her that Tiger is dangerous. Subsequently, Yana, Ali and Fadil are attacked by Cobra, King Kong's brother, who seeks revenge for his sibling's death. Following a car crash, Fadil tells Yana and Ali to escape while he confronts Cobra. Fadil persuades Cobra to spare him and invites him to his house, where RM500,000 is hidden.

Elsewhere, Wak discovers that Taji is alive and has ordered his men, including Rudy, to attack him. Wak fights his father but is defeated. Taji attempts to kill his son but is instead murdered by Tiger, who reveals that Fadil was a subordinate gangster. Enraged, Wak orders Tiger to kill Fadil. Tiger agrees to help in exchange for half of the RM10 million.

Tiger and Wak subsequently take Yana hostage at a warehouse and demand that Fadil surrender the locket. Fadil obtains weapons and recruits Cobra to help him. At the warehouse, he throws the locket to Wak, who releases Yana. However, Tiger and Wak turn against Fadil, forcing him and Yana to flee. Cobra confronts Tiger to avenge King Kong's death, while Fadil attempts to kill Wak. Tiger points Fadil's AK-47 at him, and Yana aims her Glock at Tiger. Wahab and Shuib surround the warehouse.

Fadil accuses Wahab of corruption, prompting Shuib to point his weapon at his partner. Wahab explains that Fadil is innocent and reveals that he had assigned Rudy to work among Taji's men. He then exposes Tiger's true identity as Ali.

Ali admits that he developed feelings for Yana and continued killing people because he enjoyed the attention she gave Tiger. He had hoped to retire and be with her, but Yana reveals that she loves Fadil, disappointing him. When the police attempt to arrest Wak, Cobra arrives carrying an M16 fitted with a grenade launcher and tries to kill everyone, but misses with his grenade. He opens fire, and Ali eventually kills him.

Wahab and Shuib pursue Ali to an area containing explosive oil, which ignites when they shoot at it. Although Ali survives the explosion, Wahab shoots him dead. Meanwhile, Wak defeats Fadil in a fight and prepares to kill him, but Yana takes a bullet in her shoulder while protecting Fadil. Enraged, Fadil fights back and defeats Wak, who is arrested. Yana is taken to hospital, while Wahab and Shuib thank Fadil for helping the police and release him.

Fadil uses the key from the locket to open Taji's container, discovering the fortune hidden inside and becoming wealthy alongside Yana. He buys himself a car, and Datuk Yusof Haslam announces plans for another film, 'Abang Long Fadil 3, inspired by the Transformers franchise. However, the film does not reach cinemas because Fadil has been imprisoned.

== Cast ==
- Zizan Razak as Abang Long Fadil
- Syamsul Yusof as Inspector Wahab (Note: Yusuf, who previously played a villain as Shark in previous KL Gangster installments, portrays a completely different character in this film as an antihero cop. There is a scene in this film which Fadil mistook Inspector Wahab for Shark when the former is getting arrested by the police led by the latter.)
- AC Mizal in dual roles as Kingkong, Taji Samprit's partner who is killed by Tiger; and Cobra, Kingkong's twin brother
- Tania Hudson as Yana, TVKL reporter and Fadil's love-interest
- Wak Doyok as a fictionalized version of himself who is Taji Samprit's son
- Achey Bocey as Ali / Tiger, TVKL cameraman and Taji's assassin
- Shuib Sepahtu as Inspector Shuib
- A. Galak as Taji Samprit
- Mas Khan as Rudy, Inspector Wahab's undercover police

Supporting cast

- Delimawati as Datin Mona
- Hafiz Bahari as Kingkong's thug
- Syed Haikal as Security Guard
- Ashraf Rahman as Mat-motor

Special appearance

- Fad Anuar as cast
- Yusof Haslam as himself

== Production ==
The pre-production launching ceremony was held on 13 November 2015 at Haslam Restaurant, Kuala Lumpur. Film production started on 15 November 2015, with shooting taking place around Kuala Lumpur, Port Klang, and Putrajaya for 50 days. Around 30% of the film involved computer-generated imagery.

== Soundtrack ==
"Senorita"

Single by Syamsul Yusof & AC Mizal featuring Shuib
- Released: 2017
- Recorded: 2017
- Genre: Hip hop
- Length: 3:43
- Label: Arteeffects; President Productions
- Songwriters: Syamsul Yusof; Anwar Fazal
- Producer: Astro Shaw

The original soundtrack for this film is "Senorita" by Syamsul Yusof and AC Mizal, featuring Shuib. The music video for the song was uploaded to YouTube on 1 August 2017 and received a positive response from local audiences.

== Sequel ==
According to Yusof Haslam, due to the success of Abang Long Fadil 2, Skop Productions has green-lit the sequel, Abang Long Fadil 3, with a budget of RM4 million. Filming will start after the Aidilfitri celebration, by the end of June 2018.

== See also ==
- List of Malaysian films of 2017
- Cinema of Malaysia
