= Mat Moto =

2016 film by Pekin Ibrahim

- Film poster
- Directed by: Pekin Ibrahim; Syafiq Yusof
- Written by: Pekin Ibrahim
- Produced by: Yusof Haslam; Syafiq Yusof
- Starring: Pekin Ibrahim; Rosyam Nor; Zul Huzaimy; Faizal Hussein; Syamsul Yusof; Shaheizy Sam; Cat Farish; Kamarool Hj. Yusof; Falisha Crossley; Hakim Nawawi
- Cinematography: Raja Mukhriz
- Edited by: Akashdeep Singh
- Music by: Monoloque; Faizal Karim; Pekin Ibrahim
- Production companies: G&Kin Productions
- Distributed by: Skop Productions; Viper Studios; FIMTAB
- Release date: 14 January 2016
- Running time: 110 minutes
- Country: Malaysia
- Language: Malay
- Budget: RM 1 million
- Box office: RM 4.39 million

Mat Moto: Kami Mat Moto, Bukan Mat Rempit (or simply Mat Moto) is a 2016 Malaysian Malay-language action adventure film co-directed by Pekin Ibrahim and Syafiq Yusof. The screenplay was written by Pekin Ibrahim and marks his directorial debut. It features an ensemble cast including Pekin himself, Rosyam Nor, Zul Huzaimy, Faizal Hussein, Cat Farish, Syamsul Yusof, Shaheizy Sam, Kamarool Hj. Yusof, Falisha Crossley, and Hakim Nawawi.

The film was based on a true story and follows AL (Pekin Ibrahim), the owner of a film editing company, travelling to four states in Malaysia to fulfill a promise he made to his late friend to collect four special helmets. The film was released on 14 January 2016, and opened to a wide audience, receiving positive reviews. The film won three out of eight nominations in the 28th Malaysia Film Festival.

== Plot ==
AL (Pekin Ibrahim) is the owner of a film editing company. He travels to four states in Peninsular Malaysia to fulfill a promise to his best friend whereby he must collect four special helmets, all of which are highly coveted by motorcycle enthusiasts across the country. He is accompanied by Sikha (Falisha Crossley), a practical student at AL's office. AL gives her a camera recorder to document their long journey.

On the road, Sikha asked AL's reason for driving such a long way to retrieve the helmets. He explains that he has undertaken the task because of friendship, but he does not elaborate. Upon arrival at Kuala Terengganu, AL meets Farouk (Kamarool Hj Yusof) and buys a helmet estimated to cost RM 200 thousand. They travel to Kota Bharu, however upon arrival, AL's motorcycle is damaged. He meets with Pit (Faizal Hussein) and buys another helmet. Afterwards, Sikha urges AL to tell her why his friend did not come with them.

AL drives the car to Georgetown, Penang and meets Mus (Syamsul Yusof). Sikha is interrupted by a set of motto mats before being saved by Mus and AL. AL then buys another helmet from Mus, bringing the number of helmets to three. AL's action saves Sikha and causes her to feel loved by him. After AL explains that he sees Sikha only as an assistant, Sikha is disappointed. AL goes on a trip to Malacca to get the final helmet. There, they meet Acai (Shaheizy Sam).

AL reminisces his old memories with Spark (Zul Huzaimy), who wished to have 4 helmets – white Magnum Super, orange LTD, yellow J-Force Jack and Arai Okada. While on his way to send documents, Spark was involved in an accident after a motorcyclist lost control of his motorbike after colliding with a Suzuki Swift car (it was turned to be drove by Sikha). Spark was then mercilessly beaten by the crowd for allegedly being a mat rempits. AL came to help Spark but he can't do so as he was stopped by one of the crowd. Spark was taken to the hospital, AL was informed by the doctor that Spark's condition was critical. Hours later, Spark dies.

After successfully collecting 4 rare helmets, fulfilling his promises to Spark; AL and Sikha decided to return to Kuala Lumpur. While on the way, Sikha made a confession to him that she was the cause of his friend's death. Sikha, who was busy using a mobile phone while driving, didn't notice that he had violated the traffic light which caused a motorcyclist to almost hit her. She saw Spark fall from his motorcycle. Sikha observes AL and Spark from afar. After telling the real thing to AL, Sikha was left by him.

Soon after, AL received a lot of thanks from the public without realizing what he had done. While arriving at a shoe store at a night market, a shoe store owner wanted to take a picture with AL even though AL insist that he is not a celebrity. AL realized that his video became viral on YouTube after the shoe store owner advise him. AL then went back to his office and watched the video clip Kami Mat Moto Bukan Mat Rempit uploaded by Sikha. AL has chased Macha (Cat Farish) who stole his Bell bag. He blames Macha because of bikers like him, people misunderstand Mat Moto, he then take back his bag stolen by Macha. AL then gives money to Macha and asks him to find a proper job. In the video she uploaded, Sikha apologized to AL.

AL was advised by his close friend, Bangcik to be patient in facing trials. Meanwhile, AL tried to call Sikha but she did not answer the call. While on the way, AL was approached by Shahrul (Rosyam Nor) and racing each other. The film ends with AL, who is now studying religion, poses with some helmets that he has collected, insist that each of them has their own story.

== Cast ==
- Pekin Ibrahim as Al
- Shaheizy Sam as Acai
- Syamsul Yusof as Mus
- Rosyam Nor as Shahrul
- Falisha Crossley as Sikha
- Faizal Hussein as Pit
- Cat Farish as Macha
- Kamarool Hj. Yusof as Farouk
- Zul Huzaimy as Spark
- Nazri Nawawi as Osman

== Production ==
Mat Moto was based on a true story. It was directed and written by Pekin Ibrahim and it is his directorial debut. Syafiq Yusof served as a co-director. TV host turned actress Falisha Crossley was chosen to play Sikha. For the role, she had her hair shortened.

Principal photography on the film took 23 days to complete between May and June 2015 in several states of Malaysia including Kedah, Terengganu and Kelantan. The film was specially dedicated to Pekin's late friend, Azwan Annuar, who died on 18 April 2015 due to congenital heart disease.

== Release and reception ==
Mat Moto’s official trailer was released on 21 November 2015, and its official theatrical release was on 14 January 2016. The film grossed RM 1 million on the day of its premiere, and grossed RM 3 million after just four days. The box office gross increased to RM 4.39 million within 21 days.
