= Nam Ron =

Malaysian film director

- Born: Shahili bin Abdan; 21 November 1969 (age 56); Kangar, Perlis, Malaysia
- Other names: Nam Ron, Tok Ayah
- Education: Akademi Seni Budaya & Warisan Kebangsaan (ASWARA)IKM JASIN
- Occupations: Film director, actor, theater activist
- Years active: 1989–present
- Spouse: June Lojong (m. 2004)
- Children: 3

Shahili Abdan or known by his theatrical name as Nam Ron (born 21 November 1969) is a Malaysian film director, actor and theatrical activist. He is listed as one of the best actors in decade by Harian Metro.

His best directed film, One Two Jaga (2018) won ASEAN Film Festival on 2019.

== Bibliography ==
- Namron (2009) Laut Lebih Indah Dari Bulan: Antologi Skrip Teater Namron, Kuala Lumpur, Oxygen Media.
