= Abang Long Fadil 3 =

- Official theatrical poster
- Directed by: Syafiq Yusof
- Written by: Syafiq Yusof; MF Kencana; Effendi K
- Produced by: Yusof Haslam
- Starring: Zizan Razak; Elizabeth Tan; Maya Karin; AC Mizal
- Cinematography: Rahimi Maidin
- Edited by: Syafiq Yusof
- Music by: Ken Hor; Lo Shi Seng
- Production companies: Skop Productions; Astro Shaw
- Release dates: 8 September 2022 (Malaysia, Singapore & Brunei)
- Running time: 105 minutes
- Country: Malaysia
- Language: Malay
- Budget: MYR 6 million
- Box office: MYR 25 million

Abang Long Fadil 3 is a 2022 Malaysian Malay-language spy action comedy film directed by Syafiq Yusof with screenplay by Syafiq and MF Kencana; co-produced by Skop Productions and Astro Shaw. A sequel to Abang Long Fadil 2 (2017) and the third series in the Abang Long Fadil franchise, the film retains Zizan Razak as Fadil and co-stars Johan Raja Lawak, Elizabeth Tan, Maya Karin, AC Mizal, Shuib Sepahtu, Kazar Saisi, Ozlynn Waty, Tania Hudson, Wak Doyok and Daniella Sya. The film tells the story of Fadil who serves as a National Secret Service (NSS) spy agent, on a mission to bring down Chow Han's evil conspiracy, while he is being hunted by King Cobra for revenge.

== Synopsis ==
Tells about the life of Fadil (Zizan Razak) who got an offer from N.S.S. (National Secret Service) to become a professional agent or spy in bringing down the biggest gang S.S.O. (Secret Society Organization) led by Chow Han (Johan Raja Lawak). Chow Han and his group have evil intentions to conquer the country of the archipelago and take over the government from the President of the Republic of the archipelago. Agent Fadil and Agent Alice (Elizabeth Tan) work together to defeat Chow Han's evil conspiracy.

However, the mission became more complicated when Fadil's ex-girlfriend, Yana (Tania Hudson), interfered with the N.S.S. thus delaying the mission that had been set by Chief Kazar (Kazar Saisi). Chow Han realizes that he has been spied on by the N.S.S., so he sends a King Cobra (AC Mizal) assassin to eliminate Fadil and Alice.

== Cast ==
- Zizan Razak as Abang Long Fadil and Jefri (two characters)
- Johan Raja Lawak as Chow Han, Head of the Secret Society Organization and mastermind of Project 666
- Elizabeth Tan as Alice, a National Secret Service Agent
- Maya Karin as Ejen Maya, Corrupt National Secret Service Agent (daughter of Chief Kazar and sister of Prof. Amirul and Jefri)
- Dato' AC Mizal as King Cobra and King Kali Kong, (Note: King Kali Kong wasn't credited on the film.) the third and fourth twins of King Kong and Cobra
- Ozlynn Waty as Ocy Lin, Chow Han's wife
- Tania Hudson as Yana, a TVKL reporter and Fadil's girlfriend
- Kazar Saisi as Chief Kazar, Head of the National Secret Service and the father of Agent Maya and Prof Amirul and also Jefri
- Khir Rahman as president, Head of State of the Republic of Nusantara
- Shuib Sepahtu as Inspector Shuib
- Siraj Alsagoff as Inspector Sahab, Police Officer of the Republic of Nusantara
- Joey Daud as Prof. Joey
- Jay Iswazir as Prof. Amirul, younger brother of Agent Maya, son of Chief Kazar and creator of Project 666
- Daniella Sya as Sherina, King Cobra's assistant (crossover from KL Gangster: Underworld)
- Wak Doyok as himself
- Hairul Azreen as Prison Officer
- Yusof Haslam as Film Director

Hamdan Ramli, Deen Maidin and Farid Amirul made a special appearance. In addition, Fattah Amin also made a cameo appearance through photographs in this film.

== Box Office ==
Abang Long Fadil 3 opened an outstanding record when it managed to collect RM1.2 million in one night. The quote was recorded through an early preview screening of the film the day before the official premiere. The film managed to collect RM3 million on the first day of release. On the fifth day of its release, the film managed to collect RM10 million. The collection continued to increase by RM18 million within 11 days of release in cinemas. Astro Awani reported that this film managed to collect RM22 million thus breaking the record of the previous sequel, Abang Long Fadil 2 which collected RM18 million in 45 days. Within a month of its release, the film's collection increased by RM24 million. By the end of the screening in cinemas, the film collected RM24.2 million locally and RM25 million from Malaysia, Singapore and Brunei.
