= Rosyam Nor =

Malaysian actor, television host and film producer

Yang Berbahagia Datuk Rosyam Nor DPSM
- رشام نور
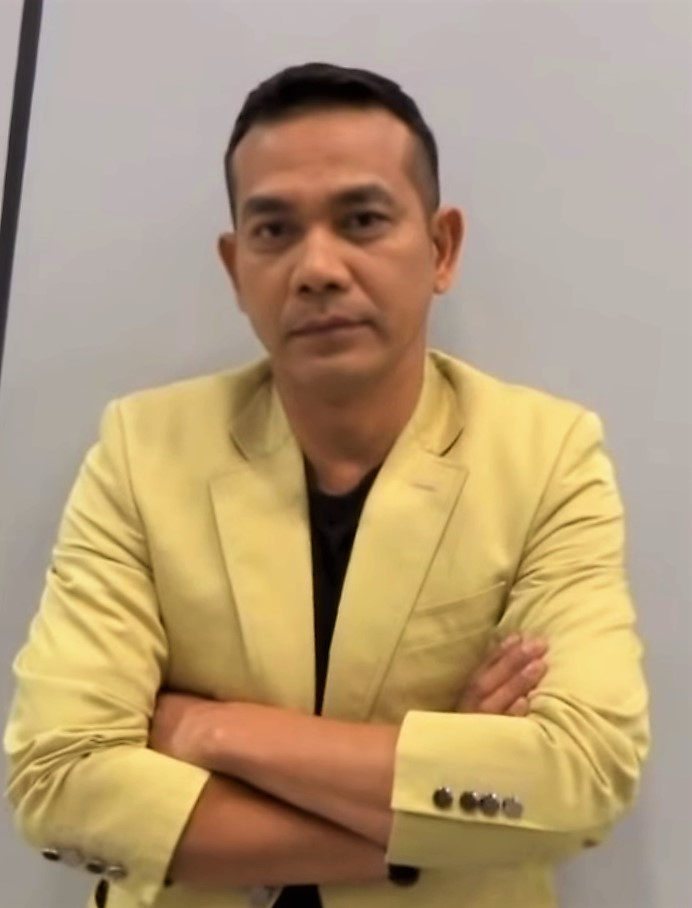
- Rosyam Nor on MeleTOP in 2014
- Born: Mohamed Noor bin Shamsuddin; 1 March 1967 (age 59); Kampung Kerinchi, Kuala Lumpur, Selangor (now Malaysia Federal Territory)
- Occupations: Actor, television host, film producer, entrepreneur
- Years active: 1986–present
- Employer(s): Suhan Movies & Trading
- Spouse: Datin Runika Mohd. Yusof (m. 1989)
- Children: 5
- Parents: Shamsuddin Mohd. Yusof (father); Rubiah Kamaruddin (mother)
- Relatives: Faizal Hussein (cousin)

Datuk Mohamed Noor bin Shamsuddin (born 1 March 1967), known professionally as Rosyam Nor, is a Malaysian actor, television host and film producer.

== Early career ==
He first ventured into acting in Gila-Gila Remaja, a 1986 film about youngsters in Malaysia alongside his cousin, Faizal Hussein as the lead role. After acting in several films, he got his first leading role through Suami, Isteri, dan... in 1996. He is known for his versatility in acting and has since then garnered many awards in Malaysia's film industry.

== Personal life ==
Rosyam married Runika Mohd Yusoff in 1989 and has five daughters. He became a grandfather in 2014.

His father, Shamsuddin Mohd Yusof died on 26 January 2008, due to kidney failure and pneumonia.

== Filmography ==
Key
Denotes film/dramas that have not yet been released

=== Feature films ===
Year	Title	Credited as		Role	Notes
Year	Title	Actor	Producer	Role	Notes
1986	Gila-Gila Remaja	Yes	No	Remy	
1987	Sayang	Yes	No	Don	
1988	Jiran	Yes	No	Jamal	
1988	Perawan Malam	Yes	No	Kamis	
1989	Tak Kisahlah Beb!	Yes	No	Halim	
1991	Boss	Yes	No	Konco	
1991	Kanta Serigala	Yes	No	Imran	
1993	Perempuan, Isteri.....?	No	Yes	—	Also as executive producer
1993	Azizah The Legend	Yes	No	Aziz	Dubbing voice
1995	Cinta Kita	No	Yes	—	As executive producer
1995	Jimi Asmara	Yes	No	Dzul Fakar	
1996	Suami, Isteri dan.....?	Yes	Yes	Fatah	As executive producer
1998	Maria Mariana II	Yes	No	Remy	
1998	Lenjan	Yes	No	Zarin	
1998	Nafas Cinta	Yes	No	Sham	
1999	Bara	Yes	No	Carlos	
2001	Gerak Khas The Movie	Yes	No	Castello	
2001	Spinning Gasing	Yes	No	Zainal	
2002	KL Menjerit	Yes	No	Shahrol Mohammad	
2003	Laila Isabella	Yes	No	Azam	
2003	Janji Diana	Yes	No	Haikal	
2003	MX3	Yes	No	Castello/Castella	
2004	Bisikan Remaja	Yes	No	Comando Razak	
2004	Pontianak Harum Sundal Malam	Yes	No	Asmadi Marsani	
2004	Berlari Ke Langit	Yes	No	Indra Che Muda	
2005	Gangster	Yes	No	Rosli/Legau/Nala	
2005	Senario XX	Yes	No	Himself / Rosman	He uses Mazlan Ahmad voice
2005	KL Menjerit 1	Yes	No	Shahrol Mohammad	
2005	Pontianak Harum Sundal Malam II	Yes	No	Asmadi Marsani	
2006	Castello	Yes	Yes	Castello	
2006	Bilut	Yes	No	Yazid	
2007	Syaitan	Yes	No	Muslim	
2007	Anak Halal	Yes	No	Hisham	
2008	Kala Malam Bulan Mengambang	Yes	No	Salleh	
2008	Apa Kata Hati?	Yes	No	Host TV	He became a Lawyer for capital television programs Modal Insan.
2010	Estet	Yes	No	Kublai Khan	
2011	Libas	Yes	No	Adnan Saladin	
2013	KL Gangster 2	Yes	No	Tailong	
2014	Balistik	Yes	Yes	Saga	Also as writer
2014	Ah Beng: Mission Impossible	Yes	No		
2014	Laga	Yes	No	Inspector Jefri	
2015	Isyarat Cinta	No	Yes	—	
2015	The Noise	Yes	No		
2015	Chowrasta	Yes	No	Pak Ngah Don	
2016	Mat Moto	Yes	No	Shahrol Mohammad	
2016	Kabali	Yes	No	Pak Bacak	Indian - Tamil film
2017	Rempit Sampai Langit	No	Yes	—	
2018	KL Special Force	Yes	No	DSP Roslan	
2018	Lee Chong Wei: Rise Of The Legend	Yes	No	Misbun Sidek	
2019	Misteri Dilaila	Yes	No	Inspector Azman	
2019	Motif	Yes	No	Hussein	
2021	J2: J Retribusi	Yes	No	Dato' Hashim	
2021	Proksi	Yes	No	Remy	
2021	G Storm	Yes	No	King	Hong Kong film
2022	Juang	Yes	Yes	Captain	As executive producer
2022	Deleted: Akan Ku Jejak!	Yes	No	Ali Yusof	
2023	Duan Nago Bogho	Yes	No	Fendi Bukit Bintang	
2024	Memoir Seorang Guru	Yes	No	Teacher Sunan	
2025	Keluang Man	Yes	No	Ahmad / Mata Batu	
2025	Banduan	Yes	No	Inspector johari	
2026	Pewaris Susuk	Yes	No	Hadif	

=== Television ===
Year	Title	Role	TV channel
2009–2012	Pilih Kasih	Director	TV2
2006–2010	Fenomena Seni	Host	TV1
2007	Modal Insan	Host	Astro Prima
2014–2015	Dai - Pendakwah Milenia (Season 2 & 3)	Host with Zainal Ariffin Ismail	TV3
2015	Pelamin Fantasia	Permanent judges	Astro Ria
2016–2017	Dai - Pendakwah Nusantara (Season 4 & 5)	Host with Zainal Ariffin Ismail	TV3
2017	Maharaja Lawak Mega 2017	Permanent judges	Astro Mustika HD
2018	Dai - Pendakwah Nusantara (Season 6)	Host	TV3
2020	Keringat Selebriti	Guest	Awesome TV
2020	Debat Bukan Gaduh	Hakim	Awesome TV
2020	Macam-Macam Show	CEO	Awesome TV
2021	Keringat Selebriti 2	Host	Awesome TV
2021	Sembang Rawak	Host	Awesome TV
2021–2022	Sembang Viral	Host with Ahmad Fedtri Yahya	TV9
2022	Sembang Viral Mega	Host	TV9
2022	I Can See Your Voice Malaysia (season 5)	Jury	TV3

=== Television series ===
Year	Title	Credited as		Role	TV channel	Notes
Year	Title	Actor	Producer	Role	TV channel	Notes
1998	Tirai Sutera	Yes	No		TV3	
1998	Hanya Dikau	Yes	No		TV3	
1999	Tirai Sutera II	Yes	No		TV3	
1999	Nadia	Yes	No		TV3	
1999	Idaman (Season 2)	Yes	No	Azrain	Astro Ria	
1999–2001	Spanar Jaya	Yes	No	Syawal	NTV7	A few Episode
2000	Kabus dan Sinar	Yes	No		TV1	
2001	Kiranya Aku Tahu	Yes	No	Azeem	TV3	
2002	Maya Mira	Yes	No	Hisham	TV3	
2004	Rindu Semakin Jauh	Yes	Yes	Hakim	TV3	
2004	Masih Ada Cinta	Yes	No	Zahrul	TV3	
2005–2006	Biarku Sentuh Cintamu	Yes	Yes	Daniel Lokman	TV3	
2006–2007	CID 3278	Yes	Yes	Ray	TV9	Special appearance
2007	Sesuci Cinta Sofiyya	Yes	Yes	Johan	TV3	
2007	Dinasti Bilut	Yes	Yes	Daniel	TV1	
2008	Abadi Sebuah Cinta	Yes	Yes	Inspector Qayyum	TV3	
2008	Iris	Yes	Yes	Danish	TV3	
2008	Ku Milikmu	No	Yes	—	TV3	
2009	Rozanna	Yes	Yes	Fareez	TV3	
2010	Isabella	Yes	Yes	Nazman	Astro Prima	
2010	Nigina	Yes	Yes	Iskandar	TV3	
2010–2011	Gelora Di Hati Sara	Yes	Yes	Asrul	TV2	
2011	Antara Maghrib Dan Isyak	No	Yes	—	TV3	
2011	Cinta Elysa	No	Yes	—	TV3	
2011–2012	Trilogi Cinta	Yes	Yes	Razif	TV1	
2012	Bunga-Bunga Syurga	No	Yes	—	TV3	
2012	Setia Hujung Nyawa	No	Yes	—	TV3	
2014	7 Suami	No	Yes	—	TV3	
2014	Anugerah Terindah	No	Yes	—	TV3	
2014	Fajar Aiman	No	Yes	—	TV3	
2014	Bila Hati Berbicara	No	Yes	—	TV3	
2015	Tersuka Tanpa Sengaja	No	Yes	—	Astro Ria	
2016	Kerambit	No	Yes	—	TV2	
2016	Dawai Asmara	No	Yes	—	TV9	
2016	Tika Langit Terbuka	No	Yes	—	Astro Oasis	
2016–2017	Cinta Roller Coaster	No	Yes	—	TV3	
2017–2018	Bilo Nogori Jupo Kelate	No	Yes	—	TV3	
2018	Tak Ada Cinta Sepertimu	No	Yes	—	Astro Ria	
2018	Suamiku Mat Piun	No	Yes	—	TV3	
2018	Pengantin 100 Hari	No	Yes	—	TV3	
2018	Jangan Benci Cintaku	No	Yes	—	TV3	
2018	Cik Reen & Encik Ngok Ngek	No	Yes	—	Astro Ria	
2018	Rahasia Kasih	No	Yes	—	NTV7	
2018	Jangan Padam Rindu	No	Yes	—	TV Okey	
2018–2019	Selafaz Cinta	No	Yes	—	Astro Prima	
2019	Encik Iman Ekspres	No	Yes	—	Astro Ria	
2019	Sara Kirana	No	Yes	—	Astro Ria	
2019	Kamar Kamariah	No	Yes	—	TV3	
2019	30 Pesanan Suara	No	Yes	—	TV3	
2019	Satukan Rasa	No	Yes	—	Astro Ria	
2020	Titian Takdir	No	Yes	—	TV3	
2020	Pelindung Seorang Puteri	No	Yes	—	Astro Ria	
2020	Cinta Sekali Lagi	No	Yes	—	TV3	
2020	Beri Sedikit Waktu	No	Yes	—	TV3	
2020–2021	Potong	Yes	No	Tok Bomoh	Astro Warna	
2020–2021	Tercipta Satu Ikatan	No	Yes	—	Astro Ria	
2021	Man Transform	Yes	Yes	Tailong	Awesome TV	
2021	Sabarlah Duhai Hati	Yes	Yes		TV3	Special appearance
2021	Cik Ayu Mee Sanggul	Yes	Yes	Tuan Baharom	Astro Ria	
2021	Cinta Yang Pulang	No	Yes	—	TV2	
2021	Gerak Khas Undercover (Season 1)	Yes	No	Tony Bono	TV3	Episode: "Tony Bono"
2022	Derhaka Cinta Jebat	No	Yes	—	TV1	
2022	Selamanya Suri Cinta	No	Yes	—	TV9	
2022	Reen Putus Cinta	Yes	No		Awesome TV	
2022	Ash & Aish	Yes	Yes	Aziz Irfan	Astro Ria	Special appearance
2022	Kids Nowadays	No	Yes	—	Astro Ria	
2022	Tiada Maaf Buatmu	No	Yes	—	Astro Ria	
2023	Derhaka Sebuah Cinta	No	Yes	—	Astro Ria	
2023	Kami Budak Band	No	Yes	—	TV3	
2023	Cinta Yang Tertangguh	No	Yes	—	TV1	
2023	Jack Yusof	Yes	No	Jack Yusof	Astro Ria	
2023	Beautiful Love Revenge	No	Yes	—	Astro Ria	
2023	Sempurnakah Cinta Kita?	No	Yes	—	Awesome TV	
2023	Upin & Ipin (Season 17)	Yes	No	Himself	Astro Prima	Special appearance; Episode: "Secebis Kenangan Abah"
2024	I.D.	Yes	No	Dato Rahim Abadi	Astro Premier	
2024	Nuh & Nayla	No	Yes	—	TV3	
2024	X-Change	Yes	No	Yacob	Astro Premier	
2024	Ternyata Sebuah Bahagia	No	Yes	—	Astro Ria	

=== Telemovie ===
Year	Title	Credited as		Role	TV channel
Year	Title	Actor	Producer	Role	TV channel
1994	Korban	Yes	No		TV3
1995	Siapa Bunuh Alice?	Yes	No		TV2
1995	Orang Terbang	Yes	No	Jeff	TV3
1998	Tuminah	Yes	No	Faisal	TV3
1999	Takbir Untuk Abah	Yes	No		TV1
1999	Di Sebalik Malam	Yes	No		TV3
2000	Playboy Pencen	Yes	No	Dr Jay	VCD
2000	Satu Hari Di Hari Raya	Yes	No		TV2
2002	Pondok Buruk	Yes	No	Usop	Astro Ria
2002	Nurfitri	Yes	Yes	Latif	TV3
2002	Rumah Ditengah Sawah	Yes	Yes	Khalid	TV3
2003	Najwa	Yes	No	Nasir	TV1
2003	Pondok Buruk 2	Yes	No	Usop	Astro Ria
2003	Che Mat	Yes	No	Che Mat	TV3
2003	Sekeras Kerikil	Yes	Yes	Busu/Roslan	TV3
2006	Daun Ketupat Kering	Yes	Yes	Along	TV2
2007	Lahad	Yes	Yes	Amir	TV2
2008	Mengejar Sinar	No	Yes	—	TV3
2008	Takdir Sedang Berbisik	No	Yes	—	TV3
2009	Salam Terakhir	Yes	Yes	Nazman	TV3
2009	Kaki	Yes	Yes		TV1
2010	Cinta Selat Tebrau	Yes	Yes		TV1
2010	Sutera Di Sebalik Wajah	Yes	Yes	Sufian	TV3
2012	Neraka Abah	No	Yes	—	TV9
2013	Mawar Putih Tanda Perpisahan	Yes	Yes	Sudin	Astro Box Office
2014	Perjalanan	Yes	Yes	Ramli	TV3
2014	Kata Samseng	Yes	Yes	Mokhsin	TV2
2016	Terputusnya Sebuah Doa	Yes	Yes	Habil	Astro Ria
2016	Tribute P. Ramlee: Aku dan Dia	No	Yes	—	TV1
2018	Pendosa Ingin Ke Syurga	Yes	Yes	Sufian/Shawn	TV3
2018	Mentari	Yes	Yes	Ikmal Fansuri	TV3
2019	Wakaf Dosa	Yes	Yes	Bakri Zain	TV3
2019	Papa Segera	No	Yes	—	TV1
2021	Rujuk	Yes	Yes	Jefry	TV2
2022	Jangan Malu Menangis	Yes	Yes	Ramlee	TV9
2023	Quran Pondok Buruk	Yes	No	Usop	Astro Ria
2025	Bendasing	Yes	No		TV3

== Awards and nominations ==
=== Asia Pacific Film Festival ===
- Best Supporting Actor for Lenjan (1999)
- Best Actor for Bilut (2006)

=== Malaysia Film Festival ===
- Best Supporting Actor (Festival Filem Malaysia ke-14)
- Best Actor (Festival Filem Malaysia ke-16)
- Best Supporting Actor (Festival Filem Malaysia ke-17)
- Best Actor (Festival Filem Malaysia ke-21)
- Best Supporting Actor (Festival Filem Malaysia ke-26)

=== Anugerah Skrin ===
- Best Supporting Actor (Anugerah Skrin 1999)
- Best Actor (Anugerah Skrin 2003)
- Best Supporting Actor (Anugerah Skrin 2004)
- Best Actor (Anugerah Skrin 2008)

=== Anugerah Bintang Popular Berita Harian ===
- Most Popular Film Actor (Anugerah Bintang Popular Berita Harian 1997/98)
- Most Popular Film Actor (Anugerah Bintang Popular Berita Harian 1998/99)
- Most Popular TV Actor (Anugerah Bintang Popular Berita Harian 2002)
- Most Popular Film Actor (Anugerah Bintang Popular Berita Harian 2002)
- Most Popular Artiste (Anugerah Bintang Popular Berita Harian 2002)
- Most Popular Film Actor (Anugerah Bintang Popular Berita Harian 2003)
- Most Popular TV Actor (Anugerah Bintang Popular Berita Harian 2005)
- Most Popular TV Actor (Anugerah Bintang Popular Berita Harian 2006)
- Most Popular TV Actor (Anugerah Bintang Popular Berita Harian 2007)
- Most Popular TV Actor (Anugerah Bintang Popular Berita Harian 2008)
- Most Popular TV Actor (Anugerah Bintang Popular Berita Harian 2009)

=== Anugerah Seri Angkasa ===
- Best TV Actor (Anugerah Sri Angkasa 2000)

== Controversies ==
In 2017, Rosyam was criticized and blamed for failing to carry out as moderator task fairly and efficiently at the Transformasi Nasional 2050 (TN50) dialogue session for the entertainment industry with Najib Razak at the prime minister's official residence at Putrajaya which saw him mishandling a scuffle between film producer David Teo and comedian Sulaiman Yassin, better known as "Mat Over". Rosyam amid being embarrassed and had to apologise personally to Najib, remained boastful of his own credibility by claiming that Najib was fond of himself as the event emcee.

After the downfall of Najib Razak and Barisan Nasional (BN) in the 2018 general election, a boycott was called in the social media towards newly opened supermarket on 1 June, ST Rosyam Mart in Setiawangsa, Kuala Lumpur, said to be owned by Rosyam who was widely known as a supporter of the disgraced ex-prime minister. But in January 2019, allegations that Rosyam has never fully own and he is just an ambassador of the supermarket started to be viral in the social media. He was slammed for becoming the "barua Cina" or Chinese stooge made use by the Sri Ternak Group's Ho Ah Chai, the real owner of the supermarket to attract and deceive its customers. Only a month later after the viral accusation, he finally and publicly admits he is just a minority shareholder owning merely 10 per cent shares in the ST Rosyam Mart supermarket.

Rosyam was again embroiled in political polemic of both divides where his dignity and even business ventures were in questions when a visit was arranged for the new Pakatan Harapan (PH) government Minister of Agriculture and Agro-based Industry, Salahuddin Ayub ahead of an official event to the jackfruit farm and fish pond owned by him in Lanchang, Pahang on 16 April 2019.

He has demonstrated outdated and sexist views of women in a TikTok interview in 2023.

== Honours ==
=== Honours of Malaysia ===
- Malacca
  - Companion Class II of the Exalted Order of Malacca (DPSM) – Datuk (2013)
