= Abang Long Fadil =

2014 Malaysian film

- Directed by: Syafiq Yusof
- Written by: Syafiq Yusof
- Screenplay by: Syafiq Yusof
- Based on: KL Gangster by Syamsul Yusof
- Produced by: Yusof Haslam
- Starring: Zizan Razak; Kamal Adli; Tauke Jambu; Soffi Jikan; Aaron Aziz; Yassin Yahya; Syamsul Yusof; Harun Salim Bachik
- Edited by: Syafiq Yusof
- Production company: Skop Productions
- Release date: 29 May 2014
- Running time: 101 minutes
- Country: Malaysia
- Language: Malay
- Budget: MYR 3 million
- Box office: MYR 4.6 million

Abang Long Fadil is a 2014 Malaysian Malay-language action comedy film written and directed by Syafiq Yusof. It features an ensemble cast including Zizan Razak, Kamal Adli, Tauke Jambu, Soffi Jikan, Aaron Aziz, Yassin Yahya and the late Harun Salim Bachik. The film is the spin-off from 2011 film KL Gangster directed by Syafiq's older brother Syamsul Yusof and the first in Abang Long Fadil trilogy. The movie was released on May 29, 2014 and received positive reviews. The sequel Abang Long Fadil 2 was released on August 24, 2017, followed by the third sequel, Abang Long Fadil 3 released on September 8, 2022.

== Synopsis ==
Abang Long Fadil (Zizan Razak) did not want to interfere in the gangster world after his best friend, Malik (Aaron Aziz) was sentenced to five years imprisonment and wanted to be free from Shark's gang (Syamsul Yusof) but he has to carry out his last assignment as a gift to qualify for a gangster gang. Shark, the enemy in the blanket to Malik, was not happy with Fadil, and bullied Fadil by giving an impossible task to all the gangs at Kuala Lumpur to conquer the area of the Kampung Berani, a village settlement of the Malays who are facing a landowner's crisis of settlers with capitalist companies who have hired a gang of gangsters to threaten the villagers. At the same time, the area is held by a large unknown gangster. Various events took place in Fadil's attempt to conquer Kampung Berani. Inadvertently, Abang Long Fadil meets Adam (Kamal Adli) who is the son of a warrior and has amazing power. They joined forces against the gangsters in the area, eventually ending up with the largest gangster leader there.

== Cast ==
- Zizan Razak as Abang Long Fadil
- Kamal Adli as Adam
- Tauke Jambu as Acai
- Syamsul Yusof as Shark / Zack / Mus
- Aaron Aziz as Malek
- Soffi Jikan as Ajib
- Shiqin Kamal as Hawa
- Harun Salim Bachik as Pak Harun
- Yassin Yahya as Ustaz Abu
- Ruzaidi Abdul Rahman as Karim/Kimar
- Akmal Effendi Razak as Ismail
- Aman Graseka as Pailang
- Mak Jah as Mak
- A. Galak as Salim
- Pablo Amirul as Student 1
- Adnan Dzul as Student 2
- Ucop Cecupak as Bahri
- Ruzzlan Abdullah Shah as Lawyer Mr. Tnaka

== Sequel ==
The movie's sequel, Abang Long Fadil 2 was released in August 2017, which grossed higher than its first film, earning over RM17.9 million, making it the highest-grossing Malaysian film of 2017 and the tenth highest-grossing Malaysian film of all time, beating 2015 Astro Shaw's film Polis Evo. Syafiq returned to write and direct the sequel, in which Zizan reprising his role and Syamsul Yusuf portraying a completely different antihero role (opposed to his villain character Shark in previous KL Gangster installments and this film), with addition of new cast include Shuib Sepahtu, Achey Bocey and Tania Hudson. Yusof Haslam serves as the producer, with Najwa Abu Bakar from Astro Shaw acted as co-producer. A third eponymous sequel was released on 8 October 2022, becoming the highest grossing films of Abang Long Fadil trilogy.
