= List of Malaysian films =

This is an index for the list of films produced in Malaysia ordered by decade on separate pages. For an alphabetical listing of Malaysian films see Category:Malaysian films.

== Before 1960 ==
- List of Malaysian films before 1960

== 1960s ==
- List of Malaysian films of the 1960s

== 1970s ==
- List of Malaysian films of the 1970s

== 1980s ==
- List of Malaysian films of the 1980s

== 1990s ==
- List of Malaysian films of the 1990s

== 2000s ==
- List of Malaysian films of the 2000s
  - List of Malaysian films of 2000
  - List of Malaysian films of 2001
  - List of Malaysian films of 2002
  - List of Malaysian films of 2003
  - List of Malaysian films of 2004
  - List of Malaysian films of 2005
  - List of Malaysian films of 2006
  - List of Malaysian films of 2007
  - List of Malaysian films of 2008
  - List of Malaysian films of 2009

== 2010s ==
- List of Malaysian films of the 2010s
  - List of Malaysian films of 2010
  - List of Malaysian films of 2011
  - List of Malaysian films of 2012
  - List of Malaysian films of 2013
  - List of Malaysian films of 2014
  - List of Malaysian films of 2015
  - List of Malaysian films of 2016
  - List of Malaysian films of 2017
  - List of Malaysian films of 2018
  - List of Malaysian films of 2019

== 2020s ==
- List of Malaysian films of the 2020s
  - List of Malaysian films of 2020
  - List of Malaysian films of 2021
  - List of Malaysian films of 2022
  - List of Malaysian films of 2023
  - List of Malaysian films of 2024
  - List of Malaysian films of 2025
  - List of Malaysian films of 2026
  - List of Malaysian films of 2027
  - List of Malaysian films of 2028
  - List of Malaysian films of 2029

== See also ==
- Cinema of Malaysia
- List of highest-grossing films in Malaysia
