= List of Malaysian films of the 2000s =

This is a list of films produced in Malaysia ordered by year of release in the 2000s.

For an alphabetical listing of Malaysian films see Category:Malaysian films.

== 2000 ==
- List of Malaysian films of 2000

== 2001 ==
- List of Malaysian films of 2001

== 2002 ==
- List of Malaysian films of 2002

== 2003 ==
- List of Malaysian films of 2003

== 2004 ==
- List of Malaysian films of 2004

== 2005 ==
- List of Malaysian films of 2005

== 2006 ==
- List of Malaysian films of 2006

== 2007 ==
- List of Malaysian films of 2007

== 2008 ==
- List of Malaysian films of 2008

== 2009 ==
- List of Malaysian films of 2009
