= List of Malaysian films of the 2020s =

This is a list of films produced in Malaysia ordered by year of release in the 2020s.

For an alphabetical listing of Malaysian films see Category:Malaysian films.

== 2020 ==
- List of Malaysian films of 2020

== 2022 ==
- List of Malaysian films of 2022

== 2023 ==
- List of Malaysian films of 2023

== 2024 ==
- List of Malaysian films of 2024
