= List of Malaysian films of 2002 =

This is a list of Malaysian films produced and released in 2002. Most of the film are produced in the Malay language, but there also a significant number of films that are produced in English, Mandarin, Cantonese and Hokkien.

== 2002 ==
=== January – March ===
Opening		Title	Director	Cast	Genre	Notes	Ref.
J A N U A R Y	24	KL Menjerit	Badaruddin Azmi	Rosyam Nor, Nisdawati, Faizal Hussein, Danny X-Factor, Saiful Apek, Liza Hanim, Hasnul Rahmat, Rashidi Ishak, Rahim Razali, Vanida Imran, Sathiya, Kudsia Kahar, Khairil	Action / Romance	Tayangan Unggul	
F E B R U A R Y	21	Anak Mami The Movie	Abdul Razak Mohaideen	Farouk Hussin, Emylia Rosnaida, Fiza Elite, Shukor Mohaideen, Mas Naida, Zahida Rafik, Norlia Ghani, Cico Harahap, Piee, Ismail Din, Kartina Aziz, Maideen, Wan Maimunah, Eja, Lan Pet Pet, Shafi Khan, Nasir Ali	Comedy / Family	Grand Brilliance	
M A R C H	7	Idola	Aziz M. Osman	Norman Hakim, Normala Samsudin, Jeslina Hashim, Sharifah Aleya, Danny X-Factor, Sheila Mambo, Wahid Senario, M. Rajoli, Julie Dahlan, Nor Aliah Lee, Halim Othman, Tuty, Diana Danielle	Romance / Comedy	Tayangan Unggul	
M A R C H	28	Mendam Berahi	Z. Lokman	Nurul Jasmin Deo, Shaleen Cheah, Tracy Trinita, Rita Rudaini, Jalaluddin Hassan, Jaira Gomez, Eizlan Yusof, Zami Ismail, Yasin Sulaiman, Alu T. Gonzalez, Imuda, Mokhtaruddin, Hussein Abu Hassan, Mega Utami	Action / Romance	Metrowealth Movies Production	

=== April – June ===
Opening		Title	Director	Cast	Genre	Notes	Ref.
M A Y	23	Gerak Khas The Movie II	Yusof Haslam	AC Mizal, Abby Abadi, Juliana Banos, Azri Iskandar, Normala Samsudin, Jalaluddin Hassan, Ida Nerina, Faizal Hussein, Mazlan Pet Pet, Afdlin Shauki, Yusry KRU	Action / Crime	Skop Productions; Preceded by Gerak Khas The Movie (2001)	

=== July – September ===
Opening		Title	Director	Cast	Genre	Notes	Ref.
A U G U S T	1	Embun	Erma Fatima	Umie Aida, Hani Mohsin, Aqasha, Izi Yahya, Rahim Razali, Khatijah Tan, Ellie Suriaty, Ahmad Tarmimi Serigar, Mak Kwai Yuen, Riezman, Wan Shades, Loloq, Razak Ahmad, Ismail Din	Drama / Romance	Filem Negara Malaysia-FINAS co-production Entered into the 2002 Asia Pacific Film Festival	
A U G U S T	29	Mr. Cinderella	Ahmad Idham	Erra Fazira, Yusry KRU, Umie Aida, Aziz M. Osman, Helmi Gimmick, Opie Zami, Khatijah Ibrahim, M. Rajoli, Serina Redzuawan, Kudsia Kahar, A. R. Badul, Ropie Cecupak, Adik Tuty, Osman Kering, Yunni Nor Leitey	Comedy / Romance	Kuasatek Pictures-Skop Productions co-production	

=== October – December ===
Opening		Title	Director	Cast	Genre	Notes	Ref.
D E C E M B E R	6	Mami Jarum	Abdul Razak Mohaideen	Kartina Aziz, Vanida Imran, Zahida Rafiq, Rita Rudaini, Sheila Mambo, Ezad Exists, Piee, Maideen, Ismail Din, Norlia Ghani, Rosnah Mat Aris, Rashidi Ishak, Azizah Ali, Cico, Mahdi Jalut, Chik	Comedy / Family	Metrowealth Movies Production	
D E C E M B E R	6	Cinta 200 Ela	Shadan Hashim	Rashid Sidek, Wardina Safiyyah, Raja Azura, Man Bai, Sophia Ibrahim, Redzuan Hashim, Mahyon Ismail, Zaibo, Rambo Chin, Ramasundram	Drama / Romance	JAS Production; Adapted from the novel of the same name by Raja Azmi	
D E C E M B E R	20	Soalnya Siapa?	Othman Hafsham	Erra Fazira, Afdlin Shauki, Zaibo, Piee, Khatijah Tan, Ellie Suriaty, Rashid Salleh, Wan Maimunah, Sharifah Shahira, Linda Onn, Jaafar Onn, Aziz Sattar, Yusni Jaafar	Comedy / Romance	Serangkai Filem; Preceded by Soal Hati (2000); Entered into the 2003 Asia Pacific Film Festival	

=== Unreleased ===
Title	Director	Cast	Genre	Notes	Ref.
Room to Let	James Lee	Berg Lee, Loh Bok Lai, Bernard Chauly, Len Siew Mee, Kiew Suet Kim, Andrew Low, Ling Tan, Chong Sheon Wei, Koh Choon Eiow, Gan Hui Yee, Tay Chin Fie, Loh Kok Mun, Goh You Ping, David Ngui	Drama	Doghouse73 Pictures; Mandarin-language film Entered into the 2003 Deauville Asian Film Festival, 2003 Hong Kong International Film Festival, 2004 Bangkok International Film Festival, 2003 Singapore International Film Festival, 2003 Asian American International Film Festival, 2003 Cinemaya Asian Film Festival, 2003 Makati Cinemanila, 2003 Asian Film Symposium, 2004 Barcelona Film Festival	

== See also ==
- 2002 in Malaysia
