= List of Malaysian films of 2000 =

This is a list of Malaysian films produced and released in 2000. Most of the film are produced in the Malay language.

== 2000 ==
=== January – March ===
| Opening | | Title | Director | Cast | Genre | Notes | Ref. |
|---|---|---|---|---|---|---|---|
| J A N U A R Y | 8 | Pasrah | Yusof Haslam | Erra Fazira, Norman Hakim, Wilma Muhammad, Abby Abadi, Mazlan Senario, AC Mizal, Khairil Anwar, Rosnah Johari, Latiff Ibrahim, Kartina Aziz, A. Galak, Radhi Khalid, Farid Amirul, Sharifah Shahora | Drama / Romance | Grand Brilliance-Skop Productions co-production | |

=== April – June ===
| Opening | | Title | Director | Cast | Genre | Notes | Ref. |
|---|---|---|---|---|---|---|---|
| A P R I L | 6 | Mimpi Moon | Shuhaimi Baba | Rashidi Ishak, Kavita Sidhu, Jalaluddin Hassan, Ning Baizura, Afdlin Shauki, Asha Gill, Anuar Kamaruddin, Shamsul Cairel, Iskandar Najmudin, Erna Elliyana, Mohd Haikaldin, Ida Nerina, Sarimah Ibrahim, Jit Murad, Melissa Saila, Saiful Apek, Naa Murad, Joanna Bessey, Kamal Kadir, Adriani Wahjanto, Kher Cheng Guan, Ross Hadi | Comedy / Romance | Pesona Pictures-Grand Brilliance-Orbit United co-production Entered into the 2000 Asia Pacific Film Festival | |
| M A Y | 25 | Senario Lagi | Aziz M. Osman | Azlee Jaafar, Mazlan Ahmad, Wahid Mohamad, Saiful Apek, Yassin Yahaya, Syanie Hisham, Umie Aida, Al-Fariz Ismail, Siti Nora 'Bobbi', Ahmad Idham, Amy Mastura, Azhar Sulaiman, Aziz M. Osman, Effa Ismail, Jalaluddin Hassan, Lydiawati, Mustapha Kamal, Nina Juren, Nor Aliah Lee, Pansha, Zulkifli Zain, Said Prono, Abd Rahman Abdullah, Zaidi Rock, Khairul Rizal Ramli | Adventure / Comedy | Paradigm Film-Grand Brilliance co-production Preceded by Senario The Movie (1999); Entered into the 2000 Asia Pacific Film Festival, 2001 Fukuoka International Film Festival | |
| J U N E | 29 | Anaknya Sazali (Sazali's Son) | Jack Ad'Din | Ahmad Idham, M. Rajoli, Azean Irdawaty, Noraini Morat, Jasmin Hamid, Badrul Muhayat, Hafiz Asyaraf, Ahmad B, Bibi Yem, Kartina Aziz, Ismail Din, Jalaluddin Hassan, Natasha Nasir, Rosnah Johari, Fadilah Mansor, Normala Omar, Fadhil Dani, Rashidah Jaafar, Lan Zailan, Sheila Mambo, Nisdawati Nazaruddin, Dilla Ahmad | Comedy / Family | Eurofine; Preceded by Anakku Sazali (1956); Entered into the 2000 Asia Pacific Film Festival | |

=== July – September ===
| Opening | | Title | Director | Cast | Genre | Notes | Ref. |
|---|---|---|---|---|---|---|---|
| A U G U S T | 31 | Leftenan Adnan | Aziz M. Osman | Hairie Othman, Umie Aida, Farid Amirul, Faizal Hussein, Rusdi Ramli, Shaharuddin Thamby, Wahid Senario, M. Osman, Sherie Merlis, Rambo Chin, TS Jeffry, Johan Abdullah, Zul Yahya, Omar Nasrulhaq, Mohd Sany Royan, Mohd Razak Omar, Suhaimi Sulong, Ghazali Ismail, M. Zaidi Mohd Zain, M. Zam Azhari Zainudin, M. Khalid Ismail, Wan Shakri Wan Ee, Kamaruzaman Ariffin | Action / Historical | Paradigm Film-Grand Brilliance co-production Entered into the 2000 Asia Pacific Film Festival, 2001 Fukuoka International Film Festival | |
| S E P T E M B E R | 28 | Soal Hati | Othman Hafsham | Erra Fazira, Afdlin Shauki, Zaibo, Piee, Khatijah Tan, Chef Wan, Shamsul Ghau Ghau, Sathiya, Khairul Azhar, Ali Mamak, Sharmaine Arnaiz, Noor Azizah, Rubiah Suparman, Othman Hafsham, Anuar Zain, Linda Onn, Najihah Azlisham, Osman Kering, Albert Yeo Hock Gim, Azrol Nizam Razlan, Carmen Thien, Emillia Azyyati Abd Rahman, George Teoh, Harlym Yeo Hock Lim, Hashim Othman, Kanjana Dewi, Mohd Yusuf Ahmad, Mohd Ridzuan Mohd Anuar, Shaleen Cheah Beow Lin, Vicky Wong Meow Yin, Yoga, Zulkifly Jaya, Ismail Saman | Comedy / Romance | Serangkai Holdings | |

=== October – December ===
| Opening | | Title | Director | Cast | Genre | Notes | Ref. |
|---|---|---|---|---|---|---|---|
| D E C E M B E R | 27 | Syukur 21 | Eddie Pak | Nazrey Raihan, Che Amran Raihan, Abu Bakar Raihan, Zairi Raihan, Yassin Brothers, Norzizi Zulkifli, Eisya, Mustapha Kamal, Man Bai, Umi Kalthum, Mahyon Ismail, Yang Kassim, Ellie Suriaty, Mazlan Ahmad, Dharma Harun, Rohimi Sobeng, Ismadi Wakiri, Rika Yulianty | Drama / Science fiction | Metrowealth Movies Production; First Malaysian film using Sony Dynamic Digital Sound | |

=== Unreleased ===
| Title | Director | Cast | Genre | Notes | Ref. |
|---|---|---|---|---|---|
| Bukak Api | Osman Ali | Kak Ina, Manja, Mislina, Andy Danisha, Sophia, Anna | Drama | Pink Triangle Malaysia; Entered into the 2000 Red Ribbon Media Awards, 2001 Singapore International Film Festival, 2002 Cairo International Film Festival, 2002 Nantes International Film Festival | |
| Lips to Lips | Amir Muhammad | James Lee, Anitha Abdul Hamid, Huzir Sulaiman, Daniel Khong, Manesh Nesaratnam, Kubhaer T. Jethwani, Patrick Teoh, Joanna Bessey, Ahmad Ramzani Ramli, Ako Mustapha, Ary Malik, Ernie Chen, Chae Lian Diong, Farah Ashikin, Hani Khausar, Alina Morais, Carol Morais, Iskandar Najmudin, Soraya Sunitra Kee Xiang Yin, Kee Thuan Chye, Kher Cheng Guan, Jo Kukathas, Catherine Leong, Megat Muhammad Nizam, Nell Ng, R. Nathan, See Tshiung Han, Sue Tan, Mark Teh, Chacko Vadaketh, Yaacob | Drama / Comedy | Frogge Media Works Production-Artsee.net-Kino-I Studios-Cipta Films co-production Entered into the 2000 Hawaii International Film Festival, 2001 Singapore International Film Festival; First Malaysian film using digital video | |

== See also ==
- 2000 in Malaysia
