= MX3 =

MX3 or MX-3 may refer to:

- Mazda MX-3, a car by Mazda
- Meizu MX3, a smartphone released in 2013
- MX3, a food supplement brand in the Philippines owned by DMI Medical Supply Co., Inc.
  - Pilipinas MX3 Kings, its defunct Philippine basketball team
- MX3 class in the Motocross World Championship
- List of Malaysian films of 2003
