= List of Malaysian films of 2004 =

This is a list of Malaysian films produced and released in 2004. Most of the film are produced in the Malay language, but there also a significant number of films that are produced in English, Mandarin, Cantonese, Hokkien and Tamil.

== 2004 ==
=== January – March ===
Opening		Title	Director	Cast	Genre	Notes	Ref.
J A N U A R Y	2	Trauma	Aziz M. Osman	Amy Mastura, Nasha Aziz, Azhar Sulaiman, Sharifah Aleya, Seelan Paul	Thriller	Tayangan Unggul; Entered into the 2004 Asia Pacific Film Festival	
J A N U A R Y	29	Kuliah Cinta	Abdul Razak Mohaideen	Erra Fazira, Yusry KRU, Zahnita Hussein, Saiful Apek, Zahida Rafik, Yassin, Mohamad Faizal Hanafi (Ajai), Farid Kamil, Azza Elite, Cico Rashid, Azman Ahmad	Comedy / Romance	Metrowealth Movies Production	
F E B R U A R Y	26	Bisikan Remaja	Zulkeflie M. Osman, Din Glamour	Nisdawati, Zed Zaidi, Hasnul Rahmat, Nasrizal Ngasri, A. R. Badul, M. Rajoli, Baharuddin Omar, Rosnah Johari, Kamarool Yusof, Rosyam Nor, Pansha, Aziz M. Osman, Princess	Comedy / Romance	Berjaya Film Production	
M A R C H	11	Buli	Afdlin Shauki	Afdlin Shauki, Nasha Aziz, Hans Isaac, Sharifah Shahira, Hattan, Ako Mustapha, Patrick Teoh, Kartina Aziz, AC Mizal, Jeslina Hashim, Jalil Hamid, Erma Fatima, Harun Salim Bachik, Rashid Salleh, Riezman Khuzaimie, Din Beramboi, Ifa Raziah, Soraya Dean, Jason Lo, Joanna Bessey, Awie, Na’a Murad	Comedy / Romance	Grand Brilliance	
M A R C H	25	Bintang Hati	Aziz M. Osman	Amy Mastura, Anuar Zain, Fasha Sandha, Jaafar Onn, Umie Aida, M. Rajoli, Rosnah Mat Aris, Spider, Saiful Apek, Erma Fatima	Comedy / Romance	Tayangan Unggul	

=== April – June ===
Opening		Title	Director	Cast	Genre	Notes	Ref.
A P R I L	8	Di Ambang Misteri	Silver Chung	Zamarul Hisham, Elaine Daly, Raja Azery, Tony Yusop, Pekin Ibrahim, Kuswadinata, Melissa Saila, Whymen Young, Wan Suhaimi, Hussein Abu Hassan, Nabila Huda	Thriller / Mystery	Cosmos Discovery	
A P R I L	29	Gila-Gila Pengantin Remaja	Aziz M. Osman	Zahnita Hussein, Aszerul Beego (Phyne Ballerz), Rozaidi Abdul Jamil, Afdlin Shauki, Juliana Banos, Saiful Apek, A. R. Badul, Sheila Mambo	Comedy	Skop Productions-Ace Motion Pictures co-production Preceded by Gila-Gila Pengantin (2003)	
M A Y	20	Pontianak Harum Sundal Malam	Shuhaimi Baba	Maya Karin, Azri Iskandar, Rosyam Nor, Eizlan Yusof, Kavita Sidhu, Sahronizam, Nanu Baharuddin, Ida Nerina, Sharifah Aleya, Haiza, Yusmal, Adam Hamid, Nadia Mustafa, Aziz Sattar, Shah Reza, Azwan Ali, Sofia Ibrahim, Wahid Satay, Aimi Jarr	Drama / Horror	Jugra Publications-Pesona Pictures co-production Entered into the 2004 Estepona International Film Festival of Fantasy and Terror, 2004 Asia Pacific Film Festival	
J U N E	3	Bicara Hati	Rosnani Jamil	Fazura, Nick Mikhail, Tengku Shahirah, Zamarul Hisham, Jalaluddin Hassan, Norlida Ahmad, Shaharudin Thamby, Azween Aziz, Saiful Izham Iskandar, Eddie Halim Success, Suraya Aziz, Rosnani Jamil, Mustapha Maarof, Rozaidi Jamil, Hanis Halim, Too Cloze	Drama / Romance	RJ Production; Adapted from the novel Pelangi Pagi by Khadijah Hashim	
J U N E	24	Berlari Ke Langit	Badaruddin Azmi	Rosyam Nor, Fasha Sandha, Hasnul Rahmat, Danial Hazly, Siti Elizad, Saiful Apek, Md. Said Abdul Ghani, Lia Fidzriana, Adman Salleh, Fauziah Nawi, Wong Sip Nen	Drama / Romance	Tayangan Unggul; Entered into the 2004 Asia Pacific Film Festival	

=== July – September ===
Opening		Title	Director	Cast	Genre	Notes	Ref.
J U L Y	22	Hingga Hujung Nyawa	Abdul Razak Mohaideen	Erra Fazira, Yusry KRU, Khatijah Tan, Abu Bakar Omar, Ismail Din, Serina Redzuawan, Piee, Maidin, Zahida Rafik, Norlia Ghani, Vanida Imran, Rashidi Ishak, Farid Kamil	Drama / Romance	Metrowealth Movies Production	
A U G U S T	5	Makar	Silver Chung	AC Mizal, Soraya Dean, Rashidi Ishak, Jason Chong, Azza Elite, Rita Rudaini, Vanida Imran, Tomok	Drama / Thriller	Suria Records-Cosmos Discovery co-production	
A U G U S T	19	Aku No. 1	Aznil Nawawi	Aznil Nawawi, Azwan Ali, Jeslina Hashim, Jaafar Onn, Munir (Phyne Ballerz), Rosnah Mat Aris	Comedy	Boommax-A&A Pictures	
A U G U S T	31	Puteri Gunung Ledang	Saw Teong Hin	Tiara Jacquelina, M. Nasir, Rahim Razali, Adlin Aman Ramli, Sofia Jane, Khir Rahman, Sabri Yunus, Man Bai, Radhi Khalid, Zulkifli Zain, Mahadi Shor, Khairul Anwar, Ruminah Sidek, Christine Hakim, Slamet Rahardjo, Alex Komang, Dian Sastrowardoyo, Melissa Saila	Drama / Romance	EnfiniTi Productions; Entered into the 2005 Bangkok International Film Festival, 2004 Venice International Film Festival, 2004 San Francisco International Film Festival	
S E P T E M B E R	9	Buai Laju-Laju	U-Wei Saari	Eman Manan, Betty Banafe, Khalid Salleh, Liza Zain, Hasnul Rahmat, Baharuddin Omar, Adlin Aman Ramli, Anwar Idris, Amran Tompel, Firdauz Azami	Drama	LeBrocquy Fraser Productions; Adapted from the novel The Postman Always Rings Twice by James M. Cain; Entered into the 2004 Singapore International Film Festival, 2005 Rotterdam International Film Festival	
S E P T E M B E R	23	Cinta Luar Biasa	Rashid Sibir	Nasha Aziz, Saiful Apek, Hans Isaac, Syanie, Ako Mustapha, Erma Fatima, Fauziah Nawi, Husin Jojo, Norlia Ghani, Jasmin Hamid, Umie Aida, Aqasha, Wan Maimunah, Rosnah Mat Aris	Comedy / Romance	Tayangan Unggul	

=== October – December ===
Opening		Title	Director	Cast	Genre	Notes	Ref.
N O V E M B E R	14	Tujuh Perhentian	Abdul Razak Mohaideen	Erra Fazira, Farid Kamil, Vanida Imran, Maya Karin, Waheeda, Rashidi Ishak, Serina Redzuawan, Hattan, A. Shukor Mohaideen	Horror / Romance	Metrowealth Movies Production-Grand Brilliance-MIG Beats co-production	
N O V E M B E R	14	I Know What You Did Last Raya	Abdul Razak Mohaideen	Azlee, Mazlan, Waheeda, Zamarul Hisham, Ebby Yus, Erra Fazira, Pie, Khatijah Tan, Aznah Hamid, Mak Jah, Dynaz	Comedy / Mystery	Grand Brilliance co-production	
D E C E M B E R	2	SH3	Zek Zukry	Ashraf Sinclair, Fasha Sandha, Nasreen Ngasri, Opie Zami, Fara Fauzana, Fezrul Khan, Adrea Abdullah, Pushpa Narayan, Pa'din, Ridzuan Hashim, Norlida Ahmad, Rosnah Johari, Louisa Chong, Yazid Sobrani, Kumin, Saiful Izham Iskandar, Ruffedge, V.E	Comedy	AD-Niaga	
D E C E M B E R	16	Biar Betul	Aziz M. Osman	Afdlin Shauki, Syanie, Wahid Senario, Saiful Apek, Yassin, Accapan, Linda Onn	Comedy / Crime	Gitu-Gitu Productions-Nizarman co-production Adapted from the film Snatch (2000)	
D E C E M B E R	23	Tangkai Jering	Abdul Razak Mohaideen	Yassin Yahya, Elly Mazlein, Piee, Khatijah Tan, Ahmad Idham, Rina Khan, Azlee, Aznah Hamid, Serina Redzuawan, Farid Kamil, Ezad Exists, Shah Kassim, Zahan	Comedy	Metrowealth Movies Production-Grand Brilliance co-production	
D E C E M B E R	23	Ah Lok Kafe	Anwardi Jamil	Leonard Tan, Shawn Lee, Cheryl Lee, Ida Nerina, Masnaida Samsudin, Saiful Izham Iskandar, Nell Ng, Sue Tan, Linga Rajan, Man Bai, Reshmonu, Low Ngai Yuen, Othman Hafsham, Soo Kui Jien, Louisa Chong, Kee Thuan Chye, Pushpa Narayan, Harmandar Singh, Kenny Tay, Anwardi Jamil, Reggie Lee	Comedy	Ah Lok Production-N. Finity Production Picture co-production English-language film	

=== Unreleased ===
Title	Director	Cast	Genre	Notes	Ref.
Min	Ho Yuhang	Kok Mae Ling, Inom Yon, Ahmad Hashim	Drama	Ten On Ten Pictures; 2003 Three Continents Festival, 2004 Makati Cinemanila, 2003 Singapore International Festival Film, 2003 Cinemaya Festival of Asian Films, 2003 Torino Film Festival, 2004 Brugge Cinema Novo Film Festival	
The Beautiful Washing Machine	James Lee	Loh Bok Lai, Patrick Teoh, Amy Len, Berg Lee, Yap Kok Chong (Zun Yap), Chin Lee Ling	Drama	Doghouse73 Pictures; Mandarin- and Cantonese-language film Entered into the 2005 Bangkok International Film Festival, 2004 Singapore International Film Festival, 2004 Hong Kong International Film Festival, 2004 Munich Film Festival, 2004 Makati Cinemanila International Film Festival, 2004 Asian American International Film Festival, 2004 Osian Cinefan Asian Film Festival, 2004 Montreal World Film Festival, 2004 Tailly High Film Festival, 2004 Pusan International Film Festival, 2005 Rotterdam International Film Festival	
Tokyo Magic Hour	Amir Muhammad	Eijat, Fahmi Fadzil, Namron, Saifullizan Tahir	Drama / Experimental	Doghouse73 Pictures; Entered into the 2005 Rotterdam International Film Festival, 2005 Hong Kong International Film Festival, 2005 Singapore International Film Festival, 2005 San Francisco International Film Festival	
Visits: Hungry Ghost Anthology	Low Ngai Yuen (1413), James Lee (Waiting for Them), Ng Tian Hann (Nodding Scoop), Ho Yuhang	1413; Lim Ying Ling, Ian Yeoh, Carmen Soo, Wu Hon Kit, Lavender Chong, Candy Cheah, Lor Yew Mien, Oh Sok Peng Waiting for Them; Len Siew Mee, Yap Kok Chong, Tang Hui Ching, Tay Chin Fie, Steven Lim, Oh Sok Peng, Loh Bok Lai Nodding Scoop; Wong Sze Zen, Wisusanna Tioe, Ong Kok Liang, Chin Lee Ling, Chua Soo Hoon, Teng Whye Lyon, Chua Ching Pei, Chong Kong Fung, Koh Bee Yong, Leong Mun Kit, Thean Soo Gek, Ngiam Tu Wah, Aw Chun Fook, Chan Hsiao Syun, Foo Fatt Wai, Hoo Khai Meng, Deepak Kumaran Menon Anybody Home; Jackie Lim, Adlin Aman Ramlie, Pete Teo, James Lee, Alan Tan, Yasmin Ahmad, Chris Chun, Chew Kwan Mei, Ho Yuhang, Chin Kah Yan	Horror	Red Films Production; 2005 Rotterdam International Film Festival; Mandarin-language film	

== See also ==
- 2004 in Malaysia
