= List of Malaysian films of 2001 =

This is a list of Malaysian films produced and released in 2001. Most of the film are produced in the Malay language, but there also a significant number of films that are produced in English, Mandarin, Cantonese and Hokkien.

== 2001 ==
=== January – March ===
| Opening | | Title | Director | Cast | Genre | Notes | Ref. |
|---|---|---|---|---|---|---|---|
| M A R C H | 1 | Gerak Khas The Movie | Yusof Haslam | AC Mizal, Abby Abadi, Erra Fazira, Normala Samsudin, Rosyam Nor, Norman Hakim, Nasha Aziz, Mazlan Pet Pet, Yusof Haslam, Shaharon Anuar, A. Galak, Farid Amirul, Din Maidin, Zul Yahya | Action / Crime | Skop Productions | |

=== April – June ===
| Opening | | Title | Director | Cast | Genre | Notes | Ref. |
|---|---|---|---|---|---|---|---|
| M A Y | 24 | Seri Dewi Malam | Aziz M. Osman | Hairie Othman, Jeslina Hashim, Maya Karin, Khatijah Tan, Rashidi Ishak, Danny X-Factor, Ahmad Tarmimi Serigar, Hamidah Wahab, Redzuan Hashim, Arash, Nurul Jasmin Deo, Sharifah Shahora, M. Osman, Shukery Hashim, Aziz M. Osman, Rosli Mahmod | Mystery / Romance | Paradigm Film-Grand Brilliance co-production | |
| J U N E | 28 | Sara | Along Kamaruddin | Ida Nerina, Shamsul Ghau Ghau, Zahim Albakri, Hisham Ahmad Tajudin, Zami Ismail, Piee, Soosan Ho, Eja, Loloq, Ropi (Cecupak) | Comedy / Romance | Astro Shaw-Tayangan Unggul co-production | |

=== July – September ===
| Opening | | Title | Director | Cast | Genre | Notes | Ref. |
|---|---|---|---|---|---|---|---|
| J U L Y | 19 | No Problem | Z. Lokman | Opie Zami, Danny X-Factor, Maya Karin, Zami Ismail, Rosnah Mat Aris, Shamsul Ghau Ghau, Abon, Zila Bakarin, Zul Yahya, Yasin Sulaiman, Ann Ishar, Elly Hayanti, Azmi Din | Comedy / Romance | Metrowealth Movies Production | |
| A U G U S T | 2 | Dari Jemapoh ke Manchestee (From Jemapoh to Manchestee) | Hishamuddin Rais | Acui Zul Karnian, Indra Syahril, Arista Akma, Fariza Azlina, Amran Nasaruddin, Syed Bakar Syed Salim, Razak Khaliq, Maimon Abdul Muttalib, Bohari Ibrahim, Kassim Selamat (The Swallows), Anas Ruzki, Karim Afuan, Kamil Othman, Dollah Seman, Sabrina Ibrahim, Kuman, Alwi Malik, Shahbudin Kassim, Syed Ismail Syed Ali, Kinah Hassan, Yuswan Yusoff, Maznah Che' Zan, Datu Fachruddin Dawila, Wan Azli Wan Jusoh, Hell Angel Chapter Pasoh, Hell Angel Chapter Naga Mas, Hell Angel Chapter Cheras, Hell Angel Chapter Petaseh, Hell Angel Chapter K. Klawang, Hell Angel Chapter Paragon, Rebel Force 2, Kumpulan Carburetor Dung | Comedy / Adventure | Pitcairns Film-Paya Dara Production-Halim Sabir Production co-production Entered into the 1998 Singapore International Film Festival, 1999 Jakarta International Film Festival, 1998 Stockholm International Film Festival, 1998 Munchen Filmuseum, 1999 Berlinbeta International Film Festival, 1999 Rotterdam International Film Festival, 1999 Splitski Filmski Festival | |
| A U G U S T | 30 | Getaran | Nagaraj | Awie, Fiza Elite, Faizal Hussein, Aida Rahim, Opie Zami, Nurul Jasmin Deo, Arash, Rashidah Jaafar, Bob Lokman, Kristal, XPDC | Romance / Musical | SV Production | |
| S E P T E M B E R | 6 | Putih | Rashid Sibir | Erra Fazira, M. Nasir, Raja Azura, Wan Maimunah, Noraini Hashim, Mustapha Maarof, Jalaluddin Hassan, Zulkifli Zain, Abon | Family / Animation | Fine Animation | |
| S E P T E M B E R | 13 | Cheritera | Edwin Argh | Ahmad Tarmimi Serigar, M. Rajoli, Vanida Imran, Azmil Mustapha, Rosnani Jamil, Hafiz Asyaraf, Ebby Yus, Isma Aliff, Harun Salim Bachik, Noor Nikman Dadameah | Animation / Children | Red Rocket Animation-Matahari Animation & Production co-production Second animated film produced in Malaysia | |
| S E P T E M B E R | 27 | Cinta Tiada Restu | Azman Mohd Yusof | Salehuddin Hasan, Surni Salasan, Abu Bakar Omar, Kartina Aziz, Jasmin Hamid, Yusof Chong, Aneesa, Opie Zami | Musical / Romance | Dreamwalk | |

=== October – December ===
| Opening | | Title | Director | Cast | Genre | Notes | Ref. |
|---|---|---|---|---|---|---|---|
| O C T O B E R | 18 | Spinning Gasing | Teck Tan | Ellie Suriaty, Craig Fong, Corinne Adri, Edwin R. Sumun, Sanjeet Jarnail, Hani Mohsin, Rosyam Nor, Frankie Lee, Jalaluddin Hassan | Drama / Romance | Spinning Gasing Films-Niche Film co-production English-, Malay- and Cantonese-language film Entered into the 2000 Hawaii International Film Festival, 2001 Cinemaya Festival of Asian Films, 2001 Singapore International Film Festival | |
| O C T O B E R | 25 | Kaki Bakar (The Arsonist) | U-Wei Saari | Khalid Salleh, Nasrizal Ngasri, Kuswadinata, Anwar Idris, Azizah Mahzan, Jamaluddin Kadir, Kamarool Yusof, Ochee, Liza Rafar, Azmi Suhaimi (Tam), JD Khalid | Drama | Gambar Tanah Licin-Satu Gitu co-production Entered into the 1995 Brussels International Independent Film Festival, 1997 South-East Asian Biennial Film Festival, 1999 Jakarta International Film Festival, 1995 Cannes Film Festival, 1995 Sundance Channel Film Festival, 1996 New Directors/New Films Festival, 1996 Hawaii International Film Festival, 1996 Pusan International Film Festival, 1996 Fukuoka International Film Festival; Adapted from the short story Barn Burning by William Faulkner | |
| N O V E M B E R | 1 | The Deadly Disciple | S. Mohan | Vishal Kotian, Christina Hoh, Sanjay Singh, Jessie Lim, Jacinta Lee, Farouk Hussein, Dalip Singh, Serbegeth Singh, Jins Shamsuddin, Kuswadinata | Action / Comedy / Fantasy | Dynacoral Productions | |
| D E C E M B E R | 14 | Lagi Lagi Senario | Aziz M. Osman | Azlee Senario, Mazlan Senario, Saiful Apek, Wahid Senario, Yassin Senario, Wardina Safiyyah, Ani Maiyuni, Accapan, Robert Kong, Osman Kering, Syanie, Erma Fatima, Aziz M. Osman, Nasir Ali, Prono, William Atkinson | Comedy | Paradigm Film-Grand Brilliance co-production Preceded by Senario The Movie (1999) and Senario Lagi (2000) | |

=== Unreleased ===
| Title | Director | Cast | Genre | Notes | Ref. |
|---|---|---|---|---|---|
| Ah Beng Returns | James Lee | Loh Bok Lai, Amy Len Siew Mee, Lee Swee Keong, Ee Chee Wei, Tan Eng Heng, Lee Yoke Mun, Kiew Suet Kim, Gan Hui Yee, James Lee, Ng Aik Soon | Drama | Doghouse73 Pictures; Cantonese-, Hokkien- and Mandarin-language film Entered into the 2002 Singapore International Film Festival, 2002 Overseas Chinese Film Festival, 2002 Cork Film Festival | |
| Snipers | James Lee | Tan Eng Heng, Phang Khee Teik, Huzir Sulaiman, Sue Anne Gooi, Merissa Teh, Paul Lau | Drama / Action | Doghouse 73 Pictures-Artsee.net co-production English- and Cantonese-language film Entered into the 2002 Singapore International Film Festival, 2002 Cinemanila | |

== See also ==
- 2001 in Malaysia
