= List of Malaysian films of 2005 =

This is a list of Malaysian films produced and released in 2005. Most of the film are produced in the Malay language, but there also a significant number of films that are produced in English, Mandarin, Cantonese, Hokkien and Tamil.

== 2005 ==
=== January – March ===
Opening		Title	Director	Cast	Genre	Notes	Ref.
J A N U A R Y	13	Gangster	Badaruddin Azmi	Rosyam Nor, Umie Aida, Hasnul Rahmat, Ako Mustapha, Pushpa Narayan, Nurul Hana, Siti Elizad, Aqasha, Saiful Apek, Adlin Aman Ramli, Zack Taipan	Action / Crime	Tayangan Unggul	
J A N U A R Y	13	Chemman Chaalai (The Gravel Road)	Deepak Kumaran Menon	Saratha Sivalingam, Gandhi Nathan, Kalyani, Shangkara, Santhia Marathamuthu, Tharoni Mottian, Dhaarshini Sankran, Dinesh Ganesan, Karthikeyan, Saran, Maniam Periannan, Bala Sundram, Yap Ah Lan, Singaram Mookkan, Ramashvary Achiah, Zainal, Lim Yoong Chun, Foo Suet Mun, L. Marathamuthu, Vijaya Letchumy, Sujenthiran, Sharon Lee, Khairul Hakimin, Ramesh	Drama	Onehundredeye; Tamil-language film Entered into the 2005 Rotterdam International Film Festival, 2005 San Francisco International Film Festival, 2005 Barcelona Asian Film Festival, 2005 Osian's Cinefan Asian Film Festival, 2005 Asian Film Symposium, 2005 Fukuoka International Film Festival, 2005 Pusan International Film Festival	
J A N U A R Y	27	Tak Ori Tapi OK	A. R. Badul	Nasha Aziz, A. R. Badul, Musly Amir, S. Azli, Rahim Dalmia, Amran Tompel, Tamrin Ibrahim, Saiful Apek, Yusni Jaafar, Latiff Ibrahim, Jalil Hamid, Rosnah Johari, Ahmad Tarmimi Serigar, Herman Tino, Zulkifli Ismail, Nagaraj, Yazid Sobrani, Ropie Cecupak, Osman Kering, Pie, Rama	Comedy	Nusan Bakti Corporation	
F E B R U A R Y	9	GK3 The Movie	Yusof Haslam	Abby Abadi, Sarimah Ibrahim, Norman Hakim, Faizal Hussein, Julia Hana, Misha Omar, Aqasha, Ezany, Saiful Apek, Corrie Lim, Zack Kool, Andy Kuanda, A. Galak, Farid Amirul, Din Maidin, Yusof Haslam, Elly Mazlein, Zambri, Zulkifli Ismail	Action / Crime	Lotus Five Star AV-Skop Productions co-production Preceded by Gerak Khas The Movie (2001) and Gerak Khas The Movie II (2002)	
F E B R U A R Y	24	Sepet	Yasmin Ahmad	Sharifah Amani, Ng Choo Seong, Harith Iskander, Ida Nerina, Adibah Noor, Tan Mei Ling, Thor Kah Hoong, Linus Chung, Alan Yun Kam Lun	Drama / Romance	MHz Film; Malay-, English-, Cantonese- and Mandarin-language film Entered into the 2005 Creteil International Women's Film Festival, 2005 San Francisco International Film Festival	
M A R C H	10	Potret Mistik	Abdul Razak Mohaideen	Cico Harahap, Lintang Asih, Khai, Winnie Kok, Erra Fazira, Khir Rahman, Zamarul Hisham, Khatijah Tan, Intan Jusmiera, Aminah Ahmad, Farid Kamil, Serina Redzuawan, Aznah Hamid, Ismail Din, Seelan Paul, Normala Omar, Pierre Andre	Mystery / Thriller	Metrowealth Movies Production- Grand Brilliance co-production	
M A R C H	24	Sembilu 2005	Yusof Haslam	Vince Chong, Hetty Sarlene, Zed Zaidi, Ziana Zain, Khai, Juliana Banos, Pushpa Narayan, Erra Fazira, Angeline Tan, Awie, Buzen Hashim, Diana Johor, Norsyiela, Salleh Yaakob, Aznah Hamid, Aziz Singah, Abby Abadi, Azza Elite, Johan Abdullah, Ernie Sharlina, Shahira, Vaneesa Chong	Drama / Romance	Lotus Five Star AV-Skop Productions co-production Preceded by Sembilu (1994) and Sembilu II (1995)	

=== April – June ===
Opening		Title	Director	Cast	Genre	Notes	Ref.
M A Y	5	Kemarau Cinta	Meor Hashim Manap	Nasha Aziz, Eman Manan, Syaiful Ahmad Dolbar (Pool), Noralbaniah, Aziz Singah, Azean Irdawaty, Hisham Ahmad Tajuddin, Piee, Hamid Gurkha, Kamarool Yusof, Osman Kering, Hamdan, Illya, Cecupak	Drama / Romance	Nusan Bakti Corporation	
M A Y	12	Aandal	Sandosh Kesavan	Nandhini, R. Jeyaraman (THR Ram), Shangkara, Yegavalli, Shanmuganathan Manoramalingam	Drama	Tamil-language film	
M A Y	19	Senario XX	Aziz M. Osman	Wahid, Saiful Apek, Fazura, Mazlan, Azlee, Wahid Satay, Lazizah Ahmad, Rosyam Nor, Yassin Yahya, Chef Wan, Siti Fazurina	Comedy / Science fiction	Grand Brilliance; Preceded by Senario The Movie (1999) Senario Lagi (2000), Lagi-Lagi Senario (2001), Lang Buana (2003)	
J U N E	2	Lady Boss	Abdul Razak Mohaideen	Ning Baizura, Saiful Apek, Erra Fazira, Yusry KRU, Farid Kamil, Ismail Din, Khatijah Tan, M. Rajoli, Zamarul Hisham, Zulkifli Zain, Normala Omar, Piee, Aziz M. Osman, Hafidzuddin Fazil, Nasir Ali, Aleeza Kassim, Nurul Azura, Shah Kassim, Pierre Andre	Comedy / Romance	Metrowealth Movie Production Gitu-Gitu Production co-production	
J U N E	16	Pontianak Menjerit	Yusof Kelana	Ziana Zain, Juliana Banos, Azlee Jaafar, Faizal Hussein, Mazlan Pet Pet, Zad Zaidi, Sheila Rusly, Zarina Zainoordin, Amran Tompel, Nursyella, Osman Kering, Corrie Lee, Julia Hana, Jalaluddin Hassan, Angeline Tan, Zambri	Horror / Comedy	ME Communications-Skop Productions co-production Malay- and Thai-language film	
J U N E	30	Qaisy & Laila	Raja Ahmad Alauddin	Jehan Miskin, Fazura, Umie Aida, Radhi Khalid, Redzuan Hashim, Rahimah Rahim, Fahrin Ahmad, Tengku Nurtasha, Farok Khan	Drama / Romance	Nizarman-Serangkai Filem co-production Malay-, English- and Pashtu-language film	

=== July – September ===
Opening		Title	Director	Cast	Genre	Notes	Ref.
A U G U S T	11	Gol & Gincu	Bernard Chauly	Fazura, Ashraf Sinclair, Sazzy Falak, Pierre Andre, Rafidah Abdullah, Sharifah Amani, Melissa Maureen Rizal, Kartini Kamalul Ariffin, Celina Khor, Zarina Zainoordin, Noor Anita Mohd Tahir, Farrah Shamilla, Anding, Zahim Albakri, Ida Nerina, Bernice Chauly, Khatijah Tan, Yasmin Yusuff	Comedy / Romance	Red Films	
A U G U S T	25	Gila-Gila Pengantin Popular	Aziz M. Osman	Erra Fazira, Afdlin Shauki, Saiful Apek, Norman Hakim, Linda Nanuwil, Nora Danish, Afida Es, Sarip Nor, Haris Aben Fadhillah, Aziz M. Osman, Erma Fatima, Yusof Haslam	Comedy	Skop Productions-Ace Motion Pictures co-production	
S E P T E M B E R	8	KL Menjerit 1	Badaruddin Azmi	Rosyam Nor, Erra Fazira, Que Haidar, Sheera Iskandar, Saiful Apek, Zul Huzaimy, Danny X-Factor, Md. Said Abdul Ghani, Beggo	Action / Drama	Tayangan Unggul; First Malaysian film using prequel story line Prequel to KL Menjerit (2002)	

=== October – December ===
Opening		Title	Director	Cast	Genre	Notes	Ref.
N O V E M B E R	3	Anak Mami Kembali	Abdul Razak Mohaideen	Saiful Apek, Fasha Sandha, Azean Irdawaty, Waheeda, Farid Kamil, Piee, Ismail Din, Sheila Mambo, Zulkifli Zain, Normala Omar, Irma Hasmie, Nasir Ali, Abdul Shukor Mohaideen, Raudhah Che Wan, Rozita Che Wan	Comedy / Family	Metrowealth Movies Production-MIG Beats-Gitu-Gitu Productions-co-production	
N O V E M B E R	3	Salon	Woo Ming Jin	Raja Farah Raja Aziz, Pierre Andre, Shah Kassim, Nasrizal Ngasri, Chelsia Ng, Jojo Struys, Zach Ubu, Syanie, Khatijah Tan, Ho Yuhang, Lily Chinniah, Kin Wah, Kisma Johar, Abu Bakar, Kevin, Naeim, Hariri, Azahari, Jaja, Zydeck Siew, Fahmi Fazil, Visvash, Avon, Andreas, Yin, Arif, Fauzi, Keith, Baby Stephanie, Saifullizan Tahir, Shatish, Baizura Kahar	Romance / Comedy	Alternate Studio-Monsoon Pictures-Grand Brilliance co-production Malay- and English-language film	
N O V E M B E R	24	Pontianak Harum Sundal Malam II	Shuhaimi Baba	Maya Karin, Rusdi Ramli, Ida Nerina, Rosyam Nor, Kavita Sidhu, Nanu Baharuddin, Zahim Albakri, Zaibo, Haiza, Shahronizam, Aziz Sattar, Pierre Andre, S. Shamsuddin, Rosnani Jamil, Mariani	Drama / Horror	Pesona Pictures; Preceded by Pontianak Harum Sundal Malam (2004)	
D E C E M B E R	8	Rock	Mamat Khalid	Hasnul Rahmat, Que Haidar, Khir Rahman, Norazmi Bahron, Sofi Jikan, Siti Elizad, S. Amin Shahab, Norlida Ahmad, Julie Dahlan, Kamarool Yusof, Jaafar Onn, Sapri Ibrahim, Nabila Huda, Hani Hermi, Farah Man Kidal, Sarimah Mohd Daud, Loloq, Amy Search, Man Kidal Lefthanded, Nasir Jani, Hamid Gurkha, Rashidi Ishak, Hanifah Zainuddin, Shafiee Othman, Azmi Black Wings, Rosminah Sidek, Isrizal Mohd Isa, Mohd Herwan Sairon, Azhar Md Tasi, Mohd Hishamsul Yahya	Comedy / Musical	Grand Brilliance	
D E C E M B E R	22	Baik Punya Cilok	Afdlin Shauki	Afdlin Shauki, Awie, Hans Isaac, AC Mizal, Harun Salim Bachik, Patrick Teoh, Carmen Soo, Harith Iskander, Ida Nerina, Riezman Khuzaimi, Nadia Mustaffa, Din Beramboi	Action / Comedy	Tayangan Unggul	
D E C E M B E R	31	Uyir (The Soul)	Premnath Pillai	Logithavani, Geethanjali Kaushalya, Manimaran, Rajeshwaran, Mahesan, Marilyn John, Ghandhiben, Murugan, Prakash, Sasitharan Rajoo, Sasitharan, Gayathiri, Sivagami @ Sintha, Ageavalli, Bobby, Kasturi	Horror	Ambi Agency; Tamil-language film	

=== Unreleased ===
Title	Director	Cast	Genre	Notes	Ref.
Cinta Fotokopi	Abdul Razak Mohaideen	Zarina Zainoordin, Khai, Farid Kamil, Irma Hasmie, Cico Harahap, Pierre Andre, M. Rajoli, Khatijah Tan, Dynaz, Bob, Adam, Noorainie Saadiah, Yasotha Sooriyamurthi, Normala Omar, Zulkifli Zain, Hafidzuddin Fazil	Comedy / Romance	Metrowealth Movies Production	
Monday Morning Glory	Woo Ming Jin	Patrick Teoh, Azman Hassan, Hariry Ismail, Zaifrul Nordin	Drama	Greenlight Pictures; 2005 San Francisco International Film Festival	
Sanctuary	Ho Yuhang	Loh Bok Lai, Chua Thien See, Chin Leong Fatt, Pete Teo	Drama	Doghouse73 Pictures; Mandarin-language film Entered into the 2004 Pusan International Film Festival, 2005 Rotterdam International Film Festival, 2005 Fribourg International Film Festival, 2005 Singapore International Film Festival	
The Legend Of The Red Curse	Bjarne Wong	Sanny Lu, Smyth Wong, Dominic Morris, Renai Raelene Mattu, Kelvin Toh, Martin Tutit	Thriller / Horror	Wong Brothers Film-Hock Star Entertainment Industry co-production English-, Mandarin-, Malay- and Iban-language film	

== See also ==
- 2005 in Malaysia
