= List of Malaysian films of 2009 =

This is a list of Malaysian films produced and released in 2009. Most of the film are produced in the Malay language, but there also a significant number of films that are produced in English, Mandarin, Cantonese, Hokkien and Tamil.

== 2009 ==
=== January – March ===
Opening		Title	Director	Cast	Genre	Notes	Ref.
J A N U A R Y	15	Maut	Badaruddin Azmi	Que Haidar, Liyana Jasmay, Sabrina Hassan, Eja, Hasnul Rahmat, Raja Farah, Noreminadiya, Diana Danielle, Mohamad Bathich, Danny X-Factor, Hafidzuddin Fazil, Zack Taipan, Fouziah Ghous, Sherry Ibrahim, Awal Ashaari, Hamidah Wahab, Ajeeb Sani Tyson, Fauziah Nawi, Ridzuan Hashim	Thriller / Drama	Tayangan Unggul	
J A N U A R Y	29	Sifu & Tongga	Abdul Razak Mohaideen	Saiful Apek, Ahmad Nabil Ahmad, Fouziah Ghous, Erra Fazira, Azad Jasmin, Rozita Che Wan	Adventure / Comedy	Grand Brilliance	
F E B R U A R Y	12	Geng: The Adventure Begins	Mongehd Nizn Bermulabdul Razak	Kannan Rajan, Nur Fathiah Diaz, Kee Yong Pin	Adventure / Animation		
F E B R U A R Y	26	Rasukan Ablasa	Abdul Razak Mohaideen	Fouziah Ghous, Gambit Saifullah, Almy Nadia, Mohd Hafiz	Thriller	Grand Brilliance, Lineclear Motion Pictures	
M A R C H	12	Jin Hutan	Jeffery Wong	Jeffery Wong, Zami Ismail, Opie Zami, Indah Han, Zalina	Horror / Thriller	Mandarin-language film	
M A R C H	12	Sayang	Bjarne Wong	Sharifah Amani, Dafi, Samuel Rizal, Ebi Kornelis, Carmen Soo	Romance / Dance / Teen		
M A R C H	26	Talentime	Yasmin Ahmad	Mahesh Jugal Kishor, Pamela Chong, Jaclyn Victor, Syafie Naswip, Mislina Mustaffa, Azean Irdawaty, Adibah Noor	Comedy / Drama / Romance	Grand Brilliance	

=== April – June ===
Opening		Title	Director	Cast	Genre	Notes	Ref.
A P R I L	9	Jangan Tegur	Pierre Andre	Julia Ziegler, Pierre Andre, Nadia Mustafa, Almy Nadia, Ellie Suriati, Rozita Che Wan	Horror	Metrowealth	
A P R I L	18	Malaysian Gods	Amir Muhammad		Documentary		
A P R I L	23	Bohsia: Jangan Pilih Jalan Hitam	Syamsul Yusof	Syamsul Yusof, Shaheizy Sam, Nabila Huda, Salina Saibi, Diana Danielle, Aaron Aziz	Action / Drama	Skop Productions	
M A Y	7	Sell Out!	Yeo Joon Han	Jerrica Lai, Peter Davis, Hannah Lo, Kee Thuan Chye	Comedy / Musical	Astro Shaw; Multi-language film	
M A Y	21	Karaoke	Chris Chong Chan Fui	Zahiril Adzim, Mislina Mustaffa, Nadiya Nissa, Amerul Affendi	Drama	Screened at the 2009 Cannes Film Festival (Directors' Fortnight section)	
M A Y	21	Syurga Cinta	Ahmad Idham	Awal Ashaari, Heliza Helmi, Haziq	Drama / Romance	MIG Pictures	
M A Y	23	JOMLAH C.I.U.M	M. Subash Abdullah	M. Subash Abdullah, Kenchana Devi, Wahiduzzaman, Pathieswaran	Drama / Patriotism		
J U N E	4	Jangan Pandang Belakang Congkak	Ahmad Idham	Shaheizy Sam, Lan Pet Pet, Cat Farish, Lisa Surihani, Piee	Horror / Comedy		

=== July – September ===
Opening		Title	Director	Cast	Genre	Notes	Ref.
J U L Y	16	Skrip 7707	Abdul Razak Mohaideen	Fasha Sandha, Fouziah Ghous, Que Haidar, Almy Nadia, Pekin Ibrahim	Horror mystery	Grand Brilliance, Lineclear Motion Pictures	
J U L Y	30	Setem	Kabir Bhatia	Rashidi Ishak, Afdlin Shauki, Indi Nadarajah, Vanida Imran, Que Haidar, Bront Palarae, Harun Salim Bachik	Comedy / Action	Tayangan Unggul	
S E P T E M B E R	12	Woman on Fire Looks for Water	Woo Ming Jin	Ernest Chong, Chung Kok-keong, Foo Fei Ling, Jerrica Lai	Drama	Co-production with South Korea	
S E P T E M B E R	20	Jin Notti	Azhari Mohd Zain	Mawi, Fara Fauzana, Cat Farish, Bob Lokman, Ahmad Nabil Ahmad	Comedy / Fantasy	KRU Studios	
S E P T E M B E R	20	Momok the Movie	M. Jamil	Faizal Ramli, Abon, Ahmad Nabil Ahmad, Aziz Sattar	Horror comedy		

=== October – December ===
Opening		Title	Director	Cast	Genre	Notes	Ref.
O C T O B E R	8	Papadom	Afdlin Shauki	Afdlin Shauki, Liyana Jasmay, Vanida Imran, Norkhiriah, Harun Salim Bachik, Farid Kamil, Scha Alyahya	Comedy / Drama / Family	Tayangan Unggul	
O C T O B E R	22	Lembing Awang Pulang Ke Dayang	Majed Salleh	Farid Kamil, Siti Elizad, Zul Huzaimy, Lynette Ludi, Kuswadinata, Hattan	Drama / Romance / Historical		
N O V E M B E R	5	Pisau Cukur	Bernard Chauly	Maya Karin, Fazura, Aaron Aziz, Eizlan Yusof, Redza Minhat, Nabila Huda, Umie Aida, Nabil Ahmad	Comedy / Romance		
N O V E M B E R	19	Senario The Movie Episode 2: Beach Boys	Ahmad Idham	Azlee Jaafar, Lan Pet Pet, Wahid Mohamed, Maria Farida, Riezman Khuzaimi, Nik Sayyidah, Marsha Milan Londoh, Jamali Shadat	Adventure / Comedy	MIG Production; Preceded by Senario The Movie (1999) Senario Lagi (2000), Lagi-Lagi Senario (2001), Lang Buana (2003) Senario XX (2005) Senario Pemburu Emas Yamashita (2006), Senario The Movie: Episod 1 (2008)	
N O V E M B E R	26	Jalang	Nazir Jamaluddin	Yasmin Khaniff, Hairie Othman, Kuswadinata, Maria Farida, Yang Kassim, Ridzuan Hashim, Faizal Hussein	Drama		
D E C E M B E R	3	My Spy	Afdlin Shauki	Maria Farida, AC Mizal, Afdlin Shauki, Harun Salim Bachik, Carmen Soo, Adlin Aman Ramlie, Ridzuan Hashim	Comedy		
D E C E M B E R	10	Santau	Azhari Mohd Zain	Esma Daniel, Puteri Mardiana, Riezman Khuzaimi, Bob Lokman, Zul Handy Black	Thriller / Horror	MIG Productions	
D E C E M B E R	17	Pulau Asmara	Uttam Kumar Thangiah	Sheikh Bolkhiah, Abby Azis, Faizal Ramly, Latif Ibrahim, Aziz Singah, Shasha Arsheela	Romance		
D E C E M B E R	24	Muallaf	Yasmin Ahmad	Sharifah Amani, Ning Baizura, Sharifah Alesya, Yeo Yann Yann, Brian Yap, Rahim Razali	Drama	Malay-English-Mandarin-language Film	
D E C E M B E R	31	Duhai Si Pari-Pari	Azmi Mohd Hata	Harun Salim Bachik, Liyana Jasmay, Que Haidar, Remy Ishak, Aziz Sattar, Farid Kamil, Nabila Huda, Hans Isaac, Zizan Razak	Comedy / Fantasy		

== See also ==
- 2009 in Malaysia
