= List of Malaysian films of 2010 =

This is a list of Malaysian films produced and released in 2010. Most of the film are produced in the Malay language, but there also a significant number of films that are produced in English, Mandarin, Cantonese, Hokkien and Tamil.

== 2010 ==
=== January – March ===
Opening		Title	Director	Cast	Genre	Notes	Ref.
J A N U A R Y	14	Adnan Sempit	Ahmad Idham	Shaheizy Sam, Intan Ladyana, Yana Samsudin, Cat Farish, Julia Hana, Along Raja Lawak	Comedy / Drama	MIG Production	
J A N U A R Y	28	2 Hati 1 Jiwa	Abdul Razak Mohaideen	Fouziah Ghous, Yasmin Hani, Fahrin Ahmad, Ziela Jalil, Mustapha Kamal	Comedy / Family / Drama	Grand Brilliance Lineclear Motion Pictures	
F E B R U A R Y	11	Lu Pikirlah Sendiri De Movie	Aminah Rhapor	Ahmad Nabil Ahmad, Puteri Sarah Liyana, Mila, Meet Uncle Hussain, Vanida Imran, Zizan Razak	Comedy		
F E B R U A R Y	25	Niyang Rapik	Ahmad Idham	Nasir Bilal Khan, Zed Zaidi, Liyana Jasmay, Fizz Fairuz, Shaheizy Sam, Awal Ashaari	Horror	Excellent Pictures	
M A R C H	11	V3: Samseng Jalanan	Farid Kamil	Farid Kamil, Bront Palarae, Aqasha, Lisa Surihani, Intan Ladyana	Action	MIG Production Preceded by Remp-It (2006)	
M A R C H	25	Evolusi KL Drift 2	Syamsul Yusof	Syamsul Yusof, Farid Kamil, Scha Alyahya, Shaheizy Sam, Aaron Aziz, Remy Ishak, Hetty Sarlene	Action	Skop Productions Grand Brilliance Preceded by Evolusi KL Drift (2008)	

=== April – June ===
Opening		Title	Director	Cast	Genre	Notes	Ref.
A P R I L	8	Semerah Cinta Stilleto	Ahmad Idham	Farid Kamil, Lisa Surihani, Cat Farish, Shaharuddin Thamby, Nanu Baharuddin, Jamali Shadat	Comedy / Romance	MIG Production	
A P R I L	22	Hooperz	Rosihan Zain	Melissa Maureen, Mustapha Kamal, Amy Mastura, Remy Ishak, Zazleen Zulkafli, Adibah Noor, Anita Baharom, Juliana Evans	Comedy / Sports	Grand Brilliance	
M A Y	6	Belukar	Jason Chong	Bront Palarae, Daphne Iking, Chew Kin Wah, Danny X-Factor, Ahmad Tarmimi Siregar, Along Eyzendy	Action / Drama / Romance		
M A Y	20	Andartu Terlampau 21 Hari Mencari Suami	Din CJ	Haliza Misbun, Fahrin Ahmad, Awie, Erra Fazira, Jalaluddin Hassan, Farah Fauzana, Maimon Mutalib	Comedy / Romance		
J U N E	3	Lagenda Budak Setan	Sharad Sharan	Farid Kamil, Lisa Surihani, Fazura, Que Haidar, Raja Farah	Drama / Romance	Adapted from the novel of the same name authored by Ahadiat Akashah	
J U N E	3	Kecoh Betul	S. Baldev Singh, Ikhzal Azfarel Ideris	Saiful Apek, Ahmad Nabil Ahmad, Diana Danielle, Bell Ngasri, Shah R., Haryati Hamzah, Vanessa Chong, Aziz Sattar, Sheila Mambo, Fauziah Nawi	Action / Comedy	White Mepart Entertainment	
J U N E	17	Kapoww!!	Azizi Chunk	Lisa Surihani, Afdlin Shauki, Bell Ngasri, Zizan Razak, Awie, Harun Salim Bachik	Action / Comedy / Superhero	Tayangan Unggul	

=== July – September ===
Opening		Title	Director	Cast	Genre	Notes	Ref.
J U L Y	1	Zoo	Azhari Mohd Zain	Mazlan Pet Pet, Lisa Surihani, Bob Lokman, Azlee Jaafar	Action / Comedy	MIG Production	
J U L Y	15	Mantra	Azhari Mohd Zain	Mas Muharni, Zul Handy Black, Hasnul Rahmat, Hamdan Ramli, Ana Dahlia	Horror / Mystery / Suspense	Metrowealth Pictures	
S E P T E M B E R	9	Senario Asam Garam	Hatta Azad Khan	Azlee Jaafar, Mazlan Pet Pet, Zaibo, Julia Hana, Fimie Don, Nadia Mustafar, Syanie	Comedy / Romance / Family	Metrowealth Pictures; Preceded by Senario The Movie (1999) Senario Lagi (2000), Lagi-Lagi Senario (2001), Lang Buana (2003) Senario XX (2005) Senario Pemburu Emas Yamashita (2006), Senario The Movie: Episod 1 (2008) Senario The Movie Episod 2: Beach Boys (2009)	
S E P T E M B E R	9	4 Madu	Abdul Razak Mohaideen	Saiful Apek, Rozita Che Wan, Fasha Sandha, Rosnah Mat Aris, Allana Amir, Marsha Milan Londoh, Rahim Razali, Sazzy Falak, Latif Ibrahim, Bienda	Comedy / Romance	Grand Brilliance	
S E P T E M B E R	23	Magika	Edry Abdul Halim	Mawi, Diana Danielle, Fimie Don, Ziana Zain, Maya Karin, Sharifah Amani, Sharifah Aleya, Ning Baizura, M. Nasir, Vanida Imran, Nabil Ahmad, Aznil Nawawi	Adventure / Musical / Fantasy	KRU Studios	

=== October – December ===
Opening		Title	Director	Cast	Genre	Notes	Ref.
O C T O B E R	7	Jangan Pandang Belakang Congkak 2	Ahmad Idham	Mazlan Pet Pet, Azlee Jaafar, Cat Farish, Lisa Surihani, Nora Danish, Bob Kuman	Comedy / Horror	Metrowealth Pictures Preceded by Jangan Pandang Belakang Congkak (2009)	
O C T O B E R	21	Cuti-Cuti Cinta	Ahmad Idham	Farid Kamil, Nora Danish, Cat Farish, Zaibo, Azizah Mahzan, Kazar Saisi, Zed Zaidi	Comedy / Romance	Metrowealth Pictures	
N O V E M B E R	4	Estet	Mamat Khalid	Farid Kamil, Gandhi Nathan, Rosyam Nor, Sofi Jikan, Jasmine Michael, Mislina Mustaffa, David Arumugam	Comedy / Drama / Romance / Musical	Naga VXS	
N O V E M B E R	11	Crayon	Dean A. Burhanuddin	Hon Kahoe, Faisal Abdullah, Adibah Noor, Joshry Adamme	Family / Dance / Independent	English-, Mandarin-, Tamil-language film	
N O V E M B E R	18	2 Alam	Ed Zarith, Hairie Othman	Aaron Aziz, Suhaillah Salam, Faizal Hussein, Kuswadinata, Adrea Abdullah	Drama / Horror		
N O V E M B E R	25	Ngangkung	Ismail Bob Hasim	Shaheizy Sam, Eira Syazira, Azad Jasmin, Angah Raja Lawak, Puteri Mardiana, Azlee Jaafar, Mazlan Pet Pet	Comedy / Horror	Metrowealth Pictures	
D E C E M B E R	2	Aku Tak Bodoh	Boris Boo	Amy Mastura, Nam Ron, Wan Noor Aizzat, Suhairil Sunari, Aizat Hassan, Jalaluddin Hassan, Adibah Noor, Riezman Khuzaimi	Comedy / Family	Grand Brilliance	
D E C E M B E R	9	Hantu Kak Limah Balik Rumah	Mamat Khalid	Awie, Johan Raja Lawak, Delimawati, Ummi Nazeera, Avaa Vanja, Nadia Mustafar, Shy8, Zami Ismail, Man Kadir, Dewa, Sofi Jikan, Kamarul Yusoff, Zainuri Berita Harian, Azman, Pekin Ibrahim	Comedy / Horror / Mystery	Tayangan Unggul	
D E C E M B E R	16	Aku Masih Dara	Ahmad Idham	Raja Farah, Ashraf Muslim, Farid Kamil, Yana Samsudin, Dian P. Ramlee	Romance	Metrowealth Pictures	
D E C E M B E R	23	Janin	M. Hitler Zami	Eja, Hairie Othman, Kuswadinata, Rahim Razali, Sherie Merlis, Zami Ismail	Horror	Grand Brilliance	
D E C E M B E R	30	Damping Malam	Ahmad Idham	Ahmad Idham, Amy Mastura, Erynne Erynna, Azizah Mahzan, Eizlan Yusof, Putri Mardiana	Horror	Metrowealth Pictures	

== See also ==
- 2010 in Malaysia
