= Kisah Kaisara =

Malaysian drama TV series

- Genre: Teen drama, slice of life
- Created by: Aziz M. Osman
- Written by: Amor Rizan; Aben Othman; Nyon Othman; Irwan Idris; Yob Fadzil; Husni Othman
- Directed by: Nyon Othman
- Starring: Sari Yanti; Nabila Nasir; Farid Irwan Baharin; Elliza Razak; Wan Sharmila; Aeril Zafrel; Faralyna Idris; Faizul Hafiz
- Opening theme: "Jikalau Aku" by Ezlynn (Season 1); "A.E.I.O.U." by Elliza Razak ft. Ahli Fiqir (Seasons 2-3)
- Country of origin: Malaysia
- Original language: Malay
- No. of seasons: 3
- No. of episodes: 39

Production
- Executive producer: Nor Aliah Lee
- Producer: Aziz M. Osman
- Production location: Malaysia
- Editors: Faizal Bakhtar; Aben Othman
- Camera setup: Multi-camera setup
- Running time: 19–20 minutes
- Production company: Ace Motion Pictures

Original release
- Network: TV3; TV9
- Release: October 30, 2007 – September 23, 2009

Kisah Kaisara (transl. Kaisara's Story) is a 2007 Malaysian teen drama television series produced by Aziz M. Osman. The premise of the series focuses on teenage secondary school girl named Kaisara, whom studied at SMK Yaacob Latif, Kuala Lumpur. The series was premiered from October 30, 2007 and concluded on September 23, 2009 on TV3 and TV9 with a total of 3 seasons and 39 episodes.

During its initial television run, the series was rated among top 5 Malaysia's most-watched TV program in 2007 with 3.5 million viewers and has gained a huge following, especially amongst teenage girls. The series was sponsored by Kotex. A webisode based on the series was launched in July 2010 with 15 minutes per episode. It also available for online streaming on TV3's official YouTube channel.

== Cast ==
=== Main characters ===
- Sari Yanti as Kaisara (Seasons 1–3)
- Nabila Nasir as Yanie (Season 1)
- Wan Sharmila as Amy (Seasons 1–3)
- Elliza Razak as Dania (Seasons 1–3)
- Farid Irwan Baharin as Aben (Seasons 1–2)
- Aeril Zafrel as Andi (Season 1)
- Faizul Hafiz as Haris (Season 2-3)
- Faralyna Idris as Hana (Season 2-3)
- Reza Syafiq as Shahrin (Season 3)
- Ayu Shuhada as Julie (Season 3)

=== Supporting cast ===
- Norman Hakim as Hasnor
- Yasmin Haron as Marlia (replaced by Nor Aliah Lee for Season 2)
- Zarina Zainuddin as Teacher Jasmin
- Catriona Ross as Seri
- Finie Don as Janet
- Norisz Ali as Kak Tinaz
- Zoey Rahman as Azmeer
- Nadia Kesumawati as Teacher Ramlah
- Kismah Johar as Grandma

== Episodes ==
Season	Episodes	Originally released	
Season	Episodes	First released	Last released
1	13	October 30, 2007	January 22, 2008
2	13	August 29, 2008	November 4, 2008
3	13	July 1, 2009	September 23, 2009

=== Season 1 (2007–2008) ===
No. overall	No. in season	Title	Original release date
1	1	"Berbalas-Balas"	30 October 2007
2	2	"Kawan Baru"	6 November 2007
3	3	"Mama Oh Mama"	13 November 2007
4	4	"Cari Kawan Untuk Cari Gaduh"	20 November 2007
5	5	"Sahabat"	27 November 2007
6	6	"Rupa Atau Sikap"	4 December 2007
7	7	"Buat Hal"	11 December 2007
8	8	"Kena Main"	18 December 2007
9	9	"Rumah Itu Syurgaku"	25 December 2007
10	10	"Jangan Sombong"	1 January 2008
11	11	"Matchmaker"	8 January 2008
12	12	"Rahsia Terpendam (Part I)"	15 January 2008
13	13	"Rahsia Terpendam (Part II)"	22 January 2008

=== Season 2 (2008) ===
No. overall	No. in season	Title	Original release date
14	1	"Kisah Bermula"	29 July 2008
15	2	"Dilema"	5 August 2008
16	3	"Tak Sesuai"	12 August 2008
17	4	"Surat Berantai"	19 August 2008
18	5	"Sara Tak Kisah"	26 August 2008
19	6	"Eh... Siapa Nak Kahwin?"	2 September 2008
20	7	"Main Api"	9 September 2008
21	8	"Kenapa Hana"	16 September 2008
22	9	"Syok Sendiri"	23 September 2008
23	10	"Serkap Jarang"	14 October 2008
24	11	"Eii... Takutnya"	21 October 2008
25	12	"Nak Buat Lagu Mana?"	28 October 2008
26	13	"Hilang"	4 November 2008

=== Season 3 (2009) ===
Notes: Season 3 began airing on TV9.

No. overall	No. in season	Title	Original release date
27	1	"Perjanjian"	1 July 2009
28	2	"Sama Seperti Dahulu"	8 July 2009
29	3	"Ramalan"	15 July 2009
30	4	"Sunday Matinee"	22 July 2009
31	5	"Biar Betul"	29 July 2009
32	6	"Dalang"	5 August 2009
33	7	"Cuti-Cuti Malaysia"	12 August 2009
34	8	"Slumber Party"	19 August 2009
35	9	"Krisis"	26 August 2009
36	10	"Kesedaran"	2 September 2009
37	11	"Cabaran"	9 September 2009
38	12	"Kawan Makan Kawan"	16 September 2009
39	13	"Perpisahan"	23 September 2009

== Awards ==
- Gold Award for The Best Use of Sponsorhip category at the 2008 MSA Malaysia Media Awards
