= List of Malaysian films of 2003 =

This is a list of Malaysian films produced and released in 2003. Most of the film are produced in the Malay language, but there also a significant number of films that are produced in English, Mandarin, Cantonese, Hokkien and Tamil.

== 2003 ==
=== January – March ===
Opening		Title	Director	Cast	Genre	Notes	Ref.
J A N U A R Y	30	Gila-Gila Pengantin	Aziz M. Osman	Erra Fazira, Norman Hakim, Juliana Banos, Hairie Othman, Salleh Yaacob, Syanie Hisham, M. Rajoli, A. R. Badul, A. Galak, Aimi Jarr	Romance / Comedy	Skop Productions-Ace Motion Pictures co-production	
F E B R U A R Y	27	Iskandar	Nagaraj	Awie, Jeslina Hashim, Farouk Hussein, Bob Lokman, Jalaluddin Hassan, Radhi Khalid, Hetty Sarlene, Bob Khairul, Aleeza Kassim, Maideen, Accapan, Ameng Spring, Terry Gallyot, Hamidah Wahab, Buvanes	Action / Comedy	SV Productions	
M A R C H	29	Laila Isabella	Rashid Sibir	Rosyam Nor, Nasha Aziz, Saiful Apek, Syanie, Hans Isaac, Erma Fatima, Liza Hanim, Yusni Jaafar, Azean Irdawaty, Kudsia Kahar, Seelan Paul, Norsuehada Hamid, SM Salim	Comedy / Romance	Tayangan Unggul	

=== April – June ===
Opening		Title	Director	Cast	Genre	Notes	Ref.
A P R I L	24	Mistik	Abdul Razak Mohaideen	Cico Harahap, Nisdawati, Shaleen Cheah, Rita Rudaini, Masnaida, Al-Fathir Muchtar, Ezad Exists, Zahan, Farid, Catriona, Uji Rashid, Ismail Din	Horror / Thriller	Metrowealth Movies Production	
M A Y	29	Mami Jarum Junior	Abdul Razak Mohaideen	Rita Rudaini, Ezad Exists, Azza Elite, Ismail Din, Norlia Ghani, Piee, Maideen, Vanida Imran, Zahida Rafiq, Sheila Mambo, Rosnah Mat Aris, Rashidi Ishak	Comedy / Family	Metrowealth Movies Production; Preceded by Mami Jarum (2002)	
J U N E	26	Black Maria	Ambri Kailani Zain	Nisdawati, Eizlan Yusof, Azhar Sulaiman, Joe Radzwill, Julia Hana, Hamidah Wahab, Fasha Sandha, Hisham Ahmad Tajudin, Dian P. Ramlee, Zainurdin Ismail, Rose Iskandar, Mohd Razib, Zack Idris, Aida Aris, Zahida Rafik, Zizie Ezette	Drama / Action	Simfoni Makmur	

=== July – September ===
Opening		Title	Director	Cast	Genre	Notes	Ref.
J U L Y	10	Paloh	Adman Salleh	Janet Khoo, Namron, Gibran Agi, Ellie Suriaty, Hasnul Rahmat, Ani Maiyuni, Thor Kah Hong, Steve Ng Boon Cheng, A. Samad Salleh, Rohani Yusuff, Meoki Tong May Lan, Kamaliah Mat Dom, Adlin Aman Ramli, Lee Yoke Lan, Zack Taipan, Yalal Chin, M. Amin	Drama / Action	Filem Negara Malaysia-FINAS co-production Entered into the 2003 Asia Pacific Film Festival, 2004 Bangkok International Film Festival, 2004 Singapore International Film Festival	
J U L Y	24	Janji Diana	Yusof Haslam	Erra Fazira, Rosyam Nor, Sarimah Ibrahim, Faizal Hussein, Elly Mazlein, Fazley, Intan Sarafina, Helmi Gimmick, Zul Handy Black, Zack Kool, Lando, Marissa, Nurul, Rafiena Izani, Erma Fatima, Shukery Hashim, Dian P. Ramlee	Romance / Action	Skop Productions; Entered into the 2003 Asia Pacific Film Festival	
A U G U S T	28	Diari Romeo	Zulkeflie M. Osman	Achik Spin, Zack X-Factor, Sharifah Nadia, Fendi X-Factor, Masnaida, Sharifah Aleya, M. Rajoli, Sheila Mambo, Jalaluddin Hassan, Aida Rahim, Zami Ismail	Comedy	Tayangan Unggul	
S E P T E M B E R	4	Aku Kaya The Movie	Murali Abdullah	Yassin Yahya, Illya Buang, Hamdan Ramli, Jeslina Hashim, Rahim Razali, Munir (Phyne Ballerz), Ramasundram, Rosnah Mat Aris, Ahmad Busu, Zaibo, Amuk, X-Factor	Comedy	Boommax-A&A Pictures co-production First Malaysian film using high-definition technology digital camera	
S E P T E M B E R	25	Cinta Kolestrol	Abdul Razak Mohaideen	Erra Fazira, Yusry KRU, Hafidzuddin Fadzil, Abu Bakar Omar, Aleeza Kassim, Farid Kamil, Edrinaz (Dynaz), Liza Zain, Adik Asyhraf, Adik Fifi, Wan Khatijah, Azman, Abot, Kuman (Bob KU2), Neetylina Abu Bakar, Shahrun Nizam Suhaimi, Norhaslinda Abu Bakar, Zainab Bukhary, Rizal Othman, Abdul Razak Mohaideen	Comedy / Romance	Metrowealth Movies Production-Erra Fazira Entertainment-KRU Motion Pictures co-production	

=== October – December ===
Opening		Title	Director	Cast	Genre	Notes	Ref.
N O V E M B E R	25	Mr. Cinderella 2	Din CJ	Erra Fazira, Yusry KRU, Maya Karin, Anita Sarawak, Opie Zami, Rashid Salleh, M. Rajoli, Khatijah Ibrahim, Helmi Gimmick, Ismail Hutson, Umie Aida, Jalaluddin Hassan, Jamali Shadat, Mohd Nor Bon, Harun Salim Bachik	Drama / Romance	Kuasatek Pictures-Skop Productions co-production Preceded by Mr. Cinderella (2002)	
N O V E M B E R	25	MX3	Yusof Kelana	Saiful Apek, Faizal Hussein, Zul Yahya, Sarimah Ibrahim, Syanie, Juliana Banos, Sheila Rusly, Azlee Jaafar, Helmi Gimmick, Osman Kering, A. Galak, Farid Amirul, Rozaidi, M. Rajoli, Aimi Jarr, Erra Fazira, Rosyam Nor	Comedy / Action	ME Communications; Skop Productions co-production	
D E C E M B E R	4	Lang Buana	Mamat Khalid	Azlee Jaafar, Wahid, Mazlan Pet Pet, Saiful Apek, Kuswadinata, Shamsul Ghau Ghau, Tengku Sariwani (Kunie), Adza Tutyrianti, Tan Sue Len, Loloq, S. Amin Shahab, M. Rajoli, Hasnul Rahmat	Comedy / Action	Grand Brilliance; Preceded by Senario The Movie (1999), Senario Lagi (2000), Lagi-Lagi Senario (2001)	
D E C E M B E R	18	Jutawan Fakir	Abdul Razak Mohaideen	Saiful Apek, Waheeda, Kuman (KU2), Azza Elite, Piee, Imuda, Azlee Jaafar, Nasir Ali	Comedy	Metrowealth Movies Production	
D E C E M B E R	25	Gila Bola	Zulkiflee Md. Said	Fazley, Linda Onn, Opie Zami, Saiful Apek, Syanie, Cico Harahap, Julia Hana, Ako Mustapha, Accapan, Aziz M. Osman, Seelan Paul, Joe Jusophian, Ricky Rikarno, Jefri Fauzi, Tony Eusoff, Landslyde, Sulaiman Yassin	Comedy	Nizarman	

=== Unreleased ===
Title	Director	Cast	Genre	Notes	Ref.
First Take, Final Cut	Ng Tian Hann	Ong Kok Liang, Lavin Seow, Ee Chee Wei, Kiew Suet Kim, Gan Hui Yee, Ling Tan, Koh Choon Eiow, Goh You Peng	Drama / Comedy	Doghouse73 Pictures-The Bread Productions co-production Cantonese- and Mandarin-language film	
Gedebe	Namron	Zul Huzaimy Marzuki, Md Ezendy Aziz, Mohammad Hariry Abdul Jalil, Hairul Anuar Harun, Sofi Jikan, Azizi Mohd Said, Steven, Zaba, Rosli Mohd Talib, Bob, Toemoe, Hadi Tahir, Shahli	Drama	Cipta Films; Adaptation of William Shakespeare's play Julius Caesar	
Rabun (My Falling Eyesight)	Yasmin Ahmad	M. Rajoli, Kartina Aziz, Rozie Rashid, Irwan Iskandar, Norkhiriah, Nor Ibrahim, Ho Yuhang	Drama / Family	Grand Brilliance-MHz Film co-production 2003 Torino Film Festival, 2003 Singapore International Film Festival, 2003 Cinemaya Festival of Asian Films	
The Big Durian	Amir Muhammad	Bernice Chauly, Erna Mahyuni, Farish A. Noor, Ghafir Akbar, Anne James, Jo Kukathas, Low Ngai Yuen, Namron, Nell Ng, Michael Oo, Nigel Rajaretnam, Rashid Salleh, Salleh Ben Joned, Zedeck Siew, Sandra Sodhy, Soh Boon Tat, Patrick Teoh, Chacko Vadaketh, Shantini Venugopal, Elizabeth Wong, Zaifeena Wan Nasir, Amir Muhammad	Drama / Documentary	Doghouse73 Pictures; Malay-, English-, Cantonese-, Hokkien- and Tamil-language film Entered into the 2003 Yamagata International Documentary Film Festival, 2004 Vancouver International Film Festival, 2004 Sundance Film Festival, 2004 Bangkok International Film Festival, 2004 Jeonju International Film Festival, 2003 Singapore International Film Festival, 2003 Cinemaya Asian Film Festival, 2003 Makati Cinemanila, 2003 Hawaii International Film Festival, 2004 Commonwealth Film Festival	

== See also ==
- 2003 in Malaysia
