= List of Malaysian films of 2016 =

This is a list of Malaysian films produced and released in 2016. Most of these films are produced in the Malay language, but there also a significant number of them that are produced in English, Mandarin, Cantonese and Tamil.

== 2016 ==
=== January – March ===
Opening		Title	Director	Cast	Genre	Notes	Ref.
J A N U A R Y	7	Langit Cinta	Osman Ali	Fazura, Keith Foo, Farid Kamil, Siti Saleha, Jalaluddin Hassan, Fauziah Ahmad Daud	Drama / Family / Romance	Astro Shaw-Nuansa co-production	
J A N U A R Y	14	Mat Moto: Kami Mat Moto Bukan Mat Rempit	Pekin Ibrahim & Syafiq Yusof	Pekin Ibrahim, Felisha Grossley, Zul Huzaimy, Cat Farish, Syamsul Yusof, Shaheizy Sam, Faizal Hussein, Kamarol Yusoff	Drama / Romance	Skop Productions-Viper Studios co-production	
J A N U A R Y	21	Kastil Tua	Sabree Fadzil & Chiska Doppert	Samantha Katie, Ajun Perwira, Josiah Hogan, Kimberly Ryder, Alina Saraswati	Horror / Adventure / Drama / Historical / Mystery	Fimtab Unik-Capitol Entertainment co-production Films set at Kellie's Castle; Indonesian-language film	
J A N U A R Y	28	Ola Bola	Chiu Keng Guan	Chee Jun Cherng, Muhd Luqman Hafidz, Mohamad Taufiq, Saran Kumar, Marianne Tan, Katrina Ho, Bront Palarae, Frankie Lee	Drama / Sports	Astro Shaw-GSC-Multimedia Entertainment co-production Malay-, English-, Mandarin- and Tamil-language film	
F E B R U A R Y	4	Pelepas Saka	Hashim Rejab	Hanif Safuan, Hafiz Bahari, Lydia Izati, Esma Daniel, Fauzi Nawawi	Horror	Mangkin Prestij	
F E B R U A R Y	4	Special Forces	Michael Chuah	Frankie Lee, KK Wong, Michael Chuah, Brendan Yuen	Action / Comedy	Evo Pictures; Mandarin-language film	
F E B R U A R Y	4	Let's Eat	Chapman To	Chapman To, Aimee Chan, C-Kwan, Lo Hoi-pang	Comedy	Asia Tropical Films-Clover Films co-production Cantonese-language film Malaysia-Singapore co-production	
F E B R U A R Y	11	Huat The Fish	Silver Yee Teik Yin & Chieng Hein Onn	Jack Lim, Jeff Chin, Juztin Lan, Alvin Chong, Wan Wai Fun, Bernard Hiew, Gan Mei Yan	Comedy / Drama / Family	The Film Engine; Cantonese-language film	
F E B R U A R Y	18	Girl's Generation	Aniu, Teddy Chin & Zhao Yu	Owodog, JC Chee, Royi, Yumi Wong SK, Keqing, Emily Kong	Comedy / Musical	One Borneo Film Productions; Mandarin-language film	
F E B R U A R Y	25	Munafik	Syamsul Yusof	Syamsul Yusof, Nabila Huda, Sabrina Ali, Pekin Ibrahim, Fizz Fairuz	Horror	Skop Productions	
M A R C H	3	BoBoiBoy: The Movie	Nizam Razak	Nur Fathiah Diaz, Nur Sarah Alisya, Yap Ee Jean, Dzubir Mohamed Zakaria, Wong Wai Kay, Mohd Fathi Diaz, Azman Zulkiply, Mohd Hafiz Ashraf, Anas Abdul Aziz	Action / Animation	Animonsta Studios	
M A R C H	3	Ais Kosong	Manan Subra	Alvin Martin, Sasikumar, Anu Ramamoorthy, Sangabalan, Shamini Ramasamy, Kristina Vinokree, Nanthakumar, Pradeep Singh, Sivakumar	Adventure / Comedy	MS Digital Studio; Tamil-language film	
M A R C H	10	The Kid from the Big Apple	Jess Teong	Tommy Tam, Tan Qin Lin, Jason Tan	Drama / Family	Three Production; Mandarin-language film	
M A R C H	10	Usin UFO	Zul Yahya	Shuib Sepahtu, Puteri Sarah Liyana, Liza Abdullah, Aisyah Ilias	Comedy / Fantasy / Science fiction	Cahaya DJ Pictures	
M A R C H	10	It's The Moment Yang Arif	S. T. Bala	Ross Hassan, Suriana Abdul Wahab (Keena Mentor), Jacob Rabindranath, K. Balakumaran	Crime / Thriller	Fenomena Seni Produksi; English-, Malay- and Tamil-language film	
M A R C H	17	Kipidapp! Selamatkan Hari Jadi	Eyra Rahman	Rani Kulup, Atikah Suhaimie, Hafreez Adam, Aizat Hassan, Kartina Aziz	Comedy	MIG Pictures	
M A R C H	31	Warna Cinta Impian	N. S. Krishna	Erwin Dawson, Awie, Erra Fazira, Azlee Khairi, Nazeera Sardi, Fad Bocey, Shiqin Kamal	Romance	TouchTronics Entertainment	

=== April – June ===
Opening		Title	Director	Cast	Genre	Notes	Ref.
A P R I L	7	Showdown The Movie	Khairil M. Bahar	Reza Hasbi, Izara Aishah, Iedil Putra, Azad Jasmin, Maria Farida	Dance / Drama	Grand Brilliance-Lightbulb Pictures co-production	
A P R I L	14	Redha	Tunku Mona Riza	Namron, June Lojong, Harith Haziq, Izzy Reef, Nadiya Nisaa, Remy Ishak, Ruminah Sidek, Susan Lankester	Drama / Family	Current Pictures; Film about autism	
A P R I L	21	Lu Mafia Gua Gangster	Roy	Shafiq Razlan, Kumpulan Zero, Jalaluddin Hassan, Zack Taipan, Along Azendy, Saiful Apek, Zul Arifin, Zaibo, Syanie	Comedy / Action / Crime / Romance	Red Fires Film Production	
A P R I L	28	Perjanjian Syaitan	M. Subash Abdullah	Ahmad Tarmimi Siregar, Imuda, Mak Jah	Horror / Drama / Mystery	RK Vision-Yusari Film	
M A Y	5	Harmonika	Raja Mukhriz Raja Ahmad Kamaruddin	Elizad Sharifuddin, Ahya Rosli, Normah Damanhuri, Nurul Fateha, Aini Batrisya, Jonathan Putra, Riezman Khuzaimi, Taznisa J	Horror / Mystery	SPS Jaya	
M A Y	12	Judi-Judi King Boss	Julian Cheah	Julian Cheah, Gana, Zhi Qian, Syalmizi Hamid, Syarmila Rastam, Sean Ho, Al Chan, Peter Jackson, Franciscus Nithya, Murali Ramakrishnan, Clovis Chew, Narvinderjit Singh, Tasvinder Sandher, Kash Rhal, Angel Ong, Sugeindhiran Sagotharan, Jude Jasvin Joseph, Remy Ismail, Ismail Ishak, Wesley Yeoh	Comedy	Julian Cheah Pictures; English / Malay / Mandarin / Tamil / Hokkien / Punjabi-language film	
M A Y	19	Cendol: Kepada Allah Aku Berserah	M. Subash Abdullah	Ma’arof, Farwizah, Zack Idris	Drama	RK Vision-Yusari Film	
M A Y	19	My Stupid Boss	Upi Avianto	Reza Rahadian, Bunga Citra Lestari, Alex Abbad, Chew Kinwah, Bront Palarae, Atikah Suhaimie, Iskandar Zulkarnain	Comedy	Skop Production	
M A Y	26	Old Town Story	Lai Kim Koon	Alan Chung, Peter Chan, Andy Khor, Iky Loke, Brendan Yuen, Johannes Koo, Namewee, Chee Cheng Hoe	Drama / Family	Cao Min Pictures; Mandarin / Cantonese-language film	
J U N E	9	Mayangaathey	C. Kumaresan	C. Kumaresan / Shaila Nair	Comedy / Horror	TouchTronics Entertainment; Tamil-language film	

=== July – September ===
Opening		Title	Director	Cast	Genre	Notes	Ref.
J U L Y	6	Anak Mami Nasi Kandaq	Abdul Razak Mohaideen	Qi Razali, Fasha Sandha, Nur Risteena, Ezzaty Abdullah, Maria Farida, Azmir RL, Chik Pak Man Telo, Sheila Mambo	Comedy	FiTA Studios-UiTM co-production	
J U L Y	14	Zack Kapcai	Rosli Mohd Taib	Fad Bocey, Rahim Sepahtu, Shuk SYJ, Julia Marin	Comedy / Action	Metrowealth	
J U L Y	28	Dukun Doktor Dani	Sabri Yunus	Taufik Batisah, Fasha Sandha, Raysha Rizrose, Amerul Affendi, Khatijah Tan	Comedy / Drama	Astro Shaw	
A U G U S T	4	Kampung Drift	Nevin Hiong	Syafie Naswip, Pekin Ibrahim, Pablo Amirul, Fatin Afeefa Arian, Zalfa Zain, Chen Sin Foo, Puovin Sandera, Syazwan Yunos, Jazli Hassan	Action / Drama	Mico Studio-Empire Film Solution co-production	
A U G U S T	11	Temuan Takdir	Dhyan Vimal	Zahim Albakri, Ery Zukhairi, Azura Zainal, Vanida Imran, Amai Kamarudin, Thanuja Ananthan	Crime / Thriller	Zazen Production-Empire Film Solution co-production	
A U G U S T	18	Chinese Ghost Story	Wong Tak Fung	Jeff Chin, Bernard Hiew, Juztin Lan, Emely Poon	Comedy / Horror	Redribbon Experiences	
A U G U S T	18	Mawar Putih	Rosnani Jamil	Reen Rahim, Arja Lee, Triestan Aprilian, Cinta Dewi, Adli Eddynor	Drama / Romance	Manja Citra	
S E P T E M B E R	1	Pekak	Mohd Khairul Azri Md Noor	Zahiril Adzim, Sharifah Amani, Iedil Putra, Sharifah Sakinah, Amerul Affendi, Zaidi Omar	Drama	Grand Brilliance-Lightbulb Pictures co-production	
S E P T E M B E R	8	Radhi Rudy bin Dadu	Arjin Uppal	Sofi Jikan, Puteri Sarah, Taiyudin Bakar, Ezzaty Abdullah, Usop Wilcha, Khatijah Tan, Aziz Sattar, Adam Corrie	Action / Comedy	White Merpati Entertainment	
S E P T E M B E R	8	Aliff Dalam 7 Dimensi	Faisal Ishak	Juliana Evans, Izzue Islam, Alif Satar, Kaka Azraff	Action / Horror	Astro Shaw	
S E P T E M B E R	15	Muluk dan Konco	Abdul Razak Mohaideen	Azhari Zain, Saiful Apek, Yassin, Jalil Hamid, Sarah Hilderbrand	Comedy	FiTA Studios-UiTM co-production	
S E P T E M B E R	22	Volkswagen Kuning	Shadan Hashim	Pekin Ibrahim, Atikah Suhaimie	Horror	MIG Productions	
S E P T E M B E R	22	Geethaiyin Raadhi	Shalini Muthusamy	K. Karnan G Crak, Shalini Balasundaram, Vicran Elanggoven	Comedy	Vikadakavi	
S E P T E M B E R	29	Juvana 3: Perhitungan Terakhir	Faisal Ishak	Zahiril Adzim, Johan Asari, Adam Shahz, Hasnul Rahmat, Pekin Ibrahim	Action / Drama	Empire Film Solution; Preceded by Juvana (2013) and Juvana 2: Terperangkap Dalam Kebebasan (2015)	

=== October – December ===
Opening		Title	Director	Cast	Genre	Notes	Ref.
O C T O B E R	6	Mat Moto Otai	Ahmad Idham	Eizlan Yusof, Ahmad Idham, Opie Zami, Cat Farish	Comedy / Action	AIFA Motion Pictures	
O C T O B E R	13	Kecoh! Primadona Kena Hantu	Pierre Andre	Kamal Adli, Kamarul Yusoff, Khatijah Tan, Abam, Amir Raja Lawak	Horror / Comedy	Rainfilm	
O C T O B E R	27	Rock Bro!	Mamat Khalid	Khir Rahman, Hasnul Rahmat, Pekin Ibrahim, Kaka Azraff, Sofi Jikan, Azmi Black, Amy Juliet	Comedy / Drama	Primeworks Studios	
N O V E M B E R	24	Hanyut	U-Wei Haji Saari	Peter O'Brien, Reeuben Alvin, Diana Danielle, Sofia Jane, Ady Putra, Alex Komang	Period Drama	Gambar Tanah Licin	
N O V E M B E R	24	Upin & Ipin Jeng Jeng Jeng!	Ainon Ariff & Erma Fatima	Awie, Puteri Balqis, Remy Ishak, Sara Ali	Animation / Comedy	Les' Copaque-KRU Studios co-production	
D E C E M B E R	1	Interchange	Dain Iskandar Said	Iedil Putra, Shaheizy Sam, Nicholas Saputra, Prisia Nasution, Nadiya Nissa, Alvin Wong, Chew Kin Wah	Fantasy / Thriller	Apparat-Primeworks co-production	
D E C E M B E R	8	Desolasi	Syafiq Yusof	Syamsul Yusof, Bella Dally, Pekin Ibrahim, Jalaluddin Hassan	Science Fiction	Skop Productions	
D E C E M B E R	22	Bo-Peng	Helmi Yusof	Nabil Ahmad, Johan As'ari, Zulin Aziz, Fauzi Nawawi, Soffi Jikan	Comedy	Pencil Pictures and Records	
D E C E M B E R	22	Happy Birth Death	Don Hoe	Yana Samsudin, Jean Tan, Qian Kung, Yang BaoBei, Kean Chin	Horror	Full Billion Entertainment	
