= List of Malaysian films of 2024 =

This is a list of Malaysian films produced and released in 2024. Most of these films are produced in the Malay language, but there also a significant number of them that are produced in Tamil, English, and Mandarin.

== Malay Language Movie ==
| Opening | Title | Studio | Director | Cast | Genre | Ref. |
|---|---|---|---|---|---|---|
| 4 Jan | Anak Perjanjian Syaitan 2 | Grand Brilliance Studio, Primeworks Studios | Dr. Ahmad Idham | Eyka Farhana, Alif Satar, Fasha Sandha, Azizah Mahzan, Azlan Komeng, Dian P. Ramlee | Horror | |
| 11 Jan | Pendekar Awang: Darah Indera Gajah | Studio Kembara | Shaharuddin Dali, Saiful Reza Shukor | Fattah Amin, Namron, Fazura, Nadhir Nasar, Amir Ahnaf, Wan Hanafi Su, Tissa Biani, Amerul Affendi | Action, Epic | |
| 18 Jan | Jiwa 8 Belas | Sri Saheb Production | Baldev Singh | Sophia Albarakbah, Shah Hazvee, Izuan Razali, A. Galak, Kanda Khairul, Faha Azhar, Dato Jalaluddin Hassan, Ikhram Juhari, Akim Nordin, Fauziah Nawi dan ramai lagi. | Action | |
| 8 Feb | Rain Town | Current Pictures | Tunku Mona Riza | Kin Wah Chew, Susan Lankester, Fabian Loo, Wilson Lee, Pauline Tan, Riena Amirah, Adrian Choong dan ramai lagi. | Drama | |
| 15 Feb | Waruga: Kutukan Ilmu Hitam | D' Ayu Pictures | Mohd Azaromi bin Mohd Ghozali | Zahiril Adzim, Elvina Mohamad, Eriza Allya, Along Eyzendy, Syed Irfan, Izzue Islam, Sahronizam Noor, Ruminah Sidek | Horror | |
| 22 Feb | Janna Endoro | Double Channel Sdn. Bhd. | Sham Jr | Pekin Ibrahim, Trisha Ooi, Mohd Asrulfaizal, Wan Hanafi Su | Action | |
| 29 Feb | Tan-Ti-Ana | Dream At Work, NHF Production | Rosdi Md Dali | Atikah Suhaimie, Jay Iswazir, Joey Daud, Zalif Sidek, Baby Shima | Comedy, Horror | |
| 11 April | Leha | Alfanazra Productions | Mohd Azaromi bin Mohd Ghozali | Ali Puteh, Kodi Rasheed, D'Boy Hamdan, Silfeny Osman, Khir Rahman | Action | |
| 18 April | Sheriff: Narko Integriti | Skop Productions, Astro Shaw | Syafiq Yusof | Aaron Aziz, Esma Daniel, Shaharuddin Thamby, Zul Ariffin, Elizabeth Tan, Azira Shafinaz, Syafiq Kyle, Kodi Rasheed, Hazama Azmi, Azri Iskandar | Mistery, Action | |
| 25 April | Geng Kubur | Iron Hill Media Sdn Bhd, Empire Film Solution | Gavin Yap | Mia Sara Shauki, Firdaus Sudiyan, Lion Chong, Sasidaran S dan ramai lagi | Mistery, Thriller | |
| 2 May | Rebel | Rumah Produksi Merah, Wau Production | Awie | Ben Amir, Mk K. Clique, Shiqin Kamal, Nor Albaniah, Azlan Komeng dan ramai lagi | Action | |
| 9 May | Ngesot | Kash Pictures, Metrowealth Movies Production | Ayez Shaukat Fonseka Farid | Khir Rahman, Luqman Hafidz, Sharifah Sakinah, Zul Huzaimy | Adventure, Drama, Thriller | |
| 23 May | The Experts | Blackflag, Astro Shaw | Andre Chiew dan Nazim Shah | Wan Hanafi Su, Syafiq Kyle, Aaron Aziz, Tony Eusoff, Remy Ishak, Maya Karin, Hasnul Rahmat, Mimi Lana | Action, Crime | |
| 30 May | Memoir Seorang Guru | Kalam Ariff Holdings | Kyoll Hamzah | Rosyam Nor, Nabila Huda, Ellie Suriaty Omar, Trisha Ooi, Jesse Lim, Syazwan Zulkifli, Zul Huzaimy, Johan Asari | Drama | |
| 5 Jun | Legasi: Bomba the Movie | Multimedia Entertainment | James Lee dan Frank See | Nas-T, Ben Amir, Henley Hii, Fad Anuar dan ramai lagi. | Action, Drama, Thriller | |
| 6 Jun | Padu the Movie | Global Station, Primeworks Studios | Faisal Ishak | Jojo Goh, Melissa Campbell, Susan Lankester, Fify Azmi dan ramai lagi. | Sport | |
| 20 Jun | Abnormal: Buas | Respected Citizen Sdn. Bhd. | Azhari Zain | Aeril Zafrel, Shaheizy Sam, Nabila Huda, Adlin Aman Ramlie | Thriller | |
| 22 Aug | Takluk: Lahad Datu | Multimedia Entertainment, Golden Screen Cinemas, Astro, SixFun Media | Zulkarnain Azhar | Syafiq Kyle, Kamal Adli, Fikry Ibrahim, Anding Indrawani, Eman Manan, Riezman Khuzaimi | Action, Military | |
| 30 Aug | Pungut | Layar Pictures Sdn, Screen Studio Sdn Bhd | Areel Abu Bakar | Ruzaidi Abdul Rahman, Megat Sharizal, Fad Anuar, Aman Graseka, Aliff Yasraff | Action, Drama | |
| 11 Dec | Papa Zola: The Movie | Animonsta Studios | Nizam Razak | Himself | Animation, Adventure, Family | |

== Tamil Language Movie ==
| Opening | Title | Studio | Director | Cast | Genre | Ref. |
|---|---|---|---|---|---|---|
| 18 Jan | Black & White | Pocket Play | Logan | Logan, Sasi, Seelan Manoharan, Latha Ramasamy, Shamini Shradha | Comedy | |
| 1 Feb | Agrinai | Sai Nanthini Movie World | Thanesh Perrabu | Aghonderan Sahadevan, Umagandhan, Viknes Perrabu | Thriller / Science Fiction | |
| 15 Feb | Curry Mee | Poketplay | Kash Villanz | S. Gana, Ropie, Echo Quah, Nazira Ibrahim, Kavitha Sinniah | Comedy | |
| 7 Mar | Oru Kadha Sollattaa Sir | Poketplay | Kash Villanz | Kash Villanz, Vikadakavi Magen, CK, Ben G, Moon Nilaa, Thivya Naidu, Shivakanth, Lallu, Kim Fukazawa | Comedy Fantasy | |
| 21 Mar | Hero Friend-U | Dove Eyes | Martin R. Chantheran | Cellina Jay, Ravin Rao Santheran, Thevaguru Suppiah | Romance Comedy | |
| 21 Nov | C4 Cinta | Scifilm | Karthik Shamalan | Yuvaraj Krishnasamy, Pashini Sivakumar, Loga Varman | Romance Comedy | |
