= List of Malaysian films of 2020 =

This is a list of Malaysian films produced and released in 2020. Most of these films are produced in the Malay language, but there also a significant number of them that are produced in English, Mandarin, Cantonese and Tamil.

== 2020 ==
=== January – March ===
Opening		Title	Director	Cast	Notes	Ref.
J A N U A R Y	2	At Rainbow's End 2	Mark Lee	Sharmini Ramesh, Susila Devi, Morgan Chandra Dass	Fiery Films; Tamil-language film	
J A N U A R Y	9	Suraya	Feisal Azizuddin	Farihin Ufiya, Ainul Aishah, Amir Rahim, Azhar Amir	Feisk; MM2 Entertainment	
J A N U A R Y	16	The Garden of Evening Mists	Tom Shu-Yu Lin	Angelica Lee, Hiroshi Abe, Serene Lim, John Hannah, David Oakes	The Biscuit Film; Astro Shaw; Mandarin-language film	
J A N U A R Y	25	The God of Wealth	Jon Chong Chung Hoe	Eddy Ko, Jacky Kam, Frost Yaw, Benny Sii Tuong Kai	Star III E Media & Advertisement; Mega Films Distribution; Mandarin-language film	
J A N U A R Y	25	A Moment of Happiness	Tai Min Hwee	Min Chen Lin, Tul Pakorn, Chan Fong, Danny One, Thian Siew Kim	Lomo Pictures; MM2 Entertainment; Mandarin-language film	
J A N U A R Y	30	Fight Lah! Kopitiam	Lai Kin Hoong	Jack Lim, Cedric Loo, Wan Wai Fun, Steve Yap	Asia Tropical Films; GSC Movies; Mandarin-language film	
F E B R U A R Y	6	M4M4	Eyra Rahman	Nabila Huda, Bella Dowanna, Faizal Hussein, Kodi Rasheed, Ungku Haris, Niezam Zaidi, Izzy Reef, Eyra Hazali, Amanda Hariz	Da Motion Media; Empire Film Solution	
F E B R U A R Y	6	Good Wealth 2020	Teddy Chin	Bob Lam, Alvin Chong, Gan Mei Yan, Tou Kyzer, Jordan Voon, Sampson Chew, Loo Aye Keng	Jet Poh Asia Media; Mega Films Distribution; Mandarin-language film	
F E B R U A R Y	13	Santhittha Naal Muthal	V. Sheela Pravina	Nawinia Murali, Mervin, Kishalini	Top Movies; Tamil-language film	
F E B R U A R Y	20	Rock 4: Rockers Never Dai	Mamat Khalid	Sharwani, Hazama Azmi, Adam John, Nazimi Fahmi, Bulan Terry	Primeworks Studios	
F E B R U A R Y	20	Unakkagathane	Srikanth Subramaniam	Siva Shankar, Yasmin Nadiah	Immortal Production; Tamil-language film	
F E B R U A R Y	27	Ratu Kala Jengking	Bade Hj. Azmi	Nadia Brian, Amar Asyraf, Fizz Fairuz, Firman Siagan, Eyra Hazali, Fauziah Nawi	A. Aida Production; Skop Production	
M A R C H	5	Jodoh Syaitan	Ismail Bob Hasim	Soffi Jikan, Aprena Manrose, Abam, Jay Iswazir, Kamarul Yusoff, Fauziah Nawi	Da Motion Media; Empire Film Solution	
M A R C H	5	Paakaati Po	Kathir Raven S	Kathir Raven S, Santhini Antony, Sai Sangeetha, Pavin Raymond, Aadith	More Four Production; Tamil-language film	
M A R C H	12	Bulan Dan Pria Terhebat	Ghaz Abu Bakar	Zizan Razak, Zahirah MacWilson, Khir Rahman, Bell Ngasri, Maya Karin	Skop Production, Astro Shaw	
M A R C H	19	Roh	Emir Ezwan	Farah Ahmad, Mhia Farhana, Harith Haziq, Namron, Junainah	TGV Pictures	
M A R C H	19	Eye On The Ball	Chen Yih Wen	Sunny Shalesh, Asri Arshad, Azwan Azhar, Rollen Marakim	TGV Pictures	
M A R C H	26	Town Mall	Eizlan Yusof	Eizlan Yusof, Reen Rahim, Intan Ladyana, Nynaa Harizal, Jalaluddin Hassan	Aifa Motion Pictures	
M A R C H	26	Kenderaan Berat Ikut Kiri	Jefry Talib	Syafie Naswip, Farhanna Qismina, Ropie, Sathiya	MM2 Entertainment	
M A R C H	26	Escape	Ikhwansha Hazer	Kamal Adli, Elizabeth Tan, Amar Asyraf, Zamarul Hisham, Jalaluddin Hassan, Riz Amin, Jue Aziz, Pablo Amirul, Fiza Fukazawa	DMY Creation	

=== April – June ===
Opening		Title	Director	Cast	Notes	Ref.
A P R I L	2	Takut Ke Tak	Muzzamer Rahman	Nabil Aqil, Fabian Loo, Ika Nabella, Arwind Kumar, Han Zalini	GSC Movies	
