= List of Malaysian films of 2022 =

This is a list of Malaysian films produced and released in 2022. Most of these films are produced in the Malay language, but there also a significant number of them that are produced in Tamil, English, and Mandarin.

== Malay Language Movie ==
Opening	Title	Studio	Director	Cast	Genre	Gross (RM)	Ref.
17 February	Syahadan	Boss Pictures	Halim Hassan and Fairus Hussain	Taqiyuddin Hamid, Al Jufferi Jamari, Fauzi Khalid	Martial Art		
24 February	Rumah	Mojo Projects	Kayshan	Erra Fazira, Puteri Balqis, Mak Jah	Fantasy Horror		
17 March	Gila Gusti	Lomo Pictures		Syafie Naswip, Eluzabrth Tan	Action Comedy		
23 Jun	Mat Kilau		Syamsul Yusof	Adi Putra, Beto Kusyairy, Fattah Amin, Johan As'ari	Biographical film	RM97 million	
4 August	Jerangkung Dalam Almari	Akid Productions	Shadan Hashim	Adi Putra, Sophia Albarakbah, Hasnul Rahmat, Wan Hanafi Su	Horror		
25 August	Air Force The Movie: Selagi Bernyawa	Golden Screen Cinemas	Zulkarnain Azhar	Sangeeta Krishnasamy, Aiman Hakim Ridza, Luqman Hafidz, Pablo Amirul, Scha Alyahya.	Action		

== Tamil Language Movie ==
Opening	Title	Studio	Director	Cast	Genre	Gross (RM)	Ref.
27 January	Poochandi	Poketplay Sdn. Bhd.	JK Wicky	RJ Ramana, Ganesan Manohgaran, Tinesh Sarathi Krishnan, Logan, Hamsni Perumal	Thriller, horror	800000	
10 February	Aval Thediyathu	AT Movies	BGW	BGW, Subashini, Sanjna Suri, Irfan Zaini	Comedy, horror		
24 February	Narigal	Boss Pictures	RMS Sara	RMS Sara.R, Jayarajendran John, Alvin Martin, Nithyashree, Lingeswaran.	Action, thriller		
28 February	Kambathe Kannemma	D' Cinema	K K Khana	Sangeeta Krishnasamy, Sasikumar Kandasamy, Tokoh Sathia, Lockup Nathan	Comedy		
24 March	Viman	SB Production	Kishok	Kishok, Jasmin Michael, Coco Nantha, Jee Kutty.	Superhero		
16 June	Arul Mozhi	Jaysanga Sir	Manan Subra	Sangabalan Subramaniam, Alvin Martin, Vikadakavi Magen, Pashini Sivakumar	Action, drama.		
23 June	Moondram Athigharam	Kalki Production	Sd Puvanendran	Jibrail Rajhula, Haridhass S, Kavitha Thiagarajan	Action		
25 August	Undercover Rascals 2		V. Nagaraj	Bala Ganapathi William, K.K Khanna, G Crak Karnan, Rupini Krishnan, Irfan Zaini	Action		
28 July	Senthozhan Sengkathirvaana	Poketplay	Govind Singh	Kash Villanz, Moon Nila	Thriller		
25 October	Gajen	Veedu Production	S.Mathan	Denes Kumar, Jasmin Michael, Abhirami Venkatachalam	Romantic Comedy		

== Punjabi Language Movie ==
- Mundey Kampung Dey - First Punjabi language movie produced in Malaysia.
