= List of Malaysian films of 2023 =

This is a list of Malaysian films produced and released in 2023. Most of these films are produced in the Malay language, but there also a significant number of them that are produced in Tamil, English, and Mandarin

== Malay Language Movie ==
Opening	Title	Studio	Director	Cast	Genre	Gross (RM)	Ref.
5 January	Escape	DMY Creation	Ikhwansha Hazer	Kamal Adli, Elizabeth Tan, Amar Asyraf, Zamarul Hisham, Riz Amin, Jue Aziz, Pablo Amirul, Dato' Jalaluddin Hassan	Action Thriller		
19 January	Duan Nago Bogho	Empire Film Solution	Sabri Yunus	Sangeeta Krishnasamy, Mohd Asrulfaizal, Jojo Goh, Sabri Yunus, Rosyam Nor	Drama		
26 January	Eva		Suhaiza Aziz	Nadia Aqilah, Nadia Brian, Shamsul Danish	Thriller		
2 February	Coast Guard Malaysia: Ops Helang		Pitt Hanif	Adlin Aman Ramlie, Julia Farhana, Sabri Yunus, Saharul Ridzwan	Action		
9 February	Harum Malam		Dain Said	Bront Palarae, Idan Aedan, Nabila Huda, Remy Ishak	Horror		
23 February	Didi & Friends The Movie	Astro Shaw	Hairulfaizalizwan Ahmad Sofian Sinan Ismail		Animation		
2 March	Imam		Mior Hashim Manap	Faizal Hussein, M. Nasir, Vanidah Imran, Rahim Razali	Religious Drama		
9 March	Pulau	GSC Movies	Euho	Vikar, Amelia Henderson, Alif Satar, Sanjna Suri	Horror / Thriller		
18 May	Polis Evo 3	Astro Shaw	Syafiq Yusof	Shaheizy Sam, Zizan Razak, Nora Danish, Eyka Farhana	Comedy Action		
22 June	Jemputan Ke Neraka	GSC Movies	Amor Rizan	Hariz Hamdan, Nick Syaf, Amy Nur Tinie, Janna Nick, Hafreez Adam, Alif Hadi, Aleza Shadan	Horror / Thriller		
24 August	Malbatt: Misi Bakara	GSC Movies	Adrian Teh	Bront Palarae, Shaheizy Sam, Hairul Azreen, Zahiril Adzim, Iedil Dzuhrie, Adlin Aman Ramlie, Fauzi Nawawi, Tony Eusoff	Action Thriller		
14 September	Walid	Empire Film Solution	Areel Abu Bakar	Megat Shahrizal, Putri Qaseh, Namron, Fad Anuar	Drama		
21 September	Mat Kola	Empire Film Solution	Hafiz Nafiah	aiyuddin Bakar, Usop, Azman Ahmad, Rozita Che Wan, Putri Hanan, Ropie	Comedy		

== Tamil Language Movie ==
Opening	Title	Studio	Director	Cast	Genre	Gross (RM)	Ref.
26 January	Adai Mazhai Kaalam	Poketplay Sdn. Bhd.	Karthik Shamalan	Loga Varman, Thia Lakshana, Evarani, Sasitharan K Rajool	Romance Drama		
2 Feb	Sawadikap Pei	Poketplay Sdn. Bhd.	Roman Anthony	Gana, Ellicia Wong, Nandu Ramesh, Kuben Mahadevan	Horror Comedy		
9 Feb	Thallipogathey	Dreamhouse	Guna Jayakumar	Hamsni Perumal, Thevaguru Suppiah, Vicky Rao	Romantic Comedy		
16 Feb	Aadhitya Arunachalam	Poketplay Sdn. Bhd	Ben G	Gaffar, Banumathi, Mcva, Aghonderan Sahadevan, Ben G	Action		
29 Jun	Rajathanthiram: The Piano	Poketplay Sdn. Bhd.	Aaron Rao	Moon Nila, Thevaguru Suppiah, K.S Maniam, S. Haridhass	Fantasy		
6 Jul	Club House	Triple S Films	Amin	Deisho Sivabaalan, Shamvanan, Leanesh Sivabaalan	Action Thriller		
27 Jul	Kanneera	Poketplay Sdn. Bhd	Kathir Raven S	Kathir Raven S, Maya Glammy, Nanthakumar NKR, Chandhine Kaur	Romantic Drama		
21 Sept	Vinveli Devathai	Story Films	Shalini Balasundaram	Shalini Balasundaram, Auro Chakkravarthy	Romantic Comedy		
23 Nov	Naam Katra Isai		T. Danesh Kumar	Saresh D7, Alvin Martin, Kaameshaa Ravindran	Drama / Musical		
