= Eja =

Malaysian actress

- Born: Siti Shahrizah binti Saifuddin; 18 January 1972 (age 54); Kampung Rasa Tambahan, Kuala Kubu Bharu, Selangor, Malaysia
- Occupations: Actress, Host, model
- Years active: 1997–present
- Spouse: Mohd. Silahuddin Jamaluddin
- Family: Nur Eishal Mohd. Silahuddin (child)

Siti Shahrizah "Eja" Saifuddin (born 18 January 1972) is a Malaysian actress of television and film. She first gained fame as the co-host in Roda Impian, the Malaysian version of Wheel of Fortune. After leaving the game show, she hosted a number of TV shows and became an actress through a number of drama series.

== Early life ==
Eja was born and raised in Kuala Kubu Baru, Selangor, she was the daughter of a marine police officer. She initially took a secretarial course after finishing form five, before deciding to join the Malaysia Airlines ( MAS ) as a flight attendant. Six years later, she ventured into acting career. In 1997, she got offered to host a variety of music programs on TV3, Video Skop.

== Filmography ==
=== Film ===
Year	Title	Role	Notes
1999	Anak Mami The Movie	Julia	
2001	Sara	Rozita	
2006	Bilut	Aishah	
2006	Misi: 1511	Camelia	
2007	Kayangan	Suraya	
2008	Sepi	Marya	
2009	Maut	Jasmin	
2010	Janin		
2014	Manisnya Cinta Di Cappadoccia	Aida	

=== Television ===
- Ejen 88 & 44
- Rahsia Demi Rahsia
- Teduh Kabus
- Salam Taj Mahal (2000)
- Kiranya Ku Tahu (2000)
- Takhta Hati
- Tiga Dara – Tan, Tin Tun
- Rindu Semakin Jauh (2004)
- Kalau Itu Takdirnya (2004)
- Masih Ada Cinta
- Wajah Kekasih
- Cinta Semerbak Kayu Manis
- Mya Zara (2006)
- Seputih Qaseh Ramadan
- Sadiq & Co
- Telefilem Rantai (2016)

=== Drama ===
- Dimata Mu Aku
- Dijiwa Mu Dia (2002)
- Pembunuh Upahan (2003)
- Igawan (2004)
- Syawal (2005)
- Cahaya Hati
- Sangga Saadah
- Talkin Terakhir
- Wadi Unung (2009)
- Satu Permintaan (2011)

== Awards and nominations ==
=== Malaysia Film Festival ===
Year	Nominated work	Category	Result
2006	Bilut	Best Actress	Nominated
2011	Janin	Best Actress	Won

=== ABPBH Awards ===
Year	Category	Result
2005	Most Popular TV Actress	Nominated
2006	Most Popular TV Actress	Nominated
2007	Most Popular TV Actress	Nominated
2011	Most Popular Film Actress	Nominated

=== Skrin Awards ===
Year	Nominated work	Category	Result
2007	Sirah	Best Actress (Drama)	Nominated
2011	Janin	Best Actress (Film)	Won
