= Asia-Pacific Film Festival =

Film festival

Opening event of the 22nd Asia Pacific Film Festival held at the Busan Civic Center in 1976

The Asia-Pacific Film Festival (abbreviated APFF) is an annual film festival hosted by the Federation of Motion Picture Producers in Asia-Pacific (FPA). The festival was first held in Tokyo, Japan, in 1954.

== History ==
The festival was first held in Tokyo, Japan, in 1954 as the Southeast Asian Film Festival (AFF). In addition to Japan, Hong Kong, the Federation of Malaya, the Philippines, Taiwan, and Thailand participated. The festival was subsequently held in a different country each year, and its name was changed to the Asia-Pacific Film Festival by its 28th edition in 1983. From 1972 to 1976, the film festival was temporarily run as a non competition film market, after acknowledging the over heating of competitions surrounding prizes by member states.

== Editions ==
Edition	Year	Host	Best Film winners		Ref.
Edition	Year	Host	Title	Country	Ref.
1	1954	Tokyo, Japan	Golden demon (金色夜叉, Konjiki Yasha)	Japan	
2	1955	Singapore	Shunkin Monogatari (春琴物語)	Japan	
3	1956	Hong Kong	Child of Sorrow	Philippines	
4	1957	Tokyo, Japan	Suzakumon	Japan	
5	1958	Manila, Philippines	Our Sister Heddy	British Hong Kong	
6	1959	Kuala Lumpur, Malaya	The Kingdom and the Beauty	British Hong Kong	
7	1960	Tokyo, Japan	Rear Entrance (後門, Hòu mén)	British Hong Kong	
8	1961		Nocturne of a Woman (女は夜化粧する, Onna wa yoru kesshô suru)	Japan	
9	1962		The Houseguest and My Mother	South Korea	
10	1963		Twin Sisters of Kyoto	Japan	
11	1964		Oyster Girl (蚵女)	Taiwan	
12	1965		The Grand Substitution (萬古流芳)	British Hong Kong	
13	1966	Seoul, South Korea	The Blue and the Black (藍與黑)	British Hong Kong	
14	1967	Tokyo, Japan	Susanna	British Hong Kong	
15	1968	—	Cancelled		
16	1969		Jade Goddess (玉觀音)	Taiwan	
17	1970		Apa Jang Kau Tjari, Palupi?	Indonesia	
18	1971		Samiun dan Dasima	Indonesia	
23	1977		Sensei no tsushinbo (先生のつうしんぼ)	Japan	
24	1978		The Eternal Love (永恒的爱)	Taiwan	
25	1979		Pengemis dan Tukang Becak	Indonesia	
26	1980	Yogyakarta and Bali, Indonesia	The Battle of Port Arthur	Japan	
	1981	Manila, Philippines	Cancelled		
27	1982	Kuala Lumpur, Malaysia	Oridathoru Phayalvaan	India	
28	1983	Taipei, Taiwan	The Makioka Sisters	Japan	
29	1984		Appassionata	Japan	
31	1986	Seoul, South Korea	Mementos	Indonesia	
32	1987		The Surrogate Woman	South Korea	
33	1988	Phuket, Thailand			
34	1989	Indonesia	Buddies	Japan	
35	1990	Kuching, Sarawak, Malaysia			
36	1991	Taipei, Taiwan	A Brighter Summer Day	Taiwan	
37	1992	Seoul, South Korea	Pushing Hands	Taiwan	
38	1993		Cageman	British Hong Kong	
39	1994		Eat Drink Man Woman	Taiwan	
40	1995		Siao Yu	Taiwan	
41	1996	Auckland, New Zealand	A Petal	South Korea	
42	1997	Cheju Island, South Korea	Such a Life	Taiwan	
43	1998	Taipei, Taiwan	Daun di Atas Bantal	Indonesia	
44	1999	Bangkok, Thailand	Nang Nak	Thailand	
45	2000	Hanoi, Vietnam	Sandy Lives	Vietnam	
46	2001	Jakarta, Indonesia	What Time Is It There?	Taiwan	
47	2002	Seoul, South Korea	Inochi	Japan	
48	2003	Shiraz, Iran	A Little Monk	South Korea	
49	2004	Fukuoka, Japan	Taipai 21	Taiwan	
50	2005	Kuala Lumpur, Malaysia	Taegukgi	South Korea	
51	2006	Taipei, Taiwan	The Unwanted Woman	Iran	
	2007	—	—	—	
	2008	—	—	—	
52	2009		Rainbow Troops	Indonesia	
	2010				
53	2011		Janala	India	
54	2012		Life Without Principle	Hong Kong	
55	2013		Like Father, Like Son	Japan	
	2014		—	—	
	2015	—	—	—	
	2016	—	—	—	
56	2017		The Unnamed	Bangladesh	
57	2018		Lion	Australia	
58	2019				
59	2020		Guang	Malaysia	
60	2023				
61	2024		Detective Chinatown 3	China	
62	2025	Kuala Lumpur, Malaysia	Crawling Crows – Aankha	Nepal	
"—" denotes festival was not held that year.

- Crawling Crows – Aankha* won the **Best Film** award at the **62nd Asia Pacific Film Festival (2025)** held in Malaysia.
