= Aziz M. Osman =

Malaysian actor, director and producer

- عزيز عيم عثمان
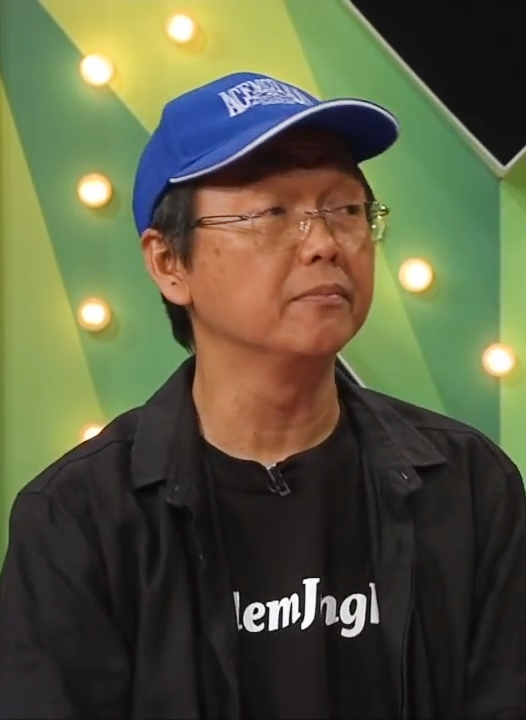
- Aziz interviewed on MeleTOP in 2015.
- Born: Aziz bin Othman Yusof; 2 October 1962 (age 63); Hougang, Singapore
- Citizenship: Malaysia
- Occupations: Actor; director; screenwriter; producer
- Years active: 1963–present
- Children: 8
- Parents: M. Osman (father); Afida Es (mother)
- Relatives: Dato' Zulkifli M. Osman (brother)

Aziz M. Osman (born 2 October 1962) is a Singaporean-Malaysian actor, director, screenwriter and producer. He is the director general of his own production company, Ace Motion Pictures.

== Career ==
Aziz started his acting career as an infant in 1963 film, Ibu Ayam directed by Salleh Ghani. In 1976, at the age of 14, he alongside his three siblings took a role in 1976 film, Sayang Anakku Sayang directed by Jamil Sulong and is a remake of a 1970 Shaw Brothers film, The Younger Generation. The film earned Aziz the Best Child Star at the 22nd Asia Pacific Film Festival.

His directing career begin in 1990 when he directed his debut film, Fenomena, which stars Ramona Rahman and M. Nasir. Aziz a fan of science fiction films made by Steven Spielberg and George Lucas, which inspired him to write and direct Malaysia's first science fiction film, XX Ray. He also took the main role as a university student named Amir. The success of XX Ray led him to directed its two sequels, which released in 1995 and 2019 respectively. The third sequel received negative reviews upon its release. Since then, he directed more commercially successful films including Puteri Impian (1997) and Leftenan Adnan (2000).

== Personal life ==
He was born in Hougang, Singapore and raised in Kuala Lumpur, Malaysia.

His father is M. Osman, a Malaysian singer in 1960s, while his mother Afida Es is an actress. His brother Zulkifli is also a film director. Aziz has been married three times and has 7 children from these marriages.

== Filmography ==
=== Film ===
Year	Title	Credited as			Role	Notes
Year	Title	Actor	Director	Producer	Role	Notes
1963	Ibu Ayam	Yes			Children	Debut film appearances
1976	Sayang Anakku Sayang	Yes			Aziz	
1979	Pasung Puaka	Yes				
1990	Fenomena		Yes		—	
1992	XX Ray	Yes	Yes		Amir	
1994	Femina	Yes	Yes		Journalist	
1994	Fantasi	Yes	Yes		Reporter	
1995	XX Ray II	Yes	Yes	Yes	Amir	Executive producer
1995	Penyu			Yes	—	
1996	Scoop		Yes	Yes	—	
1997	Baginda		Yes		—	
1997	Puteri Impian	Yes	Yes			
1998	Puteri Impian 2	Yes	Yes		Mr Ravi	
1999	Senario The Movie	Yes	Yes	Yes	Newreader	
2000	Leftenan Adnan	Yes	Yes	Yes	Feast Guests	
2000	Senario Lagi	Yes	Yes		Hotel Worker	
2001	Seri Dewi Malam		Yes		—	
2001	Lagi Lagi Senario	Yes	Yes		Fish Catcher	
2002	Idola		Yes		—	
2002	Gerak Khas The Movie II	Yes			Taxi Drivers	
2002	Mr. Cinderella	Yes			Bob	
2003	Gila-Gila Pengantin		Yes	Yes	—	
2003	Gila Bola	Yes			Abang Lisa	
2004	Trauma		Yes		—	
2004	Bintang Hati		Yes		—	
2004	Biar Betul		Yes		—	
2004	Gila-Gila Pengantin Remaja		Yes	Yes	—	
2005	Senario XX	Yes	Yes		Villagers	
2005	Gila-Gila Pengantin Popular		Yes	Yes	—	
2006	Senario Pemburu Emas Yamashita		Yes		—	
2008	Cicakman 2: Planet Hitam	Yes			Fulus News Boss	
2009	Lembing Awang Pulang Ke Dayang	Yes			Dekar Agas & Raja Muda Bugis	
2009	Setem	Yes			Postman	
2009	My Spy	Yes			Bodyguard 1	
2010	Lu Pikirlah Sendiri De Movie	Yes			Old Punks	
2010	Jin Notti	Yes			Hisyam / Razlan	
2011	Al-Hijab	Yes				
2012	Azura	Yes	Yes			
2012	Untuk Tiga Hari	Yes				
2013	Papadom 2	Yes			Postman	
2014	Dollah Superstar	Yes			Director	
2015	Jengka			Yes	—	The first film issue, producer
2017	Bukan Cinta Malaikat		Yes		—	He directed it with Herdanous Labobu
2017	Kerja Kahwin	Yes				
2018	Busker	Yes			Professor	
2019	XX Ray III	Yes	Yes		Amir	
2020	Tyickoouns	Yes			Mannan father	
2021	18 Puasa Di Kampong Pisang	Yes			Pak Jabit	
2021	Kampong Pisang Musikal Raya Istimewa	Yes			Pak Jabit	
2021	Chomel	Yes			Bidin	
2021	Antaramasa	Yes			Prof. Amir	
2021	Mat Bond Malaya	Yes				
2021	Kampong Pisang Kita Setandan	Yes			Pak Jabit	Short film
2022	Kampong Pisang Berbuah Dua Kali	Yes			Pak Jabit	
2022	Jaga-Jaga Senarionion	Yes	Yes	Yes	Dr. Kamarul	
2022	Juang		Yes		—	He directed it with Datuk Yusry Abdul Halim, Matt Lai, Osman Ali and Kabir Bhatia
2023	Coast Guard Malaysia: Ops Helang	Yes			Rahmat	
2023	Geng Sakau Vs Hantu Ting Tong	Yes			Pak Ajak	
2024	Banglo Seksyen 12			Yes	—	Also as supervising producer
2024	19 Puasa Playboys Of Plestik Hitam	Yes			Abang Ajis / Pak Jabit	
2024	The Experts	Yes			Film director	Special appearances alongside Soffi Jikan
2024	Baik Punya Ah Long	Yes			Ustaz Hanif	
2024	Geng Jin	Yes			Tok Ketua	
2025	6 Jilake	Yes	Yes			

=== Television series ===
Year	Title	Credited as			Role	TV channel	Notes
Year	Title	Actor	Director	Producer	Role	TV channel	Notes
1981	Drama Minggu Ini: Tok Awang	Yes				TV1	
1993–1996	Cili Padi		Yes		—	TV3	
1998	Cinderella	Yes			Borhan	TV3	
1999	Romeo & Juliet	Yes			Zack	TV3	
2005–2008	Puteri		Yes	Yes	—	TV3	
2005–2009	Dunia Anita		Yes	Yes	—	TV3	
2006–2007	Misi XX Ray	Yes	Yes		Professor Amir	TV3	
2007–2010	Bong		Yes	Yes	—	TV9	
2007–2009	Kisah Kaisara			Yes	—	TV3	
2007–2009	Fara	Yes	Yes	Yes	Dr. Salim	TV3	Episode: "Duta Produk"
2008	Romeo		Yes	Yes	—	TV3	
2008	Pendekar 5		Yes	Yes	—	TV3	
2008	Vice Versa	Yes	Yes	Yes	Yusri	TV3	
2008	Luna Fantasiku		Yes	Yes	—	Tonton	
2008	Sari Maya	Yes				TV9	Special appearance
2009	Permanduku Jutawan		Yes	Yes	—	TV3	
2009	Kapten Kit		Yes		—	TV3	
2009	Comel		Yes	Yes	—	TV3	
2013	Demi Dia		Yes		—	TV3	
2016	Gerak Khas (Season 16)	Yes				TV2	Episode: "Lintah Darat"
2017	Gerak Khas (Season 17)		Yes		—	TV2	Episode: "Love Scam", co-director
2017	Dia Bidadariku		Yes		—	Astro Ria	
2017	My Darling, Inspektor Daniel		Yes		—	Astro Ria	
2017	Anak Merdeka		Yes		—	Astro Prima	1 episode
2018	Gerak Khas (Season 18)		Yes		—	TV2	Episode: "Gadis Maya"
2019	Gerak Khas (Season 19)		Yes		—	TV2	Episode: "Dendam Menular"
2019	Gerak Khas (Season 19)		Yes		—	TV2	Episode: "Belut"
2019	Gerak Khas (Season 19)		Yes		—	TV2	Episode: "Ejen Penjerat"
2019	Gerak Khas (Season 19)		Yes		—	TV2	Episode: "Curang"
2020	Kampong Pisang Bersiri-siri	Yes			Pak Jabit	Astro Citra	
2021	Gerak Khas (Season 20)		Yes		—	TV3	Episode: "Taiwan Money Scam"
2021	Gerak Khas (Season 20)		Yes		—	TV3	Episode: "Gadis Lari"
2021	Kisah Rumah Tangga		Yes		—	Astro Ria	Episode: "Mencantum Cinta"
2021	Keluarga Baha Don (Season 3)	Yes			Commissioner	Viu	
2021	Dukun Diva	Yes				Astro Citra	
2022	Puteri Reunion	Yes			Azizan Rosman	TV3	
2022	SMK (Season 4)		Yes		Dato' Idris	Astro Ceria	
2022	Aku Seorang Polis				—	YouTube	
2022	Kamcing	Yes			Tok Daud	Sooka	
2023	Legenda Putri Qaseh	Yes			Hidayat	Astro Ceria	
2023	B.A.R.I.S.T.A: Misi Terpaling Sulit	Yes			Pak Ngah	Astro Ria	
2024	I.D.	Yes			Pok Me	Astro Premier	
2025	One Cent Thief (Season 2)	Yes			President Tuan Seri Khalid Ilyas	Astro Citra	

=== Telemovie ===
Year	Title	Credited as			Role	TV channel
Year	Title	Actor	Director	Producer	Role	TV channel
1985	Nanti Mati	Yes				TV1
1987	Mawas		Yes		—	TV3
1991	Wawasan		Yes		—	TV1
1992	Anak Angkat		Yes		—	
1993	Tunggu Sekejap		Yes		—	
1994	Cinta Selluloid		Yes		—	
2003	Neon	Yes			Restaurant Patrons I	VCD
2017	16 Puasa	Yes			Aziz	Astro First Exclusive
2017	Karya 12 Vol 2: Semerah Darah	Yes			Joe	Astro Citra
2019	17 Puasa	Yes			Aziz	Astro First Exclusive
2020	Cik Petir Putrajaya		Yes		—	TV3
2021	Kampong Bharu		Yes		—	TV2
2021	Saka MySejahtera	Yes			Tok Manap	Astro Citra
2022	Raya-Nion		Yes		—	Sooka
2023	Raya Heist	Yes			Hj. Osman	Tonton
2023	Dalang	Yes			Ikhlas	Tonton
2024	Hentian Gerik		Yes		—	Astro Warna
2024	Jodoh Geng G	Yes			Ayah Ku	Astro Warna

== Awards and nominations ==
- Best Director (Baginda) ... TV3's Anugerah Skrin 97/98, 1998
- Best Editor (Femina) ... 11th Malaysia Film Festival, 1994
- Best Art Director (Femina) ... 11th Malaysia Film Festival, 1994
- Promising New Director (Fenomena) ... 9th Malaysia Film Festival, 1990
- Best Child Actor (Sayang Anakku Sayang) ... 22nd Asia Film Festival, South Korea, 1976
