= Saiful Apek =

Malaysian actor and comedian

- صيفول اڤيك
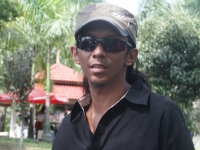
- Saiful Apek in 2008
- Born: Muhammad Saiful Azam bin Mohamed Yusoff; 12 May 1969 (age 57); Gombak, Selangor, Malaysia
- Other name: Apek Senario / Saiful
- Occupations: Actor, comedian, director, singer, host, entertainer
- Years active: 1994–present
- Known for: Senario, Melodi, Sinaran Pasport Kegemilangan, Cicakman
- Title: Malaysia's No.1 Comedian
- Spouse: Roslina Abu Hassan (m. 1994)
- Children: 2
- Awards: Bintang Paling Popular - Anugerah Bintang Popular Berita Harian (ABPBH) 2003

Muhammad Saiful Azam Mohamed Yusoff (born 12 May 1969), better known by his stage name Saiful Apek is a comedian from Malaysia. He was once called "Malaysia's No.1 Comedian" during his heyday and is called "Sifu" by comedians today.

Apart from comedy, he is known as a Malaysian actor, director, singer, host and performer. He is also an actor who has starred in the most films in Malaysia from the past to the present until he broke the tradition as the comedian who holds the most main characters in each of his acting films. Earlier, he was a former member of the group Senario and left the group a few years later. However, he is now back with the group with the original members and rebranding themselves as Senariounion.

He was once named the Most Popular Star, Berita Harian Most Popular Star Award (ABPBH) 2003 and then carved his name in history as the first comedian to win the award. Most recently, he was named the recipient of the 2021 Comedy Icon Award at the 2021 Malaysian Industry & Entrepreneur Personality Awards. At the end of 2021, he was invited to enter the Astro-produced singing program, Gegar Vaganza Season 8 as a duo with Yassin Yahya/Anye and was known as the group Sa.Ya.

== Early life ==
He was born as Mohd Saifulazam bin Mohd Yusoff in Gombak, Selangor. On his birth certificate and identity card, it says 15 August 1969 but the fact is, Saiful's date of birth is 12 May 1969. The confusion was due to the events of 13 May 1969 when he had to be handed over to another family for unavoidable reasons and then only registered.

Saiful was initially raised by a woman named Jahindun binti Haji Sahin and her second husband, Haji Mohammad Jaafar Ali until the death of his mother when Saiful was 21 years old.

Only on the day of his mother's funeral, Saiful found out that he was an adopted child after not being allowed to kiss the forehead of his adoptive mother's mortal remains.

Around 1991, after migrating to Singapore, he was moved to find a biological parent who had long been separated. After obtaining information from various sources, he was finally found with 6 siblings along with his two biological parents, namely Rahmah binti Uyub and Husin bin Hashim.

In 1994, while at the Subang Parade shopping mall, he accidentally met his best friend who at the time was managing the registration of a television audition, Sinaran Pasport Kegemilangan had registered him as a participant. That was the starting point of Saiful Apek's career as an industry player in Malaysia.

== Career ==
Saiful's talent (who was then 25 years old) was discovered through the first season of Sinaran Pasport Kegemilangan competition in 1994 organized by TV3, thus becoming popular through the sitcom Senario which aired until 2013. He was also the host of TV3's most popular entertainment show, Melodi with Fauziah Ahmad Daud by using the name Apek.

Saiful owns his own production company, Gitu-Gitu Productions Sdn Bhd and was named the Most Popular Star at the Berita Harian Popular Star Award 2003 (ABPBH03). Apek made his first film appearance through a special guest character in the film Puteri Impian 2 directed by Aziz M. Osman and starring Amy Mastura. Apek and his group, Senario appeared together in their acting debut film, Senario The Movie which premiered in 1999. In this film, Apek played the role of the party boss, Apek later appeared in four more Senario acting films.

He also appeared in the telefilm Neon (2003) directed by Mohd Feroz Abdul Kader starring Faizal Yusup and Erik Fuzi with many actors including Azhar Sulaiman, Aziz M. Osman, Rashidi Ishak, Sofi Jikan, Aziz Sattar, Kuswadinata, Abby Abadi, Serina Redzuawan, Zila Bakarin, Rita Rudaini, Kartina Aziz and many more. Apek appeared with Faizal Hussein and Zul Yahya in the investigative comedy action film MX3 directed by Yusof Kelana which premiered on 25 November 2003.

Apart from that, his famous acting films are Jutawan Fakir, KL Menjerit, Gangster, Laila Isabella, Cinta Luar Biasa, Biar Betul, Gila-Gila Pengantin Popular, Kuliah Cinta, Man Laksa, Duyung, Anak Mami Kembali, Nana Tanjung, Otai, Bujang Senang, Ladyboss, Cicakman and many more.

On 1 November 2004, Apek launched his fan club Apek's F.C (A.F.C) to strengthen the relationship between him and the fans.

Saiful's most successful acting film for 2006 was Cicak-Man directed by Yusry Abdul Halim. This is the first superhero film in Malaysia. He played the main character, along with the actors involved including Fasha Sandha, Aznil Nawawi, Yasmin Hani, Yusry KRU, Jalaluddin Hassan, AC Mizal and Adlin Aman Ramlie. Apek plays the character of Hairi, a young man who accidentally swallows a lizard that is in the process of being tested in the laboratory. He and his close friend, Danny, worked at a company owned by Professor Klon, in Metrofulus City. In the same year, he appeared in the casual comedy show Gitu-Gitu Apek which aired on Astro Ria.

Apek plays the role of Jimmy in the fictional comedy film, Duyung directed by Assoc Prof A. Razak Mohaideen who paired him with Maya Karin who plays the role of Puteri. The film premiered on 6 March 2008 to commercial success. He also contributed his voice to the soundtrack of the film by singing a song entitled "Aspalela".

Apek returned to his role as Hairi/Cicakman in the film Cicakman 2 - Black Planet which premiered on 11 December 2008. His character Cicakman also made a special appearance in the film The Wedding Game.

He was offered to join Maharaja Lawak Mega 2015, but refused to maintain his position as a senior comedian. For him, there is nothing else he has to prove on the comedy stage.

However, he accepted the offer to join the Gegar Vaganza Season 8 singing program at the end of 2021 on the grounds of 'keep learning' because he is aware that in the field of singing, there is still a lot of knowledge that he needs to learn and overlooked during his youth.

== Personal life ==
Saiful grew up in Petaling Jaya ("PJ"), and his primary school education was received at SRJK Alam Shah (2) in Section 11, PJ. \

In his Ujian Penilaian Darjah 5, he received an offer to study at Kolej Melayu Kuala Kangsar.

He married Roslina Abu Hassan on 11 June 1994. They have two sons, Mohd Riyadh Aslam and Mohd Radzin Aiman.

He also owns the Gitu-Gitu Char Koey Tiaw restaurant which operates in Penang. In 2013, Apek quit smoking due to health concerns.

== Controversy ==
Saiful Apek was found guilty of injecting cannabis into his body on 12 June 2010. On 22 May 2013, the Shah Alam High Court ordered him to defend himself after allowing the prosecution's appeal against the Magistrate's Court's decision to acquit them of the charges on 25 June of the same year.

Apek and his employees were released after finding that the prosecution had failed to prove a prima facie case. On 25 April 2014, Apek and three of his employees were each fined RM2,500 by the High Court here on Friday after being found guilty of injecting cannabis into the body.

== Filmography ==
Key
‡	Movies not shown

=== Film ===
Year	Title	Role	Notes
1998	Puteri Impian 2	Himself	Debut film appearances
1999	Senario The Movie	Apek	
2000	Mimpi Moon	Studio Singer	
2000	Senario Lagi	Saiful	
2001	Lagi-Lagi Senario	Saiful	
2002	KL Menjerit	Kilat	
2002	Anak Mami The Movie	Rickshaw Puller	
2003	Gila Bola	Luncai	
2003	Jutawan Fakir	Fakir bin Miskin	
2003	Laila Isabella	Harun	
2003	MX3	Masdor	
2003	Lang Buana	Gunung	
2004	Berlari Ke Langit	Himself	
2004	Biar Betul	Khai	As co-producer
2004	Bintang Hati	Complex Manager	
2004	Cinta Luar Biasa	Husin	
2004	Gila-Gila Pengantin Remaja	Wong	
2004	Kuliah Cinta	Terry	
2005	Anak Mami Kembali	Saiful	
2005	Gangster	Black	
2005	Gila-Gila Pengantin Popular	Zul	
2005	GK3 The Movie	Saiful	
2005	KL Menjerit 1	Kilat	
2005	Lady Boss	Saiful	As associate producer and co-producer
2005	Senario XX	Jeneral Zoragas	
2005	Tak Ori Tapi Ok	Zali	
2006	Main-Main Cinta	Mr. Aznil	
2006	Man Laksa	Fadhil Mat Dom	
2006	Bujang Senang	Bujang/Datuk Azlan	
2006	Nana Tanjung	Akhbar Khan	
2006	Salah Bapak	Selamat	
2006	Cicak Man	Hairi/Cicakman	
2007	Otai	Aiman Tan Sri Mydin	
2007	Nana Tanjung 2	Akhbar Khan	
2008	Duyung	Jimmy	
2008	Cicakman 2: Planet Hitam	Hairi/Cicakman	
2009	The Wedding Game	Cicak-man	Special appearance
2009	Sifu & Tongga	Sifu	
2010	Kecoh Betul	Abang Don	
2010	4 Madu	Azlan/Azrul	
2010	Magika	Hang Tuah	
2011	Raya Tak Jadi!	Shuib	
2012	Bujang Terlajak	Saiful	
2012	Hantu Air	Yassin	
2012	Sofazr The Movie - Jiwa Kacau	Apong	
2012	Shh...Dia Datang ‡	Enol	As director, screenwriter and producer
2013	Rock Ooo	Wan Megat	
2013	Kecoh Hantu Raya Tok Chai	Ebby	
2014	Mana Mau Lari	Tak Tau	
2014	Werewolf Dari Bangladesh	Mirdu	
2015	Gangsterock Kasi Sengat	Bromo	
2016	Lu Mafia Gua Gangster		
2016	Muluk Dan Konco: Hero Malaya ‡		
2017	Pak Pong	Tok Belantara	
2019	XX Ray 3	Azli	Cameo appearance
2019	Banglasia 2.0	Omar	
2019	KL Vampires	Syakir	
2020	Syif Malam Raya	Mr. Khairul	
2021	Rumah Madu Ku Berhantu	P. I. Dino	
2022	Nasi Lemak 1.0	Chief Pirate	
2022	Hantu Kuat Ketawa	Amirul	
2022	Jaga-Jaga Senariounion	Saiful	
2022	Hantu Tenggek	Tuan Sidek	
2023	Sumpahan Syaitan	Adam	
2023	Satu Hari Sebelum Raya	Uncle	Special appearance
2023	Sumpahan Malam Raya	Wak Sarip	Special appearance
2025	Bukan Hantu Biashe Biashe	Coach Buster	
2025	6 Jilake	Nagasari	

=== Television ===
Year	Title	Role	TV channel
1994	Sinaran Pasport Kegemilangan	Participant	TV3
1998–2004	Senario		TV3
1998–1999	Melodi	Host	TV3
1999	Senario In Person	Guest	TV3
2006–2007	Gitu-Gitu Apek	Apek	Astro Ria
2009–2010	Jangan Tidur Lagi	Host	TV3
2011	Zizan Show	Guest	Astro Warna
2011–2012	Maharaja Lawak	Permanent judges	Astro Warna
2013	Raja Lawak Astro (Season 7)	Permanent judges	Astro Warna
2016–2017	Lawak Solo	Permanent judges	Astro Warna
2017	Konsert Komedi	Himself - Week 7 (Senario Reunion)	Astro Warna
2017	Lawak Ke Der Tak Coverline	Guest	Astro Warna
2018	Di Balik Tawa (Season 1)	Guest	Astro Warna
2018	Bintang Bersama Bintang (Season 2)	Permanent judges	TV3
2020–2021	Tok Kata	Host	Awesome TV
2021	Gegar Vaganza (Season 8)	Participant	Astro Ria
2023	Kampung Senariuh	Apek	Awesome TV

=== Television series ===
Year	Title	Role	TV channel	Notes
2003	Phua Chu Kang Pte Ltd (Season 6)	Himself	Channel 5	Episode: "Worst Case Senario"
2006	Ejen 016	Ejen 016	TV3	
2011–2012	S.Y.O.K		TV1	
2011–2013	Edisi Khas		TV3	
2021	Yo Lah Tu!		TV9	
2022	Senduk Swap		TA-DAA!	

=== Telemovie ===
Year	Title	Role	TV channel	Notes
2002	O.K	Lim Tem Pek / Saiful	VCD	Also as director, screenwriter and executive producer
2003	Champion	Sood	VCD	
2003	Qudut & Qatik	Qudut	VCD	As director
2003	Jadi Tak Jadi	Along	VCD	
2003	Apa Nak Dikata?	Azmi	VCD	
2003	Siapa Tak Sayang Bini 1 & 2	Saiful	VCD	
2003	Neon	Weird Man	VCD	
2003	Pelakon Popular	Himself	VCD	
2004	Hero Yang Terlampau		VCD	
2006	Gitu-Gitu Apek Aidilfitri		Astro Ria	
2011	Hantu Susu	Jinggo	Astro Ria	
2011	Sudu & Garfu	Rosli	TV3	
2016	Last Kopek Havoc	Taiko San	DVD	
2017	Gitu-Gitu Raya		Astro Raya HD	
2021	Kampong Bharu	Yusoff	TV2	
2022	Sejenis Raya Senariounion	Saiful	Astro Warna	
2023	Monsun Barat, Angin Selatan	Pak Din	TV1	

== Discography ==
=== Single ===
- Saiful Apek & Famili - Kalakian - (2009; featuring. Diarra)
- Saiful Apek & Famili - Hua Hua Hua - (2009)
- Pak Pung - (2013; Isma AF7 & featuring. Altimet)
- Bangkit! - (2025; Nik Qistina & featuring. YBJ)

== Awards and nominations ==
Year	Awards	Category	Result
2003	Anugerah Bintang Popular Berita Harian 2003	Most Popular Star; Popular Male TV Actors	Both Wons
2006	Anugerah Bintang Popular Berita Harian 2006	Popular Male Film Actors	Won
2007	Anugerah Bintang Popular Berita Harian 2007	Popular Male Film Actors	Top 5
2008	Anugerah Bintang Popular Berita Harian 2008	Popular Male Film Actors	Top 5
2021	Anugerah Ikon Komedi Malaysia 2021	Open Award	Won
2024	Anugerah Bintang Popular Berita Harian 2024	Most Popular Comedy Artist (with Senario)	Won
