= List of Malaysian films of 2008 =

This is a list of Malaysian films produced and released in 2008. Most of the film are produced in the Malay language, but there also a significant number of films that are produced in English, Mandarin, Cantonese, Hokkien and Tamil.

== 2008 ==
=== January – March ===
Opening		Title	Director	Cast	Genre	Notes	Ref.
J A N U A R Y	10	Jarum Halus	Mark Tan	Christien New, Juliana Ibrahim, Razif Hashim, Rahim Razali, Farah Putri, Justin Chan, Megat Sharizal	Drama / Thriller	Adaptation of William Shakespeare's play Othello	
J A N U A R Y	10	Kala Malam Bulan Mengambang	Mamat Khalid	Rosyam Nor, Umie Aida, Kuswadinata, Corrien Adrienne, Avaa Vanjaa, Bront Palarae, Farid Kamil	Horror / Comedy	Tayangan Unggul	
J A N U A R Y	24	Cuci	Hans Isaac	Awie, Afdlin Shauki, AC Mizal, Hans Isaac, Erra Fazira, Khir Rahman, Harun Salim Bachik, Umie Aida, Rahim Razali, Yusni Jaafar	Comedy		
F E B R U A R Y	7	Dunia Baru The Movie	M. Hitler Zami	Pierre Andre, Elyana, Anita Baharom, Ellyas Abdullah, Baizura Kahar, Ngasriah Ngasri, Iqram Dinzly, Almy Nadia, Mohd Hafiz Nafiah, Ridzuan Hashim, Rozita Che Wan	Drama / Comedy	Grand Brilliance	
F E B R U A R Y	21	Anak	Barney Lee	Erra Fazira, Ida Nerina	Horror		
M A R C H	6	Duyung	Abdul Razak Mohaideen	Maya Karin, Saiful Apek, Awie, Yassin Yahya, Yasmin Hani, Raja Noor Baizura, Abu Bakar Omar, Hafidzuddin Fazil, Rosnah Mat Aris, Iqbal Mydin, Azhari Mohd Zain	Romance / Comedy / Fantasy	KRU Studios, Grand Brilliance, Lineclear Motion Pictures	
M A R C H	20	Akhirat	S. Baldev Singh	Nabila Huda, Vanida Imran, Tony Eusoff	Drama / Romance		

=== April – June ===
Opening		Title	Director	Cast	Genre	Notes	Ref.
A P R I L	3	Evolusi KL Drift	Syamsul Yusof	Syamsul Yusof, Aaron Aziz, Farid Kamil, Fasha Sandha, Iqram Dinzly, Diana Danielle, Buzen Hashim, Rizal Ashraf, Xy, Hetty Sarlene, Nurhuda Mohd Ali, Mohd Shahril	Action	Skop Productions, Grand Brilliance	
A P R I L	17	Congkak	Ahmad Idham	Nanu Baharuddin, Riezman Khuzaimi, M. Rajoli, Erin Malek, Erynne Erynna, Ruminah Sidek	Horror		
M A Y	1	Cinta U-Turn	Abdul Razak Mohaideen	Awie, Fasha Sandha, Mazlan Pet Pet, Abu Bakar Omar, Jalaluddin Hassan, Azlee Jaafar, Fiza Elite	Comedy / Romance		
M A Y	29	Apa Kata Hati?	Saw Teong Hin	Raja Farah, Farid Kamil, Awal Ashaari, Dynas Mokhtar, Awie, Kartina Aziz, Fauziah Ahmad Daud, Harun Salim Bachik, AC Mizal, Vanida Imran, Adlin Aman Ramlie	Comedy / Romance	Tayangan Unggul	
J U N E	12	Pensil	M. Subash Abdullah	M. Subash Abdullah, Ruminah Sidek, Maimon Mutalib	Drama		
J U N E	26	Sepi	Kabir Bhatia	Afdlin Shauki, Vanida Imran, Nasha Aziz, Tony Eusoff, Eja, Riezman Khuzaimi, Baizura Kahar, Sein Ruffedge, Pierre Andre, Eizlan Yusof, Rozita Che Wan	Drama / Romance	Grand Brilliance	

=== July – September ===
Opening		Title	Director	Cast	Genre	Notes	Ref.
J U L Y	24	I'm Not Single	Pierre Andre	Awal Ashaari, Farid Kamil, Lisa Surihani, Ahmad Idham, Intan Ladyana	Comedy / Romance		
A U G U S T	7	Susuk	Amir Muhammad, Naeim Ghalili	Ida Nerina, Sofea Jane, Noorkhiriah, Diana Rafar, Adlin Aman Ramlie, Aleeza Kassim, Hairie Othman	Thriller / Horror / Mystery	Grand Brilliance	
S E P T E M B E R	9	Block B	Chris Chong Chan Fui		Experimental short	Canadian co-production	
S E P T E M B E R	25	Punggok Rindukan Bulan	Azharr Rudin	Saeful Nazhif Satria, Sahronizam Noor, Maya Karin, Salehuddin Abu Bakar, Sharifah Amani	Drama	Da Huang Pictures	

=== October – December ===
Opening		Title	Director	Cast	Genre	Notes	Ref.
O C T O B E R	1	Kami The Movie	Effendee Mazlan, Fariza Azlina Isahak	Liyana Jasmay, Syarul Ezani, Nas-T, Juliana Evans, Zeyna, Zahiril Adzim	Drama / Teen	Red Films, Grand Brilliance	
O C T O B E R	1	Senario The Movie: Episode 1	Ahmad Idham	Lan Pet Pet, Azlee Jaafar, Wahid Mohamed, Eizlan Yusof	Action / Comedy	MIG Production; Preceded by Senario The Movie (1999) Senario Lagi (2000), Lagi-Lagi Senario (2001), Lang Buana (2003), Senario XX (2005), Senario Pemburu Emas Yamashita (2006)	
O C T O B E R	16	Tipu Kanan Tipu Kiri	Sharad Sharan	Christian Sugiono, Titi Kamal, Hans Isaac, Natasha Hudson, R. Madhavan	Comedy		
O C T O B E R	30	Budak Kelantan	Wan Azli	Danny, Bienda, Mohd Asrulfaizal, Along Eyzendy	Drama		
N O V E M B E R	13	Wayang	Hatta Azad Khan	Eman Manan, Zul Huzaimy, Mas Muharni	Drama / Art		
N O V E M B E R	20	Selamat Pagi Cinta	Yana Samsudin	Pierre Andre, Que Haidar, Sharifah Amani, Fazura	Romance / Drama	MIG Production	
N O V E M B E R	27	Antoo Fighter	Azizi "Chunk" Adnan	Awie, Radhi, Harun Salim Bachik, Bront Palarae	Horror / Comedy	Grand Brilliance	
D E C E M B E R	4	Los dan Faun	Afdlin Shauki	Hans Isaac, Adlin Aman Ramlie, Erra Fazira, AC Mizal, Ida Nerina, Afdlin Shauki, Stephen Rahman Hughes	Action / Comedy		
D E C E M B E R	4	Kinta 1881	C.L. Hor	Robin Ho, David Bao, Michael Chin, Shawn Lee	Action / Martial Arts	Cantonese-language film	
D E C E M B E R	11	Cicak Man 2: Planet Hitam	Yusry Abdul Halim	Fasha Sandha, Saiful Apek, AC Mizal, Ridzuan Hashim, Adlin Aman Ramlie, Aznil Nawawi	Comedy / Action	KRU Studios, Grand Brilliance Preceded by Cicak Man (2006)	
D E C E M B E R	18	Histeria	James Lee	Liyana Jasmay, Scha Alyahya, Yana Samsudin, Talya, Norisnainy, Adlin Aman Ramlie, Namron, Vanida Imran	Horror	Tayangan Unggul	
D E C E M B E R	25	Brainscan: Aku dan Topi Ajaib	Ahmad Idham	Sharifah Shahira, Nik Adruce	Adventure / Comedy / Science Fiction	MIG Production	

== See also ==
- 2008 in Malaysia
