= List of Malaysian films of 2015 =

This is a list of Malaysian films produced and released in 2015. Most of the film are produced in the Malay language, but there also a significant number of films that are produced in English, Mandarin, Cantonese and Tamil.

== 2015 ==
=== January – March ===
Opening		Title	Director	Cast	Genre	Notes	Ref.
J A N U A R Y	1	Rumah Pusaka Di Simpang Jalan	Mamat Khalid	Pekin Ibrahim, Bell Ngasri, Jihan Muse, Rab Khalid, Ahmad Maembong, Shuk Balas	Horror / Comedy / Family	Ariabella	
J A N U A R Y	1	Pinnokam	Hamen Kumar	Hamen Kumar, Anu Ramamoorthy, Aghonderan Sahadevan II, Surenderaj Yuvaraj, Murali Raj, Shree, Jessie	Action / Romance	D'Cinema; Tamil-language film	
J A N U A R Y	8	Romeo Kota: Kes Fail Kriptik	Aaron Aziz	Aaron Aziz, Nabil Ahmad, Hanis Zalikha, Sofi Jikan, Fizo Omar, Wan Sharmila	Action / Comedy	Excellent Pictures	
J A N U A R Y	15	Villa Nabila	Syafiq Yusof	Tisha Shamsir, Pekin Ibrahim, Hisyam Hamid	Horror	Skop Productions / Viper Studios	
J A N U A R Y	22	Suamiku, Encik Perfect 10!	Feroz Kader	Aaron Aziz, Lisa Surihani, Syazwan Zulkifli, Raja Ilya, Jasmin Hamid	Comedy / Drama / Family	Astro Shaw	
J A N U A R Y	29	Puaka Balai Gombak	Wan Mohd Hafiz Wan Hussein	Hazwan As'ari, Shukri Mohd Tahir	Horror	Showbiz Productions	
F E B R U A R Y	5	My Mr. Right	Yoko Chou	Lin Mei-Hsiu, Tou Chung-Hua, Chen Wei-Min, Amber Chia, Wilson Tan	Comedy / Romance	Shining Production; Mandarin-language film	
F E B R U A R Y	5	Bangunan	Khir Rahman	Khir Rahman, Aqasha, Sein Qudsi, Amir Musa, Wan Shahidi, Yusran Hashim	Horror	Excellent Pictures	
F E B R U A R Y	12	The Dream Boyz	Ryon Lee	Alvin Chong, Eric Lin, Fuying, Sam, Rayz Lim, Teddy Chin	Comedy / Drama / Romance	Shining Production; Mandarin-language film	
F E B R U A R Y	12	Gudang Kubur	Eyra Rahman	Faizal Hussein, Nora Danish, Atikah Suhaimie, Nizam Zaidi, Epy Kodiang	Horror	Mangkin Prestij	
F E B R U A R Y	19	My Papa Rich	Ryon Lee	Wang Lei, Jack Neo, Teddy Chin, Mindee Ong	Comedy	Film Kingdom Group; Mandarin-language film	
F E B R U A R Y	19	Coverina	Khalid Nadzri	Pekin Ibrahim, Siti Elizad, Cat Farish	Action	SPS Jaya	
F E B R U A R Y	26	Kungfu Taboo	Euho	Kara Wai, Henry Thia, Frederick Lee, Miau Miau, January So	Comedy	Asia Tropical Films; Mandarin-language film	
F E B R U A R Y	26	Sunti @ Facebook	James Lee	Izzue Islam, Fouziah Gous, Lufya Omar, Jenny Cotez, Syazwan Zulkifli, Anas Mentor, Diddy Hirdy, Arief Farhan	Horror	Nusantara Seni Karya	
M A R C H	5	Kepong Gangster 2	Teng Bee	Henley Hii, Billy Ng, Crystal Lee, Agnes Lim, Danny One, Eric Lin	Action / Crime / Drama	Mahu Pictures; Mandarin-language film	
M A R C H	5	Usop Wilcha dalam Werewolf dari Bangladesh	Mamat Khalid	Zizan Razak, Emma Maembong, Usop Wilcha, Saiful Apek, Rab Khalid	Horror / Action / Comedy	Ariabella; A spin-off the Kampung Pisang franchise	
M A R C H	12	Zombies vs The Lucky Exorcist	Jaguar Lim	Alvin Wong, Lai Meng, Henry Thia, Hidy Yu, Jaguar Lim	Comedy / Drama	Jaguar Lim Films; Mandarin-language film	
M A R C H	12	Cicak Man 3	Yusry Abdul Halim	Zizan Razak, Lisa Surihani, Fizz Fairuz, Bell Ngasri, Yus Jambu, Adam Corrie	Action / Comedy	KRU Studios; Preceded by Cicak Man (2006) and Cicak Man 2: Planet Hitam (2008)	
M A R C H	19	Isyarat Cinta	Badaruddin Azmi	Liyana Jasmay, Adi Putra, Fizo Omar	Romance	Suhan Movies	
M A R C H	26	Jengka	Aziz M. Osman	Riezman Khuzaimi, Ramona Zam Zam, Raja Azrey	Horror	Ace Motion Pictures	

=== April – June ===
Opening		Title	Director	Cast	Genre	Notes	Ref.
A P R I L	9	Hantu Bungkus Ikat Tepi	Hashim Rejab	Tauke Jambu, Yus Jambu, Abam Bocey, Nora Danish, Farid Kamil, Zalif Sidek, Pablo Amirul	Horror / Comedy	MIG Pictures	
A P R I L	16	Abang Lejen	Azaromi Ghozali	Farid Kamil, Fadlan Hazim, Intan Ladyana, Adibah Yunus, Hamid Gurkha, Along Eyzendy	Action	Mangkin Prestij	
A P R I L	16	Agileswari	Roy Krishnan	Jeeva Uthaya, Vikneswary	Horror / Crime	RM Vision Film Production; Tamil-language film	
A P R I L	23	Selfie Suara Kubur	M. Subash Abdullah	Mak Jah, Kay Shan, Aiza, Sue, Adie Black	Horror / Crime / Drama	Genius Parade	
A P R I L	23	Avana Nee	Logaruban Loganathan	Logaruban Loganathan, Vithya Perumal, Ashwin Kaur, Rai Jacintha, Krishnamurthy Rameshwara, Sures Kumar@VSK Thinaharan, Nilasyah Rebecca. Guna, Sara Roshan, Tashmaishree	Comedy	D'Cinema; Tamil-language film	
A P R I L	30	Pilot Cafe	Osman Ali	Fahrin Ahmad, Izara Aishah, Neelofa, Remy Ishak, Keith Foo, Eizlan Yusof, Dian P. Ramlee, Rosnah Johari, Zaidi Omar, Hafizzudin Fadzi	Drama / Romance	Astro Shaw / Tarantela Pictures	
A P R I L	30	Road of Enlightenment	Lai Kim Moon	Michael Liew, Crystal Ong, Darren Tung, Wilson Tin, Brendan Yuen	Crime / Drama	Cao Min Pictures; Mandarin-language film	
M A Y	7	Jalan Puncak Alam	Dharma Aizat	Azwan Kombos, Epy Kodiang, Shafiez, Nizam Zaidi	Horror	Mangkin Prestij	
M A Y	7	KID	Praboo Ariva	Jarrel Yeo, Shashi Anbah, Arun Chandran, Sarankumar, Kesavan Krishnamurthi	Crime	Fenomena Seni Produksi; Tamil-language film	
M A Y	14	Suami Aku Ustaz	Ghaz Abu Bakar	Adi Putra, Nora Danish, Izzue Islam, Betty Rahmat	Drama / Romance	Karyaseni Production	
M A Y	21	Jendela	M. Subash Abdullah	Ruminah Sidek	Family / Mystery	Genius Parade	
M A Y	21	Dia	M. Jamil, Rizal Halim	M. Jamil, Mayumi Kasuga, Sofea Shaheera, Zamil Sadiq, Amirulshah Rozali	Horror / Mystery	Galaksi Seni	
M A Y	28	Oh! La La	Abdul Rahman Sallehuddin	Syed Atiq, Nur Nazliah, Mohd Juhan	Animation / Musical	Infinite Motion	
M A Y	28	Gamatisme	Yeop Hitler	Syazwan Zulkifli, Nabila Huda, Adeline Tsen	Horror	Pencil Pictures	
J U N E	4	Wira Wah	Lee Lik-Chi, Brando Lee	Auguste Kwan, Mimi Chu, Crystal Lee, Dato' Lai Meng, Cathryn Lee, Michael Tong	Comedy	12 B Mandarin-language film	
J U N E	4	Darah Panas	Arjinder Singh	Sharnaaz Ahmad, Sofi Jikan, Nur Fathia, Adam Corrie, Jalaluddin Hassan	Action / Romance	White Merpati Entertainment	
J U N E	11	Love Endures	Jovi Theng	Liu Kai Chi, Emily Kong, Jovi Theng	Family / Romance	Kingdom Works; Mandarin-language film	
J U N E	18	Papa's Shoe	M. Subash Abdullah	Veron Lin	Drama / Family	Genius Parade; Mandarin-language film	
J U N E	25	Hold Me Tight	Ivy Too	Remon Lim, Jazz Bai Lin, Yap Chin Fong, Wong Kam Tat	Drama	Mahligai Masyhur; Mandarin-language film	

=== July – September ===
Opening		Title	Director	Cast	Genre	Notes	Ref.
J U L Y	2	Vere Vazhi Ille	M. S. Prem Nath	Denes Kumar, Jasmine Micheal, Kristina Vinokree	Horror / Comedy	Veedu Production; Tamil-language film	
J U L Y	2	Courage to Dream	David Liew	Koo Seow Choo, Lee Kwai Ying, Lee Yuen Yee, Wong Ker Fong	Family / Romance	Mahligai Masyhur; Mandarin-language film	
J U L Y	17	Suamiku Jatuh dari Langit	Eyra Rahman	Qi Razali, Nora Danish, Shuk SYJ, Atikah Suhaimie	Comedy	MIG Pictures	
J U L Y	17	Gangsterock: Kasi Sengat	Sofi Jikan	Saiful Apek, Sofi Jikan, Izara Aishah, Aqasha, Khir Rahman, Sharifah Amani, Julia Ziegler, Syafie Naswip	Action / Drama	YKS Film Maker	
J U L Y	30	CCTV	Daven R.	Aeril Zafrel, Hasnul Rahmat, Ardel Aryana, Jeff Omar	Horror	Cinemaya Studios	
A U G U S T	6	Ciliwung, Gudnite	Dede Ferdinan	Maria Farida, Dewi Amanda, Rya Nightingale, Ferly Putra	Horror / Drama / Romance	Sheunik	
A U G U S T	13	Nota	Yasu Tanaka	Hans Isaac, Maya Karin, Ramli Hassan, Rin Izzumi	Crime / Drama / Mystery	42nd Pictures	
A U G U S T	20	Misi Rayyan dan Danish: Jangan Ambil Rumah Kami	Azaromi Ghozali	Intan Ladyana, Azwan Kombos, Hanif Safuan, Sharisa Haris	Comedy	Mangkin Prestij	
A U G U S T	20	The Noise	Adrian Teh	Adrian Teh, Lenna Lim, Phoebe Huang	Mystery / Romance	Asia Tropical Films; Mandarin-language film	
A U G U S T	27	Jejak Warriors	Saw Teong Hin	Pekin Ibrahim, Nadiya Nisaa, Alif Firdaus, Harun Salim Bachik, Fauziah Ahmad Daud, Bell Ngasri, Sabri Yunus, Khairul Fahmi Che Mat, Amir Raja Lawak, Shuk SYJ	Family	U2 Media	
S E P T E M B E R	3	Usop Wilcha: Menghonjang Makhluk Muzium	Mamat Khalid	Usop Wilcha, Elizabeth Tan, Nasir Bilal Khan, Namron, Hitler Zami, Kamarol Yusof	Horror / Comedy / Fantasy	Mounting Board Productions	
S E P T E M B E R	10	Bravo 5	Yeop Hitler Zami & Fauzi Nawawi	Beto Kusyairy, Remy Ishak, Shashi Tharan, Xavier Fong, Frank Peterson, Sofi Jikan, Hattan, Fizz Fairuz, Zul Huzaimy, Kamal Adli, Adam Corrie	Action	Karya Firma Production	
S E P T E M B E R	10	Tortured Souls	M. Subash Abdullah	Yuki, Edmond, Francis Chong	Family / Mystery	Dream Pix Media; Mandarin-language film	
S E P T E M B E R	17	Kapsul	Martias Ali	Faizal Hussein, Rahim Razali, Kamarul Hassan, Adlin Aman Ramlie, Joey Daud, Jue Aziz, Haerianto Hassan, Harun Salim Bachik, Ahmad Tarmimi Siregar, Adam Corrie	Fiction	Two Tones	
S E P T E M B E R	17	Polis Evo	Ghaz Abu Bakar	Shaheizy Sam, Zizan Razak, Nora Danish, Mimie Ernida, Wan Hanafi Su, Pablo Amirul, Amerul Affendy, Harun Salim Bachik	Action / Comedy / Crime	Astro Shaw	
S E P T E M B E R	24	Girlfriend Kontrak	Virginia Kennedy	Keith Foo, Nur Risteena, Azad Jazmin, Bront Palarae, Fara Fauzana	Drama / Romance	Primeworks Studios	
S E P T E M B E R	24	Jwanita	Osman Ali	Maya Karin, Bront Palarae, Cristina Suzanne Stockstill, Marsha Milan Londoh, Umie Aida	Horror	Nuansa	

=== October – December ===
Opening		Title	Director	Cast	Genre	Notes	Ref.
O C T O B E R	1	Pontianak Menangis	Ismail Jejaka	Rahim R2, Yassin, Hamdan Senario	Horror	Heart N Soul	
O C T O B E R	8	Rembat	Shamly Othman	Shaheizy Sam, Aniu, Zizan Razak, Zara Zya, Sam Chong, Arja Lee	Action / Comedy	Marna Films Grand Brilliance Red Films	
O C T O B E R	8	Maravan	SD Puvanendran	Kumaresh, Haridass, Denes Kumar, Kavitha Thiagarajan, Logan, Seelan, Pushpa Narayan, Sangeeta Krishnasamy	Action / Drama / Family / Thriller	Golden Peacock Film Production; Tamil language movie	
O C T O B E R	15	Badi	Eyra Rahman	Adibah Yunus, Azwan Kombos, Rashidah Jaafar	Horror	MIG Pictures	
O C T O B E R	15	Death Trip	Billy Tang	Victor Wong, Zeng Yong Xing, Chan Chee Hong	Horror / Crime / Mystery	Asia Tropical Films; Mandarin-language film	
O C T O B E R	22	Love, Supermoon	Wan Hasliza	Nadiya Nisaa, Farid Kamil, Rita Rudaini, Anne Ngasri, Fizz Fairuz, Zain Saidin	Comedy / Drama	Grand Brilliance	
O C T O B E R	22	Muthukumar Wanted	M. Pathmanaban	Sarran SK, Nazira Ibrahim, Haridass, Robo Shankar	Romance / Action	MERP Film Factory; Tamil-language film	
O C T O B E R	29	Juvana 2: Terperangkap Dalam Kebebasan	Faisal Ishak	Johan As'ari, Zahiril Adzim, Shera Aiyob, Pekin Ibrahim, Hasnul Rahmat	Action	Filmscape; Preceded by Juvana (2013)	
O C T O B E R	29	Iravan	Kash Villanz	Kash Villanz, K.S Maniam, Darkkey, Devika Raghavakrishnan, Maney Villanz	Action / Family / Romance / Musical	DVA Film Productions	
N O V E M B E R	5	Mirip	Jokin	Fezrul Khan, Ezzaty Abdullah, Reen Rahim	Musical / Romance / Thriller	Green Screen Production	
N O V E M B E R	12	Biasan	Sandosh Kesavan	Mas Khan, Lana Nordin, Jalaluddin Hassan, Emma Akan	Romance	Janu Talkies	
N O V E M B E R	12	Find My Dad	Euho	Victor Wong, Jeanette Aw, Ha Yu, Mini Bin	Drama / Family / Romance	Asia Tropical Films	
N O V E M B E R	19	Ada Apa Dekat Bus Stop	Ikhzal Azfarel Ideris	Abam Bocey, Tauke Jambu, Leez AF, Meor Oh Chentaku, Airis Yasmin, Kazar, Zaibo, Erwan Razak	Comedy	Katak Hijau Entertainment	
N O V E M B E R	26	Banglo Berkunci	Dharma Aizat	Nur Fathiah Diaz, Adibah Yunus, Fadlan Hazim, Sheikh Zulhamy Reza, Intan Ladyana	Horror	Mangkin Prestij	
N O V E M B E R	26	Sinaran	Osman Ali	Lisa Surihani, Evan Sanders, Izara Aishah, Syarif Sleeq, Nadiah M.Din, Sheila Majid	Musical	Nuansa-Shooting Gallery Asia-Sinaran Pictures co-production	
D E C E M B E R	3	Chowrasta	Abdul Razak Mohaideen	Cheem Ammar, Nora Danish, Rosyam Nor, Fauzi Nawawi	Romance / Action / Comedy / Drama	Nation Film Studio	
D E C E M B E R	3	Paint My Love	Jen B	Sam, Fuying, Ribbon Ooi, Eric Lin	Drama	Mahu Pictures; Mandarin-language film	
D E C E M B E R	10	Keranda Tok Wan Terbang	Hashim Rejab	Yassin Yahya, Rahim R2, Shuk SYJ, Shima Anuar, Mak Jah, Epy Kodiang	Horror / Comedy	MIG Pictures	
D E C E M B E R	10	Who's Your Daddy	Boris Boo	Tedd Chan, Luke Lok, Jeanna Ho Pui Yu, Chelsia Ng	Comedy / Drama / Family	Double Vision; Mandarin-language film	
D E C E M B E R	17	Nanchathiran			Drama / Family	Dream Pix Media; Tamil-language film	
D E C E M B E R	17	Jagat	Shanjhey Kumar Perumal	Jibrail Rajhula, Harvind Raj, Kuben Mahadevan, Aahmuu Thirunyanam	Action / Crime / Drama	Skyzen; Tamil-language film	
D E C E M B E R	24	Mat Moto	Ahmad Idham	Niezam Zaidi, Shenthy Feliziana, Along Eyzendy, Qaralyana	Action / Comedy	SPSI Jaya	
D E C E M B E R	24	Isteri untuk Dijual	Eyra Rahman	Kamal Adli, Nora Danish, Azwan Kombos	Romance	Mangkin Prestij	
D E C E M B E R	31	Apartment	Pierre Andre	Kamal Adli, Naqia Nasution, Bil Azali	Horror	Rainfilm	
