= List of Malaysian films of 2011 =

This is a list of Malaysian films produced and released in 2011. Most of the film are produced in the Malay language, but there also a significant number of films that are produced in English, Mandarin, Cantonese, Hokkien and Tamil.

== 2011 ==
=== January – March ===
Opening		Title	Director	Cast	Genre	Notes	Ref.
J A N U A R Y	13	Khurafat	Syamsul Yusof	Syamsul Yusof, Liyana Jasmay, Sabrina Ali, Salina Saibi, Zendy, Fauziah Nawi, Nur Huda, Mariani, Latif Borgiba, Along Eyzendy	Horror	Skop Productions Grand Brilliance	
J A N U A R Y	13	Great Day	Chiu Keng Guan	Jack Lim, Wan Wai Fun, Vivian, Jiang Han, Royce Tan	Comedy / Drama	Cantonese-language film	
J A N U A R Y	27	HAQ	C.L. Hor, Jumaatun Azmi	Zul Huzaimy, Adi Putra, Nanu Baharuddin, Raja Farah	Action / Drama		
F E B R U A R Y	10	Sini Ada Hantu	James Lee	Alvin Wong, Baki Zainal, Mano Maniam, Eira Syazira, Kuswadinata, Fasha Sandha, Patrick Teoh, Pete Teo, Ramasundram	Horror / Mystery / Thriller	Astro Shaw	
F E B R U A R Y	24	Kembar Siang	Hatta Azad Khan	Kamal Adli, Intan Ladyana, Mat Over, Zul Handyblack, Zaibo, Rozita Che Wan, Lan Pet Pet, Sabri Yunus	Comedy	Metrowealth Pictures	
M A R C H	10	Hikayat Merong Mahawangsa	Yusry Abdul Halim	Stephen Rahman Hughes, Khir Rahman, Ummi Nazeera, Jehan Miskin, Jing Lu, Deborah Henry, Umie Aida	Historical / Action / Epic / War	KRU Studios	
M A R C H	17	Ratu The Movie	Abdul Razak Mohaideen	Eizlan Yusof, Fouziah Ghous, Yusry Abdul Halim, Azlee Khairi, Zaibo, Aminah Rhapor, Cico Harahap	Adventure / Drama / Mystery	Lineclear Motion Pictures	
M A R C H	24	...Dalam Botol	Khir Rahman	Arja Lee, Wan Raja, Fauziah Ahmad Daud, Diana Danielle	Drama		
M A R C H	31	Cun	Osman Ali	Remy Ishak, Maya Karin, Ning Baizura, Jehan Miskin	Comedy / Family / Romance	Tayangan Unggul	

=== April – June ===
Opening		Title	Director	Cast	Genre	Notes	Ref.
A P R I L	7	Dilarang Masuk	Jeffrey Chan	Shiqin Kamal, Azma Aizal Yusoof, Muniff Isa, Isma Hanum Husein, Esma Daniel	Thriller / Horror		
A P R I L	14	Senjakala	Ahmad Idham	Zahiril Adzim, Liyana Jasmay, Faezah Elai, Aida Aris, Ruminah Sidek, Kamal Adli	Horror	Excellent Pictures	
A P R I L	21	Penunggu Istana	Wan Hasliza	Siti Nadhirah Mohd Zain (Adeek), Sara Ali, Nor Zafirah Abd Rahim, Amar Asyraf Zailuddin	Horror	Grand Brilliance Primeworks Studios	
A P R I L	28	Seru	Pierre Andre, Ming Jin	Pierre Andre, Nora Danish, Awal Ashaari, Cut Mutia, Azman Hassan, Sharnaaz Ahmad, Nisha Dirr	Horror / Mystery / Thriller	Tayangan Unggul	
M A Y	5	Momok Jangan Panggil Aku	M. Jamil	M. Jamil, Cassandra Patrick, Ariff S. Shamsuddin, Zarina Zainuddin	Horror		
M A Y	12	Kongsi	Farid Kamil	Fizo Omar, Shaheizy Sam, Zul Handyblack, Azad Jasmin, Putri Mardiana, Fida, Yana Samsudin	Action / Comedy	Metrowealth Pictures	
M A Y	19	Nur Kasih The Movie	Kabir Bhatia	Remy Ishak, Tiz Zaqyah, Fizz Fairuz	Drama	Grand Brilliance, Juita Videi Filmspace	
M A Y	26	Karak	Yusry Abdul Halim	Shera Aiyob, Shahir Zawawi, Kilafairy, Along Eyzendy	Horror/ Thriller	KRU Studios	
J U N E	2	Toyol Nakal		Joey Exist, Julia Ziegler, Aaron Frando, Abon, Mr. Os, Mimi M. Borhan	Comedy / Drama		
J U N E	9	KL Gangster	Syamsul Yusof	Aaron Aziz, Adi Putra, Syamsul Yusof, Ridzuan Hashim, Sofi Jikan, Zizan Razak	Action		
J U N E	16	3 2 1 Cinta	Azhari Mohd Zain	Farid Kamil, Diana Amir, Pierre Andre	Romance / Comedy		
J U N E	23	Rasuk	S. Baldev Singh	Fouziah Ghous, Iqram Dinzly, Sidek Hussain, Fauziah Nawi, Khir Mohd Noor	Horror / Thriller	White Mapert Entertainment	
J U N E	30	Sekali Lagi	Hashim Rejab	Shaheizy Sam, Mia Sara Nasuha, Lisa Surihani, Bront Palarae	Romance	Metrowealth Pictures	

=== July – September ===
Opening		Title	Director	Cast	Genre	Notes	Ref.
J U L Y	7	Tolong Awek Aku Pontianak	James Lee	Zahiril Adzim, Sazzy Falak, Liyana Jasmay, Afdlin Shauki, Nurul Wahab, Jehan Miskin, Harun Salim Bachik	Horror / Comedy / Romance	Tayangan Unggul	
J U L Y	14	Flat 3A	Azhari Mohd Zain	Intan Ladyana, Ery Zukhairi, Shasha	Horror	Metrowealth Pictures	
J U L Y	21	Senario The Movie: Ops Pocot	Ismail Bob Hasim	Azlee Jaafar, Lan Pet Pet, Wahid Mohamed, Diana Amir, Mas Muharni, Kamal Adli	Comedy	Metrowealth Pictures; Preceded by Senario The Movie (1999) Senario Lagi (2000), Lagi-Lagi Senario (2001), Lang Buana (2003) Senario XX (2005) Senario Pemburu Emas Yamashita (2006), Senario The Movie: Episod 1 (2008) Senario The Movie Episod 2: Beach Boys (2009), Senario Asam Garam (2010)	
A U G U S T	31	Karipap-Karipap Cinta	Othman Hafsham	Gambit Saifullah, Melia Aimellia, Eman Manan	Comedy / Romance		
A U G U S T	31	Hantu Bonceng	Ahmad Idham	Zizan Razak, Juliana Evans, Jue Aziz, Sallehudin (Tai)	Horror / Comedy	Excellent Pictures	
S E P T E M B E R	8	Nasi Lemak 2.0	Namewee	Namewee, Adibah Noor, Afdlin Shauki, Karen Kong, Felixia Yeap, David Arumugam, Denise Lau, Nur Fathia, Ho Yuhang, Pete Teo	Comedy / Drama	Mandarin-Cantonese-Malay-language film	
S E P T E M B E R	15	Raya Tak Jadi	Abdul Razak Mohaideen	Saiful Apek, Johan Raja Lawak, Jalaluddin Hassan, Wan Sharmila	Comedy / Family	Grand Brilliance, Lineclear Motion Pictures	
S E P T E M B E R	22	Bini-Biniku Gangster	Ismail Bob Hasim	Shaheizy Sam, Intan Ladyana, Yana Samsudin, Zul Handyblack	Action / Comedy	Metrowealth Pictures	
S E P T E M B E R	29	Libas	Jurey Latiff Rosli	Rosyam Nor, Johan, Scha Alyahya, Beego, Fadzly Kamarulzaman	Action / Comedy		

=== October – December ===
Opening		Title	Director	Cast	Genre	Notes	Ref.
O C T O B E R	6	Al-Hijab	Pierre Andre	Pierre Andre, Maimon Mutalib, Aziz M. Osman, Nur Fathia, Pekin Ibrahim	Horror		
O C T O B E R	13	Klip 3GP	Aidilfitri Mohd Yunus	Zahiril Adzim, Sara Ali, Mimie, Adeline Anthony, Amanda Misbun, Fikhree Abu Bakar	Thriller / Drama / Horror / Mystery	Grand Brilliance	
O C T O B E R	20	Sumpahan Puaka	Surenthar	Imuda, Mislina Mustaffa, Maimon Mutalib	Horror / Family / Mystery		
O C T O B E R	27	Apa Tengok-Tengok	Roy Krishnan	Jalaluddin Hassan, Sathiya, David Arumugam, Mahyon Ismail, Dilla Ahmad, Kuswadinata, Zulkifli Ismail	Action / Comedy / Drama / Musical		
N O V E M B E R	3	Alamak, Toyol!	Ismail Bob Hasim	Along Cham, Angah Raja Lawak, Hamid Gurkha	Horror / Comedy	Metrowealth Pictures	
N O V E M B E R	10	Abuya	Imran Ismail	Faizal Hussein, Jue Aziz, Yank Kassim, Adrea Abdullah	Action / Drama		
N O V E M B E R	17	Aku Bukan Tomboy	Syamsul Yusof	Syamsul Yusof, Scha Alyahya, Shaheizy Sam, Eira Syazira, Harun Salim Bachik	Comedy / Romance / Drama	Skop Productions	
N O V E M B E R	24	Misteri Jalan Lama	Afdlin Shauki	Que Haidar, Hans Isaac, Vanida Imran, Nasir Bilal Khan, Namron	Action / Adventure / Fantasy / Mystery / Fiction	Tayangan Unggul	
D E C E M B E R	1	Ombak Rindu	Osman Ali	Aaron Aziz, Maya Karin, Lisa Surihani, Bront Palarae	Drama / Romance	Based on the novel of the same name	
D E C E M B E R	8	Datin Ghairah	Sabree Fadzil	Aaron Aziz, Maria Farida, Hairie Othman, Faizal Hussein, Yank Kassim	Comedy / Romance		
D E C E M B E R	15	Songlap	Effendee Mazlan	Shaheizy Sam, Syafie Naswip, Sara Ali	Action / Drama / Crime	Grand Brilliance Red Films	
D E C E M B E R	22	Suatu Malam Kubur Berasap	Ernie Chen	Angah Raja Lawak, Along Cham, Azrul Cham, Ernie Chen, Nurul Ain Nordin, Zac Diamond	Horror / Comedy		
D E C E M B E R	29	Papa I Love You	Hashim Rejab	Lisa Surihani, Mia Sara Nasuha, Zalif Sidek, Zaidi Omar, Syanie, Zul Handyblack	Comedy / Drama	Metrowealth Pictures	
