= Munafik 2 =

2018 film directed by Syamsul Yusof

- Theatrical release poster (Note: There are two versions of Munafik 2 poster. The first version, features Ustaz Adam holds a tombstone with himself ablaze. The second version features Ustaz Adam standing in front of several standing zombies wrapped with white cloth. Note that the second version of this poster is intended for international release only.)
- Directed by: Syamsul Yusof
- Screenplay by: Syamsul Yusof
- Story by: Syamsul Yusof
- Produced by: Syamsul Yusof; Datuk Yusof Haslam
- Starring: Syamsul Yusof; Maya Karin; Fizz Fairuz; Mawi; Fauzi Nawawi; Nasir Bilal Khan; Rahim Razali
- Cinematography: Rahimi Mahidin
- Edited by: Syamsul Yusof
- Music by: Sky Productions; Extreme Music
- Production companies: Skop Productions; President Productions
- Distributed by: Skop Productions (Malaysia); CBI Pictures (Indonesia)
- Release dates: 30 August 2018 (Malaysia); 26 September 2018 (Indonesia)
- Running time: 100 minutes
- Country: Malaysia
- Language: Malay
- Budget: MYR 2.5 million
- Box office: MYR 48 million

Munafik 2 (English: Hypocrite 2) is a 2018 Malaysian Malay-language supernatural horror film directed and written by Syamsul Yusof. A sequel to Munafik (2016) and the second instalment in a planned Munafik trilogy, the film stars Syamsul himself, Fizz Fairuz, Maya Karin, Nasir Bilal Khan, Fauzi Nawawi, Mawi, Rahim Razali and Indonesian actress, Weni Panca.

Filming began from March to May 2017 in Kuala Lumpur, the film was released on 30 August 2018 and became commercial success, grossing RM48 million, becoming Malaysia's second highest grossing local film. The third sequel is in development with Syamsul returned to direct, wrote the screenplay and reprised his role. In December 2018, Munafik 2 was listed by the local Malaysian newspaper Harian Metro as among the top 10 local films in Malaysian history.

== Plot ==
Two years after the events of the first movie, the life of Ustaz Adam (Syamsul Yusof) was restored after being interrupted by the death of his wife and son. He becomes a preacher and continues his responsibility to help the people affected by black magic and jins. The previous tests have taught him to offer tawadhu to the Divine. But what's strange is, Adam has been constantly haunted by his past nightmares involving Maria's death. Adam is also often visited by a mysterious woman who questions him about God's Faith and destiny. Meanwhile, the village across live a Sakinah (Maya Karin) and her daughter, Aina.

Sakinah was forced to take care of her father, Imam Malik who has a mysterious illness. Sakinah's poor life was put to the test when she and her daughter have been disturbed several times by the devil. Sakinah believed what she faced comes from Abu Jar (Nasir Bilal Khan), a hypocrite and head of heresy in the same village. Abu Jar has a lot of followers and feared among the villagers. Sakinah or anyone who still holds Islam is the enemy of Abu Jar.

Abu Jar uses black magic and jin to destroy anyone who does not follow his teachings. This forces Sakinah to search for Ustaz Adam. The arrival of Ustaz Adam from the village across drive Abu Jar mad. Adam was not only surprised by what happened to the Sakinah family but also with the deviant teachings of Abu Jar who deflected the faith of the Muslims in the village.

== Cast ==
- Syamsul Yusof as Ustaz Adam
- Maya Karin as Sakinah
- Fizz Fairuz as Ustaz Azman
- Nasir Bilal Khan as Abu Jar
- Mawi as Azhar
- Fauzi Nawawi as Umar
- Rahim Razali as Rahim
- Namron as Rahman
- Roslan Salleh as Imam Malik
- Ku Faridah as Salmah
- Nur Zara Sofia as Aina
- Weni Panca as Mystery Black Woman

== Production ==
The film was officially announced in April 2016, two months after the release of the first film. In March 2017, Nabila Huda announced her departure from being the cast members of Munafik 2 due to scheduling conflicts. Syamsul announced that Maya Karin will be joined cast members and being chosen to cast as Sakinah. Nasir Bilal Khan, best known for television roles was cast as Abu Jar, a Muslim deviant cult leader; Munafik 2 was his second film with Syamsul after Bohsia: Jangan Pilih Jalan Hitam (2009). Fauzi Nawawi was cast as Umar, Abu Jar's right-hand man; For this film, he took his mother's advice before taking the role.

The filming budget was estimated at RM2.8 million compared to its predecessor's filming cost which estimated at RM1.5 million. Principal photography began on 20 March 2017 in various places including Kuala Lumpur, Klang Valley as well as Chini Lake in Pahang and filming wrapped on 30 May 2017.

== Release ==
=== Reception ===
Munafik 2 was released on 30 August 2018 in Malaysia and in Indonesia on 26 September 2018.

The film grossed RM2.05 million on the official opening day, thus overcoming Mamat Khalid’s horror comedy Hantu Kak Limah which only collected RM650,000. Munafik 2 grossed more than RM3.6 million on its first day of official premiere and successfully managed to top the GSC movie charts, behind over five other films including The Equalizer 2, Crazy Rich Asians and Hantu Kak Limah 3. The film succeeded in creating a distinctive history in the Malay film industry when it collected box-office gross RM 21.6 million within four days, against its predecessor. Munafik 2 managed to garner a record high of RM30 million within 10 days, compared to the predecessor which earned RM 17.04 million. As of September 2018, the film managed to collect RM35 million gross, much higher than its predecessor as well as Hantu Kak Limah. As of November 2018, Munafik 2 garnered box office gross a total of RM48 million for Malaysia, Brunei, Singapore and Indonesia with RM37.74 million to within Malaysia at that time.

=== Media release ===
Beginning 1 May 2019, Munafik 2 is available for streaming at Netflix.

== Sequel ==
When asked about the sequel to Munafik 2, Syamsul said he did not rule out the possibility of directing the third film and planned to make it a media franchise. He said in an interview with Utusan Malaysia: "The script for the third Munafik film has yet to be completed but I have a plot in mind. I’ve always had plans to make Munafik a trilogy since the first film in 2016," (Note: Original: "Skrip untuk naskhah ketiga Munafik belum siap sepenuhnya. Namun, saya sudah ada bayangan jalan cerita yang sentiasa berlegar-legar di fikiran. Rancangan untuk menghasilkan Munafik dalam bentuk trilogi sudah ada sejak pembikinan naskhah pertama pada 2016 lagi,") He later confirms that the third sequel, Munafik 3 will began filming in 2019. Though the film is originally planned to be released in 2020, however, the anticipated film did not materialise due to the ongoing COVID-19 pandemic.

== See also ==
- List of Islamic films
