= Ombak Rindu =

- Directed by: Osman Ali
- Written by: Fauziah Ashari
- Based on: Ombak Rindu by Fauziah Ashari
- Produced by: Sharad Sharan
- Starring: Aaron Aziz; Maya Karin; Lisa Surihani; Bront Palarae
- Cinematography: Khalid Zakaria
- Edited by: Affandi Jamaludin
- Production company: Tarantella Pictures
- Distributed by: Astro Shaw
- Release date: 23 November 2011
- Running time: 120 minutes
- Country: Malaysia
- Language: Malaysian
- Budget: MYR 1.56 million
- Box office: MYR 10.9 million

Ombak Rindu (English: Love Waves) is 2011 Malaysian Malay-language romantic drama family conflict film directed by Osman Ali, starring Aaron Aziz, Maya Karin, Lisa Surihani and Bront Palarae. The film was adapted from the 2002 novel of the same name written by Fauziah Ashari, published by Alaf 21.

== Plot ==
Izzah (Maya Karin) and Hariz (Aaron Aziz) are from two different worlds and they have to face many hurdles before finding happiness. Izzah is a village girl who is sold by her uncle to an entertainment club in Kuala Lumpur to become a prostitute. Hariz is a young man who is the son of Madam Sufiah Hariz (Azizah Mahzan), the owner of the business empire 'Sufiah Catering'. He buys Izzah to be his mistress, but Izzah pleads with him to marry her instead to legalise their relationship.

Hariz agrees to the terms, provided that Izzah not claim any rights as a wife. However, the rough and hot-tempered Hariz finds himself falling in love with Izzah who is full of tenderness. Their relationship is frowned upon by Madam Sufiah. Hariz is then forced to marry Mila Amylia (Lisa Surihani), a childhood friend and now a famous model and actress, after being pressured by his mother. When Hariz falls into a coma in the hospital due to a road accident, Madam Sufiah drives Izzah out of the bungalow and confiscates the car keys and mobile phones.

Once out of the hospital, Madam Sufiah lies to Hariz about Izzah having forgotten about him and having a relationship with another man. She produces a photograph, apparently taken by a private detective, that shows Mail, Izzah's childhood friend, appearing intimate with Izzah (in fact, Izzah was helping Mail get a job in KL and had put him up at Pak Dolah's house). Hariz drives over to Pak Dolah's house and sees Mail and Izzah there, thereby confirming his mother's allegations. He gets angry at Izzah and tells her that he is leaving her. As he drives off in his car, Izzah chases him and falls. She starts to bleed, implying that she may be suffering a miscarriage. At the hospital, she and baby are found to be safe.

Pak Dollah arrives at Hariz's home and confronts Madam Sufiah. Hariz learns of the secret pact that Pak Dolah and Madam Sufiah's husband had made many years ago. Hariz has been given up for adoption to Madam Sufiah and her husband. Hariz feels remorseful and misses Izzah who has gone to her village. He goes to her village to ask for forgiveness. Izzah readily accepts him. Mila appears at the village and after realising that Hariz and Izzah are very much in love, she asks Hariz to divorce her. The film ends with Izzah and Hariz leading a simple happy life together.

== Cast ==
- Aaron Aziz as Hariz
- Maya Karin as Izzah
- Lisa Surihani as Mila Amylia Rasyhdan
- Bront Palarae as Mail

=== Supporting Characters ===
- Julia Ziegler as Wafiah
- Azizah Mahzan as Datuk Sufiah
- Zaidi Omar as Pak Dollah
- Normah Damanhuri as Mak Jah
- Noor Adila as assistant house
- Asya Alesya as assistant Wafiah
- Nadiya Nisaa as Seha

== Reviews ==
The film received poor reviews from critics, but has received superb positive reviews from general audiences.

== Lawsuits ==
Controversy occurred when the author of this novel, Fauziah Ashari, claimed she did not get paid accordingly based on the collection of broken film stage. In addition, she also stated that she was not called on to be an advisor in the production of the script nor was she called to be the playwright of the film.

But her statement was repulsed by Karangkraf Media Group Managing Director, Datuk Hussamuddin Yaacub. He stated that the process of adapting the novel to film scripts had been conducted since 2009. He also refuted the allegations that writers did not get adequate pay as he had given nearly RM 200,000 as royalty. Additionally, the author of the book will benefit from the increased revenue from the sales of the book due to the commercial success of the film.

== Achievements ==
- Best Director = Osman Ali
- Best Actress = Maya Karin
- Best Cinematography = Khalid Zakaria|
- Award for Greatest Director = Osman Ali
- Greatest Hero Award = Aaron Aziz
- Greatest Heroine Award = Maya Karin
- Awards Greatest Movie Songs = Hafiz & Adira - "Love Waves"
