= The Cursed Land (film) =

- Film poster
- Thai: แดนสาป
- Directed by: Panu Aree
- Written by: Panu Aree; Kong Rithdee
- Produced by: Nonzee Nimibutr
- Starring: Ananda Everingham; Bront Palarae; Jennis Oprasert; Seeda Puapimon
- Cinematography: Chankit Chamnivikaipong
- Edited by: Harin Paesongthai; Nisarat Meechok
- Music by: Terdsak Janpan
- Production company: Neramitnang Film
- Distributed by: Shinesaeng Ad.Venture; Redice Entertainment
- Release date: 11 July 2024
- Running time: 130 minutes
- Country: Thailand
- Languages: Thai; Malay

The Cursed Land (Thai: แดนสาป, pronounced [dɛ̄ːn sàːp]) is a 2024 Thai supernatural horror film starring Ananda Everingham, Bront Palarae, Jennis Oprasert and Seeda Puapimon.

== Plot ==
Mit, an engineer, was promoted to chief factory engineer. His wife, Ann, had died in a car accident not long after his promotion celebration. Since that accident, Mit has often experienced unexplainable headaches and is also in a prolonged guilty and grieving state, making him unstable and vulnerable. He and his teenage daughter, May, moved to a two-story ancient wooden house his factory rented in Nong Chok, a Muslim-majority suburb of Bangkok. From the first day he moved in, Mit felt alienated and distrustful of the locals, who only said he could renovate the house but not move or throw away anything from the house. Mit sees a lot of protective Arabic and Jawi talismans hung over every entrance of the house. He gets rid of everything and defies the local's warnings. A local Muslim man, Heem, is seen in his yard suspiciously, further making him distrust the locals and become more reclusive. Enraged with Heem's unexplained acts, Mit fights Heem when he meets Heem in a local tea house. People at the tea house separated them and said that Heem was a good man but had failed to study the art of bomoh while living in Southern Thailand and had gone insane.

Soon, Mit and May are haunted, and many unexplained disturbances happen in the house, which eventually expands when they leave outside. May look after a brahmin and invited bhikkhus to bless and ward the house. The Brahmin installed a spirit house, which the house lacked. During the installation, the Brahmin found a sealed, small, single-curved kris. Remembering the local warning, May chooses to keep it despite the Brahmin warning her. After the spirit house is installed, the disturbances become more profound. May asked the bhikkhus for help, but they denied it because things outside their Buddhist spiritual jurisdiction caused the disturbances. May is recommended to look for help from Islamic spiritualists, as Nong Chok is a Muslim area.

While discussing the recent deaths and disturbances, Yah revealed to May that Heem is an Islamic spiritualist May is looking for. Heem then revealed that May and Mit had made fatal mistakes and advised them to move out. Feeling disappointed, May went home and found that Mit harming himself resulted in his leg being seriously injured. Heem saves them and takes them somewhere in Narathiwat to meet Zainab, a retired, experienced bomoh and his spiritual mentor. Despite looking senile, Zainab is aware of an evil djinn riding Mit and provokes the jinn to reveal itself. The jinn then fully possessed Mit, and she could exorcise him.

Zainab revealed that the house belonged to an evil Siamese landlord 200 years ago. Back in the past, the landlord had a lot of Malay Muslim slaves, including Kadir and Mud. Kadir was a bomoh back in his home country, and Mud was his student. After a successful exorcism and sealing of a forest spirit that disturbed the slave encampment, Kadir and Mud quarreled due to their differing ideals on slavery, resulting in Kadir quitting and escaping. Mud reported Kadir to his landlord, resulting in Kadir being pursued by the landlord, the landlord's henchmen, and his former friends. Kadir ran into a field until he was cornered. Upon learning that the field is ruled by an Ifrit, Kadir cast away his Islamic faith and invoked the Ifrit's power to curse the land forever, with his kris as a conduit. Kadir was then decapitated for his acts. When asked to lift Kadir's curse, Mud refused and cast a spell to kill everyone on site except him and the Malay Muslim slaves. They buried Kadir and his sealed kris in the landlord's house. As the landlord died, Mud usurped the house, and using what he had learned, he created counter-curse talismans and placed a forest spirit Kadir captured in a birdcage as his guardian. Eventually, Mud and other slaves were executed by drowning by soldiers who learned about the incident. Learning about the curse, the soldiers bring their shamans and spiritualists for counter-curse but cannot fully counter what Kadir and Mud started. As a result of conflicting and overlapping curses and counter-curses, the house becomes too cursed and cannot be fully inhabited. When Mit recklessly removed the protective talismans to keep all djinns in check, and May established the spirit house that invited more heathen spirits and djinns, in the process, they broke the spiritual balance. They unleashed vengeful djinns and their 200-year-old curse.

At their house, Mit and May learn they cannot move out. During that time, Mit and May are attacked by djinns in the form of poltergeists who wreak havoc inside the house. In the chaos, an urn of Ann's ashes is broken. Brokenhearted, Mit is deceived by a djinn that casts a spell on him, hallucinating seeing Ann and almost making him insane. May eventually brings Mit's sanity back and helps Mit break the djinn's spell. Zainab and her students Heem and others came and located the Kadir's kris. The Ifrit appears and morphs into Kadir's appearance. Using the kris, Heem taunts the Ifrit that ruled the land. The Ifrit repeated Kadir's curse and tried to deceive Zainab and Heem to stop, but they unfaltered. Heem can eventually drive the Ifrit away using Throne Verse, and Kadir's Kris is destroyed. Heem found that the spirit house was built atop Kadir's grave and secured a surviving piece of Kadir's bone. Zainab revealed that Kadir was one of her ancestors and wanted to take his bones for burial in his native homeland.

Mit and May invited their Muslim neighbors, including Heem and Zainab, for a housewarming party. When everything seems fine, Mit and May hear a rumbling sound upstairs, revealing that the Mud's birdcage is shaking violently.

== Cast ==
- Ananda Everingham as Mit
- Bront Palarae as Heem
- Jennis Oprasert as May
- Seeda Puapimon as Zainab
- Priya Sangkhachinda as Yah
- Firdaus Karim as Kadir
- Han Zalini as Mud
- Yhok Sirimart as Ann
- Apisit Hmuenyota as Bang Yub
- Kanistar Krobtaku as Bang Marn
- Jirasak Taleanoy as Zakariya
- Piyaphan Yongtheeraphan as Asano
- Suchet Rattananon as Boy
- Rattanachai Phakdirat as Muslim Man

== Production, release and criticism ==
The Cursed Land is set in the rainforests of Malaya Peninsula. It was filmed in a real location in the Baha-Hala Forestland, Narathiwat Province in lower southern Thailand, which is the border with Malaysia. The house is assumed to be Mit and May's new home was filmed at Ban Khiao (บ้านเขียว, [bâːn kʰǐa̯w], "green house"), a real ancient wooden house that is famous for being a haunted house in Ayutthaya Province.

In the trailer of the film, there appears to be ghostly Muslim women in prayer clothes. There is criticism that this is an insult to Islam. The producer has denied this and has issued a written clarification.

It is the second film about superstition and supernatural beings among Muslims after The Djinn's Curse, which was released in November 2023, making them rare content in the Thai film industry. Panu Aree, the director and co-writer is also a Muslim.

The film releases domestically on July 11, 2024, and has been shown at several international film festivals such as International Film Festival Rotterdam (IFFR) in the Netherlands, Ho Chi Minh City International Film Festival in Vietnam, Asian Film Festivals in Italy, Bucheon International Fantastic Film Festival (BiFan) in South Korea, and New York Asian Film Festival (NYAFF) in the United States.

Facebook Jubphitnang criticized that "it's like they're taking us into a haunted house, the Muslim version of The Conjuring".

Sirote Klampaiboon of Matichon Weekly writes that "although its form looks like a horror genre, but in essence it is a mystery film that should be credited with having a magical realism style. Because it is full of supernatural things mixed with the real world all the time". He also praised it as a Thai film that cannot be missed, because it concerns the issue of space, which is a regional and global issue. The Cursed Land is a Thai film that goes to new frontiers, which has never been seen in many years.

== See also ==
- Islam in Thailand
- Malaysia–Thailand relations
