= Anak Halal =

2007 Malaysian action thriller film

- Directed by: Osman Ali
- Written by: Osman Ali
- Screenplay by: Osman Ali
- Produced by: Gayatri Su-Lin Pillai
- Starring: Farid Kamil; Maya Karin; Fasha Sandha; Adi Putra
- Cinematography: Khalid Zakaria
- Edited by: Affandi Jamaludin
- Music by: Nur Zaidi Abdul Rahman
- Production company: Tayangan Unggul
- Distributed by: Astro Shaw
- Release date: 13 December 2007 (Malaysia)
- Running time: 119 minutes
- Country: Malaysia
- Language: Malay

Anak Halal is a 2007 Malaysian Malay-language action thriller film written and directed by Osman Ali and starring Farid Kamil, Maya Karin, Fasha Sandha and Adi Putra. It was released on 13 December 2007.

== Plot ==
The film starts with Hisham, who is a wanted criminal. In a frenzy to save his son's life, he begged a mentally ill woman named Mariam, who lived in hallway, to adopt his son. Hisham was captured by the police after a shootout. Mariam ended up raising the child and named him, Inderaputera. They lived in the slums, neighboring Bu Leha and his daughter, Johanna (Jo), a tomboy girl, who secretly loves Putera. Putera was miserable while being raised by Miriam. He finally felt euphoric when the authorities separated him from Miriam.

Putera was raised by Bu Leha, who took Putra and Jo moved to Kuala Lumpur in the hope their lives will be better. They grew up as homeless youth. While Putra had to work in a garage, Jo and her mother had to sell fruits at Chow Kit Market for a living. Meanwhile, Erzan and Milya were also among the close friends of Putera and Jo. They earn a living by hawking burgers. Together, Danial and Shah, deal with painful bitterness of life in the city.

Amira Atikah, a teenage girl who had problems with drugs, is present in their lives. Her presence gave a new color for the prince, who first wanted to know what the meaning of love was. Erzan was situated of uncertainty when the family had to bear the burden of debt from Tajul. He often interrupted by assistant Tajul that Jeff and Lut. Action Erzan who had drug trafficking to settle family debts by Tajul. This makes the Putra outraged by the actions of Erzan. The situation became alarmed when Tajul got to know the things that were taken by Ijam to be distributed have been taken. Tajul hunts down to Ijam and Erzan and kill Ijam. Tajul ask Erzan to provide all the available drugs in stock.

On a day when Erzan returned the drugs, he was shot dead by Jeff and Lut. Putra and Shah pursued them but were unsuccessful. Drastic measures were taken by the Putera after the death of Amira Atikah due to drug abuse. He decided to hunt Tajul and his friends for revenge afterwards because his friends died. As a result, Jeff was stabbed to death by Milya and Putera attacked them until he went to Tajul's residence. Hisham, who was released from prison and still continue in the dark, told Tajul spend what he has started. Tajul managed to caught Putera but was shot dead by Johanna. After finding the adventurer who led his life chaos, he finally meet with his father, Hisham and his adoptive mother, Mariam. The meeting was finally brought tragedy when Putera shots his own father. They were running away after Lut bring more people to hunt Putera with friends. Putera, Mariam and his friends escape and finally they were imprisoned by the police.

== Cast ==
- Farid Kamil as Inderaputra
- Maya Karin as Johanna
- Fasha Sandha as Amira Atikah
- Adi Putra as Erzan
- Bront Palarae as Daniel
- Remy Ishak as Shah
- Raja Farah as Milya
- Zul Huzaimy as Tajul
- Fauzi Nawawi as Jeff
- Fizz Fairuz as Lut
- Jehan Miskin as Ijam
- Rosyam Nor as Hisyam
- Mislina Mustaffa as Mariam
- Kartina Aziz as Bu Leha
- Aziz Sattar as Pak Ali
- Ahmad Tarmimi Siregar as Datuk Farid
- Shah Kimin as Shah
