= Ibn Battuta: The Animated Series =

Malaysian animated television series

- Promotional poster
- Also known as: The Adventures of Ibn Battuta
- Country of origin: Malaysia
- Original languages: English; Malay

Production
- Running time: 26 minutes

Original release
- Network: TV2

The Adventures of Ibn Battuta is a 2010 Malaysian 13-part historical animated series broadcast by TV2. The series is based on the biography of medieval world traveller Ibn Battuta, who, over a period of 30 years from 1325 to 1354, is said to have visited more than 17 countries before and after his Hajj pilgrimage.

== See also ==
- List of Islamic films
