= Bront Palarae =

Malaysian actor, director, screenwriter, and producer

- برونت بالاراي
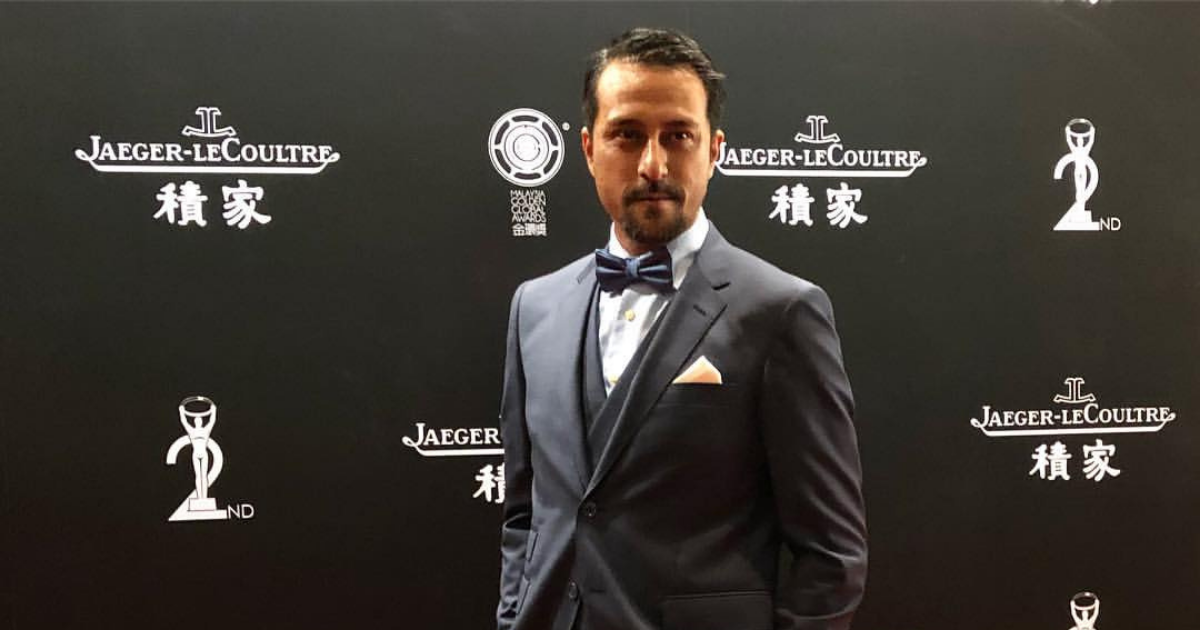
- Born: Nasrul Suhaimi; 27 September 1978 (age 48); Alor Setar, Kedah, Malaysia
- Occupations: Actor, director, screenwriter, producer, host
- Years active: 2001–present
- Spouse: Rozi Izma (m. 2013)
- Children: Adeena Imani

Nasrul Suhaimin bin Saifuddin (born 27 September 1978), known professionally as Bront Palarae, is a Malaysian actor, film director, screenwriter and producer.

Bront built his career in the early 2001 with roles in Castello, Bilut & 1957: Hati Malaya. He also frequently collaborated with director Mamat Khalid resulted in the films Man Laksa (2006) & Kala Malam Bulan Mengambang (2008). They also co-wrote the script together for Tipah Tertipu The Movie (2006) which he also starred in.

Bront portrayed a private investigator in Belukar (2010). He was the producer of One Two Jaga (2018), which won 6 awards including Best Picture at 30th Malaysia Film Festival.

== Early life and education ==
Bront was born in Alor Setar, Kedah, Malaysia. His father is of mixed Malay, Siam & Chinese descent whereas his mother's family is Thai & Pakistani where her surnamed was "Palarae" (Thai: ปาลาเร่) hence his stage name; his mother migrated across the border to Malaysia to start a new life together after their marriage. Bront is fluent in Thai himself.

== Personal life ==
In 2005, he received a scholarship from the Italian government to attend a short course in Language & Culture at the University for Foreigners Perugia, Italy. He overstayed and toured the country for the next four months.

He took another sabbatical in 2017, this time, he chose Palo Alto, California as his destination. With a scholarship from Ministry of Finance Malaysia, he pursued and completed Innovation & Entrepreneurship Studies at Stanford University.

He later studied at the Asia School of Business. and graduated with a Master of Business Administration (MBA) in 2026. His studies included an academic immersion at the Massachusetts Institute of Technology (MIT) in Cambridge, Massachusetts.

== Acting career ==
=== 2001–2008: Early years ===
Palarae made his acting debut on television in 2001 with the telemovie Mat Nor Kusyairi & The Velvet Boys directed by Mamat Khalid and produced by Tiara Jacquelina. His collaboration with Mamat Khalid brought him onto his first feature film Lang Buana (2003). He first gained fame by portraying two characters in Cinta Tsunami, a television series in 2005.

In 2008, with the release of his biggest commercial success, Sindarela (Cinderella), he rose to prominence in a lead role, Hussin on the hit television series with Sharifah Amani and Remy Ishak, followed by another television series, Rona Roni Makaroni in the same year, again with Sharifah Amani.

=== 2009–2015: Breaking into film ===
Uncomfortable with his career direction, the media-shy actor turned his focus to film roles. Since then, he started attracting a variety of roles in films including Anak Halal (2005), Man Laksa (2005) and Bilut (2005). His first major role was in V3: Samseng Jalanan, starring alongside Farid Kamil who also directed the movie.

In 2009, Palarae starred in Belukar alongside Daphne Iking, directed by Jason Chong. Though the movie did not do well at the box office, his acting was praised among critics and audiences alike. He won the Best Actor award at the 23rd Malaysia Film Festival and also the Anugerah Skrin 2010 for his performance in Belukar.

In 2010, Palarae co-founded Otto Films and through the company, he co-produced, co-written & co-directed Kolumpo, a feature film released in 2013. He also served Camwerk Studios as a Creative Consultant to help developed The Kidnap Case of Ammar Affendi and secured a co-production deal with RexMedia (US) at the Marche Du Film at Festival De Cannes at the same year. He was later appointed as the Brand Ambassador for Edwin Denim Malaysia and also the face of local fashion designer Fairuz Ramdhan.

=== 2016–present: Going regional ===
In 2016, Palarae starred in the sport history film Ola Bola, Chiu Keng Guan's latest film after the record-breaking The Journey. Not only that the film made RM15.85 million and became the 5th highest-grossing Malaysian film of all time, Bront also won the Kuala Lumpur Critics' Choice Award 2016 in the Best Supporting category, for his role in the film.

After winning the Best Actor award for Terbaik Dari Langit at the Asean International Film Festivals (AIFFA) 2015, he was roped in for HBO Asia's original series titled Halfworlds directed by Indonesian filmmaker, Joko Anwar. He later joined the Mo Brothers on their latest film titled Headshot, starring Iko Uwais. In 2016, Palarae joined the cast of comedy film My Stupid Boss as a collaboration with another Indonesian filmmaker, Upi Avianto.

At the recent 2016 Asian Television Award, Palarae was nominated for his role in the telemovie Eropah, Here I am through the "Best Actor In A Leading Role" category.

Bront later appeared on Pengabdi Setan (Satan's Slave), a remake of classic Indonesian horror film by Joko Anwar. This would be his second collaboration with Joko after HBO Asia's Halfworlds series. Pengabdi Setan became the highest-grossing film in Indonesia for 2017 and being distributed in 26 countries under CJ Entertainment (Korea). They later made two films together, Gundala in 2019 & Pengabdi Setan 2: Communion

In 2020, he won the Best Actor award at 25th Asian Television Awards (ATA) for his role as Inspektor Megat in the asian adaptation of The Bridge series. He also starred in an adventure drama Edge of the World, directed by Michael Haussman and starring Jonathan Rhys Meyers as the British soldier and adventurer James Brooke (1803–1868), the first White Rajah of Sarawak.

== Humanitarian work ==
In 2012, Palarae joined the AQSA2Gaza11 Emergency Relief trip to Gaza.

He was the goodwill ambassadors for the UNICEF's My Promise To Children campaign to emphasise children's rights in Malaysia.

== Filmography ==
=== Film ===
Year	Title	Role	Notes
2003	Lang Buana	Perdana	Debut film appearance
2006	Man Laksa	Mat Topoi	
2006	Castello	Chet	
2006	Bilut	Rosli	
2006	Tipah Tertipu The Movie	Bad Guy	
2007	1957: Hati Malaya	Muzaffar	
2007	Anak Halal	Danny	
2007	Apa Khabar Orang Kampung (Village People Radio Show)	Radio Actor	
2008	Akhirat	Ramon	
2008	Kala Malam Bulan Mengambang	Mahinder Singh	
2008	Antoo Fighter: Amukan Drakulat	Rambo	
2009	Setem	Abu Bakar / 'Burn'	
2009	15Malaysia	Pedophile Man	Episode: "Lolipop", short film anthology
2010	V3 Samseng Jalanan	Brett	
2010	Belukar	Nik	
2011	Vote!		Video short
2011	Jalan Pintas	Homeless Man	
2011	Quattro Hongkong 2		Segment: "Open Verdict"
2011	Kongsi	Kempedu	
2011	Sekali Lagi	Haris	
2011	Ombak Rindu	Ismail	
2012	Bunohan	Deng	
2012	Jiwa Taiko	Pinto	
2012	Lagenda Budak Setan 2: Katerina	Hisyam	
2013	Juvana	Warden Encik Raja	Cameo
2013	Bikers Kental	Ponthaliwat	
2013	Psiko: Si Pencuri Hati	O. Sidi	
2013	Kolumpo	Police Officer A	Also as director and writer
2014	Sejoli: Misi Cantas Cinta	Jo	
2014	Lagenda Budak Setan 3: Kasyah	Hisyam	
2014	Pintu Neraka	Norzain	
2014	Anak Jantan	Somchai	
2014	Dollah Superstar	Himself	Cameo
2014	Terbaik Dari Langit	Berg	
2015	Redemption Night	Rahman	
2015	Jwanita	Farhan	
2015	Girlfriend Kontrak	Zain	
2016	Ola Bola	Rahman	
2016	My Stupid Boss	Adrian	
2016	Headshot	Interpol Agent Ali	Indonesian film
2016	Hanyut	Sayed Rashid	
2016	Art Through Our Eyes	The Stranger	Segment 'Aku"
2017	Kau Takdirku	Harris	
2017	Satan's Slaves (Pengabdi Setan)	Bahri Suwono	Indonesian film
2017	Ayat-Ayat Cinta 2	Baruch	Indonesian film
2018	Dukun	Shah	
2018	One Two Jaga	Investigating Officer	Also as producer
2019	Bikers Kental 2	Ponthaliwat	
2019	Fly by Night	Inspector Kamal	
2019	KL Vampires	Himself	Opening voice over
2019	Wira	Colenal Izzar	Cameo
2019	Gundala	Pengkor	Indonesian film
2019	Love Is a Bird	Darma	Indonesian film
2020	Motel Acacia	Bront	Philippines film
2020	Tyickoouns	Long	Ewayang.com film
2020	Hail, Driver!	Toompang Broker	
2021	Edge of the World	Pengiran Indera Mahkota	
2021	Zombitopia	Dr. Rahman	
2021	Barbarian Invasion	Adnan	
2021	Proksi	Sam	
2022	Stone Turtle	Samad	
2022	Satan's Slaves 2: Communion (Pengabdi Setan 2)	Bahri Suwono	Indonesian film
2022	Seratus	Elevator Passengers	Cameo
2023	Harum Malam	Norman	
2023	Eraser	Judge 1	Special appearance
2023	Sumpahan Jerunei	Dr. Sani	
2023	MALBATT: Misi Bakara	Major Adnan	
2023	Sleep Call	Tommy	Indonesian film
2023	Wow+	Dr. Zaman Khan	Short film
2023	Abang Adik	Kamarul	Special appearance
2024	The Cursed Land	Heem	Thai film
2025	Gantung: Kod Musketeer		Cameo
2025	Dendam Malam Kelam	Arya Pradana	Indonesian film
2025	Mencari Ramlee	Theater Actor Zakaria	Cameo
2025	Tee Yai: Born To Be Bad	Chief Police Weera	Netflix Originals Thailand
2026
2026	Libang Libu	Mr Bront	Special appearance
2026	Ghost in the Cell	Jefry	Indonesian film
2026	Kong Tao	Amin	Malaysia-Thailand film
2026	Tarung: Unforgiven	Khalid	
2026	Red Before Dawn		
TBA
TBA	My Wife is a Gangster	Kobra	Indonesian film; Post-production
TBA	Sabung	Jay	Post-production
TBA	The Diary	Warden Kiatt	Thai film
TBA	Safari Mall	Himself	Post-production

=== Television series ===
Year	Title	Role	TV channel	Notes
2003	Dengan Nama Cinta		NTV7	
2004	Rumah itu Duniaku		TV1	
2004	Garisan Takdir		Mediacorp Suria	
2004	Cinta Tsunami	Amran / Rangsit	TV3	
2007	Cinta Secangkir Kopi	Ammar	TV9	
2008	Sindarella	Hussein	TV3	
2008	Rona Roni Makaroni	Roni	Astro Ria	
2009	Tower 13	Adam / Johan Ariff	TV3	
2009	Tangkal Besi		Astro Citra	
2010	Ibn Battuta: The Animated Series		TV2	Voice only
2011	Juvana	Warden Encik Raja / Balaji	TV3	
2011	Hajar Aswad	Asrul Aswad	TV9	
2012	Pulau	Azri	TV9	
2012	Projek Pop		8TV	Special appearance
2012	I Eat KL		Unifi TV	
2015	Halfworlds (Season 1)	Gusti	HBO	
2016	Dark Triptych			1 episode
2018	Doors: A Philippines Horror Anthology		BOO	Episode: "Daddy's Home"
2018	Folklore	MP	HBO	Episode: "Toyol"
2018–2020	The Bridge	Megat Jamil	HBO/Viu	
2023	Katarsis	Dr. Alfons	Vidio	
2026	Kisah Bawah Tanah	Bang Kai	Astro Prima	Voice only

=== Telemovie ===
Year	Title	Role	TV channel
2001	Mat Nor Kusyairi & The Velvet Boys	Mat Topoi	NTV7
2003	Neon	Ringgo's Friend	VCD
2004	Zon 606	Fariz	VCD
2009	Senandung Malam		Astro Prima
2010	Bunga Rampai Musim Tengkujuh	Jamal	TV1
2012	Kasih Bumi	Bumi	TV9
2013	New York Cinta	Seth	Astro First Exclusive
2014	Sebenarnya	Khaliff	TV3
2015	3 Nota	Atoi	Astro Prima
2016	Eropah, Here I AM	Bukhari	Astro Citra
2017	Kekasih Elektrik	Amri Rohaizad Fan	Astro Citra
2018	Janji Zehan-Lahzeya Bi Payan	Faizal	Astro First Exclusive

=== Television ===
Year	Title	Role	Network
2003	Beat TV	Host	Astro Ria

=== TV commercials ===
Year	Title
2006	Hotlink Maxis Prepaid
2008	Visit Singapore
2021	Saji: Mangkuk Tingkat Mak Teh
2021	Netflix Bila Raya Tak Payah Ber
2022	Samsung: Rezeki Memori
2026	MBSB Bank: Rezeki Mutiara
2026	Takaful Ikhlas: Raya Ads

== Videography ==
=== Music video ===
Year	Song title	Artist
2013	"Menunggu"	Akim Ahmad
2017	"Kembali"	Kaka Azraff

== Awards and nominations ==
Year	Awards	Category	Nominated works	Result
2010	14th Anugerah Skrin	Best Male Actor	Belukar	Won
2010	23rd Malaysia Film Festival	Best Male Actor	Belukar	Won
2010	23rd Malaysia Film Festival	Best Male Supporting Actor	V3: Samseng Jalanan	Nominated
2010	24th Anugerah Bintang Popular Berita Harian	Most Popular Male Film Actor	Bront Palarae	Nominated
2011	25th Anugerah Bintang Popular Berita Harian	Most Popular Male Film Actor	Bront Palarae	Nominated
2012	16th Anugerah Skrin	Best Male Supporting Film Actor	Jiwa Taiko	Nominated
2012	25th Malaysia Film Festival	Best Male Supporting Actor	Jiwa Taiko	Nominated
2012	The Kuala Lumpur Film Critics' Circle Award	Best Male Supporting Actor	Jiwa Taiko	Nominated
2012	26th Anugerah Bintang Popular Berita Harian	Most Popular Male Actor	Bront Palarae	Nominated
2012	26th Anugerah Bintang Popular Berita Harian	Most Popular Villain in Film or Drama	Bront Palarae	Nominated
2013	Anugerah Blokbuster 2	Best Villain Award	Jiwa Taiko	Nominated
2014	Anugerah Stail EH!	Most Stylish Male Celebrity	Bront Palarae	Nominated
2014	Anugerah Stail EH!	Most Sexy Male Celebrity	Bront Palarae	Nominated
2014	Anugerah Lawak Warna 2	Best Male Comedy Actor (Film)	Sejoli	Won
2014	26th Malaysia Film Festival	Best Male Actor	Psiko Pencuri Hati	Nominated
2014	18th Anugerah Skrin	Best Male Film Actor	Psiko Pencuri Hati	Won
2014	The Kuala Lumpur Film Critics' Circle Award	Best Male Actor	Psiko Pencuri Hati	Nominated
2015	Anugerah MeleTOP Era 2	Bintang Filem MeleTOP	Bront Palarae	Nominated
2015	27th Malaysia Film Festival	Best Male Actor	Terbaik dari Langit	Nominated
2015	ASEAN International Film Festival	Best Male Actor	Terbaik dari Langit	Won
2016	The Kuala Lumpur Film Critics' Circle Award	Best Male Actor	Ola Bola	Won
2016	Anugerah Melodi 2016	Personaliti Filem Melodi	Bront Palarae	Nominated
2016	Asian Television Award 2016	Best Actor	Eropah Here I Am	Nominated
2017	Festival Film Tempo 2017 (Indonesia)	Best Supporting Actor	Pengabdi Setan	Nominated
2018	IBOMA Awards 2018 (Indonesia)	Best Actor	Pengabdi Setan	Nominated
2019	7th QCinema International Film Festival (Philippines)	Best Actor	Fly by Night	Nominated
2019	Film Pilihan Tempo 2019 (Indonesia)	Best Supporting Actor	Gundala	Nominated
2020	IBOMA Awards 2019 (Indonesia)	Best Supporting Actor	Gundala	Nominated
2020	Asian Academy Creative Award	Best Actor in a Leading Role	The Bridge	Nominated
2020	ContentAsia Awards	Best Male Lead in a TV Programme	The Bridge	Nominated
2020	Asian Television Awards (ATA)	Best Actor in a Leading Role	The Bridge	Nominated
2020	Asian Television Awards (ATA)	Best Leading Male Performance - Digital	The Bridge	Won
2021	Majlis Pengkritik Filem KL	Best Supporting Actor	Barbarian Invasion	Nominated
2025	21st Baan Nang Klang Lakorn Awards (Thailand)	Best Supporting Actor	The Cursed Land	Won
	TrustGu Thai Film Awards (Thailand)	Best Supporting Actor	The Cursed Land	Won
2026	Bangkok International Film Festival	Suratsawadi Honorary Award	Bront Palaree	Won
