= Jwanita =

2015 film by Osman Ali

- Directed by: Osman Ali
- Starring: Maya Karin; Bront Palarae; Cristina Suzanne Stockstill; Marsha Milan Londoh
- Distributed by: Empire Film Solution
- Release date: 24 September 2015
- Running time: 100 minutes
- Country: Malaysia
- Language: Malay
- Budget: MYR 1.5 million
- Box office: MYR 1.5 million

Jwanita (abbr for Jiwa Wanita; Women Heart) is a 2015 Malaysian Malay-language psychological horror film directed by Osman Ali features A-List actors, Maya Karin, Bront Palarae, Cristina Suzanne Stockstill, Umie Aida, and Marsha Milan Londoh. The film tells of Jwanita (Maya Karin) who is separated from her younger sister, Julyka (Cristina Suzanne Stockstill) when she was little. She was raised by a Dukun (Shaman in English), (Umie Aida) and was often abused. After both adults, they met again but Jwanita had threatened Julyka's life and her family. It was released on 24 September 2015.

== Plot ==
Jwanita (Maya Karin) who was mentally ill and physically abused by Ibu / Dukun (Umie Aida) and her adopted father (Radin Intan), who practised black magic. Jwanita later met with Farhan (Bront Palarae) who took care of her after she had killed both her adopted parents in a tragic event. But everything was destroyed when her beloved Farhan was a fiancée of her own younger sister, Julyka (Cristina Suzanne Stockstill) who had been separated from her since childhood. After disappearing on the wedding day of Farhan and Julyka, Jwanita reappeared with a much different character.

Jwanita started teasing Dr. Farhan, to cheat on Julyka and incite his men. Miss, the maid (Marsha Milan Londoh) was threatened not to disturb her plans after she saw Jwanita worship. However, before Nona had informed her employer of Jwanita's weird behaviour, she had been killed. Jwanita then restored Miss Mary's body. Miss Nona has been used by Jwanita to disturb the two employees of Dr. Farhan, before they both were killed. Mayatt these three people were then used to disturb the life of Julyka.

Julyka starts to attempt to separate the children from Jwanita, due to suspicion of past tragic occurrences at the house. When Jwanita took the children out for a walk, Julyka has found Jwanita's place of worship in the warehouse. When Jwanita and the children return, she was angry when she learns that Julyka had found her place of worship, leading to her chasing to kill Julyka and her children. Once discovering that Julyka's children are rejecting her after what she did, Jwanita drags the children to her place of worship, with the intent to burn and kill them along with her corpses. Suddenly, Dr Farhan immediately confronts Jwanita to prevent her from killing her children, after discovering the damages done to his home and the wounded and bloodied Julyka. However, Dr Farhan gets wounded by Jwanita in the process of the whole family escaping the warehouse, causing them both to get burned alive in the warehouse, killing both of them.

Dr. Farhan and Julyka were almost safe but Jwanita had disbanded Dr. Farhan. Jwanita then commits suicide along with burning himself with Dr. Farhan. Julyka and her children, however, are safe.

== Cast ==
- Maya Karin as Jwanita
- Cristina Suzanne Stockstill as Julyka
- Bront Palarae as Dr Farhan
- Marsha Milan Londoh as Nona
- Umie Aida as stepmother Jwanita / Dukun (shaman)
- Elnisa Husni as young Jwanita

== Publishing ==
The movie director, Osman Ali, commented that he was inspired to produce the film from his readings on murder cases in the press. The film was his second horror movie after the Puaka Tebing Biru in 2007. The Jwanita character was written for Maya Karin and the Dukun character was specially created for Datin Umie Aida who had starred in the Dukun movie (2007). The film is also the first horror film for Bront Palarae. A total of 10 tongs of synthetic blood were imported from Thailand for use throughout the film.

During filming, Maya Karin too into character so Jwanita directors, Osman Ali and Bront Palarae did not dare approach him on the set filming. The film has been filming at Kijal and Kemaman, Terengganu, Kuala Lumpur and Kuala Kubu Baru. The process of filming takes a month, which is the shortest of the Osman Ali. There was a scene where Marsha was hanged and hit on the wall repeatedly. This half caused Marsha to experience bruises throughout the rounds. However, the post-production process has caused this movie to take three years before it can be aired.

== Reception ==
The film became popular in social media since the film was publicly televised.

=== Showing ===
The movie's trailer was uploaded to YouTube on 10 July 2015. The movie's premiere was performed at Nu Sentral's GSC on 8 September 2015. Some people were reportedly trapped and could not continue watching because it is too horrific. The film was publicly uploaded on 24 September 2015 in 57 cinemas. The film has been rated 18 by FINAS, after 30 percent of the horror scenes were cut by the director. After five days of airing, the movie managed to raise RM 600 thousand. After 21 days of the show, the film collected a collection of RM 1.5 million.

=== Reviews ===
The average review of the film is mixed. Most praise Maya Karin's acting as well as the horror elements in the movie despite the criticisms being directed towards the fibreboard arrangement. Mohd Al Qayum Azizi from mStar praised Osman Ali's instructions as well as encouraging actors from Umie Aida, Marsha Milan Londoh and Maya Karin. He also would not be surprised if, Maya got the nomination Best Actress for Malaysian Film Festival (FFM).

Deric Ect from the movie portal Dailyseni.com criticised the film as "good but not the best". He commented "the problem with this movie is Osman Ali." and despite the impressive performances of Maya Karin, the plot of the star-studded story as well as the directive of the director to retard this movie. He also pointed out that perhaps this film would cause the fall of Maya Karin in the film industry.

== Soundtrack ==
"Dendam Cinta"

Single by Alyah
- Released: 2015
- Recorded: 2015
- Genre: Ballad
- Length: 3:35 minutes
- Songwriter: Nurzaidi Abdul Rahman
- Producer: Nuansa Sdn Bhd

The OST of this film is Dendam Cinta (Revenge of Love in English) by Alyah. The song was launched on Hulu Kelang on 18 August 2015.
