= Punggok Rindukan Bulan =

- Directed by: Azharr Rudin
- Production company: Da Huang Pictures
- Release date: 2008
- Country: Malaysia

Punggok Rindukan Bulan (English title: This Longing) is a 2008 Malaysian film in the Malay language. It was directed by Azharr Rudin, in his directorial debut feature and produced by Da Huang Pictures. It premiered at the 2008 Pusan International Film Festival. It was shot entirely in the southern city of Johor Bahru, mostly at the low-cost Bukit Chagar flats that have since been demolished to make way for development. The film also screened in several other film festivals such as the 2008 Vancouver International Film Festival, the 2008 Jakarta International Film Festival and 2009 BAFICI It screened in limited release in Malaysia through Golden Screen Cinemas International Screens from 25 September 2008.

Unusually for a Malaysian film Punggok Rindukan Bulan contains no music or songs.

The film was produced with the aid of grants from Multimedia Development Corporation and Krishen Jit Astro fund.

== Synopsis ==
Sidi, a boy in secondary school, and his father Adman both cope with the sudden absence of a key female figure in their life. In an apparently unconnected story, a boyish young woman returns to photograph the places that were the background of her earlier years.

== Themes ==
The film is set in the border town of Johor Bahru, Malaysia. The literal meaning of the title, a Malay saying, is "the owl misses the moon", offering a reflection on longing.

== Cast ==
Saeful Nazhif Satria ... Sidi
Sahronizam Noor ... Adman
Maya Karin ... Umi
Salehuddin Abu Bakar ... Lelaki Kurang Kemas
Sharifah Amani ... Riza

== Crew ==
Azharr Rudin ... Writer/Director/Editor
Amir Muhammad ... Producer
Tan Chui Mui ... Executive Producer
Sidi Saleh ... Director of Photography
Hairul Askor Salleh ... Assistant Director/ Production Manager

== Reception ==
The work of Azharr Rudin in the film was described as "reveal(ing) a remarkable gift of insight. He has some special feeling for things, people and events, at least those he chooses to treat in his first feature film set in a decrepit housing project in Johor Baharu, near Singapore." The film was also described as "tow films in one" with "a mysterious syntax" and an "introspective film that captures the lives of those living in a run-down low-cost flat slated for demolition in Johor Bahru” and “uplifting”, “poignant”, “mysterious”, “daring”, “astonishing”, “authentic” and “evocatively captures sense of liminality.” This Longing was also noted for its depiction of the lives of working class in Asia.
