= Note (film) =

2015 film

- Malay: NOTA
- Directed by: Yasu Tanaka
- Written by: Yasu Tanaka; Yasuhiko Tanaka
- Screenplay by: Yasu Tanaka
- Based on: Bako National Park
- Produced by: Bea Tanaka
- Starring: Hans Isaac; Maya Karin; Rin Izumi; Ramli Hassan
- Cinematography: Maximilian Schmige
- Edited by: Yasuhiko Tanaka
- Music by: Christopher Higgs
- Production company: 42nd Pictures
- Distributed by: Empire Film Solution
- Release date: 13 August 2015
- Running time: 94 minutes
- Country: Malaysia
- Language: Malay
- Budget: RM 1.8 million

Note also known as NOTA (English: Note) is a 2015 Malaysian Malay-language psychological thriller film written and directed by Yasu Tanaka. This was also his directorial debut in Malay film. The film was produced by his wife Bea Tanaka under the production company 42nd Pictures. The film stars Hans Isaac in the male lead role, Maya Karin in the female lead role, while Ramli Hassan and Rin Izumi play supportive roles. The music for the film is scored by Christopher Higgs and editing is handled by Yashiko Tanaka.

The film was released on 13 August 2013 and received mixed reviews from the audience but was declared as a box office failure. Despite this, the film is still rated as one of the greatest films to have made in Malaysian cinema and was also nominated as one of the best films at the 28th Malaysian Film Festival and eventually won the Best Screenplay Award during the film festival.

== Plot ==
The film depicts the story of a couple living in Kuala Lumpur; Erin (Maya Karin) and Kamal (Hans Isaac). They have plenty of marital problems and argue very often between themselves. They decide to go to Bako National Park to resolve their relationship, only for some unexpected consequences to aggravate the couple's situation.

== Cast ==
- Hans Isaac as Kamal
- Maya Karin as Erin
- Ramli Hassan as Jemat (boatman)
- Rin Izumi as Mayumi

== Production ==
Tanaka incurred about 1.8 million Malaysian Ringgit to create this film. The making of the film was filmed and shot in Sarawak in April 2013 and in Kuala Lumpur in May 2013. The production of the film ended up within 26 days but underwent delays due to other unknown reasons before its original release on 13 August 2015.

== Release ==
The film had its theatrical release in Malaysia and in United States on 13 August 2015. The film did not do well at the box office as expected due to its high initial cost and managed to collect only RM 80,000. The film was also released nearly 3 months after the untimely death of actor Ramli Hassan on 7 May 2015, who was part of the cast.
