= Paloh Street Mosque, Ipoh =

Mosque in Kinta, Perak, Malaysia

Paloh Street Mosque
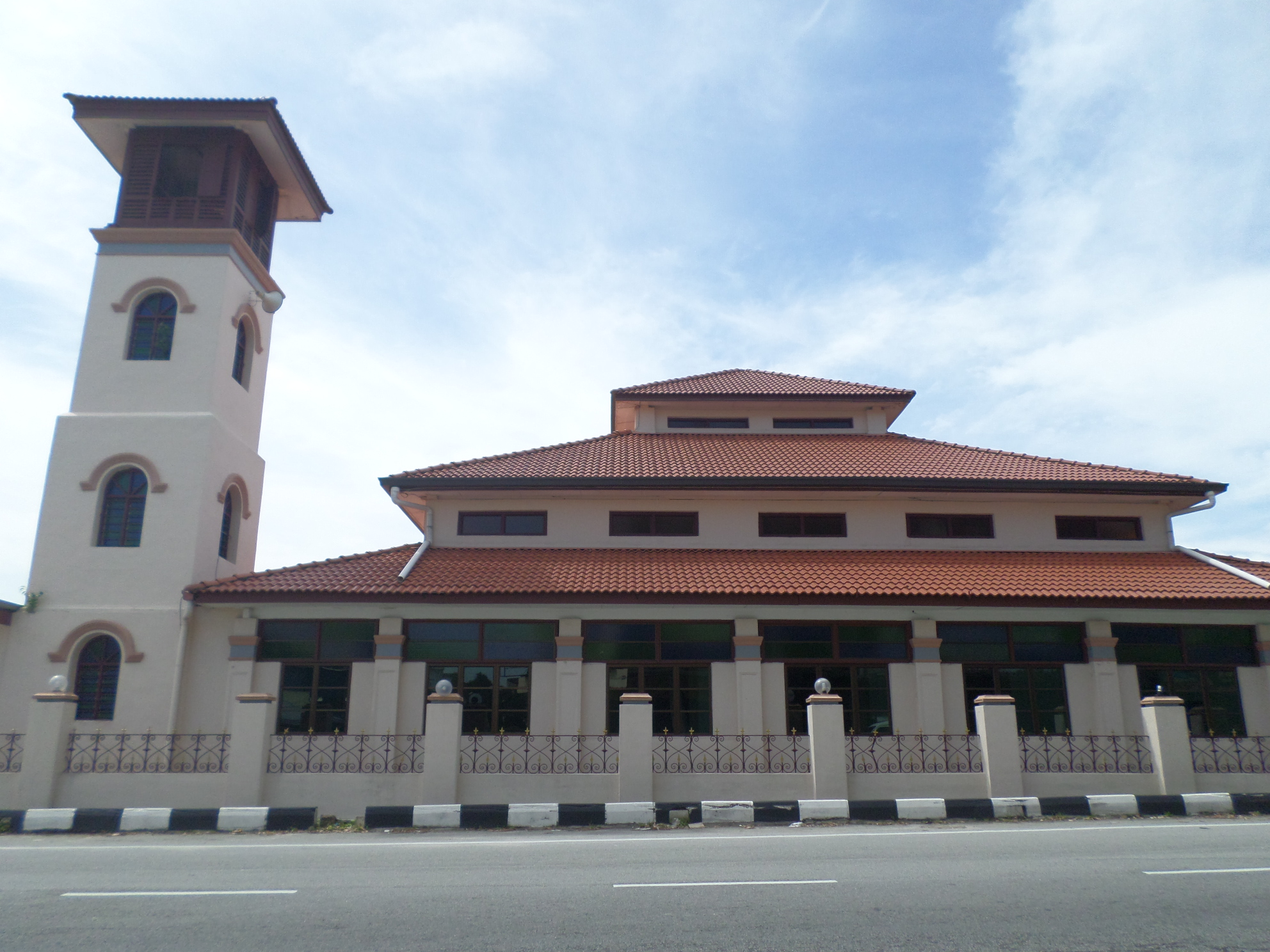

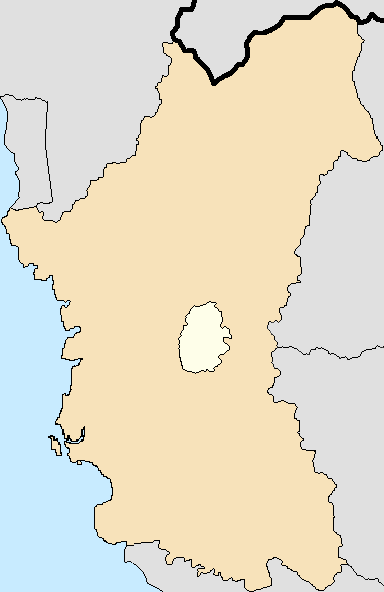
- Location within Ipoh

Religion
- Affiliation: Islam
- Branch/tradition: Sunni

Location
- Location: Ipoh, Perak, Malaysia
- Interactive map of Paloh Street Mosque
- Coordinates: 4°35′23.8″N 101°04′37.3″E

Architecture
- Type: mosque
- Completed: 1912

Kg. Paloh Mosque is one of the oldest mosques in Ipoh, Perak, Malaysia. Located at Jalan Datoh, it was built in 1912 by Wan Muhammad Saleh, superintendent of Penghulus and assistant collector of Land Revenue during the Frank Swettenham administration.

The construction was funded by 2 prominent wealthy people at that time, one of them is Long Kassim. As an appreciation to him, the administration of the mosque is handled by Long Kassim's grandchildren until now.

The present structure has been extensively renovated but the original five-tiered minaret and mausoleum of its founder still remain in their original form. The mausoleum features a two-tiered gabled roof and its enclosure comprises a half-wall with balustrades. It stands next to the mosque.

== See also ==
- Islam in Malaysia
