= Kala Malam Bulan Mengambang =

- Directed by: Mamat Khalid
- Written by: Mamat Khalid
- Screenplay by: Mamat Khalid
- Produced by: Gayatri Su-Lin Pillai
- Starring: Rosyam Nor; Umie Aida; Farid Kamil
- Edited by: Affandi Jamaludin
- Music by: Ahmad Kamal Baharudin
- Production company: Tayangan Unggul
- Release date: January 10, 2008 (Malaysia)
- Running time: 110 minutes
- Country: Malaysia
- Language: Malay
- Budget: MYR 1.4 million

Kala Malam Bulan Mengambang (English: When the Full Moon Rises) is a 2008 Malaysian Malay-language neo-noir satirical comedy film directed by Mamat Khalid starring Rosyam Nor, Umie Aida and Farid Kamil. This film released on 15 January 2008.

== Plot ==
Saleh (Rosyam Nor), a reporter, finds himself stranded in a village after his car tire is punctured by a strange keris. During his stay, he meets the beautiful and mysterious Cik Putih (Umie Aida), sister to the mechanic Jongkidin, and is immediately smitten. At the same time, he also finds out that when there is a full moon, a man would disappear from the village. Rumours start to spread about a pontianak who is killing their men for their blood. Saleh decides to stay a little longer to solve the mystery, even after being advised to leave the village by Doreen (Iman Corinne Adrienne). Who has been kidnapping the men? What is the secret of the village?

== Cast ==
- Rosyam Nor as Saleh
- Umie Aida as Cik Putih
- Farid Kamil as Jongkiding
- Avaa Vanja as Miss Rogayah
- Iman Corinne Adrienne as Doreen Chua
- Bront Palarae as Mahinder Singh
- M. Hitler Zami as Sergeant Ismail
- Adam Corrie as Correy
- Soffi Jikan as Communist Leader
- David Teo as Hotel Owner
- Ruminah Sidek as Old Woman
- Soya as Fuad
- Kay Maria as Miss Rogayah's mother
- Dewa Sapri as Miss Rogayah's father
- Kuswadinata as Dr. Rushdi
