= Duyung =

2008 film

- Promotional poster.
- Directed by: Abdul Razak Mohaideen
- Written by: Azhari Zain
- Produced by: Abdul Latiff Mohaideen
- Starring: Maya Karin; Saiful Apek
- Cinematography: Erman Maharam
- Edited by: Faizul A. Rashid
- Production company: KRU Films
- Distributed by: KRU Studios
- Release date: 6 March 2008 (Malaysia)
- Running time: 91 minutes
- Country: Malaysia
- Language: Malay
- Budget: MYR 1.8 million
- Box office: MYR 4,679,000

Duyung (English: Mermaid) is a Malaysian Malay-language fantasy romantic comedy film that was released on 6 March 2008. The film is directed by Abdul Razak Mohaideen and produced by KRU Films (now known as KRU Studios) in association with Grand Brilliance and Line Clear Motion Pictures. It stars Saiful Apek as a kind-hearted man who encounters a mermaid, portrayed by Maya Karin.

== Plot ==
The story is set on the east coast of Sabah. Jimmy is a young man who spends his days cleaning the rubbish in the sea village that he lives. He refuses to do any work other than caring for the environment, which makes him an outcast and laughing stock among the villagers. His only friend is Orix.

Jimmy wants to marry his childhood sweetheart, Aspalela, who returns his feelings. He asks Aspalela's father, Wan Pagek, for Aspalela's hand in marriage, but Wan Pagek declares that he has to have land of his own before he can marry her. Jimmy builds a floating island out of discarded rubbish, on which he builds a small hut. This amuses Wan Pagek and displeases Kordi, another man who wants to marry Aspalela.

One night, Jimmy is woken up by a mermaid named Puteri. She explains that she has been watching Jimmy for some time, and to show her appreciation for Jimmy's efforts in cleaning the village, she has been helping fortify his floating island. Jimmy boasts to the entire village that he has met a mermaid, but when Puteri refuses to surface when called, Jimmy is declared a crazy liar and disowned by his father.

When Puteri returns to visit Jimmy, she reminds him that their friendship is supposed to be a secret. She takes him to her home in an underwater cave, which is filled with pirate's treasure. Puteri explains that she is lonely, and has developed feelings for Jimmy. However, Jimmy explains that he is in love with Aspalela, but he cannot marry her because he has no money. Puteri offers to give her treasure to him, but he turns it down. After Jimmy returns to his floating island, he wakes up the next morning and finds that Puteri has left two boxes of treasure for him. Jimmy flaunts his newfound wealth and gains the favour of all the villagers and Aspalela's father.

Kordi is suspicious of Jimmy's good fortune and goes to his island, where he captures Puteri. He places her in a cage and charges the villagers money to see her. Jimmy's father sees the mermaid and realises that his son isn't crazy. Jimmy, Orix, Aspalela, Jimmy's parents and Aspalela's parents work together to free Puteri. After getting away from Kordi, Puteri wishes Jimmy happiness with Aspalela, and swims off into the ocean.

In an epilogue set three years later, Jimmy and Aspalela are married, Kordi is working for them, the village is prosperous, and the villagers work for Jimmy in monitoring the environment. Jimmy explains in voice-over that he has not seen Puteri since their goodbye and doesn't expect to see her ever again. Puteri is briefly shown secretly visiting the village with a merman by her side.

== Cast ==
- Maya Karin as Puteri, the Duyung
- Saiful Apek as Jimmy
- Yassin Yahya as Orix, the ape
- Yasmin Hani as Aspalela
- Awie as Kordi
- Raja Noor Baizura as Mak Onah
- Abu Bakar Omar as Pak Keoi
- Hafidzuddin Fazil as Wan Pagek
- Rosnah Mat Aris as Mak Tungkik
- Iqbal Mydin as Apai
- Azhari Mohd Zain as Joli

== Soundtrack ==
Track list:

1. Aspalela - Saiful Apek
2. Hampir Ke Situ - Mendua
3. Kenapa Singgah Kalau Tak Masuk - Flava
4. Bila Terasa Rindu - Dafi
5. Datanglah Kekasih - Pianka
6. Teramat Sangat - Aznil Haji Nawawi
7. Jikalau Aku - Ezlynn
8. Masih Mencari - X Factor (Group)
9. Gadis Misteri - Indigo (Group)
10. Yahoo - All Casts of Duyung

== Publishing ==
Duyung is the first Malaysian filming underground filming. Nearly 40 percent of the seasons involve the seafloor and the rest still do not run out of the sea. [6] Shooting takes 25 days in Sipadan Island, Sabah. Maya Karin did all the rounds in the sea without the help of multiple stunt techniques. [7]

The publishing company, Grand Brilliance Sdn Bhd targets a collection of RM10 million with a screening of 59 theaters across Malaysia, the largest number in the history of Malay movie. [8] However, other filmmakers described the target as impossible as Saiful Apek's comedic habits and CGI's not so attractive.

== Promotion ==
The movie sponsor, DiGi, spent RM1.5 million for promotional purposes. Various contests for free Duyung tickets are also held. 1 minute trailers in Malay and English are distributed alongside 30 and 10 promotional clips while also in Malay and English have been aired on television

== Reception ==
Despite being screened during the election day, fearing to dump the visit to the cinema, however, during the first week of the show, Duyung filed RM2.7 million, ranked second on the weekly best-selling movie charts in Malaysian cinemas that week, only trailing 10,000 B.C

== Criticism ==
Although the director of the film, A. Razak Mohaideen wants to get out of the habit of his earlier films that have got great criticism, the movie Duyung is said to be still not running away from the typical film director. The construction of the character is said to be very synonymous with non films and easy storyline and light comedy still used.

== Sound Track ==
The Duyung film soundtrack album was launched on January 24, 2008 along with the launch of the Duyung novel. This album features 10 soundtrack tracks.

List of Sound Track

1. Aspalela - Saiful Apek
2. Hampir Ke Situ - Mendua
3. Kenapa Singgah Kalau Tak Masuk - Flava
4. Bila Terasa Rindu - Dafi
5. Datanglah Kekasih - Pianka
6. Teramat Sangat - Aznil Haji Nawawi
7. Jikalau Aku - Ezlynn
8. Masih Mencari - X Factor
9. Gadis Misteri - Indigo
10. Yahoo - Duyung & Dugong

== Duyung Novel ==
Duyung novel has been published which contains stories cited from the Duyung film. It has been adapted from Azhari Zain's original idea by KRU Script Panel and Meor Shariman. The novel was launched on January 24, 2008 and is available at RM14.90.
