= Maya Karin =

Actress, television host and singer

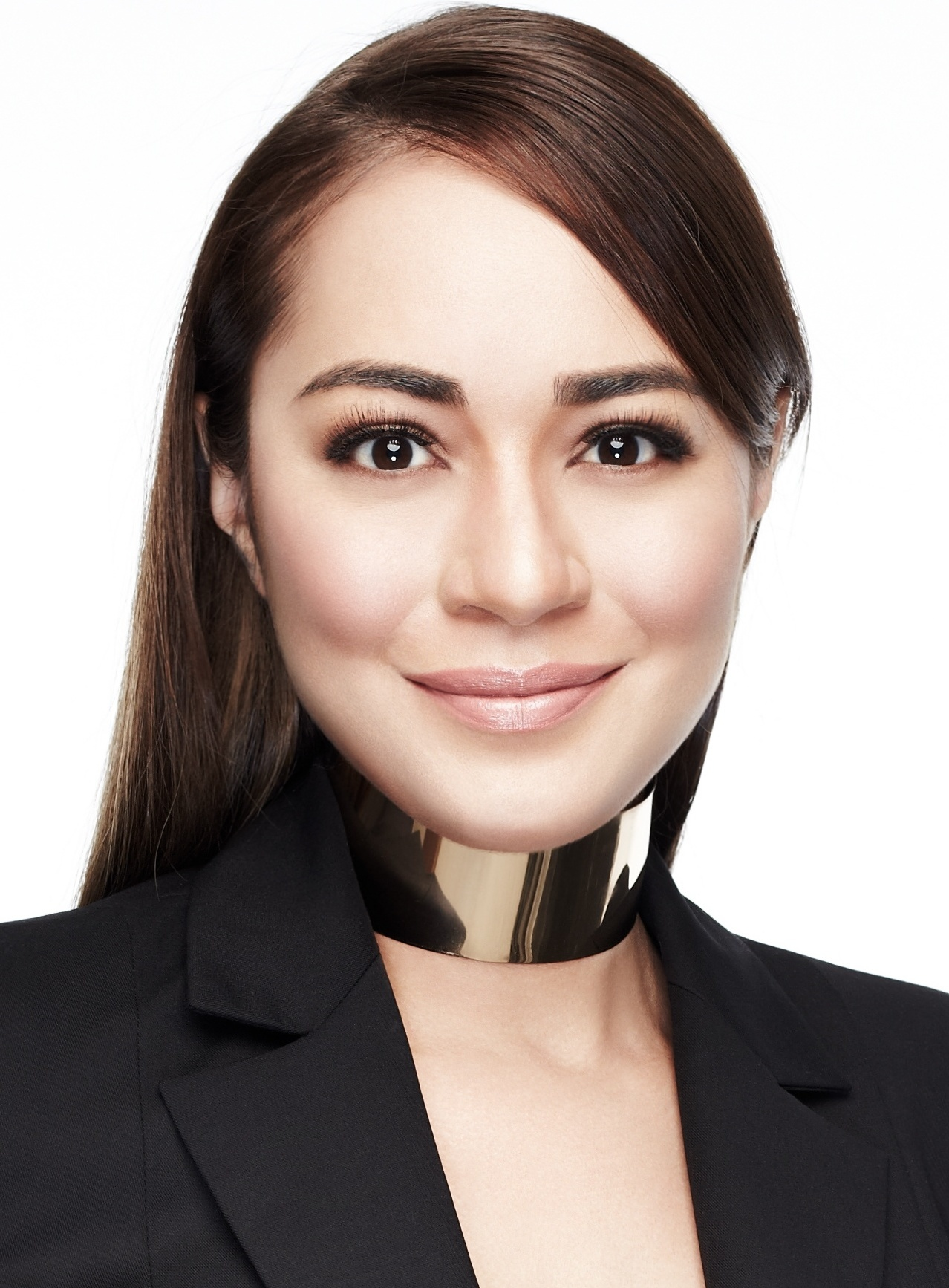
- Karin in 2019
- Born: Maya Karin Roelcke; 29 October 1979 (age 46); Bayreuth, Bavaria, West Germany
- Education: Limkokwing University of Creative Technology, Cyberjaya, Malaysia
- Occupations: Actress; television host; singer
- Years active: 1999–present
- Spouse: Steven David Shorthose (m. 2008; div. 2010)
- Musical career
- Genres: Pop; R&B
- Instrument: Vocals
- Label: Warner Music Malaysia

Maya Karin Roelcke (born 29 October 1979) is a Malaysian film actress, television host and singer, known for Pontianak Harum Sundal Malam (2004), Anak Halal (2007), Ombak Rindu (2011) and Munafik 2 (2018). She holds the Malaysia Film Festival record for the actress with most nominations in the category of Best Actress Award (11), and is among the few actresses who have won the award twice. She is also the first of only two Malaysian actresses to have won the Best Actress Award at the Asia-Pacific Film Festival.

== Early life ==
Roelcke was born on October 29, 1979 in Bayreuth, Bavaria, West Germany. She is of German, Malay, Chinese and Indian Muslim descent. Her father is from Germany and her mother is from Teluk Air Tawar, Penang, Malaysia. She lived most of her teenage years in different parts of Indonesia, finally ending up in Kuala Lumpur, Malaysia when she was 17. She is the eldest of three siblings. She graduated from Limkokwing University of Creative Technology Kuala Lumpur in Media and Marketing studies before starting her acting career.

== Career ==
=== 2000–2004 ===
In 2000, she was cast as a television show host for Malaysia's TV3 lifestyle entertainment programme Wavelength, which began her mainstream career. She was soon cast in her first film role as one of the leads in Aziz M. Osman's Seri Dewi Malam alongside popular actor Hairie Othman. Later that year, she played a girl living in a rural village in her second movie No Problem which was a box office failure. She won the New Popular Artist Award at Malaysia's Anugerah Bintang Popular Berita Harian and the Anugerah Media Hiburan in 2001. In 2003 she was cast in a supporting role in, Mr. Cinderella 2.

In mid-2004, she was cast by director Shuhaimi Baba in the lead role in Pontianak Harum Sundal Malam. She won the Best Actress Award at the 49th Asia Pacific Film Festival 2004 in Fukuoka, Japan. She also received her first nomination for Best Actress in a Leading Role at the Malaysia Film Festival.

=== 2005–2010 ===
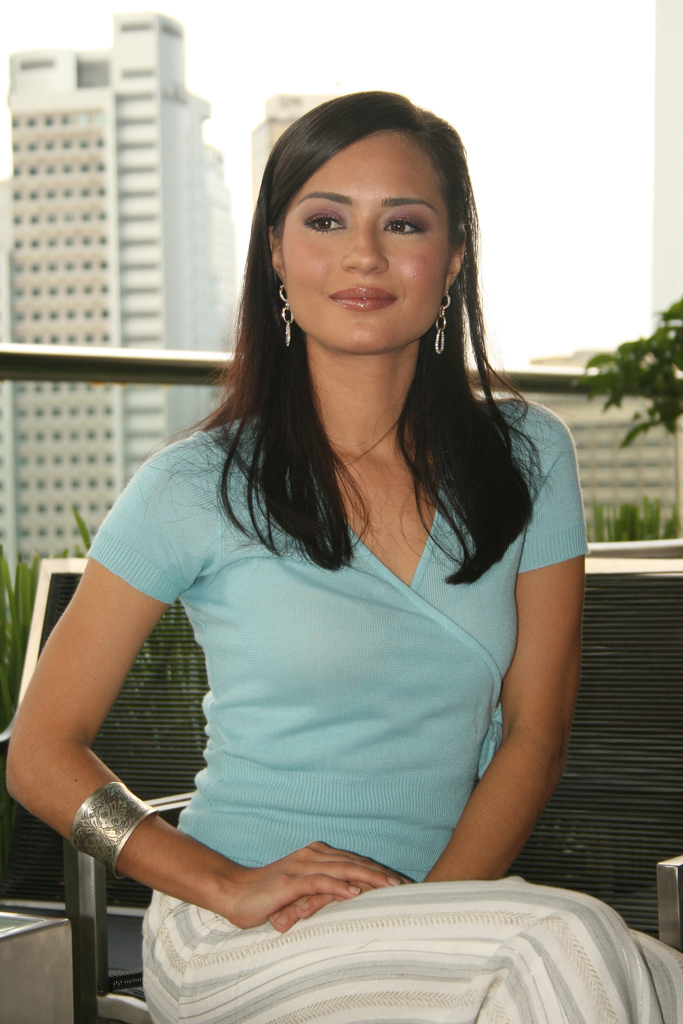
Karin c. 2000s

In 2005, Roelcke reprised her role as the lead in Pontianak Harum Sundal Malam II and won Best Actor (male/female) at the Estepona Fantasy and Terror Film Festival 2005 in Málaga, Spain and, her second nomination for Malaysia Film Festival's Best Actress. Roelcke also won the Most Popular Actress (Film) Award at the Anugerah Bintang Popular Berita Harian 2005.

Despite her growing film career, Roelcke continued her involvement in television, and in 2004 she was invited by Channel [V] International to join their VJ team. In 2006, she was voted Best VJ in Star Buzz Editor's Choice Awards 2006. Other shows that she has hosted are the bridal programme 'Ratu Sehari' (Queen for a Day) in 2004 for Malaysia's Astro Ria channel and the travelogue programme 'Beauty Secrets From The East' in 2005 for TV3.

In 2007, Roelcke played a variety of lead roles in Pesona Pictures' Waris Jari Hantu and 1957: Hati Malaya and Tayangan Unggul's Anak Halal and continued to receive nominations for various awards. Karin won Best Actress Awards at Malaysia Film Festival and Anugerah Oskar Malaysia in 2008 for her portrayal of a tomboy girl in Anak Halal.

In 2008 she began to play comedy film roles. Beginning with Duyung in 2008, she played the title role of a mermaid, performing all the underwater scenes on her own in the open sea of Sipadan Island. In the same year, she received her second Most Popular Actress (Film) Award at the Anugerah Bintang Popular Berita Harian 2008. In 2009, she starred in Pisau Cukur, a comedy film about gold diggers where she performed more comedy scenes than her role in Duyung.

In 2010 in the romantic comedy movie Cun, she played a famous entertainment show host who falls in love with a man from a rural village alongside Remy Ishak.

=== 2011–present: Career challenge and further success ===
In November 2011, Roelcke had her biggest commercial success Ombak Rindu, where she played a young women from a rural village struggling with life and love For this she won the Best Actress Award at both the Anugerah Skrin and Malaysia Film Festival in 2012 and her third Most Popular Actress (Film) Award at the Anugerah Bintang Popular Berita Harian 2011.

After Lagenda Budak Setan 2, she appeared in Sejoli, wher she portrayed a girl looking for her true love, gaining her Best Actress award in Comedy Role at the second Anugerah Lawak Warna in 2014. Next were Jwanita and Nota, a collaboration between local and Japanese film producers.

In 2017, Roelcke appeared in the horror film, Munafik 2 directed by Syamsul Yusof, becoming the highest-grossing Malaysian film to date with a record of RM48 million in sales, also gaining commercial success in Indonesia, Brunei, and Singapore as well.

== Musical career ==
In 2002, Roelcke recorded her debut music album, Erti Cinta, and was nominated for the Best New Singer and Best Video awards at the Anugerah Industri Muzik. Her second album is Bukan Qalamaya (2004). In 2013, Roelcke signed with Warner Music Malaysia returning after 9 years with the single "Bintang Syurga". Her next album Teka-Teki was released on 24 March 2014.

== Advertising ==
Roelcke has advertised various products starting with Wella in 2001, followed by Pantene, Yishion in 2003, Celcom in 2006, L'Oréal Paris Malaysia in 2007. Other endorsements include Tag Heuer, Nescafe, Innershine, Dulux, Vono. Sorella and GreenTech Malaysia.

== Activism ==
Having been influenced by her father, Roelcke has been very passionate about the environment from a young age. Roelcke is actively involved in various campaigns for environmental and animal protection and often works with the Malaysian Nature Society and World Wildlife Fund (WWF).

She also has her own campaign drive MayaLovesNature, the first two of which involved working with 22,000 schoolchildren from 14 different primary schools targeting awareness of excessive use and waste of plastic bags. 2012 sees her as ambassador for the governments new recycling initiative and as spokesperson for the Geological Institute of Malaysia.

In January 2019, Roelcke was appointed as the ambassador for River of Life, a public outreach programme initiated by Malaysia's Ministry of Federal Territories which aims to transform the Klang River into a vibrant and livable waterfront of high economic value. Her popular #MayaRiverChallenge began when Karin uploaded a photo of her dipping her head into a stream to social media, which was then mimiced by many others.

== Personal life ==
Roelcke married British teacher and educator Steven David Shorthose, or his Islamic name, Muhammad Ali, on 14 August 2008 in Bellagio, Italy and later held a reception at the Forest Research Institute Malaysia (FRIM) in Kepong on 26 August. However, their relationship lasted for only two years after they divorced on 16 July 2010.

== Filmography ==
=== Film ===
Year	Title	Role	Notes
1999	Entrapment	Guests	Cameo, Hollywood debut film
2001	Seri Dewi Malam	Seri	
2001	No Problem	Rosnah	
2003	Mr. Cinderella 2	Anis	
2004	Pontianak Harum Sundal Malam	Meriam / Maria / Pontianak	
2004	7 Perhentian	Dr. Maya	
2005	Pontianak Harum Sundal Malam 2	Meriam / Maria / Pontianak	
2007	Waris Jari Hantu	Tina	
2007	1957: Hati Malaya	Salmi / Normala	
2007	Anak Halal	Johanna	
2008	Duyung	Puteri / Duyung	
2008	Punggok Rindukan Bulan	Umi	
2009	Pisau Cukur	Bella	
2010	Magika	Bunian	
2010	Cun!	Luna Latisha	
2011	Hikayat Merong Mahawangsa	Goan Villager	
2011	Ombak Rindu	Izzah	
2012	Lagenda Budak Setan 2: Katerina	Katerina	
2014	Sejoli: Misi Cantas Cinta	Gina	
2014	Lagenda Budak Setan 3: Kasyah	Katerina	
2015	Nota	Erin	
2015	Jwanita	Jwanita	
2018	Munafik 2	Sakinah	
2020	Bulan dan Pria Terhebat	Tony	
2020	Alone	Medical Analyst	Hollywood film
2021	Olympic Dream	Mak Cik Fatimah	
2022	Alam: Kingdom of Plants	Meela	
2022	Abang Long Fadil 3	Ejen Maya	
2024	The Experts Selamatkan Raya	Dancer	Short film, uncredited
2024	The Experts	Miranda Rahman	
2025	Telaga Suriram	Rohaya	
2025	Duyung: Legenda Aurora	Puteri / Duyung	

=== Television series ===
Year	Title	Role	TV channel
2007–2008	Anak Pontianak	Meriam / Maria / Pontianak	TV3
2009	Waris	Tina	TV2

=== Television ===
Year	Title	Role	TV channel	Notes
2000–2001	Wavelength	Host	TV3	
2004	Ratu Sehari	Host	Astro Ria	
2004–2007	Channel V	Host	Channel V	
2005	Beauty Secrets from the East	Host	TV3	
2010–2011	Nona	Host	TV3	
2017	JoMovie	Guest	Astro Citra	
2017	The Apartment - Rising Stars	Guest	Sony Channel	
2017	Sepahtu Reunion Live	Guest	Astro Warna	Episode: "Lada Putih Lada Hitam"
2018	Sepahtu Reunion Live	Guest	Astro Warna	Episode: "Dunia Baru"
2018	Bocey & Friends Live	Guest	Astro Warna	

=== Music videos ===
Year	Song title	Role	Notes
2008	"Here in My Home"	Herself	A special song for Malaysian Artistes For Unity

=== Theatres and musicals ===
Year	Title
1999	In the Mind's Eye
2009	Natrah
2010	Natrah 2
2013	SuperMokh The Musical 1
2014	SuperMokh The Musical 2

== Discography ==
- Erti Cinta (2001)
- Bukan Qalamaya (2004)
- Teka-Teki (2014)
