= Abdul Razak Mohaideen =

Malaysian film director

Yang Berbahagia Prof. Madya Dato' A. Razak Mohaideen
- Born: Abdul Razak Mohaideen; 22 January 1965 (age 61); Penang, Malaysia
- Occupations: Director, screenwriter
- Years active: 1997–present
- Spouse: Datin Nazeera Ahmed Bazari (m. 1996)
- Children: 2
- Relatives: Abdul Latiff Mohaideen (brother); Abdul Shukor Mohaideen (brother)

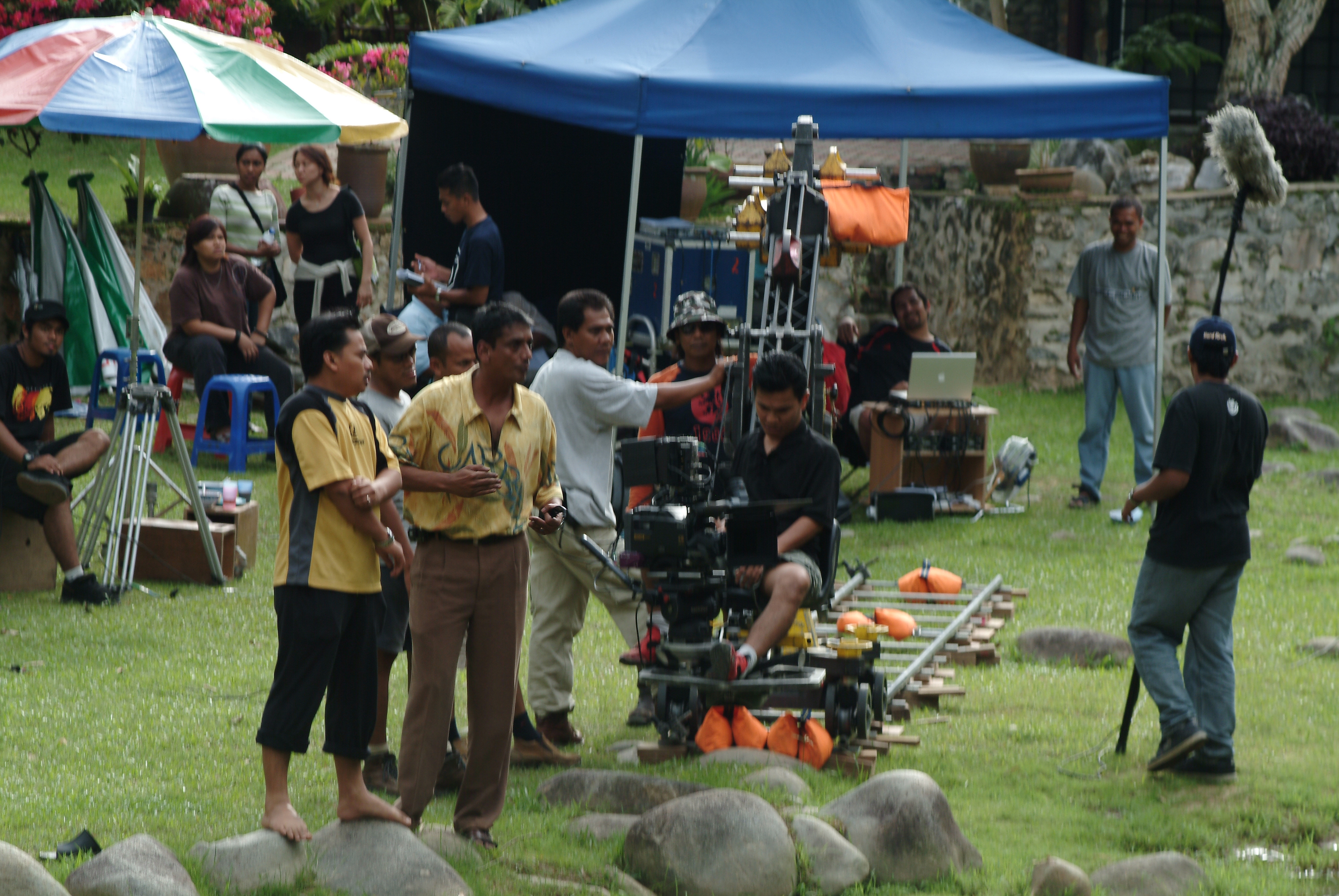
Abdul Razak bin Mohaideen on set

Abdul Razak bin Mohaideen (born 22 January 1965) is a Malaysian film director. He has directed around 40 titles since 1997.

== Early life ==
He was born in Pulau Pinang on 22 January 1965. Razak obtained his Master of Art in Film and Television Fiction from Sheffield Hallam University, United Kingdom in the year 1997. After obtaining a bachelor's degree in journalism, Razak started as a script writer before moving on to directing. He debuted as a director with the film Gemerlapan in the same year. He became a lecturer in Universiti Teknologi MARA since 1991, eventually serving as the Dean of Faculty of Film, Theatre & Animation there. He is also one of the lecturers involved in the setting up of its Faculty of Performing Arts in 1998. In October 2016, he obtained his PhD in management from the University Utara Malaysia.

He is married to Nazeera Ahmed Bazari and has two children.

== Honours ==
He won a Special Jury Award for Portraying Social Community Culture and was the Producer of one of the Best Short Films at the 2007 RTM Short Film Awards. In 2011, he has been awarded National Academic Award (Creative) and received Malaysia Book of Records for directing most number of film by an academic.

Penang

- Officer of the Order of the Defender of State (DSPN) – Dato' (2014)

== Filmography ==
=== Film ===
Year	Title	Credited as		Notes
Year	Title	Director	Writer	Notes
1997	Gemerlapan	Yes	Yes	
2002	Anak Mami the Movie	Yes	Yes	
2002	Mami Jarum	Yes	Yes	
2003	Mistik	Yes	Yes	
2003	Mami Jarum Junior	Yes	Yes	
2003	Cinta Kolestrol	Yes	Yes	
2003	Jutawan Fakir	Yes	Yes	
2004	Kuliah Cinta	Yes	Yes	
2004	Hingga Hujung Nyawa	Yes	Yes	
2004	7 Perhentian	Yes	Yes	
2004	I Know What You Did Last Raya	Yes	No	
2004	Tangkai Jering	Yes	Yes	
2005	Potret Mistik	Yes	Yes	
2005	Cinta Fotokopi	Yes	Yes	
2005	Lady Boss	Yes	Yes	
2005	Anak Mami Kembali	Yes	Yes	
2006	Bujang Senang	Yes	Yes	
2006	Nana Tanjung	Yes	Yes	
2006	Main-Main Cinta	Yes	Yes	
2007	Otai	Yes	Yes	
2007	Nana Tanjung 2	Yes	Yes	
2008	Duyung	Yes	No	
2008	Cinta U-Turn	Yes	Yes	
2009	Sifu dan Tongga	Yes	Yes	
2009	Rasukan Ablasa	Yes	Yes	
2009	Skrip 7707	Yes	Yes	
2010	2 Hati 1 Jiwa	Yes	No	
2010	4 Madu	Yes	Yes	
2011	Ratu the Movie	Yes	Yes	
2011	Raya Tak Jadi	Yes	Yes	
2012	Bujang Terlajak	Yes	Yes	
2012	Ngorat	Yes	No	
2014	Mana Mau Lari	Yes	Yes	
2015	Chowrasta	Yes	Yes	
2016	Anak Mami Nasi Kandaq	Yes	Yes	
2016	Muluk Dan Konco: Hero Malaya	Yes	Yes	Completed
2017	Soulmate Hingga Jannah	Yes	Yes	
2018	Badang	Yes	Yes	
2020	Syif Malam Raya	Yes	Yes	
2021	Selamat Hari X Jadi	Yes	Yes	
2021	Rumah Madu Ku Berhantu	Yes	No	
2022	Hantu Tenggek	Yes	No	
2023	Sumpahan Malam Raya	Yes	No	
2025	Duyung: Lagenda Aurora	Yes	Yes	
TBA	Pukau	Yes	No	Pre-production

=== Television series ===
Year	Title	Credited as		TV channel
Year	Title	Director	Writer	TV channel
2008	Anak Mami	Yes	Yes	TV9

=== Telemovie ===
Year	Title	Credited as		TV channel
Year	Title	Director	Writer	TV channel
2007	Sangga Saadah	Yes	Yes	TV3
2023	Raya Heist	Yes	No	Tonton
