= Hans Isaac =

Malaysian director, former actor, producer, and politician (born 1971)

Gerald Hans Isaac DIMP
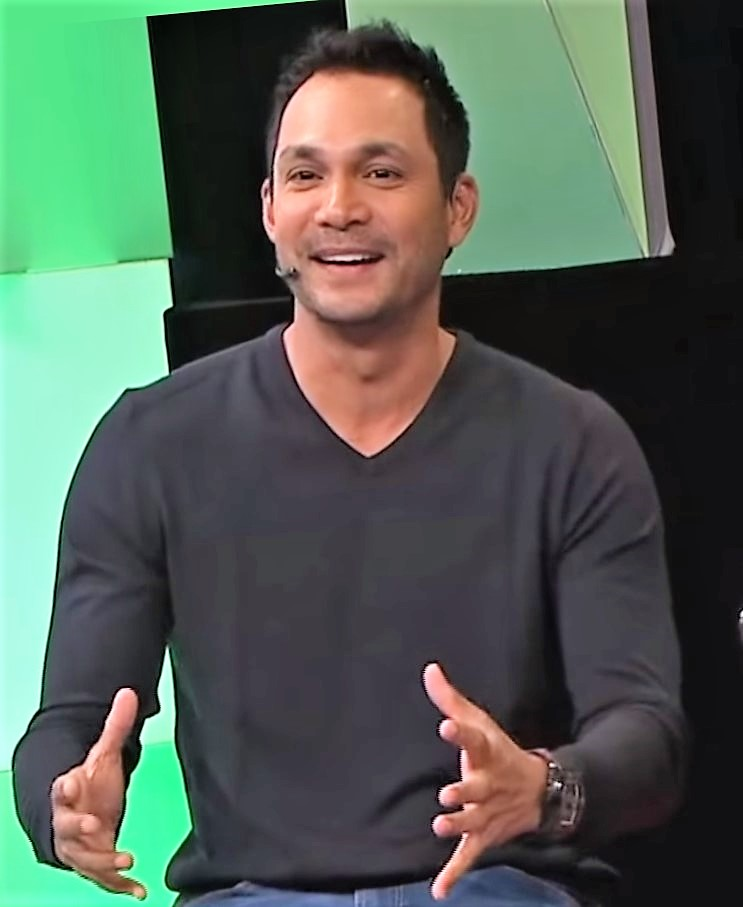
- Isaac on MeleTOP in 2016
- Born: Gerald Hans Isaac; 20 August 1971 (age 55); Johor Bahru, Johor, Malaysia
- Education: St. John's Institution, Kuala Lumpur, Malaysia
- Occupations: Actor; producer; director
- Years active: 1995–2021 (as actor); 2020–present (as politician)
- Parents: Edward Anthony Gerald Isaac (father); Carmina Anciano Isaac (mother)

Chairman of National Film Development Corporation Malaysia (FINAS)
- In office 10 April 2019 – 22 May 2020
- Preceded by: Samsuni Mohd Nor
- Succeeded by: Zakaria Abdul Hamid

Gerald Hans Isaac (born 20 August 1971) is a Malaysian former actor, producer, director, and politician.

On 10 April 2019, he was appointed as the Chairman of the National Film Development Corporation Malaysia (FINAS), and resigned after a year. In December 2021, Hans announced he was retiring from acting after more than two decades.

== Personal life ==
Hans Isaac was born on 20 August 1971 in the Sultanah Aminah General Hospital in Johor Bahru to a Filipino mother, Carmina Anciano Isaac, and Indian-Kristang father, Edward Anthony Gerald Isaac from Malacca, a naval officer.

The Isaac family lived in Johore for eight years before transferring to the KD Sri Rejang base in Sibu, Sarawak. They eventually settled in Kuala Lumpur when Hans was around eight to nine years old. His father had been appointed as an aide for the Yang Di-Pertuan Agong at the National Palace in Jalan Istana, and was there until his retirement. Isaac attended the St. John's Institution, in Kuala Lumpur. He holds a bachelor's degree in Business Administration from the Singapore Institute of Commerce and a bachelor's degree in Hotel Management from Stamford College, Malaysia.

In February 2017, he became engaged to Aileen Gabriella Robinson, a former Miss Tourism International winner in 2011. On 30 October 2017, he announced that the marriage would not take place.

Isaac has been a member of the People's Justice Party (PKR) since 2020 and was a Central Leadership Council Member (MPP) from 2022 to 2025.

== Filmography ==
=== Film ===
Year	Title	Role	Notes
1995	Ringgit Kasorrga	Khal	Debut film appearances
1995	Child's Play		Short film
1995	Amok	Rem	
1996	Scoop	Norman	
1997	Gemilang	Yusry	
1997	Hanya Kawan	Hans	
2003	City Sharks	Chief	
2003	Laila Isabella	Johan	
2004	Buli	Roy	
2004	Cinta Luar Biasa	Adam	
2005	Baik Punya Cilok	Jerry	
2006	Buli Balik	Roy	Also as producer
2006	Persona Non Grata	Ben	Also as co-producer
2007	Qabil Khushry Qabil Igam	Qabil Khushry	
2008	Cuci	Khai	Also as director, writer, producer and cinematographer
2008	Tipu Kanan Tipu Kiri	Remo Rizal	
2008	Los dan Faun	Los	
2009	Duhai Si Pari-pari	Host	Cameo appearance
2010	Miss You like Crazy	Mir	Filipino Film
2011	Misteri Jalan Lama	Indra	
2013	Awan Dania The Movie	Host	
2013	Langgar	Jimi	
2013	Lemak Kampung Santan	Ridzuan	Also as director, writer, producer and editor
2013	Papadom 2	Qib	
2015	Nota	Kamal	
2017	J Revolusi	Bookkeeper	Cameo appearance

=== Television series ===
Year	Title	Role	TV channel	Notes
2002	Maya Mira	Johan	TV3	
2004	Sephia	Haykal	TV3	
2004	Cinta.Com		Mediacorp Suria	
2004	Kutub Utara, Kutub Selatan		TV2	
2005	Simbiosis		TV3	
2008	Ali Din		TV3	
2008	Awan Dania (Season 1)		Astro Ria	
2009–2010	Cuci-Cuci Services	Khai	TV2	Producer
2011	7 Gerhana		Astro Prima	
2013	Dahlia	Razman	Astro Mustika HD	
2014	Oh My English! (Season 3)		Astro TVIQ	Episode: "You Jelly, Henry?"

=== Telemovie ===
Year	Title	Role	TV channel
1995	Amer Amera	Amer	TV3
1996	Putih Gaun Pengantin		TV3
1996	YB & Thuraya		TV1
1997	Anak Abah		TV1
1998	Kugiran	Bad	TV3
1999	Minah Meenachi		TV3
2013	Cahaya Insaniah		TV1

=== Television show ===
Year	Title	Role	TV channel	Notes
1999	Golf Fever	Host	TV2	
2017	Konsert Komedi	Himself - Week 5 (Baik Punya Cilok)	Astro Warna	Special appearance
2017	Lawak Ke Der! Coverline	Himself (Host)	Astro Warna	

=== Other appearances ===
Year	Title	Notes
2013	Lawak Ke Der? 2	Stand-up comedy show presented in Istana Budaya

== Honours ==
- Pahang
  - Knight Companion of the Order of the Crown of Pahang (DIMP) – Dato' (2016)

Preceded by Samsuni Mohd Nor	National Film Development Corporation Malaysia; Chairman; 8 April 2019 – 22 May 2020	Succeeded by Zakaria Abdul Hamid
