= Mamat Khalid =

Malaysian film director (1963–2021)

- مامات خالد
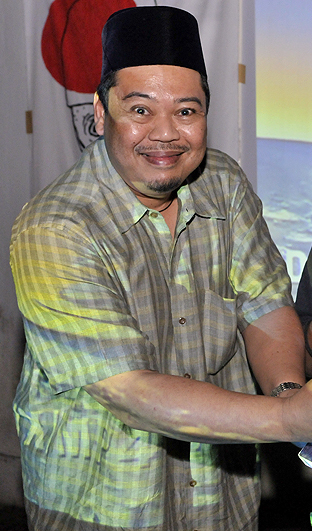
- Mamat in 2008
- Born: Mohamad bin Mohamad Khalid; 6 April 1963; Ipoh, Perak, Federation of Malaya (now Malaysia) (Note: He was born five months before Federation of Malaya became the present day Malaysia on 16 September 1963.)
- Died: 24 October 2021 (aged 58); Slim River Hospital, Slim River, Perak, Malaysia
- Resting place: Masjid Paloh Muslim Cemetery, Ipoh, Perak
- Occupations: Film director, screenwriter, producer, actor
- Years active: 1996–2021
- Spouse: Hasmah Hassan (m. 1986–2021)
- Children: 5
- Parent(s): Mohamad Khalid Mohd Noh (father; deceased); Nor Azian Said (mother; deceased)
- Relatives: Dato' Lat (brother)

Mohamad Mohamad Khalid, known professionally as Mamat Khalid (6 April 1963 – 24 October 2021) was a Malaysian screenwriter, film director, producer and actor. He was the younger brother of cartoonist Datuk Mohammad Nor Khalid, better known as Lat.

Apart from his career as a film director, Mamat was a founder and owner of his cafe, Sarang Art Hub which is located at Tanjung Malim and opened in 2016.

== Life and career ==
Mamat was born on 6 April 1963 in Ipoh, Perak and is a youngest of five children born to Mohd Khalid Mohd Noh and Nor Azian Said. His older brother is renowned Malaysian cartoonist, Lat. As a young boy, he used to go to the cinemas every other day to catch the latest movies. Unfortunately, his hobby did not resonate well with his father, who banned him from frequenting cinemas even on his deathbed (because his father died at the age of 52, when he was 10 years old in 1973). However, that did not break the young Mamat's passion for films.

Before venturing into film-making, Mamat worked in a government office. He was a fan of rock music, having joined an amateur band named Drop Out in 1986 where he was the band's keyboardist. The experiences that he had gone through during this phase inspired him to write and direct his 2005 film Rock, in which its commercial success led into three sequels - Rock Oo...! (2013), Rock Bro! (2016) and Rock 4: Rockers Never Dai (2020).

He cited the late director, musician cum legendary actor P. Ramlee as one of his filmmaking heroes or idols.

== Personal life ==
Mamat married Hasmah Hassan on 14 April 1986, a week after his 23rd birthday and the couple are blessed with five children, three sons and two daughters. His fourth child, Amen Khalid has since followed his footsteps in the film industry.

== Illness and death ==
On 22 April 2017, Mamat was admitted to the Intensive Care Unit (ICU) of the Ampang Puteri Hospital after complaining of breathing difficulties at about 3 in the morning after having some coffee with his friends. He was believed to have extreme fatigue after attending the preview session of his latest movie, Lebuhraya Ke Neraka in Bukit Bintang. Mamat however remained in stable condition albeit under a doctor's monitoring due to his high blood pressure.

He died on 24 October 2021 at the age of 58 due to heart disease at the Slim River Hospital at 12.30 am. Mamat reportedly collapsed at his Sarang Art Hub restaurant in Tanjung Malim. He was the buried at the Masjid Paloh Muslim Cemetery in Kampung Kuchai, Ipoh at about 2.25 pm, right after Zuhr prayers and just before Asr.

== Filmography ==
=== Film ===
Year	Title	Credited as			Role	Notes
Year	Title	Screenwriter	Director	Actor	Role	Notes
2003	Lang Buana	Yes	Yes	No	—N/a	
2004	Puteri Gunung Ledang	Yes	No	No	—N/a	
2005	Rock	Yes	Yes	No	—N/a	
2006	Man Laksa	Yes	Yes	No	—N/a	
2006	Tipah Tertipu The Movie	Yes	No	Yes	Film Director	Cameo
2007	Zombi Kampung Pisang	Yes	Yes	Yes	MK	
2008	Kala Malam Bulan Mengambang	Yes	Yes	No	—N/a	
2008	Cicak Man 2: Planet Hitam	No	No	Yes	Man Malay	Special appearance
2008	Dunia Baru The Movie	No	No	Yes	Tauke Stesen Minyak	Special appearance
2009	Papadom	No	No	Yes	Dato' Mamat Khalid	Special appearance
2009	My Spy	No	No	Yes	Man Malay	
2010	Estet	Yes	Yes	No	—N/a	Also as producer
2010	Hantu Kak Limah Balik Rumah	Yes	Yes	No	—N/a	
2013	Husin, Mon dan Jin Pakai Toncit / Hantu Kak Limah 2	Yes	Yes	No	—N/a	
2013	Rock Ooo...!	Yes	Yes	No	—N/a	
2013	Bro, Nampak Motor Gua?	No	No	Yes	Tan Sri Bakhtiar	
2014	Apokalips X	Yes	Yes	No	—N/a	
2014	Zombi Kilang Biskut	Yes	Yes	Yes	Kulop	Special appearance
2014	Amir dan Lokman Pergi ke Laut	Yes	Yes	No	—N/a	
2014	Ribbit	No	Yes	No	—N/a	Animated film malay version
2014	Terbaik Dari Langit	No	No	Yes	Lorry Driver	Cameo
2015	Rumah Pusaka Di Simpang Jalan	Yes	Yes	No	—N/a	
2015	Werewolf Dari Bangladesh	Yes	Yes	No	—N/a	
2015	Usop Wilcha Menghonjang Makhluk Muzium	Yes	Yes	No	—N/a	
2016	Rock Bro!	Yes	Yes	No	—N/a	As producer
2016	Pak Man Degil	Yes	Yes	No	—N/a	Short film
2017	Lebuhraya Ke Neraka	Yes	Yes	No	—N/a	
2018	Hantu Kak Limah	Yes	Yes	No	—N/a	
2020	Rock 4: Rockers Never Dai	Yes	Yes	No	—N/a	As producer
2020	Manap Karaoke	Yes	Yes	No	—N/a	
2021	18 Puasa di Kampong Pisang	Yes	Yes	No	—N/a	As producer
2021	Kampong Pisang Musikal Raya Istimewa	Yes	Yes	No	—N/a	
2021	Mat Bond Malaya	No	No	Yes	Himself	Cameo
2021	Kampong Pisang Kita Setandan	Yes	Yes	No	—N/a	Short film
2021	Budak Kripto	No	No	Yes	Himself	Special appearance
2022	Kampong Pisang Berbuah Dua Kali	Story	No	No	—N/a	
2022	Rajawali	Yes	Yes	No	—N/a	He directed it with S. Amin Shahab

=== Television series ===
Year	Title	Credited as			Role	TV channel	Notes
Year	Title	Screenwriter	Director	Actor	Role	TV channel	Notes
1997–2000	Kampung Boy	Yes	No	No	—N/a	Astro Ria	Animated series; as script translator
1999–2005	Spanar Jaya	No	No	No	—N/a	NTV7	Concept
2011	Cer Citer	Yes	Yes	No	—N/a	Astro Warna	
2020–2021	Kampong Pisang Bersiri-siri	Yes	Yes	No	—N/a	Astro Citra	As producer
2021	Klik Rider	No	Yes	No	—N/a	Astro Warna	As executive producer

=== Television movie ===
Year	Title	Credited as			Role	TV channel
Year	Title	Screenwriter	Director	Actor	Role	TV channel
1996	Namaku Yassin	Yes	Yes	No	—N/a	TV3
1997	Mengejar Bintang	No	Yes	No	—N/a	TV3
1998	Rombongan Cik Kiah ke Sukan Komanwel	Yes	Yes	No	—N/a	NTV7
1999	Pukul 2 Petang	Yes	No	No	—N/a	NTV7
1999	Arbaie Bujang Kembali	Yes	Yes	No	—N/a	TV3
2000	Mat Nor Kushairi & The Velvet Boys	Yes	Yes	No	—N/a	NTV7
2000	Pinang Durian	Yes	Yes	No	—N/a	TV3
2004	15 Puasa	Yes	Yes	No	—N/a	NTV7
2007	Aku Bukan Buaya	Yes	Yes	No	—N/a	NTV7
2014	Rombongan Cik Kiah ke Kelana Jaya	Yes	Yes	No	—N/a	Astro First Exclusive
2015	Idris MLM	Yes	Yes	No	—N/a	Astro Warna
2017	16 Puasa	Yes	Yes	No	—N/a	Astro First Exclusive
2017	Semerah Darah	Yes	Yes	No	—N/a	Astro Citra
2019	17 Puasa	Yes	Yes	No	—N/a	Astro First Exclusive
2025	Bendasing	Yes	No	Yes	Tok Wali	TV3

=== Television ===
Year	Title	Role	TV channel	Notes
2021	Memoir Selebriti: Journey To Stardom - Mamat Khalid	Himself	Astro Prima	Documentary, as executive producer
2022	Warong Pak Jabit	Himself	Astro Ria	As executive producer

== Awards and nominations ==
Year	Awards	Category	Nominated work	Result
2001	Anugerah Skrin 2001	Pengarah Terbaik (Best Director)	Pinang Durian	Won
2005	Festival Filem Malaysia ke-18	Lakonlayar Terbaik (Best Screenplay; with Saw Teong Hin)	Puteri Gunung Ledang	Won
2006	Festival Filem Malaysia ke-19	Lakonlayar Terbaik (Best Screenplay)	Man Laksa	Nominated
2006	Festival Filem Malaysia ke-19	Cerita Asal Terbaik (Best Original Story)	Man Laksa	Nominated
2007	Festival Filem Malaysia ke-20	Anugerah Khas Juri (Special Jury Awards)	Zombi Kampung Pisang	Won
2008	Festival Filem Malaysia ke-21	Pengarah Terbaik (Best Director)	Kala Malam Bulan Mengambang	Won
2008	Festival Filem Malaysia ke-21	Lakonlayar Terbaik (Best Screenplay)	Kala Malam Bulan Mengambang	Nominated
2008	Festival Filem Malaysia ke-21	Cerita Asal Terbaik (Best Original Story)	Kala Malam Bulan Mengambang	Nominated
2010	Festival Filem Malaysia ke-23	Anugerah Khas Juri (Special Jury Award)	Estet	Won
2010	Festival Filem Malaysia ke-23	Pengarah Terbaik (Best Director)	Estet	Nominated
2010	Festival Filem Malaysia ke-23	Lakonlayar Terbaik (Best Screenplay)	Estet	Nominated
2010	Festival Filem Malaysia ke-23	Cerita Asal Terbaik (Best Original Story)	Estet	Nominated
2010	Festival Filem Malaysia ke-23	Penataan Seni Terbaik (Best Art Directing)	Estet	Nominated
2011	Festival Filem Malaysia ke-24	Pengarah Terbaik (Best Director)	Hantu Kak Limah Balik Rumah	Nominated
2011	Festival Filem Malaysia ke-24	Cerita Asal Terbaik (Best Original Story)	Hantu Kak Limah Balik Rumah	Nominated
