= Julia Ziegler =

Malaysian actress and model

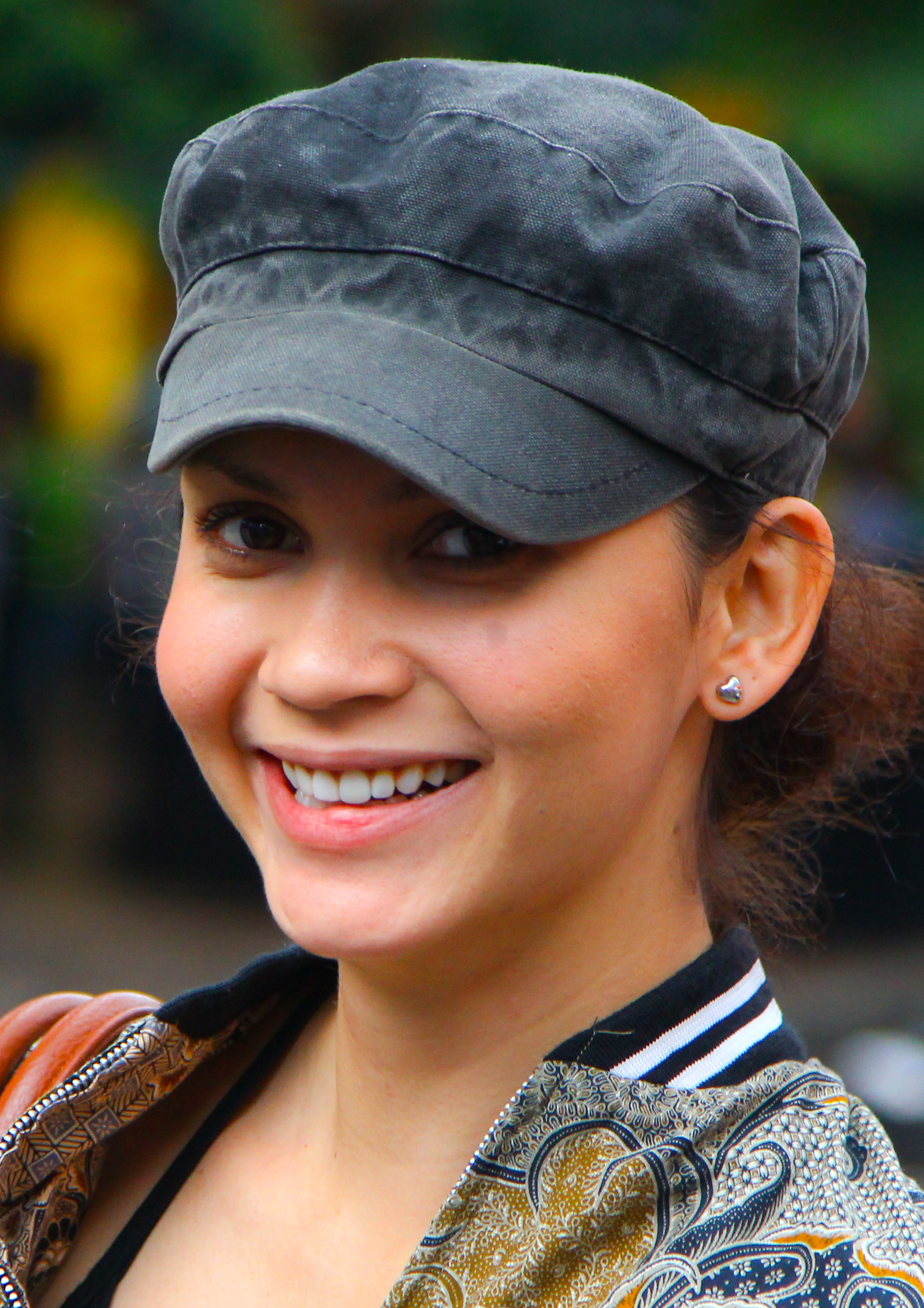
- Ziegler in 2011
- Born: 21 May 1984 (age 41); Kuala Lumpur, Malaysia
- Occupation(s): Actress, model
- Years active: 2007–present
- Spouse: Johan (m. 2017)
- Children: 2

Julia Ziegler (born 21 May 1984) is a Malaysian actress and model. Ziegler got her start as a model and actress for Malaysian TV commercials. She has appeared on the covers of local magazines and has also acted in television series' for the Malaysian market.

== Early life ==
Ziegler was born in Kuala Lumpur and raised in Ampang, Selangor. Her mother is Malaysian and her father is American.

== Personal life ==
Julia married Johan, a mechanical engineer, on 1 January 2017.

== Filmography ==
=== Film ===
- Jangan Tegur (2009)

=== Dramas ===
- KL Menjerit The Series (2008)
- Qanun 99 (Episode 5)
- Tanah Kubur Season 6 (Episode Dosa Karib)
- Bahagia Kasihmu (2017)
- Selamat Malam Tan Sri (2018)

=== Programme ===
- Meja Bulat Sepahtu (2017) – guest
