= List of Malaysian films of 2019 =

This is a list of Malaysian films produced and released in 2019. Most of these films are produced in the Malay language, but there also a significant number of them that are produced in English, Mandarin, Cantonese and Tamil.

== 2019 ==
=== January – March ===
Opening		Title	Director/	Cast	Notes	Ref.
J A N U A R Y	17	Felina	Sandosh Kesavan	Raja Ilya, Shafiq Jamil, Nur Qistina Raisah, Zaidi Omar	Janu Talkies	
J A N U A R Y	17	Lease of Life	Lai Kim Koon	Henry Thia, Lim Ching Miau, Lyndie Ong, Chloe Chan	Cao Min Pictures; Mandarin-language film	
J A N U A R Y	24	XX-Ray 3	Aziz M. Osman	Izzue Islam, Nonny Nadirah, Dazrin Kamarudin, Jalaluddin Hassan, Saiful Apek	Empire Film Solution	
J A N U A R Y	31	Bella & Jamie	Ghaz Abu Bakar	Liyana Jasmay, Juliana Evans, Izzue Islam, Khir Rahman, Sharifah Nadia, Dynas Mokhtar	United Studios	
F E B R U A R Y	5	A Journey of Happiness	JY Teng	Joyce Cheng, Lo Hoi-pang, Lin Min Chen, Ah Niu, Alex Lam, Jerry Lamb	MM2 Entertainment; Cantonese-language film	
F E B R U A R Y	5	Amazing Spring	Nick Wong	Cedric Loo, Sharon Yeung Pan Pan, Law Kar Ying, Jack Lim	GSC Movies; Cantonese-language film	
F E B R U A R Y	21	Misteri Dilaila	Syafiq Yusof	Zul Ariffin, Elizabeth Tan, Rosyam Nor, Sasqia Dahuri	Skop Production, Astro Shaw	
F E B R U A R Y	28	Satte	Ray Dinesh David	Haridhass S., Lingeshvaran Maniam, Kuben Mahadevan, Senthil Kumaran Muniandy, Sangkari Elancheran	Dove Eyes Entertainment; Tamil-language film	
M A R C H	7	Kuttram Seiyel	Venkatesh, Bharathirajaa	Bose Venkat, Vijith, Dr S Selvamuthu, Dheena	Astro Vaanavil; Tamil-language film	
M A R C H	14	Bikers Kental 2	Mohd Helmi Yusof	Zizan Razak, Afdlin Shauki, Awie, Amerul Affendi, Bront Palarae	TGV Pictures	
M A R C H	21	Upin & Ipin: Keris Siamang Tunggal	Ahmad Razuri Roseli, Adam Amiruddin, Syed Nurfaiz Khalid Syed Ibrahim	Asyiela Putri, Ahmad Mawardi, Mohd Amir Asyraf, Ernie Zakri	GSC Movies	
M A R C H	28	Red Storm	Michael Chuah	Henry Thia, Zhang Bo Nan, Li AI Jin, Michael Chuah, Henley Hii	Mega Films Distribution; Mandarin-language film	

=== April – June ===
Opening		Title	Director	Cast	Notes	Ref.
A P R I L	4	Tiada Tajuk	Asmawi Ani	Mawi, Hazama Azmi, Along Cham, Joey Daud	Empire Film Solution	
A P R I L	11	Fly by Night	Zahir Omar	Sunny Pang, Jack Tan, Fabian Loo, Bront Palarae, Eric Chen, Frederick Lee, Ruby Yap, Joyce Harn	Skop Production; Mandarin-language film	
A P R I L	11	Bu	Jeany Amir	Remy Ishak, Nadiya Nissa, Dian P. Ramlee, Iedil Putra, Nadia Brian, Rashidi Ishak, Mawar Rashid, Wan Hanafi Su	MM2 Entertainment	
A P R I L	18	Homestay: Permainan Maut	Kay Shan	Ruminah Sidek, Sofea Shaheera, Asward Naslim, Kay Shan, Siva Garuda	SB Production	
A P R I L	18	Two Sisters	James Lee	Emily Lim, Lim Mei Fen	MM2 Entertainment; Mandarin-language film	
M A Y	30	Supermum	Wong Kai Hiung	Eliza Wong, Remon Lim, Joey Leong	GSC Movies; Mandarin-language film	
J U N E	27	Azhaggiye Thee	Loganathan	Saresh D7, Latha, Gunasegaran, Yuvaraj	ATMovies; Tamil-language film	

=== July – September ===
Opening		Title	Director	Cast	Notes	Ref.
J U L Y	18	Kali Muni Tharisanam	DTS Indran	Ben G, Nithya Sree, Jeganathan	D' Cinema; Tamil-language film	
A U G U S T	8	BoBoiBoy Movie 2	Nizam Abdul Razak	Nur Fathiah Diaz, Fadzli Mohd Rawi, Dzubir Mohammed Zakaria, Wong Wai Kay, Nur Sarah Alisya Zainal Rashid, Yap Ee Jean	Astro Shaw	
A U G U S T	15	Warkah	Mohd Soupi Zami	Namron, Syazwan Zulkifli, Isyariana, Mohd Wafiy, Puteri Rayyana Rayqa	Empire Film Solution	
A U G U S T	22	Kron	Mohd Soupi Zami	Zahiril Adzim, Dayana Roza, Aman Graseka, Opie Zami	Empire Film Solution	
A U G U S T	29	Sangkar	Kabir Bhatia	Zul Ariffin, Remy Ishak, Mira Filzah, Nik Adam Mika	Astro Shaw, Primeworks Studios, MM2 Entertainment	
S E P T E M B E R	5	Wangi	Mohd Latiff Zami	Erra Fazira, Sharnaaz Ahmad, Nabila Huda, Syazwan Zulkifli	Empire Film Solution	
S E P T E M B E R	12	Dendam Pontianak	Glen Goei, Gavin Yap	Nur Fazura, Remy Ishak, Hisyam Hamid, Shenty Feliziana, Namron, Tony Eusoff, Nadiah M. Din, Nadia Aqilah	Primeworks Studios	
S E P T E M B E R	12	M for Malaysia	Dian Lee, Ineza Roussille	Mahathir Mohamad	Astro Shaw	
S E P T E M B E R	12	Suatu Ketika	Prakash Murugiah	Namron, Pekin Ibrahim	GSC Movies	
S E P T E M B E R	19	Venpa	K. Kavi Nanthan	Yuvaraj Krishnasamy, Agalyah Maniam, Thevaguru Suppiah, Nanthini Sugumaran	DMY Creation; Tamil-language film	
S E P T E M B E R	26	Motif	Nadiah Hamzah	Sharifah Amani, Rosyam Nor, Iedil Putra, Taqim Zaki	Empire Film Solution	
S E P T E M B E R	26	Ennaval	Saran Z	C.Kumaresan, Sangeeta Krishnasamy, Vasanth Sarna	D'Cinema; Tamil-language film	

=== October – December ===
Opening		Title	Director	Cast	Notes	Ref.
O C T O B E R	3	Hero: Jangan Bikin Panas	Azizi Chunk	Hisyam Hamid, Bell Ngasri, Mark Adam	Empire Film Solution	
O C T O B E R	3	Walk with Me	Ryon Lee Eng Keong	Michelle Wai, Alex Lam, Qi Yuwu, Anna Ng, Richard Ng	MM2 Entertainment; Cantonese-language film	
O C T O B E R	10	Geran	Areel Abu Bakar	Namron, Fatimah Abu Bakar, Khoharullah, Feiyna Tajudin	Empire Film Solution	
O C T O B E R	17	Kolong	Zul Abu Kassim	Wan Raja, Luthya Sury Widjaja, Annie Arifin	Empire Film Solution	
O C T O B E R	24	Anak Perjanjian Syaitan	Helmi Yusof	Nadzmi Adhwa, Chacha Maembong, Jasmin Hamid, Shahrulnizam Noor	Empire Film Solution	
O C T O B E R	31	Pusaka	Razaisyam Rashid	Syafiq Kyle, Mimi Lana, Hafidz Roshdi, Farhanna Qismina, Ogy Ahmad Daud, Faizal Hussein	Astro Shaw	
O C T O B E R	31	7 Hari: Kisah Cinta Langkawi	Anwardi Jamil	Josiah Hogan, Mark Adam, Peter Davis, Chi Azim	Early Bird Productions	
N O V E M B E R	14	Pulanaivu	Shalini Balasundaram, Sathish Natarajan	Shaila V, Shalini Balasundaram, Kabil Ganesan, Saran Manokaran	Story Films; Tamil-language film	
N O V E M B E R	14	KL Vampires	Daven Raghavan	Raja Ilya, Josiah Hogan, Aeril Zafrel, Reen Rahim, Doni Alamsyah, Pablo Amirul	Empire Film Solution	
N O V E M B E R	21	Wira	Adrian Teh	Hairul Azreen, Henley Hii, Fify Azmi, Dain Said, Ismi Melinda, Yayan Ruhian, Hilal Azman	Astro Shaw, GSC Movies	
N O V E M B E R	21	M.O.X: Misi Operasi X	Zulkeflie M. Osman	Ebi Kornelis, Tya Arifin, Shareeta Selvaraj, Wan Adi Rafuan Datuk Rashid	Empire Film Solution	
N O V E M B E R	28	Ejen Ali: The Movie	Usamah Zaid	Ida Rahayu, Azman Zulkiply, Noorhayati Maslini, Shafiq Isa, Fadhli Shafian	Primeworks Studios	
N O V E M B E R	28	Metro Maalai	Haren Kaveri & Shobaan Pillay	Sathish, Punitha Shanmugam, Karishma, Kumanavannan, Kay	Victory Film Production; Tamil-language film	
D E C E M B E R	5	Garang	T. Kanageswaran	Pablo Amirul, Ahmad Maembong, Osman Omar, John Elijah, Chacha Maembong, Emma Maembong	Skop Production	
D E C E M B E R	5	Lucky Blockchain	Bryan Gao	Benny Sii Tuong Kai, Koe Yeet, Liaw Ket Henn, James Wong	Mega Films Distribution; Mandarin-language film	
D E C E M B E R	12	Banglo No. 99	Khir Mohd Noor	Johan As'ari, Yusof Haslam, Hafeez Mikail, Bkay Nair, Camelia Natasya kmn, Harun Hashim	Xtreme 5 Productions	
D E C E M B E R	19	Busut Bonang	Khalid Nadzri	Nadzmi Adhwa, Along Eyzendy, Jasper Supayah, Rashidah Jaafar, Sahronizam Noor, Hairi Safwan, Aloy Paradoks, Abby Nadzri	Empire Film Solution	
