= Juvana =

2013 film by Faisal Ishak

- Directed by: Faisal Ishak
- Based on: Juvana by
- Produced by: Kabir Bhatia; Mira Mustaffa; Francis Foo
- Starring: Zahiril Adzim; Johan As'ari; Syazwan Zulkifli; Sharnaaz Ahmad; Syafie Naswip; Adlin Aman Ramlie
- Edited by: Adilan Azemi
- Production company: Filmscape
- Distributed by: Juita Viden
- Release date: January 24, 2013 (Malaysia)
- Running time: 87 minutes
- Country: Malaysia
- Language: Malay
- Budget: MYR 2.08 million
- Box office: MYR 2.86 million

Juvana (English: Juvenile) is a 2013 Malaysian Malay-language action crime film based on the action drama series of the same name directed by Faisal Ishak. It was released on 24 January 2013.

== Plot ==
Picking up a few months after the end of the TV drama series "Juvana", Daim (Zahiril Adzim) is freed from the juvenile centre after being found not guilty of murdering his mother. He tries to lead a normal life in the outside world, but finds that it is vastly different from life in juvenile prison. Daim begins to attend high school in hopes of finishing his SPM. He also finds a job at the brick factory to support himself. However, in school, he is bullied by the other students and does not have any friends besides Sara (Shera Aiyob). Further, the school guard who knows about his status as an ex-juvenile convict is always watching him. Everything that goes wrong in school is blamed on Daim as well...

== Cast ==
- Johan As'ari as Botak
- Zahiril Adzim as Daim
- Syazwan Zulkifly as Apek
- Adam Shahz as Ayam
- Khairul Mohamed as Komeng
- Megat Fazeril Faiz as Kicap
- Idzham Ismail as Panjang
- Sharnaaz Ahmad as Lan Todak
- Syafie Naswip as Jamal
- Adlin Aman Ramlie as Tuan Ali
- Rahhim Omar as Principal
- Shera Aiyob as Sara
- Accapan as Prison barber
- Raffi Khan as Tuan Amirul
- Kenji Sawahi as Bricks factory boss
- Nabila Huda as Prison nurse
- Sara Ali as Juriah
- Bront Palarae as Warden Raja Khairul
- Shukri Yahaya as Fit
- Riki Rikando as Gajah
- Khairul Mohamed as Komeng
- Muhammad Syafiq Ikmal as Gaban
- Helmi Hakim as Abe
- Nurin Misha as Apek's mother
- Amirul Aiman as Lan

== Sequels ==
Two sequels called Juvana 2: Terperangkap Dalam Kebebasan, 2015 and Juvana 3: Perhitungan Terakhir, 2016, have since been released.
