= Azmyl Yunor =

Malaysian singer

- Born: Mohd Azmyl bin Md Yusof; 17 January 1977 (age 49)
- Origin: Kuala Lumpur, Malaysia
- Genres: Folk rock, lo-fi, experimental rock
- Occupations: Singer-songwriter, musician, multi-instrumentalist, writer
- Years active: 1997–present
- Labels: Rapidear, Troubadours
- Website: https://azmyl.bandcamp.com

Azmyl Yunor (born Mohd Azmyl Md Yusof; 17 January 1977 in Kuala Lumpur) is a Malaysian independent English and Malay language singer-songwriter, multi-instrumentalist, academic and writer. He is also a journalist and filmmaker by training.

His works have ranged from folk-country singer-songwriter styles to experimental guitar improvisations to punk and indie-noise rock, solo and with various bands he has founded and recorded with. All of his solo recordings are released on his own Rapidear label (his earlier obscure cassette home recordings are out of print) and Troubadours. A former street musician, he is noted for his strong songwriting and lyrics, and laidback on-stage presence yet energetic live shows. He has also composed and collaborated for film, television, theatre, dance and spoken word/poetry productions.

== Early life ==
Azmyl Yunor was born on 17 January 1977 in Pantai Medical Centre, Kuala Lumpur. He is a son of Yusof Husin, an entomology professor and Norani Abdul Samad, a microbiology professor. Yunor has a younger brother, Azree who is eight years his junior. He grew up in Adelaide, Australia where his parents continuing their studies until he was 4 years old. His family moved to Bandar Baru Bangi, Selangor when he was 12. He attended the Sekolah Rendah Kebangsaan Jalan Gurney (1).

== Music career ==
With the release of the country folk-flavored Tenets EP (2005 / produced by Azmyl Yunor & Ron Khoo) in 2005 to acclaim, he garnered wider attention of the press and established himself as one of the main movers of the burgeoning Malaysian singer-songwriter scene along with the likes of Meor Aziddin Yusof, Pete Teo, Shanon Shah and Shelley Leong. He has also recorded and released lo-fi recordings under the name Thunder Coffee Club. He was voted as one of KLue magazine's '20 Under 40 – Significant & Young Individuals or Collectives' along with the likes of Mawi, Daphne Iking, Tiara Jacquelina, and Amir Muhammad in 2006. His bi-lingual album Warga (2010 / produced by Azmyl Yunor & Ariff Akhir) saw him launch a self-funded 20-month tour to promote it. His album Wilayah (2012 / produced by Azmyl Yunor & Ron Khoo) which features his two signature songs 'Makan Gaji' and 'Anak Dara' was recorded with his touring band the Sigarettes.

He is a co-founder and member of the Experimental Musicians and Artists Co-operative Malaysia (Emacm) and a co-founder of Troubadours Enterprise, organisers of the annual singer-songwriter festival KL Sing Song from 2005 to 2009. He was also a guitarist for Damo Suzuki's Network in Malaysia for a performance together in 2010. A musical named after one of his popular songs "Something I Wrote" (directed by Mark Teh, produced by the Five Arts Centre) based on his life and works was staged in August 2013, during which he also launched a retrospective cd Revenge of the Rabak: Selected Works from the Lo-fi Years 1997–2005 comprising selected songs from his lo-fi cassette releases and the Tenets EP in its entirety. The Pedra Branca EP (2014 / produced by Ronnie Khoo, Azmyl Yunor, & Jeremy Lee), a split EP with Singaporean doom folk artist Hell Low, was released in April 2014 and they both toured Singapore and Peninsula Malaysia to promote the release.

After the disbandment of Azmyl Yunor & the Sigarettes in August 2014, he began work on a new album called Was Was and formed Azmyl Yunor & Orkes Padu with collaborator/ producer and ex-Sigarettes drummer Raje. The band released its debut single "Tanah air Ku" ("My Motherland") from the new album on Malaysia Day and made its debut festival performance at Urbanscapes 2014. He released his latest album John Bangi Blues (2020 / produced by Ariff Akhir & Azmyl Yunor) in September 2020 to positive reviews for its stripped down live electric arrangement and lyrics which explored contemporary social themes.

In 2023, Azmyl Yunor and his band, Azmyl & the Truly Asia, took the stage at Beale Street Music Festival in Memphis, Tennessee, where they performed two 65-minute sets across two days, at the Blues Tent in Handy Park, Beale Street Historic District.

He teaches the film and performing arts programmes at Sunway University.

He has also performed as a duo with fellow singer-songwriter Shanon Shah.

== Discography ==
- John Bangi Blues (2020)
- PKP EP (2020)
- Ampang Park EP (2017)
- Was Was (2015)
- The Pedra Branca EP (split EP with Hell Low) (2014)
- Revenge of the Rabak: Selected Works from the Lo-fi Years 1997–2005 (2013)
- Wilayah (2012)
- H.I.D.U.P.: Hari Ini Di Ukay Perdana (2010)
- Warga (2010)
- Tenets EP (2005)
- jikalauan EP (2004)
- ends (2003)*
- The Photocopy Album (2001)*
- PRE-DUSK GLIMMER (1999)*
- FOLK (1998)*
- Watever (1997)*

Note: * cassette only releases

== Filmography ==
- Hungry Ghost Diner (2023. Dir: We Jun Cho)- Composer
- Songs From The Mekong (2012. Dir: Steve Northcott & Gary Blanton)- Actor / Composer
- Tolong! Awek Aku Pontianak (2011. Dir: James Lee)- Cameo & Film Composer
- I Want To Remember (2011. Dir: Sherman Ong) – Film Composer
- Year Without A Summer (Berkelana) (2011. Dir: Tan Chui Mui) – Film Score/ Composer
- Rojak (2009. Dir: Suleiman Brothers) – Supporting Role
- Before We Fall in Love Again (2006. Dir: James Lee) – Film Composer
- The Flowers Beneath My Skin (2006. Dir: Kit Ong) – Film Score/ Composer
- Sehingga KL Ku Menyanyi (Until My KL Sings) (2006. Dir: Mien Lor) – Supporting Role

== Publication ==
- "Busking the Days Away" (in 'What's After SPM?', editor: Roshan Thiran. Leaderonomics Publishing, Kuala Lumpur 2011.)
- "Facing the Music: Music Subcultures and 'Morality' in Malaysia" (in 'Media, Culture & Society in Malaysia.', editor: Yeoh Seng Guan. Taylor & Francis Routledge, London 2010.)

== Television ==
- Dongibab (2022)
- Kias Ramadhan (2011)
- Anak-Anak Ramadhan (2009)

== Appearances ==
- The Maharajah Commission/Gangly Youth split 7-inch – The Maharajah Commission (2012)
- Rasa Sayang Jalan Sultan compilation – various artists (2012)
- On The Beat and Path compilation – various artists (2012)
- Radio Demokratika compilation – various artists (2011)
- Soal Kelentong Batu Cheng – Ladang Gempak (2006)
- Voices From Next Door compilation – various artists (2006)
- Mamak Conspiracy – Ben's Bitches (2006)
- It's Great To Have An EP... – Ciplak! (2006)
- Panic in the Peninsula compilation – various artists (2005)
- Come Together compilation – various artists (2005)
- National Disservice – Ben's Bitches (2004)
- Punkrawkoholic vol. 1 compilation (as Thunder Coffee Club) – various artists (2003)
- Dialogue Amoreaux – The Maharajah Commission (2003)
- The Experimental Musicians & Artists Co-op Malaysia SELECTED LIVE JAN-FEB 2003 (2003) – various artists (2003)
