= Zahiril Adzim =

Malaysian actor

- ظاهرالعظيم
- Born: Muhammad Zahiril Adzim bin Mohd Mokhtar; 23 January 1984 (age 42); Taiping, Perak, Malaysia
- Occupations: Actor, television personality
- Years active: 2006–present
- Height: 5 ft 7 in (1.7 m)
- Spouse: Shera Aiyob (m. 2011)
- Children: 1
- Website: zahiriladzim.com

Dato' Muhammad Zahiril Adzim Mohd Mokhtar (born 23 January 1984) is a Malaysian actor who is active in the fields of film, television, streaming, and theatre. He is known for his roles in films such as KAMI The Movie (2008), Senjakala (2011), Bunohan (2012), the Juvana film series (2013–2016), Pekak (2016), and One Two Jaga (2018), as well as TV dramas including Juvana (2011), Paan & Paiz (2012), Aku Bukan Bimbo (2016), and KL Gangster: Underworld (2018). Zahiril, along with Nam Ron, Syamsul Yusof, Bront Palarae, Shaheizy Sam, June Lojong, Chew Kin Wah, Maya Karin, and Puteri Balqis, was listed as one of the top 10 popular actors who gained international recognition by Harian Metro in June 2018.

== Career ==
Zahiril began his acting career in 2007 through the musical drama series KAMI The Series on 8TV, where he played the character Boy. He reprised his role in the 2008 film KAMI The Movie, which marked his first film appearance.

In 2011, Zahiril published his anthology titled Bogel Menuju Tuhan, published by Merpati Jingga. That same year, he starred in three TV dramas, including Juvana, where he portrayed Daim, a character sent to the Wira Bakti school on charges of killing his mother. Zahiril later reprised his role in the 2013 film Juvana, as well as in its two sequels: Terperangkap Dalam Kebebasan (2015) and Perhitungan Terakhir (2016).

He also appeared in the telefilm Qadr, directed by Faisal Ishak, co-starring Beto Kusyairy. The story revolves around the second chance given by God to a man after experiencing hardship. The telefilm premiered on Astro First Exclusive in February 2014.

Zahiril also ventured into television hosting, teaming up with his wife, Shera Aiyob, to co-host the talk show Masam-Masam Manis on TV AlHijrah for its third season.

From September 4 to November 1, 2017, he starred in the drama adaptation of the novel Perempuan Paling Bahagia by Syamnuriezmil, directed by Jamal Khan, where he played the role of Rafa alongside his wife, Shera.

Zahiril later starred in the 2018 film One Two Jaga, directed by Nam Ron, alongside Bront Palarae, Amerul Affendi, and Rosdeen Suboh. He portrayed the character Hussein in this film, which was his only film role in 2018. The movie was released on September 6, 2018.

Aside from acting, Zahiril is also an avid gamer and is actively involved in promoting e-Sports.

== Personal life ==
Adzim marries TV host, actress and former TV3 journalist Shera Aiyob on 20 November 2011. They have a son named Nadi Anaqi.

== Filmography ==
Key
Denotes film / dramas that have not yet been released

=== Film ===
Year	Title	Role	Notes
2008	KAMI The Movie	Boy	Win - Most Promising Actor - 22nd Malaysian Film Festival
2009	Gadoh	Khalil	
2009	Karaoke	Betik	The film received nominations for the Director's Fortnight category at the 2009 Cannes Film Festival; The film also won the Maverick Award at the 2009 Calgary International Film Festival, Canada (USD $25,000).
2009	Shortcut	Himself	Cameo
2011	Senjakala	Arman	
2011	Tolong Awek Aku Pontianak	Bob	
2011	Klip 3GP		
2012	Sesuatu Yang Tertinggal		
2012	Bunohan	Adil	
2013	Juvana	Daim	
2014	Rentap	Rashid	
2014	Terbaik Dari Langit	Warung Patrons	
2015	Juvana 2: Terperangkap Dalam Kebebasan	Daim	
2016	Redha	Faizal	
2016	Pekak	Uda	Win - Best Actor (Russia’s International Motivational Film Festival - Bridge Of Arts 2016 (IMFF 2016))
2016	Juvana 3: Perhitungan Terakhir	Daim	
2018	One Two Jaga	Hussein	Win - Best Male Supporting Film Actor (Anugerah Skrin 2019)
2019	Kron	Sham	
2019	Rise to Power: KLGU	Adi	
2021	Chomel	Imran	
2021	Ada Hantu	Aliff	
2022	Cikgu VS Hantu	Usop	
2022	Ada Hantu 2	Aliff	
2022	Siku 12: Langkah Derhaka	A-Wut	
2023	MALBATT: Misi Bakara	Dahari	
2023	Budak Flat	Aman	
TBA	Masterpiecisan	Khalil	Post-production

=== Television series ===
Year	Title	Role	TV channel	Notes
2007	KAMI - The Series	Boy	8TV	
2009	Ghost (Season 2)	Ridzuan	8TV	
2009	Waris	Finn	TV2	
2009	Merah Puteh	Merah	TV3	
2011	6 Progresif	Nik Adli	TV9	
2011	Juvana	Daim	TV3	
2011	Khurafat The Series	Johan	Astro Ria	
2012	Hanya Padamu	Bukhari	TV3	
2014	Aku Ada Wali	Naim	TV Alhijrah	
2014	Dalam Iradatmu	Ustaz Iqbal	TV Alhijrah	
2015	Sayap Jibril	Ustaz Muhammad Rayhan	Astro Oasis	
2016	Tanah Kubur (Season 15)	Hamdan	Astro Oasis	Episode: “Habil, Qabil & Iblis”
2017	Perempuan Paling Bahagia	Rafa	Astro Oasis	
2018	KL Gangster: Underworld	Adi	Iflix	
2018	Jibril	Zerkala	ntv7	
2018	Mencari Qiblat		TV3	
2020	KL Gangster: Underworld 2	Adi	WeTV	
2021	Malaysian Ghost Stories	Amri	Astro Ria	Episode: “Balan balan”
2021	Malaysian Ghost Stories	Awie	Astro Ria	Episode: “Bidan Nek Nah”
2021	Klik Rider	Ijan	Astro Warna	
2022	Scammer 2	Rudi	Astro Ria	
2022	Lockdown 2	Ramadhan	Astro Ria	
2022	SMK (season 4)	Mat Tukul	Astro Ceria	Special Appearance in the Final Episode
2023	Obsesi Dia	Rafeeq Mikhael	TV3	
2023	Nak Dengar Cerita Hantu?		DEGUP	
2024	Aku Bukan Ustazah	Dr. Omar	TV3	
2024	Andai Tiada Dia	Falah	Astro Ria	

=== Telemovie ===
Year	Title	Role	TV channel
2008	Seandainya Aku Siti	Suhaimi	NTV7
2009	Abam	Abam	TV3
2009	Seratus Hari Jadi	Amir	Astro Ria
2011	Belum Khatam Dah Khatan		Astro Prima
2011	Parit Jawa	Jalal	Astro Box Office
2012	Cinta Vlog	Azmi	TV2
2013	Qadr	Fareed	Astro First Exclusive
2013	Raya Nora Jambu		Astro Ria
2014	Pekerja Terbaik	Shaudin	TV9
2014	Talkin Di Birai Katil	Fakhri	TV1
2015	Selamat Pagi Cikgu	Cikgu Ridzuan	TVi
2015	Bila Cinta Berbunga		TVi
2015	Mahar		TV Alhijrah
2015	Aku Pilih Endingnya	Raden	TV1
2015	Calon Isteri		TV1
2015	Tanah Kubur Ummah Jahiliah	Ustaz Reyhan	Astro Oasis
2016	Awe Keno Nikah	Awe	TV1
2016	Niqabi		TV2
2017	Nak Jadi Menantu Ye?		TV1
2017	Ilham	Aidil	Astro Citra
2018	Kitab Sijjin	Adi	Astro Citra
2018	Syahadah Terakhir	Zaidi	TV3
2020	Arus Merah	Risham	Astro First Eksklusif
2020	3 Dukun Santet	Epul	Astro Citra
2021	Saka MySejahtera	Remy	Astro Citra
2023	Durjana Pujaan	Tahir	TV1
2023	Komedia	Fahim	TV2
2024	Ramadan I Miss You	Asri	TV3
