= Lim Mei Fen =

Chinese actress

- 林美芬
- Born: 29 June 1987 (age 39); Penang, Malaysia
- Occupations: Actress; Producer
- Years active: 2006–present

Lim Mei Fen

Chinese name
- Traditional Chinese: 林美芬
- Simplified Chinese: 林美芬
- Hanyu Pinyin: Lín Měifēn
- Jyutping: Lam4 Mei5 Fan1
- Hokkien POJ: Lîm Bí-hun
- Tâi-lô: Lîm Bí-hun

Lim Mei Fen (born 29 June 1987) is a Malaysian actress and producer. She debuted on 8TV's talent search program, I Wanna Be A Model in 2006. She became an actress shortly afterwards. She appeared on NTV7's game show, Deal or No Deal for two years from 2007. In 2013, she starred in Malaysia's first real movie, The Cage together Yeo Yann Yann.

Her involvement in theatre began with the mega play Takhta 3 Ratu (2014) at National Theatre as Princess Hang Li Po. She wrote, produced, and acted in 2018's National Day production Tanah Akhirku.

She was nominated as Best Actress by Kuala Lumpur Film Critics Association for her portrayal as the traumatic younger sister in James Lee's film Two Sisters (2019).

== Career ==
Returning from North California, she appeared in 8tv's I Wanna Be A Model reality show (2006). Afterwards she signed a 2-year contract as briefcase model number one in Deal or No Deal TV game show.

In 2009, she went behind the scenes and joined Juita Viden media group and created the first Hokkien drama in Malaysia. 25 episodes Home Rhythms《家缘》aired on Astro Hua Hee Dai. It was written based on Mei Fen's grandfather's story.

A call from her dad brought her back to Penang where she helped manage the family business.

In 2013, she re-debuted as a newcomer after she was offered a feature role in Back To Time FM 1970. Her credits in film include Two Sisters (2019), Hail, Driver! (2021) and The Cage (2014).

Her first appearance on stage through mega theatre came in Takhta 3 Ratu (2014) at Istana Budaya (National Theatre). She revived the character of Princess Hang Li Po. She played princess ‘LiLi Poh' in ZombieLaLaLa (2016) at Istana Budaya.

In late 2016, as a national representative, she toured with the multiracial casts from National Academy of Art, Culture & Heritage (ASWARA) to ASEAN Theatre Week (China) and Festival Tokyo; and successfully performed for an international audience.

== Filmography ==
=== Film ===
Year	Title	Role	Director	Notes
2014	The Cage 2014	Fanny	Felix Tan and Ketshvin Chee	Malaysia Film
2019	Two Sisters	Mei Yue	James Lee	Malaysia Film
2020	Not My Mother's Baking	Joyce	Remi M Sali	Singapore Film
2020	Hail, Driver!	Bella	Muzzamer Rahman	Malaysia Film
2021	25/Exit Stage...Left	Ivy	Lingeswaran Sanasee	Malaysia Film
2022	Halimun	Cindy	Muzammer Rahman	Malaysia Film
2024	Padu		Faisal Ishak	Malaysia Film

=== Drama series ===
Year	Title	Role	Broadcaster	Notes
2013	Back to Time FM 1970	Rainbow	NTV7	Main Cast
2015	Identity Switch		NTV7	Supporting Cast
2015	3cm Short		NTV7	Supporting Cast
2022	Ratu Ten Pin 2: Shalin	Christi	Astro Ria	Supporting Cast
2022	Kamcing	Jin Hao	Sooka	Main Cast

=== Theatre ===
Year	Title	Role	Director	Notes
2014	Takhta 3 Ratu	Princess Hang Li Po	Erma Fatima	Main Cast
2016	ZombieLaLaLa	Princess LiLi Poh	Aris Kadir	Main Cast
2018	Tanah Akhirku	Ying Feng	Naque Ariffin and Aloeng Silalahi	Main Cast & Producer
