= Cinta Ilahi =

2014 Malaysian television series

- Genre: Drama; Romance; Religion
- Directed by: Azman Yahya
- Starring: Johan As'ari; Diana Amir; Nazrief Nazri; Dian P. Ramlee; Ramona Zamzam
- Opening theme: Taubat - Nineball
- Ending theme: Taubat - Nineball
- Country of origin: Malaysia
- Original language: Malay
- No. of seasons: 1
- No. of episodes: 13

Production
- Executive producer: Azman Yahya
- Producer: Sheila Rusly
- Production locations: Kuala Lumpur, Malaysia
- Running time: 38-42 minutes
- Production company: JS Pictures Sdn Bhd

Original release
- Network: TV3
- Release: 19 December 2014 – 20 March 2015

Cinta Ilahi (English: Divine Love) is a 2014 Malaysian television series starring Johan As'ari, Diana Amir, Dian P. Ramlee, Nazrief Nazri and Ramona Zamzam. It aired on TV3 every Friday at 21.00 MST from December 19, 2014 to March 20, 2015. This drama streaming in YouTube TV3 Malaysia.

== Synopsis ==
Hud's a wild teenager, though he still hears her mother's words. He works as a slave boy but does not care about his work and likes to hang out. The situation changed when he met Mariam, a pure, beautiful girl. Because he wanted to capture Mariam's heart, he was willing to change by always coming to the mosque and attending religious lecture. Unfortunately, when Mariam was betrothed with Basri. What happens next?

== Cast ==
- Johan As'ari as Hud
- Diana Amir as Mariam
- Dian P. Ramlee as Mak Ani
- Ramona Zamzam as Zara
- Shakila Khoriri as Shakira
- Nazrief Nazri as Kojek
- Shamsul Ghau Ghau as Ustaz Hashim
- Mubarak Majid as Pak Samad
- Idzham Ismail as Zul
- Syafnida Shuhaimi as Misha
- Nas-T as Faizal
- Beego as Basri
- Raja Afiq as Hanif
- Ben Amir sebagai Amir
- Adam Lee as Johan
- Halim Radzi as Amar
