= Shanon Shah =

Malaysian singer-songwriter (born 1978)

- Born: 14 August 1978 (age 47)
- Origin: Alor Star, Kedah, Malaysia
- Genres: Soul
- Occupations: Singer-songwriter, journalist, playwright
- Instrument: Piano
- Years active: 2001–present
- Label: Interglobal Music

Shanon Shah (born 14 August 1978 in Alor Star, Kedah), is a singer-songwriter, playwright and academic from Malaysia. He released two albums Dilanda Cinta (2005) and Suara Yang Ku Dengar (2010) on the InterGlobal Music Malaysia independent label. He is noted for his emotive voice and cabaret-style piano playing.

Trained as a chemical engineer, Shanon has previously worked as a credit risk analyst, human rights advocate and journalist. In his various writings, he focuses on issues relating to gender, sexuality and Islam.

== Music ==
In 2003, Shanon won the Mandarin Oriental Fan of the Arts Most Promising Artist Award at the 2nd Annual Boh Cameronian Arts Awards. Two years later, he went on to win the Anugerah Industri Muzik award for best male vocal in an album for Dilanda Cinta.

In 2007, he entered the Ikon Malaysia televised competition which looked for an icon among existing Southeast Asian artistes. The Malaysian level of the competition was ultimately won by Jaclyn Victor.

Shanon has also performed as a duo with fellow singer-songwriter Azmyl Yunor and with his backing band the Cintas. Fellow singer-songwriter Ariff Akhir has also performed as part of the Cintas, and produced Shanon's second album, Suara Yang Ku Dengar.

Shanon's musical influences include Leonard Cohen, Aimee Mann and Sam Phillips.

== Theatre and film ==
Shanon Shah is also a playwright. His play Air Con was by the Instant Cafe Theatre Company's FIRSTWoRKS programme. The play, directed by Jo Kukathas and Zalfian Fuzi, was performed to critical acclaim prompting a revival in 2009.

One reviewer praised not only the play's take on issues such as hate crimes against transsexuals, homophobic bullying in schools, racism and religious fundamentalism, but also its comedic touches and bilingual dialogue. Shanon has said he is greatly influenced by award-winning Malaysian actor and playwright Jit Murad.

Air Con was nominated in nine categories for the 7th BOH Cameronian Arts Awards, winning four awards, including Best Original Script (Bahasa Malaysia).

Shanon also co-wrote the screenplay and four original songs for Chris Chong Chan Fui's first full-length feature film Karaoke, which in 2009 was selected for the Directors' Fortnight of the Cannes Film Festival. The songs for Karaoke eventually made it into Suara Yang Ku Dengar.

== Journalism and writing ==
Shanon Shah was also the former full-time Columns and Comments Editor at The Nut Graph, a bilingual, independent, Malaysian online news site aiming "to provide space for columnists and reader comments from as broad a political spectrum, and from as many sectors of interest, as possible". He contributed several English-language features, commentaries and interviews on the politics of Islam in Malaysia. His fortnightly Malay-language column, Secubit Garam, often took a light-hearted approach to serious political concerns through the fictional agony aunt Kak Nora.

Shanon has also been published in other print anthologies. His 5,000-word essay "The Khutbah Diaries" was published in New Malaysian Essays 2 in 2009. In the same year his essay, "Muslim 2 Muslim", was published in Body 2 Body, an English-language anthology of fiction and non-fiction on sexual diversity in Malaysia. Body 2 Body was published by writer-director Amir Muhammad's publishing company, Matahari Books.

In June 2012, Shanon's essay "Lot's Legacy" was published in the third issue of Critical Muslim (Fear and Loathing), a British "quarterly magazine of ideas and issues showcasing ground-breaking thinking on Islam and what it means to be a Muslim in a rapidly changing, interconnected world". The magazine is co-edited by London-based Muslim scholar and critic Ziauddin Sardar.

== Current activities ==
In 2010, Shanon was awarded the Chevening Scholarship to pursue his Master of Arts (MA) in Religion in Contemporary Society at King's College London. He completed his MA in 2011 and won the Shelford MA Prize from King's School of Arts and Humanities.

He is currently a doctoral candidate at King's College London.

== Discography ==
- Dilanda Cinta (2005)
- Suara Yang Ku Dengar (2010)

== Filmography ==
- Karaoke (2009)

== Theatre ==
- Air Con (2008)

== Awards ==
- First Prize – "Kisahmu Belum Berakhir" (song: music and lyrics) for Pertandingan Mencipta Lagu Patriotik Alaf Baru, by International College of Music Malaysia, 2001
- Mandarin Oriental Fan of the Arts Most Promising Artist Award, 2nd BOH Cameronian Arts Awards, 2003
- Best Male Vocal in an Album, for Dilanda Cinta, 13th Anugerah Industri Muzik, 2005
- Best Original Script (Bahasa Malaysia), for Air Con, 7th BOH Cameronian Arts Awards, 2008
