= Amerul Affendi =

Malaysian actor

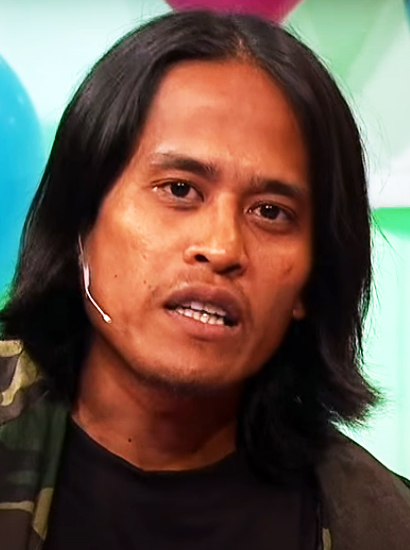
- Affendi in 2016
- Born: Mohd Amerul Affendi bin Mohd Mawardi; 7 October 1986 (age 40); Temerloh, Pahang, Malaysia
- Occupation: Actor
- Years active: 2008–present
- Spouse: Yusma Laili Iskandar Mirza (m. 2012)

Mohd Amerul Affendi bin Mohd Mawardi (born 7 October 1986) is a Malaysian actor. He is best known for his acting roles in television and film. For his role as Toyu in the film Terbaik dari Langit (2014), he won the Best Supporting Actor award at the 27th Malaysian Film Festival in 2015.

== Other activities ==
Outside of his acting career, Amerul Affendi is also involved in the agricultural industry which has been in business since 2016 to secure his future. According to him: "For the past three years I have been active in agriculture such as palm oil cultivation and livestock including buffalo and catfish. I am working on this project in my hometown of Temerloh, Pahang. If in the past the acting world was a major source of income, now it is no longer because my focus is on agriculture".

== Filmography ==
=== Film ===
Year	Title	Role	Notes
2009	Karaoke		Debut film appearances
2011	Sini Ada Hantu	Man	
2011	Tolong Awek Aku Pontianak	Noordin	
2011	Jalan Pintas		
2012	Bunohan	Muski	
2013	Bikers Kental	Al Buqerk	
2013	PSIKO: Pencuri Hati	Man	
2014	Terbaik dari Langit	Toyu	Special appearance
2015	Polis Evo	Mat Yam	
2016	Pekak	Azman	
2016	Dukun Doktor Dani	Lepat	
2017	Mencari Rahmat	Azman	
2018	One Two Jaga	Adi	
2018	Langsuir	Keding	
2018	Paskal	Rudy	
2018	Operasi X	Mat Bong	
2019	Bikers Kental 2	Al Buqerk	
2019	Rise to Power: KLGU	Belut	
2020	Pasal Kau!	Parjo	
2020	Bikin Filem		
2020	Prebet Sapu	Aman	
2021	Jangan Takut: Kau Takut Aku Pun Takut	Dol	
2021	Dendam Penunggu	Teacher Azidi	
2022	Kongsi Raya	Aziz	
2022	Hantu Mok Joh	Yem	
2022	Spilt Gravy on Rice	Faizal	
2022	Kalut Nak Kahwin	Mustaqim	
2022	Jerangkung Dalam Almari	Ramdan	
2022	Stone Turtle	Registry Officer	
2022	Tilam Perca	Akob	
2023	Sumpahan Jerunei	Tommy	
2024	Pendekar Awang: Darah Indera Gajah	Tobah	
2025	Limbungan: Tragedi Hitam 1975	Malik	
2025	6 Jilake	Sikuping	
2025	Laknat	Murtaza	
2025	Martabat: Misi Berdarah		
2025	Mencari Ramlee	Hang Jebat	Special appearance
2026	Libang Libu	Man Filem	

=== Television series ===
Year	Title	Role	TV channel	Notes
2008	Rona Roni Makaroni	Amerul	Astro Ria	
2009	Warkah Terakhir: Rosli Dhoby	Tajuddin	Astro Citra	
2015	Risiko		TV2	
2018	Matahari Cerah Lagi	Yem	TV1	
2018	KL Gangster: Underworld	Belut	Iflix	
2018	Destinasi Ukhuwah	Suhaimi	TV1	
2019	Babi!	Faz	HOOQ	
2020	KL Gangster: Underworld 2	Belut	WeTV	
2021	Lockdown	Wan	Astro Ria	
2021	Malaysian Ghost Stories	Zaini	Astro Ria	Episode: "Hantu Air"
2021	Jangan Ganggu Jodohku	The Incarnation of Ashes	Astro Ria	
2022	Lockdown 2	Kamarul	Astro Ria	
2022	One Cent Thief	Kadak	Astro Ria	
2025	BRU	Ajan	Tonton	

=== Telemovie ===
Year	Title	Role	TV channel
2014	5 Beradik		TV2
2015	Aku, Dia dan Tong Gas		TV9
2015	Melur vs Rajawali	Shake	TV1
2015	Setulus Cinta Aqilah	Amin	Astro Oasis
2016	Segi Tiga	Lan	Astro Ria
2017	Kekasih Elektrik	Saiful	Astro Citra
2017	Jula Juli Bintang Cinta	Idzham	Astro Citra
2017	Saling	Suffian	TV1
2017	Sebelum Ajal	Nizam	TV3
2017	Jula Juli Bintang Putus Cinta	Idzham	Astro Citra
2017	Gadis Kosmos		Astro Citra
2018	Hamba Iblis	Tahir	Astro Citra
2019	Aku Raja Lawak		Astro Citra
2020	Madu	Mail	TV Okey
2021	Hello Suria		Awesome TV
2021	Pang Pokok Ketapang!	Irfan/Pang	Awesome TV
2021	Rompak Raya	Amy	Awesome TV
2023	Durjana Pujaan		TV1

=== Theatre ===
Year	Title
2014	Asrama RA All-Stars

== Videography ==
=== Music video ===
Year	Title	Singer	Character	Director
2019	"Blank Marquee"	Yuna & G-Eazy	The Villain	Adam Sinclair

=== Short video ===
Year	Title
2010	Kaulah Yang Ku Mahu

== Awards and nominations ==
Year	Award	Category	Result	Ref.
2015	27th Malaysian Film Festival	Best Male Supporting Actor	Won	
2015	Kuala Lumpur Film Critics Council Award 2015	Best Male Supporting Actor	Won	
2019	30th Malaysian Film Festival	Best Male Supporting Actor	Nominated	
2019	2019 ASEAN International Film Awards and Festivals	Best Male Supporting Actor	Won	
