= Air Force The Movie: Selagi Bernyawa =

Air Force The Movie: Danger Close
- Malaysian theatrical release poster
- Directed by: Zulkarnain Azhar; Frank See
- Screenplay by: Zulkarnain Azhar; Peter Toyat; Opie Harris; Frank See
- Story by: Zulkarnain Azhar; Opie Harris; Ahmad Faizal; Azman J
- Based on: Operation Pyramid; Operation Fajr
- Produced by: Josiah Cheng; Keoh Chee Ang
- Starring: Aiman Hakim Ridza; Dato Adi Putra; Nas-T; Luqman Hafidz; Johan As'ari; Pablo Amirul; Jack Tan; Sara Ali
- Narrated by: Nas-T
- Cinematography: Tan Teck Zee
- Edited by: Moray Toon
- Production companies: Golden Screen Cinemas; FXHammer Films; Multimedia Entertainment; SixFun Media; Astro
- Distributed by: GSC Movies
- Release date: 25 August 2022
- Running time: 103 minutes
- Country: Malaysia
- Language: Malay
- Budget: MYR 12 million
- Box office: MYR 30 million

Air Force The Movie: Danger Close (Malay: Air Force The Movie: Selagi Bernyawa) is a 2022 Malaysian Malay-language military action film directed by Zulkarnain Azhar and Frank See starring Aiman Hakim Ridza, Dato Adi Putra, Nas-T, Luqman Hafidz, Johan As'ari, Pablo Amirul, Jack Tan and Sara Ali.

== Plot ==
The movie follows the story of a PASKAU team led by Captain Adib (Nas-T) and his mentor, Major Adnan (Dato Adi Putra), tasked with protecting humanitarians serving in the fictional war-torn island nation of Namburi. On their return home, their plane is unexpectedly shot down by local militants, with nine people on the plane surviving. In Malaysia, the local air force plans to rescue the survivors. Adib's brother-in-law, Zafran (Aiman Hakim Ridza), a grounded Sukhoi Su-30 pilot, fights for the opportunity to save them. The air force eventually saves the survivors.

== Cast ==
- Aiman Hakim Ridza as Major Zafran 'Mantis' Abd Rahman TUDM, pilot Sukhoi Su-30, brother Hana and brother-in-law Captain Adib 'Rock' PASKAU
- Nas-T as Captain Mohd Adib 'Rock' Hasyim TUDM, young officer PASKAU & brother in law Major Zafran
- Dato Adi Putra as Major Adnan Zaid 'Lejen' Rahmat TUDM as commander officer mission Namburi
- Luqman Hafidz as Leading Aircraft Azran 'Gaban' Ahmad TUDM, marksman team Major Adnan
- Johan As'ari as Corporal Fakrul Razi 'Paco' Zain TUDM, medic team Major Adnan who has post-traumatic stress disorder
- Pablo Amirul as Sergeant Barat 'Tuai' Aripin TUDM, tracker team Major Adnan
- Jack Tan as Sergeant Anthony Gabriel 'Hujan' Lin, radioman team Major Adnan
- Scha Alyahya as Captain Nur Liyana TUDM, co-pilot Airbus A400M Atlas
- Fezrul Khan as Major Syed Yazid TUDM, pilot Airbus A400M Atlas
- Sara Ali as Natrah Hamzah, journalist documentary Era TV
- Anas Ridzuan as Mohd Nor @ Matno, cameraman Natrah
- Iman Corrine as Dr. Susan Livistone, surgeon humanitarian mission in Namburi
- Azira Shafinaz as Hana, sister of Major Zafran & wife of Captain Mohd Adib
- Sangeeta Krishnasamy as Lieutenant Layla Saravana TUDM, assistant Brigadier General Dato Rahim
- Esma Daniel as Brigadier General Dato Rahim Mohamad TUDM, division commander & in charge of Operation Hornbill
- Hafizuddin Fazil as Lieutenant General Dato Norman, Chief of Air Force
- Aqasha as Lieutenant Colonel Ramli Hassan, commanding officer Sukhoi Squadron
- Niezam Zaidi as Lieutenant Saifullah 'Cypher', rival of Major Zafran
- Adam Shahz as Lieutenant Hisham, friend of Lieutenant Saifullah
- Saidi Sabri as Major Suhami 'Spoon', friend Major Zafran & assistant weapon Sukhoi
- Carmen Soo as Captain Marya Lee, engineering officer who charge case Major Zafran
- Seelan as Flight Sergeant Vibesh, crew A400M Airbus
- Idzham Ismail as Corporal Isma Ali Ismail, crew A400M Airbus (uncredited)
- Fauzi Nawawi as drill instructor cadets officer training (uncredited)

== Production ==
Air Force The Movie: Danger Close is produced in collaboration with the Royal Malaysian Air Force, Malaysian Armed Forces, and five major companies: Multimedia Entertainment, Golden Screen Cinemas (GSC), Astro, FXHammer Films, and SixFun Media.

It was directed by Zulkarnain Azhar, who had previously directed J Revolusi, and Frank See, who had written the script for PASKAL: The Movie. Azhar stated that production was "difficult with the Movement Control Order implemented". According to him, the actors underwent basic military training at PASKAU Jugra in Banting, Selangor, for a month.

=== Filming ===
Filming took place from October to December 2019. The flight and air combat scenes were filmed between January and February 2020 with the help of the Royal Malaysian Air Force (RMAF). The post-production process stopped, following the implementation of the Movement Control Order (MCO) in March 2020 due to the spread of the COVID-19 pandemic in Malaysia. Filming locations include Kuantan, Pahang, Kuala Terengganu, Terengganu, Shah Alam, Selangor, Alor Star, Kedah, Kota Belud, and Sabah.

== Soundtrack ==
The film's soundtrack, Selagi Bernyawa, was performed by The Penthemix and written and composed by Pown Hasril, Amir Masdi, and Nass. It was released on 1 August 2022.

== Release ==
The film was originally scheduled for release in August 2021, but was postponed for unknown reasons. It was announced that the film released in cinemas nationwide on August 25, 2022.

The premiere ceremony was held on August 22, 2022, at GSC Mid Valley with 2,000 guests attending, including RMAF and RMN officials, as well as the cast of the film.

Golden Screen Cinemas also planned to distribute the movie to Japan, South Korea, and Taiwan.

== Reception ==
Air Force The Movie: Selagi Bernyawa earned a total of RM6-8 million at the box office within 3–4 days of its official premiere. Currently, the movie has earned a total of RM13 million at the box office before distribution to Japan, South Korea, and Taiwan.
