= One Two Jaga =

2018 Malaysian film directed by Namron

Crossroads: One, Two, Jaga
- Directed by: Namron
- Written by: Nam Ron; Pitt Hanif; Muhammad Syafiq
- Story by: Nam Ron; Amri Rohayat (Note: Amri dies in March 2017 due to cancer 4th stage.); Ayam Fared
- Produced by: Rozi Izma Abdul Karim; Bront Palarae
- Starring: Zahiril Adzim; Rosdeen Suboh; Ario Bayu; Asmara Abigail; Amerul Affendi; Iedil Putra; Chew Kin Wah; Along Eyzendy; Namron; Azman Hassan; Izuan Fitri
- Cinematography: Helmi Yusof
- Edited by: Razaisyam Rashid
- Music by: Tony Merle; Bembi Gusti
- Production companies: Jazzy Pictures; KL POST; Pixel Play
- Distributed by: TGV Pictures; Primeworks Studios
- Release dates: 29 April 2018 (Far East Film Festival); 6 September 2018 (Malaysia)
- Running time: 125 minutes
- Country: Malaysia
- Languages: Malay; English; Indonesian
- Budget: US$350,000

One Two Jaga (also known internationally as Crossroads: One Two Jaga) is a 2018 Malaysian crime drama film directed by Nam Ron based on the screenplay by Nam Ron, Pitt Hanif and Muhammad Syafiq and story by Nam Ron, the late Amri Rohayat and Ayam Fared. It stars Zahiril Adzim, Rosdeen Suboh, Ario Bayu, Asmara Abigail, Amerul Affendi, Iedil Putra, Chew Kin Wah, Along Eyzendy, Namron, Azman Hassan and Izuan Fitri.

The film was released on 6 September 2018. The uncensored version of the film was released worldwide on Netflix on 1 December 2018 as an original film.

== Plot ==
The film portrays the lives of corrupt cops working for the Royal Malaysia Police who take bribes from small business owners and get caught in criminal activity.

== Cast ==
- Zahiril Adzim as Hussein
- Rosdeen Suboh as Hassan
- Ario Bayu as Sugiman
- Asmara Abigail as Sumiyati
- Amerul Affendi as Adi
- Iedil Putra as Marzuki
- Timothy Castillo as Rico
- Chew Kin Wah as James
- Along Eyzendy as Zul
- Namron as Dato'
- Azman Hassan as Pak Sarip
- Izuan Fitri as Joko
- Alif Aiman as Afiq
- Vanida Imran as Rozita
- Anne James as Headmistress
- Ho Yuhang as Restaurant Owner
- Sabri Yunus as Seller
- Farah Ahmad as Investigating Officer
- Bront Palarae as Investigating Officer
- Rahhim Omar as Police Station Chief
- Sahronizam Noor as Immigration Officer
- Han Zalini as Immigrant

== Production ==
One Two Jaga first appeared when the movie concept trailer was released on YouTube in 2014. The film was directed by Namron who previously directed Gedebe (2013) and Psiko: Pencuri Hati (2013). Ron wrote the script with Ayam Fared, Pitt Hanif, Amri Rohayat, and Muhammad Syafiq. Bront Palarae and his wife, Rozi Isma, served as producers for Pixel Play.

Namron chose to highlight bribery as the main subject of the film. The cast is made up of actors from Malaysia, Philippines and Indonesia, including Timothy Castillo, Amerul Affendi, Ario Bayu, and Asmara Abigail. Nam Ron also mentioned that this film is not "anti-cops" or "anti-police", instead he called it as "anti-graft" film. The film script was rejected twice by former inspector-general of police Khalid Abu Bakar before it got the green light to be filmed. Zahiril Adzim tells the media that the film didn't want to hurt police image, instead the film is all about action of police being greedy. Same statement pulls out from the director himself to the media.

== Reception ==
=== Show ===
One Two Jaga was initially planned to be screened at various foreign film festivals. However, the producer decided that the film should also be screened at Malaysian cinemas. The film was officially released on 6 September 2018.

The first screening of One Two Jaga was on opening night of the Far East Film Festival in Udine, Italy on 29 April 2018. On 29 June 2018, One Two Jaga represented Malaysia at the 17th New York Asian Film Festival in New York. One Two Jaga was a commercial failure and Namron later expressed his disappointment on Twitter about the reaction to the film.

=== Critical reviews ===
Shazryn Mohd Faizal from mStar Online described One Two Jaga as "a precious work of Nam Ron and his colleagues although One Two Jaga is certainly not able to record tens of millions of dollars but aesthetics, exclusives, and souls which is precious is what makes One Two Jaga worth honored and respected."

== Future ==
Namron reveals that he want to direct minister bribery in the future while Bront set to direct his directional debut by the genre of thriller.

== Novel adaptation ==
The film was adapted into a 283-page novel of the same name by Sahidzan Salleh. The novel was published by Buku FIXI and released in May 2018.

== Awards ==
One Two Jaga bagged 6awards including Best Film at the 30th Malaysia Film Festival (FFM30). The film also won two out of five nominations at the 2019 ASEAN International Film Festival And Awards (AIFFA).

Year	Award	Category	Recipient	Results
2019	ASEAN International Film Festival And Awards (AIFFA)	Best Director	Nam Ron	Won
2019	ASEAN International Film Festival And Awards (AIFFA)	Best Supporting Actor	Amerul Affendi	Won
2019	ASEAN International Film Festival And Awards (AIFFA)	Best Film	Pixel Play	Nominated
2019	ASEAN International Film Festival And Awards (AIFFA)	Best Screenplay	Nam Ron, Amri Rohayat & Ayam Fared	Nominated
2019	ASEAN International Film Festival And Awards (AIFFA)	Best Actor	Rosdeen Suboh	Nominated
2019	Anugerah MeleTOP Era (AME)	MeleTOP Film	One Two Jaga	Nominated
2019	Anugerah MeleTOP Era (AME)	MeleTOP Film Star	Zahiril Adzim	Nominated
2019	Festival Filem Malaysia 30th	Best Film	Bront Palarae, Rozi Izma Abdul Karim & Pixel Play Entertainment Sdn Bhd	Won
2019	Festival Filem Malaysia 30th	Best Director	Nam Ron	Won
2019	Festival Filem Malaysia 30th	Best Actor	Rosdeen Suboh	Won
2019	Festival Filem Malaysia 30th	Best Screenplay	Nam Ron, Amri Rohayat & Ayam Fared	Won
2019	Festival Filem Malaysia 30th	Best Original Story	Nam Ron, Muhamamd Syafiq & Pitt Hanif	Won
2019	Festival Filem Malaysia 30th	Best Poster	Pixel Play	Won
2019	Festival Filem Malaysia 30th	Best Editor	Razaisyam Rashid	Nominated
2019	Festival Filem Malaysia 30th	Best Supporting Actor	Amerul Affendi	Nominated
2019	Festival Filem Malaysia 30th	Best Child Actor	Izuan Fitri	Nominated
2018	17th New York Asian Film Festival	Best Film (Tiger Uncaged Award)	Bront Palarae, Rozi Izma Abdul Karim & Pixel Play Entertainment Sdn Bhd	Nominated
2018	Five Flavours Film Festival	Best Film (New Asian Cinema)	Nam Ron (director)	Nominated
