= Sembunyi: Amukan Azazil =

- Film poster
- Directed by: Kabir Bhatia
- Screenplay by: Alfie Palermo
- Story by: Kabir Bhatia, Rosihan Zain
- Produced by: Jalena Rejab
- Starring: Diana Danielle; Remy Ishak; Umie Aida; Sharnaaz Ahmad
- Cinematography: Nurhanisham Muhammad
- Edited by: Adilan Azemi; Kabir Bhatia
- Music by: Hafiz Hamidun
- Production companies: Grand Brilliance; Filmscape
- Distributed by: Primeworks Studios
- Release date: 28 March 2013 (Malaysia)
- Running time: 98 minutes
- Country: Malaysia
- Language: Malay

Sembunyi: Amukan Azazil (English:Hide: Azazil's Rage) is a 2013 Malaysian Malay-language period dark fantasy horror film written by Rosihan Zain and Kabir Bhatia as the directors of this film. This film starring Diana Danielle, Remy Ishak, Umie Aida and Sharnaaz Ahmad.

== Plot ==
Aishah is a Malay girl. During the Japanese Invasion of Malaya, she is knocked unconscious as she attempts to escape from invading Japanese soldiers. She wakes up in a strange silent town which seems to be unaffected by the invasion. The townsmen provide her with shelter, and she starts a new life. Soon she realises that there are other secrets being concealed by the town, such as a mysterious devil woods outside the town, and a demon called Azazil that preys on the villagers.

== Cast ==
- Diana Danielle as Aishah
- Remy Ishak as Kamal
- Umie Aida as Ibu Yani
- Sharnaaz Ahmad as Atan
- Fizo Omar as Ahmad
- Shukri Yahaya as Salleh
- Emelda Rosmila as Melur
- Sara Ali as Hanum
- Aznah Hamid as Hanum (Old)
- Kismah Johar as Ummi (Old)
- Razib Salimin as Azazil

=== Special appearance ===
- Sheila Rusly as Mysterious woman
