= Asmara Abigail =

Indonesian actress (born 1992)

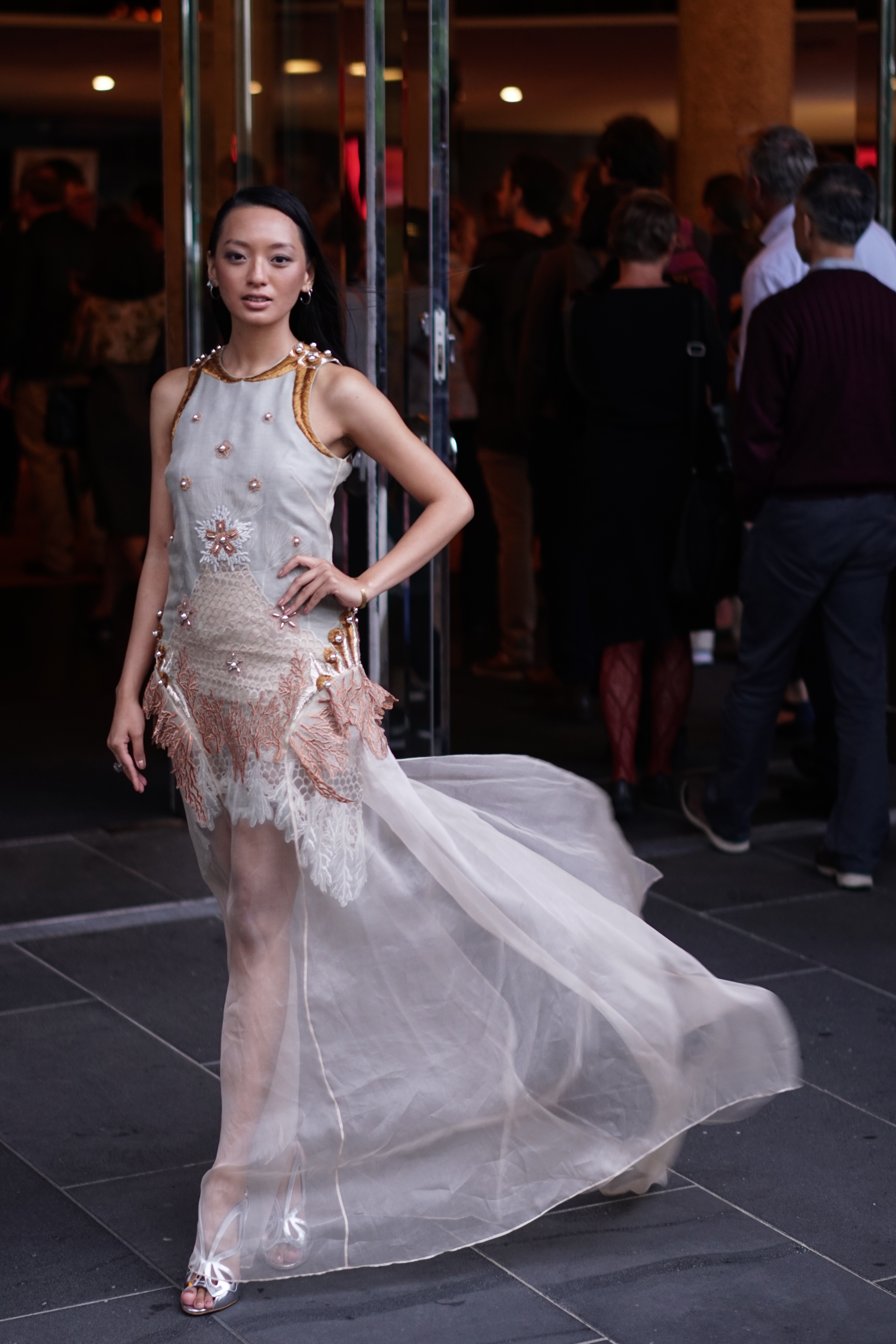
- Abigail in 2017
- Born: Asmara Abigail Sumiskum; 3 April 1992 (age 34); Jakarta, Indonesia
- Occupations: Actress; dancer; model
- Years active: 2012—present

Asmara Abigail (born 3 April 1992) is an Indonesian actress, dancer, and model who rose to prominence after starring on Joko Anwar's horror films Satan's Slaves (2017) and Impetigore (2019). She was nominated for three Citra Awards for her performances in Homecoming (2019), Yuni (2021), and Till Death Do Us Part (2024).

== Career ==
Abigail started her career by competing on Go Girl! and Nylon teen modelling competitions. She made her acting debut by starring in a short film The Wheel in 2015 as Rana, a sex worker who is exploited by her pimp. In 2016, she starred in Garin Nugroho's silent film Satan Jawa in her feature acting debut. Nugroho stated that he cast Abigail on the film for her background in tango, flamenco, and pole dancing. In the same year, Abigail starred in two Joko Anwar's horror short films Jenny and Don't Blink!. The collaboration led her to star in Anwar's Satan's Slaves as Darminah.

In 2018, Abigail starred in Malaysian action crime film One Two Jaga. In 2019, Abigail starred in two other Anwar's films, Gundala and Impetigore. She was picked by Variety as one of the year's Asian Stars: Up Next, along with Im Yoon-ah, Ryota Katayose, Bhumi Pednekar, Bea Alonzo, Praewa Suthampong, Jennis Oprasert, and Liên Bỉnh Phát. Abigail received her first Citra Award nomination for Best Supporting Actress for her work on Homecoming at the 2020 Indonesian Film Festival. A year later, she was nominated for the same category for her work on Kamila Andini's Yuni. She returned to star in the sequel Satan's Slaves 2: Communion in 2022. She starred in Malaysian-Indonesian co-production Stone Turtle, which premiered at the 75th Locarno Film Festival.

In 2023, She was selected to participate in Berlinale Talents.

In 2025, Abigail was appointed as a member of the jury at the 78th Locarno Film Festival for Concorso Cineasti del Presente – Filmmakers of the Present Competition.

== Filmography ==
Film

Year	Title	Role	Notes
2015	The Wheel	Rana	Short film
2016	Jenny	Jenny	Short film
2016	Don't Blink!	Woman	Short film
2016	Satan Jawa	Asih	
2017	Satan's Slaves	Darminah	Cameo
2017	Melodi	Helper / Deity	Short film
2018	Sultan Agung Mataram 1628	Roro Untari	
2018	One Two Jaga	Sumiyati	
2019	Cult	Lia	
2019	Ghost Writer	Bening	
2019	#MoveOnAja	Nadia	
2019	Gundala	Desti Nikita	
2019	Impetigore	Ratih	
2019	Homecoming	Santi	
2019	Abracadabra	Laila	
2019	The Science of Fictions	Nadiyah	
2019	A Plastic Cup of Tea Before Her	Yanti	Short film
2020	Mangkujiwo	Kanti	
2020	Il Vespista		Short film
2021	A World Without	Tara	
2021	Yuni	Suci Cute	
2022	Satan's Slaves 2: Communion	Darminah	Cameo
2022	Stone Turtle	Zahara	
2022	Galang	Asmara	
2024	Till Death Do Us Part	Asmara	
2024	#OOTD Outfit of the Designer	Luni	
2024	Kotak	Alam	Short film

Television

Year	Title	Role	Network	Notes
2017	Switch	Alexa	Viu	Recurring
2021	Jarak & Waktu	Arina Anindia	Mola	Main cast
2022	Dapur Napi	Ayu	Vidio	Main cast
2022	Indonesia's Next Top Model	Herself	NET.	Episode: "Which Girl Gets Lost in the Woods?"
2024	Joko Anwar's Nightmares and Daydreams	Valdya Anjani	Netflix	Episode: "P.O. BOX"

Theatre

Year	Production	Role	Location
2020	Anugerah Terindah	Tie	Exclusive Mola programming
