= Johan As'ari =

Malaysian actor

- Born: Johan Ariff bin As'ari; 3 December 1986 (age 39); Bukit Mertajam, Penang, Malaysia
- Occupation: Actor
- Years active: 2010–present
- Known for: Juvana

Johan Ariff bin As'ari (born 3 December 1986) is a Malaysian actor. He gained attention after starring in Juvana and appeared as a contestant on season 1 of Fear Factor Selebriti Malaysia.

== Early life ==
Johan was born in Bukit Mertajam, Penang. He is the son of Datuk As’ari Ibrahim, Political Secretary to former Malaysia's Minister of Works Dato' Shaziman Abu Mansor. His sister, Farah Alya was also an actress from 2007 to 2009.

== Career ==
Johan's first role was in television series Penunggu Gunung Raya.

In 2016, Johan appeared in the drama Mr Tanda Soal as the lead role.

== Filmography ==
=== Film ===
Year	Title	Role	Notes
2013	Juvana	Botak	Debut film appearances
2013	Balada Pencinta	Amir	
2013	Paku	Fahmi	
2013	Kolumpo	Gangster 1	Special appearance
2013	Tokan	Rano	
2014	Dollah Superstar	Himself	Cameo appearance
2014	Ophilia	Beggar	Cameo appearance
2015	Juvana 2: Terperangkap Dalam Kebebasan	Botak	
2016	Juvana 3: Perhitungan Terakhir	Botak	
2016	Bo-Peng	Peng	
2017	Kanang anak Langkau: The Iban Warrior	Lans Korperal Wan Shaipuddin Abu Kassim	
2018	7ujuh	Sam	
2019	Tiada Tajuk	Ustaz Adam	Cameo appearance
2019	Banglo 99	Tengku Putra Shah	
2021	Penunggang Agama	Hafiz	
2021	Penunggang Agama 2	Hafiz	
2022	Hantu Kuat Ketawa	Newsreader	Cameo appearance
2022	Mat Kilau	Yassin	
2022	Air Force The Movie: Selagi Bernyawa	Corporal Fakhrul Razi ‘Paco’ Zain TUDM	
2023	VII XII	Bentayan	
2024	Memoir Seorang Guru	Alias (adult)	
2024	Abnormal: Buas		

=== TV Show ===
Year	Program	Role	TV channel	Notes
2013	Fear Factor Selebriti Malaysia	Himself	Astro Ria	partner with Kaka Azraff

=== Television series ===
Year	Title	Role	TV channel	Notes
2010	Penunggu Gunung Raya	Atif Mutaqin/Ustaz Taqin	TV3	
2011	Juvana	Botak	TV3	
2011	Kias Ramadhan	Megat	TV3	
2011	Cinta Elysa	Aril	TV3	
2011	Terowong	Adi	TV3	Episode: "Kain Kapan"
2012	Pelangi Kasih	Omar	TV3	
2012	Bunga-Bunga Syurga	Aiman	TV3	
2012	Tanah Kubur (Season 3)	Man	Astro Oasis	Episode: "Taubat Penzalim Anak Yatim"
2013	Udin Glamor Balik Kampung	Udin	TV2	
2013	Syahadat Cinta	Iqbal	TV Alhijrah	
2013	Karlos	Irwan Zaid/Karlos	TV3	
2013	Tanah Kubur (Season 7)	Ahmad	Astro Oasis	Episode: "Mati Jihad"
2013	Surat Dari Langit Biru	Zarul	TV3	
2013	Istidraj Cinta	Azhar	TV3	
2014	Kifarah 2	Shah	TV3	Episode: "Durian Oh Durian"
2014	Cinta Ilahi	Hud	TV3	
2015	Waris Kasih	Zamani	TV3	
2015	Kampung Semarah Padi	Kassim	TV1	
2016	Kifarah Mistik	Ben	TV3	Episode: "Haruman Setanggi"
2016	Cinta Teruna Kimchi	Amin	TV3	
2016	Udin Glamor Balik Kampung 2	Udin	TV2	
2016	Mr Tanda Soal	Amran	TV3	
2016	Cinta Tangkap Muat	Amzar	HyppTV	
2016	Terbaik Kias Ramadan	Megat	TV3	
2017	Jejak Karmila	Karim	TV3	
2017	Jurnal Suraya	Alif	TV3	
2018	Tok Adi	Asyraf	Astro Oasis	
2020	Sabili: Ali		Nuflix	
2021	P.A Lelaki Kerek	Tengku Irfan Haiqal	TV Okey	
2021	Lelaki Itu Untukku 2	Izman	TV1	
2021	Malaysian Ghost Stories	Azlan	Astro Ria	Episode: “Penunggu Pohon Beringin”
2021	Malaysian Ghost Stories	Haikal	Astro Ria	Episode: “Misteri Karak Highway"
2021	Keluarga Untuk Disewa	Zack	TV9	
2022	Reen Putus Cinta		Awesome TV	
2022	Tok Guru	Anuar	TV2	
2023	Special Force: Anarchy	Izzat	Disney+ Hotstar	
2023	Jaga Aku Selamanya	Shukri	TV3	
2025	Pasca Kau Pergi	Zulkifli	TV3	

=== TV Films ===
Year	Title	Role	TV channel
2011	Janjiku Pada Alwalid	Afiq	TV3
2011	Kesuma Jiwa		TV1
2011	Insaf		TV1
2011	Tasbih Putih	Salim	Astro Prima
2011	Jalan Songsang	Hud	TV3
2011	Romeo & Makcik Juliet		TV9
2011	Ajaibnya Cinta	Effendi	TV3
2012	Kau Untukku	Jefri	Astro Box Office
2012	Tersalah Cinta	Duwen	TV3
2012	Kampung Mangkuk Sengkuang	Awie	TV3
2013	Keroncong Untuk Ana	Amirul	Astro Prima
2013	Karlos Bolos	Irwan Zaid/Karlos	TV3
2013	Satu Hari Di Hari Raya	Syafiq	TV3
2014	Hitam	Daud	TV3
2014	Selempang Kuning	Salleh	Astro Prima
2014	Superstra	Amin	TV9
2014	Hatiku Di Krabi		TV9
2015	7 Petola Cinta	Habibol	TV9
2015	Lima Kali Cinta	Zarif	TV3
2015	Ketupat Lemang		TV9
2015	Lafaznya Amin	Shafie	TV1
2015	Cinta Riyadus Solihin	Talib	TV Alhijrah
2015	Wan Embong	Ali	TV3
2016	Anak Ibu Buangan Ibu	Shah	TV3
2016	Hujan Malam Itu	Lokman	TV1
2016	Aisha & Projek Dapur Ramadan	Yusof	TV9
2016	Aku Bukan Rasul	Haziq	TV2
2017	Sinar Cinta	Syukri	TV9
2017	Imam Samar-Samar	Azmi	TV9
2017	Obses	Iskandar	HyppTV
2018	Muara	Qasim	TV Okey
2018	3 Qul	Faiz	TV2
2020	Line Puaka	Idham	Astro Citra
2021	Maulidur Rasul Datang Lagi		TV3
2021	Lagenda Puteri Bulan		Astro Ceria
2022	Permintaan Terakhir Abah		Awesome TV

=== Television ===
Year	Title	TV channel
2013	Fear Factor Selebriti Malaysia	Astro Ria
2013	Betul Ke Bohong? (Season 4)	Astro Warna
2015	Ketuk-Ketuk Ramadhan	TV1
2015	Hidayah	TV1
2016	MeleTOP	Astro Ria
2017	Nasi Lemak Kopi O	TV9
2018	The Sherry Show And Friends	TV3
2018	It's Alif	NTV7
2018	MeleTOP	Astro Ria
2019	Aroma Tradisi	TV3
2023	Mic ON! Selebriti	Awesome TV

=== Music video ===
Year	Title	Singer
2013	"Al-Haq Yang Satu"	Mawi feat. AC Mizal
2017	"Pejamkan Mata"	Malique feat. Dayang Nurfaizah
2021	"Kau Yang Bertakhta"	Sarah Suhairi
2025	"Our Land, Our Home"	Aina Abdul

=== Drama radio ===
Year	Title	Station radio
2018	Drama Nur Hikmah: Mega Di Utuk Timur	IKIM.fm
