= Hail, Driver! =

2020 Malaysian drama film

- Poster
- Malay: Prebet Sapu
- Directed by: Muzzamer Rahman
- Starring: Amerul Affendi; Lim Mei Fen; Bront Palarae; Sharifah Amani
- Release dates: 27 November 2020 (Indonesia); 16 December 2021 (Malaysia)
- Running time: 82 minutes
- Country: Malaysia
- Language: Malay

Hail, Driver!, or known as Prebet Sapu (Malay) is a 2020 Malaysian Malay-language drama film directed by Muzzamer Rahman. The film tells the story of an illegal e-hailing driver named Aman who is colour blind, his experiences of driving passengers in the nights of Kuala Lumpur, and a friendship with his customer, Bella, a mysterious escort.

It is the Malaysian entry for the Best International Feature Film at the 94th Academy Awards, but was not shortlisted. The film is released on 16 December 2021 at cinemas in Malaysia. The film is shot in black-and-white.

== Premise ==
2018. Aman drives an old car inherited from his late father from Pahang to capital Kuala Lumpur to follow his dreams of becoming a writer. Struggles to find a job and being homeless, he uses his room on wheels to work illegally as a e-hailing driver, as he does not have a proper driving license since he is colour blind. One night, he meets another urban-poor soul, Bella, an escort girl, who offers him a place to stay. In return, he must become her private driver for her night jobs.

== Cast ==
- Amerul Affendi as Aman
- Lim Mei Fen as Bella
- Bront Palarae as Toompang Broker
- Sharifah Amani as Female Passenger 1
- Nadiya Nisaa as Female Passenger 2
- Jay Iswazir as Food Market Guy
- Nam Ron as Blind Passenger
- Chew Kin Wah as Indonesian Passenger
- Anas Ridzuan as Poster Boy
- Roslan Madun as Politician
- Megat Sharizal as Young Politician

== Release ==
Principal photography was completed in 2017. The film premiered on 27 November 2020 at Jogja-Netpac Asian Film Festival (JAFF) in Indonesia. It was also screened at the Udine Far East Film Festival in Italy, the Jogja-Netpac Asian Film Festival in Indonesia, the Toronto Reel Asian Film Festival in Canada, and the Asian Film Festival Barcelona in Spain.

In November 2021, it was announced that the film had been selected by the National Film Development Corporation (FINAS) as the Malaysian submission for Best International Feature Film at the 94th Academy Awards.

The film was released in cinemas nationwide on 16 December 2021, in Malaysia.

== See also ==
- List of submissions to the 94th Academy Awards for Best International Feature Film
- List of Malaysian submissions for the Academy Award for Best International Feature Film
