= Emily Lim =

Chinese actress

- 林佩琦
- Born: 5 August 1982 (age 43); Malacca, Malaysia
- Occupations: Actress; Model; Host; Nutritionist
- Years active: 2006–present
- Partner: Alan Yun (husband)
- Awards: Anugerah Majlis Pengkritik Filem Kuala Limpur; Best Leading Actress; 2019 Two Sisters

Emily Lim

Chinese name
- Traditional Chinese: 林佩琦
- Simplified Chinese: 林佩琦
- Hanyu Pinyin: Lín Pèiqí
- Jyutping: Lam4 Pui3 Kei4
- Hokkien POJ: Lîm Pōe-kî
- Tâi-lô: Lîm Puē-kî

Emily Lim (林佩琦; born 5 August 1982) is a Malaysian actress, model, host and nutritionist. In 2005, she participated in the Miss ASTRO International Chinese Pageant contest in Malaysia and made her debut as 1st runner-up, Miss Perfect Body and Miss Elegant. In 2006, she participated in local TV series "The Beginning", which was her first TV series. In 2019, she won the Best Leading Actress in the Kuala Lumpur Film Critics Association of Malaysia (Anugerah Majlis Pengkritik Filem Kuala Limpur) for her local horror film "Two Sisters".

== Early life ==
Born in 1982 into a Peranakan family, Emily was raised in Malacca, and lived with her family close to the Portuguese Settlement. Her childhood was less than idyllic however, as her father constantly imperilled their family. Unsurprisingly enough, her father ran away with the family's money, and never returned. It led to a terrifying experience that involved incensed thugs barging into Emily's household and attempting to abduct her. She was only sixteen years old at the time. In order to reduce the family's burden, Emily actively sought scholarships and worked everywhere to repay her father's debts. Later, she is attracted by the prize money of the beauty contest and resolutely signed up to participate. Finally, as she wished, Emily won the first runner-up of the Malaysia Miss ASTRO Chinese International Pageant and paid off part of the debts. Her time in the entertainment industry seemed to be brief at first, and she entered the corporate world after graduating. Emily's beauty and attractive performance in the pageant caught the attention of the audience and commercial advertisers, and TV drama producers began to invite her to participate in their projects. After discussion and encouragement by her boss of the engineering company, Emily decided to quit her full-time high paid salary job. In 2006, she decided to join the advertising model industry and the showbiz circle.

== Personal life ==
In 2010, Emily began a romantic relationship with actor Alan Yun, she married him on 28 February 2018.

== Filmography ==
=== Television series ===
Year	Title	Role	Broadcaster	Notes
2006	The Beginning		ntv7	Minor Role
2006	Falling in Love		ntv7	Minor Role
2007	The Beautiful Scent	Shi Yun	ntv7	Supporting Role
2008	Addicted to Love		ntv7	Supporting Role
2008	My Destiny		ntv7	Supporting Role
2009	My Kampong Days		ntv7	Leading Role
2009	Timeless Season		ntv7	Supporting Role
2010	Glittering Days		ntv7	Supporting Role
2010	Injustice	He Jingchun	ntv7	Leading Role
2011	The Seeds of Life		ntv7	Supporting Role
2011	Model a La Mode	Ivy	8tv	Leading Role
2012	Justice in the City	He Le-Er	ntv7	Leading Role
2013	The Enchanted	Liang Qian Qian	Mediacorp Channel 8 & Astro Shuang Xing	Supporting Role
2014	Outbound Love		TVB HK	Cameo Role
2014	Entangled		Mediacorp Channel 8	supporting Role
2014	In Laws II	Lin Bao Er	ntv7	Leading Role
2014	On the Brink	Xia Wei	ntv7	Leading Role
2015	3cm Short	Chen Shu Fen	ntv7	Cameo Role
2015	The Precedents	Chen Min Er	ntv7	Leading Role
2015	Turning Point	Wang Xiao Fan	ntv7	Leading Role
2015	Persona	Liu Yu En/Liu Yu Tong	8tv	Column Lead Role
2016	Beyond Words	Gu Hua	Mediacorp Channel 8	Supporting Role
2016	On the Brink	Xue Li	ntv7	Special Appearance
2016	Secret Lover	Lou Shi Lan	ntv7	Leading Role
2017	Legal Eagles	Amy	Mediacorp Channel 8	Supporting Role
2018	All Under One Roof	Tao Mei Mei	8tv	Supporting Role
2018	My Sensei Nyonya	Xie Li Sa	8tv	Leading Role
2019	Turning Point 2	Fang Ann Ying	8tv	Leading Role
2020	I Court You	Jian Man Ru	8tv	Leading Role

=== Film ===
Year	Title	Role	Director	Notes
2008	The Legacy of a Lost Love		Lai	Malaysia Film
2013	Kick Ass Girls	Red Dragon Emily	Vincci Cheuk Wan Chi	Hong Kong Film
2014	Second Life of Thieves	Miss Tan	Woo Min Jin	Malaysia Film
2016	KL Wangan	Olivia	Pekin Ibrahim	Malaysia Film
2019	Two Sisters	Mei Xi	James Lee	Malaysia Film

=== Short film ===
- 2013: Floating Sun - 3 Doors Of Horrors
- 2014: The Woman Upstairs
- 2016:SHE
- 2016: Breaking Point

=== Host ===
- We Love Kuala Lumpur
- NTV7 Good Morning Tai Tai Breakfast Show
- The 2nd Asia Success Award Gala Dinner
- Mrs. Malaysia International Year 2012
- Start Society “I Believe” 2011 Charity Concert
- Cellnique Annual Dinner Shanghai Banquet
- Euro Asia Chinese Golf Association Auction Gala night
- Euro Asia Chinese Golf Association Invitational Friendship & Charity Golf Competition Award night
- I-choice Online Fashion Magazine Launch
- Mother's Day Event Super Mummy Competition
- Poh Kong Jewellery Showcase
- Glenmarie Cove Property Launch
- Mah Sing Group Annual Dinner
- Malaysia Corrugated Carton Manufacturers’ Association Annual Dinner
- Federation of Goldsmiths and Jewelers Association of Malaysia Appreciation Night
- World Vision Nutrition Talk “Malnutrition in Metropolitan City” in Year 2016
- Pensonic Longevity Detox recipes book
- Nutrition Talk about “Weight Lost and Diabetes” in Pudu First Assembly of God Church
- Develop Health food menu S2 Slimming Center

=== Advertisement Works ===
- Horlicks、Johnson & Johnson (Thailand)、Oral-B (China)、Mountain Dew (China)、Tourism Malaysia (Korea)、Caltrate (Hong Kong)、Sony (Asia)
- Bausch & Lomb、Kao Laurier、LG、DBS (Singapore)、Panadol (Taiwan)、Angel EZ110 Motorbike (Vietnam)、AOWA Electrical Gas Stove (Philippines)
- Maybank、Nestle Drumstick、ENO (Singapore)、Dubai Tower (Dubai)、Dettol (hong Kong)、Anmum Milk Powder

=== Commercial Short Film ===
- Petronas CNY 2019
- Petronas Kaamatan
- Petronas The Perfect Wedding

== Awards/Achievement ==
=== Drama ===
Year	Event	Title	Name	Character	outcome
2019	30th Malaysia Film Festival (FFM)	Best Actress in Leading Role	《Two Sisters》	Mei Xi	Nominated
2019	Anugerah Majlis Pengkritik Filem Kuala Lumpur	Best Actress in Leading role	《The Undercover》	Mei Xi	Won

=== Beauty Pageant ===
Year	Event	Title	Outcome
2005	Miss ASTRO International Chinese Pageant	First Runner Up	Won
2005	Miss ASTRO International Chinese Pageant	Miss Perfect Body	Won
2005	Miss ASTRO International Chinese Pageant	Miss Elegant	Won

=== Sport ===
Year	Event	Title	Outcome
2005	Initial-D Drifting Queen Contest	Second Runner Up	Won
