= Pekak =

2016 film by Mohd Khairul Azri Md Noor

- Directed by: Mohd Khairul Azri Md Noor
- Written by: Khairul Azri; Azril Hamzah; Alfie Palemo
- Produced by: Tengku Iesta Tengku Alaudin
- Starring: Zahiril Adzim; Sharifah Amani; Iedil Putra; Sharifah Sakinah; Amerul Affendi; Zaidi Omar; Joe Flizzow
- Cinematography: Sham Mokhtar
- Edited by: Khaidzir Aljunid
- Music by: MonoloQue
- Production companies: Grand Brilliance; Lightbulb Pictures
- Distributed by: Primeworks Studio
- Release dates: 30 June 2015 (World Premieres Film Festival); 1 September 2016 (Malaysia)
- Running time: 96 Minutes
- Country: Malaysia
- Language: Malay

Pekak (English: Deaf) is a 2015 Malaysian Malay-language drama thriller film directed by Mohd Khairul Azri Mohd Noor and starring Zahiril Adzim, Sharifah Amani, Iedil Putra and Joe Flizzow. The film tells the story of Uda, a deaf drug dealer who lives a life of crime so he can afford his Cochlear implants. His life, however, changes when he meets Dara, a rebellious schoolgirl who yearns to be free from her father's watching eyes. This sparks a relationship always on the brink in a world riddled with violence, sex and drugs.

The film was sold at the Marché du Film on 17 May 2016. It was later released to Malaysian cinemas nationwide on 1 September of the same year. It was however banned in Brunei due to scenes that the country's censors claim could "give bad influence" on the audience.

== Plot ==
Uda (Zahiril Adzim) is a deaf young man. He works under pusher (Joe Flizzow) as a drug dealer. He wants to hear again by collecting money from his drug sales for use to pay for the surgery. He lives in a room in a flats of distressed couple. Deck as he wants to hear again, every evening, he goes to the edge of the train to enjoy the wind and the tremors of the train. Before going to bed, he will listen to the song Rintihan Hati by Othman Hamzah. Dara (Sharifah Amani) is a teenage girl who lived with her troubled father, befriended Melur (Sharifah Sakinah). Dara's father (Zaidi Omar), a security guard, often worked at night, causing Dara to be less interested than his father. Dara and Melur are often skipping school because Melur wants to entertain with her boyfriend, Azman (Amerul Affendi), a street artist and drug addict.

One day, when Dara went to school together with Melur, they shared a lift with Uda, who then sent a drug to Azman. Uda saw Dara listening to his favourite song, Rintihan Hati. Uda started to fall in love with Dara. However, Dara has her own boyfriend, Kamil (Iedil Putra), a relative of Azman who is graduating from abroad and came from a rich family. Kamil always tries to bed Dara but does not succeed. This led Kamil to seek help from Azman and Melati. Kamil advocates a party to facilitate his mission to sleep with Dara. Melati and Dara deceive Dara's father that they will recite when Dara's father came out to work. On the contrary, they left the house accompanied by Azman to the Kamil party.

Uda sent a drug to Kamil's house at the request of Azman. While there, Dara's clothes got torn because it was too tight. Kamil gave the drug-filled water to Dara and Melati. Dara, who is not familiar with drug influences, associates with Uda who is excited to be able to meet again with Dara. Kamil tried to take advantage of Dara, but Dara puked on Kamil's shirt. Dara ran out of the house and Uda offered her a ride home. Dara accepted the invitation and they returned to Dara's house. Dara began to recognise Uda's name and tried to request Dara's phone number.

Dara's father hit Uda's head causing him to faint. Dara's father scolded Dara for cheating herself. Dara's father is worried that Dara will follow her mother's footsteps. Melati and Dara went to school again. Decks of being tired of melancholy finesse with Azman, Dara went to watch a movie with Uda. After watching the movie, Uda received a drug delivery request from Azman. Azman was discussing with Kamil about Azman's birthday party to continue his mission of sulling Dara's which had failed before. Dara knows about Uda's real job selling drugs and scolding Uda. Uda asked for another three days to get enough money for the surgery. After three days, Uda managed to raise enough money and make the surgery.

The birthday party of Azman's birthday was done in Kamil's house. Uda, as usual, sent a drug to Kamil's house at Azman's request. The drug was used by Kamil to feverish Dara. Dara faints and he was taken to Kamil's room by Azman. Azman, under the influence of drugs, began to fantasize Dara. He assaulted and raped Dara. Kamil cancelled the welcome party and dumped Dara in front of the emergency and trauma section of a hospital. Dara's father was disappointed with what happened to Dara and accused Uda of causing the injury. Dara's condition worsen and she is on death's door.

The angry Uda went to Kamil's house to find Dara rapists. Kamil asks him to forget what has happened. He also revealed that Azman had raped Dara. Depressed for failing to tarnish Dara, Kamil began to smoke drugs as well. Uda went to Azman's house. When he tried to quarrel with Azman, Melur entered Azman's house and scolded him for hurting Dara. Melur hit Azman by using his artwork that killed Azman. Uda went to the edge of the train route, ignoring the doctor's instructions to avoid noisy places. The scene cuts to Dara as she began to wake up from her coma.

== Cast ==
- Zahiril Adzim as Uda
- Sharifah Amani as Dara
- Iedil Putra as Kamil
- Sharifah Sakinah as Melur
- Amerul Affendi as Azman Picasso
- Joe Flizzow as the drug pusher
- Zaidi Omar as Dara's father
- Chew Kin Wah as Doctor
