= Karaoke (2009 film) =

- Film poster
- Directed by: Chris Chong Chan Fui
- Written by: Chris Chong Chan Fui; Shanon Shah
- Produced by: Chris Chong Chan Fui; Pierre Laburthe
- Starring: Zahiril Adzim; Mislina Mustaffa; Nadiya Nissa; Amerul Affendi
- Cinematography: Jarin Pengpanitch
- Edited by: Lee Chatametikool
- Music by: Shanon Shah
- Production company: Tanjung Aru Pictures
- Release date: May 21, 2009 (Cannes)
- Running time: 74 minutes
- Country: Malaysia
- Language: Malay

Karaoke is a 2009 Malaysian drama film directed by Chris Chong Chan Fui. Chong's first feature film following a number of short films, the film stars Zahiril Adzim as Betik, a young man returning home to reconnect with his family after several years living in Kuala Lumpur; although his relationship with his mother Kak Ina (Mislina Mustaffa) is strained, he takes a job in her karaoke bar and begins to pursue a romantic relationship with Anisah (Nadiya Nisaa).

The film premiered in the Directors' Fortnight stream at the 2009 Cannes Film Festival. It was later screened at the 2009 Calgary International Film Festival, where it won the Mavericks Award.

Lee Chatametikool won the Asian Film Award for Best Editing at the 4th Asian Film Awards for his work on the film.

== Cast ==
- Zahiril Adzim
- Mislina Mustaffa
- Nadiya Nissa
- Amerul Affendi
