= Stone Turtle =

- Directed by: Woo Ming Jin
- Written by: Woo Ming Jin; Deo Mahameru; Neesa Jamal
- Produced by: Woo Ming Jin; Edmund Yeo
- Starring: Asmara Abigail; Bront Palarae
- Cinematography: Kong Pahurak
- Edited by: Edmund Yeo
- Music by: Phil Chapavich
- Production companies: Greenlight Pictures; KawanKawan Media
- Distributed by: Parallax Films
- Release date: 4 August 2022 (Locarno Film Festival)
- Running time: 91 minutes
- Countries: Malaysia; Indonesia
- Language: Malay

Stone Turtle is a 2022 science fiction thriller film directed by Woo Ming Jin, starring Asmara Abigail and Bront Palarae.

== Plot ==
Island-dwelling refugee Zahara (Asmara Abigail) and an intrusive outsider (Bront Palarae) play out repeated versions of a cautious standoff: She deals in precious leatherback turtle eggs; he claims to be a wildlife researcher but pursues her with a passion that suggests other priorities.

== Cast ==
- Asmara Abigail as Zahara
- Bront Palarae as Samad
- Samara Kenzo as Nika
- Amerul Affendi as Registry Officer
- Maisyarah Mazlan as Zahara's sister
- Alison Khor

== Release ==
The film premiered at the 75th Locarno Film Festival on 4 August 2022. It was the first time a Malaysian film had been picked for the festival's main categories. The film won the FIPRESCI Prize at the festival.

Parallax Films acquired international sales rights to the film in August 2022.

== Reception ==
Matthew Joseph Jenner of the International Cinephile Society rated the film 4 stars out of 5, writing that "By the end of Stone Turtle it is likely that the viewer will leave the film with more questions than answers – in most cases, this would be a shortcoming, since the lack of closure can be frustrating. Yet Woo is gifted enough to use this as a powerful tool, one that stirs as much thought as it causes confusion, which matches the general tone of the film and creates a far more enriching experience than we may have expected at the outset."

Jessica Kiang of Sight & Sound wrote that "even without much in the way of subtext, the energy given off by the film’s bold engagement with its broad themes of violent patriarchal oppression, tradition colliding with modernity, and ancient folkloric traditions crossbreeding with newer storytelling forms keeps Stone Turtle compelling even when it fails to convince."
