= The Amber Sexalogy =

- Directed by: Azharr Rudin
- Release date: 2006
- Running time: 61 minutes
- Country: Malaysia
- Languages: Malay; English

The Amber Sexalogy is a 2006 Malaysian compilation of six short films by Azharr Rudin. It premiered at the 2006 Singapore International Film Festival. It was distributed in Malaysia on DVD.

== Content ==
Five out of the six shorts chronicle the various stages of a romantic affair between Amber (Melissa Maureen Rizal) and Harris/Man (who is played by three different actors: Gavin Yap, Mark Teh, Alvin Wong). The final short, Majidee, does not feature Amber but instead has Harris (Tora Andika) having a conversation with a man (Azman Hassan) while walking through Kuala Lumpur.

== Crew ==
- Azharr Rudin ... Writer/Director/Editor/Producer
- Yasmin Ahmad ... Executive Producer
- Rita Machdar ... Associate Producer
- Amir Muhammad (director) ... Associate Producer
- James Lee (Malaysian film director), Woo Ming Jin, Imri Nasution ... Camera
  Duration: 61 min

== Awards ==
- Best Short Film, Hawaii International Film Festival (2006)
- Incentive Award, Akira Kurosawa Memorial Short Film Competition (2007)
- Special Mention Prize, Singapore Short Film Festival (2008)

== Reception ==
CInemagazine found that the anthology "'scores a sufficient score when assessed as a whole, but the scores of the individual films vary widely. However, this collection is recommended for fans of Malaysian film and culture."
