= Mamak Puteh =

Malaysian actor and comedian (born 1984)

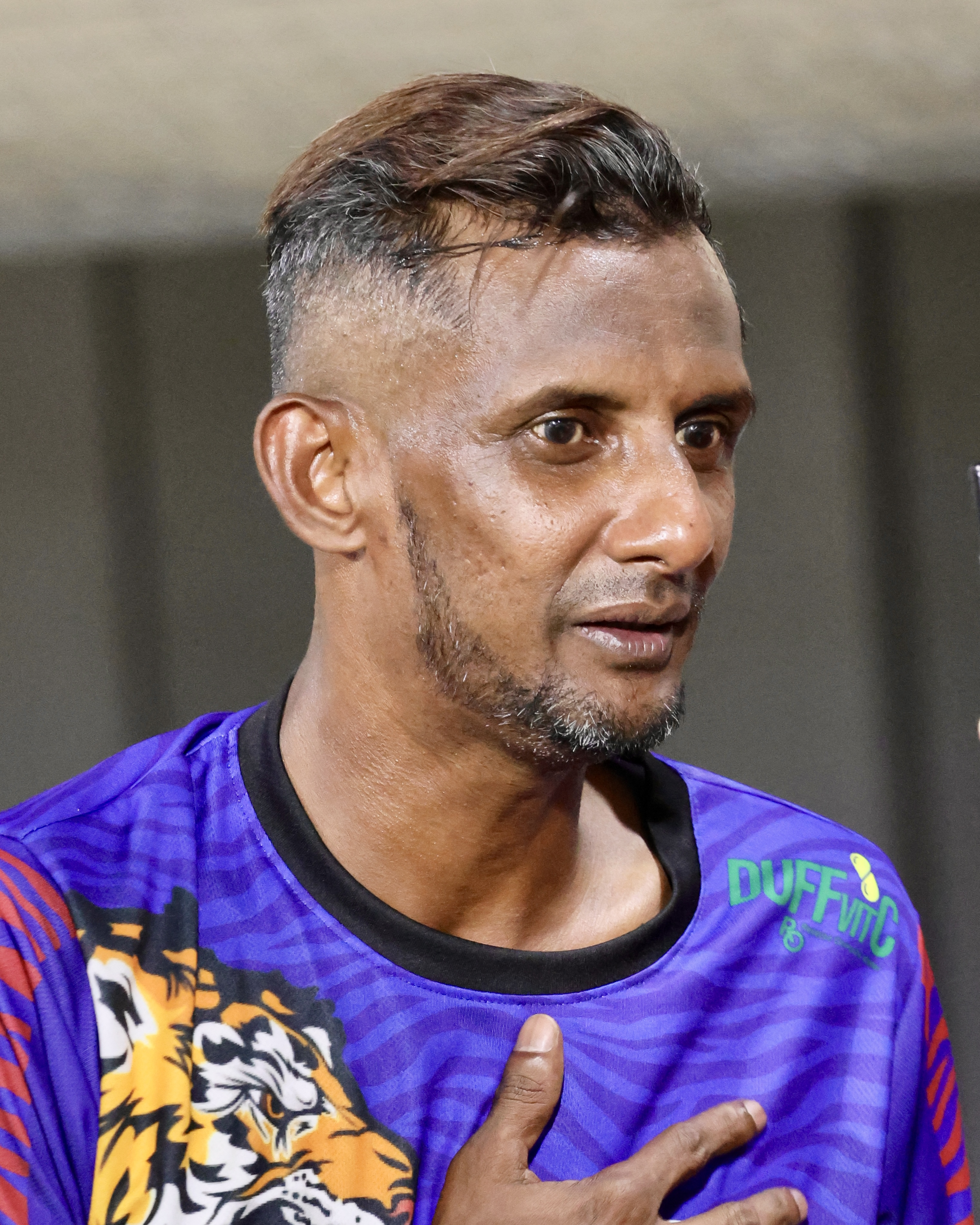
- Mamak in 2024
- Born: Mohamad Ikhtiarudin bin Naina Mohamad; 30 May 1984 (age 42); Penang, Malaysia
- Other name: Mamak Puteh
- Occupations: Actor; comedian
- Years active: 2012–present
- Spouse: Ellina Abdul Wahab (m. 2014)
- Children: 2

Mohamad Ikhtiarudin bin Naina Mohamad (born 30 May 1984), better known by his stage name Mamak Puteh, is a Malaysian actor and comedian of Indian descent.

== Career ==
=== Cooking career ===
Since he was young, Mamak had dreamed of being an expert in athletics, but he ultimately decided to follow his dreams in the food sector after seeing chances there. His proficiency in preparing conventional Indian cuisine is well-known. Due to his proficiency and knowledge in this area, he has significantly enhanced Malaysian cuisine. Subsequently, he was able to grow the company by establishing branches in a number of Malaysian cities. The Malaysian Food Association has given him the Malaysian Culinary Expertise Award three times in a row.

Mamak witnessed support from the people for his Teluk Bahang, Penang-based company, Round Island Café. The café opened its doors on 30 August 2020, and serves a variety of foods. As it was easier to deal with, he specifically invited Malaysian people to work in his first cafe. Later on, he acknowledges that he opened the food concept in an effort to support himself and his family by attempting different professions and raising his income.

=== Acting career ===
Mamak quickly became well known for his humorous speech patterns and captivating onstage persona. Additionally, he has been in a number of well-known dramas, comedies, and television programs. Along with Ali Puteh, who won the 2015 Color Comedy Project, he is a part of the Puteh ensemble. They participated in Maharaja Lawak Mega 2016 and made it to the finals, where they finished in third place.

The Puteh group tried their luck for four years to become champions and become part of Maharaja Lawak Mega. They welcomed a new participant during the Maharaja Lawak Mega 2019, the fourth year of the show, Man Raja Lawak, the winner of Raja Lawak season 5. They were eventually named champions for the first time because of their efforts. The second season of Ramadan Nostalgia with Datuk Chef Wan and special guests, including Mamak, will reair on 6 May 2020. Mamak, Vicha Saywho and Ali came out champions during the Maharaja Lawak Mega 2021.

== Personal life ==
Mamak wed Ellina Abdul Wahab in 2014, and the two of them have a daughter Iris Nur Adawiyah and a son Mohammed Ian Yusuff (born 8 August 2018). Siti Norhidayah Mohd Ali is his sister-in-law. In addition to his passion for cooking, he frequently paints Malaysian cultural treasures and scenic landscapes in his spare time. Despite his status, he was seen by the general public as having a positive attitude and not being instantly conceited or smug.

On 13 October 2018, in honor of National Sports Day, the nation's top radio station, Era Fm, arranged a friendly football game at the Bukit Jalil National Sports Complex. Mamak and vocalist Black Hanifah are two of the celebrities taking part.

== Filmography ==
=== Film ===
Year	Title	Role	Notes
2019	Kron	Pian	The first film
2019	Kolong	Putih	
2021	Mat Bond Malaya	Ejen 7	
2022	Kampung Latah The Mummy	Aaron	
2022	Remp-It 2	Ali	
2023	Mat Tudung Begin	Ali	
2024	Siapa Buka Lampu?	Awan	
2025	Sahak Gangster	Mikael	
2025	6 Jilake	Kelubis	

=== Drama ===
Year	Title	Role	TV channel	Notes
2020	One Two Hantu	Hangit	Awesome TV	
2021	One Two Hantu 2	Hangit	Awesome TV	
2021	Alif Ba Ta	Alif	Awesome TV	
2022	PolkaDot	Hans Koko	SukeTV	

=== Telefilm ===
Year	Title	Role	TV channel	Notes
2022	Mempelai Panda	Inspektor	Awesome TV	
2023	Baby Jarum		Astro Ria	

=== Television ===
Year	Title	Role	TV channel	Notes
2017	Travelawak	Lawyer	Astro Warna	
2020	Oops Terkena		Awesome TV	
2021	Riuh Family 2	Pick up	Awesome TV	
2022	Rumah Insaf		Awesome TV	
2023	Kampung Senariuh		Awesome TV	
