= Sharnaaz Ahmad =

Malaysian actor, host, director and producer (born 1985)

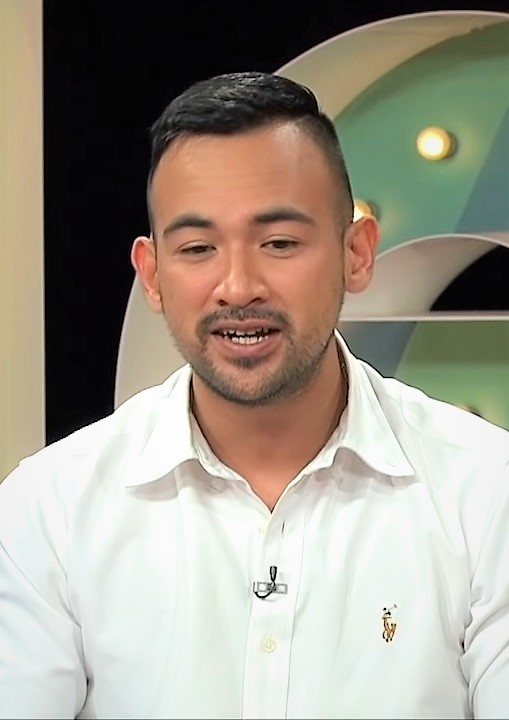
- Sharnaaz interviewed on MeleTOP in May 2015.
- Born: Sharnaaz Ahmad bin Basir Ahmad; 30 August 1985 (age 41); George Town, Penang, Malaysia
- Other name: Sharnaaz
- Occupations: Actor; Host Television; Director; Producer
- Years active: 2009–present
- Spouse: Noor Nabila Mohd Noor (m. 2017; div. 2020)
- Children: Jebat Jayden Ahmad
- Parents: Dato' Basir Ahmad Nazir Ahmad (father); Dato' Marina Puteh (mother)
- Website: sharnaazahmad.com

Sharnaaz Ahmad bin Basir Ahmad (born 30 August 1985) is a Malaysian actor, host, director and producer. He is a well-known character actor who always portrays anti-heroes and was nominated for several awards for his acting talent.

== Personal life ==
Sharnaaz is the son of Dato' Basir Ahmad Nazir Ahmad, a businessman in Penang. Basir was closely connected to the family of P. Ramlee. He participated in several bands during the 60s era of pop yeh yeh. Sharnaaz joined Prodigy Syndrome Management in 2010.

== Career ==
He debuted in 2009 with a small role in the drama series Tari Tirana, directed by Mohammed Shahrulezad. He appeared in the drama/comedy series K.I.T.A. directed by Michael Ang. He appeared in Dottie in 2010 and in the telefilm Ungunya Cinta.

He first played the lead in Seru, directed by Pierre Andre.

In early 2011, he appeared in the category Artists Popular New Male in Anugerah Bintang Popular Berita Harian 2010.

In 2013, he appeared in plays directed Michael Ang such as Kum Kum, Lagos Batu and Patah Seribu paired with Shila Amzah, his ex-girlfriend. He also appeared in dramas Ariana Mikhail, Bukan Bidadari.

He appeared in the film Juvana as a Lan Todak. In 2013, he played the husband in the telefilm Dibawah Langitmu with actress Nora Danish and competed in the category of Best Actor (Drama) Screen Awards . In the same event, he was nominated for Best Supporting Actor category (movies) through acting as Lan Swordfish in Juvana.

In 2014, he appeared in the 60 episode drama series titled Bukan Kerana Aku Tak Cinta .

== Filmography ==
| Year | Title | Role | Notes |
|---|---|---|---|
| 2011 | Seru | Jeff | Debut film appearance |
| 2013 | Juvana | Lan Todak | |
| 2013 | Sembunyi: Amukan Azazil | Atan | |
| 2014 | Dollah Superstar | Shah Dazzlee | |
| 2014 | Gila Baby | Roy | |
| 2015 | Darah Panas | Ady | |
| 2016 | Juvana 3: Perhitungan Terakhir | Lan Todak | Cameo appearance |
| 2017 | Sindiket | Inspector Rudy | |
| 2019 | Wangi | Khuzairi | |
| 2020 | Jebat | Jebat | |
| 2023 | Polis Evo 3 | Reza | |
| 2025 | Blood Brothers: Bara Naga | Ghaz | |
| 2025 | Magik Rompak | Hadi / "The Great Hadini" | |
| 2026 | The Original Gangster | Ryan | Post-production |
| TBA | Black Ops : Operasi Serigala | Johan | In production |
| TBA | Blood Brothers 2 : Perang Naga | Ghaz | Pre-production |

=== Television series ===
| Year | Title | Role | TV channel |
|---|---|---|---|
| 2009 | Tari Tirana | Ali | TV3 |
| 2010 | K.I.T.A | Azali | Astro Ria |
| 2010 | Dottie | Ameer | Astro Ria |
| 2011 | Kasih Alia | Qausar | TV3 |
| 2011 | Kum Kum The Series | Yusof | Astro Ria |
| 2012 | Ariana Mikhail | Ray | TV9 |
| 2012 | Memberku Hawa | Ghaz | TV3 |
| 2012 | Bicara Hati | Tengku Syahran | Astro Prima |
| 2012 | Bukan Bidadari | Arif | TV3 |
| 2013 | Ruby | Benjamin | TV3 |
| 2013 | Mira Sofia | Rayyan | Astro Prima |
| 2014 | Bukan Kerana Aku Tak Cinta | Jebat | Astro Mustika HD |
| 2014 | Setitis Kasih Darmia | Khairul Amir | TV9 |
| 2014 | Suamiku Encik Sotong | Farish | Astro Ria |
| 2014 | Danny The Series | Danny | Mediacorp Suria |
| 2014 | Mukhlis | Haikal | TV2 |
| 2015 | Babyana | Ray / Rahman | TV2 |
| 2015 | Mencintaimu | Hisham | TV3 |
| 2015 | Abang Sado Kau Ado | Sharnaaz | TV3 |
| 2015 | Ku Tinggalkan Cinta Di Okinawa | Raykal | Astro Mustika HD |
| 2016 | BOMBA Hero | Khalid | TV2 |
| 2016 | Mukhlis 2 | Haikal | TV2 |
| 2016 | Awak Sangat Nakal | Johan Rizqin | Astro Ria |
| 2017 | Mr. Hijab | Rem | TV3 |
| 2018 | Cinta Bukan Kristal | Adrian Hilman | TV3 |
| 2019 | Devoted | Iskandar | Viu |
| 2019 | Dia Yang Ku Cinta | Luqman | TV3 |
| 2019 | Lelakimu Yang Dulu | Hazrul Izzuddin | TV3 |
| 2020 | Pelindung Seorang Puteri | Hazril | Astro Ria |
| 2020 | Isteri Misteri | Rizal | TV3 |
| 2021 | Cinta Ramadan & Danny | Danny | Astro Prima |
| 2021 | I Promise Janji Anaqi | Anaqi | Astro Ria |
| 2023 | Budak Hostel Otaknya Sewel | Teacher Daniel | Astro Ria |

=== Television movie ===
| Year | Title | Role | TV channel | Notes |
|---|---|---|---|---|
| 2009 | Dalca Mami Georgetown | Radzi | Astro Prima | |
| 2010 | Pontianak Kampung Batu | Ramli / Vampire | Astro Ria | |
| 2010 | Kum Kum | Yusof | Astro Ria | |
| 2011 | Penanggal | Fazli | Astro Ria | |
| 2011 | Tangisan Langsuir | Halim | Astro Prima | |
| 2011 | Ungunya Cinta | Andi | Astro Ria | |
| 2011 | Mendongak Ke Langit | Hariz | Astro Ria | |
| 2012 | Rahsia Hati | Rayyan | TV9 | |
| 2012 | Warkah Cinta Mat Rock | Eddie | TV3 | |
| 2012 | Patah Seribu | Azu | Astro Ria | |
| 2012 | Di Bawah Langitmu | Osman | TV3 | |
| 2012 | Korban Kasih | Ihsan | TV Alhijrah | |
| 2014 | Bintang Hati | Farhan | TV2 | |
| 2014 | Perempuan Lindungan Kaabah | Fareez | Astro First Eksklusif | |
| 2015 | Ramadan Jangan Tinggal Kami | | TV3 | |
| 2015 | Hidupku, Solatku, Matiku | Nordin | Astro Oasis | |
| 2016 | Yang Terakhir Untukku | Jay | TV3 | |
| 2017 | Lukisan Cinta | Khairul | Astro Ria | Also as director and producer |
| 2017 | Gelap | Ghazlan | TV1 | |
| 2018 | Datangmu Ku Benci, Pergimu Ku Tangisi | Ezad | TV2 | |
| 2019 | Aku Bukan Bidadari | Hisyam | TV3 | |
| 2020 | Jam Tangan Paksu | Adam / Paksu | TV1 | |
| 2021 | Aku Bukan Malaikat | Hisham | TV1 | |
| 2021 | Syurga Tanpa Dosa | Aiman | TV2 | |
| 2022 | Raya Talak Satu | Jojo | Astro Ria | Also as producer |
| 2022 | Jangan Masuk Rumahku | — | Astro Ria | Also as producer |

== Television ==
| Year | Title | Role | TV channel | Notes |
|---|---|---|---|---|
| 2015 | Harta Dalam Stor (season 2) | Guest | Astro Ria | |
| 2016 | Gempak Superstar | Host | Astro Ria | with Scha Alyahya |
| 2016 | Maharaja Lawak Mega 2016 | Chief Lawak | Astro Warna | with Johan (Jonaz) |
| 2017 | Perang Jantina | Host | Astro Ria | with Siti Elizad |
| 2021 | Maharaja Lawak Mega 2021 | Mystery Jury (Sang Bara) | Astro Warna | Revealed identity in final week |
| 2022 | The Masked Singer Malaysia (season 2) | Guest Jury | Astro Warna | Replaced Remy Ishak |
| 2022 | Muzikal Lawak Superstar (season 3) | Host | Astro Warna | With Elly Mazlein |
| 2022 | Melodi | Guest host | TV3 | |
| 2022–2023 | The Masked Singer Malaysia (season 3) | Jury | Astro Warna | |

== Awards and nominations ==
| Year | Award | Category | Nominated work | Result |
|---|---|---|---|---|
| 2011 | Bintang Popular Berita Harian Awards | Most Popular Male New Artist | —N/a | Nominated |
| 2012 | 1st Blockbuster Awards | Best Leading Actor | Seru | Nominated |
| 2013 | 1st Melodi Awards | Sensastional Artist | —N/a | Nominated |
| 2013 | 17th Skrin Awards | Best Actor - Drama | Di Bawah Langitmu | Nominated |
| 2013 | 17th Skrin Awards | Best Supporting Actor – Film | Juvana | Nominated |
| 2013 | Kuala Lumpur Film Critics Circle Awards | Best Supporting Actor | Sembunyi: Amukan Azazil | Nominated |
| 2014 | 1st Kuala Lumpur Drama Festival Awards | Choice Actor Award | Ruby | Nominated |
| 2014 | 1st Kuala Lumpur Drama Festival Awards | Choice Cast Award | Ruby | Nominated |
| 2014 | 1st Kuala Lumpur Drama Festival Awards | Choice Couple Award (with Siti Saleha) | Ruby | Nominated |
| 2014 | Astro On the Go Fan Choice Awards | Favourite Fuyooo Actor | Bukan Kerana Aku Tak Cinta | Nominated |
| 2014 | 26th Malaysia Film Festival Awards | Best Supporting Actor | Juvana | Nominated |
| 2015 | 2nd MeleTOP Era Awards | Pelakon TV MeleTOP | —N/a | Nominated |
| 2015 | 3rd Kuala Lumpur Drama Festival Awards | Choice Actor Award | Setitis Kasih Darmia | Nominated |
| 2015 | 3rd Kuala Lumpur Drama Festival Awards | Choice Cast Award | Setitis Kasih Darmia | Nominated |
| 2015 | 3rd Kuala Lumpur Drama Festival Awards | Choice Couple Award (with Nelydia Senrose) | Setitis Kasih Darmia | Won |
| 2015 | 28th Bintang Popular Berita Harian Awards | Most Popular TV Actor | —N/a | Nominated |
| 2015 | 28th Bintang Popular Berita Harian Awards | Most Controversial Artist | —N/a | Won |
| 2015 | 28th Bintang Popular Berita Harian Awards | Best on Screen Chemistry (with Nelydia Senrose) | —N/a | Nominated |
| 2015 | 3rd Melodi Awards | Favourite Male Artist | —N/a | Nominated |
| 2015 | 3rd Melodi Awards | Sensational Artist | —N/a | Won |
| 2015 | 3rd Warna Comedian Awards | Best Comedy Actor – Film | Gila Baby | Nominated |
| 2015 | 3rd Warna Comedian Awards | Best Comedy Actor – Male | Suamiku Encik Sotong | Won |
| 2015 | Pesta Perdana 13 (Singapore) | Best Actor – Drama | Danny The Series | Won |
| 2015 | 19th Skrin Awards | Best Supporting Actor – Film | Gila Baby | Won |
| 2017 | 30th Bintang Popular Berita Harian Awards | Most Popular TV Actor | —N/a | Won |
| 2017 | 30th Bintang Popular Berita Harian Awards | Most Popular Film Actor | Darah Panas | Won |
| 2018 | 31st Bintang Popular Berita Harian Awards | Most Popular Film Actor | —N/a | Nominated |

== See also ==
- Carabat F.C.
