= Kron (film) =

2019 Malaysian Malay-language mystery drama film

- Directed by: Opie Zami
- Starring: Zahiril Adzim; Dayana Roza; Aman Graseka; Opie Zami
- Distributed by: Empire Film Solution
- Release dates: 22 August 2019 (Malaysia, Brunei)
- Running time: 90 minutes
- Country: Malaysia
- Language: Malay

Kron is a 2019 Malaysian Malay-language mystery drama film directed by Opie Zami. The film follows a history team expedition on tracing back the ancient King's path, a passage used by King of Siam during the 1800s, but things go wrong when the team are hunted by a creature named Kron.

It is released on 22 August 2019 in Malaysia and Brunei.

== Synopsis ==
Professor Daud, a historian at the Kedah Museum, is researching and keeping track of the King's Path, a route used by the King of Siam to transport the gold and silver flowers sent by Sultan Kedah back to Siam between 1803 and 1910. Professor Daud has four stages of cancer. Daud and his assistant Sham are banned by their superiors from carrying out the mission for safety concern. But they get the chance to do so when an entrepreneur Melur Seri and paranormal TV producer Pian offers to sponsor the trip. Daud's another objective of the trip is to find out why his wife disappeared on their previous trip.

What starts off as a smooth expedition takes a dark turn when they are lost in the jungle and are now being hunted by a mysterious creature called Kron.

== Cast ==
- Zahiril Adzim as Sham
- Dayana Roza as Melur Seri
- Aman Graseka as Professor Daud
- Opie Zami as Ketoi
- Mohamad Ikhtiarudin as Pian
- Bohari Ibrahim as Tok Batin
- Ruminah Sidek as Nenek Suri
- Ellie Suriati as Bonoh Iring
- Cat Farish as Dr. Hamid
- Ahmad Idham as Professor Amri
- Johara Ayob as Professor Mariana
- Syazwan Zulkifly as Arwan
