= Tiada Tajuk =

2019 Malaysian Malay-language comedy film

- Directed by: Mawi
- Produced by: Mawi; Ekin Rahmat
- Starring: Mawi; Hazama Azmi; Along Cham; Joey Daud; Johan As'ari; Achey Bocey
- Production company: Mawi World Entertainment
- Distributed by: Empire Film Solution
- Release dates: 4 April 2019 (Malaysia, Singapore, Brunei)
- Running time: 100 minutes
- Country: Malaysia
- Language: Malay

Tiada Tajuk (English: Untitled) is a 2019 Malaysian Malay-language religious comedy film directed by Mawi in his directorial debut. It tells the story of three young village men who are considered as losers but still chase the dream of becoming singers.

It is released on 4 April 2019 in Malaysia, Singapore and Brunei.

== Plot ==
In a continuation of the TV movie Rock Sangkut, three young men Abadi, Kus and Rumi of small village Kampung Laut Menyanyi dream of becoming famous rock musicians, but are only able to play small gigs in their village. Inspired by Lobo, their religious friend, the three decide to pray to God for success in their becoming famous singers. Immediately after praying, they are approached by Haji, a rich man in the village, who introduces them to a music producer, Ustaz Mutawasitah. Lobo advises the trio to trust in God, and they make a religious vow that they'll take Lobo for umrah if their careers are successful.

Ustaz Mutawasitah brings the trio to Kuala Lumpur to record music, but after two weeks Ustaz Mutawasitah has abandoned them, leaving them penniless and without most of their belongings. Without money to go home, the trio argue over their fate, but decide to stick together. One night, they sleep inside a mosque and are found the next morning by the mosque's Imam. Imam helps them, and asks one of them to perform the morning adhan. Abadi rises to the challenge, and his melodious call impresses everyone.

Imam suggests that the trio perform at a nasheed competition to win money so that they can return home. The trio trade their rock look for religious clothing, name their band "Halal Bros", and win first place in the competition. Imam takes them to Tasawwuf Records, where they are reunited with Ustaz Mutawasitah, who apologizes for his behaviour and returns their things. Halal Bros also encounter Suci, a highly successful and secretly egoistic nasheed singer. Suci is dismissive of the group, but is shocked when Halal Bros's first song is a hit and they become a phenomenon. The trio is pleased but overwhelmed by the response of fans to their music, and Kus and Rumi in particular are uncomfortable at pretending to be religious.

Suci repeatedly tries to sabotage Halal Bros, and when he has a bomoh send a spell to kill the trio, it has the accidental effect of revealing that Rumi has been using magic to improve his voice. Abadi is angered and shocked, and leaves the band. Since Halal Bros have a concert coming up, Ustaz Mutawasitah asks Suci to become their new lead singer. However, when Imam falls ill, his daughter Cahaya asks Abadi to return. He does, leading into Suci's dismissal a heartfelt reunion of the band, who embrace their new lives. Abadi, Kus and Rumi are successful and, as promised, go for umrah with their friend Lobo.

== Cast ==
- Mawi as Suci
- Hazama Azmi as Abadi
- Along Cham as Kuswadi
- Joey Daud as Jalaludin Rumi
- Johan As'ari as Ustaz Adam
- Achey Bocey as Wak Calit
- Amira Othman as Cahaya
- Ropie Cecupak as Pak Imam
- Mas Earil Mustafa as Bo
- Kamarool Haji Yusoff as Ustaz Mutawasitah
- Anas Tahir as Tohir
- Deen Maidin as Pak Mat Besi
