= Two Sisters (2019 film) =

2019 Malaysian psychological horror film

- Directed by: James Lee
- Produced by: James Lee
- Starring: Emily Lim; Lim Mei Fen
- Music by: Nick Davis
- Production company: Kuman Pictures
- Distributed by: mm2 Entertainment
- Release date: April 18, 2019 (Malaysia)
- Running time: 1 hour 27 minutes
- Country: Malaysia
- Language: Mandarin

Two Sisters (Chinese: 姐妹) is a 2019 Malaysian Mandarin-language psychological horror film by James Lee. The film follows two sisters who reunite after one of them is discharged from the asylum. As they move back to their abandoned haunted family house, a tragic family secret unfolds.

It was released on 18 April 2019 in Malaysia. The film's score, written by composer Nick Davis, won the award for Best Original Score at the 30th Malaysian Film Festival in 2019.

== Plot ==
Following younger sister Mei Yue's release from an asylum, she is released into the care of her older sister Mei Xue. Together they move back to their abandoned family house. When Mei Yue starts seeing unexplained things, she begins to question if she is losing her mind again. Is their house is actually haunted? At the same time, the two sisters harbor a dark and tragic family secret from the past, which soon begins to unfold after their return.

== Cast ==
- Emily Lim as Mei Xi, older sister
- Lim Mei Fen as Mei Yue, younger sister
- Joyce Harn
- Angelyna Khoo
- Kym Tan
- Venice Ng
- Adery Chin
- Chai Zi
- William Boo
- Paige Chan
- Julianne Tan
- Mike Chuah
- Tan Li Yang

== Production ==
The film production was reportedly relatively low, with RM300,000. It is the first film by Kuman Pictures, a film production house founded in 2018 which produces low-budget horror and thriller films.

== Reception ==
Asian Movie Pulse said the film "has some minor flaws but still manages enough to like that it’s entirely watchable and enjoyable."
