= Kolong (film) =

2019 Malaysian horror film

- Directed by: Zul Abu Kassim
- Written by: Ellyna Ahmad
- Starring: Wan Raja; Luthya Sury Widjaja; Annie Arifin
- Distributed by: Empire Film Solution
- Release date: 17 October 2019 (Malaysia)
- Running time: 82 minutes
- Country: Malaysia
- Language: Malay
- Box office: MYR 27000

Kolong (English: Under) is a 2019 Malaysian Malay-language horror film directed by Zul Abu Kassim. It was released on 17 October 2019 in Malaysia.

== Synopsis ==
Suri dreams of becoming an actress but her money, which she has borrowed from a "money lender", is stolen by a travel agency. Thugs are now hunting her down to force her to pay her debt. She plans to get her mother's grant to pay for it but she is stopped by her sister. In dire need of money, she decides to accept a high-paying job as a caretaker of a blind man, since she has experience taking care of her blind mother. She encourages herself to go to the man's bungalow, even though it is supposedly haunted by the spirit of his late wife.

== Cast ==
- Wan Raja as Hairi
- Luthya Sury Widjaja as Seri
- Annie Arifin as Hanna
- Joey Daud as Dr Umar
- Vannessa Angle as Citra
- Mamak Puteh as Putih
