= Homestay: Permainan Maut =

2019 Malaysian Malay-language horror film

- Directed by: Kay Shan
- Starring: Ruminah Sidek; Sofea Shaheera; Asward Naslim; Kay Shan; Siva Garuda; Rohayu
- Music by: Nick Davis
- Production company: SB Production
- Release date: April 18, 2019 (Malaysia)
- Running time: 100 minutes
- Country: Malaysia
- Language: Malay

Homestay: Permainan Maut (English: Homestay: Deadly Game) is a 2019 Malaysian Malay-language horror film directed by Kay Shan. It follows eight college students who stays in a homestay and plays a board game that will bring death to them. It was released on 18 April 2019 in Malaysia.

== Synopsis ==
Eight college students stays in a homestay in village for a short vacation. They are warned by the owner to stay away from the store room but they disobey and open it anyway. There, they find a game named "Spirit of the Coins" and decide to play it. In this game, they have to say the owner of this game, which is SOFEA. When SOFEA is said out load, here comes the spirit that will kill them one by one.

== Cast ==
- Ruminah Sidek
- Sofea Shaheera
- Asward Naslim
- Kay Shan
- Siva Garuda
- Rohayu
