= Wangi (film) =

2019 Malaysian Malay-language psychological horror film

- Directed by: Mohd Latiff Zami (Yeop Hitler)
- Produced by: Shuhada Mohd
- Starring: Erra Fazira; Sharnaaz Ahmad; Nabila Huda; Syazwan Zulkifli
- Cinematography: Zuhiri Mat Ali
- Edited by: Isazaly Isa
- Music by: KL Post
- Production company: Resilience Studio
- Distributed by: Empire Film Solution
- Release date: 5 September 2019
- Running time: 91 minutes
- Country: Malaysia
- Language: Malay

Wangi (English: Scented) is a 2019 Malaysian Malay-language psychological horror film directed by Mohd Latiff Zami (Yeop Hitler) starring Erra Fazira, Sharnaaz Ahmad, Nabila Huda and Syazwan Zulkifli. The film follows a woman (Erra Fazira) who returns home after childbirth, but soon suffers stress as unnatural things happen on her house and children, all after her friend Bella (Nabila Huda) who lives with her disappeared.

It was released on 5 September 2019 in Malaysia, Singapore and Brunei.

== Synopsis ==
Nor and her husband, Khuzairi lives in a bungalow with their two kids. After giving birth to second child, Nor returns home and her mother comes to take care of her. She notices that her maid, Bella has disappeared. Bella is like a younger sister to Nor and she lives with them. Her husband says that Bella has returned to Amsterdam to get married. Nor suspects and soon her children start to have unnatural behaviours. Their first child likes to talk to himself and sleeps at random place; her husband hides secret while an old women always warns Nor. Unaware to Nor, the vanished Bella might be lurking in the dark corners of the bungalow.

== Cast ==
- Erra Fazira as Nor
- Nabila Huda as Bella
- Sharnaaz Ahmad as Khuzairi
- Syazwan Zulkifly as Azlan
- Mia Nasir as Mia
- Nik Adam Mika as Khiri
- Ruminah Sidek as Bella grandmother
