= Bikers Kental 2 =

2019 Malaysian Malay-language road action comedy fim

- Directed by: Helmi Yusof
- Written by: Helmi Yusof; Nurul Salajudin
- Produced by: Kamal Akram Ibrahim; Calvin Cheong Seng Foong; Mohamad Reesah Abd Bhari
- Starring: Zizan Razak; Afdlin Shauki; Awie; Amerul Affendi; Hushairy Hussein; Julangtip Sukkasem
- Cinematography: Helmi Yusof
- Edited by: Akashdeep Singh
- Music by: Pacai
- Production companies: MRB Network Sdn Bhd; Califwork Studios Sdn Bhd
- Release dates: 14 March 2019 (Malaysia, Brunei); 21 March 2019 (Singapore)
- Running time: 94 minutes
- Country: Malaysia
- Languages: Malay; Thai; English
- Budget: MYR 2 million
- Box office: MYR 7.6 million

Bikers Kental 2 is a 2019 Malaysian Malay-language road action comedy film directed by Helmi Yusof starring Zizan Razak, Afdlin Shauki, Awie, Amerul Affendi, Hushairy Hussein and Julangtip Sukkasem. This film is a sequel to the 2013 film Bikers Kental, the film continues the gang's motorcycle road trip adventure in southern Thailand six years later, as they fight the enemies and win back love.

It is released on 14 March 2019 in Malaysia and Brunei, on 21 March 2019 in Singapore.

== Synopsis ==
Six years later after the events in first film, Bidin Al Zaifa now owns a small successful motorcycle shop. Along with his friends Eddy and Aidil, they again embark on a journey to southern Thailand as Bidin wants to propose to Cherry Porntit, a woman in Hatyai that he is madly in love with. Meanwhile, Cherry's brother who is a Muay Thai champion, and the gang's old-time enemy Albuqueque stand in the way.

== Cast ==
- Zizan Razak as Bidin Al-Zaifa
- Awie as Eddie Cuardo
- Afdlin Shauki as Aidid
- Amerul Affendi as Albuqueque
- Hushairy Hussein as Eddy
- Julangtip Sukkasem as Cherry Pontit
- Kaew Korravee as Saiya Sukhapon
- Pont Cranium as Ananda
- Bront Palarae as Ponthaliwat Supachai

== Production ==
Filming took place in Phuket and Hatyai of Thailand.
