= Juvana 2: Terperangkap Dalam Kebebasan =

2015 film

Juvana 2:Terperangkap Dalam Kebebasan
- Directed by: Faisal Ishak
- Produced by: Kabir Bhatia; Francis Foo; Dato Seri Wong Chun Wei; Mira Mustafa
- Starring: Johan As'ari; Zahiril Adzim; Adam Shahz; Pekin Ibrahim; Hasnul Rahmat
- Cinematography: Nurhanisham Muhammad
- Edited by: Andy Abd Manaf
- Release date: 29 October 2015
- Running time: 93 minutes
- Country: Malaysia
- Language: Malay

Juvana 2: Terperangkap Dalam Kebebasan (English: Juvenile 2: Trapped in Freedom) is a Malaysian Malay-language action crime film directed by Faisal Ishak. The film follows the life of three former students — Botak, Daim and Ayam; after released from their sentence and began a new life without world of crime. But all their effort drawn into nothingness after all their families involved on crimes and kidnapped by Tok Ki, forcing these young men to save their families. The film premiered on October 29, 2015.

== Plot ==
The film follows the life of three former students, Botak, Daim and Ayam who adapt to the outside world as soon as their sentence ends. The storyline began after they were released early after rescuing the civilians during the riot at Indera Sakti School triggered by Lan Todak, the gangster who had been hostile to them once the former Wira Bakti students were transferred to the school.

They then have been determined to change their lives and do not want to be involved with the world of crime. Botak began to live with his father, while Ayam also began his life by supporting the lives of his siblings. At the same time, Daim also intends to continue his studies at the University of Malaya in the field of lawsuit and start a new life with his girlfriend, Sara, who often stated spending time hanging out with his colleagues for avoiding Daim to reminiscent of his memorable memories during detention. However, their expectations for a better future are also not as easy as they would expect.

Botak's father was a drug addict, while Ayam brother became friends with gangster gang known as Geng Jebat. Then, the fate of these three friends worsens when their loved ones become victims of the tyrannical Tok Ki's unnoticed motives, forcing these young men to work hard to save them. Finally, only one person can help them. Their last path is that only one can afford to seek help for their freedom from the shackles of their past tale.

== Cast ==
- Johan As'ari as Botak
- Zahiril Adzim as Daim
- Adam Shahz as Ayam
- Pekin Ibrahim as To'ki
- Hasnul Rahmat as Warden Raja Khairul
- Shera Aiyob as Sara
- Farhanna Qismina as Midah
- Eyka Farhana as Nadia
- Hafreez Adam as Megat
- Nad Zainal as Nabila
- Roslee Sako as Malik, Botak's father
- Amirul Aiman as Lan
- Azwan Kombos as Dr Nazim
- Ruzzlan Abdullah Shah as Din
- Ayez Shaukat as Shah
- Riki Rikando as Gajah
- Khairul Mohamed as Komeng
- Muhammad Syafiq Ikmal as Gaban
- Helmi Hakim as Abe
- Zaidi Omar as Tok Jebat
- Puteri Chi Chi as Lydia
- Aisya Hasnaa as Yati
