= James Lee (film director) =

Malaysian film director

- Born: Lee Thim Heng; 13 December 1973 (age 52); Ipoh, Perak, Malaysia
- Occupation: Film director
- Years active: 2000–present
- Spouse: Sylvia Tan (m. 2001)

James Lee, is a Malaysian film director. He was born Lee Thim Heng (simplified Chinese: 李添兴; traditional Chinese: 李添興; Jyutping: Lei5 Tim1 Hing1; Pe̍h-ōe-jī: Lí Thiam-heng) on 13 December 1973 in the city of Ipoh in Perak. He is one of the pioneers of the Malaysian Digital Film movement. His film The Beautiful Washing Machine won the Best Asean Feature Award and FIPRESCI Prize at the Bangkok International Film Festival 2005. Besides directing, he had also produced the early films of other Malaysian filmmakers, namely, Amir Muhammad and Ho Yuhang, under his production house, Doghouse73 Pictures.

== Filmography ==
=== Director ===
==== Feature-length ====
Year	Title
2001	Snipers
2001	Ah Beng Returns
2002	Room to Let
2004	The Beautiful Washing Machine
2006	Before We Fall in Love Again
2007	Things We Do When We Fall in Love
	Waiting For Love
	Breathing In Mud
2008	Histeria
2011	Sini Ada Hantu
2011	Tolong Awek Aku Pontianak
2015	Sunti @ Facebook
2017	Kl24: Zombie
2019	Two Sisters
2022	Kill-Fist
2022	Rasuk
2025	Legasi: Bomba The Movie

==== Shorts ====
Year	Title
2000	Sunflowers
2002	Emu Kwan's Tragic Breakfast
2003	Teatime with John
2003	Good-bye
2004	Goodbye to Love
1999	Ah Yu's Story
2005	A Moment of Love
2005	Bernafas Dalam Lumpur
2005	Sometimes Love is Beautiful
2006	The Amber Sexalogy

=== Producer ===
==== Feature-length ====
Year	Title	Director
2003	The Big Durian	Amir Muhammad
2003	First Take, Final Cut	Ng Tian Hann
2004	Sanctuary	Ho Yuhang

==== Short films ====
Year	Title	Director
2005	South of South	Tan Chui Mui
2006	Company of Mushroom	Tan Chui Mui

=== Director of Photography ===
Year	Title	Director
2002	Gedebe	Namron
2004	117	Albert Hue
2004	Monday Morning Glory	Woo Ming Jin
2006	South of South	Tan Chui Mui
2005	Raining Amber	Azharr Rudin
2005	Majidee	Azharr Rudin
2005	Follow Me	Albert Hue
2005	Flower	Liew Seng Tat
2005	Secret Past	Sylvia Ong
2005	La Invitation	Charlotte Lim
2005	Company of Mushroom	Tan Chui Mui
2005	Self Portrait	Kok Kai Foong
2006	Love Conquers All	Tan Chui Mui
