= Mawi =

Malaysian singer, actor, director, screenwriter, producer and radio presenter

- اسماوي بن اني
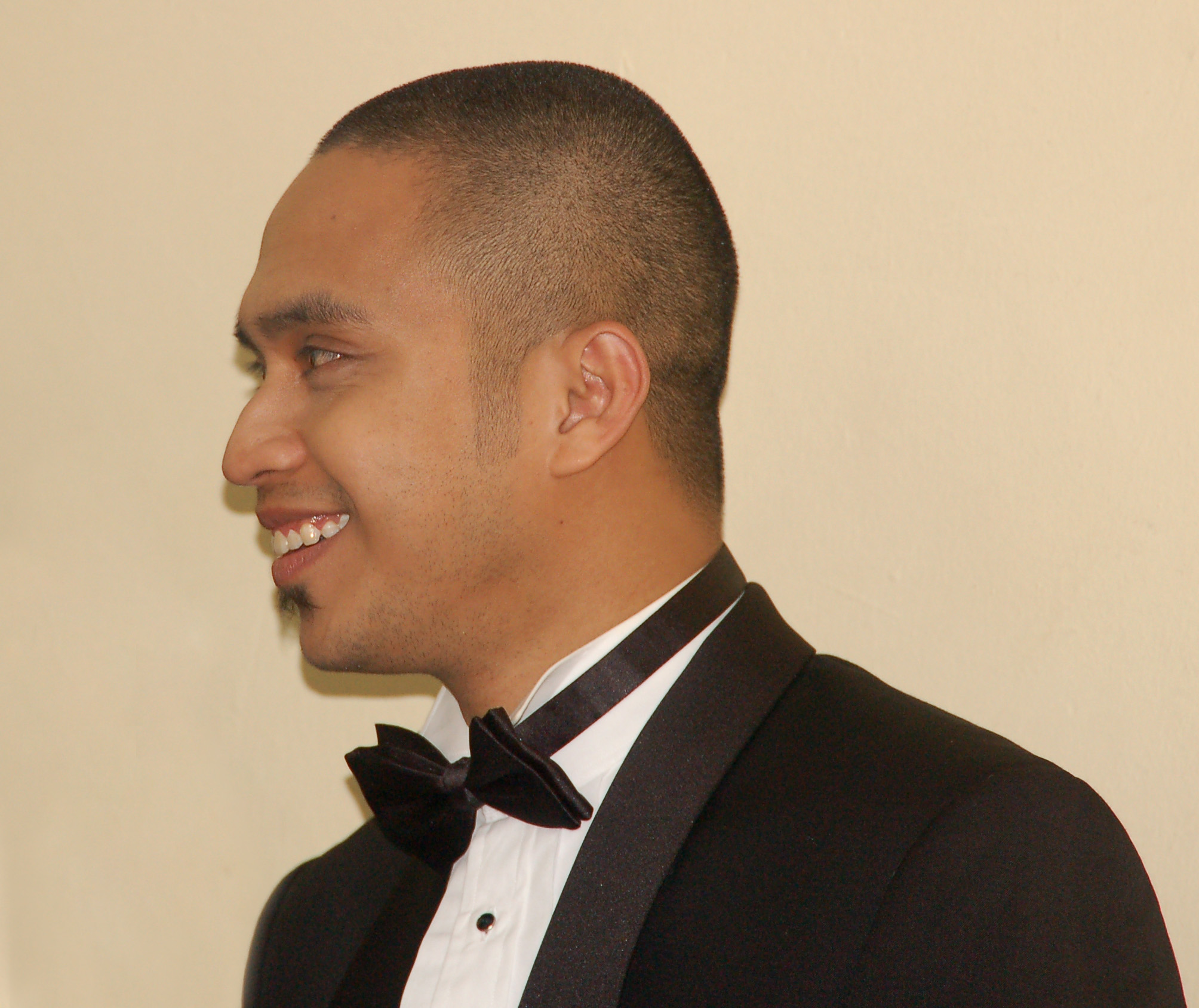
- Mawi in April 2007
- Born: Asmawi bin Ani; 25 August 1981 (age 45); Sultanah Aminah Hospital, Johor Bahru, Johor, Malaysia
- Occupations: Singer, actor, model, spokesperson, host, director, producer, radio presenter
- Years active: 2005—present
- Employer: Astro Radio (2017-24)
- Spouse: Ekin Rahmat (m. 2008)
- Children: 1
- Parents: Ani Ahmad (father); Ramlah Sarlan (mother)
- Musical career
- Genres: Pop, balada, nasyid
- Instrument: Vocal
- Labels: Maestro Records (2005–2008); Mawi World (2009–present)

Asmawi bin Ani, better known by his stage name Mawi is a Malaysian singer and winner of the Third Season of Malaysia's popular reality show, Akademi Fantasia. His father is a blacksmith in his hometown of Kulai.

Apart from singing, he is currently testing his skills in acting and performing magic acts. He is also a businessman.

== Discography ==
- Best Of Mawi World (August 2005) 165,000 copies sold (Platinum)
- Mawi... Yang Tercinta (November 2005) 126,000 copies sold (Platinum)
- Doa, Berzanji & Qasidah Berlagu (April 2006) 118,000 copies sold (Platinum)
- Mawi Yang Tercinta MTV Karaoke (2006) 55, 000 copies sold (Gold)
- Selingkar Kisah (Kehidupan Seharian Mawi di AF) (2006)
- Satu Dalam Seribu (2007)
- Allah Habeebi (2008)
- Al Haq... Yang Satu – Mawi ft. Dato AC Mizal (2013)
- Namamu Asma'mu – Mawi ft. Jeff A To Z (2013)
- Al Nuraa... Yang 5... Yang 6 – Mawi & Hazama ft. Daly Filsuf
- Kalah Dalam Menang – Mawi ft. Syamsul Yusof (2016)
- Bukan Propaganda – Mawi ft. Syamsul Yusof (2016)
- Menangislah – Mawi ft. Syamsul Yusof (2018)
- Qasidah Untuk Qamilah – Mawi ft. Shahir

== Filmography ==
=== Film ===
Year	Title	Credited as			Role	Notes
Year	Title	Actor	Director	Producer	Role	Notes
2009	Jin Notti	Yes	No	No	Aziz	Debut film appearances
2010	Magika	Yes	No	No	Bad	
2018	Munafik 2	Yes	No	No	Ustaz Azhar	
2019	Tiada Tajuk	Yes	Yes	Yes	Suci	Also screenwriter
2022	Hantu Kuat Ketawa	Yes	Yes	Yes		
2024	Pendekar Awang	Yes	No	No	Tok Kenali	
2024	Zim Zim Ala Kazim	Yes	Yes	Yes	Muharam	

=== Television series ===
Year	Title	Credited as			Role	TV channel	Notes
Year	Title	Actor	Director	Producer	Role	TV channel	Notes
2016	Gerak Khas (Season 16)	Yes	No	No	Himself	TV2	Episode: "Mawi Oh Mawi"
2020	Sabili: Ali	No	Yes	Yes		Nurflix	

=== Telemovie ===
Year	Title	Credited as			Role	TV channel	Notes
Year	Title	Actor	Director	Producer	Role	TV channel	Notes
2010	Pak Nil... Ibu Kirim Salam	No	Yes	Yes	—	Astro Prima	
2012	Siapa Dapat Lisa?	Yes	Yes	Yes	Sudirman	Astro Prima	
2014	Rock Sangkut	Yes	Yes	Yes	Suci	Astro Prima	Special appearance
2014	Novel Fana	No	Yes	Yes	—	Astro Prima	

=== Television ===
Year	Title	Role	TV channel
2009	Langkah Mawi World	Host	Astro Ria
2014	Ketuk-Ketuk Ramadan (Season 4)	Invited artist	TV1
2021	Keringat Selebriti	Invited artist	Awesome TV

== Radiography ==
=== Radio ===
Year	Title	Station
2 October 2017 – 31 December 2024	Zayan Salam Bros & Zayan Pagi & Zayan Salam Biz	Zayan

== Awards and nominations ==
2005

- Juara Akademi Fantasia Musim 3
- Anugerah Bintang Popular 2005 (Bintang Paling Popular)
- Anugerah Bintang Popular 2005 (Penyanyi Lelaki Popular)
- Anugerah Bintang Popular 2005 (Artis Baru Lelaki Popular)
- MTV Awards 2005 (Artis Paling Popular Malaysia)

2006

- Anugerah Bintang Popular 2006 (Bintang Paling Popular)
- Anugerah Bintang Popular 2006 (Penyanyi Lelaki Popular)
- Anugerah Bintang Popular 2006 (Artis Berkumpulan/Duo Popular (bersama Jamal Abdillah))
- Hits 1 (RTM1/Malaysia) Lagu Terbaik 2006 – "Lagu Jiwa Lagu Cinta"
- Anugerah Juara Lagu 2005 (TV3/Malaysia) Persembahan Terbaik – "Aduh Saliha"
- Anugerah Juara Lagu 2005 (TV3/Malaysia) Kategori Etnik Kreatif – "Aduh Saliha"
- Anugerah ERA 2006 (Penyanyi Lelaki Popular)
- Anugerah Era 2006 (Lagu Balada Popular – "Kian")
- Anugerah Era 2006 (Lagu Etnik Popular – "Aduh Saliha")
- Anugerah Era 2006 (Artis SMS Digi)
- Anugerah Era 2006 (Lagu Paling Popular 2005 – "Aduh Saliha")
- Anugerah Era 2006 (Video Klip Popular – "Lagu Jiwa Lagu Cinta" (arahan Mamat Khalid))
- Anugerah Planet Muzik 2006 (Lagu Paling Popular – "Aduh Saliha")

2007

- Anugerah Juara Lagu 2007 (Persembahan Terbaik – "Angan Dan Sedar")
- Anugerah Planet Muzik 2007 (Lagu Paling Popular – "Kian")
- Anugerah Planet Muzik 2007 (Artis Lelaki Paling Popular)
- Anugerah Bintang Popular 2007.(Bintang paling popular)
- Anugerah Bintang Popular 2007.(Penyanyi lelaki popular)
- MTV Award 2007.(Artis paling popular Malaysia)

Preceded by Ahmad Zahid Baharudidn	Akademi Fantasia winner Asmawi Ani (2005)	Succeeded by Mohammad Faizal Ramly
