= Cicak Man (film series) =

Cicak Man film series
- Directed by: Yusry Abdul Halim; Ghaz Abu Bakar (co-directed Cicak Man 3)
- Produced by: Norman Abdul Halim; Yusry Abdul Halim; Edry Abdul Halim; John Lucas
- Starring: Trio cast: (first two films); Saiful Apek; Fasha Sandha; Yusry Abdul Halim; AC Mizal; Secondary cast (Cicak Man 2); Tamara Bleszynski; Sharifah Amani; Trio cast: (Cicak Man 3); Zizan Razak; Lisa Surihani; Fizz Fairuz
- Music by: Edry Abd Halim
- Production companies: KRU (Cicak Man 1, 2, 3); Grand Brilliance Sdn Bhd (Malaysia and Brunei); Astro Shaw (Malaysia) (Cicak Man 3 only)
- Running time: 335 minutes (all three films)
- Country: Malaysia
- Language: Malay
- Budget: RM 8.2 Million (total, Cicak Man 1, 2, 3)
- Box office: $1,940,614.80 (worldwide, only Cicak Man)

The Cicak Man is a Malaysian film series consisting of three superhero films based on the fictional KRU Studios's Cicak Man comic book featuring the eponymous superhero alter ego of one Hairi Yatim.

KRU hired his trusted crew, Yusry Abdul Halim to direct all the films, and the series began with Cicak Man (2006) and Cicak Man 2: Planet Hitam (2008). For the third film, Cicak Man 3 (2015), the film were co-directed by Yusry and Ghaz Abu Bakar.

For the first two films, Hairi (Saiful Apek) develops a relationship with his lab partner crush, Tania Ashraf (Fasha Sandha). He battles the villains Professor Klon (Aznil Nawawi), Ginger 1/Ginger Ghost 1 (Adlin Aman Ramlie), Ginger 2/Ginger Ghost 2 (AC Mizal), and Rrama (Tamara Bleszynski). For the third film, Hairi has abandoned his responsibility as Cicak Man and has left Metrofulus. A new superhero has emerged during his absence, known as SuperBro (Yus Jambu). He has left a box containing all the requirements to become a Cicak Man inside the Cicak Man statue in Metrofulus which later is discovered by his successor, Man (Zizan Razak).

== Development ==
=== Cicak Man's CGI development ===
The film was shot using Dolby TrueHD, and about 40% of the film was shot in Green Screen. The visual effects team led by the director, Yusry, used CGI technology to fully realise the fictional city of Bandar Metrofulus (which was based on Kuala Lumpur), the protagonist's super-hero movements and various digital sets. Over 90% of the rotoscoping and compositing work were carried out by KRU Films (now known as KRU Studios), who were also behind the musical scores and audio effects.

=== Cicak Man 2: Planet Hitam production ===
The shooting that took place in Penang, Gua Tempurung, Kampar, Universiti Teknologi Petronas, and Kuala Lumpur costs 2.5 million Ringgit. The costume used in the sequel is higher in quality than the prequel as well as the price cost RM 50 thousand per set while in the prequel the costume used costs only RM 20 thousand per set.

=== Cicak Man 3 production ===
The shooting took place in Kuala Lumpur and Johor. The production cost were 4 million Ringgit. The rise in cost is mostly due to the cost of the costume for Cicak Man and SuperBro, each amounted 100 thousand Ringgit each.

== Film series ==
After this long development history, the Cicak Man films were produced by Norman Abdul Halim, Yusry Abdul Halim, Edry Abdul Halim
John Lucas and distributed by KRU, Grand Brilliance Sdn Bhd, PT Tripar Multi Vision Plus, Cathay-Keris Films Pte Ltd, the primary film production holding of KRU. They both directed by director Yusry Abdul Halim.

=== Cicak Man (2006) ===
Hairi (Saiful Apek), is a loser who lives in Metrofulus. While working in the lab, he accidentally drinks coffee that has been contaminated by a virus-infected gecko. He soon finds himself doing the most insane things, such as sticking to walls, making chirping cicak noises and adding bugs to his menu. He turns to his best friend and apartment mate, Danny (Yusry Abdul Halim), and begs him to find the reason behind his strange antics.

Meanwhile, the people of Metrofulus are constantly being infected by new strains of viruses, and the only cure seems to come only from Professor Klon's (Aznil Nawawi) lab. Suspecting something amiss, Hairi and Danny launch their own investigation and discover that Professor Klon is not only the creator of such viruses, but also has a more sinister plan up his sleeve, backed by his business partners, the Ginger Boys (played by Adlin Aman Ramlie and AC Mizal), who first tend to take revenge on Professor Klon's failed experiment on them; making their senses turn abnormal. Hairi soon makes use his new power as "Cicakman" and makes a fullstop to Professor Klon and Ginger Boys, while same time leading his love towards his lab partner, Tania (Fasha Sandha).

=== Cicak Man 2: Planet Hitam (2008) ===
Professor Klon (Aznil Nawawi) is back, this time, not only to overthrow the government and become the President of Metrofulus, but also to control the world's supply of fresh water through his plan; "Black Planet". When our blue planet has only 72 hours before turning black, Cicakman (Saiful Apek) comes to rescue.

But much to his surprise he faces his old enemies; the Ginger Boys, who return even more powerful as spiritual form as Ginger Ghosts (Adlin Aman Ramlie & AC Mizal). In addition, he is now faced with Professor Klon's hired assassin; Rrama (Tamara Bleszynski), an assassin who derives pleasure in killing as if it were a pure art form. As the situation starts taking a downward spiral, even a super hero needs help. But help appears in the most unexpected forms, including Danny (Yusry Abd Halim) his demised best friend, a powerful feng shui master, Miss Chee (Louisa Chong) and an unlikely party.

Apart from his heavy responsibilities to save the world, he also has his own personal dilemmas to address; that is Hairi vs Cicakman. He has to resolve his personal feelings towards Tania (Fasha Sandha), who is seeking the true identity of Cicakman and he also has to choose whether to sacrifice his own life or save Iman (Sharifah Amani), Danny's blind sister.

=== Cicak Man 3 (2015) ===
Set after 7 years of the event of Cicak Man 2: Planet Hitam. Metrofulus superhero, Cicakman had disappeared, many people say Cicakman is dead or retired. So, The new superhero has emerged known as Superbro has become a major superhero in Metrofulus and he is venerated by many people. The man named Man (Zizan Razak) has found a box left by former Cicakman (Saiful Apek) at the Cicakman monument.

== Cast and characters ==
List indicators
- Italics indicate a transition to a minor role, such as an extended flashback, after the initial appearance.
- A dark grey cell indicates the character was not in the film.

Cast	Film		
Cast	Cicak Man	Cicak Man 2: Planet Hitam	Cicak Man 3
Saiful Apek	Hairi Yatim / Cicakman	Hairi Yatim / Cicakman	
Fasha Sandha	Tania Ashraf	Tania Ashraf	
Yusry Abdul Halim	Danny	Danny	
Aznil Nawawi	Professor Klon	Professor Klon	
Tamara Bleszynski		Rrama	
Adlin Aman Ramlie	Ginger 1 / Ginger Ghost 1		
AC Mizal	Ginger 2 / Ginger Ghost 2		
Sharifah Amani		Iman	
Louisa Chong		Miss Chee	
Linda Onn		Amarr	
Jalaluddin Hassan	President Ramlan	President Ramlan	
Fahrin Ahmad		Cameraman	
Zizan Razak			Man/Cicakman
Lisa Surihani			Linda
Fizz Fairuz			Inspektor Adam
Bell Ngasari			Jojo
Adam Corrie			Hassan
Raykarl Iskandar			Boboy

== Reception ==
Cicak-Man created Malaysian movie history by grossing RM350,000 with an audience attendance number of 47,116 in its first day. The film eventually gave its production company, KRU Group of Companies, a RM6.7 million boost due to sales. Cicak-Man received many appreciation from various persons for the director's efforts even before it is released. One of them is Yusof Haslam alias "Six Million Dollar Man". David Teo as a film producer and CEO of Metrowealth International Group referred Cicak Man as a miracle with the response and difference shown in Malaysian filming industry. Besides film maker, ex-president of Persatuan Sutradara Malaysia (FDAM), Ahmad Ibrahim, praised this masterpiece created by Yusry and KRU. While there were people who praised Cicak Man, there were many others who criticised this film greatly. Mansor Putih in an interview by Harian Metro said that the film has no 'soul', aesthetic values and culture. There were individuals who compared between Cicak Man and Spider-Man, Batman, Superman, and other superhero films from Hollywood, but before it was released to public, the director, Yusry had advised people to not compare Cicak Man with other superhero characters because the budget is obviously lower compared to Hollywood productions.. Cicak Man 2: Planet Hitam was first released at the 13th Pusan International Film Festival on 5 October 2008 as world premiere for superheroes in Asia segment. Other two sessions was held on 7 October at the festival. In Malaysia, Singapore and Brunei, the film had been released on 11 December 2008 with the goal by the producer of a million tickets sold compared to 670 thousand tickets sold for Cicak Man. The film is expected to be released in Indonesia in January 2009.
