= Cicak Man 3 =

2015 film by Yusry KRU & Ghaz Abu Bakar

- Directed by: Yusry Abdul Halim; Ghaz Abu Bakar
- Produced by: Norman Abdul Hasilm; Tengku Iesta Tengku Alaudin; Gayati Su-Lin Pillai
- Starring: Zizan Razak; Lisa Surihani; Fizz Fairuz
- Music by: Edry Abd Halim
- Production companies: KRU Studios; Grand Brilliance; Astro Shaw
- Distributed by: TGV Cinemas; KRU Films; Primeworks Studios
- Release date: 12 March 2015 (Malaysia)
- Running time: 121 minutes
- Country: Malaysia
- Language: Malay
- Budget: MYR 3.5 million (US$800,000)
- Box office: MYR 2.53 million (US$577,000)

Cicak Man 3 (English: Gecko-Man 3) is a 2015 Malaysian Malay-language superhero film. It is the third installment of the Cicak Man series. The film was co-directed by Yusry Abdul Halim and Ghaz Abu Bakar and starred Zizan Razak who replaced Saiful Apek from the previous two movies.

The film, published by KRU Studios, takes place 7 years after the events of the second movie where the eponymous superhero has disappeared and a replacement known as SuperBro has taken his place as the number one hero in the city. The film premiered on 12 March 2015.

== Plot ==
Seven years on after the "Black Planet" incident, Cicakman the former superhero of Metrofulus has since disappeared, assumed by the public to have either died or retired. In his absence, a new superhero known as SuperBro has emerged to become the defender of Metrofulus.

The film starts with terrorists defeated by SuperBro. Man (Zizan Razak), on the verge of divorce with his wife Linda (Lisa Surihani), who takes custody of their son Boboy (Raykarl). Inspector Adam Faiz (Fizz Fairuz), brother of the Commissioner of Police, Commissioner Kahar and Linda's former friend, is into Linda.

With Man felt troubled by his situation and ignoring the help of his friend, Jojo (Bell Ngasri), he discovers an emblem of Cicakman that belonged to his statue. Man places the emblem back at the statue and discovers a box belonging to the former Cicakman. He goes home and gets into a conversation with a girl. while Man walks away to his house, opens the box he had found and discovers he has been chosen as the new Cicakman.

Meanwhile, the girl Man had been in conversation with gets harassed by a motorcycle gang. As she was even close to being gang-raped and this damsel in distress scenario is getting more serious, So he wears the new suit, and with a sudden confidence goes down to halt the attack hours later. Cicakman fights the gangsters and loses, having yet to discover his true potential and gets him beaten, because he did not check the whole content of the box entirely. In that box is also contained the serum that will transform him into Cicakman. Only this time, he really starts finding his true potential. He gradually unlocks an ability with his tongue, his moves in combat, wall climbing and so. So Cicakman once again halts the gangsters for harassing the same girl again. But this time Cicakman defeats them and wins the day.

Within these chapters are the struggle of Man reconnecting with his family, the intrusion of Adam, and his attempt to save the day when a train gets hijacked by a group of gangsters, only to have SuperBro intervene and finish the job. The crowd disregard Cicakman who saved the day and favours SuperBro more. Later Cicakman gets beaten by SuperBro.

Man intervenes Linda's new job as a singer at a local bar (provided by Adam), at this point he discovers how much Adam is into Linda and founds a folder covered in blood containing a photo of Adam and other man.

As Man returns, he discovers Jojo got sodomised by SuperBro. He found a robotic stick stuck up Jojo's anus.

The next day, Man is supposed to attend his son's Sports day. He deliberately misses a bus to the venue and instead investigate a supposed suspicious truck he found near the bar where Linda sings. A roof on a car chase ensues, but Cicakman gets incapacitated with a gun, shot at his chest. However the superhero founds his full potential of regeneration. So he went to the Sports day venue extremely late and trying to explain to Linda why he missed his son's Sports day. He tells her the truth, which didn't work out well and then gets told off by Linda. At the same time, Adam threatens the son to bury him alive for eavesdropping.

Man is at his breaking point, he burns his suit out of despair. As he walks close to a wall, he sees a wanted poster of the same man from the photo with Adam. Realizing Adam is a criminal, Man retrieves back his burned outfit.

Cicakman proves himself a capable hero by sending the pictures of Adam and the gangster leader to the police.

Adam brings Linda to the pre-jubilee event where she will sing. Adam proposes his love and marriage to Linda, but reacts violently when he gets rejected. He shots an innocent sound mixer guy in the head. He ties the mother and son and challenges Cicakman for a battle.

Cicakman comes to save the day, and a fight ensues. There are two points where the villain shoots an explosion of round ammunition. The occupants of the Ferris Wheel got into trouble and were hanging for their life, but Cicakman managed to save them. SuperBro aimed another explosive round on a baby's carriage. Cicakman tried to stop the explosion by throwing the carriage out of the funfair crowd. Along the process, Cicakman got injured badly and was unable to stand up properly to fight. Due to his regenerative powers, he only needed to wait for his injuries to heal themselves before continue fighting until the villain's battery ran out. He managed to beat the villain then and kicked him into the sea. The villain rose up from the water, only for his battery to drain out and he got electrocuted and blown into fireworks.

Later, Cicakman is awarded for his bravery, and he took off his mask to prove that he will not receive the award as Cicakman but as a responsible citizen of Metrofulus and a father. The Mayor of Metrofulus had also erected a statue of Cicakman to commemorate his service.

== Cast ==
- Zizan Razak as Man / Cicak-Man
- Lisa Surihani as Linda
- Fizz Fairuz as Inspector Adam Faiz / SuperBro
- Bell Ngasri as Jojo
- Raykarl Iskandar as Boboy
- Adam Corrie as Hassan
- Azizah Mahzan as Mrs. Zaleha
- Rashidi Ishak as Commissioner Kahar
- Sathiya as Mayor of Metrofulus

Zizan Razak also provides the film's theme song, "Adiwira", alongside the KRU trio.

== Production ==
The film's principal photography had taken place in Kuala Lumpur and Johor. The production costed at around 4 million Ringgit, with the cost of producing the costumes for Cicakman and Super-Bro amounted to 100 thousand Ringgit each.

== Reception ==
Cicak Man 3 had grossed MYR 1 million on the fourth day of the film's premiere. After the tenth day, it had collected to a total of MYR 2.5 million.

== See also ==
- Cicak Man
- Cicakman 2: Planet Hitam
- Cicak Man (film series)
