= Akademi Fantasia season 11 =

Akademi Fantasia
- Season 11
- Hosted by: Zizan Razak; Faizal Ismail; Jihan Muse
- Judges: Ramli M.S. Raja Azura
- Winner: Mhd Firman Bansir
- Runner-up: Mohd Razman Abd Aziz
- Finals venue: Stadium MBSA, Shah Alam

Release
- Original network: Astro Ria
- Original release: 1 September – 9 November 2014

Season chronology
- ← Previous; Season 10 Next → Season 12

The eleventh season of Akademi Fantasia, also branded as AF2014, premiered on 1 September 2014 and concluded on 9 November 2014 on the Astro Ria television channel. Ramli M.S. and Raja Azura joined the judging panel.

On 7 September 2014, during the opening of first concert, Hattan was revealed to be Principal for this season. Zizan Razak returned as a host and at the end of first concert, Faizal Ismail was announced as a co-host., while Jihan Musa was announced as host for Diari Akademi Fantasia.

On 9 November 2014, Mhd Firman Bansir was announced as the season's winner, making the second winner from Tawau, Sabah, defeating Mohd Razman Abd Aziz. Twelve students competed in the season. Auditions were held in four cities in June 2014.

== Auditions ==
Auditions were held in the following cities:

- KSL Resorts & Hotel, Johor Bahru - 13 & 14 June 2014
- Sunway Hotel, Seberang Jaya, Penang - 14 & 15 June 2014
- Novotel Hotel, Kota Kinabalu, Sabah - 21 & 22 June 2014
- Kuala Lumpur - 21 & 22 June 2014

=== List of songs during auditions ===
Songs for female

- "Bosan" – Stacy
- "Teringin" - Shima
- "Patah Seribu" - Shila Amzah
- "Lebih Indah" - Datuk Siti Nurhaliza
- "Angin Syurga" - Misha Omar

Songs for male

- "Penglipurlara" – Hazama
- "Bahagiamu Deritaku" – Hafiz
- "Tetap Menantimu" – Nomad
- "Romancinta" – Mojo
- "Tinggal Kenangan" – Saleem

Contestants were required to be between the ages of 18 and 35, and are Malaysian and Singaporean citizens. As a part of conditions made by the principal, Datuk Hattan was there will be no song made from Indonesia allowed to be performed by this year contestants. He said "There are many more local song that can be performed and we should be proud of it".

== Students ==
ages stated are at time of contest)

Student	Age	Hometown	Rank
Mohammad Firman bin Bansir (Firman)	25	Tawau, Sabah	Champion
Mohammad Razman bin Abdul Aziz (Aman)	21	Melaka	Runner-up
Ikhwal Hafiz bin Ismail (Ewal)	22	Teluk Intan, Perak	3rd place
Syamila Nuhair binti Zainordi (Nuha)	21	Perak	4th place
Adeline Joyce Masidah (Adel)	21	Kota Kinabalu, Sabah	5th place
Azwan bin Satar (Azwan)	30	Batu Pahat, Johor	6th
Nina Nadira binti Naharuddin (Nina)	21	Shah Alam, Selangor	7th
Muhammad Zharif bin Mohammad Kamil (Zarif)	26	Johor	8th
Nor Aziha binti Mohammad Salleh (Ziha)	20	Johor	9th
Muna Shahirah binti Munadi (Muna)	20	Johor Bahru, Johor	10th
Muhammad Fareezuan bin Adnan (Farez)	19	Kuala Lumpur	11th
Walfadhilah binti Suhaizat (Wawa)	19	Selangor	12th

== Concert summaries ==
=== Week 1 ===
- Original airdate: 7 September 2014
- Theme: Student's Choice
- Guest judge: Tam (Spider)

Student	Song
Ziha	"Angan Angan" (Raja Ema)
Zarif	"Hanya Aku" (Hyper Act)
Muna	"Hilang" (Najwa Latif)
Azwan	"Umpan Jinak Di Air Tenang" (Dato' Ahmad Jais)
Nuha	"Tunggu Sekejap" (Tan Sri P. Ramlee)
Firman	"Relaku Pujuk" (Spider)
Nina	"Gelora Jiwa" (Yuna)
Aman	"Andai Ku Tahu" (Ungu)
Farez	"Nirmala" (Dato' Siti Nurhaliza)
Adel	"Ku Ada Kamu" (Adira)
Wawa	"Hujung Dunia" (Hanie Soraya)
Ewal	"Di Alam Fana Cinta" (Fotograf)

- Eliminated: No elimination.

=== Week 2 ===
- Original airdate: 14 September 2014
- Theme: 90s
- Guest judge: Amy Mastura

Student	Song
Ewal	"Ada" (Dato' M. Nasir)
Wawa	"Wajah Kekasih" (Dato' Siti Nurhaliza)
Farez	"Langkah Seiringan" (Exists)
Adel	"Kalau Mencari Teman" (Ziana Zain)
Azwan	"Bernafas Dalam Lumpur" (Wings)
Nina	"Zombie" (The Cranberries)
Firman	"Gerhana Cinta Luka" (Iklim)
Muna	"Diam Diam Jatuh Cinta" (Ramlah Ram)
Zarif	"Disana Menanti Disini Menunggu" (Ukays)
Ziha	"Kau Teristimewa" (Aishah)
Aman	"More Than Words" (Extreme)
Nuha	"Setelah Aku Kau Miliki" (Shima)

- Eliminated: Walfadhilah binti Suhaizat (Wawa)

=== Week 3 ===
- Original airdate: 21 September 2014
- Theme: Hitz Fantasia
- Guest judge: Dato' Aznil Haji Nawawi

Student	Song
Adel	"Jahat" (Stacy)
Firman	"Relakan Jiwa" (Hazama)
Zarif	"Aduh Saliha" (Mawi)
Muna	"Percayalah" (Indah)
Farez	"Awan Nano" (Hafiz)
Ziha	"Hatimu Milikku" (Nera)
Nina	"Ilusi" (Adira)
Aman	"Hanya Kau Yang Mampu" (Aizat)
Ewal	"Kebahagiaan Dalam Perpisahan" (Shahir)
Nuha	"Aku Lebih Tahu" (Mila)
Azwan	"Izinku Pergi" (Kaer)

- Eliminated: Muhammad Fareezuan bin Adnan (Farez)

=== Week 4 ===
- Original airdate: 28 September 2014
- Theme: Tribute to Malaysian Composer
- Guest judge: Ziana Zain

Student	Song	Composer
Azwan	"Aduh" (Ajai)	Ajai
Adel	"Kesetiaan" (Siti Sarah)	Ajai
Aman	"Tidak Pernah Berjumpa" (Forteen)	Edry Abdul Halim
Nuha	"Sebelah Jiwaku" (Jaclyn Victor)	Edry Abdul Halim
Zarif	"Gerimis Mengundang" (Slam)	Saari Amri
Muna	"Kekal" (Ziana Zain)	Salman Sharif
Ewal	"Lena Diulit Intan" (Wings)	Saari Amri
Ziha	"Seandainya Masih Ada Cinta" (Dayang Nurfaizah)	Ajai
Firman	"Samrah Mentari" (Dato' Jamal Abdillah)	Pak Ngah
Nina	"Dondang Dendang" (Noraniza Idris)	Pak Ngah

- Eliminated: Muna Shahirah binti Munadi (Muna)

=== Week 5 ===
- Original airdate: 5 October 2014
- Theme: Praise & Worship
- Guest judge: Nash (Lefthanded)

Student	Song
Azwan	"Mimpi Laila" (Yasin)
Ziha	"Cinta Adam dan Hawa" (Misha Omar)
Zarif	"Aku Yang Berdosa" (Shahir)
Nina	"Ku Mohon" (Datuk Sheila Majid)
Nuha	"Jaga Dia Untukku" (Dato' Siti Nurhaliza)
Adel	"Jagalah Diri" (Jaclyn Victor)
Firman	"Meniti Titian Usang" (Search)
Aman	"PadaMu Ku Bersujud" (Afgan)
Ewal	"Ketulusan Hati" (Anuar Zain)

- Eliminated: No elimination.

=== Week 6 ===
- Original airdate: 12 October 2014
- Theme: Rock
- Guest judge: Awie & Edrie Hashim

Student	Song
Nuha	"What's Up?" (4 Non Blondes)
Aman	"Itu Kamu" (Estranged)
Azwan	"Apa Nak Dikata" (XPDC)
Nina	"Layar Impian" (Ella)
Zarif	"Hukum Karma" (Wings)
Ziha	"Luka Dilukai" (Shima)
Ewal	"Fantasia Bulan Madu" (Search)
Firman	"Kerja Gila" (Search)
Adele	"Rolling in The Deep" (Adele)

- Eliminated: Nor Aziha binti Mohammad Salleh (Ziha)

=== Week 7 ===
- Original airdate: 19 September 2014
- Theme: Remy & Sally (Tribute to Tan Sri P. Ramlee & Puan Sri Saloma)
- Guest judge: Erra Fazira

Student	Song
Adel	"Jelingan Mata" (Saloma)
Aman	"Tiada Kata Secantik Bahasa" (P. Ramlee)
Nuha	"Engkau Laksana Bulan" (P. Ramlee)
Nina	"Itulah Sayang" (P. Ramlee)
Ewal	"Jeritan Batinku" (P. Ramlee)
Firman	"Jangan Tinggal Daku" (P. Ramlee)
Zarif	"Ya Habibi Ali Baba" (P. Ramlee)
Azwan	"Hanya Dikau" (P. Ramlee)

- Eliminated: Adeline Joyce Masidah (Adel)

=== Week 8 ===
- Original airdate: 26 October 2014
- Theme: Media's Choice
- Guest judge: Roslen Fadzil

Solo

Student	Song	Result
Aman	"Kasih Latifah" (Spider)	Bottom 3
Zarif	"Romancinta" (Mojo)	Eliminated
Ewal	"Maha Karya Cinta" (Faizal Tahir)	Safe
Nuha	"Kisah Dongeng" (Stacy)	Safe
Firman	"She's Gone" (Steelheart)	Safe
Azwan	"Cinta Nusantara" (Sheqal)	Safe
Nina	"Rescue" (Yuna)	Eliminated

Duet/group

Student	Song
Firman & Nuha	"Cerita Cinta" (Jaclyn Victor & Rio Febrian)
Aman & Nina	"Ku Merindu" (Ella & Shah)
Zarif, Azwan & Ewal	"Satu" (Tan Sri SM Salim & Zainal Abidin

- Eliminated: Nina Nadira binti Naharuddin (Nina) & Muhammad Zharif bin Mohammad Kamil (Zarif)

=== Week 9 (semi-finals) ===
- Original airdate: 2 November 2014
- Theme: Student's Choice
- Guest judge: Fauziah Latiff

Solo

Student	Song	Result
Firman	"Nur Nilam Sari" (Awie & Search)	Safe
Nuha	"Ku Pendam Sebuah Duka" (Dato' Khadijah Ibrahim)	Bottom 2
Azwan	"Cinta Sesungguhnya" (Sabhi Saddi)	Eliminated
Ewal	"Rude" (Magic!)	Safe
Aman	"Sedetik Lebih" (Anuar Zain)	Safe

Duet

Student	Guest singer	Song
Aman	Masya Masyitah	"Kalau Cinta" (Alif Aziz & Joanna)
Azwan	Noraniza Idris	"Tanda Kasih" (Ahmad Mahmud & Rahmah Rahmat)
Ewal	Adira	"Muara Hati" (Hafiz Suip & Dato' Siti Nurhaliza)
Firman	Joey (BPR)	"Seribu Tahun Takkan Mungkin" (BPR)
Nuha	Mus (May)	"Cintamu Mekar Dihati" (May)

- Eliminated: Azwan bin Satar (Azwan)
- AF SERAP: Adeline Joyce Masidah (Adel)

Adel was chosen by the faculty to be re-entered into the competition and will compete in the final week.

=== Week 10 (Final) ===
- Original airdate: 9 November 2014
- Theme: Grand Finale
- Guest judge: Amy Search

Student	Song	Result
Adel	"I Have Nothing" (Whitney Houston) "Hati"; Composer: Kuncidemak; Lyric: Kuncidemak	Fifth place
Ewal	"Kembalikan Semula"; Composer: DJ Fuzz; Lyric: Adeep Nahar "Matahari" (Hafiz Suip)	Third place
Nuha	"Pertama Kali"; Composer: Nuha; Lyric: Nuha "Beribu Sesalan" (3 Suara)	Fourth Place
Aman	"Mewangi" (Akim & The Majistret) "Without You"; Composer: Awi Rafael; Lyric: Awi Rafael	Runner-up
Firman	"Kejoraku Bersatu" (Search) "Di Pintumu"; Composer: Dato' M. Nasir; Lyric: Dato' M. Nasir	Champion

- Champion: Mohammad Firman bin Bansir (Firman)
- Runner-up: Mohammad Razman bin Abdul Aziz (Aman)
- Third place: Ikhwal Hafiz bin Ismail (Ewal)
- Fourth place: Syamila Nuhair binti Zainordi (Nuha)
- Fifth place: Adeline Joyce Masidah (Adel)

== Elimination chart ==
Rank	Weekly Concerts										
Rank	Student	1 (7/Sep)	2 (14/Sep)	3 (21/Sep)	4 (28/Sep)	5 (5/Oct)	6 (12/Oct)	7 (19/Oct)	8 (26/Oct)	9 (2/Nov)	Final (9/Nov)

== Elimination order ==
Week:		1 (7/Sept)^{1}	2 (14/Sept)	3 (21/Sept)	4 (28/Sept)	5 (5/Oct)^{1}	6 (12/Oct)	7 (19/Oct)	8 (26/Oct)^{2}	Semifinals (2/Nov)^{3}	Finals (9/Nov)
Place	Contestant	Result									
1	Firman	Saved	3rd	2nd	2nd	Saved	2nd	2nd	4th	1st	Winner
2	Aman	Saved	6th	3rd	6th	Saved	6th	3rd	5th (Bottom 3)	2nd	Runner-up
3	Ewal	Saved	9th	5th	4th	Saved	3rd	7th (Bottom 3)	2nd	3rd	Third
4	Nuha	Saved	5th	6th	5th	Saved	7th (Bottom 3)	4th	3rd	4th (Bottom 2)	4th
5	Adel	Saved	2nd	4th	3rd	Saved	4th	Eliminated	-	Saved	5th
6	Azwan	Saved	1st	1st	1st	Saved	1st	1st	1st	Eliminated	
7	Nina	Saved	4th	9th (Bottom 3)	9th (Bottom 3)	Saved	5th	6th (Bottom 3)	Eliminated		
8	Zarif	Saved	7th	10th (Bottom 3)	7th	Saved	8th (Bottom 3)	5th	Eliminated		
9	Ziha	Saved	8th	8th	8th (Bottom 3)	Saved	Eliminated				
10	Muna	Saved	11th (Bottom 3)	7th	Eliminated						
11	Farez	Saved	10th (Bottom 3)	Eliminated							
12	Wawa	Saved	Eliminated								

The student was re-entered into the competition through "AFSERAP" (Faculty's choice).

- ^Note 1 There was no elimination on the first and fifth week .
- ^Note 2 There was a double elimination on the eight week .
- ^Note 3 Adel was chosen by the faculty(among all the eliminated students)to be re-entered into the competition through AFSERAP and it was announced at the end of the ninth concert by the principal.

== Cast members ==
=== Hosts ===
- Zizan Razak - Host of concert Akademi Fantasia
- Faizal Ismail - Host of concert Akademi Fantasia
- Jihan Muse - Host of Diari Akademi Fantasia

=== Professional trainers ===
- Hattan - Principal
- Siti Hajar Ismail - Vocal Presentation
- Linda Jasmine - Choreographer
- Fatimah Abu Bakar - English Language Consultant & Counsellor
- Marlia Musa - Drama & Acting
- Acis - Music Director

=== Judges ===
- Ramli M.S.
- Raja Azura

=== Juri Juara ===
- Stacy
- Hafiz

== Season statistics ==
- Total number of students: 12
- Oldest student: Azwan Satar, 30 years old
- Youngest students: Walfadhilah Suhaizat & Muhammad Fareezuan Adnan, 19 years old
- Tallest student: Muhammad Fareezuan Adnan
- Shortest student: Nor Aziha Md Salleh
- Student with the most consecutive highest votes: Azwan Satar, 6 times
- Student with the most collective highest votes: Azwan Satar, 6 times
- Student with the most bottom three appearances: Nor Aziha Md Salleh, 4 times
- Students with no bottom three appearances: Mhd Firman Bansir
