= Macam Macam Aznil =

- Genre: Talkshow
- Starring: Aznil Nawawi
- Opening theme: Macam-macam Aznil
- Ending theme: Macam-macam Aznil
- Country of origin: Malaysia
- Original language: Malay

Production
- Production locations: Kuala Lumpur, Malaysia
- Running time: 60 minutes
- Production company: Measat Broadcast Network Systems

Original release
- Network: Astro Ria
- Release: 2004 – 2011

Macam Macam Aznil (commonly Macam-macam Aznil) is a family talk show hosted by Aznil Hj Nawawi.

== 2007 ==
- Best Talk Show (Anugerah Skrin 2007)

== 2005 ==
- Best Talk Show (Asian Television Award 2005) * Best TV Host (Anugerah Sri Angkasa 2005) - Aznil Nawawi

== 2004 ==
- Best TV Show (Anugerah Sri Angkasa 2004)
