= Aidil Aziz =

Malaysian actor (born 1987)

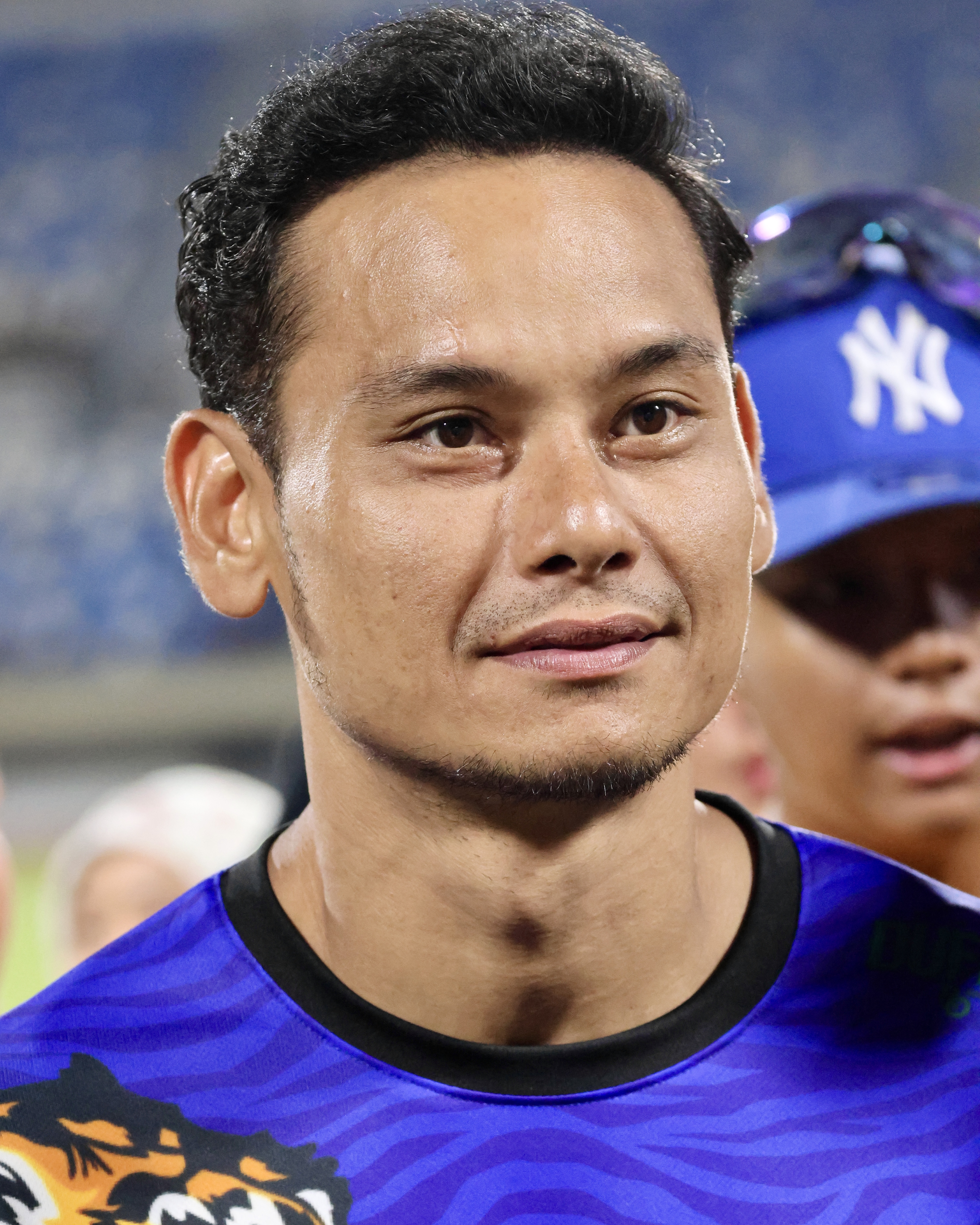
- Aidil in 2024
- Born: Mohd Aidil bin Abdul Aziz; 26 July 1987 (age 38); Seri Kembangan, Selangor, Malaysia
- Occupation: Actor
- Years active: 2009–present
- Spouse: Fasha Sandha (m. 2019)
- Children: 1

Mohd Aidil bin Abdul Aziz (born 26 July 1987) is a Malaysian actor who gained popularity for his portrayal of Saiful in the drama Saiful Nita on Slot Samarinda TV3.

== Career ==
After playing a major part in the drama television series Saiful Nita, which aired on Slot Samarinda TV3, Aidil's career took off. He was well recognized for his portrayal of the role Saiful, which he did with actress Kilafairy under the direction of Emi Maziah. His acting abilities were subsequently demonstrated in movies like Kapoww, Evolution of KL Drift 2, and Kanang anak Langkau: The Iban Warrior.

Aidil has also taken an active part in a number of dramas, some of which have achieved considerable acclaim. Akademi Polis (2009), Nilapura (2011), Trilogi Cinta 2 (2012), Saiful Nita (2012), Hujan (2013), Asmara Luna (2013), Romi Cinta Julia (2014), Tabir Zulaikha (2015), Hati Perempuan (2015), Lara Terindah (2016), Kamar Kamariah (2018), Cinta Lemon Madu (2018) and Vila Ghazara (2018) are a few of these works.

Following his controversy in 2016, Aidil's debut drama is Vila Ghazara, directed by Feroz Kader. According to him, he learned a lot from the incident, particularly about how to evaluate friendships in situations when it is sufficient for him to keep positive relationships with Allah and his family. Nevertheless, he said that his growing workload with theater acts compelled him to temporarily halt his business Kingmangifera.

== Controversy ==
Aidil and two of his friends appeared before the Kuala Lumpur High Court on 7 October 2016, charged with violating Section 39B of the Dangerous Drug Deed of 1952 by distributing marijuana drugs weighing 465.61 grams (16.424 oz). If proven guilty, they could face punishment under Section 39B(2) of the same deed, which stipulates the mandatory death penalty. After entering a not guilty plea, he was released from the hanging.

== Personal life ==
Aidil was born in Seri Kembangan, Selangor on 26 July 1987. Because both of his parents are from Negeri Sembilan, he speaks the dialect fluently. Aidil has developed a passion in football, where he frequently plays as an attacker and looks up to Cristiano Ronaldo.

On 18 November 2018, Aidil proposed to actress Fasha Sandha, and only their closest friends and family were present at the event. Before formally announcing their engagement, the couple had previously denied it. They officially married at Tuanku Syed Putra Jamalullail Mosque, Kangar on 9 March 2019, and together they have a daughter named Aisha Amaira (born 7 August 2021).

== Filmography ==
=== Film ===
Year	Title	Role	Notes
2010	Kapoww	Astromen Sedut	The first film
2010	Evolusi KL Drift 2	Criminal 8	
2017	Kanang Anak Langkau: The Iban Warrior	Koperal Mohd Nasir Mohd Nordin	
2024	Harimau Malaya: The Untold Journey	Taufiq	
TBA	Takluk: Inspirasi Lahad Datu		Post-production

=== Drama ===
Year	Title	Role	TV channel	Notes
2009	Akademi Polis		TV9	
2010	Bola Cinta	Jamal	TV2	
2011	Nilapura	Laksamana Daka	TV3	
2011	Mistik Alam Hitam		Astro Ria & Astro Prima	Episode: "Banglo Kayu"
2012	Trilogi Cinta 2	Shah	TV1	
2012	Masyitah		TV1	
2012	Saiful Nita	Saiful	TV3	
2012	Nur Melinda	Hakim	Astro Prima	
2012	Metro Skuad	Malik	TV2	
2012	Ms. Cinta	Nik	TV1	
2012	Cinta Shanxi	Zariq	TV1	
2013	Dan Calonnya Adalah	Karim	Tonton	
2013	Tanah Kubur (Season 9)	Alim	Astro Oasis	
2013	Selamat Malam Kekasih	Misyal	TV AlHijrah	
2013	Ramadan Ravi		TV2	
2013	Hujan	Hisyam	TV3	
2013	Asmara Luna	Adam	TV3	
2013	Impak Cinta	Hafiz	TV1	
2013	Dalam Setiap Sujud	Daniel	TV9	
2014	Romi Cinta Julia	Jeffri	TV3	
2014	Kifarah: Zuriat	Nasrul	TV3	
2015	Keluarga Karaoke	Shah	Astro Mustika HD	
2015	Tabir Zulaikha	Feroz	TV3	
2015	Hati Perempuan	Nizam	TV3	
2015	Menongkah Kasih	Aidil	TV9	
2015	Bila Hati Telah Hitam	Adam	Astro Oasis	Episode: Derhaka
2016	Kifarah Mistik		TV3	Episode: Malar Hitam
2016	Lara Terindah	Andi	TV3	
2016	Qanun 99		Astro Oasis	Episode: Isteriku Lelaki
2018	Monalisa		Astro Prima	
2018	Isteri Dalam Sangkar	Tengku Haziq	HyppTV	
2018	Cinta Lemon Madu	Firash	TV3	
2018	Vila Ghazara	Adrian	TV3	
2019	Pujaan Hati Kanda	Syafiq	TV3	
2019	Kamar Kamariah	Hisyam	TV3	
2020	Dendam Cinta Arissa	Zaki	Astro Ria	
2020	Camelia	Jamal	TV3	
2020	Seindah Tujuh Warna Pelangi	Yazid	TV3	
2021	Suara Hati	Naim	Astro Prima	
2021	Terlerai Noktah	Doktor Rudi	TV3	
2022	Tumpang Lalu Bang	Sufian	TV9	
2022	Imamku Okey	Amir	TV Okey	
2022	Anak Beranak Abe Yie	Sam	TV3	
2022	Rampas Cintaku	Shahrul	IQIYI	
2023	Bukan Hanya Sekadar Cinta	Pak Long Shah	TV3	
2023	Misi Seramedi	Khalid	TV Okey	

=== Telefilm ===
Year	Title	Role	TV channel
2009	Menantu 3 Rasa		TV1
2012	Demi Masa	Rahimi	Astro Oasis
2012	Cinta Bola	Izwan	TV1
2012	Adi dan Meon	Adi	TV2
2012	Lorong Cahaya	Amin	TV3
2013	Cinta Gila	Zaman	TV3
2013	Loncat	Cikgu Rashid	TVi
2013	Pesona Ayah	Armin	TV3
2013	Kampungku dan Aidiladha	Arman	TV3
2013	Di Penghujung Dendam	Haikal	TV1
2013	Rotibom Maktom		TV9
2013	Siti Aisyah		TV1
2013	Beranak Dalam Kubur	Man	Astro Prima
2017	Parut	Maliki	TV2
2017	Menanti Pelangi	Imran	TV1
2018	Qalbu	Syukri	TV3
2019	Alamak Boss!!	Aidil	TV Okey
2021	Epilog: Aku Yang Kau Gelar Isteri	Ustaz Omar	TV3
2021	Mencari Siratul Mustaqeem	Majid	TV3

=== Television ===
Year	Title	TV channel	Notes
2013	Betul ke Bohong?	Astro Warna	
2013	Liga Lawak Superstar	TV3	
