= Akademi Fantasia season 12 =

Akademi Fantasia
- Season 12
- Hosted by: Zizan Razak; Faizal Ismail; Nana Mahazan
- Judges: Ramli M.S; Rozita Che Wan
- Winner: Mohammad Sufie Rashid
- Runner-up: Syameel Aqmal Mohd Fodzly

Release
- Original network: Astro Ria
- Original release: 3 August – 11 October 2015

Season chronology
- ← Previous; Season 11 Next → Season 13

The twelfth season of Akademi Fantasia, also branded as AF2015, premiered on 3 August 2015 and concluded on 11 October 2015 on the Astro Ria television channel. Zizan Razak and Faizal Ismail continued to host the show once again, while Ramli M.S. returned as a judge and Rozita Che Wan joined the judging panel.

The professional trainers for this season were announced in a press conference for media, which include trainers from previous season, Linda Jasmine, Fatimah Abu Bakar, Acis, Shahrol, Que Haidar & Fauziah Nawi, while Edry Abdul Halim has been announced as the new principal for this season.

On 11 October 2015, Mohammad Sufie Rashid was announced as the season's winner, making the first winner from Singapore, who defeated Syameel Aqmal Mohd Fodzly.

== Auditions ==
Auditions were held in the following cities:

- Bayview Hotel, Penang - 2 & 3 May 2015
- Novotel Hotel, Kota Kinabalu, Sabah - 9 & 10 May 2015
- Berjaya Waterfront, Johor - 23 & 24 May 2015
- National Sports Complex Kuala Lumpur - 30 & 31 May 2015

=== List of songs during auditions ===
Songs for female

- "Gilalah" – Stacy
- "Di Pintu Syurga" - Dayang Nurfaizah
- "Sesal Separuh Nyawa" - Alyah
- "Ya Maulai" - Datuk Siti Nurhaliza
- "ChaROssa

Songs for male

- "Mewangi" – Akim & The Majistret
- "Matahari" – Hafiz
- "Pencuri" – Mark Adam
- "All of Me" – John Legend
- "Harus Terpisah" – Cakra Khan
- "Umpan Jinak Di Air Tenang" – Ahmad Jais
- "Pelesit Kota" – Search
- "Sedetik Lebih" – Anuar Zain

Contestants were required to be between the ages of 18 and 35, and are Malaysian and Singaporean citizens.

== Students ==
Ages stated are at time of contest.

| Student | Age | Hometown | Ranking |
|---|---|---|---|
| Mohd. Sufie bin Rashid (Sufi) | 24 | Singapore | Champion |
| Syameel Aqmal bin Mohd. Fodzly (Syamel) | 22 | Kuala Lumpur | Runner-up |
| Nurnajmi Nabila binti Samsaidi (Bila) | 19 | Kuala Lumpur | 3rd place |
| Muhammad Shahrul Amin bin Kamarozzaman (Sharul) | 19 | Negeri Sembilan | 4th place |
| Allyssa Joanne Anak Jambi (Lisa) | 22 | Sarawak | 5th |
| Ang Hui San (Rachel) | 23 | Pahang | 6th |
| Muhd. Ikhwan Alif bin Salim (Iqwan) | 20 | Perak | 7th |
| Anthonasius Jadil (Openg) | 23 | Sabah | 8th |
| Muhd. Amyroulfarouk bin Mohd. Nor (Faroq) | 23 | Melaka | 9th |
| Aziah binti Awang (Aziah) | 21 | Tuaran, Sabah | 10th |
| Nurhusnina Haziqah binti Naharuddin (Ziqa) | 19 | Johor | 11th |
| Sharifah Nabilah binti Syed Azhar (Ifa) | 21 | Kedah | 12th |

== Concert summaries ==
=== Week 1 ===
- Aired date: 9 August 2015
- Guest judges: -

| Student | Song | Result |
|---|---|---|
| Arisa | "Gemilang" (Jaclyn Victor) | Eliminated |
| Aziah | "Teruskanlah" (Agnes Monica) | Safe |
| Bila | "Hanya Di Mercu" (Ayu Damit) | Safe |
| Dalila | "Karma" (Cokelat) | Eliminated |
| Faroq | "Marry Me" (Mark Adam) | Safe |
| Ifa | "Rindu" (Hetty Koes Endang) | Safe |
| Iqwan | "Ku Akui" (Hafiz Suip) | Safe |
| Lisa | "Wanita Terbahagia" (BCL) | Safe |
| Openg | "Pelangi Petang" (Sudirman) | Safe |
| Rachel | "Begawan Solo" (Frances Yap) | Safe |
| Sharul | "Kun Anta" (Humood Alkhuder) | Safe |
| Sufi | "Kamelia" (Sweet Charity) | Safe |
| Syahid | "Joget Angan Tak Sudah" (Jay Jay) | Eliminated |
| Syamel | "Potret" (Akim & The Majistret) | Safe |
| Wili | "Terima Kasih Cinta" (Afgan) | Eliminated |
| Ziqa | "Nakal" (Gigi) | Safe |

- Best performances: Nurhusnina Haziqah binti Naharuddin (Ziqa)
- Eliminated: Sharmaine Arissa binti Shahrudin (Arisa), Nurdalila binti Mohamed Yusof (Dalila), Khairul Mohammad Syahid bin Abu Hassan (Syahid) & Wili (Suili George)

=== Week 2 ===
- Aired date: 16 August 2015
- Theme: Love
- Guest judges: Amy Search

| Student | Song | Result |
|---|---|---|
| Iqwan | "Lelaki Seperti Aku" (Alif Satar) | Bottom 2 |
| Lisa | "Rindu Padanya" (Camelia) | Safe |
| Sufi | "Kehilangan" (Firman Siagian) | Safe |
| Ziqa | "Percayalah" (Indah Ruhaila) | Bottom 3 |
| Sharul | "Lagu Untukmu" (Meet Uncle Hussain) | Safe |
| Faroq | "Aku yang Tersakiti" (Judika) | Safe |
| Ifa | "Kabut Serangkai Mawar" (Zaiton Sameon) | Eliminated |
| Syamel | "Thinking Out Loud" (Ed Sheeran) | Safe |
| Rachel | "Sayang" (Shae) | Safe |
| Openg | "Dashyat" (Mojo) | Safe |
| Bila | "All About The Bass" (Meghan Trainor) | Safe |
| Aziah | "Terbaik Bagimu" (Dato' Siti Nurhaliza) | Safe |

- Best performances: Mohammad Sufie bin Rashid (Sufi)
- Eliminated: Sharifah Nabilah binti Syed Azhar (Ifa)
- Guest performances: "Apa Khabar" (Joe Flizzow) & "Not For Sale" (Stacy)

=== Week 3 ===
- Aired date: 23 August 2015
- Theme: 90s
- Guest judges: Amelina

| Student | Song | Result |
|---|---|---|
| Lisa | "Ngajat Tampi" (Noraniza Idris) | Safe |
| Syamel | "Warisan Wanita Terakhir" (Teacher's Pet) | Bottom 3 |
| Aziah | "Yang Indah Yang Hangat" (Amelina) | Safe |
| Iqwan | "Didalam Dilema" (KRU) | Safe |
| Openg | "Takdir dan Waktu" (Mega) | Safe |
| Ziqa | "G.I.G" (Elite) | Eliminated |
| Sharul | "Apokalips" (M. Nasir) | Bottom 2 |
| Bila | "Cindai" (Dato' Siti Nurhaliza) | Safe |
| Faroq | "Bila Resah" (Anuar Zain) | Safe |
| Rachel | "Kau dan Aku" (Ning Baizura) | Safe |
| Sufi | "Black or White" (Michael Jackson) | Safe |

- Best performances: Nurnajmi Nabila binti Samsaidi (Bila)
- Eliminated: Nurhusnina Haziqah binti Naharuddin (Ziqa)

=== Week 4 ===
- Aired date: 30 August 2015
- Theme: -
- Guest judges: Adlin Aman Ramlie

| Student | Song | Result |
|---|---|---|
| Openg | "Suzanna" (M. Osman) | Safe |
| Bila | "Pelangi Senja" (Stacy) | Saved |
| Rachel | "Bahtera Merdeka" (Aishah) | Safe |
| Sharul | "Bangkit" (Aril Pilus) | Safe |
| Iqwan | "Fatwa Pujangga" (S. Affendy) | Safe |
| Sufi | "Mana Mungkin" (Black) | Safe |
| Faroq | "Kali Terakhir Ku Lihat Wajahmu" (Uji Rashid) | Safe |
| Syamel | "Biarkanlah" (Drama Band) | Safe |
| Aziah | "Terima Kasih Cinta" (Tasha Manshahar & RJ) | Safe |
| Lisa | "Wrecking Ball" (Miley Cyrus) | Safe |

- Best performances: Syameel Aqmal bin Mohammad Fodzly (Syamel)
- Eliminated: No elimination.

=== Week 5 ===
- Aired date: 6 September 2015
- Theme: Film's Soundtrack (OST)
- Guest judges: Afgan

| Student | Song | Film | Result |
|---|---|---|---|
| Faroq | "Bujang Lapok" (P. Ramlee) + "Malam Bulan Di Pagar Bintang" (P. Ramlee) | Bujang Lapok | Safe |
| Aziah | "Teruja" (Ella) + "Generasiku" (OAG) | Gol & Gincu | Eliminated |
| Openg | "Azura" (Jamal Abdillah) + "Setahun Sudah Berlalu" (Alleycats) | Azura | Safe |
| Rachel | "Mamma Mia" (Abba) + "Thank You for The Music" (Abba) | Mamma Mia | Safe |
| Sharul | "Awas" (KRU) + "Negatif" (KRU) | Awas | Safe |
| Lisa | "Patah Seribu" (Shila Amzah) + "Aku Datang" (Tomok) | Istanbul Aku Datang | Safe |
| Syamel | "Di Ambang Wati" (Wings) + "Ukiran Jiwa" (Awie) | Sembilu | Safe |
| Bila | "When You Wish Upon a Star" (Linda Ronstadt) + "Reflection" (Lea Salonga) + "Kau Dihatiku (Zainal Abidin) | Pinocchio + Mulan + Tarzan | Safe |
| Iqwan | "Ada Apa Dengan Cinta" (Melly Goeslaw & Eric) + "Tentang Seseorang" (Anda) | Ada Apa Dengan Cinta? | Safe |
| Sufi | "Salam Terakhir" (Sudirman) + "Idola" (Azlan & The Typewriter) | Hoore! Hoore! | Safe |

- Best performances: Syameel Aqmal bin Mohammad Fodzly (Syamel)
- Eliminated: Aziah binti Awang (Aziah)

=== Week 6 ===
- Aired date: 13 September 2015
- Theme: Rock
- Guest judges: Ella & Awie

| Student | Song | Result |
|---|---|---|
| Faroq | "Cinta Dewa Dewi" (Spider) | Eliminated |
| Openg | "You Give Love a Bad Name" (Bon Jovi) | Eliminated |
| Sharul | "Patahnya Sayap Malam" (Massa) | Safe |
| Lisa | "Kitalah Bintang" (Ella) | Safe |
| Rachel | "Teman" (XPDC) | Safe |
| Syamel | "Rahasia Perempuan" (Ari Lasso) | Safe |
| Sufi | "Mentari Di Ufuk Timur" (Search) | Safe |
| Iqwan | "Suratan Takdir" (Gersang) | Safe |
| Bila | "Semalam Yang Hangat" (Wings) | Safe |

- Best performances: Ang Hui San (Rachel)
- Eliminated: Anthonasius Jadil (Openg) & Muhammad Amyroulfarouk bin Mohammad Nor (Faroq)

=== Week 7 ===
- Aired date: 20 September 2015
- Theme: Icon
- Guest judges: Dato' AC Mizal

| Student | Song | Result |
|---|---|---|
| Sharul | "Bukan Cinta Biasa" (Dato' Siti Nurhaliza) | Safe |
| Rachel | "Apa Khabar Orang Kampung" (Dato' Sudirman Arshad) | Safe |
| Sufi | "Akhirnya Kini Pasti" (Anita Sarawak) | Safe |
| Bila | "Seribu Bintang" (Alleycats) | Safe |
| Iqwan | "Sinaran" (Datuk Sheila Majid) | Eliminated |
| Syamel | "Sepi Sekuntum Mawar Merah" (Ella) | Safe |
| Lisa | "Kau Lupa Janji" (Jamal Abdillah) | Safe |

- Best performances: Syameel Aqmal bin Mohammad Fodzly (Syamel)
- Eliminated: Muhammad Ikhwan Alif bin Salim (Iqwan)

=== Week 8 ===
- Aired date: 27 September 2015
- Theme: Media & Viewers Choice
- Guest judges: Ogy Dato' Ahmad Daud

Solo

| Student | Song | Result |
|---|---|---|
| Sufi | "Berdendang Dalam Tangisan" (Jamal Abdillah) | Safe |
| Lisa | "Aku Tak Akan Bersuara" (Nike Ardilla) | Safe |
| Sharul | "Bila Tiba" (Ungu) | Safe |
| Bila | "Semoga Abadi" (Misha Omar) | Safe |
| Syamel | "Mimpi yang Tak Sudah" (Ibnor Riza) | AF Immunity |
| Rachel | "Teratai Layu Di Tasik Madu" (Fauziah Latiff) | Safe |

Duet

| Student | Song |
|---|---|
| Sharul & Bila | "Like I'm Gonna Lose You" (Meghan Trainor & John Legend) |
| Lisa & Rachel | "Let It Go" (Idina Menzel) |
| Sufi & Syamel | "Seruan" (Lefthanded) |

- Best performances: Sharul & Bila (Duet)
- Eliminated: Syameel Aqmal bin Mohammad Fodzly (Syamel)
- AF Immunity: Syameel Aqmal bin Mohammad Fodzly (Syamel)

Syamel originally eliminated but later Ramli M.S using a 'veto' immunity to save him from the elimination.

=== Week 9 (Semifinal) ===
- Aired date: 4 October 2015
- Theme: World & Duet
- Guest judges: Dato' AC Mizal & Ogy Dato' Ahmad Daud

Solo

| Student | Song | Result |
|---|---|---|
| Rachel | "Hi Hi Bye Bye" (Cyndi Wang) | Eliminated |
| Sharul | "Gadis Jolobu" (Waris & Dato' Hattan) | Safe |
| Lisa | "Masih Cinta" (Kotak) | Eliminated |
| Sufi | "Untukmu Ibu" (Exists) | Safe |
| Syamel | "Cinta Yang Sempurna" (Qanda) | Safe |
| Bila | "Girl On Fire" (Alicia Keys) | Safe |

Duet

| Student | Guest singer | Song |
|---|---|---|
| Rachel | Azhael | "Hati Ini Telah Dilukai" (Krisdayanti & Ajai) |
| Sharul | Nurul Wahab | "Tak Kenal Maka Tak Cinta" (Francissca Peter & Roystan Maria) |
| Lisa | Forteen | "One Sweet Day" (Mariah Carey & Boyz II Men) |
| Sufi | Aisyah Aziz | "Seluruh Cinta" (Cakra Khan & Dato' Siti Nurhaliza) |
| Syamel | Aizat Amdan | "In Love With You" (Aizat Amdan & Noh Salleh) |
| Bila | Bob Yusof | "Pening" (Ezlynn & Dato' M. Daud Kilau) |

- Best performances: -
- Eliminated: Allyssa Joanne Anak Jambi (Lisa) & Ang Hui San (Rachel)

=== Week 10 (Final) ===
- Aired date: 11 October 2015
- Theme: Cover Song & New Single
- Guest judges: Ogy Dato' Ahmad & Dato' AC Mizal

| Student | Song | Result |
|---|---|---|
| Sharul | "Just The Way You Are" (Bruno Mars) "Hanya Kamu"; Composer: Aiman; Lyric: ZL | Fourth place |
| Syamel | "Hidup Dalam Mati"; Composer: Syamel; Lyric: Syamel "Sampai Mati" (Hazama) | Runner-up |
| Bila | "Karma" (Faizal Tahir) "Diam Saja"; Composer: Edry Abdul Halim; Lyric: Edry Abdul Halim | Third place |
| Sufi | "Kisah Dua Muka"; Composer: Sufi; Lyric: Sufi "Andaiku Bercinta Lagi" (Mojo) | Champion |

- Champion: Mohammad Sufie bin Rashid (Sufi)
- Runner-up: Syameel Aqmal bin Mohammad Fodzly (Syamel)
- Third place: Nurajmi Nabila binti Samsaidi (Bila)
- Fourth place: Muhammad Shahrul Amin bin Kamarozzaman (Sharul)

== Elimination chart ==
| Rank | Weekly Concerts | | | | | | | | | | |
| Rank | Students | 1 (9/Aug) | 2 (16/Aug) | 3 (23/Aug) | 4 (30/Aug) | 5 (6/Sep) | 6 (13/Sep) | 7 (20/Sep) | 8 (27/Sep) | 9 (4/Oct) | Final (11/Oct) |
|---|---|---|---|---|---|---|---|---|---|---|---|
| 1. | Sufi | Safe | Safe | Safe | Safe | Safe | Safe | Safe | Safe | Safe | 1st |
| 2. | Syamel | Safe | Safe | Safe | Safe | Safe | Safe | Safe | Saved | Safe | 2nd |
| 3. | Bila | Safe | Safe | Safe | Saved | Safe | Safe | Safe | Safe | Safe | 3rd |
| 4. | Sharul | Safe | Safe | Safe | Safe | Safe | Safe | Safe | Safe | Safe | 4th |
| 5. | Lisa | Safe | Safe | Safe | Safe | Safe | Safe | Safe | Safe | Elim | |
| 6. | Rachel | Safe | Safe | Safe | Safe | Safe | Safe | Safe | Safe | Elim | |
| 7. | Iqwan | Safe | Safe | Safe | Safe | Safe | Safe | Elim | | | |
| 8. | Openg | Safe | Safe | Safe | Safe | Safe | Elim | | | | |
| 9. | Faroq | Safe | Safe | Safe | Safe | Safe | Elim | | | | |
| 10. | Aziah | Safe | Safe | Safe | Safe | Elim | | | | | |
| 11. | Ziqa | Safe | Safe | Elim | | | | | | | |
| 12. | Ifa | Safe | Elim | | | | | | | | |

== Cast members ==
=== Hosts ===
- Zizan Razak - Host of concert Akademi Fantasia
- Faizal Ismail - Host of concert Akademi Fantasia
- Nana Mahazan - Host of Diari Akademi Fantasia

=== Professional trainers ===
- Edry Abdul Halim - Principal
- Shahrol - Vocal Presentation
- Linda Jasmine - Choreographer
- Fatimah Abu Bakar - English Language Consultant & Counsellor
- Fauziah Nawi & Que Haidar - Drama & Acting
- Acis - Music Director

=== Judges ===
- Dato' Ramli M.S
- Rozita Che Wan

=== Champion Judges ===
- Stacy
- Joe Flizzow

== Season statistics ==
- Total number of students: 12
- Oldest student: Suili George, 28 years old
- Youngest students: Walfadhilah Suhaizat & Muhammad Fareezuan Adnan, 19 years old
