= Malang Si Puteri =

2024 Malaysian television series

- Promotional poster for "Malang Si Puteri"
- Genre: Revenge; Melodrama; Romantic thriller
- Created by: Shahrulezad Mohameddin
- Directed by: Uchee Fukada
- Starring: Fasha Sandha; Hafreez Adam; Malek Mccrone; Wan Raja; Aidit Noh
- Opening theme: Cinta Tak Mungkin - Dato’ Siti Nurhaliza
- Composer: Farouk Roman
- Country of origin: Malaysia
- Original language: Malay
- No. of episodes: 50 (list of episodes)

Production
- Executive producer: Hisham A Karim
- Producers: Shahrulezad Mohameddin; Fazli Hj Baharom
- Running time: 42-45 minutes
- Production company: Radius One

Original release
- Network: Astro Ria

Malang Si Puteri (English: The Sorrow of Puteri) is a 2024 Malaysian television drama series created by Shahrulezad Mohameddin, directed by Uchee Fukada, starring Fasha Sandha, Hafreez Adam, Malek Mccrone, Wan Raja and Aidit Noh. It premiered on Astro Ria on March 11, 2024, and airs every Monday to Friday at 18:00 (MST).

== Synopsis ==
Malang Si Puteri tells about the misfortune of Puteri (Fasha Sandha), a woman who was unlucky in her pursuit of love until she had to go through an incident in her life that led to prison which if her guilt was successfully proven by the prosecutor Puteri would be hanged at the end. A lawyer appeared pro bono trying to save him. At there the Puteri began to tell the unfortunate story of her life why she was finally imprisoned in the final room.

== Cast ==
=== Main ===
- Fasha Sandha as Puteri Raissa
- Hafreez Adam as Sulaiman
- Malek Mccrone as Johan
- Wan Raja as Arman
- Aidit Noh as Fatah

=== Special appearance ===
- Fahrin Ahmad as Zaki
- Azhar Sulaiman as Mokhtar

=== Supporting ===
- Sahronizam Noor as Ayah Leh
- Laila Nasir as Saerah
- Ani Maiyuni as Hanum
- Raja Azura as Cik Odah
- Muaz Fitri as Azlan
- Rasya Dean as Mastura
- Melanie Tan as Maria
- Ziema Din as Norma
- Amylea Azizan as Qalbu
- Zarina Zainoordin as Intan
- Putra Jalil as Tariq
- Elly Arifin as Jojo Eddy
- Elly Suhaili as Kak Yati
- Rian Shain as Basir
- Meema Teh as Baby
- Aunie Zahra as Puteri (10 years old)
- Qaseh Izwandy as Zulaikha (10 years old)
- Jannah Izwandy as Zulaikha (15 years old)

=== Additional ===
- Uchee Fukada
- Nabil Jaffri
- Mohd Saufi (SOPEC)
- Marshahidatul Shahirah
- Ribena Shah
- Khalid Anwar
- Yong Mun Keet
- Shahidan Zainul
- Saiful Owen
- Amri Huzairi
- Faiza Said (EJ Comey)
- Fadde
- Rosesuciali
- Carlos Hulls
- Mirul Hasan
- Ahmad Naqiyuddin
- Laila Izaity Mohamed
- Mat Ikmal
- Khusnulhatima
- Atiqah Izyani
- Ayu Azlina
- Shyrim Husni
- Fhairul Fizzi
- Presana Narayanan
- Eyda Rahman
- Hanisah Ahmad
- Nazimah Nasir
- Fairuz Hadi
- Nurhanis
- Azman Teluk Bakong
- Nuqman Farish
- Farhana Mat Dali
- Sherlisa Lim
- Sulyiana
- Jafruz Aufar
- Mohamed Syafiq
- Amirul Hazlee
- Ridauddin
- Aizul Hafizi
- Sofiahani
- Fitrah Hardiati
- Saharifah Nadira
- Norasikin Abdullah
- Nurlika Ardilah
- Nurul Huda
- Siti Fatimah
- Khairuz Zamani
- Ishah Che Long
- Sofian Ariffin
- Yaakob Md Yusof
- Paizal Bidin
- John Junaidi
- Danny Hazrick
- Farhan Yusoff
- Innuar Shazamirul
- Ashimah Sultan
- Hajjah Atemi
- Rujinah
- Hawani Rasmuni
- Qhairunisha Aqilla
- Anuar Parade
- Khairul Anwar
- Roslina Che In
- Siti Safawati
- Man Jetty Teluk Bakong
- Rayyan Nifaiel
- Zulkeflee
- Izuan Saliman
- Hafiz Jaharudin
- Sidek Suliman
- Ahmad Awang
- Habibah Ismail
- Roslina Abd Hamid
- Zainab Muri
- Zubaidah Atan
- Noraini Semion
- Halimah Harun
- Jamilah Darus
- Norazwan Daud
- Rahiman Idris
- Raja Saadiah
- Zuhariyah Othman
- Syamsul Anwar
- Wan Badhli
- Lau Chuin Ee
- Rahman Teksi
- Ahmad Safri
- Mohd Khairul Anuar
- Alif Haizl
- Fautie Kazline
- Ulfah Aliyah
- Umi Hayati
- Wak Suhadak
- Ahmad Tarmizi
- Asyraf Huzaini
- Muhammad Syaffiq
- Muhammad Farid
- Rizuan Mohd Aris
- Danial Harith
- Nabil Fikri
- Auni Zahra
- Abdul Fattah
- Mohamad Anis
- Mohd Fazril
- Reyza Fenge
- Lanura Essani
- How Heong Yoong
- Jiayee Yoong
- Szejiat
- Erman Ibrahim
- Odean
- Lim Hui Hong
- Zaed Abd Hamid
- Naziha Saleh
- Nurul Nabilah
- Roslina Wati
- Fadzil A. Aziz
- Puteri Ava Khadeeja
- Hakim Ahmad Aisy
- Muhammad Qaayed

== Soundtrack ==
Released on February 23, 2024
No.	Title	Singer	Length
1.	"Jauh"	Adrianna Cinta	3:40
2.	"Dursila"	Meiska	4:06

Released on March 08, 2024
No.	Title	Singer	Length
1.	"Cinta Tak Mungkin"	Dato’ Siti Nurhaliza	3:46
