= Jangan Lupa Lirik! =

Malaysian quiz show

- Genre: Game Show
- Created by: Jeff Apploff
- Presented by: Aznil Nawawi
- Theme music composer: The Doobie Brothers
- Opening theme: "China Grove" by Rickey Minor
- Country of origin: Malaysia
- Original language: Malay
- No. of seasons: 1 (2008), 2 (2009), 3 (2010), Hiatus (2011)

Original release
- Network: Astro Ria

Jangan Lupa Lirik! or JLL! is a Malaysian quiz show format of Don't Forget the Lyrics! with a jackpot of RM 1,000,000. It is currently shown on Astro Ria since April 28, 2008.

== Merdeka Edition ==
The Merdeka edition was produced in 2008 and the proceedings were made for charity. The contestants from the edition were all well-known artists which is:

- Mila (AF5)
- Zahid (AF2)
- Salih Yaakob (Actor, DJ Sinar FM, Presenter)

== Raya Edition ==
The Raya edition was produced in 2009 and proceedings were made for charity. The contestants were also well-known artists which is:

- Siti Nurhaliza (Singer)
- Saiful Apek (Actor, Singer, Presenter)
- Amy Mastura (Actress, Singer, Presenter, Model)
- Adibah Noor (Actress, Singer, Presenter)

== Plot Lyric color ==
- Lyric unfilled and not yet to be locked e.g. = _ _ _ _
- Lyric locked e.g. = Aku Cinta Pada Mu
- Green color which means correct lyric e.g. = Aku Cinta Pada Mu
- Red color which means wrong lyric e.g. = Pada Mu Aku Cinta

== Prizes ==
| Correct song lines | Prize |
|---|---|
| 1 | RM500 |
| 2 | RM1,000 |
| 3 | RM2,000 |
| 4 | RM5,000 |
| 5 | RM10,000 |
| 6 | RM25,000 |
| 7 | RM50,000 |
| 8 | RM100,000 |
| 9 | RM500,000 |
| 10 | RM1,000,000 (Top prize) |

== Record Jangan Lupa Lirik by year ==
| Year | Total of money | Money totaled for special editions |
|---|---|---|
| 2008 | RM 25,000 | RM 50,000 - Merdeka Edition |
| 2009 | RM 100,000 | RM 50,000 - Raya Edition |

== Lifelines Option ==
1. Backup - In the option, the player will choose the either one or two backups to help sing the difficult lyrics.
2. Open 2 lyrics - The player will give his or her chance to open two lyrics to look if the lyrics were correct.
3. Objective - The player will choose the either three objective forms which contains different lyrics.

=== New concept season 2 ===
1. From the first episode of the second season, the player will have one unprofessional singer from either Friend or Family and one professional singer which is the show's guest appearance.

==== Back-up (Celebrity) Season-2 ====
| Episode | Date | Celebrity |
|---|---|---|
| 1 | 17 Mei 2009 | Ebi AF5 |
| 2 | 23 Mei 2009 | Nurul |
| 3 | 24 Mei 2009 | Din Beramboi |
| 4 | 30 Mei 2009 | Farah AF2 |
| 5 | 31 Mei 2009 | Shawal AF5 |
| 6 | 6 Jun 2009 | Stacy AF6 |
| 7 | 7 Jun 2009 | Dafi AF5 |
| 8 | 13 Jun 2009 | Ferhad |
| 9 | 14 Jun 2009 | Awal Ashaari |
| 10 | 20 Jun 2009 | Azrul Cham RL2 |
| 11 | 21 Jun 2009 | Along Cham RL2 |
| 12 | 27 Jun 2009 | Ifa Raziah |
| 13 | 28 Jun 2009 | Haiza |
| 14 | 4 Julai 2009 | Faizal Tahir |
| 15 | 5 Julai 2009 | Ezlynn |
| 16 | 11 Julai 2009 | Jihan RL3 |
| 17 | 12 Julai 2009 | Ani Maiyuni |
| 18 | 19 Julai 2009 | Bell Ngasri |
| 19 | 25 Julai 2009 | Noor Khiriah |
| 20 | 26 Julai 2009 | Abby Abadi |
| 21 | 01 Ogos 2009 | Izwan Pilus |
| 22 | 02 Ogos 2009 | Asheed Def Gab C |
| 23 | 09 Ogos 2009 | Bob KU2 |
| 24 | 15 Ogos 2009 | Tomok |
| 25 | 16 Ogos 2009 | Harun Salim Bachik |

==== Back-up (Celebrity) Season-3 ====
| Episode | Date | Celebrity |
|---|---|---|
| 1 | 23 Mei 2010 | Zainal Alam Kadir |
| 2 | 29 Mei 2010 | Angah RL |
| 3 | 30 Mei 2009 | Azwan Ali |
| 4 | 5 Jun 2010 | Opie Zami |
| 5 | 6 Jun 2010 | Didie Alias |
| 6 | 12 Jun 2010 | Reza Mohamad |
| 7 | 13 Jun 2010 | artist Shila OIAM, contestant (Muhammad fikri bin ahmad) |
| 8 | 19 Jun 2010 | Adam AF2 |
| 9 | 20 Jun 2010 | Isma AF7 |
| 10 | 26 Jun 2010 | Sharifah Shahirah |
| 11 | 27 Jun 2010 | Alif OIAM |
| 12 | 3 Julai 2010 | Aizat AF5 |
| 13 | 4 Jun 2010 | Akim AF7 |
| 14 | 10 Julai 2010 | Shamsul Ghau-Ghau |
| 15 | 11 Julai 2010 | Nadia Mustafa |
| 16 | 17 Julai 2010 | Dina |
| 17 | 18 Julai 2010 | Razlan Kristal |
| 18 | 24 Julai 2010 | April AF7 |
| 19 | 25 Julai 2010 | Alyah |
| 20 | 31 Julai 2010 | Sarah |
| 21 | 1 Ogos 2010 | Atilia |
| 22 | 7 Ogos 2010 | Hazama |
| 23 | 8 Ogos 2010 | Farouk Hussin |
| 24 | 14 Ogos 2010 | Khairil Rashid |
