= Fasha Sandha =

Malaysian actress (born 1984)

Fasha Sandha PJB
- Sandha in 2026
- Born: Nur Fasha Sandha binti Hassan; 28 March 1984 (age 42); Johor Bahru, Johor, Malaysia
- Occupations: Actress, producer, host
- Years active: 2002–present
- Spouses: Toh Muda Dato' Rizal Ashram Ramli (m. 2012; div. 2016) Aidil Aziz (m. 2019)
- Children: 3

Nur Fasha Sandha Hassan was born on 28th March, 1984. She is a Malaysian actress who has appeared in films, television shows, and commercials.

== Life and career ==
She was born in Johor Bahru but later moved to Penang. She then transferred to Kuala Lumpur, and later to Perlis because of her father's work. She was married to Rizal Ashram. They have two children together.

Since graduating from the Kuala Lumpur-based Institut Kebudayaan Negara in 2002, she has appeared in movies Black Maria, Bujang Senang, Gong and Cicak Man. Sandha was named most popular new actress in the 2005 Anugerah Bintang Popular for her performance on television drama Natasya. She won the 2011 Anugerah Bintang Popular for her outstanding acting in Chinta (TV Series), beating the other nominees, Tiz Zaqyah and Lisa Surihani. She is also famous for her best-selling novel, Sumpahan Fasha (Fasha's Curse).

In 2007, she was appointed as the Maybelline ambassador, succeeding Siti Nurhaliza.

== Personal life ==
In 2012, she married businessman Rizal Ashram Ramli. They had a son and a daughter and were divorced in 2016.

She has been married to actor Aidil Aziz since 2019 and has 1 daughter with him.

== Filmography ==
=== Film ===
Year	Title	Role	Notes
2003	Black Maria	Dania	Debut film appearances
2004	Bintang Hati	Jun	
2004	Berlari Ke Langit	Yasmin Suraya	
2004	SH3	Nelly	
2005	Anak Mami Kembali	Fasha	
2006	Bujang Senang	Murni	
2006	Gong	Mira	
2006	Nana Tanjung	Khairunnisa	
2006	Cinta	Azura	
2006	Cicak Man	Tania	
2007	Badai Pasti Berlalu	Siska	Indonesian movie, remake of the 1977 film of the same title directed by Teguh Karya.
2007	9 September	Nia	
2007	Nana Tanjung 2	Khairunnisa	
2007	Anak Halal	Amira Atikah	
2008	Evolusi KL Drift	Fasha	
2008	Cinta U-Turn	Juliana	
2008	Cicak Man 2: Planet Hitam	Tania	
2009	Skrip 7707	Ayu	
2010	4 Madu	Ros	
2011	Sini Ada Hantu	Banana Tree Ghost	
2013	Ops Kossa Dappa 3		Cameo appearance
2016	Anak Mami Nasi Kandaq	Fuziah	
2016	Dukun Dr. Dani	Dr. Lily	
2018	Badang	Tisha	
2018	Blok 404	Suri	
2020	Ada Apa Dengan Dosa	Siti Zahrah	
2020	Aku Bukan Gila	Andra	
2023	Cerana Biduk Bu Merah	Bu Merah	
2024	Anak Perjanjian Syaitan 2	Ustazah Jamilah	

=== Television series ===
Year	Title	Role	TV channel	Notes
2005–2006	Natasha	Natasha	TV3	
2006	Mentari Jingga		Astro Ria	
2008	Impak Maksima The Series	Eva	TV3	
2008	Sutera Maya	Maya Medina	TV3	
2009	Keliwon (Season 1)	Wan Nur	TV3	Episode: "Santau"
2009	Keliwon (Season 1)	Mariam	TV3	Episode: "Anak Belaan"
2009	Keliwon (Season 2)	Nora	TV3	Episode: "Hantu Tak Berkepala"
2009–2010	Cuci-Cuci Services	Zaiton	TV2	
2010	Chinta	Chinta	TV3	
2010	Duyong Aridinata	Cleo	TV3	
2010	Spa Qistina	Frieda	TV3	
2010	Mistik Alam Hitam		Astro Ria & Astro Prima	
2011	Dia Atilia	Atilia	Astro Prima	
2011	Samson & Delaila	Delaila	TV3	
2011	Dewa Cinta		TV3	
2011	Cinta Elysa	Elysa	TV3	
2012	Seindah Sakura	Shakira	TV3	
2014	Miranda	Miranda	TV3	
2014	Tentang Hati (Season 1)	Azia	TV2	
2015	Alif Imani	Mahsuri	TV9	
2016	Tentang Hati (Season 2)	Azia	TV2	
2016	Lara Aishah	Aishah	Astro Prima	
2017	Syurga Yang Kedua	Dr. Vanida / Vivy	Astro Prima	
2019	Patah Sayap Bertongkat Paruh	Aliah	Astro Ria	
2019	Semua Salahku	Sofea	TV3	
2020	Dua Takdir Cinta	Mariana	Astro Prima	
2021	Scammer	Nisa	Astro Ria	
2021	Mamu Mami Gosip	Cempaka	Filem Negara Malaysia	Also as producer
2022	Dendam Seorang Isteri	Amira / Neelisa	Astro Prima	
2022	Khilaf Asmara	Sya Hanim Syarif	TV3	
2022	Rampas Cintaku	Datin Safieya	IQIYI	
2023	Serpihan Sayang	Nadia	TV3	
2023	Diva Seroja	Suzila	TV3	
2024	Malang Si Puteri	Puteri Raissa	Astro Ria	
2024	Khilaf Yang Tertulis	Misha	TV3	

=== Telemovie ===
Year	Title	Role	TV channel
2004	Quran Buruk	Siti Khadijah	Astro Ria
2004	Anak-Anak Ramadhan		TV3
2007	Sangga Saadah	Shima	TV3
2007	Songket Cinta Bertenun Duka		TV3
2010	Rahsia Shaliza	Shaliza	TV3
2010	Perigi Kontang	Zaleha	TV3
2010	Bagaikan Sumayyah	Shamsiah	TV3
2010	Kontrak Cinta	Karmila	TV3
2010	Teh Tarik Kurang Manis	Mimi	Astro Prima
2011	Bakalong Noda	Karina	TV3
2011	Bawaku Ke Syurga	Rozina	TV3
2011	Suci	Suziana	Astro Prima
2011	Ku Petik Dosa	Aina	TV3
2011	Nur Ain	Marina	TV3
2012	Menara Cinta	Sofea	TV3
2013	Cinta Mat Semperit	Kak Lola	TV3
2013	Racun Ibu	Azah	TV3
2014	Baju Raya Yaya	Yaya	TV3
2015	Hidupku, Solatku, Matiku	Lela	Astro Oasis
2016	Dari Kerana Mata	Mona	HyppTV
2017	Kalbu Pun Berzikir	Norlia	Astro Citra
2017	Hanya Tuhan Yang Tahu	Maria	TV3
2018	Qalbu	Salina	TV3
2018	Cucuk Sanggul Seroja	Seroja	Astro Citra
2018	Istana Firdaus	Liza	TV3
2018	Fasiq	Julisa	NTV7
2020	Coklat Chip Spesial	Farah	TV3
2021	Sihir Pemisah	Aryani	Astro Citra
2021	Mencari Siratul Mustaqeem	Emilia	TV3
2023	Anak Tuan	Ana	TV3
2025	Terpadamnya Pelita Syawal	Aisyah	TV3

=== Television ===
Year	Title	Role	TV channel
2008	ALLY	Herself	TV3

=== Stage acting ===
Year	Title	Role	Notes
2005	Bangsawan Tun Fatimah		

== Awards and nominations ==
Year	Award	Category	Outcome
2005	Anugerah Bintang Popular Berita Harian	Most Popular TV Actress	Won
2006	Anugerah Bintang Popular Berita Harian	Most Popular TV Actress	Won
2006	Anugerah Bintang Popular Berita Harian	Most Popular Film Actress	Won
2007	Anugerah Bintang Popular Berita Harian	Most Popular Film Actress	Won
2010	Anugerah Bintang Popular Berita Harian	Most Popular TV Actress	Won
2021	Anugerah MeleTOP Era 2021	Pelakon MeleTOP - Sihir Pemisah (Astro Citra)	Won

Anugerah Bintang Popular Berita Harian 2024

Aktres filem popular

== Honour ==
- Perlis
  - Meritorious Conduct Medal (PJB) (2025)
