= Tamara Bleszynski =

Indonesian actress (born 1974)

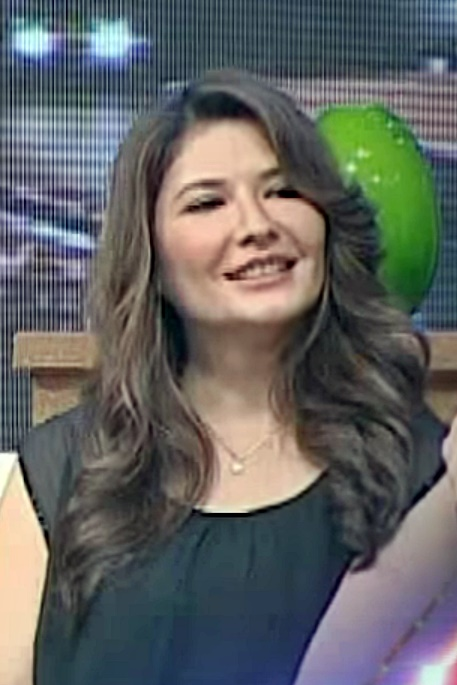
- Bleszynski in 2021
- Born: Tamara Natalia Christina Mayawati Bleszynski; 25 December 1974 (age 51); Bandung, West Java, Indonesia
- Occupations: Model, singer
- Spouses: Teuku Rafly Pasya (m. 1997–2007) Mike Lewis (m. 2010–2012)

Tamara Natalia Christina Mayawati Bleszynski (Polish: Tamara Natalia Krystyna Majawaty Błeszyńska), also known as Tamara Bleszynski (Polish pronunciation: [tamara blɛʂɨɲski]) (born 25 December 1974) is an Indonesian actress, singer, and model. Bleszynski began her career in the soap opera Anakku Terlahir Kembali in RCTI in 1996.

== Early life ==
Tamara Bleszynski was born on 25 December 1974 in Bandung, Indonesia to Zbigniew Błeszyński (d. 28 November 2001), who was of Polish descent, and Farida Gasik, of Sunda descent. Her brothers were Jurek (1956–2004) and Peter (1957–1997), her living brothers are Ryszard (b. 1964) and David, and her sister was Teresa Bleszynski. She completed her education in Indonesia and subsequently in Perth, Australia. She has been interested in acting most of her life. She took extracurricular drama classes in junior high school and continued acting in high school. She obtained a bachelor's degree of Business Management in St Brigid's College Australia, but continued to be interested in acting, so she joined the Theatre Institute.

== Career ==
On return to Indonesia, Tamara Bleszynski was noticed in a record store by Jay Subiyakto, who suggested she should become a model. She got a contract to advertise Lux, a beauty soap.

Tamara Bleszynski began acting in soap operas with her appearance in Anakku Terlahir Kembali (1996) and its sequel, where she appeared with teen idol Desy Ratnasari. Returning to acting after the birth of her child in 2000, she appeared in Doa Membawa Berkah (2000), directed by Ahmad Yusuf. She converted to Islam, and began appearing in religious soap operas. She played in Wah Cantiknya!!! (2001) and Hikmah (2004), for which she won "Favorite Actress" at 2004 and 2005 Panasonic Awards.

Tamara Bleszynski's first appearance in film was in Issue (2004), followed by Big Day (2006). In 2008, Tamara Bleszynski played the action figure Rrama in Cicak Man 2: Planet Hitam and in 2009 worked in the slasher film Air Terjun Pengantin. For this role, she tanned her skin and trained to create an athletic body for the martial arts scenes in her role as Tiara.

Other movies she has appeared in include Opera SMU (2002), Ikhlas (2003), Issue (2004), Putri Cantik (2004), Goal (2005), and Cinta Itu Nggak Buta (2007). She appeared in the television film Dibalik Jendela Astrid (2002). With the Theater Institute, she was cast as Calpurnia, wife of Julius Caesar in Julius Caesar (1997).

== Personal life ==
Tamara Bleszynski converted to Islam in 1995. She married Teuku Rafly Pasha in 1997, and they have one son. They divorced in 2007. She married Mike Lewis in 2010, and they have one son of this interfaith marriage. They divorced in 2012. Tamara Bleszynski continues to work as an actor, model, and brand ambassador, and is part owner in a restaurant, Resto Negev, where she also acted as a chef.

== Discography ==
=== Single ===
| Year | Title | Album |
|---|---|---|
| 2001 | "Berserah Diri" | Ost. Doa Membawa Berkah |
| 2005 | "Doa Berserah" (poetry) | Dari Hati Untuk Aceh |
| 2005 | "Setelah Gempa dan Tsunami" (poetry) | Dari Hati Untuk Aceh |

=== Video clip ===
| Year | Title | Artist |
|---|---|---|
| 1997 | "Aku Disini Untukmu" | Dewa 19 |
| 2000 | "Bila Hati Sedang Lara" | Teresa Bleszynski |
| 2004 | "Khayalan Tingkat Tinggi" | Peterpan |
| 2009 | "Sang Juara" | Maia |

== Filmography ==
=== Film ===
| Year | Title | Role | Notes |
|---|---|---|---|
| 2004 | Issue | Linda | Lead role |
| 2006 | The Big Day | | Lux short movie |
| 2008 | Cicakman 2: Planet Hitam | Rrama | Malaysian film |
| 2009 | Air Terjun Pengantin | Tiara | Lead role |
| 2013 | Air Terjun Pengantin Phuket | Tiara | Lead role |

=== Television ===
| Year | Title | Role | Notes | Network |
|---|---|---|---|---|
| 1996 | Shangrilla | | Supporting role | RCTI |
| 1996 | Anakku Terlahir Kembali | | Supporting role | RCTI |
| 1997 | Perjalanan | | Supporting role | SCTV |
| 1997 | Asmara | | Lila | |
| 2000 | Doa Membawa Berkah | | Lead role | Indosiar |
| 2001 | Doa Membawa Berkah 2 | | Lead role | Indosiar |
| 2001 | Wah Cantiknya | Kartika | Lead role | SCTV |
| 2002 | Wah Cantiknya 2 | Kartika | Lead role | SCTV |
| 2002 | Opera SMU | Sonya | Lead role | RCTI |
| 2003 | Ikhlas | Naia | Lead role | SCTV |
| 2004 | Putri Cantik | Putri Cantik | Lead role | SCTV |
| 2004 | Hikmah | Anna | Lead role | RCTI |
| 2005 | Gol | Maya | Lead role | Indosiar |
| 2005 | Iman | Lela | Episode: "Mayat Penjudi Sukar Dikebumikan" | SCTV |
| 2005 | Hikmah 2 | Anna | Lead role | RCTI |
| 2006 | Hikmah 3 | Anna | Lead role | Indosiar |
| 2006 | Bukan Salah Bunda Mengandung | | Supporting role | RCTI |
| 2007 | Bunga | Intan | Supporting role | SCTV |
| 2007 | Cinta Itu Nggak Buta | Kokom | Lead role | SCTV |
| 2010 | Surga Untukmu | Halimah | Lead role | Indosiar |
| 2011 | Anugerah | Zouya | Supporting role | RCTI |
| 2012 | Mimo Ketemu Poscha | Eva | Supporting role | RCTI |

=== Film Television ===
| Year | Title | Role | Notes |
|---|---|---|---|
| 2002 | Dibalik Jendela Astrid | Astrid | Lead role |
| 2008 | Semua Karena Bu Sonya | Mrs. Sonya | Lead role |
| 2009 | Menantu Untuk Mamaku | | |
| 2009 | Jangan Lari Lagi Diana | | |
| 2009 | Cowok Maunya Apa | | |
| 2010 | Kejar Tayang | | |

== TV commercials ==
- Pond's Age Miracle
- Lux
- Guess (Guess Girl)
- Kia
- Mazda
- Samsung
- Sogo
- Kopi Luwak
- Bio Fibra
- Bank Tamara
- Vaseline
- Visine
- Nivea
- Altex
- Markisa Juice Pohon Pinang
- King Halim Jewellery
- Icon of Glamorous & Elegant Woman for Arantxa Adi Designer
- Duta Baca 2005 Perpustakaan Nasional Republik Indonesia
- Duta Tinju Indonesia
- Ikon Tenun Songket NTT (Tenun Ikat)
- Duta Perdamaian Indonesia-Timor Leste
- Icon of Preview by Itang Yunaz
- Tupperware

== Awards and nominations ==
| Year | Awards | Category | Recipients | Result |
|---|---|---|---|---|
| 1997 | Dewi Magazine | Actress with Beautiful Breast | Tamara Bleszynski | Won |
| 2001 | SCTV Awards | Famous Actress | Doa Membawa Berkah | Nominated |
| 2004 | Panasonic Awards | Favorite Actress | Hikmah | Won |
| 2004 | SCTV Awards | Famous Actress | Hikmah | Nominated |
| 2004 | SWA Magazine | The Best Protagonist Actress | Tamara Bleszynski | Won |
| 2004 | SWA Magazine | The Best Model | Tamara Bleszynski | Won |
| 2004 | Marketing Magazine | Best Actress with Image, Beautiful, Modern, and Intellectual | Tamara Bleszynski | Won |
| 2005 | Panasonic Awards | Favorite Actress | Hikmah | Won |
| 2006 | Panasonic Awards | Favorite Actress | Hikmah 2 | Nominated |
| 2007 | Johnny Andrean Awards | The Best Make Up of Actress | Tamara Bleszynski | Won |
| 2009 | Kapanlagi.com | Undeniable Beauty Icon | Tamara Bleszynski | Won |
| 2012 | Yahoo! OMG Awards | Sexiest Mom | Tamara Bleszynski | Nominated |
| 2012 | Yahoo! OMG Awards | Most Shocking Break Up | Mike Lewis & Tamara Bleszynski | Nominated |
| 2014 | Yahoo! Celebrity Awards | Sexiest Mom | Tamara Bleszynski | Nominated |
