= Zizan Razak =

Malaysian comedian (born 1984)

- زيزان رزاق
- Born: Mohd Razizan bin Abdul Razak; 15 April 1984 (age 42); Dungun, Terengganu, Malaysia
- Other name: Zizan Raja Lawak
- Occupations: Comedian; actor; television personality; rapper; singer; director; producer
- Years active: 2007–present
- Musical career
- Genre: Hip hop

Mohd Razizan bin Abdul Razak (born 15 April 1984), known professionally as Zizan Razak, is a Malaysian comedian, actor, television personality, rapper, singer, director and producer. He has also been a contestant in several reality television shows.

== Early life ==
Zizan was born in Dungun, Terengganu. He is the youngest of two siblings.

== Career ==
He was runner-up (second place) in the first season of Raja Lawak (King of Comedy), a competition for comedians. In it he was known as "Zizan Raja Lawak". He was also a participant in Maharaja Lawak (Emperor of Comedy), which was a second series of competitions for the finalists of each season of Raja Lawak. In the show, he was paired (as a team) with Johan Raja Lawak. They were known as "Jozan". They came first in the series. Zizan also won the reality show Super Spontan Superstar twice.

== Controversy ==
=== Hantu Bonceng film ===
Zizan was asked to apologize for something he said in the comedy Hantu Bonceng in September 2011. It was said to insult Islam. Dewan Pemuda PAS Malaysia condemned what they saw as a clear insult to Allah. They referred to Zizan saying "Ashaduanna Muhammadar...syaitan", which means "I bear witness that Muhammad is ... the devil". Ustaz Azhar Idrus, an Islamic leader in Terengganu, also asked Zizan to repent to Allah.

== Filmography ==
=== Film ===
Year	Title	Role	Notes
2009	Duhai Si Pari-Pari	Penyamun	Debut film appearances
2010	Lu Pikirlah Sendiri De Movie	Zizan	
2010	Kapoww!	Atoi	
2011	KL Gangster	Abang Long Fadil	
2011	Hantu Bonceng	Amran	
2012	Cinta Kura Kura	Nico (voice)	
2012	Jangan Pandang-Pandang	Ajis	
2012	Uncle Usin	Spy 13	
2012	Jalan Kembali: Bohsia 2	Ejan	
2012	Mael Lambong	Mael Lambong	
2012	Baik Giler	Afiq	
2012	Hantu Kapcai	Ajib	
2012	Untuk Tiga Hari	Remy	
2013	KL Gangster 2	Abang Long Fadil	
2013	KL Zombi	Nipis	
2013	Tokan	Mat Lobe	
2013	Bikers Kental	Bidin Al-Zaifa	
2014	Abang Long Fadil	Abang Long Fadil	
2015	Werewolf Dari Bangladesh	Pilun	
2015	Cicak Man 3	Aiman/Cicak Man	
2015	Polis Evo	Hassani / Inspector Sani	
2015	Rembat	MR Baby	
2017	Abang Long Fadil 2	Abang Long Fadil	
2018	Wheely	Wheely	Voice
2018	Kesempatan Keduda	Ken	Indonesia movie
2018	Polis Evo 2	Hassani / Inspector Sani	
2019	Bikers Kental 2	Bidin Al-Zaifa	
2019	Wira	Arson Thug 1	
2020	Bulan dan Pria Terhebat	Haris	
2021	Hantu Bonceng 2.0	Amran	
2021	Rumah Madu Ku Berhantu	Saufi	
2022	Rompak	Ashraf	
2022	Juang	Hafiq	
2022	Abang Long Fadil 3	Abang Long Fadil & Jefri	
2023	Polis Evo 3	Hassani / Inspector Sani	Also as co-executive producer
2023	Merewang Keluarga Pak Awang	Dol	
2024	Baik Punya Ah Long	Aloy	
2025	Redemption		
2026	Terbang	Imran	Post-production

=== Television ===
Year	Title	Role	TV channel
2008–2009	Bolos	Host	Astro Ria
2009–2011	Jozan Show	Host with Johan	Astro Prima
2009	Funniest Pets & People	Host	Astro Ceria
2010–2014	Melodi	Host with Dira Abu Zahar (2010-2012); Awal Ashaari (2012-2017)	TV3
2011	Zizan Show	Host	Astro Warna
2011	Konsert Lawak	Guest host with Johan	Astro Warna
2011	Ketuk Ketuk Ramadhan 2011	Guest	TV1
2013	Akademi Fantasia 2013	Host with Hefny Sahad & Hanis Zalikha	Astro Ria
2014	Jejak Jepun	Host	Astro Ria
2014	Akademi Fantasia 2014	Host with Faizal Ismail & Jihan Muse	Astro Ria
2015	Akademi Fantasia 2015	Host with Faizal Ismail & Nana Mahazan	Astro Ria
2015	Anugerah Industri Muzik ke-21	Host with Faizal Ismail	Astro Ria
2015	Ketuk Ketuk Ramadhan 2015	Guest	TV1
2016	Akademi Fantasia 2016	Host with Alif Satar	Astro Ria
2017	Anugerah Bintang Popular Berita Harian	Host	TV3
2017	Festival Filem Malaysia Ke-29	Host with Siti Elizad	Astro Ria
2020	Stage 104	Host	Astro Ria
2020–2022	The Masked Singer Malaysia	Jury	Astro Warna
2022	MeleTOP	Guest host	Astro Ria
2023	Mega Spontan	Mentor	Astro Warna

=== Reality shows ===
Year	Title	TV channel
2007	Raja Lawak Astro	Astro Ria
2010	Spontan	Astro Warna
2009–2010	Redah Kasi Pecah	Astro Warna
2010	Jangan Lupa Lirik: Raya Raya Raya!!	Astro Ria
2010	Anda Ada 60 Saat	Astro Warna
2011	Maharaja Lawak	Astro Warna
2011	Mega Raya	Astro Ria
2012	Super Spontan	Astro Warna
2012	Clever! Edisi Malaysia	Astro TVIQ
2012	Maharaja Lawak Mega 2012	Astro Warna
2012	Lawak Ke Der?	Astro Warna
2013	Lawak Ke Der? 2	Astro Warna
2014	Maharaja Lawak Mega 2014	Astro Warna
2017	Lawak Ke Der Tak Cover Line EP01	Astro Warna

=== Television series ===
Year	Title	Role	TV channel
2008	Gaia (Season 1)	Gaia	Astro Ria
2008	Gaia (Season 2)	Gaia	Astro Ria
2010	Chapalrela	Anjang Merah	Astro Warna
2022	AI.5YA	Jehan	Viu
2023	Super Wira	Awang Bunga	Astro Ceria
TBA	Kau Takdirkan Bersama	Tengku Luqman	TV3

=== Telemovie ===
Year	Title	Role	TV channel	Notes
2008	Gaia The Movie	Gaia	Astro Ria	First telefilm
2008	Joe & Farida	Amir	Astro Ria	
2009	Geng Raya Zizan	Zizan	Astro Ria	
2010	Nak Balik Raya		Astro Prima	
2010	Odisi Raya MJ		Astro Prima	
2010	Drogba & Rooney	Rooney	Astro Prima	
2011	Cintaku 120KM/J	Rahmat	TV3	
2012	Usin Bunga		Astro Prima	
2013	Karlos Bolos	Hassani	TV3	
2013	Nama Aku Beng	Beng	Astro Ria	
2013	Oh My English!: Oh My Ganu!	Zizang	Astro TVIQ	
2014	Hantu Selfie	Saleh	Astro Ria	
2015	Hantu Wefie	Saleh	Astro Ria	
2015	Strawberi & Karipap Hello Gold Coast		Astro First Exclusive	
2016	Oh My English!: Oh My Ganu! 2	Zizang	Astro TVIQ	
2016	Angin Cinta	KK	Astro First Exclusive	
2017	Jula Juli Bintang Cinta	Dani	Astro Mustika HD	
2017	Jula Juli Bintang Putus Cinta	Dani	Astro Mustika HD	
2017	Baby Bro	Sham	Astro First Exclusive	
2018	Misteri Maria	Ilham	NTV7	
2019	Saya Jual Ye Bang	Amin	Astro First Exclusive	
2021	Perfect Raya	Iman	Astro Ria	
2021	Lagenda Puteri Bulan		Astro Ceria	
2022	Damak Si Kuba	Pok Chek	Astro Ria	
2022	Kerusi Kecil		TV1	
2023	Raya Sebagai Isteri	Haidar	Astro Ria	
2023	Heist- Dil Fitri	Ibrahim	Astro Ria	As director and producer
2023	Heist- Dil Adha	Ibrahim	Astro Ria	As director and producer
2024	Awak Terlalu Ganu Untuk Saya		Astro Ria	As director and producer

=== Music videos ===
Year	Song title	Artist
2012	"Aku Maafkan Kamu"	Malique feat Jamal Abdillah

== Discography ==
Single
Year	Title	Featuring with	Ref.
2012	"Selamat Tinggal"	Dina Nadzir	
2013	"Anggun"	Altimet & Zain Hamid	
2013	"Bawaku Pergi"	Kaka Azraff	
2014	"Infiniti Cinta"	Kaka Azraff	
2014	"Adiwiraku"	KRU	
2017	"Chentaku"	SonaOne	
2017	"Kaki Licik"		
2017	"Baby Bro"	Hannah Delisha	
2018	"Kita OK"		
2018	"Kau Takkan Tahu"	Melda Ahmad	
2019	"Berserah"	Ismail Izzani	
2022	"Payung"	Elizabeth Tan	
2025	"Ngam Ngam Ketupat"	Wani Kayrie, Dinda Dania & Miss Alvy	

== Awards and nominations ==
Year	Award	Category	Nominated work	Result
2009	Anugerah Bintang Popular Berita Harian 2008	Most Popular Male Comedy Artist		Nominated
2011	Anugerah Bintang Popular Berita Harian 2009	Most Popular Male Comedy Artist		Nominated
2011	Shout! Awards 2010	Favourite TV Personality Award		Won
2011	Anugerah Bintang Popular Berita Harian 2010	Most Popular Male Comedy Artist		Won
2012	Anugerah Bintang Popular Berita Harian 2011	Most Popular Male TV Host		Won
2012	Shout! Awards 2012	Best On Screen Chemistry Award	Jozan	Won
2012	Shout! Awards 2012	Favourite TV Personality Award		Won
2012	Anugerah Blokbuster	Greatest Hero Award	Hantu Bonceng	Won
2013	Anugerah Bintang Popular Berita Harian 2012	Most Popular Male Comedy Artist		Won
2013	Anugerah Bintang Popular Berita Harian 2012	Most Popular Male TV Host		Nominated
2013	Anugerah Bintang Popular Berita Harian 2012	Most Popular Film Actor		Nominated
2013	Anugerah Bintang Popular Berita Harian 2012	Best On Screen Chemistry Award		Won
2013	Anugerah Bintang Popular Berita Harian 2012	Most Popular Asian Artist		Won
2013	Anugerah Bintang Popular Berita Harian 2012	Most Stylish Male Celebrity		Won
2013	Anugerah Bintang Popular Berita Harian 2012	Influential Artist on Social Media		Won
2013	Shout! Awards 2013	Best On Screen Chemistry Award	Jozan	Won
2013	Shout! Awards 2013	Favourite TV Personality Award		Won
2013	Anugerah Blokbuster 2	Greatest Hero Award	Hantu Kapcai	Won
2013	Anugerah Lawak Warna 2013	Best Male Comedy Actor (Film)		Won
2013	Anugerah Lawak Warna 2013	Most Popular Male Comedy Artist		Nominated
2014	Anugerah MeleTOP Era 2014	Pemenang Artis Top Top MeleTOP		Won
2014	Anugerah MeleTOP Era 2014	Anugerah Khas Meletop Wechat		Won
2014	Anugerah MeleTOP Era 2014	Lagu Meletop	Infiniti Cinta	Nominated
2014	Anugerah MeleTOP Era 2014	Kumpulan/Duo Meletop	Infiniti Cinta	Nominated
2014	Anugerah MeleTOP Era 2014	Bintang Siber Meletop		Won
2014	Anugerah MeleTOP Era 2014	Fesyen Meletop		Won
2014	Anugerah Bintang Popular Berita Harian 2013	Most Popular Film Actor		Nominated
2014	Anugerah Bintang Popular Berita Harian 2013	Most Popular Male Comedy Artist		Nominated
2014	Anugerah Lawak Warna 2014	Best Male Comedy Actor (Film)	Bikers Kental	Nominated
2014	Anugerah Lawak Warna 2014	Most Popular Male Comedy Artist		Nominated
2015	Anugerah MeleTOP Era 2015	Bintang Filem Meletop	Abang Long Fadil	Nominated
2015	Anugerah MeleTOP Era 2015	Artis Lawak Meletop		Nominated
2015	Anugerah MeleTOP Era 2015	Drama TV Meletop	Hantu Selfie	Nominated
2015	Anugerah MeleTOP Era 2015	Pelakon TV Meletop	Hantu Selfie	Nominated
2015	Anugerah MeleTOP Era 2015	Grup/Duo Meletop	Infiniti Cinta	Nominated
2015	Anugerah MeleTOP Era 2015	Hos TV Meletop	Akademi Fantasia 2014	Nominated
2015	Anugerah MeleTOP Era 2015	Bintang Online Meletop		Nominated
2015	Anugerah MeleTOP Era 2015	Fesyen Meletop		Nominated
2015	Anugerah Bintang Popular Berita Harian 2014	Most Popular Male Comedy Artist		Nominated
2015	Anugerah Bintang Popular Berita Harian 2014	Most Popular Film Actor		Nominated
2015	Anugerah Bintang Popular Berita Harian 2014	Most Popular Male TV Host		Nominated
2015	Anugerah Bintang Popular Berita Harian 2014	Most Stylish Male Celebrity		Nominated
2015	Anugerah Lawak Warna 2015	Most Popular Male TV Host		Nominated
2016	Anugerah MeleTOP Era 2016	Bintang Filem MeleTOP	Polis EVO	Won
2016	Anugerah MeleTOP Era 2016	Hos MeleTOP	Akademi Fantasia 2015	Nominated
2016	Anugerah MeleTOP Era 2016	Bintang Online MeleTOP		Nominated
2016	Festival Filem Malaysia ke-28	Best Male Actor	Polis EVO	Nominated
2016	Anugerah Melodi	Personaliti Filem Melodi		Won
2016	Anugerah Melodi	Personaliti Sosial Media		Nominated
2016	Anugerah Melodi	Personaliti Sensasi Melodi		Nominated
2017	Anugerah Bintang Popular BH	Artis Komedi Popular		Won
2018	Anugerah MeleTOP Era 2018	Artis Lawak Meletop	Abang Long Fadil 2	Won
