= Cicak Man =

2006 film by Yusry KRU

- The Cicak Man
- Directed by: Yusry Abdul Halim
- Written by: Meor Shariman
- Produced by: Johan Lucas
- Starring: Saiful Apek; Fasha Sandha; Yusry; Aznil Nawawi; AC Mizal; Adlin Aman Ramlie
- Music by: Edry Abd Halim
- Production company: KRU Films
- Distributed by: KRU Studios
- Release date: 7 December 2006 (Malaysia)
- Running time: 107 minutes
- Country: Malaysia
- Language: Malay
- Budget: MYR1.7 million (US$492,394.80)
- Box office: MYR6.7 million (US$1,940,614.80)

Cicak Man (pronounced [ˈtʃitʃaʔ ˈman], English: Gecko-Man) is a 2006 Malaysian Malay-language superhero film. Directed by KRU member Yusry Abdul Halim, it is the first Malaysian film of this genre, and features almost 40% CGI footage. Comedian Saiful Apek stars the timid protagonist Hairi who obtains his gecko-like powers quite by accident and becomes a shock to his friend, who also tries his best to adjust to his superpowers while living in the fictional city of Metrofulus.The film received mixed review upon its release.

A sequel, Cicak Man 2: Planet Hitam, was released on 11 December 2008 in Malaysia, Singapore and Brunei following the film's success in the Malaysian box-office. The original announced release is in the end of 2007. A third film titled Cicak Man 3 was released on 12 March 2015 in Malaysia with an all new cast, where Zizan Razak took over Saiful's protagonist place instead.

== Plot ==
Hairi Yatim (Saiful Apek), is a man who lives in Metrofulus. While working in the lab, he accidentally drinks coffee that has been contaminated by a virus-infected gecko (Virus 266). He soon finds himself doing the most insane things, such as sticking to walls, making chirping cicak noises and adding bugs to his menu. He turns to his best friend and apartment mate, Danny (Yusry Abdul Halim), and begs him to find the reason behind his strange antics.

Meanwhile, the people of Metrofulus are constantly being infected by new strains of viruses, and the only cure seems to come only from Professor Klon's (Aznil Nawawi) lab. Suspecting something amiss, Hairi and Danny launch their own investigation and discover that Professor Klon is not only the creator of such viruses, but also has a more sinister plan up his sleeve, backed by his business partners, the Ginger Boys (played by Adlin Aman Ramlie and AC Mizal), who first tend to take revenge on Professor Klon's failed experiment on them; making their senses turn abnormal.

Hairi soon makes use of his new-found powers as "Cicakman" when he saves Tania (Fasha Sandha), Professor Klon's secretary from a threatening situation, and also ends up falling for her. However, he finds that his powers are more of a threat to his life, than a gift, and embarks on a mission to bring down Prof. Klon and the Ginger Boys before his time runs out.

== Cast ==
- Saiful Apek as Hairi / Cicak-Man
- Fasha Sandha as Tania
- Yusry KRU as Danny
- Aznil Nawawi as Professor Klon
- Adlin Aman Ramlie as Ginger 1
- AC Mizal as Ginger 2
- Yasmin Hani as Nadia
- Jalaluddin Hassan as Ramlan, President Metrofulus
- M. Rajoli as Minister 1
- Aziz Sattar as Minister 2
- Shaharuddin Thamby as Minister 3
- Arash Mohamad as Minister 4
- Zulkifli Zain as Minister 5
- Helmi Gimmick as Police Officer
- Abon as Security Guard 1
- Prono as Security Guard 2
- Azhar Sulaiman as Ticket Seller
- Rostam as Radio DJ
- Irma Hasmie as Newsreader

== Production ==
The film was shot using Dolby TrueHD, and about 40% of the film was shot in Green Screen. The visual effects team led by the director, Yusry, used CGI technology to fully realise the fictional city of Bandar Metrofulus (which was based on Kuala Lumpur), the protagonist's super-hero movements and various digital sets. Over 90% of the rotoscoping and compositing work were carried out by KRU Films (now known as KRU Studios), who were also behind the musical scores and audio effects.

Of note, Adlin Aman Ramlie and AC Mizal previously worked together on the Puteri Gunung Ledang musical.

== Soundtrack listing ==
1. The Times – Cicakman
2. Spider – Telinga ke Tulang
3. Pretty Ugly – Diari Seorang Lelaki
4. Ezlynn – Menunggumu
5. Aznil Nawawi – Professor Klon
6. Yusry – Jika Ku Tak Bangun Esok Pagi
7. Dr. Kronik – Bukan Ilusi
8. Syuga – Dialah Aku

== Reception ==
=== Box-office ===
Cicak-Man created Malaysian movie history by grossing MYR350,000 with an audience attendance number of 47,116 in its first day. The film eventually gave its production company, KRU Group of Companies, a MYR6.7 million boost due to sales.

=== Critical response ===
While there were people who praised Cicak Man, there were many others who criticised this film greatly. Film critic Mansor Puteh in an interview by Harian Metro said "...the film has no 'soul'. There is no aesthetic values, culture or hidden meaning that allows the audience to think." There were individuals who compared between Cicak Man and Spider-Man, Batman, Superman, and other superhero films from Hollywood, but before it was released to public, the director, Yusry had advised people to not compare Cicak Man with other superhero characters because the budget is "obviously lower" compared to Hollywood productions.
