= Aznil Nawawi =

Malaysian actor, host, director, singer, writer and radio presenter

Yang Berbahagia Datuk Aznil Nawawi PMW JSM
- أذن النواوي
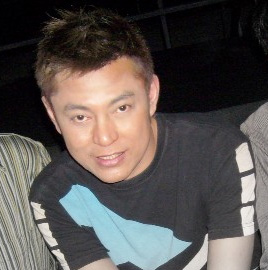
- Born: Aznil bin Nawawi; 6 November 1962 (age 63); Kampung Datuk Keramat, Kuala Lumpur, Federation of Malaya (now Malaysia)
- Other name: Pak Nil
- Education: University of Malaya
- Occupations: Host Television; Director; Actor; Singer; Writer; Radio Presenter
- Years active: 1990–present
- Spouse: Zahauyah Tarmizi (divorced)
- Parents: Haji Nawawi bin Shirin (father); Hajah Norbaiti binti Haji Surur (mother)
- Relatives: Nora Nawawi (sister)
- Awards: Companion of the Gracious Order of the Territorial Crown of Malaysia (JMW) (2009); Media Hiburan 2004 – Special Award; Anugerah Sri Angkasa (2004 & 2005) – Best TV Host; Anugerah Bintang Popular (2003, 2005–2009) – Most Popular Male TV Host; Anugerah Skrin 2007 – Best Talk Show; Anugerah Juri 2008 – Best Entertainment Presenter; Asian Television Awards 2010 – Best Game Show
- Musical career
- Genres: Pop
- Instruments: Vocal
- Years active: 1996–present
- Labels: Pony Canyon; KRU Records

Aznil bin Nawawi (born 6 November 1962), better known as Aznil Nawawi (sometimes he credited as Aznil Haji Nawawi, Aznil or Pak Nil), is a Malaysian TV host, singer and actor.

He won the Best Talk Show Award at the Asian Television Awards 2005 in Singapore. In 2011, he marked 30 years of being involved in the local entertainment scene such as Akademi Fantasia.

== Background ==
Aznil was born in Kampung Datuk Keramat, Kuala Lumpur. He graduated from University of Malaya with a Bachelor of Economics degree. He started his career in 1990 as a broadcaster and a media reporter with TV3. He first started doing news in broadcasting industry, then moved to hosting in 1992. Pop Kuiz was the first program he hosts. In 1994, he hosted Melodi and Teleskop. He then made the move to Astro Ria television channel, which also marked his entry as creative director for the channel. One of his more popular projects is his involvement with the reality programme, Akademi Fantasia.

In May 2007, Aznil said he wouldn't be back to host the highly-popular programme after hosting it for five consecutive seasons. His exclusive contract as a creative consultant with Astro was to expire in September 2007.

== Personal life ==
Aznil has three children, Fildza Haifa whom he calls Fifi, Fariq Haizen whom he nicknames Riki, and a youngest son named Firdaus Hariz called Baby Riz.

On 27 June 2016, his mother Norbaiti Surur died at the Prince Court medical center at the age of 90 due to old age. Aznil confirms the news via WhatsApp. His mother's remains laid to rest at the Keramat Muslim Cemetery, at 10:45 am.

== Honours ==
=== Honours of Malaysia ===
- Malaysia
  - Companion of the Order of Loyalty to the Crown of Malaysia (JSM) (2011)
- Federal Territory (Malaysia)
  - Commander of the Order of the Territorial Crown (PMW) – Datuk (2013)

== Programmes hosted ==
- 1990–1992 – Money Matters (site-reporter)
- 1992–1999 – Pop Kuiz (First programme that he hosted), TV3 with Rina Khan
- 1994 – Melodi with Fauziah Ahmad Daud
- 1995 – Teleskop
- 1999 – Kamera Apo? (What Camera?), NTV7
- 2000–2001 – Ad-Lib, TV2
- 2003–2007 Akademi Fantasia, Astro Ria
- 2003–2004 – Melodi, TV3 (for a year before he signed for an exclusive contract with Astro in October 2004)
- 2005 – Macam Macam Aznil (His own talk show), Astro Prima, formerly Astro Ria
- 2007–2019 – Tom Tom Bak, Astro Ceria
- 2008 – Kring-Kring, Astro Ria
- 2008 – Jangan Lupa Lirik! (Malaysia version of Don't Forget the Lyrics!), Astro Ria
- 2009 – Riuh Pagi, Era FM (daily weekday breakfast show, co-hosted with Din Beramboi until his death)
- 2010 – Riuh Pagi, Era FM (daily weekday breakfast show, co-hosted with Ray and Haniff)
- 2010 – Serasi Bersama, (Malaysia version of Mr & Mrs), Astro Ria with Sharifah Shahira
- 2011 – Akademi Fantasia 9
- 2014 – H! Live, Apa Kata Malaysia (Entertainment news on Astro)
- 2015 – Seiras Seirama Astro Ria
- 2016 – LePaknil
- 2017 – Karok Gram
- 2017 – Ring! Ring! Ringgit!
- 2017 – Go Pak Nil
- 2017 – AF Megastar
- 2019 – Mikrofon Impian
- 2019 – Ketuk-Ketul Ramadan
- 2020–2024 – The Masked Singer Malaysia
- 2021 – Panggung Memori
- 2021–2022 – Hard To Heart
- 2022 – Karaoke Superstar

== Ad hoc programmes hosted ==
- 1993 – Anugerah Juara Lagu ke 8 (Song Champion), TV3 with Fauziah Ahmad Daud and Azwan Ali
- 1996 – Anugerah Skrin (Screen Award), TV3 with Amy Mastura
- 2003 – Anugerah Planet Muzik (Music Planet Award), MediaCorp TV12 Suria and Astro Ria with Sarah Sechan and Najib Ali
- 2003 – Anugerah Juara Lagu ke 18 (Song Champion), TV3 with Sarimah Ibrahim
- 2005 – Anugerah Seri Angkasa, TV1 with Raja Azura
- 2005 – Anugerah Planet Muzik (Music Planet Award), MediaCorp TV12 Suria and Astro Ria with Nirina Zubir
- 2006 – Anugerah Planet Muzik (Music Planet Award), MediaCorp TV12 Suria and Astro Ria with Ady Rahman
- 2007 – Anugerah Era 07

== Filmography ==
=== Film ===
Year	Title	Role	Notes
1995	Sama Tak Serupa	Fariq	
2002	Idola	Himself	Cameo appearance
2004	Aku No. 1	Himself	Also as director and writer
2005	Pontianak Harum Sundal Malam 2	Couple of Boyfriend	Cameo appearance
2006	Cicak Man	Prof. Klon	
2007	Otai	TV Host Programmes Otai	
2008	Cicakman 2: Planet Hitam	Prof. Klon	
2010	Magika	Pak Pandir	
2012	Hoore! Hoore!	Rizal	
2013	Bola Kampung: The Movie	Lord Vilus (voice)	
2015	Ribbit	Mat Rompi (voice)	
2018	Makrifat Cinta	TV Host	

=== Television series ===
Year	Title	Role	TV channel
1995–1996	Sambal	Tok Suek	TV3
2021	Ramadan Pertama Edi	Pak Sobri	Astro Ria

=== Telemovie ===
Year	Title	Role	TV channel	Notes
1997	Si Lembik		TV3	As director
2003	Spyman	Daud	VCD	
2010	Pak Nil... Ibu Kirim Salam	Pak Nil	Astro Prima	Special appearance

== Radiography ==
=== Radio ===
Year	Title	Station
2007 – 1 December 2011	10-1@ERA, Riuh Pagi Era & Carta Era 40	Era
4 March 2024 – present	Pagi On Point Extended	Kool 101

== Discography ==
=== Macam-Macam (1996) ===
First solo album produced by Pony Canyon and released on 31 December 1996, the album consists of 10 songs including a cover song. Jumpa Di Sana is the first single of the album.

==== Track list ====
1. Jumpa Di Sana
2. Tik Tok
3. Malam Minggu
4. Ikrar Anak Malaysia
5. Baby Riki (a song which specially dedicated for his son, Riki)
6. Xanoo
7. Zakia (a 1979 cover song originally performed by Ahmad Albar)
8. Regulasi
9. Kaulah Bintang
10. Dendang Dangdut

=== Aznil (2008) ===
Aznil's mini album was published and released officially on 13 August 2008. The mini album that is entitled "Aznil" consists of three songs composed by Edry Abdul Halim and one cover version. Two of the tracks which are Teramat Sangat and Professor Klon were the original soundtrack for the film Duyung and Cicak Man respectively. Both the films were produced by KRU Films which is now KRU Studios.

==== Track list ====
1. Teramat Sangat (soundtrack for Duyung)
2. Professor Klon (soundtrack for Cicak Man)
3. Jangan Cepat Marah
4. Toyol (cover version of the song in 1979 by Sudirman Hj Arshad)

== Achievements ==
=== 2022 ===
- Special Awards (Anugerah Khas MeleTOP Era 2022)

=== 2015 ===
- Most Popular Male TV Host (Anugerah Bintang Popular 2014)
- Jan 2015 - Representing Malaysia to International Press Junket organized by NBC Universal Los Angeles for E! Channmel. Get to interview Kim Kardashian, Gulliana Rancic, Ryan Seacrest, Christina Milan among others
- Feb 2015 - Representing HBO Asia to The Academy Awards in Los Angeles

=== 2013 ===
- Most Popular Male TV Host (Anugerah Bintang Popular 2011)

=== 2011 ===
- Most Popular Male TV Host (Anugerah Bintang Popular 2010)
- Most Inspirational Host (TV3 Mykids Award

=== 2010 ===
- Best Game Show (Asian Television Awards 2010, Singapore) – Jangan Lupa Lirik!
- Most Popular Male TV Host (Anugerah Bintang Popular 2009)

=== 2009 ===
- Most Popular Male TV Host (Anugerah Bintang Popular 2008)
- Companion of the Gracious Order of Territorial Crown of Malaysia (JMW)

=== 2008 ===
- Best Entertainment Presenter (Anugerah Juri 2008)
- Most Popular Male TV Host (Anugerah Bintang Popular 2007)

=== 2007 ===
- Best Talk Show (Anugerah Skrin 2007) – Macam Macam Aznil
- Most Popular Male TV Host (Anugerah Bintang Popular 2006)

=== 2006 ===
- Most Popular Male TV Host (Anugerah Bintang Popular 2005)

=== 2005 ===
- Most Popular Male TV Host (Anugerah Bintang Popular 2004)
- Best Talk Show (Asian Television Award 2005, Singapore) – Macam Macam Aznil
- Best TV Host (Anugerah Sri Angkasa 2005)

=== 2004 ===
- Best Family Show (Anugerah Sri Angkasa 2004) – Macam Macam Aznil
- Most Popular Male TV Host (Anugerah Bintang Popular 2003)
- Special Award (Media Hiburan 2004)
- Best TV Host (Anugerah Sri Angkasa 2004)

=== 2003 ===
- Most Popular Male TV Host (Anugerah Bintang Popular 2003)

== See also ==
- Astro Ria
- Akademi Fantasia
- Cicak Man
