= Cicak Man 2: Planet Hitam =

2008 film by Yusry KRU

- Directed by: Yusry KRU
- Written by: Yusry KRU; Meor Shariman
- Screenplay by: Yusry KRU
- Produced by: Norman Abdul Halim; Yusry Abdul Halim; Edry Abdul Halim; Ahmad Puad Onah
- Starring: Saiful Apek; Fasha Sandha; Aznil Nawawi; Tamara Bleszynski; Adlin Aman Ramlie; AC Mizal; Sharifah Amani
- Production companies: KRU Studios; Grand Brilliance Sdn Bhd (Malaysia and Brunei)
- Distributed by: Cathay-Keris Films Pte Ltd (Singapore)
- Release date: 11 December 2008
- Running time: 107 minutes
- Country: Malaysia
- Language: Malay
- Budget: MYR 2.5 million
- Box office: MYR 2.85 million

Cicak Man 2: Planet Hitam (English: Geckoman 2: Black Planet) is a Malaysian Malay-language superhero film sequel of Cicak Man, released on 11 December 2008 by KRU Studios in collaboration with Grand Brilliance Sdn. Bhd. in Malaysia, Singapore and Brunei

Still directed by Yusry Abdul Halim with script by the director and Meor Shariman, this action-comedy saw the return of the cast from the first movie and new characters were introduced.

== Plot ==
The evil Professor Klon (Aznil Nawawi) is back after his previous defeat. This time, not only to overthrow the government and becomes the President of Metrofulus, but also to control the world's supply of fresh water through his ingenious plan: "Black Planet". When our blue planet has only 72 hours before turning black, Cicakman (Saiful Apek) comes to the rescue.

But much to his surprise as he face his old enemies: Ginger Boys, which has defeated by Cicakman, now return even more powerful into a spiritual form as Ginger Ghosts (Adlin Aman Ramlie & AC Mizal). In addition, he is now faced with Professor Klon's hired killer: Rrama (Tamara Bleszynski), a young lethal assassin who derives pleasure in killing as if it were a pure art form. As the situation starts taking a downward spiral, even a super hero needs help. But the help appears in the most unexpected forms, including Danny (Yusry Abd Halim) his demised best friend, a powerful feng shui master, Miss Chee (Louisa Chong) and an unlikely party.

Apart from his heavy responsibilities to save the world, he also has his own personal dilemmas to address; that is Hairi vs Cicakman. He has to resolve his personal feelings towards Tania (Fasha Sandha), who is seeking the true identity of Cicakman and he also has to choose whether to sacrifice his own life or save Iman (Sharifah Amani), Danny's blind sister.

== Production ==
The role as Rrama was offered to Erra Fazira, which is Yusry KRU's ex-wife, for the Cicak Man 2 sequel. But, she has rejected due to work and her scheduling conflict. The role was later given to popular Indonesian actress, Tamara Bleszynski, to play as one of the main antagonists for the sequel.

The shooting that took place in Penang, Gua Tempurung, Kampar, Universiti Teknologi Petronas, and Kuala Lumpur costs 2.5 million Ringgit. The costume used in the sequel is higher in quality than the prequel as well as the price cost MYR50 thousand per set while in the prequel the costume used costs only MYR20 thousand per set.

== Cast ==
- Saiful Apek as Cicak-Man/Hairi
- Fasha Sandha as Tania
- Aznil Nawawi as Professor Klon
- Tamara Bleszynski as Rrama
- Adlin Aman Ramlie as Ginger Ghost 1
- AC Mizal as Ginger Ghost 2
- Sharifah Amani as Iman
- Louisa Chong as Miss Chee
- Linda Onn as Amarr
- Yusry Abdul Halim as Danny
- Aziz M. Osman as Fulus News boss
- Julia Ziegler as Kindergarten teacher
- Edry Abdul Halim as Robber 1
- Munir Phyne Ballerz as Robber 2
- Ridzuan Hashim as Abu Bakar
- Jalaluddin Hassan as President Ramlan
- Azwan Ali as Neighbour 1
- Dee as Neighbour 2
- Harry Boy as Neighbour 3
- Julie Dahlan as Neighbour 4
- Fahrin Ahmad as Cameraman
- Hafidzuddin Fadzil as Chief fireman
- Nadia Mustafar as Woman at supermarket 1
- Mak Jah as Woman at supermarket 2
- Zack Taipan as Japanese man
- Mamat Khalid as Malay man
- Karam Singh Walia as Karam Singh Walia

== Release ==
The film was first released at the 13th Pusan International Film Festival on 5 October 2008 as world premiere for superheroes in Asia segment. Other two sessions was held on 7 October at the festival. In Malaysia, Singapore and Brunei, the film had been released on 11 December 2008 with the goal by the producer of a million tickets sold compared to 670 thousand tickets sold for Cicak Man. The film is expected to be released in Indonesia in January 2009.

== Soundtrack ==
1. Dafi – Lemah
2. Pianka – Mau Yang Besar
3. Tyco – Planet Hitam
4. Edry – Sumpah Takkan Cari Yang Lain
5. Anita Sarawak – Ular
6. Flava – Berhenti Mencinta
7. Adam – Jika Tak Kerna Kamu
8. Yusry & Melly Goeslaw – Dibius Cinta
