= List of Upin & Ipin characters =

Upin & Ipin is a Malaysian animated television series created by Burhanuddin Md Radzi and his wife, Ainon Ariff and is produced by Les' Copaque Production, based in Shah Alam, Selangor. The series follows Upin and Ipin, a five-year-old twin brothers who is characterised by their abundance of energy, imagination and curiosity about the world. Both twins, who lost their parents while they are still a baby, lived with their older sister, Ros and grandmother, whom they called Opah at the fictional Kampung Durian Runtuh. The titular characters are voiced by Nur Fathiah Diaz for the first three seasons, and from season 4 onwards, both twins are voiced by Asyiela Putri, while supporting and additional characters are voiced by the series' production staffs and are referred by their first names. This is a list of characters that is first appeared in Upin & Ipin. Characters that was first appeared in Geng: The Adventure Begins, but did not appeared in Upin & Ipin, are not listed.

== Main characters ==
=== Upin and Ipin ===
Upin and Ipin
- Upin & Ipin character
- First appearance: "Esok Puasa" (2007)
- Voiced by: Nur Fathiah Diaz (season 1–3); Asyiela Putri (season 4–present)

In-universe information
- Full name: Aruffin bin Abdul Salam; Ariffin bin Abdul Salam
- Gender: Male
- Family: Opah (grandmother); Kak Ros (sister)
- Home: Kampung Durian Runtuh
- Nationality: Malaysian

Upin and Ipin (real name Aruffin and Ariffin bin Abdul Salam) are five-year-old twin brothers who live in a house in Kampung Durian Runtuh with their older sister, Kak Ros, and grandmother, Opah. They had become orphans, as their parents died during their infancy. Upin was born 5 minutes earlier than Ipin, and therefore, he takes his role as Ipin's older brother seriously. Upin is smarter in computers and is a little scientist at home. Ipin is cuter and funnier than Upin and likes to eat fried chicken. Ipin also tends to often repeat one word three times in one sentence, especially "Betul, betul, betul!". The twin brothers always act spoiled towards Opah, and like to tease their sister. Upin and Ipin attended Tadika Mesra.

Upin and Ipin is depicted as a baby in "Mimpi Terindah" and as an adult in "Upin & Ipin Dah Besar?". In the latter and "Tumbuh Rambut", both of the twins seems to have their hair grown up. The twin brothers imagined themselves as a clock in "Aku Sebuah Jam", as a pencil in "Aku Sebatang Pensel", as a book in "Aku Sebuah Buku" and as a car in "Aku Sebuah Kereta". The twin brothers also imagined themselves as a marine life in "Teroka Lautan" and as a cactus in "Tanya Sama Pokok". They are voiced by Nur Fathiah Diaz from seasons 1 to 3 and Asyiela Putri from season 4 onwards.

To distinguish the twin brothers, Upin has a spiral-shaped hair (his hair style resembles Laa Laa's antenna in Teletubbies) on his head and always wears a yellow tank top with the letter U written on it. Meanwhile, Ipin has no hair, also wears a blue tank top with the letter I written on it, and always wears a red cloth around his neck.

=== Kak Ros ===
Kak Ros
- Upin & Ipin character
- First appearance: "Esok Puasa" (2007)
- Voiced by: Noor Ezdiani Ahmad Fawzi (season 1); Ida Shaheera Azhar (season 2–7); Salsabila Sheikh Khalid (season 7); Siti Khairunnisa Mohamad Ruduan (season 8–present)

In-universe information
- Full name: Nur Roselia binti Abdul Salam
- Gender: Female
- Family: Opah (grandmother); Upin and Ipin (brothers)
- Home: Kampung Durian Runtuh
- Nationality: Malaysian

Kak Ros or simply Ros (real name Nur Roselia binti Abdul Salam) is the older sister of Upin and Ipin. Although she looks fierce and strict to her twin brothers, Kak Ros is a loving sister, and always plays with or teases her younger brothers. In addition, Kak Ros always teaches Upin and Ipin to be good, noble and thrifty. In the episode "Hari Misteri", Ros once gave a gift of a book entitled Cara Menjadi Adik Yang Baik (How to Be a Good Younger Sibling) to Upin and Ipin.

Ros is depicted as a young girl in "Mimpi Terindah". She had a pen pal from Japan named Hideko in the episode "Sahabat Pena", where Ros received a Japanese-styled postcard from Hideko and tries to make a Japanese food to celebrate Hideko's arrival to Malaysia. In the episode "Jaga dan Hargai Mata", Ros was seen to parodying the Metro-Goldwyn-Mayer logo where she roaring like the lion, implying that she is very fierce like the lion in the Pada Zaman Dahulu comic book, which Upin and Ipin read together. She is voiced by Siti Khairunnisa Mohd Ruduan since season 8.

=== Opah ===
Opah
- Upin & Ipin character
- First appearance: "Esok Puasa" (2007)
- Voiced by: Ainon Ariff (season 1–present)

In-universe information
- Gender: Female
- Family: Ros (granddaughter); Upin and Ipin (grandson)
- Home: Kampung Durian Runtuh
- Nationality: Malaysian

Opah is a grandmother of Ros, Upin and Ipin. She has a wise nature regarding worldly and religious matters. In some episodes, Opah has a talkative nature and sometimes an excessive attitude towards her grandchildren, especially Upin and Ipin. She is also known as Mak Uda, especially by older Kampung Durian Runtuh residents, and is voiced by Ainon Ariff since season 1.

=== Ehsan ===
Ehsan bin Azharuddin is one of Upin and Ipin's close friends and classmates in Tadika Mesra, named after a member of Upin and Ipin's production crew. He is known for his rich upbringing, stout body shape and thick black-rimmed glasses. As a class monitor at Tadika Mesra, he wears a red bow tie with his uniform. Ehsan brushes his teeth five times a day. Like Upin and Ipin, he imagined himself as a clock in "Aku Sebuah Jam", as a pencil in "Aku Sebatang Pensel", as a book in "Aku Sebuah Buku" and as a car in "Aku Sebuah Kereta". He also imagined himself in "Teroka Lautan". He is voiced by Fareez Daniel bin Sharabuddin since season 4.

=== Fizi ===
Muhammad Al-Hafizi is one of Upin and Ipin's friends, and is also close to Ehsan. Fizi always teases Ehsan as "Intan Payung" (a slang term for 'spoiled kid'). Fizi is actually a kind child, especially to his friends, but sometimes he likes to tease or talk carelessly to his friends even if he does not mean it. Like Upin and Ipin, he imagined himself as a clock in "Aku Sebuah Jam", as a pencil in "Aku Sebatang Pensel", as a book in "Aku Sebuah Buku" and as a car in "Aku Sebuah Kereta". He also imagined himself as a marine life in "Teroka Lautan". He is voiced by Rufaidah Mohd Fadzil since season 7.

=== Mail ===
Ismail bin Mail is one of Upin's and Ipin's friends and classmates in Tadika Mesra. He is known for selling items or foods such as fried chicken and he's also known for his tagline, "Dua seringgit". Like Upin and Ipin, he imagined himself as a clock in "Aku Sebuah Jam", as a pencil in "Aku Sebatang Pensel", as a book in "Aku Sebuah Buku" and as a car in "Aku Sebuah Kereta". He also imagined himself as a marine life in "Teroka Lautan". He is voiced by Usayd Uqashah Kamsani since season 12.

=== Mei Mei ===
Mei Mei is a girl of Chinese ethnicity. She has a face that wears big glasses, as she has a vision problem (cross-eyed) caused by reading books too close until late at night. Mei Mei has a 'cute' face and used to have center-parted bangs like Mail, but over time her bangs changed to side-parted. She sits on the same bench as Mail. Mei Mei was born in May and dreams of becoming a teacher. Mei Mei also tends to repeat two words twice in one sentence, especially "Saya Suka, Saya Suka". Like Upin and Ipin, she imagined herself as a clock in "Aku Sebuah Jam", as a pencil in "Aku Sebatang Pensel", as a book in "Aku Sebuah Buku" and as a car in "Aku Sebuah Kereta". She also imagined herself as a marine life in "Teroka Lautan". She is voiced by Tan Ying Sowk since season 3.

=== Jarjit ===
Jarjit Singh is one of is one of Upin and Ipin's friends and classmates at Tadika Mesra. He is of Punjabi descent. Although he is the same age as his other classmates, his voice is deep as if he is an adult. In addition, Jarjit is known for his cleverness in humor and his hobby of making rhymes. Jarjit also tends to often repeat one word twice in one sentence, especially the English sentence "Marvelous! Marvelous!". Jarjit's ambition is to become a journalist. Like Upin and Ipin, he imagined himself as a clock in "Aku Sebuah Jam", as a pencil in "Aku Sebatang Pensel", as a book in "Aku Sebuah Buku" and as a car in "Aku Sebuah Kereta". He also imagined himself as a marine life in "Teroka Lautan". He is voiced by Muhd Hafiz Hassan since season 8.

=== Susanti ===
Susanti is one of Upin and Ipin's friends. She is a girl who comes from a family from Jakarta, Indonesia and moved to Malaysia with her family. She was not used to the chatter of other children in Malaysia at first. She makes her debut in the episode "Berpuasa Bersama Kawan Baru". Susanti loves playing badminton and is a big fan of legendary Indonesian badminton player, Susi Susanti. In addition, she is also friends with Mei Mei and Devi. Like Upin and Ipin, she imagined herself as a clock in "Aku Sebuah Jam", as a pencil in "Aku Sebatang Pensel", as a book in "Aku Sebuah Buku" and as a car in "Aku Sebuah Kereta". She also imagined herself as a marine life in "Teroka Lautan". She is voiced by Khansa Mutiara since season 16.

== Supporting characters ==
=== Tok Dalang ===
Isnin bin Khamis, or Tok Dalang, is a wayang kulit puppeteer who has won shadowplay competitions. Like Opah, Tok Dalang is often asked for help by Upin and Ipin, along with their friends. He also always gives them good advice. Tok Dalang has owned a cluster of rambutan trees for commercial purposes, and a pet rooster named Rembo. Tok Dalang has a son named Tajol (who currently lives outside the city) and also has a grandson, Badrol (the main character from Geng: The Adventure Begins). In the episode "Anak Harimau", Tok Dalang is an ardent fan of the English national football team, while in "Bila Cuti Sekolah", he breeds the stingless bees and produces its products, including honey. He is voiced by series producer Burhanuddin Md Radzi since season 5.

=== Ah Tong ===
Ah Tong is a trader and farmer of Chinese ethnicity with a strong Chinese dialect. He is also a preloved items collector. In the episode "Kenapa Tak Elak?", he struggles to pronounce "homesatay" instead of "homestay" (e.g. "Mahu pergi mana... homesatay ah!" and "Dia mahu pergi itu homesatay"), much to Tok Dalang's frustration, while in the episode "Aku Sebuah Jam", he is a clocksmith and runs a clock shop. He is voiced by Calvin Tony Lokeemin since season 8.

=== Muthu ===
Muthu is a restaurateur of Indian Tamil descent and the father of Rajoo. He has a pet cattle named Sapy and is the only restaurateur in Kampung Durian Runtuh where he owns a food stall which serves Malaysian foods and drinks and other menus. Muthu usually wears a singlet, apron and sarong, and he also tends to repeat frequently spoken sentences, especially A-yo-yo.... Like Ah Tong, he struggles to pronounce "homesatay" instead of "homestay" (e.g. "Mahu pergi homesatay ke?"), much to Tok Dalang's frustration. He is voiced by Hazimin Hamdan since season 7.

=== Salleh ===
Salleh (sometimes called Sally) is Upin and Ipin's neighbour. He had first appeared in Geng: The Adventure Begins as a member of the animal hunters in the forest along with Pak Mail and Singh. He is indeed smart in trading online and is sometimes known as a fierce and envious young man. He always said Amboi!. He is also a library car guard in the episode "Seronoknya Membaca" or, many of the stamps affixed to the Mail's books, one of which is "Don't sell this book!". Salleh has occasionally played the role of a fool, but likes to motivate. The episode "Jari Jemari Salleh" focus on him. He is voiced by Ahmad Soufi Ahmad Zaki since season 10.

=== Rajoo ===
Rajoo s/o Muthu is the son of Muthu and a friend of Upin and Ipin. Previously, he had appeared in Geng: The Adventure Begins. He and his father owns a pet cattle named Sapy and appeared in the episode "Sapy Oh Sapy!" and is also one of Upin and Ipin's friends. He is voiced by Kannan Rajan.

=== Cikgu Jasmin ===
Cikgu Jasmin is one of the teachers of Tadika Mesra. She was first appeared in the episode "Tadika" and plays her role as a kindergarten teacher who has extensive knowledge. She is very dedicated and close to her students, while very kind and patient in teaching her students. In the episode "Terima Kasih Cikgu", which marks Cikgu Jasmin's last appearance in Upin & Ipin, she moved to Kuala Lumpur to pursue her studies at the university, and her role as Tadika Mesra's teacher was replaced by Cikgu Melati. Cikgu Jasmin also appears in flashbacks in the episode "Mencari Idola".

=== Ustaz Hamzah ===
Ustaz Hamzah is an al-Quran reciting teacher who teaches Upin and Ipin and their friends to recite the holy Quran. He had appeared in the episodes "Iqra" and "Rasai Kemenangan".

== Other characters ==
- Grandma Kabayan
- Cikgu Melati
- Cikgu Besar
- Cikgu Tiger
- Ijat
- Dzul
- Devi
- Upin and Ipin's parents
- Azharuddin (Ehsan's father)
- Badrol and Lim
- Abang Roy
- Izham (Mail's brother)
- Cik Bidadari
- Izham & Mail's mother
- Opet
- Rembo

== Notable guests ==
Few celebrity guests made a special/cameo appearances in each Upin & Ipin episodes and portrayed as themselves.

- Ras Adiba Radzi – appeared in Season 5 episode, "Tersentuh Hati"
- Zaleha Ismail – appeared in Season 5 episode, "Ikhlas Dari Hati"
- Mahathir Mohamad and Siti Hasmah – appeared in Season 6 episode, "Terima Kasih Cikgu!"
- Afdlin Shauki – appeared in Season 6 episode, "Raja Buah"
- Aziz Sattar – appeared in Season 6 episode, "Kenangan Mengusik Jiwa"
- Wivina Belmonte – appeared in Season 7 episode, "Boria Suka-Suka"
- Jamali Shadat – appeared in Season 9 episode, "Siapa Atan?"
- Aliff Syukri Kamaruzaman – appeared in Season 11 episode, "Terlajak Laris"
- Chef Wan – appeared in Season 12 episode, "Masak Masak"
- Zurinah Hassan – appeared in Season 12 episode, "Aku Sebuah Buku"
- Alexander Nanta Linggi – appeared in Season 14 episode, "Barang Baik, Barang Kita"
- Lat – appeared in Season 16 episode, "Kartunis Lagenda"
- Rosyam Nor – appeared in Season 17 episode, "Secebis Kenangan Abah"
