= Najwa Latif discography =

- EPs: 1
- Singles: 14
- Music videos: 26
- Promotional singles: 2

This is the discography of Malaysian singer-songwriter Najwa Latif. It consists of an extended play, nine singles (including three as a featured artist), two promotional singles and eighteen music videos (including six as a featured artist).

== Albums ==
=== EPs ===
Title	Album details	Peak chart positions	Sales
Title	Album details	MAS	Sales
Najwa Latif	Released: March 2012; Label: NAR Records; Formats: CD, digital download	—	
"—" denotes releases that did not chart or were not released in that region.

== Singles ==
=== As main artist ===
Year	Title	Peak chart positions	Sales	Album
Year	Title	MAS	Sales	Album
2011	"Cinta Muka Buku"	—		Najwa Latif
2012	"Carta Hati"	—		Najwa Latif
2012	"Kosong"	—		Najwa Latif
2012	"Ada Mu"	—		Non-album single
2013	"I Love You"	—		Najwa Latif
2014	"Hilang"	—		Non-album single
2015	"Satu Hari Nanti"	—		Non-album single
2016	"Biar"	—		Non-album single
2017	"Kamu"	—		Non-album single
2018	"Jauh"	—		Non-album single
2019	"KLIA (Kau Lupa Itu Aku)"	—		Non-album single
2020	"Tak Kisah Pun ft. Akwa Arifin"	—		Non-album single
2020	"Dua ft. Akwa Arifin"	—		Non-album single
2021	"Bertenang"	—		Non-album single
"—" denotes releases that did not chart or were not released in that region.

=== As featured artist ===
Year	Title	Peak chart positions	Sales	Album
Year	Title	MAS	Sales	Album
2012	"Untuk Dia" (SleeQ featuring Najwa Latif)	—		SleeQ (2014)
2013	"Kau Pergi Jua" (iamNEETA featuring Najwa Latif)	—		—
2014	"Kalau Nak Berjaya" (Altimet featuring Najwa Latif)	—		—
"—" denotes releases that did not chart or were not released in that region.

=== Promotional singles ===
Title	Year	Peak chart positions	Album
Title	Year	MAS	Album
"Sahabat" (featuring SleeQ & SyamKamarul)	2012	—	Najwa Latif
"I Love You"	2013	—	Najwa Latif
"—" denotes a recording that did not chart or was not released in that territory.

== Other appearances ==
Year	Title	Notes
2012	"Terima Kasih Cikgu" (Najwa Latif featuring Upin & Ipin)	
2013	"Hari Raya" (featuring iamNEETA, Najwa Latif, Deanna Hussin & Mimie Haris)	A tribute song for Muslim's Ramadhan month. Features artists signed to NAR Records. Music and lyrics by Patrick Anohada.
2016	"Ceria Raya" (featuring Mark Adam, Najwa Latiff & Ceria Popstar)	A tribute song for Muslim's Eid celebration. Features contestant from kids singing competition Ceria Popstar and also one of their mentor Mark Adam.
2016	"Sisters Forever" (featuring Lizz Chloe, Najwa Latif, Daiyan Trisha and Jestinna Kuan)	Sunsilk brand song anthem for their new design product.

== Music videos ==
Year	Title	Other artist (s)	Director(s)	Ref.
2011	"Cinta Muka Buku"	None	Irwan Idris	
2012	"Carta Hati"	None	Khaidir Shahri, Zalhilman Ismail & Zalhilmy Ismail	
2012	"Kosong"	None	Zalhilman Ismail	
2012	"Untuk Dia" ^{1}	Sleeq	Aaron Aziz & Irwan Rauf	
2012	"Ada Mu"	None	Khaidir Shahri	
2012	Sahabat	Sleeq & Syamkamarul	Zalhilman Ismail	
2013	I Love You	None	?	
2013	Hari Raya ^{1}	iamNEETA, Deanna Hussin & Mimie Haris	Aidil Dulbahri	
2013	Kau Pergi Jua ^{1}	iamNEETA	Khaidir Shahri	
2014	Hilang	None	Khaidir Shahri	
2014	Hilang (official lyric video)	None	Azlan Shah Anuar	
2014	Kalau Nak Berjaya ^{1}	Altimet	?	
2014	"Ada Mu" (official lyric video)	None	?	
2014	"Hari Raya" (official lyric video)^{1}	iamNEETA, Deanna Hussin & Mimie Haris	Aidil Dulbahri	
2014	"I Love You" (official lyric video)	None	Putera Qamarul (PQ Studio)	
2014	Aku (official lyric video)	None	Aidil Dulbahri	
2014	Aku (official music video)	None	Khaidir Shahri	
2014	Kau Pergi Jua (official lyric video)^{1}	iamNEETA	Aidil Dulbahri	
2015	"Satu Hari Nanti"	None	Rizal Omar	
2015	"Satu Hari Nanti" (official lyric video)	None	Aidil Dulbahri	
2016	"BIAR"	None	Rizal Omar	
2016	"Ceria Raya"	Mark Adam & Ceria Popstar	Izuan Mokhtar	
2016	"Sisters Forever"	Lizz Chloe, Daiyan Trisha and Jestinna Kuan	Izuan Mokhtar	
2017	"KAMU "	None	Rizal Omar	
2018	"Jauh"	None	Joe Zakaria	
2019	"KLIA"	None	Rifaiee Omar	
2020	"Tak Kisah Pun"	Akwa Arifin	Akwa Arifin	

^{1}As featured artist.

- This list does not include music video teasers, behind-the-scenes or the-making-of music videos, live acoustic sessions and live performances.
