= Upin & Ipin =

Malaysian animated series and franchise

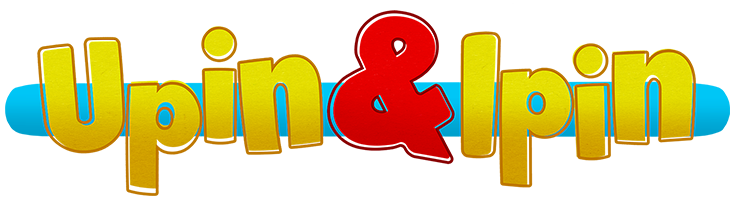
- Current logo, used since 2018.
- Genre: Comedy; Adventure
- Created by: Hj. Burhanuddin Md Radzi; Hjh. Ainon Ariff
- Written by: Ida Shaheera Azhar; Aliya Nazlan; Anira Haris; Megat Zahrin; Nor Fadlita Ayu; Nur Naquyah Burhanuddin; Nor Aizan Embong; Ziera Azreena; Izham Isnan; Rezzuhawa Razali; Nur Shahilla Jesni
- Directed by: Nizam Razak (season 1–3); Usamah Zaid Yasin (Note: Usamah Zaid was credited as assistant director for seasons 1–3.) (season 4); Mohd Nazmi Mohd Yatim (season 5); Mohd Faiz Hanafiah (season 5); Adam Amiruddin (season 6–9); Hazimin Hamdan (season 10–12); Khairul Aimran Ibrahim (season 13–present); Putranda Pahlevi Ruslan (season 14); Mohd Imran Adzman (season 15–present)
- Creative director: Nur Naquyah Burhanuddin
- Voices of: Nur Fathiah Diaz; Asyiela Putri Azhar; Hj. Burhanuddin Md Radzi; Hjh. Ainon Ariff; Ida Shaheera Azhar; Ida Rahayu Yusoff; Mohd Shafiq Mohd Isa; Tang Ying Sowk
- Opening theme: "Upin & Ipin" theme tune (season 1–4, 6–8, 19–present); "Sahabat Selamanya" by Padi (season 5); "Gembira Bermain" (season 9–18)
- Country of origin: Malaysia
- Original language: Malay
- No. of seasons: 20
- No. of episodes: 759 (list of episodes)

Production
- Producers: Hj. Burhanuddin Md Radzi; Hjh. Ainon Ariff
- Running time: 4–5 minutes (season 1–2); 7 minutes (season 3–5); 6–7 minutes (season 6–present)
- Production company: Les' Copaque Production

Original release
- Network: TV9 (Note: TV9 holds the broadcasting rights to the series for 11 seasons until 2017, when it moved to Indonesian TV channels, MNCTV and RCTI for the next seasons.); Astro Ceria; Astro Prima; TV2
- Release: 14 September 2007 – present

Upin & Ipin (Jawi: اوڤين دان ايڤين) is a Malaysian children's animated television series and media franchise created by Burhanuddin Md Radzi and his wife, Ainon Ariff and is produced by Les' Copaque Production, based in Shah Alam, Selangor. The series made its premiere on TV9 for 11 seasons and on Astro Ceria, Astro Prima and TV2 simultaneously from season 12 onwards. It subsequently made its premiere in Indonesia on MNCTV (formerly TPI) and RCTI. The series also released widely for online streaming on both Disney+ and Netflix.

The series follows Upin and Ipin, the five-year-old (later six-year-old) twin brothers, both of whom are characterised by their abundance of energy, imagination and curiosity about the world. Both twins, who lost their parents while they were still babies, live with their older sister Ros and grandmother, whom they call Opah, at the fictional Kampung Durian Runtuh. Overarching themes include the focus on family, growing up, and Malaysian culture. The Malaysian traditional kampung environment inspires the show's setting.

Originally a side project for the Malaysian animated film Geng: The Adventure Begins (2009), Upin & Ipin premiered on 14 September 2007 on TV9 as a six episode Ramadan and Eid-ul-Fitr special, to teach children the significance of the Islamic holy month of Ramadan and Shawwal. A second season, also centered on Ramadan, aired in 2008 spanning 12 episodes. From the third season onwards, the series is produced as a year-long season with 42 episodes. It is the longest running animated series on Malaysian television.

Upin & Ipin has received consistently high viewership in Malaysia on both broadcast television and video-on-demand services. It has influenced the development of merchandise, a feature film and a stage show featuring its characters. The program has been recognised by The Malaysia Book of Records (MBOR) thrice and has won numerous awards, including the 2007 Kuala Lumpur International Film Festival 2007 for Best Animation and the 26th Anugerah Bintang Popular Berita Harian for Most Popular Local Animation Character. Critics have praised the series for its modern and positive depiction of cultural heritage and everyday family life.

== Characters ==
Upin and Ipin, the titular characters, are five-year-old twin brothers who are curious and energetic. They live with their 17-year-old sister, Ros, and their 68-year-old grandmother Uda (whom they call Opah) in a village called Kampung Durian Runtuh in an unspecified location in Malaysia. (Note: Details in certain episodes and films inconclusively link the village to the states of Perak, Selangor, Penang, or Malacca.) Their parents died during their infancy. Upin and Ipin study in the village's kindergarten, Tadika Mesra with a group of classmates, including the adorable and right-thinking Mei Mei, the poetic joker Jarjit Singh, the clumsy and short-tempered Ehsan, the easygoing and sarcastic Fizi, and the entrepreneurial and meticulous Mail.

The headman of Kampung Durian Runtuh is 72-year-old Isnin bin Khamis, better known as Tok Dalang, the wayang kulit puppeteer. Tok Dalang owns a cluster of rambutan trees for commercial purposes. He has a grandson named Badrol who first appears in Geng: The Adventure Begins, and a rooster named Rembo. Among the village's other notable residents are Muthu, owner of the village's only food stall, who lives with his animal whisperer son Rajoo and family pet cow Sapy; Salleh (Sally), a feminine-apparent who owns a mobile library, works as a radio announcer, and also an online seller, and Ah Tong, a strident-voiced vegetable farmer.

Additionally, new characters were introduced in later seasons: an Indonesian girl named Susanti who moved to Kampung Durian Runtuh with her family in season 3, Ijat (who often faints), Dzul, Devi, and an unmentioned and rarely appearing girl student named Nurul. The titular characters are voiced by Nur Fathiah Diaz for the first three seasons; from season 4 onwards, both twins are voiced by Asyiela Putri, while supporting and additional characters are voiced by the series' production staff and are referred to by their first names.

== Development ==
=== Conception ===
"I wanted to prove a few points with Upin & Ipin, to gauge the Malaysian reaction to an animation series by a local company ... But once out, everyone fell in love with Upin and Ipin. Those who were used to typical Western animation like the Disney characters, found the lovable Upin and Ipin very refreshing ... I believe that good story telling is what makes Upin & Ipin popular."

— Burhanuddin Md Radzi, 2014

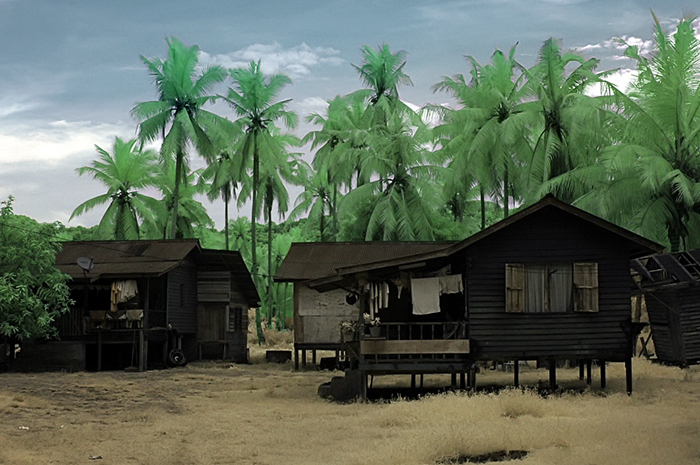
A typical Malaysian kampung house, which the Kampung Durian Runtuh is modelled after.

Upin and Ipin were originally created as a supporting characters for Geng: The Adventure Begins, produced by Shah Alam-based animation studio Les' Copaque Production, co-founded in December 2005 by Burhanuddin Md Radzi and his wife, Ainon Ariff. Prior to Les' Copaque, Burhanuddin spent 20 years in the oil and gas industry. The series was inspired by his experience growing up in the kampung. He wanted to portray the importance of children participating in imaginative play, creating the title characters Upin and Ipin to give the series a Malaysian voice. Burhanuddin's wife, Ainon, conceived the idea for the show, despite having no professional qualifications in the animation or film industry. When he expressed his idea to produce Upin & Ipin, he recalled some people doubting the idea, saying it would not work. He said: "They told me that the audience would not accept this idea because it was set in a kampung. I was laughed at for my kampung idea". Malaysian TV network TV9 acquired the series, but in France instead of Malaysia. He then brought the Upin & Ipin video clip to the Cannes Film Festival in 2006. After returned to Malaysia from Cannes, Burhanuddin and his team conducted a research process and said: "We found that the Asian continent is looking for animation that is adapted to our culture and will benefit children". The creation of Upin & Ipin went through four important processes before being selected for technical reasons. However, he has stated that he did not want to make the series as an "Islamic animation", but he and the production team still "embedded those values" in the series.

Series animator Safwan Karim said: "We started this four-minute animated series to test the local market's acceptance and gauge how the reaction to our storytelling abilities would be". Series director Nizam Razak said, for the series, aspects of Malaysian culture set in a relaxed village are highlighted to attract the interest of the international market, citing the Japanese animated series, Doraemon, which is a bestseller worldwide despite being set in local culture rather than international culture. In 2009, Nizam, Safwan, and Anas Abdul Aziz left Les' Copaque and set up their own animation studio, Animonsta Studios, but the production of Upin & Ipin continued with Usamah Zaid Yasin serving as its director until 2013 when he left the company to establish WAU Animation.

When asked about Upin and Ipin's bald image, Burhanuddin said that the twin brothers were deliberately portrayed as bald as the hair dyeing process is quite expensive, while the names Upin and Ipin were inspired by U and I, before it was decided to become Upin and Ipin. Initially, the twin's parents were going to be included in the series. However, due to time constraints and dateline, Les' Copaque decided to portray Upin and Ipin as orphans. While telling the story behind the making of Upin & Ipin in a morning chat session held in Cyberjaya on February 24, 2022, Burhanuddin revealed that the characters of Upin and Ipin's parents were not created by coincidence because they had to chase the deadline for the broadcast which was tight at the time. He also admitted that Upin and Ipin were not originally created to be orphans. He said, "However, the situation at that time caused the characters of their parents to not be completed and instead, the next episode began with a scene of visiting the graves of the twins' parents".

=== Production ===
The stories featured in Upin & Ipin depict the twin brothers engaging in imaginative play. Nur Naquyah Burhanuddin, Les' Copaque Production's Creative Content Director and Burhanuddin's daughter, explained that there was no particular reason why the twin brothers were featured in their first animated series. Initially, Les' Copaque only planned to produce a story about a naughty boy in a family and who had no friends. However, it was difficult to be certain about whether a boy would communicate on his own and how far a boy could be naughty. Burhanuddin and Ainon write most of the episode scripts. There are few writers besides the husband and wife duo, including Aliya Nazlan, Rezzuhawa Razali and Nor Aizan Embong, as well as the couple's daughter Nur Naquyah.

Upin & Ipin is animated in-house at Les' Copaque Production in Shah Alam, Selangor, where approximately 200 people work on the program. Upon the completion of the third season, Les' Copaque changed the series format to seven minutes and added episode total to 42. The production team also decided to focus more on universal content rather than on Islamic content as they found that "it [was] hard to sell [the series] globally" if Upin & Ipin continued focused on Islamic content. Much like any other animated series in the world with a shorter running time, the duration for each of the series' episodes is only seven minutes. From this process, the scriptwriter will determine the story's momentum to create a climax in each episode. Each episode consists of three parts with a duration of seven minutes for each episode. This is similar to the three-act structure, beginning, middle, end, where each episode has its own beginning, middle and end before reaching the third episode which also has its own three-act structure.

Upin & Ipin (and also Geng) is animated using the Autodesk Maya. In a press conference on the animation software in 2009, Les' Copaque's Chief Designer Fuad Md. Din said: "One of the reasons we chose this software was because it was easy. Moreover, we have experience using it before." Burhanuddin described the series' animation process "is like making a film too, [but] just without actors".

=== Casting ===
The titular characters, Upin and Ipin, were voiced by Nur Fathiah Diaz for the first three seasons. From season 4 onwards, Asyiela Putri provides her voice for the twin brothers, replacing Nur Fathiah, who left the series to provide her voice for BoBoiBoy. The series' supporting and recurring characters were voiced by Les' Copaque staff throughout the season and they are referred to by their first names. Series producer Burhanuddin provides the voice for Tok Dalang, while his wife, Ainon, is the voice of Opah.

Les' Copaque, according to Burhanuddin, will usually hold an audition to find the right voice cast for each character. This is to ensure that they will find voice actors who know how to portray their characters and not just read the script. The series' production team will also prioritise quality. Before the animation production begins, they will conduct voice recording sessions beforehand.

The series also features special/cameo appearances by well-known Malaysian celebrities in certain episodes, like Aziz Sattar, Jamali Shadat and Afdlin Shauki, as well as former Prime Minister Mahathir Mohamad and wife, Siti Hasmah Mohamad Ali, and cartoonist Lat.

=== Music ===
Yuri Wong served as the composer of the Upin & Ipin theme music for four seasons and from season 5 onwards, Mohd Azfaren Aznam serves as the theme music composer. On 29 September 2010, Indonesian rock band Padi recorded a new theme song for the show, entitled "Sahabat Selamanya" ("Friends Forever"). Its accompanying music video, which aired on Indonesian television stations in August, shows the band singing their song in Upin and Ipin's yard, as well as selected scenes from the show.

In 2011, Les' Copaque partnered with Nova Muzik to produce an Eid-ul-Fitr album, Seronoknya Raya Bersama Upin & Ipin which features vocals from Asyiela Putri as the voices of Upin and Ipin. A year later, in 2012, Asyiela collaborated with Najwa Latif for the song "Terima Kasih Cikgu" in conjunction with Teachers' Day and an accompanying episode of the same title.

In September 2016, Upin & Ipin collaborated with few international artists including Katy Perry and Shakira for the worldwide version of "Imagine" by John Lennon, former lead singer of English rock band the Beatles, with its accompanying music video launched by the United Nations Children's Fund (UNICEF). As the national ambassador of UNICEF Malaysia, Upin and Ipin provide a little part in the music video by singing "Imagine all the people..." in their Manglish dialect. Also featured in the video were will.i.am, Neymar, Priyanka Chopra, Idris Elba, David Guetta and Adam Lambert as well as Lennon who appeared twice in the video.

In 2020, a new song titled "Goyang Upin & Ipin" was released on its official YouTube channel on August 3, breaking records when it was viewed over a million times within 24 hours.

== Themes ==
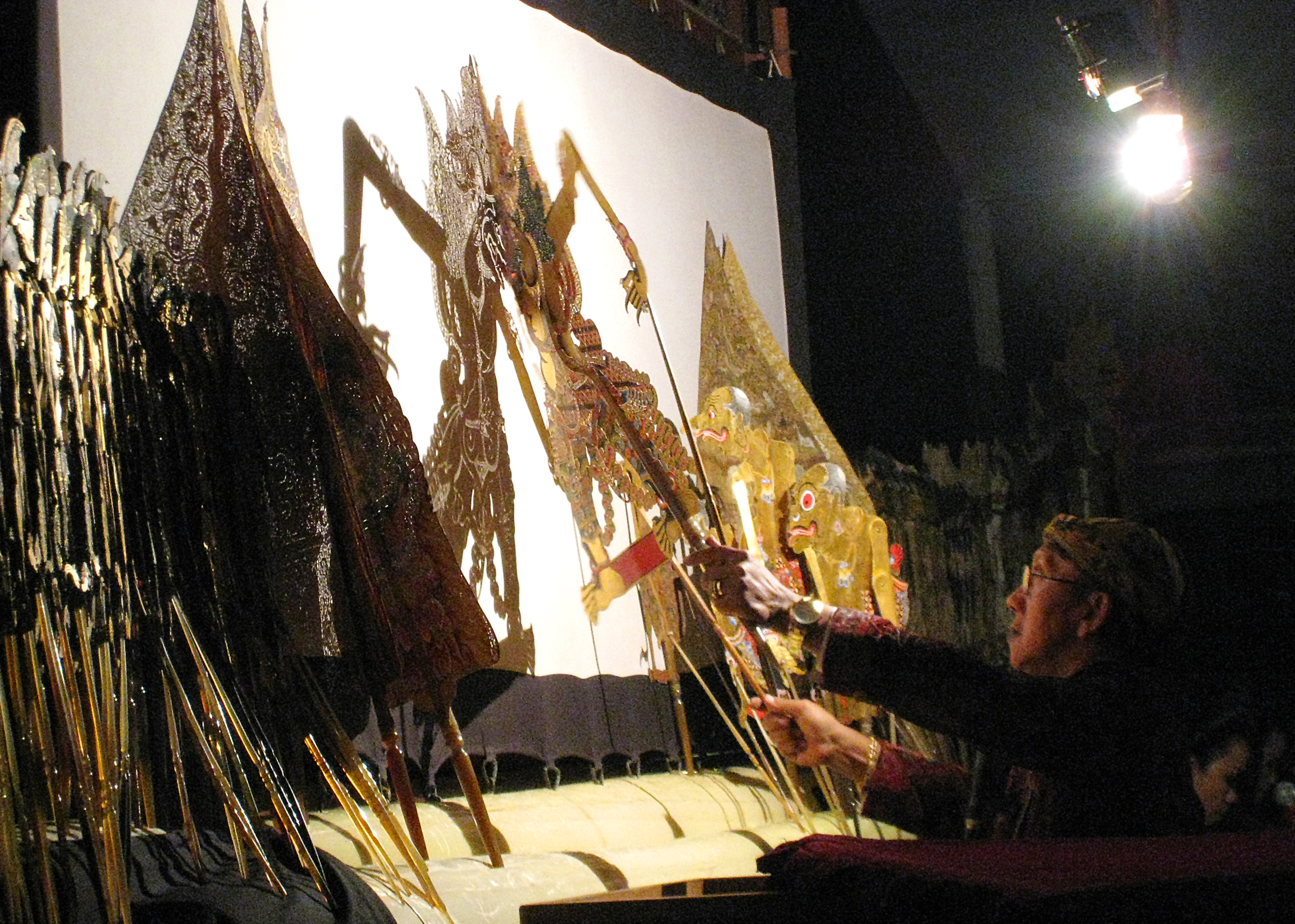
A traditional wayang kulit performance inspires the storyline for the series' episode "Di Sebalik Tabir".

A central theme of the series is the influence of a supportive family; this is reflected in the relationships between Upin, Ipin, Ros and Opah. The series also highlighted cross-cultural themes such as responsibility, honesty and loyalty. Karyabudi Mohd Aris, Les' Copaque's Head of International Marketing explains that the series promotes child participation and social values of mutual respect, a sense of family and community, as well as the strong bonds of relationship. The twin brothers are shown to navigate their sibling relationship throughout the episodes, learning how to work together, compromise, and resolve conflicts. Dahlan Abdul Ghani from Universiti Kuala Lumpur (UniKL) examines that the series has a constitutive role in disseminating ideologies, concepts, symbolism and metaphors. Upin and Ipin's role in upholding the Islamic way of life is explored with the depiction of the fasting month of Ramadhan, celebrating Eid-ul-Fitr, learning the Quran and understanding the five pillars of Islam. Halimah Mohamed Ali, senior lecturer at the School of Humanities, Universiti Sains Malaysia (USM) described the series "using an electronic media as the main purpose in educating the children", while Mohd Tajuddin Mohd Rasdi, Professor of Architecture at the UCSI University, described the series "could assist in rebuilding this nation".

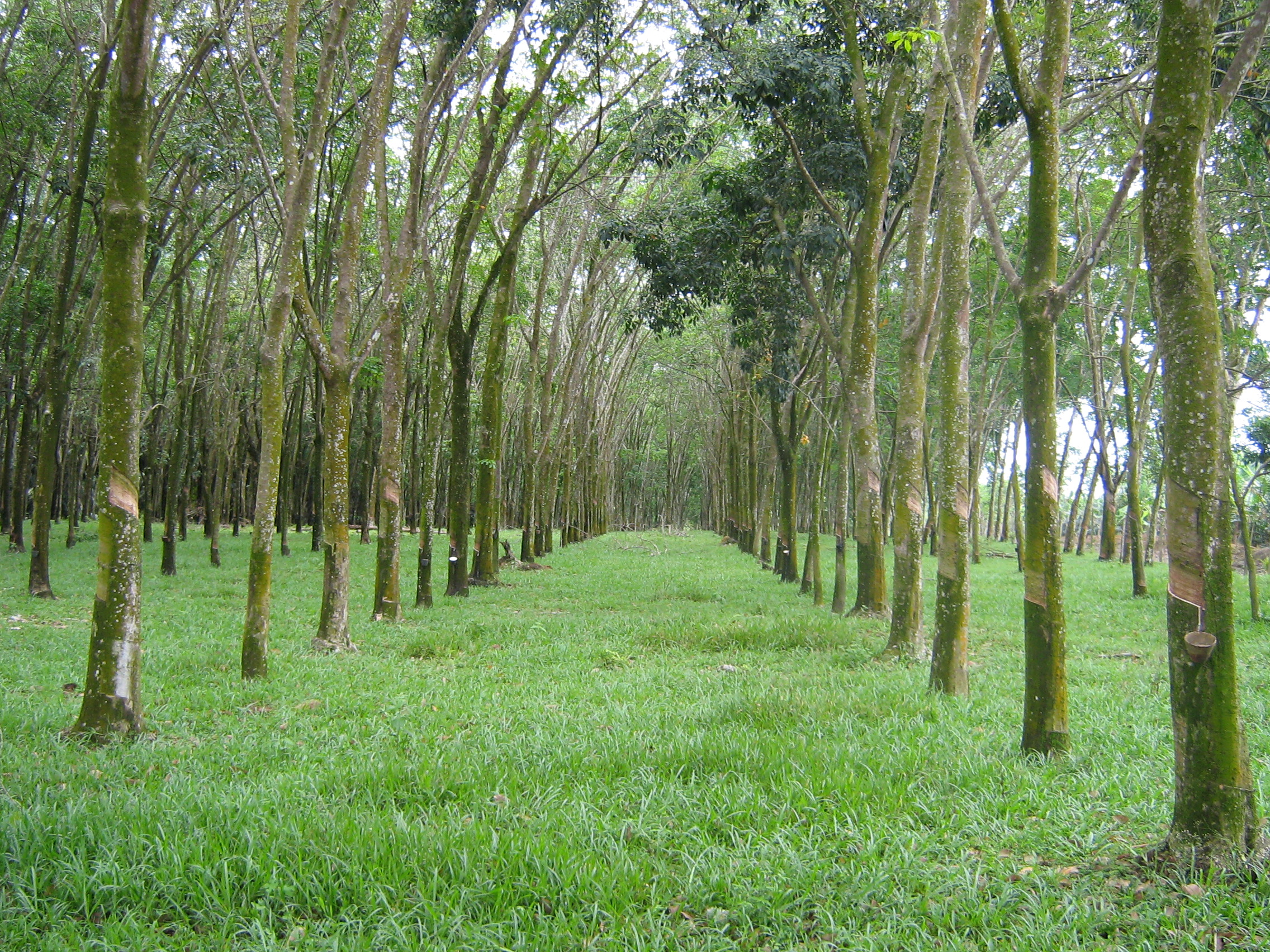
Natural rubber trees are featured in the series as an example of agriculture in Malaysia.

The series also depicts Malaysian contemporary culture and portraying harmonious relationships among different ethnic groups. The Malaysian cuisine also often appears in Upin & Ipin to reflect the diversity of Malaysia as a multi-racial country. The series has a focus on the Malaysian traditional games with some of the games featured including konda kondi, lompat getah and marbles. Upin & Ipin detail the exploration of Malaysia's climate and nature, with characters encountering tropical weathers such as rains and thunderstorms, and Malaysian wildlife such as elephants, giraffes, tigers and parrots. The series explores Malaysian sports through the inclusion of football, as depicted in the episode "Anak Harimau" ("The Tiger Cubs"), which explores Upin and Ipin's dream to become the professional footballers. Performing arts also highlighted in the series, through the inclusion of wayang kulit, as seen in the episode "Di Sebalik Tabir" ("Behind the Scenes"), where the twin brothers having curious on the traditional wayang kulit performance. Agriculture of Malaysia are also depicted in the series, including natural rubber trees as seen in the episode "Mainan Baru" ("New Toys") and palm trees in the episode, "Minyak Sawit" ("Palm Oil"), whereas the episode "Hasil Tempatan" ("Locally Produced") explores Upin and Ipin's deep knowledge of fruits that are planted and harvested in Malaysia. Some of the fruits appeared in the episode including durians, bananas and rambutans. Upin & Ipin also explores the flora of Malaysia, with the inclusion of rose, common sunflower and the common lantana. Space exploration also depicted in the series, as seen in the episode "Upin & Ipin Angkasa" ("Upin & Ipin in Space"), which explores the twin brothers embarked their journey into space and their dream to become astronaut. Some of the series episodes also highlighted certain awareness issues, including corruption in the episode "Perangi Rasuah" ("Fight Corruption") and fire hazard in the episode "Sedia Menyelamat" ("Ready for Action"). Health issues also highlighted, as depicted in the episodes "Jom Hidup Sihat!" ("Let's Live Healthy!") and "Hapuskan Virus!" ("Destroy the Virus!"). Several episodes have highlights futuristic themes with distinctive fantasy elements, such as "Demi Metromillenium" ("For Metromillenium") and "Selamatkan Neo Santara" ("Save Neo Santara"). Anthropomorphism also depicted in the series, where everyday items such as pencils and clocks were humanized. The episode, "Teroka Lautan" ("Exploring the Oceans") depicts Upin, Ipin and their friends imagined themselves into a marine life, while the episode "Tanya Sama Pokok" ("Talking to the Tree") where the twin brothers imagined themselves into a cactus, as an example of anthropomorphism in Upin & Ipin. The Season 20 episode, "Aku Ada Nilai" ("I Have the Values"), depicted the twin brothers and their friends in a banknote form.

The series advocates the importance of play throughout childhood. Upin and Ipin are the vehicle used to display this theme; the episode "Belajar Sambil Main" ("Play and Learn") features the twin brothers and their friends engaged in play and learn method using the tablets. Science topics also highlighted in Upin & Ipin; the episode "Ekosistem" ("The Ecosystem") where Upin, Ipin and their friends learned about the ecosystem life in school garden. The series episodes also emphasizing moral values; the episode "Ikhlas Dari Hati" ("Sincere From the Heart") features the twin brothers engage in importance of sharing with others without expecting anything in return, while the episode "Gerobok Rezeki" ("Abundance"), Upin and Ipin are shown to learn about the importance of setting aside abundance to be distributed to those in need. The characters also experience emotions such as jealousy, disappoinment and regret, which form the central conflicts of the show. Nur Naquyah commented that, while the series retained its original identity, the production team did not want to neglected Malaysians within the story contexts of the country's societies.

The character of Ipin is shown to have being obsessed with fried chicken, while Ros is known to be very strict with Upin and Ipin when everything goes wrong. Ehsan is shown to have certain offensive nature associated with his personality, including being pampered and showing off. He is also known by the moniker, Intan Payung, acknowledging that him being his father's beloved son. Nurul was introduced as a profoundly unmentioned and rarely appearing character who appeared outside the kindergarten in the episode "Cerita Kami" ("Our Story"); the character also is shown to never spoke any single words but in the episode "Ekosistem" ("The Ecosystem"), she was shown to have speaking terms with Mei Mei. The episode "Mimpi Terindah" ("A Beautiful Dream") alludes to the fact that Upin and Ipin's parents' face are not shown, while addressing the story on the twin brothers' longing for their parents without specifically labelling the reason of their parents' death. It was also reported that "Istimewa Hari Ibu" ("Mother's Day Special") subtly approaches the twin brothers' fond memories with their late mother, while "Secebis Kenangan Abah" ("A Pieces of Father's Memory") aptly delves their memories with their late father.

== Episodes ==
The first season premiered in Malaysia on TV9 on 14 September 2007, with 6 episodes aired during Ramadan and Eid ul-Fitr. The second season, with following 12 episodes began airing on 5 September 2008, also during Ramadan and Eid-ul-Fitr. It was reported that production had begun on a third season of 42 episodes; the order was made official in October 2008. From the third season onwards, Upin & Ipin produced as a year-long production seasons, with 42 episodes lasting up to seven minutes with a Mother's Day-themed special. The episode "Kembara Ke Pulau Harta Karun" produced as a 8-part episode of the season and continued in sixth season for another 3-part. The fourth season began airing on 15 March 2010, with its focus as a tribute to sports, as it was developed in a year full of sport events. The fifth season began airing from 12 March 2011 to 31 December 2011. The sixth season began airing on 18 March 2012 with a special episode, "Kenangan Mengusik Jiwa" produced as a tribute to Malaysian silver screen legend, P. Ramlee. The final episode of the sixth season, an episode produced in collaboration with the Fire and Rescue Department of Malaysia (JBPM) titled "Sedia Menyelamat", aired on 30 December 2012.

The seventh season was scheduled to air on 2 March 2013, but due to technical problems, it has been pushed to 9 March. The eighth season started airing on 30 May 2014, with the introduction of crossover with the Ultra Series franchise in episode 9, which is co-produced by Tsuburaya Productions. The crossover began aired from 14 to 16 November 2014. The ninth season began aired on 20 March 2015 with the 3-part crossover episode, "Ultraman Ribut II" aired from 13 to 15 November, followed by the tenth season, started airing on 9 April 2016 with a Deepavali-themed special. The eleventh season premiered on 25 March 2017 and would be the last season of the series which TV9 hold the broadcasting rights before moved to MNCTV and Astro for the following season. After 11 seasons aired on TV9, Upin & Ipin began its Indonesian premiere on MNCTV, with the twelfth season become the first season to be aired there after the network acquired the official broadcasting rights for the series.

Series	Episodes	Originally released		
Series	Episodes	First released	Last released	Network
1	6	14 September 2007	13 October 2007	TV9
2	12	5 September 2008	6 October 2008	TV9
3	42	2 February 2009	30 December 2009	TV9
4	42	15 March 2010	29 December 2010	TV9
5	42	12 March 2011	31 December 2011	TV9
6	42	18 March 2012	30 December 2012	TV9
7	42	2 March 2013	28 December 2013	TV9
8	42	30 May 2014	25 December 2014	TV9
9	42	20 March 2015	1 January 2016	TV9
10	42	9 April 2016	31 December 2016	TV9
11	42	25 March 2017	30 December 2017	TV9
12	42	23 May 2018	5 January 2019	MNCTV; Astro Prima; Astro Ceria
13	42	20 April 2019	26 December 2019	MNCTV; Astro Prima; Astro Ceria
14	42	1 May 2020	15 March 2021	MNCTV; Astro Prima; Astro Ceria
15	42	13 April 2021	29 March 2022	MNCTV; Astro Prima; Astro Ceria
16	42	3 April 2022	3 April 2023	MNCTV; Astro Prima; Astro Ceria
17	42	17 April 2023	15 March 2024	MNCTV; Astro Prima; Astro Ceria
18	42	15 March 2024	1 January 2025	Astro Prima
19	42	4 March 2025	27 February 2026	Astro Prima; MNCTV
20	TBA	12 March 2026	TBA	Astro Prima; Astro Ceria; MNCTV

== Release ==
=== Broadcast ===
Upin & Ipin began premiered on TV9 for 11 seasons from 14 September 2007 until 30 December 2017. The broadcasting rights of the show then acquired by Astro and broadcast on both Astro Ceria and Astro Prima following a partnership signed between Astro Malaysia Holdings and Les' Copaque in 2018, replacing TV9 who holds the broadcasting rights for 11 seasons. The series' tenth season become the first season of Upin & Ipin to be simulcasted through blocktime and content distribution partnership arrangements with Radio Television Malaysia (RTM) on TV2 and began aired on 10 July 2021. The Indonesian broadcasting rights for Upin & Ipin were acquired by MNCTV and RCTI, while the Singaporean broadcasting rights acquired by Mediacorp's Suria and the Bruneian broadcasting rights acquired by Radio Television Brunei (RTB).

The Walt Disney Company holds the international broadcasting rights to the series following a partnership signed between Les' Copaque and Disney. The series premiered on Disney Channel Asia on 23 November 2009 where the third season become the series' first season released for international market with English dub until December 2020 and made available for online streaming on Disney+ Hotstar (now Disney+) starting 1 June 2021. Starting 7 April 2021, Upin & Ipin released widely on Netflix in the United Kingdom and Australia.

=== Home media releases ===
The series was first distributed on DVD by Music Valley from volume 1 to 6 and from 12 to 29, while volume 7–11 distributed by Sony Music Malaysia. From volume 30 onwards, the series was distributed by Rusa Music.

== Reception ==
=== Influence and legacy ===
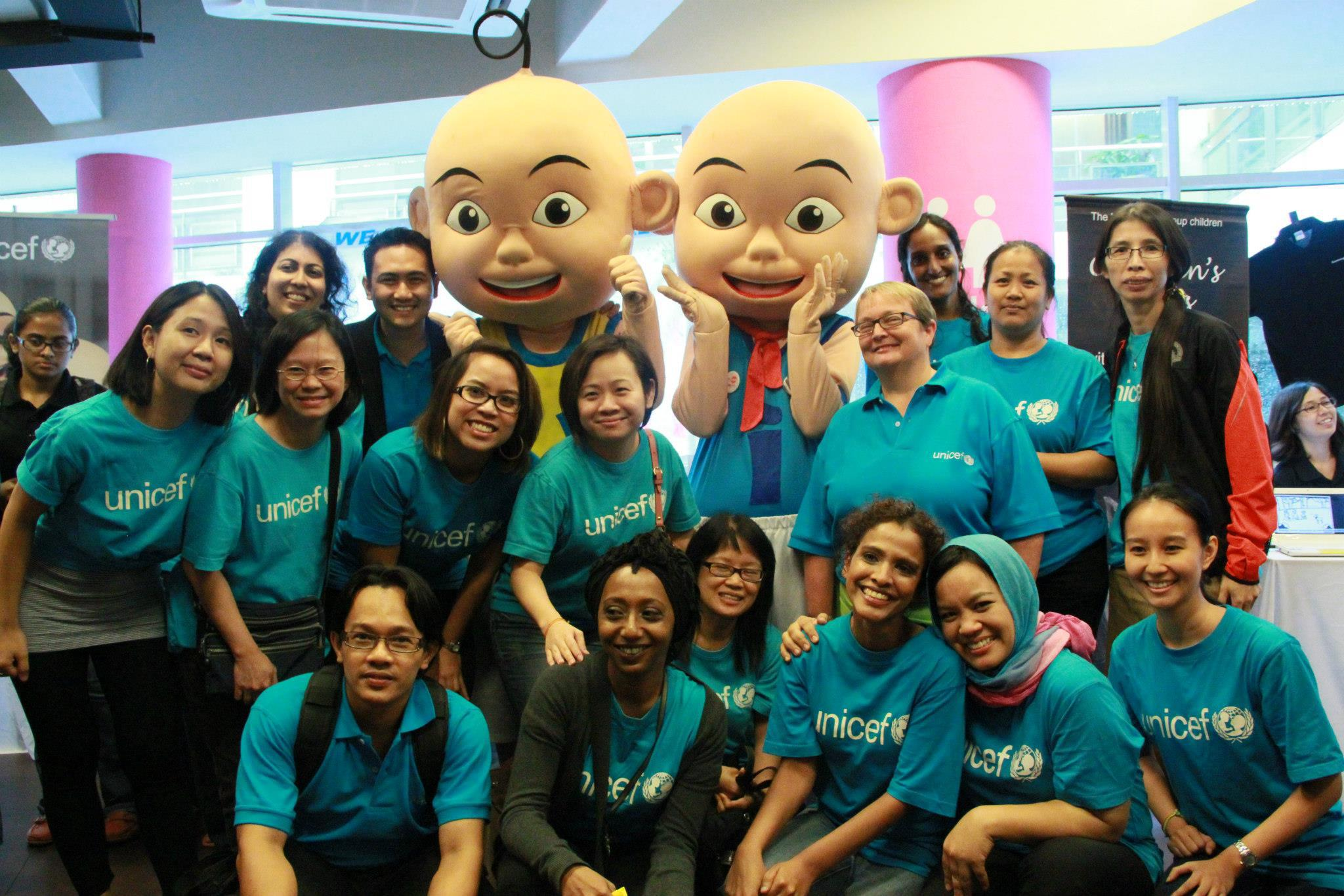
UNICEF Malaysia Team with Upin & Ipin.

Since its debut in 2007, Upin & Ipin has wielded its influence in countries of the Malay archipelago, notably in Malaysia and Indonesia which share linguistic and cultural similarities. Its first season landed its first award, for Best Animation at the 2007 Kuala Lumpur International Film Festival (KLIFF).

From 29 May to 7 June 2009, Upin & Ipin become the ambassador of the Read Malaysia, the country's largest book fair, which was held at the Mines International Exhibition and Convention Centre (MIECC), Mines Resort City.

The twin brothers subsequently appointed as the nutrition ambassador of Wyeth Nutrition's nutritional formula products, Progress and Promise, in June 2010.

In December 2010, the Upin & Ipin franchise had garnered income about RM12 million in 2009 and 2010, mostly the sales of the franchise's series to the international broadcasters.

In 2011, Upin & Ipin was recognized as the "Most Successful Animation" by the Malaysia Book of Records due to its widespread popularity across the ASEAN region.

In March 2013, Upin & Ipin is appointed as the UNICEF Malaysia's National Ambassadors for two years. UNICEF representative to Malaysia, Wivina Belmonte said the appointment was made with the aim that the twins "would help to champion the rights and well-being of children, as well as instilling respect towards girls and women".

The Ultra Series crossover special was received positively during its release in 2014. As a response, the crossover character in the special, Ultraman Ribut (ウルトラマンリブット, Urutoraman Ributto) was officially recognized as a canon character by Tsuburaya Productions, later making its live-action debut in the web series Ultra Galaxy Fight in 2019.

The twin brothers was appointed as the ambassador of the inaugural Japan Halal Expo 2014 by the Halal Media Japan. The expo took place at the Makuhari Messe, Tokyo from 26 to 27 November 2014.

A 3D mural of the series' characters including Upin and Ipin was displayed at the outside of Les' Copaque Production's headquarters in Shah Alam in early March 2016.

Upin & Ipin was appointed as the Malaysian Tourism Ambassador by the Ministry of Tourism, Arts and Culture (MOTAC) in August 2017. The appointment makes the twin brothers as the 12th tourism ambassador, joining other Malaysian celebrities including fashion designer Jimmy Choo, singer Yuna and celebrity chef, Ismail Ahmad.

During the gala screening of Upin & Ipin: The Lone Gibbon Kris at the GSC Mid Valley, Kuala Lumpur on 5 March 2019, the then-Education Minister, Maszlee Malik described that Upin & Ipin has made as an ambassadors of love for "their display of love and harmony among Malaysians". He said: "Upin and Ipin portrays a plural society that respect one another, and this is what we want to bring in our society. This animation also plays a role in promoting harmony, the plural society and love that exist among the people in the country".

In March 2022, Upin & Ipin was appointed as the ambassador of the Children's National COVID-19 Immunisation Programme (PICKids) by the then-Health Minister, Khairy Jamaluddin. At the same time, Les' Copaque's latest short video featuring the twins along with an animated version of Khairy at the Vaccination Centre (PPV) in their village, Kampung Durian Runtuh, has been released. In the short video, Upin and Ipin are seen arriving at the PPV to receive their vaccinations, accompanied by their grandmother Opah and their sister Ros.

Upin & Ipin along with BoBoiBoy and Ejen Ali (both created by former Upin & Ipin animators) joined the National Day Parade during the Malaysia National Day on 31 August 2024. Also joining the parade was a replica of Rumah Opah, where the twin brothers grew up and lived, which was carried in a decorated car.

=== Critical reception ===
Upin & Ipin has received positive critical reception. In a retrospective review on the show, Review Stream commented that "nothing can match the Upin & Ipin series in terms of relevance, practicality and the value it provides". Meor Shariman, writing for the New Straits Times, described the twin brothers in the series as the "super twins". Reporters for Harian Metro acknowledged that the series "has its own attraction" and "more than just entertainment, but is also recognized as rich in good moral values to emulate". John Peter Tan of The Rakyat Post wrote that Upin & Ipin become an "inspiration and entertainment for the public" and "has a huge followers". Muhammad Ridhwan Roslan of Astro Gempak commending that the twin brothers were perceived as the "friends of Malaysian children". Writing for The Star Online, Angelin Yeoh commented that Upin & Ipin's success "lies in the simplicity of its concept, which has successfully captured the attention of Malaysian parents who find it relatable and informative". The series was called as "a must-mention" by Ian Jeremiah Patrick of the Malay Mail, while praised the series for "offering a glimpse into the everyday adventures of twin brothers living in and their daily lives in the kampung". Subkhir Cheema of Mashable credited Upin & Ipin as "a game changer for the Malaysian animation industry".

Facebook announced in Memology study results that the Upin & Ipin page was the most popular fictional character page on Facebook worldwide throughout 2011. It became the only local Facebook page with the most visits and shares over the past year, ranking fifth in the world, beating Doraemon and SpongeBob SquarePants. In 2012, Upin & Ipin was the most searched keyword by Malaysian Google users in the TV Show category according to Google Zeitgeist. As of 2013, the series' official Facebook page has reached 7 million fans. Upin & Ipin's TikTok account has reached 7 million followers, which is the highest social media followers in Malaysia, as of March 2021.

=== Viewership ===
Upin & Ipin has received consistently high viewership on TV9 in Malaysia, becoming the most watched children's program across all channels on broadcast television in 2007 and 2008. While season two was on air on Ramadan 2008, it was reportedly watched by 1.5 million viewers on TV9, making it the second most-watched animated series on all of Malaysian television, right behind Doraemon (1.6 mil), yet ahead of SpongeBob SquarePants (800,000). The popularity of Upin & Ipin could have attributed to the commercial success of Malaysia's first CGI-animated feature film, Geng: The Adventure Begins (2009), which featured the twin characters Upin and Ipin, propelling it into the RM 6.31 million mark throughout its seven-week run in Malaysian cinemas as one of the highest-grossing Malay-language films in history.

As the third season reaches its conclusion in late 2009, TV9 reports that Upin & Ipin was viewed by 1.6 million, making it the second most-viewed programme on the channel, just behind the free TV premiere of Geng which was watched by 2.45 million (scoring TVR 12.8). The series' season 14 episode, "Barang Baik, Barang Kita" has achieved 2.9 million views in 48 hours on YouTube, setting a separate record for both Upin & Ipin and Les' Copaque, while season 18 episode, "Minyak Sawit" garnered 3.1 million views upon its premiere on 20 July 2024. Upin & Ipin was the most highest rating television show in Indonesia in 2024.

=== Controversies ===
Throughout its run, Upin & Ipin also drews many criticisms and controversies. In December 2019, many of few netizens had demanded Les' Copaque to improve the morals depicted in the series which allegedly drews controversy among fans. They were asked to "stop allowing their characters to use foul language as it is feared that it could have a bad influence on children" and "increase content with noble values or simply cancel their show if they fail to do so" as well as asking for the character of Sally to be removed immediately.

In 2020, Fizi, one of the series' characters, has drawn criticism from Indonesian viewers when he making fun of Upin and Ipin in the episode "Syahdunya Syawal" where he responded by saying "Takdelah Syurga!" ("There is no Heaven!") when relating to the phrase 'Heaven under the mother's feet'. Les' Copaque's Creative Content Director, Nur Naquyah Burhanuddin, said that was among their requests after the scene broke the hearts of many viewers. Few days later, Fizi apologized through a video uploaded on their YouTube channel. In the four-minute video, Fizi admitted that he regretted the outburst he had said to Upin and Ipin.

Criticism of Upin & Ipin continues as some parents are concerned about their sexy appearance in the music video "Goyang Upin & Ipin" which is inspired by Indonesian Dangdut. Although comments have been removed on YouTube, the criticism continues on Twitter.

In May 2026, Indonesian YouTuber and content creator, Frans Sanjaya, drews criticism among fans of the show in both countries when he uploaded a video where an employee from the Gubug Wayang Mojokerto Museum, known as Sadan claimed that the show has an Indonesian origin of which its characters including the twin brothers was initially created by a group of animators from Jakarta and Bandung. In the video, they claimed that the series' titular characters were originally not two, but the only one character named 'Aripin'. The two also claimed that the animation project was submitted to an Indonesian television channel in 2008, but was rejected, resulting the project was being sold to Malaysia and developed as an animated series. Their claims received outburst from netizens of both countries, primarily from Malaysian netizens which came in defence to the series. Les' Copaque's founder Burhanuddin Md Radzi issued a statement, saying that the licensing and copyrights of Upin & Ipin belongs to his company and asserted that the series is produced, developed and animated in Malaysia and uses entirely Malaysian voice actors without any involvements of Indonesian talents. Sanjaya then issued an apology via YouTube video, explained that he and Sadan had no intention of "claiming" that the series originated from Indonesia, while acknowledging that "the licencing and copyrights to Upin & Ipin belongs to Malaysia".

=== Popularity in Indonesia ===
Indonesia has been the most obvious export market for Upin & Ipin. In 2009, MNCTV which airs the series in the country reported a TVR of 10.5. Upin & Ipin has also been praised by the Indonesian press; for instance, Fadil Abidin for Analisa who remarked on the vastness of moral content and Islamic values, such as respect for those of different ethnic or religious backgrounds, in a communal setting consisting not only of Malays, Chinese and Indian Malaysians, but also Indonesians.

In March 2010, as the Balinese Hindu community prepare for Nyepi, images of ogoh-ogoh (demonic effigies used for the famed ngrupuk ritual on the eve of Nyepi) which largely resemble Upin & Ipin were exposed on Indonesian media. The effigy reportedly cost 4 million rupiah.

The series was called as a "Malaysian propaganda to the entire world" by Agung Suprio, the Indonesian Broadcasting Commission (KPI) Chairman in an interview with Deddy Corbuzier's podcast on 11 September 2021.

In January 2022, rumors emerged that Upin and Ipin were based on a true story in a village in Indonesia after a TikTok video went viral on social media. Les' Copaque, via its statement on Twitter, explained that the claim was completely untrue as all the stories depicted in the series are purely fictional and are not taken or inspired by the stories of any person either living or dead.

The Harian Waspada Medan editor, Muhammad Faisal Jayadi said the use of simple and easy-to-understand language was one of the main factors that Upin & Ipin had succeeded in gaining a place among Indonesians regardless of age. He also described the series as "rich in positive messages besides its cute characters".

Upin & Ipin's popularity in Indonesia was slightly affected when on August 19, 2023, Indonesian media reported that the Governor of Bali, Wayan Koster, urged students on the resort island not to watch Upin & Ipin and prioritize local films and cartoons. Wayan also emphasized that it is important to preserve the Balinese culture despite technological advances and modernization. Les' Copaque's Managing Director, Burhanuddin released a statement in response, stating that Upin & Ipin continues to be well received by fans in the republic, while admitting that Wayan's remarks did not affect the series' popularity in Indonesia.

Indonesian singer, Lyodra Ginting reveals that Upin & Ipin is a must-seen TV show during her childhood and also revealed that it also helps her improve her skills in Bahasa Malaysia proficiency.

=== Awards and nominations ===
List of awards and nominations received by Upin & Ipin
Award	Year	Recipient(s) and nominee(s)	Category	Result	Ref.
Anugerah Bintang Popular Berita Harian	2013	Upin & ipin	Most Popular Local Animated Character	Won	
Anugerah Bintang Popular Berita Harian	2021	Upin & ipin	Popular Animated Character	Nominated	
Anugerah Karyawan Animasi Malaysia	2011	Upin & ipin	Animation Achievement Special Award	Won	
Anugerah Syiar Ramadan	2022	Upin & ipin	Foreign Animation Program	Nominated	
BrandLaureatte Awards	2010	Upin & ipin	Best Brand in Animation	Won	
Child Friendly Broadcasting Awards	2021	Upin & ipin	Best Foreign Animation Program	Won	
Child Friendly Broadcasting Awards	2024	Upin & ipin	Best Foreign Animation Program	Won	
Golden Wing Awards	2019	Upin & ipin	Best Animation	Won	
ICT NEF-Awani Awards	2010	Upin & ipin	ICT NEF-Awani Tun Dr. Mahathir Mohamad Special Awards	Won	
Indonesia Lolipop Award XY Kids!	2010	Upin & ipin	Favourite Animation	Won	
Kuala Lumpur International Film Festival	2007	Upin & ipin	Best Animation	Won	
Mom & Kids Awards	2015	Upin & ipin	Favourite Cartoon Character	Won	
Mom & Kids Awards	2015	Upin & ipin	Favourite Animation	Won	
Mom & Kids Awards	2016	Upin & ipin	Favourite Animation	Won	
Mom & Kids Awards	2017	Upin & ipin	Favourite Animation	Won	
Mom & Kids Awards	2018	Upin & ipin	Favourite Animation	Won	
PROFIMA Awards	2019	Upin & ipin	Best TV Animation	Won	
Shout! Awards	2009	Upin & ipin	Best On-Screen Chemistry	Won	
Southeast Asian Prix Jeunesse Award	2018	Upin & ipin	International Youth Award	Won	
TikTok Malaysia Awards	2023	Upin & ipin	Most Popular Animated Accounts of the Year	Won	
TV3 My Kids Awards	2011	Upin & ipin	Best Cute Animation Character	Won	
TV3 My Kids Awards	2011	Upin & ipin	Most Awesome TV Program	Won	
World Brand Congress Award	2010	Upin & ipin	Brand Leadership Award	Won	

== Other media ==
=== Feature films ===
Geng: The Adventure Begins, an accompanying film to the Upin & Ipin series, was released on 12 February 2009 to popular success. Following the release of Geng, Les' Copaque announced the subsequent Upin & Ipin films, titled Upin & Ipin: Angkasa in mid-2009. But, the film was cancelled and replaced with Laksamana Upin & Ipin, which later abandoned due to unexpected financial and schedule situation which occurred in 2011. The second Upin & Ipin film, titled Upin & Ipin: Jeng Jeng Jeng! was released on 24 November 2016 and co-produced by Les' Copaque Production and KRU Studios. This was then followed by the third film, Upin & Ipin: The Lone Gibbon Kris, released on 21 March 2019.

=== Comics ===
Since December 2009, Upin & Ipin have been adapted into a monthly comic magazine series, titled Majalah Komik Upin & Ipin to be circulated all over Malaysia, published by Nyla Sdn Bhd. Targeted at young readers, the magazine features screenshot comics of the Upin & Ipin TV series and the Geng: Pengembaraan Bermula film, voice actor and production crew profiles, and learning and activity sections. An English version of the comic was launched on 1 May 2011 for international markets.

=== Video games ===
A video game based on the series was developed by Les' Copaque Game Development Inc. (LCGDI), an online game development division of Les' Copaque Production. LCGDI have developed two online games for iOS users, namely Pocket Ipin (2010), Pocket Upin (2012), Upin & Ipin Dash (2012) and Upin & Ipin: Pintar Berdoa (2015) for the Android users.

LCGDI in collaboration with Indonesian video game developer, The WALi Games to co-developed Upin & Ipin KipiBlocks. Modelled after Candy Crush Saga, the Upin & Ipin KipiBlocks allows users need to arrange three of the same animated characters by moving only one block, and complete as many as possible in the set time. A console game, titled Upin & Ipin Universe, was developed by Les' Copaque and published by Streamline Studios. It is an interactive sandbox game with an open-world concept and original story, and features the voice actors from the series. Originally scheduled to be released in September 2024, the game was officially released on 17 July 2025 for Nintendo Switch, PlayStation 4, PlayStation 5 and Windows.

=== Theme parks ===
In March 2011, Les' Copaque planned to build a theme park based on the Upin & Ipin series at a cost of RM200 million in Perak. The company also planned to opened the Upin & Ipin theme parks in China. In 2023, the company announced that the construction of Upin & Ipin theme park which likely to start by the late 2023 with a RM700 million budget and expected to opened either by 2026 and 2027. It was announced that the Upin & Ipin Theme Park is set to opened at the King's Park in Genting Highlands, Pahang with an official opening date is yet to be announced.

=== Merchandise ===
A limited edition plush toys of Upin & Ipin characters was released by KFC Holdings Malaysia (KFC) in collaboration with Les' Copaque and were made available via purchase of fried chicken at all KFC outlets from May 2012.

In April 2022, Upin & Ipin partnered with Tupperware to release a collection of lunch boxes and canisters featuring the series' artworks, which was made available throughout the Ramadhan fasting month. Malaysian children's products brand, MommyHana was named as the merchandising partner for Upin & Ipin in February 2025, releasing a product range for children, including pencil case, school bags and tumblers featuring character designs.

=== Stage show ===
A live stage show based on the series, titled Upin & Ipin the Musical took place from 14 April to 6 May 2012 at the Istana Budaya, Kuala Lumpur. The stage show was starring two pairs of different child actors. A second stage show, Upin & Ipin – Pin Pin Pom! was first staged at the Plenary Hall, Kuala Lumpur Convention Centre on 3 and 4 September 2022. It also toured at the Singapore Indoor Stadium on 18 and 19 December 2022 and co-organised by Les' Copaque and Biz Trends Media.

=== Spin-offs ===
==== Upin & Ipin Iqra' ====
Upin & Ipin Iqra' (Note: Originally titled Upin & Ipin Mengaji.) is a first spin-off of the series that debuted on Astro Ceria in Malaysia and MNCTV in Indonesia starting 4 January 2019. The series is a 7-minute episode centered on reciting al-Quran. In the series, Upin and Ipin with their friends learning Quran with their religious teacher, Ustaz Sheikh Abdulkarim Omar al-Makki. For the series, Les' Copaque using a different rendering method by giving it a touch of 2D animated cartoon drawings. The first two seasons focused entirely on learning the Quran, but it has also shifted to the biography of the Prophet and Messenger in addition to the Quran for the third season.

==== Upin & Ipin: The Helping Heroes ====
Upin & Ipin: The Helping Heroes is the second spin-off of Upin & Ipin that premiered on Les' Copaque YouTube channel on 22 May 2020. The series also premiered on Netflix starting 10 November 2023. The series is a 7-minute episode that features a slight difference of the main titular characters and uses basic English as main medium of instruction to help young viewers to learned how to improved their English proficiency. The Helping Heroes does not take place in Kampung Durian Runtuh. Instead, it takes place in a different settings, with the twin brothers wears a superhero costumes. The title characters in the series was voiced by Nuur Aisyah Zinnirah.

=== Other ===
A segments of personal care products featuring Upin & Ipin artworks manufactured by Wonderland Primary in partnership with Les' Copaque and were made available from June 2010.

The series' fan club, known as Kelab Upin & Ipin (Upin & Ipin Club) began active since 2009 and launched at the Hari Kelab Upin & Ipin at Zoo Negara on 12 June 2010. A children's show, also titled Kelab Upin & Ipin premiered on 4 June 2011 on TV9.

In August 2010, a partnership between Upin & Ipin and Pos Malaysia was announced. A limited edition stamp series, "Siri Setemku Kembara Upin dan Ipin" featuring designs of Upin & Ipin were released by Pos Malaysia in collaboration with Les' Copaque and were made available from September 2012.

A three-day outdoor event, featuring its characters, Karnival Upin & Ipin was held since 2010 to promote the series, with the recent carnival was held at the Melaka International Trade Centre from 15 to 17 December 2023.

A restaurant chain, utilising the series' concept, known as Kedai Makan Upin & Ipin is established with its first branch opened at Section 7, Shah Alam in July 2012 and specializing on Malaysian cuisine. The restaurant is also operated in certain parts of Peninsular Malaysia. In September 2023, Les' Copaque in collaboration with TMG Ventures to launched a family restaurant chain featuring Upin & Ipin characters. Also in September 2023, Les' Copaque also collaborated with Zing Eat to launch the virtual food stall, known as the Upin & Ipin Virtual Dining Experience.

A special edition reloadable debit card, featuring Upin and Ipin was released by Hong Leong Islamic Bank in partnership with Les' Copaque in August 2012. The initiative was intended to help parents to teach their children on the importance of money management and saving.

On 26 November 2016, a specialty channel called Upin & Ipin Bersama Kawan-Kawan began broadcasting on Astro First throughout December 2016 in partnership between Astro and Les' Copaque. The channel airs a compilation of Upin & Ipin episodes and other Les' Copaque shows like Pada Zaman Dahulu, DaDuDiDo and Kembara Warisan Detektif Upin & Ipin.

Upin & Ipin partnered with Gloway Marketing in 2018 to marketed the PinPin snack, which comes with eight product range, including noodle snacks and wafers.

A limited edition gold coin featuring designs of Upin & Ipin were released by Malaysian jewellery company, Habib Jewels in collaboration with Les' Copaque in August 2020. The 0.2 gram gold coin was launched in conjunction with the Habib's Merdeka Exhibition that held on 27 August to 6 September 2020.

A running marathon is organised by Les' Copaque in collaboration with The Marathon Company was first held on 23 December 2018 at the Malaysia Agro Exposition Park Serdang (MAEPS Serdang). The marathon returns for its 2024 edition.

In 2023, Les' Copaque partnered with F&D Mindspot to launch a board game based on the series, titled Upin & Ipin Ke Sana Ke Sini. The board game was released in May.

Upin & Ipin partnered with Baskin-Robbins in August 2026 for a limited time campaign in conjunction with Malaysia's 69 years of independence, entitiled "Eksplorasi Ais Krim Upin & Ipin" ("Upin & Ipin's Ice Cream Exploration"). The campaign features "exclusive co-branded menu items, themed retail environments and in-store activations inspired by the beloved twins".
