= Wivina =

Wivina is a feminine given name. It can refer to:

- Wivina (1103–1168), Benedictine abbess
- Wivina Belmonte, UNICEF representative
- Wivina Demeester (born 1943), Flemish politician
