= Sun Sun Thatha =

2012 Indian Tamil-language film

- Poster
- Directed by: Nassar
- Written by: Nassar
- Produced by: Kameela Nassar
- Starring: Abi Hassan; Jamali Shadat
- Cinematography: Sekhar Vardhan
- Edited by: J. N. Harsha
- Music by: R. Prabhar
- Production company: n Media
- Release date: 8 December 2012
- Running time: 85 minutes
- Country: India
- Language: Tamil

Sun Sun Thatha (transl. Grandfather Sun Sun) is a 2012 Indian Tamil language drama film directed by Nassar. The film stars Abi Hassan and Jamali Shadat with Nassar and Aruna Bala in supporting roles.

== Cast ==
- Abi Hassan as Abi
- Jamali Shadat as Mr. Sun Sun, Abi's godfather
- Nassar as Abi's father
- Aruna Bala as Abi's mother

== Production ==
After a hiatus, Nassar returns to directing with this film. The film was shot in 2010 entirely in Malaysia with his 12-year-old son, Abi Hassan, and Malaysian actor Jamali Shadat, who played the titular role. The film was produced by Nassar's wife, Kameela, a child psychologist. Malaysian actress Aruna Bala and others play supporting roles in the film. The reason for the film's delay was that Nassar did not want it to be Abi's debut film.

== Soundtrack ==
The music was composed by R. Prabhakar (credited as R. Prabhar) and consists of two songs.

== Release ==
The film had a low-key release on 8 December 2012 and was released for two shows in a single theatre. The film was also telecast.

The Times of India gave the film three out of five stars and wrote that "It is not everyday that one comes across a movie that is both short and sweet. Sun Sun Thatha is just that, and all in the right proportions".
