= UNICEF Malaysia =

UNICEF Malaysia Country Office

- Abbreviation: UNICEF Malaysia
- Formation: 1954; 72 years ago
- Type: Intergovernmental organisation (IGO)
- Legal status: Active
- Headquarters: Kuala Lumpur, Malaysia
- Head: Robert Gass (Representative)
- Parent organization: UNICEF
- Website: www.unicef.my

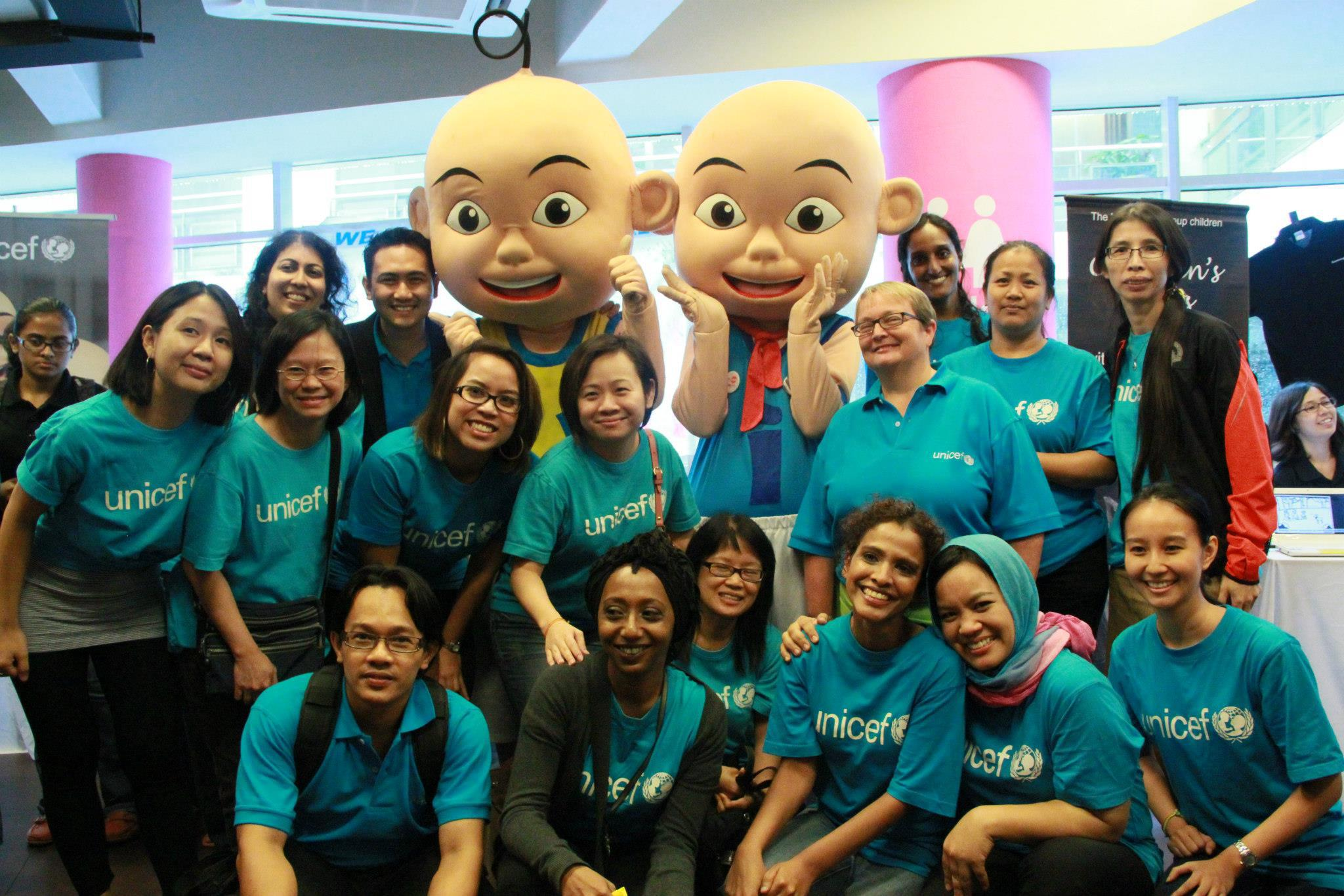
UNICEF Malaysia Team with Upin & Ipin.

UNICEF Malaysia is one of over 190 national offices of the United Nations Children’s Fund. Since its establishment in 1954, UNICEF Malaysia has been on the ground to uphold the rights of children in Malaysia, including their right to an education, healthcare and protection from abuse and exploitation. It also advocates for political change in support of children, and works with partner organizations from the public, charity and private sectors, to effect change. It is a Malaysian affiliate of the UNICEF.

== Overview ==
UNICEF Malaysia is one of over 190 country offices and national committees of the United Nations Children's Fund. Guided by the Convention on the Rights of the Child, UNICEF has a universal mandate to promote and protect the rights of all children, everywhere – especially those hardest to reach and most at risk.

UNICEF has been working with the Government of Malaysia since 1954 by supporting programmes in health, nutrition, water and sanitation, formal and non-formal education as well as services for deprived children in poor urban areas.

UNICEF's work in Malaysia has since evolved with the nation’s development and progress into an upper-middle income country. In addition to helping provide children the best start in life through quality health and education as well as protection from violence, exploitation and abuse, the UN children's agency also works with its partners in Government and civil society to reduce child poverty and engages with businesses to promote child-friendly corporate social responsibility.

The 2011-2015 Country Programme links policies and programmes through a combination of ‘upstream’ and ‘downstream’ work to effect change in the lives of children and their families. This includes using data and good practices to advance and support policies promoting child rights and helping Malaysia invest in children and families by formulating and implementing laws that benefit them.

UNICEF is an intergovernmental organisation (IGO) and thus accountable to its host government. It is funded entirely by the voluntary contributions of individuals, businesses, foundations and governments.

== Convention on the Rights of the Child ==
The Convention on the Rights of the Child (CRC) is a human rights treaty which upholds the civil, political, economic, social, health and cultural rights of all children below 18 years. Adopted by the United Nations General Assembly on 20 November 1989, the CRC defines the universal principles and standards for the status and treatment of children worldwide.

Two optional protocols were adopted on 25 May 2000. The First Optional Protocol restricts the involvement of children in military conflicts, and the Second Optional Protocol prohibits the sale of children, child prostitution and child pornography. A third optional protocol relating to communication of complaints was adopted in December 2011.

The CRC spells out a specific role for UNICEF, in its capacity as the UN body responsible for the rights of children. UNICEF is required to promote the effective implementation of the CRC and to encourage international co-operation for the benefit of children. UNICEF is also entitled to be represented when each country’s implementation of the CRC is considered by the Committee every five years.

Malaysia ratified the CRC in 1995 and the First and Second Optional Protocols in 2012.
