= Jamali Shadat =

Malaysian comedian (1941–2021)

Yang Hormat Dato’ Jamali Shadat DIMP
- جمالي شادات
- Born: 18 September 1942; Kampung Bukit Kapar, Selangor, Federated Malay States (now Malaysia)
- Died: 3 February 2021 (aged 78); Kampung Sungai Pinang, Pulau Indah, Port Klang, Selangor
- Resting place: Sungai Pinang Muslim Cemetery, Pulau Indah, Selangor
- Occupation: Comedian
- Years active: 1975–2020
- Spouse: Datin Lela Yacob (died 2018)
- Children: 8

Jamali Shadat (18 September 1942 – 3 February 2021) was a Malaysian comedian known for his ventriloquism and mimicry which are seen in his roles as Atan and Atok in various stage plays.

== Career ==
His fame began when he was the first runner up of a Bakat TV competition. After his newly found fame, he was invited to record his jokes on gramophones and later on cassettes and CDs. His comedy is known for being able to appeal to people of different racial backgrounds. His life has played a major role in his comedy as the characters of Atan and Atok were inspired by his village and his upbringing where he met people of different races.

== Death ==
Jamali died on 3 February 2021 at age of 78, following an old age. He was laid to rest beside the grave of his late wife at the Sungai Pinang Muslim Cemetery in Pulau Indah, Selangor after Zuhr prayers.

== Filmography ==
- All films are in Malay, unless otherwise noted.

Year	Title	Role	Notes
1983	Aku Yang Berhormat		
1986	Hantu Siang	Tuan Kadi	
2003	Mr. Cinderella 2	Pak Samad	
2009	Senario the Movie Episode 2: Beach Boys	En. Mansor	
2010	Semerah Cinta Stilleto	Pak Wan	
2012	Sun Sun Thatha	Mr. Sun Sun	Tamil film

=== Television ===
Year	Title	Role	Channel	Notes
2007	Raja Lawak Astro	Season 1 Mentor	Astro	
2010	Pontianak Kampung Batu	Tok Ketua	Astro Ria	Telemovie, Special Appearance
2012	Sugeh	Pak Hamid		Telemovie
2016	Upin & Ipin	Atan (voice)	TV9	Appears in 3 episodes

His other television appearances include Atan Oh Atan Oi (2000), and the Jamali Shadat Show (2001).

== Awards and nominations ==
Award	Year	Category	Result
Anugerah Lawak Warna 2014	2014	Special Jury Award - Veteran Artist	Won
