= List of Upin & Ipin episodes =

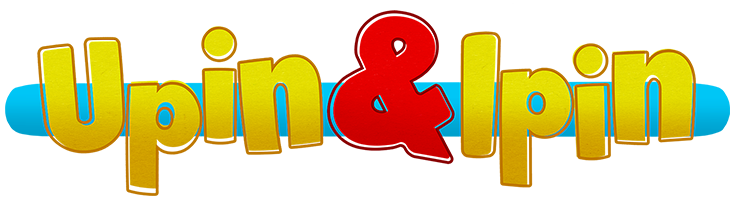

Upin & Ipin is a Malaysian animated television series that premiered since 14 September 2007. The series was created by husband and wife duo, Burhanuddin Md Radzi and Ainon Ariff and is produced by Les' Copaque Production based in Shah Alam, Selangor. The series follows Upin and Ipin, the five-year-old twin brothers who is characterised by their abundance of energy, imagination and curiosity about the world. Both twins, who lost their parents while they were still babies, lived with their older sister, Ros and grandmother, whom they called Opah at the fictional Kampung Durian Runtuh. Overarching themes include the influence of a supportive family, Malaysian culture, and the importance of play throughout childhood. The international broadcasting rights to the series were acquired by Disney Channel Asia in 2009 and dubbed in English.

Since its debut, Upin & Ipin has broadcast 759 episodes across 20 seasons. Malaysian TV channel, TV9 has broadcast the series for 11 seasons. Subsequent seasons were later aired simultaneously on two Astro channels (Prima and Ceria) and RTM's TV2 as well as Indonesian TV channels, RCTI and MNCTV. The first two seasons aired during the Ramadhan and Eid-ul-Fitr between 2007 and 2008, while from season 3 onwards, a subsequent Ramadhan and Eid-ul-Fitr-themed episodes have been aired. A Chinese New Year-themed episode ("Gong Xi Fa Chai") aired as part of seventh season, while a Deepavali-themed episode ("Pesta Cahaya") aired as part of tenth season, as well as COVID-19 pandemic special episode, "Perintah Kawalan Pergerakan" aired as part of fourteenth season.

Originally a side project for a 2009 Malaysian animated film, Geng: The Adventure Begins, also produced by Les' Copaque, Upin & Ipin was expanded as an animated television series. The titular characters are voiced by Nur Fathiah Diaz for the first three seasons, and from season 4 onwards, both twins are voiced by Asyiela Putri. Well-known Malaysian celebrities also made a cameo appearance in some episodes. Episodes have been adapted into picture books, published by Nyla with permission and collaboration with Les' Copaque. Episodes have also been released in volumes on DVD in Malaysia, distributed by Music Valley, Sony Music and Rusa Music.

== Series overview ==
Series	Episodes	Originally released		
Series	Episodes	First released	Last released	Network
1	6	14 September 2007	13 October 2007	TV9
2	12	5 September 2008	6 October 2008	TV9
3	42	2 February 2009	30 December 2009	TV9
4	42	15 March 2010	29 December 2010	TV9
5	42	12 March 2011	31 December 2011	TV9
6	42	18 March 2012	30 December 2012	TV9
7	42	2 March 2013	28 December 2013	TV9
8	42	30 May 2014	25 December 2014	TV9
9	42	20 March 2015	1 January 2016	TV9
10	42	9 April 2016	31 December 2016	TV9
11	42	25 March 2017	30 December 2017	TV9
12	42	23 May 2018	5 January 2019	MNCTV; Astro Prima; Astro Ceria
13	42	20 April 2019	26 December 2019	MNCTV; Astro Prima; Astro Ceria
14	42	1 May 2020	15 March 2021	MNCTV; Astro Prima; Astro Ceria
15	42	13 April 2021	29 March 2022	MNCTV; Astro Prima; Astro Ceria
16	42	3 April 2022	3 April 2023	MNCTV; Astro Prima; Astro Ceria
17	42	17 April 2023	15 March 2024	MNCTV; Astro Prima; Astro Ceria
18	42	15 March 2024	1 January 2025	Astro Prima
19	42	4 March 2025	27 February 2026	Astro Prima; MNCTV
20	TBA	12 March 2026	TBA	Astro Prima; Astro Ceria; MNCTV

== Episodes ==
=== Season 1 (2007) ===
The first season was aired on Fridays, Saturdays and Sundays, at 7.30 pm, in conjunction with Ramadan and Eid-ul-Fitr, which revolves on Upin and Ipin during their first fasting months. The first four shorts debuted early in the holy weeks, followed by reruns from 22 September to 11 October, with two final episodes premiering on Hari Raya itself. It won the Best Animation award in the 2007 Kuala Lumpur International Film Festival.

No. overall	No. in season	Title	English title	Original release date
1	1	"Esok Puasa"	"Let's Fast Tomorrow"	September 14, 2007
The 5-year-old Upin and Ipin began to understand the meaning of "fasting" and wanted to know the purpose and benefits of fasting like other Muslim children of their age. Opah and Kak Ros are ready to explain the purpose and purpose of fasting to them. So, this is the first time these twins break their fast.
2	2	"Dugaan"	"The Test"	September 15, 2007
Upin and Ipin always forget their fasting when they wake up in the morning or after playing in the scorching hot weather, so much so that even their non-Muslim friends like Mei Mei and Rajoo have to remind them.
3	3	"Nikmat"	"Satisfaction"	September 16, 2007
Upin and Ipin began to break their fast after enduring various trials on their first day of fasting. They were both excited and impatient to enjoy the delicious meal on the night of breaking their fast. Their fasting efforts finally paid off when they enjoyed the food until they were full. After that, the two of them fell asleep, forgetting that they should to go to the musolla.
4	4	"Terawih"	"Taraweeh"	September 21, 2007
Upin and Ipin finally followed Opah and Kak Ros to the musolla for taraweeh prayers, after several days of fasting. The taraweeh prayers in conjunction with Ramadan seemed to be an opportunity for children to play with friends instead of worship, Upin, Ipin and their friends were no exception. After sharing their fasting experiences, they also played. Finally, the children's fun ended after Kak Ros ordered them to participate in the prayers.
5	5	"Esok Raya"	"Tomorrow is Eid"	October 12, 2007
Opah tries to convince Upin and Ipin that fasting is an obligation that will be rewarded by Allah. It is common nowadays for parents to give their children money as a reward without teaching them the meaning of fasting.
6	6	"Hari Raya"	"Eid"	October 13, 2007
Upin and Ipin and their friends celebrated Raya together. All of them, who are from different races and religions, enjoy the meal prepared by Opah. After eating, they all share their experiences of fasting while Opah is always there to give them advice and encouragement to fast in the years to come.

=== Season 2 (2008) ===
The second season, titled Upin & Ipin: Setahun Kemudian, went on air in conjunction with Ramadan again, with 12 new episodes, the first six of which were aired and repeated on Fridays, Saturdays and Sundays, 7.00 pm throughout Ramadan while the other six premiered for Hari Raya from 1 till 6 of Shawal.

No. overall	No. in season	Title	English title	Original release date
7	1	"Tadika"	"Pre-School"	September 5, 2008
Upin and Ipin are now at Tadika Mesra. They have many new friends but they are still mischievous. Fizi and Upin defeat their guardian spiders in class before the lesson starts. While studying, Cikgu Jasmin reminds them of the arrival of Ramadan, so Upin, Ipin and their friends discuss their fasting experiences.
8	2	"Anak Bulan"	"New Moon"	September 6, 2008
Upin and Ipin were excited and wanted to know when Ramadan would start, so they asked Kak Ros, who explained to them that Ramadan would start as soon as the new moon was sighted. Amazed by the new knowledge, the twin brothers stayed up all night to look for the new moon, but their plan didn't work out.
9	3	"Adat"	"Traditions"	September 7, 2008
Upin and Ipin asked their grandmother why Cikgu Jasmin wasn't fasting. Kak Ros answered her twin brothers' question by saying that women were given leave by Allah because He loves women. Upin and Ipin still didn't believe it. That evening, their grandmother gave them provisions for Upin and Ipin to give to Tok Dalang. Upin asked why; His grandmother replied that it was a customary.
10	4	"Tamak"	"Greed"	September 12, 2008
Kak Ros took Upin and Ipin to the Ramadan Market to buy food for break fast. Kak Ros gave the twins money to buy just one item, but they overbought fried chicken until it was enough to fill the dining table, so when it was time to eat, they couldn't finish all the chicken they bought.
11	5	"Lailatul Qadr"	"The Night of Decree"	September 13, 2008
Upin and Ipin learns about the meaning of Lailatul Qadr from Opah. They plan to be in the musolla after taraweeh to reciting the Quran. Meanwhile, Ehsan and Fizi arrive at the musolla and invite Upin and Ipin to play with fireworks, but the twin brothers reject their invitation. Meanwhile, the sound of firecrackers exploding began to heard.
12	6	"Kisah dan Tauladan"	"Tales and Lessons"	September 14, 2008
Upin and Ipin's and their classmates were excited about Fizi's bandaged hand, so Fizi told them what happened last night. Mail was also found drinking in public during the day during the fasting month. Cikgu Jasmin also entered the class and discussed the reasons and benefits of fasting. After the class ended, everyone apologized.
13	7	"Sayang Kak Ros"	"Love Kak Ros"	October 1, 2008
Upin and Ipin insisted Kak Ros and Opah to buy them new clothes for the upcoming Hari Raya, but are disappointed because Kak Ros refuses to buy new clothes. Outside the house, Upin and Ipin discuss the preparations for Raya with their friends. When Fizi shows off her new clothes, Upin and Ipin feel stressed. It turns out that instead of buying, Kak Ros is sewing new clothes for her beloved twins.
14	8	"Ketupat"	"Hari Raya's Dish"	October 2, 2008
Opah invites Upin and Ipin to help weave ketupat with Kak Ros. While weaving, the four of them discuss their friends' preparations for Raya. Upin and Ipin play around with making ketupat in different shapes. Kak Ros scolds them for their wrong method, but is mocked in return for their onion ketupat.
15	9	"Zakat Fitrah"	"Giving Out Money for the Needed"	October 3, 2008
Upin and Ipin reminded Opah to pay zakat fitrah. The three of them rushed to the musolla, but it was empty, so they went to Tok Dalang's house to settle their zakat obligations. Opah handed the zakat money over to him, and from Tok Dalang to Upin. While breaking the fast, Opah told them the purpose of paying zakat fitrah, which was to commemorate the less fortunate during the month of Ramadan.
16	10	"Malam Syahdu"	"A Peaceful Night"	October 4, 2008
It was the last day or Ramadan fasting month, so the taraweeh was replaced by the takbir. Upin and Ipin were playing with fireworks but were interrupted by Kak Ros who told them to prepare a mat. It took them so long to flatten the mat that Kak Ros had to scold them again. Apparently, this mat was used by the villagers to practice the takbir. Tok Dalang invited Upin and Ipin to recite the takbir in the musolla, with Opah's permission.
17	11	"Pagi Raya"	"The Morning of Eid"	October 5, 2008
On the morning of the first day of Shawwal, Upin and Ipin apologized to Opah and Kak Ros. After the morning takbir, they invited their friends to their house to enjoy the Eid meal. During the meal, Mail expressed regret for failing to fulfill his obligation to fast throughout Ramadan, but Opah forgave him as long as he continued to do good throughout the holy month.
18	12	"Berkat"	"Blessings"	October 6, 2008
Upin and Ipin helped deliver food to Tok Dalang's house. At first, Tok Dalang did not want to receive guests, but opened the door as soon as Upin and Ipin said that they brought the dishes that Opah had told him to deliver. Finally, Tok Dalang was caught by all their tricks. Upon arriving there, Tok invited Upin, Ipin and their friends to try his special dish, which was cow-shaped ketupat. After that, he gave duit raya to all the children who were present at his house.

=== Season 3 (2009) ===
The third season, titled Upin & Ipin dan Kawan-Kawan, began premiered on TV9 on 2 February 2009, with each episode lasting up to seven minutes. As a year-long production season, it had frequent in-season breaks and failed by repeats, and also experienced some record changes. In this season, the series left the Saturday midnight prime time slot on TV9. In the year-end school break season, it became apparent that new episodes are strangely debuted on school holidays, with new episodes premiering on Mondays, Tuesdays and Wednesdays, 5.30 am (repeats for the rest of the week) throughout the six-week holiday season. This is also the first season of Upin & Ipin for the international market, airing on Disney Channel Asia beginning 15 November 2009 with dubs in English (the official dub, as the credits and episode titles are in English).

No. overall	No. in season	Title	English title	Original release date
19 20	1 2	"Air Kolah, Air Laut"	"The Rain and Seven Seas"	February 2, 2009 February 3, 2009
Tired of staying indoors while the rains heavily outside, Upin and Ipin eventually find some fun in the bathroom by playing with ships on the choppy water while imagining themselves as Hang Upin and Hang Ipin, who saved Princess Mei Mei from being held captive by Captain Jarjit Singh the pirate in the middle of the sea.: This episode served as a story setting episode for "Kembara Ke Pulau Harta Karun".
21 22	3 4	"Basikal Baru"	"The Brand New Bicycles"	February 4, 2009 February 9, 2009
Mail, Ehsan and Mei Mei shows their brand new bicycles to Upin and Ipin. This makes the twin brothers desired to having the new bicycles.
23 24	5 6	"Berkebun"	"Let's Gardening"	February 10, 2009 February 11, 2009
Upin and Ipin began to know the benefits of gardening and having curious with the insects within their orchards, including snails and caterpillars.
25 26 27	7 8 9	"Gosok, Jangan Tak Gosok"	"Brush It"	March 16, 2009 March 17, 2009 March 18, 2009
At the Tadika Mesra, Upin and Ipin and their friends began to learn how to care for their teeth.
28 29	10 11	"Kisah Dua Malam"	"A Tale of the Two Nights"	May 14, 2009 May 15, 2009
Upin and Ipin and their friends started talking about the ghostly threats at the night. Kak Ros reminds her twins about a "haunted" leaning coconut tree.
30 31 32	12 13 14	"Kembara Ke Pulau Harta Karun (Bahagian 1–3)"	"Journey to the Treasure Island" (Parts 1–3)	May 16, 2009 May 21, 2009 May 22, 2009
Upin and Ipin and their friends imagined themselves in a treasure island and saves it from pirate threats.: This is the first long-form episode of Upin & Ipin, having 11 parts.
33 34	15 16	"Istimewa Hari Ibu"	"Mother's Day Special"	May 23, 2009 September 7, 2009
35 36	17 18	"Kami 1Malaysia"	"We are 1Malaysia"	September 8, 2009 September 9, 2009
37 38 39	19 20 21	"Seronoknya Membaca"	"Reading is Fun"	September 21, 2009 September 22, 2009 September 23, 2009
40 41	22 23	"Berpuasa Bersama Kawan Baru"	"Fasting with New Friend"	September 24, 2009 September 25, 2009
42	24	"Selamat Menyambut Lebaran"	"Happy Eid-ul-Fitr"	September 26, 2009
43 44	25 26	"Upin, Ipin dan Apin"	"Upin, Ipin and Apin"	November 23, 2009 November 24, 2009
45 46 47	27 28 29	"Jejak Rembo"	"Rembo's Trail"	November 25, 2009 November 30, 2009 December 1, 2009
48 49	30 31	"Diri Bersih, Badan Sihat"	"Keep Clean, Stay Healthy"	December 2, 2009 December 7, 2009
50 51 52	32 33 34	"Kembara Ke Pulau Harta Karun (Bahagian 4–6)"	"Journey to the Treasure Island" (Parts 4–6)	December 8, 2009 December 9, 2009 December 14, 2009
53 54 55 56	35 36 37 38	"Ambil Galah Tolong Tunjukkan"	"A Fruitful Day"	December 15, 2009 December 16, 2009 December 21, 2009 December 22, 2009
57 58	39 40	"Sapy Oh Sapy"	"Sapy O Sapy"	December 23, 2009 December 28, 2009
59 60	41 42	"Kembara Ke Pulau Harta Karun (Bahagian 7–8) (Note: Left as a cliffhanger and to be continued in season 6.)"	"Journey to the Treasure Island" (Parts 7–8)	December 29, 2009 December 30, 2009

=== Season 4 (2010) ===
The fourth season debuted on TV9 on 15 March 2010, with a brand new opening sequence and color pencil and exercise book-themed title card. The main focus on this season is as a tribute to sports, as it was developed in a year full of sport events.

No. overall	No. in season	Title	English title	Original release date
61 62 63	1 2 3	"Juara Kampung"	"The Village Champion"	March 15, 2010 March 16, 2010 March 17, 2010
64 65 66 67 68 69	4 5 6 7 8 9	"Anak Harimau"	"Tiger Cubs"	June 7, 2010 June 8, 2010 June 9, 2010 June 14, 2010 June 15, 2010 June 16, 2010
70 71 72 73 74 75	10 11 12 13 14 15	"Ramadhan Kembali Lagi"	"Ramadhan is Here Again"	August 11, 2010 August 12, 2010 August 13, 2010 August 14, 2010 August 15, 2010 August 16, 2010
76 77 78	16 17 18	"Menjelang Syawal"	"Almost Syawal"	September 10, 2010
79 80 81	19 20 21	"Bila Besar Nanti"	"When I Grow Up"	September 10, 2010
82 83 84	22 23 24	"Rasa Sayang"	"Picnicking"	November 15, 2010 November 16, 2010 November 17, 2010
85 86 87	25 26 27	"Kisah Raja Pemburu"	"The Hunter King"	November 22, 2010 November 23, 2010 November 24, 2010
88 89 90	28 29 30	"Kisah Pisang & Cengkerang"	"Bananas & Shells"	November 29, 2010 November 30, 2010 December 1, 2010
91 92 93	31 32 33	"Kenangan Manis"	"Sweet Memories"	December 6, 2010 December 7, 2010 December 8, 2010
94 95 96	34 35 36	"Lama Tapi Berharga"	"Old is Gold"	December 13, 2010 December 14, 2010 December 15, 2010
97 98 99 100 101 102	37 38 39 40 41 42	"Demi Metromillenium"	"For Metromillenium"	December 20, 2010 December 21, 2010 December 22, 2010 December 27, 2010 December 28, 2010 December 29, 2010

=== Season 5 (2011) ===
The fifth season first aired on TV9 on 12 March 2011 with a new sequence, now based on a papercraft theme. This season airs every Saturday at 7:30 pm to 9:30 am.

No. overall	No. in season	Title	English title	Original release date
103 104 105	1 2 3	"Belajar Lagi..?"	"Back to School..?"	March 12, 2011
106 107 108	4 5 6	"Terbang Tinggi-Tinggi"	"Flying High"	June 4, 2011
109 110 111	7 8 9	"Tersentuh Hati"	"Heart Touched"	June 11, 2011
112 113 114	10 11 12	"Ikhlas Dari Hati"	"From the Heart"	August 6, 2011
115 116 117	13 14 15	"Kuih Untuk Opah"	"Cookies for Opah"	August 13, 2011
118 119 120	16 17 18	"Rindu Opah"	"We Miss You, Opah"	August 30, 2011
121 122 123	19 20 21	"Sakit Ke?"	"Does it Hurt?"	September 10, 2011
124 125 126	22 23 24	"Garang Ke Sayang?"	"Scare or Care?"	November 19, 2011
127 128 129	25 26 27	"Sedia... Mula!"	"Ready... Go!"	November 26, 2011
130 131 132	28 29 30	"Gelapnya..."	"It's So Dark..."	December 3, 2011
133 134 135	31 32 33	"Jari Jemari Salleh"	"Wedding Planning Sunday"	December 10, 2011
136 137 138	34 35 36	"Cerita Kami"	"Our Stories"	December 17, 2011
139 140 141 142 143 144	37 38 39 40 41 42	"Metrobot, Bergabung!"	"Metrobot, Combine!"	December 24, 2011 December 31, 2011

=== Season 6 (2012) ===
The sixth season aired every Sunday at 6 pm on TV9. This also features a retirement of a character. Cikgu Jasmin started being a teacher for 3 years. Cikgu Jasmin retires and continue her studies in Kuala Lumpur. She was replaced by Cikgu Melati from this season onwards.

No. overall	No. in season	Title	English title	Original release date
145 146 147	1 2 3	"Mainan Baru"	"New Toys"	March 18, 2012
148 149 150	4 5 6	"Kembara Ke Pulau Harta Karun (Bahagian 9–11) (Note: Continuation from a cliffhanger left in season 3.)"	"Journey to the Treasure Island" (Parts 9–11)	June 10, 2012
151 152 153	7 8 9	"Tangkap Dia"	"Catch It"	June 17, 2012
154 155 156	10 11 12	"Kembara Kecil-Kecilan"	"Little Adventure"	July 22, 2012
157 158 159	13 14 15	"Terima Kasih Cikgu!"	"Thank You Teacher!"	July 29, 2012
160 161 162	16 17 18	"Iqra'"	"Iqra'"	August 12, 2012
163 164 165	19 20 21	"Rasai Kemenangan"	"Feel the Victory"	August 19, 2012
166 167 168	22 23 24	"Bulan Hantu"	"Ghost Night"	August 26, 2012
169 170 171	25 26 27	"Hari Misteri"	"A Mysterious Day"	September 23, 2012
172 173 174	28 29 30	"Raja Buah"	"The King of Fruits"	November 18, 2012
175 176 177	31 32 33	"Cari dan Simpan"	"Find & Save"	November 25, 2012
178 179 180	34 35 36	"Kenangan Mengusik Jiwa"	"Heart Touching Memories"	December 16, 2012
181 182 183	37 38 39	"Taman Mesra"	"A Friendly Garden"	December 23, 2012
184 185 186	40 41 42	"Sedia Menyelamat"	"Ready for Action"	December 30, 2012

=== Season 7 (2013) ===
Upin and Ipin will start their fun story with the Chinese New Year story featuring a Chinese girl, Mei Mei, as the seventh season's premier. The episodes air on Saturday evenings at 6:30 pm. The first episode was scheduled to air on 2 March 2013, but due to technical problems the first episode have been pushed to 9 March 2013.

No. overall	No. in season	Title	English title	Original release date
187 188 189	1 2 3	"Gong Xi Fa Cai"	"Happy Chinese New Year"	March 9, 2013
190 191 192	4 5 6	"Gigi Susu"	"Baby Teeth"	April 27, 2013
193 194 195	7 8 9	"Nenek Si Bongkok Tiga"	"The Old Hope"	June 1, 2013
196 197 198	10 11 12	"Usahawan Muda"	"Little Businessman"	June 8, 2013
199 200 201	13 14 15	"Sahabat Selamanya"	"Friends Forever"	July 13, 2013
202 203 204	16 17 18	"Dugaan Ramadhan"	"Challengers Does Bushes"	July 27, 2013
205 206 207	19 20 21	"Riang Raya"	"Winning is Fun"	August 8, 2013
208 209 210	22 23 24	"Daun Hijau"	"Green Leaf"	September 14, 2013
211 212 213	25 26 27	"Barang Silam"	"Antiques"	October 12, 2013
214 215 216	28 29 30	"Bahaya Jerebu"	"The Haze Hazards"	October 26, 2013
217 218 219	31 32 33	"Pim Pim Pom"	"Pim Pim Pom"	November 16, 2013
220 221 222	34 35 36	"Kembara Kembar Nakal"	"The Twin's Little Mischievous Adventures"	November 30, 2013
223 224 225	37 38 39	"Beli, Pakai, Suka"	"Buy, Wear, Love It"	December 14, 2013
226 227 228	40 41 42	"Boria Suka-Suka"	"Fun & Boring"	December 28, 2013

=== Season 8 (2014) ===
The eighth season started airing on 30 May 2014. The episodes air on the days when new episodes appear in three separate parts on a seven-minute slot at 5:30 pm during the school holidays. Starting from this season onwards it is produced in high-definition resolution where the HD versions of each episode in this season will appear on the DVD collection once it is released. TV9 airs the episodes in PAL format.

The character designs are also remodelled and improved to make them more lively. A new voice actress for Ros has been introduced. Season 8 also introduced a crossover with the Ultra Series Franchise in Episode 9, which is co-produced by Tsuburaya Productions.

No. overall	No. in season	Title	English title	Original release date
229 230 231	1 2 3	"Upin & Ipin Kesayanganku"	"My Lovely Upin & Ipin"	May 30, 2014 May 31, 2014 June 1, 2014
232 233 234	4 5 6	"Kail dan Laga"	"Fighting & Fishing"	June 2, 2014 June 3, 2014 June 4, 2014
235 236 237	7 8 9	"Belajar Sambil Main"	"Play and Learn"	June 5, 2014 June 6, 2014 June 7, 2014
238 239 240	10 11 12	"Cuai, Cuai, Cuai"	"Careless, Careless, Careless"	June 8, 2014 June 9, 2014 June 10, 2014
241 242 243	13 14 15	"Pengalaman Puasa"	"Fasting Experience"	June 29, 2014
244 245 246	16 17 18	"Raya Yang Bermakna"	"The Meaningful Eid"	July 28, 2014 July 29, 2014 July 30, 2014
247 248 249	19 20 21	"Warna Warni"	"Colourful"	September 13, 2014 September 15, 2014 September 16, 2014
250 251 252	22 23 24	"Jaga dan Hargai Mata"	"Care for Your Eyes"	September 18, 2014 September 19, 2014 September 20, 2014
253 254 255	25 26 27	"Upin, Ipin dan Ultraman Ribut"	"Upin, Ipin and Ultraman Ribut"	November 14, 2014 November 15, 2014 November 16, 2014
256 257 258	28 29 30	"Upin & Ipin: Angkasa"	"Upin & Ipin in Space"	December 11, 2014 December 12, 2014 December 13, 2014
259 260 261	31 32 33	"Hasil Tempatan"	"Locally Produce"	December 14, 2014 December 15, 2014 December 16, 2014
262 263 264	34 35 36	"Perangi Rasuah"	"Fight Corruption"	December 17, 2014 December 18, 2014 December 19, 2014
265 266 267	37 38 39	"Terompah Opah"	"Opah's Stump"	December 20, 2014 December 21, 2014 December 22, 2014
268 269 270	40 41 42	"Pokok Seribu Guna"	"Trees of Thousand Uses"	December 23, 2014 December 24, 2014 December 25, 2014

=== Season 9 (2015–2016) ===
No. overall	No. in season	Title	English title	Original release date
271 272 273	1 2 3	"Cip Cip Cip"	"Chirp Chirp Chirp"	March 20, 2015 March 21, 2015 March 22, 2015
274 275 276	4 5 6	"Jambatan Ilmu"	"The Key of Knowledge"	May 15, 2015 May 16, 2015 May 17, 2015
277 278 279	7 8 9	"Sahabat Pena"	"Pen Pals"	June 5, 2015 June 6, 2015 June 7, 2015
280 281 282	10 11 12	"Dah Bocor?"	"Is It Leaking?"	June 12, 2015 June 13, 2015 June 14, 2015
283 284 285	13 14 15	"Al-Kisah Malam Puasa"	"The Ramadhan Night Story"	June 19, 2015 June 20, 2015 June 21, 2015
286 287 288	16 17 18	"Al-Kisah Hari Raya"	"The Eid-ul-Fitr Story"	July 17, 2015
289 290 291	19 20 21	"Isi Masa Lapang"	"Fill Up Free Time"	August 29, 2015 August 30, 2015 August 31, 2015
292 293 294	22 23 24	"Siang Tidur Malam Berjaga"	"Asleep at Day, Awake by Night"	September 18, 2015 September 19, 2015 September 20, 2015
295 296 297	25 26 27	"Skuad Bebas Denggi"	"The Dengue Free Squad"	September 25, 2015 September 26, 2015 September 27, 2015
298 299 300	28 29 30	"Ultraman Ribut II"	"Ultraman Ribut II"	November 13, 2015 November 14, 2015 November 15, 2015
301 302 303	31 32 33	"Dulu dan Sekarang"	"Then and Now"	December 4, 2015 December 5, 2015 December 6, 2015
304 305 306	34 35 36	"Siapa Yang Ambil?"	"Who's Take It?"	December 18, 2015 December 19, 2015 December 20, 2015
307 308 309	37 38 39	"Kedai Makan Upin & Ipin"	"Upin & Ipin Food Stall"	December 25, 2015 December 26, 2015 December 27, 2015
310 311 312	40 41 42	"Siapa Atan?"	"Who is Atan?"	January 1, 2016

=== Season 10 (2016) ===
No. overall	No. in season	Title	English title	Original release date
313 314 315	1 2 3	"Pisang Goreng Ngap Ngap!"	"Crunchy Banana Fritters!"	April 9, 2016
316 317 318	4 5 6	"Uuuuu... Telur Apa Tu?"	"Uuuu....What The Strange Egg?"	May 21, 2016
319 320 321	7 8 9	"Kenapa Tak Elak?"	"Why Not You Avoid It?"	June 4, 2016
322 323 324	10 11 12	"Indahnya Ramadhan"	"The Beautiful of Ramadhan"	June 11, 2016
325 326 327	13 14 15	"Indahnya Syawal"	"The Beautiful of Shawwal"	July 6, 2016
328 329 330	16 17 18	"Bila Cuti Sekolah"	"On School Holidays"	September 10, 2016
331 332 333	19 20 21	"Ekosistem"	"The Ecosystems"	September 17, 2016
334 335 336	22 23 24	"Pesta Cahaya"	"The Festival of Lights"	October 29, 2016
337 338 339	25 26 27	"Patuk Kau!"	"Bites and Venom"	November 26, 2016
340 341 342	28 29 30	"Kembara 6 Musim"	"Journey Through 6 Seasons"	December 3, 2016
343 344 345	31 32 33	"Di Sebalik Tabir"	"Behind the Scenes"	December 10, 2016
346 347 348	34 35 36	"Tersilap"	"I Made a Big Mistake"	December 17, 2016
349 350 351	37 38 39	"Aku Sebuah Jam"	"I am a Clock"	December 24, 2016
352 353 354	40 41 42	"Animasi Terakhir"	"The Last Animation"	December 31, 2016

=== Season 11 (2017) ===
The eleventh season premiered on TV9 on 25 March 2017. This is the last season of the series which TV9 hold the broadcasting rights before moved to MNCTV and Astro for the following season. Unlike the previous seasons, the credits in this season are not regular, instead depends on each episodes.

No. overall	No. in season	Title	English title	Original release date
355 356 357	1 2 3	"Kompang Dipalu"	"Rattle Hammered"	March 25, 2017
358 359 360	4 5 6	"Taman Riang Ria"	"Fun Park"	April 29, 2017
361 362 363	7 8 9	"Azam Puasa"	"Fasting"	May 27, 2017
364 365 366	10 11 12	"Ragam Raya"	"Eid Variety"	June 25, 2017
367 368 369	13 14 15	"Jom Hidup Sihat!"	"Let's Live Healthy!"	July 29, 2017
370 371 372	16 17 18	"Hapuskan Virus!"	"Destroy the Virus!"	August 26, 2017
373 374 375	19 20 21	"Amal Jariah"	"Charity"	September 2, 2017
376 377 378	22 23 24	"Kembara Alam Dino"	"Dinosaur's Nature Adventures"	September 16, 2017
379 380 381	25 26 27	"Magik Pin Pin Pom"	"Pin Pin Pom Magic"	November 25, 2017
382 383 384	28 29 30	"Pesta Pantun"	"Poetry Festival"	December 2, 2017
385 386 387	31 32 33	"Selamatkan Neo Santara"	"Save Neo Santara"	December 9, 2017
388 389 390	34 35 36	"Terlajak Laris"	"Best Seller"	December 16, 2017
391 392 393	37 38 39	"Masih Ada Sayang"	"Still Have a Love"	December 23, 2017
394 395 396	40 41 42	"Teroka Lautan"	"Exploring the Oceans"	December 30, 2017

=== Season 12 (2018–2019) ===
The twelfth season premiered on 23 May 2018 on MNCTV. This is the first season of the series of which MNCTV acquired the official broadcasting rights for Upin & Ipin, resulting Malaysia lost its privilege to hold the broadcasting rights for the series. However, Astro had acquired the broadcasting rights for Upin & Ipin after an agreement between Astro and Les' Copaque Production was signed in November 2018, replacing TV9 who holds the broadcasting rights on the series for 11 seasons. This season saws the improved quality of lighting as well as the shadow and the texture of the characters.

No. overall	No. in season	Title	English title	Original release date
397 398 399	1 2 3	"Masak-Masak"	"Cooking"	May 23, 2018
400 401 402	4 5 6	"Alunan Ramadhan"	"The Tunes of Ramadhan"	May 23, 2018
403 404 405	7 8 9	"Sinar Syawal"	"The Lights of Shawwal"	June 15, 2018
406 407 408	10 11 12	"Idola Misteri"	"The Mystery Idol"	August 9, 2018
409 410 411	13 14 15	"Mana Rembo?"	"Where's Rembo?"	August 22, 2018
412 413 414	16 17 18	"Untuk Prestasi"	"For Performance"	September 1, 2018
415 416 417	19 20 21	"Ngantuknya..."	"So Sleepy..."	September 5, 2018
418 419 420	22 23 24	"Tanya Sama Pokok"	"Talking to the Tree"	October 19, 2018
421 422 423	25 26 27	"Pensel Ajaib"	"The Magic Pencil"	October 20, 2018
424 425 426	28 29 30	"Zoo Sayang"	"Lovely Zoo"	November 23, 2018
427 428 429	31 32 33	"Kain Perca"	"Patchwork"	November 29, 2018
430 431 432	34 35 36	"Aku Sebuah Buku"	"I am a Book"	December 15, 2018
433 434 435	37 38 39	"Apa Benda Tu?"	"What is That Thing?"	January 1, 2019
436 437 438	40 41 42	"Upin dan Ipin Dah Besar?"	"Upin and Ipin Become Grow Up?"	January 5, 2019

=== Season 13 (2019) ===
The thirteenth season premiered on both Astro Prima and Astro Ceria on 20 April 2019. Starting with this season, Astro holds the broadcasting rights for the series, replacing Media Prima through TV9 which holds the broadcasting rights for 10 years. Two Ramadhan and Shawwal episodes were separated from regular Upin & Ipin episodes, namely "Mulanya Ramadhan" and "Tibanya Syawal". Both episodes were divided into two separate segments named Upin & Ipin Ramadhan and Upin & Ipin Syawal.

No. overall	No. in season	Title	English title	Original release date
439 440 441	1 2 3	"Si Merah"	"The Red Bird"	April 20, 2019
442 443 444	4 5 6	"Mulanya Ramadhan"	"The Beginning of Ramadhan"	May 6, 2019
445 446 447	7 8 9	"Tibanya Syawal"	"The Arrival of Shawwal"	June 5, 2019
448 449 450	10 11 12	"Ehsan Pindah?"	"Ehsan Moves?"	July 10, 2019
451 452 453	13 14 15	"Bijak Sifir"	"Mathematics Calculate Multiplication"	August 8, 2019
454 455 456	16 17 18	"Tiga Hajat"	"The Three Wishes"	August 26, 2019
457 458 459	19 20 21	"Bela Berudu"	"Inside the Tadpoles"	September 1, 2019
460 461 462	22 23 24	"Pin Pin Pom Delima Sakti"	"Pin Pin Pom Magical Pomegranate"	October 19, 2019
463 464 465	25 26 27	"Medal Larian"	"Running Medal"	October 20, 2019
466 467 468	28 29 30	"Bila Hujan Turun"	"When it Rains"	October 29, 2019
469 470 471	31 32 33	"Perut Ehsan"	"Ehsan's Stomach"	November 19, 2019
472 473 474	34 35 36	"Aku Sebatang Pensel"	"I am a Pencil"	December 24, 2019
475 476 477	37 38 39	"Opah Merajuk"	"Opah Sulks"	December 25, 2019
478 479 480	40 41 42	"Kawan-Kawan Hilang"	"Lost Friends"	December 26, 2019

=== Season 14 (2020–2021) ===
No. overall	No. in season	Title	English title	Original release date
481 482 483	1 2 3	"Ragam Ramadhan"	"Ramadhan Variety"	May 1, 2020
484 485 486	4 5 6	"Filem Upin & Ipin"	"Upin & Ipin Movies"	May 16, 2020
487	7	"Syahdunya Syawal"	"The Tunes of Shawwal"	May 24, 2020
488 489	8 9	"Perintah Kawalan Pergerakan"	"Movement Control Order"	July 15, 2020
490 491 492	10 11 12	"Kawan Baik Upin & Ipin"	"Upin & Ipin's Best Friends"	August 12, 2020
493 494 495	13 14 15	"Dayung Laju-Laju"	"Swinging"	September 18, 2020
496 497 498	16 17 18	"Pertolongan Cemas"	"First Aid"	October 24, 2020
499 500 501	19 20 21	"Tudung Saji Mengkuang"	"Mengkuang Serving Cover"	November 26, 2020
502 503 504	22 23 24	"Barang Baik, Barang Kita"	"A Good Item is Our Products"	December 1, 2020
505 506 507	25 26 27	"Penjaga Baru"	"The New Keepers"	December 25, 2020
508 509 510	28 29 30	"Neo Santara: Demam Karat"	"Neo Santara: The Rust Fever"	January 1, 2021
511 512 513	31 32 33	"Perang Nyamuk"	"Mosquito Wars"	January 18, 2021
514 515 516	34 35 36	"Buku Nota Jarjit"	"Jarjit's Notebook"	February 5, 2021
517 518 519	37 38 39	"Tumbuh Rambut"	"The Hair's Grown Up"	February 17, 2021
520 521 522	40 41 42	"Kain Merah Ipin"	"Ipin's Red Cloth"	March 15, 2021

=== Season 15 (2021–2022) ===
No. overall	No. in season	Title	English title	Original release date
523 524 525	1 2 3	"Dugaan Puasa"	"The Challenges of Fasting"	April 13, 2021
526 527 528	4 5 6	"Raya Penuh Makna"	"An Eid Full of Meaning"	May 13, 2021
529 530 531	7 8 9	"Setem Yang Hilang"	"The Lost Stamps"	June 16, 2021
532 533 534	10 11 12	"Pondok Kita"	"Our Huts"	August 17, 2021
535 536 537	13 14 15	"Aku Sebuah Kereta"	"I am a Car"	September 7, 2021
538 539 540	16 17 18	"Juara Karaoke"	"The Karaoke Champion"	October 20, 2021
541 542 543	19 20 21	"Helang Merah"	"The Red Eagle"	November 1, 2021
544 545 546	22 23 24	"Rajin Menyimpan, Bijak Belanja"	"Keep Saving, Spent Wisely"	November 19, 2021
547 548 549	25 26 27	"Angin"	"The Wind"	December 13, 2021
550 551 552	28 29 30	"Tamak Selalu Rugi"	"Those Who Greedy, Always Loss"	December 20, 2021
553 554 555	31 32 33	"Ais Kepal"	"Ice Balls"	December 31, 2021
556 557 558	34 35 36	"Pin Pin Pom Naga Sakti"	"Pin Pin Pom Magical Dragon"	January 31, 2022
559 560 561	37 38 39	"Gerobok Rezeki"	"Abundance"	February 16, 2022
562 563 564	40 41 42	"Muzikal Kampung Durian Runtuh"	"Kampung Durian Runtuh Musical"	March 29, 2022

=== Season 16 (2022–2023) ===
No. overall	No. in season	Title	English title	Original release date
565 566 567	1 2 3	"Puasa Norma Baharu"	"New Norms of Fasting"	April 3, 2022
568 569 570	4 5 6	"Raya Norma Baharu"	"New Norms of Eid"	May 2, 2022
571 572 573	7 8 9	"Mimpi Terindah"	"A Beautiful Dream"	June 20, 2022
574 575 576	10 11 12	"Lindung Diri dan Keluarga"	"Protect Yourself and Your Family"	July 28, 2022
577 578 579	13 14 15	"Angsa Putih"	"White Goose"	August 23, 2022
580 581 582	16 17 18	"Mencari Idola"	"Looking for the Idol"	October 14, 2022
583 584 585	19 20 21	"Motor Kapcai"	"Old Motorbikes"	October 22, 2022
586 587 588	22 23 24	"Rasa Sayang"	"Feel Love"	November 17, 2022
589 590 591	25 26 27	"Temanku Susanti"	"My Friend Susanti"	December 19, 2022
592 593 594	28 29 30	"Lembaga Hitam"	"Black Ghost"	January 2, 2023
595 596 597	31 32 33	"Keselamatan dan Kecekapan Tenaga"	"Energy Safety and Efficiency"	February 11, 2023
598 599 600	34 35 36	"Hidup Bergaya"	"Looks Casual"	February 21, 2023
601 602 603	37 38 39	"Kartunis Lagenda"	"The Legendary Cartoonist"	March 15, 2023
604 605 606	40 41 42	"Penghuni Hutan"	"Forest's Residence"	April 3, 2023

=== Season 17 (2023–2024) ===
No. overall	No. in season	Title	English title	Original release date
607 608 609	1 2 3	"Ibadah Puasa"	"Of Fasting"	April 17, 2023
610 611 612	4 5 6	"Irama Raya"	"The Rhythm of Eid"	April 22, 2023
613 614 615	7 8 9	"Kopi, Teh dan Susu"	"Coffee, Tea and Milk"	June 13, 2023
616 617 618	10 11 12	"Perginya Rembo"	"Rembo is No More"	July 10, 2023
619 620 621	13 14 15	"Dapur Masak-Masak"	"Cooking Kitchen"	August 7, 2023
622 623 624	16 17 18	"Abang atau Kakak"	"Brother or Sister"	September 12, 2023
625 626 627	19 20 21	"Neo Santara Wirabot"	"Neo Santara Wirabot"	October 21, 2023
628 629 630	22 23 24	"Penyepit Kayu"	"Wooden Chopsticks"	November 3, 2023
631 632 633	25 26 27	"Cucu Kesayangan Opah"	"Opah's Beloved Grandchildren"	November 10, 2023
634 635 636	28 29 30	"Cermin Misteri"	"The Mysterious Mirror"	December 2, 2023
637 638 639	31 32 33	"Kenderaan Kecemasan"	"Emergency Vehicle"	December 13, 2023
640 641 642	34 35 36	"Secebis Kenangan Abah"	"A Pieces of Father's Memory"	December 15, 2023
643 644 645	37 38 39	"Rumah Hijau Opah"	"Opah's Green House"	January 1, 2024
646 647 648	40 41 42	"Air Bersih, Air Selamat"	"A Clean Water is a Safe Water"	March 15, 2024

=== Season 18 (2024–2025) ===
No. overall	No. in season	Title	English title	Original release date
649 650 651	1 2 3	"Ramadan Diberkati"	"The Abundance of Ramadhan"	March 15, 2024
652 653 654	4 5 6	"Ketupat Aidilfitri"	"Eid-ul-Fitr's Rice Cake"	April 10, 2024
655 656 657	7 8 9	"Basikal Kawanku"	"Bicycle is My Friend"	May 14, 2024
658 659 660	10 11 12	"Gunting Rambut"	"Haircut"	June 13, 2024
661 662 663	13 14 15	"Minyak Sawit"	"Palm Oil"	July 20, 2024
664 665 666	16 17 18	"Kolam Renang"	"Swimming Pool"	July 25, 2024
667 668 669	19 20 21	"Duit Simpanan"	"Savings"	August 24, 2024
670 671 672	22 23 24	"Mencari Pepatung"	"Finding Dragonflies"	September 7, 2024
673 674 675	25 26 27	"Pin Pin Pom: Pertarungan Terakhir"	"Pin Pin Pom: Last Battle"	October 10, 2024
676 677 678	28 29 30	"Rembosaur"	"Rembosaur"	October 21, 2024
679 680 681	31 32 33	"Anak Pokok"	"Saplings"	November 13, 2024
682 683 684	34 35 36	"Hantu"	"Ghosts"	December 6, 2024
685 686 687	37 38 39	"Budak Surat Khabar"	"Paperboy"	December 19, 2024
688 689 690	40 41 42	"Cik Bidadari"	"Angel Lady"	January 1, 2025

=== Season 19 (2025–2026) ===
No. overall	No. in season	Title	English title	Original release date
691 692 693	1 2 3	"Kuih Ramadan"	"Ramadan Cookies"	March 4, 2025
694 695 696	4 5 6	"Bahagianya Raya"	"The Happiness of Eid"	March 31, 2025
697 698 699	7 8 9	"Penghibur Jalanan"	"Street Performers"	May 6, 2025
700 701 702	10 11 12	"ABCD Ori"	"ABCD Ori"	May 27, 2025
703 704 705	13 14 15	"Pokok Kenangan"	"Tree of Memories"	June 25, 2025
706 707 708	16 17 18	"Kisah Badut"	"Clown Story"	September 22, 2025
709 710 711	19 20 21	"Wira Minyak Sawit"	"Palm Oil Hero"	September 27, 2025
712 713 714	22 23 24	"Detektif Rembo"	"Detective Rembo"	October 20, 2025
715 716 717	25 26 27	"Kelab Susu Ceria"	"The Joy Milk Club"	November 28, 2025
178 719 720	28 29 30	"Gulai Kemahang"	"Gulai Kemahang"	December 12, 2025
721 722 723	31 32 33	"Polis Sentri"	"Police Entry"	January 10, 2026
724 725 726	34 35 36	"Cahaya Kelip-kelip"	"Fireflies"	January 23, 2026
727 728 729	37 38 39	"Kruk Krak Snek Sedap"	"Crunchy and Delicious Snacks"	February 19, 2026
730 731 732	40 41 42	"Sahabat Baik Abah"	"A Father's Best Friend"	February 27, 2026

=== Season 20 (2026) ===
No. overall	No. in season	Title	English title	Original release date
733 734 735	1 2 3	"Pelita Panjut"	"Flashlight"	March 12, 2026
736 737 738	4 5 6	"Raya Lain Macam"	"Different Eid"	March 22, 2026
739 740 741	7 8 9	"Aku Ada Nilai"	"I Have a Value"	April 25, 2026
742 743 744	10 11 12	"Kembara Sambil Belajar"	"Adventure While Learning"	June 20, 2026
745 746 747	13 14 15	"Minyak Sawit Luar Biasa"	"Wonderful Palm Oil"	July 11, 2026
748 749 750	16 17 18	"Ayam Goreng Mail Mendunia"	"Mail's Fried Chicken Goes Worldwide"	July 25, 2026
751 752 753	19 20 21	"Kasut Batik"	"Batik Shoes"	August 7, 2026
754 755 756	22 23 24	"Jeruk"	"Pickled Fruit"	August 29, 2026
757 758 759	25 26 27	"Ketam Nipah"	"Mud Crab"	October 3, 2026

== Home video ==
Upin & Ipin was released on DVD and VCD and distributed in Malaysia by Music Valley from volumes 1–6 and from volume 12 to 29, and by Sony Music Malaysia from volume 7 to 11. From volume 30 onwards, Upin & Ipin DVDs were distributed by Rusa Music.

Season 1
Title	Year	Episode list
Upin & Ipin Vol. 1	2007	Esok Puasa; Dugaan; Nikmat; Terawih; Esok Raya; Hari Raya
Season 2
Title	Year	Episode list
Upin & Ipin: Setahun Kemudian Vol. 2	2008	Tadika; Anak Bulan; Adat; Tamak; Lailatul Qadr; Kisah & Tauladan
Upin & Ipin: Setahun Kemudian Vol. 3	2008	Sayang Kak Ros; Ketupat; Zakat Fitrah; Malam Syahdu; Pagi Raya; Berkat
Season 3
Title	Year	Episode list
Upin & Ipin dan Kawan-Kawan Vol. 4	2009	Air Kolah, Air Laut; Berkebun
Upin & Ipin dan Kawan-Kawan Vol. 5	2009	Basikal Baru; Gosok Jangan Tak Gosok (Part 1 & 2)
Upin & Ipin dan Kawan-Kawan Vol. 6	2009	Gosok Jangan Tak Gosok (Part 3); Kisah Dua Malam; Kembara ke Pulau Harta Karun (Part 1, 2, 3)
Upin & Ipin dan Kawan-Kawan Vol. 7	2010	Istimewa Hari Ibu; Upin, Ipin dan Apin; Kami 1Malaysia
Upin & Ipin dan Kawan-Kawan Vol. 8	2010	Seronoknya Membaca; Berpuasa Bersama Kawan Baru; Selamat Menyambut Lebaran
Upin & Ipin dan Kawan-Kawan Vol. 9	2010	Jejak Rembo; Diri Bersih, Badan Sihat; Kembara ke Pulau Harta Karun (Part 4 & 5)
Upin & Ipin dan Kawan-Kawan Vol. 10	2010	Sapy Oh Sapy; Kembara ke Pulau Harta Karun (Part 6, 7, 8)
Upin & Ipin dan Kawan-Kawan Vol. 11	2010	Ambil Galah Tolong Tunjukkan
Season 4
Title	Year	Episode list
Upin & Ipin dan Kawan-Kawan Vol. 12	2011	Jaguh Kampung; Bila Besar Nanti
Upin & Ipin dan Kawan-Kawan Vol. 13	2011	Anak Harimau
Upin & Ipin dan Kawan-Kawan Vol. 14	2011	Kisah Pisang dan Cangkerang; Kenangan Manis
Upin & Ipin dan Kawan-Kawan Vol. 15	2012	Lama Tapi Berharga; Rasa Sayang
Upin & Ipin dan Kawan-Kawan Vol. 16	2012	Ramadhan Kembali Lagi
Upin & Ipin dan Kawan-Kawan Vol. 17	2012	Menjelang Syawal; Kisah Raja Pemburu
Upin & Ipin dan Kawan-Kawan Vol. 18	2012	Demi Metromillenium
Season 5
Title	Year	Episode list
Upin & Ipin dan Kawan-Kawan Vol. 19	2012	Belajar Lagi?; Terbang Tinggi-Tinggi
Upin & Ipin dan Kawan-Kawan Vol. 20	2012	Tersentuh Hati; Ikhlas dari Hati
Upin & Ipin dan Kawan-Kawan Vol. 21	2012	Kuih untuk Opah; Rindu Opah
Upin & Ipin dan Kawan-Kawan Vol. 22	2012	Garang ke Sayang?; Sakit Ke?
Upin & Ipin dan Kawan-Kawan Vol. 23	2012	Gelapnya...; Sedia... Mula!
Upin & Ipin dan Kawan-Kawan Vol. 24	2012	Metrobot, Bergabung!
Upin & Ipin dan Kawan-Kawan Vol. 25	2013	Jari Jemari Salleh; Cerita Kami
Season 6
Title	Year	Episode list
Upin & Ipin Musim 6: Special Edition	2013	Kenangan Mengusik Jiwa
Upin & Ipin Musim 6: Vol. 26	2013	Mainan Baru; Kembara ke Pulau Harta Karun (Part 9, 10, 11)
Upin & Ipin Musim 6: Vol. 27	2013	Tangkap Dia; Kembara Kecil-Kecilan
Upin & Ipin Musim 6: Vol. 28	2013	Terima Kasih Cikgu!; Iqra'
Upin & Ipin Musim 6: Vol. 29	2013	Rasai Kemenangan; Bulan Hantu
Upin & Ipin Musim 6: Vol. 30	2013	Hari Misteri; Raja Buah
Upin & Ipin Musim 6: Vol. 31	2014	Cari & Simpan; Taman Mesra
Upin & Ipin Musim 6: Special Edition with BOMBA	align=center| 2014	Sedia Menyelamat
Season 7
Title	Year	Episode list
Upin & Ipin Musim 7: Vol. 32	2014	Gong Xi Fa Cai; Gigi Susu
Upin & Ipin Musim 7: Vol. 33	2014	Dugaan Ramadhan; Riang Raya
Upin & Ipin Musim 7: Vol. 34	2014	Nenek Si Bongkok Tiga; Usahawan Muda
Upin & Ipin Musim 7: Vol. 35	2014	Sahabat Selamanya; Daun Hijau
Upin & Ipin Musim 7: Vol. 36	2014	Barang Silam; Bahaya Jerebu
Upin & Ipin Musim 7: Vol. 37	2014	Pim Pim Pom; Kembara Kembar Nakal
Upin & Ipin Musim 7: Vol. 38	2014	Beli, Pakai, Suka; Boria Suka-Suka
Season 8
Title	Year	Episode list
Upin & Ipin Musim 8: Vol. 39	2015	Upin & Ipin Kesayanganku; Kail dan Laga
Upin & Ipin Musim 8: Vol. 40	2015	Belajar Sambil Main; Cuai, Cuai, Cuai
Upin & Ipin Musim 8: Vol. 41	2015	Pengalaman Puasa; Raya Yang Bermakna
Upin & Ipin Musim 8: Vol. 42	2015	Warna Warni; Jaga & Hargai Mata
Upin & Ipin Special Edition: Ultraman Ribut	2015	Upin, Ipin dan Ultraman Ribut
Upin & Ipin Musim 8: Vol. 43	2015	Upin Ipin Angkasa; Hasil Tempatan
Upin & Ipin Special Edition: SPRM	2015	Perangi Rasuah
Upin & Ipin Musim 8: Vol. 44	2015	Terompah Opah; Pokok Seribu Guna
