= Kuala Lumpur International Film Festival =

Film festival

- Location: Kuala Lumpur, Malaysia
- Founded: 22 April 2001
- Awards: Various awards in different categories
- Festival date: 24–28 November 2010 (as of the provided information)
- Language: Various (International)

Kuala Lumpur International Film Festival is a film festival held in Kuala Lumpur. With the aim to promote the best in Asian cinema as well as unearth new Asian filimmaking talent, the 1st Kuala Lumpur International Film Festival was organized on the International Film Festival Circuit on 22 April 2001.

== KLIFF 2010 ==
Kuala Lumpur International Film Festival (KLIFF) was held at Dataran Merdeka, Kuala Lumpur & Malaysia Tourism Center (MATIC) from 24th until 28 November 2010.

=== The Theme ===
The theme for KLIFF is "Celebrating Cultural Diversity". We believe that to achieve global peace and stability, we must start by learning to appreciate cultural differences and sharing information with one another. Film is one of the most popular and effective mediums to stimulate such positive messages. We hope we will be able to make a significant contribution towards promoting unity and tolerance amongst the people of the world.

=== KLIFF 2010 program / activities ===
- Welcoming Night - KLIFF Symposium - KLIFF Business Matching - Public Film Screening (at selected cinemas) - Malaysian Film Premiere - International Film Premiere - Film Exhibitions - Film Casting - KLIFF 2010 Award Night

== History ==
=== Kuala Lumpur World Film Festival ===
The Kuala Lumpur International Film Festival had its beginnings in February 2003 when the one-off, three-day Kuala Lumpur World Film Festival was organised by the National Film Development Corporation Malaysia, or FINAS. Organised in conjunction with the Non-Aligned Movement Conference being held that year, the theme was "Peace, Harmony, Non-Violence and Non-Discrimination." From 16 to 18 February 2003, KLWFF '03 managed to gather participants from over 40 countries throughout the world and marked the beginning of Kuala Lumpur's involvement in the global film industry.

Carrying similar objectives as Kuala Lumpur World Film Festival 2003, FINAS proposed in 2006 to the Malaysian government to organize an annual film festival named Kuala Lumpur International Film Festival (KLIFF) with a new brand, theme and business approach to benefit filmmakers, producers, creative and technical talents, film students, sponsors, business entities related to the film industry and film enthusiasts throughout the world.

=== 2007 festival ===
With the theme, "Celebrating Cultural Diversity", the inaugural Kuala Lumpur International Film Festival screened 50 films from 18 countries. The competition featured 22 films from the five continents of Asia, Africa, Europe, North America and South America, as well as documentaries, short films and animation. The budget for the film festival was 4 million Malaysian ringgit.

Among the competition entries was one Malaysian film, 1957: Hati Malaya. A non-competition film making its premiere was Long Road to Heaven, an Indonesian film about the 2002 Bali bombings.

The festival was held from 28 November – 2 December 2007 with screenings at the Cathay Cineleisure Mutiara Damansara and the Perdana Awards ceremony at the Putra World Trade Centre.

== Awards ==
=== 2008 ===
- Perdana Award – (BEST OVERALL FILM)Film: A Casa de Alice (Brazil)
- Perdana Award – (BEST AFRICAN CONTINENT AWARD) Film: Divizionz ( South africa / Uganda)
- Perdana Award – (BEST ASIAN CONTINENT AWARD) Film: Captain Abu Raed (Jordan)
- Perdana Award – (BEST EUROPEAN CONTINENT AWARD) Film: Darling (France)
- Perdana Award – (BEST NORTH AMERICA CONTINENT AWARD) Film: Fugitive Pieces (CANADA)
- Perdana Award – (BEST SOUTH AMERICA CONTINENT AWARD) Film: A Casa de Alice (Alice’s House) (Brazil)
- Best Director Award – YES! THAT’S US : Film – Divizionz (South Africa / Uganda)
- Best Actress Award – CARLA RIBAS :Film – A Casa de Alice (Alice’s House) (Brazil)
- Best Actor Award – NADIM SAWALHA :Film – Captain Abu Raed (Jordan)
- Best Cinematography Award – Hai Jiao Qi Hao :Film – Cape No. 7 (Taiwan)
- Best Screenplay Award – Hassan And Morcos (Egypt)
- Best Sound Award – Hamoon And Darya (Iran)
- Best Music Score Award – Divizionz (South Africa / Uganda)
- Best Editing Award – Darling (France)
- Special Jury Award – Wayang (Malaysia)
- Best Animation Film – Memory Loss (Taiwan)
- Best Documentary Film – Muschelsuche Unter Dem Arktischen Eis (Under The Ice) (Canada)
- Best Short Film – G16 G17 (Malaysia)

== Awards ==
=== 2007 ===
Jury members for the competition were U-Wei Haji Saari from Malaysia, Andrew Vial from Australia, Jeff Bollow from New Zealand, Sozo Teruoka from Japan and Tikoy Aguiluz from the Philippines. The awards are as follows:

- Best Film – Sunday in Kigali (Canada)
- Best Actress – Fatou N'Diaye (Sunday in Kigali)
- Best Actor – Adel Emam (The Yacoubian Building, Egypt)
- Best Director – Charles Burnett (The Struggle for Liberation, Namibia)
- Best Screenplay – American Fork (USA)
- Best Score – The Struggle for Liberation (Namibia)
- Best Sound – 1957: Hati Malaya (Malaysia)
- Best Cinematography – Not by Chance (Brazil)
- Best Special Effects (Jury Merit Award) – Transformers (USA)
- Best Editing – Raphael Nadjari (Tehilim)
- Special Jury Award – 1957: Hati Malaya
- Best African Film – The Struggle for Liberation (Namibia)
- Best South American Film – Cyrano Fernandez (Venezuela)
- Best North American Film – Sunday in Kigali (Canada)
- Best European Film – Tehilim (France)
- Best Asian Film – One Summer with You (China)
- Best Documentary – 4 (Australia)
- Best Animation – Upin & Ipin, Les' Copaque Production (Malaysia)
- Best Short Film – Feng (Wind) (Singapore/Australia)
