= Najwa Latif =

Malaysian singer (born 1995)

- نجوى لطيف
- Born: Imratul Najwa binti Abdul Latif; May 23, 1995 (age 30); Batu Pahat, Johor, Malaysia
- Spouse: Akwa Arifin (m. 2022)
- Musical career
- Genres: Pop
- Occupations: Singer, composer, idol
- Instruments: Vocals, guitar
- Years active: 2011–present
- Label: NAR Records

Imratul Najwa binti Abdul Latif (born May 23, 1995), better known by her stage name Najwa Latif, is a Malaysian singer, composer and idol.

She became popular after her first song, "Cinta Muka Buku" (Facebook Love) gained popularity.

== Career ==
Najwa learned how to play guitar in 2009 when she was 14 years old and afterward began writing music for songs with her sister Ika, who wrote the lyrics. In September 2010, Najwa began uploading cover songs to YouTube; the first was a cover of Justin Bieber's "Baby". In March 2011, she was signed to NAR Records and her first official single, "Cinta Muka Buku", was released in June 2011. A pre-release video of the song was uploaded to YouTube. According to Najwa, this single is very meaningful to her, as it marked her first steps into the Malaysian music industry as well as to finally fulfill her dream and ambition of becoming a singer. It was also a gift for her fans who had long-awaited her single and showed their support towards her long before she became an established singer. The official music video of "Cinta Muka Buku" received more than six million views in just over six months and is the most viewed music video in Malaysia. Also, Najwa always writes lyrics and compose songs with her oldest sister, Syafiqa Latif.

In March 2013, Chinese idol singer Wang Leehom (王力宏) invited Najwa Latif to be a special guest at his concert at Genting Highlands in Malaysia. They performed the song "All the Things You Don't Know"(你不知道的事).

In 2013, Najwa became a campaign's ambassador for Colgate's sixth annual “Mari Beramal Bersama Colgate” charity Ramadan campaign in KidZania. This campaign has been made to help raise RM150,000 for 15 orphanages in Malaysia.

On 20 November 2016, Najwa has been nominated as Potential Young Composer Award on MACP's (Music AuthorsCopyright Protection) 27th annual dinner and awards show. It was held at the Royale Chulan, Damansara Hotel.

Besides being a singer, Najwa now becoming one of lecturer in her former university which is in UNITAR.

On 22 March 2018, Najwa released her new single called Jauh.

On 31 July 2019, Najwa released her new single and music video called KLIA acronym for Kau Lupa Itu Aku which mean You Forgot That Was Me.

On June 19, 2020, Najwa released her new single called Tak Kisah Pun (It Doesn't Matter) featuring Akwa Arifin on her official Youtube channel Its Najwa595.

== Personal life ==
Najwa Latif is the third of four siblings and was born in Batu Pahat, Johor, Malaysia. All members of her family are musically talented.

Najwa also did well academically, and achieved 7A 1B in Penilaian Menengah Rendah (PMR) when she was 15 years old. She received her secondary education at Sekolah Menengah Kebangsaan (P) in Temenggong Ibrahim, Batu Pahat, Johor and Sijil Pelajaran Malaysia (SPM), where she achieved 4A. She graduated from UNITAR International University, with Bachelor of English, majoring in Teaching English to speakers of other languages (TESOL) in 2017. She has completed her Master in Teaching English Education as a Second Language (TESL) at University of Malaya (UM) in 2019. Currently, she works as an English lecturer at UNITAR International University while also completing her Doctor of Philosophy (PhD) in Teaching English as a Second Language (TESL) at Universiti Kebangsaan Malaysia (UKM).

== Discography ==
- Najwa Latif (2011)

== Awards and nominations ==
Year	Award	Category	Result
2012	26th Anugerah Juara Lagu	Finalist (Cinta Muka Buku)	Nominated
2012	25th Bintang Popular Berita Harian Awards	Most Popular Female Singer	Nominated
2012	25th Bintang Popular Berita Harian Awards	Most Popular Female New Artist	Nominated
2012	25th Bintang Popular Berita Harian Awards	Most Popular Female Online	Nominated
2012	Anugerah Planet Muzik	Best Vocal Performance In A Song (New Female Artiste)	Nominated
2012	Anugerah Planet Muzik	New Media Icons	Nominated
2013	26th Bintang Popular Berita Harian Awards	Popular Duo / Group Artists "(with Sleeq)"	Nominated
2013	26th Bintang Popular Berita Harian Awards	Most Popular Female Singer	Nominated
2013	26th Bintang Popular Berita Harian Awards	Stailo Female Artist	Nominated
2013	26th Bintang Popular Berita Harian Awards	Influential Artist in Social Media	Nominated
2013	26th Bintang Popular Berita Harian Awards	Most Popular Asian Artist	Nominated
2013	26th Bintang Popular Berita Harian Awards	Best on Screen Chemistry "with SleeQ"	Nominated
2013	Anugerah Planet Muzik	Best Collaboration (with SleeQ & Syamkamarul)	Won
2013	Anugerah Planet Muzik	Most Popular Singapore Song	Won
2013	Anugerah Planet Muzik	Icon Social Media	Nominated
2014	28th Anugerah Juara Lagu	Finalist (Sahabat)	Nominated
2014	27th Bintang Popular Berita Harian Awards	Most Popular Female Singer	Nominated
2016	Komposer Muda Berpotensi MACP	Najwa Latif	Nominated
