= Wivina Belmonte =

UNICEF staff member

Wivina Belmonte is a UNICEF staff member. She is a national of both Spain and Canada, and since 2016 she has been the organisation's Deputy Regional Director for East Asia Pacific.

== Education and early career ==
In 1982, Belmonte completed an undergraduate degree at Carleton University in Ottawa, Canada, having majored in international relations and journalism. She subsequently worked in the London office of the Canadian Broadcasting Corporation and in 1992 became the youngest person to hold the position of senior producer at the broadcaster.

== Development and aid career ==
In 1999, Belmonte joined the International Red Cross and Red Crescent as project manager for a global campaign raising HIV/AIDS awareness within the Red Cross movement. The project was commended by UNAIDS as an example of best organisational practice.

In 2001, Belmonte joined UNICEF as the organisation's spokesperson at the Palais des Nations in Geneva, and later as UNICEF's Chief of Communications there. In 2005 she served as campaign manager in a worldwide campaign on children and AIDS, co-launched by UNICEF and UNAIDS. She later joined UNICEF's regional office in Latin America and the Caribbean, where she helped design public advocacy efforts for child focused development initiatives in 24 countries.

Belmonte was then appointed to the position of deputy director of Communications at UNICEF's headquarters in New York, a position she held until July 2012 when she took up the leadership of UNICEF's country program in Malaysia. In this role, she worked with the country's corporate sector and focused on digital citizenship, child online protection and how innovation can deliver improved results for children. Since 2016 Belmonte has been the organisation's Deputy Regional Director for East Asia Pacific.
