= Malaysian animation =

Animation in Malaysia (Malay: animasi, Jawi: انيماسي or dalangan دالڠن) has origins in the puppetry style of wayang kulit, wherein the characters are controlled by the puppeteer or dalang; animators are sometimes termed as such. The art of shadow play inspired German filmmaker Lotte Reiniger to create the animated The Adventures of Prince Achmed in 1926 that was based on one of the stories in the 1001 Nights. Many of the world's animators have credited Prince Achmed's recognisable style for generating their initial interest in animation as well as in their works.

== Early developments ==
=== Filem Negara Malaysia (Malayan Film Unit) ===
The Malayan Film Unit was created by the British colonialists in 1946 with the intent to produce documentaries and public service announcements of the government and later renamed Filem Negara Malaysia. A set designer working for the Unit named Anandam Xavier was asked to handle an animation project in 1961. Xavier set to work on the first in-country animation short subject "Hikayat Sang Kancil" (The Adventures of the Mousedeer) until 1978, although the short would not see a release until 1983.

A screenshot from Hikayat Sang Kancil

==== Animated shorts ====
The coming years would see additional hand-drawn animated shorts: 1984's Sang Kancil dan Monyet (The Mousedeer and the Monkey) and a 1987 follow-up, Sang Kancil dan Buaya (The Mousedeer and the Crocodile); 1985's Gagak Yang Bijak (The Clever Crow); and Arnab Yang Sombong (The Proud Rabbit) and Singa Yang Haloba (The Greedy Lion) both released in 1986, all written and directed by Hassan Abd. Muthalib. Live action films produced in Malaysia in the 1980s and 1990s began to feature animated sequences, particularly in the opening credit sequence of films like Mekanik, Mat Gelap and Yes, Tuan, all made by Hassan Muthalib.

==== Animation houses ====
The surge in Malaysian animation products resulted in the founding of two animation studios: FilmArt, established in 1984 and Lensamation, which opened its doors in 1987. Having these production companies in the country led to the legitimisation of animation as an art form and career path, and training schools and programs were instituted. The year 1995 saw the debut of the first animated television series, Usop Sontorian.

Usop Sontorian

== Modernisation and globalisation ==
The animation industry in Malaysia received some attention from Tun Mahathir bin Mohamad, the fourth Prime Minister of Malaysia with plans for rapidly modernising the country. This extended to the use of digital technology in production houses, predominantly the direct-to-system method of drawing into the computer pioneered by Kamn Ismail. The first computer animation efforts in Malaysia were the 2000 film "Nien Resurrection" and an episode of the series "Skyland" conceived and produce by Young Jump Animation Sdn. Bhd. However, in the late 1990s, Kamn Ismail had already included 3D elements in his Keluang Man animation series.

This era also saw an increase in efforts to aggressively promote locally produced animation efforts. Since 2000, the Malaysian animation industry has gone far globally when Multimedia Digital Economy Corporation (MDEC) produced Saladin: The Animated Series for Al Jazeera Children's Channel. Since then, many Malaysian animation companies marketed their works to globally. Their animation has succeeded in promoting Malaysia globally by creating content that was based on Malaysian culture but having universal values.

Several Malaysian animation films and series that have hit global market are:

- Geng: The Adventure Begins animated film
- Upin & Ipin animated series
- Bola Kampung animated series
- Satria The Warriors of 7 Elements animated series
- Synostone animated series
- BoBoiBoy animated series
- Ejen Ali animated series
- Ejen Ali: The Movie animated film
- Mechamato The Animated Series animated series
- Mechamato Movie animated film

Currently, Malaysian animation is dominant and the largest one in the ASEAN market, alongside Japanese and Western animation. Malaysia is regarded as the ASEAN hub for animation industry. Also, Malaysia became the first and only ASEAN country for its animated film to make it through the Academy Award nominations via Upin & Ipin: Keris Siamang Tunggal in 2020. This proved that Malaysia is now ready to compete with other dominant countries in animation such as Japan and the United States.

Malaysian animation also have their own brand, called #AniMY to representing Animasi Malaysia and Kontinjen Animasi, special for National Day.

== The role of Government ==
The Government of Malaysia, through its agencies, Multimedia Development Corporation and Malaysia Animation Creative Content Centre (MAC3) supports the industry by giving funding through grant scheme and providing world-class facilities to some key-players. The grants include Start-up Funds, Intellectual Property Grant Scheme and MAC3 Co-Production Fund.

Malaysia is one of the two countries in ASEAN where its animation industry is funded by the government, the other one being Singapore.

=== MAC3 Co-Production Fund ===
This grant was launched in 2009 to support the creation and development or co-development of Intellectual Properties under the Animation, Games & Computer Graphics sectors of the creative cluster.

The grant is designed to help local companies to co-produce animation and game development projects with partners that will contribute to the overall development of the industry in Malaysia.

== Foreign influence on Malaysian animation ==
Some local animations tend to include foreign elements, especially anime. This can be seen in the design of TV animation series such as Anak-anak Sidek, Edi & Cici and Sang Wira. This is because most of the animators were once trained by Japanese animators.

However, Kampung Boy, based on the characters of internationally known cartoonist, Lat has its own identity. It is seen as the best animation that portrays Malaysian cultures in the eyes of its creator. In the making of Kampung Boy, Lat was actively involved in the project.

== Persatuan Animasi Malaysia (Animation Society of Malaysia) ==
Animation Society of Malaysia, ANIMAS is a non-profit government organisation that promotes animation in Malaysia.

=== History ===
ANIMAS was officially registered as an organisation on 29 May 2007.

The idea towards the foundation of ANIMAS was first discussed at the Hiroshima Animation Film Festival in 1997. Hassan Abd Muthalib, the director of Silat Legenda, the first feature animation film in Malaysia in 1998; Hisham Harun Hashim, producer and executive producer of the first Malaysian animated film, Silat Legenda and Kamn Ismail, director of Usop Sontorian, agreed to form ANIMAS.

The idea was later discussed in 2001 during a meeting with Hassan Abd Muthalib, James Ooi and Richard Ung Kok Kee at the office of James Ooi. A series of meetings to form ANIMAS began in April 2001 and the 1st pro-tem committee met at Cempaka Sari Room, FINAS (the National Film Development Corporation Malaysia), Ampang, Selangor on 17 May 2001.

=== Activities ===
ANIMAS was finally officially registered only on 29 May 2007. However, even before registration, ANIMAS began to play an active role in the industry. ANIMAS was part of the main committee organising the Malaysia Film Festival and many other events. Hassan Abd Muthalib has been invited to Japan and China to present papers on the Malaysian animation industry a number of times.

In 2004, a seminar was organised with the collaboration of the French Embassy, Goethe-Institut Malaysia and FINAS at Balai Senilukis Negara (National Visual Arts Gallery). This seminar - Animation Industry in Malaysia: Current Situation & New Challenges - brought together for the first time most of the animation companies and training institutions in Malaysia. Among the foreign speakers were Ms Tiziana Loschi, Director of the Annecy International Animation Film Festival (France); Gilbert Hus, a producer and Regis Ghezalbash, a producer/director (both from France); Georges LaCroix, the director of the animation series, Insektors (France) and Ulrich Wegenast, an animation academic and director (Germany).

=== Collaboration ===
In 2008, ANIMAS collaborated with The One Academy of Communication Design in Sunway to present Animation Veteran awards to two pioneers of animation in Malaysia – Goh Meng Huat (the first animator in Malaysia who had been with Filem Negara Malaysia) and also to actor/director, Mat Sentol (the first feature film animator). The presentation was part of the Digital Art Competition & Convention held at Mid Valley Megamall. Hassan also gave a Powerpoint presentation of the history and development of the Malaysian animation industry during the event.

== Malaysian animation chronology ==
- 1972: Selamat Hari Natal
- 1979: Hapuskan Nyamuk Aedes
- 1985: Sang Kancil & Buaya
- 1986: Gagak Yang Bijak
- 1986: Arnab Yang Sombong
- 1987: Singa Yang Haloba
- 1996: Usop Sontorian
- 1996: Keluang Man
- 1998: Frootees
- 1999: Kampong Boy
- 1999: Anak- Anak Sidek
- 1999: Sang Wira
- 2006: Bola Kampung
- 2007: Upin & Ipin
- 2008: Supa Strikas
- 2009: Geng: The Adventure Begins
- 2009: Boo & Me
- 2009: CJ the DJ
- 2010: Ibn Battuta: The Animated Series
- 2010: Chuck Chicken
- 2011: Pada Zaman Dahulu
- 2011: BoBoiBoy
- 2012: Satria The Warriors of 7 Elements
- 2012: Akis
- 2012: SheZow
- 2014: The Amazing Awang Khenit
- 2014: Puteri
- 2015: Didi & Friends
- 2015: ABC Monsters
- 2015: Kuu Kuu Harajuku
- 2016: Hogie the Globehopper
- 2016: BoBoiBoy The Movie
- 2016: Ejen Ali
- 2016: Harry & Bunnie
- 2016: Kazoops!
- 2016: BoBoiBoy Galaxy
- 2017: Omar & Hana
- 2017: The King of Fighters: Destiny
- 2019: Upin & Ipin: Keris Siamang Tunggal
- 2019: BoBoiBoy Movie 2
- 2019: Ejen Ali The Movie
- 2021: Mechamato
- 2022: Mechamato Movie
- 2023: Didi & Friends The Movie
- 2024: Dongeng Sang Kancil
- 2025: Ejen Ali The Movie 2
- 2025: Papa Zola The Movie
- 2026: Kisah Bawah Tanah
- 2026: Legasi Kuasa
- 2026: Gelecek
- 2026: Papa Pipi Series
- 2027: BoBoiBoy Movie 3: Ghost of Gur'latan
- 2027: Robozeta The Movie

== Holidays ==
Due to Malaysia being a Muslim-majority country, most animated shows have Ramadan / Eid al-Fitr specials instead of Christmas. MONSTA often produces short films about Eid al-Fitr specials every year and some of them hit the trending charts in YouTube Malaysia and Indonesia. There are also short animated videos produced by companies to promote other holidays in Malaysia such Chinese New Year.

== Major events in Malaysian animation ==
These are the major events in the Malaysian Animation.

Year	Events	Remarks
1946	Filem Negara Malaysia formed by Mervyn cff Sheperd	
1947	First Malaysian animator - Goh Meng Huat	
1978	First short animation film - Hikayat Sang Kancil	Anandam Xavier
1982	First Animation studio - FilmArt	
1983	Mekanik (feature film) - first longest animated title sequence	Hassan Muthalib
1985	Second short animation film - Sang Kancil & Monyet	Hassan Muthalib
1985	Second Animation studio - Lensamation	
1987	Production of Epit and Din Teksi, the first cartoon characters to be animated for TV based on cartoonists Lat and Nan's characters	
1990	First cartoonist in hybrid live action-animated film, Imuda for Mat Gelap	Production: ZHA Production
1992	First student animation film, Bunga Karang by Zhang Kong Wah	Malaysia Film Academy
1995	First animated series - Usop Sontorian	Production: Kharisma Pictures. Director: Kamn Ismail. Character design: Ujang.
1997	First animation academy - The One Academy	
1998	First animated film (also first cel-shaded computer graphics in animated film) - Silat Legenda	Production: Peninsula Pictures
2000	First computer animation film on VCD - Nien Resurrection	Production: Young Jump Animation
2000	First book on 3D computer animation - Animasi 3D	Sharkawi Che Din, Dewan Bahasa dan Pustaka, Malaysia
2001	Second animated film - Cheritera	Production: Matahari Animation and Production
2001	Third animated film - Putih	Production: Fine Animation from Eurofine
2004	Kacang - First hybrid computer-animated / cel-animated	Production: Lensa Film
2005	Saladin: The Animated Series	Production: Silver Ant and Young Jump Animation
2006	First clay-animated television series - Ranggi	Production: Lensa Film
2007	First cel-animated television series aired globally - Bola Kampung	Production: Animasia Studio
2007	Production of Upin & Ipin, first computer-animated television series aired globally	Production: Les' Copaque Production
2009	First 3D computer-animated film for film theaters - Geng: Pengembaraan Bermula (English: Geng: The Adventure Begins)	Production: Les' Copaque Production
2011	Production of BoBoiBoy, second computer-animated television animation series aired globally	Production: Animonsta Studios
2011	Pada Zaman Dahulu (English: Once Upon A Time)	Production: Les' Copaque Production
2012	Computer-animated feature film in English for film theatres (also second computer-animated feature film in Malaysia) - SeeFood	Production: Silver Ant and Young Jump Animation
2012	Production of War of the Worlds: Goliath, first 3D computer-animated film with cel shading for digital 3D film theatres.	Production: Tripod Entertainment
2013	3D computer-animated feature film in Malay language for 3D theatres - Bola Kampung: The Movie.	Production: Animasia Studio and Young Jump Animation
2016	First CGI animation and live action film- Upin & Ipin: Jeng Jeng Jeng!	Production: Les' Copaque Production in partnership with KRU Studios
2018	Local animated film that goes across the Europe- Wheely	Production: Kartun Studios in partnership with KRU Studios
2019	First Dolby Atmos local animation film, first to be eligible for nomination to the Oscars- Upin & Ipin: The Lone Gibbon Kris	Production: Les' Copaque Production
2020	Goes to Turkey- BoBoiBoy: The Movie, BoBoiBoy Movie 2	Production: Animonsta Studios Sdn Bhd; distributed by CJ Entertainment Turkey and Two Productions
2022	Number 1 film series in Malaysia, (Note: This was right before Polis Evo 3 and Pendekar Awang overtook for their franchise respectively.) number 1 animated film series in Malaysia- BoBoiBoy: The Movie, BoBoiBoy Movie 2, Mechamato Movie	Production: Animonsta Studios Sdn Bhd in partnership with Astro Shaw as co-producer (Mechamato Movie only)
2023	First ever non-Japanese-produced (foreign) animation to win the Tokyo Anime Award Festival through Anime Fan Award- Mechamato	Production: Animonsta Studios
2023	Gen.T (Malaysia) from Tatler Asia	Nizam Razak as recipient
2024	First ever Malaysia animated film to screening in Japan- Mechamato Movie	Production: Animonsta Studios & Astro Shaw
2026	First ever adult animated television series- Kisah Bawah Tanah	Production: Animasia Studio
2026	First ever AI animation short film Michiru	Production: ARX Media Sdn. Bhd.

== Reception ==
Malaysian animation industry's success is well-received in several countries.

In Vietnam, several notable Malaysian animation productions like BoBoiBoy, Upin & Ipin, Mechamato, and Ejen Ali are mentioned by Vietnamese public, media and Vietnamese animators as the prime examples for the rapid development of Malaysian animation industry during public discussion about the solution for the growth of Vietnam's national animation industry. Some Vietnamese newspapers also mention Malaysia as a new rising name in the animation industry.

"Malaysia - New Animation Powerhouse" (Hà Nội Mới Newspaper)

"Malaysian Animation industry's Rapid Growth" (Cần Thơ Newspaper)

American animation industry magazine, Cartoon Brew, reported on the industry, claiming Malaysia having the "ever-evolving animation hub" of the Southeast Asia
