= BoBoiBoy (disambiguation) =

BoBoiBoy is a Malaysian animated series and franchise produced by Animonsta Studios.

BoBoiBoy may also refer to:

- BoBoiBoy, main protagonist of BoBoiBoy franchise
- BoBoiBoy Galaxy, a sequel series to BoBoiBoy
- BoBoiBoy: The Movie, a sequel movie to BoBoiBoy
- BoBoiBoy Movie 2, a sequel movie to the first season BoBoiBoy Galaxy
