= List of BoBoiBoy Galaxy episodes =

BoBoiBoy Galaxy is a Malaysian-animated series produced by Animonsta Studios. It is the sequel to BoBoiBoy. The first season aired from November 25, 2016 to July 11, 2018 on TV3.

The second season was released in four parts from December 3, 2023, to November 22, 2025.

== Series overview ==
Season	Episodes		Originally released	
Season	Episodes		First released	Last released
1	24		November 25, 2016	June 22, 2018
Movie			August 8, 2019	
2	22	6	December 3, 2023	December 28, 2023
2	22	6	June 1, 2024	July 6, 2024
2	22	4	December 21, 2024	January 11, 2025
2	22	6	October 18, 2025	November 22, 2025

== Episodes ==
=== Season 1 (2016–2018) ===
No. overall	No. in season	Title	Original release date
1	1	"BoBoiBoy Returns (BoBoiBoy Kembali!)"	November 25, 2016
Cici Ko and MotoBot have been trapped in space from the Power Sphere Hunter and the pirate minions start to head to Cici Ko's spaceship. BoBoiBoy and Gopal take the opportunity to become a hero by defeating that Power Sphere Hunter.
2	2	"Power Sphera, MotoBot (MotoBot!)"	December 2, 2016
Adu Du and Probe arrive on Earth and have captured MotoBot. Then Cici Ko, Ochobot, BoBoiBoy and Gopal track MotoBot's location to save him and at the same time they also fight with their old enemies.
3	3	"Planet Gurunda Exploration (Raksasa Gurunda)"	December 9, 2016
BoBoiBoy and Gopal having been initiated into TAPOPS, are sent on a mission to a planet called Gurunda.
4	4	"Cattus the Cute Monster (Gergasi Cattus)"	December 16, 2016
BoBoiBoy and his friends continue searching for the Power Sphere.
5	5	"BoBoiBoy Leaf VS The Pirates (Daun VS Lanun)"	December 23, 2016
Having returned back to Earth from their mission on the planet Gurunda, BoBoiBoy and friends are suddenly attacked by Captain Separo and his band of Space Pirates, who attempt to steal all the Power Spheres.
6	6	"Fang to the Rescue (Fang Penyelamat)"	December 30, 2016
BoBoiBoy with his friends departs on the Cici Ko's spaceship to travel to TAPOPS Space Station, but a stowaway causes some problems. The travel might not be so safe after all.
7	7	"Joe-ker-tu? (Joe Ker tu?)"	March 17, 2017
While on the way to the TAPOPS Space Station, BoBoiBoy and the others received a distress signal from the TAPOPS Space Station, only to find that things were not always as they seem, and a jester named Jokertu starts turning everyone into cards.
8	8	"Mission: Laundry Delivery (Misi Dobi TAPOPS)"	March 24, 2017
BoBoiBoy, Fang, and Gopal are sent on a mission to deliver some bags of laundry to a client on a dangerous planet called Dargha'ya, but it looks like someone else is ready to sabotage the mission.
9	9	"Katakululu's Hypnosis (Pukauan Katakululu)"	May 26, 2017
BoBoiBoy, Gopal and Fang are still in Planet Dargha'ya, trying to find the mysterious recipient and complete the mission. However, their mission is in peril when Adu Du has gone insane due to the hypnosis caused by a mysterious creature.
10	10	"The Savage Trial (Ujian KENTAL)"	June 1, 2017
Upon returning to TAPOPS Space Station, Tarung is enraged to find that Koko Ci has hired BoBoiBoy and his friends as TAPOPS agents. With that, Tarung gives them a series of tests to ensure that they are indeed qualified to be TAPOPS agents.
11	11	"A Fiery Fight (Pertarungan Hangat)"	June 8, 2017
BoBoiBoy, Yaya, Ying and Gopal go to a dangerous planet where their Toughness Test is held against them. They must defeat Team A and retrieve the Power Sphere hidden there.
12	12	"Phantom Thief Panto (Si Penceroboh Panto)"	June 15, 2017
A baby-like thief named Panto has come to TAPOPS and stole Power- Spheras.
13	13	"Dark Circus (Sarkas Kegelapan)"	June 22, 2017
BoBoiBoy and his friends go to Planet Circus to retrieve the stolen Power Spheres and face a great clowndiator, Jugglenaut.
14	14	"Thunderstorm Strikes (Kemunculan Halilintar)"	December 1, 2017
The battle between BoBoiBoy and Jugglenaut continues with the return of an old friend and an old elemental power upgrade.
15	15	"Nova Prix Space Race (Perlumbaan Nova Prix)"	December 8, 2017
Admiral Tarung instructs BoBoiBoy and his friends to win the Nova Prix Space Race and get the Power Sphera named TrophyBot.
16	16	"Looping Loopa (Loopa Lupa?)"	December 15, 2017
Admiral Tarung gives BoBoiBoy and his friends a break from TAPOPS work. They come back to Earth and decide to go for a picnic on the next day. Then they find a Power Sphere named LoopBot, having the powers to loop, which Adu Du wanted. BoBoiBoy and his friends must save LoopBot from Adu Du who wanted to do mischieves with his looping power!
17	17	"Making Waves (Gelora BoBoiBoy Air)"	December 22, 2017
The lava rock monster named Roktaroka came to Earth to get revenge from BoBoiBoy for destroying his house.
18	18	"B.R.R.O.'s Revenge (Dendam A.B.A.M.)"	December 29, 2017
In pursuit of BellBot, a robot called Accurate Ballistic Arrow Mercenary or A.B.A.M attacks Cattus' village. BoBoiBoy and his friends must travel to Gurunda once again to battle A.B.A.M and save Cattus' friends and family.
19	19	"Copy and Paste (Pencetak Rompak)"	May 24, 2018
BoBoiBoy and his friends were on their way home to the TAPOPS Space Station after successfully completing a mission. However, on their way home they face problems and are forced to seek help on nearby planets. Unexpectedly, they had to deal with alien piracy criminals that were most wanted by TAPOPS.
20	20	"Emotion Manipulation (Manipulasi Emosi)"	May 31, 2018
After returning to the TAPOPS Space Station, a Power Sphere named EmotiBot has manipulated BoBoiBoy's friends with emotion. The situation becomes more aggravated as Tarung becomes aggressive due to uncontrollable emotions, not to mention his use of power. At the end, it is revealed that EmotiBot is not really bad and that the Power Sphere's powers was used for evil by Power Sphere hunters.
21	21	"The Guardian Robot (Jagara Si Jaga)"	May 31, 2018
Due to the fact that BoBoiBoy did not succeed in getting information about light elemental power, he and his friends went to Planet Junkberg to seek help from DataBot. However, they have to answer some questions from Jagara so they can get into the Space Archives Ship.
22	22	"Infiltration Mission (Misi Koloni Lanun)"	June 14, 2018
BoBoiBoy and friends must infiltrate the Pirate Colony to retrieve Power Sphera StealthBot in order to save Sunnova Station.
23	23	"Pirate Armada Invasion (Ancaman Armada)"	June 22, 2018
As the battle of Sunnova Station wages on, BoBoiBoy fights to protect his friends from Captain Vargoba.
24	24	"Light of Hope (Sinaran Penamat)"	June 22, 2018
As the battle of Sunnova Station wages on, BoBoiBoy fights hard to protect his friends from the evil Captain Vargoba.

=== Season 2 (2023–2025) ===
No. overall	No. in season	Title	Original release date
BoBoiBoy Galaxy Sori
25	1	"Back in Action (Kembali Beraksi!)"	December 3, 2023
Some time after defeating Retak'ka (Note: As depicted in BoBoiBoy Movie 2), BoBoiBoy is tasked with mastering the third tier of his elemental forms to maintain galactic peace. He and his friends go to a secret underground base built by TAPOPS, whose main building now takes the appearance of a space car wash. Koko Ci and OchoBot also had upgraded BoBoiBoy's Power Watch to handle the third-tier elements. The episode ends with BoBoiBoy and his friends sparring with Adu Du and Probe, who work on their teleportation device.
26	2	"The Secret of King Balakung (Rahsia King Balakung)"	December 10, 2023
The group go to Planet Rimbara, a former colony of King Balakung, the original wielder of the Elemental Power of Timber who was slain by Retak'ka. Kasa introduces the group to Grandmaster Gaharum, Balakung's former royal advisor, who offers BoBoiBoy to prepare him an enchanted tom yum in a ceremony to awaken his third-tier element, similar to what Balakung did. Gaharum tasks them to find three core ingredients, accompanied by a blue flame stamen. The gang meet Qually, Gaharum's young apprentice, who offers to help find the ingredients. However, after BoBoiBoy's group battle Adu Du, Qually obtains one of the ingredients for himself.
27	3	"The Ultimate Recipe! (Resipi Warisan Terulung!)"	December 17, 2023
Returning with the ingredients, Qually reveals to the group he had the rare blue flame stamen which only blooms once in ten years. Hang Kasa suggests a tom yum cook-off between BoBoiBoy and Qually to determine the result. After three days' preparation, both parties are tied in the competition with BoBoiBoy using Earth substitutes. A complete dish is formed when both soups are mixed, and Gaharum respectively grants Qually and BoBoiBoy his cookbook and an Oakuat seed. Qually apologises to BoBoiBoy, joining his group.
28	4	"The Perilous Jungle! (Belantara Penuh Bahaya!)"	December 21, 2023
BoBoiBoy received the Oakuat seed from Master Gaharum, which would help him gain his third-tier element. He learns that he can speed up the growth of the Oakuat, which fruits only once in its 1000-year lifetime, using a Power Sphere named PlanterBot found on the planet Kadruax. The team set off to Kadruax, where BoBoiBoy, Yaya, Ying and Gopal disembark to track down PlanterBot. There, they encounter various Plantosaurs, hostile plant-like dinosaurian monsters, which later surround them at a bridge.
29	5	"The Ancient Tribe of Kadruax (Puak Purba Karduax!)"	December 24, 2023
Surrounded by Plantosaurs, BoBoiBoy splits into Solar and Thorn to fend off the large Plantosaur. Empowered by Solar's attack, it destroys the bridge, though Thorn saves Ying and Solar from falling. Yaya, Gopal and Thunderstorm were ensnared by a plant monster, then get captured by the local Baja tribe to be fed to the Plantosaurs next morning while Adu Du is crowned their chief, though Yaya helps them escape. Ying's team reach PlanterBot's location at a pyramid as they figure out how to enter the chamber. Unbeknownst to them, they were tailed by Adu Du and Probe, who unlock the chambers and trap Ying's team in the maze.
30	6	"The Merging of Two Powers (Paduan Dua Kuasa)"	December 28, 2023
Adu Du and Probe manage to reach PlanterBot as Yaya's team find Ying in the maze. They encounter various paintings about Karudax's history, revealing that the planet was barren before the Kubulus offered PlanterBot to the Baja to revitalise it by speeding up the growth rate of plants and trees, with the pyramid being built to thank the Kubulus. Adu Du unseals PlanterBot and uses it to grow a seed mistakenly believed to be the Oakuat taken from Probe. The seed becomes a large Plantosaur dubbed "Jumbosaur", as the real Oakuat seed was grown on Earth by Fang. BoBoiBoy re-splits Solar and Thorn, and fuses them into Sori to defeat the emergent Jumbosaur. Ying reclaims PlanterBot from Adu Du, and the team return to Earth with the Power Sphere.
BoBoiBoy Galaxy Windara
31	7 (1) (Note: Season no. (Story arc no.))	"Mystery Visitor (Pelawat Misteri)"	June 1, 2024
On planet Windara, Emperor Reramos orders the capture of former regent Kuputeri, who has emerged from her cocoon. Back on Earth, Gopal passes by a mysterious spaceship, and is abducted afterwards by its owner. The alien tells BoBoiBoy to meet at the park, introducing himself as Maripos. Despite Fang, Ying and Yaya intervening, Maripos defeats them before BoBoiBoy arrives. Maripos introduces the group to Kuputeri, who sent Maripos to reclaim BoBoiBoy's Tempest element. She then invites the group to planet Windara.
32	8 (2)	"Disruption in Windara (Pergolakan Di Windra)"	June 8, 2024
As BoBoiBoy's group board Kuputeri's spaceship to storm-engulfed Windara, Kuputeri telepathically shows them the situation there. Windara's inhabitants lived in harmony until Retak'ka attacked and drained Kuputeri's Tempest powers, leading to Emperor Reramos—Kuputeri's treacherous advisor—seizing power as Kuputeri hibernated for 100 years to recover from her injuries, making her believe in the Tempest power's importance towards saving Windara. Reramos also looted most of Windara's resources and greedily sold them. His Kelkatoan army, led by General Muskida, intercept Kuputeri's spaceship, forcing BoBoiBoy and Fang to escape in an emergency pod as Kuputeri is captured.
33	9 (3)	"Stranded (Terkandas)"	June 15, 2024
BoBoiBoy and Fang get stranded on Kepaku Valley in Windara after their emergency pod crashes there. Adu Du and Probe test their repaired teleportation device, while Yaya, Ying, Gopal and Maripos had lodged Kuputeri's ship at a nearby canyon. While trying to find settlements, BoBoiBoy and Fang were captured by a group of children led by Papileon, who take them to a resort centre named Kepaku Park. They meet the park's owner Tok Liam, whose family built it over the valley as a tourist attraction. He tells that Reramos turned Kepaku's landscapes into a quarry and mine, while Papileon and the children lived in the nearby village before the adults were enslaved into forced labour and Liam adopted them. After Muskida and his army fail to capture Liam's adopted children for hard labour, BoBoiBoy learns of Kuputeri's capture from Maripos.
34	10 (4)	"Kupuri Castle (Istana Kupuri)"	June 22, 2024
As Reramos plots to subjugate Windara's inhabitants, the group forge a plan to rescue Kuputeri from Kuputeri Castle and return her Tempest powers. Liam reveals he guarded the castle's armoury, giving the group a key to it. While Reramos interrogates Kuputeri about BoBoiBoy before ordering her loyalest general, Karumbang's arrival, Maripos and the group break into the cyclone surrounding Kupuri Castle and sneak into the armoury. Though a captured Probe and Adu Du temporarily steal the key, Fang manages to reclaim it, accessing the armoury, while BoBoiBoy and Maripos encounter Karumbang, brainwashed by Muskida, who defeats them. Maripos and BoBoiBoy are brought before Reramos, who offers the latter to keep the Tempest power, on the condition he returns on Earth and not meddle with his affairs.
35	11 (5)	"Knight of Windara (Kesatria Windara)"	June 29, 2024
While Ying and Yaya leave the castle with Fang and Gopal's assistance, BoBoiBoy and Maripos hear that Muskida used LampBot to brainwash Karumbang as Kuputeri helplessly watches. Just as Reramos dispatches Karumbang to subdue BoBoiBoy and Maripos, Ying, Yaya, Gopal and Fang intervene. Fang dresses BoBoiBoy in Windaran knight armour like the rest of the group, defeating Karumbang, the Kelkatoan army and their remaining generals as Reramos uses CocoonBot to turn into a moth-like spider beast. Meanwhile, Muskida attempts to brainwash Kuputeri with LampBot, using her telekinetic abilities to force the populace to bow to Reramos. However, Maripos attacks Muskida and throws LampBot out of the castle, freeing everyone. The transformed Reramos emerges, trapping everyone excluding BoBoiBoy in webs.
36	12 (6)	"Fight for Windara (Pertarungan Demi Windara)"	July 6, 2024
BoBoiBoy duels the transformed Reramos, and Mariposa is being healed by Kuputeri. A freed Karumbang tells her about Reramos' ability to drain others' life force to heal himself. He sacrifices himself to prevent Reramos from killing Kuputeri, fatally stabbed and drained in her place. After being overpowered by BoBoiBoy, Reramos tries to drain the rest of his group. However, Kuputeri heals BoBoiBoy, who plans to return her the Tempest power. Deciding to have BoBoiBoy keep them, she telekinetically sends him to the cyclone's eye to awaken his Tempest powers. BoBoiBoy then kills Reramos before losing control of his elemental form, forcing Kuputeri to intervene. In the aftermath, Kuputeri relinquishes her Tempest powers to BoBoiBoy, choosing to focus on rebuilding Windara.
BoBoiBoy Galaxy Gentar
37	13 (1)	"Fighting Without Fear (Berjuang Tanpa Gentar)"	December 21, 2024
To get more information about Warmaster Pyrapi for intelligence about BoBoiBoy's Nova powers, BoBoiBoy and friends return to planet Volcania to seek former enemy Roktaroka. The group receive a distress call from the NuBot robot factory calling for BoBoiBoy. BoBoiBoy and Gopal explore the factory, meeting the factory's robotic assistant Jo. They are later joined by Qually, before Probe, fused with a Robo-Dumpster, assimilates Jo. In the storage room, BoBoiBoy confronts the Robo-Dumpster, splitting into Thunderstorm and Earthquake. They fuse into BoBoiBoy Gentar, impressing Qually and Gopal. A hooded Adu Du then subdues Probe from behind.
38	14 (2)	"Heroes in Distress (Wira Dalam Bahaya)"	December 28, 2024
As Gopal, Adu Du, BoBoiBoy, OchoBot and Qually escape from the Robo-Dumpster, Yaya, Ying, Zola and Fang meet Roktaroka, who points that the face highlighted in the picture is his grandfather Toktaroka's. Roktaroka tells Yaya's group to take him to his home village on planet Baraju, and Adu Du's group plan to lure the Robo-Dumpster into a vault safe and rescue Probe. Ochobot reveals that the Robo-Dumpster was controlled by CodeBot, a Power Sphere who went on a rampage after being infected by a virus. CodeBot descends into the vault room, then captures and assimilates Ochobot.
39	15 (3)	"Peak of Tremendous Power (Puncak Gentaran Kuasa)"	January 4, 2025
Finding a way to save OchoBot, Gopal discovers an EMP arrow which was used to stun CodeBot, Qually helps them track down CodeBot, which is planning to teleport to planet Machina to consume its robots for energy. The group plan to utilise the reactor, which BoBoiBoy powers up, to provide enough electromagnetic energy to separate OchoBot from CodeBot. Qually assigns Gopal to lure CodeBot to the reactor, where he meets Adu Du, teaming up to subdue CodeBot. BoBoiBoy duels CodeBot as the reactor boots up and successfully separates Probe, though CodeBot escapes after draining the reactor.
40	16 (4)	"BuBaDiBaKo"	January 11, 2025
BoBoiBoy follows CodeBot to planet Machina, and Adu Du takes Gopal, Probe and Qually there with his teleportation device. Adu Du reveals he followed BoBoiBoy's team by placing a microchip on Ochobot to duplicate his portals for them, and fights CodeBot in his Windara armour. Gopal tricks CodeBot into attacking a hiding BoBoiBoy who drains its powers, before Qually pushes him out of the way in time. BoBoiBoy forges an armour suit to fight CodeBot, and Adu Du empowers BoBoiBoy with Probe as he chases CodeBot through several portals. BoBoiBoy drains CodeBot's energy, allowing him to defeat CodeBot and separate Ochobot from it.
BoBoiBoy Galaxy Baraju
41	17 (1)	"Hot As Ember, Cold As Snow (Sehangat Bara, Sedingin Salju)"	October 18, 2025
Yaya's team were shot down in their spaceship, the MYS Kebenaran, during a war on planet Baraju, a planet with partially hot and cold hemispheres, fought by its Bara and Salju tribes. Gopal, BoBoiBoy and a separated Jo cleanse the virus from CodeBot before being called to the crash site. On Baraju, Fang meets the alien Pak Pato who leads him and Roktaroka to Fire Rock Ice Village to meet Roktaroka's grandfather Toktaroka, while BoBoiBoy, Gopal and Qually pass through the Salju Tribe border to find Yaya and Ying.
42	18 (2)	"The Flames of War (Di Sebalik Api Sengketa)"	October 25, 2025
As BoBoiBoy Ice and Qually visit Ying, who is recovering at the Salju tribe. BoBoiBoy Blaze and Gopal were arrested by the Bara tribe, who accuse them of espionage, though they rescue Yaya. At Fire Rock Ice Village, Fang and Roktaroka meet Toktaroka and Rokkiah, Roktaroka's love interest. After conflicting narratives about the murders of elemental masters Mas Mawais and Warmaster Pyrapi according to their great-grandchildren Mas Gardu and Yanaari who respectively lead the Salju and Bara tribes, Toktaroka completes Roktaroka's family picture, telling the truth that Mawais and Pyrapi were not at conflict with each other. However, a cloaked guest later ambushes them. Blaze proceeds to contact Fang.
43	19 (3)	"Power Without Limit (Kuasa Tanpa Batasan)"	November 1, 2025
BoBoiBoy Blaze and Gopal head to a secret gathering place in the Bara tribe's military office, where the rest of the group communicate through their Power Watches: Yaya expresses her desire to end the centuries-old tensions between the Bara and Salju tribes, whereas Fang displays the complete family picture, summoning them to the volcanic Smoldering Frost Peak with Toktaroka as a witness, while OchoBot and Zola try to repair the Kebenaran. The next day, Blaze, Gopal and Qually sneak Yanaari up the volcano as Fang, Toktaroka and Roktaroka catch up. Realizing they had been tricked into heading to the peak's hidden colosseum, Gardu and Yanaari begin their customary duel of honour to the death, only for Blaze and Ice to stand in for them, During their battle, they nearly awaken their third-tier powers. Fang's group manage to break into the colosseum, interrupting the duel.
44	20 (4)	"The Light Behind the Clouds (Cahaya Di Sebalik Awan)"	November 8, 2025
After the rest of BoBoiBoy's group attempt to interrupt the duel, a guilt-ridden BoBoiBoy fuses back. Gardu and Yanaari attempt to resume it themselves, but BoBoiBoy fuses Cyclone and Solar into Sopan, mediating the situation. Fang and Roktaroka reveal that Mawais and Pyrapi sparred while training their powers and remained together when Retak'ka murdered them. The remaining group members have begun to fall into an eternal slumber after becoming manic from psychoactive berry puffs Qually prepared, leaving them vulnerable to an army of robots originating from an underground bunker, which are repelled by BoBoiBoy. Meanwhile, OchoBot and Zola explore the underground bunker.
45	21 (5)	"An Enemy in Disguise (Musuh Dalam Selimut)"	November 15, 2025
Toktaroka works on an antidote to awaken the remaining members of BoBoiBoy's group, while Roktaroka recalls his disappearance for 10 years, mistakenly believing that Rokkiah was having an affair with Mat Rokk, who is in fact Rokkiah's brother. Gardu reveals that Roktaroka's species came from the same village before being split into individual Fire and Ice races. As Zola and OchoBot leave the bunker, Gardu and Yanaari confirm that they purchased the stored weapons and that the bunker was not theirs. As Zola ferries Fang and BoBoiBoy back to Earth by spaceship, he succumbs to the psychoactive berries and drives erratically, but BoBoiBoy stabilizes the spaceship as it crashes. Pato arrives at the scene with antidote and takes the group to the bunker, revealing that he operates it and had been trafficking weapons to the Bara and Salju tribes, spinning the truths about their ancestors, and profiteering through the resulting warfare, before tranquilizing the group with sleeping gas. Pato then pilots his mech as he prepares to destroy planet Baraju.
46	22 (6)	"Baraju United (Baraju Bersatu)"	November 22, 2025
Zola, BoBoiBoy and Fang awaken inside Pato's prison, surrounded by a special alloy negating their Power Watches as Pato fires on the Bara and Salju armies. While Yaya and Ying defend the civilians before Pato captures them, Gopal transforms the prison's grates, allowing BoBoiBoy to escape. Zola and OchoBot find captive tribesmen in the mech's engine room. As Pato's mech is breached by external fire, Yanaari directs the tribal armies while Gardu heads to rescue BoBoiBoy. BoBoiBoy transforms into Gentar to absorb Pato's laser, then splits into Blaze and Ice, upgrading them into Nova and Blizzard. Zola and Gopal release the imprisoned tribesmen, and BoBoiBoy prevents Pato from killing Gopal but begins losing his memories. Pato attempts to escape with his mech's rocket mode, but is shot down, allowing Fang, Yaya and Ying to escape. After destroying the mech's core, an amnesiac BoBoiBoy Nova and Blizzard accuse Yaya of conspiring with Pato, but Qually sedates them with psychoactive berries. During the credits, Pato is arrested and the tribes rebuild their villages with BoBoiBoy's group, who then return to Earth. Later, Zola recounts his adventure in Baraju to Mama Zila and daughter Pipi.

== Movie ==
Title	Directed by	Written by	Original release date
BoBoiBoy Movie 2	Nizam Razak	Nizam Razak; Anas Abdul Aziz	August 8, 2019
