= Papa Zola The Movie =

2025 Malaysian animated film

- Theatrical release poster
- Directed by: Nizam Razak
- Written by: Nizam Razak
- Based on: BoBoiBoy by Nizam Razak
- Produced by: Nizam Razak; Noor Ezdiani Ahmad Fawzi
- Starring: Nizam Razak; Ieesya Isandra; Noor Ezdiani Ahmad Fawzi
- Edited by: Raja Nukman Raja Mohd Noordin
- Music by: Farique Nadzir; Adah Kahir; Simmy Lor
- Production company: Monsta Studios
- Distributed by: Astro Shaw
- Release dates: 6 December 2025 (GSC); 11 December 2025
- Running time: 111 minutes
- Country: Malaysia
- Language: Malay
- Box office: RM 68.2 million

Papa Zola The Movie is a 2025 Malaysian animated science fiction action comedy film written, directed and produced by Nizam Razak. It was released in Malaysia on 11 December 2025. The film grossed at RM 68.2 million, making it the highest grossing animated film in Malaysia.

== Synopsis ==
Papa Zola, a head of a family and a father who works as a food delivery rider and several other part-time jobs in order to support his family's life. However, behind their normal life, Papa Zola and his wife Mama Zila actually do not remember the past story they once went through, which was protecting Earth from aliens as members of the Protect and Prevent Agency (PAPA).

One day, Earth is suddenly attacked by aliens who use advanced technology that turns the city into a game-like battlefield filled with challenges and obstacles. Papa Zola's daughter, Pipi, is kidnapped by the aliens during the chaos, which causes Papa Zola to return to the PAPA agency together with YonB to save his daughter. At the same time, the aliens try to use the Power Sphera Cimubot to change the real world into a simulation world with the purpose of conquering Earth.

These events set Papa Zola on a mission to save the world and his daughter Pipi.

== Voice cast ==
- Nizam Razak as Papa Zola
- Noor Ieesya Isandra as Pipi Zola
- Noor Ezdiani Ahmad Fawzi as Mama Zila
- Yusuf Bahrin as Kachax Khan
- Aloeng Silalahi as YonB
- Nurfathiah Diaz as
  - BoBoiBoy
  - Oboi
- Dzubir Mohammed Zakaria as
  - Gopal
  - Opal
- Anas Abdul Aziz as Olien
- Mimi Aimi as Cimubot
- Ielham Iskandar Mohd Nizam as Otoi

== Production ==
The title was initially revealed as Papa Zola: Game On. During MONSTA CON 2023 at GSC LaLaport BBCC, MONSTA announced the film was titled Papa Zola: The Movie and expected to premiere in December 2024 during the school holidays.

This followed news that the character Papa Zola would be dropped from the upcoming BoBoiBoy movie due to fan requests. During Ramadan 2024, a short film was released on April 4, leading to the movie being postponed to 2025.

== Release ==
Papa Zola The Movie was released in Malaysia, Singapore, and Brunei on 11 December 2025. It was originally planned to release in December 2024.

It was released in Indonesia on 23 January 2026.

It was released on Netflix on 1 July 2026.

It was released in South Korea on 2 September 2026.

== Reception ==
=== Box office ===
Days of screening	Cumulative sales	Ref
4 days (14 December 2025)	RM10 million	
11 days (21 December 2025)	RM25.6 million	
18 days (28 December 2025)	RM43 million	
22 days (1 January 2026)	RM50 million	
27 days (6 January 2026)	RM55.5 million	
35 days (14 January 2026)	RM60 million	
50 days (29 January 2026)	RM65 million	
64 days (12 February 2026)	RM68.2 million	
