= Mechamato Movie =

- Theatrical release poster
- Directed by: Nizam Razak
- Written by: Nizam Razak
- Based on: Mechamato by Nizam Razak
- Produced by: Kee Yong Pin; Nizam Razak
- Starring: Armand Ezra; Adzlan Nazir; Fadhli Mohd Rawi; Ielham Iskandar; Marissa Balqis; Fazreen Mohd; Hazzley Abu Bakar; Feroz Faizal; Nizam Razak; Azrul Fazlan Hamdan
- Edited by: Dzubir Mohammed Zakaria; Raja Nukman Raja Mohd Noordin; Hafiz Ashraf Saipul Islam
- Music by: Yuri Wong; Nur Sharmine Md Bakri; Simmy Lor
- Production companies: Animonsta Studios; Astro Shaw
- Distributed by: Astro Shaw
- Release date: 8 December 2022
- Running time: 122 minutes (theatrical); 123 minutes (Astro On Demand)
- Country: Malaysia
- Language: Malay
- Budget: MYR 10 million (USD 2.13 million)
- Box office: MYR 35.88 million (USD 7.68 million)

Mechamato Movie is a 2022 Malaysian animated superhero film. It is a prequel to the Mechamato animated series. Produced by Animonsta Studios and Astro Shaw with distributed by Astro Shaw, the film is written and directed by Nizam Razak. The film follows Amato's first encounter with the MechaBot in a crashed prison spaceship where Amato eventually becomes the MechaBot's new master, leading them to be pursued by the mercenary Grakakus.

Initially announced for a 2021 release, the film was delayed numerous times due to the COVID-19 pandemic. This caused the animated series to be released before the movie. The film's release was officially announced in September 2022.

Mechamato Movie was released in Malaysia and Brunei on 8 December 2022 and in Singapore and Indonesia in March 2023, receiving mostly positive reviews. A follow-up titled Mechamato Movie 2 is officially planned for release in future.

== Plot ==
Amato studies as an apprentice to his silat master, Tok Sah. He leaves to work on a school project with his friend Pian, an automated drink maker dubbed the Cocoway-3000.

In a prison spaceship, a group of alien robots are made to fight in an arena with a Power Sphere named MechaBot being held inside. Power Sphere hunter Grakakus seeks to take control of said spaceship to capture MechaBot as part of his collection of armour-making Power Spheres. Pian informs his father Dr. Aman, founder of the tech giant DeStar in Kota Hilir, about the prison spaceship — which Grakakus crashed into Earth — dubbed "Comet Aman". Passing by the wreckage on the way home, Amato meets MechaBot as Maskmana obtains a sample of the debris. Frightened, MechaBot accidentally provokes a fellow inmate, Troket as a warning. Trocket then pursues Amato and MechaBot, during which MechaBot discards Amato's Cocoway-3000. Grakakus unsuccessfully tries to find MechaBot in the wreckage.

Amato's father Aba discovers MechaBot, believing he is the project Amato worked on. MechaBot demonstrates his abilities to merge objects into his body and pairs with Amato. MechaBot mechanizes a suit of armor with Amato as Trocket assaults them. They fight over a suspension bridge as Maskmana watches, where Amato saves Mara, a wheelchair-bound girl. Grakakus interrogates Trocket and learns that Mechabot is with Amato, preparing to kill him like what he did to MechaBot's previous master.

Amato heads to school and tells Pian the loss of their Cocoway-3000. The class is introduced to Mara, and Amato and MechaBot fail to impress with an improvisation. Amato introduces MechaBot to his classmates, narrowly escaping an ambush from Grakakus' robots. Pian tells Mara that his father is behind Maskmana, noticing a magazine cover with them standing together. MechaBot confides to Amato that Grakakus planned to capture him, forcing him to stow away in the prison spaceship. Sah — as Maskmana — then sacrifices his right arm to save Amato from Grakakus and Trocket.

Aman fixes Mara's wheelchair damaged in Amato's fight with Trocket as Pian and Mara inform him about the ambush. At DeStar, Amato notices that Aman, Sah and Mayor Andy had been controlling Maskmana, taking turns to fight crime under a secret identity. Sah reveals that the Maskmana suit was made from the same alloy as the prison spaceship's hull, empowering its auto-learning technology. Annoyed that MechaBot escaped, Grakakus upgrades his armor with one of his Power Spheres.

MechaBot unpairs with Amato to not pose as a threat, while Aman plans to use MechaBot's powers to defeat Grakakus before he captures MechaBot. Amato and his friends were pursued by Grakakus' robots who capture Pian and Mara. As Grakakus starts to wreak havoc on Kota Hilir, Aman distracts Grakakus, who then breaks his spinal cord, allowing Amato to reach MechaBot. Grakakus demands Amato to hand over MechaBot in exchange for Pian and Mara.

Amato tries convincing Sah to confront Grakakus with MechaBot to prove his worth, but Sah refuses due to his declining health. He tells Sah about MechaBot's past and how he considers him as a friend, convincing him to cancel the separation, allowing Amato to mechanize and fight Grakakus. Aman and Amato save Pian and Mara as Grakakus jettisons them from his ship. Grakakus fails to merge with MechaBot, who subdues him and re-mechanizes with Amato. Amato and MechaBot defeat Grakakus and destroy his spaceship, leaving him to be crushed by its wreckage. The group visit Aman in the hospital who thanks everyone for saving his life. Andy informs them about another robot attack, so Amato and MechaBot set off for another mission.

In credits scenes, Bago-Go, an alien weapons dealer who escaped the space prison, sets up shop at Grakakus' spaceship ruins and tries to sell Trocket, but is discovered by Aba, Andy, Sah and Aman. Years later, a grown-up Amato recounts his encounter with MechaBot to his son, BoBoiBoy, and orders him a yellow Power Sphere. (Note: Identified off-screen as OchoBot, a recurring Power Sphere in the BoBoiBoy series.) However, another alien, Adu Du, intercepts the delivery. (Note: As depicted in the first episode of BoBoiBoy (2011-2016))

== Voice cast ==
- Armand Ezra as the voice of Amato / Mechamato: a student who becomes the current master of MechaBot.
  - Irwan Dzafir voices an adult Amato, who serves as the narrator of the film.
- Adzlan Nazir as MechaBot: a red Power Sphera robot that gives its user the power to fuse with objects and create a personal suit of armor
- Fadhli Mohd Rawi as Grakakus: an alien mercenary that goes on a quest to search for armor-making Power Spheres.
  - Fadhli also voiced Ravi J: a local journalist
- Ielham Iskandar as Pian; Amato's close friend and Mr. Aman's son.
- Marissa Balqis as Tamara "Mara": a wheelchair-bound girl who attends the same school as Amato and Pian after the former saved her from Grakakus' attack.
- Fazreen Mohd as Tok Sah: Amato's silat teacher and a contributor to the Maskmana project.
- Hazzley Abu Bakar as Mayor Andy: the mayor of Kota Hilir who is also involved in the Maskmana project.
- Feroz Faizal as Mr. Aman: the owner of the DeStar Corporation who created the Maskmana suits and weaponry and Pian's father
  - Feroz also voices Troket; a rocket-like robot held within the Space Prison battle arena.
- Syabil Syamin as Deep: Amato, Pian and Mara's classmate.
  - Syabil also voiced Mr. Jamie: the design teacher of Amato's class.
- Anas Abdul Aziz as Aba: Amato's father who is a cocoa merchant.
- Siti Salwa Samsudin as Umi: Aba's wife and Amato's mother.
- Nizam Razak as Bago Go: a Kubulus con artist and black marketeer that was held in the Space Prison.
  - Nizam also voiced Bula: one of Amato's school bullies.
- Azrul Fazlan Hamdan as Bili; Bula's right-hand man and a bully to Amato.

Other cast members include Mohd Haziq Ikhwan Abd Rahman as Mr. Sasa, Mohd Rizdzuwan Md Jusoh as Mr. Senin, Irwan Dzafir Sudirman as Mr. Khamis, Mohd Mustazza Abu Hapaz as Uncle Gobi, Muhammad Huzaid Ghazali as Bob, Nur Yasmeen Che Muslim as Mara's mother, Anis Adilia Normuhayat as Mrs. Mah, Nur Yasmin Mohd Khairuddin as Ucu, Raja Nukman Raja Mohd Noordin as Naut; MechaBot's previous master who was killed by Grakakus, Nur Sharmine Md Bakri and Jazliy Abd Ghani as Anna and Sam, a pair of tourists and Meor Hizmin Amir Hassan and Norul Nabilah Mohd Yusof as TV hosts, with additional voices by Rizdzuwan Jusoh, Nur Yasmeen, Raja Nukman, Sharmine Bakri, Nabilah Yusof and Anis Adilla with additional voices by Aema Aezana Zulkafli, Nur Imanina Mohd Ismail, Nornazihah Abdul Kazar, Qatrunissa Shariff, Sakinah Shaharom, Meldanovita Umar, Mohd Azree Mohd Ariffin, Nur Farah 'Ain Syazwani Marzuki, Nur Syakilah Paimin, Amirul Arif Abdul Manaf, Mohamad Ibtisam A Halim, Mohd Mustazza, Muhamad Nazmeen Mohd Nasir, Shukran Lee, Dzubir Mohamed Zakaria and Amirul Hanafi Abdullah. Sharifah Sarah Syed Idros voices Amato's unseen wife and Imaad Iskandar voices BoBoiBoy, Amato's son.

== Production ==
Production for Mechamato Movie began in as early as 2019, when Monsta revealed the plan for Mechamato on a video for their 2020 plans as a feature-film project, which features the cutscenes from the movie. The movie production was temporarily halted to make way for the production of the animated series first after the movie released was delayed. Astro Shaw is confirmed as the investor and distributor, while Malaysia Digital Economy Corporation (MDEC) provided part of the funds and market access for Mechamato. In March 2022, the creator Nizam Razak said that due to the change in the screening sequence, the storyline will be changed a bit compared to the original plan. The movie which was 70% ready needs to be reworked to ensure that the storyline is more oriented towards the 'Origin Story'. In July 2022, they confirmed that they are working on getting the movie dubbed in Japanese, Korean and English. In November 2022, the creator mentioned that the tone of the movie will be more mature than the series. The English version is expected to be completed by March 2023. The initial duration was about 100 minutes, but Monsta extended it to 122 minutes as a result of changes and improvements to guarantee the audience's satisfaction. The final Digital Cinema Package (DCP) of the movie has been submitted to the cinemas on 23 November 2022.

== Music ==
The movie's theme song is performed by Yonnyboii titled "Temaniku", which was officially launched on 18 November 2022. Co-composed by Yonnyboii and Fitri Zain, Monsta's Chief Operating Officer Kee Yong Pin expressed his excitement at being able to work with an influential singer who is able to tap into the tastes of today's young generation. This song makes togetherness in achieving a goal as a message and inspiration, no matter if it is for the integrity of the relationship between friends, family, team or special friends. Kee Yong Pin also revealed that the process of making this theme song was done remotely, with MONSTA contacting a young composer from Sabah, Fitri Zain, after being interested in the music on his YouTube channel. Yonnyboii worked on the lyrics and finally, this song was produced, with Fitri Zain never meeting face to face with MONSTA until this film was released.

== Marketing ==
Official poster for the English language release in Singapore.

The official trailer was released on 1 January 2021, intended for the release of 2021 before it was postponed. On 8 July 2022, Monsta released the official poster reveal video on their YouTube channel. The final trailer and the official poster were revealed on 8 November 2022, a month before the release.

As an effort to promote this film, MONSTA in collaboration with Golden Screen Cinemas and Air Selangor has organized a running event, GSC x Air Selangor Hydro Run which was held on 26 November 2022 at IOI City Mall, Putrajaya. This event was attended by approximately 3,500 participants. GSC also exclusively produced the limited Mechamato figurines and popcorn boxes that the moviegoers can buy. MONSTA also collaborated with 10 Star Cinemas to release an exclusive MechaBot keychain which can be purchased for RM10 each.

On 1 December 2022, MONSTA premiered the first 10 minutes of the movie on Astro On Demand, while the release on YouTube came one day later. MONSTA also released the first 10 minutes for Japanese dub on their YouTube channel on 16 January 2024 in conjunction with Japan release.

The film was appeared around the 5th minute of the film when Luqman Hariz, an Astro Awani news anchor reporting the news about missing gold in around RM40 million value in 2024 film The Experts, co-produced by Astro Shaw.

== Release ==
Mechamato Movie was originally planned to be released in 2020, but postponed to 2021. However, due to uncertainty over the COVID-19 pandemic situation and vaccination, the film was postponed several times, from November or December 2020 to March 2021 to May or June 2021 and finally until end 2021. However, plans to release the film earlier than the animated series were cancelled due to the COVID-19 pandemic and the animated series had already been developed according to schedule which is set to be released in December 2021. The movie would be released after the first season of the animated series or even later, based on the COVID-19 situation. In March 2022, the creator Nizam Razak said that they were confident that they could release the film by 2022, while discussions with the cinemas to get the best slots and screening dates had already begun.

On 8 July 2022, Nizam announced that Monsta is working on getting the release date and shall be released during the year-end school holidays in Malaysia, Indonesia and Brunei. On 15 September 2022, it has been announced that the movie will be released on 8 December 2022 in Malaysian cinemas. On 9 November 2022, the release of the film in Brunei also on 8 December 2022 has been confirmed, while for other countries, the release would only start from 2023. Although the official release only starts on 8 November, a day-early sneak preview is also available throughout Malaysia. On 21 February 2023, Indonesia's release date has confirmed which is 1 March 2023 with CBI Pictures as the distributor of Indonesia. Then on 2 March, the English version release date has confirmed on 9 March 2023 in Singapore with the dub originally from Miami. For Japan release, Nizam are trying to configure where to release the movie either on cinema or on OTT platform such as Netflix. It was later released on 19 January 2024 in Japanese cinemas distributed by the Aeon Entertainment. This film became Malaysia's first animated and Astro Shaw film to release in Japan.

== Reception ==
=== Box office ===
Days of screening	Cumulative sales
1 day (8 December)	RM1.1 million
3 days (10 December)	RM5 million
6 days (13 December)	RM10 million
11 days (18 December)	RM18.3 million
15 days (22 December)	RM22.5 million
18 days (25 December)	RM27 million
22 days (29 December)	RM30.75 million
27 days (3 January)	RM33.8 million
28 days (4 January)	RM34 million

Mechamato Movie took in RM1.1 million on its first day. It managed to reach RM10 million after 6 days, matching the budget for this film. The film collected RM27 million after 18 days, thus beating out action comedy film Abang Long Fadil 3, animated adventure film Upin & Ipin: The Lone Gibbon Kris and buddy cop film by Astro Shaw, Polis Evo 2. The film collected RM30.75 million after only 22 days, breaking the record as the highest-grossing local animated film after overtaking both Ejen Ali: The Movie and BoBoiBoy Movie 2. It also beat out two action Malaysian army films of PASKAL: The Movie and Air Force The Movie: Danger Close. It is officially the third highest-grossing animated films in Malaysia behind Frozen II (RM38.55 million) and Ne Zha 2 (RM 49.37 million). After 2 months, this film was beaten by Polis Evo 3 to become Astro Shaw's highest box office film (RM50.11 million).

=== Critical reaction ===
Mechamato Movie received a huge positive outcome from critics and artist such from Yusof Haslam, Taufiq Hanafi, Faizal Hussein and many more. Hans Hanis written for Rollo de Pelicula wrote that he was surprised to see the introduction and development of the characters to feel near to them, besides the easy-to-understand story. MalaysiaGazette praises Nizam's maturity on his direction style besides the neat story without a swiping character such as Papa Zola from BoBoiBoy Movie 2 who voiced by Nizam himself. Action on the film also neat without take the long time to settle down. Maira from GamerSantai praises due to perfect introduction of Amato and MechaBot besides the fast pacing so they don't feel bored or dizzy while watching. She also praise the action that were given and she were even forgot this was a local made animation.

The film were also received positive reaction from Indonesia. Rizka Khaerunnisa for Antara News wrote that the film was served with a simple and easy flow story. She also feels entertaining and calm like animated film for kids and family. Elisabet written for Kompasiana thought that the movie will told about children's robot hero who face evil robots with a simple storyline. Turns out she was wrong about, and left speechless.
