= List of Mechamato episodes =

Mechamato is a Malaysian animated series produced by Animonsta Studios. The first season aired from December 4, 2021, to February 26, 2022 and the second season aired from December 5, 2022, to January 15, 2023. The third season were released on September 16, 2024. Netflix released the first ten episodes of the fourth season on September 6, 2025, with the remaining three released on September 16, 2025.

== Series overview ==
Season	Episodes		Originally released	
Season	Episodes		First released	Last released
1	13		December 4, 2021	February 26, 2022
2	13		December 5, 2022	January 15, 2023
3	13		September 16, 2024	
4	13	10	September 6, 2025	
4	13	3	September 16, 2025	

== Episodes ==
=== Season 1 (2021–22) ===
No. overall	No. in season	Title	Original release date
1	1	"Out of Cone-trol (Kemunculan Koncho-Koncho)"	4 December 2021
On their way to school, Amato and MechaBot has just encountered a cone-shaped robots called Konchos who has been causing a rampage on Kota Hilir.
2	2	"King of the Chill (Di Bawah Paras Beku)"	5 December 2021
When Amato, MechaBot, and Pian are going to the beach, a fridge-like robot called Sejukku has the ability to froze the entire Kota Hilir. So it's up to Amato and MechaBot to stop him.
3	3	"Rubika Defense System (Sistem Pertahanan Rubika)"	11 December 2021
After capturing a goose-like robot called Goosar, MechaBot has run out of battery which Amato and Pian brought him to a crashed spaceship where they have to deal with a cube-shaped giant robot called Rubika.
4	4	"Amazeey's Labyrinth Challenge (Cabaran Labirin Amazeey)"	12 December 2021
Mr. Jamie has been kidnapped by an overconfident and challenging robot named Amazeey who had turned the entire school into a labyrinth, so it's up to Amato, MechaBot, Mara and Deep to save him before it's too late.
5	5	"Don't Mess with the Janitor (Jangan Cari Pasal Dengan Janitoor!)"	18 December 2021
When a bad robot named Janitoor crashes into Pian's house, shocked by how unclean it is, he is alone at home. When Amato and MechaBot arrive to assist, a horrified MechaBot explains that Janitoor is one of the most dangerous robots in the Space Prison and the five-time Space Arena Champion. He is now pursuing them.
6	6	"Social Media Ninja (Ninja Media Sosial)"	19 December 2021
People are getting caught in awkward time loops for no apparent reason, and footage of them are being shared online. Amato discovers that Ninjamera, a sneaky bad robot who likes to sneak up on unsuspecting people and record them in their most embarrassing moments, is the culprit. The videos of his victims are then shared on social media. Before more people fall victim to Ninjamera's online shaming, Amato and his friends must find a way to track him down.
7	7	"The Art Thief (Pencuri Seni Lukis)"	25 December 2021
Amato has completed a drawing of his new invention, a drawing that no one can understand except Pian. They discover on their way to school that Paintasso, a bad robot, has stolen artwork from a kindergarten that he thinks to be wonderful pieces of art. Amato has no choice but to chase Paintasso when he returns to kidnap one of the talented kids in order to generate more paintings for him.
8	8	"Off-Key Karaoke (Karaoke Sumbang)"	26 December 2021
Amato is studying for his exams when he is awakened by a loud and horrible singing in the middle of the night. Karok, a bad robot that was thrown into Space Prison for singing inside the Space Library, is the owner of the horrible voice. Every night, the singing gets louder, and it begins to interfere with Amato's sleep and studies. He must stop Karok before he fails his examinations as the result of the bad robot.
9	9	"Retro Tech (Teknologi Retro)"	12 February 2022
By accident, Amato and MechaBot are transported into a retro video game world, and the only way out is to beat the game.
10	10	"The Arsonist (Api Jadi Lawan)"	13 February 2022
Amato and friends rush to put out a fire, but they suspect someone or something may be behind it.
11	11	"A Sore Winner (Jaguh Segala Jaguh)"	19 February 2022
It's Sports Day at school, and Amato has his sights on the top prize, but a robotic challenger appears to dash his hopes.
12	12	"Block World (Dunia Blok)"	20 February 2022
While camping in the forest, Amato and friends come across a mysterious mansion made of toy blocks.
13	13	"The Legend of Sumorai (Legenda Sumorai)"	26 February 2022
After a bad robot robs Uncle Gobi's store, Amato and friends set out to find it by following its trail of destruction.

=== Season 2 (2022–23) ===
No. overall	No. in season	Title	Original release date
14	1	"Food Fight (Asam Garam Kecam!)"	5 December 2022
15	2	"The Goblin & The Monster (Misteri Penunggu Sekolah)"	12 December 2022
16	3	"A Scary Screw-Up (Rehabilitasi Robot)"	19 December 2022
17	4	"Mechanizer World (Rampasan Takhta Blok)"	26 December 2022
18	5	"A Dangerous Game (Perangkap Arked)"	26 December 2022
19	6	"Plastic Bottle Royale (Pertembungan Kitar Semula)"	31 December 2022
20	7	"The Destar Prix Race (Perlumbaan Destar Prix)"	31 December 2022
21	8	"Cone-Nichi Wa! (Kon-nichi-wa!)"	1 January 2023
22	9	"Moody Weather (Diva Di Awan)"	7 January 2023
23	10	"Board Game (Empayar Papan Permainan)"	8 January 2023
24	11	"The Toopee Show (Rancangan Tumpang Toopee)"	14 January 2023
25	12	"Out Of This Worm: Part 1 (Masalah Kecil: Bahagian 1)"	15 January 2023
26	13	"Out Of This Worm: Part 2 (Masalah Kecil: Bahagian 2)"	15 January 2023

=== Season 3 (2024) ===
No. overall	No. in season	Title	Original release date
27	1	"Attack of the Duck (Serangan Si Itik)"	16 September 2024
28	2	"Obey the Mummy! (Dengar Cakap Mami)"	16 September 2024
29	3	"Social Media Fever (Demam Media Sosial)"	16 September 2024
30	4	"Pyramid of Fulus (Piramid Fulus)"	16 September 2024
31	5	"Shadow Puppet Showdown (Wayang Bayang)"	16 September 2024
32	6	"Welcome to Robojaya (Selamat Datang ke Robojaya)"	16 September 2024
33	7	"Tiny Trouble with Vendator (V untuk Vendator)"	16 September 2024
34	8	"Art Rivals (Seteru Seni)"	16 September 2024
35	9	"Rise of the Koncho Rangers (Kebangkitan Koncho Rangers)"	16 September 2024
36	10	"The Art of Roborigami (Seni Roborigami)"	16 September 2024
37	11	"The Hair-Destroying Robot (Masalah Kusut)"	16 September 2024
38	12	"The Return of Chachix (Chachix Kembali)"	16 September 2024
39	13	"MaskChachix's Revenge (Dendam MaskChachix)"	16 September 2024

=== Season 4 (2025) ===
No. overall	No. in season	Title	Original release date
40	1	"Imperfect Prefect (Awas, Pengawas!)"	6 September 2025
41	2	"The Memorino Virus (Virus Berjangkit)"	6 September 2025
42	3	"Doorway to Adventure (Pintu Pengembaraan)"	6 September 2025
43	4	"The Impostor Game (Permainan Penyamar)"	6 September 2025
44	5	"An Offer You Can't Refuse (Penghasoot)"	6 September 2025
45	6	"Dollhouse Mystery (Misteri Rumah Patung)"	6 September 2025
46	7	"Shoestring Budget (Jimat Tak Cermat)"	6 September 2025
47	8	"A Load of Trouble (Cuci, Cuci!)"	6 September 2025
48	9	"Folded Football Friendly (Bola Sepak Kertas)"	6 September 2025
49	10	"The Fandom Menace (Peminat Tegar)"	6 September 2025
50	11	"K-O!: Part 1 - A New Villain Escapes?! (K-O!: Part 1 - Penjahat Baharu Terlepas?!)"	16 September 2025
51	12	"K-O!: Part 2 - The Final Battle at Space Prison! (K-O!: Part 2)"	16 September 2025
52	13	"K-O!: Part 3 - The Brutal Battle Begins! (K-O!: Part 3 - Pertarungan Ganas Bermula!)"	16 September 2025
