= BoBoiBoy Galaxy =

Malaysian animated television series

- Genre: Science fiction Action; Adventure; Superhero
- Created by: Nizam Razak
- Developed by: Safwan Karim
- Written by: Nizam Razak; Anas Abdul Aziz; Meor Hizmin Amir Hassan; Raja Faisal Raja Ihsanuddin
- Screenplay by: Nizam Razak; Meor Hizmin Amir Hassan; Raja Faisal Raja Ihsanuddin; Anas Abdul Aziz
- Directed by: Dzubir Mohammed Zakaria; Yap Ee Jean; Raja Nukman Raja Mohd Noordin; Muhammad Akid Jamel; Ashdeeq Anuar
- Voices of: Nur Fathiah Diaz; Dzubir Mohammed Zakaria; Nur Intan Syuhadah; Yap Ee Jean; Wong Wai Kay; Ferdiawan Gunarto; Anas Abdul Aziz; Nizam Razak; Orked Naurah Syazwan
- Narrated by: Anas Abdul Aziz; Ferdiawan Gunarto; Dzubir Mohammed Zakaria
- Theme music composer: Nizam Razak; Sharmine Bakri
- Opening theme: "Dunia Baru" (Note: It is written and composed by Sam Bunkface & produced and performed by Bunkface) (S1) "Kembali Beraksi" (Note: It is written by Nizam Razak & performed by Firdaus Rahmat) (S2)
- Ending theme: "Di Bawah Langit Yang Sama" (Note: It is written and composed by Iksan Skuter & produced and performed by D'Masiv) (S1) "Teman Setia" (Note: written by Nizam Razak & produced and performed by Maizura) (S2)
- Composers: Nabil Zuhaily; Raymond Woo; Sharmine Bakri
- Country of origin: Malaysia
- Original language: Malay
- No. of seasons: 2
- No. of episodes: 46 (list of episodes)

Production
- Executive producers: Kee Yong Pin; Noor Ezdiani Ahmad Fawzi
- Production locations: Animonsta Studios; Bunnydog Studio (Note: Bunnydog Studio helps in animation department for Season 2); Manimonki Studios (Note: Besides Bunnydog, Manimonki helps in animation and visual effects department for Season 2); Enspire Studios (Note: Since Windara arc)
- Editors: Dzubir Mohammed Zakaria; Raja Nukman Raja Mohd Noordin; Muhammad Akid Jamel; Ashdeeq Anuar
- Running time: 22-23 minute
- Production company: Animonsta Studios

Original release
- Network: TV3; YouTube (Note: Through Monsta's YouTube channel); Netflix
- Release: November 25, 2016 – present

Related
- BoBoiBoy; Mechamato

BoBoiBoy Galaxy is a Malaysian animated superhero television series and sequel to BoBoiBoy and BoBoiBoy The Movie, with a comic series released shortly before the animated series.

The first season of the animated series aired from November 2016 to June 2018 and was followed by BoBoiBoy Movie 2. The second season aired from December 2023 to November 2025.

The first season of the comic series was published slightly before the first season of the animated series, and the second season ran from March 2020 to April 2023.

== Plot ==
The first season follows BoBoiBoy and his friends who are assigned by the intergalactic organization T.A.P.O.P.S. (Tracker and Protector of Power Spheres) to track down and protect the scattered Power Spheres, robots created to grant great power to their owners. Hunted by aliens seeking to exploit their abilities, the Power Spheres flee and hide across the galaxy, and BoBoiBoy's team must recover them before they fall into the wrong hands.

In the second season, BoBoiBoy and his friends travel across the planets Rimbara, Kadruax, Windara, Machina, Baraju, and Gur'latan. On these planets, they work to unlock BoBoiBoy's third-tier elemental powers and complete missions, with several of them having once been home to former elemental users.

== Voice actors ==
- Nur Fathiah Diaz as BoBoiBoy
- Dzubir Mohammed Zakaria as Gopal
- Nur Sarah Alisya Zainal Rashid / Nur Intan Syuhadah as Yaya
- Yap Ee Jean as Ying
- Wong Wai Kay as Fang
- Ferdiawan Gunarto as Qually
- Orked Naurah Syazwan as Ochobot
- Nizam Razak as Papa Zola
- Anas Abdul Aziz as Mr. Aba, Koko Ci, Adu Du, Probe, Mr. Kumar
- Nur Farah 'Ain Syazwani as Adu Du's Computer
- Mohd Ariff Abd Rahman as MotoBot
- Amirul Hanafi Abdullah as Admiral Tarung
- Wong Pak Lin as Hang Kasa

=== English dub ===
==== Season 1 ====
- Marsya Danialla Razak as BoBoiBoy
- Ryan Lee Bhaskaran as Gopal
- Puteri Sabrina Affenddy as Yaya
- Chan Su Ling as Ying
- Wong Wai Kay as Fang
- Ilhan Mohd Shahrizal as Ochobot
- Anas Abdul Aziz as Tok Aba, Koko Ci, Adu Du, Probe, Papa Zola and Uncle Kumar
- Adila Shakir as Adu Du's Computer
- Azman Zukiply as MotoBot

==== Season 2 ====
- Ghia Burns as BoBoiBoy
- Daniel Cortes as Gopal
- Crystal Lopez as Yaya
- Starr Leavitt as Ying
- Clay Cartland as Fang
- Benjamin Leon IV as Qually
- Kamilo Alonzo as Ochobot
- Paul Louis as Tok Aba
- Alex Alvarez as Papa Zola
- Alex Machado as AduDu

== Production ==
Nizam Razak, the creator of BoBoiBoy, said that the idea of changing the storyline came in 2014 when he was in Japan. He was impressed with the diversity of Pokémon merchandise, getting the idea to diversify the Power Spheres. They started making the series after the end of BoBoiBoy mid-2016 and changed the storyline to be more active where BoBoiBoy would travel around the galaxy instead of waiting for enemies to come to Earth. The series takes place one to two years after the original series, although the target audience is still 7 to 18 year olds.

== Release ==
Animonsta Studios unofficially announced BoBoiBoy Galaxy in 2013 where they released a picture of a BoBoiBoy Galaxy poster featuring what was believed to be new costumes for BoBoiBoy Blaze and BoBoiBoy Ice. Animonsta later revealed their plans for BoBoiBoy Galaxy on their website.

Animonsta Studios then officially announced on their Facebook account that BoBoiBoy Galaxy would be aired in June 2016. After BoBoiBoy: The Movie, they made a new and detailed announcement: the storyline will feature the heroes travelling across the galaxy to search for Power Spheras and will take place 2 to 3 years after BoBoiBoy: The Movie. Animonsta will also release the comic first, before the animated series. They also announced that production will start soon and they expect to release the first batch of episodes between September and December 2016.

In July 2016, they announced that BoBoiBoy Galaxy will start airing during year-end school holidays in Malaysia on TV3.

== Media ==
=== Animated series ===
The first season consists of 24 episodes. The first episode was broadcast on 25 November 2016, with new episodes broadcast on TV3 and Mediacorp Suria. The first six episodes were broadcast consecutively. It aired on Disney Channel Southeast Asia on 7 July 2017, on MNCTV in January 2017 and February 3, 2017, on its official YouTube channel. The first season concluded on 21 June 2018 in Malaysia on Eid al-Fitr month.

A second season premiered on 3 December 2023 and divided into 4 parts. Monsta release the poster and date back in 21 August 2023 with the caption shows it will release on multiple platforms. The teaser was released on 15 September 2023 in conjunction with Monsta's 14th anniversary. For season 2, Monsta exclusively released on Netflix, TV9 and Monsta's YouTube so far.

=== Comics ===
The first season comics were published from November 2016 to June 2018, consisting of seven issues, while the second season ran from March 16, 2020, to April 21, 2023, totaling 27 issues. The second season comics were released prior to the animated series and were exclusively made available on digital platforms such as Google Play Books and Webtoon.

==== Season 1 ====
Issue	Title
1	Journey to Space (Kembara Ke Angkasa)
2	The Spirited One (Adiwira Bersatu)
3	New Challenges (Cabaran Baharu)
4	A Legend Appears (Kemunculan Lagenda)
5	Power Surge (Gelora Kuasa)
6	Secret Of Demolition (Pembongkaran Rahsia)
7	Light's Explosion (Ledakan Cahaya)

==== Season 2 ====
Issue	Title	Release date
1	Back in Action! (Kembali Beraksi!)	March 16, 2020
2	The Secret of King Balakung! (Rahsia King Balakung!)	June 26, 2020
3	Trial of the Century! (Perbicaraan Terhebat!)	July 27, 2020
4	Reach for the Skies! (Pendakian Hingga Ke Langit!)	August 26, 2020
5	A Mystery in the Canyons (Misteri Pergunungan Tandus)	September 28, 2020
6	The Ultimate Recipe! (Resepi Warisan Terulung!)	November 23, 2020
7	The Perilous Jungle! (Belantara Penuh Bahaya!)	December 25, 2020
8	The Ancient Tribe of Kadruax! (Puak Purba Kadruax!)	February 26, 2021
9	The Merging of Two Powers! (Paduan Dua Kuasa!)	March 26, 2021
10	Mysterious Visitors from Outer Space! (Pelawat Misteri Dari Angkasa Lepas!)	April 29, 2021
11	Windara in Turmoil (Pergolakan Di Windara)	September 25, 2021
12	Stranded! (Terkandas!)	October 29, 2021
13	Knights of Windara! (Kesatria Windara!)	November 26, 2021
14	The Battle for Windara! (Pertarungan Demi Windara!)	January 28, 2022
15	Ready to Rumble (Berjuang Tanpa Gentar)	February 25, 2022
16	Superheroes in Distress (Adiwira Dalam Bahaya)	April 1, 2022
17	The Peak of Tremendous Power (Kemuncak Gentaran Kuasa)	April 29, 2022
18	Hot as Ember, Cold as Snow (Sehangat Bara, Sedingin Salju)	June 3, 2022
19	The Flame Behind the Fire (Di Sebalik Api Sengketa)	July 1, 2022
20	Power Without Limit (Kuasa Tanpa Batasan)	July 29, 2022
21	The Light Behind the Clouds (Cahaya Di Sebalik Awan)	September 2, 2022
22	Lightning and Thunder (Kilat dan Guruh)	September 30, 2022
23	Under Pursuit (Dalam Buruan)	October 28, 2022
24	Galaxy in Crisis! (Galaksi Dalam Krisis!)	December 2, 2022
25	Cycle of Vengeance (Kitaran Kesumat)	February 1, 2023
26	Release Your Power (Lepaskan Kuasamu)	March 7, 2023
27	Under the Same Sky (Di Bawah Langit yang Sama)	April 21, 2023

=== Movies ===
BoBoiBoy Movie 2 is the second film in the BoBoiBoy franchise from Animonsta Studios and a follow-up to BoBoiBoy The Movie and the first season of TV series BoBoiBoy Galaxy. It is co-written by Nizam himself and Anas Abdul Aziz. This is the first film to use settings and characters from BoBoiBoy Galaxy.

It was released simultaneously in 4 countries, including Malaysia, (Note: For Malaysian market, Astro Shaw distributed the film) Indonesia, Brunei, and Singapore on 8 August 2019. The film was released in Vietnam on 30 August 2019.

Originally, the third movie based on Galaxy was supposed to be released on 2022. Due to the COVID-19 pandemic and the release of Mechamato Movie, Monsta was forced to delay the third movie until at least 2026, with Nizam Razak set to direct again and Astro Shaw to continue distributed together with Keluang Man film.

=== Motion comic ===
The first six issues of season 2's comics was released in motion comic format from October 2022 to May 2023, with Shukran Lee directing all 6 episodes.

== Reception ==
For the first six episodes in Season 2, it tops the chart for TV Shows in general on Netflix Malaysia, collected almost 1.84 million viewers for TV9 Malaysia and accumulated 65 million viewers on Monsta's YouTube channel.
