= Keluang Man =

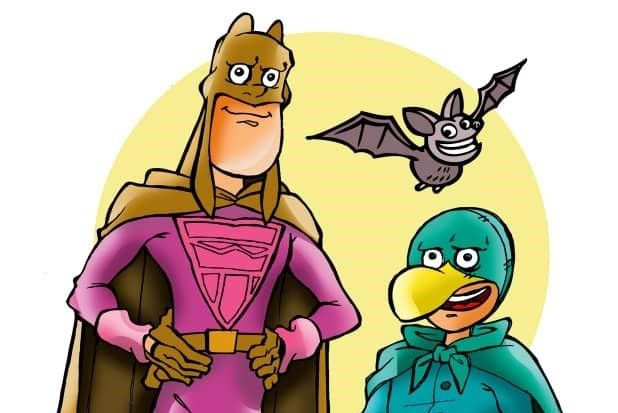
- Genre: Superhero; Animation; Comedy
- Created by: Kamn Ismail
- Written by: Kamn Ismail; Raja Zaharuddin Shah Raja Chik; Azhar Saad; Karim Wahab; Azizi Mohd Amsam; Sheikh Zulkibri Salim; Ameir Hamzah Hashim; Fazarel Ehsan Altaha; Kathy Ismail
- Directed by: Kamn Ismail; Mohd Ariffin Jamal; Arjuna Ibnu Tapa
- Voices of: Akib Junid; Azhar Saad; Wan Ayumi Wan Yusof; Asmawi Ahmad; Hafidz Abu Hasan; Karim Wahab; Nazirah Kamarudin; Azman Wahab
- Theme music composer: Syed Imanzali
- Opening theme: "Keluang Man" by Krisya
- Ending theme: "Keluang Man" (1998–2002); "Kau Superheroku" (2003–2005)
- Country of origin: Malaysia
- Original language: Malay
- No. of seasons: 7
- No. of episodes: 144

Production
- Executive producers: Mohd Kamari Mohamad; Mohd Ariffin Jamal; Mohd Faudze Md Taib
- Producers: Kamn Ismail; Natashah Hj. Mohd Nor; Hazlinda Mohd Salleh
- Editors: Kamaruddin Khalid; Daneal Raymond; S.V. Selvam
- Running time: 20 minutes
- Production company: UAS Animation Studios (M) Sdn. Bhd.

Original release
- Network: TV1
- Release: August 1, 1998 – 2005

Keluang Man is a Malaysian comedy superhero animated television series aired on TV1 from 1998 to 2005. Based on the fruit bat (Malay: keluang), (Note: Keluang (alternately Kluang) is also the name of a town in central Johor. It is 75 km northwest from Tampoi.) his costume and appearance is based on DC Comics' Batman. It is created by Kamn Ismail, best known for his directorial role in Usop Sontorian. A live-action film adaptation was released in May 2025.

== Overview ==
Keluang Man was created by Kamn Ismail and his team of animators in June 1997, following the end of Usop Sontorian as he wanted the presence of "National Hero" at the time. A few months later, the team was augmented by a group of new junior animators. Production halted for a while due to the economic crisis in 1997 and 1998, but later continued in 2000 until the series finally ended in 2005.

== Synopsis ==
Set in Tumpoi, a fictional city inspired by the real city of Tampoi, Johor (near Johor Bahru), Keluang Man made his first appearance in an alley where a man is trying to rob a girl. Since then, Keluang Man has been media's most wanted. Keluang Man's real name is Borhan and he is actually one of the mental patients in Tampoi Mental Hospital (1°31′9″N 103°42′49″E). The hospital security makes it hard for Keluang Man to act during daylight, so he decided only to fight for justice at night.

However, the existence of Keluang Man as a justice fighter did not make Inspector Shahab, the local police chief sit very well in his position. He sees Keluang Man as an annoying hero who always disturbs the police's business until he ordered that Keluang Man be arrested but was unsuccessful.

In the second episode of the first season, Tiong Man makes his first appearance as a counterpart, holding a similar role as Robin in the Batman series. Both superheroes work together to fight supervillains such as Badut (The Clown), Mata Batu Johan Hitam, Samsir, Majid Kilat, Meow The Cat Girl and many more with the hope that the town of Tumpoi will turn back into a peaceful place for everyone.

== Broadcast ==
Keluang Man start aired on TV1 on August 1, 1998 and spanned seven seasons until 2005 with reruns until 2007. In 2008, Keluang Man was re-aired on TV9.

== Adaptation ==
=== Comic ===
A comic based on the series was released on June 1, 1999.

=== Live-action film ===
Iconic Animation Studio, which owns the intellectual rights of Keluang Man, signed a deal with Astro Shaw to produce and bring Keluang Man to cinema based on agreement in Astro HQ in Bukit Jalil. The film will directed and produced by Anwari Ashraf with scriptwriting by Astro Shaw's Writers' Room and was released on 29 May 2025.

== Bibliography ==
- Lent, John A. (2001). Animation in Asia and the Pacific. John Libbey. ISBN 978-1-86462-036-8.
