= Nizam Razak =

Malaysian animator

- Born: Mohd Nizam bin Abdul Razak; Muar, Johor, Malaysia
- Education: Mass Communication
- Alma mater: Multimedia University
- Occupations: Animator, co-founder & Managing Director of Animonsta Studios
- Years active: 2005–present
- Spouse: Ezdiani Ahmad Fauzi (m. 2004)
- Children: 3

Mohd Nizam Abdul Razak is a Malaysian animator. He is best known as the creator and director of Malaysian animated series, BoBoiBoy and its franchise. He is one of the co-founders and Managing Director of Animonsta Studios, which is based in Cyberjaya. He is a graduate of Multimedia University, majoring in Film and Animation.

== Career ==
=== 2005–2009: Misi Mustahak and early career with Les' Copaque ===
On his final year project, Nizam, along with his close friends, Usamah Zaid Yasin, Safwan Karim and Nazrul Hadi Nazlan created Misi Mustahak, a short film about three old folks role-playing as spies. Nizam revealed that their project was tremendously well-received by their classmates.

After graduating from Multimedia University, Nizam's talent was recognized by Burhanuddin Md Radzi who previously worked at oil rig. Together, Burhanuddin with his wife, Ainon Ariff established Les' Copaque Production (named after a Malay phrase, Last Kopek) together with Usamah and himself with Safwan and Nazrul joined the studio later on. He later took his role as the director of Upin & Ipin series.

After three seasons, Nizam directed Malaysia's first 3D animated film, Geng: The Adventure Begins and co-written the story with Anas Abdul Aziz and Ainon Ariff. The film receives positive reviews and also receives Special Jury Award in Malaysia Film Festival.

=== 2009–2016: Animonsta Studios and breakthrough with BoBoiBoy ===
Nizam together with Safwan, Anas and Kee Yong Pin left Les' Copaque and established their own animation studio Animonsta Studios; better knows as MONSTA; where Nizam serves as the chief executive officer.

In 2011, Nizam created the series BoBoiBoy with Anas Abdul Aziz as his co-creator, Safwan as art director and Yong Pin as production director. The show became a big hit and gained massive popularity, both domestically and internationally in 44 different countries, among them being Singapore, Indonesia and Brunei.

In 2016, MONSTA released their first film BoBoiBoy: The Movie in theatres which aired on the 3rd of March, competing with big-name films such as Zootopia and Kung Fu Panda 3. Despite the competition, Boboiboy: The Movie successfully gained a box office of RM15.7 million domestically and RM20 million internationally. The film also won 'Best Animated Film' at the Malaysia Film Festival in 2018.

Boboiboy the series officially ended in 2016 after running for 3 seasons. The franchise later than continued with a sequel series titled and rebranded as 'Boboiboy Galaxy' which was officially released in 2017.

=== 2017–2019: BoBoiBoy Galaxy, second BoBoiBoy movie and Papa Pipi ===
BoBoiBoy Galaxy was created to continue BoBoiBoy's journey to find new elemental powers. As the series in production, Nizam and MONSTA announced second film was also in production. Teaser was released early in 2019 with Astro Shaw distributed the film for Malaysia and Brunei region who are known for their box-office franchise such as Polis Evo. The film hit the box-office for collecting RM30 million in 5 countries and award raining nominations such from New York Animation Film Awards, Florence Film Awards for best poster designer nomination and many more.

Besides the success of both of the series and film, Nizam creating Papa Pipi based on characters from BoBoiBoy series whose voiced by Nizam himself for Papa Zola character. The series told about Papa Zola's family in lives and made public service announcement to teach the audience what's right and what's wrong.

=== 2020–present: Mechamato and continued success ===
Nizam creating Mechamato for making people imagine to mechanize things. The series was announced early in 2020 in MONSTA's announcement of their new era; thus creating Power Sphera Universe. It was originated to be started as a film but was delayed due to COVID-19 pandemic. The series was released in December 2021 with Nizam appointed as writer with MONSTA's writers' room. The series received huge positive reaction for being creative and managed to distributed over 60 countries including Japan, South Korea and Portugal. The series later won Anime Fan Award in Tokyo Anime Award Festival to become the first foreign to win the award.

The film based on characters, Mechamato Movie co-produced by MONSTA and Astro Shaw; written and directed by Nizam released in 2022; 2 years after COVID-19 pandemic delay and enormous series popularity. The film received huge positive reaction either from Malaysia, Indonesia or Japan and huge box-office hit by collected RM35.88 million. The film was the first ever Malaysia animated film to screen in Japan's biggest cinema chain, Aeon Entertainment also was highlighted as one of Malaysian Buddy Duo films alongside Polis Evo 3 and Songlap.

== Personal life ==
Nizam Razak born in Johor Bahru, Johor and raised in Duyung, Central Malacca, Malacca. He has a younger sister. Nizam married Ezdiani Ahmad Fauzi in 2004 and blessed with three children, two boys and a girl.

== Filmography ==
Year	Title	Creator	Director	Writer	Producer	Voice role(s)	Note(s)
2007–2009	Upin & Ipin	No	Yes	Yes	No		Season 1–3
2009	Geng: The Adventure Begins	No	Yes	Story	No		Also as editor and special effect
2011–2016	BoBoiBoy	Yes	Yes	Yes	No	Papa Zola & Bago Go	
2016	BoBoiBoy The Movie	Yes	Yes	Yes	No	Papa Zola	Also as editor
2016–2025	BoBoiBoy Galaxy	Yes	No	Yes	No	Papa Zola & Bago Go	Also screenplay and story
2018–2022	Fly With Yaya	Yes	No	No	Executive		Creator of Yaya's character
2019	BoBoiBoy Movie 2	Yes	Yes	Yes	Yes	Papa Zola	
2019–present	Papa Pipi	Yes	No	Yes	Yes	Papa Zola	
2021–present	Mechamato: The Animated Series	Yes	No	Yes	Yes	Bula & Bago Go	Also as editor
2022	Mechamato Movie	Yes	Yes	Yes	Yes	Bula & Bago Go	
2025	Papa Zola The Movie	Yes	Yes	Yes	Yes	Papa Zola	
2027	BoBoiBoy Movie 3: Ghost of Gurlatan	Yes	Yes	Yes	Yes		

== Recognition ==
In June 2023, Nizam receive recognition from Tatler Asia as "Gen.T (Malaysia)" for creating Malaysia's most beloved animation (BoBoiBoy and Mechamato).

== See also ==
- Animonsta Studios
