= Nur Fathiah Diaz =

Malaysian voice actress

- نور فتحيه دياز
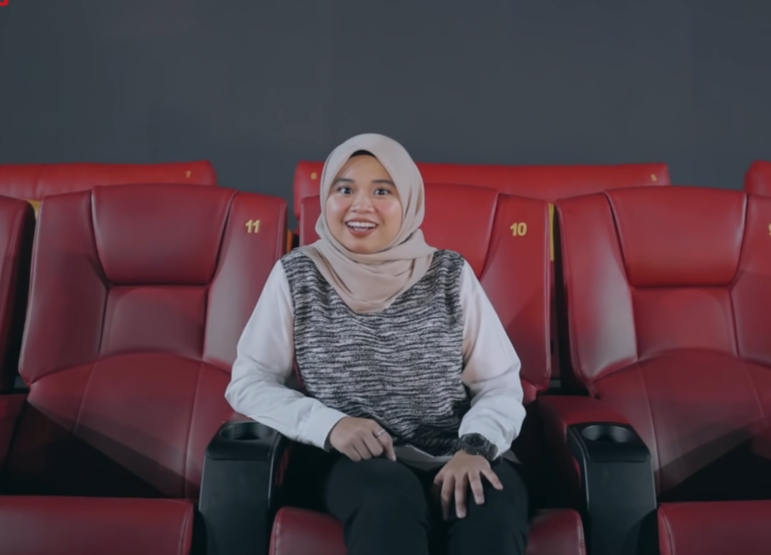
- Nur Fathiah before the filming of BoBoiBoy Movie 2
- Born: Nur Fathiah binti Diaz; 20 October 1999 (age 26); Kuala Lumpur, Malaysia
- Other name: Tiah
- Occupation: Voice actress
- Years active: 2005–present
- Television: BoBoiBoy; BoBoiBoy Galaxy
- Spouse: Muhammad Imran (m. 2023)

Nur Fathiah binti Diaz (Jawi: نور فتحيه بنت دياز; born 20 October 1999) is a Malaysian voice actress. She voiced twins Upin and Ipin from the Malaysian cartoon Upin & Ipin, also voicing them in the 2009 Malaysian 3D animated film Geng: Pengembaraan Bermula. In season four, she was replaced by Asyiela Putri and went on to the new project BoBoiBoy, voicing the same character as in the same title ever since. She also voiced Yuffie Kisaragi with Indonesian and Malaysian voice in Compilation of Final Fantasy VII.

== Filmography ==
=== Animation series ===
- Upin & Ipin (2007–2009) as Upin & Ipin
- BoBoiBoy (2011–2016) as Child BoBoiBoy
- BoBoiBoy Galaxy (2016–present) as Teen BoBoiBoy

=== Animated movies ===
- Geng: Pengembaraan Bermula (2009) as Upin and Ipin
- BoBoiBoy: The Movie (2016) as Child BoBoiBoy
- BoBoiBoy Movie 2 (2019) as Teen BoBoiBoy
- BoiBoiBoy Movie 3: Gur'latan (2026) as Teen BoBoiBoy
- Final Fantasy: Geng, The Adventure Begins (2027) as Yuffie Kisaragi

=== Video games ===
- FInal Fantasy VII Remake Intergrade (2027) as Yuffie Kisaragi

== Personal life ==
She is the daughter of Diaz bin Mohd Bahauddin and Azlinda binti Mohd Alias. Starting her career in the entertainment industry at the age of 8. Her younger brother, Muhammad Fathi Diaz have a role in BoBoiBoy as the voice of Ochobot. During one of fans meeting in Indonesia, a fan once ask her a question, ‘What is your biggest motive?’ to her answer because she wants to work hard and become one of the best. She has a husband named Muhammad Imran, and they have also been blessed with a child.
