= Mechamato =

Malaysian animated series by Nizam Razak

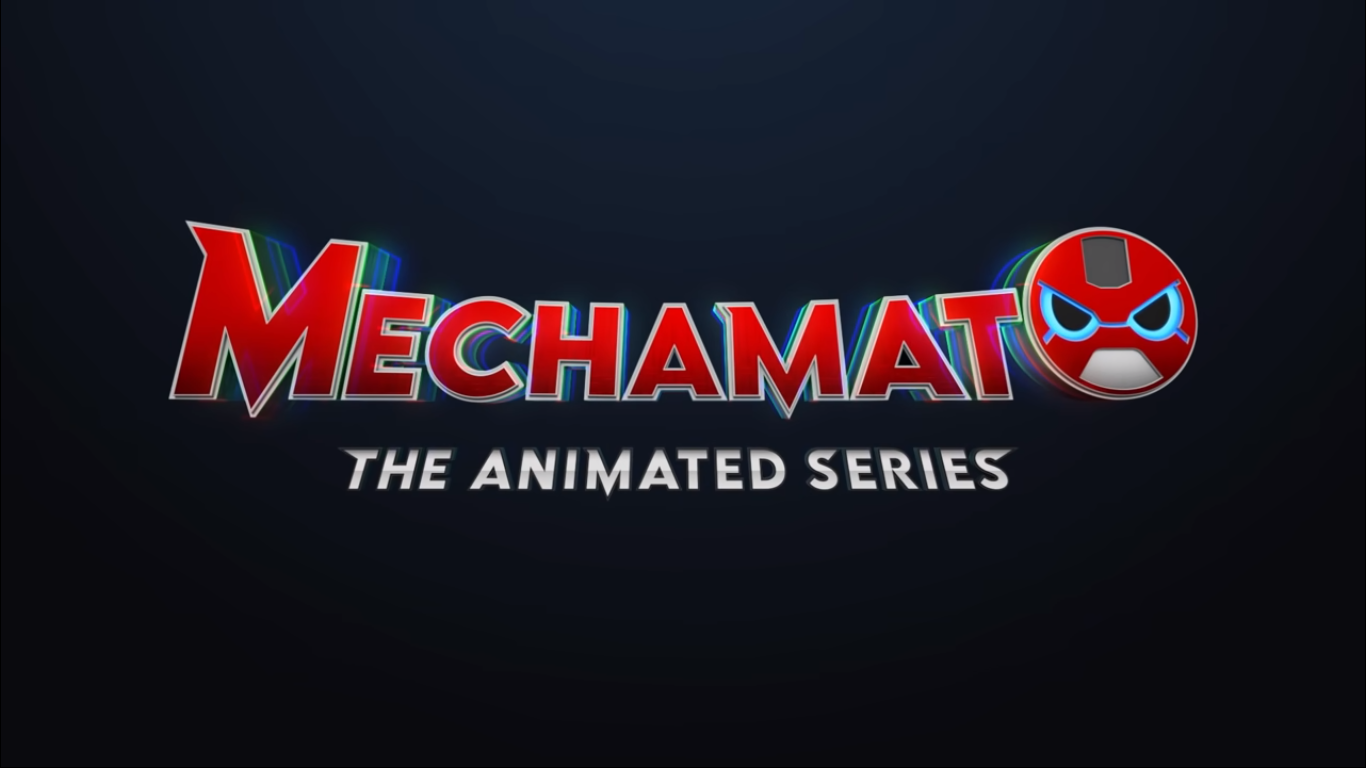
- Screenshot logo from music video
- Genre: Action; Comedy; Superhero; Science fiction; Coming-of-age
- Created by: Nizam Razak
- Developed by: Safwan Karim
- Written by: Nizam Razak; Anas Abdul Aziz; Raja Faisal Raja Ihsanuddin; Khairil Azwa; Syahmi Hafizuddin
- Directed by: Dzubir Mohammed Zakaria; Raja Nukman Raja Mohd Noordin; Hafiz Ashraf Saipul Islam
- Voices of: Armand Ezra; Adzlan Nazir; Ielham Iskandar; Marissa Balqis; Syabil Syamin
- Opening theme: Armoured Hero Mechamato
- Ending theme: Armoured Hero Mechamato
- Composers: Nur Sharmine Md Bakri; Mohd Rizdzuwan Md Jusoh
- Country of origin: Malaysia
- Original language: Malay
- No. of seasons: 4
- No. of episodes: 52 (list of episodes)

Production
- Executive producers: Kee Yong Pin; Noor Ezdiani Ahmad Fawzi
- Producers: Nizam Razak; Yap Ee Jean; Ferdiawan Gunarto; Rashdan Fahrirurazi
- Editors: Dzubir Mohammed Zakaria; Raja Nukman Raja Mohd Noordin
- Running time: 23–24 mins
- Production company: Animonsta Studios

Original release
- Network: TV3; TV9; Cartoon Network; Netflix; Astro Prima
- Release: 4 December 2021 – present

Related
- BoBoiBoy; BoBoiBoy Galaxy

Mechamato (Note: Also known as Mechamato The Animated Series) (Jawi: ميكاماتو) is a Malaysian animated series produced by Animonsta Studios, focusing on a boy named Amato and his partner robot MechaBot, who fight against bad robots. Mechamato is a part of the BoBoiBoy franchise and the series canonically takes place before BoBoiBoy and BoBoiBoy Galaxy.

Mechamato: The Animated Series premiered on Cartoon Network Asia from 4 December 2021 to 26 February 2022 for the first season. The second season premiered on the 5 December 2022.

Mechamato Movie, which is the prequel to the animated series, has been released in Malaysia and Brunei on 8 December 2022.

Netflix released the third season on 16 September 2024, and the fourth season in two batches: 10 episodes on 6 September 2025 and 3 episodes on 16 September 2025.

== Premise ==
=== Setting ===
Mechamato is set in the fictional Malaysian town of Kota Hilir, inspired by Bandar Hilir in Malacca City in the real world, which is also the creator's hometown. Mechamato features the uniqueness of Malaysian culture such as silat, the Peranakan culture and local food, but is embroidered with futuristic elements such as robots and spaceships.

=== Plot ===
A boy named Amato finds a prison spaceship containing bad robots that have crashed on Earth. One such robot is the MechaBot which has the ability to mechanize everyday objects into high-tech devices. Amato manages to outsmart MechaBot and eventually becomes the master of MechaBot. Since then, MechaBot and Amato have started working together to find and capture the bad robots.

== Characters ==
Amato / Mechamato
Voiced by: Alexander Machado (English); Armand Ezra (Malay)
A kind, creative and imaginative boy who becomes the master of MechaBot after he manages to outsmart MechaBot.
MechaBot
Voiced by: Alex Teixeira (English); Adzlan Nazir (Malay)
A Power Sphera which is the most powerful destructive robot in the galaxy. It has the power to combine any item with its Mechanize power. However, it has to obey Amato's instructions because Amato has become his new master.
Pian
Voiced by: Katherine Clare Clavelo (English); Ielham Iskandar (Malay)
Amato's good friend who is very rich and a clever creator. He is the only one who understands Amato's bad paintings.
Mara / Maskmara
Voiced by: Katherine Clare Clavelo (English); Marissa Balqis (S1–S3), Nur Nisa (S4) (Malay)
A female friend of Amato who is a wheelchair user. She is a person with an artistic soul, and also independent, brave and does not give up. She always helps Amato and his friends in solving problems. In the movie, her real name was Tamara. In season 3, she later reveals to be a new Maskmana under young Maskmana program.
Deep
Voiced by: Daniel Cortes (English); Syabil Syamin (Malay)
Amato's friend who is always happy-go-lucky. He loves to play games and has high creativity, which is higher than Amato himself.
Tok Aba
Voiced by: Christopher Leigh Jahn (English); Anas Abdul Aziz (Malay)
Amato's father.
Bula
Voiced by: Hernán Chavarro (S1-S3), Jacob Takanashi (S4) (English); Nizam Razak (Malay)
A bully who goes to the same school as Amato.
Bili
Voiced by: Hernán Chavarro (S1), Travis Roig (S2-S3), Jacob Takanashi (S4) (English); Muhammad Azrul Fazlan Hamdan (Malay)
Bula's minion who goes to the same school as Amato.
Mr. Jamie
Voiced by Jason Michael Kesser (English); Mohd Syabil Syamin (Malay)
He is a strict teacher at Kota Hilir School where Amato is a student.

== Production ==
Mechamato is created by Animonsta Studios which is known for the BoBoiBoy series. The series itself is an indirect prequel for BoBoiBoy when the main character, Amato is revealed as the father of BoBoiBoy, which is under the Power Sphera Universe. The idea for this series came in 2018 when Animonsta Studios pitch the idea to Cartoon Network. The studio wanted a robot-buddy story that represented a child-like imagination that could be associated with each child, such as making a robot costume out of a cardboard box. The creator Nizam Razak wanted Mechamato to inspire children to imagine possibilities, to use technology responsibly. He revealed that this idea came while moving house, where his children were playing with boxes and imagined being in a tank. This reminds him of being in a box as a child, pretending to be driving in a car. The thing sparks the idea to create a 'Power Sphera' that can combine with the boxes and turn into a high-tech car or tank, who then noticed that the idea was not limited to the boxes only. As for the name Amato, it was inspired by two things: Amat, which is a common Malay name, and the use of 'O' at the end of the name of a drink that Malaysians only add sugar without milk, such as Kopi O. He and his creative team initially envisioned Amato and MechaBot as a duo of superheroes riding futuristic motorcycles and fighting super villains bigger than themselves. The concepts were sketched out five years before the series was released and they look simpler than it turns out. Based on the initial concept, their animator partners and friends in Japan, Hong Kong, Singapore and France gave positive feedback.

The grown-up Amato wearing the MechaBot suit, who kept an old photo of him with infant BoBoiBoy and another photo of him sending BoBoiBoy to the train station, was featured in the post-credit scene of BoBoiBoy Movie 2, with the studio giving the hint for this series. The extended version of the first episode of the BoBoiBoy series was also released on Monsta official YouTube channel on 14 March 2021, adding a new scene of Amato sending his son BoBoiBoy to the train station at the beginning of the episode.

The name of the series was revealed as early as 2019 when Animonsta Studios announced the series on a video for their 2020 plans. The first look of the series is revealed on 8 April 2020 when the first teaser is released on Monsta official YouTube channel.

== Media ==
=== Movie ===
Mechamato Movie, was originally planned to be released in 2020, but postponed to 2021. The official trailer was released on 1 January 2021, intended for the release of 2021. However, due to uncertainty over the COVID-19 pandemic situation and vaccination, the film was postponed several times, from November or December 2020 to March 2021 to May or June 2021 and finally until end 2021. However, plans to release the film earlier than the animated series were cancelled due to the COVID-19 pandemic and the animated series had already been developed according to schedule which is set to be released in December 2021. On 15 September 2022, it has been announced that the movie will be released on 8 December 2022 in Malaysian cinemas. The final trailer and the official poster were revealed on 8 November 2022, a month before the release.

Second film titled Mechamato Movie 2 has already planned in 2023 after huge box office administration in late 2022 by collecting RM35.88 million in Malaysia with Astro Shaw set to continue co-produced the film.

The movie was also screened in other diplomatic events held by Malaysian government. In 2024, The High Commission of Malaysia in Kenya held the screening of Mechamato Movie in Nairobi, Kenya to Kenyan public. During the same year, Malaysian Embassy in Tokyo and Animonsta Studio organized a special premiere screening in Japan.

=== Animated series ===
Mechamato was announced to be broadcast on Cartoon Network Asia under WarnerMedia for Adult Swim the Asia-Pacific region. It was premiered on 4 December 2021, with a special sneak-peek episode on 6 November 2021. Although the series was released before Mechamato Movie, the timeline of the series is after the movie. The opening theme, titled "Armored Hero Mechamato!", is composed by Nur Sharmine Md Bakri and performed by Shah from the indie band Modescape for Malay version and Nil Cardoso for the English version, which is recorded in the US. The series is available in 21 countries with dubbing in English, Malay, Indonesian, Cantonese, Vietnamese, Mandarin, Tagalog and Thai for their respective countries on 4 December 2021. For Korean, it was available starting 11 December 2021 in South Korea, while for Japanese, it will be available starting 27 March 2022 in Japan. The show premiered in India via Cartoon Network on January 15, 2023. In Portugal, the series premiered on SIC K on 3 September 2022. For outside Asia, Jetpack Distribution has acquired worldwide rights, which includes season one.

On 23 June 2022, it is announced that Mechamato: The Animated Series is currently streaming on HBO Go. For the Malaysian market, the series is also broadcast on Astro Prima, starting 16 July 2022 where it would be aired each Saturday and Sunday at 7 pm.

On 15 September 2022, alongside the movie date release reveal, it is announced that it will be released on various platforms before the movie release. For streaming platforms, it will be released on Netflix for the Asia-Pacific region on 1 October, YouTube on 7 October and Vidio on 21 October. For the TV release, it will be premiered on TV9 on 3 October, MNCTV on 30 October and TV3 on 4 December. For Netflix release, it is available in 6 languages, namely Malay, English, Thai, Mandarin, Korean and Japanese.

On 11 November 2022, it is confirmed that there would be a second season, in which the creator mentioned that they already had submitted all 13 episodes to Cartoon Network. The second season premiered on 5 December 2022 on Cartoon Network in Malaysia, Indonesia and the Philippines, and on 10 December 2022 in Japan, while for South Korea, Australia, New Zealand, Vietnam, Thailand, Taiwan and Hong Kong, MONSTA is still waiting for the schedule.

On 31 October 2023, it was announced that four new seasons and a second movie are expected to premiere in future.

On 7 May 2024, it was announced that the Mechamato series would air its second part, titled Gear 2, after season 4. It was later confirmed that Gear 2 would begin with the second film and consist of four seasons.

On 2 August 2024, a third season was announced in which the creator mentioned that they already had submitted all 13 episodes to Netflix and Youtube. The third season premiered on 16 September 2024 in over 30 Asia-Pacific countries, including Japan, South Korea, India, Australia, and New Zealand on Netflix. On the same day, the first episode was also uploaded on Monsta's official YouTube channel, with subsequent episodes released weekly.

The fourth season was announced on 22 August 2025. The first ten episodes were released on Netflix on 6 September 2025, with the remaining three episodes released on 16 September 2025. Also on 6 September, Monsta uploaded the first episode to its official YouTube channel, with subsequent episodes released weekly.

In May 2025, the series is also being re-broadcast in Australia via Australian national TV broadcaster, ABC Australia. The show is available on ABC Australia's linear television channel, ABC Entertains and their TV-radio streaming service, ABC iView until August 2028, according to the data via Freeview Australia.

By September 2026, Vietnam Television's online television platform, VTVGo, provides season 2 and 3 of Mechamato on their platform as available contents in the several additional television content bundles: MSKY Extra Bundle, MSKY + VTVGo Plus and One VTV Bundle as MSKY is the Vietnamese company managing Cartoon Network Asia's Vietnam feed and content for various Vietnamese cable television service companies, including Vietnam Television's owned VTVCab (vi).

=== Video games ===
Mechamato Robot Battle, an immersive game experience on Roblox, has been announced in October 2022. It is an online gaming space where players can explore the vast open world of Kota Hilir, as seen on Mechamato: The Animated Series.

=== Diplomatic mission ===
Besides the movie screening held by Malaysian government, Mechamato was also chosen as the official mascot for Malaysia's section during World Expo 2025 event in Osaka, Japan. Mechamato appeared alongside with YAB Dato' Seri Amirudin Shari, the First Minister of Selangor (also referred in Malaysian as Dato’ Menteri Besar Selangor), in a video promoting investment opportunity in Selangor.

== Reception ==
=== Reviews ===
The series received positive feedback in general, in particularly for its animation, action and comedy. The series also caught the attention of fans in Japan after it aired on Cartoon Network Japan and Netflix Japan, where positive reactions could be seen on Twitter.

Mechamato has been nominated for the Anime Fan Award at the 2023 Tokyo Anime Awards Festival, in which the highest position ever achieved by this series in that category is 3rd place. For second round, Mechamato managed to beat Spy × Family, One Piece Film: Red, Extreme Hearts and many more to steal the first place. Mechamato also peaked at No. 2 for Top 10 TV Show on Netflix Malaysia, and managed to break into Top 10 Kids Show on Netflix for Indonesia, Singapore and South Korea.

=== In public figure ===
The film based on the series, Mechamato Movie was appeared in the 5th minute of Astro Shaw 2024 film on the background, The Experts when Luqman Hariz, an Astro Awani news anchor reporting the news of RM40 million worth of gold missing after being stolen by family.
