= Monsta Studios =

Malaysian animation company

Monsta Studios Sdn. Bhd.
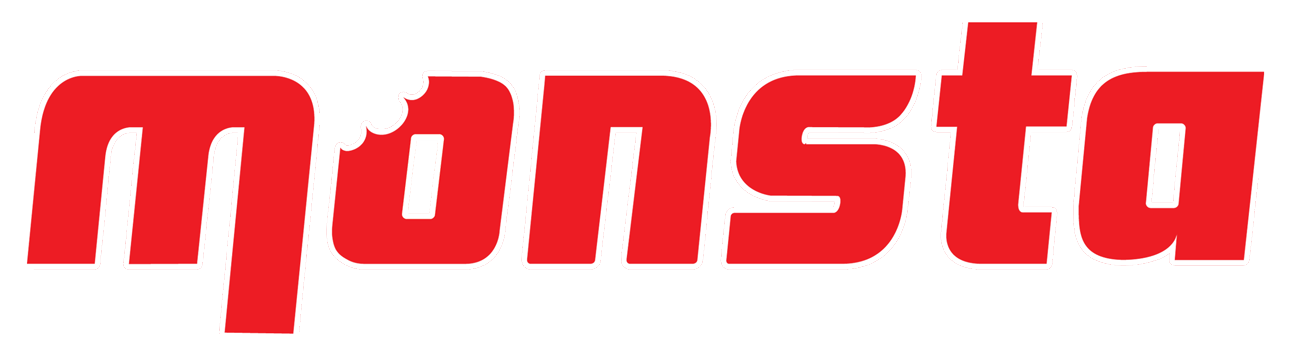
- Logo used since 2014
- Formerly: Animonsta Studios
- Type: Private
- Industry: Mass media; Entertainment
- Founded: 15 September 2009; 17 years ago
- Founder: Mohd Nizam Abd Razak; Muhammad Anas Abdul Aziz; Mohd Safwan Abd Karim; Kee Yong Pin
- Headquarters: Cyberjaya, Selangor, Malaysia
- Area served: Worldwide
- Key people: Mohd Nizam Abd Razak (Co-founder & Managing Director); Mohd Safwan Abd Karim (Co-founder & Executive Director); Muhammad Anas Abdul Aziz; Co-founder & Creative Director); Kee Yong Pin (Co-founder & Operations Director)
- Products: CGI animation
- Brands: BoBoiBoy; Mechamato; The King of Fighters: Destiny
- Website: monsta.com

Monsta Studios Sdn. Bhd. (formerly Animonsta Studios) is a Malaysian animation production company that produces creative and visual content for the Malaysian and international market. The company was founded on 15 September 2009 by four former Les' Copaque Production staffs – Mohd Nizam Abd Razak, Muhammad Anas Abdul Aziz, Mohd Safwan Abd Karim and Kee Yong Pin.

Situated in Cyberjaya, Monsta was awarded MSC Malaysia status in 2011.

== History ==
Former logo as Animonsta Studios, used from 2009 to 2014, features a little green monster named Onsta biting into the letter 'O'

The founders of Animonsta have experience in creating animated 3D films and blockbuster animations. Through combined knowledge and previously gained experience, they founded Animonsta Studios with the goal of bringing wholesome content with a local touch to both local and international audiences.

The studio's first animated series, BoBoiBoy is about BoBoiBoy and his friends' adventures in battling aliens who are trying to invade Earth for its cocoa beans. In the sneak peek of the series, BoBoiBoy was formerly named BoBoi, but later renamed to BoBoiBoy instead. The original run of BoBoiBoy consisted of 3 seasons with a total of 52 episodes. This was followed by the full-length theatrical release, BoBoiBoy: The Movie, and later a rebranding of the series titled BoBoiBoy Galaxy which features the same but a slightly older cast of characters in a larger interplanetary setting. While the franchise is aimed at children and teenagers, the content is suitable for the entire family to enjoy together.

Since 2014, the company changed its name to Monsta, but the Animonsta Studios brand continued to be used as the legal name of the company until December 2024.

The company later released BoBoiBoy Movie 2, and an original new animated series titled Mechamato.

== Media ==
=== Animated series ===
- BoBoiBoy (2011–2016)
- BoBoiBoy Galaxy (2016–present)
- The King of Fighters: Destiny (2017–2018)
- Fly With Yaya (2018–2022)
- Mechamato (2021–present)
- Papa Pipi (2019–present)
- Papa Pipi Terpaling Puasa (2025)
- Papa Pipi: The Series (2026–present)

=== Movies ===
- BoBoiBoy The Movie (2016)
- BoBoiBoy Movie 2 (2019)
- Mechamato Movie (2022)
- Papa Zola The Movie (2025)

==== Upcoming ====
- BoBoiBoy Movie 3: Ghost of Gurlatan (2027)
- Mechamato Movie 2 (2028)
- Papa Zola The Movie 2
- BoBoiBoy x Mechamato Movie

=== Comics ===
- BoBoiBoy: Pertarungan Terakhir (2016)
- BoBoiBoy: Sfera Kuasa (2016)
- BoBoiBoy Galaxy (2016–2023)
- BoBoiBoy Movie 2: Evolusi Kuasa (2019)

=== Short specials ===
These short specials were released on the occasion of Ramadan and Eid ul fitr.

- Hadiah Raya BoBoiBoy (2018)
- Kebenaran Raya (2019)
- Memori Eidulfitri (2021)
- Kembali Aidilfitri (2022)
- Temani Raya (2023)
- Famili Papa Pipi Pindah (2024)
