= BoBoiBoy The Movie =

2016 Malaysian animated film

BoBoiBoy: The Movie
- Malaysian theatrical poster
- Malay: BoBoiBoy: Sfera Kuasa
- Directed by: Nizam Razak
- Written by: Nizam Razak; Anas Abdul Aziz
- Based on: BoBoiBoy by Nizam Razak
- Starring: Nur Fathiah Diaz; Anas Abdul Aziz; Dzubir Mohamed Zakaria; Wong Wai Kay; Azman Zulkiply; Nur Sarah Alisya; Yap Ee Jean
- Music by: Yuri Wong
- Production company: Animonsta Studios
- Distributed by: Primeworks Studio
- Release date: 3 March 2016
- Running time: 102 minutes
- Country: Malaysia
- Language: Malay
- Budget: RM5 million
- Box office: RM20 million (Asia Region)

BoBoiBoy: The Movie is a 2016 Malaysia superhero comedy animated film directed by Nizam Razak, who also co-wrote the screenplay with Anas Abdul Aziz. It is Animonsta Studios' first feature film, based on their animated TV series BoBoiBoy. Featuring the characters, BoBoiBoy and his friends, the film follows the team as they go on an adventure to a mysterious island to find Ochobot, who was kidnapped by a gang of alien Power Sphere hunters known as the Tengkotak so that they could locate an ancient Power Sphere that predates Ochobot.

BoBoiBoy The Movie was released on 3 March 2016 in Malaysia, and 13 April 2016 in Indonesia. It received positive reviews and was a box office success in the region, having grossed around RM20 million. A follow-up titled BoBoiBoy Movie 2, featuring the same original characters but older was released on 8 August 2019.

== Plot ==
A gang of Kubulus Power Sphere hunters, the Tengkotak, led by Bora Ra, unsuccessfully attempt to capture Klamkabot, a first-generation Power Sphere capable of teleportation. While camping with his friends and Ochobot, BoBoiBoy sees a police chase and leaves to apprehend a group of robbers, nearly forgetting the camping trip. Meanwhile, Bora Ra threatens to expel Yoyo Oo from his spaceship for failing to find Klamkabot, but Yoyo Oo discovers Ochobot, a ninth-generation Power Sphere, and lies that he has found Klamkabot.

BoBoiBoy returns late to camp, upsetting his friends, who leave him behind. He meets Papa Zola, who persuades him to go squid fishing. The next day, Bora Ra and Gaga Naz demand Ochobot from BoBoiBoy but capture him themselves, while Adu Du and Probe secretly board their spaceship.

BoBoiBoy and his friends ask Papa Zola to help locate Ochobot on a floating island. They find a clue leading towards a lighthouse, while Adu Du encounters Kiki Ta and develops a crush on her. Before departing, Bora Ra gives Adu Du and Probe the Kurita, a small squid that grows when exposed to water. Zola discovers that Adu Du is approaching and questions him about Ochobot. They pursue the enlarged Kurita and defeat it, while Yoyo Oo monitors Ochobot. Klamkabot suddenly attacks Ochobot, disrupting its transmission, prompting Bora Ra to release a legged shark creature called J-Rex.

Ying finds Ochobot apparently under Klamkabot's control. BoBoiBoy attacks Klamkabot, suspecting he is a member of the Tengkotak, but Ochobot stops him. Klamkabot explains that the Power Spheres are robots created by the Kubulus aliens of Ata Ta Tiga. He scattered them throughout the galaxy to prevent their misuse. Bora Ra discovers them, but they escape with Klamkabot's help.

At the camp, Papa Zola captures Adu Du and Probe and falsely claims that the Tengkotak kidnapped BoBoiBoy and his friends. Klamkabot takes BoBoiBoy's group to the Power Sphere Lab, where new Spheres are created, but Bora Ra and Gaga Naz capture him after a brief fight, unaware that BoBoiBoy's group are hiding beneath a platform. Adu Du and Probe trick Zola into searching for them, but J-Rex attacks. Zola saves the creature, which then follows them and forces Adu Du and Probe to accompany him. Their attempt to infiltrate the Tengkotak's spaceship ends with Gaga Naz and Kiki Ta capturing them.

Meanwhile, BoBoiBoy's group reach the Power Sphere Lab, where Ochobot is upgraded with a new appearance and teleportation abilities. Under interrogation, Klamkabot reveals that he transferred his teleportation power to Ochobot and intends to escape, although BoBoiBoy disagrees with his plan. Bora Ra takes Zola, Adu Du and Probe hostage in exchange for Ochobot.

Bora Ra destroys Ochobot to obtain its teleportation power. Before dying, however, Ochobot grants BoBoiBoy's group enhanced elemental powers, upgrading his Fire and Water abilities into Blaze and Ice. After J-Rex rescues Adu Du and Probe from Yoyo Oo and Kiki Ta, Bora Ra creates a black hole to consume BoBoiBoy's group. He attempts to escape but discovers that Adu Du had tricked Yoyo Oo into providing false coordinates, sending the Tengkotak's spaceship closer towards the black hole. BoBoiBoy launches Bora Ra into it, killing him, while Klamkabot sacrifices himself to revive Ochobot and restore its teleportation ability.

Afterwards, Zola introduces J-Rex to his friends. Cici Ko, whose real name is Koko Ci, reveals that he had foiled the Tengkotak's plans while spying on them, then drives away in their spaceship.

== Cast ==
- Nur Fathiah Diaz as BoBoiBoy
- Nur Sarah Alisya as Yaya
- Yap Ee Jean as Ying
- Dzubir Mohammed Zakaria as Gopal
- Wong Wai Kay as Fang
- Muhammad Fathi Diaz as Ochobot and Terra
- Anas Abdul Aziz as Yoyo Oo, Tok Aba, Probe, Adu Du, Cici Ko, and Uncle Burger
- Nizam Razak as Papa Zola
- Usamah Widiatmoko as Klamkabot
- Azman Zulkiply as Bora Ra
- Mohammad Azmir Selamat as Gaga Naz
- Chan Su Ling as Kiki Ta
- Nadia Nazir as Coral
- Woi Pak Lin as Oake
- Fara Fauzana as an old lady and a news reporter

=== English dub ===
- Marina Tan as BoBoiBoy
- Ilhan Mohd Shahrizal as Ochobot and Terra
- Ryan Lee Bhaskaran as Gopal
- Fairuz Arfa Ariff Syah as Yaya and Hanna
- Chan Su Ling as Ying and Kiki Ta
- Wong Wai Kay as Fang
- Anas Abdul Aziz as Tok Aba, Adu Du, Probe, Yoyo Oo, Cici Ko, and Papa Zola
- Kevin Adrian Barnaby as Klamkabot
- Azman Zulkiply as Bora Ra
- Hasnul Hadi Samsudin as Gaga Naz
- Wong Pak Lin as Oake
- Nadia Nazir as Coral

== Production ==
The film was originally titled BoBoiBoy: Power Sphere during production. Nizam Razak stated that this movie cost RM5 million, and he described it as the 'significant value'. The production for the film takes two years time with a staff of 70 animators. The process of inserting actor voice was started since the movie started its production until it finished at the end of 2015. This film also received funding from National Film Development Corporation Malaysia (FINAS), Multimedia Development Corporation (MDeC), and Malaysia Animation Creative Content Centre (MAC3). The original duration of the movie is 160 minutes, but it has been shortened to 100 minutes after several scenes were cut to fulfil the standard for a children's movie. He also stated that this film will include more action and comedy than the TV series.

== Music ==
"Masih Di Sini"

Single by Bunkface

from the album Bunkface X
- Released: 7 March 2016
- Recorded: 2015
- Genre: Pop
- Length: 4:01
- Label: Bunkface Production Sdn Bhd
- Songwriter: Sam Bunkface
- Producer: Animonsta Studios

Bunkface singles chronology
"Darah Muda" (2015)	"Masih Di Sini" (2016)	"Warnai Dunia" (2016)

=== Soundtrack ===
"Di Bawah Langit Yang Sama"

Single by D'Masiv

from the album D'Masiv
- Released: 22 January 2016
- Recorded: 2016
- Genre: Pop
- Length: 3:54
- Label: Musica Studio's
- Songwriter: Iksan Skuter
- Producer: Animonsta Studios

D'Masiv singles chronology
"Abadi" (2016)	"Di Bawah Langit Yang Sama" (2016)	"Satu-Satunya" (2016)

The movie has two original soundtracks, which are "Masih Di Sini" by Bunkface and "Di Bawah Langit Yang Sama" by D'Masiv. The former is used in trailers and mostly in battle scenes, while the latter is used for the movie's closing credits.

Di Bawah Langit Yang Sama was first released to the public on iTunes on 22 January 2016 while its music video in Monsta Studio's YouTube channel on 5 February 2016. Masih Di Sini's music video was released on 2 March 2016, one day before the movie's release in Malaysia, while its iTunes release came five days later.

== Release ==
Animonsta Studios announced in June 2013 that the project Power Sphere that was expected for release in 2014. The project announced featured official artwork of Klamkabot and BoBoiBoy. The project was later delayed to the end of 2015, where Animonsta Studios released the movie's official teaser on YouTube in February 2015. Seven months later, Animonsta Studios released the official trailer for the movie on their official YouTube channel.

On 21 December 2015, Animonsta Studios officially announced the release date for Malaysian cinemas to be 3 March 2016 in their official Facebook account, whereas the Indonesian release date was announced to be on 13 April 2016 nine days later. In February 2016, Animonsta Studios released their second official trailer on YouTube.

Animonsta Studios plans to promote this movie in the 2016 Tokyo Anime Award Festival in March 2016. There are discussions on bringing the movie to Kazakhstan, and there are also some plans to bring the film to nearby countries such as Thailand, the Philippines, Vietnam, and Cambodia where there are audiences expressing interest in this film. The movie was shown in 115 cinemas in Malaysia, 100 in Indonesia, two in Brunei, and two in Singapore. For the Indonesian market, the movie was screened in CGV Blitz, Cinemaxx, and Platinum.

After the success in Malaysia and Indonesia, BoBoiBoy The Movie is set to be shown in South Korean cinemas on 100 screens across the country in the first quarter of 2017. The movie started showing in South Korean cinemas on 1 March 2017 in over 100 cinemas in South Korea including Lotte, CGV and Megabox.

An English dub of the movie premiered on Disney Channel Asia on 21 August 2016.

It aired in India on 27 May 2018 on Hungama TV in Hindi, Tamil and Telugu.

=== Home media ===
The film was released on DVD to the Malaysian market on 28 May 2016 by Rusa Music and Animonsta Studios.

For the Indonesian market, Animonsta Studios has collaborated with KFC Indonesia to sell the official DVD throughout Indonesia. The fourth episode of BoBoiBoy Galaxy was exclusively included in the Indonesian DVD.

=== Online streaming ===
On 9 December 2018, Animonsta announced on their official Facebook page that the entire full-length movie is available for streaming on the company's YouTube channel. The movie is also available on Netflix.

== Reception ==
Days of screening	Cumulative sales in Malaysia
1 day (3 March)	RM 500,000 (US$120,000)
2 days (4 March)	RM 1 million (US$240,000)
3 days (5 March)	RM 2 million (US$490,000)
4 days (6 March)	RM 3.5 million (US$860,000)
9 days (11 March)	RM 5 million (US$1.25 million)
11 days (13 March)	RM 8 million (US$1.95 million)
12 days (14 March)	RM 8.5 million (US$2.1 million)
14 days (16 March)	RM 10 million (US$2.47 million)
15 days (17 March)	RM 10.5 million (US$2.59 million)
17 days (19 March)	RM 13 million (US$3.2 million)
20 days (22 March)	RM 14 million (US$3.49 million)
25 days (27 March)	RM 15 million (US$3.73 million)
56 days (27 April)	RM 15.77 million (US$3.74 million)

Animonsta Studios targeted RM25 million (US$6 million) for this movie, with RM12-13 million (US$3–3.2 million) target for Malaysia and Brunei markets, and RM12-13 million (US$4–4.24 million) target for Indonesian market. After four days, the movie earned a very high value which is RM 3.5 million. After 11 days, this movie has made its name as the highest-grossing Malaysia animated movie, beating Geng: The Adventure Begins which grossed RM6.3 million, before being overtaken by Upin & Ipin: Keris Siamang Tunggal in 2019. The movie achieved their target after 17 days in Malaysia as they have collected RM13 million, exceeding their target for the Malaysian market. The movie was shown in Malaysian cinemas for 56 days. This movie received very positive reviews from audiences and critics alike.

For the Indonesian market, the movie managed to earn more than 5 billion rupiahs (RM 1.48 million) after 12 days.

== Comic adaptation ==
This movie has been adapted into comic titled BoBoiBoy: Sfera Kuasa.

== Awards ==
Festival Filem Malaysia 28

Award	Result
Best Animated Feature Film	Won
