= BoBoiBoy Movie 2 =

2019 Malaysian animated film

- Official theatrical poster
- Directed by: Nizam Razak
- Written by: Nizam Razak; Anas Abdul Aziz
- Based on: BoBoiBoy by Nizam Razak
- Starring: Nur Fathiah Diaz; Fadhli Mohd Rawi; Wong Pak Lin; Nizam Razak; Ieesya Isandra; Anas Abdul Aziz; Dzubir Mohammed Zakaria; Nur Sarah Alisya Zainal Rashid; Yap Ee Jean; Wong Wai Kay
- Music by: Yuri Wong
- Production company: Animonsta Studios
- Distributed by: Astro Shaw
- Release date: 8 August 2019
- Running time: 110 minutes
- Country: Malaysia
- Language: Malay
- Budget: MYR 7 million
- Box office: MYR 30 million (US$7.4 million)

BoBoiBoy Movie 2 is a 2019 Malaysian animated superhero comedy film produced by Animonsta Studios. Directed by Nizam Razak, who also co-wrote the screenplay with Anas Abdul Aziz, it is a follow-up to BoBoiBoy The Movie and the first season of the series BoBoiBoy Galaxy. The film follows BoBoiBoy and his friends as they fight an ancient villain named Retak’ka, who plans to absorb BoBoiBoy's elemental powers.

BoBoiBoy Movie 2 was simultaneously released in Malaysia, Indonesia, Brunei, and Singapore on 8 August 2019, and in Vietnam on 30 August 2019. A follow-up titled BoBoiBoy Movie 3: Ghost of Gurlatan, based on the Gur'latan arc from the comic version of the second season of BoBoiBoy Galaxy, is slated for release in 2027.

== Plot ==
On planet Saharu, Gopal and BoBoiBoy retrieve the Power Sphere EggaBot from a penguin monster's nest. Gopal drops one of its eggs, awakening the monster. Adu Du and Probe steal EggaBot, prompting Fang and Yaya to intervene. Before returning, BoBoiBoy rescues Adu Du and Probe.

In space, crystal miners discover Retak'ka, the first elemental master, who was sealed 100 years earlier inside an asteroid. After completing their missions, BoBoiBoy's crew visit Tok Aba's Kokotiam and meet their relatives, including Papa Zola's daughter Pipi Zola. Retak'ka escapes with a fragment of his powers and forces the miners to take him to TAPOPS. BoBoiBoy invites Fang to dinner at Aba's home, while Zola and Gopal take Pipi aboard Zola's spaceship to show her EggaBot. Pipi activates EggaBot, preventing Adu Du and Probe from stealing it.

Retak'ka attacks TAPOPS Station, prompting Koko Ci to send an emergency message with coordinates to planet Quabaq. BoBoiBoy has OchoBot teleport the group to the station, where Retak'ka demands his stolen powers and defeats Fang, Yaya and Ying before draining BoBoiBoy's Solar, Thunderstorm, Cyclone and Thorn elements. Gopal rescues BoBoiBoy as Koko Ci orders them to save themselves and find Hang Kasa. Zola teleports his spaceship to Quabaq, where it crashes in a caustic swamp, while the miners detonate explosives around TAPOPS Station.

On Quabaq, BoBoiBoy and OchoBot recover Koko Ci's damaged message before evacuating with Gopal and Zola, who has inadvertently brought Pipi with him; Adu Du and Probe had escaped. When the group encounter light-sensitive Kang Kong sloths, BoBoiBoy tries distracting them using Blaze, since Retak'ka has stolen his Solar element. Kasa rescues them and offers to train BoBoiBoy and Gopal against Retak'ka, his former apprentice.

Retak'ka drains planet Gur'Latan, killing its soldiers. After rescuing the survivors on TAPOPS Station, Captain Kaizo investigates Gur'Latan with his brother Fang and discovers that Retak'ka has been draining planets to increase his power. They track him to Bayugan, where Ying warns the inhabitants. Retak'ka then attacks planet Rimbara, forcing Kaizo's group to evacuate its Cendawa alien tribe. Maskmana deploys ArmoBot to help Fang, Yaya and Ying resist Retak'ka as he drains the planet.

After completing their training, BoBoiBoy and Gopal are charged by Kasa, who traps them in crystal when they cannot pay and takes back BoBoiBoy's Quake element. Pipi suspects Kasa has lied after Zola sees OchoBot powering his house, but Kasa reveals that he is the master of the Crystal element. He plays the repaired message, proving Koko Ci never instructed BoBoiBoy to train under Kasa. BoBoiBoy has Kasa explain his past with Retak'ka: they met on planet Gugura, a vast landfill, where they discovered elemental Power Spheres. Retak'ka greedily took five additional elements and coveted Kasa's Crystal power, so Kasa used OchoBot to drain his elements and imprison him in crystal.

Realising Kasa had lured him to Quabaq using BoBoiBoy's location, Retak'ka challenges him to a duel on Earth after learning from Fang, Ying and Yaya that Earth possesses the seven elements he needs. Pipi frees BoBoiBoy and Gopal with EggaBot, allowing BoBoiBoy to fight Retak'ka. Kasa intervenes when Retak'ka attempts to kill him, but Retak'ka then drains Kasa's Crystal power. The Zolas, Adu Du and Probe defeat the miners, freeing Fang, Yaya and Ying. Remembering that splitting his powers weakens him, BoBoiBoy fuses Ice and Blaze into FrostFire. Gopal throws OchoBot to him, enabling BoBoiBoy to drain Retak'ka's Crystal power. When Fang, Yaya and Ying overpower Retak'ka, he destroys a nearby dam. BoBoiBoy drains Retak'ka's remaining elements and launches him into space as Supra, formed by fusing Thunderstorm and Solar, before collapsing into the river, where his friends rescue him.

The group recuperate at a field hospital with their families, while the rescued Cendawa tribe help rebuild Earth. Kasa acknowledges BoBoiBoy as the new master of the elements. Meanwhile, Maskmana gives ArmoBot to BoBoiBoy's father Amato for diagnostics, believing he should help BoBoiBoy.

== Cast ==
- Nur Fathiah Diaz as BoBoiBoy
- Fadhli Mohd Rawi as Retak'ka, the first Elemental Master whose powers were taken back and the main antagonist.
- Wong Pak Lin as Hang Kasa, Retak'ka's mentor and a master of the Crystal Element
- Dzubir Mohammed Zakaria as Gopal
- Nizam Razak as Papa Zola
- Ieesya Isandra as Pipi Zola
- Nur Sarah Alisya Zainal Rashid as Yaya
- Yap Ee Jean as Ying
- Wong Wai Kay as Fang
- Anas Abdul Aziz as Cici Ko, Adu Du, Probe, Tok Aba and Encik Kumar
- Muhammad Abdurrahman Solahuddin as Ochobot
- Hazwani Hamizah Mahayuddin as Ayu Yu
- Nur Iman Andaliz as Tarung

=== English dub ===
- Marsya Danialla Razak as BoBoiBoy
- Azman Zukiply as Retak'ka and Hang Kasa
- Ryan Lee Bhaskaran as Gopal
- Maryam Saesol Md Riyadh as Pipi Zola
- Puteri Sabrina as Yaya
- Denise Chan as Ying
- Wong Wai Kay as Fang
- Anas Abdul Aziz as Cici Ko, Adu Du, Probe, Tok Aba, Papa Zola and Encik Kumar
- Ilhan Mohd Shahrizal as Ochobot
- Hazwani Hamizah Mahayuddin as Ayu Yu
- Kevin Adrian Barnaby as Tarung

== Production ==
The film's director Nizam Razak stated that the process of filmmaking for this second film is faster than the first film and only took a year to be finished. Animonsta enforced a 12-month deadline to see if they could make a film without jeopardising the story or the quality of the animation. He admitted there was pressure in completing the movie on time but his production team of 100 people managed to do so within that time. They used better technology such as Redshift and comprehensive simulation method even though the cost would be higher to give the best quality to the audience. If the reaction to this film is positive, they plan to make movies consistently, with a new film every year or every one-and-a-half years.

== Music ==
"Fire & Water"

Single by Faizal Tahir

from the album Rojak
- Released: 27 June 2019
- Recorded: 2019
- Genre: Pop
- Length: 2:52
- Label: Faithful Music Sdn Bhd
- Songwriters: Faizal Tahir; Mage
- Producers: Animonsta Studios; Astro Shaw

Faizal Tahir singles chronology
"Ratu" (2019)	"Fire & Water" (2019)	"Until We Meet Again" (2019)

The official song for the film, "Fire & Water", is written and performed by Faizal Tahir, after Animonsta Studios approached him. He described the opportunity to sing the theme song as a platform to approach young fans. Its official lyric video was released on 27 June 2019 and the music video was released on 26 July 2019. The iTunes release came on 2 August 2019, alongside all songs in his latest album, Rojak.

== Release ==
Before the release of BoBoiBoy The Movie in 2016, Nizam Razak stated that they already have their ideas for the second film.

Initially, this would be the first Malaysian film to be released simultaneously in Malaysia, Indonesia, Brunei, Singapore, and Vietnam. However, the Vietnamese release was postponed to 30 August in order to allow time to produce a full Vietnamese dub version. For the Indonesian market, it is distributed by CBI Pictures while for the Vietnamese market, the film is distributed by CGV Cinemas and Mani Entertainment.

There were requests to release the film in Thailand and the Philippines, as well as plans to target South Korea, India and China for future releases.

== Comic adaptation ==
This movie has been adapted into a comic titled BoBoiBoy Movie 2: Evolusi Kuasa.

== Reception ==
Days of screening	Cumulative sales in Malaysia
1 day (8 August)	RM1.18 million (US$282,182)
5 days (12 August)	RM9.90 million (US$2.36 million)
8 days (15 August)	RM15.80 million (US$3.77 million)
11 days (18 August)	RM21 million (US$5.02 million)
18 days (25 August)	RM25 million (US$5.97 million)
26 days (2 September)	RM27.70 million (US$6.62 million)
70 days (18 October)	RM29.57 million (US$7.3 million)

Animonsta Studios targets the film to collect more than the first film (RM15.70 million) as the number of cinemas that show this film is higher. The film collected the biggest-grossing local animation film on its first day, raking in RM1.18 million. It achieved its target by overtaking the first movie after eight days, collecting RM15.80 million. In 18 days, the film collected RM25 million within three weeks. It overtook Upin & Ipin: Keris Siamang Tunggal (2019) to become the fourth highest-grossing local film in Malaysia and the highest-grossing animation film in Malaysia, including all local and international animation films, after collecting RM27.70 million for 26 days. However, the title of the highest-grossing animation film in Malaysia was later taken by Ejen Ali: The Movie and Frozen II, which respectively grossed RM 30.8 million and RM 41.67 million.

In 70 days, BoBoiBoy Movie 2 reached RM30 million (US$7.4 million) in Malaysia, and in Brunei, Singapore and Vietnam with RM29.57 million (US$7.3 million), becoming the third highest-grossing local film within Malaysia at that time.

=== Awards and nominations ===
Year	Award	Category	Nominee	Result	Ref(s)
2020	Malaysia Film Festival	Best Animated Film	BoBoiBoy Movie 2	Nominated	
2020	Laurus Film Festival	Best Photo/Poster	BoBoiBoy Movie 2	Won	
2020	Laurus Film Festival	Best Trailer/Teaser	BoBoiBoy Movie 2	Won	
2020	New York Animation Film Awards	Best Animation 3D Film	BoBoiBoy Movie 2	Nominated	
2020	Florence Film Awards	Best Animated Film	BoBoiBoy Movie 2	Nominated	
