= BoBoiBoy =

Malaysian animated series

- Genre: Action; Comedy; Superhero; Adventure
- Created by: Nizam Razak
- Written by: Abdul Razak; Anas Abdul Aziz
- Directed by: Nizam Razak (S1, S3); Yap Ee Jean, Dzubir Mohammed Zakaria (S2–S3)
- Voices of: Nur Fathiah Diaz; Yap Ee Jean; Nur Sarah Alisya Zainal Rashid; Dzubir Mohammed Zakaria; Anas Abdul Aziz; Muhammad Fathi Diaz; Nizam Razak; Yvonne Chong Shin Vun; Wong Wai Kay
- Theme music composer: Yuri Wong, Jonathan Lee
- Opening theme: "BoBoiBoy" (Note: English: "BoBoiBoy, Our Superhero!"); (S1E1–S3E18, S3E20–S3E26); "Jagalah Bumi"; (S3E19)
- Ending theme: "Bersedia" (Note: English: "Hang on Tight"); (S1E1–S3E19); "Jagalah Bumi"; (S3E20–S3E26)
- Country of origin: Malaysia
- Original language: Malay
- No. of seasons: 3
- No. of episodes: 52 (list of episodes)

Production
- Running time: 20 minutes
- Production company: Animonsta Studios

Original release
- Network: TV3
- Release: 13 March 2011 – 11 June 2016

Related
- BoBoiBoy Galaxy; Mechamato

BoBoiBoy is a Malaysian animated television series and franchise produced by Animonsta Studios. The story follows BoBoiBoy, a boy with elemental superpowers who can split into three separate versions of himself. Together with his friends Hanna (Malay: Yaya), Ying, Gopal, and Fang, the team fights to protect the Earth from alien threats, particularly Adu Du and Probe, who aim to conquer the planet.

It consists of three seasons which aired from March 2011 to June 2016. A theatrical film, BoBoiBoy The Movie, was released on 3 March 2016, and a sequel series, BoBoiBoy Galaxy, premiered in November 2016.

== Plot ==
=== Season 1 ===
The series begins with BoBoiBoy traveling to his grandfather Tok Aba's home in Pulau Rintis for the school holidays. At the same time, Adu Du, an alien from the planet Ata Ta Tiga, arrived on Earth to search for energy resources. He discovered cocoa, a powerful energy source that became extinct on his planet about 30,000 years ago. Eager to conquer all the cocoa for himself and become a hero on his planet, Adu Du enlisted the help of the "Power Sphere" named Ochobot. However, a series of mishaps led to BoBoiBoy obtaining Ochobot instead, who then granted BoBoiBoy and his new friends — Ying, Hanna/Yaya, and Gopal — superpowers via special wrist-watch devices known as "Power Bands".

=== Season 2 ===
In this season, BoBoiBoy moves to Pulau Rintis to reunite with Tok Aba Bin Abah Kau, Gopal, Ying and Yaya. The story in this season mainly centres on BoBoiBoy and his friends' lives at Pulau Rintis Primary School. BoBoiBoy also encountered a new challenger, Fang at his new school. In the season 2 finale, BoBoiBoy's friends along with Fang fought a powerful alien named Ejo Jo who planned to steal all their Power Bands.

=== Season 3 ===
In this season, BoBoiBoy defeated Ejo Jo, and Adu Du becomes BoBoiBoy's friend. Their friendship however, did not last throughout the season. Boboiboy also got his new Fire and Water Elemental powers. At the end of season BoBoiBoy and his friends fought Captain Kaizo, however he forfeited the fight and ask BoBoiBoy to join his team to find lost Power Spheres but BoBoiBoy declined the offer.

== Characters ==
- BoBoiBoy (voiced by Nur Fathiah Diaz) is the main protagonist of the series. He originally came to Rintis Island to help Tok Aba at his stall during the holidays. He was granted the Elemental Manipulation Power Watch that allows him to control the elements on the planet. So far he has mastered Earth, Wind and Lightning as well as achieving the second level to each of these elements; Earthquake, Cyclone and Thunderstorm respectively. In Season 2, he moved to Rintis Island and stayed there with Tok Aba as well as going to Rintis Island Primary School. Later in Season 3, BoBoiBoy gained the ability to tap into two new elements, Fire and Water by simply transforming into the two new forms.
- Gopal (voiced by Dzubir Mohammed Zakaria) is BoBoiBoy's best friend and is always supportive to his friends, but he easily gets scared. He gains the Molecular Manipulation Power Watch which allows him to change an object into another by using his imagination, but initially believed to only change objects into food and reverse its order.
- Hanna/Yaya (voiced by Nur Sarah Alisya Zainal Rashid) is BoBoiBoy's neighbour and a well-behaved, intelligent girl. She enjoys baking cookies but her cookies taste horrible that makes anyone who eats them, including animals, passes out, excluding Probe. Anyone who publicly criticizes her cookies would make her angry. She was granted the Gravity Manipulation Power Watch that allows to manipulate gravity within a 25-meter radius, but initially believed to be the ability to fly and have super strength.
  In the official English dub, and in some foreign countries, she is renamed "Hanna", and in some countries she is shown without a hijab. The latter is because some countries had regulations that did not allow veiled characters.
- Ying (voiced by Yap Ee Jean) was initially a shy girl, Ying gains the Time Manipulation Power Watch which allows her to slow down or accelerate time of her surroundings within an area of 25 meter radius, but initially believed as the ability to run at high speeds. After perfecting her powers, she overcame her sneezing problem but her power is now limited to a timer. Soon Ying was able to stop and reverse time as she can arrange everything in time and can rescue anyone from heavy injuries or death.
- Fang (voiced by Wong Wai Kay) He moved to Rintis Island and went to the school on the island in hopes of becoming the most popular student. However, due to Gopal mentioning BoBoiBoy and frequently exaggerating him as being a better person, Fang became jealous of BoBoiBoy and frequently wants to fights him. He becomes friends with BoBoiBoy, Ying, Hanna, and Gopal from season 3 and onward.
- Adu Du (voiced by Anas Abdul Aziz) is an ill-tempered, bossy alien, and BoBoiBoy's nemesis. He was born in the lowest class within the Ata Ta Tiga community and was frequently bullied before being banished from his own planet. He came to Earth after finding out about cocoa power. He attempts to conquer Earth to seize the planet's cocoa but was frequently stopped by BoBoiBoy and his friends. During Ejo Jo's attack, Probe was destroyed and Adu Du lured Ejo Jo into his base to avenge Probe. After successfully driving away Ejo Jo, Adu Du attempts to fix Probe but failed. He ended up trying to behave nicely to find ways to revive Probe which was then successful. When his mother comes and angers with Adu Du behaving nicely, and gets hurt accidentally by BoBoiBoy, he switches side against BoBoiBoy once more.
- Probe (voiced by Anas Abdul Aziz) is Adu Du's robot minion who carries out all of his ground missions. He is actually a prototype version which explains his low intelligence resulting in frequent failures. He is incredibly loyal to Adu Du but often pampered him. He has a myriad of different weapons contained in his limbs. Whenever he gets the chance, Probe loves to discuss with the spaceship Computer on ridiculous topics on Earth. Probe imagines himself a living creature and does things that humans do like humming and sleeping. In Season 2, he was destroyed by Ejo Jo's battle robot to protect Adu Du. He was revived in Season 3 which comes along with a new form called Mega Probe but suffers from temporary memory loss, but was later fixed.
- Ochobot (voiced by Muhammad Fathi Diaz) is the Generation 9 Power Sphere found by Adu Du. Initially mistaking BoBoiBoy as its master, Ochobot grants BoBoiBoy his Elemental Power Watch before his friends and Fang in the second season. Since Tok Aba's cocoa was revealed to be Ochobot's activator, he became a helper at Tok Aba's Kokotiam. In BoBoiBoy: The Movie, Ochobot gains an alternate look & the teleportation power.
- Tok Aba (voiced by Anas Abdul Aziz) is BoBoiBoy's grandfather who owns the Tok Aba's Kokotiam which sells chocolate drinks and food. His cocoa is revealed to be the most powerful cocoa on Earth and he became involved in BoBoiBoy's battle against Adu Du, though at times he proved to be too useful. During Ejo Jo's attack, he temporarily wields the Time Manipulation Power Watch.
- Papa Zola (voiced by Nizam Razak) is a fictional superhero who came to BoBoiBoy's world as a result of BoBoiBoy and Gopal getting out of the Papa Zola game. He helped the Power Band wielders battle against the Sleep Monster. After that, he ended up as a mathematics and physical educations teacher at Rintis Island Primary School. It was revealed that Papa Zola has a wife in a game called Mama Zila, and later has a daughter named Pipi Zola introduced in BoBoiBoy Movie 2 .
- Bago Go (voiced by Nizam Razak) A salesman from Atata Tiga who is part of the "Five Scammer Commanders" organization. As the name of the group suggests, he scams others into buying his products at unreasonably high prices while only buying his customers' products at incredibly low prices. Unlike his brothers, though, Bago Go puts money ahead of his pride as a conman and is reluctant to destroy Adu Du when his brothers tell him to do so.
- Adu Du's Computer (voiced by Yvonne Chong Shin Vun) is Adu Du's computer assembled from several computer models with a female voice. She helps Adu Du in controlling the spaceship. In Season 3, she has more roles and helps set up communications to Bago Go. The computer is shown to have personality despite appearing not as much as it used to.
- Ejo Jo (voiced by Noriman Saffian) is Adu Du's former classmate, as well as Adu Du's loyal bully. He was born into the second class family within the Ata Ta Tiga community and was an elite soldier in the army before he was dismissed due to arrogance. He drove Adu Du away from his own village and exiled him to Atata Tiga. After finding out about Adu Du's operations on Earth, he arrives on Earth to fight against BoBoiBoy and his friends with a desire of taking all of the Earth's powers for himself.
- Multi-Monster (voiced by Anas Abdul Aziz) was originally a single, giant monster created to defeat BoBoiBoy, Multi-Monster has the ability to split into two every time he is defeated but gets smaller in the process. The Multi-Monsters then switch sides and helped BoBoiBoy and his friends escape from Adu Du's spaceship. Later, they set up their own village at the toxic waste where they first fought BoBoiBoy.
- Sleep Monster (voiced by Anas Abdul Aziz) is Papa Zola's nemesis who can put his opponents into sleep with his attacks as well as an expert on checkers. Just like Papa Zola, he came out of the game but battled against BoBoiBoy and his friends and in the end, was put back to sleep permanently by BoBoiBoy after his defeat in his own dream world.
- Ejo Jo's Computer (voiced by Kee Yong Pin) Ejo Jo's computer with a male voice that is more advanced than Adu Du's Computer and can collect more accurate information.
- PETAI (Ejo Jo's Robot) With complete name Perisai Tempur Angkasa-I (Battle Space Robot-I), PETAI is a more advanced version of Probe, because it is the final product of the Battle Robot developed. In its first appearance, it destroyed Probe, then attacked Adu Du and the Power Band wielders. Later, it destroyed BoBoiBoy's school and kidnapped the students of 5 Jujur and Papa Zola but not BoBoiBoy, Fang and Ochobot. In the Season 2 Finale, it was destroyed by Fang's Shadow Dragon and its energy core taken by Adu Du to restore Probe.
- Three Rob An incompetent group of robbers composed of Rob, Robert and Roberto who usually rob items that are deemed useless usually (laundry, goalposts, etc.). Despite this, they manage to escape prison (the first two times, however, were thanks to Adu Du).

== Production ==
BoBoiBoy is the first release of Animonsta Studios Sdn. Bhd., an animation company founded by Nizam Razak with three other partners: Safwan Abdul Karim, Anas Abdul Aziz, and Kee Yong Pin after they left Les' Copaque Production in 2009.

The original concept of the story centres on a coffee-addict alien named Adu Du who has made his way to Earth. A minor change was made later, where instead of coffee, the alien is now in search of cocoa. The change, according to its Facebook fan page, was due to the fact that coffee is a bitter-tasting drink, and does not appeal to children.

The series was released simultaneously in two languages: Malay and English, for the local and international market respectively. Both versions fully utilise different voice actors. In the Malay version, Nur Fathiah Diaz, was chosen to voice the main character, BoBoiBoy. The series ended after three seasons and was taken up by its sequel, BoBoiBoy Galaxy, starting on 25 November 2016.

== Media ==
=== Animated series ===
The first season consists of 13 episodes and two extended episodes. It started airing on Sunday, 13 March 2011 on TV3. It was shown on Disney Channel Asia starting 11 June 2011. Every episode is 22-minutes long and consists of part 1 and 2, each last for 11 minutes. Due to the cartoon's popularity, Animonsta Studios agreed to re-air the final episode with an "Extended Finale" on 1 January 2012.

The second season consists of 13 episodes, it was aired on Sunday, 27 May 2012 on TV3.

The third season consists of 23 episodes, originally airing from January 2014 to June 2016. This is the first season that uploaded new episodes onto YouTube before airing on TV. It is also the first season to change the theme song, switching out "BoBoiBoy Superhero Kita" (transl. BoBoiBoy, Our Superhero!) with "Jagalah Bumi" by Kotak.

=== Movie ===
The first film of the series BoBoiBoy: The Movie was released on 3 March 2016 in Malaysia, 18 March 2016 in Singapore and 13 April 2016 in Indonesia. Taking place after the events of season 3, the movie brings BoBoiBoy and his friends on an adventure to a mysterious island that houses an ancient Power Sphere older than Ochobot with untold powers. Ochobot has been taken by a new group of enemies called the Tengkotak, led by Bora Ra who attempts to seek out an ancient Power Sphere called Klamkabot. With a budget of RM5 million, it received positive reviews and is a box office success, grossing around RM20 million.

=== Comics ===
Issues	Official title
1	BoBoiBoy: Pertarungan Terakhir
Comic adaptation of last three episodes of season 3.
2	BoBoiBoy: Sfera Kuasa
Comic adaptation of BoBoiBoy: The Movie.

== Awards ==
Anugerah Karyawan Animasi

== International broadcasts ==
Country	Channel	Airdates
Indonesia	RTV	16 December 2020
Indonesia	MNCTV	20 October 2014
Indonesia	Global TV	1 July 2012
Thailand	MONO29 Cartoon Club	19 August 2018
India	Hungama TV	12 June 2017
India	Marvel HQ	5 June 2019
Vietnam	Pops Kids (YouTube channel)	March 2018
China	Tencent Video	December 2017

== Reception ==
=== In public discussion ===
In Vietnam, BoBoiBoy is often mentioned by Vietnamese animators, animation studio creators, animation industry associations and Vietnamese media alongside with other Malaysian animation IPs: Upin & Ipin, Ejen Ali and Mechamato as the prime examples for the rapid development of Malaysian animation industry during public discussion about the solution for the growth of Vietnam's national animation industry (vi).
