= List of animated television series by episode count =

This is a list of animated television series by episode count. This article does not include anime series which originate from Japan (for this see the list of anime series by episode count). Single series with at least 100 episodes and television franchises with at least 40 episodes are listed.

== Single series ==
Show is still in production

Title	Country of origin	Seasons	Episodes
Sandmännchen	East Germany (1959–1990), Germany (1990–present)	61	22,200
Pleasant Goat and Big Big Wolf	China	45	3,207
3000 Whys of Blue Cat	China	9	3,057
TV Donghwa Haengbokhan Sesang	South Korea	N/A	2,809
Die Sendung mit der Maus	Germany	N/A	2,122
GG Bond	China	18	1,812
Boonie Bears	China	24	1,352
Gopal Bhar	India	1	1,321
Motu Patlu	India	16	1,284
Nut Boltu	India	11	1,032
Happy Heroes	China	20	924
New Big Head Son and Little Head Father	China	13	919
The Simpsons	United States	38	811
Upin & Ipin	Malaysia	20	759
Pakdam Pakdai	India	14	735
Chhota Bheem	India	16	663
Magic Eye is Back	China	6	624
Thomas & Friends	United Kingdom	24	584
Luntik	Russia	10	572
Little Master	China	16	520
The Magic Roundabout	France	5	516
A.U	China	12	500
SkyEye	China	1	500
Family Guy	United States	25	462
Peppa Pig	United Kingdom	9	459
Teen Titans Go!	United States	9	456
Crusader Rabbit	United States	3	455
Howie & Landau	China	6	449
GoGo Bus	China	17	442
Super Wings	South Korea, China, United States	10	424
Kikoriki	Russia	5	408
American Dad!	United States	22	401
Seer	China	12	392
Counting with Paula	Singapore	7	384
SpongeBob SquarePants	United States	17	344
South Park	United States	29	343
Red vs. Blue	United States	18	338
Kral Şakir	Turkey	9	333
Larva	South Korea	6	332
Pocoyo	Spain, United Kingdom	6	331
My Magic Pet Morphle	Netherlands, United States, United Kingdom	2	324
Molang	France, South Korea	6	321
Nix - Je Sob Pare	India	4	320
Fireman Sam	United Kingdom	16	317
Paw Patrol	Canada	14	316
Beavis and Butt-Head	United States	12	314
The Loud House	United States	10	315
Bob's Burgers	United States	16	313
Pororo the Little Penguin	South Korea	9	312
Kid-E-Cats	Russia	6	312
The Dr. Binocs Show	India	6	305
Hoodies Squad	Poland	14	303
Mutt and Jeff	United States	N/A	292
The Fixies	Russia	6	289
Om Nom Stories	Russia, United Kingdom	29	285
Adventure Time	United States	10	283
The Amazing World of Gumball	United Kingdom, United States, Ireland, Germany	8	280
King of the Hill	United States	15	279
Regular Show	United States	8	261
Loopdidoo	France	5	260
The Smurfs (1981–1989)	United States, Belgium	9	258
Sunny Bunnies	Belarus	10	254
Arthur	United States, Canada	25	253
Horrid Henry	United Kingdom	5	250
Bob the Builder (1999–2011)	United Kingdom	18	250
Be-Be-Bears	Russia	10	249
Jing-Ju Cats	China	4	234
Krazy Kat	United States	N/A	232
Monica and Friends	Brazil	23	230
The Gumby Show	United States	3	229
My Little Pony: Friendship Is Magic	United States, Canada	9	221
Popeye the Sailor	United States	N/A	220
Robot Chicken	United States	11	220
Hey Duggee	United Kingdom	5	216
Ninjago	Denmark, Canada	15	210
Tayo the Little Bus	South Korea	8	208
Where's Chicky?	France	4	208
King Leonardo and His Short Subjects	United States	N/A	208
Earth to Luna!	Brazil	8	208
Winx Club	Italy	8	208
Mini Beat Power Rockers	Argentina	4	200
Woody Woodpecker	United States	N/A	200
Curious George	United States	15	198
Postman Pat	United Kingdom	8	196
Teenage Mutant Ninja Turtles (1987–1996)	United States	10	193
Oswald the Lucky Rabbit	United States	N/A	190
Shaun the Sheep	United Kingdom	7	190
Felix the Cat	United States	N/A	184
Catch! Teenieping	South Korea	7	182
Mr. Bean: The Animated Series	United Kingdom	4	182
Oggy and the Cockroaches	France	8	182
Totally Spies!	France, Canada	7	182
Masyanya	Russia, Israel	9	181
Pada Zaman Dahulu	Malaysia	6	180
Blaze and the Monster Machines	United States, Canada	9	180
Craig of the Creek	United States	6	180
Futurama	United States	11	180
Fudêncio and his friends	Brazil	6	179
Ben 10 (2016–2021)	United States	4	178
Wild Kratts	Canada	7	177
Dora the Explorer	United States	8	177
Chuggington	United States	7	176
Bolek and Lolek	Poland	11	174
Rugrats	United States	9	172
The Fairly OddParents	United States	10	172
Masha and the Bear	Russia	7	169
The Flintstones	United States	6	166
Tele-Comics/NBC Comics	United States	N/A	165
Tom and Jerry	United States	N/A	164
The Rocky and Bullwinkle Show	United States	5	163
Miraculous: Tales of Ladybug & Cat Noir	France	7	161
Thomas & Friends: All Engines Go	United States, Canada	4	161
Steven Universe	United States	5	160
DC Nation Shorts	United States	1	159
Phineas and Ferb	United States	6	158
Big Head Son and Little Head Father	China	2	156
Bananas in Pyjamas	Australia	3	156
Bozo: The World's Most Famous Clown	United States	1	156
Laurel and Hardy	United States	1	156
New Looney Tunes	United States	3	156
Pingu	Switzerland, United Kingdom	6	156
Roger Ramjet	United States	5	156
Simon	France	3	156
The New 3 Stooges	United States	N/A	156
The Ruff and Reddy Show	United States	3	156
The Smurfs (2021–present)	Belgium, France, Germany	3	156
Polly Pocket (2018–present)	Canada, United States	6	155
Teenage Mutant Ninja Turtles (2003–2009)	United States	7	155
The Jungle Book	India, Germany, France	3	155
Bluey	Australia	3	154
Go Jetters	United Kingdom, Ireland	3	154
Cyberchase	United States	16	153
Uncle Grandpa	United States	5	153
Total DramaRama	Canada, United States	3	152
PJ Masks	France, United Kingdom, Canada	6	151
Waybuloo	United Kingdom, Canada, United States	3	150
The Penguins of Madagascar	United States	3	149
Talking Tom & Friends	United States, Austria, Slovenia, Spain	5	148
Lamput	India	4	147
Cartoon Planet	United States	3	146
Archer	United States	14	145
Total Drama	Canada	6	145
Aqua Teen Hunger Force	United States	12	144
Blue's Clues	United States	6	141
The Real Ghostbusters	United States	7	140
We Bare Bears	United States	4	140
Doc McStuffins	United States, Ireland	5	136
El Chavo Animado	Mexico	7	134
Happy Tree Friends	United States	5	133
Star Wars: The Clone Wars (2008–20)	United States	7	133
Squidbillies	United States	13	132
Johnny Cypher in Dimension Zero	United States, Japan	N/A	131
Alvinnn!!! and the Chipmunks	United States, France	5	130
Bob the Builder (2015–2018)	United Kingdom, Canada	3	130
Clarence	United States	3	130
Courageous Cat and Minute Mouse	United States	N/A	130
He-Man and the Masters of the Universe	United States	2	130
Max & Ruby	Canada	7	130
The Dick Tracy Show	United States	1	130
The New Adventures of Pinocchio	United States, Canada, Japan	1	130
The Plastic Man Comedy/Adventure Show	United States	N/A	130
ThunderCats (1985–1989)	United States, Japan	4	130
WordGirl	United States	8	130
Talking Tom Shorts	United States	3	129
Bubble Guppies	United States, Canada	6	129
Les Kassos	France	8	129
Mickey Mouse Clubhouse	United States	4	125
The Haunted House	South Korea	5	123
Garfield and Friends	United States	7	121
Robocar Poli	South Korea	5	120
Minnie's Bow-Toons	United States	9	120
Omar & Hana	Malaysia	5	117
Johnny Test (2005–2014)	United States, Canada	6	117
Kevin Spencer	Canada	8	113
Spidey and His Amazing Friends	United States, Canada	5	113
Masameer	Saudi Arabia	8	107
Ultimate Spider-Man	United States	4	104
Brainy Bubbly Bug Buddies	China	1	104
Grizzy & the Lemmings	France	4	104
Hungarian Folk Tales	Hungary	9	100
Hey Arnold!	United States	5	100
The Olympic Adventures of Fuwa	China	1	100
Out of the Inkwell	United States	N/A	100

== Longest-running animated television franchises ==
At least one show is still airing new episodes

Country of origin	Title	Seasons	Episodes
United States	Looney Tunes	30	1,626
Japan, United States	Transformers	29	1,274
United States	Mickey Mouse & Friends	29	1,137
United States	The Simpsons	38	834
Malaysia	Upin & Ipin	24	809
United States	Yogi Bear & Friends	28	761
United Kingdom	Thomas & Friends	28	746
United Kingdom	Peppa Pig	14	719
United States	Popeye	25	638
France, United Kingdom	The Magic Roundabout	3	545
Finland	Angry Birds	28	612
United States	Teenage Mutant Ninja Turtles	23	492
United States	The Flintstones	22	481
United States	SpongeBob SquarePants	24	446
United States	Scooby-Doo	29	428
United States	Family Guy	23	425
United States	Teen Titans	14	512
United States	Tom and Jerry	16	418
United States	Ben 10	22	408
United States	Spider-Man	24	406
United Kingdom	Bob the Builder	21	380
Belgium, United States	The Smurfs	12	371
United States	Felix the Cat	5	357
United States	Masters of the Universe	10	354
United States, Canada	My Little Pony	14	352
United States	Batman	22	352
United States	American Dad!	18	351
United States	South Park	26	325
Japan	Sonic the Hedgehog	9	313
United States, Canada	Arthur	29	253
United States	Dora the Explorer	19	302
Canada	Paw Patrol	12	300
United Kingdom	Wallace & Gromit	13	297
Japan	Hello Kitty	23	294
United States	Beavis and Butt-Head	13	292
Canada	Total Drama	9	290
United States	Adventure Time	11	287
United States	The Loud House	9	284
United Kingdom, United States	The Amazing World of Gumball	7	280
United States	Madagascar	17	277
United States	Star Wars	16	267
Canada, France, United States	Inspector Gadget	11	264
United States	Garfield	13	263
United States	Woody Woodpecker	4	263
United States	The Gumby Show	4	261
Italy, United States	Winx Club	11	260
Finland	Moomin	11	258
United States	Rugrats	16	255
United Kingdom	Danger Mouse	16	253
United States	DC Animated Universe	15	252
United States	The Powerpuff Girls	9	252
United Kingdom	Mr. Men	8	249
United Kingdom	Postman Pat	10	248
United States	Avengers	9	242
United States	Rocky and Bullwinkle	9	241
United Kingdom	Dennis the Menace and Gnasher	7	240
United States	The Pink Panther	4	236
United States	G.I. Joe	10	228
United States	Clifford the Big Red Dog	5	221
United States	Alvin and the Chipmunks	15	253
United States	Phineas and Ferb	9	247
France, Canada	Totally Spies!	9	221
Denmark, Canada	Ninjago	15	213
Singapore	Oddbods	4	208
United States	Superman	13	208
United States	ThunderCats	6	208
Switzerland, United Kingdom	Pingu	8	208
United States	Peanuts	7	207
United States	The Fairly OddParents	12	205
United States	Animaniacs	12	204
France, Japan, Netherlands	Barbapapa	4	202
United Kingdom	Paddington Bear	8	198
United States	Casper the Friendly Ghost	8	198
United Kingdom	Numberblocks	8	188
France	Grizzy & the Lemmings	5	182
United States	Ghostbusters	8	180
United States	Steven Universe	6	180
United States	Muppet Babies (1984)/Muppet Babies (2018)	11 (8+3)	178 (107+71)
United States	The Lion King	6	159
United States, Canada	Johnny Test	8	157
United States	Littlest Pet Shop	5	156
Malaysia	BoBoiBoy	9	150
United States	Sabrina the Teenage Witch	4	148
Canada	Caillou	5	144
United States	How to Train Your Dragon	10	144
France	The Adventures of Tintin	10	141
United States	Cow and Chicken	8	141
United Kingdom	The Clangers	5	130
United States	Wacky Races	5	129
United States	Rick and Morty	12	126
United States	Busytown	7	117
United States	Kung Fu Panda	5	117
United States	Avatar: The Last Airbender	8	116
United States	Winnie the Pooh	7	113
United Kingdom	The Wombles	5	112
United States	Heathcliff	4	112
Canada	Franklin the Turtle	8	104
Brazil, Canada	Fishtronaut	2	104
United States	Super Friends	9	93
Japan	Mario	3	91

== See also ==
- List of television programs by episode count
- List of anime series by episode count
- List of anime franchises by episode count
- List of animated television series
