= Omar & Hana =

Malaysian animated series

- Genre: Animation; Preschool
- Created by: Sinan Ismail; Hairulfaizalizwan Ahmad Sofian
- Written by: Adlina Adam; Syafiq Nasir; Shafiah Shafiee; Nurul Ain Jamaluddin
- Directed by: Nabil Baharum
- Creative director: Zainul Wahab
- Voices of: Syaima' Soleha Aizul Nawi; Nur Safiah Mohamead Hafiez Shah; Nur Qaisara Mohd Effendy; Nurhawa Abdul Mutalib; Ajwad Amaluddin; Nur Fatihah Ramani; Hafzan Hazlim; CT Nor; Alya Amany; Nabil Baharum; Syahril Khalid; Fadilah A. Rahman
- Theme music composer: Akhadiat Denny; Syafiq Nasir; Abi Hurairoh
- Opening theme: "Omar & Hana"
- Ending theme: "Omar & Hana"
- Country of origin: Malaysia
- Original language: Malay (original)
- No. of seasons: 5
- No. of episodes: 117

Production
- Executive producer: Sinan Ismail
- Producer: Fadilah A. Rahman
- Production location: Malaysia
- Cinematography: Rasyiqah Fauzi
- Editor: Khuzaini Yahaya
- Running time: 2–5 minutes (songs); 6–10 minutes (stories)
- Production company: Digital Durian

Original release
- Network: Astro Ceria
- Release: 26 May 2017 – 14 May 2021

Omar & Hana is a Malaysian Islamic preschool edutainment children’s animated television series aimed at two to six years olds. Created by Sinan Ismail and Hairulfaizalizwan Ahmad Sofian, it is produced by Cyberjaya-based Malaysian animation studio, Digital Durian.

Omar & Hana originally told the journey of two young siblings, Omar and Hana, their family and friends, as they learn about the values of Islam. It also contains contents about the characteristics of Islam and good moral values. Each episode (except episodes from Kisah Omar & Hana) contains except from Hadith and surahs from the Quran at the end of the songs performed.

The series has five seasons and 117 episodes in total. It was first shown in May 2017 until May 2021 on Astro Ceria. Its official YouTube channel also garnered 5 million followers and watched nearly 3 billion times. [6b] It has been produced in Malay for Malaysian release and in English, Indonesian, Chinese, Arabic and Urdu language for international release. The series also spawned merchandising and licensing deals. An official app of the series was launched in July 2020.

== Episodes ==
Season	Episodes	Originally released	
Season	Episodes	First released	Last released
1	26	May 26, 2018	September 26, 2018
2	13	August 24, 2018	January 18, 2019
3	40	April 12, 2019	April 11, 2020
4	25	April 17, 2020	November 6, 2020
5	13	April 16, 2021	May 14, 2021

== Awards and nominations ==
Year	Award	Category	Recipient/Nominated work(s)	Result	Ref.
2020	24th Asian Television Awards	Best Preschool Program	Omar & Hana	Nominated	
2021	34th Bintang Popular Berita Harian Awards	Popular Animation Characters	Omar & Hana	Nominated	
