= List of Paw Patrol episodes =

Paw Patrol is a Canadian 3D-animated television series created by Keith Chapman. It is produced by Spin Master Entertainment, with animation provided by Guru Studio. In Canada, the series is primarily broadcast on TVOntario, which first ran previews of the show in August 2013. The series premiered on Nickelodeon in the United States on August 12, 2013.

== Series overview ==
Season	Segments	Episodes	Originally released	
Season	Segments	Episodes	First released	Last released
1	48	26	August 12, 2013	August 18, 2014
2	48	26	August 13, 2014	December 4, 2015
3	48	26	November 20, 2015	January 26, 2017
4	47	26	February 6, 2017	March 8, 2018
5	47	26	February 6, 2018	January 25, 2019
6	49	26	February 22, 2019	July 23, 2021
7	45	26	March 27, 2020	May 7, 2021
8	53	26	April 2, 2021	April 21, 2023
9	46	26	March 25, 2022	July 31, 2023
10	47	26	July 10, 2023	September 17, 2024
11	46	26	September 18, 2024	August 15, 2025
12	24	13	July 18, 2025	March 5, 2026
13	24	13	March 9, 2026	TBA
14	TBA	13	July 31, 2026	TBA

== Episodes ==
=== Season 1 (2013–14) ===
No. overall	No. in season	Title	Written by	U.S. air date	Canadian air date	Prod. code	U.S. viewers (millions)
1	1	"Pups Make a Splash"	Scott Kraft	November 14, 2013	August 27, 2013	101	1.74
1	1	"Pups Fall Festival"	Kim Duran	November 14, 2013	August 27, 2013	101	1.74
The Flounder owned by Cap'n Turbot gets stuck in rocks and begins leaking, so Zuma, Rocky and Skye are called in to pull it out before it sinks. An early snowfall is coming, so the PAW Patrol helps Farmer Yumi harvest her crops.
2	2	"Pups Save the Sea Turtles"	Ursula Ziegler-Sullivan	August 20, 2013	August 27, 2013	102	2.11
2	2	"Pups and the Very Big Baby"	Ursula Ziegler-Sullivan	August 20, 2013	August 27, 2013	102	2.11
The Paw Patrol pups are playing at the beach when they discover baby turtles. Ryder and pups must make them a safe route to the bay. A baby whale has beached herself. The PAW Patrol has to rescue her and make sure her mother doesn't get too close.
3	3	"Pups and the Kitty-tastrophe"	Ursula Ziegler-Sullivan	August 12, 2013	August 30, 2013	103	2.02
3	3	"Pups Save a Train"	Franklin Young	August 12, 2013	August 30, 2013	103	2.02
Ryder and the PAW Patrol save a missing kitty from the bay, but she causes some mayhem on land. Ryder, Rubble, and Rocky call in Chase to help them free Katie and Cali's train from a rockslide.
4	4	"Pup Pup Boogie"	Ursula Ziegler-Sullivan	August 19, 2013	September 5, 2013	104	2.16
4	4	"Pups in a Fog"	Carolyn Hay	August 19, 2013	September 5, 2013	104	2.16
The PAW Patrol must work quickly to fix the tracks and remove a train car with the new Pup Pup Boogie 2 at the train station, before the next train comes. The pups have to replace the light in the lighthouse.
5	5	"Pup Pup Goose"	Ursula Ziegler-Sullivan	August 22, 2013	September 6, 2013	105	2.01
5	5	"Pup Pup and Away"	Kim Duran	August 22, 2013	September 6, 2013	105	2.01
Marshall befriends the gosling of a flock of geese he named Fuzzy. But when Fuzzy wanders into the city, Marshall, Ryder, Chase, and Skye are called to help Fuzzy get back to his flock before the flock migrates south without him. Mayor Goodway’s hot air balloon must be fixed before she can participate in the Hot Air Balloon race, which includes the losing-hating mayor of Foggy Bottom Humdinger.
6	6	"Pups on Ice"	Franklin Young	January 8, 2014	September 9, 2013	106	2.05
6	6	"Pups and the Snow Monster"	Ursula Ziegler-Sullivan	January 8, 2014	September 9, 2013	106	2.05
Ryder and the PAW Patrol need to rescue Alex on Jake’s mountain. The pups find strange footprints in the snow on the mountain outside Adventure Bay. Everyone thinks it's a "snow monster", and it's scaring the skiers away.
7	7	"Pups Save the Circus"	Carolyn Hay	August 21, 2013	September 10, 2013	107	1.95
7	7	"Pup a Doodle Do"	Ursula Ziegler-Sullivan	August 21, 2013	September 10, 2013	107	1.95
2 baby elephants escape from the circus train. It's up to the Paw Patrol to bring them back. Mayor Goodway's purse chicken has gone missing.
8	8	"Pups Pit Crew"	Franklin Young	August 26, 2013	September 11, 2013	108	1.68
8	8	"Pups Fight Fire"	Kim Duran	August 26, 2013	September 11, 2013	108	1.68
Alex builds his own super trike out of old restaurant materials when the trike falls apart on him. The Paw Patrol must help Alex repair his super trike and train him to ride his trike safely. Marshall proves that he is a true hero when he stops to put out a real fire during a race against the clock for a trophy.
9	9	"Pups Save the Treats"	Ursula Ziegler-Sullivan	September 30, 2013	September 12, 2013	109	1.31
9	9	"Pups Get a Lift"	Kim Duran	September 30, 2013	September 12, 2013	109	1.31
Mr. Porter's van full of puppy food slides on the ice near the shore; Ryder and the PAW Patrol must save the day. Katie and her cat Cali are on the chair lift when it stops, leaving them above the ski hill with no way to get down.
10	10	"Pups and the Ghost Pirate"	Ursula Ziegler-Sullivan	October 23, 2013	September 13, 2013	110	2.08
The Paw Patrol takes a break from Trick or Treating when Katie, Mayor Goodway, Alex, Mr. Porter, and Captain Turbot need help when they get stuck on a runaway ship during a halloween party that mysteriously sailed off. Unfortunately for Captain Turbot, he lost his glasses and can’t see where to steer so its up to the team to discover how the ship began moving and all the other haunted events, which turned out to be Mayor Goodway’s purse chicken Chickaletta as the secret captain, Wally the Walrus making the loud snoring sounds that echoes behind the barrels and who ate Mr. Porter’s cookies, and Katie’s cat Cali who raised the ship’s sails.
11	11	"Pups Save Christmas"	Ursula Ziegler-Sullivan	December 12, 2013	December 24, 2013	111	2.60
On Christmas Eve, Santa Claus' sleigh has accidentally crashed. He enlists Ryder and the PAW Patrol to help save Christmas by fixing his sleigh, locating its power source, and rounding up his reindeer.
12	12	"Pups Get a Rubble"	Carolyn Hay	September 18, 2013	September 17, 2013	112	1.55
12	12	"Pups Save a Walrus"	Scott Albert	September 18, 2013	September 17, 2013	112	1.55
Ryder tells Mayor Goodway about Rubble's story of where he was found and how he joined the PAW Patrol when Jake gets trapped in a rockslide. Wally the Walrus gets tangled in an old fishing net, Ryder and the Paw Patrol need to get him to the surface and back to shore safely.
13	13	"Pups Save the Bunnies"	Ursula Ziegler-Sullivan	August 28, 2013	September 18, 2013	113	2.06
13	13	"Pup-Tacular"	Kim Duran	August 28, 2013	September 18, 2013	113	2.06
A bunch of bunnies come to Farmer Yumi's carrot patch. The PAW Patrol must catch them all and relocate them to a new home. Marshall & Rubble are at Katie's Pet Parlor. Rubble is taking a bubble bath because Katie is entering him in the Pup-Tacular, A puppy show where the best styled pup wins a trophy and a bone.
14	14	"Pups Save the Bay"	Ursula Ziegler-Sullivan	September 16, 2013	October 21, 2013	114	1.36
14	14	"Pups Save a Goodway"	Simon Nicholson	September 16, 2013	October 21, 2013	114	1.36
Ryder and the Paw Patrol clean up a small oil spill in the water near Adventure Bay. When Adventure Bay's famous statue ends up at the bottom of the Bay, Ryder and the PAW Patrol have to help Mayor Goodway bring the statue back.
15	15	"Pups Save a Hoedown"	Sheila Dinsmore	October 2, 2013	October 28, 2013	115	1.77
15	15	"Pups Save Alex"	Scott Albert	October 2, 2013	October 28, 2013	115	1.77
The Paw Patrol are having a good time at the Adventure Bay Hoedown, but trouble starts to brew when Farmer Al's cows get spooked out and are on the loose in Adventure Bay. The PAW Patrol must help Cali before she falls, and only Alex has a solution.
16	16	"Pups Save a School Day"	Ursula Ziegler-Sullivan	November 12, 2013	October 29, 2013	116	1.54
16	16	"Pups Turn on the Lights"	Scott Albert	November 12, 2013	October 29, 2013	116	1.54
Ryder and the PAW Patrol must find Alex's backpack before the school bus comes. While planning a surprise birthday party for Chase, the power goes out due to a windstorm that breaks the blade on one of the windmills. It’s up to the pups to fix the windmill to restore the power and save Chase’s party.
17	17	"Pups Save a Pool Day"	John Van Bruggen	November 13, 2013	October 30, 2013	117	1.89
17	17	"Circus Pup Formers"	Kim Duran	November 13, 2013	October 30, 2013	117	1.89
On a hot day, the pups and their friends want to swim in the nearby pool, only to find it empty. Ryder, Marshall, Rubble, Rocky, and Chase race to the water tower to investigate why there is no water in the pool, which they discover is because the level of the tower became unstable and one of the tower’s water pipes got bent. The Paw Patrol has to fix the water tower and get the pool full of water again. Raymundo’s circus show is at risk of being cancelled when the performers and most of the animals fail to show up due to being stuck on a broken train. The Paw Patrol have to help set up the circus tent and fill in for the performers and put on their own circus pup extravaganza.
18	18	"Pups Save the Easter Egg Hunt"	Ursula Ziegler-Sullivan	April 14, 2014	April 19, 2014	118	2.12
19	19	"Pups Save a Super Pup"	Kim Duran	January 10, 2014	August 2, 2014	119	1.81
19	19	"Pups Save Ryder's Robot"	Scott Albert	January 10, 2014	August 2, 2014	119	1.81
20	20	"Pups Go All Monkey"	Scott Albert	March 5, 2014	February 8, 2014	120	2.05
20	20	"Pups Save a Hoot"	Simon Nicholson	March 5, 2014	February 8, 2014	120	2.05
21	21	"Pups Save a Bat"	Kim Duran	March 7, 2014	February 15, 2014	121	2.17
21	21	"Pups Save a Toof"	Ursula Ziegler-Sullivan	March 7, 2014	February 15, 2014	121	2.17
22	22	"Pups Save the Camping Trip"	Ursula Ziegler-Sullivan	May 22, 2014	February 22, 2014	122	N/A
22	22	"Pups and the Trouble with Turtles"	Franklin Young	May 22, 2014	February 22, 2014	122	N/A
Skye and Rocky go on their first camping trip ever - but when Chickaletta gets caught in a crevice, they have to call in the PAW Patrol. The pups work together to rescue Chickaletta while still having fun learning about camping.
23	23	"Pups and the Beanstalk"	Kim Duran	May 20, 2014	March 1, 2014	123	1.75
23	23	"Pups Save the Turbots"	Ursula Ziegler-Sullivan	May 20, 2014	March 1, 2014	123	1.75
24	24	"Pups and the Lighthouse Boogie"	Ursula Ziegler-Sullivan	May 6, 2014	March 8, 2014	124	1.57
24	24	"Pups Save Ryder"	Scott Albert	May 6, 2014	March 8, 2014	124	1.57
25	25	"Pups Great Race"	Kim Duran	May 8, 2014	March 15, 2014	125	1.75
25	25	"Pups Take the Cake"	Kim Duran	May 8, 2014	March 15, 2014	125	1.75
The Paw Patrol have a race around Adventure Bay, though it takes a turn when Alex wants to join in the race. Mr. Porter burns a cake he bakes for a contest, and he needs the Paw Patrol’s help to bake a new cake in time for the cake contest.
26	26	"Pups and the Pirate Treasure"	Ursula Ziegler-Sullivan	August 18, 2014	March 22, 2014	126	N/A

=== Season 2 (2014–15) ===
No. overall	No. in season	Title	Written by	U.S. air date	Canadian air date	Prod. code	U.S. viewers (millions)
27a	1a	"Pups Save the Penguins"	Ursula Ziegler-Sullivan	August 22, 2014	August 27, 2014	201a	N/A
27b	1b	"Pups Save a Dolphin Pup"	Kim Duran	August 22, 2014	August 27, 2014	201b	N/A
28a	2a	"Pups Save the Space Alien"	Ursula Ziegler-Sullivan	August 13, 2014	August 29, 2014	202a	2.04
28b	2b	"Pups Save a Flying Frog"	Kim Duran	August 13, 2014	August 29, 2014	202b	2.04
29a	3a	"Pups Save Jake"	Kacey Arnold	September 16, 2014	August 27, 2014	203a	N/A
While Marshall and Rubble watch the latest episode of Apollo the Super-Pup, Chase enlists the PAW Patrol to rescue Jake when his ankle gets stuck between some fallen rocks.
29b	3b	"Pups Save the Parade"	Amy Keating Rogers	September 16, 2014	August 27, 2014	203b	N/A
30a	4a	"Pups Save the Diving Bell"	Ursula Ziegler-Sullivan	September 17, 2014	October 4, 2014	204a	1.45
Cap'n Turbot and Francois get stuck at the bottom of the ocean in their new diving bell. Zuma uses his new submarine and Rocky uses his scuba gear to get the Turbots free.
30b	4b	"Pups Save the Beavers"	Scott Albert	September 17, 2014	October 4, 2014	204b	1.45
When a rainstorm washes away the dam in Chompy the Beaver’s pond, Chompy causes trouble when he starts chewing away at Farmer Yumi’s barn, so the pups must help Chompy rebuild his dam, and later stop other beavers causing trouble in Adventure Bay.
31a	5a	"Pups Save a Ghost"	Ursula Ziegler-Sullivan	October 20, 2014	November 22, 2014	205a	1.43
Something is haunting the lookout at night and the pups have to investigate what it is. With the help of Chase and his new super spy gear, they find out the “ghost” haunting the lookout was just Marshall who was sleepwalking.
31b	5b	"Pups Save a Show"	Kim Duran	October 20, 2014	November 22, 2014	205b	1.43
32	6	"The New Pup"	Ursula Ziegler-Sullivan	November 14, 2014	October 18, 2014	206	1.63
The PAW Patrol heads to the antarctic to rescue Jake. He gets aid from a local dog named Everest who helps him survive the wintry conditions until the PAW Patrol arrives.
33a	7a	"Pups Jungle Trouble"	Kacey Arnold	November 18, 2014	November 15, 2014	207a	1.24
33b	7b	"Pups Save a Herd"	Kim Duran	November 18, 2014	November 15, 2014	207b	1.24
34a	8a	"Pups and the Big Freeze"	Franklin Young	November 20, 2014	February 11, 2015	208a	N/A
34b	8b	"Pups Save a Basketball Game"	Kim Duran	November 20, 2014	February 11, 2015	208b	N/A
35a	9a	"Pups Save an Ace"	Kim Duran	October 22, 2014	November 8, 2014	209a	1.24
While on her way to Adventure Bay, a famous airplane stunt pilot named Ace Sorenson runs into trouble when her airplane breaks down. The Paw Patrol need to help Ace safely land in Adventure Bay and fix her plane for her upcoming wing-walking show.
35b	9b	"Pups Save a Wedding"	Ursula Ziegler-Sullivan	October 22, 2014	November 8, 2014	209b	1.24
36a	10a	"Pups Save a Talent Show"	Ursula Ziegler-Sullivan	January 6, 2015	February 13, 2015	210a	N/A
36b	10b	"Pups Save the Corn Roast"	Amy Keating Rogers	January 6, 2015	February 13, 2015	210b	N/A
37a	11a	"Pups Leave Marshall Home Alone"	Ursula Ziegler-Sullivan	January 8, 2015	February 7, 2015	211a	1.87
Marshall stays at the lookout by himself while Ryder and the other pups are away at parachute training. When a group of kittens runs off from Katie’s pet parlor, Marshall must help Katie round up the lost kittens.
37b	11b	"Pups Save the Deer"	Amy Keating Rogers	January 8, 2015	February 7, 2015	211b	1.87
38a	12a	"Pups Save the Parrot"	Scott Albert	March 2, 2015	February 14, 2015	212a	1.54
38b	12b	"Pups Save the Queen Bee"	Ursula Ziegler-Sullivan	March 2, 2015	February 14, 2015	212b	1.54
39	13	"Pups Save a Mer-Pup"	Amy Keating Rogers	March 20, 2015	February 18, 2015	213	1.90
While camping on the beach, Cap'n Turbot tells the PAW Patrol about a mystical sea creature known as a mer-pup, a half-pup half-fish creature that can temporarily turn pups into mer-pups. When a baby mer-pup needs help from the sunken old ship, Skye and Zuma enlist Ryder, Cap'n Turbot, and the PAW Patrol to help a mer-mom and her baby on an underwater rescue.
40a	14a	"Pups Save an Elephant Family"	Elizabeth Keyishian	March 6, 2015	February 19, 2015	214a	1.69
40b	14b	"Pups and the Mischievous Kittens"	Ursula Ziegler-Sullivan	March 6, 2015	February 19, 2015	214b	1.69
41a	15a	"Pups Save a Friend"	Kim Duran	February 13, 2015	March 7, 2015	215a	1.38
41b	15b	"Pups Save a Stowaway"	Scott Albert	February 13, 2015	March 7, 2015	215b	1.38
42a	16a	"Pups' Adventures in Babysitting"	Ursula Ziegler-Sullivan	March 4, 2015	March 14, 2015	216a	1.39
42b	16b	"Pups Save the Fireworks"	Kim Duran	March 4, 2015	March 14, 2015	216b	1.39
43a	17a	"Pups Save a Sniffle"	Ursula Ziegler-Sullivan	April 7, 2015	March 21, 2015	217a	1.93
43b	17b	"Pups and the Ghost Cabin"	Scott Albert	April 7, 2015	March 21, 2015	217b	1.93
44a	18a	"Pups Save an Adventure"	Scott Albert	April 9, 2015	May 27, 2015	218a	N/A
44b	18b	"Pups Save a Surprise"	Kim Duran	April 9, 2015	May 27, 2015	218b	N/A
45	19	"Pup-Fu!"	Ursula Ziegler-Sullivan	October 16, 2015	September 1, 2015	219	1.68
46a	20a	"Pups Save the Mayor's Race"	Kim Duran	May 12, 2015	TBA	220a	1.34
46b	20b	"Pups Save an Outlaw's Loot"	Franklin Young	May 12, 2015	TBA	220b	1.34
47a	21a	"Pups Save Walinda"	Ursula Ziegler-Sullivan	May 14, 2015	TBA	221a	1.35
47b	21b	"Pups Save a Big Bone"	Scott Albert	May 14, 2015	TBA	221b	1.35
48a	22a	"Pups Save a Floundering Francois"	Scott Albert	May 29, 2015	TBA	222a	1.30
48b	22b	"Pups Save the Pop-Up Penguins"	Kim Duran	May 29, 2015	TBA	222b	1.30
49a	23a	"Pups Save a Snowboard Competition"	Elizabeth Keyishian	December 4, 2015	September 3, 2015	223a	1.23
49b	23b	"Pups Save a Chicken of the Sea"	Ursula Ziegler-Sullivan	December 4, 2015	September 3, 2015	223b	1.23
50a	24a	"Pups Save a Pizza"	Kim Duran	August 24, 2015	August 27, 2015	224a	1.49
50b	24b	"Pups Save Skye"	Kim Duran	August 24, 2015	August 27, 2015	224b	1.49
51a	25a	"Pups Save the Woof and Roll Show"	Kim Duran	September 18, 2015	September 15, 2015	225a	1.17
51b	25b	"Pups Save an Eagle"	Scott Albert	September 18, 2015	September 15, 2015	225b	1.17
52	26	"Pups Bark with Dinosaurs"	Ursula Ziegler-Sullivan	October 2, 2015	September 16, 2015	226	1.19

=== Season 3 (2015–17) ===
No. overall	No. in season	Title	Written by	U.S. air date	Canadian air date	Prod. code	U.S. viewers (millions)
53a	1a	"Pups Find a Genie"	Kim Duran	November 20, 2015	November 28, 2015	301a	1.40
53b	1b	"Pups Save a Tightrope Walker"	Charles Johnston	November 20, 2015	November 28, 2015	301b	1.40
54a	2a	"Pups Save a Goldrush"	Scott Albert	April 21, 2016	January 9, 2016	302a	1.22
54b	2b	"Pups Save the PAW Patroller"	Scott Albert	April 21, 2016	January 9, 2016	302b	1.22
The pups take a break from washing the PAW Patroller. When they return, the PAW Patroller is missing because Mayor Humdinger wants to use its TV to watch his favorite show when the Kitten Catastrophe Crew accidentally break his big screen.
55a	3a	"Pups Save the Soccer Game"	Hugh Duffy	January 22, 2016	January 16, 2016	303a	1.56
55b	3b	"Pups Save a Lucky Collar"	Alex Ganetakos	January 22, 2016	January 16, 2016	303b	1.56
56a	4a	"Pups Save Alex's Mini-Patrol"	Michael Stokes	March 22, 2016	February 18, 2016	304a	1.33
56b	4b	"Pups Save a Lost Tooth"	Kim Duran	March 22, 2016	February 18, 2016	304b	1.33
57	5	"Air Pups"	Scott Albert	January 29, 2016	February 13, 2016	305	1.61
After the pups receive their new air gears, they use their new Air Patroller to find a family of monkeys working with Cap'n Turbot and Francois on Volcano Island.
58	6	"Pups Save Friendship Day"	Michael Stokes	February 12, 2016	March 5, 2016	306	1.39
59a	7a	"Pups Save Apollo"	Charles Johnston	May 3, 2016	March 31, 2016	307a	1.34
As the PAW Patrol watch a marathon of "Apollo the Super-Pup", Rubble falls asleep and dreams that Apollo has been captured by the Spider King alongside the rabbits and needs the PAW Patrol's help. With Rubble having to face his fear of spiders, the PAW Patrol work to rescue Apollo and the rabbits while coming up with a way to defeat the Spider King.
59b	7b	"Pups Save the Hippos"	Jeff Sweeney	May 3, 2016	March 31, 2016	307b	1.34
Zuma feels left out when he cannot assist in a mission involving a trio of circus hippos. But eventually, he manages to help out when Alex lets them out of their enclosure.
60a	8a	"Pups Save Daring Danny X"	Hugh Duffy	March 24, 2016	April 16, 2016	308a	1.73
60b	8b	"Pups in a Fix"	Jeff Sweeney	March 24, 2016	April 16, 2016	308b	1.73
61a	9a	"Pups Save a Dragon"	Kim Duran	April 19, 2016	April 30, 2016	309a	1.21
61b	9b	"Pups Save Three Little Pigs"	Alex Ganetakos	April 19, 2016	April 30, 2016	309b	1.21
62a	10a	"Pups Save a Stinky Flower"	Hugh Duffy	October 18, 2016	May 12, 2016	310a	1.06
62b	10b	"Pups Save a Monkey-naut"	Kim Duran	October 18, 2016	May 12, 2016	310b	1.06
63a	11a	"Pups Save the Polar Bears"	Kim Duran	May 5, 2016	May 19, 2016	311a	1.32
63b	11b	"A Pup in Sheep's Clothing"	Steven Sullivan	May 5, 2016	May 19, 2016	311b	1.32
64a	12a	"Pups Save a School Bus"	Andrew Guerdat	May 24, 2016	May 26, 2016	312a	1.44
64b	12b	"Pups Save the Songbirds"	Kim Duran	May 24, 2016	May 26, 2016	312b	1.44
65a	13a	"Pups Save Old Trusty"	Jeff Sweeney and James Backshall	May 26, 2016	July 23, 2016	313a	1.21
65b	13b	"Pups Save a Pony"	Scott Albert	May 26, 2016	July 23, 2016	313b	1.21
66a	14a	"Pups Save a Robo-Saurus"	Steven Sullivan	October 10, 2016	June 23, 2016	314a	1.54
66b	14b	"Pups Save a Film Festival"	Jeff Sweeney and James Backshall	October 10, 2016	August 20, 2016	314b	1.54
67	15	"Tracker Joins the Pups!"	Andrew Guerdat and Steven Sullivan	September 16, 2016	August 13, 2016	315	1.59
After saving Carlos, the PAW Patrol's newest member Tracker helps them to find an ancient crown which is taken by monkeys.
68a	16a	"Pups Bear-ly Save Danny"	Steven Sullivan	October 20, 2016	August 14, 2016	316a	1.04
68b	16b	"Pups Save the Mayor's Tulips"	Kim Duran	October 20, 2016	August 14, 2016	316b	1.04
Chase and Rocky are left in charge of guarding Mayor Goodway's tulips for Adventure Bay's flower competition as Mayor Humdinger and the Kitten Catastrophe Crew plan to ruin them.
69a	17a	"All Star Pups!"	Andrew Guerdat	August 22, 2016	August 20, 2016	317a	1.22
69b	17b	"Pups Save Sports Day"	Scott Albert	August 22, 2016	June 23, 2016	317b	1.22
70a	18a	"Pups in a Jam"	James Backshall and Jeff Sweeney	November 11, 2016	August 21, 2016	318a	1.95
70b	18b	"Pups Save a Windsurfing Pig"	Kim Duran	November 11, 2016	August 21, 2016	318b	1.95
71a	19a	"Pups Get Growing"	James Backshall and Jeff Sweeney	November 8, 2016	September 17, 2016	319a	1.43
71b	19b	"Pups Save a Space Toy"	Andrew Guerdat	November 8, 2016	September 17, 2016	319b	1.43
72a	20a	"Pups Get Skunked"	Charles Johnston	December 1, 2016	September 24, 2016	320a	1.25
The pups' hunt for berries is cut short when Everest is sprayed by a skunk and Marshall gets his skunk allergies, so they take her to Katie's Pet Parlor for Katie to clean her off. Meanwhile, the skunk scares everyone in Adventure Bay leaving Ryder and the pups to fix the situation.
72b	20b	"Pups and a Whale of a Tale"	Andrew Guerdat	December 1, 2016	September 24, 2016	320b	1.25
73a	21a	"Parroting Pups"	Andy Guerdat	September 16, 2016	December 3, 2016	321a	1.52
During a trip to the jungle, the Paw Patrol help Carlos build a tree house so that he can watch the hatching of baby snake eggs without disturbing the mother snake. However, while building the tree house, Rocky loses his voice and can’t make his pup pack work, so Carlos’ parrot Matea helps with imitation to build the tree house.
73b	21b	"Merpups Save the Turbots"	Scott Albert	September 16, 2016	December 3, 2016	321b	1.52
The Magical Mer-Moon has returned, and while Captain Turbot and Francois are in their diving bell looking for the Merpups, a sea slug falls asleep on the diving bell leaving them stranded. With the help of Marshall (who got turned into a Merpup himself) and the Merpups, Ryder, Zuma, and Rocky must help save the Turbots and free the diving bell.
74	22	"The Pups' Winter Wonder Show"	James Backshall and Jeff Sweeney	December 2, 2016	December 1, 2016	322	1.50
75a	23a	"Pups Save the Gliding Turbots"	Charles Johnston	November 29, 2016	December 17, 2016	323a	1.31
75b	23b	"Pups Save a Plane"	Charles Johnston	November 29, 2016	December 17, 2016	323b	1.31
76a	24a	"Pups Save a Giant Plant"	Steve Sullivan	January 20, 2017	December 31, 2016	324a	1.51
76b	24b	"Pups Get Stuck"	James Backshall and Jeff Sweeney	January 20, 2017	December 31, 2016	324b	1.51
77a	25a	"Pups Raise the PAW Patroller"	Andrew Guerdat	January 24, 2017	January 7, 2017	325a	1.53
The Paw Patroller lands in the bay when Daring Danny X tries to use it for a trick but then it backfires. Ryder and the pups must help to raise the Paw Patroller when it sinks.
77b	25b	"Pups Save the Crows"	James Backshall and Jeff Sweeney	January 24, 2017	January 7, 2017	325b	1.53
78a	26a	"Pups Save Their Floating Friends"	Scott Albert	January 26, 2017	January 14, 2017	326a	1.34
78b	26b	"Pups Save a Satellite"	Alex Ganetakos	January 26, 2017	January 14, 2017	326b	1.34

=== Season 4 (2017–18) ===
No. overall	No. in season	Title	Written by	U.S. air date	Canadian air date	Prod. code	U.S. viewers (millions)
79a	1a	"Pups Save a Blimp"	Steve Sullivan and Andy Guerdat	February 6, 2017	March 4, 2017	401a	1.41
79b	1b	"Pups Save the Chili Cook-Off"	Alex Ganetakos	February 6, 2017	March 4, 2017	401b	1.41
80a	2a	"Pups Save a Teeny Penguin"	Andy Guerdat and Steve Sullivan	February 8, 2017	March 11, 2017	402a	1.54
80b	2b	"Pups Save the Cat Show"	James Backshall and Jeff Sweeney	February 8, 2017	March 11, 2017	402b	1.54
The pups try to locate a group of cats after Adventure Bay's cat show is sabotaged. Meanwhile, Mayor Humdinger creates a robotic cat named Meow-Meow to compete in the show only for Katie's cat Cali and sabotage from the Kitten Catastrophe Crew to spoil his trick.
81a	3a	"Pups Save a Playful Dragon"	Charles Johnston	April 7, 2017	March 18, 2017	403a	1.58
81b	3b	"Pups Save the Critters"	Charles Johnston	April 7, 2017	March 18, 2017	403b	1.58
82	4	"Mission PAW: Quest for the Crown"	Steve Sullivan and Andy Guerdat	March 24, 2017	March 25, 2017	404	1.89
Chase is dispatched to Barkingburg to guard a crown that will be used at the Princess of Barkingburg's coronation. Unfortunately, her dog Sweetie plans to take the crown, and traps Chase framing him for the theft. It's up to the rest of the PAW Patrol to rescue Chase and retrieve the crown to expose Sweetie and clear Chase’s name.
83a	5a	"Pups Save a Sleepover"	Steve Sullivan and Andy Guerdat	April 28, 2017	May 6, 2017	405a	1.16
83b	5b	"Pups Save the Carnival"	Louise Moon	April 28, 2017	May 6, 2017	405b	1.16
84a	6a	"Pups Save Jake's Cake"	Steve Sullivan and Andy Guerdat	April 21, 2017	May 13, 2017	406a	1.44
The pups must bring an enormous ice cream cake to the top of a mountain.
84b	6b	"Pups Save a Wild Ride"	James Backshall and Jeff Sweeney	April 21, 2017	May 13, 2017	406b	1.44
The pups use special "I Do, You Do" bracelets to help them learn dance moves. Later, they rescue Alex and Daring Danny X snowboard toward the Risky Ridge.
85a	7a	"Mission PAW: Royally Spooked"	Steve Sullivan and Andy Guerdat	April 14, 2017	May 20, 2017	407a	1.94
The PAW Patrol is summoned to Barkingburg to investigate a series of ghost sightings in Barkingburg Castle. They are unaware that Sweetie is being this in her latest attempt to become Barkingburg's ruler.
85b	7b	"Pups Save Monkey-dinger"	Scott Albert	April 14, 2017	May 20, 2017	407b	1.94
86a	8a	"Pups Save the Flying Food"	Steve Sullivan and Andy Guerdat	May 12, 2017	May 27, 2017	408a	1.40
86b	8b	"Pups Save a Ferris Wheel"	Charles Johnston	May 12, 2017	May 27, 2017	408b	1.40
87a	9a	"Pups Save a Sleepwalking Bear"	Louise Moon	October 6, 2017	June 17, 2017	409a	1.11
87b	9b	"Pups Save Dude Ranch Danny"	Steve Sullivan and Andy Guerdat	October 6, 2017	June 17, 2017	409b	1.11
88	10	"Mission PAW: Pups Save the Royal Throne"	Steve Sullivan and Andy Guerdat	May 26, 2017	June 24, 2017	410	1.55
The Princess of Barkingburg receives a new throne as Sweetie plans to obtain it. When she manages to swipe it during a smokescreen from a rigged camera, Sweetie and Busby take control of the Air Patroller so that Sweetie can be queen somewhere else. The PAW Patrol must chase Sweetie to different locations in order to reclaim the throne.
89a	11a	"Pups Save Big Hairy"	James Backshall and Jeff Sweeney	August 25, 2017	July 1, 2017	411a	1.25
After the PAW Patrol and Tracker help tend to the monkeys, they are followed back to Adventure Bay by a giant monkey named Big Hairy who wants to make use of Rocky's claw attachment to scratch his back. It's up to the PAW Patrol to stop Big Hairy's rampage and come up with a solution to deal with him.
89b	11b	"Pups Save a Flying Kitty"	Al Schwartz	August 25, 2017	July 1, 2017	411b	1.25
90a	12a	"Pups Party with Bats"	Louise Moon	November 10, 2017	July 8, 2017	412a	1.21
90b	12b	"Pups Save Sensei Yumi"	Scott Albert	November 10, 2017	July 8, 2017	412b	1.21
91	13	"Sea Patrol: Pups Save a Baby Octopus"	James Backshall and Jeff Sweeney	July 7, 2017	September 9, 2017	413	2.50
During the opening day of Adventure Beach, the PAW Patrol save Cap'n Turbot's boat, the Flounder is sunk by a large pink octopus while Rocky overcomes his dislike for water in order to help bring the baby octopus back to its mother.
92a	14a	"Pups Save the Runaway Kitties"	Steve Sullivan and Andy Guerdat	August 21, 2017	September 16, 2017	414a	1.40
The PAW Patrol tracks down the floating Kitten Catastrophe Crew after they wound up from Katie's super bubble bath and got dried off too fast.
92b	14b	"Pups Save Tiny Marshall"	Tom Berger	August 21, 2017	September 16, 2017	414b	1.40
Marshall takes a nap after a game of "pup ball" and dreams that he has been shrunk down to the size of an ant.
93a	15a	"Pups Chill Out"	Louise Moon	August 23, 2017	September 23, 2017	415a	1.34
93b	15b	"Pups Save Farmer Alex"	Al Schwartz	August 23, 2017	September 23, 2017	415b	1.34
94a	16a	"Sea Patrol: Pups Save a Shark"	Scott Albert	September 8, 2017	September 30, 2017	416a	1.44
When Mayor Humdinger makes a shark submarine in order to scare everyone and have Adventure Beach to himself, the Paw Patrol must investigate and find out whats going on.
94b	16b	"Sea Patrol: Pups Save the Pier"	Al Schwartz	September 8, 2017	September 30, 2017	416b	1.44
When Francois’ jellyfish jam sculpture spills on the pier and causes sea creatures to destroy the pier trying to taste the jam, its up to the Paw Patrol to fix the pier and save the upcoming art show.
95a	17a	"Pups Save a Space Rock"	Louise Moon	September 19, 2017	October 7, 2017	417a	1.33
95b	17b	"Pups Save a Good Mayor"	James Backshall and Jeff Sweeney	September 19, 2017	October 7, 2017	417b	1.33
Mayor Humdinger poses as the substitute mayor and Mayor Goodway is nowhere to be found while camping. Ryder, Skye, and Everest search Goodway and bring her back to town in order to deal with Humdinger.
96a	18a	"Pups Save a City Kitty"	Andy Guerdat and Steve Sullivan	September 21, 2017	October 14, 2017	418a	1.06
96b	18b	"Pups Save a Cloud Surfer"	James Backshall and Jeff Sweeney	September 21, 2017	October 14, 2017	418b	1.06
97	19	"Sea Patrol: Pirate Pups to the Rescue"	Steve Sullivan and Andy Guerdat	October 20, 2017	October 21, 2017	419	1.07
The Sea Patrol dress up as pirates and turn their Sea Patroller into a pirate ship to help save Carlos and Tracker when they get stranded on an island while searching for treasure.
98a	20a	"Pups Save the Mail"	Al Schwartz	October 27, 2017	February 10, 2018	420a	1.51
98b	20b	"Pups Save a Frog Mayor"	Louise Moon	October 27, 2017	February 10, 2018	420b	1.51
Rubble dreams that the new wishing well has turned Mayor Goodway into a frog. He enlists the PAW Patrol to help find Mayor Goodway so that she can have her turned back to normal.
99a	21a	"Pups Save the Runaway Turtles"	Scott Albert	November 7, 2017	February 17, 2018	421a	1.03
99b	21b	"Pups Save the Shivering Sheep"	James Backshall and Jeff Sweeney	November 7, 2017	February 17, 2018	421b	1.03
Farmer Al tries out a new sheep shearing invention that ends up working too well. When the Kitten Casatrophe Crew get stuck in a large wool ball, Mayor Humdinger borrow's Farmer Al's phone to enlist the PAW Patrol for help.
100a	22a	"Sea Patrol: Pups Save a Frozen Flounder"	Scott Albert	November 6, 2017	January 6, 2018	422a	1.13
When the Flounder gets frozen in ice, the Sea Patrol have to rescue Captain Turbot and Francois before they freeze over.
100b	22b	"Sea Patrol: Pups Save a Narwhal"	Louise Moon	November 6, 2017	January 6, 2018	422b	1.13
At the beach, the people of Adventure Bay see a strange aquatic creature that looks like it's part unicorn, part lion, and part leopard off their shore and the PAW Patrol are called in to look into it. With help from Cap'n Turbot, Ryder and the PAW Patrol learn that it is a narwhal as they learn some narwhal language to help get it back to the Arctic with everyone watching on the screen.
101a	23a	"Pups Save Luke Stars"	Louise Moon	March 6, 2018	January 13, 2018	423a	1.03
101b	23b	"Pups Save Chicken Day"	Jason McKenzie	March 6, 2018	January 13, 2018	423b	1.03
102a	24a	"Pups Save Francois the Penguin"	Al Schwartz	January 30, 2018	January 20, 2018	424a	1.25
102b	24b	"Pups Save Daring Danny's Hippo"	Andy Guerdat and Steve Sullivan	January 30, 2018	January 20, 2018	424b	1.25
103a	25a	"Pups Save Baby Humdinger"	Hugh Duffy	February 1, 2018	January 27, 2018	425a	1.09
Tracker dreams about Mayor Humdinger drinking from a specific coconut that turns him into a baby. He enlists the PAW Patrol to tend to baby Humdinger and find a coconut that would be the antidote needed to restore him to normal.
103b	25b	"Pups Save a Piñata"	Hugh Duffy	February 1, 2018	January 27, 2018	425b	1.09
104	26	"Sea Patrol: Pups Save Puplantis"	Story by : Andy Guerdat and Steve Sullivan; Teleplay by : Louise Moon	January 15, 2018	February 3, 2018	426	1.95
The PAW Patrol and Cap'n Turbot reunite with the Merpups as they are taken to the underwater city of Puplantis where a giant clam makes large pearls. This giant clam is soon targeted by the pirate Sid Swashbuckle and his first mate Arrby.

=== Season 5 (2018–19) ===
No. overall	No. in season	Title	Written by	U.S. air date	Canadian air date	Prod. code	U.S. viewers (millions)
105a	1a	"Pups Save the Kitty Rescue Crew"	Louise Moon	February 6, 2018	April 7, 2018	501a	1.21
105b	1b	"Pups Save an Ostrich"	James Backshall and Jeff Sweeney	February 6, 2018	April 7, 2018	501b	1.21
106a	2a	"Pups Save Big Paw"	Louise Moon	February 8, 2018	July 7, 2018	502a	1.03
106b	2b	"Pups Save the Hum-Mover"	Michael Stokes	February 8, 2018	July 7, 2018	502b	1.03
107a	3a	"Sea Patrol: Pups Save a Sunken Sloop"	Hugh Duffy	February 19, 2018	July 14, 2018	503a	1.33
Mayor Goodway and Farmer Yumi go scuba-diving and look for a legendary creature that lives in a suken sloop. The suken sloop is then taken by Sid Swashbuckle the Pirate and his pirate canine Arrby, and Ryder and the pups must stop the pirates and save the sea slug that is revealed to live in the sunken sloop.
107b	3b	"Sea Patrol: Pups Save a Wiggly Whale"	James Backshall and Jeff Sweeney	February 19, 2018	July 14, 2018	503b	1.33
108a	4a	"Pups Save a High-Flying Skye"	Michael Stokes	March 8, 2018	July 21, 2018	504a	1.43
108b	4b	"Pups Go for the Gold"	Andy Guerdat and Steve Sullivan	March 8, 2018	July 21, 2018	504b	1.43
109a	5a	"Pups Save an Extreme Lunch"	Scott Albert	March 30, 2018	July 28, 2018	505a	1.30
The pups made their own restaurant called "The Puppy Café" for Ryder. While in a canyon, Mr. Porter and Alex see Daring Danny X do a bicycling tightrope stunt that involves him eating an extreme lunch. When the strong winds interfere, Mr. Porter calls in the PAW Patrol to rescue Daring Danny X.
109b	5b	"Pups Save a Cat Burglar"	Al Schwartz	March 30, 2018	July 28, 2018	505b	1.30
110a	6a	"Sea Patrol: Pups Save the Flying Diving Bell"	Louise Moon	April 20, 2018	August 4, 2018	506a	1.02
110b	6b	"Sea Patrol: Pups Save a Soggy Farm"	Andy Guerdat and Steve Sullivan	April 20, 2018	August 4, 2018	506b	1.02
111a	7a	"Pups Save the Butterflies"	Michael Stokes	May 3, 2018	August 11, 2018	507a	0.76
111b	7b	"Pups Save an Underground Chicken"	Hugh Duffy	May 3, 2018	August 11, 2018	507b	0.76
112a	8a	"Pups Save the Bookmobile"	Michael Stokes	May 1, 2018	August 18, 2018	508a	0.92
112b	8b	"Pups Save Heady Humdinger"	Michael Stokes	May 1, 2018	August 18, 2018	508b	0.92
113	9	"Sea Patrol: Pups Save Their Pirated Sea Patroller"	Andy Guerdat and Steve Sullivan	May 25, 2018	August 25, 2018	509	1.10
Sid Swashbuckle and Arrby steal the Sea Patroller from the PAW Patrol during their mission. With Marshall still onboard, he must work on a plan to reclaim it and reunite with the PAW Patrol.
114a	10a	"Pups Save the PawPaws"	James Backshall and Jeff Sweeney	June 28, 2018	September 1, 2018	510a	1.30
114b	10b	"Pups Save a Popped Top"	Andy Guerdat and Steve Sullivan	June 28, 2018	September 1, 2018	510b	1.30
115	11	"Ultimate Rescue: Pups Save the Royal Kitties"	Al Schwartz	June 22, 2018	September 8, 2018	511	1.61
The Princess of Barkingburg's royal kittens are coming to town. Mayor Humdinger kidnaps them in order to use them in his heist on a diamond. Chase leads the PAW Patrol in an Ultimate Police Rescue.
116a	12a	"Pups Save the Snowshoeing Goodways"	Louise Moon	July 17, 2018	September 15, 2018	512a	1.38
116b	12b	"Pups Save a Duck Pond"	James Backshall and Jeff Sweeney	July 17, 2018	September 15, 2018	512b	1.38
117a	13a	"Sea Patrol: Pups Save Tilly Turbot"	Al Schwartz	July 19, 2018	September 22, 2018	513a	1.11
117b	13b	"Pups Save an Upset Elephant"	Louise Moon	July 19, 2018	September 22, 2018	513b	1.11
118	14	"Ultimate Rescue: Pups Save the Tigers"	Michael Stokes	August 10, 2018	December 22, 2018	514	1.69
Cap'n Turbot and Francoise are visiting an island where some rare white tigers reside. When they get trapped in a volcano, Skye leads the PAW Patrol in an Ultimate Air Rescue.
119a	15a	"Rocky Saves Himself"	Hugh Duffy	September 3, 2018	December 25, 2018	515a	1.24
While Rocky is on a junk-filled island, Mayor Humdinger and the Kitten Catastrophe Crew steal his tugboat. He must now use the junk in a plan to get off the island.
119b	15b	"Pups and the Mystery of the Driverless Snow Cat"	Andy Guerdat and Steve Sullivan	September 3, 2018	December 25, 2018	515b	1.24
120a	16a	"Pups Save the Trick-or-Treaters"	Louise Moon	October 8, 2018	January 12, 2019	516a	1.27
120b	16b	"Pups Save an Out of Control Mini Patrol"	Jason McKenzie	October 8, 2018	January 12, 2019	516b	1.27
121	17	"Ultimate Rescue: Pups Save the Movie Monster"	Scott Albert	September 21, 2018	December 15, 2018	517	1.03
When filming for Francois as a superhero who fights a robot monster called Gigantasaur, Mayor Humdinger steals the Gigantasaur so he can be filmed in Foggy Bottom. Marshall leads the PAW Patrol in an Ultimate Fire Rescue.
122	18	"Mission PAW: Pups Save a Royal Concert"	Louise Moon	October 26, 2018	December 25, 2018	518	1.04
122	18	"Mission PAW: Pups Save the Princess' Pals"	Michael Stokes	October 26, 2018	December 25, 2018	518	1.04
Luke Stars is performing in Barkingburg. Sweetie plans to dispose of Luke Stars so that she can perform instead. It's up to the PAW Patrol to find Luke Stars before his show begins. While the Princess of Barkingburg is away, Sweetie plans to take over with help from the injured animals in the Princess of Barkingburg's possession. It's up to the PAW Patrol to round up the animals and defeat Sweetie.
123a	19a	"Pups and the Werepuppy"	Michael Stokes	October 12, 2018	January 19, 2019	519a	1.15
Otis Goodway tells the PAW Patrol the story of the werepuppy and how any puppy can turn into it. After seeing his reflection in the lake during the full moon, Rocky dreams that he has turned into a werepuppy and runs off to look for a valley of sunflowers that would help cure him. The PAW Patrol look for him as they help Cap'n Turbot, Francoise, and Ms. Marjorie along the way.
123b	19b	"Pups Save a Sleepwalking Mayor"	Al Schwartz	October 12, 2018	January 19, 2019	519b	1.15
124a	20a	"Ultimate Rescue: Pups Save a Swamp Monster"	Al Schwartz	November 30, 2018	January 26, 2019	520a	1.23
Cap'n Turbot and Francois lead Mayor Goodway, Julia, and Julius on a swamp tour until they spot a giant catfish in trouble. Zuma must lead the PAW Patrol in an Ultimate Swamp Rescue.
124b	20b	"Ultimate Rescue: Pups and the Hidden Golden Bones"	Hugh Duffy	November 30, 2018	January 26, 2019	520b	1.23
Mayor Humdinger heads underneath Adventure Bay to find the fabled golden bones. His work down there starts making the grounds beneath city hall unstable. Rocky must lead the PAW Patrol in an Ultimate Fix-It Rescue.
125a	21a	"Pups Save a Cuckoo Clock"	Louise Moon	November 16, 2018	February 2, 2019	521a	1.20
125b	21b	"Pups Save Ms. Marjorie's House"	Michael Stokes	November 16, 2018	February 2, 2019	521b	1.20
126a	22a	"Pups Save Thanksgiving"	Hugh Duffy	November 21, 2018	February 9, 2019	522a	1.41
126b	22b	"Pups Save a Windy Bay"	James Backshall and Jeff Sweeney	November 21, 2018	February 9, 2019	522b	1.41
127a	23a	"Pups Save a Frozen Camp Out"	Andy Guerdat and Steve Sullivan	December 14, 2018	March 2, 2019	523a	1.07
Mr. Porter and Alex are camping out on an island when it starts to get snowy. They call in the PAW Patrol to help get them off the snow-covered island as Skye helps Everest in having her first air rescue.
127b	23b	"Pups Save the Fizzy Pickles"	Scott Albert	December 14, 2018	March 2, 2019	523b	1.07
128a	24a	"Pups Save a Pluck-O-Matic"	James Backshall and Jeff Sweeney	December 31, 2018	February 23, 2019	524a	1.45
128b	24b	"Pups Save a Mascot"	Louise Moon	December 31, 2018	February 23, 2019	524b	1.45
129	25	"Ultimate Rescue: Pups Save a Runaway Stargazer"	Andy Guerdat and Steve Sullivan	January 21, 2019	February 16, 2019	525	1.43
A comet will be passing in the sky at night. Wanting the comet for himself, Mayor Humdinger plans to steal the stargazer which goes comically awry when it starts to move out of control. Rubble must lead the PAW Patrol in an Ultimate Construction Rescue.
130a	26a	"Pups Save Ace's Birthday Surprise"	Louise Moon	January 25, 2019	March 9, 2019	526a	1.28
130b	26b	"Pups Save a Tower of Pizza"	Debra Felstead and Ross McKie	January 25, 2019	March 9, 2019	526b	1.28

=== Season 6 (2019–21) ===
No. overall	No. in season	Title	Written by	U.S. air date	Canadian air date	Prod. code	U.S. viewers (millions)
131a	1a	"Pups Save the Jungle Penguins"	Hugh Duffy	February 22, 2019	May 18, 2019	601a	0.93
131b	1b	"Pups Save a Freighter"	Hugh Duffy	February 22, 2019	May 18, 2019	601b	0.93
132a	2a	"Ultimate Rescue: Pups Stop a Meltdown"	James Backshall and Jeff Sweeney	March 4, 2019	May 25, 2019	602a	0.90
Cap'n Turbot and Francois are transporting a new lens for their lighthouse and are driving carefully. When the lens ends up making certain parts of Adventure Bay hot, Marshall must lead the PAW Patrol in an Ultimate Fire Rescue.
132b	2b	"Ultimate Rescue: Pups and the Mystery of the Missing Cell Phones"	Hugh Duffy	March 4, 2019	May 25, 2019	602b	0.90
People's cell phones have been disappearing where the only connection is a phone game music that was playing at the time. Chase must lead the PAW Patrol in an Ultimate Police Rescue to find who took the missing cell phones.
133a	3a	"Pups Save a Melon Festival"	James Backshall and Jeff Sweeney	March 15, 2019	June 1, 2019	603a	0.89
133b	3b	"Pups Save a Cow"	Al Schwartz	March 15, 2019	June 1, 2019	603b	0.89
134a	4a	"Pups Save the Honey"	Louise Moon	April 26, 2019	June 8, 2019	604a	0.90
134b	4b	"Pups Save Mayor Goodway's Purse"	Al Schwartz	April 26, 2019	June 8, 2019	604b	0.90
135a	5a	"Ultimate Rescue: Pups Save the Mountain Climbers"	James Backshall and Jeff Sweeney	April 19, 2019	June 15, 2019	605a	1.20
Mayor Goodway, Cap'n Turbot, Francoise, and Daring Danny X end up in different types of peril on top of a mountain. Skye must lead the PAW Patrol in an Ultimate Air Rescue to save everyone.
135b	5b	"Ultimate Rescue: Pups Save Captain Gordy"	Hugh Duffy	April 19, 2019	June 15, 2019	605b	1.20
Captain Gordy's rocket is going to be coming out of orbit. After Ryder is told by Mission Control that Captain Gordy's rocket is off course, Rubble leads the PAW Patrol in an Ultimate Construction Rescue to set up a new landing platform which keeps changing locations due to the rocket's trajectory.
136a	6a	"Pups and the Stinky Bubble Trouble"	Andy Guerdat and Steve Sullivan	May 3, 2019	June 22, 2019	606a	0.64
136b	6b	"Pups Save the Baby Ostriches"	Jeff Sweeney	May 3, 2019	June 22, 2019	606b	0.64
137a	7a	"Pups Save Gustavo's Guitar"	Louise Moon	May 27, 2019	June 29, 2019	607a	1.05
137b	7b	"Pups Save the Yoga Goats"	Al Schwartz	May 27, 2019	June 29, 2019	607b	1.05
138a	8a	"Pups Save Bedtime"	David Rosenberg	September 3, 2019	July 6, 2019	608a	0.59
138b	8b	"Pups Save Chickaletta's Egg"	James Backshall	September 3, 2019	July 6, 2019	608b	0.59
139	9	"Mighty Pups, Super Paws: When Super Kitties Attack"	Andy Guerdat and Steve Sullivan	June 28, 2019	July 13, 2019	609	0.93
During Harold Humdinger's latest plot, the Kitten Catastrophe Crew get exposed to the meteor fragment and gain powers similar to the PAW Patrol.
140a	10a	"Pups Save a Manatee"	Robin J. Stein	September 4, 2019	July 20, 2019	610a	0.58
140b	10b	"Pups Save Breakfast"	Clark Stubbs	September 4, 2019	July 20, 2019	610b	0.58
141a	11a	"Pups Save the Land Pirates"	Andy Guerdat and Steve Sullivan	September 5, 2019	July 27, 2019	611a	0.51
141b	11b	"Pups Save the Birdwatching Turbots"	Louise Moon	September 5, 2019	July 27, 2019	611b	0.51
142	12	"Mighty Pups, Super Paws: Pups Meet the Mighty Twins"	Andy Guerdat and Steve Sullivan	July 26, 2019	August 3, 2019	612	1.16
As the PAW Patrol are washing everyone's cars, a villain called Ladybird enters town and starts targeting shiny stuff. After being driven off by two pups named Tuck and Ella, Ladybird comes across a meteor fragment that grants her flight and super-strength. When she starts stealing larger shiny stuff, the Mighty Pups get help from Tuck and Ella in retrieving the stolen stuff and defeating Ladybird.
143a	13a	"Pups Save a Freaky Pup-Day"	David Rosenberg	November 12, 2019	August 10, 2019	613a	0.72
143b	13b	"Pups Save a Runaway Mayor"	Robin J. Stein	November 12, 2019	August 10, 2019	613b	0.72
144a	14a	"Pups Save a Bat Family"	Louise Moon	October 4, 2019	October 12, 2019	614a	0.76
144b	14b	"Pups Save a Mud Monster"	James Backshall	October 4, 2019	October 12, 2019	614b	0.76
145a	15a	"Mighty Pups, Super Paws: Pups Save a Giant Chicken"	Al Schwartz	September 2, 2019	October 19, 2019	615a	1.24
Ladybird has returned and has gained another meteor fragment. The same meteor fragment causes Chickaletta to grow to giant size as Ladybird takes advantage of Chickaletta's obedience through bells. It's up to the PAW Patrol to regain control of Chickaletta and defeat Ladybird.
145b	15b	"Mighty Pups, Super Paws: Pups Stop Harold's Deep Freeze"	James Backshall	September 2, 2019	October 19, 2019	615b	1.24
Coming across another meteor fragment, Harold Humdinger creates a new invention that starts freezing everything in Adventure Bay. It's up to the PAW Patrol to thaw everything and defeat Harold Humdinger.
146a	16a	"Pups Save the Balloon Pups"	David Rosenberg	November 27, 2019	October 26, 2019	616a	1.12
146b	16b	"Pups Save the Spider Spies"	Robin J. Stein	November 27, 2019	October 26, 2019	616b	1.12
147a	17a	"Pups Save the Bears"	Clark Stubbs	November 13, 2019	November 2, 2019	617a	0.63
147b	17b	"Pups Save a Farmerless Farm"	Al Schwartz and James Backshall	November 13, 2019	November 2, 2019	617b	0.63
148a	18a	"Mighty Pups, Super Paws: Pups and the Big Twin Trick"	Andy Guerdat and Steve Sullivan	October 11, 2019	November 9, 2019	618a	0.83
Ladybird has returned and gained another meteor fragment as she gains control of two large dog statues on display at city hall. Now Tuck and Ella must pull off a trick that is needed to fool and defeat Ladybird.
148b	18b	"Mighty Pups, Super Paws: Pups Save a Mega Mayor"	Robin J. Stein	October 11, 2019	November 9, 2019	618b	0.83
Mayor Humdinger finally gets his hands on a meteor fragment. Unfortunately, it turns him into a purple-skinned hulking being who starts to look for every cat in Adventure Bay. It's up to the PAW Patrol to rescue the cats and get the meteor fragment away from Mayor Humdinger.
149a	19a	"Pups Save a White Wolf"	David Rosenberg	December 20, 2019	November 16, 2019	619a	0.68
149b	19b	"Pups Save a Wrong Way Explorer"	Andy Guerdat and Steve Sullivan	December 20, 2019	November 16, 2019	619b	0.68
150a	20a	"Pups Save the Squirrels"	James Backshall	November 14, 2019	November 23, 2019	620a	0.65
150b	20b	"Pups Save a Roo"	Jeff Sweeney	November 14, 2019	November 23, 2019	620b	0.65
151	21	"Mighty Pups, Charged Up: Pups vs. the Copycat"	Louise Moon	January 20, 2020	December 21, 2019	621	1.34
A reporter named Hailey Daily has come to Adventure Bay to interview the PAW Patrol. Her cat Mr. Nibbles finds his way to where the meteor is held and gets a fragment stuck in his teeth, gaining the capability of speech and the ability to copy the powers of the Mighty Pups. Mr. Nibbles becomes the supervillain Copycat and causes havoc in Adventure Bay while allying with Mayor Humdinger who takes on the alias of Foggy Mayor.
152a	22a	"Pups Save a Humsquatch"	Al Schwartz	January 27, 2020	January 11, 2020	622a	0.50
152b	22b	"Pups Stop a Far Flung Flying Disc"	James Backshall	January 27, 2020	January 11, 2020	622b	0.50
153a	23a	"Pups Rescue a Rescuer"	Robin J. Stein	February 28, 2020	January 18, 2020	623a	0.52
153b	23b	"Pups Save the Phantom of the Frog Pond"	Al Schwartz	February 28, 2020	January 18, 2020	623b	0.52
154a	24a	"Mighty Pups, Charged Up: Pups Stop a Big Bad Bot"	Andy Guerdat and Steve Sullivan	February 17, 2020	January 25, 2020	624a	0.99
154b	24b	"Mighty Pups, Charged Up: Pups vs. the Dome"	Al Schwartz	February 17, 2020	January 25, 2020	624b	0.99
Copycat returns and puts a dome over Adventure Bay with Mayor Humdinger allying with him again as Foggy Mayor. It's up to the Mighty Pups to bring down the dome and defeat Copycat.
155a	25a	"Ultimate Rescue: Pups Save the Opening Ceremonies"	Michael Stokes	July 23, 2021	February 15, 2020	625a	0.31
The Adventure Bay Games are going to be happening as everyone tries out for their respective sports. When Ms. Marjorie accidentally drops the torch needed to start the event into a gopher hole, it starts a fire along the roots of Adventure Bay's oldest tree. Marshall must now lead the PAW Patrol in an Ultimate Fire Rescue.
155b	25b	"Ultimate Rescue: Pups Save the Adventure Bay Games"	Michael Stokes	July 23, 2021	February 15, 2020	625b	0.31
Continuing from the last episode, the Adventure Bay Games have begun. Mayor Humdinger plans to claim the award medals his way by making off with them. Chase must now lead the PAW Patrol in an Ultimate Police Rescue to retrieve the stolen award medals.
156a	26a	"Pups Save a Tour Bus"	Sean Jara	March 13, 2020	February 22, 2020	626a	0.81
Posing as a tour guide named Top Hat Tommy, Mayor Humdinger takes control of a tour bus with help from his robot cat Meow-Meow in order to give people a tour of Foggy Bottom while discrediting Adventure Bay. When the tour bus goes out of control thanks to the Kitten Catastrophe Crew, it's up to the PAW Patrol to stop the runaway tour bus.
156b	26b	"Pups Save Midnight at the Museum"	Clark Stubbs	March 13, 2020	February 22, 2020	626b	0.81

=== Season 7 (2020–21) ===
No. overall	No. in season	Title	Written by	U.S. air date	Canadian air date	Prod. code	U.S. viewers (millions)
157a	1a	"Mighty Pups, Charged Up: Pups Stop a Humdinger Horde"	Robin J. Stein	March 27, 2020	May 2, 2020	701a	1.02
157b	1b	"Mighty Pups, Charged Up: Pups Save a Mighty Lighthouse"	David Rosenberg	March 27, 2020	May 2, 2020	701b	1.02
158a	2a	"Pups Save Election Day"	James Backshall	October 30, 2020	May 9, 2020	702a	0.53
158b	2b	"Pups Save the Bubble Monkeys"	Andy Guerdat and Steve Sullivan	October 30, 2020	May 9, 2020	702b	0.53
159a	3a	"Pups Save an Antarctic Martian"	Al Schwartz	May 8, 2020	May 16, 2020	703a	0.76
159b	3b	"Pups Save the Maze Explorers"	Louise Moon	May 8, 2020	May 16, 2020	703b	0.76
160	4	"Mighty Pups, Charged Up: Pups vs. Three Super Baddies"	Andy Guerdat and Steve Sullivan	April 17, 2020	May 23, 2020	704	0.84
Copycat has returned. He has given meteor fragment-laced objects to Harold Humdinger and Ladybird, but did not have one for Mayor Humdinger. The three villains work together to fight the Mighty Pups.
161a	5a	"Pups Save a Waiter Bot"	Robin J. Stein	June 5, 2020	May 30, 2020	705a	0.54
161b	5b	"Pups Stop a Pie-Clone"	Phillip Bastien	June 5, 2020	May 30, 2020	705b	0.54
162	6	"Dino Rescue: Pups and the Lost Dino Eggs"	Andy Guerdat and Steve Sullivan	June 26, 2020	June 13, 2020	706	0.97
Ryder introduces the PAW Patrol to their latest member Rex as one of his surprises. The next surprise takes the PAW Patrol through a cave in Jake's mountain where they end up in the Dino Wilds where dinosaurs still exist. It is here that they meet Cap'n Turbot's relatives Dr. Taylor Turbot and Tammy Turbot. Unbeknownst to the PAW Patrol, Mayor Humdinger has followed them into the Dino Wilds and starts stealing some dinosaur eggs to start his own dinosaur business in Adventure Bay. Now it's up to the PAW Patrol to rescue the eggs from Mayor Humdinger while dealing with the adult dinosaurs whose eggs that Mayor Humdinger stole from them.
163a	7a	"Dino Rescue: Pups Save a Pterodactyl"	Sean Jara	July 24, 2020	June 27, 2020	707a	0.65
The PAW Patrol is called to the Dino Wilds to rescue a daredevil Pteranodon named Maverick when he gets his wing pinned under a giant boulder.
163b	7b	"Dino Rescue: Pups and the Big Rumble"	David Rosenberg	August 7, 2020	June 27, 2020	707b	0.61
A volcano in the Dino Wilds is about the erupt. The PAW Patrol work to get the nearby dinosaurs to safety while avoiding the approaching lava.
164	8	"Dino Rescue: Pups Save a Hum-Dino"	Clark Stubbs	September 7, 2020	July 11, 2020	708	0.59
Mayor Humdinger plans to start his own dinosaur theme park after his Hum-Dino fails. When he gets to the Dino Wilds, he ends up on the back of a Brachiosaurus which runs out of control into Adventure Bay. It's up to the PAW Patrol to rescue Mayor Humdinger and get the Brachiosaurus back to the Dino Wilds.
165a	9a	"Dino Rescue: Pups Save a Sore Dino"	Al Schwartz	November 13, 2020	July 25, 2020	709a	0.48
The PAW Patrol are called to the Dino Wilds to deal with a rampaging Tyrannosaurus. They find that something is caught in its teeth and must find a way to get it out.
165b	9b	"Dino Rescue: Pups Save the Triceratops Tag-Alongs"	Robin J. Stein	November 13, 2020	July 25, 2020	709b	0.48
166a	10a	"Pups Save the Big Bad Bird Crew"	Andy Guerdat and Steve Sullivan	July 10, 2020	August 8, 2020	710a	0.56
166b	10b	"Pups Save a Soapbox Derby"	Sean Jara	July 10, 2020	August 8, 2020	710b	0.56
167a	11a	"Pups Save the Skydivers"	Robin J. Stein	August 21, 2020	August 22, 2020	711a	0.47
167b	11b	"Pups Save the Cupcakes"	Louise Moon	August 21, 2020	August 22, 2020	711b	0.47
168	12	"Ultimate Rescue: Pups Save the Pupmobiles"	Michael Stokes	October 9, 2020	September 5, 2020	712	0.63
Sid Swashbuckle and Arrby enlist some crabs to help them steal the Pupmobiles. Now Chase must lead the PAW Patrol in an Ultimate Police Rescue to reclaim the Pupmobiles and defeat Sid Swashbuckle.
169a	13a	"Pups Save a Lost Gold Miner"	David Rosenberg	October 16, 2020	September 19, 2020	713a	0.64
169b	13b	"Pups Save Uncle Otis from His Cabin"	Andy Guerdat and Steve Sullivan	October 16, 2020	September 19, 2020	713b	0.64
Mr. Wingnut provides upgrades to Otis Goodway's cabin. When it goes horribly awry to the point where it starts moving on its own, the PAW Patrol must rescue Otis and Mr. Wingnut before the cabin walks into a canyon.
170a	14a	"Pups Save a Rocket Roller Skater"	James Backshall	October 23, 2020	October 3, 2020	714a	0.45
170b	14b	"Pups Save Ryder's Surprise"	Andy Guerdat and Steve Sullivan	October 23, 2020	October 3, 2020	714b	0.45
171a	15a	"Pups Save the Marooned Mayors"	Robin J. Stein	December 11, 2020	October 24, 2020	715a	0.53
While in the arctic, Mayor Goodway and Mayor Humdinger end up chased into a chasm by the local wolves that were attracted to Mayor Humdinger's Hum-Burgers. It's up to the PAW Patrol to rescue them.
171b	15b	"Pups Save the Game Show"	Clark Stubbs	December 11, 2020	October 24, 2020	715b	0.53
A game show is being held at the Wingnut Ranch. One of its contestants is Mayor Humdinger who plans to cheat in the game show. The PAW Patrol is called in to make sure the game show stays honorable.
172a	16a	"Pups Save the Chalk Art"	Bryan Roy	November 6, 2020	November 7, 2020	716a	0.54
172b	16b	"Pups Save the Hot Potato"	David Rosenberg	November 6, 2020	November 7, 2020	716b	0.54
173	17	"Pups Save a Bah Humdinger"	Andy Guerdat and Steve Sullivan	November 20, 2020	December 5, 2020	717	0.42
174a	18a	"Pups Save Little Hairy"	Louise Moon	April 23, 2021	November 21, 2020	718a	0.33
Big Hairy's little brother Little Hairy has fallen into a pit and Big Hairy makes off with Tracker to help him. The PAW Patrol follows after them in order to get Tracker back and rescue Little Hairy.
174b	18b	"Pups Save a Kooky Climber"	Robin J. Stein	April 23, 2021	November 21, 2020	718b	0.33
175a	19a	"Pups Save Queen Cluck-Cluck"	Al Schwartz	March 12, 2021	December 19, 2020	719a	0.35
Mayor Goodway dreams about her and Cap'n Turbot arriving on an island of sentient chickens who claim that Chickaletta is the long-lost Queen Cluck-Cluck. The PAW Patrol are called in to get Chickaletta off the island.
175b	19b	"Pups Save a Desert Flounder"	Andy Guerdat and Steve Sullivan	March 12, 2021	December 19, 2020	719b	0.35
176	20	"Moto Pups: Pups vs. the Ruff-Ruff Pack"	Andy Guerdat and Steve Sullivan	January 15, 2021	January 16, 2021	720	0.62
Known motorcycle rider Wild is coming to Adventure Bay. Though he ends up delayed when his motorcycle is stolen by the Ruff-Ruff Pack. With help from Marshall, Wild meets up with the PAW Patrol who helps to reclaim Wild's motorcycle and deal with the Ruff-Ruff Pack.
177a	21a	"Pups Save a Trash-dinger"	Robin J. Stein	February 5, 2021	January 30, 2021	721a	0.34
177b	21b	"Pups Save the Royal Armor"	Sean Jara	February 5, 2021	January 30, 2021	721b	0.34
The Princess of Barkingburg and the Earl of Barkingburg are coming to Adventure Bay. Mayor Goodway plans to give a suit of armor to her as a gift. When the armor falls apart, Rubble and Rocky must use Rocky's Reuse-It Truck to put the armor back together before the Princess of Barkingburg arrives.
178a	22a	"Moto Pups: Pups Save the Donuts"	Clark Stubbs	February 19, 2021	February 13, 2021	722a	0.52
Mr. Porter is serving donuts with his donut-making machine. Unfortunately, it is stolen by the Ruff-Ruff Pack. It's up to the Moto Pups to rescue the donut-making machine from the Ruff-Ruff Pack.
178b	22b	"Moto Pups: Pups Save the Kitties"	Al Schwartz	February 19, 2021	February 13, 2021	722b	0.52
The Ruff-Ruff Pack find their way to Mayor Humdinger's lair and make off with the Kitten Catastrophe Crew. The PAW Patrol must help Mayor Humdinger rescue the Kitten Catastrophe Crew.
179	23	"Moto Pups: Pups Save a Moto Mayor"	Robin J. Stein	March 19, 2021	February 27, 2021	723	0.49
Tired of the Ruff-Ruff Pack's antics, Mayor Greatway plans to have them do good. She starts by posing as Mayor Badway in order to get into the Ruff-Ruff Pack and passes each of the initiation challenges. The Moto Pups are unaware of Mayor Goodway's plan until the Ruff-Ruff Pack's final challenge to her.
180a	24a	"Moto Pups: Rescue at Twisty Top Mesa"	Michael Stokes	April 16, 2021	March 13, 2021	724a	0.46
180b	24b	"Moto Pups: Pups Save a Sneezy Chase"	Andy Guerdat and Steve Sullivan	April 16, 2021	March 13, 2021	724b	0.46
After Wild learns that Chase has his cat allergies to him, the Moto Pups must rescue Chase and the Ruff-Ruff Pack stranding him in a desert as a gopher has stolen his pup tag.
181a	25a	"Ultimate Rescue: Pups Stop a Junk-Monster"	David Rosenberg	February 26, 2021	March 27, 2021	725a	0.32
181b	25b	"Pups Save the Whale Pod"	Sean Jara	February 26, 2021	March 27, 2021	725b	0.32
182a	26a	"Pups Save Thundermouth"	Michael Stokes	May 7, 2021	April 10, 2021 (TV); April 3, 2021 (Netflix)	726a	0.41
182b	26b	"Pups Save a Class Pet"	Clark Stubbs	May 7, 2021	April 10, 2021 (TV); April 3, 2021 (Netflix)	726b	0.41

=== Season 8 (2021–23) ===
No. overall	No. in season	Title	Written by	U.S. air date	Canadian air date	Prod. code	U.S. viewers (millions)
183a	1a	"Pups Save a Runaway Rooster"	Louise Moon	May 28, 2021	May 15, 2021	801a	0.41
183b	1b	"Pups Save a Snowbound Cow"	Andy Guerdat and Steve Sullivan	May 28, 2021	May 15, 2021	801b	0.41
184a	2a	"Pups Save a Sweet Mayor"	Robin J. Stein	April 2, 2021	May 29, 2021	802a	0.44
184b	2b	"Pups Save a Magic Trick"	Al Schwartz	April 2, 2021	May 29, 2021	802b	0.44
185a	3a	"Pups Save a Rubble-Double"	James Backshall	June 25, 2021	May 29, 2021	803a	0.47
185b	3b	"Pups Save a Clown"	Sean Jara	June 25, 2021	May 29, 2021	803b	0.47
Mayor Humdinger is jealous of a clown performing where he has failed clown school in the past. In an attempt to get control of a clown car, Mayor Humdinger sends the Kitten Catastrophe Crew inside as the clown car goes out of control causing Mayor Humdinger to enlist the PAW Patrol for help.
186	4	"Pups Stop the Cheetah"	Andy Guerdat and Steve Sullivan	September 10, 2021	June 12, 2021	804	0.50
The Cheetah has stolen the PAW Patroller and plans to build an exclusive race course in the jungle. Ryder creates a new and upgraded PAW Patroller that will help compete against the Cheetah's new Cheetah Patroller in order to thwart her plot.
187a	5a	"Pups Save the Mustache"	Clark Stubbs	July 30, 2021	June 19, 2021	805a	0.46
Mayor Humdinger is going to be photographed for a mustache magazine. When he accidentally shaves off his mustache while trimming it, he calls in the PAW Patrol to help save his mustache before the photographer arrives.
187b	5b	"Pups Save the Funhouse"	David Rosenberg	July 30, 2021	June 19, 2021	805b	0.46
188a	6a	"Sea Patrol: Pups Save a Water Walker"	Robin J. Stein	June 18, 2021	June 26, 2021	806a	0.44
188b	6b	"Sea Patrol: Pups Save a Windsurfer"	Michael Stokes	June 18, 2021	June 26, 2021	806b	0.44
189a	7a	"Pups Save the Hiding Elephants"	Louise Moon	October 15, 2021	July 3, 2021	807a	0.31
189b	7b	"Pups Save a Yodeler"	Andy Guerdat and Steve Sullivan	October 15, 2021	July 3, 2021	807b	0.31
190a	8a	"Pups Save the Dizzy Dust Express"	Michael Stokes	November 19, 2021	July 10, 2021	808a	0.28
190b	8b	"Pups Save the Treetop Trekkers"	James Backshall	November 19, 2021	July 10, 2021	808b	0.28
191a	9a	"Pups Save the Treasure Cruise"	Clark Stubbs	December 3, 2021	July 24, 2021	809a	0.39
Posing as a sea captain named Captain Humbearder, Mayor Humdinger hosts a treasure cruise to the Antarctic to find the Lost Treasure of Snowhere which Mayor Goodway, Otis Goodway, Mr. Porter, and Alex are partaking in. When Mayor Goodway successfully identifies Mayor Humdinger, his boat crashes into an iceberge causing the PAW Patrol to be called in to rescue them. Then some of the PAW Patrol had to go after Mayor Humdinger as he continues to look for the Lost Treasure of Snowhere.
191b	9b	"Pups Save Rocket Ryder"	Michael Stokes	December 3, 2021	July 24, 2021	809b	0.39
192a	10a	"Pups and Katie Stop the Barking Kitty Crew"	Andy Guerdat and Steve Sullivan	August 13, 2021	September 4, 2021	810a	0.55
While Ryder is out of town procuring a part for Robo-Dog, Katie covers for him in leading the PAW Patrol at the time when it comes to Mayor Humdinger and the Kitten Catastrophe Crew's latest plot.
192b	10b	"Pups Save the Glasses"	Bryan Roy	August 13, 2021	September 4, 2021	810b	0.55
193a	11a	"Pups vs. a Neon Humdinger"	Robin J. Stein	August 6, 2021	September 18, 2021	811a	0.50
193b	11b	"Pups Save a Royal Painting"	Louise Moon	August 6, 2021	September 18, 2021	811b	0.50
The Princess of Barkingburg is planning to unveil her royal painting detailing the ruler of Barkingburg. Though Sweetie plans to replace it with a painting of her own. It's up to the PAW Patrol to find the royal painting before the unveiling ceremony.
194a	12a	"Pups Save a Chicken Tulip"	Al Schwartz	February 11, 2022	October 2, 2021	812a	0.29
Mayor Goodway befriends Mayor Humdinger's mother Helga Humdinger as they go on a nature hike to find a flower called the chicken tulip. Mayor Humdinger plans to get the chicken tulip first. When things go wrong in nature, it's up to the PAW Patrol to rescue Mayor Goodway and Helga Humdinger and save the chicken tulip and Mayor Humdinger.
194b	12b	"Pups Stop an Xtreme Shark"	Sean Jara	February 11, 2022	October 2, 2021	812b	0.29
195a	13a	"Pups Save a Show Jumper"	Louise Moon	September 24, 2021	October 16, 2021	813a	0.25
195b	13b	"Pups Save the Salmon"	Phillip Bastien	September 24, 2021	October 16, 2021	813b	0.25
196a	14a	"Pups vs. Ouchy Paws"	Andy Guerdat	October 22, 2021	October 30, 2021	814a	0.36
196b	14b	"Pups Save a Glow-in-the-Dark Party"	James Backshall	October 22, 2021	October 30, 2021	814b	0.36
197	15	"Rescue Knights: Quest for the Dragon's Tooth"	Andy Guerdat	January 21, 2022	November 13, 2021	815	0.39
Ryder and the PAW Patrol are knighted by the Princess of Barkingburg as Marshall is instructed to guard the Dragon's Tooth that is needed to control a dragon. He loses it to an ex-knight named Claw as he uses it to control the dragon Sparks. While fortifying the Princess of Barkingburg's castle, Ryder and the PAW Patrol become Rescue Knights to combat Claw and Sparks.
198a	16a	"Pups Stop a Super Shaker"	Robin J. Stein	November 5, 2021	November 20, 2021	816a	0.28
198b	16b	"Pups Save a Flying Farmhouse"	Al Schwartz	November 5, 2021	November 20, 2021	816b	0.28
199a	17a	"Pups Save a Box Fort"	Sean Jara	May 20, 2022	November 27, 2021	817a	0.40
199b	17b	"Pups Save Travelin' Travis from Really Big Bill!"	Andy Guerdat and Steve Sullivan	May 20, 2022	November 27, 2021	817b	0.40
200	18	"Rescue Knights: Pups Save a Dozing Dragon"	Michael Stokes	April 8, 2022	December 4, 2021	818	0.35
In their plan to take over Barkingburg, Claw and the Duke of Flappington find a known cauldron that would unleash some fogs that put anyone to sleep. Though Sparks ends up getting exposed to the fog. Rubble and the Rescue Knights must find a way to stop the cauldron before everyone in Barkingburg is asleep. Note: As of this episode the team need to be rescued for Ryder:9 times, Chase:8 times, Zuma:4 times, Rocky:10 times, Marshall:16 times, Skye:5 times.
201a	19a	"Rescue Knights: Pups Save a Tournament"	Louise Moon	March 4, 2022	December 11, 2021	819a	0.31
The Princess of Barkingburg secretly enters a knight tournament wearing a special knight armor. The other competitors are Sweetie and Claw. With Claw planning to cheat in the tournament, the Rescue Knights must work to keep the tournament honorable.
201b	19b	"Rescue Knights: Pups Save the Baby Dragons"	Sean Jara	March 4, 2022	December 11, 2021	819b	0.31
Claw and Sparks kidnap some baby dragons as part of the Duke of Flappington's plot to take the throne of Barkingburg. The Rescue Knights must rescue the baby dragons from Claw and Sparks before their mother finds them.
202a	20a	"Rescue Knights: Pups Break the Ice"	Clark Stubbs	February 4, 2022	December 18, 2021	820a	0.41
Claw finds a way to make dragons breathe ice starting with Sparks. He uses this plan to freeze all of Barkingburg as Sweetie overhears their plans. Now the Rescue Knights must work to thwart Claw and thaw out Barkingburg with the help of the baby dragons.
202b	20b	"Rescue Knights: Pups Save Excalibark"	Robin J. Stein	February 4, 2022	December 18, 2021	820b	0.41
203a	21a	"Dancing with Luke Stars"	Jeffrey Duteil	April 15, 2022	February 19, 2022	821a	0.43
A dance contest is held that will have Luke Stars performing as Mayor Goodway has Mayor Humdinger as a dance partner. When the floating dance floor takes off into the sky, it's up to the PAW Patrol to rescue everyone and get the dance floor back on the ground.
203b	21b	"Pups Save a Mischievous Octopus"	Patrick Rieger	April 15, 2022	February 19, 2022	821b	0.43
204a	22a	"Pups Save the Kitties and the Kiddies"	Andy Guerdat and Steve Sullivan	May 13, 2022	February 26, 2022	822a	0.25
Mayor Humdinger befriends a woman named Cassie as he agrees to babysit Eddie and Emmy. When Eddie, Emmy and the Kitten Catastrophe Crew get stuck in a cave, Mayor Humdinger calls the PAW Patrol for help.
204b	22b	"Pups Save a Greenhouse"	Liam Farrell	May 13, 2022	February 26, 2022	822b	0.25
A greenhouse has been established in the arctic. When Mayor Goodway and Mayor Humdinger get trapped inside, the PAW Patrol must get in to rescue them.
205a	23a	"Pups Save the Floating Goodways"	Michael Stokes	June 3, 2022	March 5, 2022	823a	0.29
205b	23b	"Pups Save the Portable Pet Wash"	Clark Stubbs	June 3, 2022	March 5, 2022	823b	0.29
206a	24a	"Pups Save a Lonesome Walrus"	Andy Guerdat and Steve Sullivan	May 6, 2022	March 12, 2022	824a	0.25
206b	24b	"Pups Save the Hummy Gummies"	Al Schwartz	May 6, 2022	March 12, 2022	824b	0.25
207a	25a	"Cat Pack/PAW Patrol Rescue: Rubble and Wild and a Yarn Ball!"	Jeffrey Duteil	July 8, 2022; August 5, 2022 (full episode)	April 16, 2022 (TV); April 1, 2022 (Netflix)	113/825a	0.22
207b	25b	"Cat Pack/PAW Patrol Rescue: Skye and Rory Flip It"	Michael Stokes	July 15, 2022; August 5, 2022 (full episode)	April 23, 2022 (TV); April 1, 2022 (Netflix)	114/825b	0.22
207c	25c	"Cat Pack/PAW Patrol Rescue: Marshall, Leo and a Ferris Wheel"	Jeffrey Duteil	July 22, 2022; August 5, 2022 (full episode)	April 30, 2022 (TV); April 1, 2022 (Netflix)	115/825c	0.22
207d	25d	"Cat Pack/PAW Patrol Rescue: Everest, Shade and the Mountain Goat"	Louise Moon	July 29, 2022; August 5, 2022 (full episode)	May 6, 2022 (TV); April 1, 2022 (Netflix)	116/825d	0.22
208a	26a	"Pups Stop a Big Leak"	Andy Guerdat and Steve Sullivan	April 21, 2023	May 7, 2022 (TV); April 1, 2022 (Netflix)	117/826a	0.17
208b	26b	"Pups Save a Baby Anteater"	Robin J. Stein	April 21, 2023	May 7, 2022 (TV); April 1, 2022 (Netflix)	118/826b	0.17
208c	26c	"Pups Save a Hatch Day"	Sean Jara	April 21, 2023	May 7, 2022 (TV); April 1, 2022 (Netflix)	119/826c	0.17
208d	26d	"Pups Save the Munchie Mobile"	James Backshall	April 21, 2023	May 7, 2022 (TV); April 1, 2022 (Netflix)	120/826d	0.17

=== Season 9 (2022–23) ===
No. overall	No. in season	Title	Written by	U.S. air date	Canadian air date	Prod. code	U.S. viewers (millions)
209a	1a	"Liberty Makes a New Friend"	Andy Guerdat and Steve Sullivan	March 25, 2022	May 14, 2022	901a	0.41
Liberty visits from Adventure Bay where she meets everyone. She also befriends a black bear which ends up in Adventure Bay. When the black bear ends up on a log in the river, the PAW Patrol must rescue the black bear before it goes over the waterfall.
209b	1b	"Pups Save the Pup Pup Boogie Contest"	Robin J. Stein	March 25, 2022	May 14, 2022	901b	0.41
Liberty takes part in Adventure Bay's Pup Pup Boogie Contest. When it comes to the final parts, a strong wind causes Francoise's balloon to blow out of control wrecking stuff. While Rubble and Rocky work to fix the broken stuff, Ryder, Skye, and Liberty work to rescue Francoise when his balloon crashes in the mountains.
210	2	"Pups Meet the Cat Pack"	Michael Stokes	June 24, 2022 (Paramount+); November 25, 2022 (Nickelodeon)	May 28, 2022	902	0.30
Mayor Humdinger's Zap-O-Matic has enlarged Meow-Meow to tiger size as it starts to each everything that is metal. In order to combat Meow-Meow, Ryder and the PAW Patrol meet Wild's group known as the Cat Pack which consists of Leo, Rory, and Shade.
211a	3a	"Cat Pack/PAW Patrol Rescue: Rocket Rescuers"	Andy Guerdat and Steve Sullivan	June 24, 2022 (Paramount+); November 25, 2022 (Nickelodeon)	June 11, 2022	903a	0.30
During a carnival, some carnival rides go out of control causing the Mighty Pups and the Cat Pack to take action. One spinning ride that Mayor Goodway is on causes Mighty Chase and Wild to work on getting it back to the carnival.
211b	3b	"Cat Pack/PAW Patrol Rescue: The Golden Lion Mask"	Louise Moon	June 24, 2022 (Paramount+); November 25, 2022 (Nickelodeon)	June 11, 2022	903b	0.30
City Hall has just gotten a golden lion mask for its latest exhibit. Unfortunately, it ends up stolen by the Ruff-Ruff Pack. The PAW Patrol must reclaim the golden lion mask and defeat the Ruff-Ruff Pack.
212a	4a	"Cat Pack/PAW Patrol Rescue: The Cat That Roared"	Michael Stokes	June 24, 2022 (Paramount+); November 25, 2022 (Nickelodeon)	June 25, 2022	904a	0.30
212b	4b	"Cat Pack/PAW Patrol Rescue: Saving the Safe"	Michael Stokes	June 24, 2022 (Paramount+); November 25, 2022 (Nickelodeon)	June 25, 2022	904b	0.30
To get into the safe containing the Key to Adventure Bay, Mayor Humdinger uses his Zap-O-Matic on Meow-Meow again. This time as a precaution, he places a control collar on Meow-Meow. Things go wrong during the heist when the control collar accidentally comes off and Mayor Humdinger gets stuck in the safe. It's up to the PAW Patrol to save the Key to Adventure City and get control of Meow-Meow.
213a	5a	"Pups Save a Humdinger Doll"	Sean Jara	September 23, 2022	July 9, 2022	905a	0.23
Big Hairy has lost his doll. In need of a substitute, he abducts Mayor Humdinger. The Kitten Catastrophe Crew call in the PAW Patrol to rescue Mayor Humdinger and find Big Hairy's doll.
213b	5b	"Pups Save a Sand Sculpture Contest"	Allen Markuze	September 23, 2022	July 9, 2022	905b	0.23
214	6	"Big Truck Pups: Pups Stop a Flood"	Andy Guerdat and Steve Sullivan	September 9, 2022	July 23, 2022	906	0.21
The PAW Patrol meet Ryder's truck driver friend Al who helps the PAW Patrol out when it comes to a rainstorm. With their big trucks, the PAW Patrol become the Big Truck Pups in order to get the nearby dam into good shape before it floods Adventure Bay.
215a	7a	"Pups Save the Tooth Fairy"	Sean Jara	November 4, 2022	August 6, 2022	907a	0.26
215b	7b	"Pups Solve the Mystery of the Missing Art"	Jeffrey Duteil	November 4, 2022	August 6, 2022	907b	0.26
An art contest is in Adventure Bay as paintings go missing. Mayor Goodway doesn't know it, but Mayor Humdinger is behind the missing art while posing as a clown so that Eddie and Emmy's painting would be the only one left. The PAW Patrol are called in to find the missing paintings.
216a	8a	"Pups Save the Hatchlings"	Robin J. Stein	April 7, 2023	August 13, 2022	908a	0.23
216b	8b	"Pups Save a Wrongway Farmhand"	Andy Guerdat and Steve Sullivan	April 7, 2023	August 13, 2022	908b	0.23
217	9	"Big Truck Pups: Pups Save the Bridge"	Sean Jara	November 21, 2022	August 20, 2022	909	0.26
218a	10a	"Big Truck Pups: Pups Save a Sliding Chalet"	Clark Stubbs	October 28, 2022	August 27, 2022	910a	0.27
While Jake is out of town, Mayor Humdinger and the Kitten Catastrophe Crew sneak into Jake's chalet. When it starts to slide down the mountain, Ms. Marjorie calls in the Big Truck Pups to save Jake's chalet and get it back to its position.
218b	10b	"Big Truck Pups: Pups Save a Really Big Dish"	Al Schwartz	October 28, 2022	August 27, 2022	910b	0.27
219a	11a	"Big Truck Pups: Pups Save the Swiped Speakers"	Jeffrey Duteil	October 7, 2022	September 3, 2022	911a	0.32
Luke Stars is going to be performing in Adventure Bay as Al transports the speakers needed for the concert. Displeased that he couldn't get a ticket for the concert, Mayor Humdinger poses as a road crew member named Mayonnaise to swipe them which doesn't go according to plan.
219b	11b	"Big Truck Pups: Pups Save the Big Big Pipes"	Louise Moon	October 7, 2022	September 3, 2022	911b	0.32
220a	12a	"Pups Stop the Return of Humsquatch"	Clark Stubbs	October 21, 2022	September 10, 2022	912a	0.21
While at the carnival with Mayor Humdinger and their mother Cassie, Eddie and Emmy swipe Mayor Humdinger's Humsquatch costume to scare off the attendees. Cassie calls in the PAW Patrol to deal with the Humsquatch and find her kids. Things get more complicated when the actual Humsquatch shows up.
220b	12b	"Pups Save a Lonely Ghost"	Michael Stokes	October 21, 2022	September 10, 2022	912b	0.21
221a	13a	"Mighty Pups, Super Paws: Pups Stop a Mighty Eel"	Michael Stokes	December 26, 2022	September 17, 2022	913a	0.18
A giant eel has appeared in Adventure Bay causing the Mighty Pups to take action. When Mayor Goodway and Chickaletta are swallowed, they find that the eel got big because it swallowed a meteor fragment and become Mighty Eel.
221b	13b	"Mission PAW: Pups Save a Floating Royal Carriage"	Robin J. Stein	December 27, 2022	September 17, 2022	913b	0.21
Sweetie sneaks into the royal carriage in an attempt to make off with it. Things get complicated when Sid Swashbuckle sends Arrby to steal the royal carriage for him. The PAW Patrol are called in by the Earl of Barkingburg to retrieve the royal carriage.
222	14	"Aqua Pups: Pups Save a Floating Castle"	Andy Guerdat and Steve Sullivan	January 6, 2023	November 12, 2022	914	0.23
Cap'n Turbot, Ryder, and the pups invited to Puplantis for the mer-pup celebration of the mer-moon where they meet a speaking mer-pup named Coral, who is look alike with Skye and reveals that they're long-lost cousins. After being paw-bumped and gaining a land-pup form, a grouchy mer-pup inventor named Moby gains the power of speech and tries to float Puplantis to the surface with help from his squid pal McSquidly. It's up to the PAW Patrol and Coral to save the underwater city with their new vehicles and the PAW Patroller's second form known as the Whale Patroller as they become the Aqua Pups.
223a	15a	"Dino Rescue: Pups Save a T-Rex Tyke"	Al Schwartz	December 28, 2022	November 26, 2022	915a	0.24
223b	15b	"Pups Save a Playful Elephant Calf"	Michael Stokes	December 29, 2022	November 26, 2022	915b	0.24
224	16	"All Paws on Deck"	Louise Moon	April 24, 2023	December 10, 2022	916	0.18
A child inventor named Codi Gizmody has come to Adventure Bay with her robot Elly-Dee. After getting a tour of Adventure Bay from her flying car, Codi wants to buy the whole town only for Mayor Goodway to turn down her suggestion. Disliking being turned down, Codi starts her plans to turn Adventure Bay into Codi Cove by unleashing the Relocator invention on Adventure Bay as it sends Mr. Porter's café to different locations. Upon Codi using the Relocator on Ryder and the pups before they can take action, as well as placing guard drones around the Lookout, the Relocator sends each of the locations to different parts of the world as larger drones start snatching everyone in Adventure Bay and sending the demolition drones to destroy all old items. As Codi plans to send everyone to the Moon, Ryder and the original 6 pups (Marshall, Rubble, Chase, Rocky, Zuma, and Skye) enlist Everest, Tracker, the Mighty Twins, Rex, the Cat Pack, Liberty, Al, and Coral, as well as Sweetie and Arrby to thwart Codi's plot upon getting control of the Relocator so that they can thwart Codi and her robots.
225a	17a	"Pups Save Katie and Some Kitties"	Andy Guerdat and Steve Sullivan	February 17, 2023	December 24, 2022	917a	0.24
225b	17b	"Pups Save a Helo Humdinger"	Michael Stokes	February 17, 2023	December 24, 2022	917b	0.24
226	18	"Aqua Pups: Pups Save a Mer-Race"	Sean Jara	January 20, 2023	December 25, 2022	918	0.25
Mayor Goodway and Cap'n Turbot join Skye, Coral, and the mer-pups in Puplantis' very first Friendship Mer-Race. As Coral gets nervous, Skye gives her some pieces of advice to breathe and have fun. Also in the race are Moby and McSquidly as he plans to cheat in the race so that he can win the prize of having whatever is decreed for the rest of the day. Ryder and the pups bring the other racers from Moby's traps, leaving Coral to stop Moby and McSquidly from winning the race.
227a	19a	"Aqua Pups: Pups Save a Merdinger"	Jeffrey Duteil	January 13, 2023	January 21, 2023	919a	0.22
227b	19b	"Aqua Pups: Pups Save the Whale Patroller"	Robin J. Stein	January 13, 2023	January 21, 2023	919b	0.22
228a	20a	"Aqua Pups: Pups Save the Reef"	Clark Stubbs	January 23, 2023	February 4, 2023	920a	0.23
228b	20b	"Aqua Pups: Pups Stop a Giant Squid"	Michael Stokes	January 23, 2023	February 4, 2023	920b	0.23
229a	21a	"Pups Save a Flamingo Dancer"	Louise Moon	April 14, 2023	February 18, 2023	921a	0.19
229b	21b	"Pups Save a Mayor and Her Mini"	Andy Guerdat and Steve Sullivan	April 14, 2023	February 18, 2023	921b	0.19
230a	22a	"Pups Save the Wind Trekkers"	Michael Stokes	February 3, 2023	March 4, 2023	922a	0.25
230b	22b	"Pups Save a Trophy"	Al Schwartz	February 3, 2023	March 4, 2023	922b	0.25
231a	23a	"Pups Save Alex's Feathery Friends"	Clark Stubbs	February 10, 2023	March 18, 2023	923a	0.20
231b	23b	"Pups Save a Puffy Mayor"	Sean Jara	February 10, 2023	March 18, 2023	923b	0.20
232a	24a	"Pups Save a Jukebox"	Louise Moon	February 24, 2023	April 8, 2023	924a	0.22
Rubble and Rocky refurbish a jukebox that they found on Junk Island where it was upgraded with wheels. After Mr. Porter's pup treat delivery, Rocky allows him to have it for his café as Mayor Goodway, Otis Goodway, and Ms. Marjorie donate their favorite records to fill the jukebox like their jazz music. Displeased with the music that was jazz music playing, Mayor Humdinger hears about it and sneaks into the "Kitty Kitty Meow-Meow" song in the jukebox which annoys everyone. When Mr. Porter stops the song, Mayor Humdinger has the Kitten Catastrophe Crew commit a diversion so that he can steal the jukebox and play "Kitty Kitty Meow Meow" to Foggy Bottom all day long. Now Ryder must lead Chase and Rubble (who wears his DJ gear) to reclaim the jukebox while the others retrieve the flying records that Mayor Humdinger drops the music discs in the jukebox and switch the music.
232b	24b	"Pups Save a Mayor on a Wire"	Robin J. Stein	February 24, 2023	April 8, 2023	924b	0.22
233a	25a	"Pups Save the Baby Space Rocks"	Philip Bastien	March 6, 2023	April 15, 2023	925a	0.27
233b	25b	"Pups Save the Eddies and Emmys"	Jeffrey Duteil	March 6, 2023	April 15, 2023	925b	0.27
Mayor Goodway unveils a new 3-D Printer for everyone to use. As Cassie relaxes on the beach, Eddie and Emmy misuse the 3-D Printer to make copies of themselves and play pranks on everyone including the PAW Patrol. When the reals Eddie and Emmy get trapped inside the 3-D Printer when it is moved to another location, it's up to the PAW Patrol to rescue them.
234a	26a	"Charger Visits the Pups"	Michael Stokes	July 31, 2023	April 22, 2023	926a	N/A
Rubble's cousin Charger comes to Adventure Bay to visit Rubble. He soon gets involved with the PAW Patrol when Mayor Humdinger accidentally causes a water burst that ends up wrecking Mr. Porter's café.
234b	26b	"Pups Save a Shiny Ride"	Nabeel Arshad	July 31, 2023	April 22, 2023	926b	N/A

=== Season 10 (2023–24) ===
No. overall	No. in season	Title	Written by	U.S. air date	Canadian air date	Prod. code	U.S. viewers (millions)
235a	1a	"Pups Save the Wacky Water Skiers"	Al Schwartz	July 10, 2023	May 27, 2023	1001a	0.20
235b	1b	"Pups Save the Mayor's Assistant"	Clark Stubbs	July 10, 2023	May 27, 2023	1001b	0.20
236a	2a	"Pups Save a High-Flying Hen"	Robin J. Stein	July 24, 2023	June 10, 2023	1002a	N/A
236b	2b	"Pups Save a Sloth"	Louise Moon	July 24, 2023	June 10, 2023	1002b	N/A
237	3	"Jungle Pups: Pups Find a Hidden Jungle"	Andy Guerdat and Steve Sullivan	January 8, 2024	June 24, 2023	1003	0.26
While driving in a jungle, Tracker finds a secret cave near a lagoon that is filled with cave paintings. Upon further exploring, he slides down a tunnel and finds himself in the Hidden Jungle and ends up in danger when trying to rescue a monkey. The Paw Patrol is called in by Carlos to help find Tracker as they use their new animal-themed vehicles to gain the trust of the local tigers, elephants, falcons, snapping turtles, Sumatran rhinoceroses, and alligators. Once that is done, the Paw Patrol must keep the animals safe from an erupting volcano as Tracker gets his monkey-themed vehicle.
238a	4a	"Pups Save a Windswept Polar Bear Cub"	Michael Stokes	January 15, 2024	July 5, 2023 (TVOKids website); July 8, 2023 (TV)	1004a	0.15
238b	4b	"Pups Save a Drive-In"	Sean Jara	January 16, 2024	July 8, 2023	1004b	0.12
239a	5a	"Pups Save Their Digi Tal Friends"	Andy Guerdat and Steve Sullivan	July 17, 2023	July 22, 2023	1005a	0.17
239b	5b	"Pups Save the Rainbow"	Jeffrey Duteil	July 17, 2023	July 22, 2023	1005b	0.17
Mayor Humdinger dreams that he has found a rainbow stone as he starts to drain all the color out of Adventure Bay. This causes the PAW Patrol to find a way to get Adventure Bay's color back while defeating Mayor Humdinger that he wake ups.
240	6	"Jungle Pups: Pups Save the Big, Big Animals"	Louise Moon	January 9, 2024	August 5, 2023	1006	0.15
241a	7a	"Jungle Pups: Pups Save the Meerkat Pirates"	Clark Stubbs	January 10, 2024	August 12, 2023	1007a	N/A
241b	7b	"Jungle Pups: Pups Save a Hum-Hippo"	Robin J. Stein	January 10, 2024	August 12, 2023	1007b	N/A
242a	8a	"Jungle Pups: Pups Save a Golden Sweetie"	Louise Moon	January 11, 2024	August 19, 2023	1008a	0.15
242b	8b	"Jungle Pups: Pups Save the Giant Ants"	Sean Jara	January 11, 2024	August 19, 2023	1008b	0.15
243a	9a	"Pups Stop a Gold Finding Machine"	Michael Stokes	October 31, 2023	August 26, 2023	1009a	0.15
243b	9b	"Pups Help Mayor Humdinger Out of a Jam"	Al Schwartz	November 1, 2023	August 26, 2023	1009b	0.20
244a	10a	"Liberty's Mountain Rescue"	Scott Gray	November 2, 2023	September 2, 2023	1010a	0.20
244b	10b	"Pups Save a Flying Farmer Yumi"	David Rosenberg	November 2, 2023	September 2, 2023	1010b	0.20
245a	11a	"Pups Stop the Falling Space Junk"	Andy Guerdat and Steve Sullivan	November 8, 2023	September 9, 2023	1011a	0.12
245b	11b	"Pups Stop the Giant Cuckoo"	Jeffrey Duteil	November 9, 2023	September 9, 2023	1011b	0.18
246a	12a	"Pups Save a Hum-ñata"	Robin J. Stein	November 15, 2023	October 28, 2023	1012a	0.12
246b	12b	"Pups Stop the Foggy Skies"	Mark Purdy	November 16, 2023	October 28, 2023	1012b	0.12
247	13	"Mighty Pups vs. The Mayor of the Universe"	Sean Jara	October 30, 2023	November 11, 2023	1013	0.15
The Mighty Pups and the Junior Patrollers must stop Harold and Mayor Humdinger's giant flying top hat from thwarting Adventure Bay.
248a	14a	"Charger's Christmas Adventure"	Michael Stokes	November 27, 2023	November 25, 2023	1014a	0.26
248b	14b	"Pups Save Great Uncle Smiley's Cup"	Andy Guerdat and Steve Sullivan	November 28, 2023	November 25, 2023	1014b	0.12
249a	15a	"Pups Save a Baby Caribou"	Amir Agoora	January 13, 2024 (Nick Jr.); January 17, 2024 (Nickelodeon)	December 9, 2023	1015a	N/A
249b	15b	"Pups Save Luke and His Luke-Alike"	Louise Moon	January 13, 2024 (Nick Jr.); January 18, 2024 (Nickelodeon)	December 9, 2023	1015b	0.12
250a	16a	"Mighty Pups vs. The Big Chill"	Robin J. Stein	November 6, 2023	December 23, 2023	1016a	0.13
250b	16b	"Mighty Pups vs. The Mighty Cheetah"	Mario López-Cordero	November 7, 2023	December 23, 2023	1016b	0.19
The Cheetah gets her super speed after she steals the half of Chase's crystal, which causing his powers to malfunction. The Mighty Pups help Chase to restore his crystal from the Cheetah.
251a	17a	"Mighty Pups Stop the Mighty Queen"	Miden Wood	November 13, 2023	February 17, 2024	1017a	0.14
251b	17b	"Mighty Pups Stop the Hiccups"	Morgan von Ancken	November 14, 2023	February 17, 2024	1017b	0.17
252a	18a	"Pups Save a Disappearing Flounder"	Phillip Bastien	January 22, 2024	March 2, 2024	1018a	0.18
Cap'n Turbot was planning on studying the Adventure Bay triangle, but the next morning, his flounder is gone with only a piece remaining. He calls the PAW Patrol to find his flounder, getting Zuma and Rocky to do the job. Venturing into the triangle, it was clued that the flounder sunk underwater. It was discovered that slugs had been playing around with the flounder and the ships that sunk as toys. Zuma gives the slugs lifesavers to play with, and with the mother satisfied, Zuma, with help from Skye using cushions and Rocky giving them air, get the flounder back above sea level.
252b	18b	"Pups Save Little Grandpa and Mr. Alex"	Jeff Sager	January 23, 2024	March 2, 2024	1018b	0.12
It's trading places day, so Mr. Porter and Alex decided to swap roles for the day. Alex runs the cafe as "Mr. Alex", while Mr. Porter checks on the Mini Patrol as "Little Grandpa". Communicating with the Mini Patrol, Mr. Porter unintentionally freaks them out and they runaway. Trying to stop them, Mr. Porter rides on the slide of the treehouse, accidentally breaking it and gets stuck. As Porter calls the PAW Patrol about the situation to get help, Ryder summons Skye to find the Mini Patrollers, and Rocky to save Mr. Porter and fix the slide. With Mr. Porter saved and Skye finding the Mini Patrollers with the backup of Chase, Alex is making Mr. Porter's no cook pudding. He adds Yeast to the recipe, which makes it grow in size. As the pudding continues growing, Alex gets worried, and makes a mess in the cafe, though Rocky does clean-up the mess with his vacuum. Now that the cafe is cleaned, all of the Mini Patrollers are found.
253a	19a	"Pups Save the Elephant Spa"	Michael Stokes	January 24, 2024	March 16, 2024	1019a	0.16
253b	19b	"Pups Save an Underwater Otis"	Andy Guerdat and Steve Sullivan	January 25, 2024	March 16, 2024	1019b	0.12
254a	20a	"Pups vs. the Hum-Flectors"	Robin J. Stein	May 8, 2024	March 30, 2024	1020a	0.07
254b	20b	"Pups Save a Capybara"	Louise Moon	May 8, 2024	March 30, 2024	1020b	0.07
255a	21a	"Cat Pack: Pups & Cats Save HumCatDingerMan"	Michael Stokes	April 8, 2024	April 13, 2024	1021a	0.12
255b	21b	"Pups Save a Turbot Tournament"	Sean Jara	April 8, 2024	April 13, 2024	1021b	0.12
256a	22a	"Pups Save a Talkative Mini Patrol"	Jeffrey Duteil	May 14, 2024	April 27, 2024	1022a	0.06
256b	22b	"Pups Save the History of Adventure Bay"	Bryan Roy	May 15, 2024	April 27, 2024	1022b	0.12
257	23	"Rescue Wheels: Pups Save Adventure Bay!"	Jeffrey Duteil	September 16, 2024	May 11, 2024	1023	N/A
258a	24a	"Pups Save a Runaway Robo-Chicken Purse"	Michael Stokes	May 6, 2024	May 25, 2024	1024a	0.06
258b	24b	"Pups Save the Buggy Trekkers"	Al Schwartz	May 6, 2024	May 25, 2024	1024b	0.06
259a	25a	"Pups Take in a Runaway Kitty!"	Andy Guerdat and Steve Sullivan	May 13, 2024	June 8, 2024	1025a	N/A
259b	25b	"Pups Save the Cheese Goat!"	Katiedid Langrock	May 13, 2024	June 8, 2024	1025b	N/A
260	26	"Rescue Wheels: Pups vs. the Monster Mayor"	Robin J. Stein	September 17, 2024	June 15, 2024	1026	N/A

=== Season 11 (2024–25) ===
No. overall	No. in season	Title	Written by	U.S. air date	Canadian air date	Prod. code	U.S. viewers (millions)
261a	1a	"Rescue Wheels: Pups Save the Teetering Tower"	Peri Segel	September 18, 2024	July 6, 2024	1101a	N/A
261b	1b	"Rescue Wheels: Pups Save the Spelunkers"	Louise Moon	September 18, 2024	July 6, 2024	1101b	N/A
262a	2a	"Rescue Wheels: Pups Save the Risky Race"	Crystal Villarreal	September 19, 2024	July 13, 2024	1102a	N/A
262b	2b	"Rescue Wheels: Pups Save the Runaway Truck"	Joey Clift	September 19, 2024	July 13, 2024	1102b	N/A
263a	3a	"Pups Plus a Plucky Chicken"	Robin J. Stein	September 25, 2024	July 20, 2024	1103a	N/A
263b	3b	"Pups Save a Pet Show"	Amanda McNeice	September 26, 2024	July 20, 2024	1103b	N/A
264a	4a	"Pups Save Helga & the Humsquatch"	Crystal Villarreal	September 30, 2024	July 27, 2024	1104a	N/A
264b	4b	"Pups Save the Missing Bone-Stone"	JP Meier	October 1, 2024	July 27, 2024	1104b	N/A
265a	5a	"Pups Save the Director"	Peri Segel	October 2, 2024	August 3, 2024	1105a	N/A
265b	5b	"Pups Save the Super Cows"	Louise Moon	October 3, 2024	August 3, 2024	1105b	N/A
266	6	"Air Rescue: Pups Save the Airport Opening"	Louise Moon	February 17, 2025	August 10, 2024	1106	N/A
267a	7a	"Pups Save the Mountain Surfers"	Mark Purdy	November 4, 2024	August 17, 2024	1107a	N/A
267b	7b	"Pups Save Humdinger's Home Away from Home"	Renae J. Ruddock	November 5, 2024	August 17, 2024	1107b	N/A
268a	8a	"Pups Get Your Goat"	David Rosenberg	September 23, 2024	August 24, 2024 (Knowledge Kids website)	1108a	N/A
268b	8b	"Pups Save the Crop Circles"	Mario López-Cordero	September 24, 2024	August 24, 2024 (Knowledge Kids website)	1108b	N/A
269	9	"Air Rescue: Pups Save a Hum-stronaut"	Peri Segel	February 24, 2025	September 28, 2024	1109	N/A
270a	10a	"Air Rescue: Pups Stop a Rocket-Powered Pogo Stick"	Senibo Myers	February 18, 2025	October 5, 2024	1110a	N/A
270b	10b	"Air Rescue: Pups Save the Sky-High Stunt Show"	JP Meier	February 19, 2025	October 5, 2024	1110b	N/A
271a	11a	"Air Rescue: Pups vs. the Hum-Cloud"	Peri Segel	February 20, 2025	October 12, 2024	1111a	N/A
271b	11b	"Air Rescue: Pups Stop the Mid-Air Magnet"	Senibo Myers	February 25, 2025	October 12, 2024	1111b	N/A
272a	12a	"Pups Save the Baddies"	Jeff Sager	November 6, 2024	October 19, 2024	1112a	N/A
272b	12b	"Pups Save the Yumi Bee"	Jennifer White	November 7, 2024	October 19, 2024	1112b	N/A
273a	13a	"Pups Save the Big Book Delivery"	Peri Segel	December 3, 2024	October 26, 2024	1113a	N/A
273b	13b	"Pups Save the Puppets"	Amanda McNeice	December 4, 2024	October 26, 2024	1113b	N/A
274	14	"A Jr. Patrollers' Christmas"	Louise Moon	December 2, 2024	November 30, 2024 (Knowledge Kids website); December 7, 2024 (TV)	1114	N/A
275a	15a	"Pups vs. The Robo-Ducky"	Jen Bardekoff	December 5, 2024	January 4, 2025	1115a	N/A
275b	15b	"Pups Save the Lost Penguin"	Amanda McNeice	December 6, 2024	January 4, 2025	1115b	N/A
276a	16a	"Pups Save the Chicken Conductor!"	Caitlin Hodson	December 13, 2024	January 11, 2025	1116a	N/A
276b	16b	"Pups Save the Digi-Tal Stylists"	Mario López-Cordero	December 16, 2024	January 11, 2025	1116b	N/A
277a	17a	"Pups Save Fogstock"	Joey Clift	December 17, 2024	January 18, 2025	1117a	N/A
277b	17b	"Pups Save the Stage Actor"	Amanda McNeice	December 18, 2024	January 18, 2025	1117b	N/A
278	18	"Fire Rescue: Pups Save the Big BBQ"	Amanda McNeice	June 2, 2025	January 25, 2025	1118	N/A
279a	19a	"Hum-Patrol to the Rescue"	Jeffrey Duteil	December 23, 2024	February 1, 2025	1119a	N/A
279b	19b	"Pups Save Morning Mountain Yoga"	JP Meier	December 24, 2024	February 1, 2025	1119b	N/A
280a	20a	"Pups and the Power of Flowers"	Melinda LaRose	February 26, 2025	April 12, 2025	1120a	N/A
280b	20b	"Pups Save the Alien Egg Hunt"	Sheila Rogerson	February 28, 2025 (Amazon and On Demand); March 31, 2025 (TV)	April 12, 2025	1120b	N/A
281	21	"Fire Rescue: Pups Save Lizzy's Lemonade Blaze"	Louise Moon	June 3, 2025	March 29, 2025	1121	N/A
282a	22a	"Fire Rescue: Pups Save the Flaming Flounder"	Max Beaudry	August 15, 2025	April 5, 2025	1122a	N/A
282b	22b	"Fire Rescue: Pups Make the News"	Senibo Myers	August 15, 2025	April 5, 2025	1122b	N/A
283a	23a	"Fire Rescue: Pups Save a Baby Goat Birthday"	Lisa Kettle	June 4, 2025	April 12, 2025	1123a	N/A
283b	23b	"Fire Rescue: Pups Save a S'more-mergency"	Peri Segel	June 5, 2025	April 12, 2025	1123b	N/A
284a	24a	"Pups Save Captain Crinkle-cut"	Robin J. Stein	July 25, 2025	April 26, 2025	1124a	N/A
284b	24b	"Pups Save the Big Nightlight"	Mark Purdy	July 25, 2025	April 26, 2025	1124b	N/A
285	25	"Skye's Road Trip Rescue"	Robin J. Stein	July 11, 2025	May 3, 2025	1125	N/A
Skye, Everest, and Liberty depart from Adventure Bay to Yellowbone National Park while having their girl pup road trip. After learning about the baby deer, bunny and bear are separated by their parents while playing near the river, the three pups use their new mini-vehicles and must rescue them with the help of Ryder's friend and park ranger Aspen.
286a	26a	"Pups Save the Space Kitty"	Scott Gray	August 1, 2025	May 10, 2025	1126a	N/A
286b	26b	"Pups Save the Sea Sponges"	Jeff Sager	August 1, 2025	May 10, 2025	1126b	N/A

=== Season 12 (2025–26) ===
No. overall	No. in season	Title	Written by	U.S. air date	Canadian air date	Prod. code	U.S. viewers (millions)
287a	1a	"Pups Save a Pop Star"	Hugh Duffy	July 18, 2025	August 2, 2025	1201a	N/A
Skye, Liberty, Everest and Aspen go to Sierra Sparkle's Concert
287b	1b	"Pups Save the Meditation Dome"	Pam Sawhney	July 18, 2025	August 2, 2025	1201b	N/A
288	2	"Search & Rescue: Pups Save the Bike Race"	Amanda McNeice	February 23, 2026	August 16, 2025	1202	N/A
Note: When this episode aired on Milkshake! in the UK, there is an error as the opening theme song is missing.
289a	3a	"Pups Stop a Coconut Catapult"	Michael Stokes	August 8, 2025	August 30, 2025	1203a	N/A
289b	3b	"Pups Save Humdinger's Goose!"	Veronica Pickett	August 8, 2025	August 30, 2025	1203b	N/A
290a	4a	"Pups Save Hummy Mummy’s New Home"	Max Beaudry	December 8, 2025	September 13, 2025	1204a	N/A
290b	4b	"Pups Save Adventure Bakes"	Mario López-Cordero	December 10, 2025	September 13, 2025	1204b	N/A
291	5	"Search & Rescue: Pups Save a Snack Snatcher"	Louise Moon	February 24, 2026	September 27, 2025	1205	TBA
292a	6a	"Search & Rescue: Pups Save a Swept-Away Sweetheart"	Angela M. Sánchez	February 25, 2026	October 11, 2025	1206a	N/A
292b	6b	"Search & Rescue: the Mystery of the Missing Kitties"	Mario López-Cordero	February 25, 2026	October 11, 2025	1206b	N/A
293a	7a	"Search and Rescue: Pups Help the Chickens Cross the Road"	Senibo Myers	February 26, 2026	October 18, 2025	1207a	N/A
293b	7b	"Search and Rescue: Pups Save a Lost Ryder"	Ellie Guzman	February 26, 2026	October 18, 2025	1207b	N/A
294a	8a	"Pups Stop a Topiary Tal"	Lisa Kettle	December 15, 2025	November 1, 2025	1208a	N/A
294b	8b	"Pups Save a Hum-Ball"	Michael Stokes	December 17, 2025	November 1, 2025	1208b	N/A
295a	9a	"Pups Save a Haunted Farm"	Melinda LaRose	October 17, 2025	September 30, 2025 (TVOKids Paw Patrol Channel); October 25, 2025 (TV)	1209a	N/A
295b	9b	"Pups Save the Adventure Bay Boogie"	Senibo Myers	October 24, 2025	September 30, 2025 (TVOKids Paw Patrol Channel); October 25, 2025 (TV)	1209b	N/A
296a	10a	"Pups Save a Big Brother"	Amanda McNeice	December 19, 2025	November 8, 2025	1210a	N/A
296b	10b	"Pups Save a Giant Baby"	Louise Moon	December 22, 2025	November 8, 2025	1210b	N/A
297a	11a	"Pups Save the Goldfish"	Mark Purdy	March 2, 2026	November 15, 2025	1211a	N/A
297b	11b	"Pups Save a Flying Florist"	Robin J. Stein	March 3, 2026	November 15, 2025	1211b	N/A
298a	12a	"Katie's Arctic Road Trip"	Michael Stokes	December 2, 2025	November 22, 2025	1212a	N/A
298b	12b	"Pups Save a Magical Mishap"	Angela M. Sánchez	December 4, 2025	November 22, 2025	1212b	N/A
299a	13a	"Pups Save the Hum-Sprayer"	Robin J. Stein	March 2, 2026 (Nick Jr. Channel); March 4, 2026 (Nickelodeon)	November 29, 2025	1213a	N/A
299b	13b	"Pups Save the Hot Springs"	Maxwell Nicoll	March 2, 2026 (Nick Jr. Channel); March 5, 2026 (Nickelodeon)	November 29, 2025	1213b	N/A

=== Season 13 (2026) ===
No. overall	No. in season	Title	Written by	U.S. air date	Canadian air date	Prod. code	U.S. viewers (millions)
300a	1a	"Pups Solve a Snap-N-Wrap Problem"	Stuart Friedel	March 9, 2026	January 31, 2026	1301a	N/A
300b	1b	"Pups Save Helga and the Dingers"	Ashley Griffis	March 10, 2026	January 31, 2026	1301b	N/A
301a	2a	"Pups Save the Orienteers"	Eva Konstantopoulos	March 7, 2026 (Nick Jr. Channel); March 11, 2026 (Nickelodeon)	February 6, 2026 (TVOKids website); February 14, 2026 (TV)	1302a	N/A
301b	2b	"Pups Save Teatime"	Veronica Pickett	March 7, 2026 (Nick Jr. Channel); March 12, 2026 (Nickelodeon)	February 6, 2026 (TVOKids website); February 14, 2026 (TV)	1302b	N/A
302a	3a	"Pups and the Alien Grandpa"	Jeff Sager	June 5, 2026	February 6, 2026 (TVOKids website); February 21, 2026 (TV)	1303a	N/A
302b	3b	"Pups Save a Lemon-Loving Duckling"	Eric Steinhart	June 5, 2026	February 6, 2026 (TVOKids website); February 21, 2026 (TV)	1303b	N/A
303a	4a	"Pups Save a Hum-Kicker"	Carolyn Hay	June 12, 2026	February 6, 2026 (TVOKids website); February 26, 2026 (TV)	1304a	N/A
303b	4b	"Pups Save the One-Man Band"	Senibo Myers	June 12, 2026	February 6, 2026 (TVOKids website); February 26, 2026 (TV)	1304b	N/A
304	5	"Pups Save the Dino Chicken"	Amanda McNeice	September 25, 2026	September 3, 2026 (TVOKids website) (Note: First released on April 1, 2026, before it was removed the following day.); September 5, 2026 (TV)	1305	N/A
305a	6a	"Air Rescue: Pups Save the Mother Tree"	Jeffrey Duteil	June 19, 2026	March 7, 2026	1306a	N/A
305b	6b	"Pups Save the Ice Cream Truck"	Ashley Griffis	June 19, 2026	March 7, 2026	1306b	N/A
306a	7a	"Pups Save a Woodland Walrus"	Robin J. Stein	June 26, 2026	April 11, 2026	1307a	N/A
306b	7b	"Pups Save a DJ in a Jam"	Louise Moon	June 26, 2026	April 11, 2026	1307b	N/A
307	8	"Pups vs. the Dino Doubles"	Louise Moon	TBA	September 3, 2026 (TVOKids website); September 12, 2026 (TV)	1308	TBD
308a	9a	"Pups Save Dino Digi and Tal"	Mario López-Cordero	September 11, 2026	September 3, 2026 (TVOKids website); September 19, 2026 (TV)	1309a	N/A
308b	9b	"Pups Save a Dino Daredevil"	Robin J. Stein	September 11, 2026	September 3, 2026 (TVOKids website); September 19, 2026 (TV)	1309b	N/A
309a	10a	"Pups Save a Dino Documentary"	Max Beaudry	September 18, 2026	September 3, 2026 (TVOKids website); September 26, 2026 (TV)	1310a	N/A
309b	10b	"Pups Save a Grump-a-Saurus"	Jeffrey Duteil	September 18, 2026	September 3, 2026 (TVOKids website); September 26, 2026 (TV)	1310b	N/A
310a	11a	"Pups and the Digi Tal Safety Suit"	Mario López-Cordero	July 10, 2026	April 25, 2026	1311a	N/A
310b	11b	"Pups Put a Mouse on the Move"	Amanda McNeice	July 10, 2026	April 25, 2026	1311b	N/A
311a	12a	"Pups Save a Solar System"	Shayna Fine	July 17, 2026	May 9, 2026	1312a	N/A
311b	12b	"Pups Save the Suitcase"	Evan Thaler Hickey	July 17, 2026	May 9, 2026	1312b	N/A
312a	13a	"Fire Rescue: Pups and the Missing Water Mystery"	Kyle Dooley	July 24, 2026	May 23, 2026	1313a	N/A
312b	13b	"Pups Save a Squirrely Cabin"	Mark Purdy	July 24, 2026	May 23, 2026	1313b	N/A

=== Season 14 (2026) ===
No. overall	No. in season	Title	Written by	U.S. air date	Canadian air date	Prod. code	U.S. viewers (millions)
313a	1a	"Pups & the Ace of Skies"	Leah Wolfson	August 7, 2026	TBA	1401a	N/A
313b	1b	"Pups Save the Babysitter"	Story by : Jeff Sager; Teleplay by : Veronica Pickett	August 7, 2026	TBA	1401b	N/A
314a	2a	"Pups Stop the Garboni"	Melissa Oskouie	July 31, 2026	TBA	1402a	N/A
314b	2b	"Pups Save the Porcupine"	Scott Gray	July 31, 2026	TBA	1402b	N/A
315a	3a	"Pups Save Splashy Bottom"	Lindsey Owen	August 14, 2026	TBA	1403a	N/A
315b	3b	"Pups Save a Daring Tour Guide"	Senibo Myers	August 14, 2026	TBA	1403b	N/A
316	4	"Pups Save the Dinosaur Pirates"	Louise Moon	October 2, 2026	TBA	1404	N/A
317a	5a	"Pups Save the Farm Festival"	Clark Stubbs	August 21, 2026	TBA	1405a	N/A
317b	5b	"Pups and the Bubble Bath Bay"	Amanda McNeice	August 21, 2026	TBA	1405b	N/A
318a	6a	"Pups vs. the Velociraptors!"	Mario López-Cordero	September 24, 2026 (Amazon)	TBA	1406a	N/A
318b	6b	"Pups Save a T-Rex in Trouble"	Max Beaudry	September 24, 2026 (Amazon)	TBA	1406b	N/A
319	7	"Pups and the Clumsy Heroes!"	Robin J. Stein	September 28, 2026 (Amazon)	TBA	1407	N/A
320a	8a	"Pups Save the Baby Brachiosaurus!"	Ashley Griffis	September 30, 2026 (Amazon)	TBA	1408a	N/A
320b	8b	"Pups and the Dino Racers"	Amanda McNeice	September 30, 2026 (Amazon)	TBA	1408b	N/A

== Specials (2018–26) ==
No.	Title	Written by	U.S. air date	Canadian air date	Prod. code	U.S. viewers (millions)
1	"Mighty Pups"	Andy Guerdat and Steve Sullivan	November 12, 2018	October 6, 2018	999	1.99
After one of Mayor Humdinger's plans cause a glowing meteor to land in Adventure Bay, it gives the PAW Patrol pups superpowers. But Mayor Humdinger's nephew Harold uses his powers in advantage to kidnap Ryder and take over Adventure Bay, leaving Chase to lead his friends to help save the day.
2	"Ready Race Rescue"	Andy Guerdat and Steve Sullivan	November 11, 2019	August 5, 2019	996	0.96
Marshall dreams of becoming a racer like his big racing hero, the Whoosh. When Mayor Humdinger and his cousin the Cheetah steal the other racers' race cars and cheat during the race, causing the Whoosh to injure himself, Ryder and the PAW Patrol become the race car pit crew to solve the case, while Marshall takes the Whoosh's place of winning the race.
3	"Jet to the Rescue"	Louise Moon	September 25, 2020	September 25, 2020	993	0.75
The PAW Patrol, along with the royal pup Sweetie, must help the Princess of Barkingburg defend the land on her birthday from the Duke of Flappington, the Princess of Barkingburg's cousin who had acquired the power of a mighty levitation gem to combined to his own. This leads to Skye to face off her fear of eagles and lead the PAW Patrol into their biggest aerial rescue.
4	"Valiente: A Tracker Story"	Jorge Aguirre	October 3, 2025	October 17, 2025 (Netflix)	989	N/A
Tracker and Carlos come across a series of nocturnal animals fleeing the scariest part of the region - the Shadow Jungle - Tracker must brave his fear of the dark and stop a new villain, Lucita Mala, who believes the entire jungle belongs to her!
5	"A PAW Patrol Christmas"	Story by : Tone Thyne; Teleplay by : Cal Brunker & Bob Barlen	November 28, 2025(CBS/Paramount+); December 12, 2025 (Nickelodeon)	November 17, 2025 (Netflix); November 28, 2025 (TV) (Note: The special aired on Global, CBC, TVOntario and CTV2.)	986	N/A
Santa gets ill, Christmas is cancelled in Adventure Bay, Mayor Humdinger goes to the North Pole to take all the gifts for himself. Rubble and the rest of the PAW Patrol will have to make a sacrifice to stop Mayor Humdinger from ruining Christmas!
6	"Rocky's Cat-astrophe"	Aury Wallington	January 30, 2026	February 28, 2026	977	N/A
When one of Humdinger's schemes goes awry, a Junkyard Kitten's home is destroyed and Rocky bites off more than he can chew when he invites the kitten to stay at the Lookout overnight. While the kitten causes more trouble than expected, Rocky learns that even heroes need help.
7	"Everest and the Big Chill"	-	TBA	June 6, 2026 (Knowledge Network)	TBA	TBD
8	"A Zuma Pirate Adventure"	Matthew Beans	October 30, 2026	TBA	TBA	TBD

== Shorts (2020–23) ==
No.	Title	Written by	U.S. air date	Canadian air date	Prod. code	U.S. viewers (millions)
1	"Charged Up: Pups vs. the Super Sonic Sound System"	James Backshall	March 23, 2020	TBA	101	N/A
2	"Charged Up: Pups vs. a Copycat Marshall"	James Backshall	April 3, 2020	TBA	102	N/A
3	"Charged Up: Pups vs. the Teenybots"	James Backshall	April 10, 2020	TBA	103	N/A
4	"Charged Up: Pups vs. a Super Meow Meow"	James Backshall	April 10, 2020	TBA	104	N/A
5	"Charged Up: Pups vs. a Teleporting Copycat"	James Backshall	April 24, 2020	TBA	105	N/A
6	"Charged Up: Pups Save a Super-Powered Puplantis"	James Backshall	April 24, 2020	TBA	106	N/A
7	"Dino Rescue: Pups Save a Tromping Triceratops"	James Backshall	August 21, 2020	TBA	107	N/A
8	"Dino Rescue: Pups Save a Baby Stegosaurus"	James Backshall	August 21, 2020	TBA	108	N/A
9	"Dino Rescue: Pups Save a Dino Christmas"	James Backshall	November 13, 2020	TBA	109	N/A
10	"Dino Rescue: Pups Save a Pterodactyl Egg"	James Backshall	November 13, 2020	TBA	110	N/A
11	"Dino Rescue: Pups Save the Baby Raptors"	James Backshall	December 18, 2020	TBA	111	0.55
12	"Dino Rescue: Pups Save a Tyrannosaurus' Birthday"	James Backshall	December 18, 2020	TBA	112	0.55
13	"Cat Pack/PAW Patrol Rescue: Rubble and Wild and a Yarn Ball!"	Jeffrey Duteil	July 8, 2022; August 5, 2022 (full episode)	April 16, 2022 (TV); April 1, 2022 (Netflix)	113/825a	0.22
14	"Cat Pack/PAW Patrol Rescue: Skye and Rory Flip It"	Michael Stokes	July 15, 2022; August 5, 2022 (full episode)	April 23, 2022 (TV); April 1, 2022 (Netflix)	114/825b	0.22
15	"Cat Pack/PAW Patrol Rescue: Marshall, Leo and a Ferris Wheel"	Jeffrey Duteil	July 22, 2022; August 5, 2022 (full episode)	April 30, 2022 (TV); April 1, 2022 (Netflix)	115/825c	0.22
16	"Cat Pack/PAW Patrol Rescue: Everest, Shade and the Mountain Goat"	Louise Moon	July 29, 2022; August 5, 2022 (full episode)	May 6, 2022 (TV); April 1, 2022 (Netflix)	116/825d	0.22
17	"Pups Stop a Big Leak"	Andy Guerdat and Steve Sullivan	April 21, 2023	May 7, 2022 (TV); April 1, 2022 (Netflix)	117/826a	N/A
18	"Pups Save a Baby Anteater"	Robin J. Stein	April 21, 2023	May 7, 2022 (TV); April 1, 2022 (Netflix)	118/826b	N/A
19	"Pups Save a Hatch Day"	Sean Jara	April 21, 2023	May 7, 2022 (TV); April 1, 2022 (Netflix)	119/826c	N/A
20	"Pups Save the Munchie Mobile"	James Backshall	April 21, 2023	May 7, 2022 (TV); April 1, 2022 (Netflix)	120/826d	N/A

== Films (2021–26) ==
Title	Written by	Original release date
Paw Patrol: The Movie	Story by : Billy Frolick; Screenplay by : Bob Barlen, Cal Brunker & Billy Frolick	August 20, 2021
The Paw Patrol are called to Adventure City by a dog named Liberty when Mayor Humdinger has become the Mayor of Adventure City.
Paw Patrol: The Mighty Movie	Story by : Bob Barlen, Cal Brunker & Shane Morris; Screenplay by : Bob Barlen & Cal Brunker	September 29, 2023
A meteor has crashed into Adventure City granting the Paw Patrol superpowers into the Mighty Pups. The powers of the meteor are targeted by meteor expert Victoria Vance and Mayor Humdinger.
Paw Patrol: The Dino Movie	Cal Brunker & Bob Barlen	August 14, 2026
The Paw Patrol finds themselves stranded on a mysterious tropical island inhabited by dinosaurs.
