= Big-Headed Kid and Small-Headed Father =

- Traditional Chinese: 大頭兒子和小頭爸爸
- Simplified Chinese: 大头儿子和小头爸爸
- Hanyu Pinyin: Dàtóu erzi hé xiǎotóu bàba
- Directed by: Wei Xing; Cui Shiyu
- Country of origin: China
- Original language: Mandarin
- No. of seasons: 2
- No. of episodes: 156

Production
- Running time: 10 minutes
- Production companies: CCTV; Shanghai Oriental TV

Original release
- Network: CCTV 1
- Release: December 1995 – 2002

Big-Headed Kid and Small-Headed Father (simplified Chinese: 大头儿子和小头爸爸; traditional Chinese: 大頭兒子和小頭爸爸; pinyin: Dàtóu erzi hé xiǎotóu bàba) is a 1995 Chinese animated cartoon television series jointly produced by CCTV and Shanghai Oriental TV. It stars a family in Shanghai. Small-Headed father caters to the needs of his wife and child. Charles Liu of The Beijinger stated that unlike Homer Simpson, Small-Headed Father lacks selfishness, but otherwise it "firmly has The Simpsons in mind when it comes to dopey dads."

In 1996, the series was first piloted on Shanghai Oriental TV and CCTV-1's children's program Animation City. By mid-year, the first 26 episodes had been completed. Later that year, the first season was set at 78 episodes, with the first 39 episodes completed by the end of the year. The entire first season was completed and aired in 1998. The second season, also consisting of 78 episodes, premiered in 2002.

Since the late 1990s, Big-Headed Son and Small-Headed Father has been repeatedly broadcast on CCTV and various regional networks. It was also released on VCD and received the 16th Golden Eagle Award for Popular Television.

A rebooted series, New Big-Headed Son and Small-Headed Father, premiered on November 28, 2013, on CCTV Children's Channel during the Galaxy Theater programming block. To date, the reboot has eight seasons. Season six is titled Heroic Dreams, season seven Smart Little Butler, and season eight Happy Family Camp. Since 2014, a 50-minute special episode has aired annually during the Spring Festival. In addition, five animated feature films and two live-action sitcom adaptations have been produced—the latter airing in 2018 and 2022 respectively, with a combined total of 200 episodes, directed by Ying Da.
