= List of Malaysian animated films =

This is a list of Malaysian animated films, sorted by year, in Malaysia.

== 1990s ==
- Silat Lagenda (1998)

== 2000s ==
- Cheritera (2001)
- Putih (2001)
- Budak Lapok (2007)
- Geng: The Adventure Begins (2009) - Malaysia's first 3D animated film

== 2010s ==
- SeeFood (2011)
- War of the Worlds: Goliath (2012)
- Bola Kampung: The Movie (2013) - Malaysia's first 3D stereoscopic film
- Ribbit (2014)
- SuperSquad (2014)
- Oh La La! (2015)
- BoBoiBoy The Movie (2016)
- Upin & Ipin: Jeng Jeng Jeng! (2016)
- Hora Horey Concert Didi & Friends (2018) - Malaysia's first ever animated concert film
- Wheely (2018)
- Upin & Ipin: The Lone Gibbon Kris (2019)
- BoBoiBoy Movie 2 (2019)
- Ejen Ali The Movie (2019)

== 2020s ==
- Hora Horey Cinema Concert Didi & Friends (2021)
- Mechamato Movie (2022) - Malaysia's first P13 / 13-rated animated film and Astro Shaw's first ever animated production film
- Didi & Friends the Movie (2023)
- Dongeng Sang Kancil (2024)
- Ejen Ali The Movie 2 (2025)
- Papa Zola The Movie (2025)
- BoBoiBoy Movie 3: Ghost of Gur'latan (2027)
- The White Rajah of Sarawak (2028)
- Nirnama (2029)

== See also ==
- Malaysian animation
