= Misi Mustahak =

2005 Malaysian animated short film

- Opening title logo
- Directed by: Nizam Abdul Razak; Usamah Zaid Yasin; Safwan Abdul Karim; Nazrul Hadi Nazlan
- Screenplay by: Nizam Abdul Razak; Usamah Zaid Yasin; Safwan Abdul Karim; Nazrul Hadi Nazlan
- Starring: Nizam Abdul Razak; Usamah Zaid Yasin; Safwan Abdul Karim; Nazrul Hadi Nazlan
- Production company: Multimedia University (MMU)
- Release date: 2005
- Running time: 7 minutes
- Country: Malaysia
- Language: Malay

Misi Mustahak (Important Mission) is a 2005 Malaysian animated short film produced as a final-year project at the Multimedia University (MMU), Cyberjaya. Written and directed by Nizam Abdul Razak and Usamah Zaid Yasin with Safwan Abdul Karim and Nazrul Hadi Nazlan, the film follows elderly nursing-home residents who plan a mission to sneak back into the television room after being escorted out by a caretaker. The short film received recognition at local and regional film awards.

== Plot ==
The short film begins with a spy being lowered into a high-security facility while suspended by cables. He accesses a computer and retrieves a diskette, but accidentally drops it onto a laser-protected floor while attempting to place it in his shirt pocket. The sequence is then interrupted by a breaking news montage, revealing that the scene is part of a film.

Later, three elderly residents are shown in the nursing home's television room, watching the film and appearing disappointed by the interruption. A caretaker enters and instructs them to return to their rooms, as it is late at night. They initially ignore her, but after being scolded, they reluctantly return to their rooms.

Afterward, they devise a plan to obtain the key from the caretaker to gain access to the television room. Imagining themselves as spies, they consider various tactics to get the key. They eventually succeed in entering the television room but are forced to hide when the caretaker unexpectedly returns.

== Production ==
Misi Mustahak is an animated short film produced in 2005 by a group of students at the Multimedia University (MMU), Cyberjaya as their final-year project. The team, known as Raven Studios, consisted of classmates Nizam Abdul Razak, Usamah Zaid Yasin, Safwan Abdul Karim, and Nazrul Hadi Nazlan. They began the project by brainstorming ideas for a simple, humorous story and ultimately decided to focus on elderly residents of a nursing home as the subject. The short also parodied spy films such as Mission: Impossible. Production spanned approximately six months across two academic semesters. During the first semester, the team focused on scripting and storyboarding, though the early storyboards required refinement to improve visual clarity and pacing. The second semester was dedicated to the main production process.

Throughout production, the team faced challenges such as limited experience in collaborative animation work, time constraints, and first-time voice-over recording experience. They used a range of software and digital tools to create the short film. Maya and Sketchbook were used for 3D modeling and animation, while Adobe Photoshop supported texturing and concept art. Adobe After Effects and Adobe Premiere facilitated compositing and video editing, with Particle Illusion employed for special effects. Macromedia Flash contributed to 2D animation sequences. Audio production was handled using Sound Forge and Vegas Pro, alongside AV VCS for sound effects.

== Reception ==
The short film was screened at the final industry showcase in the MMU theatre, attended by 200–300 people, including lecturers, industry representatives, alumni, students, and family members. It received a positive response from the audience. The short later gained popularity, particularly among university students across Malaysia, after being widely shared. It was uploaded to YouTube on 14 November 2005.

== Awards ==
The animated short film received several accolades following its release. It won Overall Best and Gold Medal Short Animation Film (Open Category) at the 10th Malaysian Video Awards (MVA) in 2005. The film also received the Best Tertiary Student Project (Creative Multimedia) award at MSC-APICTA 2005, which qualified the team to represent Malaysia at the Southeast Asian level in Thailand, where it won the regional competition against entries from 16 other countries. Additionally, the film was included in the Best of Multimedia University Collection 2005 at Creative Pixels, National Art Gallery.

Year	Presenter/Festival	Award/Category	Status
2005	10th Malaysian Video Awards	Overall Best	Won
2005	10th Malaysian Video Awards	Gold Medal Short Animation Film (Open Category)	Won
2005	Asia Pacific ICT Alliance Awards (APICTA)	Best of Tertiary Student Projects	Won
2005	Creative Pixels, National Art Gallery	Best of Multimedia University Collection 2005	Won

== Legacy ==
After graduating from MMU in 2005, Nizam, Usamah, and Safwan were invited by Burhanuddin Md Radzi, who wanted to establish a film company and produce a feature film. They pitched a film idea to him and subsequently co-founded Les' Copaque Production with Burhanuddin and his wife, Hajah Ainon Ariff. Shortly afterward, Nazrul also joined the studio.

They worked on Geng: Pengembaraan Bermula (Geng: The Adventure Begins), Malaysia's first 3D animated feature film, which was directed by Nizam. The film was based on a story pitched by Nizam, Usamah, and Safwan. During its production, they were also involved in developing its spin-off animated television series, Upin & Ipin, which premiered on 14 September 2007. Nizam directed the first three seasons of the series, while Usamah directed the fourth season. Geng was later released on 12 February 2009.

In September 2009, Nizam, Safwan, and several other original staffs of Les’ Copaque left the company and established their own animation studio, Monsta Studios (formerly Animonsta Studios). Shortly afterward, Nazrul joined the studio. The studio produced its first animated television series, BoBoiBoy, which premiered on 13 March 2011.

Usamah then leave Les’ Copaque in early 2013 after spent 7 years with the company and founded his own animation studio, WAU Animation in March that year. The studio produced its first animated television series, Ejen Ali, which premiered on 8 April 2016.

Misi Mustahak served as the first stepping stone for its creators, providing them with the experience and recognition that would shape Malaysia's modern animation industry through projects like Upin & Ipin, BoBoiBoy, and Ejen Ali.
