= Upin & Ipin Universe =

2025 video game

- Developer: Les' Copaque Production
- Publisher: Streamline Studios
- Engine: Unreal Engine 5
- Platforms: Nintendo Switch; PlayStation 4; PlayStation 5; Windows
- Release: WW: 17 July 2025
- Genre: Adventure
- Modes: Single-player, multiplayer

Upin & Ipin Universe is a 2025 adventure console game developed by Les' Copaque Production and published by Streamline Studios. It is based on the television series Upin & Ipin, and was released on 17 July 2025 for Nintendo Switch, PlayStation 4, PlayStation 5 and Windows.

== Gameplay ==
Upin & Ipin Universe is a "vibrant open-world" and "beautifully crafted" kampung environment, which enable players to explore the liveliness of the fictional Kampung Durian Runtuh, enriched with the authentic Southeast Asian culture.

The game offers over 12 hours of story contents, along with adventures and daily activities inspired by Malaysian kampung life. There are six minigames available: Fishing, Farming, Critter Catching, Racing, Cooking and Spinning Top. Some of the minigames involve platforming.

== Development ==
In February 2024, Les' Copaque Production founder and managing director, Burhanuddin Md Radzi announced that a paid console game based on the Upin & Ipin series is in development beginning in 2023. The company invested RM15 million to develop the console game, which was co-developed by Malaysia-based American online game developer, Streamline Studios. He said that the game is a "family-friendly" and contains "no violence" and it is "suitable for all ages". Upin & Ipin Universe is built in Unreal Engine 5, which the company chose due to its "impressive graphics capabilities". It became the first PlayStation game to use full voice acting in Bahasa Malaysia, the national language of Malaysia besides of English, with subtitle support.

== Release ==
Upin & Ipin Universe is originally scheduled to be released in September 2024 through several gaming consoles, but was delayed due to technical reasons. However, the game was officially released on 17 July 2025.

The game's launching was held at a press conference in Kuala Lumpur on 4 July and officiated by the Digital Minister, Gobind Singh Deo. He described the game as a great achievement of Malaysian gaming industry.

The game's teaser trailer was released on 27 February 2025 on its official YouTube channel, while its official trailer was launched during the Summer Games Fest 2025 and released on its official YouTube channel on 8 June 2025.

== Reception ==
Upon its release, Upin & Ipin Universe received mixed reviews. On the video game distribution service Steam, only 49% out of the 37 reviews were positive. While the game's cultural elements and local charm were praised, there are many complains from players about the game's "bugs, visual problems, unstable graphics, and poor performance". There are also complaints from video game streamers regarding the game's "weak storyline" and "copyright claim" issues.
