= Upin & Ipin: The Lone Gibbon Kris =

2019 Malaysian animated adventure film

- Theatrical release poster
- Malay: Upin & Ipin: Keris Siamang Tunggal
- Directed by: Adam B Amiruddin; Syed Nurfaiz Khalid B Syed Ibrahim; Ahmad Razuri B Roseli
- Story by: Hjh Ainon Bt Ariff; Nur Naquyah Bt Burhanuddin; Aliya Bt Nazlan
- Based on: Upin & Ipin; Animated series by Burhanuddin Md Radzi & Ainon Ariff
- Starring: Asyiela Putri Azhar; Ahmad Mawardi Abdul Rahman; Mohd Amir Asyraf Mohd Noor Rashid; Fakhrul Razi; Ernie Zakri; Irfan Fahim
- Edited by: Ahmad Razuri Roseli
- Music by: Andrew Bong
- Production company: Les' Copaque Production
- Distributed by: Golden Screen Cinemas (Malaysia); MNC Pictures (Indonesia); CineScreen (Philippines); Walt Disney Studios Motion Pictures (International)
- Release date: 21 March 2019
- Running time: 100 minutes
- Country: Malaysia
- Language: Malay
- Budget: MYR 20 million
- Box office: MYR 26.20 million (US$6.26 million)

Upin & Ipin: The Lone Gibbon Kris (Malay: Upin & Ipin: Keris Siamang Tunggal) is a 2019 Malaysian Malay-language animated fantasy adventure film. The film follows the adventure of the twins and their friends in the fantastical kingdom of Inderaloka, where they have to save the kingdom from the evil king called Raja Bersiong. It is the third feature film based on the animated TV series Upin & Ipin by Les' Copaque Production, after Geng: The Adventure Begins (2009) and Upin & Ipin: Jeng Jeng Jeng! (2016). (Note: A feature film titled Laksamana Upin & Ipin was previously planned in 2011, but it was eventually cancelled.) With a budget of RM20 million, it is the most expensive Malaysian animation and film ever made.

Its original Malay-language version is released on 21 March 2019 in Malaysia, Brunei and Singapore. The film has grossed around RM26 million in Malaysia, making it the second-highest grossing local animation film in Malaysian cinema.

The film won the Best Feature Film at the 2019 Montreal International Animation Film Festival.

== Plot ==
5-year-old twins Upin and Ipin and their fellow friends: Ehsan, Fizi, Mail, Jarjit, Mei Mei and Susanti live in the village Kampung Durian Runtuh. One day, they stumble across a mystical Malay dagger named the lone gibbon kris. The kris is magical and opens a portal that transports the whole gang to the Kingdom of Inderaloka. As they try to find their way back home, they meet several classic characters from the Malaysian and Malay folklore. Together they have to help restore the kingdom back to its past glory and fight back the evil king, Raja Bersiong who is hatching an evil plan to destroy the kingdom.

== Voice cast ==
- Asyiela Putri Azhar as Upin and Ipin
- Ahmad Mawardi Abdul Rahman as Raja Bersiong
- Mohd Amir Asyraf Mohd Noor Rashid as Mat Jenin
- Irfan Fahim as Belalang
- Fakhrul Razi as Nakhoda Ragam
- Ernie Zakri as Bawang Putih and Bawang Merah
- Muhammad Fareez Daniel as Ehsan
- Muhammad Musyrif Azzat as Mail
- Muhammad Hafiz Hassan as Jarjit
- Tang Ying Sowk as Mei Mei
- Rufaidah Mohamed Fadzil as Fizi
- Andhika Astari and Siti Nor Adwin Bt Safie as Susanti
- Ahmad Razuri Roseli as Pak Belalang
- Siti Hasmah Taiban as Mak Deruma
- Siti Khairunnisa Binti Mohamed Riduan as Kak Ros
- Hjh. Ainon Bt Ariff as Opah
- Hj. Burhanuddin Md Radzi as Tok Dalang

== Production ==
The production took 5 years to complete, and the cost is almost RM20 million, making it the most expensive Malaysian film ever made. Producer of Les' Copaque Production, Burhanuddin Md. Radzi revealed that there are some scenes that were finished earlier and were changed afterwards as the scenes did not live up to their set standards. One of the examples was changing the same scene 80 times until someone from the 200 people of the production team almost resigned. They have been challenging themselves to highlight Malay folk tale and culture in the film, taking Star Wars as a good example of putting something imaginary in a film. English dubbing has been made in Los Angeles for international releases.

== Music ==
The lead composer for this film is Sarawak-born Andrew Bong. As the lead composer, he said that composing original music that can move people’s emotions is a challenge while it is even more challenging to write the right music to fit a film. He was first approached by the producer, Burhanuddin Md. Radzi to compose Hollywood-style score but still includes traditional Malay elements.

Two main official theme songs of the film are "Keris Sakti" by Fakhrul Razi and "Buai Laju-Laju" by Ernie Zakri. Fakhrul Razi, a Bruneian singer, was approached by Hjh Ainon Ariff the creative director to sing the song as she wanted a singer that can sing with Bollywood-style after he was viral in India the previous year. He also was given the opportunity to voice Nakhoda Ragam in the film. Ernie Zakri, a Malaysian singer who is famous for her high-pitch vocal performance in AJL32, was also given the opportunity to voice Bawang Putih and Bawang Merah after she finished recording the song in the studio.

== Release ==
The first official trailer was released on 6 September 2018. The second official trailer was released on 8 January 2019. It was released in Malaysia, Brunei, and Singapore on 21 March 2019 in original Malay-language. Vietnamese dubbed version was released on 26 April 2019 in Vietnam, while the Indonesian version was released on 9 May 2019. It is also one of the very few Malaysian films that can break into Indonesia's biggest cinema operator, Cinema 21 along with Polis Evo 2.

It was released on 28 August 2019 in Philippines with an English dubbed. Its Mandarin version is scheduled to be released soon in China by 2019. The film was released limitedly on 9 November 2019 in Los Angeles, US, in order to meet the nomination criteria of Academy Awards. The film was submitted for consideration in the Best Animation Film category in the 2020 Academy Awards, but was not nominated.

== Reception ==
Days of screening	Cumulative sales in Malaysia
4 days (24 March)	RM5.3 million (US$1.26 million)
7 days (27 March)	RM12.1 million (US$2.88 million)
21 days (10 April)	RM25 million (US$5.96 million)
68 days (27 May)	RM26.20 million (US$6.30 million)

The film was shown in Malaysian cinemas for 2 months. It grossed around RM26.19 million in Malaysia, becoming the second-highest grossing local animation film of all time in Malaysian cinema. It is also the fourth-highest grossing local film of all time.

=== Awards and nominations ===
Year	Award	Category	Nominee	Result	Ref(s)
2019	Asian Academy Creative Awards	Best Feature Film - Malaysia	Upin & Ipin: The Lone Gibbon Kris	Won	
2019	Beijing Animation and Game Industry Awards	Best Animation of The Year	Upin & Ipin: The Lone Gibbon Kris	Won	
2020	Malaysia Film Festival	Best Animated Film	Upin & Ipin: The Lone Gibbon Kris	Nominated	

=== Reviews from the media ===
During the screening of Upin & Ipin: The Lone Gibbon Kris in Vietnam, some Vietnamese news sites published their review and thoughts about the movie.

The newssite of the Radio the Voice of Vietnam (VOV), Vietnam's national public radio network, praised the movie's storyline and the studio's effort of introducing Malaysian culture.

"[...] The movie did an excellent job in delivering positive educational message by including the message of family bond, interpersonal skills and forgiveness in a clever way. [...] In the current globalization era, national cultural heritage of every nation is facing the threat of being demolished as the youth opt for exotic entertainment from foreign countries. Being well-understood about this trend, Les Copaque Studio had included various valuable scene [in the movie] to pay tribute and protect Malaysian culture value for the future generation."

Moveek, Vietnamese movie review platform, considered the film had a well-written plot and great audio-visual element, though having some pity errors.
