= Puteri (2014 TV series) =

Malaysian animated series

- Genre: Family; Fantasy
- Created by: Burhanuddin Md Radzi; Ainon Ariff
- Written by: Aliya Nazlan; Rezzuhawa Razali; Nor Fadlita Ayu; Nor Aizan Embong
- Directed by: Syed Nurfaiz Khalid
- Voices of: Adreena; Shazwina; Wani; Ilham; Hajar
- Opening theme: "Puteri" by Adreena
- Ending theme: "Puteri" by Adreena
- Country of origin: Malaysia
- Original language: Malay
- No. of episodes: 6

Production
- Producers: Burhanuddin Md Radzi; Ainon Ariff
- Running time: 8 minutes
- Production company: Les' Copaque Production

Original release
- Network: TV3; MNCTV
- Release: 20 November – 25 November 2014

Puteri (lit. Princess) is a Malaysian animated family-friendly fantasy television series showcasing the adventures of five sister-princess of the Lime Kingdom. Produced by Les' Copaque Production, it debuted a total of six episodes on TV3 from November 20–25, 2014.

== Synopsis ==
Puteri tells of the adventures of five sisters—the princesses of Limau. Puteri Limau Manis, the eldest and heir to the throne, is the considered beauty of the family, ridding of people's anger with relative ease. Next to her in age is Puteri Limau Kasturi, a warrior at heart and self-proclaimed tomboy who loves the outdoors and swordplay. Puteri Limau Purut is shy, timid, and loves a quiet time in her garden, but makes up for her bashfulness as the more intelligent of her sisters, contributed to her love of books. Puteri Limau Bali is the polar opposite of Purut: full of energy with her considered sparkling personality and her love for food and cooking. The baby of the family, Puteri Limau Nipis, is considered adorable and loves to play around the palace compound with her pet cat, Jebat.

== Characters ==
- Princess Limau Manis – At 18, she is the eldest of five sisters. She is heir to the throne. She looks pretty and often gives sweet words. When invited to the war, she is the most enthusiastic and optimistic of all. She was also forced to marry for an inheritance. Her scarf gives her the power of movement. In bizarre showings, animals are often shown to like Puteri Limau Manis.
- Princess Limau Kasturi – Kasturi, aged 17, is the King’s second daughter. She is coarse and heroic. Kasturi dislikes "princess ethics,” preferring to spend her time in fight practice. She has a powerful magic dagger.
- Princess Limau Purut – The third daughter of the King, Purut is 15 years-old. Her magical hairpin can cure any living thing, including plants. She is shy and pretty with hair covering a small part of her scarred face.
- Princess Limau Bali – She is the fourth daughter of the King and aged 14. She has a fat body compared to her siblings. Therefore, she is quite sensitive to the topic of weight. She is a good cook: her food does not seem exotic but it tastes good. She has a magical fan that can change in size and function.
- Princess Limau Nipis – She is 10 year-old and is the youngest. Her looks are so spoiled and naive. However, Nipis is actually a great investigator and knows all the intricacies of the palace. She is often accompanied by her pet cat, Jebat. She has a laid-back character and is stubborn. Nipis has a magical whip that is often used as a game.

In each episode, antagonists of men and magical creatures come to corrupt the kingdom. The princesses will have to band together and make use of their abilities to save their kingdom.

== Production ==
Following the successes of Upin & Ipin and Pada Zaman Dahulu, Les' Copaque Production announced a third animated series, eventually titled, Puteri, which began development at the end of 2012. The series’ theme song was sung by Adreena, one of the series' voice actors.

== Episodes ==
No. overall	No. in season	Title	Original release date
1	1	"Episode 1"	November 20, 2014
2	2	"Episode 2"	November 21, 2014
3	3	"Episode 3"	November 22, 2014
4	4	"Episode 4"	November 23, 2014
5	5	"Episode 5"	November 24, 2014
6	6	"Episode 6"	November 25, 2014

== Awards and nominations ==
Award	Year	Recipient(s) and nominee(s)	Category	Result	Ref.
ASEAN Character Award	2015	Puteri	Grand Prize	Won	
