= Grid fabric =

The Wireless Grid Fabric in communication is a MIMOS Berhad innovation for WiMAX multi-hop relay networks (IEEE802.16j) for rural area communication.

The idea of the Wireless Grid Fabric involves using multihop base stations (MR-BS) to forward messages to and from the network. Each relay station (RS) covers approximately two square kilometers of area with omnidirectional antennas. Each such square is called a cell. In this scheme, the network's scalability depends not on the number of nodes but the number of cells, each of which contains several nodes.

In any rural area community supported by a Wireless Grid Fabric, it is assumed that the main traffic (content) is self-created by the population (peer–to-peer), such as video streaming, VOIP, IPTV, and others which are all multicast-based. The Wireless Grid Fabric network has many advantages over other mesh technologies (i.e. WiFi-Mesh and Fixed WiMAX-Mesh), as it achieves hundreds of Mbit/s with mobility for hundreds of mobiles per service deployment.
