= Aliff Dalam 7 Dimensi =

2016 Malaysia film by Faisal Ishak

- Directed by: Faisal Ishak
- Written by: Anwari Ashraf; Ashraf Zain
- Produced by: Anwari Ashraf Hashim; Syahrul I. Shariffuddin
- Starring: Izzue Islam; Alif Satar; Juliana Evans; Kaka Azraff; Man Kadir; Hasnul Rahmat; Aleza Shadan
- Cinematography: Jepon Helmizan
- Edited by: Isazaly Mohd Isa; Beh Jing Qiang
- Music by: Ken Hor; Lo Shi Sheng
- Animation by: Usamah Zaid Yasin (WAU Animation); Faiz Hanafiah (WAU Animation)
- Visual effects by: Anuarul Zaid Suhut; Muhammad Fasya Daud; Roshfaizal Ariffin
- Production companies: Tayangan Unggul; Chain FX
- Distributed by: Astro Shaw
- Release date: 8 September 2016
- Running time: 107 minutes
- Country: Malaysia
- Language: Malay
- Budget: RM1.5 million
- Box office: RM1.73 million

Aliff Dalam 7 Dimensi (English: Aliff Inside 7 Dimension)is a 2016 Malaysian Malay-language action horror film. Co-produced and distributed by Astro Shaw, the film directed by Faizal Ishak written by Anwari Ashraf and Ashraf Zain and produced by Anwari Ashraf Hashim and Syahrul I. Shariffuddin. It stars Izzue Islam, Juliana Evans, Alif Satar, Man Kadir, Hasnul Rahmat, Kaka Azraff and Aleza Shadan.

The film ran its principal photography in Universiti Kebangsaan Malaysia (UKM) in Bangi and around Klang Valley especially in Selangor for 25 days.

The film released in Malaysian cinemas on 8 September 2016 nationwide. The film was dedicated to Sharulnizam Mazlan, costume designer and special effects makeup after he died a day after photography ended.

== Synopsis ==
Aliff is a socially reclusive student who has an ability to see supernatural beings from another dimension. All along, he has learned to ignore the spirits and never tells anybody about his ability, until he is unwittingly dragged into protecting his reckless, paranormal-seeking classmates Anna and Naim. Together, the three of them find themselves in a battle of epic proportions fighting other-worldly creatures.

== Plot ==
This film tells the story of Aliff (Izzue Islam) as a university student who has extraordinary advantages. Once Aliff's advantage is known to his friends, they begin to perform paranormal activities at night to study and record evidence of the entity's existence.

Aliff doesn't get along well with his friends at university because he doesn't want the advantages he has to be known to others. Aliff was able to keep his advantage a secret from everyone's knowledge, until one day, when some kind of ethereal creature attacked him, Aliff had to defend himself. Aliff's action shocked his classmates.

Since Aliff's incident in the classroom during the day, Anna (Juliana Evans) began to get close to Aliff to dig up Aliff's life story. Finally the secret of Aliff's advantage was revealed when he had to save Anna and Naim (Alif Satar) from a giant creature that attacked them.

Anna continues to invite Aliff to join her team tracking down the entity. Since then, the activities of Aliff, Anna and Naim began by documenting paranormal events around the university. Aliff's relationship with Anna and Naim also began to grow closer. Various strange incidents that the three of them went through while filming a documentary about ethereal beings.

Aliff finds out that Anna is possessed by a saka and he has to help his friends and save Anna from the saka. After Aliff fell from the 3rd floor of the building due to his actions, he met his late father (Hasnul Rahmat) in the grounds of the old house.

When Aliff regained consciousness in the hospital, Aliff reunited with Naim and Anna whose hand was injured. Naim is said to have a girlfriend, Izreen (Kaka Azraff) whom he once saved in an incident during the day. At the same time, Aliff began to fall in love with Anna. Seeing Aliff and Anna, Naim made a rude joke by telling them to just get married, causing Aliff to push Naim and cause him to injure his shoulder. Then Aliff found out that he had been possessed by his former self who returned in his body.

== Cast ==
- Izzue Islam as Aliff, a student who can see djinn through his vision
- Alif Satar as Naim, Aliff's roommate and cinematography for Anna's project
- Juliana Evans as Anna, a student who fall in love with Aliff
- Kaka Azraff as Izreen, Anna's roommate
- Man Kadir as Pak Zain
- Hasnul Rahmat as Aliff's father
- Aleza Shadan as Aliff's mother
- Isazely Mohd Isa as theater director

For supporting casts, Anuar Hamid portrayed as Professor, Mimi Haliza as Anna's other friend, Farid Ismail as security guard who appeared early in the film, Muhd Shahidan as kid who returned from study, Sufri Buangkan as Theater Actor of Djinn, Elyna Rose as janitor, Nana Azmi who works as production manager portrays crazy person, Riki Rikando Idris as Pak Zain's perennial and Khairul Mohamed as Aliff's perennial.

For special appearances, Putera Miqhaell Dariell become toyol, Ahmad Redza Idris as perennial's professor, Addirul Aliff as three characters (Anna's ghost. vampire and Galah Ghost), Zainal Isa as One-eyed Djinn, Mohamad Nazanudin (who also worked in visual effects department) as Ghost, Jashir Khan as right and left boots and Sharizan Daud as Remover. Afry Wijoyo supported as uncredited cast.

== Production ==
The film produced by Astro Shaw and Tayangan Unggul with visual effects and animation created by Chain FX and WAU Animation who just rise from the production of Ejen Ali.

Faisal Ishak who known for directed Juvana trilogy appointed as director after reading script from Anwari Ashraf; known for Polis Evo and Ashraf Zain. Principal photography ran in 25 days period in around Universiti Kebangsaan Malaysia (UKM) in Bangi and Klang Valley. Alif Satar who portrayed as Naim reveals that he was having such a scary experience while shooting from night and only ends in morning. Besides that, some of the crew believed to found ghost around lighting technical. Other than that, they also believed ghosts were flying above their canopy in around 5 am.

Sharulnizam Mazlan, also known as Syarified, worked for special effects makeup and costume designer, died a day after photography ended. Although. he managed to created special effects masks before collapsed on the set and sent to hospital. The film was dedicated to him on the credits.

30 percent of the film were treated with visual effects and animation by Chain FX (19 staffs worked in this film, including associate producers) and WAU Animation (4 staffs, including Usamah Zaid Yasin). Juliana Evans at first place sceptical about CGI elements, which subjected in the film.

== Release ==
The film released in Malaysian cinemas nationwide on 8 September 2016 with P13 classification. The film can be watched on Astro Shaw's YouTube starting 14 March 2024 in conjunction with Ramadan month.

== Promotion ==
To celebrate the release, Gempak Starz in association with Astro Shaw released its prequel from original idea by Tadatada and comic by Solar Team.

A music video by Modescape titled "Hilang"; directed and edited by Azwan Abdullah released on 10 September 2016 to promote the OST and the film.

== Music ==
"Hilang"

Single by Modescape
- Released: August 16, 2016
- Studio: Studio 21:05, Kuala Lumpur
- Length: 3:55
- Composer: Modescape
- Lyricist: Shahril Shah (Shah Modescape)

"Kudrat"

Single by Kaka Azraff
- Released: September 8, 2016
- Length: 3:41
- Composers: Ken Hor; Lo Shi Seng
- Lyricist: Anwari Ashraf

Two original soundtracks were used in the film. Firstly, the main OST performed by Modescape titled "Hilang"; written with vocals by Shahril Shah (Shah Modescape) distributed by Universal Music Malaysia. It was originally released in 2015. Another soundtrack were performed by Kaka Azraff titled "Kudrat" with lyrics by Anwari Ashraf. Both of the song can be streamed in Spotify.
