= Les' Copaque Production =

Malaysian animation studio

Les' Copaque Production Sdn. Bhd.
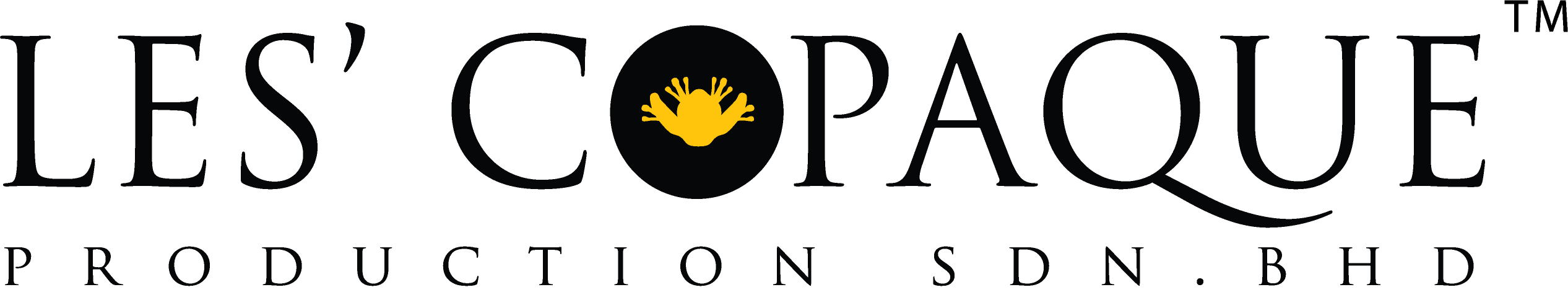
- Type: Private
- Industry: Animation; Live action
- Founded: December 12, 2005; 20 years ago
- Founders: Burhanuddin Md Radzi; Ainon Ariff
- Headquarters: Shah Alam, Selangor, Malaysia
- Area served: Worldwide
- Key people: Burhanuddin Md Radzi (Managing Director); Ainon Ariff (Chief Content Director); Nur Naquyah Burhanuddin (Director of Creative Content)
- Number of employees: 200 (2022)
- Website: lescopaque.com

Les' Copaque Production Sdn. Bhd. is a Malaysian animation and live-action production company, based in Shah Alam, Selangor. Founded by Burhanuddin Md Radzi and his wife, Ainon Ariff in 2005, it is known for producing the television series Upin & Ipin (since 2007), Pada Zaman Dahulu (since 2011) and Puteri (2014) as well as feature films Geng: The Adventure Begins (2009), Upin & Ipin: Jeng Jeng Jeng! (2016), Upin & Ipin: The Lone Gibbon Kris (2019) and Dongeng Sang Kancil (2024). An MSC Malaysia-status company, the studio's logo is a yellow frog named Si Polan sitting above a coconut shell.

== History ==
Burhanuddin Md Radzi and his wife, Ainon Ariff, co-founded Les' Copaque on December 12, 2005 and start operations in January 2006 with 4 staffs. The company is based in Shah Alam, Selangor. Burhanuddin previously have spent 20 years in the oil and gas industry. Former Multimedia University's (MMU) students – Nizam Razak, Usamah Zaid Yasin, Anas Abdul Aziz and Safwan Karim also co-founded the company and recruited as staffs. Nizam, Anas and Safwan remained a Les' Copaque staff permanently until 2009 when they left the company to set up Animonsta Studios and Usamah until 2013 when he founded WAU Animation. Burhanuddin recounted that the company's name was inspired by the Malay phrase, "last kopek" which means "last chance" where its pronunciation changed as it seems to be like French language.

"Last kopek... because I chose the animation as my last attempt to create my own success. But I deliberately named the company as Les' Copaque so that it would 'sound international' for the business interest." (Note: Original: "Last kopek... kerana saya pilih bidang animasi ini sebagai usaha terakhir untuk mencipta kejayaan tersendiri. Tapi saya sengaja namakan syarikat ini Les’ Copaque supaya ‘berbunyi international’ demi kepentingan bisnes,".)

— Burhanuddin on the company's name.

Les' Copaque's logo features a little yellow frog called Si Polan who sitting on a coconut shell, which "symbolising the idea of thinking outside the box and dreaming big". It comes from the Malay proverb "bagai katak di bawah tempurung", which literally translated as "a frog under a coconut shell".

The studio has been at the forefront of development for Malaysian animation industry. In 2006, Nizam and two others' first animation project, Misi Mustahak won the Asia Pacific ICT Alliance Awards (APICTA) for Best of Tertiary Student Projects, and Best of MVA at the Malaysian Video Awards. A year after its establishment, Les' Copaque produced an animated short film, Geng: The Adventure Begins which won the Best Animated Film and Best Animated Director at the inaugural 2006 Short Film Awards, organised by Filem Negara Malaysia (FNM).

The studio produced Upin & Ipin in conjunction with Ramadhan and Shawwal, while its first animated feature film Geng: The Adventure Begins, also features the eponymous twin brothers, is in the making. After the series launched in 2007, it has gone on to achieve commercial success and critical acclaim internationally. Geng was released on 12 February 2009 and managed to collect around RM 6.2 million, making it one of the highest-grossing Malaysian films in history.

In May 2007, the company partnered with Zhongnan Group Animation Video to co-produced a 90-minute 3D animated film, the Essential Art of War, which was later abandoned. The film's budget estimated about RM25 million.

Les' Copaque started its merchandising business at the end of 2007 with the establishment of LC Merchandising, which sells the company's products and merchandises, including t-shirts and mugs.

In 2009, the company set up its motion picture subsidiary, LC Film (formerly Bruang Filem), which specialized on production of live-action programs, television dramas and movies. The studio's first release was Zaiton: Ceritaku (2012), a biopic based on the life and career of singer, Zaiton Sameon. Other LC Film releases include Makcik Bawang and Jiwa Tanpa Jiwa.

Following the success of Geng, Les' Copaque announced the following Upin & Ipin films, Upin & Ipin: Angkasa, which was slated for 2011 release and eventually cancelled. It was replaced with Laksamana Upin & Ipin, which also shares the same fate due to unexpected financial and schedule situation. The cancelled films eventually replaced by Upin & Ipin: Jeng Jeng Jeng! which was released in 2016.

In 2011, Les' Copaque released Pada Zaman Dahulu (Once Upon A Time), a collection of famous local animal folklore told in a style different from Upin & Ipin and began aired on TV Alhijrah. The series become the first animated series in the country to feature computer animation techniques.

In 2014, Les' Copaque established its learning arm, Les' Copaque Animation Academy to train skillful and talented animators in the country following the lack of experience and skills from university or college graduates majoring in animation. The company partnered with the Japanese special effect and production company, Tsuburaya Productions to produce the crossover series Ultraman Ribut as part of Upin & Ipin and the Ultra Series. The crossover began aired on TV9 from 14 to 16 November 2014.

The company then produced Puteri, a short-form animated series with 6 episodes tells the story of the adventures of five sisters who is a princesses of Limau. The series began to air on TV3 from 20 to 25 November 2014. Puteri earned a Grand Prize at the 2015 ASEAN Character Awards.

Les' Copaque signed a deal with Malaysian satellite TV company, Astro for content sharing, distribution and marketing partnership on 30 October 2018. Under the partnership, all of the studio's animated series like Upin & Ipin and Pada Zaman Dahulu made available to both Astro and NJOI subscribers across the TV and online platforms including on-ground events.

On 18 March 2019, the studio signed a memorandum of understanding (MoU) with the Beijing Animation and Gaming Industry Association (BAGIA) to spearheading a video game and animation partnership.

In 2020, Les' Copaque's YouTube channel garnered 10 million subscribers and awarded the Diamond Play Button Award, making the company the first YouTube channel in Malaysia to gained the mark.

Les' Copaque partnered with American online game developer, Streamline Studios in 2023 to create a console game based on the Upin & Ipin franchise, titled Upin & Ipin Universe. The company invested RM15 million to developed the game, which is an interactive sandbox game with an open-world concept, and features the voice actors of Upin & Ipin. Originally scheduled to be released in September 2024, Upin & Ipin Universe is expected to be released on 17 July 2025 for Nintendo Switch, PlayStation 4, PlayStation 5 and Epic Games.

The company then came up with Dongeng Sang Kancil, which took 2 years to completed. It tells the story about Sang Kancil, an anthropomorphic mousedeer who seeks justice for his mother's death and united with his fellow animals against the Dark Shadow. It became the first Malaysian animated film to utilized both 2D special effect and 3D hybrid technics. The film was released on 26 December 2024 to commercial success.

Les' Copaque celebrates its 20th anniversary on 12 December 2025. To coincide with their anniversary, the company organised the LCXpo 2025 at the World Trade Centre Kuala Lumpur (WTCKL) from 11 to 14 December. At the same time, the company also announced the upcoming Upin & Ipin Theme Park, which was set to opened at the King's Park, Genting Highlands, Pahang. The official opening date for the park was yet to be announced.

== Subsidiaries ==
Les' Copaque Production has seven subsidiaries which operated in different business segments:

- Les' Copaque Games Development (LCGDI) oversees the development of interactive entertainment contents for mobile devices.
- Les' Copaque Animation Academy (LCAA) provides tertiary education for prospect artists and animators and offers a variety of courses in animation industry.
- Les' Copaque Merchandising (LCM; Upin & Ipin Store) handles the production, distribution and licensing of Les' Copaque's merchandises and products.
- Geng's Corner manages restaurants and eateries under the Upin & Ipin Flava brand.
- Les' Copaque Film (LC Film) oversees production of live-action programs, television dramas and movies.
- IU Trading responsible in managing the company's product range.
- LC Training Centre serves as a training skills arm focused on animation and creative industry.

== Filmography ==
=== Films ===
Release date	Title	Notes	Ref.
12 February 2009	Geng: The Adventure Begins	distributed by Grand Brilliance	
1 November 2012	Zaiton: Ceritaku	produced under Les' Copaque Film (then known as Bruang Filem) banner	
24 November 2016	Upin & Ipin: Jeng Jeng Jeng!	co-production with KRU Studios	
21 March 2019	Upin & Ipin: The Lone Gibbon Kris	distributed by Golden Screen Cinemas	
26 December 2024	Dongeng Sang Kancil	released on Netflix globally	

=== Television and web series ===
Year	Title	Network	Notes	Ref.
2007–present	Upin & Ipin	TV9 (2007–2017), Astro Prima and Astro Ceria (2018–present), TV2 (2021–present)		
2011	Kelab Upin & Ipin	TV9	produced under Les' Copaque Film (then known as Bruang Filem) banner	
2011–present	Pada Zaman Dahulu	TV Alhijrah; Astro Ceria		
2014	Puteri	TV3		
2017	DaDuDiDo	YouTube	produced exclusively on Les' Copaque's YouTube channel	
2018	Kembara Warisan Detektif Upin & Ipin	YouTube	produced exclusively on Les' Copaque's YouTube channel	
2019	Upin & Ipin Iqra'	Astro Ceria		
2020	Upin & Ipin: The Helping Heroes	Netflix		
2020	Maaf Zahir Batin Tak Jadi	TV Okey	produced under Les' Copaque Film banner	
2021	Makcik Bawang	TV1	produced under Les' Copaque Film banner	
2023	Jiwa Tanpa Jiwa	TV2	produced under Les' Copaque Film banner	

== Awards and accolades ==
Year	Award-giving body	Category	Recipient	Result	Ref.
2018	The ONE Awards 2018	Special Talent Entrepreneur	Les' Copaque Production	Won	
2019	International Islamic Leadership Forum & Awards 2019	Excellence in Content Animation	Les' Copaque Production	Won	
2024	Star Outstanding Business Awards 2024	Best Brand	Les' Copaque Production	Won	
