= Ernie Zakri =

Malaysian singer

- عرني ذکري
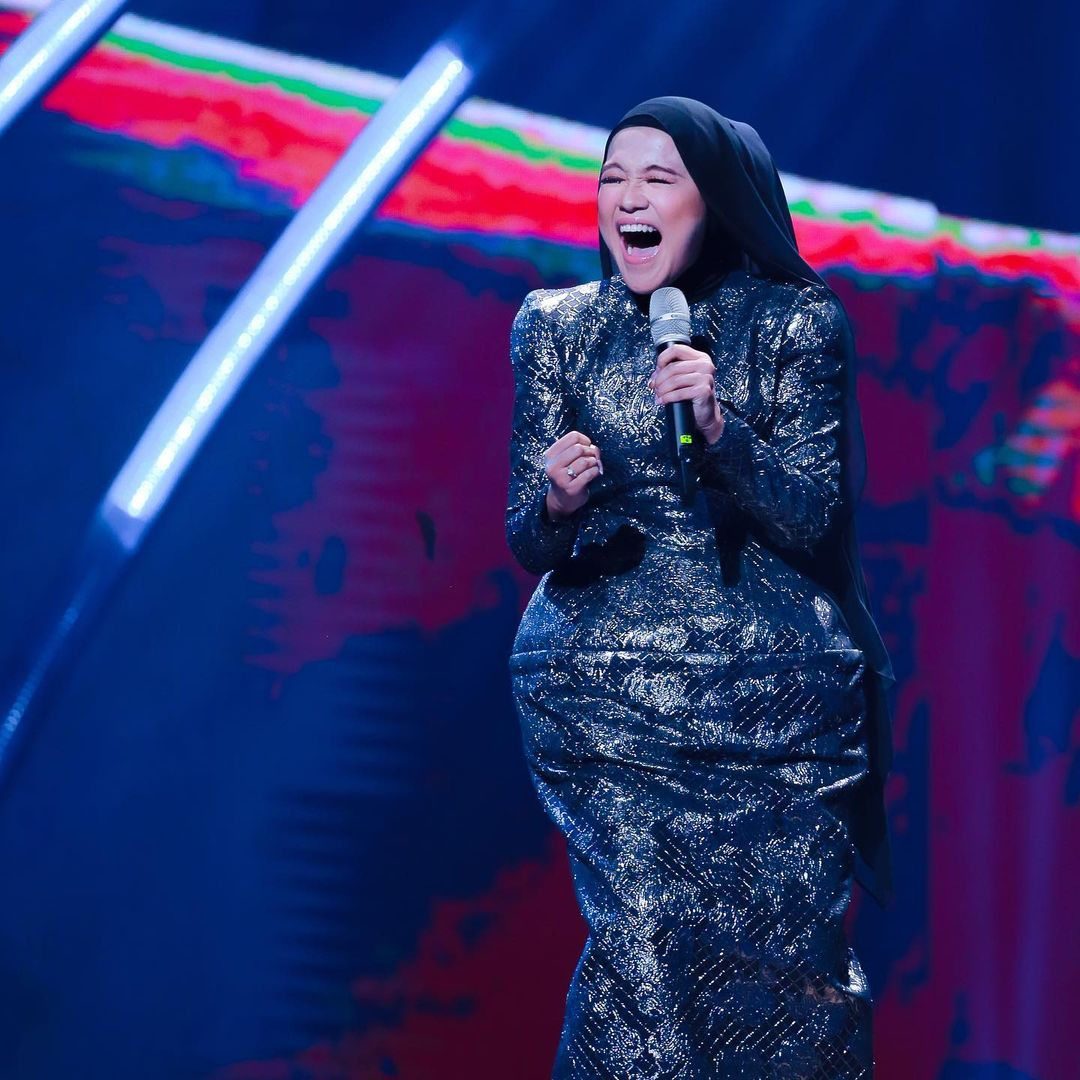
- Ernie Zakri Malaysian singer
- Born: Nur Ernie Shahirah binti Zakri; 23 June 1992 (age 34); Kuala Lumpur, Malaysia
- Education: Universiti Teknologi MARA Shah Alam, University of Malaya
- Occupations: Singer; actress; vocal teacher
- Years active: 2009–present
- Spouse: Syamel Aqmal Mohd Fodzly (m. 2021)
- Children: 1
- Parents: Zakri Ahmad (father); Rafiaah Mohamed (mother)
- Relatives: Ziana Zain (aunt); Anuar Zain (uncle)
- Musical career
- Genres: Pop, classical & R&B
- Instrument: Vocals
- Labels: FMC Music (Malaysia); Rocketfuel Entertainment; Universal Music Malaysia

Nur Ernie Shahirah binti Zakri (born 23 June 1992) is a Malaysian singer, an actress and a vocal teacher. She rose to fame after winning the national singing competition Bintang RTM in 2009. She won the Best Vocals award at the Anugerah Juara Lagu (AJL 32) in 2018 alongside her duet partner, Syamel Fodzly. She spent two years teaching music at the Bentley Music Academy in Mutiara Damansara, Petaling Jaya.

== Early life ==
Ernie was born in Kuala Lumpur, Malaysia, to Rafiaah Mohamed and Zakri Ahmad, a drummer. Through her mother, she is the niece to singers Ziana Zain and Anuar Zain.

She attended SMK (P) Methodist, Kuala Lumpur before earning her degree in Music from Universiti Teknologi MARA Shah Alam. She also holds a master's degree in Music from University of Malaya.

== Vocal profile ==
- Voice type: lyrical soprano
- Full vocal range: D3 - C6 - F6 - C♯7
- Supported range: G3 - G5 - C#6
- Consistent supported range: G3 - F5 - C6

== Career ==
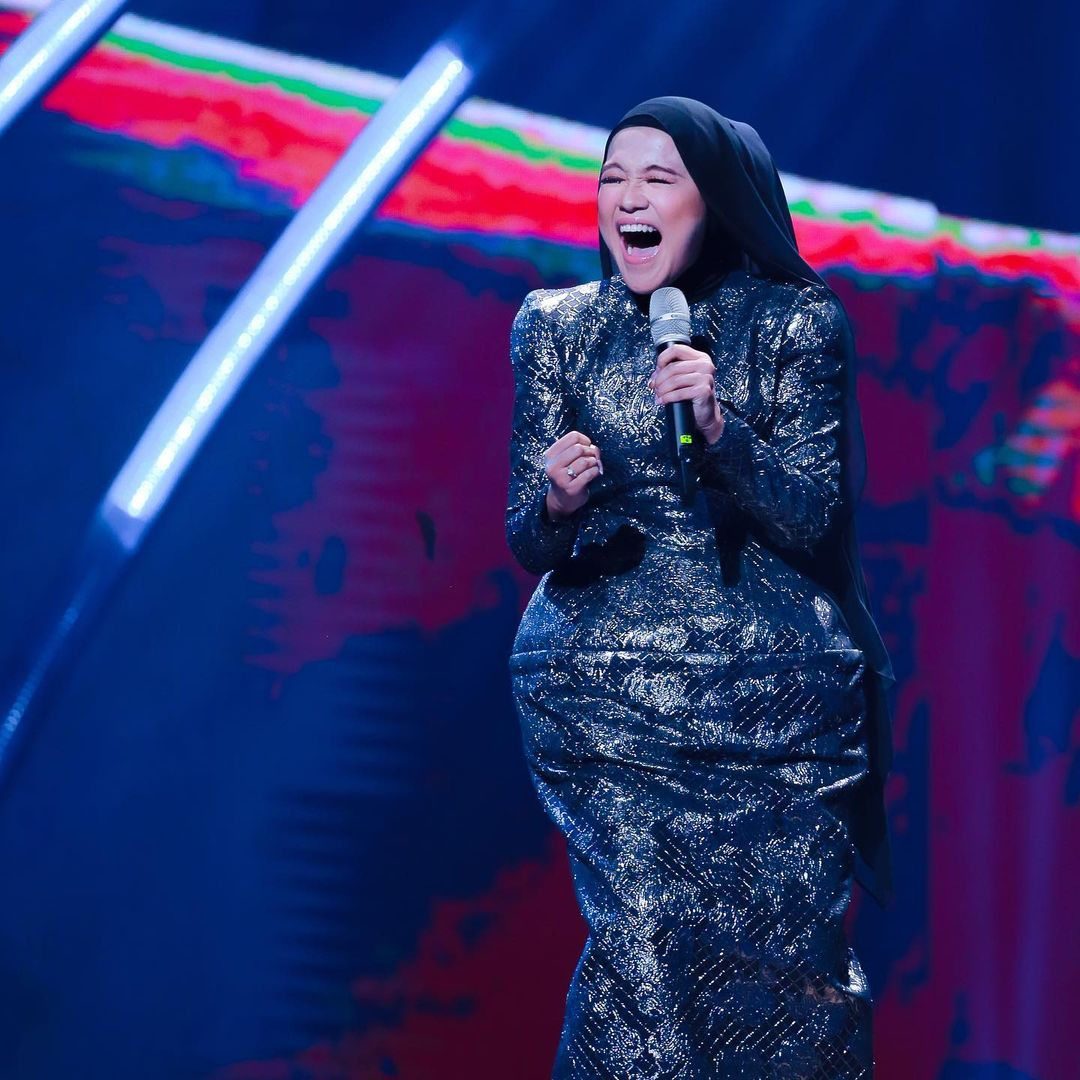
Ernie Zakri at the 35th Anugerah Juara Lagu

At 17, Ernie joined the search for Bintang RTM 2009 and eventually became the youngest winner of the national competition. During the finale, she performed two songs; "Cahaya" and "Kau Yang Teristimewa". In 2011, she released her debut album Sinaran under FMC Music. She released two singles from the album, "Mahu Ingin Bercinta" and "Rindu Bukan Teman". Despite the effort, she failed to gained attention from local music lovers.

In 2017, Ernie alongside her duet partner Syamel Fodzly competed in a reality TV singing competition, Duo Star. The duo bested other contestants with their rendition of Dato' Sri Siti Nurhaliza's "Balqis" and Dato' Jamal Abdillah's "Kau Lupa Pada Janji". Upon winning the competition, Zakri and Syamel released their first duet single, "Aku Cinta". Their popularity, through Duo Star proved to be the breakthrough for Zakri after being in the industry since 2009. In 2018, "Aku Cinta" advanced into the finals of Anugerah Juara Lagu and the duo were awarded with Best Vocals. Later in 2018, she released her single, "Ku Bersuara".

Following the success of their partnership, the duo released their second duet single, "Takkan Terlerai" in April 2019. She also was chosen to be the voice of Bawang Merah and Bawang Putih in animated film, Upin & Ipin: Keris Siamang Tunggal. Zakri ventured into acting with her debut in television series, Suri Katriana which was aired on Astro Prima. In November 2019, her single "Ku Bersuara" was selected to be the finalists at the 34th Anugerah Juara Lagu. In 2020 her song entitled "Gundah" make the way once again to compete in the final for Anugerah Juara Lagu 35.On 14 March 2021, due to pandemic COVID-19, Anugerah Juara Lagu 35 was held without audiences. She managed to grab The Best Vocal award for AJL 35, making it as her second winning for Best Vocal award after the previous 32nd edition. She was called Queen of Vocal Malaysia and Ariana Grande Malaysia

== Personal life ==
Ernie married fellow singer Syameel Aqmal Mohd Fodzly on 22 March 2021 at Puncak Alam Mosque, Selangor. The couple was blessed with a daughter named Nur Khawla Soleha who was born on 22 February 2022.

== Discography ==
=== Studio albums ===
- Sinaran (2011)
- Aura (2023)

=== Singles ===
As lead artist

Year	Title	Album	Notes
2011	"Mahu Ingin Bercinta"	Sinaran	
2011	"Rindu Bukan Teman"	Sinaran	
2012	"Khalimah Janji"	Single	
2015	"Takkan Pudar"	Single	
2015	"Ini Yang Ku Mahu"	Single	
2016	"Jangan Marah"	Single	
2018	"Misteri"	Single	
2018	"Ku Bersuara"	Single	
2019	"Buai Laju-Laju"	Upin & Ipin: Keris Siamang Tunggal	Original soundtrack
2019	“Anak Kecil Main Api”	Teater Pawana Isabella	Show track
2019	“Phoenix Bangkit Dari Abu”	Teater Pawana Isabella	Show track
2020	"Gundah"	Single	Co-written by herself and Sharon Paul
2020	"Boneka"	Single	
2021	"Sinar Mata Hati"	Single	Suri Katriana theme song
2022	"Korban"	Single	TBA
2022	"Astana"	Single	TBA
2023	"Suasana Hari Raya"	Single	
2023	"Jemput Raya"	Single	
2023	"Sirna"	Single	Sumpahan Jerunei theme song
2023	"The Best"	Single	
2024	"HAHAHAHAHari Raya"	Single	
2025	"Nostalgia"	Single	

As duet

Year	Title	Duet with	Album	Notes
2017	"Aku Cinta"	Syamel Fodzly	Non-album single	Winner of Best Vocals at the 32nd Anugerah Juara Lagu
2019	"Takkan Terlerai"	Syamel Fodzly	Non-album single	
2019	"Seru Hari Lebaran"	Syamel Fodzly	Non-album single	Released in conjunction with Hari Raya Aidilfitri celebration
2021	"Goodbye Hello"	Syamel Fodzly	Non-album single	Wedding song
2021	"Berakhirlah Pencarianku"	Hafiz Suip	Non-album single	
2022	"Hal Hebat"	Govinda	Non-album single	
2023	"Ayuh"	Malique, Kmy Kmo, Aman RA	Non-album single	Polis Evo 3 theme song
2023	"Sampai Tua"	Syamel Fodzly	Non-album single	
2024	"LUV"	Sabronzo	Non-album single	

== Filmography ==
=== Film ===
Year	Title	Role	Notes
2019	Upin & Ipin: Keris Siamang Tunggal	Bawang Merah & Bawang Putih	Voice role

=== Television series ===
Year	Title	Role	TV channel	Notes
2019	Suri Katriana	Suri	Astro Prima	First acting venture
2021	Kalau Dah Berbini	Siti	Astro Warna	
2024	Luka Cinta	Herself	SCTV	First debut in Indonesia, special appearance

=== Television shows ===
Year	Title	Notes	Channel
2009	Bintang RTM	Champion	TV2
2016	Duo Star	Champion (with Syamel)	Astro Ria
2018	Big Stage	Vocal trainer	Astro Ria
2019	Mentor Milenia	Mentor	TV3
2019	J.K.K (Season 5)	Mira, special appearance in Episode 7: "Kampung Contoh"	TV3
2020	Ceria Megastar (Season 2)	Judge	Astro Ceria
2021	Shuk Nak Tanya 2	Guest Artist	Awesome TV
2021	Havoc Nak Raya	Guest Artist	TV3
2022	Sepahtu Reunion Live	Episode: "Tolong Jagakan Dia"	Astro Warna
2023	Konsert Minggu Ini	Episode: "Syamel dan Ernie"	TV2
2023	TVS LIVE	Episode: "Ernie Zakri dan Huza Tahir"	TVS

== Awards and nominations ==
Year	Award	Category	Nominated work	Result	Ref.
2018	32nd Anugerah Juara Lagu	Best Vocals	"Aku Cinta" (with Syamel)	Won	
2018	31st Anugerah Bintang Popular Berita Harian	Favourite Collaboration/ Duo/ Group	Herself (with Syamel)	Won	
2020	34th Anugerah Juara Lagu	-	"Ku Bersuara"	Finalist	
2020	Anugerah MeleTOP ERA	MeleTOP ERA Singer	Herself (for "Ku Bersuara")	Nominated	
2020	33rd Anugerah Bintang Popular Berita Harian	Popular Female Singer	Herself	Nominated	
2021	35th Anugerah Juara Lagu	Best Vocals	"Gundah"	Won	
2021	34th Anugerah Bintang Popular Berita Harian	Popular Female Singer	Herself	Nominated	
2022	36th Anugerah Juara Lagu	-	"Boneka" (replaced by Syamel)	Nominated	
2022	Anugerah MeleTOP ERA	MeleTOP ERA Singer	Herself (for "Gundah" and "Boneka"	Nominated	
2022	Anugerah MeleTOP ERA	MeleTOP Video	MV "Boneka"	Nominated	
2022	23rd Anugerah Industri Muzik	Best Vocal Performance in a Song (Female)	"Sinar Mata Hati"	Won	
2022	23rd Anugerah Industri Muzik	Best Pop Song	"Goodbye Hello" (with Syamel)	Won	
2022	23rd Anugerah Industri Muzik	Best Song (Song of the Year)	"Goodbye Hello" (with Syamel)	Won	
2022	23rd Anugerah Industri Muzik	Best Duo/Collaboration Vocal Performance in a Song	"Goodbye Hello" (with Syamel)	Nominated	
2022	23rd Anugerah Industri Muzik	Best Duo/Collaboration Vocal Performance in a Song	"Berakhirlah Pencarianku (with Hafiz Suip)	Nominated	
2023	37th Anugerah Juara Lagu	-	"Korban"	Finalist	
2023	35th Anugerah Bintang Popular Berita Harian	Popular Female Singer	Herself	Nominated	
2024	38th Anugerah Juara Lagu	-	"Astana"	Finalist	
2024	36th Anugerah Bintang Popular Berita Harian	Most Boom Song	"Masing Masing" (with Govinda)	Won	
2024	SCTV Awards 2024	Best Sinetron Soundtrack	"Masing Masing" (with Govinda)	Won	
2024	ContentAsia Award	Best Original Song for An Asian TV Series/Programme or Movie	"Ayuh" (with Aman RA, Kmy Kmo, Malique)	Won	
2024	33rd Festival Filem Malaysia	Best Theme Song	"Ayuh" (with Aman RA, Kmy Kmo, Malique)	Nominated	
2025	39th Anugerah Juara Lagu	Best Vocals	"Aura"	Won	
2025	Gempak Most Wanted Awards 2024	Best Music Video 2024	"Masing Masing" (with Govinda)	Nominated	
	Anugerah Bintang Popular 2025	Bintang Paling Popular 2025	Penyanyi Wanita Popular 2025	Won	
