= HoopWorld =

2010 video game

HoopWorld
- Developers: Streamline Studios, Virtual Toys
- Publisher: Virtual Toys
- Platform: Wii (WiiWare)
- Release: NA: July 19, 2010; PAL: August 13, 2010
- Genre: Arcade Sports
- Modes: Single player, offline Multiplayer

HoopWorld is a 3-on-3 multiplayer arcade basketball game with a kung-fu power-up twist, released in North America on July 19, 2010 and in the PAL region on August 13, 2010 exclusively for WiiWare. HoopWorld utilizes power-up gameplay, basketball and Kung-fu to create a unique and competitive experience reminiscent of Arch Rivals, NBA Jam, and Power Stone.

== Gameplay ==
HoopWorld employs an exaggerated, over-the-top style, demonstrated by vibrant colors and the player dunking from extreme heights.

HoopWorld is an action sports basketball game in arcade style where two teams fight each other in order to defend their home courts. The point of the game is to get the highest score possible before match time runs out. The player runs, fights, kicks, steals the ball from opponents, and performs dunks and ball passes to win the match. Mystery Boxes will appear randomly on the court during the match revealing one of eight power-ups that impact game play.

The game comes with three game modes (Quick Match, Tournament, and Survival) and has four difficulty levels (easy, normal, difficulty, and crazy) that enable the player to unlock teams and courts when played in Tournament mode. HoopWorld is an offline multiplayer game that can be played with 1-2 players. There is also an online leader board allowing players to upload their accumulated scores generated in Tournament mode. There are six available courts that are set in nature and outdoor locations, such as a jungle, a volcano, a Caribbean island, a Greek village, a desert, and a mystical forest. Each court is defended by its respective team that the player can pick from.

== History ==
HoopWorld was first announced in 2005 for release on XBLA in spring 2006. In September 2006, the game was postponed due to quality and gameplay concerns and Streamline Studios announced engineering support from Spanish developer and publisher Virtual Toys. In 2008, the developers decided to release HoopWorld as a WiiWare title slated for release in 2010. The game launched in North and South America on July 19, 2010, and in Europe, Australia, and New Zealand on August 13, 2010, where it is available for the same amount of 1000 Wii Points under the title HoopWorld BasketBrawl.

Programmer Tommy Refenes of Super Meat Boy fame was a member of the development team.

== Reception ==
Reception

Review scores
Publication	Score
1Up.com	B-
IGN	8/10
Nintendo Life	7/10
Wiiloveit.com	27/30
RunDLC	3/5

HoopWorld has received a variety of reactions from varying media outlets. 1UP cited that the game's controls come with a learning curve, but it does "deliver... its promise of old-school three-on-three fun".

Continuing with the thought of difficulty, RunDLC commented that the AI will make you "scream" at times, but it was still considered to be a "cool new take" on the sport.

Wiiloveit.com praised the game for its "new dimension of gameplay" and "extremely intense" matches. Although the lack of online play was commented on, it was highlighted that the game is "a lot of fun", especially from the standpoint of it being a quality multiplayer game for the service.

IGN mentioned that the control scheme "can take some adjustment" but described HoopWorld overall as one of "the most attractive WiiWare titles" and an "impressive alternative" to the NBA Jam experience that excels beyond nostalgia memories of arcade classics.

== See also ==
- List of WiiWare games
- List of WiiWare games (North America)
