= Pada Zaman Dahulu =

- Genre: Fantasy; Animation; Folklore
- Created by: Zulhilmi Md Rozali; Wong Shi Yuan; Uzair Abdul Rashid; Nor Shamil Anwar; Fazren Mohd Fadrillah; Nur Alissa Azureen Abu Bakar
- Written by: Ainon Ariff; Nur Naquyah Burhanuddin; Nor Aizan Embong
- Directed by: Imran Adzman; Calvin Tony
- Creative director: Nur Naquyah Burhanuddin
- Voices of: Hj. Alias Lazan; Nuraini Nazihah; Amin Rusli; Loke Keng Sun; Hasan Albasri Mohd Kamil; Muiz Rahimi; Fitri Anas; Ahmad Kamel Mahmud; Nini Razali; Puteri Nur Batrischa; Ammar Saif
- Theme music composer: Mohd Azfaren Mohd Aznam
- Opening theme: "Pada Zaman Dahulu"
- Ending theme: "Pada Zaman Dahulu" (instrumental)
- Composer: Mohd Azfaren Mohd Aznam
- Country of origin: Malaysia
- Original language: Malay
- No. of seasons: 6
- No. of episodes: 180

Production
- Executive producer: Tang Ying Sowk
- Producers: Burhanuddin Md Radzi; Ainon Ariff
- Running time: 8 minutes
- Production company: Les' Copaque Production

Original release
- Network: TV Alhijrah; Astro Ceria; Astro Prima
- Release: 3 December 2011 – 11 February 2026

Pada Zaman Dahulu (Note: Also known as Pada Zaman Dahulu: Kancil Yang Bijak ("Once Upon a Time: The Wise Mousedeer") for Season 2 and Pada Zaman Dahulu: Kisah Aris & Ara ("Once Upon a Time: The Aris & Ara's Story") for Season 5 and 6.) (English: Once Upon a Time) is a Malaysian animated fantasy folklore series produced by Les' Copaque Production. First broadcast in 2011 on TV Alhijrah and later on Astro Ceria, the series tells a story of the adventures of two young city kids, Ara and Aris and their grandfather Aki, who told his grandchildren tales that featured kancil, an anthropomorphic mouse-deer popular in Malaysian folklore, and various other anthropomorphic animal characters such as crocodile, buffalo and monkey. The first series consists of 12 episodes of 8 minutes each, with each story covering 3 episodes.

== Characters ==
=== Human characters ===
- Aki – Aris's and Ara's loving grandfather, and the main storyteller.
- Aris – Ara's older brother who loves playing video games, but very responsible in taking care of his younger sister.
- Ara – Aris's younger sister who loves to hear stories from Aki.
- Wan – Aki's wife and grandmother of Aris and Aki. Though she was rarely seen, her voice often heard at the end of each episode with a scenes outside of Aki's house at night.

=== Animal characters ===
- Sang Kancil (The Mousedeer) – The main character in most of Aki's stories. Clever, cunning, and agile, he always finds a way to escape from predators and becomes a judge in the forest to solve problems in the forest. Kancil's ears move because he has a good idea.
- Harimau (The Tiger) – The fierce, evil-hearted and feared 'King of the Jungle' by many. Any prey becomes his favorite food.
- Kerbau (The Buffalo) – The buffalo who longs for the 'King of the Jungle' title, but lacks sharp thinking and is afraid of hunters.
- Buaya (The Crocodile) – Another predatory animal that is feared by many forest dwellers, and loves to be praised excessively. Leading a group of crocodiles that lives in the river.
- Gajah (The Elephant) – Although large, they are very timid. Very friendly and does not like fighting.
- Tupai (The Squirrel) – A martial arts expert who always appears out of nowhere to praise or reprimand other animals, he always mentions proverbs or poems in the stories.
- Arnab (The Rabbit) – Sang Kancil's cute best friend but very easily aroused.
- Gergasi (The Giant) – A giant humanoid creature who likes to terrorize and hunt animals in the forest, big and strong enough that even the Tiger is powerless to fight him.
- Ular (The Snake) – A jungle dweller who is sometimes good, sometimes evil, that is, evil when hungry.
- Monyet (The Monkey) – A jungle dweller who likes to eat bananas and other fruits
- Kura-kura (The Tortoise) – Sang Kancil's friend who is slow, but he is patient and helpful.
- Singa (The Lion) – He is the 'King of the Jungle' replacing the Tiger, he is very handsome, fast and very strong.
- Raja Semut (The Ant King) – The leader of an ant colony that lives near the river, he is very attentive to the people and his obligations.
- Belalang (The Grasshopper) – An animal that likes to sing, entertain, and dance for the animals, he always plays the violin.
- Gagak (The Crow) – A bird that used to be white is now black because the Stork throws dark dye, his heart is very kind and keeps trying.
- Tikus (The Mouse) – A small and cute animal is Sang Kancil's friend. There are two large and shiny teeth for biting which are layered.

== Production ==
Les' Copaque Production's Managing Director, Burhanuddin Md Radzi announced that the company will come up with its second animated TV series, Pada Zaman Dahulu, following the critical and commercial success of Upin & Ipin. The series was inspired by the Malaysian animal folklores. Mohd Haris Amran, Les' Copaque's Head of Animation Concept Artist said that he got the ideas and inspirations for Pada Zaman Dahulu while he visited Zoo Negara. The production team consists of 140 people working on the series, many of whom are Les' Copaque's staffs.

Much like Upin & Ipin, each episodes divided into three parts with running time is seven minutes and took two or three weeks to completed. Mohd Haris described the animation process of each episode as "not easy like drawing". The series using 3D rendering techniques to provide the good shading and is produced in high-definition format. The main and supporting characters as well as additional characters of Pada Zaman Dahulu are voiced by the series' production staffs and are referred to by their first names. The program is announced to premiere on TV Alhijrah, followed by Astro Ceria.

== Episodes ==
Series	Episodes	Originally released		
Series	Episodes	First released	Last released	Network
1	12	3 December 2011	24 December 2011	TV Alhijrah; Astro Ceria
2	24	18 February 2012	8 September 2012	TV Alhijrah; Astro Ceria
3	36	1 June 2013	26 October 2013	TV Alhijrah; Astro Ceria
4	36	4 October 2014	21 December 2014	TV Alhijrah; Astro Ceria
5	36	2 November 2019	18 January 2020	Astro Prima
6	36	14 May 2025	11 February 2026	Astro Ceria

=== Season 1 (2011) ===
No. overall	No. in season	Title	English title	Original release date
1–3	1–3	"Sang Kancil dan Kerbau"	"The Mousedeer and the Buffalo"	December 3, 2011
4–6	4–6	"Sang Kancil Mengira Buaya"	"The Mousedeer Counting the Crocodiles"	December 10, 2011
7–9	7–9	"Sang Kancil dan Perigi Buta"	"The Mousedeer and the Blind Wells"	December 17, 2011
10–12	10–12	"Sang Kancil dan Gergasi"	"The Mousedeer and the Giant"	December 24, 2011

=== Season 2 (2012) ===
No. overall	No. in season	Title	English title	Original release date
13–15	1–3	"Sang Kancil dan Tali Pinggang Hikmat"	"The Mousedeer and the Belt of Wisdom"	February 18, 2012
16–18	4–6	"Sang Kancil dan Pemburu"	"The Mousedeer and the Hunter"	February 25, 2012
19–21	7–9	"Sang Kancil Berlumba Dengan Siput"	"The Mousedeer Racing With the Snails"	March 3, 2012
22–24	10–12	"Sang Kancil dan Harimau"	"The Mousedeer and the Tiger"	March 17, 2012
25–27	13–15	"Sang Kancil dan Gong Raja Sulaiman"	"The Mousedeer and the King Sulaiman's Gong"	May 19, 2012
28–30	16–18	"Sang Kancil Menjadi Hakim"	"The Mousedeer Becomes the Judge"	June 2, 2012
31–33	19–21	"Kura-kura dan Monyet"	"The Tortoise and the Monkey"	September 1, 2012
34–36	22–24	"Penghuni Hutan Menentang Gergasi"	"Jungle Dwellers Fighting the Giants"	September 8, 2012

=== Season 3 (2013) ===
No. overall	No. in season	Title	English title	Original release date
37–39	1–3	"Sang Kancil dan Singa"	"The Mousedeer and the Lion"	June 1, 2013
40–42	4–6	"Ayam dan Helang"	"The Chicken and the Eagle"	June 8, 2013
43–45	7–9	"Pekasam Mata Harimau"	"Tiger's Eye Pickle"	June 15, 2013
46–48	10–12	"Semut, Merpati dan Gajah"	"The Ant, the Pigeon and the Elephant"	June 22, 2013
49–51	13–15	"Musang dan Ayam"	"The Fox and the Chicken"	June 29, 2013
52–54	16–18	"Belalang dan Semut"	"The Grasshopper and the Ant"	July 28, 2013
55–57	19–21	"Kisah Bangau"	"Stork Stories"	August 5, 2013
58–60	22–24	"Anjing dan Bayang-Bayang"	"The Dogs and the Shadows"	September 7, 2013
61–63	25–27	"Kambing dan Buaya"	"The Goats and the Crocodiles"	October 12, 2013
64–66	28–30	"Cawi dan Harimau"	"The Racket-Tailed Drongo and the Tiger"	October 19, 2013
67–69	31–33	"Kura-Kura dan Itik"	"The Tortoise and the Duck"	October 26, 2013
70–72	34–36	"Singa dan Tikus"	"The Lion and the Rat"	November 2, 2013

=== Season 4 (2014) ===
No. overall	No. in season	Title	English title	Original release date
73–75	1–3	"Monyet Raja Rimba"	"Monkeys the King of the Jungle"	October 4, 2014
76–78	4–6	"Jangan Berkawan Dengan Kera"	"Don't Befriends With the Monkeys"	October 11, 2014
79–81	7–9	"Sang Kancil dan Serigala"	"The Mousedeer and the Wolf"	October 18, 2014
82–84	10–12	"Sereban Tidak Sebulu"	"The Featherless Chicken"	October 25, 2014
85–87	13–15	"Tempua Bersarang Rendah"	"The Low Nesting Weavers"	November 2, 2014
88–90	16–18	"Gagak dan Kendi"	"The Crow and the Pitcher"	November 9, 2014
91–93	19–21	"Puyuh dan Tempua"	"The Quails and the Weavers"	November 16, 2014
94–96	22–24	"Monyet Yang Nakal"	"The Naughty Monkeys"	November 23, 2014
97–99	25–27	"Kisah Duri Landak"	"The Hedgehog Spines Story"	November 30, 2014
100–102	28–30	"Kenapa Kerengga Pinggang Ramping"	"Why Is the Weaver Ants So Slim"	December 7, 2014
103–105	31–33	"Makan Telur Busuk"	"Eating Stale Eggs"	December 14, 2014
106–108	34–36	"Kawan Biar Seribu"	"Let's Make Friends"	December 21, 2014

=== Season 5 (2019–2020) ===
No. overall	No. in season	Title	English title	Original release date
109–111	1–3	"Katak Bawah Tempurung"	"The Frog Under the Coconut Shell"	November 2, 2019
112–114	4–6	"Ayam dan Semut"	"The Chicken and the Ant"	November 9, 2019
115–117	7–9	"Kenapa Bangau Kurus?"	"Why the Stork Are Thin?"	November 16, 2019
118–120	10–12	"Hadiah Duri Landak"	"Hedgehog Spines' Prizes"	November 23, 2019
121–123	13–15	"Ayam Jantan dan Merpati"	"The Male Chicken and the Pigeons"	November 30, 2019
124–126	16–18	"Rusa dan Tanduknya"	"The Deer and its Horn"	December 7, 2019
127–129	19–21	"Beruang dan Lebah"	"The Bear and the Bees"	December 14, 2019
130–132	22–24	"Kucing dan Harimau"	"The Cat and the Tiger"	December 21, 2019
133–135	25–27	"Musang Yang Bodoh Sombong"	"The Arrogant Fox"	December 28, 2019
136–138	28–30	"Kenapa Kelelawar Keluar Malam"	"Why are the bats nocturnal"	January 4, 2020
139–141	31–33	"Bagaimana Siput dapat Cengkerang"	"How the Snail got their Shells"	January 11, 2020
142–144	34–36	"Singa dan Serigala"	"The Lion and the Wolf"	January 18, 2020

=== Season 6 (2025–2026) ===
No. overall	No. in season	Title	English title	Original release date
145–147	1–3	"Tikus Desa dan Tikus Bandar"	"The Countryside Rat and the City Rat"	May 14, 2025
148–150	4–6	"Sang Gagak dan Merak"	"The Crow and the Peacock"	May 21, 2025
151–153	7–9	"Burung Hantu dan Belalang"	"The Owl and the Grasshopper"	May 28, 2025
154–156	10–12	"Semut dan Rama-Rama"	"The Ant and the Butterfly"	June 4, 2025
157–159	13–15	"Kucing dan Tikus"	"The Cat and the Mouse"	June 25, 2025
160–162	16–18	"Mengapa Ular Sawa Tidak Berbisa?"	"Why the Pythons Are Non-Venomous?"	August 25, 2025
163–165	19–21	"Kuda dan Keldai"	"The Horse and the Donkey"	September 3, 2025
166–168	22–24	"Kucing Menjadi Hakim"	"The Cat Becomes the Judge"	October 7, 2025
169–171	25–27	"Bagaimana Gajah Mendapat Gading"	"How the Elephants Get Ivory"	October 25, 2025
172–174	28–30	"Arnab dan Katak"	"The Rabbit and the Frog"	November 10, 2025
175–177	31–33	"Bangau dan Ketam"	"The Stork and the Crab"	January 6, 2026
178–180	34–36	"Helang Yang Setia"	"The Faithful Eagle"	February 11, 2026

== Broadcast ==
The first video for Pada Zaman Dahulu was first released on Les' Copaque's YouTube channel on 31 March 2011, followed by the second video released on 14 October 2011.

The series began premiered on TV Alhijrah from 3 December 2011 to 21 December 2014 for 4 seasons. The series later aired on Astro Ceria from May 2012. It later shifted to Astro Prima for the fifth season starting 2 November 2019.

== Awards and nominations ==
Award	Year	Recipient(s) and nominee(s)	Category	Result	Ref.
Anugerah Bintang Popular Berita Harian	2021	Pada Zaman Dahulu	Popular Animated Character	Nominated	
Indonesian Broadcasting Commission Awards	2016	Pada Zaman Dahulu	Best Foreign Animation Program	Won	
