= Dongeng Sang Kancil =

- Theatrical release poster
- Directed by: Ahmad Razuri Roseli; Nik Ahmad Rasyidi Nik Othman
- Written by: Ainon Ariff; Nur Naquyah Burhanuddin; Nor Aizan Embong; Nur Shahilla Jesni
- Produced by: Burhanuddin Md Radzi; Ainon Ariff
- Starring: Nini Razali; Amir Masdi; Dinda Dania
- Production company: Les' Copaque Production
- Distributed by: Astro Shaw (theaters); Netflix (international)
- Release date: 26 December 2024
- Running time: 99 minutes
- Country: Malaysia
- Language: Malay
- Box office: RM8.3 million

Dongeng Sang Kancil (The Tale of Sang Kancil) is a 2024 Malaysian animated musical adventure film produced by Les' Copaque Production and Astro Shaw. The film was directed by Ahmad Razuri Roseli and Nik Ahmad Rasyidi Nik Othman with a screenplay by Ainon Ariff and Nur Naquyah Burhanuddin. The film was released on 26 December 2024 in Malaysia.

== Plot ==
The film begins with a mother mouse deer getting chased by an unknown figure (Harimau Kumbang) before reaching her son, Sang Kancil. She pushes her son off a cliff to inevitably save him and sacrificing herself to the dark shadow.

Following the death of his mother, Sang Kancil grows up to be a celebrated figure in the forest. With the first act of the movie beginning with the forest animals that included Arnab begging for his help with stopping a greedy elephant named Gajah Belukar from taking over their pond. After defeating the elephant with Ratu Semut, the ant queen, Sang Kancil is celebrated once again by the animals. With Sang Kancil returning to his home, Tupai meets him and advises him not to be too arrogant and the film shows their dynamic together.

When Sang Kancil heard a voice above him, Gagak, the creepy eccentric crow, beckoning him to follow him deep into the forest.

== Voice cast ==
Data taken from the IMDB website.

- Nini Razali as Sang Kancil
- Amir Masdi as Harimau Kumbang
- Dinda Dania as Arnab
- Loke Keng Sun as Tupai
- Muhammad Hafiz Bin Hassan as Helang Perkasa
- Fadzrian Ildzan Fadzian as Gajah
- Ahmad Razuri bin Roseli as Raja Buaya
- Mohamad Zaki Bin Ishak as Monyet
- Khairul Mu'az Kamarul Ariffin as Gagak
- Rufaidah Bt Mohamed Fadzil as Kancil's Mom
- Nur Shazlin Kamaruddin as Ratu Semut
- Anira Haris as Ular Sawa
- Muhammad Shamer Bin Hj Nazli as Harimau
- Suleiman Bakti Bin Azlan as Orang Utan

== Production ==
The film is Les' Copaque's fourth animated feature film. It became the first Malaysian animated film to utilise both 2D hybrid and 3D special effects.

== Soundtrack ==
Dongeng Sang Kancil (Original Motion Picture Soundtrack)

Soundtrack album by Various Artists
- Released: 12 November 2024
- Genre: Soundtrack
- Length: 19:47
- Language: Malay
- Label: Les' Copaque Production

The film's soundtrack was released on November 12, 2024, on all audio streaming platforms.

No.	Title	Artist(s)	Length
1.	"Dongeng Sang Kancil"	Yubi, Fadzrian Ildzan	2:56
2.	"Penghuni Hutan"	Ahmad Zakri Tomirin	0:45
3.	"Hoo La Hey"	Dinda Dania	2:32
4.	"Gigit Jatuh"	Ahmad Zakri Tomirin	0:28
5.	"Nasib Buaya"	Nini Razali, Ahmad Razuri	1:34
6.	"Tolonglah Kancil"	Asyraf Munap	0:44
7.	"Bayang Hitam"	Amir Masdi	2:56
8.	"Semoga Berjaya Sahabatku"	Asyraf Munap	0:47
9.	"Dikir Harimau Kumbang"	Amir Masdi	3:48
10.	"Dongeng Sang Kancil" (Remix)	Yubi, Nini Razali, Dinda Dania	3:08
Total length:			19:47

== Release and reception ==
Dongeng Sang Kancil was released in Malaysian cinemas on 26 December 2024. The film began to be available for streaming on Netflix starting 26 March 2025.
