= MIMOS =

Malaysian Institute of Microelectronic Systems

MIMOS Berhad
- Type: State-owned enterprise
- Founded: 17 October 1984
- Headquarters: Technology Park Malaysia, 57000 Kuala Lumpur, Malaysia
- Key people: Dr. Saat Shukri Embong, Acting President & Group Chief Executive Officer (GCEO)
- Products: Frontier technology platforms
- Parent: Minister of Finance Incorporated (MoF Inc.)
- Website: www.mimos.my

MIMOS Berhad (or MIMOS) is Malaysia's national applied research and development centre under the Ministry of Science, Technology And Innovation (MOSTI). It is a public company wholly owned by Minister of Finance Incorporated (MoF Inc.).

MIMOS began as a unit of the Prime Minister's Department in early 1985, under the name Malaysian Institute of Microelectronic Systems, aimed to increase the skill and knowledge of Malaysian engineers and scientists and support the creation of "new electronic-based industries".

MIMOS is a strategic agency under the Ministry of Science, Technology and Innovation (MOSTI) and an innovation centre in Semiconductors, Microelectronics, and ICT technologies. Since its inception, MIMOS has filed over 2,000 patents in various technology domains and across key socio-economic areas.

MIMOS oversees R&D Centres focusing on Semiconductors & Thin Film Research, Embedded Systems, and Technologies for Manufacturing and Smart Nations.

1997 MIMOS commissioned Malaysia's first wafer fabrication plant (Fab 1) for R&D and small-scale production of 1.0 micrometre digital CMOS technology, 6-inch (152 mm) wafer, 600 wafers per month.

It fabricated Malaysia's first locally designed Integrated Circuit (IC), 16-bit RISC & microprocessor Pesona, in May 1997.

== Milestones ==
History of MIMOS: In the early 1980s, a group of academics led by Dr. Tengku Mohd Azzman Shariffadeen, Dean of the Faculty of Engineering at the University of Malaya, held discussions and realised that although Malaysia was a leading exporter of electrical and electronic products, none of the product designs, brands, or marketing belonged to Malaysian companies.

Informal discussions involving Dr. Mohd Azzman (University of Malaya), Dr. Mohamed Awang Lah (University of Malaya), Dr. Muhammad Ghazie Ismail (Universiti Sains Malaysia), Dr. Mohd Arif Nun (Universiti Teknologi Malaysia), and Dr. Mohd Zawawi Ismail (Universiti Kebangsaan Malaysia) led to the recognition of Malaysia’s need for an institute dedicated to microelectronics research to support this industry and to develop original products.

In August 1984, a concept paper on the formation of a Microelectronics R&D Institute was presented to the Prime Minister. The purpose of the Institute was to provide critical infrastructure to advance the local electronics industry so that the country could design, manufacture, and market high-quality electronic products through local capabilities, due to the significance of industrial and economic growth. The proposal for the formation of the Institute was presented to and approved by the Cabinet on October 17, 1984. MIMOS Timeline

1985: On 1 January, the Malaysian Institute of Microelectronic Systems (MIMOS) officially began operations as a unit under the Prime Minister’s Department. The Institute actively commenced its activities in May, operated initially by five senior officers and operating out of a bungalow located on Jalan Kolam Air, Jalan Sultan Ismail, Kuala Lumpur.

1987: The Institute introduced the Internet to Malaysia by managing the RangKom project (Malaysia Computer Network). During this period, MIMOS also presented a Memorandum of Establishment to transform the Institute into a government-owned company under the Prime Minister’s Office.

1989: MIMOS collaborated with the Ministry of Education on the development and introduction of the Education Integrated Computer into the national curriculum. This initiative led to the creation of COMIL, Malaysia’s first educational tool, designed to assist teachers in developing learning materials in the Malay language.

1990: On 20 March, the Chief Secretary confirmed that the proposal to convert MIMOS into a company could not be considered at that time. In August, the Institute submitted a memorandum regarding the Restructuring of MIMOS’ Organisational Structure. In November, MIMOS was officially shifted as a department under the Ministry of Science, Technology and the Environment (MOSTE).

1991: The RangKom project transitioned into an Internet Service Provider (ISP), offering services to a limited number of members.

1992: MIMOS launched Malaysia’s first Internet Service Provider, JARING.

1994: MIMOS was appointed as the Secretariat to the National IT Council (NITC), chaired by the Prime Minister. Dr. Tengku Mohd Azzman, Director General of MIMOS, was appointed as the Permanent Secretary. Through the NITC, MIMOS played a key role in developing the framework for the Multimedia Super Corridor (MSC) Malaysia. Construction of the MIMOS Complex commenced at Technology Park Malaysia, Bukit Jalil. It also introduced Malaysia’s first locally designed integrated circuit (IC), the 16-bit RISC microprocessor, known as Pesona.

1995: Construction of the MIMOS Complex in Bukit Jalil was completed after 88 weeks. MIMOS also began hosting technology seminars, starting with Mikroelektronik Malaysia 95.

1996: In November, MIMOS Berhad was incorporated as a company under the Ministry of Finance (MoF) with three core functions – R&D, National IT Policy Development, and Business Development. MIMOS relocated from Dataran Commerce, Jalan Semantan, Kuala Lumpur, to Technology Park Malaysia. It initiated and organised two major ICT events in Malaysia: Asia Multimedia (MMA) and INFOTECH. These events were widely attended by government and industry leaders. MMA served as a platform for global ICT dialogue, while INFOTECH (later renamed INFOSOC) was a national forum to discuss the effectiveness of strategic ICT initiatives.

1997: In May 1997, MIMOS designed the first locally developed IC, the 16-bit RISC Pesona microprocessor. It also became the first in Asia to install a 45 Mbit/s T3 line, providing faster internet access for JARING users. The Malaysia Computer Emergency Response Team (MyCERT) was established as a reference point for the local internet community in addressing computer security issues. 1997–2002 During this period, eleven business units, subsidiaries, and associate companies were established.

1998: Launched the “Execute with Excellence” program, aimed at enhancing performance and optimising resource utilisation. The rationalisation of specific projects led to the commercialisation of R&D trial outputs and the formation of business units, subsidiaries, and joint venture companies (1998–2003). MIMOS established a joint venture company, DIGICERT Sdn Bhd, as Malaysia’s first Certification Authority (CA) to issue digital certificates. It also formed a wholly owned subsidiary, MIMOS Smart Computing Sdn Bhd, to manufacture and supply modern, reliable, and affordable personal computers and related hardware.

1999: MIMOS launched iVEST (Virtual Environment for Secure Transactions), an end-to-end platform for secure net-based communication and commerce. It also deployed the world’s first fully IP-based network backbone in Malaysia, SuperJARING, operating at 2.5 Gbit/s, spanning from Penang to Johor Bahru.

2000: Launched Cikgu.net, a dedicated portal for educators, in March 2000. It was powered by iGalaksi, a portal engine developed by MIMOS. MIMOS' business unit, JARING, began offering high-quality VoIP services with call rates 80% lower than conventional telephone charges. MIMOS became the first Malaysian organisation to participate in the registration of Internet Protocol Version 6 (IPv6). In April, OICnetworks Sdn Bhd, a joint venture between MIMOS and the Islamic Development Bank in Jeddah, was established as an exchange platform among global networks to contribute to the socio-economic development of OIC member countries. Encipta Ltd, a wholly owned subsidiary, was incorporated on 8 December 2000 as a venture capital company.

2001: MIMOS initiated and commenced its Computer Forensics Services under the 8th Malaysia Plan. NISER (National ICT Security and Emergency Response Centre) was officially launched by the Deputy Prime Minister. On 21 February, CIDB EConstruct Services Sdn Bhd was established as a joint venture company between the Construction Industry Development Board (CIDB) and MIMOS Berhad to enhance the competitiveness of the Malaysian construction industry.

2002: MIMOS was specialised as an industry-grade wafer fabrication plant (Fab 2), with 0.5-micrometre CMOS digital technology, 8-inch (200 mm) wafers, and a capacity of 3,000 wafers per month. JARING became the first ISP in Malaysia to offer IP-VPN connectivity. My-MS, a MIMOS subsidiary, launched Malaysia’s first 0.35-micrometre EEPROM chip (Electronically Erasable Programmable Read-Only Memory). MIMOS acquired a 33.3% equity stake in TIGER Consortium Sdn Bhd.

2003: The role of the NITC Secretariat was officially transferred to the Ministry of Energy, Communications and Multimedia (KTKM). MIMOS was directed to focus on R&D activities, with its business operations to be gradually separated from its corporate structure. Titian Digital, a project under the Bridging the Digital Divide (BDD) programme, successfully launched its first test site in Kampung Pamah Kulat, Pahang. It provided rural communities with various MIMOS-developed "digital divide bridges." iVEST offered Internet Security solutions for MyKad PKI applications. A comprehensive presentation titled "Protecting e-National Sovereignty" was delivered to the then Prime Minister, Tun Dr Mahathir Mohamad, and senior government officials on 27 October.

2004: MIMOS strengthened its R&D activities. As business remained part of the corporate structure, it continued to be developed for monetisation. The AgriBazaar platform was launched by the Prime Minister. 2005 The MyGfL pilot project was launched in April. Subsequently, MIMOS developed Malaysia's first cryptographic protocol.

2006: Datuk Abdul Wahab Abdullah was appointed as President and Chief Executive Officer on 1 July 2006, with the vision of transforming MIMOS into a premier applied research centre in technology. To this end, MIMOS undertook research in technologies aimed at developing local industries to compete globally, with the goal of moving Malaysia up the value chain and ensuring accelerated economic growth.

2006–2010: Strategic disposal of equity interests in CIDB subsidiary companies, including eConstruct Services, iVEST, MIMOS Smart Computing, Tiger Consortium, DigiCert, Encipta, and Malaysia Microelectronics Solution.

2007: Achieved Capability Maturity Model Integration (CMMI) Maturity Level 3. Launched "Makcik PC", a prototype mobile computer.

2008: Launched Jen-ii, a desktop PC derived from the Makcik PC. Launched the first generation of iDOLA mobile computers.

2009: Launched the MIMOS WiWi technology platform. Introduced Advanced Data Analytics and Modelling (ADAM) to MIMOS' Core Technology Areas. Achieved CMMI Maturity Level 5.

2010: Marketed the second generation of iDOLA netbooks. Received its first two registered patents, followed by four additional patents. Concluded the year with the successful creation of an innovation-driven business market funnel worth RM1.092 billion for commercialisation by Malaysian companies, surpassing the RM1 billion target.

2011: MIMOS celebrated its 25th anniversary with a year-long celebration, including a main event attended by former Prime Minister, Tun Dr. Mahathir, the Minister of MOSTI, and the MIMOS Pioneer Management Team. Achieved People Capability Maturity Model (P-CMM) Maturity Level 3, becoming the only organisation in Malaysia and the region (excluding China) to operate at this level. MIMOS Reliability Lab was accredited with MS ISO/IEC 17025:2005 under the national laboratory accreditation scheme (SAMM) by the Department of Standards Malaysia. Micro-energy and Psychometrics were added to MIMOS' Core Technology Areas. Became the top Malaysian patent applicant under the Patent Cooperation Treaty (PCT).

== See also ==
- Grid fabric
