= Upin & Ipin: Jeng Jeng Jeng! =

- Malaysian theatrical poster
- Directed by: Ainon Ariff; Erma Fatima
- Based on: Upin & Ipin; Animated series by Burhanuddin Md Radzi & Ainon Ariff
- Produced by: Les' Copaque Production; KRU Studios; MNC Pictures
- Starring: Asyiela Putri Azhar; Puteri Balqis Azizi; Awie; Sara Ali; Remy Ishak; Gambit Saifullah
- Distributed by: Primeworks Distribution iflix
- Release date: 24 November 2016
- Running time: 97 minutes
- Country: Malaysia
- Language: Malay
- Budget: MYR 4 million
- Box office: MYR 4.8 million

Upin & Ipin: Jeng Jeng Jeng! is a 2016 Malaysian Malay-language live-action animated film directed by Ainon Ariff and Eirma Fatima starring Asyiela Putri Azhar, Puteri Balqis Azizi, Awie, Sara Ali, Remy Ishak and Gambit Saifullah as the main antagonist in this film. The film is produced by Les' Copaque Production in partnership with KRU Studios and released in Malaysian cinemas beginning 24 November 2016.

== Plot ==
Based on the hugely popular Upin & Ipin TV series, it sees the five-year-old twins interact with human actors, and tells the story of their diehard fan, a young orphan named Aqish, who imagines them being real. Aqish discovers that the owner of the land on which her orphanage is built has returned to claim it back, and she enlists the help of Upin and Ipin to save the day.

== Cast ==
- Asyiela Putri Azhar (voice) as Upin & Ipin
- Puteri Balqis Azizi as Aqish
- Awie as Awie (himself)
- Sara Ali as Noreen
- Remy Ishak as Bo
- Gambit Saifullah as Zaman
- David Teo as Lavid

== Production ==
Les’ Copaque managing director, Burhanuddin Md Radzi said that the idea to produce live-action film based on this popular animation came across since 2013. The film was shot and completed in the same year but was not released due to many technical issues. Returning from a much loss of that film production, the studio continued to make progress and a new film was shot in October 2014. Taking one month to complete, he was satisfied with the result and hoped it will be well received by the audience.

== Reception ==
Days of screening	Cumulative sales
1 day (24 November)	RM 500,000 (USD 120,000)
2 days (25 November)	
3 days (26 November)	
4 days (27 November)	RM 3 million (USD 600,000)
