= Burhanuddin Md Radzi =

Malaysian businessman and producer

- Born: 4 September 1956 (age 70)
- Other name: Atok Ranggi
- Education: Bachelor's Degree in Engineering (Petroleum and Natural Gas)
- Alma mater: Universiti Teknologi Malaysia (UTM); Bandung Institute of Technology (ITB)
- Occupations: Entrepreneur; producer; voice actor
- Employer: Les' Copaque Production
- Notable work: Upin & Ipin; Pada Zaman Dahulu; Geng: The Adventure Begins
- Spouse: Ainon Ariff
- Children: 4

Burhanuddin Md Radzi (born 4 September 1956) is a Malaysian entrepreneur, producer and voice actor. He is the co-founder of Les' Copaque Production, a Shah Alam-based animation studio, best known for Upin & Ipin (2007–present), Pada Zaman Dahulu (2011–present) and Geng: The Adventure Begins (2009).

== Career ==
Prior to his Les' Copaque stint, Burhanuddin used to work for Petronas. While in Petronas, he became the Petroleum Engineer at the Petronas Carigali in Miri, Sarawak. In 1990, he received the President's Award and afterwards, appointed as Head of Operations Production until 1992. After leaving Petronas, Burhanuddin joined Dayang Enterprise in 1994 and become its Managing Director until 2004 when he resigned from the company and sold his shares.

He and his wife, Ainon Ariff venture into animation industry and co-founded Les' Copaque Production in December 2005. Burhanuddin says that the company name was inspired by Malay phrase, "last kopek", which means "last chance". The company's first release is Upin & Ipin, an animated series about the eponymous twin brothers. The series, which was launched in 2007, quickly found global critical and commercial success as it expanded to air in several countries, including Indonesia, Brunei, United Kingdom and Australia.

In 2009, Les' Copaque's first feature film Geng: The Adventure Begins was released and collected RM 6.2 million, making it one of the highest-grossing Malaysian films in history. Burhanuddin provide his voice for the bus driver and also become financier.

Exploring the storytelling of animal folklore, Burhanuddin began developing Pada Zaman Dahulu in 2011. The series is a collection of famous local animal folklore told in a style different from Upin & Ipin. The series began aired on TV Alhijrah, and later on Astro Ceria.

Three years later, Burhanuddin created a short-form series Puteri. It tells the story of the adventures of five sisters princesses of Limau. The series earned a Grand Prize at the 2015 ASEAN Character Awards.

Expanding further the Upin & Ipin franchise, Burhanuddin produced the franchise's second film, Upin & Ipin: Jeng Jeng Jeng! which took 2 years to completed. Co-produced by his company Les' Copaque and KRU Studios, he also made his acting debut in the film by took his role as Awie's producer. The film was released on 24 November 2016 and receive positive reviews.

Upin & Ipin's third film, Upin & Ipin: The Lone Gibbon Kris was released three years later, on 21 March 2019. The film saws Burhanuddin and most of the series' voice actors reprise their respective roles. With the production budget costing RM20 million, it became the most expensive animated film ever made by Burhanuddin and his company.

== Personal life ==
Burhanuddin attended the Bandung Institute of Technology (ITB) in Bandung, West Java, Indonesia, but didn't finished his studies there. He then return to Malaysia and pursue studying at the Universiti Teknologi Malaysia (UTM) and graduated with Bachelor's Degree in Engineering (Petroleum and Natural Gas) in 1982.

He is married to Ainon Ariff. They have 4 children. His daughter, Nur Naquyah serves as a Director of Les' Copaque's subsidiary, LC Merchandising and as a creative director of Upin & Ipin.

== Filmography ==
Year	Title	Creator	Director	Writer	Producer	Voice/acting role(s)	Note(s)
2007–present	Upin & Ipin	Yes	No	Yes	Yes	Tok Dalang	Season 4–present
2009	Geng: The Adventure Begins	Yes	No	No	Yes	Bus driver	Also as executive producer and financier
2011–2025	Pada Zaman Dahulu	No	No	No	Yes		
2012	Zaiton: Ceritaku	No	No	No	Yes		
2014	Puteri	No	No	No	Yes		
2015	Usop Wilcha Meghonjang Makhluk Muzium	No	No	No	Executive		
2016	Upin & Ipin: Jeng Jeng Jeng!	Yes	No	No	Yes	Awie's producer	
2017	DaDuDiDo	No	No	No	Yes		
2019	Upin & Ipin: Iqra'	Yes	No	No	Yes		
2019	Upin & Ipin: The Lone Gibbon Kris	Yes	No	No	Yes	Tok Dalang	Also as executive producer
2020	Upin & Ipin: The Helping Heroes	Yes	No	No	Yes		
2024	Dongeng Sang Kancil	Yes	No	No	Yes		

== Awards and nominations ==
Year	Award-giving body	Category	Result	Ref.
2024	ASEAN Best Choice Animated Industry Award	ASEAN Best Choice Award	Won	
