= Streamline Studios =

Video game development and art outsourcing company

Streamline Studios (Streamline Media Group, Inc.)
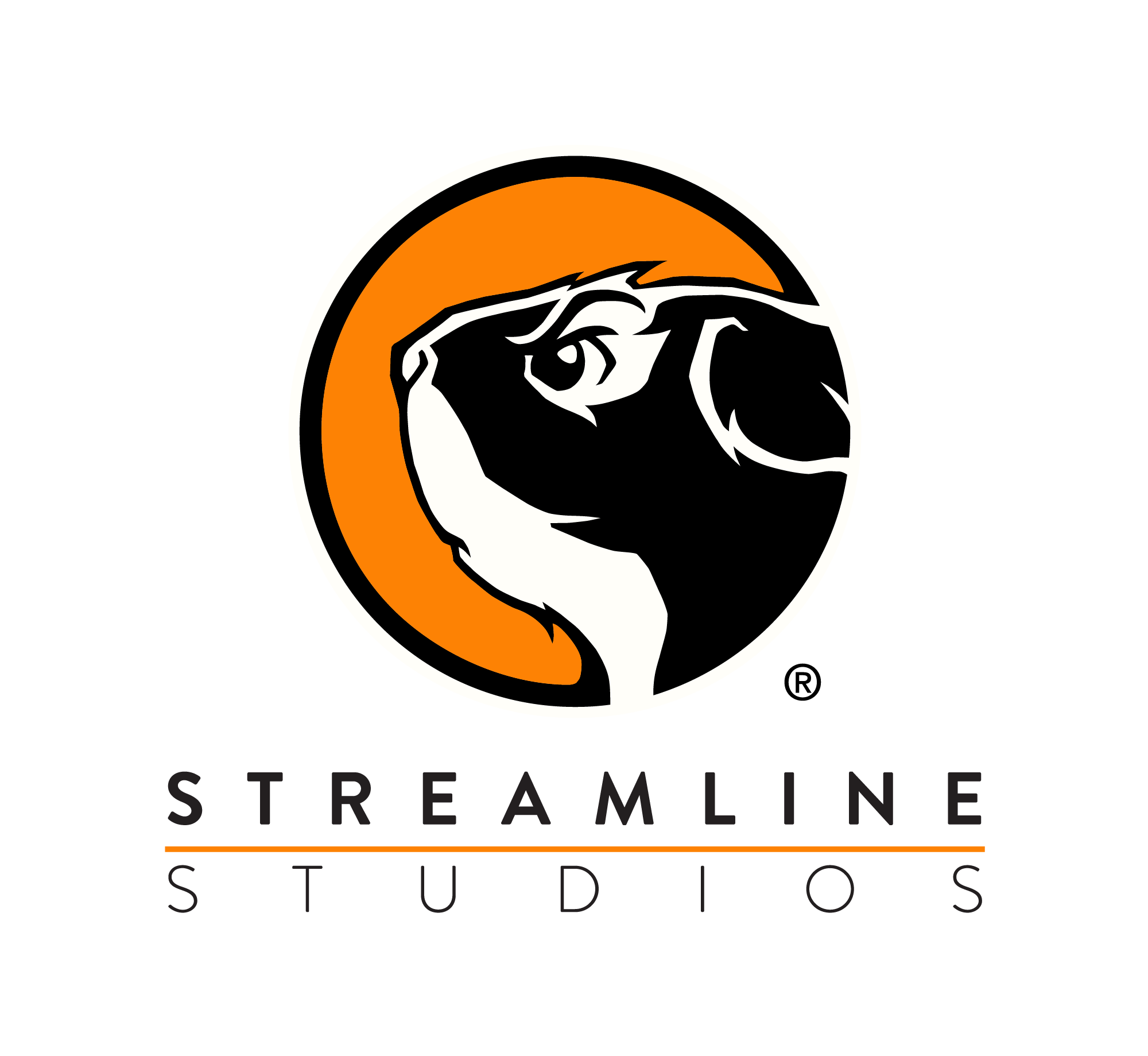
- Type: Private
- Industry: Art outsourcing, Software & programming, Game development
- Founded: Hilversum, Netherlands (2001)
- Headquarters: HQ: Las Vegas, USA Development Studio:Kuala Lumpur, Malaysia
- Key people: Alexander L. Fernandez, Stefan Baier, Renier Banninga, Jeroen Leurs, Bo Jensen
- Products: Streamframe, HoopWorld, Axon Runners
- Number of employees: 200

Streamline Studios, founded in 2001, is a global creative and technology company for video games and beyond. Their partners include Capcom, Microsoft, Coca-Cola, Square Enix, BBC Sport, and Balenciaga. GenVid Technologies, Epic Games, Unity3D, and 2K Games.

== History ==
streamline was founded in 2001 in Hilversum, The Netherlands, by four young, passionate gamers with a gift for modding and developing original games; Alexander Fernandez, Stefan Baier, Adrian Banninga and Renier Banninga. They sold their art and game development skills as a creative and technical outsourcing vendor to fund that passion. From there, they developed relationships with AAA developers and publishers and sought out like-minded people to partner with.

Stefan Baier, Adrian Banninga and Renier Banninga met during their stint at Rewolf Software, working on the Half-Life mod, Gunman Chronicles. When Rewolf Software dissolved, Baier and the Banninga brothers moved to The Netherlands, where they formed the company with Alexander Fernandez. In 2005 the company moved to Amsterdam where they operated for a few years, before moving to New York, US. In 2010, Streamline made the move to open in Southeast Asia, an emerging market for video game development and gamers.

In 2021, Streamline announced its expansion of game development and services to its US-based headquarters in Las Vegas, NV.

This expansion plan supports the growth of multiple lines of business including Streamframe, its proprietary game development platform and diverse digital offerings centered around the metaverse and enterprise gaming in the Americas.

== Games ==
Streamline Studios has development relationships with franchises, games, and brands including:

- Street Fighter V
- Final Fantasy XV
- Monster of the Deep: Final Fantasy XV
- Oddworld: Soulstorm
- Outriders
- Afterworld: The Age of Tomorrow
- SpongeBob SquarePants: Battle for Bikini Bottom - Rehydrated
- Altspace VR
- BioShock Infinite
- Pillars of Eternity
- Unreal Tournament
- Marvel vs. Capcom Infinite
- Death Stranding
- Killer Instinct
- Gears of War

== Intellectual Properties ==
=== HoopWorld ===
HoopWorld is Streamline Studios first original IP and was released in July 2010 on WiiWare in North and South America. In August that year the game was also released in Europe, Australia and New Zealand under the title, HoopWorld BasketBrawl.

=== Axon Runners ===
In 2012, Axon Runners was developed in partnership with Streamline Studios and the Coca-Cola Content Factory for the iOS.
