= Geng: The Adventure Begins =

- Malaysian theatrical release poster
- Malay: Geng: Pengembaraan Bermula
- Directed by: Nizam Razak
- Screenplay by: Muhammad Anas Abdul Aziz; Ehsan Azharuddin
- Story by: Nizam Razak; Muhammad Anas Abdul Aziz; Ainon Ariff
- Based on: Upin & Ipin by Burhanuddin Md Radzi; Ainon Ariff
- Produced by: Burhanuddin Md Radzi; Ainon Ariff
- Starring: Nur Fathiah Diaz; Amir Izwan; Balqis Fadhullah Lim; Kannan Rajan; Kee Yong Pin
- Cinematography: Nazrul Hadi Nazlan
- Edited by: Nizam Razak; Usamah Zaid Yasin; Kee Yong Pin; Faiz Hanafiah (uncredited)
- Music by: Mohamed Azfaren Aznam; Yuri Wong
- Animation by: Usamah Zaid Yasin (director); Nazrul Hadi Nazlan (supervisor); Yap Ee Jean; Dzubir Zakaria; Loke Keng Sun; Choy Seng Kee; Asyraf Rahman; Shafiq Isa; Nazmi Yatim; Hasan Albasri
- Production company: Les' Copaque Production
- Distributed by: Grand Brilliance; MNC Pictures
- Release date: 12 February 2009
- Running time: 95 minutes
- Country: Malaysia
- Language: Malay
- Budget: MYR 4 Million
- Box office: MYR 6.3 million

Geng: The Adventure Begins (Malay: Geng: Pengembaraan Bermula, originally Geng: Misteri Hantu Durian) is a 2009 Malaysian Malay-language 3D animated adventure comedy film. Based on the characters created by Les' Copaque Production, the film was directed by Nizam Razak from the screenplay of his friend, Anas Abdul Aziz and Ehsan Azharuddin and story by Nizam, Anas and Ainon Ariff who served as producer.

The film released in Malaysian cinemas beginning 12 February 2009. Geng was launched in a ceremony held on 11 September 2007 together with short animated series Upin & Ipin that have connections with the film. Planning for the film began in late-2005 as Les Copaque commenced operations. It received financial support from ICT-related agencies such as Multimedia Development Corporation and MIMOS.

== Plot ==
The film begins with Badrol and Lim watching the news covering about the sudden disappearance of durians in Badrol's home village, Kampung Durian Runtuh. A news reporter interviews Badrol's grandfather, Mr. Senin Bin Khamis, also known by the villagers as Tok Dalang, about the previous night when a durian fell but something managed to eat it and leave the durians shell clean. Tok Dalang and the locals dub the "something" a durian ghost since it is unknown of who or what is eating the durians late at night. Badrol gets skeptical and decides to go to the village, taking Lim along with him.

After riding on a bus which gets its tire punctured, the two are forced to walk to the village which is 5 km away. After a few complaints from Lim, a truck driver named Mr. Singh noticed the two and decided to give them a ride much to his friend and boss Pak Mail's chagrin. Badrol then tells them about their journey with Pak Mail talking about an abandoned house.

At the village Upin and Ipin are playing in Uncle Muthu's outdoor restaurant while Sally is impatiently waiting for his pastries, Mak Uda, called Opah by Upin and Ipin's as she is their grandmother, arrives. Sally then nonchalantly spelling his name S-I-L-L-Y (Silly). The twins greet Opah who tells them to come home with their older sister Ros. Opah then asks Sally to see if he has finished making her clothing and ushers to fix it as Sally tells Opah that he couldn't finish sewing the clothes simply because the buttons keep popping out and is ruining his nails. After Sally complaints about Opah, Opah then asks Ah Tong, about the news of the durian ghost, but Ah Tong claims the durian ghost to be unreal, Opah claims Ah Tong that he 'never believes in anything'. Sally left as he lost his appetite. As Singh and Pak Mail drops Badrol and Lim on the shop the two then decided to ask Muthu for directions to Tok Dalang's house since Badrol hasn't been in the village for a while and he does not remember the way to his house but due to Muthu's unclear directions, he decided to ask Upin and Ipin to lead Badrol and Lim instead while Kak Ros drops by to deliver the pastries but decided to follow her brothers as she is forced by Uncle Muthu. Unbeknownst to the villagers, Salleh then meet Uncle Singh and Pak Mail at the abandoned house.

Upon arriving at Tok Dalang's (called by Atok) house and having a reunion, Badrol and Lim took Atok's suggestions which is to explore the village, Badrol and Lim then have a motorcycle race, knocking out a child named Rajoo, who forces the two to replace his radio (when Rajoo sees the two heading towards him he jumped into the water with the radio) and his one-horned cow Sapy into the water. Badrol and Lim are telling him that they going home to Tok Dalang's house.

At night, Tok Dalang talks about the Durian Ghost, after which Badrol and Lim sleep, with Lim wanting to go to the bathroom. The next day, they go to Tok Dalang's durian orchard with Rajoo's wagon, with an impromptu musical number ensuing. The kids, along with Badrol and Lim, then arrived at Tok Dalang´s orchard. After Upin, Ipin and Rajoo ride a leaf, they find a fox-like creature named Oopet. Kak Ros, Badrol and Lim find them and at night, they go camping, which then Lim has to go to the bathroom again. They continued wandering through the woods, not knowing they already got lost when suddenly, a monster chased them and captured them both. The same monster then chases Ros, Upin, Ipin and Rajoo and Oopet. They go to a cave, where they get chased by a snake monster and attacked by large leeches. Tok Dalang, Opah, Muthu and Ah Tong then go to the orchard to find them. The children then found a plateu with fireflies, and Oopet tells them his story. It is then revealed to have been the one who ate the durians. Oopet then tells the children to find his mother. Suddenly, they heard a scream, it was then revealed as Badrol and Lim who got kidnapped by the monster (revealed to be Uncle Singh) to the cabin. Rajoo then sneaks to the cabin that Uncle Singh and Pak Mail, along with Salleh have some plans for haunting the orchard He threw a rock, which hits the large cage where a large animal is in. Through various tricks, they manage to save Badrol and Lim and escape the cabin. Oopet tries to help his mother but Pak Mail catches him and threw him against the cage. Fueled by rage, Opet´s Mother then destroys the cage and the cabin before attacking the hunters for wanting to kidnap her son. They escaped, but his mother is chasing them. As the hunters ran into the cave, the snake monster cornered them and they now stuck between the monster and Opet´s mother. The children catch up with them, and Oopet tells them to run while Oopet's mother is fighting the snake monster. Pak Mail and Singh then escaped through the portal during the conflict. Though gravely wounded, Opet´s mother managed to kill the snake monster and save the children. After which they tearfully say farewell to Oopet and his mother.

Tok Dalang, Opah, and Muthu then found Upin, Ipin, Badrol, Lim and Rajoo, with them the accusing Salleh of following Mr. Singh's and Pak Mail's plans. Lim hands Rajoo his CD player and calls him, along with Upin, Ipin, Badrol and Kak Ros part of a "gang". In a mid-credits scene, Mail and Singh roaming in Oopet's world, they found a similar creature like Opet and plan to sell it again, only for them getting chased and attacked by its mother.

== Cast ==
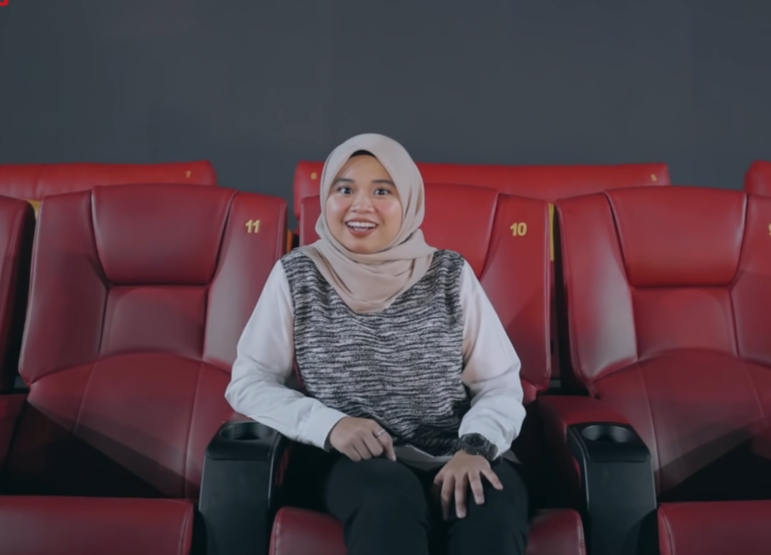
Nur Fathiah Diaz (pictured in 2019 for BoBoiBoy Movie 2 promo by TGV Cinemas) as Upin and Ipin.

- Nur Fathiah Diaz as Upin and Ipin
- Amir Izwan Abdul Rahim as Badrol
- Kee Yong Pin as Lim
- Ida Rahayu Yusoff as Oopet and mystic voice
- Shafiq Isa as Uncle Muthu, Singh and mystic voice
- Abu Shafian Abd Hamid as Grandpa Dalang
- Ainon Ariff as Opah (grandmother)
- Rajab Abdul Rahman as Ah Tong
- Ros Hasrol Ahmad as Brother Salleh
- Kannan Rajan as Rajoo
- Balqis Fadhullah Lim as Sister Ros
- Anas Abdul Aziz as Sapy, Rembo, Atan, Baby Oopet and mystic voice
- Safrizan Mohd Razali as Zarien Farein and mystic voice
- Tan Sheik Wei as Lucy
- Ehsan Azharuddin as poacher tofu
- Burhanuddin Md Radzi as Bus Driver
- Azfaren Aznam as mystic voice

== Production ==
It took two years, RM 4.7 million and 40 local animators to complete Geng, which director Mohd Nizam Abdul Razak compares as cheap against Western animation budgets worth "around RM15 million to RM40 million" and "about 130 to 150 animators". He said, "Even though it doesn't cost as much as western animated films, the animated film Geng still has its advantage in terms of mixing elements of horror, thriller (suspense), drama and comedy, all of which can be felt through good sound effects and voices. The support of local audiences is very much needed "Because this film was produced with the creativity of young Indonesian employees. Through this animated film, we hope that this film can attract the interest of more investors to finance the production costs of local animated films in the future."

Les'Copaque Production's managing director, Burhanuddin Md Radzi, told that planning the film began when Mohd Nizam, Muhammad Usamah Zaid and Mohd Safwan Ab Karim met him to read out their plan. In terms of cost-saving, he said that the computers were bought from Low Yat Plaza with modifications of their own, besides financial and logistic support from MDeC, MIMOS Bhd and MOSTI". Maya and MentalRay were employed as the main 3D animation software. Nizam added that supply from Mimos worth millions of ringgit allowed Les' Copaque to perform rendering in only six to eight months compared to the usual over-one-year period, as well as saving costs.

Geng was completed in August 2008 at 108 minutes, and was previewed to invited guests from MDeC, FINAS, Mimos, RTM, Media Prima, Astro and the press. It had been shortened to 90 minutes on the advice of FINAS to please the cinema operators. Les' Copaque was also busy completing the Upin & Ipin shorts for television which somewhat disrupted post-production of Geng. Les' Copaque prepared five original Geng reels, three of which were sent to Kantana Group in Bangkok, Thailand for audio mixing. The first reel repatriated from Kantana provided only rough audio processing, and was taken to the Film Censorship Board to be checked for content. At the end of November 2008, Les' Copaque announced the Censorship Board's approval of their film without cuts and permission to screen by FINAS. The music for Geng is mainly composed by Yuri Wong, who also composed music for the related animated series Upin & Ipin, along with Mohamed Azfaren Aznam, who contributed music as a second composer.

== Reception ==
Les' Copaque has been reported to place targets ranging from RM5 million to RM10 million, and even RM100 million after considering international distribution plans. Geng opened on 12 February 2009 to incredible public response and rave reviews. On its first week in Malaysian cinemas, it gained RM2.3 million at the box office. As of 1 April, it was confirmed that Geng had amassed RM 6,314,526 of ticket sales throughout its seven weeks on Malaysian silver screens, in a rare event in which a Malaysian film has single-handedly defeated an array of major foreign releases, which at that time included Oscar nominees Slumdog Millionaire and The Curious Case of Benjamin Button.

=== Box office chronology ===
Days of screening	Cumulative sales
4 days (15 February)	RM 1.75 million (US$485,000)
7 days (18 February)	RM2.3 million (US$630,000)
11 days (22 February)	RM3.7 million (US$1 million)
14 days (25 February)	RM 4.09 million (US$1.12 million)
18 days (1 March)	RM4.8 million (US$1.3 million)
26 days (9 March)	RM 5.72 million (US$1.55 million)
35 days (18 March)	RM 6.011 million (US$1.632 million)
39 days (22 March)	RM 6.24 million (US$1.65million)
43 days (26 March)	RM 6.28 million (US$1.67 million)
49 days (1 April)	RM 6.31 million (US$1.73 million)

== Awards ==
2009

- International Film Festival for Children, Indonesia
  - Anugerah Pilihan Penonton (People's Choice Awards)
- 22nd Malaysian Film Festival
  - 2 Jury's Choice Awards (box office, animated feature film with distinctive characters)
- MSC Malaysia Kre8tif! Industry Awards
  - Best Editor (Mohd Faiz Hanafiah)
  - Best Music/Score (Yuri Wong)
