= Malaysian Tamil cinema =

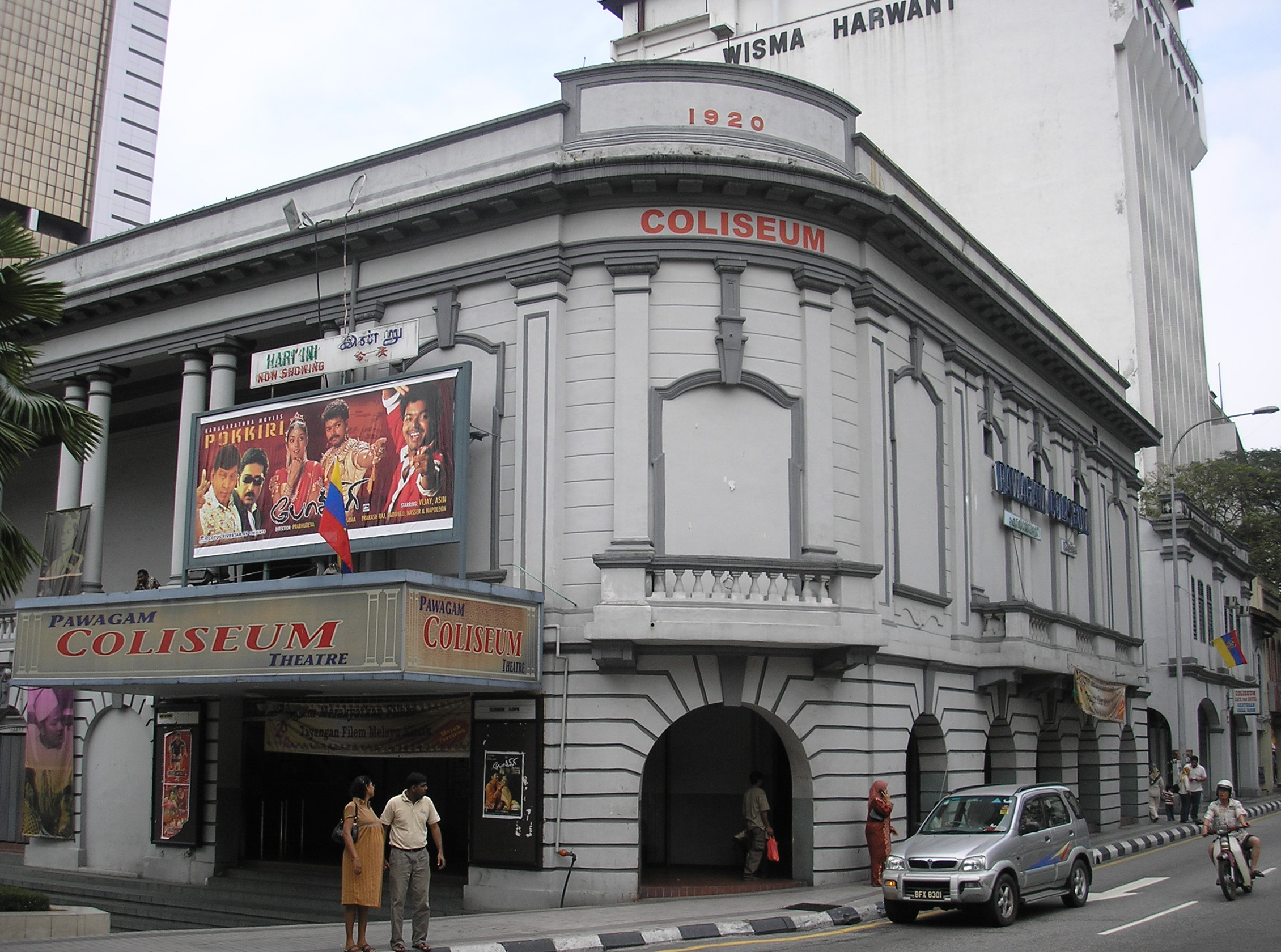
- Coliseum Theatre (Kuala Lumpur)
- No. of screens: 639 (2011)
  - Per capita: 2.4 per 100,000 (2011)
- Main distributors: Lotus Five Star AV; Astro Shaw; Tayangan Unggul Sdn Bhd

Produced feature films (2009)
- Fictional: 26
- Animated: 1
- Documentary: –

Number of admissions (2011)
- Total: 59,500,000
- National films: 13,130,000 (22.1%)

Gross box office (2011)
- Total: MYR 602 million
- National films: MYR 125 million (20.7%)

The making of local Tamil-language films is actively growing in Malaysia with many filmmakers wanting to make their mark.

Malaysia's first Tamil film is known to be Ratha Paei, starring Kalaikkumar Chinnasamy, Susheela Devi, Sivaji Raja, M. Baharudeen, Mukesh, Jaya Gowri and Malaysia Vasudevan. It was shot in Golden Studio, Chennai and directed by Mooban. Music and background score of the film was composed by G. K. Venkatesh. Shooting of the film began in 1968 and it was released on 14 January 1969.

Centered in Kuala Lumpur, Penang and Johor Bahru, the industry remained relatively small with fewer films produced. The industry is growing and faces strong competition from Tamil films from Indian Tamil cinema.

== Highest-grossing movies ==
*	Denotes films still running in cinemas

Highest-grossing Tamil language Malaysian films
Rank	Movie	Year	Studio	Net gross (RM)
1	C4 Cinta	2024	Scifilm Sdn Bhd	2,500,500
2	Veera Karrupu	2026	Kash Villanz Productions, Sai Nanthini Movie World	1,773,941
3	Vedigundu Pasangge	2018	Veedu Production	1,330,219
4	Maindhan	2014	Astro Shaw	903,550
5	Poochandi	2022	Trium Studio	800,000
6	Kaathe Ille Pathukalam	2024	Havoc Film Production	619,479
7	Appalam	2011	Astro Shaw	590,707
8	Mayangaathey	2016	Touchtronics Entertainment, Shaibha Vision	554,816
9	Venpa	2019	Vadai Productions	542,686
10	Geethaiyin Raadhai	2016	Vikadakavi Production	529,162
11	Adai Mazhai Kaalam	2023	Scifilm Sdn Bhd	517,106
12	Pulanaivu	2019	Story Films, Shaibha Vision	512,048
13	Oru Kadha Sollattaa Sir	2024	Kash Villanz Productions	385,751
14	Poovellam Kettuppar	2026	Shaiba Vission Enterprise	341,600
15	Vetti Pasanga	2014	Veedu Production	339,036
16	Thirudathey Papa Thirudathey	2018	Story Films Sdn. Bhd.	322,400
17	Neeyum Naanum	2018	BGW Studios	307,956
18	Tamil School Pasanga	2025	Veedu Production	288,200
19	Vennira Iravuggal	2014	Shine Entertainment	260,353
20	Irumbuth Thottam	2026	AVLT	237,900
21	Kali Muni Tharisanam	2019	AT Movie	236,806
22	Jagat	2015	Skyzen Studios	224,370.43
23	Vere Vazhi Ille	2015	Veedu Production	220,208.39

== List of Tamil films from Malaysia by year ==
Below is a list of Tamil language films produced in Malaysia. The total grosses of the films are in Ringgit Malaysia, and the source is FINAS. This list consists mostly of theatrical releases alongside a few telefilms.

=== 2026 ===
Opening	Title	Studio	Director	Cast	Genre	Ref.
5 Mar	Veera Karrupu	Kash Villanz Productions, Sai Nanthini Movie World	Thanesh Perrabu	Kash Villanz, Viknes Perrabu, Rupini Krishnan, Khesshikah, Turbogaana	Drama / Thriller	
7 May	Sattendru Maarudhu Vaanilai	Filmoholic Pictures	Kevin William	Kevin William, Kshirja Govind, Ranya Sandra, Vinosha Ganasan, Ashwini Nambiar, Sivakumar Palakrishnan, Viknesh RS, Nivashini Ravi, Habib Noor, Ashwanth Abraham	Drama	
TBA	Irumbuth Thottam	AVLT Production	Jaydev Jayakumar	Irfan Zaini, Yuneswaran Ramaraj, Logavarman Stideran, Marie Dashani Matthews, Mohana Raj, Dhurgaashini S Vijyan, Vino Shan, Vijay Naidu	Crime Thriller	
27 August	Poovellaam Kettuppaar PKP	Shaibha Vision, SciFilm	Karthik Shaamalan	Datin Sri Shaila V, Magen Vikadakavi, Yuvaraj Krishnasamy, Thashrra Aghonderan, “Kalai Maamanu” KS Maniam, CS Murugan, Noorul Haq, Veronica Thomas, Thaneswari Rajenthiran	Adventure / Thriller	
12 November	My Dear Ex	Arima Pictures	AK Shakthivell	Kuben Mahadevan, Punitah Shanmugam, Thia Lakshana	Drama / Comedy / Romance	

=== 2025 ===
Opening	Title	Studio	Director	Cast	Genre	Ref.
23 Jan	Tamil School Pasanga	Veedu Production	K. Shunmugam	Denes Kumar, Vidia Liana, Kuben Mahadevan, Ben-G, Malarvili, Veerasingam, Yasmin Nadiah, David Anthon	Comedy / Drama	
20 Feb	Simple Manusan	Veedu Production	Haran Kaveri and Shobaan	Hindravel Chandrabose, Mogan Chandra Das, Shamini Ramasamy, Braima Sivagnanam, Ravi Shanker, Arumugam Vellasamy, Gogularaajan Rajendran, Theva Nayagi	Comedy / Romance	
27 Feb	Karuppiah Perumal	Uyire Media, Poketplay	BenG	Aghonderan Sahadevan, BenG, Sasitharan, K Rajoo, Hemaji, Sathisvaran, Tresa Lazaroo	Comedy / Thriller	
20 Mar	Hero Friend-U	Dove Eye	Martin R. Chantheran	Thevaguru Suppiah, Kavitha, Shabby, Celina Jay, Ravin Rao, Dhilip Kumar	Comedy / Romance	
17 Apr	Sight & Sound In Love	Janu Talkies	Sandosh Kesavan	Arun Kumaran, Rupini Krishnan, Shamini Shradha, Dev JBC, Navinkumar Kannadasan	Musical	
15 May	Suttaa Thale Enakku	Sai Nanthini Movie World	Thanesh Perrabu	Viknes Perrabu, Samuel Sam, Jee Kutty, Nirmala Tharmarajan, Katiravan, Mogan, Govin, Shamaaraj, Risheekesan, Pavitran, Balan Santinathan, Gopal, Dnesh	Action / Comedy	
19 Jun	Mirugasirisham	Fivestar AV	Vijay Ganesh	Vijay Ganesh, Joshua Shashi Kumar, Jegan Shanmugam, Nirmala Tharmarajan, Kumari, Komalaa Naaidu	Thriller / Horror	
10 Jul	Aaradhana	MS Films	Malathi Sivagami	Punitah Shanmugam, Auro chakkaravarthy, Shamini Shradha, Aghonderan Sahadevan, Malathi Sivagami, Srikumaran munusany, Bobby Sri Kalirajan	Thriller	
21 Aug	Vegam, Vivegam, Vetri	Shree Leyshah Production	Adrian Reman	Anbuchelvan, Adrian, Saharudin, Puvaindrah, Ivan, Thamaraikanan	Action / Thriller	
30 Oct	Irudhi Strike		T. Danesh Kumar	Jibrail Rajhula, Sathiya, Ravin Rao Santheran, Affie Rania, Komalaa Naaidu	Thriller / Action	
13 Nov	Macai	Skyzen Studios	Shanjey Kumar Perumal	Karnan Kanapathy, Kuben Mahadevan, Irfan Zaini, Fabian Loo, Subashini, Susan Lankester	Crime / Thriller	
4 Dec	Blues	Skyzen Studios	Shanjey Kumar Perumal	Karnan Kanapathy, Kuben Mahadevan, Tinesh Sarathi Krishnan, Rubini Sambanthan, Rupini Krishnan, Kris Law, Shabby Sharath Nair	Thriller / Action	

=== 2024 ===
Opening	Title	Studio	Director	Cast	Genre	Ref.
18 Jan	Black & White	Pocket Play	Logan	Logan, Sasi, Seelan Manoharan, Latha Ramasamy, Shamini Shradha	Comedy	
1 Feb	Agrinai	Sai Nanthini Movie World	Thanesh Perrabu	Aghonderan Sahadevan, Umagandhan, Viknes Perrabu	Thriller / Science Fiction	
15 Feb	Curry Mee	Poketplay	Kash Villanz	S. Gana, Ropie, Echo Quah, Nazira Ibrahim, Kavitha Sinniah	Comedy	
7 Mar	Oru Kadha Sollattaa Sir	Poketplay	Kash Villanz	Kash Villanz, Vikadakavi Magen, CK, Ben G, Moon Nilaa, Thivya Naidu, Shivakanth, Lallu, Kim Fukazawa	Comedy Fantasy	
8 Aug	Abinaya	Algebra Films Sdn Bhd	Devendran Arunasalam	Karnan Kanapathy, Hamsni Perumal, Tokoh Sathia	Comedy Romance	
21 Nov	C4 Cinta	Poketplay	Karthik Shaamalan	Yuvaraj Krishnasamy, Pashini Sivakumar, Ravin Rao, Dishaaleny Jack, Loga Varman Strideran, Tivagaran Kaliappan, Vijay Naidu, Santeinii Chandra Bos	Comedy Romance	

=== 2023 ===
Opening	Title	Studio	Director	Cast	Genre	Gross (RM)	Ref.
26 January	Adai Mazhai Kaalam	Poketplay Sdn. Bhd.	Karthik Shamalan	Loga Varman, Thia Lakshana, Evarani, Sasitharan K Rajool	Romance Drama		
2 Feb	Sawadikap Pei	Poketplay Sdn. Bhd.	Roman Anthony	Gana, Ellicia Wong, Nandu Ramesh, Kuben Mahadevan	Horror Comedy		
9 Feb	Thallipogathey	Dreamhouse	Guna Jayakumar	Hamsni Perumal, Thevaguru Suppiah, Vicky Rao	Romantic Comedy		
16 Feb	Aadhitya Arunachalam	Poketplay Sdn. Bhd	Ben G	Gaffar, Banumathi, Mcva, Aghonderan Sahadevan, Ben G	Action		
29 Jun	Rajathanthiram: The Piano	Spike Productions (M) Sdn. Bhd.	Aaron Rao & DinakaranC	Moon Nila, Thevaguru Suppiah, K.S Maniam, S. Haridhass	Suspense/Drama		
6 Jul	Club House	Triple S Films	Amin	Deisho Sivabaalan, Shamvanan, Leanesh Sivabaalan	Action Thriller		
27 Jul	Kanneera	Poketplay Sdn. Bhd	Kathir Raven S	Kathir Raven S, Maya Glammy, Nanthakumar NKR, Chandhine Kaur	Romantic Drama		
21 Sept	Vinveli Devathai	Story Films	Shalini Balasundaram	Shalini Balasundaram, Auro Chakkravarthy	Romantic Comedy		
23 Nov	Naam Katra Isai		T. Danesh Kumar	Saresh D7, Alvin Martin, Kaameshaa Ravindran	Drama / Musical		
30 Nov	Ninaivo Oru Paravai		Kabilan Plondran	Karnan Kanapathy, Thivya Naidu, Sandhya Lord	Drama /Romance		

=== 2022 ===
Opening	Title	Studio	Director	Cast	Genre	Gross (RM)	Ref.
27 January	Poochandi	Poketplay Sdn. Bhd.	JK Wicky	RJ Ramana, Ganesan Manohgaran, Tinesh Sarathi Krishnan, Logan, Hamsni Perumal	Thriller, horror	800000	
10 February	Aval Thediyathu	AT Movies	BGW	BGW, Subashini, Sanjna Suri, Irfan Zaini, Keshap Suria	Comedy, horror		
24 February	Narigal	Boss Pictures	RMS Sara	RMS Sara.R, Jayarajendran John, Alvin Martin, Nithyashree, Lingeswaran.	Action, thriller		
28 February	Kambathe Kannemma	D' Cinema	K K Khana	Sangeeta Krishnasamy, Sasikumar Kandasamy, Tokoh Sathia, Lockup Nathan	Comedy		
24 March	Viman	SB Production	Kishok	Kishok, Jasmin Michael, Coco Nantha, Jee Kutty.	Superhero		
16 June	Arul Mozhi	Jaysanga Sir	Manan Subra	Sangabalan Subramaniam, Alvin Martin, Vikadakavi Magen, Pashini Sivakumar.	Action, Drama.		
23 June	Moondram Athigharam	KALKI PRODUCTION	Sd Puvanendran	Jibrail Rajhula, Haridhass S, Kavitha Thiagarajan	Action		
25 August	Undercover Rascals 2		V. Nagaraj	Bala Ganapathi William, K.K Khanna, G Crak Karnan, Rupini Krishnan, Irfan Zaini	Action		
31 August	Biishman	Magic Silvertree Productions	Danian Saravannan	G Crak Karnan, Vickran, Arvind Naidu, Moon Nila, Jasmin Michael, Mathi Alagan, Sheejay, Reentha	Gangster, Drama		
28 July	Senthozhan Sengkathirvaana	Poketplay	Govind Singh	Kash Villanz, Moon Nila	Thriller		
25 October	Gajen	Veedu Production	S.Mathan	Denes Kumar, Jasmin Michael, Abhirami Venkatachalam	Romantic Comedy		
3 September	Dum Dum Dumeel	Rhythm Heights; Red Sugarcane	Deeban M. Vignesh	Irfan Zaini, Kavitha Sinniah, Vicran Elanggoven, Kuben Mahadevan, Ridzuan, James Devan Arokisamy, Revathy Mariappan, Govind Singh, Pushpa Narayan, Yuvaraj Krishnasamy, ‘Vikadakavi’ Magen	Romantic comedy		

=== 2021 ===
Opening	Title	Studio	Director	Cast	Genre	Gross (RM)	Ref.
1 February	Paramapatham	Sai Nanthini Movie World (SNMW) Dreamsky Home Production	Thanesh Perrabu Viknes Perrabu	K.S.Maniam, Singai JGun, BenG, Aghonderan, Umagandhan, Vicky Nadarajah, Kavimaran (THR Raaga), Viknes Perrabu, Thanesh Perrabu, Sasivaroban, Risheekesan, Kausaliya, Pavitran, Vimal	Fantasy		
5 November	Pallavi Bakery	Astro Vaanavil	Sathish Natarajan	Irfan Zaini, Shalini Balasundaram	Romance, comedy		
9 December	Mr. Peyii	Unison Production	V. Nagaraj	Karnan G. Crack, Nithya Shree, Rupini Krishnan	Horror, comedy		

=== 2020 ===
Opening	Title	Studio	Director	Cast	Genre	Gross (RM)	Ref.
2 January	At Rainbows End 2	Fiery Movie	Mark Lee	Sharmini Ramesh, Susila Devi, Morgan Chandra Dass	Documentary		
13 February	Santhittha Naal Muthal	Top Movies Sdn Bhd Imagination Makers Sdn Bhd	Sheela Pravina	Nawinia Murali, Mervin, Kishalini	Romance, comedy		
7 March	Unakkagathane	Immortal Production	S.P Srikanth	Siva Shankar, Yasmin Nadiah, Rajendran, Rayer, Theva, Ashok Kumar, Keshap Suria	Romance, drama		
5 March	Paakaati Po	More Four Production	Kathir Raven S	Kathir Raven S, Santhini Antony, Sai Sangeetha, Pavin Raymond, Aadith	Comedy, romance		
12 March	Athaiyum Thaandi	ATMovies Sdn Bhd	Vikinish Lokarag Asokan	Vemanna Appannah, Yuvaraj Krishnasamy, Vanessa Cruez, Sathis Rao Chinniah	Romance, drama		
14 April (TV)	Kanmani Anbodu Kathalan	Astro	Kavi Nanthan	Kuben Mahadevan, Pashini Sivakumar			
15 October (Astro First)	Tamani		S.Mathan	David Anthony. Deva. Divya.	Crime		
11 November (Astro First)	Athigaari	Jhangri Production House	Kabilan Plondran	Bala Ganapathi William, Nanthini Ganasen, Karnan, Vicran, Puruji, Saha, Puvanan DaView	Action, thriller		

=== 2019 ===
Opening	Title	Studio	Director	Cast	Genre	Gross (RM)	Ref.
28 February	Satte	Dove Eyes Entertainment	Ray Dinesh David	Lingeshvaran Maniam, Kuben Mahadevan, Senthil Kumaran Muniandy, Sangkari Elancheran	Crime, thriller	27,637	
7 March	Kuttram Seiyel	Astro Vaanavil	Venkatesh, Bharathirajaa	Bose Venkat, Vijith, Dr S Selvamuthu, Dheena	Action, crime	14,615	
27 June	Azhaggiye Thee	ATMovies Sdn Bhd	Logan	Saresh D7, Latha, Guna, Kokila, Yuvaraj	Drama	50,851	
18 July	Kali Muni Tharisanam	ATMovies Sdn Bhd	DTS Indran	Ben G, Nithya Sree, P. Jegan, David, Shan, Ratnaa Gowri, Kannan Raajamanikam	Mystery, thriller	340,806	
19 September	Venpa	Vadai Productions	K. Kavi Nanthan	Yuvaraj Krishnasamy, Agalyah Maniam, Thevaguru Suppiah, Nanthini Sugumaran, Kuben Mahadevan, Santeinii Chandrabos	Romance, comedy	542,686.60	
26 September	Ennaval	D' Cinema Sdn Bhd	Saran Z	Sangeeta Krishnasamy, C.Kumaresan, Vasanth Sarna, Yashini, Suresh	Romance, horror	89,589	
14 November	Pulanaivu	Story Films Shaibha Vision	Shalini Balasundaram, Sathish Natarajan	Shaila V, Shalini Balasundaram, Kabil Ganesan, Saran Manokaran	Crime, thriller	600,048	
28 November	Metro Maalai	Victory Film Production, Drona Films	Haran Kaveri, Shobaan	Sathish, Punitha Shanmugam, Karishma, Kumanavannan, Kay	Romance	35,000	

=== 2018 ===
Opening	Title	Studio	Director	Cast	Genre	Gross (RM)	Ref.
15 Mar	33km From KL	El Praga Pasca Penerbitan	KS Umaagaanthan	Ben G, Kavi Maran, Logeswaran, Ananthan Muniandy	Thriller	208,779	
17 May	Sughamaai Subbulakshmi	MA Productions House	Karthik Shamalan	Saresh D7, Punitah Shanmugam, Bagya Arivuckarasu, Kuben Mahadevan, G Crack Karnan	Romance, comedy	138,970	
19 Apr	Villavan: The Vigilante	GVKM ELEPHANT PICTURES SDN BH	Vassan	Vinod Mohana Sundaram, Sangeeta Krishnasamy	Action		
28 Jun	Ghora	Algebra Films	Devendran Arunasalam	G Crack Karnan, Mugen Rao, Yasmin Nadiah, Sara Baskin, Velarasan, Sathish Kumar	Horror, comedy	129,816	
5 July	Atcham Thavir	JPS Consultancy & Training	S.S. Vikneshwaran, Karthik Shamalan	Gana, Uthaya, Geetha, Aanantha	Thriller	120,396	
26 July	Vedigundu Pasangge	Veedu Production	Dr. Vimala Perumal	Denes Kumar, Sangeeta Krishnasamy	Action, comedy	0	
16 August	Thirudathey Papa Thirudathey	Story Films Sdn.Bhd.	Shalini Balasundaram	Saresh D7, Shalini Balasundaram, Kabil Ganesan, Yuvaraj Krishnasamy, Ztish, Yasmin JK	Action, romance, comedy	322,400	
20 September	Neeyum Naanum	BGW Studios	Bala Ganapathi William	Bala Ganapathi William, Jasmin Micheal, Kavitha Thiagarajan, Suhan	Romance, comedy	307,956	

=== 2017 ===
Opening	Title	Studio	Director	Cast	Genre	Gross (RM)	Ref.
8 Jun	RIP?	Fenomena Seni Produksi	S.T. Bala	Suloshna Balan, S. S. Shivajee	Drama	8,156	
7 July	Puthiya Payanam	More 4 Production	Raven	Raven, Lavysha, Yoga, Koghilan Suren	Sport, drama	24,643	
3 August	Maama Machan	Boss Pictures	RMS Sara	Nithya Shree, RMS Sara, BenG	Comedy	44,651	
28 August	Vettai Karuppar Ayya	Black Hunter Production	Amigoz Sugu	GK, GpKay, Sam, Nanba Vijay, Gayathri	Devotional, horror	20,523	
28 September	The Farm: En Veettu Thottathil	BGW Studios, S cape Imagination	Karthik Shamalan	Jaya Ganason, Mohanaraj, Mahesan Poobalan, Yugendran Maniam, Haridhass	Horror	179,673	
5 October	Vasantha Villas 10:45PM	D' Cinema	Roy	Jeeva, Vadivukarasi, Ben'G, Sangetha, Saminathan	Action, comedy	7,264	
3 November	Azhal	Magic SilverTree Productions	S.Saravannan	Arvind Naidu, Gcrak Karna, DatoShaSha, Yasini Davi, Sanpagan Sannasi	Crime, thriller		
9 November	Jhangri	Jhangri Production House	Kabilan Plondran	Vicran Elanggoven, Agalyah Maniam, Baby Koba, Suga, Nanthini Ganasen, John, Daview Puvanan	Romance, comedy	140,268	
23 November	Thottam: The Garden	Blueye Productions	Arangkannal Raj	KS Maniam, Singai Jegan, Aghilvarman, Thana, Ruban, Vivian Chong	Family drama	4,089	
30 November	Aasaan	Nova Rimbun	SD Puvanendran	Hari Dhass, Shashi Tharan, Seelan Manoheran, Saresh D'seven, Sasitharan K Rajoo, Pushpa Narayan, Nazira Ibrahim, Rajkumar Kopalan, Logesshiine Ks	Thriller	71,783	

=== 2016 ===
Opening	Title	Studio	Director	Cast	Genre	Gross (RM)	Ref.
3 March	Ais Kosong	MS Digital Studio	Manan Subra	Alvin Martin, Sasikumar Kandasamy, Anu Ramamoorthy, Sangabalan, Shamini Ramasamy, Kristina Vinokree, Nanthakumar, Pradeep Singh, Sivakumar, Vishnukumar Elangovan	Adventure, comedy	13,103.21	
9 June	Mayangaathey	Shaibha Vision	C. Kumaresan	C.Kumaresan, Shaila Nair, Thivya Naidu, K.K.Khanna, Nilaxshita Kumar, Sushmeetha Murogan, Shruthi Jayshankar, Havoc Mathan, Havoc Naven, Suresh THR, Ahila THR, Comedy King Sam, Suriya Ramaiah, Kannan Rajamanikam, Saran Narayanan, Queen, Theven Taiping	Horror, comedy	536,102.00	
22 September	Geethaiyin Raadhai	Vikadakavi Production	Shalini Balasundaram	K. Karnan G Crak, Shalini Balasundaram, Vicran Elanggoven, Suvarna Panjavaranam, Kannan Raajamanickam, Maniam, K.Gunasegaran, Shan, Kameleswary, Balan Raj, Divania	Romance	529,162	

=== 2015 ===
Opening	Title	Studio	Director	Cast	Genre	Gross (RM)	Ref.
1 January	Pinnokam	D'Cinema	A. Hamen Kumar	Hamen Kumar, Anu Ramamoorthy, Aghonderan Sahadevan II, Surenderaj Yuvaraj, Murali Raj, Shree, Jessie	Action, romance	7,874.00	
1 January	KID	FSP	Praboo Ariva	Jarrel Yeo, Shashi Anbah, Arun Chandran, Sarankumar, Kesavan Krishnamurthi	Crime	6,763.50	
16 April	Agileswari	RM Vission Films, Red Fires Film	Roy Krishnan	Uthaya THR Raaga, Vikneswary Miss Vasantham Singapore	Horor	51,826.91	
23 April	Avana Nee	D'Cinema	Logaruban Loganathan	Logaruban Loganathan, Vithya Perumal, Ashwin Kaur, Rai Jacintha, Krishnamurthy Rameshwara, Sures Kumar@VSK Thinaharan, Nilasyah Rebecca. Guna, Sara Roshan, Tashmaishree	Comedy	7,479.65	
2 July	Vere Vazhi Ille	Veedu Production	M.S. Prem Nath	Denes Kumar, Jasmin Michael	Horror, comedy	220,208.39	
8 October	Maravan	Lotus Five Star	SD Puvanendran	Kumaresh, Haridass, Denes Kumar, Kavitha Thiagarajan, Logan, Seelan, Pushpa Narayan, Sangeeta Krishnasamy	Drama, thriller	91,225.71	
22 October	Muthukumar Wanted	MERP Film Factory	M.Pathmanaban	Sarran SK, Nazira Ibrahim, Haridass, Robo Shankar	Romance, action	2,376.05	
29 October	Iravan: Man Behind the Shadow	DVA FILM PRODUCTIONS SDN BHD	Kash Villanz	Kash Villanz, Maney Villanz, Darkkey	Action		
17 December	Jagat	Skyzen Studios	Shanjhey Kumar Perumal	Jibrail Rajhula, Harvind Raj, Kuben Mahadevan, Aahmuu Thirunyanam, Saravanan Vishwa	Crime, drama	224,370.43	Budget RM 300,000

=== 2014 ===
Opening	Title	Studio	Director	Cast	Genre	Gross (RM)	Ref.
2 January	Vetti Pasanga	Veedu Production	Vimala Perumal	Denes Kumar, Sangeeta Krishnasamy, Magendran Rahman, David Anthony, Alvin Martin, Shastan Kurup	Comedy, drama	339,036.00	
6 March	Vennira Iravuggal	Shine Entertainment	Perakas Rajaram	Sangeeta Krishnasamy, Magendran Rahman, Psychomantra @ Krishna Kumar Lechmana, David Anthony, Aruna Raj Devarajoo	Romance, comedy	260,353.00	
19 June	Goal		K. Guna	Irfan, Uthaya, THR Visha, Chinni Jayanth, Nazira Ibrahim	Sport, drama	16,174.25	
22 June	Vivaagarathu	Viar Ventures	Revathy	Revathy, Haridass, Aghonderan Sahadevan, Bala Ganapathi William	Drama	74,890.00	
8 August	Maindhan	Astro Shaw, CK Films, SS Wawasan	C. Kumaresan	C. Kumaresan, Shaila Nair, 'Punnagai Poo' Gheetha, Rabbit Mac	Action	732,505.80	
25 September	3 Geniuses	On Track Animation, Film Combines	P. K. Rhaj	K. Bhagyaraj, Shashi Tharan, Don Prasna, Aghonderan Sahadevan, Sangeeta Krishnasamy	Action, science fiction		
13 November	Victory	D'Cinema	P Rameesh	G.Theeban, Yamini Gopalasamy, Gana Pragasam, Shashi Tharan, Gantiban Ben	Sport, drama	40,974.00	

=== 2013 ===
Opening	Title	Studio	Director	Cast	Genre	Gross (RM)	Ref.
14 March	Ops Kossa Dappa 3	ATV Pictures SDN BHD; SSK Resources	K. Annan Joseph	Loganathan, Sasi Kumar, Buveni Ann Mayan, Jasmin Micheal, Nilasha Ravinderan	Science fiction	70,000	
9 May	Kaliyugha	Lotus Five Star AV	S.T.Bala	S.T.Bala, Geethanjali, Sharmini Ramesh	Drama	23,000	
23 May	Olli	Nova Rimbun Production	P. Rameesh	Pushpa Narayan, Shashi Tharan	Science fiction	50,000	
18 July	Olipathivu	Snap Productions	Elson Tommas	Vassan, Sivabaalan, Govind Singh, Sasi Kumar, Xavier Lock-up, Devika Raghavakrishnan, Maney Villanz & Samuel Sam	Action, thriller	11,000	
5 September	Dhusrajanam	Renbash Entertainment	M. Suurya	M. Subash Abdullah, Kalpana Sundraju	Sport, drama	14,000	
19 September	Marai Mugam	Boss Pictures	Sara.R	Mogan, Krishnapriya	Comedy	6,000	
28 September	Mella Thiranthathu Kathavu	S Cape Imagination; Mindspaark Films	Karthik Shamalan	Vinash Mitra, Joy Rasan, Kuben Mahadevan, Jaya Ganason, Yotesri, Pd Sara, LVK Prabhu	Romantic Drama		

=== 2012 ===
Opening	Title	Studio	Director	Cast	Genre	Gross (RM)	Ref.
18 October	Vajram	Genius Parade	M.Subash Abdullah	M.Suurya, Yasmin Khanif			
16 December	Adutha Kattam	NGP Film	Muralikrishnan Munian	Devendran Arunasalam, Gantiban Ben, Malar Meni Perumal	Horror		

=== 2011 ===
Opening	Title	Studio	Director	Cast	Genre	Gross (RM)	Ref.
10 April	KL to Ipoh	Silver Movies Production	K. Ganeetban @ Ben G	Logithavan, Kalpana, Govind, Logan, Sasikumar, Sam, V. Manivannan, Thanisa, Sunshine, Jeff, Alan, Shankar, Divya			
13 October	Vilaiyaatu Pasange	Veedu Production	Vimala Perumal	Denes Kumar, Jasmin Michael	Comedy		
15 November	Appalam	Tayangan Unggul	Afdlin Shauki	Raja Ilya, Gana Pragasam, Jaclyn Victor, Shashi Taran, Sharifah Amani, Chelsia Ng	Comedy, drama		
29 December	Zha The Movie		Thirumalairajan	Raaghav, Sangeeta Krishnasamy, Babloo Prithviraj	Action		

=== 2000 – 2010 ===
Opening		Title	Studio	Director	Cast	Genre	Gross (RM)	Ref.
2 0 1 0	28 October	Undercover Rascals		V. Nagaraj	C. Kumaresan, Jasmin Michael, K.K. Khanna	Action, comedy		
2 0 1 0	4 November	Ganavin No10 Singgakottai K.L		Gana Pragasam	Gana Pragasam	Comedy		
2 0 1 0	4 November	I Know What You Did Last Deepavali		K.Annan	Haridhass, Sangeeta Krishnasamy, Mathan, Raja Ilya, Logita, Mehen, Sasi, Logan	Horror		
2 0 0 9		Aanava Aattam		KK.Khanna	CK, Vassan, Jaclyn Victor, Lovin, Maney Villanz, Nishan	Action, drama		
2 0 0 9		Vikrant		P Rameesh	Sri Kumar, Shanthini Nair, Mansheer Singh	Drama, thriller		
2 0 0 8		Uruvam		V. Nagaraj	Haridass, Jasmin Micheal	Horror		
2 0 0 7	July	Chalanggai (Dancing Bells)	One Hundred Eye; MyFoto Studio	Deepak Kumaran Menon	Dhaarshini Sankran, Ramesh Kumar, Kalpana Sundraju, Bala Sundram @ Roy, Shangkara	Drama		
2 0 0 7		Senthil Vel Kakka		P Rameesh	Shanmugam, P Jegan	Devotional		
2 0 0 7		Aathma (film)		V. Nagaraj	Shashi Tharan, Jasmin Micheal, Jaysree	Horror		
2 0 0 7		Vittaghan: The Hacker	White Merpati Entertainment	S.Baldev Singh	Kumaresh, Logitha, Ganteeben, Sugunan, Uthaya			
2 0 0 7	December	Yantra						
2 0 0 6		Ops Koosa Dappa 2	Alirantek (M) SDN BHD; Guru Production SDN BHD	K. Annan Joseph	Loganathan, Sasi Kumar, Pushpa Narayan, Jasmin Micheal	Science fiction		
2 0 0 6		Sweet Dreams	Shan's Entertainment, Kino-i	Shan	Logan, V. Thangamani, Aghonderan Sahadevan, Mdm. Egavalli, Diana Rose			
2 0 0 5		Chemman Chaalai		Deepak Kumaran Menon	Sarata Sivalingam, Gandhinathan, Thr Shangkara	Drama		
2 0 0 5	12 May	Aandal	Janu Talkies	Sandosh Kesavan	THR Ram, Nandhini Harikrishnan, Unggal Shangkara	Drama		
2 0 0 5		Ethirkalaam		C Kumerasen	Sri Kumar, Sheile Raman	Drama		
2 0 0 5		Utteratchai Kali		P Rameesh	P Rameesh, Jegan, Shasha Sree	Devotional		
2 0 0 5		Uyir	Ambi Agency	M.S. Prem Nath	Mahesan, Geethanjali	Horror		
2 0 0 4		Ops Kossa Dappa		K. Annan Joseph	Loganathan, Sasi Kumar, Pushpa Narayan, Jasmin Micheal	Science fiction		
2 0 0 1		Alaikathey		P Rameesh	P Rameesh, C Kumerasen, Thr Maran	Horror		

=== 1990s ===
Opening		Title	Studio	Director	Cast	Genre	Gross (RM)	Ref.
1 9 9 1	31 August	Naan Oru Malaysian	Berjaya Film Productions	Sugan Pansha	Sugan Pansha, Devisri, K. Gunasegaran	Drama	150,000.00	

=== 1960s ===
Opening		Title	Studio	Director	Cast	Genre	Gross (RM)	Ref.
1 9 6 9	14 January	Ratha Paei		Mooban	Kalaikkumar Chinnasamy, Susheela Devi, Suresh, Jaya Gowri, Malaysia Vasudevan			

=== Other releases ===
The following films were also released, though the release date remains unknown.

Title	Studio	Director	Cast	Genre	Gross (RM)	Ref.
Agoram				Horror		
Athunge				Horror		
Kaattin Kattu Rani				Horror		
K-I-D-N-A-P (The-Crime-Begins)				Action		
Manjari	V Media	N. S. Krishna	Shashi Tharan	Action		
Naana Neeya				Comedy		
Panja Muni	Mugill Productions, Dj Golden Builders SDN BHD	Aamigoz Sugu	Ananthan, M. C. Loga, Tanam	Horror		
Saavi				Horror		
Thandavaa			Sreedharan, Vassan	Action		
Uttrachai Kali						
Vaishnavi				Horror		

== Notable cast members ==
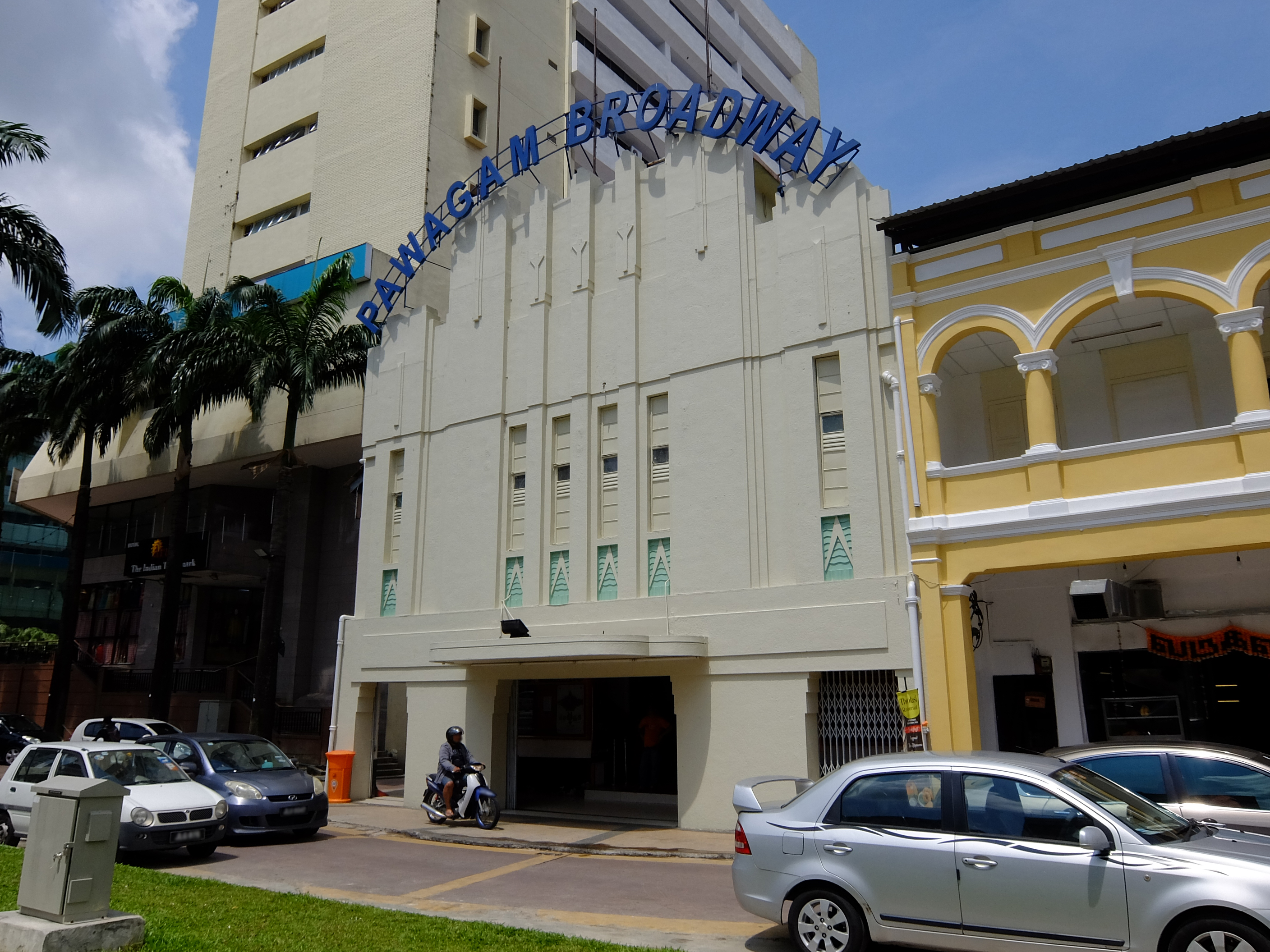
Broadway Theatre in Johor Bahru, Johor

=== Actors ===
- C. Kumaresan
- Umagandhan Krishnan
- Mugen Rao
- Shamvanan
- Yuvaraj Krishnasamy
- Ben G
- Ravin Rao Santheran
- Loga Varman
- Shashi Tharan
- Denes Kumar
- G. Crak Karnan
- Irfan Zaini
- Haridass

=== Actresses ===
- Shalini Balasundaram
- Haanii Shivraj (1991–2014)
- Nithya Shree
- 'Punnagai Poo' Gheetha
- Thia Lakshana
- Pushpa Narayan
- Sangeeta Krishnasamy
- Shuba Jay (1976–2014)
- Devakanni
- Moon Nila

=== Directors ===
- Shalini Balasundaram
- V. Nagaraj
- Perakas Rajaram
- Prem Nath
- Umagandhan Krishnan
- Praboo Ariva
- Vimala Perumal
- Karthik Shamalan
- SD Puvanendran
- Sun-J Perumal

== 1st Malaysian Indian Film Festival ==
Out of the 26 movies Malaysian Tamil films that were theatrically released from 2001 to 2011, 10 were chosen to be screened at the festival including Panja Muni and Ethirkalaam. The festival took place at the former Sree Devi Preview Theatre in T. Nagar, Chennai. Radha Ravi, Saranya Ponvannan, Vagai Chandrasekhar, Subramaniam Sinniah and Haanii Shivraj attended the event with Manobala, Charle, and Fathima Babu choosing the films for each category. R. Sarathkumar presented the awards.

=== Winners ===
Category	Nominee	Work(s)	Notes
Best Actor	Shashi Tharan	Aathma, Manjari	
Best Actress	Jasmine Michael	Yantra, Aathma	
Best Director of Photography (DOP)	Ganesan	Uttrachai Kali	
Best Director	V. Nagaraj	Aathma, Uravam, Undercover Rascals	
Best Film	Afdlin Shauki	Appalam	(Note: A 2013 report by Astro listed Papadom (the original of Appalam) as winning the award.)
Best Story	Sandosh Kesavan	Aandal	
Best Sound Engineer	Mansher Singh	Uttrachai Kali	

== List of film series ==
=== Story-line / Character follow-up ===
1. Ops Kossa Dappa film series (3 films)
  - Ops Kossa Dappa (2004)
  - 4S'S Ops Koosa Dappa II (2006)
    - Highest rated movie at Astro Vaanavil's 24-hour Tamil movie marathon
  - 4S'S Ops Kossa Dappa 3: The Final Dappa (2013)
    - Earned an entry in The Malaysia Book of Records for having the largest number of stars in a film (50)
2. Undercover Rascals film series (2 films)
  - Undercover Rascals (2010)
  - Undercover Rascals 2 (2022)
3. Pasangge film series (3 films)
  - Vilayaatu Pasange (2011)
  - Vetti Pasanga (2014)
  - Vedigundu Pasangge (2018)
