= Cinema of Malaysia =

Cinema of Malaysia

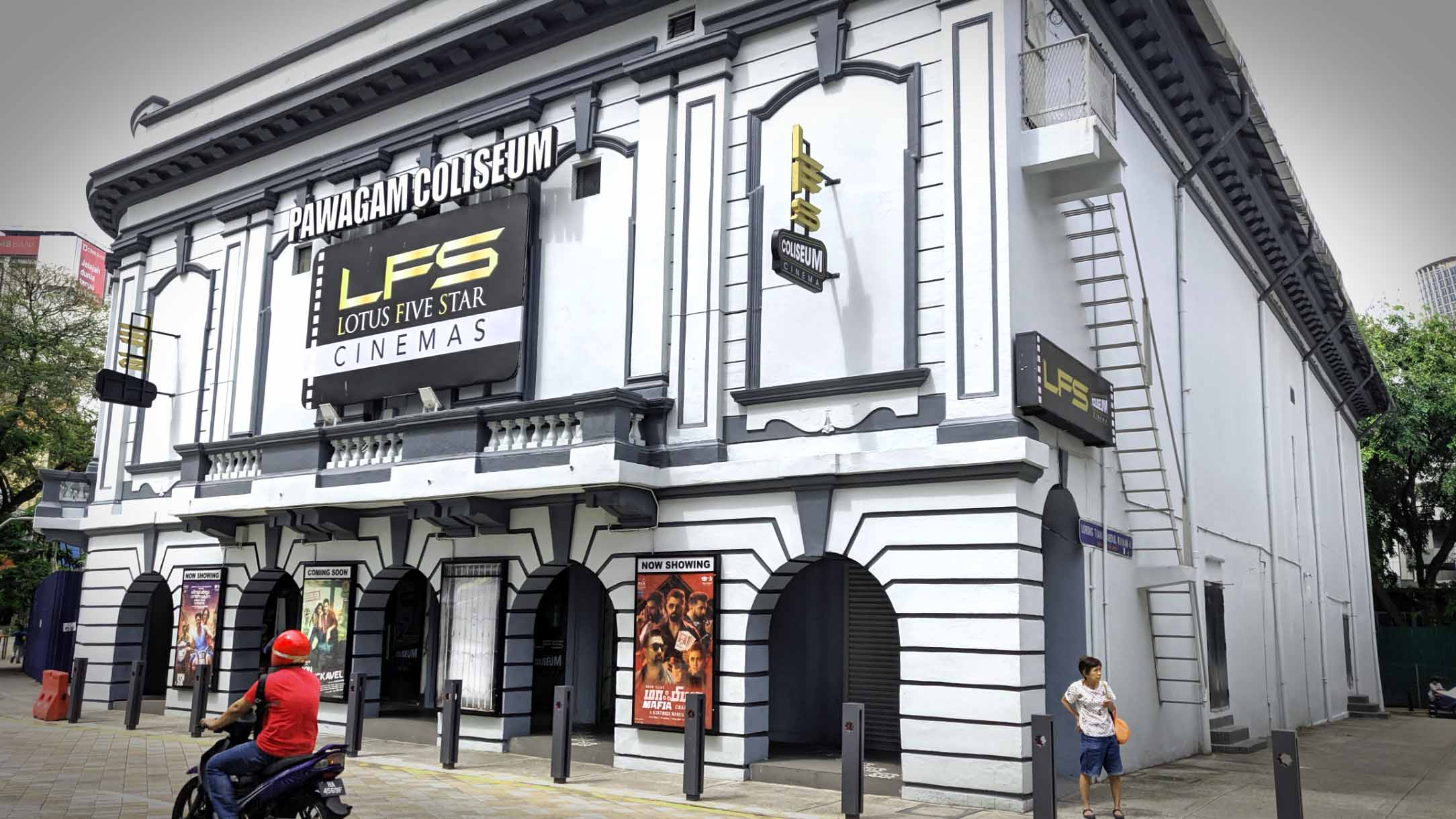
- LFS Coliseum Cineplex, Kuala Lumpur
- No. of screens: 185,997 seats (2017); 1,232 screens (2023); 151 indoor cinemas (2017)
  - Per capita: 183 seats per screen (2013); 3.5 screens per 100,000 inhabitants (2015); 4.6 indoor cinemas per 1,000,000 inhabitants (2013)
- Main distributors: Astro Shaw; Skop Productions; Animonsta Studios; GSC Movies

Produced feature films (2019)
- Total: 59

Number of admissions (2017)
- Total: 72,840,000
- National films: 4,520,000 (6.2%)

Gross box office (2017)
- Total: RM984 million US$246 million
- National films: RM57.6 million (5.9%)

The cinema of Malaysia consists of feature films produced in Malaysia: mostly shot and produced in Malay, but also Mandarin, Cantonese, Tamil, English and various indigenous languages.

Malaysia produces about 60 feature films and 300–400 television dramas and serials per year, in addition to the in-house productions of individual television stations. The country also holds its own annual national level film awards, known as the Malaysia Film Festival. There are about 150 cinemas and cineplexes in Malaysia, which show both domestic and foreign produced films. Foreign film producers are welcome to shoot on location in Malaysia and to undertake film co-production ventures, which provide local artists and those with technical roles to with the opportunity to gain exposure and experience. Currently, the Malaysian film industry faces competition from surrounding regional cinemas such as those from Indonesia, Thailand, the Philippines and India.

Currently internationally famous Malaysian actors include Academy Award winner Michelle Yeoh and Henry Golding.

== Colonial history ==
=== Early films, 1933–41 ===
The exact beginning of cinema medium in constituent countries of present day Malaysia is contested: some say footage of Queen Victoria's golden jubilee was first such event in Kuala Lumpur attended by friendly royals, others say it was in 1902. Nevertheless during this time, cinema was an entertainment restricted to only the colonial elite and adjacent class.

Malaysian cinema as truly experienced by its public began in 1933 with Leila Majnun, which is based on a classical Persian story of two ill-fated lovers. Directed by B.S. Rajhans and produced by the Singapore-based Motilal Chemical Company of Bombay, the cast was derived from a local bangsawan group. Inspired by the success of this project, two brothers, Run Run and Run Me Shaw, decided in 1937 to import filmmaking equipment from Shanghai and begin the production of Malay films in a small studio at Ampas Road in Singapore. However, they were only able to produce five or six films prior to the Japanese invasion in 1941.

Many actors from these early films came from the bangsawan theatre scene, bringing the exaggerated character of their usual performances to the new art form, aided by the endorsement of the Shaw Brothers.

=== Under Japanese occupation, 1941–45 ===
In 1941, when the Japanese occupied Malaya, the first Japanese film companies found local film production to be extremely limited. The exhibition market was dominated by overseas Chinese companies, most notably the Shaw Brothers. The Japanese would later use Malaya for exactly the same purposes, even receiving the help of the Shaws to break into their extensive Southeast Asian film exhibition network. Although Malaya never became a major film production center under the Japanese, it was a strategically important film market for Japan and a convenient outpost for moving films into and out of Southeast Asia.

The Japanese film studios shot a number of films in Shonan (what the Japanese renamed Singapore during the occupation) depicting the area in similar ways to the Japanese frontier. Films such as Southern Winds II (続・南の風, 1942, Shochiku Studios), Tiger of Malay (マライの虎, 1942, Daiei Studios) or Singapore All-Out Attack (シンガポール総攻撃, 1943, Daiei Studios) presented the area as an exotic land rich in resources, occupied by simple but honest people. Japanese colonial films also associated the region with sex as many 'Karayuki-san', or prostitutes, had been either sold to brothels or chosen to go to Southeast Asia to earn money around the turn of the century. Karayuki-san (からゆきさん, 1937, Toho Studios), Kinoshita Keisuke's Flowering Port (花咲く港, 1943, Shochiku Studios), and later, Imamura Shohei's Whoremonger (女衒, 1987, Toei Studios), which were all shot at least partly on location, are examples of the extent to which this subgenre dominates the representations of Malaya in Japanese cinema.

== 1945–75: Shaw golden age ==
Following the end of World War II in 1945, the Shaw Brothers resumed production in 1947 with a Rajhans-directed film called Singapura Di Waktu Malam (Singapore by Night) starring Siput Sarawak. Backed by their chain of theatres, which they either owned or rented, the film enjoyed a good response. The Shaw Brothers proceeded to produce more films and introduced new faces, including the Sumatran-born Kasma Booty. Her first film, Cempaka, revolved around the life of a native island girl.

In 1948, P. Ramlee, who later became one of the foremost figures in Malay cinema, made his debut in the film Cinta (Love). Ramlee rose to prominence thanks to his musical abilities as both a composer and singer. He was very versatile as a leading actor, a comic, dramatic artiste, scriptwriter and film director. Most of his early films contained numerous song and dance scenes, a trend introduced by Indian film directors. After Rajhans, the Shaw Brothers imported many other Indian film directors, among them S. Ramanathan, K.R. Seetharama Sastry, Phani Majumdar and D. Ghoss. Local film directors such as L. Krishnan and K. M. Bashker also learned the trade and techniques through experience and apprenticeship. By the 1960s, many of the expatriates were replaced by local directors.

The success enjoyed by the Shaw Brother's film studio, known as Malay Film Productions (MFP), encouraged other entrepreneurs to venture into the same business. One such example is the Nusantara film company, which was started in 1951 by Hsu Chiu Meng. However, he depended heavily on independent theatres, and after producing about a dozen films, Nusantara closed down in 1954.

In 1952, Ho Ah Loke opened a studio on Tampines Road, Singapore, calling his company Rimau Film Productions, later to be known as Keris Film Productions. Ho owned a few small theatres through his earlier venture as a film distributor. He managed to produce a number of films, and in 1956 merged with Cathay Organisation, owned by millionaire Loke Wan Tho. The company was renamed Cathy-Keris Film Productions, with its studio on East Coast Road, Singapore. Supported by their own theatre chain throughout Malaya and Singapore, Cathay-Keris films posed a challenge to the films produced by Shaw's MFP studios. Shaw studios and Cathay-Keris each produced about 10 films per year.

During those early years, all of the films were black and white. The studios had their own laboratories and recording and editing facilities. Direct sound recording was the standard practice from the beginning, until the advent of the 1960s; post-synching or dubbing systems subsequently became available and are still in use today.

Screenplays were mostly based on folk tales, stage plays, and legends of fictional or real historical heroes or events. MFP made Hang Tuah in 1956, about the legendary Melaka warrior Hang Tuah who lived during the heyday of the Melaka Sultanate. It was processed in Eastman Color and directed by Indian Phani Majumdar, who was specially brought in to ensure that the film made it to the East Asia Film Festival. P. Ramlee played the role of Hang Tuah and composed the background music, for which the film won an award. In response, Cathay-Keris produced Hang Jebat, about Hang Tuah's closest friend who becomes involved in a life-or-death struggle with him.

Just before they ceased operations, both MFP and Cathay-Keris produced three colour films each. The Shaw Brothers produced Ribut (Storm), Hang Tuah and Raja Bersiong (The Fanged King). The latter, a legend from the state of Kedah, was written by Malaysia's first Prime Minister, the late Tunku Abdul Rahman. Cathay-Keris produced Buluh Perindu (The Magic Flute), Cinta Gadis Rimba (The Virgin Of Borneo) and Mahsuri (The Maid of Langkawi), another Kedah legend written by Tunku Abdul Rahman.

Although many new companies emerged during this period, including Nusantara Films, Tan & Wong Film Company, Rimau Productions and Cathay-Keris, many closed down due to escalating production costs and diminishing audiences, leaving only MFP and Cathay-Keris both operating in Singapore.

In 1961, H.M. Shah bought a desirable piece of land on the fringe of Kuala Lumpur and turned it into Merdeka Studio. In spite of its humble beginnings, its growth surged dramatically once the biggest stars began their exodus from the two Singapore studios. Located adjacent to the National Zoo on Hulu Kelang Road, it is 13 kilometres from the city. Today, it is the headquarters of the National Film Development Corporation, Malaysia (FINAS). The Shaw Brothers dispatched some of their Singapore film directors, among them L. Krishnan, P. Ramlee, Salleh Ghani, Jamil Sulong, Omer Rojik, S. Kadarisman, Sudarmaji, Naz Achnas, M. Amin and Jins Shamsuddin, to make films at Merdeka.

== After 1975–2000: post-Ramlee, Shaw departure, foundation of FINAS ==
In 1975, a renaissance prompted a revitalised growth when Sabah Films grossed huge profits with its maiden offering, Keluarga Comat (Comat’s Family). Soon, other companies mushroomed, such as Perfima, Syed Kechik, Indra, Jins Shamsuddin, and others.

The 1980s saw numerous changes. In July 1980, Malaysian film authority was split into two bodies, namely Filem Negara Malaysia (FNM) and the National Film Development Corporation Malaysia (FINAS), in a move intended by the Federal Government to decentralised and streamlined Malaysian film industry more effective and competitive.

A vital one was the setting up FINAS in 1981 to develop and stimulate the growth and maintain the standards of the film industry by various means, including the provision of research and advisory services. FINAS has since set up numerous facilities to promote the industry, including a credit facility scheme which enables young film-makers to test their potential. The revival in the industry also made changes to certain formats of the local film productions. Nearly all the films were made in colour, some using the scope format and some the standard format. There were no fixed salaries for artists attached to a certain company or studio. A company can only do two of three functions: production, distribution or exhibition, to avoid a monopoly by a certain party. The producers also might be able to recover part of their investment by the return of the entertainment tax as a way of incentive. A further incentive to local film-makers is that they are invited to make television programmes either in film format or video format. As a result, there are now more than 300 film companies registered with FINAS.

In 1989 and 1990, over 20 feature films were produced, a number that decreased to 15 in 1995, but still more than the five feature films made in 1985.

== 21st century: the digital age, policy interventions ==
=== 2000s-2010s ===
The introduction of the camcorder and digital filmmaking in the 2000s significantly lowered the technological barrier and eventually an industry revival; films produced by these new digital filmmakers often focus and capture scenes and dilemmas in the ever-changing and increasingly urbanized Malaysian society, their small budgets also force casting of people of ordinary backgrounds as actors for immediate authenticity.

Malaysian film industry saw an increase in number of domestic film production middle of this decade from only seven films in 1999, to 26 films in 2009. The increase of domestic film production is because of new opening of cinemas and limitations on the screening of foreign films in local cinemas. In 2004, Puteri Gunung Ledang by Saw Teong Hin was released, which was the first high-profile period piece made in Malaysia since the closure of the Shaw Brothers studio system and Malaysia's first million-budget film; it also kickstarted the career of Mamat Khalid. 2006 saw the foray into the superhero genre with KRU Studios' Cicak Man and its subsequent series.

In 2007, Tan Chui Mui's Love Conquers All won a Tiger Award at the 36th International Film Festival Rotterdam. In 2008, Liew Seng Tat's Flower in the Pocket also won a Tiger Award at the 37th International Film Festival Rotterdam. In 2011, over 40 films were released in Malaysia.

In 2012, FINAS introduced the protectionist Mandatory Screening Scheme (Skim Wajib Tayang) which allow 2 local films to be screened at local cinemas every week, effective on 24 May, to solve the delay of screening faced by local film industry. As such, in 2012, 70 films queued up to be shown in Malaysia nationwide.

In 2014, Chiu Keng Guan's The Journey became the first non-Malay language film to achieve most highest grossing local film in the Malaysian box office collecting RM12.92 million on the fourth weekend of release ending 23 February surpassing that of KL Gangster with RM11.74 million. The Journey's success led to Chiu working on Ola Bola (2016), a sports film that semi-fictionalized the Malaysian national football team's road to the 1980 Summer Olympics prior to Malaysia's decision in joining its boycott. Ola Bola was a commercial success raking RM 16.67 million over a RM5 million budget. and a critical darling.

In 2015, the Ghaz Abu Bakar-directed buddy cop movie Polis Evo starring Zizan Razak and Shaheizy Sam surpassed The Journey in its place with a collective gross of RM17.30 million.

In 2016, Jagat by Shanjhey Kumar and Ola Bola was initially disqualified from the year's 28th Malaysia Film Festival's Best Film category shortlist over failing to fulfil the category's available language criteria, which caused outrage among filmmakers and the public and suspicions over conflict of interest. This led to a shakeup and revamp by Finas towards the now rendered outdated criteria in the FFM with Jagat eventually winning the brand-new Best Malaysian Film category.

=== Since 2020s ===
As Malaysia became caught in the global COVID-19 pandemic, cinemas were closed for up to a year beginning around March 2020 till late September 2021.

In July 2022, high cinema attendance was recorded for martial arts film Mat Kilau: Kebangkitan Pahlawan ('Mat Kilau: The Rise of a Warrior') directed by Syamsul Yusof, in which he was reported to claim 'earned RM53mil in 13 days', thus earning the historical epic as the highest grossing Malaysian film of all-time beating his own directed film, Munafik 2 before Polis Evo 3 directed by his younger brother, Syafiq Yusof snatch 2nd place for collecting RM54 million in 11 weeks also collecting more than RM1 million in just 7 days in video on-demand subscriptions.

== Non-Malay language cinema ==
Jagat, a Tamil-language film, won the best Malaysian film in 2016's Malaysia Film Festival.

== Cinema theatre infrastructure and market ==
The cinema landscape has evolved significantly, from standalone theaters in the 1970s to multiplexes in the late 1990s which saw advanced projection and sound systems, influenced by the expansion of shopping malls. The shift from celluloid to digital formats in the early 2000s further revolutionized the industry, including innovations such as IMAX halls, 4DX effects, and panoramic ScreenX formats that came after. The onset of the COVID-19 pandemic resulted in significant revenue losses and temporary closures. However the pandemic has seen improved ticketing systems through online apps and self-service kiosks.

== Films classification ==
At the beginning of Malaysian film industry, while watching movies, there were no age restrictions, and films were done under strict guidelines. For instance, no sex scenes and crimes were permitted. Malaysian film classification was introduced in 1996 to provide parents of minors a chance to prevent their children from being exposed to inappropriate materials. There are four 18+ categories used in Malaysia, unlike other countries, which only used one classification for each age. These are 18PA, 18PL, 18SG and 18SX, however, 18PA is rarely used. Movies prior to 1996 also carry ratings, and some of the local movies prior to 1996 later carry 18+ ratings, for example, Mekanik (1983) (later rated 18SX) and Pelumba Malam (1989) (later rated 18PL). Two of the earlier local movies with 18+ ratings since its introduction, Litar Kasih (1996) and Panas (1998), were both classified 18SX. However, these movies still enjoyed surprising box office successes in Malaysia. The latest film which used the 18+ rated for Malaysian film is The Assistant film published in 2022 directed by Adrian Teh.

On 29 March 2012, the Film Censorship Board of Malaysia released new color-coded logo designs for cinema films' classification. U or 'Umum' is now blue, which meant that the film can be watched by all ages and consists of what the Board deems positive depictions of values. P13 or 'Penjaga 13' is yellow, which signifies that caution should be taken when watching the film as it is not suitable for individuals below 13 and any viewers of that age must be guided by a parent or guardian. 18 is red, which meant that the film is only suitable for viewers aged 18 and above as it contains images of violence, horror and sex, as well as religious, political and social elements. All those changes are effective starting 1 April 2012.

Starting 1 February 2023, P12 or 'Penjaga 12' by the color of green will replace P13 while P13 upgraded into 13 to protect 'underage' and the color remains the same (yellow). For 16 is orange means that only viewers who aged 16 and above only.

== Top 10 highest-grossing Malaysian films of all time (as of September 2023) ==
=== All languages ===
Highest-grossing Malaysian films (all languages)
Rank	Movie	Year	Studio	Nett Gross (RM)
1	Mat Kilau (film)	June 2022	Studio Kembara	97 million
2	Polis Evo 3	May 2023	Astro Shaw Skop Productions Blackflag TGV Cinemas	54 million
3	Munafik 2	August 2018	Skop Productions President Productions	48 million
4	Hantu Kak Limah	August 2018	Astro Shaw	36.4 million
5	Mechamato Movie	December 2022	Animonsta Studios Astro Shaw	35.88 million
6	Air Force The Movie: Danger Close	August 2022	Multimedia Entertainment Golden Screen Cinemas Astro SixFun Media FXHammer Films	30.6 million
7	PASKAL: The Movie	August 2018	Asia Tropical Film Golden Screen Cinemas Multimedia Entertainment Granatum Ventures Astro Shaw	30.08 million
8	Ejen Ali: The Movie	November 2019	WAU Animation Studios	30.05 million
9	BoBoiBoy Movie 2	August 2019	Animonsta Studios	29.60 million
10	Upin & Ipin: The Lone Gibbon Kris	March 2019	Les' Copacue Productions	25.2 million
11	Abang Long Fadil 3	September 2022	Skop Productions Astro Shaw	25 million
12	Polis Evo 2	November 2018	Astro Shaw Surya Citra Media Blackflag	22.45 million
13	Munafik	February 2016	Skop Productions	19.04 million
14	MALBATT: Misi Bakara	August 2023	Berjaya Pictures ACT 2 Pictures Fast Bikes Aurum Investments Golden Screen Cinemas Astro Shaw	19 million (currently in cinemas)
15	Abang Long Fadil 2	August 2018	Skop Productions Astro Shaw	18.15 million

- Vedigundu Pasangge earned £222 on the first day and lifetime collection of £291 in the United Kingdom. It was the highest opening collection for a movie from Malaysia in the United Kingdom and overseas box office.

=== Mandarin/Cantonese/Hokkien languages ===
Highest-grossing Malaysian films (Mandarin/Cantonese/Hokkien)
Rank	Movie	Year	Studio	Nett Gross (RM)
1	Abang Adik	December 2023	mm2 Entertainment	21.98 million
2	The Journey	January 2014	Astro Shaw	16.87 million
3	Ola Bola	January 2016	Astro Shaw	16.67 million

=== Tamil language ===
Highest-grossing Malaysian films (Tamil)
Rank	Movie	Year	Studio	Net gross (RM)
1	Vedigundu Pasangge	2018	Veedu Production	1,330,219
2	Maindhan	2014	Astro Shaw	903,550
3	Geethaiyin Raadhai	2016	Vikadakavi Production	592,162
4	Appalam	2011	Astro Shaw	590,707
5	Mayangaathey	2016	Touchtronics Entertainment	536,102
6	Vetti Pasanga	2014	Veedu Production	339,036
7	Neeyum Naanum	2018	BGW Studios	307,956
8	Vennira Iravuggal	2014	Shine Entertainment	260,353
9	Jagat	2015	Skyzen Studios	224,370
10	Vere Vazhi Ille	2015	Veedu Production	220,208

== See also ==
- Malaysian Tamil Cinema, Tamil language movie from Malaysia
- Cinema of the world
- Southeast Asian cinema
  - Cinema of Singapore
  - Cinema of Indonesia
- World cinema
- Asian cinema
- East Asian cinema
