= Malaysian Gods =

- Directed by: Amir Muhammad
- Written by: Amir Muhammad
- Produced by: Amir Muhammad; Tan Chui Mui
- Cinematography: Shan
- Edited by: M. S. Prem Nath
- Music by: Couple
- Production company: Da Huang Pictures
- Release date: 18 April 2009
- Running time: 70 minutes
- Country: Malaysia
- Language: Tamil
- Budget: RM25,000

Malaysian Gods is a 2009 Malaysian political documentary film directed by Amir Muhammad and produced by Da Huang Pictures. Although not fully banned (unlike the director's last two documentaries), the Malaysian Film Censorship Board disallowed it from screening in cinemas and on TV. It thus was screened on college campuses and at private venues.

It then premiered on 18 April 2009 at the 22nd Singapore International Film Festival and was then shown at various other festivals, including Rotterdam International film festival and Dubai international film festival the same year, the Centre Pompidou in 2010 and La Casa Incendida in 2012.

== Content ==
In September 1998, Anwar Ibrahim was sacked as Deputy Prime Minister of Malaysia. His expulsion and subsequent trial for corruption and sodomy triggered a wave of street protests by his supporters and those who were against the authoritarian rule of the government of Dr. Mahathir Mohamad. The label for this movement and era was 'reformasi' (reformation). Malaysian Gods takes a look at several pivotal protests that took place in the year following his sacking. It eschews archive footage in favour of interviews with people who are living, working in or visiting the actual locations of the demonstrations, about a decade later. All the interviews are done in Tamil, the main language of the smallest of the three major ethnic groups. What do people now have to say about their lives, hopes and dreams? And have the socio-political markers of Malaysian society changed all that much since then?

== Reception and analysis ==
"The title of this documentary, banned in its home country, refers to the unhealthy way in which Malaysians look at their (currently ruling) politicians." The film "commemorates the decade after the Reformasi movement".
