= Thirudathey Papa Thirudathey =

2018 Indian film

- Theatrical release poster
- Directed by: Shalini Balasundaram
- Written by: Shalini Balasundaram; Sathish Natarajan
- Produced by: Shalini Balasundaram
- Starring: Saresh D7; Shalini Balasundaram; Yuvaraj Krishnasamy
- Cinematography: Sathish Natarajan
- Edited by: Sathish Natarajan
- Music by: Ztish
- Production company: Story Films
- Distributed by: Story Films
- Release date: 16 August 2018
- Running time: 135 minutes
- Country: Malaysia
- Language: Tamil

Thirudathey Papa Thirudathey (transl. Don't steal sweetheart, don't steal) is 2018 Malaysian Tamil-language romantic comedy drama film directed and produced by Shalini Balasundaram under the banner of Story Films SDN BHD. The film stars Saresh D7, Shalini Balasundaram, and Yuvaraj Krishnasamy.

== Plot ==
The heroine finds for a perfect guy in her life to get married and then she meets the hero eventually they fall in love and the rest of the plot is about how they handle the hardships and struggle in their journey of love.

== Cast ==
- Saresh D7
- Shalini Balasundaram as Amutha
- Kabil Ganesan
- Yuvaraj Krishnasamy as Krishna
- Irfan Zaini
- Manjula
- Jegan
- Hema G.

== Production ==
The film is about social issues such a theft. The film is based on Shalini Balasundaram's encounters with theft throughout her life. Shalini Balasundaram worked on the script for eight months with her husband Sathish Natarajan. Saresh D7, who was last seen in Sughamaai Subbulakshmi, stars in the film. Yuvaraj Krishnasamy was cast as Saresh D7's best friend. Unlike Shalini Balasundaram's first film Geethaiyin Raadhai, this film incorporated action with romance.

== Soundtrack ==
Ztish, who composed for Shalini Balasundaram's Geethaiyin Raadhai, composed for this film.

Thirudathey papa Thirudathey

Soundtrack album Thirudathey papa Thirudathey by Ztish
- Released: 2018
- Recorded: 2018
- Genre: Feature film soundtrack
- Language: Tamil
- Label: Devo Music
- Producer: Shalini Balasundaram

No.	Song	Singers	Length (m:ss)
1	Valikkirathey	Kumaresh	5:46
2	Nee Arugil	Ztish, Sanggari Krish, Yasmin JK	5:17
3	Nenjukulle	Kumaresh Kamalakannan, Yasmin JK	5:18
4	Theeya Vazhiyile	Arvind Raj	3:30
5	Pothum Vanmurai	Ztish, Yasmin JK	3:25

== Reception ==
A critic from Vimarsagan Media gave the film a mixed review and criticised the tragic scenes and found the story lacking.

== Box office ==
The film was a box office success and grossed RM322,400.00. The film was the second highest grossing Malaysian Tamil film of the year 2018.

== Awards ==
- 2019 PAAIM Johor Awards - Best Actress in a Supporting - Hema G
