= Haanii Shivraj =

Malaysian actress and model (1985-2015)

- Born: Haanii Shivraj Anjana; 13 August 1985
- Died: 13 April 2015 (aged 29); Chennai, India
- Occupations: Actress and model
- Years active: 2007-2015

Haanii Shivraj Anjana (1985-2015) was a Malaysian actress and model. She is known for having acted in the Malaysian Tamil film, Appalam (2011). Besides that, she also acted in the Indian Tamil films Biriyani and Arrambam (both 2013).

== Career and personal life ==
Shivraj began her career as an actress and a television anchor in 2010. Prior to becoming an actress, she worked as a flight stewardess.

Shivrasj died from cancer on 13 April 2015 at the age of 29.

== Selected filmography ==
Below are the selected filmography of Haanii Sivaraj :

Year	Film	Role	Language	Notes	Ref.
2007	Yantra		Tamil		
2011	Appalam		Tamil		
2011	Pak Kaduk		Malay		
2013	Biriyani	Shwetha	Tamil	Indian film	
2013	Arrambam		Tamil	Indian film Cameo appearance	
2013	Anushthaana		Tamil		

Television

- Tamil Pesum Kadhanayagi (Raj TV)
