= Poochandi =

2022 Malaysian Tamil-language thriller film

- Original poster
- Directed by: JK Wicky
- Written by: Thanabalan Kuppusamy
- Produced by: Andy.S
- Starring: RJ Ramana; Ganesan Manohgaran; Tinesh Sarathi Krishnan; Logan; Hamsni Perumal
- Music by: Dustin Riduan Shah
- Production company: Trium Studio
- Release dates: 27 January 2022 (Malaysia, Singapore); 1 April 2022 (India)
- Running time: 1 hour 55 minutes
- Country: Malaysia
- Language: Tamil

Poochandi (transl. Bogeyman), released as Poosandi Varan (transl. Bogeyman is Coming, alternately spelled Poosandi Varaan, Poochandi Varan, Poochandi Varaan) in India, is a 2022 Malaysian Tamil-language horror thriller film. It tells the story of a journalist from India who comes to Malaysia for his true ghost stories project and encounters a frightening supernatural entity that is haunting a group of friends.

It was released in cinemas on 27 January 2022 in Malaysia and Singapore, and on 1 April 2022 in Tamil Nadu, India.

== Synopsis ==
Thrill-seeking horror story magazine journalist Murugan (RJ Ramana) travels to Malaysia to collect local true ghost stories and look for folks with paranormal stories. What started as an ordinary story search turns into a horrific life-changing mystery when he encounters Shankar (Tinesh Sarathi Krishnan), who shares a spine-chilling paranormal experience that happened to him and his friends. Did they all survive?

"Poochandi" is a Tamil term used by South Indians to frighten children, which refers to the .

== Plot ==
An image of a scarecrow is what we get in the initial frames after which we are introduced to Murugan (Ramana), a Tamil journalist from Madurai, who writes paranormal stories for a magazine in Malaysia. On his journey, he meets Shankar (Tinesh Sarathi Krishnan), who narrates a paranormal incident that happened to him and his friends Anbu (Logan Nathan) and Guru (Ganeshan Manoharan).

Anbu has paralysis and he collects coins as a hobby. One day, they use one of the oldest coins in his collection to play Ouija and call out to a spirit for fun. Little do they realise that they are inviting a soul that's dangerous and mysterious in many ways. As the film progresses, the soul begins to entice them into accomplishing its own desires.

Once they start unraveling the spirit's past, they stumble upon a historic connection that dates back to many centuries. These friends come across a chilling twist at the interval point, and post that, the film turns into an investigative thriller that tries to decode the origin of the lost soul.

== Cast ==
- RJ Ramana as Murugan
- Ganessan Manohgaran as Guru
- Tinesh Sarathi Krishnan as Shankar
- Logan Nathan as Anbu
- Hamsni Perumal as Mallika
- Ravi Shanker as Kathirvelu
- Alexandre Dumas as Poochandi

== Release ==
The film is rated PG13. The film was originally set to be released during Deepavali season in November 2021 after delays due to COVID-19, but was eventually released in cinema nationwide on 22 January 2022 in Malaysia. The theme song of the film is "Poochandi Varaan", composed and sang by Ganessan Manohgaran.

The film's was renamed as Poosandi Varan for release at cinemas in Tamil Nadu, India because of the presence of an upcoming Indian film of the same name. It is released on 1 April 2022 in cinemas statewide in Tamil Nadu.

During its original release, the film received positive reviews from Malaysian and Singaporean critics and audience. It gained positive word-of-mouth in the weeks of its release and has managed to collect over RM800,000 becoming the third highest-grossing local Malaysian Tamil-language film. The film released on Netflix on 11 November 2022.

== Reception ==
Logesh Balachandran of The Times of India gave 3 1/2 out of 5 stars and noted that "The frames look stunning, given the fact that the film was shot under constraints in Malaysia. Moreover, the director also leaves us with the promise of a sequel, which definitely might require a massive budget". Dina Thanthi critic gave a mixed review and noted that "Director JK Vicky is scary in the way the story is told. Mallika's hostel room scenes and the climactic scene are perfect scares. There is no explanation as to why the one who is shown to be Shivanati, comes as a woman and is terrifying". Dinamalar critic gave a rating of three out of five.

== Accolades ==
Year	Event	Category	Recipient	Ref.
2024	3rd MICA Awards	Best Movie	Poochandi	
2024	3rd MICA Awards	Best Director	JK Wicky	
2024	3rd MICA Awards	Best Cinematography	A Salisham bin Mohd Ali	
2024	3rd MICA Awards	Best Background Music	Dustin Riduan Shah	
2024	3rd MICA Awards	Best Art Direction	Ravindas Aridas	
2024	3rd MICA Awards	Best Makeup	Mira Manohgaran	

== See also ==
- Malaysian Tamil cinema
- Malaysian Indians
