= Ejen 016 =

Ejen 016 is a Malaysian super secret agent action comedy drama. The drama broadcast started 21 July 2006, every Wednesday 9:30 pm on TV3. This drama is produced by DiGi Telecommunications, a mobile telecommunication company in Malaysia.

== Main characters ==
=== Sel 16 teams ===
- Ejen 016 - Saiful Apek
- Ejen Alpha 0146 - Siti Elizad
- Ejen Delta 0146 - Pushpa Narayan
- Ejen Gamma 0146 - Shanna Avril

=== Enemy characters ===
- Chief Blontok - Zakaria Hashim
- Tore - Bob Kuman

=== Host characters ===
- Amber Chia
- M. Nasir
- Linda Onn
- Jalaluddin Hassan

== Theme songs ==
1. Ejen 016 - Zaid Akbar Malik
2. Taakan ku masih duduk menanti - Zaid Akbar Malik
3. Wajah yang ku rindu - Zaid Akbar Malik
