= Pulanaivu =

2019 Malaysian Tamil-language thriller film

- Theatrical release poster
- Directed by: Shalini Balasundaram; Sathish Natarajan
- Written by: Shalini Balasundaram; Sathish Natarajan
- Produced by: Shalini Balasundaram; Shaila V (Shaila Nair)
- Starring: Shaila V (Shaila Nair); Shalini Balasundaram; Kabil Ganesan; Saran Manokaran
- Cinematography: Sathish Natarajan
- Edited by: Satish Natarajan
- Music by: Jey Raggaveindra
- Production companies: Story Films Sdn. Bhd. Shaibha Vision Sdn. Bhd.
- Distributed by: Story Films Sdn. Bhd.
- Release date: 14 November 2019 (Malaysia)
- Running time: 1 hour 58 minutes
- Country: Malaysia
- Language: Tamil
- Budget: RM1 million

Pulanaivu (transl. Investigation) is a 2019 Malaysian Tamil-language crime thriller film. In the film, a couple is entangled in a murder at their college. Meanwhile, a female cop, Bhairavi, has to trace the few suspects and find the murderer.

It was released 14 November 2019 in Malaysia. The film has the highest number of cinema listings for local Tamil-language films. It was dubbed in Telugu as Chustanaa.

== Synopsis ==
Aishwarya is a woman who is just starting college, she is trying to move on from her previous relationship. So she is not interested when her new friend falls for her and tries hard to earn her love and attention. As their love story develops, a murder suddenly occurs in their college, putting their lives and loved ones in danger. Meanwhile, Bhairavi, a female cop is investigating the case. There are few suspects, will they find the right murderer?

== Cast ==
- Shaila V (Shaila Nair) as Bhairavi
- Shalini Balasundaram as Aishwarya
- Kabil Ganesan as Athi
- Sarankumar as Shiva
- Krithigah Nair as Preethi
- Shabby as Vignesh
- Ley Shahrwind as Sharath
- KS Maniam as Aishwarya's dad
- Shashi Tharan as Siddarth
- Desmond Dass as Deepak
- Mardinii as Janany
- Irfan Zaini as Ravinder Singh
- Pashini as Vaishnavi
- Ramkumar Ravichandran as Sri Ram
- Bavithira Anbarasu as Dhivya
- Chandramohan as Mohan
- Navinc Rajamohan
- Manjula Joseph
- Saresh D7 (Cameo Appearance)

== Soundtrack ==
The album consists of 3 tracks. The first single is "En Sogame", sung by Indian singer Shakthisree Gopalan under the music direction of Jey Raggaveindra.

Pulanaivu

Soundtrack album Pulanaivu by Jey Raggaveindra
- Released: TBA
- Recorded: 2019
- Genre: Feature film soundtrack
- Language: Tamil
- Label: Times Music Tamil

No.	Title	Lyrics	Singer(s)	Length
1.	"En Sogame"	Yuwaji	Sakthisree Gopalan	4:45
2.	"Kadhal Enghe"	Satish Natarajan	Kumeresh Kamalakannan	4:39
3.	"Pulanaivu "(Theme)"	Phoenix Dassan	Chinmayi	4:20

== Reception ==
A critic from Astro Ulagam noted that "Every frame was carefully directed with clear substance and expressions. Each and every character in the movie was well picked by the director to the extent the voice modulation was apt for each character on its own!" A critic from Selliyal praised the 120 minute runtime, gripping screenplay, acting, cinematography, editing but criticised the screenplay glitches such as the lack of a day 3 and day 4 during the murder.

== Accolades ==
Award	Category	Recipient(s) and nominee(s)	Result
Toronto International Tamil Film Festival 2020	Best Crime Thriller Feature Film Award	Pulanaivu	Won
Norway Tamil Film Festival Awards 2020	Best Actor Female Tamil – Diaspora	Datin Sri Shaila V	Won
Norway Tamil Film Festival Awards 2020	Best Screenplay Tamil – Diaspora	Shalini – Sathish	Won

== See also ==
- List of Malaysian Tamil films
