= Chua Cheng Bok =

Malaysian businessman

- Born: 1880s Malacca, Straits Settlements
- Died: 25 April 1940; Ipoh, Perak, Federated Malay States
- Father: Chua Toh

Chua Cheng Bok (Chinese: 蔡正木; pinyin: Cài Zhèngmù) was one of Malaya's most prominent businessmen in the first half of the 20th century, and opened the region's first cinema. He was born in Malacca in 1880 as the second son of an immigrant family from Fujian, China. His father Chua Toh started his life as nutmeg dealer in his young age, and had five sons: Cheng Tuan (the eldest), Cheng Bok, Cheng Hee, Cheng Hock and Cheng Liat. Chua Toh died in 1908 and was buried in Bukit Cina.

Following his older brother Cheng Tuan, Cheng Bok worked for Riley, Hargreaves and Co and Federated Engineering for a few years. They started their first business, Federal Stores, before forming the Cycle and Carriage in Kuala Lumpur on 15 June 1899. In the early 1900s, the Cycle and Carriage business was successful. It opened a branch under the name of C&C Co in Singapore in 1926.

Chua was a philanthropist. Some famous buildings built by him are the oldest cinema in Malaysia, the Coliseum Theater and Café in Jalan Petaling, Kuala Lumpur, the Chua Cheng Bok Building in Ipoh, and Bok House in Jalan Ampang (demolished in 2006). Bok House was known for a story that it was built for the daughter of rich man in order to impress her father. The story later was refuted by one of Chua's great-grandchildren Chua Wye Man. One of his final acts was making a donation to upgrade the equipment for the Chua Cheng Bok Ward of the Chinese Maternity Hospital, Jalan Pudu. Chua died at the age of 61 on 25 April 1940 in his residence in Ipoh. He was cremated in Sam Poh Tong Cave temple.
