= Smart Wheel =

- Starring: Irfan Zaini
- Country of origin: Malaysia
- Original language: Tamil (with English subtitles)

Production
- Running time: 60 minutes with commercials
- Production company: Astro Malaysia

Original release
- Network: Astro Vinmeen HD
- Release: 17 September 2017

Smart Wheel is a Malaysian Tamil language game show that were currently broadcast on cable channel Astro Vinmeen HD. The first episode began airing on September 17, 2017, the show proved to be a hit for Astro Vinmeen HD. The show hosted by actor, Irfan Zaini.

Smart Wheel is a game show that allows the contestants to win weekly cash prizes by answering General Knowledge (GE) and Intelligence Quotient (IQ) based questions in each of the episodes.

== Game format ==
16 undergraduates from various institutes of higher learning will be joining this show. They will be competing with each other from 17 September 2017 to 7 January 2018 on a weekly basis to win each round. Then, they would be qualified into the Finals where they will stand a chance to win a total accumulated cash prize of RM 30,000 and a Brand New Proton Iriz!

== Episode ==
Episode	Contestant	Winner
Preliminary Round 1	Moganadass & Barathidhasa	Barathidhasa
Preliminary Round 2	Avinash & Steven	Steven
Preliminary Round 2	Sathiswary & Arun	Sathisway
