= Naan Oru Malaysian =

- Lobby card
- Directed by: Suhan Panchacharam
- Written by: Suhan Panchacharam
- Starring: Suhan Panchacharam; K. Gunasegaran
- Cinematography: Ahmad Siraj
- Edited by: Salleham Shamsuddin
- Music by: V. Kumar
- Production companies: Suhan Movies; Panshah Film Production
- Distributed by: Suhan Movies
- Release date: 31 August 1991
- Running time: 132 minutes
- Country: Malaysia
- Language: Tamil
- Box office: RM 150,000

Naan Oru Malaysian (transl. I am a Malaysian) is a 1991 Malaysian Tamil-language film directed by Suhan Panchacharam starring himself. This was the first Tamil film to be made by Malaysians and shot in Malaysia. The first Tamil film to be made by Tamil Malaysians was Ratha Pei (1969); however, that film was shot in India.

== Synopsis ==
The film is about a man who falls in love with a woman in an estate.

== Cast ==
- Suhan Panchacharam as Raja
- K. Gunasegaran
- K. S. Maniam
- Manivasan
- Bairogi Narayanan
- Ramesh
- Devisri
- S. Gana Pragasam

== Production ==
Suhan "Pansha" Panchacharam, who starred in the Tamil television series Adutha Veedu made his directorial debut with this film. The film was shot on 35 mm movie film.

== Themes and influences ==
The scene where the heroine proves her virginity by walking in fire similar to Sita in Ramayana was viewed critically by females.

== Box office ==
The film ran for a week and collected RM 150,000. The film ran full house at Federal Cinema in Kuala Lumpur. The political tension between two rival political parties negatively impacted collections. Later Tamil films such as Chemman Chaalai, Aandal and Uyir were better received than this film.
