= Metro Maalai =

2019 Malaysian Tamil-language romantic film

- Directed by: Haran Kaveri; Shobaan
- Written by: Haran Kaveri; Shobaan
- Produced by: Amy Gobalan
- Starring: Sathish; Punitha Shanmugam; Karishma; Kumanavannan; Kay
- Cinematography: David Yanez
- Edited by: Gogularaajan Rajendran
- Music by: Kaber Vasuki
- Production companies: Victory Film Production; Drona Films
- Release date: 28 November 2019 (Malaysia)
- Running time: 1 hour 41 minutes
- Country: Malaysia
- Language: Tamil

Metro Maalai (Tamil: மெட்ரோ மாலை, English: Metro, evening) is a 2019 Malaysian Tamil-language indie romantic drama film. It tells the relationship of two souls, a rejected male guitarist and a neglected woman as they cross paths with each other in Kuala Lumpur.

It was released on 28 November 2019 in Malaysian cinemas, and received mixed reviews.

The film is available on legal streaming site Amazon Prime Video and Astro On Demand.

== Synopsis ==
In the buzzing Kuala Lumpur, a dejected but talented male guitarist crosses path with a neglected married woman. As they get closer, they develop attraction and also share their opinions on passion, religion, life. They have feelings for each other but remains as friends and questions eventually how their relationship might turn into an extra marital affair.

== Cast ==
- Sathish as Anonymous Male
- Punitha Shanmugam as Nithya
- Karishma as Jasmine Vasudevan
- Kumanavannan as Babu
- Gennastasia as Nithya's friend
- Kay

== Songs ==
The film includes the song "Azhagana Nyayiru".

== Reception ==
A critic from Varnam wrote that "Directors Haran Kaveri and Shobaan have tremendous potential, as seen in the first two acts of the film that’s simply oozing with detail. But the actors lack chemistry and the dialogue are mundane".

== Awards and nominations ==
- Norway Tamil Film Festival - Best Social Awareness Tamil – Diaspora

== See also ==
- List of Malaysian Tamil films
