= Jagat (2015 film) =

- Jagat Film Poster
- Directed by: Shanjhey Kumar Perumal
- Written by: Shanjhey Kumar Perumal
- Produced by: Datuk Seri A. Anandan (AG Statue & Silverware); Myskills Foundation; Skyzen Studios; Mageswari Anandan
- Starring: Jibrail Rajhula; Harvind Raj; Kuben Mahadevan; Tinesh Sarathi Krishnan; Senthil Kumaran Muniandy
- Cinematography: Senthil Kumaran Muniandy
- Edited by: Kumarann Arumugam
- Music by: Space Gambus Experiment
- Production company: Skyzen Studios
- Distributed by: Skyzen Studios
- Release date: 17 December 2015
- Running time: 90 minutes
- Country: Malaysia
- Language: Tamil
- Budget: RM300,000

Jagat (slang derived from Malay word jahat, translated as ‘bad’) is a 2015 Malaysian crime drama film. Set in the early 1990s, the story follows a mischievous 12-year-old boy named Appoy and his relationships with his father, Maniam, and his uncles, former drug-addict Bala and local gangster Dorai. The boy faces pressure from his father to focus on school, but he is drawn to his uncle's life of crime.

The background of the film is a critical period in Malaysian Indian history, the coming-of-age story subtly underlines the plight of the Malaysian Indians community who were forsaken by the estate owners and forced to move to the cities, surviving under harsh circumstances.

The film is directed by Shanjhey Kumar Perumal. He has described the film as semi-autobiographical, having lived for two years in squatter areas with his family. It was released on 17 December 2015 in Malaysia.

The film receives positive reviews from critics. It had won the Best Malaysian Film award in the 28th Malaysia Film Festival in 2016, whereas its director Shanjhey Kumar won the award for Best Director. The film also represent Malaysia at Asean Film Fest 2017.

== Plot ==
The plot centres on Appoy, a spirited kid who would rather watch gangster flicks and make prank calls than memorise his multiplication tables. Desperately trying to keep his son on the straight path, Appoy’s hard-working father becomes increasingly abusive, as the boy is inexorably drawn to the criminal lifestyle of his uncle, a henchman for a local gang. How will their story go?

== Cast ==
- Jibrail Rajhula as Mexico
- Harvind Raj as Appoy
- Kuben Mahadevan as Maniam
- Tinesh Sarathi Krishnan as Chicago
- Senthil Kumaran Muniandy as Bala
- Marup Mustapah as Da Gou
- Aahmuu Thirunyanam as Mangai
- Saravanan Ramasamy Vishwa as Teacher Ramu
- Pugalenthan as Takkali
- Siranjeevi as Gila
- Perakas Rajaram as Vadivelan

== Production ==
The film took around 10 years to be completed as the production team faced several financial issues.

=== Filming ===
The principal photography for the film was done across 13 different locations in Malaysia. Some of the locations are Klian Intan Pangkalan Hulu, Baling, Lenggong, Grik, Kuala Sepetang, Bukit Rotan, Sabak Bernam, Jasin, Jerantut and Kuala Lumpur.

== Music ==
Jagat

Soundtrack album Jagat by Kamal Sabran(SPACE GAMBUS EXPERIMENT)
- Recorded: 2016
- Genre: Feature film soundtrack
- Language: Tamil
- Label: Skyzen Studios
- Producer: Datuk Seri A. Anandan

The film score and soundtrack album are composed by Kamal Sabran and the Space Gambus Experiment.

No.	Title	Length
1.	"Intro"
2.	"Set your life on fire-Seek those who fan your flames"
3.	"Fear is the path to darkside"
4.	"The cure for pain is in the pain"
5.	"The wound is the place where the Light enters you"
6.	"I have thunder hidden inside"
7.	"The gates made of light swing open"
8.	"Those who love fire fall in the fire"
9.	"Soul within soul"
10.	"Every end is a new beginning"
11.	"Jagat Theme Music remix by Eric Hausman"

There is also separate soundtrack done strictly for promotional purposes called 'JAGAT Naan Nalla Paiyen'.

No.	Title	Lyrics	Singer(s)	Length
1.	"JAGAT Naan Nalla Paiyen (Jagat The Movie Promo Song)"	Coco Nantha	Lawrence Soosai	3:37
Total length:				3:37

== Reception ==
The film was released on 17 December 2015 and is considered to be one of the best Tamil language movies to be made in Malaysia. The film managed to gross a moderate collection in box office despite facing intense competition from blockbuster movies like Star Wars: The Force Awakens and Pasanga 2. It was also the first Tamil-language local movie to screen in cinemas for eight weeks running.

The film available for the international audience through Netflix platform starting from April 2019.

== Accolades ==
Award	Category	Result
28th Malaysia Film Festival	Best Picture	Won
28th Malaysia Film Festival	Best Director	Won
28th Malaysia Film Festival	Best Editor	Nominated
28th Malaysia Film Festival	Best Screenplay	Nominated
2016 Kuala Lumpur Film Critics Award	Best Film	Won
2016 Kuala Lumpur Film Critics Award	Best Director	Won
2016 Kuala Lumpur Film Critics Award	Best Male Actor	Won
2016 Kuala Lumpur Film Critics Award	Best Cinematography	Won
2016 Kuala Lumpur Film Critics Award	Best Screenplay	Won

== Controversies ==
=== Disqualification in the 28th Malaysia Film Festival ===
Jagat became a subject of public outrage when it became one of the high-profile films to be disqualified from the Best Film shortlist in the 28th Malaysia Film Festival and lumped in the controversial Non-Bahasa Malaysia categories by the award organisers National Film Development Corporation (FINAS) and Film Producers Association Malaysia (PFM), because it contained less than 70% Bahasa Malaysia dialogue.

The action was deemed to be a "racist" move, as claimed by the president of the Selangor and Kuala Lumpur Screenwriters Association (PENULIS), Alfie Palermo. Filmmaker Afdlin Shauki announced on his Facebook page of his boycott to express his dissatisfaction, which was supported by CIMB Group chairman Nazir Razak and Air Asia CEO Tony Fernandes. One participating cinematographer, Mohd Noor Kassim, also followed suit; withdrawing his nominations in the occasion and returned two FFM trophies he won in previous editions to FINAS director Kamil Othman during a forum held by the agency in Kuala Lumpur. There had also been calls from both within and out of the film industry to boycott the award ceremony. The assistant-general secretary of the Film Directors’ Association of Malaysia (FDAM) Hafiz Ibrahim resigned in protest of the unfair segregation.

== See also ==
- Malaysian Tamil cinema
