= Praboo Ariva =

Malaysian screenwriter and film director

Praboo T. Arivanathan, known as Praboo Ariva, is a Malaysian screenwriter and film director. He became the youngest film director in Malaysia by directing the 2015 film KID. Praboo has stated that he intends to pursue film studies in the United States of America. In 2023, Praboo graduated from the American Film Institute as an editor.

== Filmography ==
- 2013 - The Step (Short film)
- 2015 - KID
- 2024 - Aro's World (Short film)
