= Appalam (film) =

- Theatrical release poster
- Directed by: Afdlin Shauki
- Written by: Sasitharan K Rajoo; Afdlin Shauki
- Produced by: Gayatri Su-Lin Pillai
- Starring: S. Gana; Raja Ilya; Jaclyn Victor; Shashi Tharan; Sharifah Amani
- Cinematography: Meerashiniy Chandren
- Edited by: Sasitharan K Rajoo
- Music by: R. Lawrence
- Production company: Tayangan Unggul
- Distributed by: Lotus Five Star
- Release date: 15 November 2011
- Running time: 115 min
- Country: Malaysia
- Language: Tamil
- Box office: RM 590,707

Appalam (transl. Appalam) is a 2011 Malaysian comedy-drama film directed by Afdlin Shauki. It is a Tamil-language remake of the Malay film Papadom, also directed by Afdlin, which itself was inspired by the Disney film College Road Trip (2008). The film revolves around an overprotective father, Samy, who besides his own role as a dad to his only daughter Shruti, has to take on the mother role upon the sudden death of his wife.

The film became the second Malaysian Tamil movie to be shot in 35-mm film format after the 1991 Malaysian Tamil film Naan Oru Malaysian. The film was released on 15 November 2011 in cinemas across Malaysia, Singapore, and Tamil Nadu, to positive critical acclaim by critics. Appalam also emerged as the highest-grossing locally produced Tamil film of all time before beaten by Maindhan in 2014.

== Plot ==
Appalasamy (Gana) and his wife Nalaini (Jaclyn Victor) is blessed with a beautiful girl called Shruthi (Raja Ilya). One fateful day, Nalaini gets into a car accident while on the phone arguing with Appalasamy. He promises to his late wife that he will take good care of their daughter, which leads him to become overprotective of her. When Shruthi turns 17 years old, she decides to continue her studies in performing arts at Kuala Lumpur and to be more independent. Secretly, Appalasamy applies for work as a gardener in her college to look after her. Trouble starts to brew when a famous singer decides to court Shruthi.

== Cast ==
- S. Gana as Appalasamy
- Raja Ilya as Shruti
- Jaclyn Victor as Nalaini
- Shashi Tharan as Booty Slap
- Sharifah Amani as Siti
- Afdlin Shauki as Hassan
- Sathiya
- Chelsia Ng
- Haanii Shivraj
- Kristina Vinokree
- R. Gunasaharan

== Soundtrack ==
Appalam

Soundtrack album by R.Lawrance
- Recorded: 2011
- Genre: Film soundtrack
- Language: Tamil
- Label: Astro Shaw
- Producer: Daddy Shaq

The soundtrack was composed by R. Lawrance.

No.	Title	Lyrics	Singer(s)	Length
1.	"After Life - Appalam OST"	Dr.Burn	Dr.Burn	2:51
2.	"Thanai Vanthe"	R.Lawrance	N.Kalaivani	3:28
3.	"Uchakattam"	Dr.Burn	Dr.Burn, Masta K and Micheal Rao	2:15

== Awards ==
- Malaysian Indian Film Festival 2012
  - Best Film Award
- Malaysian Tamil Awards
  - Best Film
  - Best Actress Awards - Raja Ilya
