= Ais Kosong =

- Directed by: Manan Subra
- Written by: Manan Subra
- Produced by: Predeep Singh; Sheikh; Mohinder Singh
- Starring: Alvin Martin; Sasikumar; Sangabalan; Anu Ramamoorthy; Shamini R Villanz
- Cinematography: JK Wicky
- Edited by: M. S. Prem Nath
- Music by: Rizal Yusof
- Production company: MS Digital Studio
- Distributed by: MS DIGITAL STUDIO
- Release date: 3 March 2016 (Malaysia)
- Running time: 93 minutes
- Country: Malaysia
- Language: Tamil

Ais Kosong (transl. empty ice/plain water) is a 2016 Malaysian Tamil-language adventure comedy film. It tells the story of three strangers who go on a road trip to Penang together but accidentally come between two crime gangs. The film was released in Malaysia on 3 March 2016.

It is directed by Manan Subra and stars Alvin Martin, Sasikumar Kandasamy, Anu Ramamoorthy, Sangabalan, Shamini Ramasamy, Kristina Vinokree, Nanthakumar, Pradeep Singh Sivakumar, and Vishnukumar Elangovan.

== Synopsis ==
Three strangers meet by chance and go on a road trip to Penang. On their journey north, they unknowingly ruin the plans of two warring crime gangs. Now they have to run before it is too late.

== Cast ==
- Alvin Martin
- Sasikumar Kandasamy
- Anu Ramamoorthy
- Sangabalan
- Shamini Ramasamy
- Kristina Vinokree
- Nanthakumar
- Pradeep Singh
- Sivakumar
- Vishnukumar Elangovan

== Reception ==
A critic from The Star wrote, "In the meantime, to those who have yet to watch Ais Kosong, do support this local film and have a great laugh as it is an entertaining movie".
