= Paramapatham =

Malaysian Tamil-language thriller film

- Poster
- Directed by: Thanesh Perrabu–Viknesh Perrabu
- Screenplay by: Desmond
- Story by: Thanesh Perrabu; Kohgulan; Dhiban Raj; Peregelathan
- Starring: Thanesh Perrabu; Viknesh Perrabu; Risheekeshan; Pavitran; Sasivaroobhan
- Cinematography: Jegatheesvaran
- Edited by: Thanesh Perrabu
- Music by: Balan Raj; M Jagathees
- Production companies: Dreamsky Home Production; Sai Nanthini Movie World
- Release dates: 2020 (Film festivals); 1 February 2021 (Malaysia)
- Country: Malaysia
- Language: Tamil

Paramapatham (transl. Snakes and ladders) is a 2020 Malaysian Tamil-language thriller film co-directed by Thanesh Perrabu and Viknesh Perrabu, who also co-star in the film alongside an ensemble cast.

The film was released in film festivals in 2020 and had a theatrical release in February 2021 before being screened at the 78th Golden Globe Awards later that month.

== Cast ==
- Thanesh Perrabu as Aroon
- Viknesh Perrabu as Vajra
- Risheekeshan
- Pavitran
- Sasivaroobhan
- K. S. Maniam
- Singai JGun
- BenG
- Aghonderan
- Umagandhan
- Vicky Nadarajah
- Kavimaran (THR Raaga)
- Kausaliya
- Vimal

== Production ==
The film was directed by brothers: Thanesh and Viknesh Perrabu and is reportedly the first Malaysian Tamil thriller film. Viknesh Perrabu previously directed the satan-based film Sathuriyan (2014). The idea for the film came from a book their father bought for them after which they learned that snakes and ladders was in fact from India and not England. While Thanesh Perrabu plays the protagonist, his brother Viknesh Perrabu plays the antagonist. The film was shot in Kedah, Kuala Lumpur, Penang and Thailand. The 20 minutes of CGI in the film was created by a Kerala, India based company. BenG shot a four page monologue in a single take.

== Release and reception ==
Despite the COVID-19 pandemic affecting Malaysia in February 2021, the film still had a theatrical release although many other local films were not released.

A critic from Asian Movie Pulse wrote that "Paramapatham ends up being a collection of ideas held together by a very thin central story than a compact movie, which, in the end, makes the movie very difficult to watch" while praising the chemistry of the lead cast.

== Awards ==
Year	Event	Category	Recipient	Result	Ref.
2020	Rome Prisma Independent Film Awards	Best Film	Paramapatham	Won	
2020	Norway Tamil Film Festival	Best Cinematography	Jegatheesvaran	Won	
2020	Coimbatore International Film Festival	Best Film	Paramapatham	Won	
2020	Coimbatore International Film Festival	Best Director	Thanesh Perrabu and Viknesh Perrabu	Won	
2020	Coimbatore International Film Festival	Best Producer	—N/a	Won	
2020	Coimbatore International Film Festival	Best Actor	—N/a	Won	
2020	Coimbatore International Film Festival	Best Presenter	—N/a	Won	
2020	London NIFF	Best International Film	Paramapatham	Won	
2020	MLC Awards of Green Bay	Best Presenter	—N/a	Won	
2020	MLC Awards of Green Bay	Best Jury Selection Artist	—N/a	Won	
2020	MLC Awards of Green Bay	Best Music Composer	—N/a	Won	
2020	MLC Awards of Green Bay	Best Film	Paramapatham	Won	
2020	Vesuvius International Film Festival	Best Background Music	—N/a	Won	
2020	Tagore International Film Festival	Best Genre Film	Paramapatham	Won	
2020	Cosmo Film Festival	Best Presenter	—N/a	Won	
2020	Indiescreen Awards	Best Film	Paramapatham	Won	
2020	Malaysia Book of Records	Most Tamil Movie Awards won by a Movie Director (16)	Thanesh Perrabu and Viknesh Perrabu	Won	

== Home media ==
The film was available for streaming on Netflix in Malaysia as of October 2022.
