= Shalini Balasundaram =

Malaysian film director and actress

- Born: Shalini Balasundaram; 25 October 1993 (age 32); Brickfields, Kuala Lumpur, Malaysia
- Education: Limkokwing University
- Occupations: Film actor, Director, producer
- Spouse: Sathish Natarajan (m. 2017)
- Parents: Balasundaram (Father); Indradevi (Mother)

Shalini Balasundaram is a Malaysian film director and actress. She is known for directing and acting as the main heroine in the Malaysia Tamil film industry. She gained a breakthrough with her directorial debut Geethaiyin Raadhai and went on to direct and act in other films.

== Filmography ==
Balasundaram has directed and/or acted in the following films.

=== Films ===
Year	Film	Credited as				Role	Notes
Year	Film	Director	Writer	Producer	Actress	Role	Notes
2016	Geethaiyin Raadhai	Yes	Yes	No	Yes	Arthi	
2018	Thirudathey Papa Thirudathey	Yes	Yes	Yes	Yes	Amutha	
2019	Pulanaivu	Yes	Yes	Yes	Yes	Aishwarya	Co-directed with Sathish Natarajan
2023	Vinveli Devathai	Yes	Yes	No	Yes		

=== Television ===
Year	Film	Credited as				Language	Channel	Notes	Ref.
Year	Film	Director	Writer	Producer	Actress	Language	Channel	Notes	Ref.
2019	Rail Payanangal	Yes	Yes	Yes	Yes	Tamil	Astro Vaanavil	Telefilm	
2020	Sara	Yes	Yes	Yes	Yes	Tamil	Astro Vaanavil	Telefilm	
2020	Acchammakku Oru Vishukani	Yes	Yes	No	No	Malayalam	Astro Vinmeen	Telefilm	
2021	Mente	Yes	No	No	No	Tamil	Astro Vinmeen	Television series	
2021	Pallavi Bakery	No	No	Yes	Yes	Tamil	Astro Vaanavil	Television series	
2022	Uppuroti Chidambaram	Yes	No	Yes	No	Tamil	Astro Vaanavil	Television series	
2022	Nigoodam	Yes	No	No	No	Malayalam	Astro Vaanavil	Telefilm	
2023–2025	Pasanga	Yes	Yes	No	No	Tamil	Astro Vinmeen	Television series	
2025	House Kanavan	Yes	Yes	Yes	No	Tamil	Astro Vinmeen	Television series	

== Awards and nominations ==
Year	Awards	Category	Work	Result	Ref.
2020	Norway Tamil Film Festival Awards 2020	Best Screenplay Tamil – Diaspora	Pulanaivu	Won	
