= Muthukumar Wanted =

Malaysian thriller film

- Theatrical release poster
- Directed by: M. Padmanabhan
- Produced by: Muniandi Kesavan; K. Vijayakumar; K. Selvandaran
- Starring: Sarran SK; Nashira Ibrahim
- Cinematography: M. D. Kumar
- Edited by: M. S. Prem Nath
- Music by: Sundrra
- Release date: 22 October 2015
- Country: Malaysia
- Language: Tamil

Muthukumar Wanted is a 2015 Malaysian Tamil-language thriller film directed by M. Padmanabhan and starring Sarran SK and Nashira Ibrahim.

The film was released on 22 October 2015.

== Plot ==
Anandhi receives gifs from an unknown person named Muthukumar since she was a child. She gets a message five days before her marriage in a box that tells her to come to Malaysia to find him. How Anandhi finds Muthukumar and what happens next forms the rest of the story.

== Cast ==
- Sarran SK as Muthukumar
- Nashira Ibrahim as Anandhi
- Nizhalgal Ravi as Anandhi's father
- Fathima Babu as Anandhi's mother
- Jayamani as Muthukumar's father
- Kausalya as Muthukumar's mother
- Caroline as Anandhi's friend
- Vaani
- Ojitas
- Coco Nanda
- Haridas
- A. M. R. Murugesh
- Sairam
- Robo Shankar (special appearance in a song)

== Soundtrack ==
The music was composed by Sundrra under the label of Isaikraft studios. The lyrics were written By Coco Nanda. The songs were also sung by Suresh, Satyan, OG Das, Coco Nanda, Priyadarshani, and Irene. The film's trailer and audio launch was held with Gangai Amaran and Radha Ravi in attendance.

Track listing
No.	Title	Singer(s)	Length
1.	"Etharku Intha"	Diwakar, Madhumitha Shankar	4:02
2.	"Ennai Naan Killipparthen"	Sindhi Hassne	4:22
3.	"Atham Enakenave"	Naresh Iyer	6:55
Total length:			14:59

== Nominations ==
In 2016, the film was one of nine films to be considered for Malaysian Indian Cinema Awards.

Year	Event	Category	Recipient	Ref.
2016	MICA Awards	Best Music Director	Sundra for "Aatham Enakkena"	
2016	MICA Awards	Best Lyricist	Coco Nantha for "Etharku Intha"	
2016	MICA Awards	Best Male Singer	Naresh Iyer for "Aatham Enakkenave"	
2016	MICA Awards	Best Female Singer	Sindhi Hassne for "Ennai Naan Killipparten"	
2016	MICA Awards	Best Male Newcomer	Sarran SK	
