= M. S. Prem Nath =

Prem Nath Pillai, known as M.S. Prem Nath, is a Malaysian film director and Editor of Indian descent based in Kuala Lumpur. He is known for directing first Tamil language zombie movie, Vere Vazhi Ille.

Before becoming a director, Prem worked as editor for KRU Studios from 2002 to 2004. Currently, he manages his own production and post-production house, Merp Film Factory Sdn. Bhd.

== Filmography ==
Filmography
Year	Film	Credited as			Notes
Year	Film	Director	Writer	Editor	Notes
2005	Uyir The Soul	Yes	Screenplay	Yes	
2009	Malaysian Gods	No	No	Yes	
2011	Vilaiyaatu Pasange	No	No	Yes	
2013	Ops Kossa Dappa 3	No	No	Yes	
2014	Vetti Pasanga	No	No	Yes	
2014	Maindhan	No	No	Yes	
2015	Vere Vazhi Ille	Yes	Yes	Yes	First Zombie movie in Tamil Movie Industry worldwide Best Astro First Movie Award at MICA Awards
2015	Muthukumar Wanted	No	No	Yes	
2016	Ais Kosong	No	No	Yes	
2018	Rise: Ini Kalilah	Co-Director	Screenplay	No	Co-Directed with Saw Teong Hin & Nik Amir
2019	Irul Ghost Hotel	Yes	Yes	Yes	First found footage Tamil movie
2023	Veera	Yes	Yes	Yes	Television series; Won—Ulagam Awards 2023 for Best Promo/Trailer (Telemovie/Series)
