= Pushpa Narayan =

Malaysian Model

- Born: Jerantut, Pahang, Malaysia
- Occupations: Model; Actress; Host; Influencer; Entrepreneur
- Years active: 2004–present
- Children: 2
- Awards: Dewi Remaja 2002/2003 (1st Runner-Up); Miss Malaysia Universe 2004 (1st Runner-Up)

Pushpa Narayan is a Malaysian model, actress, host, influencer, and entrepreneur of Indian descent. She first gained prominence as the first runner-up in both Dewi Remaja 2002/2003 and Miss Universe Malaysia 2004. Narayan has since established a versatile acting career, appearing in numerous television series, dramas, and feature films. Additionally, she is an accomplished television host, working across both Malay- and Tamil-language productions.

== Career ==
She became famous after placing second at the 2002 Dewi Remaja. She later joined Miss Malaysia Universe 2004 and placed second to the actual winner, Andrea Fonseka. She also won the Miss Love & Lace Photogenic and Miss Health and Beauty subsidiary awards during the pageant. She then branched into acting and find success in local entertainment industry. In 2005 she also worked in a Pakistani drama Masuri.

== Filmography ==
=== Television ===
Year	Title	Role	Notes	Ref
2003	Sensasi Bollywood	Host		
2003	Skuad Elit			
2004	Sutra Bintang Yang Seribu			
2005	Camelia			
2005	Gerak Khas			
2005	Ejen 016	Ejen Delta 0146		
2005	Masuri			
2007–2008	Fara	Mahendra	Seasons 1–3	
2012	Tirupam			
2012	Bila Otai Bercinta			
2017	Anak Merdeka			
2021	I-Tanggang: Mother of All Lies			
2021	Sevanthu Pochi Nenje		Nominated–Ulagam Award for Popular Actor/Actress in a Supporting Role [Telemovie & Series]	
2022	Maracurry Mess	Host		
2023	Kadavulukku Oru Kaditham		Telefilm	
2025	One Cent Thief		season 2	

=== Film ===
Year	Title	Role	Notes	Ref
2004	Ah Loke Kafe			
2004	SH3			
2004	Ops Kossa Dappa	Agent Susan		
2005	Gangster	Chitra		
2005	Sembilu 2005	Puspa		
2006	Ops Kossa Dappa 2	Agent Susan	Also dialogue writer	
2007	Diva			
2007	1957: Hati Malaya			
2013	Olli			
2015	Maravan			
2017	Aasaan			
2018	Rise: Ini Kalilah	Selva's wife		
2022	Dum Dum Dumeel			
2024	Padu			
2024	Mr & Mrs			
