= Macai (film) =

- Directed by: Sun-J Perumal
- Written by: Sun-J Perumal
- Produced by: Sun-J Perumal; Sivanantham Perianan
- Starring: Karnan G. Crak; Irfan Zaini; Kuben Mahadevan; Fabian Loo; Subhashini Asokan; Susan Lankester
- Cinematography: Gwai Lou
- Edited by: Akashdeep Singh
- Music by: Neroshen Thanaseharan
- Production company: Skyzen Studios
- Distributed by: Pocketplay Films
- Release date: 13 November 2025
- Country: Malaysia
- Language: Tamil

Macai (transl. Tools) is s a 2025 Malaysian Tamil-language neo-noir film directed by Sun-J Perumal. The film stars Karnan G. Crak, Irfan Zaini, Kuben Mahadevan,Fabian Loo, Subhashini Asokan and Susan Lankester. The film was the only Malaysian film to be screened at the Big Screen competition of the International Film Festival Rotterdam in 2025.

== Cast ==
- Karnan G. Crak as Siam
- Irfan Zaini as Jack
- Kuben Mahadevan as Oosi
- Fabian Loo
- Subhashini Asokan
- Susan Lankester as Ibu

== Reception ==
Aidal Rusui of Malay Mail wrote, "It’s a nice balance of enigmatic and straightforward storytelling, all wrapped up in a gorgeous visual package that’s so striking, especially during the first few scenes and the last few scenes, that many of them will burn themselves into your memory for days to come". Ashwin Kumar of The Sinar Daily wrote, "Macai is a rare example of local cinema that prioritises authenticity and originality". Dennis Chua of the New Straits Times wrote, "Its fast pace also keeps viewers on the edge and constantly rooting for our three underdogs on their damning, or liberating, small town road trip".

== Awards ==
| Year | Event | Category | Recipient | Result | Ref. |
|---|---|---|---|---|---|
| 2026 | 11th Kuala Lumpur Film Critics Awards | Best Film | Macai | Won | |
| 2026 | 11th Kuala Lumpur Film Critics Awards | Best Director | Sun-J Perumal | Won | |
| 2026 | 11th Kuala Lumpur Film Critics Awards | Best Actor | Karnan Kanapathy | Won | |
| 2026 | 11th Kuala Lumpur Film Critics Awards | Best Supporting Actor | Kuben Mahadevan | Won | |
| 2026 | 11th Kuala Lumpur Film Critics Awards | Best Cinematography | Gwai Lou | Won | |
