= Narigal =

- Theatrical release poster
- Directed by: RMS Sara R.
- Starring: RMS Sara R.; Jayarajendran John; Alvin Martin Santhiavoo; Nithya Shree; Lingkesvaran Maniam
- Production company: Boss Pictures
- Distributed by: Poketplay Films
- Release date: 24 February 2022 (Malaysia)
- Running time: 127 minutes
- Country: Malaysia
- Language: Tamil

Narigal (transl. Foxes) is a 2022 Malaysian Tamil-language crime thriller film directed by RMS SaraR. The film tells the story of a man who has to investigate and hunt down a cybercrime syndicate who is extorting money from female victims and uploading videos of them.

== Synopsis ==
Distraught by his daughter's nude photos being distributed on the internet without consent, the father along with some family members commit suicide. Determined to uncover the cause of the suicide, a man investigates and discovers that an online cybercrime syndicate is actively extorting money from female victims and uploading obscene videos. How he tracks down the suspects of syndicate forms the rest of the story.

== Cast ==
- RMS Sara R.
- Jayarajendran John
- Alvin Martin Santhiavoo
- Nithya Shree
- Lingkesvaran Maniam
- K. S. Maniam
- Susila Devi
- Nalini Nisha
- Subra G
- ST Bala
- Arivanath
- Slim Lazer YD
- Ashveen Chakravarthy
- Dinesh Kumar Ramokrishnan
- Kayalvili Ravi

== Awards ==
Year	Award	Category	Recipient	Ref.
2021	Norway Tamil Film Festival	Best Feature Film Tamil - Diaspora	Won	
2021	Norway Tamil Film Festival	Best Director Tamil - Diaspora	Won	
