= Aandal =

Malaysian Tamil-language romantic drama film

- Poster
- Directed by: Sandosh Kesavan
- Written by: Ghandi Kasinadan (dialogue)
- Screenplay by: Sandosh Kesavan
- Story by: Sandosh Kesavan
- Produced by: Sandosh Kesavan
- Starring: Ram; Nandhini Harikrishnan; Unggal Shangkara
- Cinematography: Daven Raghvan
- Edited by: Logan
- Music by: Jay; Suresh Rogen
- Production company: Janu Talkies
- Release date: 12 May 2005
- Country: Malaysia
- Language: Tamil

Aandal is a 2005 Malaysian Tamil-language romantic drama film written, produced, and directed by Sandosh Kesavan and starring Ram, Nandhini Harikrishnan, and Unggal Shangkara.

== Plot ==
Based on a true story, the film follows Aandal, a poor estate woman, as she elopes with Suresh, only to find out that she has now found herself in a world of drugs and prostitution.

== Cast ==
- Ram THR as Suresh
- Nandhini Harikrishnan as Aandal
- Unggal Shangkara as Guna
- Jojo Bala as Taukeh
- Rajah Maniam as Doctor James
- Kalaimaamani Yegavalli as Asha Patti
- R. Shanmuganathan Mano Ramalingam as Murali
- Virupashini as Radha
- Prem
- P. S. Bama
- K. Chidambaram
- K. Mohana Kumar
- Sebastian
- Gogo
- Murugan Nadesan
- Ghandi Kasindadan
- Nisha
- Marina Rasmekhunathan
- Jamiran
- Ganeson
- Jay
- Thanesh
- Darshavina Ishika Dewi
- Kumar
- Rajkumar
- Dr. Alice Pratima in a special appearance

== Production ==
The film was produced by Sandosh Kesavan's production company, Janu Talkies, which he established in 2003. According to Kesavan, Aandal is a "sincere", "heartfelt", and "special" project for him because it was made during a time when he was pushed away from the commercial side of the industry.

== Soundtrack ==
The music was composed by Jay and Suresh Rogen. The lyrics were written by Thozhi and Suresh Rogen.

Track listing
No.	Title	Singer(s)	Length
1.	"En Manase"	Sharmila Sivaguru	4:38
2.	"Penne Un Paathai"	Suresh Rogen
3.	"Theme Song"	Suresh Rogen, Jay

== Release ==
The film received a lukewarm response at the box office. At the time of its release, Aandal sold the highest number of VCDs in Malaysia and Singapore amongst other local Tamil movies. Kesavan gained recognition throughout Malaysia after the film's release. In 2012, the film won the special jury award for its story at the first Malaysian Indian film festival.
