= Vere Vazhi Ille =

- film poster
- Directed by: M. S. Prem Nath
- Written by: M. S. Prem Nath
- Produced by: Denes Kumar; Vimala Perumal
- Starring: Denes Kumar; Jasmine Michael; Sai Prashanth; Janani Balu; Magendran "Vikadakavi" Raman
- Cinematography: MG Kumar
- Edited by: M. S. Prem Nath
- Music by: Daddy Shaq
- Production company: Veedu Production Sdn Bhd
- Distributed by: Veedu Production Sdn Bhd
- Release date: 2 July 2015
- Running time: 84 Minute
- Country: Malaysia
- Language: Tamil
- Box office: RM220,208

Vere Vazhi Ille (transl. There is no other way) is a 2015 Malaysian Tamil-language horror comedy and the first zombie film in Malaysian Tamil, written and directed by M. S. Prem Nath. It stars Denes Kumar in the lead role with Jasmine Michael. The film was released on 2 Jul 2015 in Malaysia and Singapore.

Then, the sequel of this movie, Mr. Peyii was released on 9 December 2021.

== Plot ==
Surya is an easygoing laidback guy who constantly switches jobs. One day, he accepts a job from his former employer at a security agency, who offers him RM3,000 for a 2-day and 1-night job as security guard at a soon-to-be shut down shopping complex building. Maniam, the former Head of Security, gives Surya a tour in the building and tells him that the most suspicious and dangerous place he should avoid is the sixth floor, which is currently rented by a religious yoga group led by `Swamiji` (priest). They are up to no good as they plan to summon and trap spirits in dead bodies so that they can control them. When the door to the spirit world is opened, dozens are possessed and turned into flesh eating Zombies. The only way to stop the Zombies is to get the Black Magic Book located on the sixth floor.

== Cast ==
- Denes Kumar
- Jasmine Michael
- Sai Prashanth
- Janani Balu
- Magendran "Vikadakavi" Raman
- Prakash
- Alvin Martin
- Thinagaran (Thiran)
- Kristina Vinokree
- Farah Hanim

== Soundtrack ==
The soundtrack composed by Daddy Shaq.

Vere Vazhi Ille

Soundtrack album by Daddy Shaq
- Released: 2015
- Recorded: 2015
- Genre: Film soundtrack
- Language: Tamil
- Label: Veedu Production
- Producer: Daddy Shaq

Daddy Shaq chronology
Vere Vazhi Ille	Settai Hotel

No.	Title	Singer(s)	Length
1.	"Vere Vazhi Ille OST"	Daddy Shaq, Queen, Stylo Maanavan, Psycho Mantra	4:01
2.	"Anbe Nee Pothum"	Shastan Kurup, Badma	4:02
3.	"Unnai Yenni Partha"
4.	"Muttazaghi"
5.	Untitled	Kuchi Kuchi Raakama

== Nominations ==
Event	Category	Recipient	Ref.
MICA Awards	Best Movie	Vere Vazhi Ille	
MICA Awards	Best Director	M. S. Prem Nath	
MICA Awards	Best Editor	M. S. Prem Nath	
MICA Awards	Best Cinematographer	M. G. Kumar	
MICA Awards	Best Music Director	Daddy Shaq for "Anbe Nee Pothum"	
MICA Awards	Best Song	"Anbe Nee Pothum"	
MICA Awards	Best BGM	Daddy Shaq	
MICA Awards	Best Male Singer	Shastan Kurup for "Anbe Nee Pothum"	
MICA Awards	Best Female Singer	Badma K for "Anbe Nee Pothum"	
MICA Awards	Best Supporting Actress	Kristina Vinokree	
MICA Awards	Best Art Director	Rajane Kanth	
MICA Awards	Best Makeup Artiste	Narumatha	

== See also ==
- Malaysian Tamil cinema
