= Irfan Zaini =

Malaysian Indian actor (born 1995)

- Born: Muhammad Irfan bin Mohamed Zaini; June 5, 1995 (age 31) (Note: He was aged 26 on 05 June 2021. He was aged 30 on 5 June 2025.); Kuala Lumpur, Malaysia
- Occupations: Actor, model, television host
- Years active: 2008; 2014–present

Muhammad Irfan Mohamed Zaini (born 5 June 1995) is a Malaysian Indian actor, model and television host.

== Life and career ==
His father runs a food and beverage business, and his mother is a housewife. As a child, Irfan visited the sets of Kuruvi (2008) whilst the film crew was shooting in Malaysia and landed a role as the brother of Trisha's character. He returned to studies based on his parents' advice and completed his bachelor's degree in International Business and Marketing. In October 2020, he started his own cosmetic company IZ Cosmetic, which focuses on hair oil for hair loss.

In 2024, he returned to Indian Tamil cinema with The Greatest of All Time. He received nationwide acclaim for his role in Blood Brothers (2025), which he described as a playboy amongst the gangsters that provides comic relief. For a scene in the film, Irfan was repeatedly hit 38 times as director Syafiq Yusof wanted to perfect the scene. Regarding his role in the film Macai, a critic noted that he looked "particularly cool from beginning to end". Irfan starred in Jana Nayagan (2026), after Vijay gave him information on how to audition.

== Partial filmography ==
- Note (Note: As of 31 March 2021, he acted in five films and five television series.)

=== Films ===
Year	Title	Role	Language	Notes
2008	Kuruvi	Devi's brother	Tamil	Uncredited role
2014	Thirudathey Papa Thirudathey		Tamil	
2019	Pulanaivu	Ravinder Singh	Tamil	
2020	Showtime 1958	David	Malay	
2022	Aval Thediyathu		Tamil	
2022	Hantu Balik Pagi	Kumar	Malay	Telefilm
2022	Dum Dum Dumeel	Thinesh	Tamil	
2023	Polis EVO 3	Irfan Zain	Malay	Cameo
2023	Rajathathiram: The Piano	Gajen	Tamil	
2023	Naam Katra Isai	Naqeed	Tamil	
2024	The Greatest of All Time	Johnson	Tamil	
2024	C4 Cinta	Engagement guest	Tamil	Cameo
2025	Bad Days Don't Last		Tamil	Short film
2025	Blood Brothers	Malik	Malay	
2025	Macai	Jack	Malay	
2025	Irudhi Strike	Naqeed	Tamil	
2026	Irumbuth Thottam (Ladang Besi)	Rahim	Tamil	
2026	Jana Nayagan	Salman	Tamil	

=== Television ===
Year	Title	Role	Channel	Language	Notes
2017	Smart Wheel	Host	Astro Vinmeen	Tamil	
2021	Mente	Rakesh	Astro Vinmeen	Tamil	
2022	Astra		Astro Vinmeen	Tamil	
2022	Magarantham		Astro Vinmeen	Tamil	
2023	Akira Khan	Zafar Khan	Astro Ria	Malay	
2023	Manmadha Bullets		Astro Vinmeen	Tamil	Season 2
2023	Andai Itu Takdirnya	Jay	Astro Ria	Malay	
2024	Miss Rasathi		Astro Vinmeen	Tamil	
2024	Takdir Itu Milik Aku	Alando	Astro Ria	Malay	
2024	Mei	Deva	Mediacorp Vasantham	Tamil	
2024	Nafsu (TV series)	Inspector Shariff	Viu	Malay	1 episode
2025	One Cent Thief 2	Mohan	Astro Citra	Malay	
2025	Honey Trap (TV series)	Megat Borhan	Astro Citra	Malay	

== Awards ==
Year	Award	Category	Work	Result	Ref.
2021	Raaga.com Malaysian Star of the Month (May)	—N/a	—N/a	—N/a	
2024	MICA Awards	Best Actor	Dum Dum Dumeel	Nominated	
2024	MICA Awards	Best Villain	Naam Katra Isai	Won	
2026	Desam International Icon Awards (DIIA)	Best Actor		Won	
