= Love Conquers All (2006 film) =

- Directed by: Tan Chui Mui
- Written by: Tan Chui Mui
- Produced by: Amir Muhammad; Da Huang Pictures
- Starring: Coral Ong Li Whei (Ping); Stephan Chua Jyh Shyan (John); Leing Jiun Jiun (Mei); Ho Chi Lai (Hong Jie)
- Cinematography: James Lee
- Music by: Steven Leong
- Distributed by: Lorna Tee
- Release dates: 13 October 2006 (Pusan International Film Festival); 21 December 2006 (Malaysia)
- Running time: 90 minutes
- Country: Malaysia
- Language: Mandarin

Love Conquers All is a 2006 movie by Malaysian director Tan Chui Mui.

== Synopsis ==
Ping (Coral Ong Li Whei) has come from Penang in the north to Kuala Lumpur to work with her aunt. There she meets John, a young man who keeps trying to approach her. Ping feels increasingly attracted to John, and although she has a boyfriend in Penang she is drawn more and more into his world. Ping loses herself in her love and does all she can to keep John.

== Cast ==
- Coral Ong Li Whei (Ping)
- Stephan Chua Jyh Shyan (John)
- Leing Jiun Jiun (Mei)
- Ho Chi Lai (Hong Jie)

== Release history ==
Country	Date
South Korea (premiere at Pusan International Film Festival)	13 October 2006
Japan (Tokyo International Film Festival)	24 October 2006
Malaysia	21 December 2006
Netherlands (International Film Festival Rotterdam)	26 January 2007
Argentina (Mar del Plata Film Festival)	11 March 2007
Hong Kong (Hong Kong International Film Festival)	1 April 2007

== Awards ==
It has won several awards such as:

- The Swiss Oikocredit award at Fribourg
- Tiger award at Rotterdam International Film Festival
- New Currents Award at Pusan International Film Festival

== Reception ==
A review in Variety stated, " Authentic perfs help maintain interest, but helming is uninspired and cannot transcend this DV effort’s severe technical limitations. A continuous torrent of indiscriminate noise on the soundtrack is particularly irritating." while Screen Anarchy commented, "Despite not rising above the trappings of a cautionary tale, Love Conquers All is still an impressive debut feature."
