= Tan Chui Mui =

Malaysian filmmaker based in Malaysia (born 1978)

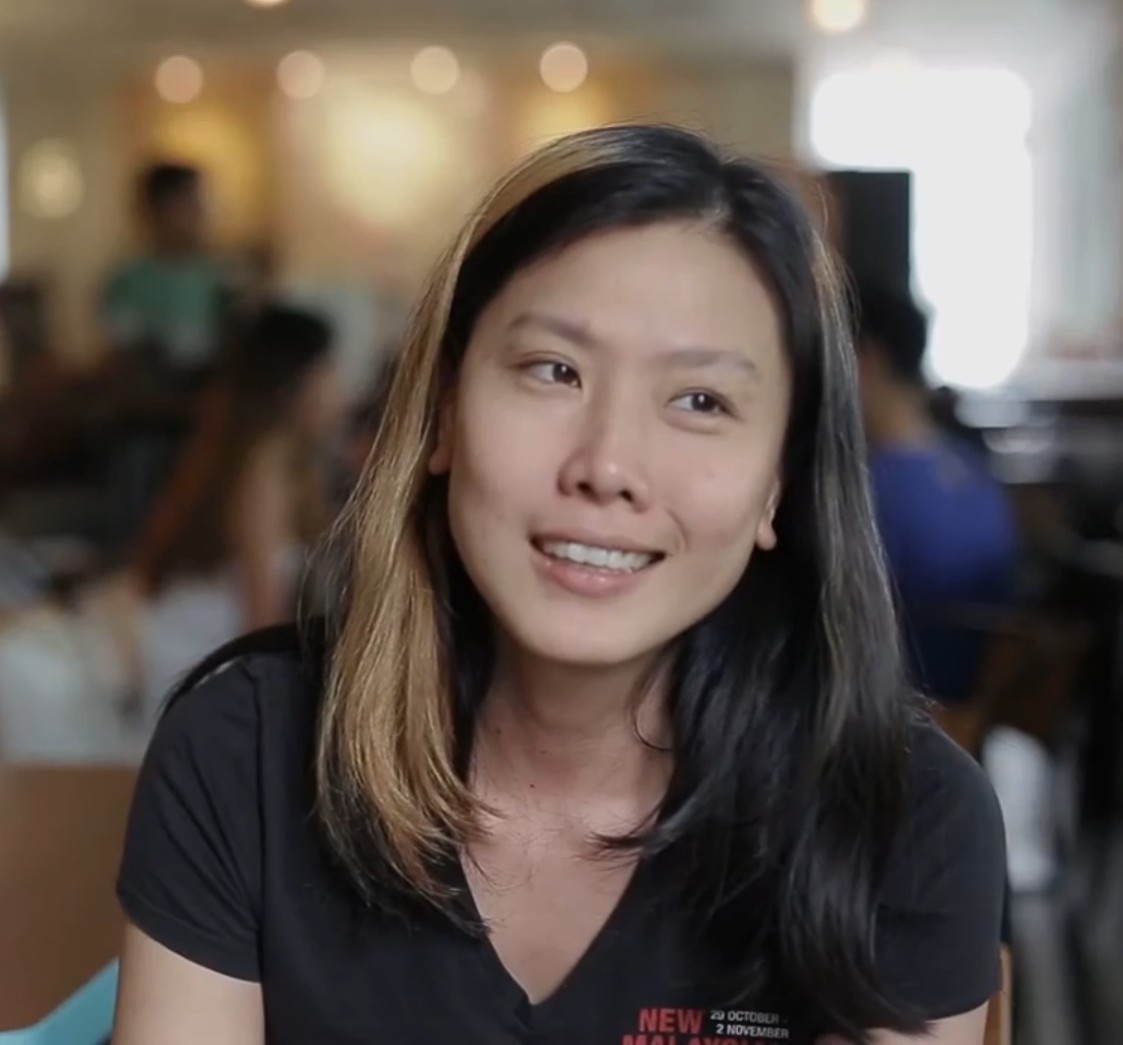

Chinese name
- Traditional Chinese: 陳翠梅
- Simplified Chinese: 陈翠梅
- Hanyu Pinyin: Chén Cuìméi
- Jyutping: Can4 Ceoi3 Mui4
- Hokkien POJ: Tân Chhùi-mûi

Tan Chui Mui (Chinese: 陳翠梅; pinyin: Chén Cuìméi; Pe̍h-ōe-jī: Tân Chhùi-mûi, born 1978) is a Malaysian filmmaker, film producer and director.

== Background ==
Tan was born in Sungai Ular, a small fishing village in Kuantan, Malaysia. Her father is from Kinmen, Taiwan. She graduated with a Bachelor of Multimedia (Hons) in Film and Animation in 2002 from Multimedia University, Malaysia.

== Career ==
Wang Ge of Time Out Beijing identifies Tan Chui Mui of being at the forefront of a new wave of Malaysian filmmakers who deal with social issues. In 2007, she received the Tiger Award from the 36th International Film Festival Rotterdam with her debut feature film Love Conquers All. The film had previously won the New Currents Awards and Fipresci Award at the 11th Pusan International Film Festival in 2006. In 2010, Year Without a Summer was selected for the Asian Cinema Fund, receiving funding for both the script and post-production. She is also a prolific short filmmaker, who had won prizes in two short film festivals, Oberhausen Short Film Festival and Clermont-Ferrand Short film Festival. In 2008, she had a project of making a short film every month. She had made 7 short films, and she called them All My Failed Attempts. In 2010, she was a judge at the Malaysia Airlines short film competition.

She has been actively involved in the Malaysia independent film scene, working as a producer, editor, script writer, and occasionally an actress. In 2004, she set up Da Huang Pictures with Amir Muhammad, James Lee and Liew Seng Tat.

== Political views ==
In December 2023, alongside 50 other filmmakers, Tan Chui Mui signed an open letter published in Libération demanding a ceasefire and an end to the killing of civilians amid the 2023 Israeli invasion of the Gaza Strip, and for a humanitarian corridor into Gaza to be established for humanitarian aid, and the release of hostages.

== Filmography ==
=== As writer and director ===
| Year | Title | Notes |
|---|---|---|
| 2005 | A Tree in Tanjung Malim | short film |
| 2006 | Love Conquers All | |
| 2006 | Company of Mushrooms | short film; director only |
| 2006 | South of South | short film |
| 2010 | Year Without A Summer | |
| 2021 | Barbarian Invasion | |

=== As film producer ===
| Year | Title | Notes |
|---|---|---|
| 2005 | Chemman Chaalai (The Gravel Road) | |
| 2006 | Apa khabar orang kampung? | |
| 2006 | Before we fall in love again | |
| 2020 | Sometime, Sometime | Also actress |
