= Chemman Chaalai =

- Directed by: Deepak Kumaran Menon
- Written by: Sooria Kumari
- Produced by: Tan Chui Mui
- Starring: Saratha Maran; Gandhi Nathan; THR Shangkara; Kalyani; Santhia Marathamuthu; Tharoni Mottian; Dhaarshini Sankran; Bala Sundram; Dinesh Ganesan
- Cinematography: Albert Hue
- Music by: Hardesh Singh
- Release date: 2005
- Running time: 92 minutes
- Country: Malaysia
- Languages: Tamil; Malay; Mandarin; English

Chemman Chaalai (The Gravel Road) is a 2005 Malaysian family drama film directed by Indian-Malaysian director Deepak Kumaran Menon.

== Plot ==
Set in the late 1960s, the film is about Shantha, an impoverished Malaysian Tamil girl, and her family. They all live together on a family estate, in an area where higher education for women is almost impossible. Shantha, a girl of many aspirations, wants to leave the estate and further her studies, however the financial hardships that will result make her dreams nearly impossible to achieve.

== Production ==
The film is director Deepak Kumaran Menon's first feature-length film. It was funded entirely by his father, Shanker Menon, the film's executive producer, and shot in digital video.

He received many applicants, who wanted to act in the film, some even travelling by train or bus.

== Reception ==
The film "struck a deep chord with the ethnic Indian community" in Malaysia.

The film has met with a strong reception since its release, and has been shown at a number of film festivals across the world including the 2005 International Film Festival Rotterdam, the 2005 San Francisco International Film Festival, the 2005 Pusan International Film Festival, Korea; the Barcelona Asian Film Festival, Spain; the Nantes Festival 3 Continents, France and the Fukuoka International Film Festival, Japan among others. In February 2006, it was selected as an official entry to the Bangkok International Film Festival.

== Awards ==
Best Alternative Film, Anugerah Skrin TV3

Special Jury Award, Nantes Festival 3 Continents (2005), France

Opening Film, Asian Film Symposium, Singapore

In Competition, Bangkok Int. Film Festival
