= Coliseum Theatre (Kuala Lumpur) =

Cinema in Kuala Lumpur, Malaysia

- Malay: Panggung Coliseum; Tamil: கொலிசியம் தியேட்டர்
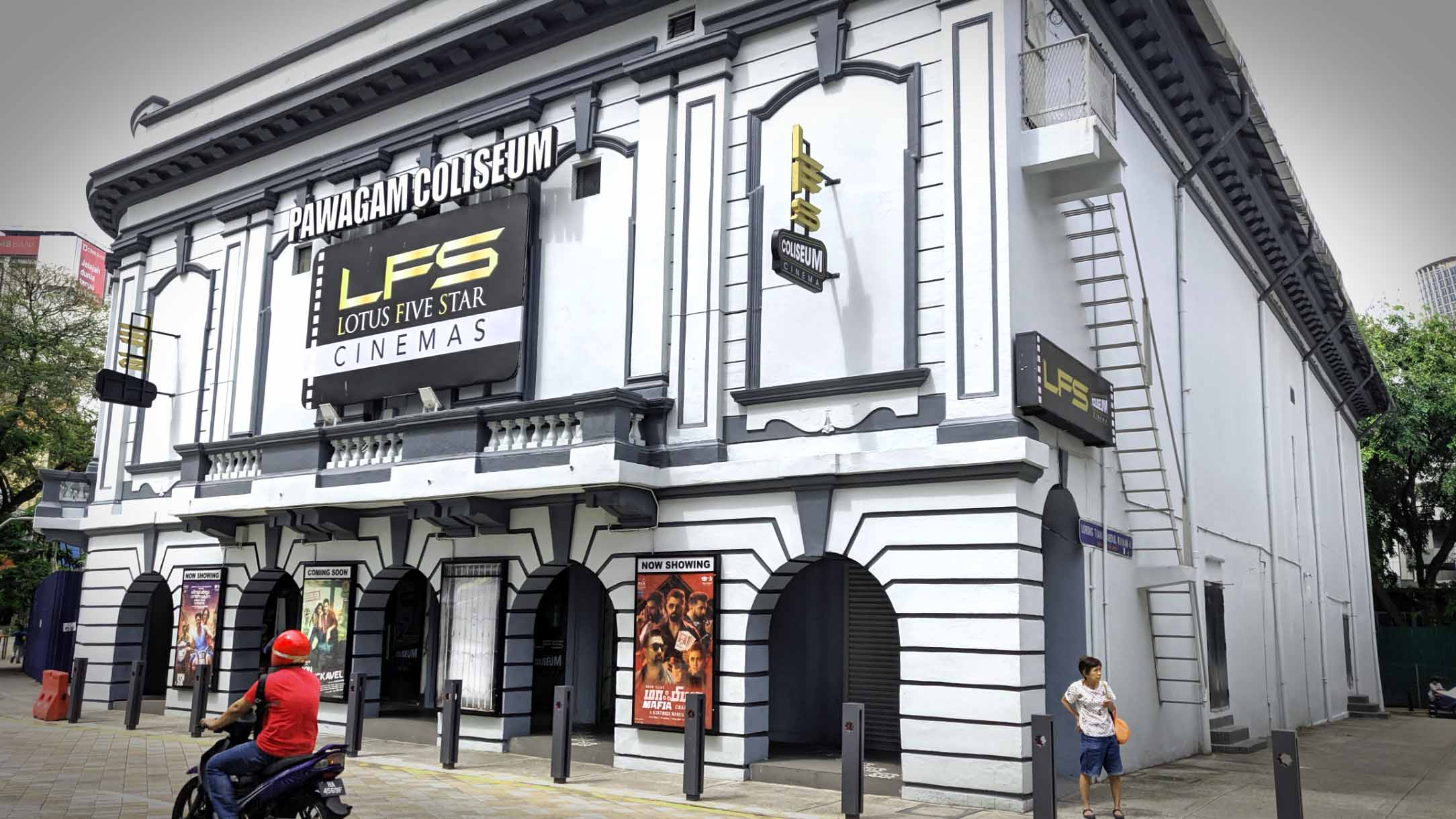
- The Coliseum Theatre in March 2020.
- Interactive map of Coliseum Theatre
- Address: Jalan Tuanku Abdul Rahman; Kuala Lumpur; Malaysia
- Owner: Khor Joo Saik Sdn Bhd
- Capacity: 900 people
- Type: Movie theatre

Construction
- Opened: 1920
- Years active: 98
- Architect: Chua Cheng Bok

The Coliseum Theatre is a cinema in Kuala Lumpur, Malaysia. One of the oldest cinemas in the country, it was built in 1920 by the Chua family led by Chua Cheng Bok.

== History ==
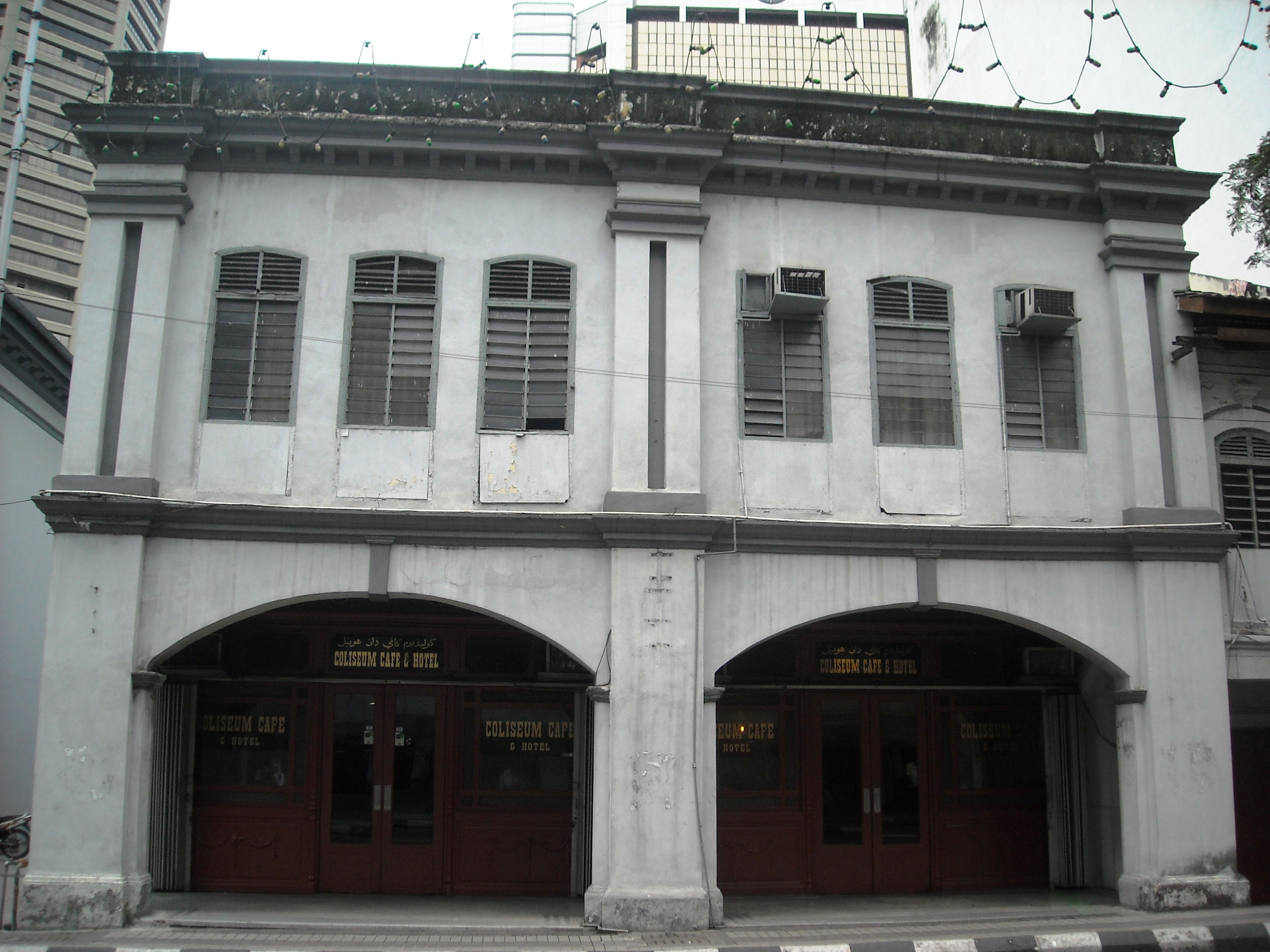
Coliseum Café and Hotel in the adjacent building

The Art Deco-style building is capable of seating 900 people and also features a balcony. The famed Coliseum Café and Hotel—a favourite haunt of William Somerset Maugham during his stay in British Malaya—are located behind the theatre, just down the road. The café closed in 2021 after 100 years in business, due to the COVID-19 pandemic. The oldest and continuously running cinema hall in the country (save for a break during the Japanese occupation during World War II), most of the movies premiering in the building are Indian movies. After Chua Cheng Bok's demise in 1940, his estate continued to administer the Coliseum until its acquisition in 1973 by a company bought by his nephew Dr Chua Boon Teck and his wife Mdm Khor Joo Saik.

In 2006, the Malaysian government proposed to close the theatre and turn it into a cultural heritage centre, but relented when there was a public outcry to the scheme. The government later decided not to close the cinema. Instead, they planned to build a car park nearby.

In that year, Dr Chua Seong Siew, elder son of the late owners Dr Chua Boon Teck and Mdm Khor Joo Saik, successfully appealed for the cinema theatre to remain open, and so it continues to operate to this day.

In 2012, the cinema was owned by Lotus Five Star Cinema (M) Sdn. Bhd. and was transformed into a 2-screen Cineplex which consist of a total 474 seats. The Coliseum Theatre was rebranded as LFS Coliseum Cineplex and was officially opened to the public in November 2012. It has a thriving business showing mostly Bollywood and Tamil/Hindi movies.

== Transportation ==
The theatre is accessible within walking distance south east of Bandaraya LRT Station and Bank Negara KTM station.
