= Geethaiyin Raadhai =

- Poster
- Directed by: Shalini Balasundaram
- Written by: Shalini Balasundaram
- Produced by: Indradevi
- Starring: G. Crak Karnan; Shalini Balasundaram
- Cinematography: Sathish Natarajan
- Music by: Ztish
- Production company: Vikadakavi Production
- Release date: 22 September 2016
- Country: Malaysia
- Language: Tamil
- Box office: RM 529,162

Geethaiyin Raadhai (transl. Gita's Radha) is a 2016 Malaysian Tamil-language romantic drama film directed by Shalini Balasundaram. The film stars G. Crak Karnan and herself and marks the film debuts of Shalini Balasundaram, G. Crak Karnan, and Ztish. It is considered a milestone in the history of Malaysian Tamil cinema.

== Plot ==
Arthi, a carefree young woman is determined to find the perfect boyfriend. Eventually, through her clever tactics she finds and wins over that perfect boyfriend, Ajay, but their relationship falters when he feels controlled and voices his frustrations, leading to a breakup. After their separation, both realize that love is not a game to be dominated but a partnership built on mutual respect.

== Cast ==
- G. Crak Karnan as Ajay
- Shalini Balasundaram as Arthi
- Vicran Elanggoven as Ajay's friend
- K. S. Maniam as Arthi's father
- Gunasekaran as Ajay's father
- Balanraj as Arthi's brother
- Divania as Arthi's friend
- Suvarna as Arthi's friend
- Kannan Rajamanickam as Ajay's college friend

== Production ==
This film marked the feature directorial debut of Shalini Balasundaram, who previously helmed the short film Inai (2015). She met G. Crak Karnan at an award festival and decided to cast him after being impressed by his performance in the short film Netru Aval Irunthaal (2014). The film marked his lead debut in a feature film. Balasundaram wanted another actress to play the role of Arthi, but she ended up playing it herself. Parting from the norm, Balasundaram wanted to showcase a love story from the female perspective. Part of the film was shot in Malacca.

== Soundtrack ==
Music by newcomer Ztish. The songs were released by Junglee Music. To create the song "Ennai Kollathey", Ztish used a tune that he had trashed on his computer in 2010 or 2011. The song was well received and became a popular ringtone song. The popularity of the song made people initially think that the song was an Indian Tamil song. The song has over a hundred million views on YouTube.

Regarding the film's soundtrack, a critic from Varnam wrote that "Ztish’s compositions for the film are filled with memorable melodies that linger in the hearts and minds of the audience. The lyrics of the songs are poignant, reflecting the themes of love, longing, and separation central to the film’s narrative".

Track listing
No.	Title	Lyrics	Singer(s)	Length
1.	"Mellisaye Nee"	Kavi Nayagan Yuwaji	Samhitha Mira	4:38
2.	"Un Kural"	Kavi Nayagan Yuwaji	Kumaresh Kamalakannan, Swarna Deepan Chakkaravarty	5:50
3.	"Un Vizhiyil Paarkiren"	Kavi Nayagan Yuwaji	Jegathisan Nagarajah, Sindhihassne Arumugam	5:18
4.	"Ennai Kollathey"	Kavi Nayagan Yuwaji	Kumaresh Kamalakannan, Keshvini Saravanan	5:26
5.	"Geethaiyin Raadhai Theme"	Meroshana Thaiyalan, Queen	Meroshana Thaiyalan, Queen, Magendran Raman, Kumaresh, Ztish	4:56
Total length:				24:08

== Reception ==
"We were overwhelmed by the unexpected, massive global response to Geethaiyin Raadhai. The film resonated with audiences well beyond Malaysia, and this unexpected reach brought forth a significant sense of responsibility"

— Shalini Balasundaram on the film, 2023

Writing in 2023, a critic from Varnam wrote that "With all these, Geethaiyin Raadhai tends to stand as the memorable film of all time in the Malaysian Tamil cinema industry. This film distinguishes itself among Malaysian films with its unique blend of compelling storytelling, emotional depth, and a remarkable musical score. It resonates with audiences by addressing universal themes while celebrating local talent, cementing its place as a standout in Malaysian cinema". Phoenix Dasan of Selliyal praised the performances of the cast, the songs, the cinematography, and the choreography and called the film a must-watch. Magen of Thendral Media praised the direction, acting, cinematography, and songs and praised the film for redefining Malaysian Tamil cinema.

== Box office ==
The film was a box office success and grossed RM 529,162.

== Accolades ==
Year	Event	Category	Recipient	Ref.
2022	Anugerah MACP	Most Played Tamil Song	Ztish and Kavi Nayagan Yuwaji for "Ennai Kollathey"	
