= Sherry Alhadad =

Malaysian comedian and actress (born 1984)

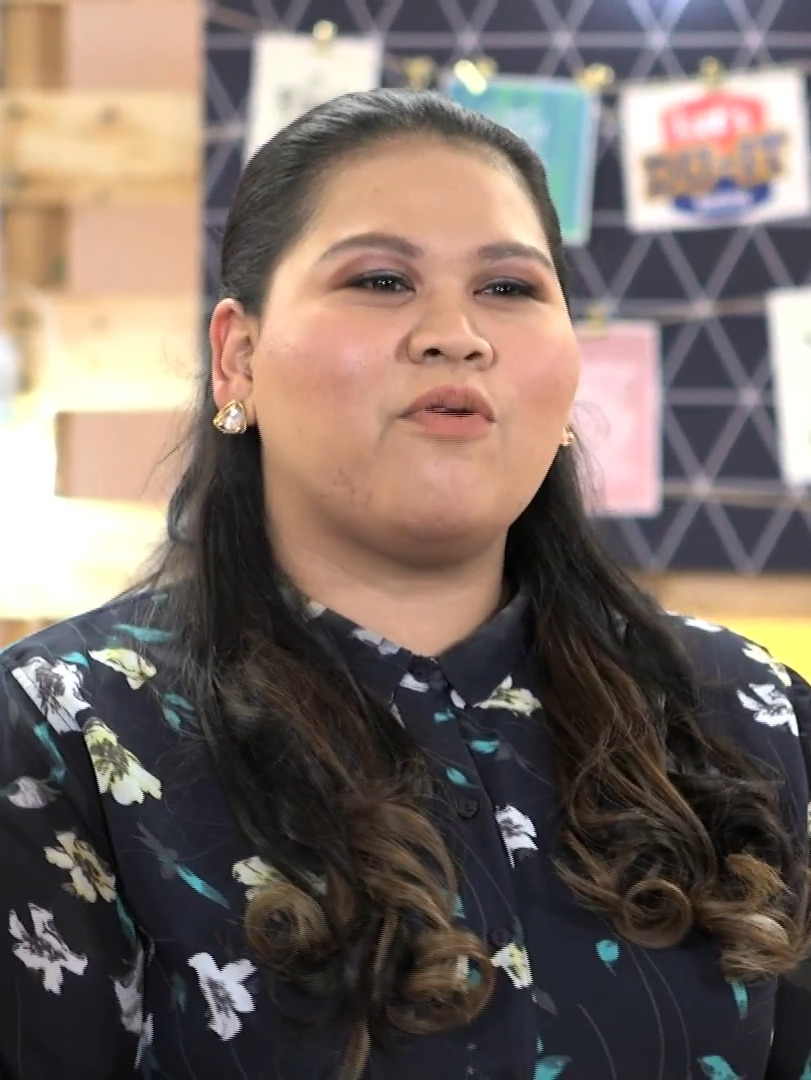
- Sherry in 2016.
- Born: Sharifah Mariam binti Syed Abdullah Al-Hadad; 17 November 1984 (age 41); Sarawak, Malaysia
- Education: Degree in Theatre Performing Arts
- Alma mater: ASWARA National Academy of Arts, Culture & Heritage (ASWARA)
- Occupations: Comedian; Actor; Host Television
- Years active: 2004–present

Sharifah Mariam binti Syed Abdullah Al-Hadad (Jawi: شريفة مريم بنت سيد عبد الله الحداد; born 17 November 1984) or better known as Sherry Alhadad is a Malaysian comedian, actress and television host.

She also lectured at the National Academy of Arts and Heritage (ASWARA) in the field of theater. Sherry studied at ASWARA and was later brought to the acting industry by director Shahrulezad Mohameddin through the telefilm Sutun in 2006. Since then, she has become a comedian and TV host, including hosting the program Melodi. She is popular with Zulin Aziz who both host the talk show on TV9, Diva.

== Early life ==
Sherry Alhadad is of Terengganu descent on her father's side and Sarawak on her mother's side, and has lived in Taman Melati, Selangor, since she was a child. A niece, Sharifah Sakinah, is also an actress and comedian.

She studied at the Theatre Performing Arts Degree level with honours at the National Academy of Arts, Culture and Heritage (Aswara) and taught at the academy.

== Career ==
Her initial involvement in the arts began through the theater Atap Genting Atap Rumbia (2004) directed by Marlia Musa while she was continuing her studies. Theatre was an important step for her. Sherry has acted in theater that has broken the box office, such as a role as Nyonya in Mak Dara Nyonya (2011) and Nyonya & The Gang (2012). Working with director Rosminah Tahir, she worked with famous singers Misha Omar and Amy Mastura in several other similar series of performances. Director Shuhaimi Lua Abdullah was the person responsible for her changing her name after the end of the theater performance of Mak Dara Nyonya. Apart from that, he also appeared in the theatre Asmara-ra All Stars (2014) with Sharifah Amani and Siti Saleha. His most iconic theatre project is the theatre series Projek Disko Baldi with ensembles such as Redza Minhat, Iedil Putra, Sharmaine Othman, Tuan Faisal, Asyraf Zain, Megat Shahrizal and Farah Rani which won a sweet victory at the 10th Cameronian BOH Arts Awards as the winner of the Kakiseni Audience Choice Award for the theatre category. Together with Disko Baldi, they have successfully staged Projek Disko Baldi (2012), PBD: Dreams (2013) and PBD: Muzikal, Boleh Tinggi Lagi (2014). This production was even invited by the 8TV station to produce a similar show of 13 episodes in 2013.

On TV, Sherry has evolved from a supporting actress in Sutun to a more well-known comedy actress. He appeared in the telefilms Rampas (2008), Seratus Harijadi (2010), Nostalgila (2014), the sitcom Oh My English (2014) and the TV series Misiku Kuza (2013–2014). In 2014, Sherry and Zulin took the step of becoming TV hosts when they were invited by the TV3 station to host the Kuala Lumpur Drama Festival Awards 2014 ceremony. Shortly after, the two of them joined forces with Awal Ashaari to host the program Melodi for six months. In January 2015, Sherry and Zulin were given the trust to host their own talk show, Diva-Kelakarama every weeknight. He ventured into singing while doing comedy and parody, namely the reality show Juara Parodi on (Astro Warna) where he teamed up with Zulin Aziz and Zahid of the group Skru.

In 2017, Sherry starred in the drama Misteri Wan Peah which was broadcast on TV3 in the latest slot of Seramedi. In addition, he also hosted Perang Bibir with Dennis Yin on TV9. In addition, Sherry already has her own talk show called The Sherry Show which airs on TV3 starting November 2017. Her career in 2018 began with her hosting the 32nd Song Winner Awards stage with Alif Satar on 11 February. This will be the second time Sherry has teamed up with Alif after successfully hosting the Rockanova concert together in mid-2017.

Also in 2018, Sherry was once again paired with Dennis Yin in the show that entered its 2nd season, which was given a new name, Drop The Beat which was previously known as Perang Bibir and aired on ntv7.

Since 2018, she and Alif have been hosting a singing competition show for new talents, Big Stage. She is currently hosting the show All Together Now Malaysia which airs on Astro Ria starting June 6, 2021.

== Filmography ==
=== Films ===
| Year | Title | Character | Notes |
|---|---|---|---|
| 2013 | Kolumpo | Sherry | First film |
| 2015 | Rembat | Killer | |
| 2016 | My Stupid Boss | Azizah | |
| 2018 | Gol & Gincu Vol. 2 | Dekan Mardiah | |
| 2020 | Bikin Filem | Khaty | |
| 2020 | Saka Nan Sepi | Zaiton | |
| 2021 | Dendam Penunggu | Aunt Tijah | |

=== Drama ===
| Year | Title | Character | TV Channel | Notes |
|---|---|---|---|---|
| 2012 | 7 Ramadan | Chah | TV3 | First drama |
| 2013 | Misiku Kuza | | Astro Ria | |
| 2014–17 | Oh My English! | Cikgu Bedah | Astro TVIQ | Sitcom |
| 2015 | Suami Sebelah Rumah | Anis | TV3 | |
| 2015 | Cik Cinderella dan Encik Tengku | Kak Tim | TV3 | |
| 2016 | Cinta 100kg | Dian | TV3 | |
| 2016 | Ahli Mesyuarat Tingkap | Ira | TV3 | |
| 2017 | Bas Stop | Julie | Astro Warna | Sitcom |
| 2017 | Misteri Wan Peah | Cikgu Zaiton | TV3 | |
| 2021 | The Maid | Suhana | Astro Ria | |
| 2022 | The Maid 2 | Suhana | Astro Ria | |
| 2023 | Famili Yang Popular | Maimun | Astro Ceria | |
| 2023 | B.A.R.I.S.T.A: Misi Terpaling Sulit | Agent M | Astro Ria | |
| 2024 | Khunsa | Zaiton | Astro Ria | Antagonist character |

=== Telefilm ===
| Year | Title | Character | TV Channel | Notes |
|---|---|---|---|---|
| 2006 | Sutun 2 | Yam | Astro Ria | First telefilm |
| 2008 | Rampas | | Astro Ria | |
| 2010 | Seratus Hari Jadi | Ida | Astro Ria | |
| 2010 | Pontianak Kampung Batu | Piah | Astro Ria | |
| 2014 | Oh My English!: Villa Isabellaaa! | Cikgu Bedah | Astro TVIQ | |
| 2014 | Pekerjaan Terbaik | Miss Jue | TV9 | |
| 2014 | Nostalgila | | Astro Mustika HD | |
| 2015 | Aku, Dia dan Tong Gas | Lecturer | TV9 | |
| 2017 | Yam Melaram | Mariam | TV9 | |
| 2018 | Hantu Rumah Sakit Jiwa | Nurse Molly | Astro First Exclusive | Television Film |
| 2019 | Geng | Isabella | Astro First Exclusive | |
| 2019 | Geng Big Stage Beraya | Anggerik | Astro Ria | |
| 2020 | Aku Benci Kpop | Melati | Astro Ria | |
| 2020 | Sally Boss | Sally | Awesome TV | |
| 2021 | Diva From Jakarta | Erin | Astro Citra | |
| 2021 | Delen | Jenny | Astro Citra | |
| 2022 | Peti Ais Mak | Lola | Astro Ria | |

=== Television ===
| Year | Title | As | TV Channel | Notes |
|---|---|---|---|---|
| 2015 | Melodi | Host | TV3 | |
| 2015 | Betul ke Bohong? (Season 6) | Guest Artist | Astro Warna | Episode 13 (Final) |
| 2016 | Extreme Roadtrip | Host | Astro Bella | He hosted with Elfira Loy & Ardell Aryana |
| 2017 | Rockanova 2017 | Host | Astro Prima & Astro Maya HD | hosted with Alif Satar |
| 2017–2021 | The Sherry Show | Host | TV3 | |
| 2018–2022 | Big Stage | Host | Astro Ria | co-hosting Alif Satar |
| 2018 | Drop The Beat | Host | ntv7 | co-hosting Dennis Yin |
| 2018–2019 | Muzik Muzik | Host | TV3 | co-hosting Haziq Hussni |
| 2019 | 33rd Song Winner Awards | Host | TV3 | co-hosting Alif Satar |
| 2019 | Resepi Mak Esah | Host | Astro Ria | co-hosting Mira Filzah |
| 2020–present | MeleTOP | Host | Astro Ria | Guest host |
| 2020 | 34th Song Champion Award | Host | TV3 | co-hosting Awal Ashaari & Haziq Hussni |
| 2021 | 35th Song Champion Award | Host | TV3 | co-hosting Awal Ashaari & Haziq Hussni |
| 2021 | Havoc Nak Raya | Host | TV3 | co-hosting Haziq Hussni |
| 2021 | Betul ke Bohong Kuasa 2? | Host | Astro Warna | Special Edition Episodes 1&4 |
| 2021–2023 | All Together Now Malaysia | Host | Astro Ria | |
| 2022 | Mystery Ranking Show Malaysia | Host | Astro Warna | |
| 2022 | MeleTOP Era Awards 2021 | Host | Astro Ria | co-hosting Nabil Ahmad & Jihan Muse |
| 2022 | 23rd Music Industry Awards | Host | Astro Ria | co-hosting Awal Ashaari & Azad Jasmin |
| 2022 | Gegar Vaganza (season 9) | Host | Astro Ria | Guest host |
| 2023 | 37th Song Winner Awards | Host | TV3 | co-hosting Jihan Muse |
| 2023 | Tonton Anugerah Drama Sangat 2023 | Host | TV3 | co-hosting Sharifah Shahirah |
| 2023 | Mega Spontan | Host | Astro Warna | co-hosting Amir Raja Lawak |
| 2023 | TikTok Awards Malaysia 2023 | Host | TV3 | co-hosted by Izzue Islam and Amelia Henderson |
| 2023 | Battleground Malaysia | Host | Astro Ria | |
| 2023–2024 | The Masked Singer Malaysia (season 4) | Jury | Astro Warna | |
| 2024 | Gempak Most Wanted Awards 2023 | Host | Astro Ria | co-hosted by Zizan Razak, Sean Lee & Amelia Henderson |
| 2024 | 38th Song Winner Awards | Host | TV3 | co-hosted by Alif Satar |
| 2024 | You Know Nothing About Cooking! | Himself | Astro Ria | |
| 2024 | TikTok Live Astro Gimme The Mic Malaysia | Host | Astro Ria | co-host with Sean Lee |
| 2024 | You Know Nothing About Sport | Himself | Astro Ria | |
| 2024 | Call Me Handsome Malaysia Kita | Host | Astro Ria | co-host with Dennis Yin & Sanjna Suri |
| 2024–2025 | Gegar Vaganza (season 11) | Host | Astro Ria | substitute host with Nabil Ahmad until weeks 6–12 |
| 2025 | Gempak Most Wanted Awards 2024 | Host | Astro Ria | co-host with Sean Lee & Amelia Henderson |
| 2025 | Dapur Goodday: Misi Sarimah & Tuyah VS Che Ton | Che Ton | Astro Ria | |
| 2025 | Raise The Star Malaysia | Host | Astro Ria | hosting with Alif Satar |

=== Theater ===
| Year | Title | As | Note |
|---|---|---|---|
| 2004 | Atap Genting Atap Rumbia | | |

=== Siniar ===
| Year | Title | Role |
|---|---|---|
| 2024 | Borak Selebriti | Guest Invitation |

== Awards and nominations ==
| Year | Awards | Category | Category/Nominated work | Results |
|---|---|---|---|---|
| 2018 | 31st Berita Harian Popular Star Award | Popular TV Host | Himself | Nominated |
| 2018 | 31st Berita Harian Popular Star Award | Popular Versatile Artist | Himself | Nominated |
| 2018 | 31st Berita Harian Popular Star Award | Popular Comedy Artist | Himself | Nominated |
| 2020 | 32nd Berita Harian Popular Star Award | Popular Versatile Artist | Himself | Nominated |
| 2020 | 32nd Berita Harian Popular Star Award | Popular Comedy Artist | Himself | Won |
| 2020 | 32nd Berita Harian Popular Star Award | Popular TV Host | Himself | Won |
| 2020 | 2020 Era MeleTOP Award | MeleTOP Host | Big Stage 2 | Nominated |
