= Jason Chong (born 1980) =

Malaysian actor and film director

- Born: Jason Chong Chia Shien; 1980 (age 45–46); Kuala Kangsar, Perak, Malaysia
- Occupations: Actor, director, scriptwriter
- Years active: 2002–now

Jason Chong
- Traditional Chinese: 莊家世恩
- Simplified Chinese: 庄家世恩
Transcriptions
Standard Mandarin
- Hanyu Pinyin: Zhuāngjiā shì ēn

Jason Chong Chia Shien (simplified Chinese: 庄家世恩; traditional Chinese: 莊家世恩; pinyin: Zhuāngjiā shì ēn; born 1980) is a Malaysian actor and film director. As a film director, he is known for his works such as Belukar (2010), Ular (2013) and Dendam Orang Mati (2014). After the film Adiwiraku in which he worked as script writer and executive publisher, Chong Eon the 29th Malaysian Film Festival for the category of Best Original Story.

== Filmography ==
=== Film ===
Year	Title	Credited as				Role	Notes
Year	Title	director	Script writer	Publisher	Actor	Role	Notes
2004	Makar	No	No	No	Yes	Jerry	
2007	Dukun	No	No	No	Yes	Chan	Postponed screening until 2018
2007	Kayangan	No	No	No	Yes	Gary	
2010	Belukar	Yes	Yes	Yes	No	—	First directorial film
2013	Ular	Yes	Yes	No	No	—	
2014	Dendam Orang Mati	Yes	Yes	No	No	—	
2017	Adiwiraku	No	Yes	Yes	No	—	Also as executive publisher
2017	Kau Takdirku	Yes	Yes	No	No	—	
2021	Chomel	Yes	Yes	No	No	—	
2023	Duan Nago Bogho	No	No	No	Yes	Mr. Low	
2023	Coast Guard Malaysia: Ops Helang	No	Yes	No	No	—	
2023	Sumpahan Jerunei	Yes	Yes	No	No	—	
2023	Tebus	Yes	Yes	Yes	Yes	Zul	
2023	Adiwiraku 2: The Gemencheh Boys	Yes	Yes	No	No	—	

=== Drama ===
Year	Title	Credited as		Role	TV channel	Notes
Year	Title	Director	Actor	Role	TV channel	Notes
2001–2002	Spanar Jaya	No	Yes	Michael	NTV7	Guest actor
2002	Insurgensi	No	Yes	Lieutenant Foo Su Ming	TV1	
2006	Badai Pesona Ringgit	No	Yes	Raymond	TV1	
2007	Fara	No	Yes	Jimmy	TV3	
2008	Vice Versa	No	Yes	Alex	TV3	
2009	Bio-Nik	No	Yes	Dr. Haris	TV3	
2011	Keimanan Cinta	No	Yes	Alan	TV9	
2012	Tanah Kubur (Season 4)	No	Yes	Nik	Astro Oasis	Episode: "Lelaki Bukan Muhrim"
2018–2020	The Bridge	Yes	No	—	Viu	26 episodes
2022	Villa Kristal	Yes	No	—	WeTV	Directed together with Kabir Bhatia
2023	Liar	Yes	No	—	Astro Ria	Directed together with Imri Nasution & Lim Siu Min
2023	Entitled	Yes	No	—	Prime Video	
2024	The Secret	Yes	No	—	Viu	
2024	Kayangan	Yes	No	—	Prime Video	
2025	One Cent Thief (season 2)	No	Yes	David	Astro Citra	
2025	Bad Cop	Yes	No	—	Astro Citra	

== Awards and nominations ==
Year	Award	Category	Recipient/nominated work	Results
2010	23rd Malaysian Film Festival	Best Director	Himself	Nominated
2010	23rd Malaysian Film Festival	Hope Director	Himself	Nominated
2010	23rd Malaysian Film Festival	Best Screenplay	Belukar	Nominated
2017	29th Malaysian Film Festival	Best Original Story	Adiwiraku	Won
