= Sharifah Sakinah =

Malaysian comedian, actress and television host

- شريفه سكينه
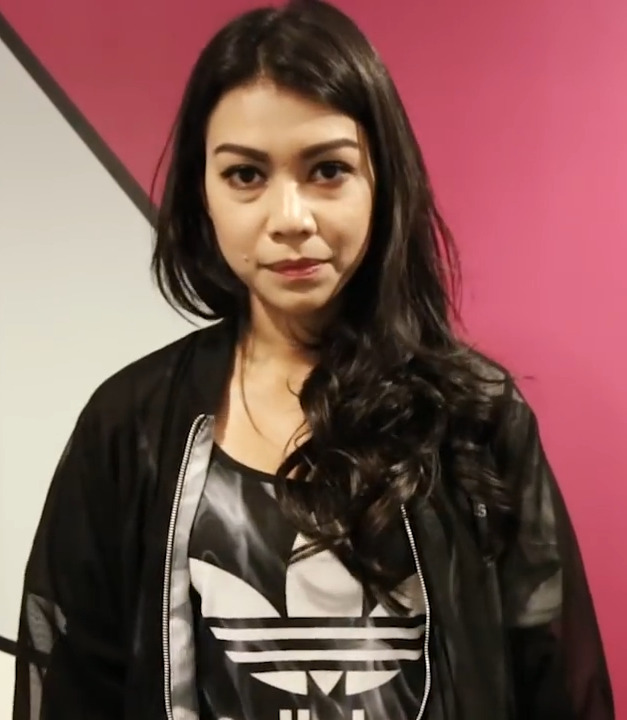
- Sakinah at the MeleTOP studio in October 2015
- Born: Sharifah Nurul Sakinah binti Syed Abu Bakar; 28 May 1989 (age 37); Kuala Lumpur, Malaysia
- Education: Sijil Pelajaran Malaysia (SPM)
- Occupations: Actress; Comedian; Host Television
- Years active: 2010–present
- Height: 178 cm (5 ft 10 in)
- Spouses: Alif Adha Jamil (m. 2015; div. 2020) Michael Hansen (m. 2020; div. 2022)
- Children: Anais Adha Alif Adha (daughter)
- Relatives: Sharifah Haslinda (sister); Sharifah Shahirah (sister); Sherry Alhadad (aunt); Syed Alwi Syed Thahir (grandfather)

Sharifah Nurul Sakinah Syed Abu Bakar (born 28 May 1989; Jawi: شريفه سكينه) is a Malaysian actress, comedian and host, known for her roles in TV and films. Sakinah gained attention through the sitcom Hotel Mania (2010). Since then, she has starred in comedy series such as Bimbi & Bonnie (2013) and Yem Rempit (2014), for which she won the 2014 Color Comedy Awards for the Most Popular Female Comedian category.

Sakinah has also starred in several films, including Ular (2013), Kimchi Untuk Awak (2017) and Rise: Ini Kalilah (2018). She has also starred in a number of TV drama series, including Dendam Sarakit (2012), Benci Vs Cinta (2013), Suamiku Mat Piun (2018) and Voice Note (2019). She is the younger sister of actresses and comedians, Sharifah Haslinda and Sharifah Shahirah.

== Career ==
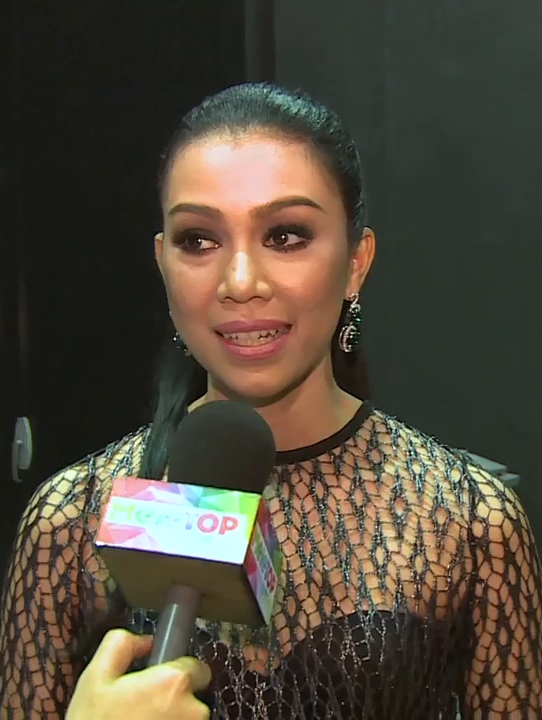
Sakinah was interviewed by MeleTOP at the Anugerah Lawak Warna 2014 on 23 September 2014.

She began her acting career through the musical comedy sitcom Hotel Mania (2010) under the direction of Nizam Zakaria produced by KRU Studios. She then made a name for herself in several comedy series in 2013-2014, namely Bimbi & Bonnie, Havoc Warna and Yem Rempit. The big screen role came when Sakinah starred in her debut film, Ular (2013) directed by Yusry Abdul Halim starring Yusry and Lisa Surihani.

She won the Popular Female Comedian at the 2nd Color Comedy Awards in 2014. That same year, she starred in the telefilm Racun Menantu directed by Michael Ang which had an impact on the audience. At the same time, she also acted in the telefilm Kubur Berdarah in 2015. Her acting was generally praised. She often played other challenging characters in her dramas. He is well received as an actor playing a heavy psycho character, comedy or antagonist.

In 2016, he made his first music video appearance when he appeared in the music video for the song "Andainya Takdir" sung by Anuar Zain. Also starring in the music video is Puteri Balqis. She then acted in the film Pekak starring alongside Zahiril Adzim and Sharifah Amani.

In 2017, Sakinah acted alongside Emma Maembong and Aiman Hakim Ridza by playing the role of Min Ah in the film Kimchi Untuk Awak which was adapted from the 2015 novel of the same title by Suri Ryana. Also starring in the film are Janna Nick and Natasha Elyzza. At the same time, she was paired with Aiman Hakim through the telefilm Girlfriend Aku Dari Neraka and its follow-up TV series, Girlfriend Aku Dari Neraka The Series; she played the role of Lidya.

Sakinah played the role of Nieza in the comedy drama Suamiku Mat Piun on TV3 and as Jasmine in the romantic drama Selafaz Cinta. Sakinah also played the role of a police officer's wife in the political drama film Rise: Ini Kalilah (2018). The following year, in 2019, she acted in the mystery drama Voice Note as Sara. Apart from her, other actors include newcomers, Shasha Abedul and Scha Elinnea. She then appeared in the drama Utusan Cinta Buat Adam by playing the role of Liyana. Sakinah also played the same role in the action film Rise To Power: KLGU (2019).

She plays the role of Laila in the semi-horror drama series Aku Yang Kau Gelar Isteri directed by Shuhaimi Lua Abdullah which airs on TV3. It also stars Lana Nordin and Nadia Brian.

== Personal life ==
Her two older sisters were actresses in the 90s, namely dramatist Sharifah Haslinda and famous comedian Sharifah Shahirah. She was once in a relationship with the eldest son of director Badaruddin Azmi and Erma Fatima, Ahmad Albab, but they broke up midway.

On 28 March 2015, Sakinah married entrepreneur Aliff Adha Jamil in a garden-themed wedding ceremony at the Shangri-La Hotel, Putrajaya. The couple was married by Sakinah's father, Syed Abu Bakar Syed Abdul Rahman Al-Khaired, witnessed by the Imam of the Putra Jaya Regional Mosque, Ustaz Fairuz Suhari. Sakinah received seven trays of gifts and returned nine trays to Aliff.

Sakinah safely gave birth to a baby girl at a medical centre in Kuala Lumpur at 9am, on 24 May 2017. The 3.1 kilogram baby who was born through surgery was named Anais Adha. She previously suffered a miscarriage in early 2016. Sakinah and Aliff Adha's marriage only lasted 5 years when the couple confirmed their divorce in May 2020.

Sakinah revealed in an interview with Utusan Malaysia in November 2017 that she never used any skin care products, instead doing exercise as a way to maintain her health. Her father died on 11 January 2018 due to a lung infection.

In 2018, She revealed that she been diagnosed with ADHD.

She married for the second time to Michael Hansen who is from Sweden, however the date of their wedding is kept secret. The couple tied the knot on March 5, 2021. However, the couple announced their separation in October 2022.

== Filmography ==
=== Films ===
Year	Title	Character	Notes
2013	Ular	Lynn	First film
2016	Pekak	Melur	
2017	Kimchi Untuk Awak	Min Ah @ Minah	
2018	Rise: Ini Kalilah	Isteri Polis	
2019	Rise to Power: KLGU	Liyanna	
2020	Bikin Filem	Yasmin Gamat	
2023	Jemputan Ke Neraka	Rania	
2024	Ngesot	Lisa	
2024	Housekeeping	Molly	
2024	Geng Jin	Ms. Nak	
2025	Qifarah	Mawar	

=== Drama ===
Year	Title	Character	TV channels	Note
2008	Gaia (Season 1)	Hantu Edna	Astro Ria	The first drama Episode: "Eh? Apa pontianak tu? (Part 2)
2010	Hotel Mania		TV3	
2010	Dottie		Astro Ria	
2011	Kelaaas Kau Maria		Astro Ria	
2011	Mata Ayer	Syedah	TV3	
2011	Ana lu'lu	Sophie	TV3	
2012	Dendam Sarakit	Dina	TV3	
2012	Ameera	Suzy	TV3	Guest actors
2012	Senario		TV3	Guest Cast
2012	Dalam Hati Ada Taman	Tasha	Astro Ria	
2012–2013	Terlanjur Cinta	Balkis	TV9	
2013	Tanah Kubur (Season 6)	Yana	Astro Oasis	Episode: "Incest"
2013	Benci Vs Cinta		Astro Ria	
2014	Bunga Merah Punya	Bunga	TV9	
2014	Yem Rempit	Astro Warna		
2015	Jangan Lafazkan Janji		TV1	
2015	Strawberi & Karipap (Season 2)	Cikgu Siti	Astro Ceria	
2016	Isteri Vs Tunang	Amira Irdina	Astro Ria	
2016	Tanah Kubur (Season 15)	Nora	Astro Oasis	Episode: "Janji Syurga"
2017	Perang Otai Andam	Dila	TV3	
2017	Girlfriend Aku Dari Neraka The Series	Lidya	Astro Warna	
2017	My Coffee Prince	Raykal's girlfriend	Astro Ria	Special appearance
2018	Suamiku Mat Piun	Nieza	TV3	
2018	Bimbi & Bonni Misi 007	Bimbi	Astro Warna	
2018	Amira Rose		TV3	
2018	Selafaz Cinta	Jasmine	Astro Prima	
2019	Voice Note	Sarah	TV3	
2019	3 Dara Pingitan	Awa	Astro Warna	
2019	Utusan Cinta Buat Adam	Liyana	TV3	
2020	Isteri Misteri	Yattie	TV3	
2020	KL Gangster: Underworld 2	Liyanna	Iflix	
2021	Aku Yang Kau Gelar Isteri	Laila	TV3	
2022	Hantu Raya Pergi Perang	Manisah	Sooka	
2022	Kampung People 3	Ejen Syukrinah	TV3	Special appearance
2022	Gila Viral	Miss Vivy	Astro Warna	
2023	Jangan Ambil Kerja Tuhan		TV2	
2023	Pendamping	Nora	Tonton	
2024	Terlanjur Cinta	Ayuni	Viu	Guest star
2024	Dr. Pontianak	Edna	Astro Warna	
2024	Curang Tanpa Niat	Astrid	Astro Ria	
2025	Dr. Pontianak 2	Edna	Astro Ria	
2025	Wok	Wok	Unifi TV	

=== Telefilm ===
Year	Title	Character	TV Channel
2012	Ombak Rania	Rozita / Rozie	Astro Ria
2013	Bimbi & Bonnie	Bimbi	Astro Ria
2013	Opah Gangstaq		TV1
2014	Pekerja Terbaik	Ella	TV9
2014	Racun Menantu		Astro Box Office
2015	Chak Ke Chak Boom Boom		Astro Prima
2015	Kubur Berdarah	Sakinah	Astro Ria
2015	Suamiku Encik Beruang		Astro Ria
2016	Dua		Astro Ria
2016	Kulit		Astro Citra
2016	Wau Kasih		Astro Citra
2016	Isteri vs Tunang Raya	Amira Irdina	Astro Ria
2016	Lara Cinta Qaseh	Qaseh	TV2
2016	Redhaku Untukmu	Eli	TV1
2017	Otot-Otot	Fauziah	TV1
2017	Mek Minyak		TV2
2017	Fatonah Azali	Sarina	TV3
2018	Rumah No. 10		Astro Citra
2018	Hantu Rumah Sakit Jiwa	Rita Ora	Astro First Exclusive
2018	Renyai Takbir Raya	Summayyah	Astro Ria
2018	Bini Aku Dari...	Lidya	Astro Warna
2019	Asam Pedas Cendol Sejoli	Kinah	Astro Citra
2019	Cubit-Cubit Cinta	Katarina	Astro Citra
2019	Kecundang Sebelum Menjanda	Nora	Astro Citra
2019	Alamak Boss!!		TV Okey
2021	Kopi & Latte	Nisha	TV2
2021	Epilog: Aku Yang Gelar Isteri	Laila	TV3
2022	Debunk	Edna	Astro Citra
2023	Cucu Wan	Intan	TV3
2023	Debunk Beraya	Edna	Astro Citra
2023	Sumpahan Peti Ais	June	Astro Ria
2025	Cinta Untuk Sekali Lagi Raya	Shibah	Astro Ria

=== Music video ===
Year	Song title	Singer
2014	"Di Pintumu"	Firman AF4
2016	"Andainya Takdir"	Anuar Zain
2017	"Cinta Takkan Berakhir"	Anuar Zain
2018	"Belahan Hati"	Anuar Zain

=== Television ===
Year	Title	Role	TV Channel	Notes
2012	Betul Ke Bohong? (Season 2)	Guest Artist	Astro Warna	Episode 9
2013	Betul Ke Bohong? (Season 4)	Guest Artist	Astro Warna	Episode 13 (Final)
2014	Betul Ke Bohong? (Season 5)	Guest Artist	Astro Warna	Episode 5
2014	#havocwarna	Host	Astro Warna	with AC Mizal, Atu Zero, Along Cham and Rahim R2
2015	Ini Malam Kita Punya	Guest Artist	Astro Warna	
2015	Betul Ke Bohong? (Season 7)	Guest Artist	Astro Warna	Episode 12 (Semi-Final)

== Awards and nominations ==
Year	Award	Category	Recipient/Nominated work	Result
2014	Color Comedy Awards 2nd	Most Popular Female Comedian	Herself	Won
2018	31st Daily News Popular Star Awards	Popular Female TV Actress	Herself	Nominated
2018	31st Daily News Popular Star Awards	Popular Comedy Artist	Herself	Nominated
