= Titiwangsa (federal constituency) =

Constituency of Kuala Lumpur, Malaysia

Titiwangsa (P119)
Kuala Lumpur constituency

Federal constituency
- Legislature: Dewan Rakyat
- MP: Johari Abdul Ghani; BN
- Constituency created: 1984
- First contested: 1986
- Last contested: 2022

Demographics
- Population (2020): 122,096
- Electors (2022): 80,747
- Area (km²): 15
- Pop. density (per km²): 8,139.7

Titiwangsa is a federal constituency in the Federal Territory of Kuala Lumpur, Malaysia, that has been represented in the Dewan Rakyat since 1986.

The federal constituency was created in the 1984 redistribution and is mandated to return a single member to the Dewan Rakyat under the first past the post voting system.

== Demographics ==
Ethnic breakdown of Titiwangsa's electorate as of 2018
1. Malay (73.4%)
2. Chinese (16.5%)
3. Indian (8.80%)
4. Other ethnicities (1.30%)
Age breakdown of Titiwangsa's electorate as of 2022
1. 18-20 (4.80%)
2. 21-29 (17.4%)
3. 30-39 (20.7%)
4. 40-49 (17.1%)
5. 50-59 (17.1%)
6. 60-69 (14.2%)
7. 70-79 (6.18%)
8. 80-89 (1.90%)
9. above 90 (0.63%)
Gender breakdown of Titiwangsa's electorate as of 2022
1. Male (49.8%)
2. Female (50.2%)

== History ==
=== Polling districts ===
According to the gazette issued on 30 October 2022, the Titiwangsa constituency has a total of 20 polling districts.

Polling District	Code	Location
Setapak Selatan	119/00/01	SJK (C) Chiao Nan
Kompleks Damai	119/00/02	SK Jalan Kuantan 2
Jalan Raja Muda	119/00/03	SK Jalan Raja Muda
Kampong Bharu Utara	119/00/04	SK Kampung Bahru
Kampong Bharu Tengah	119/00/05	SMK Puteri Wilayah
Kampong Bahru Selatan	119/00/06	SRA Raja Muda Musa
Datuk Keramat Utara	119/00/07	SK Jalan Gurney 1; SK Jalan Gurney 2
Datuk Keramat Tengah	119/00/08	SRA Al-Alusi (SRA Datuk Keramat)
Datuk Keramat Selatan	119/00/09	SK Datok Keramat 1; SK Datok Keramat 2
Datuk Keramat Seberang	119/00/10	SJK (C) Chung Hwa 'P'
Jalan Ampang	119/00/11	SMK Puteri Ampang
Jalan Mengkudu	119/00/12	SMK Seri Ampang
Desa Pandan	119/00/13	SK Desa Pandan
Kelab Golf Selangor	119/00/14	SK Taman Maluri
Taman Maluri	119/00/15	SMK Taman Maluri
Kampung Pandan Dalam	119/00/16	SK Tun Hussein Onn
Kampung Pandan Tengah	119/00/17	SJK (C) Tsun Jin
Jalan Cochrane	119/00/18	SK Cochrane Perkasa
Kampung Pandan Luar	119/00/19	SMK Cochrane Perkasa
Jalan Jejaka	119/00/20	SK Cochrane

=== Representation history ===
Members of Parliament for Titiwangsa
Parliament	No	Years	Member	Party	Vote Share
Constituency created from Setapak
7th	P098	1986–1990	Suleiman Mohamed (سليمان محمد)	BN (UMNO)	20,976; 60.99%
8th	P098	1990–1995	Suleiman Mohamed (سليمان محمد)	BN (UMNO)	27,189; 64.27%
9th	P107	1995–1999	Suleiman Mohamed (سليمان محمد)	BN (UMNO)	25,545; 79.52%
10th	P107	1999–2004	Suleiman Mohamed (سليمان محمد)	BN (UMNO)	18,624; 52.12%
11th	P119	2004–2008	Astaman Abdul Aziz (أستامن عبدالعزيز)	BN (UMNO)	22,910; 67.37%
12th	P119	2008–2011	Lo' Lo' Mohamad Ghazali (لُؤْلُؤْ مُحَمَّد غَزَالِي)	PR (PAS)	17,857; 52.92%
12th	P119	2011–2013	Vacant (Note: Vacant from 17 July 2011 until the 2013 Malaysian general election due to the incumbent died in office. No by-election was held due to the next general election was less than 2 years away.)		
13th	P119	2013–2018	Johari Abdul Ghani (جوهري عبدالغني)	BN (UMNO)	23,034; 50.96%
14th	P119	2018–2020	Rina Harun (رينا هارون)	PH (BERSATU)	23,840; 47.31%
14th	P119	2020–2022	Rina Harun (رينا هارون)	PN (BERSATU)	23,840; 47.31%
15th	P119	2022–present	Johari Abdul Ghani (جوهري عبدالغني)	BN (UMNO)	25,042; 41.15%

=== Historical boundaries ===
Federal constituency	Area			
Federal constituency	1984	1994	2003	2018
Titiwangsa	Ayer Panas; Datuk Keramat; Kampung Baru; Kampung Pandan; Taman Tasik Titiwangsa	Datuk Keramat; Kampung Baru; Kampung Pandan; Maluri; Taman Tasik Titiwangsa	Ampang Hilir; Datuk Keramat; Kampung Baru; Kampung Pandan; Maluri	

=== Local governments & postcodes ===
No.	Local Government	Postcode
P119	Kuala Lumpur City Hall	50300, 50400, 50450, 50586, 53000, 54000, 54100, 55000, 55100 Kuala Lumpur

== Election results ==
Malaysian general election, 2022
Party	Candidate	Votes	%	∆%
BN	Johari Abdul Ghani	25,042	41.15	▲2.05
PH	Khalid Abdul Samad	20,410	33.54	▲33.54
PN	Rosni Adam	15,418	23.86	▲23.85
GTA	Khairuddin Abu Hassan	888	1.46	▲1.46
Total valid votes		60,858	100.00	
Total rejected ballots		357		
Unreturned ballots		235		
Turnout		61,450	76.10	▼6.46
Registered electors		80,747		
Majority		4,632	7.61	▼0.60
BN gain from PKR		Swing		?
Source(s) https://lom.agc.gov.my/ilims/upload/portal/akta/outputp/1753271/PUB%20613%20(2022)%20-%20PARLIMEN%20WP%20KUALA%20LUMPUR.pdf

Malaysian general election, 2018
Party	Candidate	Votes	%	∆%
PH	Rina Mohd Harun	23,840	47.31	▲47.31
BN	Johari Abdul Ghani	19,701	39.10	▼11.86
PAS	Mohamad Noor Mohamad	6,845	13.59	▼35.45
Total valid votes		50,386	100.00	
Total rejected ballots		323		
Unreturned ballots		149		
Turnout		50,858	82.56	▲0.02
Registered electors		61,598		
Majority		4,139	8.21	▲6.29
PKR gain from BN		Swing		?
Source(s) "His Majesty's Government Gazette - Notice of Contested Election, Parliament for the Federal Territory of Kuala Lumpur [P.U. (B) 240/2018]" (PDF). Attorney General's Chambers of Malaysia. 3 May 2018. "Federal Government Gazette - Results of Contested Election and Statements of the Poll after the Official Addition of Votes, Parliamentary Constituencies for the Federal Territory of Kuala Lumpur [P.U. (B) 314/2018]" (PDF). Attorney General's Chambers of Malaysia. 28 May 2018.

Malaysian general election, 2013
Party	Candidate	Votes	%	∆%
BN	Johari Abdul Ghani	23,034	50.96	▲3.88
PAS	Ahmad Zamri Asa'ad Khuzaimi	22,168	49.04	▼3.88
Total valid votes		45,202	100.00	
Total rejected ballots		311		
Unreturned ballots		118		
Turnout		45,631	82.54	▲14.53
Registered electors		55,282		
Majority		866	1.92	▼3.92
BN gain from PAS		Swing		?
Source(s) "Federal Government Gazette - Notice of Contested Election, Parliament for the Federal Territory of Kuala Lumpur [P.U. (B) 177/2013]" (PDF). Attorney General's Chambers of Malaysia. 26 April 2013. "Federal Government Gazette - Results of Contested Election and Statements of the Poll after the Official Addition of Votes, Parliamentary Constituencies for the Federal Territory of Kuala Lumpur [P.U. (B) 218/2013]" (PDF). Attorney General's Chambers of Malaysia. 22 May 2013. Archived from the original (PDF) on 2018-10-02.

Malaysian general election, 2008
Party	Candidate	Votes	%	∆%
PAS	Lo' Lo' Mohamad Ghazali	17,857	52.92	▲20.29
BN	Aziz Jamaludin Mhd Tahir	15,885	47.08	▼20.29
Total valid votes		33,742	100.00	
Total rejected ballots		191		
Unreturned ballots				
Turnout		33,933	68.01	▲0.76
Registered electors		49,892		
Majority		1,972	5.84	▼28.90
PAS gain from BN		Swing		?

Malaysian general election, 2004
Party	Candidate	Votes	%	∆%
BN	Astaman Abdul Aziz	22,910	67.37	▲15.25
PAS	Mohamad Noor Mohamad	11,095	32.63	▼15.25
Total valid votes		34,005	100.00	
Total rejected ballots		189		
Unreturned ballots		786		
Turnout		34,980	67.25	▼0.25
Registered electors		52,014		
Majority		11,815	34.74	▲30.50
BN hold		Swing		

Malaysian general election, 1999
Party	Candidate	Votes	%	∆%
BN	Suleiman Mohamed	18,624	52.12	▼27.40
PAS	Mohamad Noor Mohamad	17,111	47.88	▲27.40
Total valid votes		35,735	100.00	
Total rejected ballots		264		
Unreturned ballots		246		
Turnout		36,245	67.50	▲6.94
Registered electors		53,696		
Majority		1,513	4.24	▼54.80
BN hold		Swing		

Malaysian general election, 1995
Party	Candidate	Votes	%	∆%
BN	Suleiman Mohamed	25,545	79.52	▲15.25
PAS	Othman Ngah	6,579	20.48	▲20.48
Total valid votes		32,124	100.00	
Total rejected ballots		341		
Unreturned ballots		346		
Turnout		32,811	60.56	▼6.89
Registered electors		54,179		
Majority		18,966	59.04	▲30.50
BN hold		Swing		

Malaysian general election, 1990
Party	Candidate	Votes	%	∆%
BN	Suleiman Mohamed	27,179	64.27	▲3.28
S46	Harun Idris	15,108	35.73	▲35.73
Total valid votes		42,287	100.00	
Total rejected ballots		1,542		
Unreturned ballots		0		
Turnout		43,829	67.45	▲12.01
Registered electors		64,980		
Majority		12,071	28.54	▼5.70
BN hold		Swing		

Malaysian general election, 1986
Party	Candidate	Votes	%
BN	Suleiman Mohamed	20,976	60.99
DAP	Yee Kai Wah	9,199	26.75
PAS	Abbas Alias	4,215	12.26
Total valid votes		34,390	100.00
Total rejected ballots		267	
Unreturned ballots		0	
Turnout		34,657	55.44
Registered electors		62,511	
Majority		11,777	34.24
This was a new constituency created.
