= Malaysian Kalai Ulagam Awards =

Malaysian online awards

Malaysia Kalai Ulagam Awards
- Awarded for: Outstanding achievements within the Malaysian Indian Entertainment Scene
- Country: Malaysia
- Presented by: Malaysia Kalai Ulagam
- First award: 2015
- Website: Malaysia Kalai Ulagam

Television/radio coverage
- Network: YouTube

Malaysia Kalai Ulagam Award or acronym known as MUK Award is the Malaysian online award ceremony to pay tribute and award the key industry player within Malaysian Indian community who have been working hard to keep the local entertainment industry of Malaysia alive. This award were presented by online entertainment show, Malaysia Kalai Ulagam. The 2016 awards were held on 25 February.

== Categories ==
Most Popular and lifetime awards.	Movie Category
Most Popular Artiste; Lifetime Achievement Award	Best Movie; Best Actor; Best Actress; Best Male Supporting Actor; Best Female Supporting Actress; Best Male Newcomer; Best Female Newcomer; Best Comedian; Best Lyrics writer; Best Music Director; Best Director; Best Male Singer; Best Female Singer; Best Song; Best Cinematographer; Best Stunt Master; Best Editor
Telemovie and DVD category	Short Movie category
Best Telemovie; Best Actor; Best Actress; Best Male Supporting Actor; Best Female Supporting Actress; Best Music Director; Best Director; Best Cinematographer	Best Short Movie; Best Actor; Best Actress; Best Male Supporting Actor; Best Lyrics writer; Best Music Director; Best Director; Best Song; Best Cinematographer; Best Video Song

== Winners ==
=== 2015:1st MKU Awards ===
- Most Popular Artiste: Denes Kumar
- Lifetime Achievement Award: K. S. Maniam

==== Movie category ====
- Best Movie: Vennira Iravuggal
- Best Actor: Aghonthiran (Kaithiyin Agarathi)
- Best Actress: Sangeeta Krishnasamy (Vennira Iravuggal)
- Best Male Supporting Actor: Thangamani (Vetti Pasanga)
- Best Female Supporting Actress: Malarvizhi Shanmugam (Vetti Pasanga)
- Best Male Newcomer: Rabbit Mac (Maindhan)
- Best Female Newcomer: Shaila Nair (Maindhan)
- Best Comedian: Gana (Victory)
- Best Lyrics writer: Yuwaji (Ore Oru Sollil – Vetti Pasanga)
- Best Music Director : Lawrence Soosai (Vennira Iravuggal)
- Best Director: R. Perakas (Vennira Iravuggal)
- Best Male Singer: Dhilip Varman (En Uyire – Vetti Pasanga)
- Best Female Singer: Renuka Shree (Ore Oru Sollil – Vetti Pasanga)
- Best Song: Azhagana Pani Katru (Victory)
- Best Cinematographer: Mano V.Narayanan (Vennira Iravuggal)
- Best Stunt Master: Ruben (Victory)
- Best Editor: Prem Nath (Maindhan)

==== Telemovie and DVD category ====
- Best Telemovie: Unarvu
- Best Actor: Haridhass (Unarvu)
- Best Actress: Sangeeta Krishnasamy (Unarvu)
- Best Male Supporting Actor: Suthagar (Otrumai Paalam)
- Best Female Supporting Actress: R. Kaameshaa (Unarvu)
- Best Music Director: Jamez Raj (Horoscopes)
- Best Director: S.Shashitharan (Unarvu)
- Best Cinematographer: Uthaya Kumar Palani (Unarvu)

==== Short Movie category ====
- Best Short Movie: Arinthum Ariyamalum
- Best Actor: Karnan G Crack (Netru Aval Irunthal)
- Best Actress: Aahmuu Thirunyanam (Aval Oru Pen)
- Best Male Supporting Actor: Mahessan Poobalan (Netru Aval Irunthal)
- Best Lyrics writer: Ooviya Ummapathi (Idhayam – Arai En 3010)
- Best Music Director: Jey Raghavendra (Nallathor Veenai Seithen)
- Best Director: Viknish Lokarag (Arinthum Ariyamalum & Netru Aval Irunthal)
- Best Song: Ithayam Vali Thanggave (Arai En 3010)
- Best Cinematographer: Ravyn Manogaran (Arinthum Ariyamalum)
- Best Video Song: Adiyeh Kirukki

==== Hosts ====
- Best Male TV Anchor: Denes Kumar (Astro)
- Best Female TV Anchor: Ahila (Vizhuthugal)
- Best Male Radio Host: Theyvekgan Thamaraichelven (Minnal FM)
- Best Female Radio Host: Revathy (THR Raaga)
