= Sekolah Menengah Kebangsaan Aminuddin Baki, Kuala Lumpur =

- Sekolah Menengah Kebangsaan Aminuddin Baki, Kuala Lumpur

Location
- Jalan Kampung Pandan; Kuala Lumpur, Federal Territory, Malaysia
- 3°08′25″N 101°43′40″E

Information
- Type: Public (Premier School)
- Motto: Pelajaran Panduan Hidup (Education Guides Life)
- Established: 1958
- Headmaster: Puan Nor Haida Binti Hamdan
- Houses: Temenggung, Bendahara, Laksamana, Syahbandar
- Website: www.sabkl.edu.my (dead since 21 Nov 2015)

Aminuddin Baki National Secondary School, Kuala Lumpur (Malay: Sekolah Menengah Kebangsaan Aminuddin Baki, Kuala Lumpur) is a high performance school located along Jalan Kampung Pandan, Kuala Lumpur. Established in 1958, approximately 1200 students from Form 1 to Form 5 pursue their secondary education here. The school is also known by its abbreviation SABKL and its students are known as SABians.

== History ==
- 1958
- Initially established as Sekolah Menengah Melayu, Kuala Lumpur (Malay Secondary School).
- Temporarily located at the Kampung Baru & Maxwell Primary Schools.
- 1963
- Moved to a new temporary location at the Cochrane Secondary School.
- 1964
- 24 March, moved to the present-day location & changed her name to S.M.K. Aminuddin Baki (Aminuddin Baki National Secondary School).
- 1966
- Form 6 classes have been introduced.
- 1987
- It was categorised under Controlled Schools.
- 1997
- A Daily Hostel was built for students KRK Federal Territory of Kuala Lumpur.
- 1998
- Pioneer School TDKT (Tenaga Diperbaharui & Kecekapan Tenaga)
- 1999
- Pioneer Smart School.
- 2005
- Offers French language lesson for all students.
- 2006
- Sekolah Projek Rintis Sumber Persiaran Terbuka (Open Source Software).
- Pioneer Programme of Microsoft Partners in Learning.
- 2007
- 30 March, proclaimed Cluster School.
- 2010
- Proclaimed High Performance School

== Notable alumni ==
SABKL has produced successful people in various fields. Among them are:

- Rozali Ismail - Executive Chairman Puncak Niaga Sdn Bhd
- Datuk Seri Johari Abdul Ghani - Minister of Investment, Trade and Industry
- Noh Omar - Former Cabinet Minister
- Yusof Haslam - Actor, film director, film producer and businessman
- Siti Zainon Ismail - Sasterawan Negara ke 18
- Mira Filzah - Actress, Businesswoman

== In popular culture ==
- Featured in Gerak Khas in a few episodes about bullying
- Featured in Sembilu (drama) TV2 drama 2003-2005
