= Chermaine Poo =

Malaysian actress, host (born 1978)

- Born: Chermaine Poo; October 1, 1978 (age 46); Kuala Lumpur, [alaysia
- Height: 5 ft 5 in (1.65 m)
- Beauty pageant titleholder
- Hair color: Dark Brown
- Eye color: Brown

Chermaine Poo (born October 1, 1978) is a Malaysian actress, emcee and TV host.

Chermaine is a qualified Chartered Accountant ("CA") by profession, having three accountancy qualifications under her belt. She graduated with a double major degree, BA (Hons) in Accounting & Finance, UK at the age of 19.

Chermaine owns the company Chermaine Poo Productions and was named "Emerging Woman of the Year" in 2012 by the prestigious international accounting firm.

== Qualifications ==
Chermaine is a Chartered Accountant ("CA") by profession. She is a member of the Malaysian Institute of Accountants, as well as the Association of Chartered Certified Accountants (UK).

== Career ==
=== Corporate finance ===
- Trained with the largest investment bank in Malaysia; and
- Big Five international accounting firm
- Involved in preparing IPOs, restructuring, receivership and setting up a billion-ringgit infrastructure fund

=== Beauty pageantry ===
Chermaine was a second runner-up in the Miss Universe Malaysia 2005, where she also won three subsidiary titles – Miss Beautiful, Miss Natural Beauty and Miss Crowning Glory.

=== Acting ===
Chermaine has acted in numerous Malaysian movies and local dramas.

==== Movies ====
- Culik
- Jin Notti (with Mawi, Fara Fauzana)
- The Funeral Party
- London Calling
- Lust! Caution (Directed by Ang Lee)
- DUKUN
- Kurnia
- Orange for Mama

==== Dramas ====
- Bait Cinta](Erra Shazira)
- Tudung Express (with Lisa Surihani, Julia Ziegler, Linda Hashim)
- Pertama Ramadan Akan Datang
- Timeless Season
- The Beginning
- Anak Pontianak
- Malaysian Talents.Com

=== TV hosting ===
Chermaine hosts her own weekly TV programme on The Breakfast Show called "Mind Your Money with Chermaine Poo" as well as "Miracle Makers" on NTV7.

Other TV programmes that she has hosted, among others, are:

- Motorcross Championship 2008–2012
- Asian Festival of Speed 2008–2012
- Dapur Nyonya on TV3 with Chef Florence
- The Breakfast Show – 2009–2012 on NTV7

=== Writing ===
Chermaine contributes regularly to The Star newspaper in her weekly column, "Mind Your Money with Chermaine Poo"

=== Emceeing ===
Since starting in 2007, Chermaine has emceed countless events, ranging from but not limited to:

- Foreign language
- Corporate
- Protocol
- Annual dinner
- Fashion and lifestyle
- Fashion shows
- Luxury brands
- Electronic gadgets
- Pageantry
- Hair, make-up and fragrances
- Film festivals
- Awards ceremonies
- Motorsports
- Food and beverage
- Property
- Health/fitness and sports

== Philanthropy ==
Chermaine actively runs her charity, "Chermaine Poo’s Cupcakes for Charity", which was founded in December 2011. She has also been involved in many charity events and environmental awareness initiatives, among others:

- World Aids Day
- MAC Aids Fund
- Cleaner, Greener Penang Campaign
- Tabung Pulih Kasih
- Save the Fins with KLCC Aquaria
- Earth Hour with Sunway Pyramid 2008–2012
- Project Liber8 (Stop Human Trafficking)

== Public image ==
"Chermaine Poo - Chartered Accountant, Car Chick, Cupcake Connoisseur" Over the years, the media and entertainment industry have described her as:

1. A Beauty with Brains
2. A highly qualified Chartered Accountant turned Actress/Emcee/TV Host
3. A young and successful professional;
- Who has wide corporate, social and media contacts
- Who comes from a loving and close-knit family
- Who promotes good moral values, ethics and a healthy lifestyle
1. And now, "Beauty and Brains with a Heart".
