= Johari Abdul Ghani =

Malaysian politician and chartered accountant

Yang Berhormat Datuk Seri Johari Abdul Ghani PJN SMW DSIS MP
- جوهري عبدالغني

Minister of Investment, Trade and Industry
- Incumbent
- Assumed office 17 December 2025
- Monarch: Ibrahim Iskandar
- Prime Minister: Anwar Ibrahim
- Deputy: Sim Tze Tzin
- Preceded by: Tengku Zafrul Aziz
- Constituency: Titiwangsa

Minister of Plantation and Commodities
- In office 12 December 2023 – 17 December 2025
- Monarchs: Abdullah (2023–2024); Ibrahim Iskandar (2024–2025)
- Prime Minister: Anwar Ibrahim
- Deputy: Chan Foong Hin
- Preceded by: Fadillah Yusof
- Succeeded by: Noraini Ahmad
- Constituency: Titiwangsa

Minister of Natural Resources, Energy and Climate Change
- Acting
- In office 11 July 2025 – 17 December 2025
- Monarch: Ibrahim Iskandar
- Prime Minister: Anwar Ibrahim
- Deputy: Huang Tiong Sii
- Preceded by: Nik Nazmi Nik Ahmad
- Succeeded by: Arthur Joseph Kurup
- Constituency: Titiwangsa

Treasurer-General of the Barisan Nasional
- Incumbent
- Assumed office 27 April 2023
- Chairman: Ahmad Zahid Hamidi
- Preceded by: Hishammuddin Hussein

Vice President of the United Malays National Organisation
- Incumbent
- Assumed office 18 March 2023 Serving with: Wan Rosdy Wan Ismail &; Mohamed Khaled Nordin
- President: Ahmad Zahid Hamidi
- Preceded by: Mahdzir Khalid

Chairman of the Asset Recovery Task Force on the 1Malaysia Development Berhad scandal
- Incumbent
- Assumed office 10 March 2023
- Monarchs: Abdullah (2023–2024); Ibrahim Iskandar (since 2024)
- Prime Minister: Anwar Ibrahim

Minister of Finance II
- In office 27 June 2016 – 10 May 2018 Serving with Najib Razak (Minister of Finance)
- Monarchs: Abdul Halim (2016); Muhammad V (2016–2018)
- Prime Minister: Najib Razak
- Deputy: Othman Aziz; Lee Chee Leong
- Preceded by: Ahmad Husni Hanadzlah
- Succeeded by: Amir Hamzah Azizan
- Constituency: Titiwangsa

Deputy Minister of Finance
- In office 29 July 2015 – 27 June 2016 Serving with Chua Tee Yong
- Monarch: Abdul Halim
- Prime Minister: Najib Razak
- Minister: Najib Razak (Minister of Finance); Ahmad Husni Hanadzlah (Minister of Finance II)
- Preceded by: Ahmad Maslan
- Succeeded by: Othman Aziz
- Constituency: Titiwangsa

Chairman of the UDA Holdings Berhad
- In office 8 July 2013 – 28 July 2015
- Minister: Najib Razak
- Preceded by: Nur Jazlan Mohamed
- Succeeded by: Mohd Shafei Abdullah

Member of the Malaysian Parliament for Titiwangsa
- Incumbent
- Assumed office 19 November 2022
- Preceded by: Rina Harun (PH–BERSATU)
- Majority: 4,632 (2022)
- In office 5 May 2013 – 9 May 2018
- Preceded by: Lo' Lo' Mohamad Ghazali (PAS)
- Succeeded by: Rina Harun (PH–BERSATU)
- Majority: 866 (2013)

Personal details
- Born: Johari bin Abdul Ghani; 6 March 1964 (age 62) Kampung Pandan, Kuala Lumpur, Selangor (now Federal Territory of Kuala Lumpur), Malaysia
- Citizenship: Malaysia
- Party: United Malays National Organisation (UMNO) (1988–present)
- Other political affiliations: Barisan Nasional (BN) (1998–present)
- Spouse(s): Zurwati Haslinda Zainal Bahry, Nor Fairos Mohd Nasib
- Children: Amir Nashrin Johari
- Education: Universiti Teknologi MARA (Dip)
- Occupation: Politician
- Profession: Chartered accountant

Johari bin Abdul Ghani (Jawi: جوهري بن عبدالغني; Malay pronunciation: [johari]; born 6 March 1964), more commonly known as Dato' Jo, is a Malaysian politician and chartered accountant who has served as Minister of Investment, Trade and Industry in the Unity Government administration under Prime Minister Anwar Ibrahim since December 2025 and the Member of Parliament (MP) for Titiwangsa from May 2013 to May 2018 and again since November 2022. He served as the Minister of Plantation and Commodities in the Unity Government administration under Prime Minister Anwar from December 2023 to December 2025. He is a member of the United Malays National Organisation (UMNO), a component party of the BN coalition. He has served as the Treasurer General of BN since April 2023 and one of the Vice Presidents of UMNO since March 2023. He is also presently the only BN MP in Klang Valley.

== Early life and education ==
Johari bin Abdul Ghani was born and raised in Kampung Pandan, Kuala Lumpur (then in Selangor, now Federal Territory of Kuala Lumpur). He received his primary school education at Sekolah Rendah Kebangsaan Kampung Pandan from 1971 to 1976 and pursued his studies at Sekolah Menengah Aminuddin Baki in Kampung Pandan from 1977 until 1981. He continued his tertiary education at Institut Teknologi MARA (ITM), Shah Alam from 1982 until 1985 and obtained his Diploma in Accounting. He then furthered his accounting studies in the United Kingdom, which qualified him for a membership to the Association of Chartered Certified Accountants (ACCA) in 1988 and awarded Fellowship of the Chartered Association of Certified Accountants in 1993.

== Accounting career ==
Johari started his career at an international accounting firm, Peat Marwick & Co. (now part of KPMG) as an auditor. Johari was active in the corporate world for more than 25 years. He held several senior positions, including group managing director and chairman in several companies, both listed and unlisted in the Kuala Lumpur Stock Exchange. He also held positions as managing directors of companies involved in the fast-food industries, manufacturing and agriculture.

Johari is active in various social and community services. He was appointed chairman of ‘Jawatankuasa Pemakanan Negara’ at the Ministry of Agriculture and Agro-based Industry. He was also a member of ‘Lembaga Pelawat Hospital Kuala Lumpur’ and member of ‘Jawatankuasa Badan Amal & Aduan Rakyat Wilayah Persekutuan’.

Moreover, Johari sits on the Malaysia Economic Council. The council, which is chaired by the Prime Minister of Malaysia, is responsible, among others, to formulate strategies to sustain the economic growth of Malaysia through foreign direct investment and domestic investments for the country and to monitor and analyze trends in the development of both global and domestic economy in order to formulate specific actions to spur the Malaysian economic growth.

Johari was also a member of the board of directors of Khazanah Nasional Berhad, the sovereign wealth fund of the Government of Malaysia. He is also the chairman of the Langkawi Development Authority (LADA), a government agency responsible for the development of the Langkawi Island as an international tourist destination. Johari was formerly the chairman of UDA Holdings Berhad, a government linked company that is involved in urban development. Johari is a member of the board of trustees for the Yayasan Pelaburan Bumiputera, the parent company of Permodalan Nasional Berhad which manages more than RM250 billion unit trust funds in Malaysia. Johari is active in the Yayasan Peneraju Pendidikan Bumiputera (YPPB) where he serves on the board of trustees. The YPPB is a strategic unit under the Prime Minister's Office established to strengthen Bumiputeras’ capability and expertise in the economy and education.

He is a founder and currently the chairman of Yayasan Bena Nusa and a board member of the Yayasan Pendidikan Titiwangsa, both of which were established to help to reduce urban poverty and improve educational outcomes for children of the urban poor.

== Political career ==
=== Member of Parliament (2013–2018, 2022–present) ===
==== First term ====
Johari has been active in politics for more than 24 years since 1988. He has held various positions in UMNO and BN of Titiwangsa. In June 2010, he was made the Acting Chief of UMNO's Division of Titiwangsa and appointed as Barisan Nasional Coordinating Chairman for the Titiwangsa parliamentary constituency. Concerned with community issues raised by the Titiwangsa Parliament, he established a Community Service Center in Titiwangsa in July 2010. Amongst the major concerns of the Titiwangsa Parliament community were poverty, squatters’ settlement, infrastructure, vendors and others. The Community Service Center operated on Mondays to Fridays from 9.00 am to 5.00 pm.

In the 2013 general election, Johari was nominated by BN to contest for the Titiwangsa federal seat. He won the seat and was elected as the Titiwangsa MP for the first term after defeating Ahmad Zamri Asa'ad Khuzaimi of Pakatan Rakyat (PR) by 866 votes.

On 27 July 2015, he was appointed as the Deputy Minister of Finance in the BN administration under former Prime Minister and Minister Najib and former Minister II Ahmad Husni Hanadzlah from July 2015. Following a cabinet reshuffle on 27 June 2016, Johari was promoted to the Minister of Finance II. He served as the Minister of Finance II in the Barisan Nasional (BN) administration under former Prime Minister Najib Razak from June 2016 to the collapse of the BN administration in May 2018.

In the 2018 general election, Johari was renominated by BN to defend the Titiwangsa seat. He lost the seat and was not reelected as the Titiwangsa MP after losing to Rina Harun of Pakatan Harapan (PH) by a minority of 4,139 votes.

==== Second term ====
In the 2022 general election, Johari was renominated by BN to contest for the seat. He regained the seat and was reelected as Titiwangsa MP for the second term after defeating Khalid Abdul Samad of PH, Rosni Adam of Perikatan Nasional (PN) and Khairuddin Abu Hassan of the Homeland Fighters Party (PEJUANG) by a majority of 4,632 votes. Johari was elected as Chairman of the Asset Recovery Task Force on the 1Malaysia Development Berhad scandal (1MDB scandal) since March 2023.

=== Minister of Plantation and Commodities (2023–2025) ===
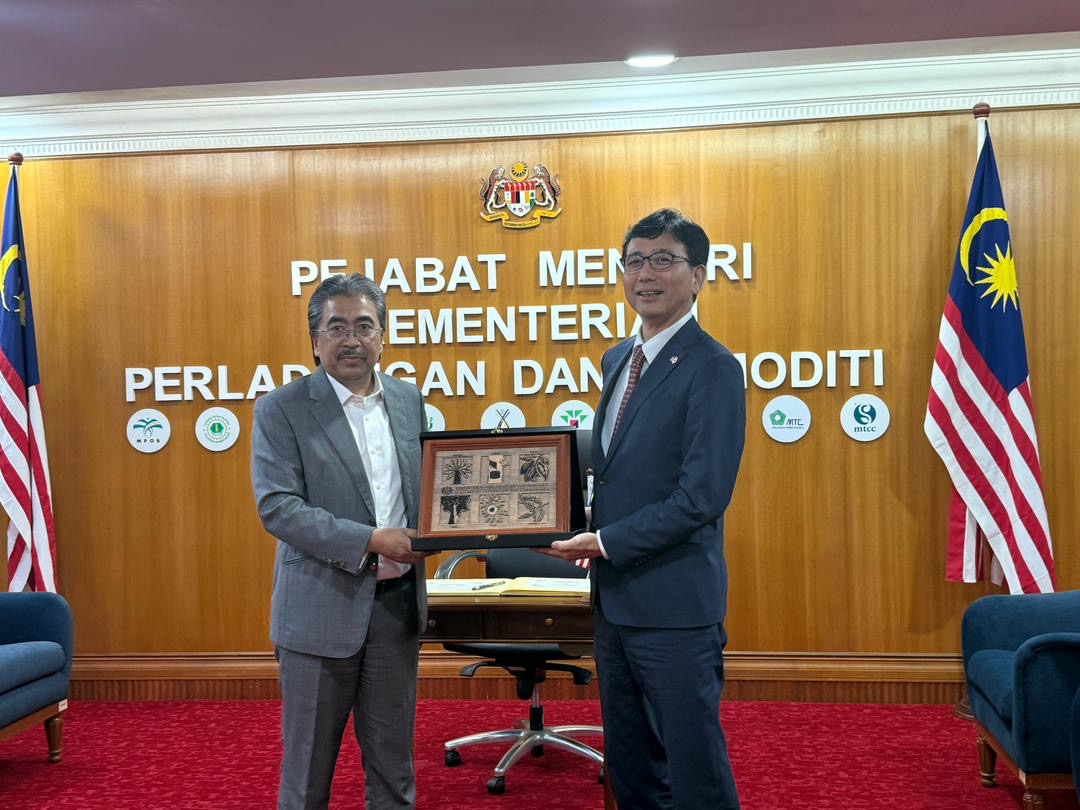
Johari Abdul Ghani and Japanese ambassador Noriyuki Shikata in 2025.

In a cabinet reshuffle on 12 December 2023, Johari was reappointed to the Cabinet as Minister of Plantation and Commodities to replace Fadillah Yusof who was appointed the Minister of Energy Transition and Public Utilities.

=== Minister of Investment, Trade and Industry (2025–present) ===
Johari succeeded Tengku Zafrul as Minister of Investment, Trade and Industry in December 2025, following the expiration of the latter's second term in the Senate and a reshuffle of Anwar's Cabinet. Former Minister of Higher Education Noraini Ahmad succeeded Johari in the Ministry of Plantation and Commodities. Noraini was most recently Deputy Minister of Women, Family and Community Development from 2023 to 2025.

== Election results ==
Parliament of Malaysia
Year	Constituency	Candidate	Votes	Pct	Opponent(s)	Votes	Pct	Ballots cast	Majority	Turnout
2013	P119 Titiwangsa	Johari Abdul Ghani (UMNO)	23,034	50.96%	Ahmad Zamri Asa'ad Khuzaimi (PAS)	22,168	49.04%	45,631	866	82.54%
2018	P119 Titiwangsa	Johari Abdul Ghani (UMNO)	19,701	39.10%	Rina Harun (BERSATU)	23,840	47.31%	50,858	4,139	82.60%
2018	P119 Titiwangsa	Johari Abdul Ghani (UMNO)	19,701	39.10%	Mohamad Noor Mohamad (PAS)	6,845	13.59%	50,858	4,139	82.60%
2022	P119 Titiwangsa	Johari Abdul Ghani (UMNO)	25,042	41.15%	Khalid Abdul Samad (AMANAH)	20,410	33.54%	60,858	4,632	75.37%
2022	P119 Titiwangsa	Johari Abdul Ghani (UMNO)	25,042	41.15%	Rosni Adam (PAS)	15,418	23.86%	60,858	4,632	75.37%
2022	P119 Titiwangsa	Johari Abdul Ghani (UMNO)	25,042	41.15%	Khairuddin Abu Hassan (PEJUANG)	888	1.46%	60,858	4,632	75.37%

== Honours ==
=== Honours of Malaysia ===
- Malaysia
  - Commander of the Order of Meritorious Service (PJN) – Datuk (2005)
  - Recipient of the 17th Yang di-Pertuan Agong Installation Medal (2024)
- Federal Territory (Malaysia)
  - Grand Commander of the Order of the Territorial Crown (SMW) – Datuk Seri (2017)
- Selangor
  - Knight Companion of the Order of Sultan Sharafuddin Idris Shah (DSIS) – Dato' (2003)
  - Recipient of the Sultan Sharafuddin Silver Jubilee Medal (2026)
