= Elyana =

Malaysian singer and actress (born 1987)

- إليانا
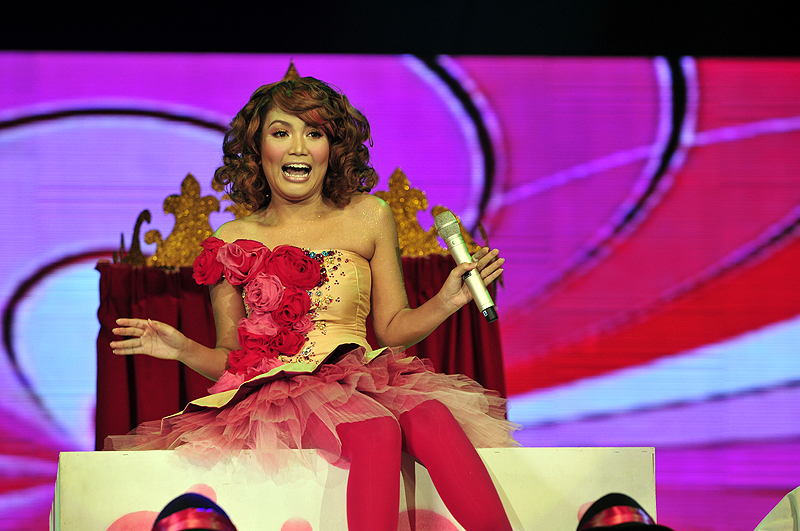
- Born: Erneelya Elyana binti Emrizal; 5 July 1987 (age 39); Shah Alam, Selangor, Malaysia
- Occupations: Singer; actress
- Years active: 2001–present
- Spouse: Khairul Anuar Husin (m. 2010)
- Children: 2 (including 1 stepchild)
- Musical career
- Genres: Pop, Ballad, R&B (2001-2002); Pop rock (2003-2011)
- Instrument: Vocal
- Labels: Fantasia Music City (FMC) (2001–2011); Aquarius Musikindo (Indonesia)
- Website: www.elyanamusic.net

Erneelya Elyana Emrizal (born 5 July 1987) is a Malaysian singer and actress. She started her career in the entertainment world when she was 14 years old. Throughout her musical career, Elyana has published 4 studio albums, 2 compilation albums and has recorded more than 40 songs. At the beginning of her appearance, Elyana performed songs with pop beats, ballads and R&B nuances, then switched to pop rock.

== Personal life ==
Elyana was born and raised in Shah Alam, Selangor and is the second of four children, 3 girls and 1 boy from Emrizal Shamsuddin and Shamsidar Alias.

She married on 19 November 2010 to Khairul Anuar Husin, and was blessed with a daughter, Cinta Sumayyah.

Elyana is undergoing treatment for stage 4 lymphoma cancer. After being eliminated at Gegar Vaganza 4, Elyana announced that she had been suffering from stage four lymphoma cancer for 7 years.

She describes herself as an IT illiterate person.

In October 2018, Elyana adopted a boy with Down syndrome.

On 8 December 2021, Elyana announced that she was free from lymphoma cancer.

== Discography ==
=== Studio albums ===
- Satu (2002)
- Segalanya (2003)
- Bicara Mata Ini (2005)
- Jadi Diriku (2007)

=== Compilation album ===
- Terbaik... Elyana (2012)

== Filmography ==
=== Film ===
Year	Title	Role	Notes
2006	Gong	Ika	First film
2008	Dunia Baru The Movie	Sofia Nordin / Opie	
2010	Hooperz		
2018	Dukun	Nadia Karim	

=== Television series ===
Year	Title	Role	TV Channels	Notes
2003	Sepai Tajul Muluk			Not displayed
2007	Susuk		TV3	Guest actress
2006–2008	Dunia Baru	Sofia Nordin / Opie	TV3	
2008	Sabrina			
2008	Renjis	Kirana	Astro Ria	
2008–2009	Renjis 2	Kirana	Astro Ria	
2009	Kamelia Katrina	Katrina	Astro Ria	
2010	Dunia Baru Reunion	Opie	Gua.com.my	
2012	Masyitah	Masyitah	TV2	
2013	Tanah Kubur (Season 7)	Aisyah	Astro Oasis	Episode: "Wajah Rahsia Hati"
2015	Keluarga Karaoke	Baizura	Astro Bella	
2015–2016	Memori Cinta Suraya	Herself	Astro Prima & Astro Maya HD	Special appearance
2019	Misi Dania Cun	Dania	TV1	
2022	Misi Dania Cun 2	Dania	TV1	
