= Lo' Lo' Mohd Ghazali =

Malaysian politician

Dr. Lo' Lo' Mohd Ghazali
- لُؤْلُؤْ مُحَمَّد غَزَالِي

Member of the Malaysian Parliament for Titiwangsa
- In office 8 March 2008 – 17 July 2011
- Preceded by: Astaman Abdul Aziz (BN–UMNO)
- Succeeded by: Johari Abdul Ghani (BN–UMNO)
- Majority: 1,972

Personal details
- Born: Lo' Lo' binti Mohd Ghazali; 2 August 1957 Kuala Kangsar, Perak
- Died: 17 July 2011 (aged 53) Selayang, Selangor
- Resting place: Kampung Dato Keramat Muslim Cemetery, Kuala Lumpur
- Citizenship: Malaysian
- Party: Pan-Malaysian Islamic Party part of Pakatan Rakyat
- Spouse: Aminuddin Abdul Hamid Karim
- Children: 4
- Parent: Mohd Ghazali Abdullah
- Education: National University of Malaysia
- Occupation: Physician
- Website: docpearl.blogspot.com

Dr. Lo' Lo' binti Mohd Ghazali (2 August 1957 – 17 July 2011; Jawi: لُؤْلُؤْ مُحَمَّد غَزَالِي) was a Malaysian politician. She served as the Member of Parliament for the Titiwangsa constituency in Kuala Lumpur, Malaysia from 2008 until her death in 2011. Lo' Lo' was a career physician who was elected to the central committee of the Pan-Malaysian Islamic Party (PAS) in 2001.

== Education ==
She was born on 2 August 1957 in Kuala Kangsar, Perak. She attended the Connolly National School, Ipoh, Perak, then Sekolah Raja Taayah, Ipoh, Perak and then Kolej Islam Kelang, Selangor. She continued her studies at Universiti Kebangsaan Malaysia majoring in medicine. She was a member of the UKM Student Leadership Council.

She then studied at Adelaide for Alternative Medicine & Surgery - Acupunturist.

She has been involved in KHIM, Malaysian Charity Foundation, Malaysian Islamic Consumers Association, PAPISMA, Allergy & Aesthetic Association, Hypertension Association, AFMY, ABIM, Al Khadeem, JIM, FPUKM Alumni Association, ALKIS Alumni and SISTA Alumni.

== Family ==
Her father was Dato' Hj. Mohd Ghazali Abdullah who was the first Imam of the National Mosque as well as the former Mufti of Perak and her mother Datin Hjh Zainab. Her husband is Professor Dr Aminuddin Abdul Hamid Karim who is a medical lecturer at National Defence University of Malaysia (UPNM).

She has four children: Mawaddah, Muhd Fawwaz, Sakinah and Muhd Farhan, one son-in-law; Mohd Azizy (Mawaddah's husband) and a daughter-in-law; Nur Hafizzah (Fawwaz's wife) as well as a grandson; 'Izz Nu'man (son of Mawaddah).

Mohd Fawwaz's later children with Haffizah Zakaria are Yumna and Musa. (Yumna 2011 - Present ; Musa 2014 - Present)

Sakinah's children with Amir Syafiq are Aisha (2013 - Present)

== Career ==
She served in the General Hospital of Alor Star, Kedah as a medical officer from 1983 to 1985. She served in the Great Health Center of Pokok Sena, Kedah from 1985 until 1987, Kuala Lumpur General Hospital (1987-1988), Kuala Lumpur Islamic Center of Medicine (1988 -1994) and became the medical officer and executive director of KOHILAL Medical Center, Kuala Lumpur from 1994 until the end of her life.

She has also been a PAS Board of Director of Harakah.

== Politics ==
In the 2008 general elections, she defeated the Barisan Nasional - UMNO candidate Datuk Aziz Jamaludin Mhd. Tahir for the Titiwangsa seat with a majority of 1,972 votes. She earned 17,857 votes compared to her opponent with only 15,885 votes. She is among the 3 PAS Muslimat candidates who have won the General Election. Her victory was the first victory for PAS in the Federal Territories after more than 30 years of PAS trying to land in Kuala Lumpur.

She previously contested for the Bukit Gantang seat in the 2004 general elections, losing to the Barisan Nasional candidate, Tan Lian Hoe.

== Death ==
She died on 17 July 2011 of cancer. She was 53 years old. She was buried in Kampung Dato Keramat Muslim Cemetery, Kuala Lumpur.

== Election results ==
Parliament of Malaysia
Year	Constituency	Opposition	Votes	Pct	Government	Votes	Pct	Ballots cast	Majority	Turnout
2004	P059 Bukit Gantang	Lo' Lo' Mohamad Ghazali (PAS)	10,144	38.21%	Tan Lian Hoe (Gerakan)	16,846	61.79%	38,642	8,888	71.72%
2008	P119 Titiwangsa	Lo' Lo' Mohamad Ghazali (PAS)	17,857	52.92%	Aziz Jamaluddin Md Tahir (UMNO)	15,885	47.08%	33,933	1,972	68.01%
