= Mira Filzah =

Malaysian actress, lawyer, model and businesswoman

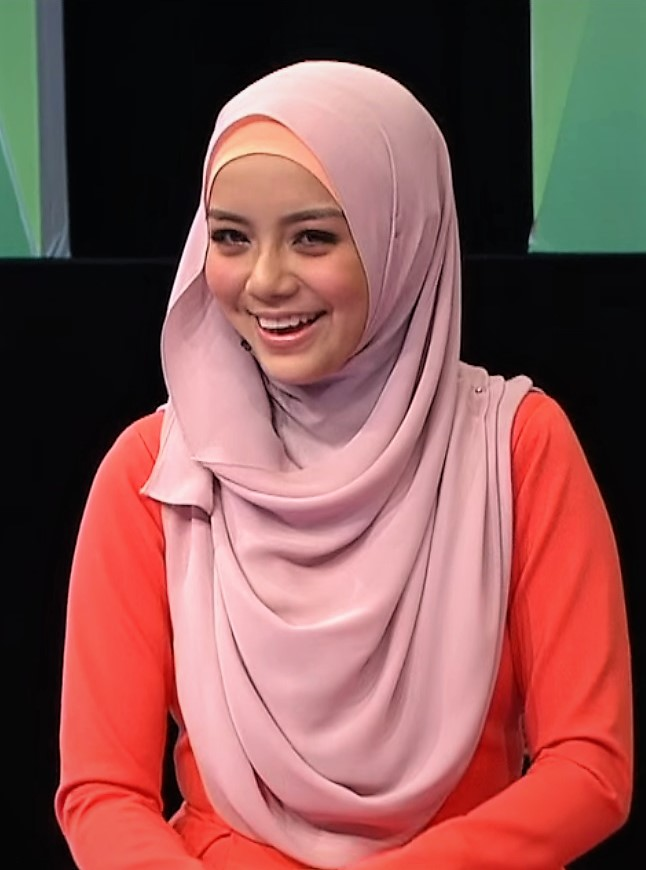
- Mira in 2016
- Born: Nur Amirah Filzah binti Badioezaman; 2 April 1993 (age 33); Ipoh, Perak, Malaysia
- Education: Aminuddin Baki National Secondary School
- Alma mater: Universiti Teknologi MARA
- Occupations: Singer; Actress; Businesswoman
- Years active: 2010–present
- Spouse: Wan Emir Astar Wan Mohammad Khair-il Anuar (m. 2020)
- Children: 1
- Website: mirafilzah.com

Nur Amirah Filzah binti Badioezaman (born 2 April 1993), commonly known by her stage name Mira Filzah, is a Malaysian actress, host, model, and entrepreneur from Malaysia who became one of her country's best-selling female artists. She is referred to be "Malaysia's ultimate girl next door" by the South China Morning Post.

== Career ==
Filzah had her first experience with performance when she was 17 years old. Her first acting role was in the hijabista television drama Dunia Lola. In the drama, she played the lead role of Lola. She took a two-year hiatus from the performing arts to concentrate on her education, but she eventually made a comeback when she was invited to star in the drama Eksperimen Cinta. She portrayed the side character, Suraya, in this production, which attracted a lot of attention and opened a noteworthy chapter in her acting career.

Filzah received the 29th Anugerah Bintang Popular Berita Harian (ABPBH) as a New Popular Female Artist, and the 2016 Era MeleTOP Award as the New Artist of MeleTOP. If granted the chance to direct the tenth season of the Mahligai Cinta show, Filzah keeps honing her legal skills. She took Uyaina Arshad's position on TV3 as Nona's lawyer. She appears in the political drama film Rise: Ini Kalilah, which was directed by Nik Amir Mustapha, with Remy Ishak and Sangeeta Krishnasamy. This movie, which debuted on 13 September 2018, is the play's first motion picture.

In the sports action movie, she then plays Lea, Johan's sister, and a nurse. In Kabir Bhatia's action movie, Zul Ariffin and Remy Ishak costarred with her. Premiering on 29 August 2019, it chronicles the rivalry and eventual reconciliation of two neighbourhood mixed martial artists, along with their battle for honour and familial bonds.

In Rashid Sibir's drama Lelaki Kiriman Tuhan, which was slated to air on TV3 Akasia Slot, Mira reunites with Remy Ishak. The audience's reception to Pujaan Hati Kanda garnered 12 million views during the drama's run and 30 million views on YouTube TV3. In August 2019, she portrayed Putri in Michael Ang's drama Sweet Dreams. Together with Caprice, she had an appearance in the Baby Sayang music video.

Through the drama Adellea Sofea, which featured the title character who teamed up with Ungku Ismail Aziz, who played the role of Fir, Filzah once again made an appearance on television. The In Love With Mira show was presented by her and her spouse, Wan Emir Astar, and it began airing in Naura on 7 September 2020. In a dramatisation of the book Bidadari Kiriman Tuhan, she was partnered with Zul Ariffin once more, this time as Manis Suhaila and Manja Suhana. Her contract as Nona's lawyer ended in August 2021, and Amyra Rosli took over in her stead.

Filzah acted as Miera in the movie Dato' Ai La Beau in 2022. A year later, she costarred with Hun Haqeem in the drama Imam Instant Ustazah Scammer, which aired on Astro Ria, where she portrayed the role of Effa. Having not appeared with the script for over a year, she acknowledged that 2023 will mark her "comeback." As Mira, her true name, she has begun to accept a number of offers; however, there are a few things to consider beforehand.

If she were cast in the newest Hanung Bramantyo film, Cinta Tak Pernah Tepat Waktu, her goal of performing in Indonesia would come true. She expressed her gratitude for being selected to play the lead role in a movie directed by the filmmaker. The idea that she was returning to her hijab business in an effort to gradually leave the entertainment scene has been refuted. The actress, who just started her own hijab line, said that running her own company is a dream come true and that she is still an actor who loves her work.

== Personal life ==
Filzah was born to Badioezaman Abdul Khalik and Faizatul Akmar Hisan on 2 April 1993 in Ipoh, Perak. She is the second of three children. Aina Fadhilah is her younger sister. She attended Aminuddin Baki National Secondary School in Kuala Lumpur for her early education, and MARA University of Technology (UiTM) awarded her a bachelor degree in International Business.

Filzah became engaged to Wan Emir Astar Wan Mohammad Khair-il Anuar on 16 July 2020. Wan Emir Astar is the son of political analyst Mastura Mohd Yazid and Former Member of the House of Representatives of Malaysia, Wan Mohammad Khair-il Anuar. On 3 September 2020, she and Wan Emir married in Bukit Kiara, Kuala Lumpur. She resides in Bangi, Selangor, with her family. The announcement of her pregnancy came in January 2022. On 10 May 2022, she gave birth to a baby boy named Wan Khair Amir.

== Filmography ==
=== Film ===
Year	Title	Character	Notes
2018	Rise: Ini Kalilah	Fizah	Debut film
2019	Sangkar	Lea	
2021	Sa Balik Baju	Aria	
2022	Dato' Ai La Beau	Miera	
2025	Cinta Tak Pernah Tepat Waktu	Dr. Sarah	Indonesian film
TBA	Munajat Kekasih	Nur Sakinah	

=== Drama ===
Year	Title	Character	Broadcast
2013	Dunia Lola	Laila / Lola	Astro Ria
2015	Eksperimen Cinta	Suraya	TV3
2016	Cinta Si Wedding Planner	Izara Batrisya	TV3
2016	Ketupat Palas Mr. Handsome	Ayu	TV3
2016	Tika Langit Terbuka: Down Syndrome	Maria	Astro Oasis
2016	Abang Bomba I Love You	Dr. Dahlia	Astro Ria
2017	Meh Sandar Pada Aku	Afnan Tasneem	TV3
2017	Ops Cinta Din Sardin	Che Ta	TV9
2017	3 Gadis Manis	Aisyah	Astro Gempak
2017	Meh Sandar Lagi	Afnan Tasneem	TV3
2018	Pelangi Cinta	Bunga	TV3
2018	Rahsia Hati Perempuan	Ilaina	Astro Ria
2018	Lelaki Kiriman Tuhan	Naira	Astro Oasis
2018	Pujaan Hati Kanda	Tiara	TV3
2019	Sweet Dreams	Putri	Astro Ria
2019	Sara Sajeeda	Sofea (kameo)	TV3
2019	Adellea Sofea	Adellea Sofea	TV3
2020	Bidadari Kiriman Tuhan	Manis Suhaila / Manja Suhana	Astro Ria
2021	The Maid	Elisa	Astro Ria
2021	The Hotel	Raisa	Astro Ria
2022	Senduk Swap	Roshini	Astro TA-DAA!
2023	Imam Instant Ustazah Scammer	Ustazah Effa	Astro Ria
2023	Super Wira	Seri Gumum	Astro Ceria
2024	Hikayat Bawang Putih Bawang Merah	Bawang Putih	Astro Ceria
2024	Curang Tanpa Niat - The Office Wife	Elina	Astro Ria
2025	Mandul Bukan Pilihan	Billa (Nabilla Intan)	Astro Ria

=== Television ===
Year	Title	Role	Broadcast	Notes
2014	Primadona	Primadona's agent	Astro Prima	
2014–2015	KLTV	Host	Hypp Sensasi	
2015	MV lagu Selamat Malam Cinta Encik Mimpi	Cameo		
2015	Qari Junior	Host	TV3	
2016	Trek Selebriti	Guest artist	Astro Ria	
2016	LePaknil	Guest artist	Astro Ria	
2016	Ketuk-Ketuk Ramadan	Guest artist	TV1	
2016	Ye Ke	Guest artist	TV3	
2016	Bonda Bonding	Guest artist	Astro Ria	
2016	MeleTOP	Guest host	Astro Ria	
2016	Anugerah Bintang Popular Berita Harian ke-29	Host	TV3	
2016	25 Rasul	Storyteller	Astro Oasis	Episode: "Muhammad SAW & Siti Khadijah"
2016–2017	3 Juara	Host	TV3	
2017	CCTV!	Guest artist	Astro Ria	
2017	Shuib, Artis & Telemovie Citra	Guest artist	Astro Ria	
2017	Mahligai Cinta	Host	TV3	
2018–2021	Nona	Host	TV3	
2019	Maharaja Lawak Mega 2018	Guest host	Astro Warna	With the Zero group
2019	Sepahtu Reunion Live	Mawar	Astro Warna	Episode: "Lelaki Kiriman"
2019	Resepi Mak Esah	Host with Sherry Alhadad	Astro Ria	
2019	CCTV!	Guest host	Astro Ria	
2020	I Can See Your Voice Malaysia (Musim 3)	Guest host	TV3	
2020	In Love with Mira, Sebuah Cerita Cinta	Herself	Naura HD	
2021	Romantika	Herself with her husband	Astro Ria	
2022	Ceria Popstar Xtra	Guest judge	Astro Ceria	
2022	Sepahtu Reunion Live	Zila	Astro Warna	Episode: "Tapan Yang Disakiti"

=== Videography ===
Year	Title	Singer
2015	"Selamat Malam Sayang"	Encik Mimpi
2019	"Baby Sayang"	Caprice
2020	"Siapa Tak Mahu"	Dato' Seri Siti Nurhaliza

=== Discography ===
Year	Title	Position				Notes
Year	Title	ERA FM	Hot FM	Muzik Muzik	JOOX	Notes
2017	"Sandar Padaku" (duet with Aliff Aziz)					OST Drama Meh, Sandar Pada Aku!

== Awards and nominations ==
Year	Award	Category	Recipient/Nominee	Result
2016	MeleTOP Era Awards	MeleTOP New Artist	—N/a	Won
2016	29th Berita Harian Popular Star Award	Most Popular New Female Artist	—N/a	Won
2016	Melodi Awards	Melodi Drama Personality	—N/a	Nominated
2016	Melodi Awards	Melodi Sensational Personality	—N/a	Nominated
2017	Kuala Lumpur Drama Festival Awards	Choice Actress	Cinta Si Wedding Planner	Won
2017	30th Berita Harian Popular Star Award	Most Popular Female TV Actress	—N/a	Nominated
2017	30th Berita Harian Popular Star Award	Most Popular TV Host	—N/a	Nominated
2017	EH! Style Awards	Choice Emerging Celebrity	—N/a	Won
2018	31st Berita Harian Popular Star Award	Most Popular Female TV Actress	—N/a	Nominated
2018	31st Berita Harian Popular Star Award	Most Popular TV Host	—N/a	Nominated
2018	31st Berita Harian Popular Star Award	Most Popular Versatile Artist	—N/a	Nominated
2018	Skrin Awards	Best Supporting Actress in a Drama	Dosa Perempuan	Nominated
2019	MeleTOP Era Awards	MeleTOP TV Actress	Lelaki Kiriman Tuhan	Nominated
2019	32nd Berita Harian Popular Star Award	Most Popular Female TV Actress	—N/a	Won
2019	32nd Berita Harian Popular Star Award	Most Popular Female Film Actress	Rise: Ini Kalilah	Won
2019	32nd Berita Harian Popular Star Award	Most Popular TV Host	—N/a	Nominated
2019	32nd Berita Harian Popular Star Award	Most Popular Versatile Artist	—N/a	Nominated
2019	32nd Berita Harian Popular Star Award	Best On-Screen Pairing (with Remy Ishak)	Pujaan Hati Kanda	Won
2019	32nd Berita Harian Popular Star Award	Best On-Screen Pairing (with Remy Ishak)	Rise: Ini Kalilah	Nominated
2019	32nd Berita Harian Popular Star Award	Most Popular Star	—N/a	Won
2019	Telenovela Awards	Most Popular Female Telenovela Actress	Pujaan Hati Kanda / Lelaki Kiriman Tuhan	Won
2019	Telenovela Awards	Versatile Telenovela Queen	—N/a	Won
2021	31st Malaysian Film Festival	Most Promising Female Actress	Sangkar	Nominated
