= Abu Bakar Juah =

Malaysian actor (1948–2020)

- Born: Abu Bakar bin Mohd Juah; 29 April 1948; Taiping, Perak, Federation of Malaya (present day Malaysia)
- Died: 15 August 2020 (aged 72); Cheras, Kuala Lumpur, Malaysia
- Occupation: Actor
- Years active: 1976–2018
- Spouse: Rusidah Mohd. Yassin (m. 1980–2020)
- Children: 4

Abu Bakar bin Mohd Juah (29 April 1948 – 15 August 2020) was a Malaysian actor and former prison officer. He served as senior director of Taiping Prison before retiring in 2005.

== Early life ==
Abu Bakar Juah was born on 29 April 1948 and grew up in Taiping, Perak. He had married Rusidah Mohd Yassin in 1980 and had four children and one grandchild. He was last seen in a Malaysian television drama, Mr. Grey in 2018.

== Filmography ==
=== Film ===
Year	Title	Role	Notes
1984	Matinya Seorang Patriot	Shamsul	
2009	Jangan Tegur	Imam	
2011	Senjakala	Tok Penghulu	
2017	Rempit Sampai Langit	Uncle	Special appearance
2018	Dukun	Judge	

=== Television series ===
Year	Title	Role	TV channel	Notes
2008–2009	Puaka Niyang Rapik	Tok Dalik	TV3	
2009	Keliwon (Season 1)	Pak Ngah	TV3	Episode: "Pontianak"
2009	Keliwon (Season 2)	Ayah	TV3	Episode: "Bidan Jembalang"
2009	Ceplos	Pak Jamal	TV3	
2009	Gerak Khas (Season 11)	Tok Lela	TV2	Episode: "Bomoh Oh Bomoh"
2010	Siong	Arya Mitra	TV3	
2010	Durja Ningsun	Haji Shaaban	TV3	
2010	Chinta	Haji Karim	TV3	
2011	Terowong	Ayah	TV3	Episode: "Bidan"
2011	Tanah Kubur (Season 1)	Tuan Syuib	Astro Oasis	Episode: "Ular Hitam"
2011	Sahara	Mazlan	TV3	
2011–2012	Karma		TV9	Special appearance
2012	Pelangi Kasih	Haji Mahmood	TV3	
2012	Lara Hati	Mat Isa	TV9	
2012	Tanah Kubur (Season 3)		Astro Oasis	Episode: "Rohnya Pulang"
2012	Darjat	Dato' Mansor	TV3	
2014	Tanah Kubur (Season 11)		Astro Oasis	Episode: "Berteman Jin"
2015	Tanah Kubur (Season 13)		Astro Oasis	Episode: "Anakku Sazali"
2016–2017	Isteri Tuan Ihsan	Tan Sri Shamsuddin	Astro Ria	
2018	Mr. Grey	Pak Chad	Astro Ria	

=== Telemovie ===
Year	Title	Role	TV Channel
2008	Tak Serupa Tapi Sama		TV3
2009	Azam	Atok	TV2
2017	Wanita Terindah	Irman Jamaluddin	Astro First Eksklusif

== Illness and death ==
He was diagnosed with liver cancer in 2016. However, he was confirmed to be cured from stage four of colon cancer after undergoing 12 sessions of chemotherapy treatment at the Universiti Kebangsaan Malaysia Medical Centre (PPUKM).

He died at his residence in Cheras, Kuala Lumpur on the evening of 15 August 2020.
