= Perakas Rajaram =

Malaysian filmmaker

- Born: Perakas Rajaram; 6 February 1980 (age 46); Perak, Malaysia
- Occupation: Director
- Years active: 2000–present
- Height: 5 ft 11 in (180 cm)

Perakas Rajaram (also known as R. Perakas) is a Malaysian film director, producer, writer and actor. He is well known for directing highly acclaimed Malaysia Tamil film Vennira Iravuggal. He also played a minor role in Jagat.

== Filmography ==
As Director :

=== Movie ===
Year	Movie	Language	Notes
2014	Vennira Iravuggal	Tamil	Malaysian Kalai Ulagam Awards 2015 - Best Director; International Tamil Film Academy - Best Movie
2014	Un Pol Yarrum Illai	Tamil	
2015	Royal Guill Mask	Burmese	
2018	Tasay Par Lar Pyi	Burmese	
2019	Hero	Burmese	

=== Television ===
Year	Title	Language	TV Channels	Notes
2006	Manasum Manasum	Tamil	TV2	
2006	Deepavali Bonus	Tamil	TV2	Deepavali special telemovie
2006	Manggai	Tamil	TV2	Women's magazine programme
2006	China Chinna Deepavali	Tamil	TV2	Telemovie
2007	Cahaya Permata	Bahasa Malaysia	TV1	Women's magazine programme
2007	Budaya Kita Warisan Kita	Bahasa Malaysia	TV1	13-episode documentary
2007	Isai Malai	Tamil	TV2	Musical programme
2007	Vanakam Malaysia	Tamil	TV2	Documentary
2007	Rentak Bollywood	Bahasa Malaysia; Hindi	TV2	Musical programme
2009	Maunamane Neram	Tamil	TV2	
2009	1 Pagar	Bahasa Malaysia	TV3	Telemovie
2010	Vaarthai Illai	Tamil	TV2	Telemovie
2012	Ennaggal	Tamil	TV2	Telemovie
2012	Ram VCD	Tamil	TV2	Telemovie
2012	Aiyo Innoru Pei Padama	Tamil	TV2	Telemovie
2016	Travelogue Diary	English	TV1	Travelogue / documentary
2020	Yaar Avan	Tamil	Astro Vinmeen HD	

As Actor

- 2015 - Jagat

== Award ==
- Malaysian Kalai Ulagam Awards for Best Director.
