= Tasay Par Lar Pyi =

2018 Burmese film

- Film Poster
- Burmese: တစ္ဆေပါလာပြီ
- Directed by: R. Peraks
- Screenplay by: Zaw Myint
- Story by: Kamal
- Produced by: Ma Aye Aye Win
- Starring: Pyay Ti Oo; Ei Chaw Po; Nyi Htut Khaung; Khin Hlaing; Aung Zaw Min
- Production company: Lucky Seven Film Production
- Release date: October 19, 2018
- Running time: 120 minutes
- Country: Myanmar
- Language: Burmese

Tasay Par Lar Pyi (Burmese: တစ္ဆေပါလာပြီ) is a 2018 Burmese horror film, directed by R. Peraks starring Pyay Ti Oo, Ei Chaw Po, Nyi Htut Khaung and Khin Hlaing. The film, produced by Lucky Seven Film Production premiered Myanmar on October 19, 2018.

== Cast ==
- Pyay Ti Oo as Nyi Lwin
- Ei Chaw Po as Myat Noe
- Nyi Htut Khaung as Mhan Lay
- Khin Hlaing as Maw Si
- Aung Zaw Min
