= Dukun (film) =

2018 film by Dain Said

- Theatrical release poster
- Directed by: Dain Said
- Screenplay by: Al Jafree Md Yusop, Huzir Sulaiman
- Produced by: Dominique Hee
- Starring: Umie Aida; Faizal Hussein; Elyana; Bront Palarae; Adlin Aman Ramlie; Ramli Hassan; Nam Ron; Hasnul Rahmat; Soffi Jikan; Chew Kin Wah
- Cinematography: Yuk Hoy Cheong
- Music by: Luka Kuncevic
- Distributed by: Astro Shaw; Columbia Pictures (Past 2006)
- Release dates: April 5, 2018 (Malaysia); August 8, 2018 (Indonesia)
- Running time: 108 minutes
- Country: Malaysia
- Language: Malay
- Budget: MYR 2.8 million
- Box office: MYR 10 million

Dukun (English: Shaman) is a 2018 Malaysian Malay-language legal horror-thriller film filmed in 2006. The film is loosely based on the true story of the gruesome murder of a Malaysian politician at the time, Datuk Mazlan Idris, by Mona Fandey, a once mildly popular Malaysian singer-turned-witch doctor convicted in 1993. The film was originally slated to be released in 2007 but it was postponed and no official statements was given, due to the adaption of a true high-profile murder case and the controversial nature of the film. Mona Fandey's family herself had voiced their dissatisfaction over the content and basis of the film after announcement of the film release. The producers have since claimed that the film was loosely based on those true events themselves.

The film regained significant attention 12 years later when news got around of its leak footage of the movie resurfaced online drawing stern attention from FINAS, the police and Astro Shaw. After much contemplating on part of Astro Shaw, it was decided and announced that the film will be released nationwide on 5 April 2018, after more than 10 years of finished production.

== Synopsis ==
Karim is a public defender in Kuala Lumpur. He is a single father whose wife ran away many years ago. More recently, his teenage daughter, Nadia, ran away from home. He hires Daud, a former police officer to help track Nadia down but they keep missing her. Daud soon begins to suspect that there is something supernatural blocking them from finding Nadia.

A desperate Karim approaches an old friend who works for the government to alert him if Nadia is found by the authorities. In return, he agrees to defend a Diana Dahlan, a woman shaman who has been arrested for allegedly murdering Datuk Jeffrey, a high-profile businessman during a pagan ritual. During their first meeting, Diana surprises Karim by revealing his past. She knows he and his wife had difficulty conceiving, but the wife eventually gave birth to Nadia. Since then, his wife has gone missing and Nadia has run away from home. Karim starts to believe that Diana does indeed have supernatural abilities.

Meanwhile, Talib and Shah, the officers investigating the Diana Dahlan case find a string of powerful and wealthy men who have gone missing. In an effort to find a connection between these disappearances, Talib meets Daud, who investigated some of the earlier cases. Daud implies that people worship not just facing Mecca, but in all directions nowadays because of fame and wealth, and that he fears the longer Talib investigates this case, the more he would be prone to temptation.

After Daud is murdered by Danni, Diana's assistant, Talib starts to understand that Daud was actually giving him a clue. Diana used to live in the northern, southern, eastern and western regions of the city. After excavating all her former homes, Talib and Shah find dead bodies in each and every one of them. All except one of the bodies are men, who used to be Diana's clients. While studying the female victim's body, Talib and Shah find that it has been mummified with only its womb removed.

Later that night, Nadia is found by the authorities and placed in a women's jail. However, she becomes possessed and turns hysterical. When she is placed in the hospital wing, she is visited by Diana's spirit. It is then revealed in flashbacks that before Nadia's conception, Karim's wife secretly met Diana for her help. In return, Karim's wife was supposed to sacrifice her second fetus. However, when she does become pregnant again years later, Karim's wife does not want to undergo the ritual. However, her womb is forcefully removed by Diana and Danni, and she dies during the ritual.

In court, it is revealed that Diana did not intend to kill Jeffrey. Instead, he was supposed to adhere to certain taboos for a few days in order to become invincible. In order to test his invincibility, Diana tried to chop him with her sword but ended up killing him. She and her assistant then sliced the body into eighteen pieces to dispose it. Karim tries to argue for Diana's sentence to be reduced to manslaughter since she did not intend to kill Jeffrey. However, the court finds her guilty and sentences her to death by hanging. Diana waves her right to appeal and instead chooses to be hanged immediately.

After the verdict, Karim goes to the women's prison to fetch Nadia but is instead told that she had left after being released. He is later informed by Talib that the mummified woman's body found at Diana's old house is none other than his wife's. After Diana is hanged to death, we see her spirit has possessed Nadia, who is now the new woman shaman.

== Cast ==
- Umie Aida as Diana Dahlan, the murderer main character based on Mona Fandey.
- Faizal Hussein as Karim Osman, Diana's lawyer, who also narrates the film.
- Nam Ron as ASP Talib, investigating Officer Talib
- Hasnul Rahmat as Danni
- Adlin Aman Ramlie as Datuk Jefri, Diana's client and eventual victim
- Elyana as Nadia Abdul Karim
- Chew Kin Wah as Dato' Angus Lim
- Soffi Jikan as Fadzli
- Bront Palarae as Insp. Shah
- Ramli Hassan as Daud
- Avaa Vanja as Sara Jamaluddin
- Mislina Mustaffa as Halimah Jusoh
- Jason Chong as Forensics Chan
- Joey Daud as Jamal
- Adman Salleh as Professor Azmi
- C. Kumaresan as Murali
- Goh You Ping as Daniel Ong
- Kasmadiana as Puan Aisha
- Ganesan Sundaram Moorthy as Ravi
- Abu Bakar Juah as Judge
- Ibrahim Akir as Imam
- Norrihan Haji Yakub as Chief Prison Warden
- Zanoora, Dianatasha, Amira Mohd. Razali, Azizah Sulaiman as Prison Warden
- Kazar Saisi as Hanging officers
- Amal Fatih Mustafa as Trainee Hangman
- Nadiya Nisaa as Halimah's eldest child
- Balkisyh Semundur Khan as Woman Batak
- Rahhim Omar as Indonesia General
- Wan Mohammad as Indonesian Soldier
- Paul Colclough as Foreign Reporter
- Shyama Ramasamy as Local Reporter
- Alia Soraya as Girl in Derelict Building
- Betty Rahmad & Martina Newarni as Nadia's Cellmates
- Eijja Salleh as Court Interpreter
- Noor Alycia Norman Sabri as Young Nadia
- Najiha Izzaty as Halimah's Younger Daughter
- Noor Natasha Norman Sabri as Halimah's Eldest Daughter
- Prakash Krishna as Forensics Officer
- Rafiei Hasan & Ahmad Rahiki Selamat as ASP Talib's Policeman
- Kamal Gerak Khas, Hairullanuar Ahmed as Court Policeman
- Chermaine Poo & Hafeeza Edznor Masrum as Junior Prosecutors
- Norhaida Baharin, Shahriza Sabri, Diana Shahrin & Fatin Hajla as Police Woman Escorts
- Azura as Tongkat Batak Courier

== Reception ==
=== Box-office ===
Dukun netted RM1.5 million on its first day of screening throughout Malaysia and Brunei - the highest opening night gross for Astro Shaw-, which accumulated to RM6.2 million after four days of release. It went on to rake in RM10 million over 20 days after its release. The film was also screened in Singapore, Brunei and Indonesia. In Singapore, Dukun was screened at 19 screens, the widest released Malay-language film in Singapore in recent years.
