= 3 Geniuses =

- Theatrical release poster
- Directed by: P. K. Rhaj
- Written by: P. K. Rhaj
- Produced by: Siva Ganison; Vijayandran Palaniappan
- Starring: Gautham; Ghani; Grace
- Cinematography: Makesh K. Dev
- Edited by: R. G. Anand
- Music by: Aathish Uthriyan
- Production companies: On Track Animation; Film Combines
- Distributed by: ZSR Multi Biz
- Release date: 25 September 2014
- Country: Malaysia
- Language: Tamil

3 Geniuses (3G) is a 2014 Malaysian Tamil-language science fiction action film written and directed by P. K. Rhaj. The film's title refers to the characters Gautham, Ghani and Grace.

== Plot ==
Professor Ramanujam discovers three studios kids–Gautham, Ghani and Grace–who are proficient in nano technology and create a chip that can be inserted into a body as a means of identification. An international group attempts steals the chip for anti-social activities.

== Cast ==
- Gautham as Gautham
- Ghani as Ghani
- Grace as Grace
- K. Bhagyaraj as Professor Ramanujam
- Shashi Tharan
- Don Prasna
- Aghonderan Sahadevan
- Sangeeta Krishnasamy
- Jasveer Kaur
- Kavitha
- Mithiran
- Sugumaran
- Kreepasree
- Satya as a school teacher
- Yasin
- Anand Raj
- Girish
- Alibai
- M. N. Krishnakumar
- Perumal as the school principal

== Production ==
The film was reportedly the first scientific themed Malaysian Tamil film. It was also the first Malaysian Tamil film to feature an Indian actor in the lead role. The film featured an international cast with actors from Malaysia, Singapore, India, Pakistan, Nigeria, the Middle East and the United Kingdom. The songs in the film feature the 1Malaysia ideology and additionally show the Malay and Chinese communities. The film was promoted as a Tamil-Malay bilingual, but the film was only made in Tamil and featured Malay subtitles.

== Soundtrack ==
The music was composed by Aathish Uthriyan with lyrics by Ma. Pugazhenthi.

- "Azhago" - Madhu Balakrishnan
- "Mereh Mereh" - Yasin, Priya Prakash
- "Cinnapenneh" - Yasin, Kamalaja
- "Puthumaigal" - Yasin
- "Kangal Imaithi" - Yasin

== Release and reception ==
In 2013, the film was initially planned to be released in 160 screens in India. Phoenix Dasan of Selliyal wrote that the film is one that all Malaysians should bring their geniuses [kids] and go see with their families.
