= Mona Fandey =

Malaysian singer and murderer (1956–2001)

- Mona Fandey in court
- Born: Nur Maznah binti Ismail; 1 January 1956; Kangar, Perlis, Federation of Malaya (now Malaysia)
- Died: 2 November 2001 (aged 45); Kajang Prison, Kajang, Selangor, Malaysia
- Cause of death: Execution by hanging
- Resting place: Kajang Cemetery, Selangor, Malaysia
- Occupations: Pop singer, bomoh
- Spouse: Mohamad Nor Affandi Abdul Rahman (deceased — executed with her)
- Status: Executed on 2 November 2001
- Conviction: Murder
- Penalty: Death

Nur Maznah binti Ismail (1 January 1956 – 2 November 2001), known professionally as Mona Fandey, was a Malaysian pop singer and murderer. She was executed on 2 November 2001 at the age of 45, after being convicted of the murder of Batu Talam state assemblyman Mazlan Idris in 1993.

== Early life and career ==
Maznah started singing and dancing at a very young age. Adopting her stage name Mona Fandey, she released her debut album titled Diana in 1987, with her husband Mohamad Nor Affandi Abdul Rahman endorsing and funding her career, booking several TV appearances, but her career hardly took off.

Following her failure as a singer, she and Affandi turned to practicing witchcraft, and by becoming a bomoh Mona is said to have attracted high-profile clients, including politicians from UMNO. Malaysian shamans and traditional medicine practitioners, who often claimed to act as intermediaries for supernatural spirits and gods, were traditionally popular with the rich and famous, including local politicians seeking an advantage over their rivals at election times. By providing services to wealthy clients, Mona was able to fund a luxury lifestyle of staying in 5 star hotels and owning several expensive cars (from brands such as Jaguar, Mercedes-Benz and BMW) as well as purchasing several mansions throughout Malaysia.

Mona left behind a daughter from her first marriage named Mazdiana Affandi, with two step-sons from her marriage with Affandi.

== Murder of Dato Mazlan Idris ==
In 1993, the couple were approached by Mazlan Idris, a politician who was eyeing the position of the Menteri Besar of Pahang. The couple agreed by promising to give Mazlan a talisman comprising a tongkat and a songkok supposedly owned by Sukarno, the first President of Indonesia, with an offer of RM2.5 million. In exchange, Mazlan agreed to pay RM500,000 and giving them 10 land titles as guarantee for the remainder.

Mazlan was reported missing on 2 July 1993 after withdrawing almost RM300,000 from various banks in Kuala Lumpur and thereafter meeting Mona at Raub, Pahang. Soon afterwards, Mona was reported to have gone on a shopping spree in Kuala Lumpur where she bought a new Mercedes-Benz and also bought a new cell phone, gold jewelry, sofas, kitchen cabinets, a TV and a video recorder. All items were paid for in cash. On 15 July 1993, Mona checked into Tung Shin Hospital for plastic surgery on her face, forehead and nose.

After arresting the couple's assistant Juraimi Hassan on 13 July 1993 for an unrelated drug consumption offence and questioning him at Dong police station, on 22 July 1993 Mazlan's dismembered and partially skinned body was discovered by the Royal Malaysia Police, buried six feet deep in a pit covered with cement on a property owned by Mazlan in Pahang. His body was dismembered into 18 parts and buried in a hole at the storeroom of an unfinished house. Police also found an altar and statues of deities, as well as knives and an axe at the scene.

On 2 August 1993, Mona Fandey, her husband Mohamad Nor Affandi Abdul Rahman and the couple's assistant Juraimi Hassan were charged with the murder of Mazlan Idris and remanded in custody.

== Allegations of involvement in other murders ==
In the aftermath of Mazlan's murder, Mona was also suspected by police to have been linked to other unrelated serious crimes, such as involvement in the disappearance of five housemaids who had worked for her at various times during the late 1980s.

Additionally, the remains of a family of three (Tan Kim Ann, his wife and their five-month-old son), whose dismembered and mutilated bodies were discovered buried at two different sites in Kemaman District in early August 1993, were identified as former followers of Mona who had also mysteriously disappeared a couple of years earlier. News reporters at the crime scene near Kijal spotted Mona's husband Nor Affandi being taken away in a police car, and it was later revealed that he owned the plots of land where the bodies were discovered. Authorities believed the victims were offered as human sacrifices as part of a witchcraft ritual, however Tan's sister made a statement that his wife arrived at her house in an agitated state without her baby one day asking to borrow a large amount of money, which coupled with the fact that the remains of the parents and baby were discovered at two separate locations raised the possibility the infant was kidnapped for ransom, and the entire family was murdered after the money was handed over to prevent the crime being reported.

Police also linked the murder of Irma Zhilan who had disappeared from Klang in early 1992 to which her dismembered body was found scattered across three locations in Pandamaran soon after to Mona. In August 1993, police dug up 4 glass containers containing human internal organs from the back garden of the house where Mazlan's remains were found, which were believed to belong to Zhilan. Several statues of deities, such as the 10-armed Hindu goddess Durga, were also recovered from the same plastic bag that held the glass containers.

== Preliminary judicial inquiry ==
On 26 October 1993, pre-trial hearings in relation to the murder of Mazlan Idris began. In opening statements, the head of C.I.D.'s Kidnap and Ransom unit Takbir Ahmad Nazir Ahmad described how suspect Mohamad Nor Affandi Abdul Rahman offered to lead detectives to the remains of Mazlan while being interviewed by the police on 22 July 1993. Affandi then led the officers to a house in Lata Jarum in Pahang, where after ordering the padlocked door of a storeroom to be opened he then indicated an area of the cement floor for the team to start digging. An hour later body parts were discovered at a depth of about five feet, and subsequent investigation of dental records proved the remains to be those of Mazlan Idris.

Chief Inspector Mahpop Jaafar also gave evidence that suspect Juraimi Hassan had informed the police that a body was buried in the same house in Raub, and that he had drawn a sketch map of the house with locations marked on it for where the body was and where Mazlan was actually murdered.

Forensic pathologist Doctor Abdul Rahman Yusof testified to having performed an autopsy on Mazlan's body, and asserted that the neck was severed with a sharp weapon that caused the victim to die instantly from a combination of catastrophic blood loss and the immediate stopping of vital organs (such as the heart and lungs). Doctor Rahman agreed with the Deputy Public Prosecutor Suriyadi Halim Omar that the time of death was at some point between 2 July and 8 July of that year.

== Murder trial ==
On 12 September 1994, the trio's trial for the capital murder of Mazlan Idris began at the Temerloh, Pahang High Court in front of a seven-person jury (trial by jury was only abolished in Malaysia from 1 January 1995). Mona Fandey, Mohamad Nor Affandi Abdul Rahman and Juraimi Hassan all pled not guilty to the charge.

=== Prosecution evidence ===
Giving evidence for the prosecution, employees from Bank Bumiputera Malaysia and the Oriental Bank in Kuala Lumpur confirmed that Mazlan had cashed personal cheques worth a total of RM289,000 from three different bank branches on the last day he was seen alive, and a Umno member who had attended a meeting at Mazlan's office in Raub that evening testified that Nor Affandi was sitting in the passenger seat of Mazlan's car as it drove away afterwards.

Plastic surgeon Doctor Wong Kang Shen confirmed that he had performed RM13,000 worth of cosmetic procedures on Mona during a 5-hour operation on 15 July 1993, other witnesses confirmed Mona and Nor Affandi had purchased furniture worth RM11,900 and electrical goods worth RM4,769 on 8 and 9 July 1993 to be delivered to a house in Subang Jaya, while salesmen from the La Puteri Goldsmith and the Far East Goldsmith shops in the Ampang Park shopping center gave evidence of selling jewelry worth over RM27,000 to Mona on 3 July 1993, all of which was paid for in cash. A lawyer also testified that he met Nor Affandi at the Park Royal Hotel in Kuala Lumpur on 5 July 1993, where he was asked to notarize documents (apparently signed by Mazlan Idris himself) giving Nor Affandi power of attorney over 5 pieces of land he claimed to have bought from Mazlan.

Doctor Abdul Rahman Yusof, who had conducted the official autopsy, gave evidence that Mazlan's head was cut off by three strikes to his neckbone, possibly by an axe. There were no defensive wounds on the body, which the expert witness believed was in a lying position on the ground when the fatal blows were struck. As well as the body having been chopped into 18 different parts, almost all the toenails had been pulled out and the victim's testicles were missing.

=== Challenge on admissibility of statements ===
On 23 October 1994, while giving evidence in his own defence, Juraimi Hassan challenged the admissibility of statements he gave to the police while under arrest, claiming to have been beaten and threatened into making a confession. Hassan also accused the police of inducing him into admitting guilt by promising a reduced sentence by turning state's evidence against his co-accused. However, the court ruled that Hassan would have registered a complaint as soon as possible if he had been beaten, rather that waiting until he was on trial many months later, therefore there was no evidence of mistreatment and his statement could thus be submitted as evidence.

Similarly, while giving evidence in her own defence on 16 November 1994, Mona Fandey claimed to have been mistreated during her interrogation by officers at the Bukit Aman police headquarters in July 1993, alleging that officers pressed down on her stitches from recent plastic surgery to inflict pain on her. While Mona claimed she was given 3 blank sheets of paper per day to sign while in custody, detective Takbir Ahmad Nazir Mohanmad asserted that she had willingly signed all 33 pages of her cautioned statement after she had finished recording it. After deliberation, the court ruled that she had also given all statements voluntarily and allowed them to be admitted as evidence. However, Judge Datuk Mokhtar ordered that sections of the statement regarding two separate murders committed in Selangor and Terengganu involving the three defendants be redacted, as they were irrelevant to the charges Mona was on trial for and therefore should not be revealed to the jury.

=== Defence submissions ===
On 23 November 1994, Justice Datuk Mokhtar Sidin declared that the prosecution has established prima facie evidence against the three accused and called them to make their defence against the charge of murdering Mazlan Idris.

Taking the stand, Juraimi Hassan admitted to beheading Mazlan with an axe at around 10pm on 2 July 1993 in the house where the victim's body was discovered. Hassan asserted that he was acting under orders from Nor Affandi, who then instructed him to dismember the body and bury the remains. According to Hassan, Mazlan arrived at the house on the night in question with Mona and Nor Affandi to attend an occult ritual. Changing into a sarong, Mazlan then lay down in a candlelit bathroom, where Mona placed an orchid on his forehead and told him to close his eyes and wait for a "mysterious voice" to ask him how much money he wanted to appear. When Mazlan fell asleep, Nor Affandi ordered Hassan to kill him, then Mona and Nor Affandi took a shower in another bathroom to wash off the blood.

Giving evidence in his own defence, Nor Affandi denied planning the murder of Mazlan in advance or ordering Hassan to kill him, and claimed that while he and Mona were giving Mazlan a flower bath to cleanse him of bad luck Hassan barged in unexpectedly and chopped off his head with an axe. He and Mona then fled the scene in terror, according to Nor Affandi, and were in such a state of shock that they did not think to inform the police about what they witnessed. Under cross-examination, Nor Affandi admitted that while he claimed to be too traumatized to stop at any of the 10 police stations he thereafter passed on the way to the Plaza Hotel in Kuala Lumpur, he had recovered sufficiently to forge the signature of Mazlan on documents and attempt to fraudulently transfer ownership of the victim's land when he held a meeting with a lawyer the next morning.

Mona refused the chance to give testimony or be cross examined, however she did read a prepared statement from the dock where she denied all involvement in Mazlan's murder. Deputy Public Prosecutor Zakaira Sam rebutted her pleas of innocence by pointing out that she did not report the crime to the authorities, and instead went on a wild shopping binge the day afterwards.

=== Closing statements ===
In an hour long summary, Deputy Public Prosecutor Zakaria Sam asserted that Mona and Nor Affandi had murdered Mazlan for his money, pointing out how they went on a shopping spree that included buying a Mercedes Benz for RM125,000 in cash the day after he disappeared. Withdrawals made by Mazlan were paid out in RM1,000 notes, and evidence showed that Mona and Nor Affandi had paid for their purchases in RM1,000 notes also. Prosecutor Zakaria said the murder of Mazlan was pre-meditated, with the victim being lured to a secluded location for what he believed to be a black magic ritual designed to enhance his political career during upcoming elections, however when he dropped his guard and was at his most vulnerable he was ruthlessly killed instead.

Defence lawyers for Hassan asked the court to take his young age and lack of education into consideration as mitigating circumstances, while lawyers for Mona and Nor Affandi declined to make any submissions after the couple informed the judge they would accept the court's decision.

In summing up the case for the jury, the trial judge said that although there was no direct evidence against the accused, there was circumstantial evidence that all three were involved in the murder.

=== Demeanour of Mona Fandey while on trial ===
Throughout the trial, Mona exhibited eccentric behaviour including appearing cheerful, constantly smiling and posing for press photographers. She dressed extravagantly everyday with bright and colourful designs on her dress, at one point exclaiming "Looks like I have many fans!". Observers later remarked that Mona had finally received the spotlight she had craved her entire life, with her demeanour more comparable to a celebrity arriving at a movie premiere than a criminal defendant being escorted into court by prison officers.

== Verdict ==
On 9 February 1995, Mona Fandey, her husband Mohamad Nor Affandi Abdul Rahman and the couple's assistant Juraimi Hassan were found guilty as charged and sentenced to death by hanging for the murder of Mazlan Idris. Speaking to reporters after the sentence was handed down, Mona stated "I am happy with the decision and I thank Malaysians", before blowing kisses to a crowd of bystanders. All three convicts were then transported to the death row section of Kajang Prison in Selangor to await their execution.

== Appeals ==
Mona and the others filed appeals to the Federal Court and in 1999, the court dismissed their appeals and upheld the death sentence. Finally, the three convicts sought to obtain a pardon from the Pardons Board of Malaysia, their final chance of redemption. However, the board refused to give clemency.

According to prison officers, Mona was a well behaved inmate who read the Quran and performed Islamic prayers five times a day. Mona and her co-accused were given a last meal of Kentucky Fried Chicken on the night before their execution.

== Execution ==
In the early morning hours of 2 November 2001, Mona, Affandi and Juraimi were hanged at Kajang Prison. A prison official said the trio expressed no remorse at the pre-dawn execution. It was reported that during her execution Mona uttered the words "aku takkan mati", meaning "I will never die", and was still calm and smiling.

== Legacy ==
Mona Fandey gained more notoriety than she had when she was still a pop singer. There was wide local and even international media coverage and plenty of public interest. Anti-death penalty movements including Amnesty International voiced their opposition to the execution of the trio. In 2002, Malaysian film director Amir Muhammad made a short film entitled Mona in his shorts series.

In 2006, a film by Dain Iskandar Said entitled Dukun was widely assumed to be based on Mona Fandey. The public screening of this highly anticipated film was constantly pushed back, most likely due to concerns relating to the contents of the film, the relationship with Mona Fandey, and the implications for her family. However, the movie was leaked online through Facebook on early February 2018. The movie was released in cinemas on 5 April 2018.

The crime was covered in a chapter called Pop Singer Witch Doctor in the best-selling Malaysian Murders & Mysteries book written by journalists Martin Vengadesan and Andrew Sagayam.

The Mona Fandey affair was one of the last jury trials to be conducted in Malaysia. The sensational nature of the case contributed toward the government's decision to discontinue the jury system. All trials by jury were abolished on 1 January 1995.

== See also ==
- Capital punishment in Malaysia
