= Rise: Ini Kalilah =

- Directed by: Saw Teong Hin; Nik Amir Mustapha; M. S. Prem Nath
- Story by: Fred Chong
- Produced by: Fred Chong
- Starring: Remy Ishak; Mira Filzah; Sangeeta Krishnasamy; Jack Tan; Shashi Tharan; Jenn Chia
- Edited by: Johan Arif Mazlan; Anand R
- Production company: WebTV Asia
- Release date: 13 September 2018 (Toronto International Film Festival)
- Running time: 100 minutes
- Country: Malaysia
- Languages: English; Malay; Mandarin; Tamil
- Budget: MYR 2 million
- Box office: MYR 58,411

Rise: Ini Kalilah (transl. Rise: This is the Time) is a 2018 Malaysian Malay-language political drama film co-directed by Saw Teong Hin, Nik Amir Mustapha and MS Prem Nath, produced by WebTV Asia. The film was starring Remy Ishak, Mira Filzah, Sangeeta Krishnasamy, Jack Tan, Shashi Tharan and Jenn Chia as well as other ensemble cast. Based on an actual events during the 14th General Election on May 9, 2018, the film was released on 13 September 2018.

== Synopsis ==
The storyline tracks six intertwined personal stories and struggles leading up to the 2018 Malaysian general election.

== Plot ==
June is a fixer working with Australian journalist Marcus to cover the 2018 Malaysian general election. The two investigate instances of opposition Pakatan Harapan posters being vandalised and vote tampering. Elsewhere, Fizah is a Malay university student studying in the United Kingdom while working part-time as a restaurant waiter. After ending up in an election campaign video, Fizah is convinced by a classmate to return to Malaysia. Meanwhile, Corporal Azman is a police officer who grows disillusioned with the corruption of the ruling Barisan Nasional coalition. While his colleague takes bribes from politicians and businessmen, Azman struggles to balance his moral compass with feeding his family.

Shanti juggles teaching at a Tamil primary school while working as a polling and counting agent. She clashes with her father, a principal who is skeptical of change. Shanti also has a romantic relationship with Leong. Meanwhile in Singapore, Leong is a hot-tempered hawker stall worker who returns to Malaysia in order to vote in the 2018 election. Elsewhere, Selva is a foreign worker agency owner who witnesses the plight and exploitation of Bangladeshi migrant workers.

The six storylines converge on the election day on 9 May. Shanti discovers that election officials are a turning a blind eye to non-citizens posing as voters. Fizah arrives at the polling booth at 5pm but is prevented from casting her vote on the grounds that the deadline for voting has closed. Under pressure from Shanti and June, the election officials allow Fizah and the other voters to cast their vote. The film reaches a climax when someone attempts to flee with stolen ballot boxes in a car. The protagonists are involved in a scuffle with the driver. Azman's colleague attempts to beat the participants but Azman restrains him, choosing the side of the people.

The film ends with stock footage from the 2018 Malaysian election and Mahathir Mohamad addressing the nation. June and Marcus also cover Mahathir's meeting with the Yang di-Pertuan Agong Nazri Shah at Istana Negara.

== Cast ==
- Remy Ishak as Corporal Azman
- Mira Filzah as Fizah
- Jack Tan as Leong
- Sangeeta Krishnasamy as Shanti
- Shashi Tharan as Selva
- Jenn Chia as June
- Mark O'Dea as Marcus
- David Anthony as Raj
- Tom Ashley as Sammy
- Mustaqim Bahadon as Johan
- Tony Eusoff as PACA Coach
- Choo Hao Ren as Seng
- Azman Hassan as Yusof
- Jalaluddin Hassan as Man in flying car
- Frederick Lee as Steve
- Remon Lim as Leong's mother
- Pushpa Narayan as Latha
- Syirin Said as Friend
- Sharifah Sakinah as Siti
- Qistina Raisah as Aishah
- Shahfi Rafiq as Adam
- Yana Samsudin as Fizah's sister
- Sweet Qismina as Sasha
- Thangamani Velayudan as Maniam
- Steve Yap as Mr. Chong
- Moon Yoong as Cindy

== Production ==
Rise: Ini Kalilah was shot in Malaysia, Singapore and Britain.

== Release and reception ==
Rise: Ini Kalilah received overwhelmingly negative reviews and was a box office bomb. Dennis Chua of The New Straits Times wrote, "The abundance of main characters makes it confusing, and while there is nothing wrong having three directors, there should be better coordination, so that the mesh up of the six stories becomes more consistent. The film’s saving grace is the theme song, a cover version of the iconic 1990s patriotic tune Sejahtera Malaysia". It grossed only RM58,411 after 14 days in the theaters despite a production budget of RM2 million, an ensemble cast and the best effort of the new government to promote it.

On 25 February 2019, international streaming service Netflix acquired the rights to Rise: Ini Kalilah in Malaysia.

== See also ==
- 2018 Malaysian general election
