= Sangeeta Krishnasamy =

Malaysian actress and model

- சங்கீதா கிருட்டிணசாமி
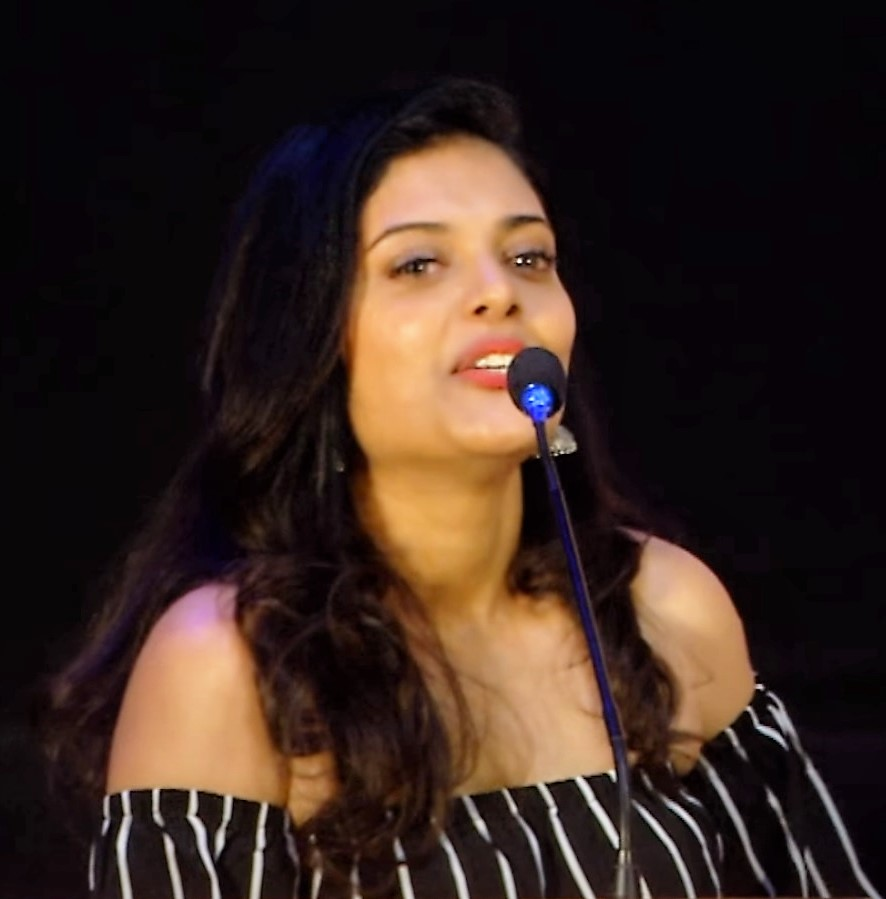
- Sangeetha at audio launch of Vedigundu Pasangge in 2018
- Born: Kuala Lumpur, Malaysia
- Education: University of London
- Occupations: Actress; Model; Producer
- Years active: 2010–present
- Height: 1.65 m (5 ft 5 in)

Sangeeta Krishnasamy is a Malaysian actress and model. She is known for her roles in the Pasangge trilogy (2014-2018), Vennira Iravuggal (2014), and Adiwiraku (2017).

== Career ==
She did a small role in the Indian Tamil movie after making an appearance in Venkat Prabhu's Goa and as the female lead in the unreleased film ZHA co-starring Babloo Prithviraj and Raaghav. In 2015 she was the female lead for two hit Malaysian Tamil movies Vetti Pasanga and Vennira Iravuggal.

She also won the Malaysian Kalai Ulagam Award 2015 for Best Actress in the Movie and Telemovie category for Vennira Iravuggal and Unarvu, respectively. The film Adiwiraku earned her the Best Actress of 2017 award, and marked her first venture into mainstream Malaysian cinema, and despite being a newcomer and her first film in the Malay language, and subsequently also won the Anugerah Skrin Award for Best Film Actress and the Kuala Lumpur Film Critics Award for Best Actress, making her the first actress to win all three in the same year.

== Filmography ==
=== Film ===
Year	Title	Role	Language	Notes
2010	Goa	Priya	Tamil	Indian Tamil film; Uncredited role
2010	I Know What You Did Last Deepavali		Tamil	
2014	Vetti Pasanga		Tamil	Pasange Trilogy
2014	Vennira Iravuggal	Megala	Tamil	Malaysian Kalai Ulagam Award 2015 for Best Actress Award in Movie category
2014	3 Geniuses		Tamil	
2015	Maravan		Tamil	
2017	Adiwiraku	Miss Cheryl Ann Fernando	English; Malay	29th Malaysia Film Festival 2017 for Best Actress Award; Anugerah Skrin 2017 for Best Film Actress Award; Kuala Lumpur Film Critics Awards 2017 for Best Actress Award
2017	Kambathe Kannemma		Tamil	
2017	Ennaval	Barathi and Cinderella	Tamil	
2017	Vassantha Villas		Tamil	
2018	Villavan: The Vigilante		Tamil	
2018	Vedigundu Pasangge	Vidhya	Tamil	Highest grossing Malaysian Tamil film of all time The Final Sequel Of Pasangge Trilogy
2018	Rise: Ini Kalilah	Shanti	Malay	
2020	Daulat	Melissa	Malay	
2020	Jebat	Jasmine	Malay	
2021	Hantu Bonceng 2.0	Sally	Malay	
2021	Proksi	Elle	Malay	
2022	Air Force The Movie: Selagi Bernyawa	Lieutenant Layla Saravana	Malay	
2022	Juang	Santhia	Malay	
2023	Duan Nago Bogho	Salmi	Malay	
2023	The Gemencheh Boys	—N/a	Malay; English	As producer
2024	Baik Punya Ah Long		Malay	

=== Television ===
Year	Title	Language	Notes
2009	Manippu	Tamil	
2009	Satyam Sivam Sundram	Tamil	
2009	Deepa Kondattam	Tamil	Deepavali Special
2010	Bangsar Villa's	Tamil	
2010	Narmadha	Tamil	
2010	A Night Before Christmas	Tamil and English	Christmas Special
2011	Natpu Natpu	Tamil	
2011	Netru Illatha Matram	Tamil	
2011	Natpugal Pirivathillai	Tamil	
2012	Last Chance	Tamil	
2014	Unarvu	Tamil	Malaysian Kalai Ulagam Award 2015 for Best Actress Award in Telemovie and DVD category
2015	Mounam	Tamil	
2017	Oh My English Level Up!	Malay and English	
2018	Jibril	Malay	
2019	Detak Cinta Stetoskop	Malay	
2019	Spanar Jaya X	Malay	
2019	Adavadi Deepavali	Tamil	Deepavali Special
2020	Berdua	Malay	
2021	Muruku Ikan Masin	Tamil, Malay	
2021	Kari Ayam Mama	Malay	
2022	Kudeta	Malay	

=== Hosting and Emcee ===
Title	Language	Channel	Notes
Attam 100 Vagai	Tamil	Astro Vaanavil	
Sukaneka 1 Malaysia	Malay	TV2	
Yellaithandi Varuvera	Tamil	Astro Vaanavil	Pongal special show
Kaadhal Oviyam	Tamil	Astro Vaanavil	
AIM Malaysian-Indian Award	English	Astro Vaanavil	Award Show

=== TVC ===
- L’Oreal Hair Asia Pacific Malaysia
- NTV7 Stars of Diwali
- Nikon ambassador web
- Tourism Malaysia 2010-2012
- Swami Sivananda Hair Oil
- Hari Pahlawan Kerinduan
- SPS Jewelries Nilai Ambassador

== Awards and nominations ==
Year	Awards	Category	Nominated works	Result
2015	Malaysian Kalai Ulagam Award 2015	Best Actress Award in Movie category	Vennira Iravuggal	Won
2015	Malaysian Kalai Ulagam Award 2015	Best Actress Award in Telemovie and DVD category	Unarvu	Won
2017	29th Malaysia Film Festival	Best Actress	Adiwiraku	Won
2017	Kuala Lumpur Film Critics' Awards 2017	Best Actress	Adiwiraku	Won
2017	Anugerah Skrin 2017	Best Film Actress Award	Adiwiraku	Won
2018	Kuala Lumpur Film Critics' Awards 2018	Best Actress	Vedigundu Pasangge	Nominated
2019	Norway Tamil Film Festival Awards 2019	Best Actor Female Tamil – Diaspora	Vedigundu Pasangge	Won
2019	30th Malaysia Film Festival	Best Actress	Rise: Ini Kalilah	Nominated
2021	31st Malaysia Film Festival	Best Actress	Ennaval	Nominated
2022	32nd Malaysia Film Festival	Best Actress	Juang	Nominated

== See also ==
- Malaysian Tamil Cinema
- Vennira Iravuggal
