= Adiwiraku =

- Directed by: Eric Ong
- Screenplay by: Jason Chong; Eric Ong
- Story by: Cheryl Fernando
- Produced by: Eric Ong
- Starring: Sangeeta Krishnasamy
- Production companies: SOL Pictures; Filmmecca Studio
- Distributed by: Empire Film Solution
- Release date: March 9, 2017
- Running time: 122 minutes
- Country: Malaysia
- Languages: Malay, English

Adiwiraku (English: My Superhero) is a 2017 Malaysian Malay-language drama film directed by Eric Ong, who also co-wrote the film alongside Cheryl Fernando, Jason Chong and Yentanamera. The film stars Sangeeta Krishnasamy amongst several newcomers. The film chronicles the experiences of Cheryl Ann Fermando, a rural schoolteacher.

== Cast ==
- Sangeeta Krishnasamy as Miss Cheryl Ann Fernando
- Xavier Fong as Sir Constant
- Ahmad Adnin Zidane as Zidane
- Nur Idina Tasnim as Irdina
- Rizal Fahmi as Rizal
- Balqis Sani as Balqis
- Wan Azlyn Maasyah Farra Safwan as Alia
- Khairi Mohd Kamal as Khairi
- Ajwad Mohd Sobri as Ajwad
- Faez Reezme as Faez
- Alif Abubakar as Alif

== Reception ==
A critic from The Star wrote, "Adiwiraku (My Superhero) can also check all the right boxes for having an inspiring story based on real events. What makes Adiwiraku even more special is that the majority of the young actors featured in this film are playing themselves. And, surprisingly, most of them are quite natural in front of the camera, especially Irdina Tasmin, Ahmad Adnin Zidane and Balqis Sani".

== Accolades ==
At the 29th Malaysia Film Festival, Adiwiraku won the Best Film Award, Sangeeta Krishnasamy won the Best Actress award and Jason Chong won the Best Original Story award. Krishnasamy also won the Anugerah Skrin Award for Best Film Actress and The Kuala Lumpur Film Critics Award for Best Actress.
