= Khunsa (TV series) =

2024 Malaysian television series

- Promotional poster
- Genre: Melodrama; Love; Family; Conflict; Revenge; Mystery; Horror; Thriller; Psychology
- Directed by: Shahrulezad Mohameddin
- Starring: Azhan Rani; Mikael Noah; Mhia Firdaus; Amalina Arham; Nadia Aqilah; Farah Ahmad
- Country of origin: Malaysia
- Original language: Malay
- No. of episodes: 28

Production
- Executive producer: Hisham A. Karim
- Producers: Fazli Hj. Baharom; Shahrulezad Mohameddin
- Running time: 42 minutes
- Production company: Radius One

Original release
- Network: Astro Ria
- Release: March 11 – April 25, 2024

Khunsa (lit. 'KHUN:SA Che Khun Che Nisa') is a 2024 Malaysian television series, directed by Shahrulezad Mohameddin, starring Azhan Rani, Sherry Alhadad, Rafique Iskandar and Kael Noah. This series premiered on Astro Ria on March 11, 2024.

== Synopsis ==
Che Khun's birth as a Intersex had an impact on his or her father's emotions. He forced & raised Che Khun as a man and made Che Khun's life miserable.

== Cast ==
=== Main ===
==== Wan Jusoh's family ====
- Azhan Rani as Wan Jusoh
- Mikael Noah as Che Khun (7 years old)
- Mhia Firdaus as Che Khun (14 years old)
- Amalina Arham as Che Nisa (21 years old)
- Nadia Aqilah as Munah / Che Nisa (35 years old)
- Farah Ahmad as Che Nisa (50 years old)
- Putri Qaseh Izwandy as Che Timah (10 years old)
- Putri Jannah Izwandy as Che Timah (17 years old)
- Salsa Cella as Che Midah (8 years old)
- Farah Nadiah as Che Midah (15 years old)
- Zizi Hazirah as Che Midah (23 years old)
- Emelda Rosemila as Che Midah (30 years old)
- Haura Jamalullail as Che Ani (7 years old)
- Kiky Hannah as Che Ani (14 years old)
- Dina Allysha as Che Ani (20 years old)
- Rasya Dean as Che Ani (28 years old)

==== Long Hassan & Long Hawa's family ====
- Jeri Jamalullail as Long Hassan
- Laila Nasir as Long Hawa
- Rafique Iskandar as Bakri (7 years old)
- Muhsin Nadzli as Bakri (14, 21 & 35 years old)
- Fauzi Nawawi as Bakri (50 years old)

=== Introducing ===
- Ezu Hashim as Tuyah
- Zarif Ghazzi as Naem
- Danny Soda as Juki (Marzuki)

=== Supporting ===
- Sherry Alhadad as Zaiton
- Megat Sharizal as Ezad
- Zarina Zainoordin as Sarimah
- Fizzy Aziz as Khairul
- Noorkhiriah as Noor Marlia
- Elfriena as Zaida
- Hisham A. Karim as En. Hisham
- Alyssa Lee as Mei Lin
- Zam Azmi as Shah
- Azrul Anuar as Azrul
- Azrul Zaidi as Ustad Malek
- Josiah Hogan as Azlan (30 years old)
- Shiqin Kamal as Siti (20 years old)
- Elly Suhaili as Kak Pah
- Khaled Asharief as Azlan (14 years old)
- Qistina Khaled as Siti (14 years old)
- Azzal Amaliz as Fuad
- Adam Ikmal as Wafi
- Ewan Fauzi as Hairi
- Ej Lee as Azizi
- Een Efendi as Teacher Samsiah
- Sahronizam Noor as Teacher Sulaiman
- Hilmi Zerain as Lutfi
- Ayu Azlina as Kak Leha
- Naim Shamsol as JPN officer
- Faris as kawan Raymie

== Trivia ==
1. The drama Khunsa gets support and advice from certified health experts and the Department of Islamic Development Malaysia (JAKIM) in terms of religion to ensure the storyline is realistic and does not conflict with personalities.

2. The idea of this drama started in 2020 when Shahrulezad wanted to find a different story of benefit and awareness to the community, even he ran away from the drama phenomenon Nur. However, the "Khunsa" drama project will only be moved in 2022. He said the 28-episode drama was once rejected by a TV station for certain reasons, only Astro approved it.

3. Sherry Alhadad first brought an evil character to find a difference after she brought a comedy character synonymous with herself.

4. The filming location was carried out in a replica house located in Paya Wetland, Dengkil while the rest were in Kuala Lumpur and Kuala Kangsar, Perak.

5. Mhia Firdaus who played the role of Che Khun (14 - 20 years old) is the daughter of director Pitt Hanif (real name Firdaus Hanif) and her mother Farah Ahmad who played the same role for the age of 50.

== Awards and nominations ==
Year	Award	Category	Recipient	Result
2024	Asian Academy Creative Awards	Best Actor In a Supporting Role	Mikael Noah	Won
2024	Asian Academy Creative Awards	Best Direction (Fiction)	Shahrulezad Mohameddin	Won
2024	Asian Academy Creative Awards	Best Drama Series	MEASAT Broadcast Network Systems, Radius One	Won
