= Gerak Khas =

Gerak Khas (Malaysian Malay, 'special forces') may refer to:

- Gerak Khas (Malaysian Army unit)
  - 21st Special Service Group, the command overseeing Gerak Khas
- Gerak Khas (TV series), about a special police unit
  - Gerak Khas The Movie, a film based on the TV series

== See also ==
- Pasukan Gerakan Khas, the special operations command of the Royal Malaysia Police
