= Konsert Satu Suara, Vol. 2 =

- Concert by Siti Nurhaliza
- Location: Kuala Lumpur, Malaysia
- Venue: Istana Budaya
- Start date: November 7, 2015
- End date: November 8, 2015
- No. of shows: 2
- Supporting acts: Hetty Koes Endang and Ramli Sarip
- Attendance: 2500
- Budget: RM 500 000
- Box office: RM 650 000

Siti Nurhaliza concert chronology
- Dato' Siti Nurhaliza Unplugged 2015 (2015); Konsert Satu Suara, Vol. 2 (2015); Dato' Siti Nurhaliza & Friends Concert (2016)

Konsert Satu Suara, Vol. 2 (Malaysian for the One Voice, Vol. 2 Concert) was a two-day concerts by Malaysian recording artist, Siti Nurhaliza. She was accompanied by the Indonesian recording artist Hetty Koes Endang, and Singaporean recording artist Ramli Sarip. The concert was a continuation of her 2010 concert project, Konsert Satu Suara.

Unlike the previous installment of the concert where she and her company served as a guest artist and organizer respectively, Nuhaliza was the main singer for Konsert Satu Suara, Vol. 2. Although this concert served as a replacement for an eight-day musical theater about her life which was postponed, it was a success. Tickets sold days before the concert, and she and her supporting acts received positive reviews from critics for their vocals and showmanship.

In December 2015, with an attendance of 2500 people, the two-night concert was recognized as the highest-grossing locally produced concert at Istana Budaya when it grossed more than RM 650,000 from the sale of tickets alone.

== Background and development ==
"Siti, Ramli and Hetty are legends in their own right with distinctive voices and versatility that set them apart from other artistes across Southeast Asia. This winning pairing will bring together music lovers of all ages from Malaysia, Singapore and Indonesia to our theater. We are confident that the superb showmanship of the trio will truly make Konsert Satu Suara Vol. 2 a show to remember."

— Datuk Juhari Shaarani, Director-general of Istana Budaya during Konsert Satu Suara, Vol. 2's press conference.

Konsert Satu Suara, Vol. 2 was announced in October 2015 and staged in November 2015. It was Siti's contingency plan for the planned eight-day "bio-musical" theater about her life, which was postponed. The news of the postponement came to light in September 2015 when Siti was asked about its progress in an interview. On 5 October, she held a press conference at Istana Budaya to announce the news of Konsert Satu Suara, Vol. 2, her two-day concert with Hetty Koes Endang and Ramli Sarip which was to be held on 7 and 8 November at Istana Budaya. Citing the lack of sponsorship and financial constraints, she stated that the two-day concert was planned to take place as a replacement show for the same dates and venue that were rendered vacant upon the postponement of the originally planned theater. She commented on the situation, "Honestly [I am] not too disappointed when our first plan did not come to fruition. This is because we have been trying [to get a sponsorship] until late September but, unfortunately, the situation is not on our side. What [I am] sure is that there is a hikmah in all of these. Maybe I will be more prepared for the musical concert later." (Note: Original:"Sejujurnya tidaklah terlalu terkilan apabila rancangan awal tidak menjadi. Ini kerana pihak kami sudah mencuba sehingga hujung September namun keadaan masih tidak berpihak kepada kami. Apa yang pasti ada hikmah di sebalik semua ni. Mungkin saya akan lebih bersedia untuk konsert muzikal itu nanti.")

Upon realizing that she and her company had to call off the theater in September, Siti only had two months to reschedule another performance to fill the vacant dates and venue. Although the concert was initially a contingency plan, both Hetty and Ramli agreed to perform with Siti for the two-day concert after she had come up with a single concept, following a single phone call to each of them. On why Hetty was chosen as one of the supporting acts, Siti explained, "I’ve always admired Hetty. In fact, I grew up appreciating her music and I still fall under the spell of her angelic and soulful voice. [...] Getting her to join me on a stage for the first time is a dream come true and I’m so looking forward to our big day." As for Ramli, Siti commented, "He is our finest rocker and his music is full of love, passion, and soul. It’s always an honour to collaborate with him as we are both perfectionists who love great music from the heart." According to Siti, both guest stars, whom she considered legends, were the right choices given the fact that their vocals and showmanship are still "on point," even if they were both over fifty years of age. Preparation for the concert also included a meeting between three of them. In choosing suitable songs to perform, Siti first had to envision how both of her guests would perform the chosen songs. This concert also marked the first time these artists shared the stage for a concert.

Konsert Satu Suara, Vol. 2 was the second installment of the Konsert Satu Suara series to be organized by Siti's company, Siti Nurhaliza Productions, with a cost of RM 500 000. The first concert, organized in 2010, also took place at Istana Budaya. Unlike the first concert, where Siti was only a guest star for a concert by Aizat Amdan and Faizal Tahir, the second time around she took the center stage while being accompanied by two guests. The two-hour concert, featuring over 20 songs, had Aubrey Suwito as the musical director. All three artists performed a solo, duet, and trio. Most of the songs performed over the two nights of the concert were taken from their own compositions.

== Performances ==
=== Fashion and stage ===
Siti's makeup on the first night of the concert was provided by Deqsha, while on the second night it was applied by Epie Temerloh. Her wardrobe for both nights was provided by four local designers – Rizman Ruzaini, Ezuwan Ismail, Faizel Azraf and Qudyn.

=== Concert synopsis ===
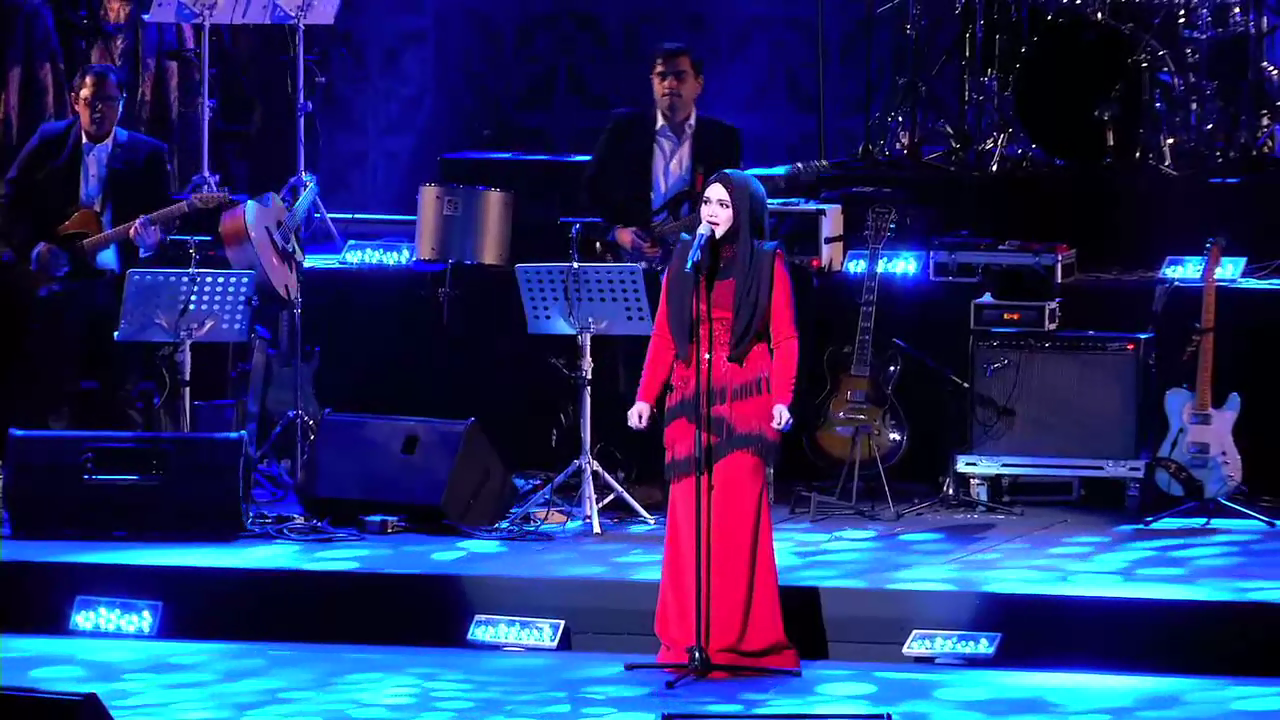
Siti Nurhaliza performing the opening song, "Sendiri", for the second night of the concert

The two-hour concert began with an opening performance by Siti. She performed "Sendiri", one of the songs from her album Adiwarna, which she rarely performs live. It was followed by a performance of one of the singles from her 2013 album, Fragmen, "Terbaik Bagimu". In the next performance, she recalled the moment when she was still a shy young girl who was too scared to perform in front of a crowd. What she usually did was to sing in front of a mirror all by herself to the singing styles of Hetty Koes Endang. After the brief recollection, she performed "Hati Lebur Jadi Debu", a song by Hetty, who was also the next performer. Hetty began by performing two songs she is famous for; "Hadirlah Kasih" and "Kasih". During the performance of "Hadirlah Kasih", Hetty even riffed an air guitar while performing the song. A usually "melancholic ballad", "Kasih" was given a bossa nova touch for the two nights of the concert.

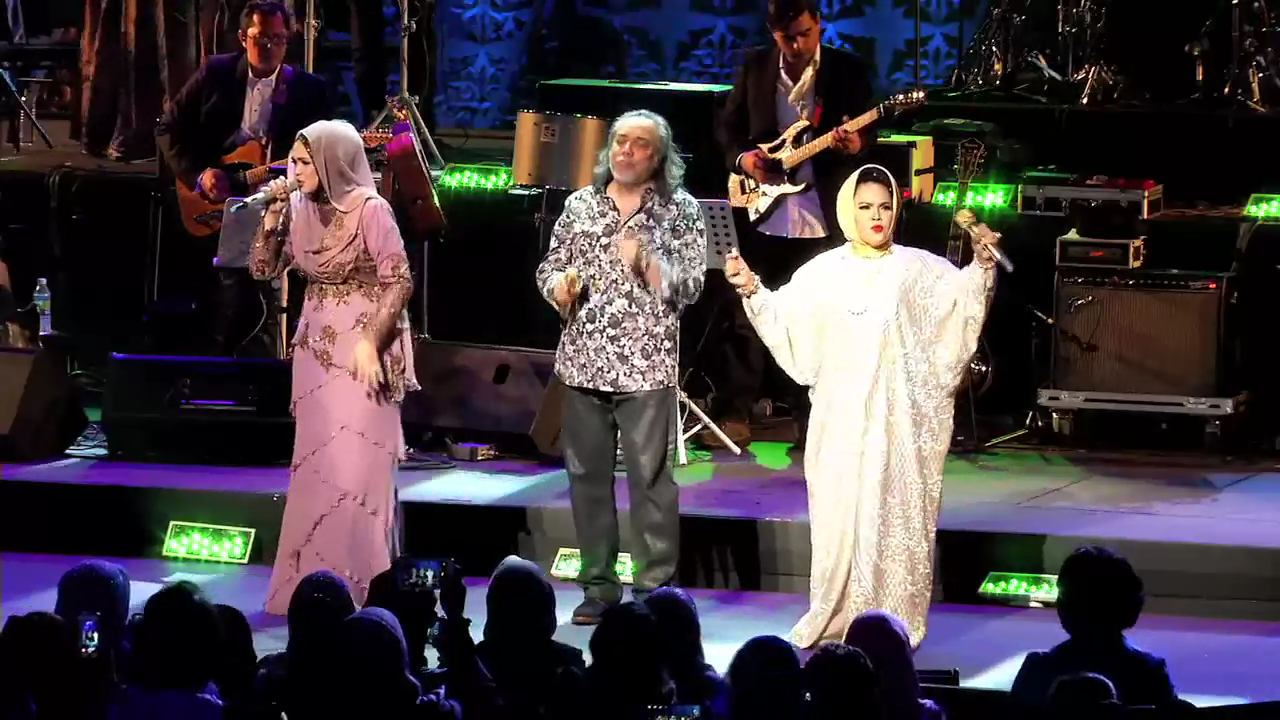
Siti Nurhaliza with Ramli Sarip and Hetty Koes Endang performing "Lagu Rindu", the second last song for the second night of the concert.

In the next part of the show, Siti returned to perform a medley of two other songs that she rarely performs live: "Bicara Manis Menghiris Kalbu" and "Kesilapanku Keegoanmu". The next four songs, "Bukan Cinta Biasa", "Pastikan", "Pedihnya Rasa", and "Rindu", were sung as duets by Siti and Hetty. "Bukan Cinta Biasa" was reworked to resemble traditional Malay music and keroncong. Siti then sang "Kamelia", a song made famous by Ramli Sarip. However, she changed the name from "Kamelia" to "Khalid Jiwa", the name of her husband. Before inviting Ramli to the stage, she recalled an incident when she was saved by Ramli when she almost fell into a pool of mud after a heavy downpour. Adding details to the story, Ramli also recalled the same incident when he signaled few men who were near Siti at that time not to touch her. The duo later performed "Dialah di Hati", "Teratai", "Doa Buat Kekasih" and "It Takes Two". Accompanied by a guest saxophonist, Jari, Ramli took the stage with his own solo performance of "Jikalau Berkasih" and "Budaya".^{[note 1]} After Ramli left the stage for his wardrobe change, Siti and Hetty performed a medley of "Kuda Hitam" and "Berdiri Bulu Romaku". For the final two songs of the night, Ramli joined Siti and Hetty on the stage to perform of "Lagu Rindu" and "Temasya Desa Gemalai".

== Critical response ==
"Overall, witnessing a concert [by] Siti, Ramli, and Hetty that are definitely popular in their respective birth country, their great vocals are out of the question. Backed by a five-star sound system and a good lighting, this concert has become the year's most perfect [concert]."

— Arif Nizam Abdullah, Malaysia Gazette (Note: Original:"Keseluruhannya, menyaksikan konsert Siti, Ramli dan Hetty yang sememangnya popular di negara kelahiran masing-masing, vokal mantap mereka tidak perlu dipertikaikan lagi. Dengan sokongan sistem bunyi bertaraf lima bintang dan pencahayaan yang baik, konsert ini menjadi paling sempurna untuk tahun ini.")

Overall, the concert received positive reviews from critics and reviewers. A number of critics questioned whether the collaboration would be successful, given that many of Siti's fans were relatively young, and unfamiliar with the songs of Ramli and Hetty. Izwan Mohd Isa of Kosmo! commented, "Before the concert begins, there was a moment in my heart, why can't Siti alone lead the concert as a solo? Surely she will lead [the concert] flawlessly. However, [after watching the concert], those early doubts have to be cast far away." (Note: Original:"Sebelum konsert bermula, ada juga terdetik di hati, mengapa tidak Siti sahaja yang mengemudi konsert tersebut secara solo? Sudah pasti beliau mampu mengemudinya tanpa sebarang cacat cela. Ternyata, telahan awal tersebut terpaksa dibuang jauh-jauh.")

The vocal performances of all three artists received positive reviews from the critics. Siti was praised for her vocal ability and dexterity. According to a reviewer from Utusan Malaysia, her vocals were able "to cause the body hair to stand on their ends", (Note: Original:"[...] membikin bulu roma berdiri [...]") while "her spoken material was amusing and she sang like a prized songbird effortlessly" according to Deric Etc. of Daily Seni. She was also praised for her ability to sing other artists' songs as her own. Ramlah Zainal of Harian Metro praised Ramli's vocals as "solid" and "unchanged" while Deric praised his voice as "booming, raspy vocals". Reviewers agreed that although Hetty was 58 during the concert, she showcased memorable performances. Deric Etc. of Daily Seni commented, "At the age of 58, Hetty Koes Endang had the entirety of Istana Budaya eating out of her hand. Her charisma, energy and sense of humour shone brighter than ever; Hetty launched Konsert Satu Suara into the stratosphere last Sunday night." He also added "Showcasing pipes of steel, the veteran singer’s voice has gained an impressive strength after all these years." His comments were echoed by other reviewers. A reviewer from Utusan Malaysia commented, "Yes, her energy at the age of 58 is so impressive and her aura is so potent up to the point of every performance of hers was given a standing ovation [by the audience] and can be praised as a spectacular performance." (Note: Original:"Ya, tenaganya di usia 58 tahun begitu mengagumkan dan auranya penuh bisa sehingga setiap persembahannya diberikan tepukan standing ovation dan boleh diangkat sebagai satu persembahan spectacular.") Arif Nizam Abdullah of Malaysia Gazette commented that watching a duet between Siti and Hetty was like watching "a vocal showdown". (Note: Original:"[...] satu pertarungan vokal.") He also added, at certain points of the concert, it was hard to discern to whom the notes belong, especially during the parts in the higher register. According to him, Siti personally acknowledged that she was blown away by Hetty during the concert. Many critics stated that the vocal comparisons were unfair, given how the artists differed in term of voice and experience. Zaidi Mohamad of Berita Harian stated "[...] this performance is not about a vocal war or their influences, on the contrary, all three figures have emphasized that they are united in the name of music. There was no questions on who is better or who can belts songs with high registers, because they are all [here] to entertain their beloved fans." (Note: Original:"[...] persembahan ini bukan mengenai perang vokal atau pengaruh mereka, sebaliknya ketiga-tiga figura ini menegaskan mereka bersatu hati atas paksi muzik. Tak timbul soal siapa lebih hebat atau siapa yang mampu menarik lagu bernada tinggi, kerana mereka hanya sekadar mahu menghiburkan peminat tercinta.")

The choice of songs received mixed reviews. Deric Etc. of Daily Seni commented that the songs performed were mostly "downtempo love songs" with "barely any upbeat numbers to help perk up sleepy audience members." Shazryn Mohd. Faizal of The Rakyat Post, on the other hand, preferred the duet between Ramli and Siti with the song "It Takes Two" was replaced with a more memorable duet song. Kamaruddin Razal of Murai, however, said that the duet of "It Takes Two" further showcased Siti's versatility as a multi-talented entertainer. Critics, however, praised the new arrangements for many of the songs that were performed during the two days of the concert.

Most of the reviewers and critics agreed that the concert, though it began as a contingency plan, left an immense impact. and generally was a success. Deric Etc. of Daily Seni concluded his review with "This writer, who went to Istana Budaya merely to watch Siti Nurhaliza, ended the night with newfound interest for Malay music of the seventies, eighties and nineties. Now, if only we can get more young Malaysians to watch this sort of thing."

== Set list ==
Siti Nurhaliza being interviewed by MeleTOP right after the final night of the show.

1. "Sendiri"
2. "Terbaik Bagimu"
3. "Hati Lebur Jadi Debu"
4. "Hadirlah Kasih"
5. "Kasih"
6. First Medley
  1. "Bicara Manis Menghiris Kalbu"
  2. "Kesilapanku Keegoanmu"
7. Second Medley
  1. "Bukan Cinta Biasa"
  2. "Pastikan"
8. Third Medley
  1. "Pedihnya Rasa"
  2. "Rindu"
9. "Kamelia"
10. Fourth Medley
  1. "Dialah di Hati"
  2. "Teratai Bunga Indah"
11. "Doa Buat Kekasih"
12. "It Takes Two"
13. "Jikalau Berkasih"
14. "Budaya"
15. Fifth Medley
  1. "Kuda Hitam"
  2. "Berdiri Bulu Romaku"
16. "Lagu Rindu"
17. "Temasya Desa Gemalai"

Source: Adapted from concert's press release.

== Commercial performance ==
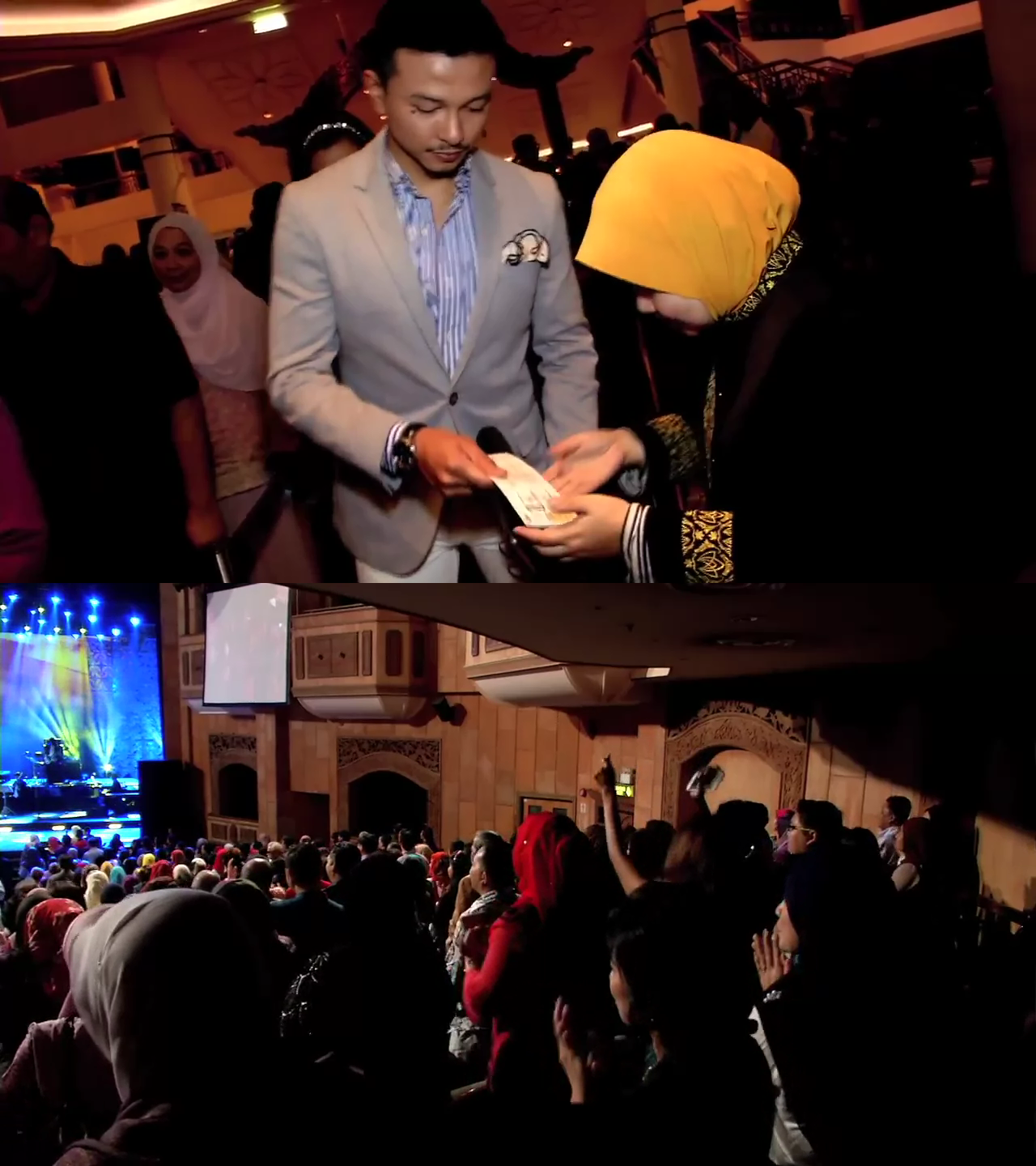
The admission process and the crowd from the right side of the stalls area of Istana Budaya during the concert.

The concert was announced on 5 October 2015, and 80 percent of the tickets sold out in less than a month after they became available on 9 October. Listed from RM 78 to RM 518, the tickets were made available for online purchase from the online ticket vendor AirAsiaRedTix.com. The tickets were also available for manual pick-up from various select official physical ticket vendors. Datuk Juhari Shaarani, Istana Budaya's Director-general, commented in an interview that "Anything that involves Siti Nurhaliza, [has] never failed, especially her concerts. Siti is definitely still excellent as a crowd puller. [She can] organize any kinds of concerts at IB (Istana Budaya), [and] the results will be out of the ordinary." (Note: Original:"Apa sahaja yang membabitkan Siti Nurhaliza, tidak pernah gagal terutama konsertnya. Siti sememangnya masih unggul sebagai crowd puller. Buatlah apa sahaja konsert di IB, hasilnya memang luar biasa.")

In late December 2015, it was revealed that with attendance of 2500 people, Konsert Satu Suara, Vol. 2 generated more than RM 650 000 from the sale of tickets. Konsert Satu Suara, Vol. 2 was also crowned as the highest-grossing locally produced concert at Istana Budaya for 2015.

== Footnote ==
- Note 1: A news report by Shazryn Mohd. Faizal of The Rakyat Post, stated that Ramli Sarip performed "Jikalau Berkasih" and "Istilah Bercinta" for his solo during both nights of the concert. This may have been an error in reporting, since the original final press release lists him as performing "Jikalau Berkasih" and "Budaya" instead of "Jikalau Berkasih" and "Istilah Bercinta".
