= Jessie Chung =

- Born: Kuching, Malaysia
- Occupations: singer; songwriter; actress; author; nutritional consultant
- Years active: 1998–present

Chinese name
- Traditional Chinese: 鍾潔希
- Simplified Chinese: 钟洁希
Transcriptions
Yue: Cantonese
- Jyutping: Zung1 Git3 Hei1
Southern Min
- Hokkien POJ: Cheng Kiat-hi
- Musical career
- Origin: Malaysia
- Genres: Pop; alternative rock; Mandopop; electronic rock
- Instruments: Vocals; electric organ; guitar; piano
- Label: Warner Music Group
- Website: Official Jessie Chung Website

Jessie Chung (simplified Chinese: 钟洁希; traditional Chinese: 鍾潔希; pinyin: ZhōngJiéXī; Jyutping: Zung1 Git3 Hei1; Pe̍h-ōe-jī: Cheng Kiat-hi) is an Australian-based musician, singer, songwriter, actress, author, naturopath, and nutritional consultant.

She released her album Home in 1998 and There is a Decision in 2000. After a 5-year hiatus, she released Loving You in 2006. She is currently active in China, Southeast Asia, and Australia, and has released nine albums since the beginning of her career, most notably Love in You, Tearless Sky, There You Are and Be Strong. She currently serves as president of the Malaysia Naturopathic Association (MNA) and vice-president of the Malaysian Anti-Cancer Association (MACA). She has written several medical publications, including, Stay Away from Cancer and Stay Away from Diseases, and is the author of the Jessie Diary series.

== Career ==
=== Early years ===
Jessie Chung, a descendant of the Hakka lineage from Dapu, Guangzhou, was born in Kuching, Malaysia. She is the second child in her family, with one elder sister, three younger sisters, and one younger brother. Chung grew up with a musical background and passed grade 8 organ at a young age. As a child and teenager, she participated extensively in singing competitions. She wanted to pursue a full-time musical career after graduating from high school, but in the end, she chose to focus on her studies. After graduating from university, Chung joined the medical and healthcare industry and founded Natural Health Farm.

=== 2006–2011: Career beginnings ===
In 2006, Chung released Loving You with Symphony Musical House. The album was produced by Deng Zhi Zhang and contains 10 original tracks.

In 2007, Jessie Chung began authoring and published her first book, Jessie Diary. The latest book in the series is Jessie Diary 7: A Starry Sky.

In 2009, Chung released Message of Love from the Moon through Symphony Musical House.

In 2011, Chung released I Just Fall in Love Again through Symphony Musical House.

=== 2012–2014: Love in You and acting ===
In 2012, Chung invited Jet Yi and Wu Guan Yan to produce her album. They wrote ten songs and five song lyrics, while Chung herself wrote the lyrics for the other five. On 30 November 2012, Chung abandoned US$33 million of inheritance and released Love in You in Taiwan. Her husband appeared to show his support. The album topped Ai FM's Chart in Malaysia, occupying the number one spot for two consecutive weeks. The eponymous single "Love in You" was chosen as the theme song and ending theme for Fox Networks Group's Korean drama Secret Garden.

Chung held her first concert in Taipei, the Love in You Concert on 21 December 2012. Her ex-fiancée flew from the US while her mother-in-law flew from Malaysia to attend the concert.

In 2013, Chung starred as lead actress in the Griffin Group production Faces, playing Li Yu and Yuan Yuan, the main character. Jackie Lui starred as the lead actor while supporting actors include Liu Hua, Law Kar-ying, and Cheng Pei-pei.

Chung was inducted into the Chinese Who's Who Society in 2013.

Near the end of 2013, Chung starred in Unchanging Love, a film production organized by the students of One World Hanxing College of Journalism and Communication. Proceeds of the film went to fund treatments of underprivileged cancer patients.

In 2014, Chung cameoed in the movie Kungfu Taboo, sharing the screen with Kara Wai, Frederick Lee, and Henry Thia.

=== 2015–2016: Tearless Sky ===
On 21 May 2015, Chung released Tearless Sky, an album that also presents itself as a self-narrative. Renowned variety show host Hsu Nai-lin came to her album release party to show his support. The album rose to 6th place on the Pop Radio Top Ten Music Chart, 20th place on Five Music's Mandarin Chart and 4th place on the i Radio Top Hits Chart.

On 4 June 2015, Jessie Chung was invited to appear on the Taiwanese variety show Kangsi Coming. She was also invited to many other TV shows including Genius Go Go Go, GTO Reunion, Hot Door Night, 100% Entertainment, etc.

On 30 June 2015, Chung performed the Tearless Sky Concert in Taipei.

On 21 September 2015, Faces, starring Chung and Jackie Lui, premiered in Malaysia.

On 17 October 2015, Chung held her solo concert, the Love Unity Concert, to fund treatments of underprivileged cancer patients. Guest artists included Malaysian singers Fauziah Latiff and Ziana Zain, and the concert raised RM170,000.

On 12 November 2015, Chung signed with Beijing CTV Star Culture Development Co., the same label that Eric Moo is signed to.

On 6 May 2016, Chung opened the avant-garde Exquisite Chinese Orchestra Concert. She was accompanied by a 22-piece Chinese orchestra while she performed many classic songs, making her the first Malaysian act to completely replace a modern band with a traditional Chinese orchestra in concert. Ten shows in total were played in both West and East Malaysia.

On 28 May 2016, Chung was cast as the main character Yang Xiao Fan in Moonlight, a large-scale stage production based on a true story. The stage play was shown all across Malaysia, and all proceeds went to fund treatments of underprivileged cancer patients. During the third performance, Chung accidentally sprained her ankle but continued to perform until the curtain call, despite the pain.

=== 2016–2017: Australian record deal and Be Strong ===
In 2016, Jessie Chung signed to Future Entertainment & Music Group Australia to prepare for her debut in the international music scene and began to record the album There You Are.

On 23 August 2016, Jessie Chung released her debut English album There You Are. Ditching her usual softer personality, Jessie chose to rock a blonde hairstyle and rebellious obsidian dress to fit in with the new genre of her album. Future Entertainment & Music Group Australia's CEO appeared at the release party to congratulate her.

On 23 August 2016, Chung released her debut English album There You Are. Future Entertainment & Music Group Australia's CEO appeared at the release party to congratulate her.

On 24 August 2016, Chung started her There You Are Concert Tour, completing five shows in Kuala Lumpur, Penang, and Kuching.

On 30 October 2016, Chung brought her There You Are Tour to Taipei Ximending.

On 13 November 2016, Chung's album There You Are peaked at No.2 on Five Music's International Chart and No.2 on i Radio's International Chart, becoming the first Malaysian singer to enter into Five Music's International Chart. Her record label presented her with the Outstanding Achievement Award.

On 16 December 2016, Chung released her second Australian-produced English rock album, Be Strong. At the press conference, Chung received the title “Princess of Rock” and a diamond-studded guitar as a gift from her record label.

From 18 December 2016 to May 2017, Jessie Chung toured across Malaysia with the Be Strong Concert Tour. She also performed in China and Taiwan, bringing her shows to a total of 16 different cities.

On 30 December 2016, Chung's album There You Are achieved platinum status.

On 3 February 2017, during Chinese New Year, Chung was struck on the nose by her partner in a badminton match and was sent to the emergency room.

On 7 May 2017, a press conference for the release of Be Strong was held in Taipei, Taiwan.

On 19 May 2017, Chung's album Be Strong sold over 15,000 physical copies and achieved platinum status. In addition, the album topped both Five Music's International Chart and i Radio's International Chart with two No.1 positions, and the eponymous single shot to No.3 on UFO Radio's International Top Singles Chart. The music videos of Be Strong also exceeded 5 million views on YouTube.

=== 2018 - present: Stage Play ===
In December 2017, Chung was cast as the lead female role Sandy in Music Box, a large-scale stage production adapted from a true story and produced by Australian producer Neil McLean. The stage play was performed in Taiwan, Indonesia and all across Malaysia. All proceeds went to fund treatments of underprivileged cancer patients.

On 3 July 2020 to 18 July 2020, Chung was cast as the lead female role Yinglan Shia in the stage play Meant to Be, together with American actor Paul Lee.

On 24 July 2020 to 23 August 2020, Chung was cast as the lead female role Lin Daiyu in the stage play adaptation of the renowned Chinese novel The Dream of Red Mansions (Chinese: 紅樓夢), with a total of 13 shows.

On 28 August 2020 to 13 September 2020, Chung was cast as the lead female role Du Xiaomeng in the stage play Tearless Sky, with a total of 8 shows.

On 26 September 2020 to 4 October 2020, Chung was cast as the lead female role He Peirou in the stage play Afterglow, with a total of 4 shows, which was interrupted due to the lockdown during the pandemic.

On 25 February 2023, Chung was cast as the lead female role of Zhu Yingtai in the stage play adaptation of the Chinese legend Butterfly Lovers, together with 35 casts from Taiwan, US, Australia, and Malaysia.

=== 2025 - present: My Style, Dekati and Six Feet Deep ===
In early 2025, Chung released two studio albums: her twelfth Chinese album *My Style* (Chinese: 《我就是我》), and her first Malay-language album *Dekati*, both through Future Global Entertainment Australia. She also released the bilingual single "Tak Terpisah", a duet with iconic Malaysian singer Fauziah Latiff, which accumulated significant regional streams and media attention.

Chung launched her *My Style World Tour* on 27 May 2025 at the Arena of Stars, Genting Highlands, Malaysia. The concert ran for approximately three hours, featuring a 30-piece band, three languages (Mandarin, English, and Malay), and produced "non‑stop energy" according to the staging team.

In mid‑2025, Chung released the English-language EP *Six Feet Deep*, which contains four tracks and was released on Apple Music/streaming platforms. The title track received radio airplay across Asian stations including Asian Hitz Radio China.

== Marriage ==
On 12 November 2005, Chung was married to Joshua Beh at the Riverside Majestic Hotel in Kuching. Their marriage is not supported or recognized under Malaysia's law and they never received their marriage certificates from the government due to the fact that she was a male (transgender) and married to a male. They have stated that the situation is understandable under the Malaysian constitution that forbids same sex marriage. On 7 May 2017, at the press conference for the release of Be Strong, Chung's artist manager brought her and Joshua their Australian permanent residence certificate and stated that Chung and her husband will soon legally register their marriage in Australia and hold a wedding once again at Gold Coast.

== Discography ==
No.	Album name	Label	Released	Language	Notes
1	Home (充满爱的心)	-	1998	Mandarin	
2	There Is a Decision (有了决定)	-	2000	Mandarin	
3	Loving You (爱你)	Symphony Musical House	20 January 2007	Mandarin	
4	Message of Love from the Moon (明月千里寄相思)	Symphony Musical House	13 March 2009	Mandarin	
5	I Just Fall in Love Again	Symphony Musical House	13 January 2012	English	
6	Love in You (爱在转瞬间)	Symphony Musical House	20 November 2012	Mandarin	No.1 album on Ai FM's Chart in Malaysia for multiple weeks
7	Tearless Sky (没有泪的天空)	Warner Music Malaysia Symphony Musical House	15 May 2015	Mandarin	Peaked at No.6 on Taiwan's Pop Radio Top Ten Music Chart; Reached No.20 on Five Music's Mandarin Chart; Reached No.4 on i Radio's Top Hits Chart
8	There You Are	Warner Music Malaysia Future Global Entertainment Australia	24 September 2016	English	Reached No.2 on Five Music's International Chart (Only second to Lady Gaga), ranked above Sia who released an album the same week; Reached No.2 on i Radio's International Chart; Reached No.6 on Baidu's New Song Chart, Baidu's Hot Chart, and Baidu's Golden Hits Chart.; Sold over 15,000 physical copies, received Platinum Record
9	Be Strong	Warner Music Malaysia Future Global Entertainment Australia	15 December 2016	English	Peaked at No.1 on Five Music's International Chart in Taiwan; Peaked at No.1 on i Radio's International Chart in Taiwan; Reached No.3 on UFO Radio's International Top Singles Chart in Taiwan; Sold over 15,000 physical copies, received Platinum Record
10	MyStyle（我就是我）	Future Global Entertainment Australia	2025	Chinese	
11	Dekati	Future Global Entertainment Australia	2025	Malay	
12	Six Feet Deep	Future Global Entertainment Australia	2025	English	
13	Mari Menari Raya		2026	Malay	With featuring AC Mizal

== Concert tours ==
Title	No. of Shows	Location	Date	Notes
Love in You Concert	1 show	Taiwan	21 December 2012	
Tearless Sky Concert	2 shows	Taiwan	3 June 2015	
Tearless Sky Concert	2 shows	Malaysia	1 July 2015	Guest artist: Yi Jet Qi
Love Unity Concert	1 show	Malaysia Megastar Arena	17 October 2015	Guest artists: Fauziah Latiff and Ziana Zain
Exquisite Chinese Orchestra Concert	10 shows	Shah Alam Performing Arts Centre	24 March 2016	Accompanied by a traditional Chinese orchestra to disseminate Chinese culture
Exquisite Chinese Orchestra Concert	10 shows	Shah Alam Performing Arts Centre	26 March 2016	Accompanied by a traditional Chinese orchestra to disseminate Chinese culture
Exquisite Chinese Orchestra Concert	10 shows	Shah Alam Performing Arts Centre	2 April 2016	Accompanied by a traditional Chinese orchestra to disseminate Chinese culture
Exquisite Chinese Orchestra Concert	10 shows	Shah Alam Performing Arts Centre	9 April 2016	Accompanied by a traditional Chinese orchestra to disseminate Chinese culture
Exquisite Chinese Orchestra Concert	10 shows	Shah Alam Performing Arts Centre	16 April 2016	Accompanied by a traditional Chinese orchestra to disseminate Chinese culture
Exquisite Chinese Orchestra Concert	10 shows	Shah Alam Performing Arts Centre	23 April 2016	Accompanied by a traditional Chinese orchestra to disseminate Chinese culture
Exquisite Chinese Orchestra Concert	10 shows	Shah Alam Performing Arts Centre	30 April 2016	Accompanied by a traditional Chinese orchestra to disseminate Chinese culture
Exquisite Chinese Orchestra Concert	10 shows	Shah Alam Performing Arts Centre	21 May 2016	Accompanied by a traditional Chinese orchestra to disseminate Chinese culture
Exquisite Chinese Orchestra Concert	10 shows	Kenyalang Theatre, Kuching	21 June 2016	Accompanied by a traditional Chinese orchestra to disseminate Chinese culture
Exquisite Chinese Orchestra Concert	10 shows	Shah Alam Performing Arts Centre	28 June 2016	Accompanied by a traditional Chinese orchestra to disseminate Chinese culture
There You Are Concert Tour	5 shows	(Malaysia) Setia Alam	24 August 2016	
There You Are Concert Tour	5 shows	Kuching	28 August 2016	
There You Are Concert Tour	5 shows	Sunway Plaza	2 September 2016	
There You Are Concert Tour	5 shows	Penang	21 October 2016	
There You Are Concert Tour	5 shows	(Taiwan) Taipei Ximending	31 October 2016	
Be Strong Concert Tour	16 shows	Shah Alam Performing Arts Centre	18 December 2016	
Be Strong Concert Tour	16 shows	Dongguan, China	23 December 2016	
Be Strong Concert Tour	16 shows	Kelana Jaya	31 December 2016	
Be Strong Concert Tour	16 shows	Klang	1 January 2017	
Be Strong Concert Tour	16 shows	Kepong	6 January 2017	
Be Strong Concert Tour	16 shows	Kuala Lumpur	7 January 2017	
Be Strong Concert Tour	16 shows	Kluang, Johor	13 January 2017	
Be Strong Concert Tour	16 shows	Johor Bahru	14 January 2017	
Be Strong Concert Tour	16 shows	Butterworth, Penang	19 January 2017	
Be Strong Concert Tour	16 shows	Ipoh, Perak	22 January 2017	
Be Strong Concert Tour	16 shows	Kuching, Sarawak	5 February 2017	
Be Strong Concert Tour	16 shows	Kuantan	10 February 2017	
Be Strong Concert Tour	16 shows	Melaka	12 February 2017	
Be Strong Concert Tour	16 shows	Genting Highlands	16 February 2017	
Be Strong Concert Tour	16 shows	Taipei Ximending	6 May 2017	
Be Strong Concert Tour	16 shows	Setia Alam	24 May 2017	
My Style Concert	1 show	Genting Highlands Star Arena	27 May 2025	Guest artists: Fauziah Latiff

== Acting career ==
=== Theatre ===
Year	Production	Role	No. of Shows	Theater	Notes
2016	Moonlight	Yang Xiao Fan (main character)	10 shows	Kuala Lumpur Performing Arts Centre (KLPAC)	18 October 2016
2016	Moonlight	Yang Xiao Fan (main character)	10 shows	Penang PAC	20–21 August 2016
2016	Moonlight	Yang Xiao Fan (main character)	10 shows	Kenyalang Theatre, Kuching	12 June 2016
2016	Moonlight	Yang Xiao Fan (main character)	10 shows	Shah Alam Performing Arts Centre (SPAC)	7–28 May 2016
2017-2018	Music Box	Sandy Qin (main character)	17 shows	Clapper Studio, Taipei	31 March 2018
2017-2018	Music Box	Sandy Qin (main character)	17 shows	Auditorium of Universitas Negeri Padang, Indonesia	7 March 2018
2017-2018	Music Box	Sandy Qin (main character)	17 shows	Kuala Lumpur Performing Arts Centre (KLPAC)	16 January 2018
2017-2018	Music Box	Sandy Qin (main character)	17 shows	Penang Performing Arts Centre (Penang PAC)	27 January 2018
2017-2018	Music Box	Sandy Qin (main character)	17 shows	Damansara Performing Arts Centre (DPAC)	3 March 2018
2017-2018	Music Box	Sandy Qin (main character)	17 shows	Kenyalang Theatre, Kuching	17 March 2018
2017-2018	Music Box	Sandy Qin (main character)	17 shows	Paragon International School Auditorium, Johor	20 January 2018
2017-2018	Music Box	Sandy Qin (main character)	17 shows	Jabatan Kebudayaan dan Kesenian Negara, Sabah	14 April 2018
2017-2018	Music Box	Sandy Qin (main character)	17 shows	Symphony Theatre	15 December 2017 19 December 2017 21 December 2017 23 December 2017 30 December 2017 6 January 2018 13 January 2018 4 February 2018 7 April 2018
2020	Meant to Be	YingLan Shia (main character)	8 shows	Symphony Theatre	3 July 2020 - 18 July 2020
2020	Dream of the Red Mansions	Lin Daiyu (main character)	13 shows	Symphony Theatre	24 July 2020 - 23 August 2020
2020	Tearless Sky	Du Xiaomeng (main character)	8 shows	Symphony Theatre	28 August 2020 - 13 September 2020
2020	Afterglow	He Peirou (main character)	4 shows	Symphony Theatre	26 September 2020 - 4 October 2020
2023	Butterfly Lovers	Zhu Yingtai	6 shows	Symphony Theatre	25 February 2023 - 9 April 2023
2023	Butterfly Lovers	Zhu Yingtai	6 shows	Kuala Lumpur Performing Arts Centre (KLPAC)	26 March 2023

=== Film ===
Title	Role	Release date	Other Actors
Unchanging Love	Sister (main character)	(Malaysia) 2014	
Kungfu Taboo	Cameo	(Malaysia) 25 February 2015	Kara Hui, Frederick Lee, Henry Thia
Faces	Li Yu; Yuan Yuan after plastic surgery (main character)	(Malaysia) 23 September 2015	Jackie Lui, Law Kar-ying, Cheng Pei-pei
