= Dendam Seorang Isteri =

2022 Malaysian television series

- Promotional poster
- Also known as: Revenge of a Wife; Temptation of Wife; Wife's Revenge
- Dendam Seorang Isteri
- Genre: Revenge; Romance; Soap Opera; Melodrama
- Created by: Radius One Sdn Bhd
- Based on: Temptation of Wife by Kim Soon-ok
- Written by: Suzanna Zaily Zin; Marr Mohamad; Lynnda Sharudin; Pahzai Al-Khaired
- Directed by: Uchee Fukada; Nizam Zakaria
- Creative director: Shahrulezad Mohameddin
- Starring: Fasha Sandha; Wan Raja; Nad Zainal; Aidit Noh
- Theme music composer: Amylea Azizan
- Opening theme: Kesumat - Rian Shain geming jiwa - aufahanie
- Ending theme: Getas - Heidi Moru
- Composer: Amylea Azizan
- Country of origin: Malaysia
- Original language: Malay
- No. of seasons: 1
- No. of episodes: 85

Production
- Executive producer: Hisham A. Karim
- Producer: Shahrulezad Mohameddin
- Running time: 40 minutes
- Production company: Radius One Sdn Bhd

Original release
- Network: Astro Prima (Slot Tiara)
- Release: 21 March – 15 July 2022

Related
- Temptation of Wife (South Korean TV series)

Dendam Seorang Isteri (English: Revenge of a Wife) is a 2022 Malaysian television series starring Fasha Sandha, Nad Zainal, Wan Raja and Aidit Noh. This series is a remake from the popular South Korean television series titled "Temptation of Wife". It was aired on Astro Prima, every Monday to Friday, 18:00.p.m (MST) that was broadcast on March 21, 2022 to July 15, 2022.

== Synopsis ==
Amira is an innocent and selfless girl. Hailing from the countryside, she married Harris who is a hedonistic playboy who only thinks about himself. Harris family is a wealthy one, with Harris' father, Mustapha owning a construction firm, Radius Constructions. Together, they live with Mona, Amira's devious, gold-digging mother in-law, Hilda, Harris' sister and Ayu, Mustapha's sister.

Amira is treated like a maid in the house rather than a housewife by her mother-in law and is unable to maintain her good looks due to all the work she done. Her mother in-law consistently repeated that she does not approve her marriage due to them being from a "lowly class". Amira works hard to satisfy everyone except herself. All of this while Harris does not care about her at all.

Enter Kirana. She's an orphan who lived with Amira's family since childhood. Amira's family thought they had nurtured Kirana with love and care, little did they knew Kirana had an affair with Harris during their marriage and he sponsored Kirana's study in Dubai. Now she's back, but she had to deal with Syafiq, Amira's brother who presumed he and Kirana were an item during Kirana's livelihood with them. Kirana returns to Kuala Lumpur with a plan, a plan that will "disappoint a whole lot of people", said herself to Amira. She held a grudge and felt that she was treated as a maid with Amira's family and does not regard Amira's family as hers. Harris was shocked to see her return but they still meet up behind Amira from time to time. Kirana is a go-getter, and she is eager to publicise her relationship to everyone, bit by bit.

At the same time, Lady Diana is a rich lady with a tumultuous past. Nellisa is her biological daughter and Naufal is her foster son. Naufal does his best in his foster mother's interest as a way to repay her love and kindness and he would do anything to not disappoint Lady Diana. Nellisa has a crush on Naufal. Naufal presumed Diana would disown him for showing romantic affection to Nellisa and he rejects Nellisa abruptly. Nellisa slowly goes psycho and set up a ceremony for their wedding at a villa by the beach, where eventually she drowned herself in the sea in disappointment as Naufal did not show up. Lady Diana and Naufal's relationship became strained due to Nellisa's death.

As Harris and Kirana's affair became public, needless to say, Kirana and Amira family's relationship turned sour and Syafiq begged Kirana and he loved her deeply. Amira became frustrated but Mona have a good impression on Kirana and welcomed her to the family. In the end, Amira became pregnant, yet Harris was eager to be with Kirana so he took Amira to the abortion clinic where Amira fought for her life. Eventually, Harris brought her to the beach and drowned her.

In the search for Nellisa, Naufal found Amira's body swept by the waves. He rescued her amidst her family thought she was dead. She slowly restarted her life, acquiring odd jobs and looking for places to stay. When Diana's spa held a makeup competition, she joined using Nellisa's name which drew Diana's attention and she picked her as the winner. Diana later investigated Amira's life and knew the truth. Amira told them everything, about the evildoing of Harris' family and his infidelity. Diana helped her to get her revenge as she also had a past with Mustapha.

She changed her look and name and now Diana's spa rivals Kirana's. The new Nellisa also seduced Harris and try to steal him from Kirana. What will happen next? How will Amira survive as Nellisa? Will Harris and Kirana get the payment for their evildoings?

== Cast ==
=== Main cast ===
- Fasha Sandha as Amira/Nelissa
- Wan Raja as Harris
- Nad Zainal as Kirana
- Aidit Noh as Naufal

=== Supporting actors ===
- Roy Azman as Dato' Mustafa
- Ziema Din as Datin Mona
- Zarynn Min as Kak Baby (Ayu Alia)
- Dian P. Ramlee as Ain
- Sharmaine Farouk as Lady Diana
- GM Fauzan as Sulaiman
- Sefik Khair as Syafiq
- Amylea Azizan as Nelissa
- Kween Keela as Hilda
- Owen Yusof as Zaidi

== Soundtrack ==
- "Kesumat" - Rian Shain (released on June 13, 2022)
- "Seperti Dia" (2022 version)" - Amylea Azizan (Unreleased)
- "Seperti Dia" (Male Version)" - Adzrin (released on September 13, 2023)
- "Getas" - Heidi Moru (Closing theme) (released on June 17, 2022)
- "Geming Jiwa" - Aufahanie (released on June 3, 2022)

== Viewership ==
- Dendam Seorang Isteri record its own history, reach 5.5 million views on Astro Prima channel.
