= Abby Abadi =

Malaysian singer, host and actress (born 1977)

- ابي عبادي
- Born: Arbaiyah binti Abdul Manan; December 1, 1977 (age 48); Kuala Lumpur, Malaysia
- Occupations: Singer, host, celebrity
- Years active: 1995–present
- Height: 165 cm (5 ft 5 in)

Arbaiyah Abdul Manan, known professionally as Abby Abadi (born 1 December 1977), is a Malaysian singer, host and actress. She is best known as one of the members of the Malaysian girl group Elite, which gained success in the late 1990s and early 2000s and known for her role as Inspector (later DSP) Aleeza in the longest-running Malaysian action drama series Gerak Khas, where she is one of the six original cast members. She won the Anugerah Bintang Popular Berita Harian for Most Popular TV Actress five times, between 2000, 2001, 2002, and 2003.

== Career ==
Abby Abadi started out as one of the members of the KRU's first Malaysian girl group named Elite and the when she was just 18 years old. Abadi has released two albums with the group and left in 1998.

Her acting career started in 1999 when she landed the lead role as Inspector (later DSP) Aleeza in longest-running Malaysian police procedural television series, Gerak Khas where she also sang the series' theme music with co-star AC Mizal. The series was originally set as a year-long series, but due to its continuous success and consistent top rating, the series was extended for an indefinite time until it finally ended on March 27, 2021, with a total of 20 seasons and 1,054 episodes. Abadi appeared in all seasons except seasons 14 to 18.

== Personal life ==
Abby Abadi married her Gerak Khas co-star, Norman Hakim, in 2002. Norman and Abby was legally divorced (talak satu) at the Gombak Timur Shariah Court in 2008. They have three children together: Mohamed Danish Hakim, Marissa Dania, and Maria Danisha.

Four years after her divorce from Norman Hakim, Abby married Muhammad Noor Farhan Che Bakar. He is 12 years younger than her. Their marriage only lasted for a year. They divorced on 9 May 2014.

She married her third husband, Muhammad Faizal Zakaria, in 2015.

=== Involvement in politics ===
Abby Abadi joined the Malaysian Islamic Party (PAS) and received criticism for the decision due to her lifestyle. Abby is working with Hairi Othman to improve the image of PAS.

She was said to have married a PAS assembly member Mohd Zaki Ibrahim. However, she denied the claims.

== Controversy ==
=== Controversial comments about Islam ===
Abby is quite vocal in voicing her opinion on Islamic teaching. Ever since she became a member of PAS, she began giving sermons and teachings.

Because most of her views contradicts the teachings of Islam, Abby was condemned in the Malaysian blogosphere. In a Malay language portal, it shows that Abby stated that, the reason for all the things that she has done in PAS is for the benefits of her friends, family and the society. She believes that her work in PAS can guarantee her salvation in the afterlife.

=== Feud with religious scholar ===
Because of her controversial comments on Islam, Abby was criticized by Mohd Asri Zainul Abidin. Abby and Mohd Asri fight on Facebook And Twitter. Abby has also been questioned by PAS member and religious teacher Ustaz Azhar Idrus. Azhar Idrus suggested that Abby must further her studies and conduct extensive research on subjects that she wanted to comment.

== Filmography ==
=== Film ===
Year	Title	Role	Notes
2000	Pasrah	Fiza	Debut film appearances
2001	Gerak Khas The Movie	Inspector Aleeza	
2002	Gerak Khas The Movie II	Inspector Aleeza	
2005	GK3 The Movie	Inspector Aleeza	
2005	Sembilu 2005	Teacher Abby	
2007	Skrip 7707	Liza	
2010	Andartu Terlampau...21 Hari Mencari Suami	Sarah	

=== Television series ===
Year	Title	Role	TV channel
1999–2011 2019–2021	Gerak Khas	DSP Aleeza	TV1, TV2, TV3
2000	Maria Mariana The Series	Maria	TV3
2007	Manjalara	Zaza Abdullah	TV3
2008	Vice Versa	Norin	TV3
2008–2010	Hikayat Putera Shazlan	Mak Som	Astro Ceria
2009	Julia Juli	Princess Balqis	TV3
2009	Segalanya Ku Terima	Sofea	TV3
2009	Jongkang Jongkit	Mimi	Astro Warna
2010	Ilusi	Kak Lia	TV3
2010	Habil & Qabil	Intan	TV3
2012	Pelangi Kasih	Maimon	TV3

=== Telemovie ===
Year	Title	Role	TV channel
1998	Egois		
1999	Merentas Pelangi		
2000	Kesatria 7		
2003	Garisan Terakhir		
2003	Neon		VCD
2005	Menantu Mak Dara		TV3
2006	Labuna Labuni		Astro Ria
2021	Dolla Watch Me Glow	Herself	Astro Citra

=== Television ===
Year	Title	Role	TV channel	Notes
1998	Roda Impian	Host	Astro Ria	with Halim Othman
