= Hetty Sarlene =

Singaporean singer and actress (born 1984)

- Born: Hetty Sarlene binti Abdul Hamid; 21 April 1984 (age 42); Singapore
- Occupations: Singer, actress
- Musical career
- Genres: Pop
- Instrument: Vocals
- Years active: 1999–present
- Label: New Southern Records

Hetty Sarlene Abdul Hamid (born 21 April 1984) is a Singaporean singer and actress. After performing at two international competitions in 1999, she was signed to New Southern Records. After releasing two albums with them and winning Best Artiste at the 2002 Anugerah Planet Muzik, she focused on acting. She has since appeared in several Malaysian films dan television series.

== Biography ==
Sarlene was born on 21 April 1984 to Abdul Hamid Abdul Rahman, a technician, and his wife Sariah Omar, a manager. She was named after the Indonesian singer Hetty Koes Endang. By age three she was singing "only" Endang's songs and would sing along with the singer when the latter appeared on television. She has a younger sister. She began performing at family events at age five, before entering singing competitions around age twelve or thirteen. She also began singing karaoke regularly.

Sarlene represented Singapore in the 1999 Asia Song Festival, in which she placed fourth, as well as the Asia Bagus competition in Bali, Indonesia, in which she placed fifth. Afterwards, in 2000 Sarlene was booked by New Southern Records; its manager, Iman Wan, had been scouting her for several years but not signed her due to her age. After signing with NSR, she released her debut single, "Rindu Aku Rindu" ("Long, I Long"), which was an instant hit. This success led her to release her self-titled debut album in July of that year, which contained, among other songs, a duet with Anuar Zain entitled "Demi Cinta Kita" ("For Our Love").

Another single, "Sangsi Asmara" ("Doubting Love"), was released in October 2001 as part of the compilation album Sutera 2 (Silk 2). Sarlene's second album, Tiada Lain, was launched on 15 October of that year. It included a song, "Kau Tetap Ku Cinta" ("You're Still the One I Love"), written by Sarlene, as well as a duet with Malaysian singer, Rem entitled "Hampa" ("Alone"). She was reportedly pleased with the results, and followed the release with several months of promotion. However, the album was somewhat unsuccessful. In 2002 Hetty won Best Artiste at Anugerah Planet Muzik and by 2002 had moved to Kuala Lumpur with her mother, who served as her manager.

In 2003, Sarlene made her feature film debut in Iskandar as the lead character's arranged wife; she had taken the role reluctantly in 2002 after being offered an audition by the production company. That same year she starred in a serial adaptation of the 1995 film Sembilu as Zetty, which lasted for five seasons. In 2005 she starred in a feature-length remake of the film, entitled Sembilu 2005; the film was a flop. In 2008 Sarlene appeared in the Malay action film Evolusi KL Drift (KL Drift Evolution).

== Musical style ==
Jad Mahidin, writing for The Malay Mail, described her voice as sweet and silky, saying that it could "surprise listeners with some deep tunes." Meor Shariman, writing for the same publication, said that she "could give Siti Nurhaliza a run for her money". Her first album included ballads with R&B influences. The second had more of a jazz influence.

== Discography ==
=== Studio album ===
- Hetty Sarlene (2000)
- Tiada Lain (2001)

=== Compilation album ===
- The Best of Hetty Sarlene (2005)

== Filmography ==
Year	Title	Role	Notes
2003	Iskandar	Alissa	
2004–2005	Sembilu		Main cast
2005	Sembilu 2005	Salina	
2005–2007	Sembilu Kasih		Main cast
2007	Gerak Khas (Season 9)		Episode: "Terpedaya"
2008	Evolusi KL Drift	Vee	
2009	Gerak Khas (Season 11)	Siti	Episode: "Diburu Along" ("Hunted by the Loan Sharks")
2009–2011	Si Capik	Mira	Main cast
2010	Evolusi KL Drift 2	Vee	
2012	Jalan Kembali: Bohsia 2	Ati	

== Influences ==
Sarlene has cited Malaysian singers Ziana Zain and Liza Hanim as some of her favourite singers, stating that they had also influenced her singing style, while Hetty Koes Endang is her favourite Indonesian singer. She has also cited Whitney Houston and Mariah Carey as artists whom she attempts to draw from in her vocals.
