= V. Nagaraj =

Malaysian film director

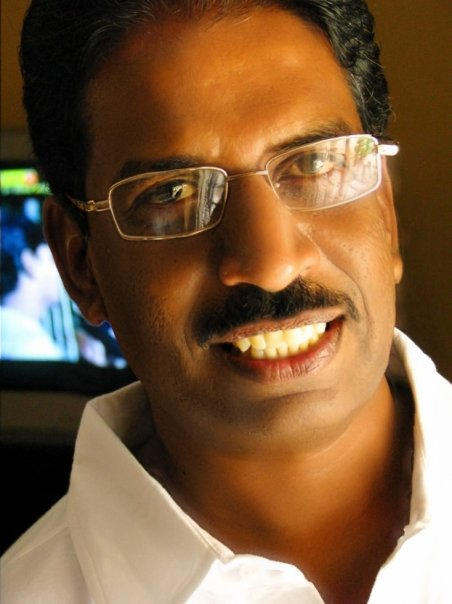
- Born: 20 November 1962 (age 63)
- Occupations: Film director, producer, distributor
- Years active: 1997–present

V. Nagaraj (born 20 November 1962; formerly known as V. N. Raj), is a Malaysian film director.

== Career ==
Nagaraj has worked in the film industry since 1984, and has directed Malay language films such as Ghazal Untuk Rabiah, Getaran, Iskandar and Siapa Tak Sayang Bini.

Nagaraj has also directed digital screening movies such as the horror thriller Tamil film, Aathma. In 2012, he won the Best Director award at the Malaysian Indian Film Festival.

== Filmography ==
=== Director ===
Year	Title	Language	Notes
1997	Ghazal Untuk Rabiah	Malay	
2001	Geteran	Malay	
2003	Iskandar	Malay	
2003	Siapa Tak Sayang Bini	Malay	
2007	Aathma (film)	Tamil	
2008	Ivanthanda Hero	Tamil	
2008	Uruvam	Tamil	
2010	Undercover Rascals	Tamil	
2013	Gila-Gila Remaja 2	Malay	
2021	Mr. Peyii	Tamil	
2022	Undercover Rascals 2	Tamil	

=== Producer ===
Year	Title	Language	Notes
1986	Gila-Gila Remaja	Malay	Executive producer
1987	Keluarga 99	Malay	
1989	Awang Spanar	Malay	
1989	Kembar Siam	Malay	
1990	Sepi Itu Indah	Malay	
1991	Adik (film)	Malay	Also writer
1992	Rimba Malam	Malay	
1994	Simfoni Duniaku	Malay	
1994	Femina (1994 film)	Malay	
2002	Baba	Tamil	Distributor; Malaysia only

=== Television ===
- Note: all television shows are in Tamil.

Year	Title	Channel	Notes
2004	Oru Thayin Kanavu	TV2	
2012	Vazhkai Valvatharke	Astro Vaanavil	
2012	Alaigal	TV2	
2014	Kalai Aranggam	TV2	
2014	Kaaval Season 1	TV2	
2015	Grahanam Season 1	TV2	
2015	Gundhu Ponnae	TV2	
2015	Velicham Season 1	TV2	
2016	Marma Camera Telemovie	Astro Vaanavil	
2016	Velicham Season 2	TV2	
2017	Kaaval Season 2 (Police TV Series)	TV2	
