= Iskandar (film) =

- Promotional poster
- Directed by: V. Nagaraj
- Written by: Shamsul Cairel Abdul Karim
- Starring: Awie; Jeslina Hashim; Hetty Sarlene; Jalaluddin Hassan; Bob Lokman; Radhi Khalid
- Cinematography: Akmal Aki
- Edited by: Elias Maidin
- Music by: Shamsul Cairel Abdul Karim
- Production company: SV Production
- Release date: 27 February 2003
- Running time: 110 minutes
- Country: Malaysia
- Language: Malay

Iskandar is a 2003 Malaysian Malay-language action film directed by V. Nagaraj and starring Awie and Jeslina Hashim.

== Plot ==
Karl Iskandar (Awie), son of Tan Sri Hisham Al-Bakri (Jalaluddin Hassan), returns to Malaysia to take over his father's company. Soon after, the head of another company, Vincent Cheah, is killed; Iskandar discovers that the two companies had a shady business dealings. Meanwhile, Iskandar begins falling in love with Amira (Jeslina Hashim), a waitress at a bar run by the gangster Ringgo (Bob Khairul); this upsets his father, who intends for Iskandar to marry Alissa (Hetty Sarlene), who is of the same social standing.

Iskandar later discovers that his father knew of the dirty dealings and ordered Ringgo to kill Cheah. To silence Hisham, Ringgo plans to kill him but Amira overhears this and when Ringgo knows they also kidnapped Amira. Iskandar was able to save Amira and stop Ringgo before the gangster can kill his father.

== Cast ==
- Awie as Karl Iskandar
- Jeslina Hashim as Amira
- Jalaluddin Hassan as Tan Sri Hisham Al-Bakri
- Bob Lokman as Eddie Gondol
- Radhi Khalid as Sawi
- Aleeza Kassim as Sara Serena
- Bob Khairul as Ringgo
- Farouk Hussain as Man Stereng
- Hetty Sarlene as Alissa
- Ameng Spring as Mail Komando
- Accapan as Bos Disko
- Terry Gallyot as Bud
- Maideen as Pak Man
- Buvanes as Mala

== Production ==
Iskandar was directed by V. Nagaraj, who had previously directed Ghazal untuk Rabiah (Ghazal for Rubiah) and Getaran (Shaking).

Malaysian rock singer Awie was cast in the leading role; he also served as fight coordinator. Malaysia-based Singaporean singer Hetty Sarlene was cast as Alissa, Iskandar's would-be wife; Iskandar marked her feature-film debut. Sarlene, who was forced to audition by her mother, stated that working under Awie was originally frightening, but she was later able to relax. Other cast members included Jalaluddin Hassan, Farouk Hussain, Bob Lokman, Radhi Khalid, Bob Khairul and Aleeza Kasim.

The film featured "Sangsi Asmara" ("Doubting Love"), a single Sarlene released in October 2001.

== Release and reception ==
Iskandar was released on 27 February 2003 the second Malaysian film released in 2003. It was marketed as an action comedy.

Moer Shariman, writing for The Malay Mail, opined that Iskandar was better than Getaran and "all the ingredients of a successful Malay film made 10 years" before, but noted that it lacked focus and ultimately became a "'genre-less' flick". In the New Straits Times, Sharifah Arfah gave the film a scathing review, writing that the film had "nothing but two-dimensional characters, a flimsy plot, patchy editing and nauseating jokes."
