= Rozita Che Wan =

Malaysian actress and model

- روزيتا تشي وان
- Born: Rozita binti Abu Bakar; March 9, 1973 (age 53); Alor Setar, Kedah, Malaysia
- Other name: Che Ta
- Occupations: Actress, host
- Years active: 1993—2004 (as model); 2005—present (as actor)
- Spouses: Azuar Effendy Zulkaply (m. 1995; div. 2003) Zain Saidin (m. 2013)
- Children: 1. Ammar Effendy Azuar Effendy; (son); 2. Aniq Ezra Azuar Effendy (son); 3. Aaisyah Dhia Rana Mohamad Zain (daughter)
- Relatives: Ayu Raudhah (sister), Mohd Zaquan Adha bin Abdul Radzak (brother in Law), Mazlan bin Ahmad @ Lan Pet Pet (brother in Law), Rubihah Abu Bakar (sister)

Rozita binti Abu Bakar (born March 9, 1973), better known by her stage name Rozita Che Wan or Che Ta, is an actress, a former stewardess also former beauty queen who had won Miss Malaysia Intercontinental 1992 and a publisher in Malaysia. She is well known for the comedy series Kiah Pekasam which made her one of the most popular women's comedy actors.

== Court case ==
On December 10, 2024 properties amounting to RM100,000 (US$24,100) was seized by a Malaysian court from her home to settle overdue debt owed to agovernment agency Majlis Amanah Rakyat (MARA) from a loan of nearly RM 1 million in 2017.

On Dec 27, 2024, MARA chairman Datuk Dr Asyraf Wajdi Dusuki said that RM550,000 of the overdue payment was paid, with outstanding balance to be paid by the end of March. As of February 18, 2025 Rozita had paid almost RM690,000 (US$167,000) in cash and through bank transfers. On March 3, 2025 MARA denied claims that she had paid off her debt, and stated that she was still owed MARA over RM440,000 (US$106,000).

== Filmography ==
=== Film ===
Year	Title	Role	Notes
2008	Dunia Baru The Movie	Bride	Film debut
2008	Sepi	Nina	
2009	Sifu & Tongga	Police Officer	
2009	Jangan Tegur	Doctor Lisa	
2010	4 Madu	Ghasidah	
2011	Kembar Siang	Jenab	
2012	Adik Manja Return	Teacher Sofia	
2021	Seandainya Kau Ada	Mak Iskandar	
2022	Operasi UFO		
2023	Mat Kola	Che Som	

=== Television series ===
Year	Title	Role	TV channel	Notes
2006	Sesuci Cinta Soffiya		TV3	
2006—2007	Diari Ramadhan Rafique	Siti Rohani	TV3	
2007	Manjalara	Marissa	TV3	
2007—2008	Jelatang		TV3	
2008	Susuk 2		TV3	
2008—2010	Gerak Khas	ASP Zita	TV2	
2010—2013	Kiah Pekasam	Kiah	Astro Warna	
2011	Iparku Diva		Astro Warna	
2011	Hani		TV3	
2011	Kem "Pink"		TV3	
2011	Kiah Mai Pulak	Kiah	Astro Warna	
2012	Miss Octopus		TV3	
2013	Rumah Kedai		TV3	
2015	Mengejar Wardah		TV1	
2015—2016	Kak Marr	Kak Marr	TV3	
2019	Diari Ramadhan Rafique Reunion	Siti Rohani	TV3	

=== Telemovie ===
Year	Title	Role	TV channel
2005	Cinta Terhalang		
2006	Relung Kasih		
2007	Khafi		TV3
2007	Aku Bukan Buaya		
2008	Wasiat Fitrah		
2010	Masih Ada Harapan		
2011	Pontianak Beraya Di Kampung Batu	Anita/ Pontianak	Astro Ria
2012	Aku Janda Belum Kaya		Astro Prima
2013	Madu		
2013	Kiah Pi Jepun	Kiah	Astro Warna
2017	Oh Speak English Please		Astro Ria

=== Television ===
Year	Program	Role	TV channel	Notes
2012	Ketuk-Ketuk Ramadhan 2012	Herself (Guest)	TV1	
2012—2015	Primadona	Herself with Raja Azura, Ziela Jalil and Erra Fazira (Host)	Astro Prima	
2016—2017	Teh Tarik Che Ta	Herself (Host)	TV1	
2017	The House 3	Herself (Host)	Astro Ria	
2017	Air Tangan Bonda	Herself (Host)	Astro Maya HD	
2017	Seram Selebriti: Episode 4	Herself (Guest)	Astro Maya HD	
2018	Cuit-Cuit Che Ta	Herself (Host)	TV Okey	26 Episodes
