= Baba (2002 film) =

2002 Indian film by Suresh Krissna

- Theatrical release poster
- Directed by: Suresh Krissna
- Screenplay by: Rajinikanth
- Dialogues by: Gopu-Babu; S. Ramakrishnan
- Story by: Rajinikanth
- Produced by: Rajinikanth
- Starring: Rajinikanth; Manisha Koirala
- Cinematography: Chota K. Naidu
- Edited by: V. T. Vijayan
- Music by: A. R. Rahman
- Production company: Lotus International
- Distributed by: Lotus International; Ayngaran International; PVR Pictures; SV VVK Pictures (Malaysia); Lyca Productions (Re-release)
- Release date: 15 August 2002
- Running time: 178 minutes 148 minutes (Re-release)
- Country: India
- Language: Tamil

Baba is a 2002 Indian Tamil-language supernatural action film written and produced by Rajinikanth under his banner Lotus International, directed by Suresh Krissna, with cinematography by Chota K. Naidu. The film features Rajinikanth in the title role alongside Manisha Koirala. The original songs and background score were composed by A. R. Rahman. This is also the second and final Tamil film of Amrish Puri after Thalapathi (1991), which he also collaborated with Rajinikanth.

The film's story is about a carefree young non-believer of supreme power, Baba, who is a reincarnation of a great saint from the Himalayas. After several twists and problems caused by corrupt local politicians, Baba is taken to Mahavatar Babaji, whom Baba was a follower of in his last life. Baba gets tested by the deity to overcome several illusions of the materialistic world and is given seven wishes. How he uses the wishes while developing spirituality and being at loggerheads with the villains at the same time forms the rest of the story.

First released in 2002 with more than 100 days in theatres, the film was met with mixed critical reviews and was a box-office failure, resulting in Rajinikanth reimbursing distributors for their losses. The film was digitally remastered, re-edited with a shorter duration and an alternate ending, and re-released by Lyca Productions on 10 December 2022, twenty years after its original release, coinciding with Rajinikanth's birthday weekend and received a favourable response.

== Plot ==
The film's story is about a carefree young atheist, Baba, who is a reincarnation of a Saint from the Himalayas. After several twists and problems caused by corrupt local politicians, Baba is taken to Mahavatar Babaji, whom Baba was a follower of in his last life. Baba gets tested by the deity and is given seven chances of wishes; the test is that if he uses any one of the wishes for his own personal desires, he would have to take many more births for him to get rid of the Karma.

== Cast ==
- Rajinikanth as Baba
  - Rajinikanth also appears as Mahavatar Babaji in a voice role
- Goundamani as Annamalai
- Manisha Koirala as Chamundeeswari (Voice dubbed by Durga Sundarrajan)
- M. N. Nambiar as Baba's maternal uncle
- Amrish Puri as the tantrik
- Vijayakumar as Chamundeeswari's father
- Delhi Ganesh as Perusu
- MRR. Vasu Vikram as Baba's treacherous friend
- Karunas as Samundi
- Crane Manohar as Kathirika
- Kolkata Viswanathan as Baba's father
- Kitty as Bhai
- Riyaz Khan as Ramaswamy's son
- Bharati Mani as Kanthan
- Ashish Vidhyarthi as Deputy Chief Minister Ippo Ramaswamy (Voice dubbed by P. Ravi Shankar)
- Sayaji Shinde as Divyananda Bharathi
- Bharat Dabholkar as Chief Minister Purushothaman
- Sujatha as Baba's mother
- Sanghavi as Lakshmi
- Seema as Jagadeeshwari, Chamundeeswari's mother (Voice dubbed by Nithya Ravindar)
- Gaiko Mayata as Gaiko
- Deepa Venkat as Chamundeeswari's friend
- Santhoshi as Rajeshwari
- Vaishnavi as Bhuwaneshwari, Chamundeeswari's sister

Special appearances

- Radha Ravi as Minister of Tourism
- Ramya Krishnan as Neelambari
- Nassar as Suryaprakash
- Sarath Babu as the father of the girl saved by Baba

== Production ==
A set of Kalikambal Temple was erected for the film by art director GK. Rajinikanth was first introduced to the temple by film director S. Ramanathan who had told him that Shivaji had visited that temple. Part of the film was shot in Mysore. Due to his friendship with Dr. Rajkumar, Rajinikanth delayed the shooting of the film when the former was kidnapped.

== Soundtrack ==
A. R. Rahman was approached to compose the original songs and background score of the film. He initially declined the offer because of his busy schedule in London, with Bombay Dreams. He eventually accepted the film while in Ajmer. The songs were recorded in June 2002. Rahman had to supervise the recordings online.

The soundtrack album was released in July 2002 in Chennai. According to Rahman, he tried novel innovations with Baba, giving more than the jingoistic music that is a characteristic part of a Rajinikanth film. Some of the songs were filmed in Europe.

Rahman also faced criticism from the film fraternity for not recording the songs on time.

The Dravidar Kazhagam objected to the lyrics of a song that had to be partially deleted from the film later. They objected to what they called unfair commentary on Periyar E. V. Ramasamy and his ideology.

Song	Lyricist	Singers
"Baba Theme" ("Ekam Eva Adhvitheyam")	Vairamuthu	Srinivas
"Dippu Dippu"	Vairamuthu	Shankar Mahadevan
"Kichchu Tha"	Vairamuthu	S. P. Balasubrahmanyam, Reena Bhardwaj, Rajinikanth (voice-over)
"Maya Maya"	Vaali	Karthik, Sujatha Mohan
"Rajyama Illai Emaiyama - Version 1"	Vaali	P. Jayachandran
"Sakthi Kodu"	Vairamuthu	Karthik
"Rajyama Illai Emaiyama - Version 2"	Vaali	P. Jayachandran
"Baba Rap"	Blaaze	Blaaze

== Release ==
This high-budget production was sold at a record price of ₹17 crore to distributors, but the film yielded a share of ₹13 crore worldwide. So, Rajinikanth volunteered to return almost 25% of the investment. In Coimbatore distribution territory, Baba was sold for ₹1.5 crore. This record remained unbroken until Chandramukhi, another Rajnikanth film. The Telugu dubbing rights were acquired by Allu Aravind and the Karnataka distribution rights were sold to Ambareesh. The film was a box office failure.

The film made RM 2 million in Malaysia but only broke even due to the high cost of distributing the movie.

=== Reception ===
Malathi Rangarajan of The Hindu wrote, "You tend to think of Badsha even as you watch Baba and you wonder at the magic of the former, which still remains unsurpassed". A critic from IANS rated the film 2.5/5 stars and wrote, "A large dose of spiritualism, blended with the usual Rajini-style of mannerisms and punch lines, and some graphics [...] A bit of an uncertain and confusing cocktail". A critic from Sify rated the film 3/5 and wrote, "Rajnikanth's much hyped Baba is a total let down even for his die-hard fans! The film lacks mass appeal and looks more like a propaganda movie for the 'Hindutva' brigade".

=== Controversy ===
Ramadoss, a politician from Pattali Makkal Katchi (PMK) condemned Rajinikanth for posing with beedis in the film and playing the role of a chain smoker in the film, which glorified smoking and drinking and encouraged Tamil youth to pick up those habits. PMK volunteers attacked theatres which screened the film Baba and usurped film rolls, and burnt it. Amidst such controversies and negative criticism, Rajinikanth kept himself away from acting. Despite this, a few novice directors approached him with scripts, all of which he rejected.

== Re-release ==
The film was digitally remastered and re-released on December 10, 2022 with its running time being reduced by half-an-hour and having enhanced sound quality.

The film had a limited re-release within Tamil Nadu and a few cities across India. The film received lukewarm reception upon rerelease.

== Legacy ==
The film was noted for its dialogue spoken by Rajinikanth "Katham Katham" (transl. Finish, finish), which gained popularity and also inspired a film of the same name released in 2015. Rajinikanth's hand symbol in the film was dubbed as the "Baba symbol" and consists of the Apana Mudra hand position from yoga. In late 2017, when Rajinikanth announced plans to enter politics, he stated that the Baba symbol would be his party symbol.
