= AC Mizal =

Malaysian singer, comedian, host, actor and radio presenter

Yang Hormat Dato' AC Mizal DIMP
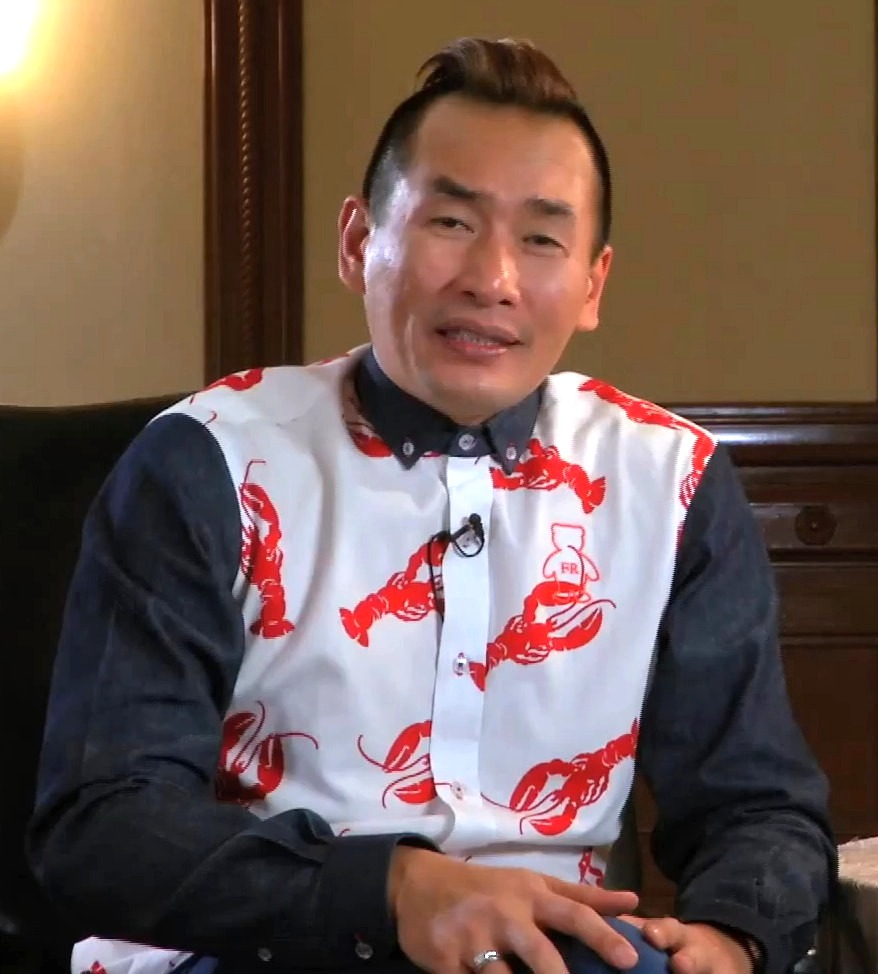
- Mizal during the 2015 Anugerah MeleTOP ERA promotion
- Born: Mizal bin Zaini; 21 December 1971 (age 54); Johor Bahru, Johor, Malaysia
- Occupations: Actor; Singer; Comedian; Host Television; Radio Presenter
- Years active: 1991–present
- Spouses: Shafnie Zainuddin (m. 1995; div. 2001) Datin Emylia Rosnaida (m. 2002)
- Children: 4
- Musical career
- Genres: Pop; hip hop; ballad; nasheed
- Instruments: Vocals

Dato' Mizal bin Zaini, known professionally as AC Mizal (born 21 December 1971), is a Malaysian actor, singer, comedian, TV host and former radio presenter.

== Early life ==
Mizal was born on 21 December 1971 in Johor Bahru, Johor. He is the son of Datuk Zaini Md. Hasim and Datin Madzinah Mansor. He holds an Sijil Pelajaran Malaysia (SPM), and later he pursued his higher education at the Royal Military College of Malaysia.

== Career ==
AC Mizal started his career as a singer, where he was one of the members of a Malaysian hip hop group, 4U2C, which enjoyed musical supremacy between 1992 and 1996 during the rise of Malaysian hip hop music. The group best known for its hit single, "Fiona" which become their signature song. AC has produced three albums with the group. 4U2C disbanded in 1996 and most of its members decided to pursue their studies and concentrated on their respective careers. AC himself later pursued his acting career after the group went their separate ways.

Under the mentorship of Yusof Haslam, his acting career began as a main cast member as CPL Jefri in early incarnation of Roda-Roda Kuala Lumpur, which aired between 1998 and 1999. His breakthrough role came when portraying Inspector Mazlan in the longest-running Malaysian action drama series, Gerak Khas. He was one of the series' seven original casts which include Abby Abadi, ACP Shaharon Anuar, Yusof Haslam, Farid Amirul and Deen Maidin. Mizal then reprised his role in the series' two movie adaptations. He left the series in 2002 after four seasons, for personal reasons and other commitments.

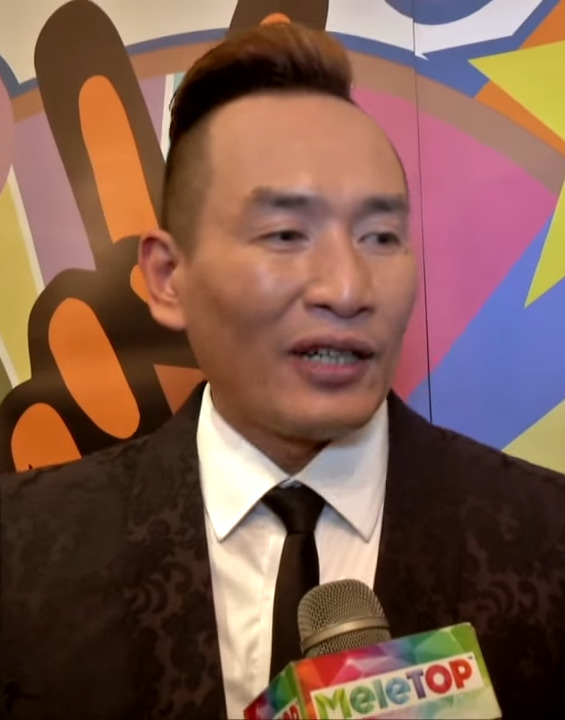
Mizal interviewed by MeleTOP during the launching of Peace Y'all FM.

Prior to Gerak Khas movie adaptations, Mizal made his film debut with 1999 drama film, Bara as Hisham. The following year, he acted in Pasrah where he paired with Erra Fazira. In 2004, Mizal released his solo album, Tassamaqu with "Kali Pertama" featuring Malaysian rapper Reefa, released as singles.

In the same year, he acted in Afdlin Shauki's 2004 comedy film, Buli, where he plays Rudy, a mastermind behind the fictional Allied Asian Bank robbery. He reprised his role on the film's sequel, Buli Balik which was released in 2006. He also acted alongside Afdlin, Hans Isaac and Awie in Baik Punya Cilok (2005).

He is one of few Malaysian artists who contributed a special song titled "Suluhkan Sinar" ("Shine the Light"). Produced by KRU and released in January 2005, the song was specially dedicated to the victims of the 2004 Indian Ocean earthquake and tsunami and it is officiated by the then-Deputy Prime Minister, Najib Razak. Other artists involved in the project were Akademi Fantasia contestants, Erra Fazira, Dayang Nurfaizah, Alleycats, Jaclyn Victor and Anita Sarawak.

In 2006, Mizal went on to become a TV host and helmed the entertainment talk show AC Di Sini aired on Astro Ria. He also appeared with Adlin Aman Ramlie as the Ginger Brothers in two Cicakman film series. The following year, he released his single, "Di Sini". From 2008 to 2009, he became the host of reality talent show, Akademi Fantasia, succeeding Aznil Nawawi. Mizal also judged comedy talent shows such as Raja Lawak, Maharaja Lawak and Maharaja Lawak Mega. He also ventured into theatre in Puteri Gunung Ledang The Musical in 2005 and 2009, and Cuci The Musical in 2009.

He also runs his direct-selling company AC Konsortium Sdn Bhd where he served as the Executive Chairman; the company produces magnet rings and other products. It has been reported that Mizal will make his return in Gerak Khas after a long absence, but it did not materialise. From 2013 to 2015, he served as the host of talk show Sembang Teh Tarik which aired on Astro Warna and in 2016, he hosted the series' revival, Sembang Teh Tarik Kaw.

In 2014, Mizal reformed 4U2C after he went on 18-year hiatus with the group renamed as ForUToC, with all new members. He later released his single, "Paranoid" featuring Indonesian actress, Luna Maya. He started an internet radio station, Peace Yall FM in May 2015 and officiated by singer Siti Nurhaliza, wherein Mizal also served as its President. In 2017, he played a dual role as King Kong and Cobra in highest-grossing box office action comedy film, Abang Long Fadil 2 directed by Syafiq Yusof, also starring Zizan Razak in main role. It was his first movie role in 8 years since Afdlin Shauki's My Spy (2009). He also contributed its soundtrack titled "Senorita" with Syamsul Yusof and Shuib Sepahtu.

In 2018, he hosted Super Spontan Xtravaganza, Arena Panggang season 2 and Maharaja Lawak Mega 2018. The following year, Mizal appeared as Jefri Dom in television series, Pop Yeah Yeah.

== Personal life ==
AC Mizal has been married twice. He married Shafnie Zainuddin on 24 June 1995, and they had two sons, Muhammad Shafiq Iman and Muhammad Shabale Iman. The couple divorced on 17 October 2001. On 10 October 2002, he married former model and actress Emylia Rosnaida, with whom he has two children, a son, Muhammad Reeve Damien, and a daughter, Fea Eryssa.

His father, Zaini Md. Hashim, who was a Muar Police Chief, died on 29 March 2014.

== Discography ==
=== Studio albums ===
Title	Album details
Tassamaqu	Released: July 2004; Label: Best Line Entertainment; Format: CD, cassette, digital download

=== Singles ===
Year	Title	Notes
2001	"Keliru"	OST Gerak Khas The Movie
2007	"Di Sini"	
2012	"Apo Kono Eh Jang"	with Rafidah Ibrahim & Stella Band
2013	"Al-Haq ..... One"	with Mawi
2014	"Paranoid"	with Luna Maya
2017	"Senorita"	with Syamsul Yusof & Shuib Sepahtu
2017	"Itu Saja"	
2021	"Mine"	with Reeve Damien
2026	"Mari Menari Raya"	with Jessie Chung

== Filmography ==
=== Film ===
Year	Title	Role	Notes
1999	Bara	Hisham	Debut film appearance
2000	Pasrah	Zamri	
2001	Gerak Khas The Movie	Inspector Mazlan	
2002	Gerak Khas The Movie II	Inspector Mazlan	
2004	Makar	Aiman	
2004	Buli	Rudy	
2005	Baik Punya Cilok	Wak	
2006	Buli Balik	Ruby	
2006	Cicak Man	Ginger 2	
2007	Diva	Rudy	
2007	Zombi Kampung Pisang	Mat Karan	
2008	Cuci	Tan	
2008	Apa Kata Hati?	Bomoh	
2008	Los dan Faun	Jefri	
2008	Cicakman 2: Planet Hitam	Ginger Ghost 2	
2009	My Spy	AJ	
2017	Abang Long Fadil 2	King Kong / Cobra	
2022	Nasi Lemak 1.0	Sultan Melaka	
2022	Abang Long Fadil 3	King Cobra / King Kali Kong	
2022	Zaara	Zaara	
2023	Sumpahan Syaitan	Malik	

=== Television series ===
Year	Title	Role	TV channel	Notes
1998–1999	Roda-Roda Kuala Lumpur	Cpl Jefri	TV1	
1999–2002	Gerak Khas	Inspector Mazlan	TV1	
2007	Dakkolin Dakkosin	Dakkosin	Astro Prima	
2018	Misteri Jenazah (Season 1)	Askar Jepun	Astro Prima	Episode: "Pada Zaman Dahulu"
2019	Pop Yeah Yeah	Jefri Dom	TV3	
2021–2022	Gerak Khas Undercover (Season 1)	Mazlan	TV3	

=== Telemovie ===
Year	Title	Role	TV channel
2003	Meraung		VCD
2003	Neon	Karim	VCD
2006	Kantoi		Astro Ria
2019	Saya Jual Ye Bang	Datuk Jaki	Astro First Exclusive
2022	Megastar Academy		Astro Ceria

=== Television ===
Year	Title	Role	TV channel
2006–2009	AC Di Sini	Host	Astro Ria
2008	Akademi Fantasia (season 6)	Host	Astro Ria
2009	Akademi Fantasia (season 7)	Host	Astro Ria
2011	Maharaja Lawak	Host	Astro Warna
2011–2021	Maharaja Lawak Mega	Host	Astro Warna
2011–2012	RM 1,000,000 Money Drop	Host	Astro Ria
2013	Raja Lawak Astro (season 7)	Permanent judges	Astro Warna
2013–2015	Sembang Teh Tarik	Host	Astro Warna
2013–2015	Anugerah Lawak Warna	Host	Astro Warna
2014	Havocwarna	Host	Astro Warna
2014	Terbaik Toqq	Host	Astro Warna
2015–2016	Dalang Prank	Host	Astro Warna
2015	Super Spontan All Star 2015	Host	Astro Warna
2016	Kaunter Kebaboom!	Host	Astro Ria
2016	AF 2016	Permanent judges	Astro Ria
2016	Sembang Teh Tarik Kaw	Host	Astro Warna
2016	Super Spontan Superstar 2016	Host	Astro Warna
2016–2017	Duo Star	Host	Astro Ria
2016–2017	Lawak Solo	Permanent judges	Astro Warna
2017	Super Spontan Superstar 2017	Host	Astro Warna
2017	Konsert Komedi	Himself – Week 5 (Baik Punya Cilok)	Astro Warna
2017	Debat Lebat	Guest	Astro Prima
2018	Super Spontan Xtravanganza	Host	Astro Warna
2019	Di Balik Tawa (season 2)	Himself	Astro Warna
2019	Arena Panggang Warna Live	Host	Astro Warna
2019	I Can See Your Voice Malaysia (season 2) Episode 9	Guest	TV3
2019	Anugerah Bintang Popular Berita Harian ke-32	Host with Elly Mazlein	TV3
2020	Dansa Dan Sing	Guest	Astro Ria
2020	Punchline DAC	Host	Astro Warna
2020	Gegar Vaganza (Season 7)	Guest	Astro Ria
2020	Vokal Mania	Host with Azira Shafinaz	TV3
2020	Anugerah Bintang Popular Berita Harian ke-33	Host with Nabila Huda	TV3
2020–2024	The Masked Singer Malaysia	Host	Astro Warna
2021	All Together Now Malaysia (Season 1)	Captain jury	Astro Ria
2024	Muzikal Lawak Superstar (Season 4)	Host	Astro Warna

== Honours ==
=== Honour of Malaysia ===
- Pahang
  - Knight Companion of the Order of the Crown of Pahang (DIMP) – Dato' (2010)

He was awarded Darjah Indera Mahkota Pahang (DIMP) which carries the title of Dato' by Sultan Ahmad Shah, the late Sultan of Pahang at the end of 2010.
