= RM 1,000,000 Money Drop =

- Genre: Game show
- Developed by: Endemol
- Presented by: AC Mizal
- Country of origin: Malaysia
- Original language: Malay
- No. of episodes: 3 Episodes to date

Production
- Running time: 60–90 minutes (inc. adverts)
- Production companies: Remarkable Television, Endemol UK

Original release
- Network: Astro Ria
- Release: 3 December 2011

RM 1,000,000 Money Drop is the Malaysian version of The Money Drop and is broadcast on Astro Ria. The show began on 3 December 2011 at 10pm, the show later changed to 9pm on 14 January 2012 due to the finished airing and finale of MasterChef Malaysia. The host of the show is AC Mizal.

== Format ==
A team of two people with a pre-existing relationship is presented with RM 1,000,000 in denominations of RM 50 in bundles of RM 20,000 (50 bundles = RM 1,000,000). The team must risk the entire amount on each correctly of eight multiple-choice questions.

For each question, the contestants choose one of two categories, then indicate which answer(s) they wish to risk their money on by moving the bundles of cash onto a row of trap doors, termed "drops," each of which corresponds to one answer. However, they must always keep at least one drop "clear" with no money on it. In addition, all eight questions have a time limit; any money that is not placed on an answer when time runs out will be lost.

Once the money is in place, the trap doors for the incorrect answers are opened, and the cash on them falls out of sight and is lost. The contestants then continue the game using the cash they had placed on the correct answer. They get to keep whatever money is left after the eighth question; if they lose everything before reaching this point, the game ends immediately and they leave with nothing.

== Question and timing ==
Every question have two category, the pair of contestant must choose one only, and every question have timing for answer, The timing is 60 Seconds.

| Number of Question | Time for Answers | Multiple Choice |
|---|---|---|
| 1 to 4 | 60 Seconds | 4 |
| 5 to 7 | 60 Seconds | 3 |
| 8 | 60 Seconds | 2 |

== Play Along ==
Viewers in the Malaysia can also participate in the Play Along segment every Saturday and Sunday at 9PM. The game is played online at the official website.
