= Dynas Mokhtar =

Malaysian actress

- ديناس مختار
- Born: Wan Intan Edrinas binti Wan Mokhtar; 8 March 1983 (age 43); Selangor, Malaysia
- Other name: Dynas Mokhtar
- Education: Universiti Teknologi MARA
- Occupations: Model, actress, television host, fashion designer
- Years active: 2002–present
- Spouses: Mohd Hafizi Mohamed (m. 2008; div. 2014) Dato' Mohamad Shazrik Che Mohd Din (m. 2018)
- Children: 4
- Awards: Anugerah Bintang Popular Berita Harian – Pelakon TV Wanita Paling Popular (2007, 2008, 2009), EH ! Magazine – Anugerah Susuk Tubuh Terbaik (2008), SHOUT ! Awards – Most Stylish Award (2009)
- Website: dnabydynas.com

Wan Intan Edrinas binti Wan Mokhtar (born 8 March 1983), better known as Dynas Mokhtar, is a Malaysian model, actress, television host, and fashion designer based in Kuala Lumpur.

== Early life ==
Dynas is the middle child in a family of three children. Her father is an engineer and her mother is a businesswoman. She is an Assunta Alumna, having attended both Assunta Primary School and Assunta Secondary School in Petaling Jaya.

== Career ==
In 2004, at age 21, Dynas made the FHM's 100 Sexiest Women list, boosting her career and making her an A-list actress and supermodel in Malaysia and Indonesia.

=== Modelling ===
Her modelling career took off when, at age seventeen, she was offered modelling positions in television and print commercials. She began her career as a catwalk model with various modelling agencies and was also featured in advertisements for KFC, Celcom, Dunhill, Pepsi, Knorr, Nestlé and HSBC Malaysia.

=== TV hosting ===
She ventured into TV hosting on Astro's Beat TV with Bront Palarae. She also hosted TV3's Si Kecil Ku Chak! in 2010, a programme for young mothers and mothers-to-be.

=== Acting ===
Dynas starred in the television series Dibawah Ketiak Isteri alongside Kencana Dewi, Leez AF5, Radhi Khalid, Bob Ahmal, Zizan, Harun Salim Bachik, et al. The series' second season ran on Astro Prima. She also starred in season three of Astro Ria's Awan Dania, and played a wicked hag in the smash hit, supernatural-themed series, Susuk for two seasons. In 2007, she landed a role in Gerak Khas, a long-running police drama series which has been broadcast on TV1 since 1999.

After gaining television exposure, Dynas began acting in films, starring in Haru Biru, Cinta Kolesterol, I Know What You Did Last Raya, Impak Maksima, and dramas such as Janji Diana and Cinta Kau & Aku.

=== Brand ambassador ===
Dynas has also been a brand ambassador and spokesperson for various health and beauty products such as Safi Balqis, a halal skin care product (2008), Kunzense, a slimming, beauty and wellness company (2011),Qutie Coat, a whitening cream mask that improves complexion (2012) and Pet Pet, a global baby products brand (2013).

=== Fashion design ===
In 2009, in partnership with Awal Ashaari, they opened a fashion boutique known as DnA CelebrityStyle in Desa Sri Hartamas. This business was subsequently closed and the partners ventured out on their own. Dynas launched DNA By Dynas in 2011, a new collection consisting of maternity and breastfeeding wear. She designs most of her collections alongside a team of seamstresses and wholesale manufacturers. She officially launched her first boutique, Dynas Nursing Attire at The Curve, Mutiara Damansara in 2012.

== Personal life ==
Dynas married Mohd Hafizy Hafiz on 15 March 2008. The couple has two children, a daughter Khyra Khalyssa (born 24 April 2010) and a son Mohamed Haqaish (born 15 June 2012). Her first pregnancy, in 2009, ended in premature stillbirth due to pulmonary hypoplasia. The couple divorced in early 2014, after a string of denials.

=== Controversies ===
In October 2005, while shooting for a local drama Siti Aishah, Dynas and several crew members were arrested on suspicion of drug possession during a raid at a house in Kota Bharu, Kelantan. She was released on bail and subsequently tried at the Kota Bharu Magistrates Court. The charge against her was later dropped after one of the crew members pleaded guilty to the drug possession charge.

== Filmography ==
=== Film ===
Year	Title	Role	Notes
2003	Cinta Kolestrol	Fatin	
2004	I Know What You Did Last Raya		
2005	Cinta Fotokopi		
2006	Main-Main Cinta	Maya	
2007	Haru Biru		
2007	Impak Maksima	Maria	
2007	Kayangan	Erina	
2008	Dunia Baru The Movie	Inspector Police	
2008	Apa Kata Hati?	Linda	
2012	Bisikan Syaitan		
2017	Bukan Cinta Malaikat		
2017	Tombiruo: Penunggu Rimba	Baizura	
2018	Badang		Cameo
2018	3: AM	Daughter	
2019	Bella & Jamie	Mastura	
2019	Rise to Power: KLGU	May Wong / Madam Wong	

=== Television series ===
Year	Title	Role	TV channel	Notes
2005	Siti Aishah	Siti Aishah		
2007	Muli		GMA Network	
2007	Janji Diana The Series		TV2	
2007	Susuk	Cindai	TV3	
2007	Kaizer		TV3	
2007–2009	A D'Beijing		TV3	
2007–2009	Gerak Khas	Inspector Julia	TV2	
2008	Di Bawah Ketiak Isteri (Season 1)		Astro Prima	
2008	Ezora	Leeya	TV3	
2009	Julia Juli		TV3	
2009	Awan Dania		Astro Ria	
2011	You Saka... Pergi Jauh-Jauh	Zeti	TV3	
2011	Khurafat The Series	Anna	Astro Ria	
2013	Demi Dia	Wanda	TV3	
2015	3 Campur 2	Dina	Astro Ceria	
2015	Silir Kasih		TV2	
2017	Cik Serba Tahu	Kak Chaq	Astro Ria	
2017	Syurga Yang Kedua	Delaila	Astro Prima	
2018	Inai Yang Hilang	Noraini	NTV7	
2018	KL Gangster: Underworld	Madam Wong	Iflix	6 episodes
2020	Chandelier	Zatty	Astro Ria	
2020	Korban Kasih	Norizah	TV1	
2020	KL Gangster: Underworld 2	Madam Wong	WeTV	
2020–2021	Hadiah Dari Tuhan	Khatty	TV3	
2021	Kisah Cinta Rumi	Hafiza	TV3	
2021	Keluarga Untuk Disewa	Intan / Marissa	TV9	
2021	Cik Ayu Mee Sanggul	Farhana	Astro Ria	Special appearance
2021	Helo, Jangan Tapau Cintaku	Puan Arisa	TV3	
2021	Perisik Cinta Tak Diundang	Khaty Janda	TV3	
2022	Harith Fayyadh	Arisa	TV3	
2022	Ada Apa Dengan Saka	Tiara	TV9	
2023	Special Force: Anarchy	Mariam	Disney+ Hotstar	

=== Telemovie ===
Year	Title	Role	TV channel
2018	Suatukala	Kesuma	Astro First Exclusive
2021	Mache Fusion	Kak June	Awesome TV
2022	Raudhah Autisme	Nadia	TV Okey

=== Television ===
Year	Title	Role	TV channel
2002–2005	Beat TV	Herself (Host)	Astro Ria
2004	Sepetang Bersama	Herself (Host)	TV1
2006	Sulaman Kasih		NTV7
2007	Thumb TV	Herself	NTV7
2010	Si Kecil Ku Chark!	Herself (Host)	TV3
2014	Sebelum Terlambat	Herself (Host)	Astro Prima
2018	Romantika	Herself	Astro Ria

== Awards and nominations ==
Anugerah Skrin

- Pelakon Baru Anugerah Skrin Pantene (2007) (nominated)
- Pelakon Pembantu Filem Terbaik (2008) (nominated)

Festival Filem Malaysia

- Pelakon Pembantu Filem Terbaik (2008) (nominated)

Anugerah Bintang Popular Berita Harian

- Pelakon TV Wanita Paling Popular (2007, 2008, 2009)

EH! Magazine

- Anugerah Susuk Tubuh Terbaik (2008)

SHOUT! Awards

- Most Stylish Award (2009)
