= Dunia Baru The Movie =

- Directed by: M. Hitler Zami
- Written by: Wan Hasliza Wan Zainuddin
- Based on: Dunia Baru by M. Hitler Zami
- Produced by: Ahmad Puad Onah
- Starring: Elyana; Pierre Andre; Almy Nadia; Iqram Dinzly; Baizura Kahar; Anne Ngasri; Ellyas Abdullah
- Production company: Grand Brilliance
- Release date: February 7, 2008 (Malaysia)
- Running time: 90 minutes
- Country: Malaysia
- Language: Malay
- Budget: MYR 0.80 million
- Box office: MYR 2.296 million

Dunia Baru The Movie (English: The New World The Movie) is a 2008 Malaysian Malay-language adventure comedy film based on the comedy drama series Dunia Baru, directed by M. Hitler Zami. It was released on 7 February 2008.

== Synopsis ==
The film begins when Opie (Elyana) gets a surprise through a letter written by Anizah (Anita Baharom) expressing her desire to go to Thailand and marry Fazley (Mohd Hafiz). According to the contents of the letter, Anizah was so determined that she was willing to give up the offer to continue her studies in the UK. This upsets his close friends Opie, Madihah (Anne Ngasri), Suzanna (Almy Nadia), Adif (Pierre Andre) and Tajol (Wan Elyas). They conspire to chase Anizah and change her mind.

While on the highway, there were three people namely Citrawana who poured oil on the road causing Tajul and his gang to back the car. Tajul and his gang sent his car to the workshop.

== Cast ==
- Elyana as Opie - A tomboy girl, and has her own best friends, Erika and Suzana
- Anita Baharom as Anizah - A girl who wants to go to study in the UK, but has been kidnapped by her own boyfriend, Fazley
- Ellyas Abdullah as Tajul
- Pierre Andre as Adif - A brave man, has a lover named Erika
- Baizura Kahar as Erika
- Anne Ngasri as Madihah
- Iqram Dinzly as Darius -A strong jealous person, willing to leave Madihah to save the gangs to find Anizah, but Darius turned good when he saw Adif and Opie singing
- Almy Nadia as Suzana
- Mohd Hafiz as Fazley - A most cruel person who wants to marry Anizah to Thailand, seize Anizah's diary, kidnap Anizah, and two workers, namely Anak Seekers and Mujeed, but were finally arrested by the police after Adif managed to seize back Anizah's diary from him
- Md Yeakub Jalil as Mujeed - A Bangladeshi boy who works as an oil filler, but when Fazley kidnaps Mujeed after Anizah Mujeed wants to report to the police
- Kenchana Dewi Suppiah as a Volunteer
- Illya Cecupak as Citrawana Gang 1
- Opie Zami as Citrawana Gang 2
- Ropie Cecupak as Citrawana Gang 3
- Ridzuan Hashim as Police ASP
- Dynas Mokhtar as Police Inspector
- Khatijah Tan as Puan Mariah
- Zami Ismail as the Groom - A man who is about to marry his own wife, but he invites Opie to sing
- Rozita Che Wan as the Bride
- Mamat Khalid as Head of Oil Station
- Q. Amin Shahab as Tok Imam
- Ahmad Busu as Mat Deris
- Ahmad Fedtri Yahya as Journalist Behind the Night
- Ryzal Jaafar as Yusuf
- Ungku Ismail Aziz as Hassan
- Norzazleen Zulkafli as Sariah
- Syed Bolkiah as Doctor
- Ramli Mohamad as an Elder
- Robin Coenraad as Father Mat Salleh
- Susan Louise Tennent as Mak Mat Salleh
- Mirsad Hassan Kulasic as Mat Salleh's Boy
- Herris Helmi as Mazdul 786
- Siti Syuhairin Saifuddin as a Ghost
- Zarynn Min as Nurse

== Trivia ==
- The script for this film had to be revised 10 times due to several things.
