= Roda-Roda Kuala Lumpur =

Malaysian police TV series

- Genre: Police procedural; drama; action; crime fiction
- Created by: Yusof Haslam
- Developed by: Skop Productions; Royal Malaysia Police
- Directed by: Nor Iskandar; Faizal Yusof; Musa Mohammed
- Opening theme: "Roda-Roda Kuala Lumpur" by AC Mizal (1998-1999) and James Baum (2008-2013)
- Ending theme: "Roda-Roda Kuala Lumpur" by AC Mizal (1998-1999) and James Baum (2008-2013)
- Country of origin: Malaysia
- Original language: Malay
- No. of seasons: 6
- No. of episodes: 186

Production
- Executive producers: Fetty Hj. Ismail; Salmah Hj. Ismail
- Producer: Yusof Haslam
- Editors: Shahrul Dhoman; Murad Man; Wan Norhadi Wan Noh
- Running time: 43 minutes
- Production company: Skop Productions

Original release
- Network: TV2
- Release: 5 October 1998 – 23 September 2013

Related
- Gerak Khas (since 1999); Metro Skuad (2012–2013)

Roda-Roda Kuala Lumpur (also known as Roda-Roda KL, lit. "Wheels of Kuala Lumpur") is a Malaysian police procedural television drama series produced by Skop Productions with original ideas and concepts by Yusof Haslam. First aired in 1998 on RTM, the original cast members are A. Galak, AC Mizal, Shaharon Anuar and Deen Maidin. The first reincarnation of the series was premiered on October 5, 1998 to March 29, 1999, and discontinued when Gerak Khas was first aired. The second reincarnation was revived in 2008 and aired until 2013.

Unlike Gerak Khas, a somewhat similar police procedural drama series, Roda-Roda Kuala Lumpur focuses on the noble efforts of Royal Malaysia Police's traffic policemen in carrying out their daily duties and highlights the frequent traffic crime cases such as illegal racing, dangerous driving and traffic light violations.

== Cast ==
=== First run (1998-1999) ===
- A. Galak
- AC Mizal
- Deen Maidin
- Shaharon Anuar
- Rima Rashidi

=== Second run (2008-2013) ===
- Zack Kool
- Lando Zawawi
- Serina Redzuawan
- Jalaluddin Hassan
- Fauziah Latiff
- Roy Azman (Note: He once appear as a guest cast in the original 1998 series.)
- Z. Zamri
- Hanny Harmi
- Memey Suhaiza
- Farid Amirul
- Nash Lefthanded
- Aishah Atan
- Syafiq Yusof

== See also ==
- Gerak Khas (TV series) (1999–2011; 2014–present)
- Metro Skuad (2012–2013)
