= Gerak Khas (TV series) =

Malaysian action drama television series

- Title card used in season 19
- Genre: Police procedural; True crime; Action drama; Family drama; Mystery; Crime thriller
- Created by: Yusof Haslam
- Developed by: Skop Productions; Royal Malaysia Police
- Directed by: Yusof Haslam; C. Kumaresan; Syamsul Yusof; Syafiq Yusof; Faizal Yusof; Majed Saleh; Rashid Sibir; Yusof Kelana; Aziz M. Osman
- Starring: See below
- Theme music composer: PH Lim; James Baum; Hafiz Hamidun
- Opening theme: "Gerak Khas"
- Ending theme: "Gerak Khas"
- Composer: PH Lim
- Country of origin: Malaysia
- Original language: Malay (Note: There are also some episodes in the series with English, Mandarin, Tamil, Indonesian and Thai dialogues occasionally.)
- No. of seasons: 20
- No. of episodes: 1,054

Production
- Executive producers: Fetty Ismail; Salmah Ismail; Syamin Yusof; Syafiq Yusof
- Producer: Yusof Haslam
- Production locations: Kuala Lumpur, Malaysia; Klang Valley, Malaysia; Perak, Malaysia; Malacca, Malaysia; Sabah, Malaysia; Penang, Malaysia; Terengganu, Malaysia; Sarawak, Malaysia; Labuan, Malaysia; Jakarta, Indonesia; Bangkok, Thailand; London, England; Seoul, South Korea
- Editors: Shahrul Dhoman; Murad Man; Wan Norhadi Wan Noh
- Running time: 43–44 minutes
- Production company: Skop Productions

Original release
- Network: TV1 (1999–2003; 2005–2006); TV2 (2004–2005; 2006–2020)
- Release: 5 April 1999 – 7 February 2020
- Network: TV3
- Release: 4 December 2020 – 27 March 2021
- Network: TVS
- Release: 3 July 2026 – present

Related
- Roda-Roda Kuala Lumpur (1998, 2008−13); Metro Skuad (2012–13); Gerak Khas Undercover (2021)

Gerak Khas (transl. Special Forces) is a Malaysian police procedural television drama series broadcast on TV1, TV2, TV3 and TVS. The series follows the crime-fighting efforts of the Royal Malaysia Police (RMP), led by SAC Datuk Helmi (Yusof Haslam), from murders to terrorism and many other crimes committed in Malaysia. Gerak Khas ran from April 5, 1999 until March 27, 2021, spanning 20 seasons and 1054 episodes, making it the longest-running primetime drama series on Malaysian television.

== Series overview ==
Gerak Khas centers on murders, bank robberies, loan sharks, terrorists, kidnappings, drug trafficking, money laundering and other crimes committed in Malaysia, where the RMP are called to handle the cases. Though some of the series' episodes are fictitious, there are also episodes based on true stories.

Datuk Yusof Haslam directed both the series and its film adaptations, which are produced by his company, Skop Productions. Gerak Khas underwent major changes to its cast members, with the exceptions of Yusof, AC Mizal, A. Galak, Farid Amirul, Deen Maidin, Shaharon Anuar and Abby Abadi, who were the original cast members. The series received recognition from The Malaysia Book of Records as the country's longest running television drama series.

The series went on hiatus in 2011 after the 13th season finished airing that year. Metro Skuad, a similar true crime series (also produced by Yusof), was created as a replacement to Gerak Khas and ran for two seasons, airing from 2012 to 2013. Gerak Khas was subsequently revived in 2014, and its 14th season (the first season in three years) began airing on 14 February.

In 2018, it was reported that AC Mizal would reprise his role as Mazlan after he left the series in 2002, but he declined, telling Yusof he will "let his previous involvement become nostalgic". Reruns of the 11th and 15th seasons were broadcast on TV2 from December 2019 until January 2021.

Due to the worldwide COVID-19 pandemic and the Malaysian movement control order, Gerak Khas was suspended from airing in February 2020, resulting in the cessation of its production. It was replaced by reruns of the 19th season, before filming resumed in late June 2020.

Yusof Haslam announced in an interview with Berita Harian that Gerak Khas will end production after its 20th and final season. It began airing on TV3 on December 4, 2020, under the title Gerak Khas The Finale. After the series' conclusion, a spin-off series, Gerak Khas Undercover began airing on TV3, starting October 1, 2021.

In October 2025, four years after Gerak Khas ended, Yusof announced that the series will return on air in 2026 with its premiere date yet to be announced. Sarawak-based TV channel, TVS acquired the broadcasting rights and entering the licensing agreement for the series. He said that the new Gerak Khas will retained some old cast with the addition of new cast members, including from Sarawak. The series premiered on TVS starting 3 July 2026.

== Cast and characters ==
Actors featured in Gerak Khas (not including the movies) include:

=== Final line-up ===
- Datuk Yusof Haslam as SAC Datuk Helmi (1999–2011, 2014–2021)
- Deen Maidin as S.M. Lingam (1999–2011, 2014–2021)
- Farid Amirul as Sub Inspector Lim (1999–2011, 2019–2021)
- Shaharon Anuar as SAC Saiful (1999–2001, 2019–2021)
- Abby Abadi as DSP Aleza (1999–2011, 2019–2021)
- Norman Hakim as ACP Haris (2003–2009, 2014, 2017–2021)
- Z. Zambri as Sergeant Zaidi (2003–2011, 2014–2021)
- C. Kumaresan as DSP Kumar (2004–2011, 2014–2021)
- Salina Saibi as ASP Salina (2007 as guest star, 2008–2011 as regular cast, 2014–2021)
- Sheera Iskandar as Inspector Sheera (2007 as guest star, 2008–2011 as regular cast, 2016 also as guest star, 2017–2021)
- Erra Fazira as ASP Jeslina (2018–2021)
- Ungku Ismail Aziz as Inspector Daniel (2020–2021)
- Izzat Mushtaq as Inspector Izzat (2020–2021)

=== Former cast ===
- AC Mizal as Inspector Mazlan (1999–2002)
- Zulkifli Ismail as Supt. Razlan (2001–2011)
- A. Galak as Sub Inspector Hashim (retired, now working as a taxi driver) (1999–2011, 2014–2021)
- Elly Mazlein as Detective Mazlein (2002–2005)
- Haliza Misbun as Inspector Jeslina (2003)
- Angeline Tan as Chief Inspector Geena (2004–2011)
- Dynas Mokhtar as Inspector Julia (2006–2009)
- Shah Iskandar as Inspector Hisyam (2009 as guest star; 2010–2011 as regular cast)
- Rozita Che Wan as DSP Zita (2009–2010)
- Hanny Harmi as Detective Linda/Hani (2008, 2014–2015)
- Nur Huda Ali as Detective Amy (2010–2011)
- Rebecca Nur Islam as Detective Salina (2005)
- Avaa Vanja as Detective Sofia (2006)
- Afiq Muiz as ASP Rosli (2014–2015)
- Nizen Ayob as Inspector Nizam (2014–2017)^{1}
- Syamsul Yusof as Superintendent Jefri (2006–2009 as guest star, 2015-2018 as regular cast)
- Tisha Shamsir as Inspector Tisha (2014–2017)
- Mas Khan as Detective Kamal (2014–2017)
- Mimifly as Inspector Adira (2015)
- Raja Ilya as Inspector Shakila (2015–2018)
- Nancie Foo as ACP Suzy (2015)
- Fattah Amin as Inspector Haikal (2016–2017)
- Ken Abdullah as Detective Ken (2016)
- Azar Azmi as Detective Amira (2017)
- Hisyam Hamid as Inspector Aiman (2018)
- Ruzzlan Abdullah Shah as Detective Wong (2018)^{1}
- Zul Ariffin as Inspector Ashraf (2009–2011, 2019)
- Mustaqim Bahadon as Detective Mustafa (2019)

=== Guests ===
From 1999 to 2011 and from 2014 to 2021, Gerak Khas features some of well-known Malaysian actors as a guest cast in each episode. There are also some guest casts who appeared in more than one episode.

Notes: All guest casts were listed in alphabetical order.

- Adam Corrie
- Acong Sweetchild
- Azad Jasmin
- Alex Yanz
- Aida Khalida
- Aprena Manrose
- Adam Shahz
- Amyza Adnan
- Azlan Komeng
- Aman Graseka
- Aziz M. Osman
- Ahmad Fauzee
- Aishah Atan
- Abu Bakar Juah
- Abu Bakar Ariffin
- Amai Kamarudin
- Amran Tompel
- Along Eyzendy
- Abon
- Aman Shah
- Accapan
- A. R. Badul
- Anne Abdullah
- Ana Dahlia
- Ani Maiyuni
- Ammar Alfian
- Adam John
- Badrul Muhayat
- Baggio Damasutra
- Boy Iman
- Bella Nazari
- Balkisyh Semundur Khan
- Danny X-Factor
- Cat Farish
- Chomel Fana
- Connie Ahmad
- Diana Johor
- Dazrin Kamarudin
- Den Wahab
- Delimawati
- Emma Akma
- Eira Syazira
- Effa Nareesha
- Esma Daniel
- Elya Miera
- Elizabeth Tan
- Fathil Dani
- Fauzi Nawawi
- Faezah Elai
- Fauziah Nawi
- Faizal Hussein
- Fazren Rafi
- Fetty Dzul
- Fad Anuar
- Hetty Sarlene
- Hafidzuddin Fazil
- Izreen Azminda
- Ifa Raziah
- Imuda
- Ika Nabila
- Ira Ghani
- Izuan Razali
- Jalaluddin Hassan
- Joe Radzwill
- Jesse Lim
- Janet Khoo
- Julie Dahlan
- Josiah Hogan
- Jeff Hassan
- Kenji Sawahi
- Kathy Azean
- Kismah Johar
- Khairil Anwar Aman
- Kismah Johar
- Ku Faridah
- Khir Mohd Noor
- Khir Rahman
- Kapten Mohd Nor Bond
- Laila Nasir
- Latif Ibrahim
- Liza Abdullah
- Lando Zawawi
- Linda Helmi
- Lisdawati
- Lia Natalia
- Marissa Yasmin
- Mubarak Majid
- Maimon Mutalib
- Majed Saleh
- Mawi
- Mustapha Kamal
- Mat Over
- Noraini Hashim
- Nabila Huda
- Nasrizal Ngasri
- Nadzmi Adhwa
- Nor Albaniah
- Nasir Bilal Khan
- Nadia Kesuma
- Nash
- Ozlynn Waty
- Oktovia Manrose
- Pablo Amirul
- P. Jeganathan
- Qazem Nor
- Riezman Khuzaimi
- Rizal Ashreff
- Raja Azrey
- Roslee Sako
- Roy Azman
- Radhi Khalid
- Rahim Razali
- Rashdan Baba
- Ridzuan Hashim
- Rose Iskandar
- Rozita Rohaizad
- Ruzaidi Abdul Rahman
- Ruzzlan Abdullah Shah
- Rahim Jailani
- Razib Salimin
- Raja Ema
- Rashidah Jaafar
- Riz Amin
- Ramli Salleh
- Syafiq Yusof
- Shaheizy Sam
- Syanie
- Sheikh Haikel
- Shiha Zikir
- Sabrina Ali
- Sasqia Dahuri
- Sherry Ibrahim
- Siti Elizad
- Soffi Jikan
- Tam Suhaimi
- Shaharuddin Thamby
- TS Jeffrey
- Usop Wilcha
- Wan Raja
- Wanna Ali
- Yasmin Khanif
- Yank Kassim
- Zack Taipan
- Zamarul Hisham
- Zarina Zainuddin
- Zaidi Omar
- Ziema Din
- Zila Bakarin
- Zakaria Yusof
- Zachery Francis
- Zarina Zainoordin
- Zarina Anjoulie
- Zulkifli Zain
- Zazly Baginda
- Zalfie Mohamad Nor
- Zack Kool
- Zed Zaidi

Notes
^{1} deceased.

== Film adaptation ==
There are three films based on the series:

- Gerak Khas The Movie (2001)
- Gerak Khas the Movie II (2002)
- GK3 The Movie (2005)

The first movie, released in early 2001, topped the Malaysian box office. In the first film, they faced crime bosses Castelo (Rosyam Nor) and Rafayel (Norman Hakim), whom Abadi married in 2002; he returned to the franchise playing Chief Inspector Haris.

In the storyline, Aleeza was jealous of Mazlan's relationship with Inspektor Shafikah (Erra Fazira). However, in the sequel, Mazlan was jealous of Aleeza and new member Inspektor Zamri (Azri Iskandar), was suspected of being corrupt.

== Awards ==
- 2009: Longest Running Drama Series by The Malaysia Book of Records
- 2009: Anugerah Skrin 2009 for Best Drama (nominated)
- 2019: Anugerah MeleTOP Era 2019 for Drama MeleTOP

== Spin off ==
8 months after Gerak Khas aired its last season, a spin off series entitled Gerak Khas Undercover began airing on 1 October 2021. It stars Aaron Aziz, Elizabeth Tan, Ruzana Ibrahim, Eizlan Yusof, original Gerak Khas actor AC Mizal and Gerak Khas The Movie actor Rosyam Nor, alongside others featured in Gerak Khas the Finale.

== See also ==
- Television series similar to Gerak Khas:
  - Ang Probinsyano – Philippine police procedural drama series
  - Sanggang-Dikit FR – Philippine police procedural comedy-drama series
  - C.I.D. – Indian police procedural drama series
  - Tatort – German police procedural drama series
  - CSI: Crime Scene Investigation – American police procedural drama series
  - Cold Squad – Canadian police procedural drama series
