= Zarynn Min =

Malaysian actress (born 1980)

- Born: Noraszarinawati binti Tumin; 7 December 1980 (age 45); Gombak, Selangor, Malaysia
- Other name: Zarynn
- Occupation: Actress

Noraszarinawati binti Tumin (born 7 December 1980), known professionally as Zarynn Min is a Malaysian actress.

== Early career ==
Min graduated in Broadcasting from Akademi TV3 and Business Studies from Stamford College. Her first TV appearance was in Rafflesia as Hidayah for RTM (awarded Best TV Series, Anugerah Skrin 2006). Since then, she has acted in numerous TV series and tele-movies including Salam Terakhir, alongside Malaysian award-winning and popular actor, Dato’ Rosyam Nor. She debuted in Anak Mami: The Movie, followed by Dunia Baru: The Movie, Jin and Suamiku Mr. Perfect 10.

In 2010, Min appeared as a leading actress in Aalia (68 episodes for Astro Prima) as well as her first psychological thriller telefilm Gila.

== Nominations ==
- In 2011 she was nominated Best Actress In A Leading Role by the 16th Asian Television Awards for her performance in Gila.
- In 2015, she was nominated for Best Supporting Actress in Anugerah Tribute P.Ramlee for her performance in Menunggu Hujan Teduh
- In 2016 she was nominated for the same category for her performance in Aku Dan Dia.
- She received her first awards at ANUGERAH TELENOVELA 2018 for BEST SUPPORTING ACTRESS IN TELENOVELA held in Plenary Hall KLCC.
