= Fauziah Latiff =

Malaysian singer and actress (born 1970)

Fauziah Latiff فوزية لطيف
- Born: Siti Fauziah Sheikh Abdul Latiff; 5 December 1970 (age 54); Teluk Intan, Perak, Malaysia
- Genres: Pop, dance-pop
- Occupation(s): Singer, songwriter, actress
- Instrument: Voice
- Years active: 1988–present
- Labels: Happy Records; EMI; Universal Music Malaysia; Maheswara Musik Records (Indonesia); Musica Studios (distributor in Indonesia)

Siti Fauziah Sheikh Abdul Latiff, better known as Fauziah Latiff, is a Malaysian singer and actress. One of Latiff's first public performance was at a charity concert at Stadium Merdeka in 1987. Talent scouts from Happy Records spotted her and offered her her first recording contract. She is referred to as "Jee" by her fans.

Fauziah Latiff started making public performances for charity concerts at Stadium Merdeka in 1987. Her talent was spotted by a talent scout from recording company Happy Records and she was offered her first recording contract.

In 2004, she became one of the professional judges on 8TV's reality TV show Malaysian Idol alongside Roslan Aziz and Paul Moss for two consecutive seasons.

== Discography ==
Fauziah Latiff has released more than seventeen albums. Her first single was Digamit Memori.

- Digamit Memori (1988)
- Kau Merubah Segalanya (1989)
- Kini (1990)
- Tiada Noktah Cinta (1991)
- Gubahan Rindu Puisi Syahdu (1992)
- Epilog Memori Gelita (1993)
- Apa Sebenarnya (1994)
- Petikan Syahdu Fauziah Latiff (1995)
- Sahabat (1995)
- Petikan Syahdu Fauziah Latiff Vol. II (1996)
- Fauziah Latiff Dia (1997)
- Jee '98 (1998)
- Fauziah Latiff No. 1 (1999)
- Yang Lebih Kau Cinta... Jee (2001)
- Di Sebalik (compilation – 2004)
- Pesona (2006) with collaborated Jim Brickman
- Keunggulan (2010)

Fauziah Latiff has also released the following singles and soundtracks;

- Ku di Sini, which was the soundtrack to a drama series, Gelora Di Hati Sara 2 (2010)
- Takdir Cinta, which was the soundtrack to a drama series, Seindah Takdir Cinta (2016)
- Tanpa Noktah, which was a duet with Roy Sta Maria (2021)
- Suka-suka, which was a duet with Roy Sta Maria (2021) and both is soundtrack for drama Kerana Dia Aku Suka 2022

Unfortunately, these singles are not available for streaming on popular platforms such as Spotify. They are only available on YouTube.

=== Vocal Profile ===
- Voice Type: Full Lyric Soprano
- High Notes: Gubahan Rindu Puisi Syahdu (F5). In falsetto, she relies on D6.
- Low Notes: Yang Lebih Kau Cinta (C4)
- Vocal Range: 2.2 octave (C4-D6)

== Malaysian Idol judge ==
Fauziah is one of the three judges of Malaysian Idol, a series of reality singing competition.

== Acting career ==
Drama

- Lontong as Sabariah (1995)
- Gelora Di Hati Sara Season 1-2, as Sara (2008/2010)
- Roda-Roda Kuala Lumpur Season 7 (finale), as Inspector Fauziah (2013)
- Tahyul as Qaseh Syuhada (2021)
- Kalung as Hasnah (2020)

Theatre

- Muzikal Tun Abdul Razak as Rahah Noah (2009)
- Rubiah as Rubiah (2000)

Telemovie

- Kudrat Iman as Mahani (2008)
- Ke Pintu Bahagia as Raudhah (2013)
- Korban Penunggu Hospital as Kesuma (2017)
- Kerana ku Mencintai mu as Maryam (2019)
- Jangan Malu Menangis as Haryati (2022)

Program TV Show

- Malaysian Idol Season 1-2, 2004/2005 as judge
- Akademi Fantasia Season 5 as Judge
- Sepahtu Reunion Live, Season 2017 & 2019 as guest
- Mikrofon Impian Season 1-2,2019/2021 as judge
- Immortal Song Malaysia,2020 as judge
- I Can See Your Voice Malaysia,2021 as guest
- Masak Itu Senang as host, 2021
- Keringat Selebriti Season 2,2021 as guest
- Roda Panas 2,2022 as guest (rider)

Films

- Pak Tam Duda (1988) as herself cameo
- Nadia (1992) as herself cameo
- Mahathir The Journey (2022 or 2023) as Tun Dr Siti Hasmah
