= Gerak Khas the Movie =

2001 film by Yusof Haslam

Gerak Khas The Movie
- Directed by: Yusof Haslam
- Screenplay by: Yusof Haslam; Shaharon Anuar; Ambri Kailani; A. Galak; Yusof Kelana
- Based on: Gerak Khas by Yusof Haslam
- Produced by: Yusof Haslam
- Starring: AC Mizal; Abby Abadi; Erra Fazira; Rosyam Nor; Nasha Aziz; Norman Hakim
- Cinematography: Omar Ismail; Omar Man
- Edited by: Salehan Shamsuddin
- Production company: Skop Productions
- Release date: March 1, 2001
- Running time: 123 minutes
- Country: Malaysia
- Language: Malay
- Budget: MYR 1.35 million
- Box office: MYR 4.40 million

Gerak Khas the Movie is a 2001 Malaysian Malay-language police procedural action thriller film written, directed and produced by Yusof Haslam, based on the Malaysian television series, Gerak Khas. The film was released on 1 March 2001 and starring Yusof himself, AC Mizal, Abby Abadi, Erra Fazira, Rosyam Nor, Norman Hakim and Nasha Aziz. The movie was a commercial success and spawned two more sequels—Gerak Khas The Movie II (2002) and GK3 the Movie (2005).

== Plot ==
Two police Inspectors—Mazlan (AC Mizal) and Aleeza (Abby Abadi) helmed the Gerak Khas unit, which was set up to crippled major crime syndicates dealing in pirated porn VCDs and ecstasy pills. Both rival syndicates are headed by Castello (Rosyam Nor) and Rafayel (Norman Hakim). Things getting complicated by the arrival of new police officer, Inspector Shafikah (Erra Fazira) and a TV journalist, Azura (Normala Samsudin) who worked at the TVKL.

== Cast ==
- AC Mizal as Inspector Mazlan
- Abby Abadi as Inspector Aleeza
- Erra Fazira as Inspector Shafikah
- Normala Samsudin as Azura
- Rosyam Nor as Castello
- Norman Hakim as Rafayel
- Nasha Aziz as Suzana
- Lan Pet Pet as Salleh
- Yusof Haslam as DSP Helmi
- Shaharon Anuar as ASP Saiful
- A. Galak as Sergeant Hashim
- Farid Amirul as Detective Lim
- Deen Maidin as Detective Lingam
- Zul Yahya as Roy
- Yank Kassim as Thug I
- Capt. Mohd Nor Bon as Thug II
- Kamil Khan as Thug III
- Illa Sabry as a band singer (uncredited)

== Production ==
Principal photography of the film began circa September and October 2000. The filming cost is approximately priced RM1.3 million. Malaysian singer, Illa Sabry made an uncredited cameo appearance in the film as a band singer.

=== Music ===
The soundtrack album for Gerak Khas the Movie was released on February 6, 2001 by Nova Music. "Keranamu Kekasih" performed by Illa Sabry and "Keliru" by AC Mizal was the lead singles for the soundtrack.

== Sequels ==
A second sequel, Gerak Khas the Movie II was released in 2002, directly after the success of the first film, later followed by the third and last sequel, GK3 the Movie (also known as Gerak Khas the Movie III) was released in 2005.

== Awards and nominations ==
Year	Award	Category	Nominated work(s)	Result
2001	15th Malaysian Film Festival	Best Comedy Actor	Mazlan Pet Pet	Won
2001	15th Malaysian Film Festival	Best Male Supporting Actor	Rosyam Nor	Nominated
2001	15th Malaysian Film Festival	Best Sound Editing	Peter Lim	Won
2001	15th Malaysian Film Festival	Best Editing	Salehan Shamsuddin	Nominated

== Soundtrack ==
- Gerak Khas - AC Mizal ft Abby Abadi (Main theme)
- Keranamu Kekasih - Illa Sabry
- Keliru - AC Mizal
- Queen of the Night - Whitney Houston
- Helicopter Pursuit & a few another music score - soundtrack of End of Days

== See also ==
- Gerak Khas (TV series)
