= Hetty Koes Endang =

Indonesian kroncong singer

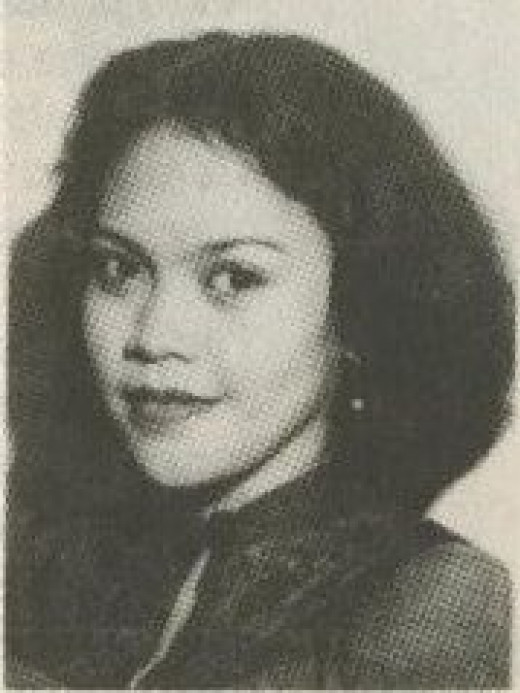
- Born: Hetty Koes Madewy; August 6, 1957 (age 69); Tasikmalaya, West Java, Indonesia
- Occupations: Singer; Celebrity
- Height: 157 cm (5 ft 2 in)

Hajjah Hetty Koes Endang (born 6 August 1957) is an Indonesian keroncong singer. Her 1977 duet with Ajie Bandi, "Damai Tapi Gersang" ("Peaceful Yet Arid"), was the first Indonesian song to win the World Popular Song Festival in Tokyo. The song was selected by Rolling Stone Indonesia in 2009 as one of the best Indonesian songs of all time.

== Biography ==
=== Early life and success ===
Endang was born on 6 August 1957 to Raden Endang Umar, a soldier, and R.S. Koerniwulan, a housewife. She made her musical debut in 1974.

In 1976, Endang and Ajie Bandi performed "Damai Tapi Gersang" ("Peaceful Yet Arid") at the seventh Indonesian Popular Song Festival, in which they placed second. They later won the World Popular Song Festival, held that year at Budokan Hall in Tokyo, Japan, with the song; they were the first Indonesian act to win the festival. Also in 1977 she won the Indonesian Popular Song Festival with Titiek Puspa's "Cinta Putih" ("White Love").

In February 1981, Endang was charged with defamation for telling the press that her birth father was dead (meninggal dunia in Indonesian although can be shortened to "meninggal"), when he was in fact alive; Endang stated that she intended the statement to mean that her father had abandoned all of his responsibilities after divorcing her mother in 1971.

(abandoned all of his responsibilities after divorcing her mother can be translated as "meninggal kan tanggungjawapnya lepas menceraikan ibunya in Indonesian, the word for "abandoned" might be translated to "membiarkan", "meninggalkan" or "usang" depending on the context, Hetty may used the translation of "meninggalkan" while talking to the press but the press might misinterpreted it as "meninggal"(dead) instead, thus creating the misinformation)

In April she was found not guilty of all charges, which could have brought her three months in jail and six of probation. Later that year Endang won Best Performance at the 1981 Indonesian Popular Song Festival together with her childhood friend Euis Darliah. The pair sang a rock-influenced version of Titik Hamzah's "Siksa" ("Torture"). They then went on to sing at the World Popular Song Festival in Tokyo, which they lost. The following year, she and her family opened Hedick's, a company which worked in import-export; she also opened a fried chicken restaurant in Karet, Central Jakarta.

With the orchestra led by Addie MS, Endang won third place at the 1983 edition of the Viña del Mar International Song Festival in Chile with Titik Hamzah's song "Sayang" ("Dear"); Endang herself was chosen as best singer. In 1984, Endang performed a duet, "Sayang" ("Dear"; written by Eros Djarot and Jockie Soerjoprajogo) with Chrisye on his album Nona; she also provided backing vocals for "Gadis Manja" ("Spoiled Girl"). At first Chrisye was unsure of the duet, as his and Endang's vocal styles were quite different. However, the album was successful. In 1986 she won a BASF Award for Berdiri Bulu Roma-ku (My Spine is Tingling), which sold over a million copies in Indonesia.

=== Later career ===
Endang married politician Yusuf Emir Faishal in July 1991, after two months of courtship. Afterwards she performed internationally, in Kuala Lumpur, Malaysia, and Tokyo. The couple lived in Johor Bahru for five years. In 1996 they went on the hajj to Mecca.

During the New Order, Endang campaigned several times for reigning president Suharto's Golkar party. However, after the fall of Suharto in 1998, she became involved with the National Awakening Party (Partai Kebangkitan Bangsa), with her husband, as she had long been part of the sponsor, the Islamic organisation Nahdlatul Ulama. She later recalled that her work with Golkar had been done under external pressure.

In 1999, Endang released Alunan Emas 25 Tahun Kegemilangan (Golden Songs from 25 Years of Joy), a compilation album in celebration of the 25th anniversary of her entry into music. Two years later she became managing director of a start-up news portal website, Indonesiakini.com.

As of December 2011, Hetty is semi-retired, currently actively performs multiples off air and focuses in performing for charity events. Other than that, she actively contributes in singing competition in multiple events in Indonesia and Malaysia.

== Influences ==
Endang was influenced by the vocal stylings of Etta James, Lynn Anderson, Tammy Wynette, and Olivia Newton-John. She further influenced other Indonesian and Malaysian singers, including Siti Nurhaliza.

== Music ==
Endang sings keroncong, a kind of traditional Indonesian music typified with slow, melancholic melodies and heavy use of string instruments. She has a high, shrill voice. In an interview with The Malay Mail she said that her works are most successful in Japan and the Netherlands.

== Legacy ==
Endang's duet with Ajie Bandi "Damai Tapi Gersang" was selected as the 53rd best Indonesian song of all time by Rolling Stone Indonesia. Singaporean singer Hetty Sarlene is named after her and reportedly began singing Endang's songs by age three.

== Personal life ==
Endang is married to Yusuf Emir Faishal. The couple have three children.

== Bibliography ==
Footnotes

References

- "150 Lagu Indonesia Terbaik Sepanjang Masa" [150 Best Indonesian Songs of All Time]. Rolling Stone Indonesia (in Indonesian) (56). Jakarta: a&e Media: 65. December 2009. Archived from the original on 16 March 2012.
- Ahmad, Azman (13 August 2002). "Evergreen Diva". The Malay Mail – via HighBeam Research.; (subscription required)
- "Akhirnya Ketemu Jodoh" [Finally Meets her Soulmate]. Tempo (in Indonesian). 6 July 1991. Archived from the original on 4 March 2016.
- "Bebas dari Tuduhan" [Free of Charges]. Tempo (in Indonesian). 4 April 1981. Archived from the original on 4 March 2016.
- "Darah Hetty Koes Endang" [Blood of Hetty Koes Endang]. Tempo (in Indonesian). 15 December 1998. Archived from the original on 4 March 2016.
- "Duet dengan Hetty" [Duet with Hetty]. Tempo (in Indonesian). 26 September 1981. Archived from the original on 3 March 2016.
- Endah, Alberthiene (2007). Chrisye: Sebuah Memoar Musikal [Chrisye: A Musical Memoir] (in Indonesian). Jakarta: Gramedia Pustaka Utama. ISBN 978-979-22-2606-5.
- "Ex-Lawmaker Gets 4.5 Years for Graft". Jakarta Globe. 6 April 2009.
- Ghani, Marina Abdul (17 February 1999). "Passable effort by Hetty". The Malay Mail – via HighBeam Research.; (subscription required)
- Hadi, Eddino Abdul (9 December 2011). "The Trills of Indonesia's Keroncong Are Going to Singapore". Straits Times Indonesia.
- "Hetty Koes Endang". Tempo (in Indonesian). 15 May 2000. Archived from the original on 29 July 2017.
- Mahidin, Jad (22 December 2000). "Hetty on her own". The Malay Mail – via HighBeam Research.; (subscription required)
- "Hetty Tetap di Atas" [Hetty Still at the Top]. Tempo (in Indonesian). 16 July 1977. Archived from the original on 4 March 2016.
- Maulia, Erwida (15 July 2008). "Graft body names PKB lawmaker a suspect". The Jakarta Post. Archived from the original on 23 August 2008.
- "Mempunyai Ayah Baru" [Has a New Father]. Tempo (in Indonesian). 14 November 1981. Archived from the original on 4 March 2016.
- "Merayakan Ulang Tahun" [Celebrating a Birthday]. Tempo (in Indonesian). 29 August 1981. Archived from the original on 3 March 2016.
- Nona (Media notes). Chrisye. Musica Studios. 1984.
- "Orkestra Pop yang Ketiban Rugi" [Pop Orchestra Going Broke]. Tempo (in Indonesian). 13 March 1993. Archived from the original on 29 July 2017.
- "Pengaduan Ayah Kandung" [A Birth Father's Complaint]. Tempo (in Indonesian). 28 February 1981. Archived from the original on 4 March 2016.
- "Terjun ke Dunia Bisnis" [Going into Business]. Tempo (in Indonesian). 18 September 1982. Archived from the original on 3 March 2016.
