= Athulya Ravi =

Indian actress (born 1992)

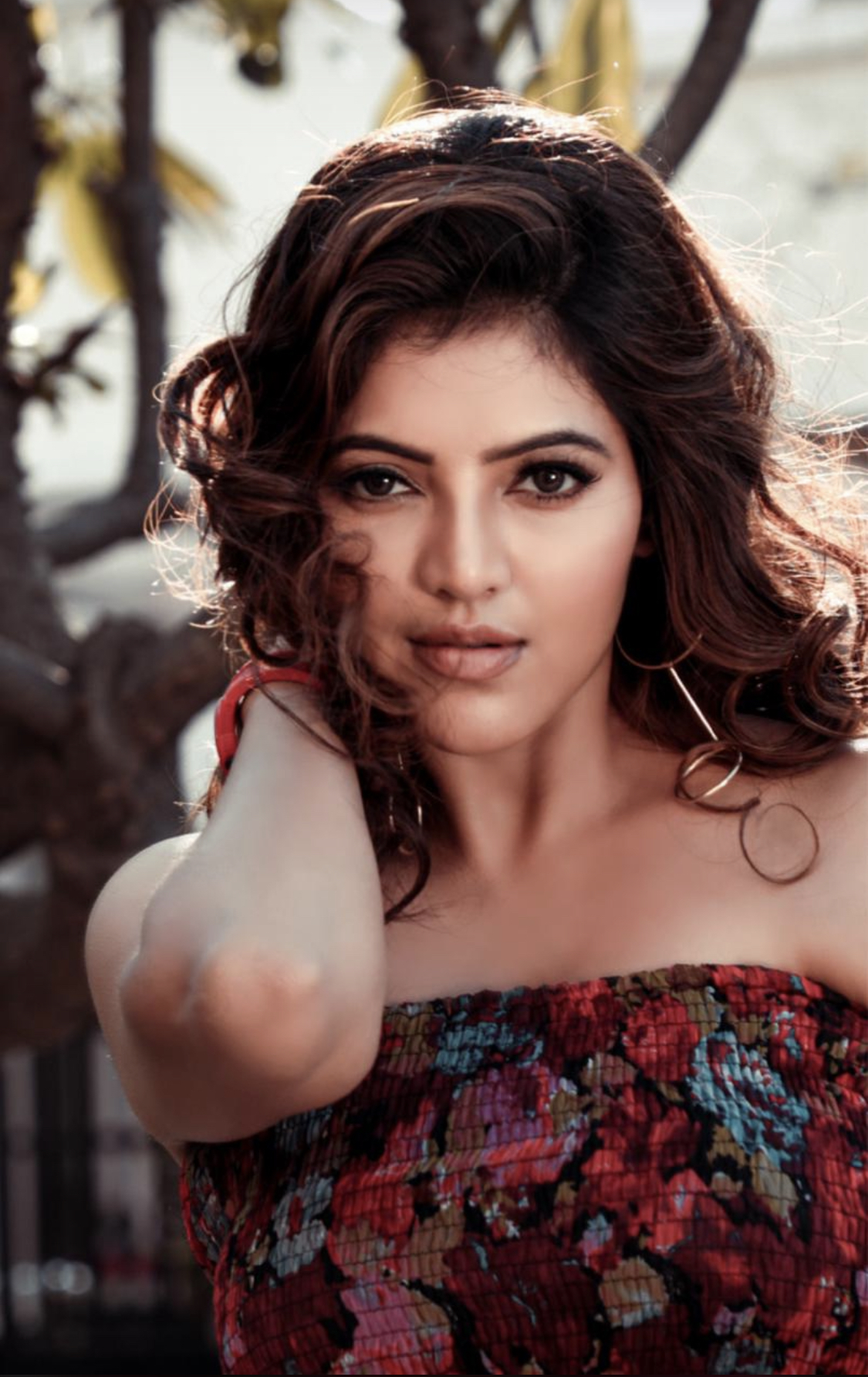
- Athulya in 2023
- Born: Divya Ravi; 21 December 1992 (age 33); Coimbatore, Tamil Nadu
- Occupation: Actress
- Years active: 2017–present

Athulya Ravi (born 21 December 1992) is an Indian actress who has predominantly works in Tamil and Telugu films. She made her debut with the film Kadhal Kan Kattudhe in 2017 and went on to appear in films including Yemaali (2018) and Naadodigal 2 (2019).

== Early life and career ==
Athulya was born as Divya in a Tamil speaking family. She was born and brought up in Coimbatore. She did her schooling at Thondamuthur Girls Higher secondary school in Coimbatore, Tamil Nadu. Athulya studied Information Technology at Hindusthan College of Arts & Science, Coimbatore, Tamil Nadu. She then attended SRM Institute of Science and Technology (SRMIST), Chennai, Tamil Nadu and went on to study at Sri Krishna College of Engineering and Technology, Coimbatore, Tamil Nadu.

Athulya started her acting career through the short film "Palvaadi Kadhal". She had a leading role in Kadhal Kan Kattudhe (2017).

In 2018, she starred in V. Z. Durai's Yemaali. Portraying a character knows as "Ri" (Ritu), Athulya described that the character was a modern and independent girl, who is exactly opposite to what she was in real life. She played Aari's mute sister in Nagesh Thiraiyarangam (2018). In 2019, she had roles such as Suttu Pidikka Utharavu and Capmaari. In 2020, Athulya Ravi has two films Naadodigal 2 and Yen Peyar Anandhan. In 2021, she was seen in the adult comedy Murungakkai Chips. In 2022, she is joining hands with Jai in Yenni Thuniga after who shared screen space with the actor in Capmaari. In 2023, the action comedy film Meter marks the Telugu debut of Athulya Ravi.

== Filmography ==
- All films are in Tamil, otherwise noted

†	Denotes films that have not yet been released

Year	Film	Role(s)	Notes	Ref.
2017	Kadhal Kan Kattudhe	Athulya		
2017	Katha Nayagan	Kanmani's friend		
2018	Yemaali	Ritu		
2018	Nagesh Thiraiyarangam	Lakshmi		
2018	Inba Twinkle Lilly	Reporter		
2019	Kee	Diya's friend		
2019	Suttu Pidikka Utharavu	Bhuvana		
2019	Adutha Saattai	Pothum Ponnu		
2019	Capmaari	Varsha		
2020	Naadodigal 2	Soumya		
2020	Yen Peyar Anandhan	Savithri		
2021	Murungakkai Chips	Vijaya Shanthi		
2022	Vattam	Kokilavani		
2022	Yenni Thuniga	Narmadha		
2022	Cadaver	Angel		
2023	Meter	Arjun’s love-interest	Telugu film	
2025	Chennai City Gangsters	Jenny		
2025	Diesel	Malar		
2026	Mr. X	Aditi Surya Pratap / Vedha Narayanan		
