= Yemaali =

2018 film by V. Z. Durai

- Theatrical release poster
- Directed by: V. Z. Durai
- Written by: V. Z. Durai
- Dialogue by: Jeyamohan
- Produced by: M. Latha
- Starring: Samuthirakani; Sam Jones; Athulya Ravi; Roshni Prakash
- Cinematography: M. Rethish Kanna; I. J. Prakash
- Edited by: R. Sudharsan
- Music by: Sam D. Raj
- Production company: Latha Productions
- Release date: 2 February 2018
- Country: India
- Language: Tamil

Yemaali (Tamil pronunciation: [eːmaːli] transl. Naïve) (Note: Also a portmanteau of the letter "A" from Aravind, and the name Maali.) is a 2018 Indian Tamil-language film written and directed by V. Z. Durai. The film stars Samuthirakani, Sam Jones, Athulya Ravi, and Roshni Prakash. Produced by Latha Productions and featuring music composed by Sam D. Raj, it began production in April 2017 and was released on 2 February 2018.

== Plot ==
After being dumped by his girlfriend Ritu, Maali enlists the help of his friend Aravind to get revenge on her.

== Cast ==
- Samuthirakani as Aravind/Pandiyan
- Sam Jones as Maali
- Athulya Ravi as Ritu/Ri2
- Roshni Prakash as Divya
- Bala Saravanan as Rathakrishnan
- Singampuli as Selvaraj
- Janani Ashok Kumar as Maari

== Production ==
The film was announced in March 2017, with director V. Z. Durai confirming that his next film would feature Samuthirakani in the leading role. Durai revealed that Samuthirakani would be playing the full-fledged lead role for the first time, and would be seen in four different looks. B. Jeyamohan was signed to write dialogues, while two cinematographers Rethish and Prakash and debut music composer Sam D were also selected for the project. Newcomer Sam Jones and actress Athulya Ravi, who starred in Kadhal Kan Kattudhe (2017), were selected to play other pivotal roles in the film, which began production in early April 2017. It was prominently shot in Chennai.

A teaser trailer for the film was released in November 2017, with scenes depicting Athulya undressing and smoking a cigarette being featured. In an unexpected turn of events, Athulya apologised to her fan following for the scenes and stated that the scenes would not be featured in the film. Portraying a character knows as Ritu, Athulya described that the character was a modern and independent girl, who is exactly opposite to what she was in real life. For the role, Athulya trained to walk and talk like the character, coloured her hair and lost weight to look the part.

== Soundtrack ==
The music was composed by Sam D. Raj. The soundtrack album was released on 15 December 2017 through TrendMusic.

Track listing
No.	Title	Lyrics	Singer(s)	Length
1.	"Ineemelum Nee Illai"	Mohan Rajan	Velu	4:34
2.	"No No"	V. Z. Durai	V. Z. Durai, Cliffy	4:13
3.	"Ekkachekka Kushiyo"	Mohan Rajan	Cliffy, Hemambika, Velu	3:46
4.	"Nai Nai Boyfriend"	V. Z. Durai	Nincy	4:07
5.	"Niavae Illa Vaanam"	Arun Bharathi	Velu, V. Z. Durai	4:00
Total length:				20:40

== Release and reception ==
The film was released on 2 February 2018. The Times of India wrote, "The idea is good on paper, but falls flat in execution. The scenes that are imagination and the real sequences are, at times, shown simultaneously, which kind of creates confusion and fails to hold our attention". Kirubhakar Purushothaman of India Today wrote, "The film tries exceptionally hard to portray the modern youth and their romance, but what pans out on the screen is a chichi endeavour", criticising the shaming of the LGBTQ community, sexist jokes, and "cringe-worthy" double entendres. Gopinath Rajendran of The New Indian Express criticised the writing, the majority of cast performances and their lip synching, concluding, "On the whole, Yemaali is a tedious watch with not even a single aspect to salvage it". Cinema Vikatan said the film had an interesting one-liner but criticised other aspects such as the shaming of homosexual people, cinematography and music. Dinamalar gave a negative review, criticising the technical aspects and saying the film looked like a television show.
