= Azhaggiye Thee =

2019 Malaysian Tamil-language drama film

- Directed by: Logan
- Starring: Saresh D7; Latha; Guna
- Music by: Jey Raggaveindra
- Production company: ATMovies Sdn Bhd
- Release date: 27 June 2019 (Malaysia)
- Running time: 1 hour 40 minutes
- Country: Malaysia
- Language: Tamil

Azhaggiye Thee (Tamil: அழகிய தீ) is a 2019 Malaysian Tamil-language drama film. It tells the true story of a young lady from rural estate who moves to Kuala Lumpur in hopes of better living, but has to go through financial hard times and family problems. It is released on 27 June 2019 in Malaysia.

== Synopsis ==
Ananthi (Latha), is a 20-year-old girl living in the estates of Slim River, Perak. She is the youngest of three siblings and the family is poor. When she was born, her brother, Selvam despised her who thinks she was misfortune to her family. After suffering tragic loss of her parents due to car accident while searching for a groom for Ananthi for, she moves to Kuala Lumpur in hopes for a better living. She received support and makes new friends, including Bala (Saresh D7) and just when things starts to turn good, financial and family problems soon arises.

== Cast ==
- Saresh D7 as Bala
- Latha as Ananthi
- Guna
- Kokila
- Yuvaraj Krishnasamy
- Ruban

== Soundtrack ==
The music was composed by Jey Raggaveindra and written by Arul and features two songs "Uruguthu Oru Manam" and "Yaaro Ival Yaaro".

== Release and reception ==
The film was released in 27 theatres and faced competition from the Indian Tamil films Sindhubaadh and Dharmaprabhu.

A reporter from Malaysia Gazette felt that the film is "a must-see film for all levels of society to see for themselves how this human trafficking syndicate for drug crimes operates". A critic from Rollo De Pelicula wrote that "The narrative of the story is presented in a simple, unpretentious way but manages to give a good enough impact on your emotions when you see the suffering that Ananthi's character goes through".
