= 6 (film) =

2013 Indian film by V. Z. Durai

- Promotional poster
- Directed by: V. Z. Durai
- Written by: Jeyamohan (dialogues)
- Story by: V. Z. Durai
- Produced by: Abinesh Elangovan
- Starring: Shaam; Poonam Kaur
- Cinematography: Krishna Samy
- Edited by: N. Arunkumar
- Music by: Srikanth Deva
- Production companies: Abi & Abi Pictures
- Distributed by: Studio 9
- Release date: 20 September 2013
- Running time: 129 minutes
- Country: India
- Language: Tamil

6 (also known as 6 Melugu Varthigal or 6 Candles) is a 2013 Tamil crime thriller film written and directed by V. Z. Durai. It stars Shaam and Poonam Kaur. The lead character sports six looks and goes around six states to solve a mystery. The film was released on 20 September 2013 with positive reviews and became a sleeper hit. The movie is loosely based on the 2007 Korean movie Voice of a Murderer.

== Plot ==
Ram is a young software engineer who lives with his wife Lizzy and their son Gautham, in Chennai. They lead a normal life until Gautam's sixth birthday, when they lose Gautham at a crowded beach. The police are not very helpful as Gautham is not the child of anyone with influence. However, after much pestering, the local inspector has one of his men take Ram and Lizzy to the slums in north Chennai to meet a petty criminal, Nayanar, who knows about all the crimes done by the dwellers in his area. Initially, he pretends not to know anything. However, after Lizzy begs at his feet, he finally reveals that Gautham might have been taken to Nagari in neighboring Andhra Pradesh to be sold to a local pimp, Krishna Rao. Ram then leaves for the pimp's brothel with two friends but finds that Rao only deals with grown women and not little children.

Back in Chennai, Ram goes to meet Nayanar, who accidentally let slip that Gautham might have been taken to another town in Andhra Pradesh although he is unsure of it. Coincidentally, the taxi driver, Rangan, who drove Ram and Lizzy to the slums, earlier meets Ram and tells him he has driven a businessman from that town back to his home after meeting Nayanaar a few years ago. The driver reluctantly agrees to take Ram there. Back in Andhra Pradesh, Ram and Rangan meet the businessman, Nallama Reddy who claims to lead an honest living by selling rice. However, Ram realizes Reddy is lying as the temple board states he is a quarry dealer. Ram holds Reddy's grandson at gunpoint and forces Reddy to reveal where Gautham is. Reddy then tells Ram his son might have been taken to a butchery at a nearby town.

At the butchery, the local gangsters already know that Ram is coming for them. Ram is prepared to face their attack. While struggling with the gang, its leader tells Ram that he already killed Gautham and sold the other children he abducted to a child trafficker in Bhopal named Nikhil Motwani after Reddy told them Ram is coming. Once the gangsters are defeated, Ram searches for Gautham's body but instead finds the corpse of another boy. Realizing that the gangsters killed the wrong boy, Ram is confident that Gautham is being taken to Bhopal and leaves immediately.

At Bhopal, Ram and Rangan manage to arrange a meeting with Motwani by posing as businessmen, but the human trafficker recognizes Ram from the news. He tells Ram that Gautham is being held by his henchman, Diwakar, and they can only release the boy if they are paid 1 crore. With no other choice, Ram calls up Lizzy to prepare the money and is taken to Diwakar's hideout. Unable to control himself after seeing a young schoolgirl almost being raped, Ram saves her by fighting off Diwakar's men and taking her to the Times of India's headquarters. When Ram and Rangan return to the hideout, they find it empty. As they explore the place, they discover that Gautham and many other abducted children have been kept prisoned there all along. Ram becomes hysterical when he finds Gautham's shirt on the floor along with his scribblings on the wall.

Once they are back on the road, Ram phones Diwakar and begs him to return Gautham but is instead taunted at. Meanwhile, Lizzy calls Rangan to tell him that she had borrowed money from friends and has banked it into Diwakar's account. When she finds out it is no longer of any use, she is devastated and faints. As Ram and Rangan prepare to leave, they are shot at by an assassin hired by Motwani. Ram survives, but Rangan is fatally shot. Before dying, Rangan reveals to Ram that he was the driver hired to drive Gautham's abductors around Chennai in search of victims. He then pleads to Ram to not give up and continue searching for his son.

Now left alone, Ram remembers his final conversation with Diwakar, who told him Gautham might be sold in Lucknow or Calcutta. He goes to Calcutta first and searches for Gautham at every place where child laborers and minor sex workers are being kept. As he comes to accept the fact that Gautham is not in the city, he phones Lizzy, whom he has not spoken to in months. She asks him to come home as there is nothing they can do to find their son now. Ram refuses to give up and heads for Lucknow. In Lucknow, Ram is found sleeping at the roadside by a kind person, Bhai, who takes him in and helps him find Gautham. Through one of his contacts, Bhai learns about a local crime boss who houses dozens of child laborers. Once there, the crime boss claims he does not deal in child trafficking and instead asks Ram to look for Diwakar in Bhopal. We are then shown in flashbacks how Ram managed to track down Diwakar, who let slip his new hiding spot during their last conversation, and killed him in a fit of anger before taking back his money. Shocked, the crime boss finally shows Ram his child laborers. Ram is too overwhelmed by the number of abducted children when each of them beg him to take them away from this place.

As Ram and Bhai prepare to leave, Ram notices that he dropped Gautham's shirt and they go back to get it back. Ram then sees one of the boys, who has terrible vision, holding the shirt. As Ram observes the boy's face closely, he realizes it is Gautham, whom he did not recognize earlier as his son has changed beyond recognition. The father and son embrace, as Bhai thanks the Lord for his blessing.

== Cast ==
- Shaam as Ram
- Poonam Kaur as Lizzy
- Master Vivethan as Gautham
- Anil Murali as Diwakar
- Munnar Ramesh as Rangan
- Nagineedu as Nallama Reddy
- P. S. Sridhar as Nayanaar
- Narayan as Saravanan, Ram's friend
- Sandra Amy as Shylaja, Lizzy's friend
- Ravi Venkatraman as Inspector

== Production ==
The venture was first reported in September 2011 with Shaam in the lead, when a poster of a candle shaped like the number 6 was unveiled, with the media initially incorrectly reporting the title as 6 Candles. The film was initially planned to also be released in Telugu due to Shaam's newfound popularity after Kick (2009). An accompanying press note mentioned that V. Z. Durai had written and directed the film, while Jeyamohan would write the dialogue. R. Madhi, Srikanth Deva and Anthony were signed on as cinematographer, music composer and editor respectively. A special medical team headed by Dr. Selvam and comprising a physiotherapist, dietitian, yoga expert, meditation guide and a physical trainer was also set up to monitor the lead actor Shaam's health during the shoot as the role required him to go through physical changes. Early reports suggested that Priyamani and later reports suggested that would play a role, but she was replaced by Poonam Kaur. The Malayalam actor Jagathy Sreekumar and the Telugu actress Archana Shastry were also reported to play supporting roles, but these reports were proven false although the latter did appear in the film's trailer.

To attain a look with big eyebags, Shaam spent more than ten days without sleeping, which resulted in a big swelling below his eyes, so much so that the actor could not even be recognised. Although his effort gained notice, several contemporary actors criticized him for taking such a risk. For another look, Shaam reduced his weight from 89 to 72 kg and grew long hair and a beard.

== Soundtrack ==
6

Soundtrack album by Srikanth Deva
- Released: 5 December 2013
- Genre: Feature film soundtrack
- Language: Tamil
- Label: Saregama
- Producer: Srikanth Deva

Srikanth Deva chronology
Arya Surya (2013)	6 (2013)	Ragalaipuram (2013)

The soundtrack was composed by Srikanth Deva collaborating with V. Z. Durai for a second time, after Nepali. Durai made his debut as a lyricist and wrote all six songs. The audio was launched on 5 December 2012 at a function attended by Sneha, Ameer, Namitha, Abbas, Bharath, Vimala Raman, Shaam, Poonam Kaur, the Kannada actor Sudeep and many others. Behindwoods wrote, "Barring one song, the album has Srikanth Deva stepping out of his comfort zone and showing his capabilities at something different."

- "Boyfriend Girlfriend" – Sathyan
- "Aagaayam Bhoomikellam" – Sathyan, Soundarya Bala Nandakumar
- "Unnai Naan Velvatha" – Roopa, Nancy Vincent
- "Bigulu Bigulu" – Soundarya, V. Z. Durai
- "Thedukindrathe" – Haricharan

== Release ==
After many postponements, the film was released on 20 September 2013.

=== Critical reception ===
The film received positive reviews. A critic from The Times of India gave 3 stars out of 5 and wrote, "Despite the flaws, the plot keeps tugging along, managing to keep us always involved about the fate of the missing lad". He also wrote, "Shaam's physical transformation for this role is astounding, but his range, when it comes to expressing emotions as a performer seems to be somewhat limited". A critic from Sify called the film "tedious" and wrote, "The only silver lining is Shaam's performance, as father struggling to come to terms between his love for his son and situations life throws up". Baradwaj Rangan from The Hindu wrote, "It should make for riveting drama, a welcome change from the endless comedies we are subjected to. But a number of factors conspire to derail the narrative, beginning with the cast". A critic from Behindwoods gave 2.75 stars out of 5 and wrote, "A movie with good research by the director, V.Z. Dhorai and earnest hard work by actor Shaam, which could have been tightened as a better product". Though the film was well appreciated the film had an average box office run.

== Awards and nominations ==
Year	Award	Category	Recipient(s) and nominee(s)	Result	Ref.
2013	Ananda Vikatan Cinema Awards	Best Villain - Male	Anil Murali	Won	
2013	Ananda Vikatan Cinema Awards	Best Story	V. Z. Durai	Won	
2013	Tamil Nadu State Film Awards	Best Stunt Director	Super Subbarayan	Won	
