= Yuvaraj Krishnasamy =

Malaysian Tamil actor and director

- Born: February 19, 1990 (age 36) (Note: He was aged 31 on 23 March 2021.); Klang, Selangor, Malaysia
- Occupation: Actor
- Years active: 2016–present
- Spouse: Aarthi Ravi

Yuvaraj Krishnasamy is a Malaysian Tamil actor and director known for acting in movies like Athaiyum Thaandi Punidhamanadhu (2020), Venpa (2019), Naam Katra Isai (2023) and numerous television series including Kalyaanam 2 Kaathal (2020–22) and directing the telefilm Manameh Ketkava (2021). His latest movie C4 Cinta (2024) is announced as the highest grossed Malaysian Tamil movie.

== Early life and career ==
Originally from Klang, Yuvaraj Krishnasamy had interest in stage plays. However, he wanted to pursue a professional career in football. In 2008 when he was 18, he went to Perugia, Italy for training. After six months, he had a knee injury and eventually had to undergo two surgeries and took an almost one-and-a-half year hiatus.

While pursuing his International Business Management degree at Sunway University, he decided to switch back to acting and worked in music videos before transitioning to short films. He starred in a short film titled Kathal Jakrethey. Director K. Kavi Nanthan cast him in the short film Venpa (2017). He made his feature film debut with the unreleased Indian Tamil film Yaazhi (2016) in a minor role. In 2019, he starred in the Indian Tamil film Lights Camera Action, which remained unreleased due to the COVID-19 pandemic. That same year, the short film Venpa was made as a feature film of the same name. He also starred in the Astro television series Kalyaanam 2 Kaathal and Vengaiyan Magan.

In 2021, Yuvaraj Krishnasamy ventured into direction with the telefilm Manameh Ketkava. He was cast in the 2022 Singaporean television series Kaki Bola since they needed an actor who knew both Malay and Tamil and knew how to play football. In 2023, he worked as a director for the Astro television series Akkam Pakkam and played one of the leads in Naam Katra Isai. In 2024, he starred in the multistarrer C4 Cinta, and the film Lights Camera Action was reported renamed Padaipali and was ready for release.

== Personal life ==
He was born in a family of six. In 2019, his younger brother, aged 28, died due to heart attack. He cited Kamal Hassan as an inspiration to get into acting and Karthik Shamalan, S. D. Puvanendran and Christopher Nolan as directors he looks up to.

== Filmography ==
=== Films ===
Year	Title	Role	Notes
2018	Thirudathey Papa Thirudathey	Krishna	
2019	Azhaggiye Thee		
2019	Venpa	Thenavan	Lead Actor
2020	Athaiyum Thaandi Punidhamanadhu		Lead Actor
2020	Aadi		Telefilm
2021	Nyabagam Irukkiratha		Telefilm
2021	Manameh Ketkava	—N/a	Telefilm; as director
2022	Tittam Pottu Kadathure Koottam		Telefilm, Lead actor
2022	Narai Vantha Piragu		Telefilm
2022	Dum Dum Dumeel	Karthik	Cameo
2023	Naam Katra Isai		Supporting role
2024	Mr & Mrs		Lead actor
2024	C4 Cinta	Hari	Lead Actor

=== Television ===
Year	Title	Role	Channel	Language	Notes
2020–2022	Kalyaanam 2 Kaathal	Harish	Astro Vinmeen HD	Tamil	
2020	Solli Tholeh		Astro Vinmeen HD	Tamil	
2020	Kanna Laddu Thinna Aasaiya		Astro Ulagam	Tamil	Deepavali web series
2021	Ippadikku Ila		Astro Vinmeen HD	Tamil	
2021	Project Anchor SPM		Astro Citra	Malay	13 episodes
2022	Vengaiyan Magan		Astro Vinmeen HD	Tamil	
2022	Kaki Bola	Sundram	Mediacorp	Malay	
2022	Detective Maniam		Digi Telecommunications	Tamil	Web series
2023	Akkam Pakkam	—N/a	Astro Vinmeen HD	Tamil	As director
2024	Banjir Raya	Mydin	Mediacorp	Malay	
2024	Iravu Vannangal		Astro Vinmeen HD	Tamil	
2024	Mei	Arul	Vasantham	Tamil	

=== Short films ===
Year	Title	Role	Ref.
2017	Venpa	Thenavan	
2018	Date Le' Disaster		

=== Music videos ===
Year	Title	Composer	Lyricist	Singer(s)	Ref.
2018	Excuse Me	Shanmugakanth	Naavin Samrat	Shanmugakanth, Thanges	
2019	Mokke Piece (from the album The Dawn of WillieBoy)	William Sagayaraj	Rajandran Murugiah	William Sagayaraj	
2020	Riya	Shane Xtreme	Janarthan Saridaran	Janarthan Saridaran	
2021	Kadhal Solle	Sundrra	Kavinaayagan Yuwaji	Kumaresh Kamalakannan, Datin Sri Shaila V	

== Awards ==
Year	Award	Category	Work	Result	Ref.
2020	Raaga Malaysian Star of the Month (December)	—N/a	—N/a	—N/a	
2022	Ulagam Awards	Popular Lead Male (Series)	Kalyaanam 2 Kaathal	Won	
2022	Ulagam Awards	Popular Lead Male (Telemovie)	Aadi	Won	
2022	Ulagam Awards	Ulagam Shining Star [Telemovie & Series]	Aadi	Nominated	
2023	Ulagam Awards	Popular Lead Male (Telemovie/Series)	Vengaiyan Magan; Kalyanaam 2 Kaathal season 2 Tittam Pottu Kadathure Koottam	Won	
2023	Ulagam Awards	Popular Telemovie of the Year	Manameh Ketkava	Won	
2023	Ulagam Awards	Best Script (Telemovie) (along with Datin Sri Shaila V)	Manameh Ketkava	Won	
2023	Ulagam Awards	Best Director (Telemovie)	Manameh Ketkava	Won	
2023	Asian Academy Creative Awards	Best Actor/Actress in a Comedy Role	Kaki Bola	Won	
2024	Nambikkai Star Icon Awards	Popular Actor	—N/a	Won	
