= Sam Jones (actor) =

Indian actor

- Born: Chennai, Tamil Nadu
- Occupations: Actor, producer
- Years active: 2018–present

Sam Jones is an Indian actor and film producer who has appeared in Tamil language films. After making his film debut in the Tamil film Yemaali (2018), He has been in films including Lisaa (2019) and Nadhi (2022).

== Career ==
Born into a family of businesspeople, Sam developed an interest in acting after watching several Tamil films. He took up acting lessons, trained in dance under Jayanthi, and took up stunt lessons from action choreographer Pandian. Sam's family friends were into film production and had given him the contact details of V. Z. Durai, who selected him to star in Yemaali (2018) after a successful screen test. He then appeared in films including the horror drama Lisaa (2019) and the fantasy comedy Dharmaprabhu (2022).

In 2022, Sam Jones produced and starred in the drama film Nadhi, on an inter-caste relationship. For his role in the film, he lost 13 kilograms and learnt Madurai slang.

== Filmography ==
| Year | Film | Role | Notes |
|---|---|---|---|
| 2018 | Yemaali | Mali | |
| 2019 | Lisaa | Jagadeesh | |
| 2019 | Dharmaprabhu | Bala | |
| 2022 | Nadhi | Thamizh | Also producer |
