= C4 Cinta =

2024 Malaysian Tamil-language romantic comedy film directed by Karthik Shamalan

- Theatrical release poster
- Directed by: Karthik Shaamalan
- Written by: Karthik Shaamalan
- Produced by: Karthik Shaamalan
- Starring: Yuvaraj Krishnasamy; Pashini; Vijay Naidu; Ravin Rao Santheran; Dishaaleny Jack
- Cinematography: Thinesh Kumar
- Music by: Shameshan Manimaran
- Production company: Scifilm
- Distributed by: Poketplay Sdn. Bhd.
- Release date: 21 November 2024
- Running time: 167 minutes
- Country: Malaysia
- Language: Tamil
- Box office: RM 2.5 million

C4 Cinta (transl. C4 love) also abbreviated as #C4C is a 2024 Malaysian Tamil-language romantic comedy film written and directed by Karthik Shaamalan. The film's storyline incorporated a multi-plot narrative connecting four romantic relationships. The film had its theatrical release on 21 November 2024 and opened to positive reviews from critics, with performances of ensemble cast members were praised and the music composition was also praised.

== Plot ==
Hari and Sonia celebrate their beachside engagement surrounded by friends and family. However, Sonia’s mother seems less than thrilled about the union. Meanwhile, Tamizh proposes to Roobini with a ring, asking her to marry him. Later, Hari confides in Viknesh that Sonia’s mother insists on matching their horoscopes before proceeding with the wedding. However, Hari’s father vehemently disagrees, dismissing astrology as baseless. Tensions rise as Hari and Sonia find themselves arguing frequently amidst the chaos of wedding preparations. At the same time, Sonia begins planning their honeymoon to the Maldives, but her mother strongly opposes the idea, warning her of a water-related disaster foreseen in Sonia’s horoscope. Sonia’s mother shares her concerns with Hari, leaving him torn between following her advice or respecting Sonia’s wishes.

Meanwhile, Tamizh invites Roobini to meet his father, but she tries to avoid the meeting by asking Viknesh to fake a phone call claiming that Hari and Sonia’s wedding has been called off. Despite the distraction, Tamizh insists on her meeting his father. To her shock, Tamizh’s father discusses their marriage plans. Feeling shocked, Roobini asks for more time, claiming she has an important meeting. This angers Tamizh, leading to a heated argument between the two. Heartbroken, Roobini confides in Sonia, urging her to appreciate Hari’s respect for her and to work together with him instead of clashing. Hari agrees to the horoscope reading but asks Sonia’s mother to keep it a secret from his father.

Hari and Sonia decide to visit Harini in Singapore to personally deliver her a wedding invitation. However, on the way, they have a massive argument about the Maldives honeymoon plan. Their fight spirals out of control, causing a devastating car crash. Both Hari and Sonia are critically injured. Hari loses his memory, while Sonia falls into a coma. Grieving, Sonia’s mother blames Hari and his father, accusing them of disregarding her warnings about the horoscope. Overwhelmed with guilt, Hari’s father promises to keep Hari away from Sonia forever.

Hari is transferred to Singapore, accompanied by Viknesh and Sukran. After his recovery, Hari’s father introduces him to a prospective bride. As Hari agrees to meet her, Viknesh and Sukran take charge of arranging the date, with Sukran booking a romantic spot at a restaurant. When Viknesh arrives at the venue to confirm the reservation, he discovers that the booking wasn’t made. To resolve the issue, he is asked to negotiate with the current customer occupying the spot. To his shock, the customer turns out to be Sonia, who is there on her first date with Mohandass. Viknesh is stunned, and when Sukran joins him, he is equally taken aback to see Sonia again in Singapore. Sonia appears not to remember Sukran or Viknesh when they see her again. Soon after, Hari arrives at the restaurant, confused to find that the spot he was supposed to use for his date is occupied. Despite Sukran and Viknesh’s attempts to stop him, Hari approaches Sonia. Neither remembers the other, and they get into a heated argument over the reservation.

Before things escalate further, Hari’s date, Easwary, arrives. She diffuses the tension with her calm demeanor, saying she’s fine with talking anywhere. Hari and Easwary decide to leave for a quiet walk. Meanwhile, Sukran and Viknesh discuss the strange coincidence of Hari and Sonia meeting again. Sukran remarks that since Sonia seems to be single, he might take a chance on her himself. Soon after, Hari, Easwary, Sukran, and Viknesh encounter Sonia and Mohandass again. Sukran secretly passes Sonia his phone number, claiming they attended the same university and even dated briefly. Later, Sukran arranges to meet Sonia again, trying to charm her and reignite a connection. Sukran organizes a reunion for all their friends. At the reunion, Hari begins to feel an inexplicable attraction to Sonia, despite not remembering their past. Despite her relationship with Mohandass, Hari finds himself drawn to her.

After the reunion, Sukran witnesses Tamizh and Roobini having a heated argument. When Tamizh lashes out physically, Sukran confronts him, leading to a fierce discussion about his unacceptable behavior. Meanwhile, Sonia and Mohandass decide to return to Malaysia. Sukran seizes the opportunity and joins them. Back in Singapore, Viknesh has a bitter confrontation with Harini, leaving him emotionally drained. Feeling dejected, he decides to go back to Malaysia for a few days. Easwary, noticing Hari’s restlessness, suggests he accompany Viknesh. However, Hari’s father strongly opposes the idea. Easwary convinces him to let Hari go, even going as far as arranging a comfortable homestay for all the friends to stay together in Malaysia. Upon arriving at the homestay, Viknesh is shocked to realize it is located in Sonia’s residential area. Sukran, however, remains composed. As Hari gazes out the window, he remarks on how familiar the surroundings feel. Sukran casually reminds him that this was a place where they all used to hang out together.

Not long after, Sukran arranges another gathering among their friends at the same beachside location where Hari and Sonia’s engagement had been held. Despite Viknesh’s warnings, Sukran extends the invitation to Sonia and Mohandass. Mohandass enthusiastically agrees, thrilled at the chance to experience friendship, something he has never truly had. At the gathering, Hari’s face lights up when he sees Sonia again. Overcome with happiness, he tries to strike up a conversation with her. However, Roobini, visibly irritated and frustrated by the secrets, discloses that Hari and Sonia were once engaged, and it had taken place at this very spot. Roobini directs her anger at Viknesh, accusing him of meddling in fate. She declares that no one has the right to keep Hari and Sonia apart if destiny is drawing them back together.

Soon she stuns to know Sonia hadn’t lost her memory at all. Roobini confronts Sukran, demanding to know the truth. Sukran admits that during one of his earlier attempts to flirt with Sonia, she had grown furious and declared that she would always be Hari’s partner, no matter what. She then asked Sukran to help her spend a few days near Hari before she left his life forever. This, Sukran reveals, was the real reason he arranged the reunion in Singapore. Now, as Hari feels an overwhelming desire to reunite with Sonia, he wrestles with guilt over his commitment to Easwary. Sukran reassures him, revealing that he had already discussed everything with Easwary. She had understood the situation and had booked the homestay near Sonia’s residential area to give Hari a chance to find closure. Determined to clear the path for Hari and Sonia, Sukran and Viknesh attempt to convince Mohandass to step aside. However, Mohandass refuses, saying he would only step back if they could find him someone else to marry.

Meanwhile, Hari’s father and Harini return to Malaysia. Hari’s father explains his firm opposition to Hari and Sonia’s relationship, saying it’s for Sonia’s own good. He sees Sonia as his own daughter and still carries the guilt and fear from her coma situation after the accident. Soon after Tamizh arrives, furious and ready for confrontation. He begins a heated argument with Roobini, berating her for discarding his engagement ring and rejecting him because his abusive behavior. His rage escalates, and he hurls insults at her, prompting Hari’s father to step in, visibly angered by Tamizh’s disrespect. Hari and Harini stand firmly by Roobini, defending her against Tamizh’s outburst. The situation grows increasingly chaotic as Sukran and Viknesh arrive. Suddenly, Tamizh breaks down, sobbing uncontrollably and exhibiting erratic, almost psychopathic behavior. He laments the end of his long-term relationship with Roobini, unable to accept that she has decided to leave him.

Sukran and Viknesh shift their focus back to convincing Mohandass to step aside. They create an AI-generated picture and voice of a "potential match" for him. The tactic works, and Mohandass finally agrees to back away from Sonia. Sukran and Viknesh arrange one final reunion at the same beachside spot where everything began. Mohandass arrives with Sonia. As the reunion unfolds, Hari and Sonia finally reconcile, patching up their relationship in a heartfelt moment witnessed by all their friends. After the reunion, Mohandass, satisfied with fulfilling his promise, approaches Sukran to demand the "girl’s" phone number. Sukran hands over a number, and Mohandass leaves with a smile. Moments later, Viknesh curiously asks Sukran whose number he gave. Sukran smirks and replies, "The number to Raaga."

== Cast ==
- Yuvaraj Krishnasamy as Hari
- Pashini as Sonia
- Vijay Naidu as Viknesh
- Ravin Rao Santheran as Sukran
- Dishaaleny Jack as Roobini
- Loga Varman as Mohandass 'Mr.Logically', Sonia's current fiancé turns friend
- Santeinii Chandrabos as Harini, Viknesh's ex-girlfriend, friend of Hari, Sonia, Sukran and Roobini
- Tivagaran as Tamizh, Roobini's abusive boyfriend
- Vhyshantiny as Easwary, Hari's girlfriend turns friend
- K.S. Maniam as Hari's father
- Mohanaraj as Sonia's elder brother
- Yuvana Sinnasamy as Sukran's friend
- Vicnes as Jeeva, Sukran’s friend
- Thivyah Vegan John as Sukran's friend
- Thia Lakshana as Helencia, Sonia's friend
- Viknesh RS as Shaam, Harini’s fiancé
- Thuraisinggam as Mohandass’s friend

Special appearances

- Emcee Ruvela as engagement guest
- Jaykishen as engagement guest
- Irfan Zaini as engagement guest
- Shameshan Manimaran as engagement guest

== Production ==
The film was shot at various places in Malaysia including Batu Caves.

== Music ==
C4 Cinta

Soundtrack album by Shameshan Mani Maran
- Released: 5 November 2024
- Genre: Feature film soundtrack
- Length: 7:18
- Language: Tamil

The film's soundtrack album and background score were composed by Shameshan Mani Maran.

Track listing
No.	Title	Lyrics	Singer	Length
1.	"Kaathal Onnu"	Karthik Shamalan	Shameshan Mani Maran	01:33
2.	"Kadhaliye"	Karthik Shamalan	Kapil Kapilan	03:03
3.	"Kadalorama"	Karthik Shamalan	Shameshan Mani Maran	02:42
4.	"Kaalam Kadanthu Pogum"	Yuwaji	JC Joe & Priyasagi Raj	03:59
5.	"Kaathal Vanthu"	Karthik Shamalan	Shameshan Mani Maran	02:34
Total length:				12:31

== Release ==
The Malaysian Tamil movie C4 Cinta release on November 21, 2024 is currently showing in numerous theaters across Malaysia. It is being screened at popular cinema chains, including GSC, TGV, LFS, MBO, and others, covering a wide range of locations. These include urban areas like Kuala Lumpur, Penang, and Johor Bahru, as well as smaller towns such as Seremban, Kuantan, Teluk Intan, Kampar, Sungai Petani and Kulim. It is accessible in over 49 theaters nationwide, ensuring good coverage for fans to watch this film. The theatres were increased to 60 by entering to 2nd week.

== Reception ==
=== Critical response ===
C4 Cinta has received widespread positive feedback since its release on November 21, 2024. It is praised for its emotional depth, strong performances, and exploration of themes like love, identity, and memory, set against vibrant backdrops in Malaysia and Singapore.

Audiences and critics alike have highlighted the compelling interwoven narratives of the characters, with standout performances by the lead actors, including the heartfelt portrayal of their relationships and challenges. The film's climax, in particular, left many viewers deeply moved. Supporting characters and comedic elements were also appreciated, adding depth and entertainment to the film.

On platforms like IMDb and TikTok, fans have lauded C4 Cinta for revitalizing Malaysian Tamil cinema and proving its ability to produce films with international appeal. Some expect it to garner accolades in the future.

Overall, the public response has been overwhelmingly positive, with many calling it one of the best Malaysian Tamil films in recent years.

=== Box office ===
C4 Cinta grossed RM452,740 nationwide on its opening second day. The film crossed RM 2 million (US$ 448K) in 10 days. This movie became the highest grossing Malaysian Tamil movie of all time thanks to direction, screenplay, acting and music even promotion boosted box office performance defeating Vedigundu Pasangge (RM 1.3M) and Maindhan (RM 903k).

== Future ==
In 2025, Karthik Shamalan said in an interview that he is working on a sequel to this film.
