= Thotti Jaya =

2005 film by V. Z. Durai

- Poster
- Directed by: V. Z. Durai
- Written by: S. Elango (Dialogue)
- Screenplay by: V. Z. Durai
- Story by: V. Z. Durai
- Produced by: Kalaipuli S. Thanu
- Starring: Silambarasan; Gopika; Pradeep Rawat
- Cinematography: R. D. Rajasekhar
- Edited by: Anthony
- Music by: Harris Jayaraj; Yuvan Shankar Raja (1 song)
- Production company: V. Creations
- Distributed by: Kalaipuli Films International
- Release date: 9 September 2005
- Running time: 151 minutes
- Country: India
- Language: Tamil

Thotti Jaya is a 2005 Indian Tamil-language action film written and directed by Durai and produced by Kalaipuli S. Thanu. The film stars Silambarasan in the titular role with Gopika plays the female lead, while Pradeep Rawat (in his Tamil debut) essays a supporting role. The soundtrack was composed by Harris Jayaraj with cinematography by R. D. Rajasekhar and Anthony.

The film was released on 9 September 2005 and received positive response from both audience and critics and was a success at the box office.

== Plot ==
Jayachandran is an orphan working in a hotel as a helper. It is assumed he gets his title name "Thotti Jaya", as he is found in a garbage bin as an infant. One day he beats and fends off a man who gets into a squabble with the hotel owner. The following night, the hotel owner rewards him with cash and dreads him the next morning. He realises people only respect the people they fear, so he walks out from the hotel and reaches Chennai. He is spotted by Seena Thana and is hired as a henchman. In an incident, Thotti Jaya gets entangled in a political and police trap. To escape from the police, he slips to Calcutta and goes into hiding. Meanwhile, Brinda, a college girl from Kanyakumari, comes to Calcutta on a tour along with her friends. Pimps operating in the red light area of Calcutta take her away. Thotti Jaya accidentally meets Brinda when she tries to escape from the gang. He helps Brinda escape from the gang and takes her safely to Kanyakumari. On her way back home by train, Brinda starts admiring Thotti Jaya's niceties and gradually falls in love with him. When she expresses her desire, Thotti Jaya reciprocates her love, and both decide to enter into wedlock, but little does he know that Brinda is actually Seena Thana's daughter. Thotti Jaya takes Brinda away from her house and earns Seena Thana's wrath. Angered by this, Seena Thana summons his rowdy gangs and plots to bump off Thotti Jaya. How Thotti Jaya accomplishes his hopes of marrying Brinda is told in the remaining part of the story.

== Cast ==
- Silambarasan as Jayachandran a.k.a. Thotti Jaya
- Gopika as Brinda
- Pradeep Rawat as Seena Thana
- Vadivukkarasi
- Cochin Haneefa
- G. M. Sundar as Santhanam
- Vincent Asokan as Muthu Ganesh
- Ceylon Manohar as Nagu
- G. M. Kumar as Hotel Owner
- Mahanadi Shankar
- O. A. K. Sundar
- Rajendran as Henchman
- R. D. Rajasekhar as a gangster (cameo appearance)
- Linda Arsenio as a bar dancer (item number in the song "Yaari Singaari")

== Production ==
After completing Sachein, producer Kalaipuli S. Thanu approved a plotline narrated by V. Z. Durai. Durai wanted Jeevan to play the lead role and also conducted test shoots with him, but the director was not impressed with his performance, so he replaced him with Silambarasan. Thanu was initially reluctant to have him as the lead actor since Thanu had misunderstandings with his father T. Rajendar during the time of Cooliekkaran; he later made up his mind. Nayanthara was initially selected as the heroine, but she was replaced with Gopika. Thotti Gaja was an early title for the film before Thotti Jaya was confirmed. The film was launched at Sathyam Cinemas in July 2004. Silambarasan refused to dub for the film after shooting citing salary problems; the problem was resolved in Tamil Nadu Producers Council.

== Soundtrack ==
There are six songs composed by Harris Jayaraj, who collaborated with Durai and Silambarasan for the second time. Lyrics are written by Na. Muthukumar, Thamarai, Kabilan. Yuvan Shankar Raja, who was first signed as the music director, composed the song titled "Indha Ooru" for the film. This song was not included in the soundtrack album and was credited in the movie title card. It was used only in the Tamil version of the movie and was replaced in Telugu version by the song "Ee Calcutta" composed by Harris."Yaaridamum" was re-used from Harris's song "Ye Chilipi" from Telugu film Gharshana, a remake of Tamil film Kaakha Kaakha, in which film Harris himself was the music director. The tune and beat of the song "Achu Vellam" is similar to the title song of the Bollywood film Rang De Basanti (2006), in which film the music director was A. R. Rahman.

Track-List
No.	Title	Lyrics	Music	Singer(s)	Length
1.	"Thotta Poweru Da"	Na. Muthukumar	Harris Jayaraj	Shankar Mahadevan	4:54
2.	"Acchu Vellam"	Na. Muthukumar	Harris Jayaraj	Ranjith, Saindhavi, Shankar Mahadevan	5:10
3.	"Uyire En Uyire"	Na. Muthukumar	Harris Jayaraj	Anuradha Sriram, Bombay Jayashri, Karthik	5:28
4.	"Yaaridamum"	Thamarai	Harris Jayaraj	Harini, Ramesh Vinayagam	4:57
5.	"Yaari Singari"	Kabilan	Harris Jayaraj	Ceylon Manohar, Karthik, Sriram Parthasarathy, Srilekha Parthasarathy	5:02
6.	"Theme" (Instrumental)		Harris Jayaraj		1:34
7.	"Indha Ooru"	Karthik Netha	Yuvan Shankar Raja	Mathangi Jagdish	5:08
Total length:					32:13

Telugu Track-List
No.	Title	Lyrics	Singer(s)	Length
1.	"Pyari Singari"	Vanamali	Karthik, M. M. Srilekha, Sriram Parthasarathy	5:03
2.	"Ee Calcutta"	Siva Ganesh	Rajya Lakshmi	3:27
3.	"Adda Manadira"	Vanamali	Tippu	4:55
4.	"Ulike O Chilake"	Vanamali	Karthik, Bombay Jayashri	5:27
5.	"Aggilanti Valape"	Vanamali	Tippu, Saindhavi	5:11
Total length:				24:03

== Reception ==
Lajjavathi of Kalki called Silambarasan as the film's biggest plus and praised his performance while also appreciating Gopika's acting, cinematography and praised Jayaraj's background score but felt his songs did not stay in the mind and added the film did not have separate comedy track which is a relief. Sify wrote "Silambarasan?s Thottijaya?s premise is promising and interesting in the first half but later it peters out as a violent film reduced to a staple 'masala' formula. Director V.Z.Dorai who has made that memorable Mughavari in the past, gets influenced by Ramgopal Varma style of underworld stories. The story is reminiscent of Satya in the first half but Dorai lacks sheer grit and the film ends up as a stock revenge drama with mindless action and item numbers". Behindwoods wrote "Altogether, Totti Jaya is a movie mixed with action and emotions in a right manner!" Malathi Rangarajan of The Hindu appreciated the cinematography but criticised the story for lacking newness and added, "The screenplay of the first half of `Thotti Jaya' is refreshing. But the film flounders as the climax nears".

== Legacy ==
Vijay Chandar's film Sangathamizhan, having Vijay Sethupathi in the lead role, had a scene in which comedian Soori was shown to imitate the gangster look of black along with Thotti Jaya songs played.

== Sequel ==
During an interview in 2022, Durai announced that he already completed the script for the sequel.
