= Murungakkai Chips =

2021 Indian film

- Theatrical release poster
- Directed by: Srijar
- Written by: Srijar
- Produced by: Ravindar Chandrasekaran
- Starring: Shanthanu Bhagyaraj; Athulya Ravi
- Cinematography: Ramesh Chakravarthy
- Edited by: Jomin
- Music by: Dharan Kumar
- Production companies: Libra Productions; Firstman Film Works
- Release date: 10 December 2021
- Country: India
- Language: Tamil

Murungakkai Chips (English: Drumstick chips) is a 2021 Indian Tamil-language adult comedy film written and directed by debutant Srijar and produced by Libra Productions and Firstman Film Works. The film stars Shanthanu Bhagyaraj and Athulya Ravi. The film's music and score is composed by Dharan Kumar. The film released in theatres on 10 December 2021.

== Plot ==
Arjun (Shanthanu Bhagyaraj) and Shanthi (Athulya Ravi) have just tied the knot in an arranged marriage. Just before their first night together, Arjun's grandfather (K. Bhagyaraj) informs him that according to their family tradition, the husband should not touch his wife on the first night, failing which he will lose his entire wealth (worth 300 crores) to an orphanage. At much about the same time, Shanthi's aunt (Urvashi) informs her that she should make sure that she has sex the very first night because women in their family who did not do so went childless. There is also the family manager Lingusamy (Manobala) and his wife (Jangiri Madhumitha), who plot against Arjun to somehow fail his grandfather so that they can take a commission from an orphanage owner. The rest of the screenplay is whether the bride or groom won their bedroom battle.

== Cast ==
- Shanthanu Bhagyaraj as Arjun
- Athulya Ravi as Vijaya Shanthi
- K. Bhagyaraj as Arjun's grandfather
- Urvashi as Shanti's aunt
- Manobala as Lingusamy
- Jangiri Madhumitha as Lingusamy's wife
- Yogi Babu as Saravanan
- Munishkanth as Daas
- Mayilsamy as Kuyilsamy
- Lollu Sabha Manohar as Ganeshan
- Raju Jeyamohan as Saravanan's friend
- Ravindhar Chandrasekaran as Ulganathan
- 'Poo' Maila as Tulasi
- Rekha Nair as Anu, Shanti’s Sister
- Teju Ashwini

== Music ==
Murungakkai Chips

Soundtrack album by Dharan Kumar
- Genre: Feature film soundtrack
- Length: 14:15
- Language: Tamil
- Label: Sony Music
- Producer: Dharan Kumar

The film's soundtrack is composed by Dharan Kumar. The soundtrack album featured three songs and the audio rights were acquired by Sony Music.

Track listing
No.	Title	Lyrics	Singer(s)	Length
1.	"Edho Solla"	Ravindhar Chandrasekaran	Sid Sriram	5:16
2.	"Talku Lessu Worku Moreu"	Ku Karthik	Sivaangi Krishnakumar, Sam Vishal	4:11
3.	"Wildu Strawberry"	Ravindhar Chandrasekaran, Mali	Priya Mali	4:48
Total length:				14:15

== Release ==
The film released in theatres on 10 December 2021 and received poor reviews from critics. The movie was declared as a flop.

== Reception ==
Suganth of The Times of India gave a rating of 1.5 out on 5 and wrote, "For a supposedly adult comedy, the scenes inside the first night room are downright juvenile, with the conversations between the two leads hardly coming across as pillow talk." and verdict as "a flaccid adult comedy". Sify gave a rating of 1.5 out on 5 and wrote, "Murungakkai Chips is a wannabe adult comedy!".
