= Nadhi =

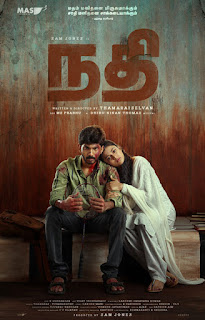
- Directed by: K. Thamaraiselvan
- Written by: K. Thamaraiselvan
- Produced by: Sam Jones
- Starring: Sam Jones; Anandhi; Karu Pazhaniappan
- Cinematography: M. S. Prabhu
- Edited by: R.Sudharshan
- Music by: Dhibu Ninan Thomas
- Production company: MAS Cinemas
- Distributed by: AP International
- Release date: 22 July 2022
- Country: India
- Language: Tamil

Nadhi (English: River) is a 2022 Indian Tamil-language romantic action drama film directed by K. Thamaraiselvan. The film stars Sam Jones, Anandhi and Karu Pazhaniappan in the lead roles. It was released on 22 July 2022.

== Cast ==
- Sam Jones as Thamizh
- Anandhi as Bharathi
- Karu Pazhaniappan
- Munishkanth as Manikkam
- Vela Ramamoorthy
- A. Venkatesh
- Pravin Adithya
- Micset Sriram
- Kodangi Vadivel Murugan

== Production ==
For his role in the film, Sam Jones lost 13 kilograms and learnt Madurai slang. Karu Pazhaniappan, who had been attempting to make a breakthrough as an actor in lead roles, opted to work as the film's antagonist after being impressed with the script.

The film was shot in regions including Madurai and Munnar.

== Music ==
Nadhi

Soundtrack album by Dhibu Ninan Thomas
- Released: 2022
- Studio: Grace Studios, 20 Db
- Genre: Feature film soundtrack
- Length: 11:45
- Language: Tamil
- Label: Sony Music

Dhibu Ninan Thomas chronology
| Nenjuku Needhi (2022) | Nadhi (2022) | Chithha (2023) |

Singles from Nadhi
- 1. "Theera Nadhi" Released: 9 February 2022

The film's soundtrack was composed by Dhibu Ninan Thomas. while lyrics are written by Thamarai.

Track listing
| No. | Title | Lyrics | Singer(s) | Length |
|---|---|---|---|---|
| 1. | "Pogadhey" | Thamarai | Anila Rajeev | 4:02 |
| 2. | "Theera Nadhi" | Thamarai | Kapil Kapilan, Srinisha Jayaseelan | 4:20 |
| 3. | "Kathari Poovasam" | Yugabharathi | Sinduri Vishal, Deepthi Suresh, Soundarya Nandakumar, Bhargavi Sridhar, Aravind Srinivas, Saisharan, Shenbagaraj, Santhosh Hariharan | 3:23 |

== Reception ==
The film was released on 22 July 2022 across Tamil Nadu. The critic from Times of India noted that it was "an anti-caste love story that could have been more powerful", adding "Nadhi flows seamlessly in the first half, quenching all our thirst. But as the film progresses, it loses its track leaving the audience drained out". Vignesh Madhu of Cinema Express wrote that "Not really. The characters or their conflicts aren't new. Their tragic ending isn't new. There's no resolution. There's no hope. Just like this film" and gave 2 stars out of 5.

A critic from Dina Malar gave the film a middling review, rating it 2 out of 5 stars. Likewise, a critic from The Hindu also gave the film a mixed review.
