= Lisaa =

2019 Tamil horror film by Raju Viswanath

- Poster
- Directed by: Raju Viswanath
- Written by: Raju Viswanath
- Produced by: P. G. Muthiah
- Starring: Anjali; Sam Jones; Makarand Deshpande
- Cinematography: PG Muthiah
- Edited by: SN Fazil
- Music by: Santhosh Dhayanidhi
- Production company: PG Media Works
- Release date: 24 May 2019
- Running time: 104 minutes
- Country: India
- Language: Tamil

Lisaa is a 2019 Indian Tamil stereoscopic horror film written and directed by Raju Viswanath on his directorial debut. The film stars Anjali, Sam Jones and Makarand Deshpande (in his Tamil debut). This film is India's first ever stereoscopic 3D horror film. This film is an uncredited remake from The Visit. The film opened to mixed reviews.

== Plot ==
Lisaa decides to meet her grandparents and get a nod from them for her single mother's second marriage. As Lisaa is planning to leave for the US, she wants her mother to have a companion and hence, insists that her mother should remarry.

However, Lisaa's mother says that her husband unexpectedly lost his life only because she married him without the consent of her parents. Now, Lisaa, along with her friend Jagadeesh go on a five-day trip to the Western Ghats to convince her grandparents.

From the beginning, Lisaa and Jaggu find that the former's grandparents behave abnormally. They both think that their grandparents are ghosts, but actually, they are psychos, and not their real grandparents. Then the psycho grandpa starts chasing Lisaa, to a shed where he tries to kill her, but Sharada, who is Lisa's real grandma, saves Lisaa. Finally, the police catch the psycho grandpa, who tells them that he kills children who disrespect their parents, as his own son had done to him. It also turns out that the psycho grandpa was in an old age home, where the owner had been evicted, and so they travelled to Lisaa's grandparents' house to ask for donations, where they found the old couple dead in each other's arms, and the psycho grandpa and grandma take their place.

== Cast ==
- Anjali as Lisaa
- Sam Jones as Jagadeesh (Jaggu)
- Makarand Deshpande as Dhananjayan / Raghavan
- Brahmanandam as LKG, Jaggu's father
- Surekha Vani as Jaggu's mother
- Kalyani Natarajan as Lisaa's mother
- Saleema as Saradha / Nancy
- Yogi Babu as Priest
- Mime Gopi as Shankar
- Sabbita Roi

== Production ==
The film was announced by debutant director Raju Viswanath and revealed that the film will be woman oriented thriller based genre starring Anjali in the main lead. The filming began during July 2018 with most of the scenes of the film were shot in Kodaikanal and Hyderabad. The scenes with Brahmanandam and Surekha Vani were shot in Telugu. The film was also dubbed in Hindi. The portions of the film were cranked using Helium 8K camera with the film made using 3D technology.

== Soundtrack ==
The soundtrack was composed by Santhosh Dhayanidhi.

Lisaa

Soundtrack album by Santhosh Dhayanidhi
- Released: 2019
- Genre: Feature film soundtrack
- Length: 12:13
- Label: Saregama Tamil
- Producer: Santhosh Dhayanidhi

Santhosh Dhayanidhi chronology
Madura Veeran (2018)	Lisaa (2019)	Thumbaa (2019)

Track listing (Tamil)
No.	Title	Singer(s)	Length
1.	"Neethane En Thoovanam"	Swagatha S. Krishnan	4:01
2.	"Raththa Vettai"	Deepthi Suresh, Ala B Bala, Veena Murali, Sowmya Ramani Mahadevan, Mahalingam	2:37
3.	"Aararo Aariraro"	Bamba Bakya	2:51
4.	"Lisaa Lisaa"	Varun Parandhaman	2:44
Total length:			12:13

== Reception ==
The film received mixed reviews from critics. Times of India wrote "With cardboard characters and storytelling that lacks depth, even 3D doesn’t save this good script." India Today wrote "Anjali's Lisaa abounds with jump scares and insipid comic scenes. Debutant director Raju Viswanath has a decent premise." Sify wrote "It’s quite evident that debutant director Raju Viswanath has touched the untold stories of the elder citizen added an emotional ending along with a supernatural angle to serve it as the typical Tamil horror thriller, which ends with a preachy social message."
