= Adai Mazhai Kaalam =

- Theatrical release poster
- Directed by: Karthik Shaamalan
- Written by: Karthik Shaamalan
- Produced by: Karthik Shaamalan
- Starring: Loga Varman; Thia Lakshana; Evarani; Sasitharan K Rajoo
- Cinematography: Karthik Shaamalan
- Edited by: Kumarann Arumugam
- Music by: Shamesan Mani Maran
- Production company: S Cape Imagination
- Distributed by: Poketplay Sdn. Bhd.
- Release date: 26 January 2023
- Running time: 145 minutes
- Country: Malaysia
- Language: Tamil

Adai Mazhai Kaalam (transl. Heavy rain season) is a 2023 Malaysian Tamil-language romantic fantasy film written and directed by Karthik Shamalan. The cast includes Loga Varman, Thia Lakshana, Jaykishen, Vicky Rao, Velarasan, Evarani, and KS Maniam. The music was composed by Shameshan Mani Maaran.

The film, which opened 26 January 2023, had a successful opening weekend and ran for more than 60 days. It is thought to have enjoyed the highest opening weekend in Malaysia for an Indian language film since the COVID-19 pandemic. The film received positive reviews from the audience.

The film was also released on Netflix in June 2023 under the title The Eclipse. (Note: While Business Upturn reported that the film will stream on Netflix on 9 June 2023, Pricebaba reported that the film will stream on Netflix on 11 June 2023.)

== Cast ==
- Loga Varman as Suriyan
- Thia Lakshana as Chandra
- Evarani as Alaggamma
- Vicky Rao as Jack Rajagopal
- Jaykishen as Batmanathan / Batman
- Ruvela as Jokim / Joker
- K.S. Manian as Prof Mayilvaganam
- Sasitharan Rajoo as Bonu, the ex-cupid

== Reception ==
Vikas Yadav of Midgard Times rated the film 3.5/10 and wrote that "Since you live only once, you should avoid watching movies like The Eclipse. They don't provide a very pleasant experience". P Sangeetha of OTTplay rated the film 3/5 and wrote that "This Malaysian romantic fantasy drama, helmed by Karthik Shaamalan, is like having a hot cup of coffee on a rainy day. The feel-good film that revolves around second chances, makes for a pleasant watch, courtesy the interesting storyline and a fantastic star cast".

== Accolades ==
The film won several accolades.

Award	Category	Result
Toronto Tamil Film Festival	Best Emerging Director	Won
Norway Tamil Film Festival Awards	Best Cinematography	Won
Norway Tamil Film Festival Awards	Best Supporting Actress	Won
LA Film Festival	Best Indie Feature	Won
Alternative Film Festival New York	Best International Feature Film	Nominated
Alternative Film Festival New York	Best Actress	Nominated
3rd Malaysian Indian Creative Awards	Best Debut Actor	Won
3rd Malaysian Indian Creative Awards	Best Supporting Actress	Won
3rd Malaysian Indian Creative Awards	Best Debut Actress	Won
3rd Malaysian Indian Creative Awards	Best Script Writer	Won
3rd Malaysian Indian Creative Awards	Best Music Director	Won
3rd Malaysian Indian Creative Awards	Best Artwork Poster	Won
3rd Malaysian Indian Creative Awards	Best Lyricist	Won
3rd Malaysian Indian Creative Awards	Best Movie	Nominated
3rd Malaysian Indian Creative Awards	Best Director	Nominated
3rd Malaysian Indian Creative Awards	Best Actor	Nominated
3rd Malaysian Indian Creative Awards	Best Actress	Nominated
3rd Malaysian Indian Creative Awards	Best Supporting Actor	Nominated
3rd Malaysian Indian Creative Awards	Best Comedian	Nominated

== See also ==
- Malaysian Tamil cinema
