= Chennai City Gangsters =

2025 Tamil heist film

- Theatrical release poster
- Directed by: Vikram Rajeshwar; Arun Keshav
- Written by: Vikram Rajeshwar
- Produced by: Bobby Balachandran
- Starring: Vaibhav; Athulya Ravi; Anandaraj; Livingston; Manikandan Rajesh
- Cinematography: Tijo Tomy
- Edited by: Suresh A Prasad
- Music by: D. Imman
- Production company: BTG Universal
- Release date: 20 June 2025
- Country: India
- Language: Tamil
- Box office: est. ₹9.7 crore

Chennai City Gangsters is a 2025 Indian Tamil-language comedy heist film written by Vikram Rajeshwar and directed along with Arun Keshav and produced by Bobby Balachandran under his BTG Universal banner. The film stars Vaibhav, Athulya Ravi and Manikandan Rajesh in the lead roles, alongside an ensemble cast including Anandaraj, Livingston, Rajendran, John Vijay, Redin Kingsley, and Ilavarasu in supporting roles. The film has music scored by D. Imman, cinematography handled by Tijo Tomy, and editing by Suresh A Prasad.

Chennai City Gangsters released in theatres on 20 June 2025.

== Plot ==
Paandi and Poochi, lifelong friends and petty thieves, are raised by Pasupathy, a former drug peddler and thief turned businessman who now owns a pizza restaurant. Psycho Salim, a retired goon, is planning a fake robbery worth ₹2 crore at his house to claim the insurance money. He enlists Pasupathy's help, asking him to keep the jewels safe and promising to return Pasupathy's cash and jewels once the insurance money is received. Pasupathy tasks Paandi and Poochi with carrying out the fake robbery at Psycho Salim's house. However, the duo gets the door number wrong and ends up at Door No. 56 instead of 65, where they brutally beat up the occupant, Inspector Aabathu, a police officer. After being reprimanded by Pasupathy, Paandi and Poochi proceed to Psycho Salim's house and complete the robbery. During their celebratory drinking spree, they transfer the looted money to a new backpack, and Paandi buys an identical bag and hands it over to a rag picker. Unbeknownst to them, a rag picker mistakes Paandi's bag for his own and takes it, leaving Paandi and Poochi with a bag full of trash.

Meanwhile, Paandi harbors unrequited love for Jennifer "Jenny," Pasupathy's France-returned daughter and their childhood friend. The police investigation into the theft at Psycho Salim's house is led by none other than Inspector Aabathu, who was beaten by Paandi and Poochi earlier. Nettai, who was saved by Paandi and Poochi in a bar fight, reaches out to them for help in retrieving the lost money. They, in turn, contact four former gangsters: Memory Dass, who suffers from memory loss; Dhamuthara "Damar" Lal, a deaf gangster; Kudi Kumar, a drunkard; and Split Soosai, a gangster with split memory who thinks he's also a policeman. These four eccentric gangsters agree to help Paandi and Poochi. Initially, Paandi and Poochi plan to loot a jewelry shop with these four aged gangsters. However, their disabilities and carelessness foil the plan, leading Paandi and Poochi to abandon the idea in frustration.

Later, Paandi returns to the aged gangsters as they reveal their plan to loot the World Oriental Wealth (WOW) Bank. The gangsters had previously attempted to rob the bank with the help of the bank's manager, Dharman, who provided them with the floor plan. However, Dharman betrayed them, and they were arrested. During their prison term, they developed various disabilities due to fear and torture. Feeling sympathetic towards the aged gangsters, Paandi decides to cooperate with them to loot the bank and exact revenge on Dharman. To execute their plan, they set up a fake pizza shop near the bank, using Jenny as a front. From this shop, they begin digging a 1.5 km long subway leading to the bank's locker, which is already 50% complete.

Minister Sengundran's private videos have been leaked, and the person holding the videos is threatening him. Sengundran seeks Inspector Aabathu's help to delete the video and eliminate the threat. Before Aabathu can capture the person, he dies from a dog attack. Aabathu learns that the private videos are on a pen drive hidden in the WOW Bank locker. Aabathu plans to set up a fake robbery attempt at the bank, allowing him to take charge and retrieve the pen drive. Meanwhile, Pasupathy learns that Paandi and Poochi have lost Psycho Salim's ₹2 crore money and, fearing Salim's wrath, joins them to dig a subway to the bank. As they dig intensely, they finally reach below WOW Bank. Before entering the bank, Split Soosai suggests kidnapping Dharman's daughter, Priya. Paandi and his team kidnap Priya, who is planning to elope with her boyfriend. However, Paandi decides to reunite Priya with her lover, and Jenny confesses her feelings for Paandi after witnessing his good deed. Memory Dass forgets about the kidnapping plan and starts cooking at Dharman's house. Later, he remembers and kidnaps Priya again, leading to a ransom demand of ₹1 crore from Dharman.

The rag picker opens the bag and finds it filled with money and jewels, and places them in his locker at WOW Bank. Meanwhile, Paandi and his team sneak into the locker room, and Aabathu's fake theft team also enters the bank. With the expertise of the 4 aged gangsters, they open the locker, and Paandi retrieves his lost bag containing ₹2 crore, which the rag picker had just placed there a few minutes ago. They further loot the locker, and Sengundran's pen drive is mistakenly taken by Paandi during the loot. Before Aabathu arrives to take control of the bank locker, Paandi and his team escape with the money via the subway, but Split Soosai gets caught and his split personality behavior emerges, causing him to behave like a police officer. Meanwhile, Paandi loses Sengundran's pen drive, which is picked up by a group of transgender people on the road. They hand it over to Sengundran's PA, who mistakenly plays the minister's private video in front of a public gathering, making it go viral.

Psycho Salim apprehends Pasupathy and his family for losing his money. Paandi and Poochi arrive just in time with the money, freeing them from Psycho Salim's clutches. Aabathu and the police team arrive to retrieve the pen drive, unaware that Sengundran's video has already gone viral. During the fight, Jenny proposes her love to Paandi. A shootout and a fight ensue between Paandi's team and the police. Just as they realize the chaos, a news report states that the Indian currency notes have been completely devalued, rendering their entire looted money worthless. Paandi's team then remembers the ransom jewels given by Dharman, which are kept near a highway stone. However, before they can retrieve them, the same rag picker takes the bag containing the jewels.

== Cast ==
- Vaibhav as Paandi
- Athulya Ravi as Jennifer "Jenny"
- Anandaraj as Split Soosai
- Livingston as Pei Pasupathy, Jenny's father
- Rajendran as Memory Dass
- John Vijay as Dhamuthara "Damar" Lal
- Redin Kingsley as Nettai
- Sunil Reddy as Kudi Kumar
- Manikandan Rajesh as Poochi
- Surya Ganapathy as Priya, Dharman's daughter
- Ilavarasu as Minister Sengundran
- Shihan Hussaini as Psycho Salim
- Chaams as Constable Aandhai Kannan
- Bipin as Inspector Aabathu
- Mathew Varghese as Dharman, WOW bank manager
- Kalaiyarasan Kannusami as a ragpicker
- Kalki Raja as Sengundran's PA

== Production ==
=== Development ===
On 24 October 2023, actor Vaibhav who was then last seen in Buffoon (2022) announced his untitled project directed by the debutant duo brothers Vikram Rajeshwar and Arun Keshav and produced by Bobby Balachandran under BTG Universal headed by Dr. M. Manoj Beno. The film marks the first time collaboration of the brothers Vaibhav and Sunil Reddy sharing screenspace together and the film's director Vikram Rajeshwar who had earlier worked on advertisements was revealed to be the son of an acclaimed Tamil filmmaker and screenwriter K. Rajeshwar known for the classics Idhaya Thamarai (1990), Amaran (1992) and Kovilpatti Veeralakshmi (2003) as director and for Panneer Pushpangal (1981), Kadalora Kavithaigal (1986) and Seevalaperi Pandi (1994) as writer.

Athulya Ravi was announced to play the female lead along with an ensemble cast including Anandaraj, Rajendran, John Vijay, Redin Kingsley and Ilavarasu in this romantic heist comedy film. Music composer D. Imman, editor Suresh A Prasad and cinematographer Tijo Tomy were chosen for the technical crew.

=== Filming ===
Principal photography began on 25 October 2023, and was planned in two schedules for 35 days and to wrap the filming by December with major portions being shot in places in and around Chennai. On 13 April 2024, the makers announced that the entire filming had been wrapped up.

== Music ==
Chennai City Gangsters

Soundtrack album by D. Imman
- Studios: D.Imman’s Sound Factory (Audio suite A and B), Chennai
- Genre: Feature film soundtrack
- Language: Tamil
- Label: BTG Music
- Producer: D. Imman

D. Imman chronology
Eleven (2025)	Chennai City Gangsters (2025)

Singles from Chennai City Gangsters
- 1. "Meyya Mummari" Released: 21 August 2024; 2. "My Maima (Promo Song)" Released: 21 September 2024; 3. "O Meri Jaan" Released: 24 October 2024

The music and background score is composed by D. Imman. The first single "Meyya Mummari" lyrical video was released on 21 August 2024 and the video song was released on 29 August 2024. The audio launch was held on 18 September 2024 in Chennai. The promo song "My Maima" was released on 21 September 2024, and had lyrics written by Super Subu and Ofro, with Ofro also singing along with Gana Guna and Gaana Dharani. The third single "O Meri Jaan" was released on 24 October 2024.

Track listing
No.	Title	Writer(s)	Singer(s)	Length
1.	"Meyya Mummari"	Karthik Netha	Karthik	3:35
2.	"My Maima (Promo Song)"	Super Subu, Ofro	Gana Guna, Gaana Dharani, Ofro	3:36
3.	"O Meri Jaan"	Karunakaran	Vijay Prakash, Chinmayi Sripada	3:24

== Marketing ==
On 25 December 2023, the project's title Chennai City Gangsters, a callback to the famous song of Anirudh Ravichander from the film Vanakkam Chennai (2013) was announced through a first-look poster. On 27 March 2024, a one-minute long motion poster showing a gang digging to loot a bank, and a wanted list poster following a chase scene was released along with the second-look poster. Following an audio launch event, the teaser was released on 18 August 2024. The makers began releasing the individual character reveal posters from 3 September 2024. The film trailer was released on 7 October 2024.

== Release ==
=== Theatrical ===
Chennai City Gangsters released in theatres on 20 June 2025.

== Reception ==
Abhinav Subramanian of The Times of India gave 2/5 stars and wrote "Director Vikram Rajeshwar seems to operate on quantity over quality, firing jokes like a malfunctioning comedy cannon. The film treats its plot as optional scaffolding for sketch comedy, but forgets that even sketch comedy needs timing." Jayabhuvaneshwari B of Cinema Express gave 1.5/5 stars and wrote "The setups are promising, but the punchlines fizzle out before they can crack the vault of real humour. In the end, Chennai City Gangsters feels like a heist movie where the biggest thing stolen is the audience’s time, with no getaway car in sight."
