= Venpa (film) =

2019 film directed by K. Kavi Nanthan

- Theaterical Poster
- Directed by: K. Kavi Nanthan
- Written by: K. Kavi Nanthan
- Starring: Yuvaraj Krishnasamy; Agalyah Maniam; Santeinii Chandra Bos; Thevaguru Suppiah
- Cinematography: Senthil Kumaran Muniandy
- Edited by: Shanker Indra
- Music by: Varmman Elangkovan
- Production company: Vadai Productions
- Distributed by: DMY Creation
- Release date: 19 September 2019
- Running time: 2 hours 35 minutes
- Country: Malaysia
- Language: Tamil
- Box office: RM542,686.60

Venpa is a 2019 Malaysian Tamil-language romantic comedy directed by K. Kavi Nanthan and starring Yuvaraj Krishnasamy, Agalyah Maniam, Santeinii Chandra Bos and Thevaguru Suppiah. In the film, a girl falls for a boy, but the boy loves another girl from his past. The story revolves around the three of them meeting and having a conversation about love and conflict and how it changes their lives.

The film was released on September 19, 2019, in Malaysia, and received positive reviews. It is an expanded version of the 2017 short film Venpa with the same director and cast. Venpa was the first Malaysian Tamil-language film distributed by DMY Creation.

== Synopsis ==
The movie revolves around Thenavan, played by Yuvraj Krishnasamy, who rejects the women his mother chooses for him. Sheila, played by Santeinii Chandrabos, is a sweet girl who falls in love with Thenavan after he shows her kindness. However, Thenavan is still in love with Kalyani, played by Agalyah Maniam, whom he has loved since his school days, but she seems to have no feelings for him. The story takes a turn when Kalyani's handbag is stolen upon her arrival back to Malaysia. Thenavan helps her and asks her for an hour of conversation as a return favour. The conversation becomes a turning point for Thenavan, Kalyani, and Sheila, as well as Sathya, Kalyani's former lover. The movie then delves into a flashback, where we see Kalyani's school days and how Thenavan develops feelings for her while leading a training session. He initially appears strict with a male student, but when Kalyani makes the same mistake, he speaks to her gently. From that moment, Thenavan falls in love with Kalyani. However, when he confesses his love to his senior, Satya, Satya gets angry and scolds him, warning him not to express his love to Kalyani. Thenavan decides to focus on his studies and stops thinking about Kalyani. On his last day of SPM examination, he plans to meet Kalyani and confess his love, but Satya interrupts and offers to treat Thenavan at a Mamak Shop near the school. there he gets to know that Kalyani and Sathya are in a relationship. heartbroken, Thennavan decides to move on. as the flashback ends, Thennavan gets to know from Kalyani that she is currently single and she is also interested in him. he plans on pursuing Kalyani but things takes a turn after Sathya contacts Kalyani after years. after a series of events, Thennavan learns the reason behind Sathya and Kalyani's breakup which is because Sathya, who is a doctor now, cheated on Kalyani with archana after Kalyani went to australia for her higher studies. by coincidence, Thennavan bumps into Sathya at a hospital and gets to know that Sathya did not really cheat on Kalyani and he lied to her to make her hate him by saying that he cheated on her to hide the fact that he got exposed to HIV because of archana who is also a doctor, was sleepy during night shift and accidentally injects Sathya using a syringe which was used to collect blood from an AIDS patient. years later, Sathya, who is now Thennavan decides to make Sathya and Kalyani meet for one last time. after a series of events, he successfully brings both of them to the place where Sathya and Kalyani used to hang out the most when they were a couple but as soon as Kalyani realises that Sathya is there, she shouts at him and tells him to go and die. seconds later, Sathya passes out and Thennavan and his friend brings him to the hospital. there, Kalyani gets to know that he's really dying and he never cheated on her and he lied for her sake. heartbroken, she watches doctors trying to revive Sathya but he dies.

== Cast ==
- Yuvaraj Krishnasamy as Thenavan
- Agalyah Maniam as Kalyani
- Santeinii Chandrabos as Sheila
- Thevaguru Suppiah as Sathya
- Nanthini Sugumaran as Archana
- Kuben Mahadevan as Jo Mama
- Mugen Rao as Yuvaraj Balakrishnan "YB" (Cameo appearance)

== Soundtrack ==
The music was composed by Varmman Elangkovan.

Track listing
No.	Title	Singer(s)	Length
1.	"Oru Murai"	Sudhanesh, Sri Vithya	5:32
2.	"Un Idathil"	Sanggari Krish	4:46
3.	"Thandayuthabaaniye 1.0"	Varmman Elangkovan, Santesh, Amysi	3:39
4.	"Konjam Thirumba Paaradi"	Thaneer Narayanan, Samhita Mira	3:59
5.	"Konjam Thirumbi Paarkiren"	Samhita Mira, Thaneer Narayanan	3:06
6.	"Veyilukkum Kulir"	Sudhanesh	0:54
7.	"Thandayuthabaaniye 2.0"	Varmman Elangkovan, Amysi	3:36
Total length:			25:32

== Box office ==
The film ran for four weeks and grossed RM 401,102.30 ($96,154.89 in 2020) in its first two weeks. The film grossed RM 542,686.60 (US$130,096.41) in its overall run and became the fifth highest-grossing Malaysian Tamil film. The film was the highest-grossing Malaysian Tamil film of 2019.

== See also ==
- List of Malaysian Tamil films
