= Naam Katra Isai =

Naam Katra Isai (When Music Cries)
- Theatrical release poster
- Directed by: Saresh D7
- Written by: Saresh D7
- Produced by: SLY Entertainment; Simplistic Studio
- Starring: Saresh D7; Yuvaraj Krishnasamy; Alvin Martin; Kaameshaa Ravindran; Irfan Zaini
- Production companies: SLY Entertainment; Simplistic Studio
- Distributed by: SLY Entertainment Sdn Bhd
- Release date: 23 November 2023
- Running time: 145 minutes
- Country: Malaysia
- Languages: Tamil, Malay

Naam Katra Isai (transl. The music we learnt) is a 2023 Malaysia Tamil-language drama musical film directed by Saresh D7 in his directorial debut.

Naam Katra Isai was released theatrically on 23 November 2023.

== Plot ==
A young woman sets out on a journey to make her mark in the music industry. Yet, as one artist garners more acclaim than the other, the emergence of fame and ego poses a threat, potentially steering her away from her path.

== Cast ==
- Saresh D7
- Yuvaraj Krishnasamy
- Alvin Martin
- Kaameshaa Ravindran
- Irfan Zaini

== Production ==
The film took around 10 years to be completed as the production team faced several financial issues and COVID-19 pandemic.

== Accolades ==
Year	Award	Category	Recipient(s)	Result	Ref.
2023	Golden Fern Film Awards	Best Asian Movie	Naam Katra Isai	Won	
2023	Golden Fern Film Awards	Best Director	Saresh D7	Won	
2023	Jaisalmer International Film Festival	Best Film Score	Naam Katra Isai	Won	
2023	Jaisalmer International Film Festival	Best Debut Director	Saresh D7	Won	
2023	TEKKA International Film Festival	Best International Film	Naam Katra Isai	Won	
2023	TEKKA International Film Festival	Best Writer	Saresh D7	Won	
2023	TEKKA International Film Festival	Best Director	Saresh D7	Won	
2023	TEKKA International Film Festival	Best Actor	Saresh D7	Won	
2023	TEKKA International Film Festival	Best Supporting Role	Alvin Martin	Won	
2023	TEKKA International Film Festival	Best Editor	Harikrishnan Subramaniam	Won	
2024	33rd Malaysian Film Festival (National Award)	Special Jury Award	Naam Katra Isai	Won	
2024	Nambikkai Star Icon Awards	Popular Movie	Naam Katra Isai	Won	
2024	Nambikkai Star Icon Awards	Popular Director	Saresh D7	Won	
2024	16th Edison Awards	Best Tamil Asian Movie of the Year	Naam Katra Isai	Won	
2024	15th Norway Tamil Film Festival	Best Screenplay Writer	Saresh D7	Won	
2024	15th Norway Tamil Film Festival	Best Actor	Saresh D7	Won	
2024	15th Norway Tamil Film Festival	Best Music Director	Boy Radge	Won	
2024	MICA Awards 3rd Edition	Most Popular Movie	Naam Katra Isai	Won	
2024	MICA Awards 3rd Edition	MICA Icon of The Year	Saresh D7	Won	
2024	MICA Awards 3rd Edition	Best Villain	Irfan Zaini	Won	

== See also ==
- Malaysian Tamil cinema
