= The Farm: En Veettu Thottathil =

- Official poster
- Directed by: Karthik Shamalan
- Written by: Karthik Shamalan
- Produced by: Yugendran
- Starring: Jaya Ganason; Mohanaraj; Mahesan Poobalan; Yugendran Maniam; Haridhass; Yotes; Viknesh Prabu
- Cinematography: V. G. Ravyn Manogaran
- Edited by: Shanker Indra
- Music by: Shameshan Mnai Maran
- Production company: S Cape Imagination
- Distributed by: S Cape Imagination
- Release date: 28 September 2017
- Running time: 127 minutes
- Country: Malaysia
- Language: Tamil

The Farm: En Veettu Thottathil (also known as The Farm: EVT) is a 2017 Malaysian Tamil language dark slasher film directed by Karthik Shamalan. The film consist an ensemble cast of Jaya Ganason—in her feature film debut—alongside Mohanaraj, Mahesan Poobalan, Yugendran Maniam and Haridhass. The film is inspired by popular tale of Red Riding Hood, which gives a dark twist to the story, tells of the painful journey of a girl.

Prior to showing in local cinemas, the movie was screened at film festivals in Puerto Rico, Los Angeles, Mexico and the United Kingdom. The film opened in Malaysia and Singapore cinemas on 28 September 2017.

== Plot ==
Inspired by the popular tale of Red Riding Hood, this Malaysian Tamil slasher film, which gives a dark twist to the story, tells of the painful journey of a girl. The Farm follows a hearing-impaired girl and her encounter with the various kinds of men in her life; one whose nice intentions hide a darker motive, one with bad intentions initially who later repents, and one who abuses women, which the director portrays as ‘an animal’.

== Cast ==
- Jaya Ganason as the deaf-mute girl
- Mohanaraj
- Mahesan Poobalan
- Yugendran Maniam
- Haridhass
- Yotes
- Viknesh Prabu

== Production and marketing ==
The film was shot on a Canon 5D with seven crew members and a shoestring budget. The film was promoted for having "Only 30% Dialogues Throughout The Movie".

== Soundtrack ==
The film's soundtrack is scored by Shameshan Mani Maran.

Tamil (Original)
No.	Title	Lyrics	Singer(s)	Length
1.	"Oli Vizha"	Yuwaji	Prasana	4:57

== Reception ==
Casey Chong of Casey's Movie Mania rated the film 2.5/5 stars and wrote that "Karthik Shamalan's gloomy take on the Red Riding Hood fairy tale is brutal, but [an] uneven B-movie slasher thriller suffered from a bumpy script and inconsistent technical attributes". Ganason's performance was praised by both audiences and critics.

== Accolades ==
Year	Award	Category	Recipient(s)	Result	Ref.
2017	8th Yellow Fever Indie Film Festival	Best Film Gold Award	The Farm: En Veettu Thottathil	Won	
2019	30th Malaysia Film Festival	Most Promising Actress	Jaya Ganason	Won	
2019	Malaysian Tamil Artiste Award	Best Actress	Jaya Ganason	Won	

== Home media ==
The film is available on Astro First until 12 November 2027.
