= Kadhal Sadugudu =

2003 Indian Tamil-language romantic drama film

- DVD cover
- Directed by: V. Z. Durai
- Written by: Balakumaran (Dialogue)
- Screenplay by: V. Z. Durai
- Story by: V. Z. Durai
- Produced by: S. S. Chakravarthy
- Starring: Vikram; Priyanka Trivedi; Prakash Raj; Vivek
- Cinematography: M. S. Prabhu
- Edited by: Suresh Urs
- Music by: Deva
- Production company: NIC Arts
- Release date: 13 April 2003
- Running time: 142 minutes
- Country: India
- Language: Tamil

Kadhal Sadugudu (transl. Love is a game) is a 2003 Indian Tamil-language romantic comedy drama film written and directed by V. Z. Durai and produced by S. S. Chakravarthy. The film stars Vikram, Priyanka Trivedi, Prakash Raj, and Vivek. The music was composed by Deva with cinematography by M. S. Prabhu and editing by Suresh Urs. The film was released on 13 April 2003. The film's title is based on a song from Alai Payuthey (2000).

== Plot ==
Chithambaram is an important man in his village. He is adamant and always sticks to his decisions. When the temple festival starts, Chithambaram's daughter Kausalya goes to her grandfather's house to celebrate. There, she meets Suresh, and they fall in love. Chithambaram gets into many conflicts with Suresh, not even knowing who he is. Everything Suresh does is unintentional, but Chithambaram does not realise this. Therefore, Chithambaram ends up with a very negative opinion of Suresh. One day, everyone in Kausalya's grandfather's home finds out that Suresh and Kausalya are in love, unbeknownst to Chithambaram. On seeing this, they try to get Chithambaram to agree to the wedding. Chithambaram, however, stubbornly sticks to his decision that the marriage should not take place.

Suresh asks Chithambaram what would make him happy, and Chithambaram says that he would be happy if Suresh dies. Realizing that arguing further would be futile, Suresh decides to go back to Madras. Meanwhile, Ilavarasu gets attracted towards Kausalya's physique and begins molesting her. She somehow manages to escape and reports it to her father, but she feels that she is insecure and needs a companion. Kausalya tries to join Suresh at the railway station to go with him, but Suresh refuses, saying that if he marries her, it will be with her father's permission. At that time, Chithambaram arrived at the station to prevent his daughter from eloping with Suresh. He hears this conversation and finally decides to accept Suresh as his daughter's love, and Suresh agrees.

== Cast ==
- Vikram as Suresh
- Priyanka Upendra as Kausalya
- Prakash Raj as Chithambaram
- Vivek as Super Subbu
- Rekha as Kausalya's mother
- Vaishnavi as Suresh's friend
- M. N. Nambiar as Kausalya's grandfather
- Paravai Muniyamma as Subbu's grandmother
- Ilavarasu
- Delhi Ganesh
- Nandhakumar as Saathappan, Subbu's father
- Nalini
- Alphonsa as Carolina
- Muthukaalai
- Cell Murugan as Patient
- Benjamin
- Theni Kunjarammal
- C. R. Vijayakumari
- Kovai Babu as Minor Kunjumani
- Bava Lakshmanan
- Vijay Ganesh
- Kili Ramachandran
- Rani (special appearance in "Sugandhi Sellai")
- Sridhar (special appearance in "Sugandhi Sellai")
- Shobi (special appearance in "Sugandhi Sellai")

== Production ==
The film was developed under the title of Adhisayam, with director V. Z. Durai revealing he insisted on Vikram being cast in the lead role. Meena was initially considered for the lead role, before the producers confirmed Priyanka Trivedi, for whom the project was also meant to mark her Tamil film debut. However, delays meant that two other films released beforehand. The film began its schedules in May 2001, when Vikram had simultaneous shooting schedules for his other films such as Dhill (2001), Kasi (2001), Gemini (2002), Samurai (2002) and King (2002), which were released during late 2001 and mid 2002 respectively, and the schedules continued till September 2002 when the actor was filming his portions for the early 2003 releases such as Dhool (2003) and Saamy (2003), and hence Vikram was seen with those seven looks and get-ups throughout the film.

== Soundtrack ==
Music for the soundtrack was scored by Deva.

| Song title | Singers |
|---|---|
| "Carolinaa" | Tippu, Yugendran |
| "Putham Pudhiyadha" | P. Unnikrishnan, Sadhana Sargam |
| "Megathil Ondrai Nindrom" | Hariharan, Sujatha |
| "Ramshikku Ramshikku" | Harish Raghavendra, Chitra |
| "Sungadhi Shellai" | Tippu, Mano, Pop Shalini |
| "Melisai Thudikudhu" | Tippu, Mano |

== Reception ==
Malathi Rangarajan of The Hindu noted that the film is neither "action packed nor a haunting family drama", adding that time you wish it "were a little more brisk and dynamic". Visual Dasan of Kalki praised the acting of Vikram, Prakash Raj and Priyanka and concluded saying apart from the background music, the songs and lyrics are not memorable, but the magnetic dialogue and direction keep us glued to our seats. Cinesouth wrote, "Within the first few scenes, the audience is able to predict the story and screenplay and the film moves in exactly the same path. This has made the film very weak". Malini Mannath of Chennai Online wrote, "The film moves in bits and pieces [...] One cannot fault Vikram's performance. For an actor of his calibre, the few repetitive expressions he has been given to project, must have been a cake-walk for him. For the character never really gets a chance to exert itself".

Post-release, the film's comedy track by actor Vivek garnered appreciation from critics. The film performed poorly at the box office, coming after several successful films for Vikram during the period. Vikram later claimed that he was taken for a "royal ride" and that the story went through several changes after the initial narration. He also alleged that the producer S. S. Chakravarthy was increasingly loyal to another actor, Ajith Kumar, and was not interested in portraying Vikram in good light.
