= Kalyaanam 2 Kaathal =

Malaysian Tamil-language TV show

- Created by: Karthik Shaamalan
- Starring: Magendran Raman; Yuvaraj Krishnasamy; Malarmeni Perumal; Pashini; Ravin Rao Santheran
- Country of origin: Malaysia
- Original language: Tamil
- No. of seasons: 2

Original release
- Network: Astro Vinmeen
- Release: 2020 – 2022

Kalyaanam 2 Kaathal (transl. Wedding to love) is a 2020-2022 Malaysian Tamil-language romantic drama television series directed by Karthik Shaamalan that streamed on Astro Vinmeen. The series stars Magendran Raman, Yuvaraj Krishnasamy, Malarmeni Perumal, Pashini and Ravin Rao Santheran.

In 2021, the series was renewed for a second season.

== Cast ==
- Magendran Raman as Saminathan, Harish and Bakyanathan
- Yuvaraj Krishnasamy as Harish
- Malarmeni Perumal as Miya
- Pashini as Sowmiya
- Ravin Rao Santheran
- Shashitharan

== Accolades ==
Event	Category	Recipient	Result	Ref.
Ulagam Awards 2022	Popular Lead Female [Series]	Pashini	Won	
Ulagam Awards 2022	Popular Lead Male [Series]	Yuvaraj Krishnasamy	Won	
Ulagam Awards 2022	Popular Series of the Year	Kalyaanam 2 Kaathal	Won	
Ulagam Awards 2022	Popular Actor/Actress in a Supporting Role [Telemovie & Series]	Ravin Rao	Won	
Ulagam Awards 2022	Popular Actor/Actress in a Negative Role [Telemovie & Series]	Shashitharan	Won	
Ulagam Awards 2023	Popular Lead Male (Telemovie/Series)	Yuvaraj Krishnasamy (Note: Also for Vengaiyan Magan and Tittam Pottu Kadathure Koottam.)	Won	
Ulagam Awards 2023	Popular Lead Female (Telemovie/Series)	Dishaaleny Jack, (Note: Also for Virus.) Pashini (Note: Also for Lockdown.)	Nominated	
Ulagam Awards 2023	Popular Actor/Actress in a Negative Role (Telemovie/Series)	Shashitharan	Nominated	
Ulagam Awards 2023	Popular Series of the Year	Kalyaanam 2 Kaathal S2	Won	
Ulagam Awards 2023	Popular OST (Original Soundtrack) of the Year (Telemovie/Series/TV Show)	"Unnaley"	Won	
Ulagam Awards 2023	Best Director (Series)	Karthik Shamalan	Nominated	
Ulagam Awards 2023	Best Cinematography (Telemovie/Series)	Soma Kanthan	Nominated	
Ulagam Awards 2023	Best Visual or Special EFX (Telemovie/Series)	Manoj Kumar Ganapathi	Won	
Ulagam Awards 2023	Best Production Design	Jay Dinesh	Won	
