= Yenni Thuniga =

- Directed by: S.K.Vettri Selvan
- Written by: S.K.Vettri Selvan
- Story by: Suresh Subramanian
- Produced by: Suresh Subramanian
- Starring: Jai; Athulya Ravi
- Cinematography: J.B.Dinesh Kumar
- Edited by: V.J. Sabu joseph
- Music by: Sam CS
- Production company: Rain Of Arrows Entertainment
- Release date: 4 August 2022
- Country: India
- Language: Tamil

Yenni Thuniga (transl. Think well before you dare) is a 2022 Indian Tamil-language action thriller film written and directed by S.K.Vettri Selvan and produced by Suresh Subramanian. The film was produced by Production House Rain Of Arrows Entertainment. The film was distributed by Krikes Cine Creations. The film features Jai and Athulya Ravi in the lead roles while Vamsi Krishna was cast as the main antagonist and Sunil Reddy also appears in a negative role as a politician. The film's music is composed by Sam CS with cinematography handled by J. B. Dinesh Kumar and editing done by V. J. Sabu Joseph. The film was released theatrically on 4 August 2022.

== Plot ==
After a heist job by Madhan and his gang, to rob a precious cargo, became a mess, he was under pressure to deliver the loot to the overlords. Things begin to get complicated when Kathir appears, disrupts Madhan’s plan and reveals what happened that day.

== Cast ==
- Jai as Kathir
- Athulya Ravi as Narmada
- Anjali Nair as a victim's wife
- Krissh Karthick as Justin
- Vamsi Krishna as Madhan
- Vidya Pradeep as Teja
- Marimuthu as Kathir's father
- Sunil Reddy as 'Needhi' Manikkam
- Kuraishi as Saravanan
- Munnar Ramesh
- Abhishek Shankar as Doctor
- Suresh Subramanian as Sam
- Kimberly Ziler as Naomi
- Maurice Johnson as Joe
- Jayce Venditti as Gabe

== Production ==
On 11 December 2019 Vetrimaaran revealed the official title of the film. On 22 February 2021, AR Murugadoss unveiled the first look poster of the film.

== Music ==
The film's soundtrack was composed by Sam CS. The first single was released on 15 December 2021.

Track listing
No.	Title	Lyrics	Singer(s)	Length
1.	"Yenadi Penne"	Sam CS	Abhijith Rao	4:07
2.	"Yennadiye Yennadiye"	Karthik Netha	Haricharan, Srinisha Jayaseelan	4:25

The movie theme song "Yenni Thuniga", a metal track was composed by producer Suresh Subramanian. Sung by Super Singer fame Divagar, Suresh Subramanian, Arsan Suresh, Rapper Hyde Karthy, written by Senthamizh, and recorded in Los Angeles and Chennai, this song was used in the movie's rolling credits at the end.

== Release ==
The film was released theatrically on 4 August 2022.

== Reception ==
M. Suganth of The Times of India gave the film 1.5 out of 5 stars stating that "Only a couple of plot developments make us sit up. One involves the interval twist, which plays with the expectations that non-linear narratives have built in us and another about the mystery of the missing diamonds. But for the rest of the time, the film gets us close to a state of stupor, making us wonder if the title is a fair warning to us, audiences." Avinash Ramachandran of Cinema Express gave 3 out of 5 stars and stated that "Now, we just have a handful of names doing the rounds, and if Jai’s recent filmography is anything to go by, then he seems to have become calculative and has bravely taken to this course." Chennai Vision gave the film’s rating 3.2 out of 5, stating that "Sam CS makes a mark with his BGM and rest of the technical aspects are good." Thangaraja Palaniappan of News Bricks after reviewing the film stated that "Jai has showcased himself in good action roles more than as a romantic hero."
