= Thalainagaram 2 =

2023 Indian film

- Theatrical release poster
- Directed by: V. Z. Durai
- Written by: V. Z. Durai
- Produced by: S. M. Prabakaran; V. Z. Durai; Madhuraj
- Dialogue by: Maniji
- Starring: Sundar C; Pallak Lalwani
- Cinematography: E. Krishnasamy
- Edited by: R. Sudharsan
- Music by: Ghibran
- Production company: Right Eye Theatres
- Release date: 23 June 2023
- Country: India
- Language: Tamil

Thalainagaram 2 (transl. Capital city 2) is a 2023 Indian Tamil-language action thriller film written and directed by V. Z. Durai. It stars Sundar C and Pallak Lalwani with Thambi Ramaiah, Prabhakar, Aayira, Jaise Jose, Vishal Rajan and Seran Raj in supporting roles.

The film is a standalone sequel to the 2006 film Thalainagaram.

== Plot ==
Three deadly crime bosses, namely Nanjunda, Vamsi, and Maaran, exert control over different areas of Chennai. Maaran holds sway over North Chennai, Nanjunda dominates South Chennai, and Vamsi reigns supreme in Central Chennai. These individuals ascended to power through heinous means, resorting to acts of violence, including murder. By smuggling spirits into the country and killing the local councillor, Nanjunda expanded his empire, using his men to burn the bodies of his victims. Vamsi amassed a fortune through his betting business after killing his jewellery shop boss and the boss's wife. Maaran smuggled harbour goods and used women to gain control of the officers in the harbour. He didn't hesitate to eliminate an officer who posed a threat by gathering evidence against him.

In an unexpected turn of events, Nanjunda's men kidnap Sithara, Vamsi's girlfriend, and Nanjunda sexually assaults her. Nanjunda's lawyer plans to rope a former gangster, Right, to help Nanjunda gain control over Chennai. Right violently beats up Nanjunda's men within 17 seconds after they kidnap his dog. Right reformed after committing a daylight murder a few years back and now runs a real estate trading business with Malik Bhai. After CIBCID arrests Malik Bhai in a counterfeit notes case, Right discovers that Meiyappan, Maaran's right-hand man, is behind the fake notes. Right indirectly warns Meiyappan, leading Meiyappan to plan Right's murder at his home. However, Right cleverly fights Meiyappan's goons, injuring Meiyappan and warning Maaran through Meiyappan's phone.

CIBCID remands Meiyappan on the counterfeit case and releases Malik Bhai. Just after Right and Malik Bhai come out of the CIBCID office, Vamsi's men slash Malik Bhai's arm. Right decides to warn Vamsi. Sithara eventually falls in love with Right because of his righteous manner, and Malik Bhai heals from his injuries. Sithara visits Right and tells him about her incident; Vamsi finds out about Sithara's meeting with Right.

Nanjunda decides to finish off Right after Right beats up his men. Nanjunda's boys kidnap Parveen, and they force Parveen to reveal Right's hideout to them. Nanjunda's gang traps Right, and Nanjunda stabs Right 17 times, leaving him on ventilator support. Right eventually heals with Sithara's help. Maaran and his women decide to visit the Public Prosecutor to kill Right because he interfered in Maaran's business. However, the Public Prosecutor and Meiyappan smartly executed Maaran under Vamsi's order. Meiyappan informs Vamsi about Maaran's death, and Vamsi agrees to clear Meiyappan's case. Vamsi deviously frames Sithara for prostitution, and Sithara agrees to bring Right to Vamsi to protect her reputation and career. However, Right murders Vamsi's men. He kidnaps Vamsi onto a boat, and Right's goons brutally mutilate him in the middle of the sea and throw his body into the sea. Right's men then attack Nanjunda's six boys and kidnap them to a secluded forest. Sithara arrives and identifies them as the goons who physically abused her. Right's men then bury the six boys, killing them and getting Sithara her justice.

Nanjunda is hell-bent on killing Right after the murder of his boys. Sithara takes Right to her private farmhouse. Malik Bhai tells Right he will pick up Parveen and visit him. Parveen comes to Sithara's farmhouse, but Sithara and Right realise that Malik Bhai is missing. After ringing his phone, they discover his sandals, watch and ashes. Right goes to Nanjunda's house, grabs the sword from behind his chair, and brutally beheads Nanjunda, making all his goons tremble in fear.

== Cast ==
- Sundar C as Right
- Pallak Lalwani as Sithara
- Thambi Ramaiah as Malik Bhai
- Prabhakar as Nanjunda
- Ayraa as Parveen
- Jaise Jose as Maaran
- Vishal Rajan as Vamsi
- Cheran Raj as Selvam
- V. Z. Durai as Public Prosecutor (Advocate)
- Vijay Sathya as Meiyappan
- Augustin Aaju as Augustin

== Production ==
The film was produced by S. M. Prabakaran and V. Z. Durai under the banner of Right Eye Theatres, while it was co-produced by Madhuraj. The cinematography was done by E. Krishnasamy, while editing was handled by R. Sudharsan. The production of the film started on 23 September 2021. This film is the second collaboration between Sundar C and V. Z. Durai after Iruttu. The film was shot in Chennai. The shooting of the film wrapped up on 27 June 2022.

== Music ==
Thalainagaram 2

Soundtrack album by Ghibran
- Released: 2023
- Recorded: 2023
- Genre: Feature film soundtrack
- Language: Tamil
- Label: Saregama Tamil
- Producer: Ghibran

Ghibran chronology
Hunt (2023)	Thalainagaram 2 (2023)	80s Buildup (2023)

The music of the film was composed by Ghibran.

Track listing
No.	Title	Lyrics	Singer(s)	Length
1.	"Asathura Asathura"	Mohan Rajan	Yazin Nizar, Padmalatha	4:52
Total length:				4:52

== Release ==
The film was released on 23 June 2023.

=== Home media ===
The film was also premiered on Amazon Prime Video.

== Reception ==
=== Critical response ===
Logesh Balachandran of The Times of India gave 2 out of 5 stars and wrote, "Thalainagaram 2 could have been better if the team had worked a bit on the conflicts and the way things unfolded." Vikatan gave the film a mixed review, noting it was an outdated gangster revenge story. Pachi Avudayappan of ABP Nadu gave 2.5 out of 5 stars and wrote "It can be said that all the actors except Sundar C have played their characters perfectly" A critic from Dinamalar gave it 2.25 out of 5 stars and wrote, "The climax was predictable."

Navein Darshan of Cinema Express gave 2 out of 5 stars and wrote "Sundar C, the actor who took a little long to return to the Thalainagaram universe and without the right writing, playing Right isn't possibly the right move at the moment. " Dina Thanthi wrote that the ending of the story is predictable but the lively screenplay makes it forgettable. Hindu Tamil Thisai gave 3 out of 5 stars and stated that although the characters, their problems, the dice game they play to get their way and settle the blame are interestingly depicted. Raghav Kumar of Kalki Online wrote that the lack of comedy like the first film is a minus and added that although there are few sentimental scenes, Thalainagaram 2 has become a film that justifies violence beyond this. Thinaboomi wrote that the second part is about the same as the first part as usually the police related scenes and attitude are weak. and added that however, director VZ Durai's work is unexpected at many places and the film captivates the audience. Ananda Vikatan gave a mixed review.
