= Sunil Reddy =

Indian actor

- Born: Sunil Reddy; 25 July 1974 (age 52); Nellore, Andhra Pradesh, India
- Occupation: Actor
- Years active: 2018-present
- Relatives: Kodandarami Reddy (father); Vaibhav (brother)

Sunil Reddy (born 25 July 1974) is an Indian actor who works in Tamil cinema. He is known for his role as Mahaali in Doctor (2021) and has become a regular in Nelson's films.

== Career ==
Sunil worked as a presenter for his younger brother Vaibhav Reddy's Telugu films directed or produced by his father A. Kodandarami Reddy such as Godava (2007) and Kasko (2009).

Balaji Tharaneetharan was looking for an actor to play the antagonist in Seethakaathi (2018) and zeroed in on Sunil after meeting him at a birthday party by one of the producer's partners. Tharaneetharan found Sunil's acting rigid and asked him to enroll in an acting class for a few weeks. Regarding his performance in the film, a critic wrote that "debutant Sunil was equally impressive in the latter portions" and added that "The shot involving Sunil complaining at Tamil Film Producers Council about his film being sabotaged is a scream".

After being impressed with his performance in Seethakathi (2018), Lokesh Kanagaraj cast him in Master (2021), and Sunil joined the sets of the film in Delhi in November 2019. He played a petty criminal called Mahaali in Nelson's Doctor (2021), which garnered him recognition. He later acted in Beast (reprising his role from Doctor) and Jailer, two more films directed by Nelson.

== Filmography ==
| Year | Film | Role | Notes | Ref. |
|---|---|---|---|---|
| 2018 | Seethakaathi | Dhanapal | | |
| 2021 | Master | Education Minister | | |
| 2021 | Annabelle Sethupathi | Rudra's brother | | |
| 2021 | Doctor | Mahaali | | |
| 2022 | Beast | Mahaali | | |
| 2022 | Yenni Thuniga | 'Needhi' Manikkam | | |
| 2023 | Soppana Sundari | Inspector Kannan | | |
| 2023 | Maamannan | Shanmugavel | | |
| 2023 | Jailer | Bagunnara Balu | | |
| 2024 | Ranam Aram Thavarel | Drunkard | | |
| 2024 | Double Tuckerr | Rocker Reddy | | |
| 2024 | Adharma Kadhaigal | Dinesh | | |
| 2025 | Perusu | Saamikannu | | |
| 2025 | Chennai City Gangsters | Kudi Kumar | | |
| 2025 | Kishkindhapuri | Surendhar | Telugu film debut | |
| 2026 | Couple Friendly | Raghu | Telugu film | |
| 2026 | Love Insurance Kompany | Rajeev | | |
| 2026 | Vishwanath & Sons | Advocate Ramalingam | | |
