= Nepali (film) =

- Poster
- Directed by: V. Z. Durai
- Written by: Pattukkottai Prabakar (dialogue)
- Screenplay by: V. Z. Durai
- Story by: V. Z. Durai
- Produced by: Rama Saravanan
- Starring: Bharath; Govind Namdev; Meera Jasmine
- Cinematography: R. Madhi
- Edited by: Mathan Gunadeva
- Music by: Srikanth Deva
- Production company: OST Films
- Release date: 11 April 2008
- Country: India
- Language: Tamil

Nepali is a 2008 Indian Tamil-language neo-noir action thriller film written and directed by V. Z. Durai and produced by Rama Saravanan. The film stars Bharath and Meera Jasmine in the lead roles, while Govind Namdev and Prem play supporting roles and Sangeetha features in a guest appearance. It marks Namdev's Tamil debut. It has music by Srikanth Deva, cinematography by R. Madhi and editing by Mathan Gunadeva. The film was released on 10 April 2008.

== Plot ==
Nepali works in a supermarket. He suddenly kills a few people and leaves a clue along with the dead bodies. DCP Gautham takes charge of the case. He tries to analyse the clues left behind by the murderer to find a solution to the case.

Karthik is a software engineer who leads a joyful life, enjoying himself with his friends. One day, he meets Priya in a showroom and immediately develops an attraction towards her. Priya also likes Karthik’s charming character, and they both fall in love. Meanwhile, there is a depressed convict who has been jailed for some crime. The convict often tries to end his life by committing suicide but is saved by the jailer, and the police beats him for his activities.

Gautham cracks the clue left by Nepali and guesses his next move of murdering a person. Gautham gets close to the murderer, but he escapes after murdering his target. Karthik and Priya decide to marry, although Priya’s parents are not interested in this alliance. Nevertheless, both marry and lead a life together. Suddenly, Priya’s parents register a complaint against Karthik, accusing him of kidnapping their daughter. Corrupt ACP Ashok inquires about the case and realizes that Karthik and Priya are true lovers.

Ashok gets attracted to Priya and decides to have an illicit affair with her. Priya understands his motive and decides to stay away from him. Priya tells Karthik, which angers him, and he goes to meet Ashok. When Karthik is away, Ashok comes to Priya’s home and tries to rape her. To save herself, Priya commits suicide. Karthik gets furious upon seeing this; he kills Ashok and is then jailed.

Although the film shows three parallel stories, it is revealed to the audience that all three characters are the same person. The depressed convict is none other than Karthik. He decides to end his life many times in jail as he does not want to lead a life without his wife Priya, but gets saved by the jailer and other policemen. In jail, Karthik meets a Nepali, who has been arrested for speaking out against female harassment. The jailer, along with a few other policemen, kills the Nepali as per some big shot’s order, and they divert the case by mentioning that the Nepali had committed suicide.

Karthik decides to get into the identity of Nepali and continue his activities. He escapes from jail, changes his looks to resemble a Nepali, and starts to kill people who molest girls. Gautham finds out that a Nepali is responsible for all the murders and warns him to surrender, which he refuses. Karthik is on his way to kill his next target, but Gautham spots him. A chase occurs, followed by the two fighting in an underground parking area.

Suddenly, a gunshot is heard, and Karthik runs out of the parking area. However, he is shocked to see the images of Priya and the Nepali in front of him. Karthik is confused and turns back to where he sees Gautham coming alive, along with Karthik's dead body. It is revealed that Gautham shot Karthik (the gunshot heard was from Gautham), and Karthik’s soul has run out. It meets the souls of Priya and the Nepali and reunites with them in heaven.

== Cast ==
- Bharath as Karthik alias Bharathan (Nepali)
- Meera Jasmine as Priya (Voice dubbed by Savitha Reddy)
- Govind Namdev as Nepali
- Prem as DCP Gautham IPS (Voice dubbed by K. P. Sekar)
- Sangeetha as a program's host (Guest appearance)
- Raja Ravindra as ACP Ashok IPS (Voice dubbed by K. P. Sekar)
- Meera Krishnan as Priya's mother
- Boys Rajan as Priya's father
- Ganeshkar as Moorthi
- Mayilsamy as Priya's relative
- Munnar Ramesh as Police Officer
- Aryan as Corrupt Doctor (Guest appearance)

== Production ==
The lead role of the film was initially offered to Jiiva, but Bharath replaced him.

== Controversy ==
The film elicited controversy for allegedly depicting the Tamil Nadu police in poor light.

== Soundtrack ==
The soundtrack was composed by Srikanth Deva. In an audio review, Pavithra Srinivasan of Rediff.com rated the soundtrack three out of five and wrote that "All in all, a youthful and fizzy album from Srikanth Deva".

Song	Singers	Lyrics
"Anaikindra Dhaagam"	Karthik, Bombay Jayashree, Suchitra	Yugabharathi
"Wanna Become A Lady Bomb"	Sunitha Sarathy, Megha	Karthik Netha
"Hey You Wow"	Tanvi Shah, Siva	Vijay Sagar
"Kanavile Kanavile"	Sathyan, Krish, Shweta Mohan	Yugabharathi
"Suthudhe Suthudhe"	Yugendran, Vijay	Karthik Netha
"The Word of Nepali"	Instrumental	—N/a
"Love In"	Instrumental	—N/a
"Sound of Action"	Instrumental	—N/a

== Critical reception ==
Sify wrote, "Dorai has been successful in confusing the viewer with three parallel episodes which gets a bit annoying after a while before he reaches the conclusion in the climax. The major fault with Nepali is that it is one of those movies that should never have been made, as it is a stale old vigilante story with an overdose of violence, blood and gore". Pavithra Srinivasan of Rediff.com wrote, "Nepali is quick, fast, racy and new -- with just a few bumps along the road. On the whole, though, it makes a fairly good show". Malathi Rangarajan of The Hindu wrote, "The novelty in narration, though confusing at times, is a striking feature of this OST Films' production".
