= Karthik Shaamalan =

Malaysian filmmaker

- Born: 8 November 1986 (age 39); Taiping, Malaysia
- Occupation: Director
- Years active: 2013-present
- Height: 5 ft 11 in (180 cm)

Karthik Shaamalan is a Malaysian Tamil film director. He made his debut with the movie Melle Tiranthathu Kathavu before getting well known for directing Malaysian Tamil films like The Farm: En Veettu Thottathil and Adai Mazhai Kaalam. The series that he directed for Astro Vinmeen HD was Kalyaanam 2 Kaathal.

== Filmography ==
=== Films ===
Year	Title	Notes
2013	Melle Thirantathu Kathavu	
2018	Atcham Thavir	
2018	The Farm: En Veettu Thottathil	
2018	Sughamaai Subbulakshmi	
2023	Adai Mazhai Kaalam	Also cinematographer
2024	C4 Cinta	

=== Television ===
Year	Title	Channel	Notes
2015	Manggalyam Tanthunanena	Astro Vinmeen HD	Television film
2020	Kalvanai Kandupidi	Astro Vinmeen HD	
2020–2021	Kalyaanam 2 Kaathal	Astro Vinmeen HD	
2021	Naran	Astro Vinmeen HD	Television film

== Awards and nominations ==
=== Awards ===
- Norway Tamil Film Festival Awards for Best Director (Sughamaai Subbulakshmi)
- Ulagam Awards for Best Script (Naran)
- Ulagam Awards 2022 for Popular Series of the Year (Kalyaanam 2 Kadhal Season 1)
- Toronto Tamil Film Festival award for Best Emerging Director (Adai Mazhai Kaalam)
- Norway Tamil Film Festival Award for Best Cinematography (Adai Mazhai Kaalam)
- LA Film Festival for Best Indie Feature (Adai Mazhai Kaalam)

=== Nominations ===
- Ulagam Awards 2023 for Best Director (Series) for (Kalyaanam 2 Kadhal Season 2)
