= Kadhal Kan Kattudhe =

2017 Indian film by Shivaraj

- Poster
- Directed by: Shivaraj
- Written by: Shivaraj
- Produced by: Deva; Shivaraj
- Starring: KG; Athulya; Aneeruth
- Cinematography: Shivaraj
- Edited by: Shivaraj
- Music by: Pavan
- Production company: Kovai Film Mates
- Distributed by: Montage Media Productions - Sumee Baskaran
- Release date: 17 February 2017
- Country: India
- Language: Tamil

Kadhal Kan Kattudhe (transl. Love is Dazzling) is a 2017 Indian Tamil-language romance film written, co-produced and directed by Shivaraj. Featuring newcomers KG, Athulya and Aneeruth in the lead roles, the music was composed by Pavan. The film began production during early 2016 and was released on 17 February 2017. The film's title is based on a song from Kaaki Sattai (2015).

== Cast ==
- Varun KG as Shiva
- Athulya as Athulya
- Aneeruth as Karthik
- Ivan Dharms
- Karthika
- Bharathi Krishnan
- Shankar
- Muralidharan
- Indhumathi

== Production ==
Featuring a cast and crew newcomers, the film was planned by Shivaraj, who is credited in the film as the writer, director, co-producer, editor and cinematographer, while also portraying a supporting role. The team primarily shot the film across Coimbatore, Pollachi and Ooty. Prior to release, the film won regional awards conducted by local colleges in Coimbatore. To perfect the screenplay, Shivaraj showed the film to film institute students in Chennai to get their feedback.

== Soundtrack ==
Kadhal Kan Kattudhe

Soundtrack album by Pavan
- Released: 24 November 2016
- Recorded: 2016
- Language: Tamil
- Label: Trend Music
- Producer: Pavan

The film's music was composed by Pavan, while the audio rights of the film was acquired by Trend Music. The album released on 24 November 2016 and featured five songs.

Track list
| No. | Title | Lyrics | Singer(s) | Length |
|---|---|---|---|---|
| 1. | "Unn Kanavukal" | Mohanraja | Bobo Shashi | 4:19 |
| 2. | "Unn Kanavukal" | Mohanraja | Madhumitha, Ajitha | 2:35 |
| 3. | "Kadhale" | Mohanraja | Karthik | 4:55 |
| 4. | "Naan Pogum" | Mohanraja | Naresh Iyer, Jananie SV | 3:55 |
| 5. | "Nee Illa" | Mohanraja | Jananie SV | 5:06 |

== Release ==
The film opened on 17 February 2017 to coincide with the Valentine's Day weekend. The Times of India wrote "it’s always a pleasant surprise when a small film manages to punch above its weight", adding that "this refreshing little romance does this in an impressive manner, even while ticking all the genre indispensables". Likewise, a reviewer from the Deccan Chronicle wrote "though Kadhal Kan Kattuthe is the usual romance, breakup, reunion story, what makes it tick is its lively presentation combined with well-written dialogues and appreciable performances from a new set of actors", concluding that overall it was "a cool and breezy film that is worth a watch". Sify.com stated "it is watchable for the honest attempt but the execution could've been much better" adding "the biggest strength and minus of Kadhal Kan Kattuthe’s is its casting". The reviewer added that "despite the usual triangular love story and sulk between the lead pair, the newcomers provide a fresh feel but after a point of time, we get tired due to their raw performances while the plodding romance and long drawn out climax in the second half test our patience". The film took a low profile opening, but eventually out ran bigger profile films Ennodu Vilayadu and Pagadi Aattam at the Chennai box office.
