= Dharmaprabhu =

Film by Muthukumaran

- Film poster
- Directed by: Muthukumaran
- Written by: Muthukumaran
- Produced by: P Ranganathan
- Starring: Yogi Babu; Radha Ravi; Rekha; Sam Jones; Ramesh Thilak; Rajendran
- Cinematography: Mahesh Muthuswami
- Edited by: San Lokesh
- Music by: Justin Prabhakaran
- Production company: Sri Vaari Films
- Release date: 28 June 2019
- Running time: 135 minutes
- Country: India
- Language: Tamil

Dharmaprabhu is a 2019 Indian Tamil language fantasy comedy film written and directed by Muthukumaran. Yogi Babu plays the lead role in the film, and supporting roles are done by Radha Ravi, Sam Jones, Ramesh Thilak, Rekha and Rajendran among others. Justin Prabhakaran composed the music for the film, editing was done by San Lokesh, and cinematography was by Mahesh Muthuswamy.

== Plot ==
In the world beyond the earth & in the deep void of space, the God of Death, Yeman Sr. (Radha Ravi) plans on retiring after his long reign in the Yemalogam. On one side, after hearing of this, Yeman's Chitragupta (Ramesh Thilak) is scheming to be the next Yeman. But, to his disappointment, Yeman Sr. makes his son (Yogi Babu) the next Yeman, in accordance of his lineage.

Yeman Sr.'s son, is shown to be a 5th grader, who is mostly a comedian in his class & doesn't care at all about studies. When the news is passed to him that he is to be his father, Yeman Sr's successor, he argues with his parents, his father Yeman Sr. & his mother Ayyo, about him not wanting to become Yeman. However, his parents convinces him & so, for his parents' sake, he is crowned as the king of the, which enrages Chitragupta, as his dreams have now become vain.

Because of his desire for the throne, he tries to dethrone Yeman Jr. by all means possible. After many attempts, Chitragupta makes Yeman Jr. make a mistake by saving a young girl from a lorry accident & preventing the death of a corrupt caste politician Kumaradasan. Shiva Peruman (Rajendran) is exasperated because of Yeman Jr.'s actions & he swallows his father, Yeman Sr. & announces to Yeman Jr. that he has 7 days to reform his mistakes & to kill Kumaradasan, or else, Shiva will destroy the Yemalogam.

Even with Yeman Jr.'s 1+1 plan, given to him by 4 distinguished men, will he be able to rectify his past mistakes, kill the politician madman & save the entire Yemalogam, forms the crux of the story?

== Cast ==
- Yogi Babu as Dharma Prabhu
- Radha Ravi as Yaman
- Sam Jones as Bala
- Ramesh Thilak as Chitragupta
- Rajendran as Shiva
- Rekha as Ayyo
- Meghna Naidu cameo appearance
- Azhagam Perumal as Kumaradasan the Politician
- Bose Venkat as Minister
- Bosskey as "Kho" Rangasamy
- Shanmugam Muthusamy as Yama Guru
- Supergood Subramani
- P. V. Chandramouli
- Ashvin Raja as Cameo appearance
- Janani as Vaishnavi, Politician Kumaradasan's daughter

== Production ==
This film shooting was held in a fictional place due to the cast and the story. Yaman stays in place called Yamaloka, so the art works were done mostly in a fictional way. The first look poster of Dharmaprabhu was released on 2 November, where Yogi Babu stands as Yaman with the weapon Gada. The film shooting was a short time of period and the movie features was released soon. The film was shot in Chennai and the songs were composed abroad. One of the first look poster reminds one of Thambi Ramiah’s directorial film Indiralohathil Na Azhagappan.

== Soundtrack ==
Soundtrack was composed by Justin Prabhakaran.

- "Oorar Unna" - Tm Selvakumar
- "Usurula Ethayo" - Yogi Sekar, Aishwarya Ravichandran
- "Katta Karuppa" - Acs Ravichandran, Ranina Reddy

== Reception ==
Times of India wrote "The plot had enough scope for making it a wholesome entertainer, but one needs to watch the movie to know how it has been badly wasted." Cinema Express wrote "Dharma Prabhu quite needlessly takes on the mantle of messaging. It appears even narakalokam isn’t immune to the rampant disease of posturing." Sify wrote "Apart from Imsai Arasan 23am Pulikecei, none of the Tamil fantasy comedies have clicked in Tamil mainly because of shoddy writing and execution. Leading comedy actor Yogi Babu’s Dharmaprabhu in which he plays the lead title role is another addition to the genre, which disappoints."
