= V. Z. Durai =

Indian film director

- Occupation: Film director
- Years active: 2000–present
- Known for: Right Eye Theatres

V. Z. Durai (also credited as Dhorai VZ) is an Indian film director, producer, actor, and advertising filmmaker who works primarily in the Tamil film industry. He is known for directing the blockbuster debut Mugavaree (2000), the cult classic gangster film Thotti Jaya (2005), and the successful horror-thriller Iruttu (2019). He also founded the production company Right Eye Theatres and the advertising firm Addlime.

== Film career ==
=== 2000–2010 : Debut and breakthrough ===
Durai made his directorial debut with Mugavaree (2000), produced by S. S. Chakravarthy and starring Ajith Kumar and Jyothika. Despite having no prior film experience, Durai received significant production support from Chakravarthy. The film was a commercial success, running for over 100 days in cinemas. Ajith Kumar gifted Durai a car as a token of appreciation before the film's release. The film won the Tamil Nadu State Film Award for Best Family Film and was nominated for the National Film Award for Best Debut Director.

The success of the film led to the Durai and Kumar to make another film together featuring co-stars R. Madhavan and Vikram. However, they later scrapped and dropped the film.

In 2003, he directed Kadhal Sadugudu featuring Vikram and Priyanka Trivedi. While not a major commercial success, it remains a notable entry in his filmography.

In 2005, Durai directed Thotti Jaya, a gangster film starring Silambarasan and Gopika. The film became a blockbuster and later attained cult classic status, with fans and media celebrating it even 15 years after release. It marked Silambarasan's first gangster role. A sequel to this is much anticipated.

His fourth directorial venture, Nepali (2008), starred Bharath and Meera Jasmine. Critics noted it was a stylistic departure from his earlier work; it received mixed reviews but performed well at the box office.

=== 2010–2019 : Hiatus, experimental films, and comeback ===
After Nepali, Durai took a five-year hiatus from directing feature films, during which he focused on international advertising campaigns and construction projects.

He returned in 2013 with 6 Candles (stylized as *6*), starring Shaam and Poonam Kaur. Shaam reportedly went without sleep for days during filming. The film received praise from directors like Bala, who honoured Durai with a gold chain, and Kannada actor Sudeep Sanjeev, who praised both Shaam and Durai for their excellent work. It won two Ananda Vikatan Cinema Awards (Best Story, Best Villain) and was nominated for the National Film Award for Best Film.

After another five-year hiatus, he directed Yemaali (2018), an experimental drama starring Samuthirakani and Roshini. The film received mixed reviews but showcased his willingness to experiment.

In 2019, he directed the horror-thriller Iruttu starring Sundar C and Sakshi Chaudhary. The film was a commercial success, completing 50 days in theatres and being praised for its investigative horror elements. The film was a break for Sundar C.

=== 2020–present: Production house and sequels ===
Durai founded his own production company, Right Eye Theatres, and began developing franchise sequels. He directed and produced Thalainagaram 2 (2022), a sequel to the 2006 hit Thalainagaram, starring Sundar C and Palak Lalwani.

He also completed Narkaali (2024), starring actor-director Ameer, which faced delays in release.

As of 2024, Durai is attached to direct Thotti Jaya 2, the long-awaited sequel to his 2005 cult classic Thotti Jaya, with Silambarasan reprising his role. The film's music is composed by Santhosh Narayanan, with cinematography by E. Krishnasamy and editing by R. Sudharsan.

== Advertising and other work ==
Durai founded Addlime, an advertising film company through which he directed international commercials in Dubai, Ukraine, Thailand, and London. In London, he directed corporate films for Medican Medical Cannabis. He and his wife have collaborated on advertisements for The Chennai Silks, City Union Bank, and BharatMatrimony.

Prior to full-time filmmaking, he worked in construction management, including luxury resort projects for Taj Hotels in the Maldives.

== Filmography ==
=== As director ===
List of Films
Year	Title	Notes	Ref.
2000	Mugavaree	Also cameo appearance; Tamil Nadu State Film Award for Best Family Film	
2003	Kadhal Sadugudu		
2005	Thotti Jaya	Also cameo appearance; cult classic	
2008	Nepali	Also cameo appearance	
2013	6	Also known as *6*; 2 Ananda Vikatan Awards; National Award nominee	
2018	Yemaali		
2019	Iruttu	Also cameo appearance; commercial success	
2022	Thalainagaram 2	Also actor and producer	
2024	Narkaali	Also actor	
TBA	Thotti Jaya 2	Announced; with Silambarasan, music by Santhosh Narayanan	

== Accolades ==
Awards and nominations received by V. Z. Durai
Year	Award	Category	Film	Result	Ref.
2000	National Film Awards	Best Debut Director	Mugavaree	Nominated	
2000	Tamil Nadu State Film Awards	Best Family film	Mugavaree	Won	
2013	National Film Awards	Best Film	6	Nominated	
2013	Ananda Vikatan Cinema Awards	Best Story	6	Won	

=== Honours ===
- NIC Arts Production House for Excellence Commercial Success;– Honoured for Mugavaree (2000)
