= Aiman Hakim Ridza =

Malaysian singer and actor

- ايمان حکيم رضا
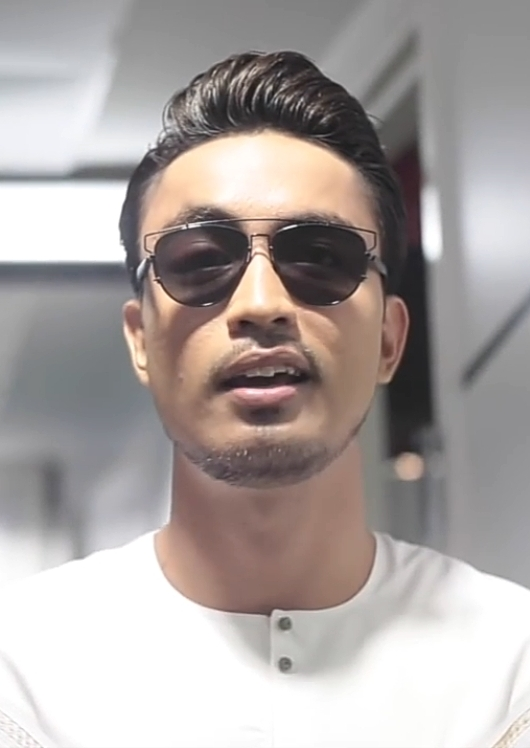
- Aiman Hakim in 2016.
- Born: Aiman Hakim bin Ridza Abdoh; 17 January 1989 (age 37); Johor Bahru, Johor, Malaysia
- Education: ACCA
- Occupations: Celebrity; Singer; Model; Brand ambassador
- Years active: 2011–present
- Spouse: Zahirah MacWilson (m. 2020)
- Sports career
- Years active: 2001–present
- Country: Malaysia
- Sport: Football
- Musical career
- Genre: Pop
- Instrument: Vocal

Aiman Hakim bin Ridza Abdoh (born 17 January 1989) is a Malaysian actor. He rose to fame in Malaysian entertainment showbiz when he became a contestant of the TV3's reality television series, Mentor Season 5 and best known for his role in hit television series Vanila Coklat, and became best known for his leading roles in Diandra, Projek Memikat Suami, Selamat Pengantin Madu, Isteri Separuh Masa, Urusan Hati Cik Drama Queen and Girlfriend Aku Dari Neraka The Series.

== Early life ==
Aiman was born on 17 January 1989, in Johor Bahru, Johor, Malaysia. He is the third of four siblings and has a mixed Malay-Arab parentage, his father is Malay and mother is Arab. He lived in Johor until 1990, then moved to Penang in 1994 before he settled in the Shah Alam and Subang Jaya. He attended SS 17 Subang Jaya Primary School at primary level, then he continued his studies at Subang Utama High School and now he already graduated from Sunway College, majoring in accounting, Association of Chartered Certified Accountants (ACCA). Before debuting as an actor and singer, he was a part-time model. He has been involved in advertising such as Brylcreem, Celcom, Milo and McDonald's. He was also appointed as the brand ambassador and model for Garnier Men in 2014.

== Career ==
=== Career as footballer ===
Prior to his showbiz career, Aiman began his early career in sports as a footballer. He used to be the team captain of Primary Schools Football Championship Malaysia representing Selangor in 2001 when he was 12 years old.

Between 2004 and 2005, he played football to representing Malaysia in AFC U-17 Championship at Tokyo, Japan. He also became the representative of Malaysia in various international football competition (under 17) at Jakarta, Indonesia; Bangkok, Thailand; Hong Kong and others. His former teammates including Bunyamin Omar and Asrarudin Putra Omar who later have professional football career with the national team and Selangor.

=== Career as singer and actor ===
In 2011, Aiman became a participant in the singing competition Mentor organised by TV3 for its fifth season under the guidance of Rahim Maarof, influential singers and musicians in Malaysia. Aiman made it through to the fourth round before being eliminated.

==== Mentor performances ====
Week	Instructed songs	Original artist	Result #
Introduction	"Kau dan Aku"	Aizat Amdan	-
1	"Kesedaran" "Lizawati" (with Rahim Maarof)	Gaya Zakry; Rahim Maarof	4
2	"Ekstravaganza" "Larut" "ACKKC" "Holy Diver" "Malam Ku Bermimpi" (with Ratnah) "Mercy" (with Ratnah) "Aku dan Dirimu" (with Shiha)	Bunkface; Dewa 19; Rahim Maarof; Killswitch Engage; Saloma; Duffy; Ari Lasso and Bunga Citra Lestari	5
3	"Noktah Cinta" "Kau Ratnaku" (with Roy)	Hafiz; Roy	5
4	"I'll Be" "Sesuatu Janji"	Edwin McCain; Taufik Batisah	Eliminated

Aiman's first drama, Vanila Coklat, which aired on TV3 in 2011, brought him back to the public's attention. After the drama ended, he acted in a few television series and a telemovie drama.

In 2012, he produced a single called "Khalimah Janji" with Ernie Zakri song by Manusia Putih and lyric by Budhi Hekayat. Soon he produced another single called "Buatmu Cinta" OST for Astro Ria drama "Projek Memikat Suami", written by Adi 6ixth Sense.

== Personal life ==
In February 2014, Aiman revealed that he had been in a relationship with actress and model Nur Fathia over the past year. However, their relationship was ended in December 2015. He chose to remain silent and refused to give any statements regarding their breakup.

In December 2018, Aiman and Zahirah MacWilson hinted on their Instagram account that they were in a relationship. On 8 June 2019, Aiman announced on his Instagram account that he and Zahirah were engaged.

Aiman and his now wife, Zahirah MacWilson, were married on 20 February 2020. They announced on their Instagram account that they had already gotten married, and posted their solemnization photos.

On 8 January 2021, Aiman and Zahirah posted on their Instagram account that they had welcomed a baby boy on 5 January 2021 at 2.26 pm in Perth, Australia.

On 5 March 2021, Aiman and Zahirah revealed their son name, Isaac Raees, for the first time on their Instagram account.

On 31 May 2024, Aiman and Zahirah welcomed their second child, Inara Raisa.

== Filmography ==
=== Film ===
Year	Title	Role	Notes
2017	Kimchi Untuk Awak	Danial Lee Jae Hwan	Debut film appearances
2022	Air Force The Movie: Selagi Bernyawa	Zafran	
2024	Harimau Malaya: The Untold Journey	Kubin	

=== Television series ===
Year	Title	Role	TV channel
2011	Vanila Coklat	Amir Asyraf	TV3
2011	Kitab Cinta	Daniel	TV Alhijrah
2011	Tanah Kubur (Season 2): "Botoks"	Amir	Astro Oasis
2011	Kiah Mai Pulak	Shahir	Astro Warna
2012	Friday I'm in Love	Pitt	TV9
2012	Indera Joned	Shazrul / Indera Joned	TV3
2012	Mahabbah	Azmir	TV3
2013	Rindu Bertamu Di Abu Dhabi	Fareez	TV3
2013	Diandra	Adam Fahmi	TV3
2013	Cinta Berkalung Duri 2	Iqbal	TV1
2013	Antara Laut Cina Selatan	Wan Man	TV2
2013	Projek Memikat Suami	Zahrain Alimin	Astro Ria
2014	7 Suami	Ihsan	TV9
2014	Selamat Pengantin Madu	Zulkifli	TV3
2014	Tabir Zulaikha	Adam Akhil	TV3
2015	Isteri Separuh Masa	Nazrin Shah	Astro Ria
2016	Demi Cinta Ain	Alif	TV3
2017	Urusan Hati Cik Drama Queen	Fadhlan	Astro Ria
2017	Black Belt Kaler Pink	Al Fadhlani / King	Astro Warna
2017	Girlfriend Aku Dari Neraka The Series	Rudy	Astro Warna
2018	Pelangi Cinta 100 Plus	Azril	TV3
2018	Amira Rose	Rahman	TV3
2018	Pengantin 100 Hari	Amar	TV3
2019	Aku Cinta Dia	Affan	TV3
2019	Curi-Curi Cinta	Daniel Hakim	Astro Ria
2020	Bila Cupid Jatuh Cinta	Dani	TV3
2020	Biar Mereka Cemburu	Eidil	Astro Ria
2021	Ahli Bapak Bapak Club	Joe	TV3
2021	Jangan Menangis Cinta	Akif	TV1
2021	Semanis Senyummanmu	Chef Azim	TV3; Disney+ Hotstar
2021	28 Hari Mencari Cinta	Faisal	TV3
2022	Nusyuz Berkilat Cinta	Syazwan	Astro Ria
2022	She Was Pretty	Haniff Hilmi	Viu
2022	Tiada Maaf Buatmu	Faiz Iqbal	Astro Ria
2023	Haloba	Raif	TV3
2023	That Cover Girl	Darius	Amazon Prime Video

=== Telemovie ===
Year	Title	Role	TV channel
2012	Setahun Setengah Mencari Cinta	Alfi	Astro Warna
2012	Ombak Rania	Tengku Farid	Astro Ria
2012	Rahsia Hati	Kas	TV9
2012	Vanila Coklat Raya	Amir Asyraf	TV3
2012	Syawal Aidil & Fitri	Adam Fitri	TV Alhijrah
2012	Mariam Kampung Putat	Danial	TV3
2013	Memburu Rindu	Amirul	TV3
2013	Cinta Di Menara Al-Burj	Qazim	Astro Prima
2013	Korban Kasih	Azlan	TV3
2013	Cinta Saadiyat	Halim	TV Alhijrah
2013	Raya Pak Pak Pong	Along	TV3
2013	Bunga-bunga Jodoh	Zahir	TV9
2014	Hitam	Dahri	TV3
2014	Halim HD	Halim	TVi
2015	Girlfriend Aku Dari Neraka	Rudy	Astro Ria
2015	Lukisan Takdir	Razif	TV3
2015	Mahar Tanpa Cinta	Najmi	TV3
2015	Sujud Ibuku	Amran	TV Alhijrah
2015	Isteri Separuh Masa Raya	Nazrin Shah	Astro Ria
2016	Crush Next Door	Zarif	Astro Ria
2016	Karya 12 – Bidadari	Aditya	Astro Citra
2016	Salam Cinta Ustazah Husna	Kamarul	Astro Oasis
2016	Tumbangkan Masjid Al-Ansar	Badrul	Astro Oasis
2016	Encik Guard Dan Cik Tomboy	Shamil	TV2
2017	Kamal Kamalia	Shah	TV2
2017	Dengan Beetle Kami Beraya Lagi	Norman	TV1
2017	Azrul Bendul	Azrul	TV9
2017	Kilas	Amran	Astro
2017	Apa Dah Jadi	Mikail	TV2
2018	Rumah No. 10	Hafiz	Astro Citra
2018	Cruise Cinta Lebaran	Maizal	NTV7
2018	Cucuk Sanggul Seroja	Husin	Astro Citra
2018	Bini Aku Dari...	Rudy	Astro Warna
2022	Jangan Masuk Rumahku	Afiq	Astro Ria
2024	32 Jam	Aniq	Tonton

=== Television show ===
Year	Title	Role	TV channel	Notes
2014	Bila Bujang Masuk Dapur	Host	TV9	with Shah Iskandar
2017	The Bachelor Pad	Host	hurr.tv	

=== Web series ===
Year	Title	Role	Network
2013	Autumn Di Hatiku	Zidick	Tonton.com
2016	Sesal Separuh Nyawa	Razlan	Unifi TV

=== Theatre ===
Year	Title	Role	Notes
2014	Bidasari	Tengku Indra	Lead roles
2014	Kalung Oh! Kalung	Amin	Lead roles
2015	Y Sebuah Muzikal	Haikal	Lead roles

== Discography ==
=== Soundtrack appearances ===
Year	Title	Notes
2012	"Khalimah Janji" (with Ernie Zakri)	
2014	"Buatmu Cinta"	Projek Memikat Suami OST

== Philanthropy and endorsement ==
In April 2012, Aiman alongside Nazim Othman, Fizo Omar, Zoey Rahman, Intan Ladyana and Neelofa was appointed as the Young Biz Icons for Oxford Centre of Excellence (Oxcell). According to Oxcell, "The appointment of six icons was based on academic success and career development in the arts". Through this program, the celebrity icons will share their experiences throughout involved in the world of business and the arts.

In July 2013, the Malaysian private, free-to-air television channel TV3 appointed Aiman along with Adi Putra, Nora Danish, Fiza Sabjahan, Amar Asyraf, Nelydia Senrose, Tasha Shilla and Neelofa as the ambassador for Anugerah Syawal 2013. According to TV3, "The appointment of these celebrities is to promote programs on television and radio throughout the month of Syawal".

In January 2014, Aiman and Zara Zya was appointed as the Promotional Ambassador of Drama Festival Kuala Lumpur (DFKL) 2014. He responsible for promoting DFKL 2014 through social networking sites, participate in the roadshow, workshops and DFKL Awards 2014.

== Awards and nominations ==
Year	Award	Category	Nominated work	Result	Ref.
2013	26th Bintang Popular Berita Harian Awards	Most Popular New Male Artist	—N/a	Won	
2013	26th Bintang Popular Berita Harian Awards	Best Chemistry on Screen (with Izara Aishah)	Vanila Coklat	Nominated	
2013	Astro on the Go Fan Choice Awards	Favourite Fuyooo Actor	Projek Memikat Suami	Nominated	
2013	EH! Magazine	EH! 20 – Elegant and Desirable	—N/a	Won	
2014	1st Kuala Lumpur Drama Festival Awards	Choice Male Actor	Diandra	Nominated	
2014	1st Kuala Lumpur Drama Festival Awards	Choice on Screen Couple (with Nur Fathia)	Diandra	Nominated	
2014	1st Kuala Lumpur Drama Festival Awards	Choice Ensemble Cast	Diandra	Nominated	
2015	2nd Kuala Lumpur Drama Festival Awards	Choice Male Actor	Selamat Pengantin Madu	Nominated	
2015	2nd Kuala Lumpur Drama Festival Awards	Choice Ensemble Cast	Selamat Pengantin Madu	Won	
2017	30th Bintang Popular Berita Harian Awards	Most Popular TV Actor	—N/a	Nominated	
2018	3rd Telenovela Awards	Best Actor (Film)	Kimchi Untuk Awak	Nominated	
2018	3rd Telenovela Awards	Most Popular Film Actor	Kimchi Untuk Awak	Nominated	
