= Syazwan Zulkifly =

Malaysian actor

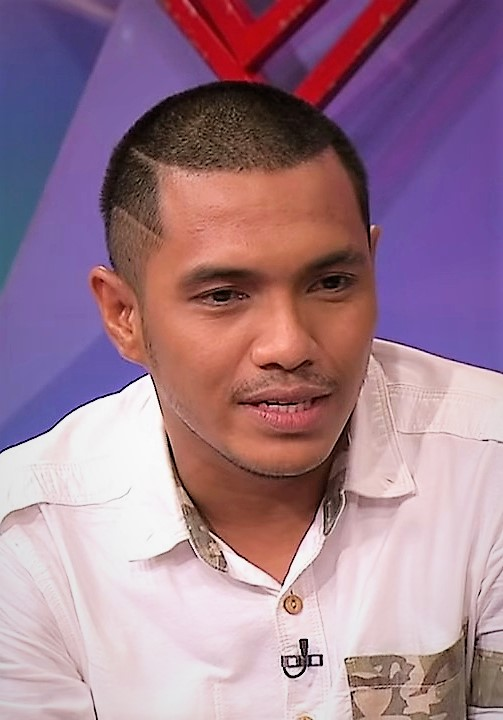
- Syazwan Zulkifly on MeleTOP
- Born: Mohd Syazwan bin Zulkifly; 20 May 1987 (age 38); Kuala Lumpur, Malaysia
- Occupation: Actor
- Years active: 2011–present
- Height: 5 ft 8 (1.73 m)

Mohd Syazwan bin Zulkifly (born 20 May 1987) is a Malaysian actor who primarily worked on television and film.

== Filmography ==
=== Film ===
Year	Title	Role	Notes
2013	Juvana	Apek	First film
2013	Kolumpo	Gangster 3	Special appearance
2014	Laga	Sabri	
2015	Suamiku, Encik Perfect 10	Syed Muzaffar	
2015	Gamatisme	Haris	
2015	Sunti @ Facebook	Adan	
2015	Transformers: Age of Extinction	James Savoy	BM version
2019	Warkah	Sufi	
2019	Kron	Arwan	Cameo appearance
2019	Wangi	Azlan	
2020	Bikin Filem	Suresh	
2022	Seratus		Cameo appearance
2023	MALBATT: Misi Bakara	Johan	
2025	Blood Brothers	Jaki	

=== TV series ===
Year	Title	Role	TV Network	Notes
2011	Gemilang	Ringgo	TV3	
2011	Juvana	Apek	TV3	
2011	Soffiya	Muiz	TV3	
2011	Wasiat		Astro Prima	
2012	Jangan Ambil Padang Kami	Arai	Astro Ria	
2012	Indera Joned	Izzi	TV3	
2012	Darjat	Haziq	TV3	
2012	Mana Hilangnya Juwita		Astro Ria	
2012	Tanah Kubur (Season 5)	Jalil	Astro Oasis	Episode: "Saka"
2013	Tanggang Ayu		Astro Prima	
2013	Bunga Merah Punya	Lima	TV9	
2013	6 Progresif Season 2	Rempit	TV9	
2013	Jodoh Itu Milik Kita	Syafiq	Astro Mustika HD	
2013	Karlos	Kenji	TV3	
2014	Aku Isterinya	Adam	TV3	
2014	PLAN B		TV3	
2014	Istikharah Cinta	Hanafis	TV3	
2014	Tanah Kubur (Season 14)	Salleh	Astro Oasis	Episode: "Air Kaki Ibu"
2014	Cinta Ibadah	Irfan	Astro Prima	
2015	Orang Gaji IQ		TV2	
2015	Bidadari	Lukman	TV3	
2015	Andai Bumi Tulip Takdirku	Bakhtiar	TV Alhijrah	
2015	Padamu Aku Bersujud	Amin	TV3	
2015	Awek Merah Jambu	Qayyum	TV2	
2015	Kondominium		TV2	
2016	Kifarah Mistik: Panas		TV3	
2016	Lelaki Macam Dia		Astro Ria	
2016	2000km ke Al-Haram	Hadi	TV1	
2016	7 Hari Mencintaiku	Helmi	TV3	
2016	Cinta Roller Coaster	Syakir	TV3	
2017	Nahu Rindu	Zamani	TV3	
2017	Menantu Bilal	Rahman	TV3	
2017	Isteri-Isteri Ayah	Nizam	TV3	
2017	Sedingin Cinta Antasya	Syarfan	HyppTV	
2017	Mocha Kau Bahagia	Zikry	TV3	
2017	Misteri Jenazah		Astro Prima	
2018	Kalis Kasih	Bard	TV3	
2018	Halalkan Hati Yang Ku Curi	Syazwan	TV3	
2018	Pujaan Hati Kanda	Pali	TV3	
2019	Cinta Tanpa Henti	Daniel	TV3	
2019	Ajak Oh Ijal	Razak	TV3	
2019	Rumah Siti Khadijah		TV3	
2020	Alergi Mamat Romantik	Bakhtiar	TV Okey	
2020	7 Hari Mencintaiku 2	Helmi	TV3	

=== Telemovie ===
Year	Title	Role	TV Network
2011	Tangisan Langsuir	Kamal	Astro Prima
2012	Maafkan Aku	Firdaus Hazadi	TV3
2013	Di Bawah Satu Langit	Khai	TV3
2013	Wasilah Cinta	Shahrol	TV2
2013	Karlos Bolos	Kenji	TV3
2013	Dendam Rindu		TV3
2014	Cinta Hati Suri		TV3
2014	Dia Al-Amin	Amin	TV9
2014	Ada Apa Dengan Raya	Azlan	Astro Ria
2015	Kalung Kak Dara		TV3
2015	Bila Ajal Menanti	Budi	TV Alhijrah
2015	Melrose	Palau	Astro Citra
2015	Akhil Yang Bakhil	Akhil	TV9
2016	Ku Haramkan Susu Itu	Hazim	TV9
2016	Bila Tiba Saatnya	Ruzman	TV3
2016	Stailista Cinta	Farid	TV2
2017	D'Kayangan		TV2
2017	Menanti Pelangi	Imran	TV1
2017	Kung Fu Kaw	Bakar	TV3
2017	Musafir Lalu	Shidi	TV9
2017	Angka Cinta	Adam	TV2
2018	Simpang Sejenak	Hanif	TV3
2018	Kebaya Mek Hwa	Dani	TV3
2018	Lalang	Embong	TV1
2018	Akil & Juan	Fahmi	TV3
2019	Rengkat	Bard	TV3
2019	Pujaan Hati Kanda Raya	Pali	TV3
2019	Hantu Don	Hassan	TV3
2019	Saka Zain Jusoh		Astro Citra
2019	Insan Terpilih	Firdaus	TV3

== Awards and nominations ==
Year	Award	Category	Nominated work	Result
2013	26th Malaysia Film Festival	Most Promising Actor	Juvana	Nominated
2014	27th Malaysia Film Festival	Most Supporting Actor	Laga	Nominated
