= Filmscape =

Media company in Malaysia

Filmscape Sdn Bhd
- Company type: Private Limited Company
- Founded: Kuala Lumpur, Malaysia (1994)
- Headquarters: Malaysia
- Key people: Kabir Bhatia; Mira Mustaffa
- Services: TV and film production
- Parent: Juita Viden Media Entertainment Group Berhad

Filmscape Sdn Bhd is one of the media and entertainment companies founded in Malaysia in 1994 by Kabir Bhatia. Filmscape has since diversified, and now provides a range of services related to the media and entertainment industry, specializing in both production and distribution capabilities.

== Products and services ==
=== Films ===
- 2011: Nur Kasih The Movie
- 2013: Juvana
- 2013: Sembunyi
- 2014: Dollah Superstar
- 2014: Gila Baby
- 2015: Juvana 2: Terperangkap Dalam Kebebasan
- 2016 : Juvana 3

=== Drama ===
- 2007: Manjalara (TV3)
- 2007: Hikayat Putera Shazlan (Astro Ceria)
- 2007: Incredible Tales (MadiaCorp Singapore)
- 2008: Frontpage (ntv7)
- 2008: Kekasihku Seru (TV3)
- 2008: Sutera Maya (TV3)
- 2008: Hartamas (ntv7)
- 2009: Jalan Merdeka (Astro Warna)
- 2009: Tower 13 (TV3)
- 2009: Nur Kasih (TV3)
- 2010: Tudung Ekspress (Astro Prima)
- 2010: Penunggu Gunung Raya (TV3)
- 2010: Akinabalu (Astro Citra)
- 2010: Habil & Qabil (TV3)
- 2010: Tiramisu (TV3)
- 2011: Gemilang (TV3)
- 2011: Juvana (TV3)
- 2011: Supermak (TV3)
- 2011: Wasiat (Astro Prima)
- 2011: Soffiya (TV3)
- 2012: Waris (TV3) - Sequel to Kekasihku Seru
- 2012: Bukan Bidadari (TV3)
- 2012: Hanya Padamu (TV3)
- 2013: Tanah Merah (ntv7)
- 2013: Cinta Jangan Pergi (TV9)
- 2013: Ummi (TV3)
- 2013: Puteri Malam (TV9)
- 2014: Jiwa (TV3)
- 2014: Antidot (TV3)
- 2015: Delina (TV3)
- 2015: Puteri Bukan Nama Sebenar (TV3)
- 2015: Keluarga Pontimau (TV3)
- 2015: Stella (TV9)
- 2015: Maria Terindah (Hypp Sensasi)
- 2016: Jom Kahwin (Hypp Sensasi)

=== Telemovie ===
- 2010: Keabadian Cinta (Astro Citra)
- 2011: 7 Lagu (Astro Citra)
- 2011: Di Telapak Kaki Bonda (TV3)
- 2011: Semangat Merdeka (Astro Prima)
- 2011: Aduh Sayang (TV3)
- 2012: Alamak 7 Hari Lagi (TV3)
- 2013: Dari Ibu (TV3)
