= Izzue Islam =

Malaysian actor, singer, and host (born 1990)

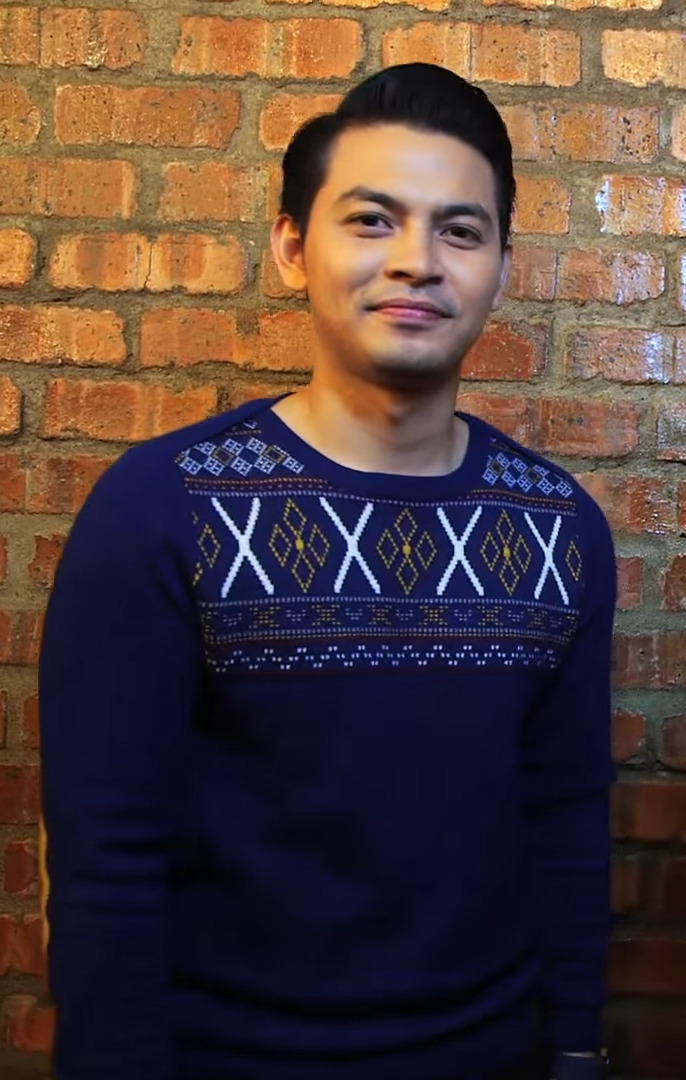
- Izzue in April 2016.
- Born: Muhammad Izzul Islam bin Mazlan; 2 June 1990 (age 35); Kota Bharu, Kelantan, Malaysia
- Occupations: Actor, singer, host
- Years active: 2009–present
- Spouse: Awin Nurin (m. 2013)
- Website: izzueislam.com

Muhammad Izzul Islam bin Mazlan (born 2 June 1990) better known by his stage name Izzue Islam, is a Malaysian actor, singer and host. At the 2013 Malaysia Film Festival, he was awarded in the Most Promising Actor category.

After leaving Forteen, Izzue focused entirely on his solo career. He contributed a song titled "Kau" which was chosen as the theme song for the film XX Ray III directed by Aziz M. Osman. On his 30th birthday, Izzue released his single titled "Biar" which has a pop rock concept. His official music video has received 77,000 views.

== Filmography ==
=== Film ===
Year	Title	Role	Notes
2011	Khurafat: Perjanjian Syaitan	Night Club Visitors	Additional Actor (as Muhammad Izzul Islam)
2011	Songlap	Razak	
2012	29 Februari	Razak	
2012	Hantu Kapcai	Man Greng	
2013	Hantu Tok Mudim	Borhan	
2013	Ular	Saiful	
2013	Chikaro	Mukhriz	
2014	Kami Histeria	Pitt	
2014	Mat Tudung	Azhar / Azharina	
2014	Ribbit	Labah Labah	
2015	Sunti @Facebook	Asyiq Ismail	
2015	Suami Aku Ustaz	Johan	
2016	Aliff Dalam 7 Dimensi	Aliff	
2019	XX Ray 3	Rayyan	
2019	Bella & Jamie	Reza	
2021	Hantu Ke Lima	Kent	
2022	Juang	Zaki	
2022	Seratus		Cameo appearance
2022	Remp-It 2	Dek Wan	
2023	Mat Tudung Begins	Azhar / Azharina	
2024	Waruga: Kutukan Ilmu Hitam	Jawahir	

=== Television series ===
Year	Title	Role	TV channel
2009	Blogger Boy: Episode 23	Brother Rafiq	8TV
2010	Pintu Taubat		Astro Oasis
2011	Gemilang	Halim	TV3
2011	Cita & Cinta	Azlan	TV9
2011	Aishiteru	Ammar	TV9
2012	Aku Tak Percaya Cinta	Irshad	TV1
2012	Mimpi Cinderella	Haikal	TV3
2012	Jangan Ambil Padang Kami	Roy	Astro Ria
2012	Duri	Hazim	Astro Prima
2013	Maskara	Joe	TV1
2013	Bunga Merah Punya!	Merah	TV9
2013	Sebenarnya, Saya Isteri Dia!	Firash Arshad	TV3
2013	Sahabat	Toi	Astro Ria
2014	Aku Isterinya	Mikail	TV3
2015	Suami Sebelah Rumah	Dr Amar	TV3
2016	Antara Dua Dunia	Azman	TV Alhijrah
2016	Dia Semanis Honey	Fairuz	Astro Ria
2016	Dia Semanis Honeymoon	Fairuz	Astro Ria
2016	Patahnya Sebelah Sayap	Amzar	TV3
2017	Ops Cinta Din Sardin	Din Sardin	TV3
2017	Kisah Yang Hilang	Fattah Aqil	TV3
2018	Tok Adi	Haikal	Astro Oasis
2018	Solat: Dekatkan Kami DenganMu	Ali	TV3
2018	Jangan Benci Cintaku	Syazwi	TV3
2018	KOPI: Secangkir Kopi Bersama Dia	Johan	Tonton

=== Television movie ===
Year	Title	Role	TV channel
2011	Si Tudung Tweet	Suhaimi	TV9
2011	Sebelum Lima Perkara	Ikmal	TV3
2011	Azam Ala Kazam	Fuad	TV3
2011	Cintaku 120 km/j	Aril	TV3
2012	Senyuman Di Kuala Lumpur	Ismadi	Astro Prima
2012	Cik Paris Diva Kampung	Sufian	Astro Prima
2012	Jidin Puasa Lagi		TV3
2012	Lepas Raya Harap Balas	Syawal	TV3
2012	Getaran Jiwa	Nas	TV1
2013	Oh My Ganu!	Aiman	Astro TVIQ
2014	Aira Airil	Airil	TV2
2014	Ya Habibi	Habibi	TV2
2014	Kisah Hidup Jai	Jai	TV3
2014	Kerana Seorang Ammar	Ammar	TV Alhijrah
2014	Sebenarnya, Saya Isteri Dia! Raya	Firash Arshad	TV3
2014	Sedalam Mana Cinta	Ashraf	TV3
2014	Tingkat Atas Tingkat Bawah	Hakimi	TV9
2014	Oh My English!: Villa Isabellaaa!	Aiman	Astro TVIQ
2015	Bila Kau Datang	Izman	Astro Ria
2015	Din Sardin	Din Sardin	TV3
2015	Lintang Pukang	Izat	Astro Prima
2015	Imam Kacak Pakwe Kami	Daniel	TV1
2016	Dia Semanis Honey Raya	Fairuz	Astro Ria
2016	Rantai	Faizal	TV2
2016	Oh My Ganu! 2	Aiman	Astro TVIQ
2017	Hujan Panas Di Inderasabah	Teacher Lokman	TV2
2017	Peah Singa	Aifan	TV9
2017	Cinta Latah	Mokhtar	TV2
2017	Dengan Lafaz Bismillah	Lokman	TV2
2017	Mek Minyak	Ismail	TV2
2017	Ke Pintu Kaabah	Farid	TV1
2017	Jongkong	Wan Yusof	Astro Citra
2017	Kesempatan Kedua	Taufik	TV3
2017	Pengemis Itu Saudaraku	Danish	TV3
2018	Mr Smiley	Rafiq	TV2
2018	Abang Kandung	Saiful	TV3
2018	Din Sardin Beraya	Din Sardin	TV3
2018	Selirat	Azrul	TV3
2018	Matilahnak	Izzue	Astro Citra
2018	Hidayah Itu Milik Ilahi	Farish	TV1
2018	Dilema	Tengku Nafrin	NTV7
2018	Detektif Danish		Astro Ceria
2019	Karma Cinta	Mustaqim	TV1
2019	Resort Berhantu	Keyell	TV3
2019	Kau Langit Aku Laut	Anas	TV3
2019	Tetamu Iman	Zakuan	TV1
2019	Kampung Batu 120	Zakri	Astro Citra
2019	Chef Gangster	Fakhrul	TV1
2019	Dosa Semalam	Azlan	TV3
2019	Misteri Akil Balik	Akil	TV3
2019	Saka Zain Jusoh	Mahaguru Bentara Muda	TV3
2019	Wakaf Dosa	Daniel Muhaimin	TV3
2019	Jongkong	Wan Yusuf	Astro Citra
2019	Sahur Terakhir	Haikal	TV Okey
2019	Hati Belum Berkubur	Zoey	TV1

=== Television ===
Year	Title	Role	TV channel	Notes
2022	Melodi	Guest Host	TV3	
2022	I Can See Your Voice Malaysia (season 5)	Host	TV3	with Ain Edruce
2023	Muzik Muzik 38	Host	TV3	
2023	I Can See Your Voice Malaysia (season 6)	Host	TV3	with Shiha Zikir
2024	Muzik Muzik 39	Host	TV3	

== Awards and nominations ==
Year	Award	Category	Nominated work	Result
2013	26th Bintang Popular Berita Harian Awards	Most Popular Male New Artist	—	Nominated
2013	MeleTOP Era Awards 2014	Couple MeleTOP (with Awin Nurin)	—	Nominated
2013	26th Malaysia Film Festival Awards	Most Promising Actor	29 Februari	Won
2013	17th Skrin Awards	Best Supporting Actor - Film	29 Februari	Nominated
2013	2nd Blockbuster Awards	Best Leading Actor	Hantu Kapcai	Won
2014	1st Kuala Lumpur Drama Festival Awards	Choice Actor Award	Sebenarnya, Saya Isteri Dia!	Nominated
2014	1st Kuala Lumpur Drama Festival Awards	Choice Cast Award	Sebenarnya, Saya Isteri Dia!	Won
2014	1st Kuala Lumpur Drama Festival Awards	Choice Couple Award (with Tiz Zaqyah)	Sebenarnya, Saya Isteri Dia!	Nominated
2016	3rd Kuala Lumpur Drama Festival Awards	Choice Actor Award	Suami Sebelah Rumah	Nominated
2016	29th Bintang Popular Berita Harian Awards	Most Popular Film Actor	—	Nominated
2017	4th Kuala Lumpur Drama Festival Awards	Choice Antagonist Character Award	Patahnya Sebelah Sayap	Won
2018	31st Bintang Popular Berita Harian Awards	Most Popular TV Actor	—	Nominated
