= Nelydia Senrose =

Malaysian actress (born 1994)

Datin Hajah Nelydia Senrose
- نيليديا سينروس
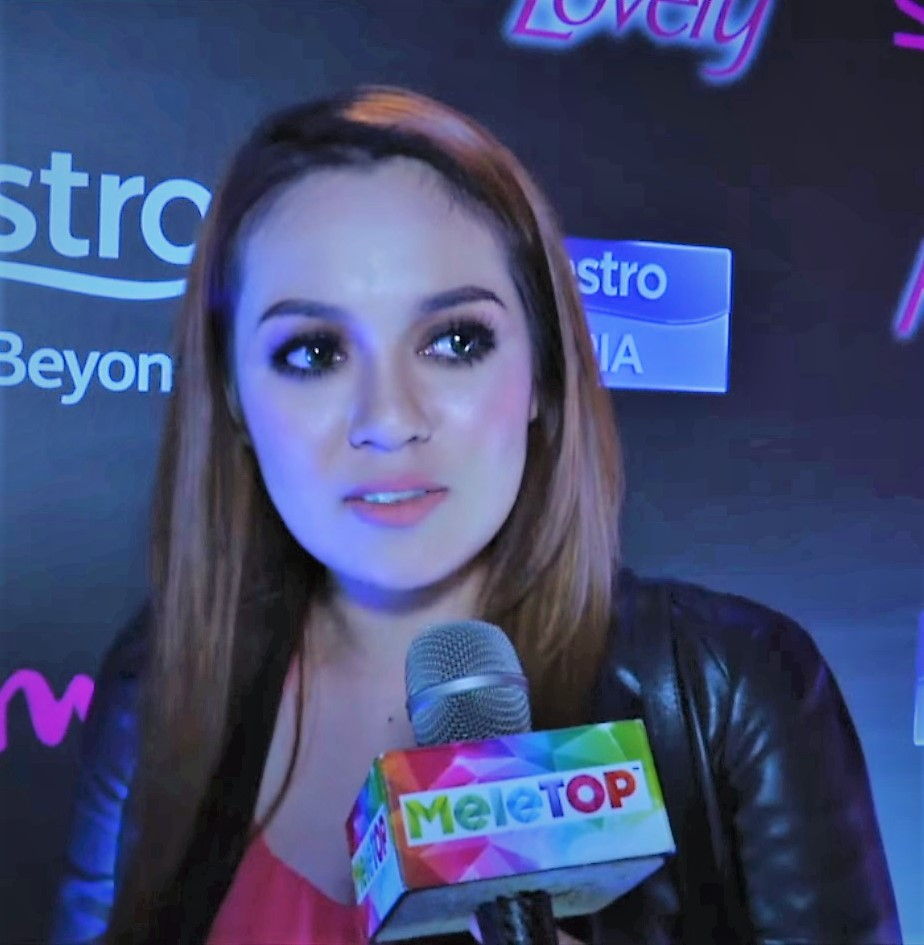
- Nelydia Senrose interviewed by MeleTOP in 2015
- Born: Nik Zaris Nelydia Binti Nik Sen; 30 July 1994 (age 32); Kota Bharu, Kelantan, Malaysia
- Education: SEGI College
- Occupation: Actress
- Years active: 2007–present
- Spouse: Dato' Mohd Hafez Halimi Abdul Hamid (m. 2019)
- Children: 1

Datin Hajah Nik Zaris Nelydia Binti Nik Sen (born 30 July 1994), better known by her stage name Nelydia Senrose, is a Malaysian actress. She debuted in 2007 and actively appeared in a few television dramas and popular in the drama Setia Hujung Nyawa as Ersalina, Bukan Kerana Aku Tak Cinta as Hannah Mastura dan Lafazkan Kalimah Cintamu as Tengku Aqilah.

== Acting career ==
At the age of 13, Nelydia Senrose began her acting career by playing the supporting role Melissa in TV3's primetime series Spa Q.

Her breakthrough as an actress came when she starred with Amar Asyraf in Setia Hujung Nyawa, a drama series based on the novel of the same title where she played Ersalina.

In 2018, she appeared in two television series—the first of two is Lafazkan Kalimah Cintamu, based on a 2010 novel of the same name where she played Tengku Aqilah, opposite Farid Kamil as Tengku Ryan Ameer. She was later cast as Ara in Cinta Tiada Ganti, a remake of 2003 Filipino telenovela, Sana'y Wala Nang Wakas.

== Personal life ==
Nelydia is the third of eight siblings. She is of Siamese and Malay ancestry. She comes from Kota Bharu, Kelantan and stays in Kuala Lumpur, Malaysia. Nelydia's elder sister, Uqasha Senrose, is also an actress.

Nelydia graduated from Sekolah Menengah USJ 13, Subang Jaya when she was 17 years old. Nelydia got 6A's in Sijil Pelajaran Malaysia (Certificate Education of Malaysia) (SPM) and is studying Psychology at SEGI College.

Nelydia married businessman Mohd Hafez Halimi Abdul Hamid on 6 April 2019.

== Filmography ==
=== Film ===
Year	Title	Role	Notes
2013	Cinderella	Nurul	Film debut
2014	Mat Tudung	Zizie	
2014	Despicable Me 2	Margo	Voice over (Malay Version)
2020	Jebat	Hannah Mastura	

=== Television series ===
Year	Title	Role	TV channel	
2007	Spa Q	Melissa	TV3	
2008	Spa Q 2	Melissa	TV3	
2009	Datin Wan Abe		TV3	
2009	Spa Qistina	Melissa	Astro Box Office Tayangan Hebat	
2010	Ahmad Durrah	Anisa	TV3	
2010–2011	Mistik Alam Hitam	Lia	Astro Ria & Astro Prima	Episode: "Ku Seru Jin"
2010–2011	Mistik Alam Hitam		Astro Ria & Astro Prima	Episode: "Banglo Kayu"
2011	Pak Suman	Aisyah	TV Alhijrah	
2012	Puaka Bunga Tanjung	Mayang Bidari	TV9	
2012	Friday I'm In Love	Nisha	TV9	
2012	Naziha	Vina	TV3	
2012	Setia Hujung Nyawa	Ersalina Imani	TV3	
2013	Cinta Jannah	Jannah	TV3	
2013	Bukan Kerana Aku Tak Cinta	Hannah Mastura	Astro Mustika HD	
2013	Sesuci Cintamu	Aishah	TV1	
2014	Strawberi Dan Karipap	Aunty Lisa	Astro Ceria	
2014	Setitis Kasih Darmia	Darmia	TV9	
2015	Strawberi Dan Karipap (Season 2)	Aunty Lisa	Astro Maya HD	
2016	Jasmine	Jasmine	TV3	
2016	Strawberi Dan Karipap (Season 3)	Aunty Lisa	Astro Ceria	
2016	Pergilah Air Mata	Sabrina	TV1	
2016	Lara Terindah	Elena	TV3	
2017	Pergilah Air Mata	Sabrina	TV1	4 Special Episodes
2017	Encik Suami Mat Salih Celup	Iman	TV1	
2018	Lafazkan Kalimah Cintamu	Tengku Aqilah	Astro Ria	
2018	Cinta Tiada Ganti	Arabella	Astro Prima	
2019	Lelakimu Yang Dulu	Daliya	TV3	
2020	Cinta Sekali Lagi	Amanda	TV3	
2021	Kampung Kolestrol	Teratai	TV9	
2022	Khilaf Asmara	Irma Sufia Amri	TV3	
2023	Bunga, Aku Tunggu	Bunga	TV3	

=== Telemovie ===
Year	Title	Role	TV channel
2009	Anak Aku Artis		Astro Ria
2011	Iqra'		TV3
2011	Khalifah	Siti Mariam	TV3
2011	Si Tudung Tweet	Kamariah	TV9
2013	Setia Hujung Nyawa Raya	Ersalina Imani	TV3
2013	Hi Papa	Aleeya	Astro Ceria
2013	Cinta Laila Majnun	Laila	Astro Oasis
2014	Bibik I Artis	Bibik Mek	TV3
2014	Ada Apa Dengan Raya		Astro Ria
2014	Strawberi Dan Karipap: Sesat Di Paris	Aunty Lisa	Astro First Exclusive
2015	Strawberi Dan Karipap: Hello Gold Coast	Aunty Lisa	Astro First Exclusive
2015	Cik Puan Bibik		TV1
2016	Crush Next Door	Hani	Astro Ria

=== Television ===
Year	Title	Role	TV channel
2015	Ketuk Ketuk Ramadhan	Guest	TV1

== Philanthropy ==
In July 2013, the Malaysian private, free-to-air television channel, TV3 appointed Senrose along with Adi Putra, Nora Danish, Fiza Sabjahan, Amar Asyraf, Neelofa, Tasha Shilla and Aiman Hakim Ridza as the ambassador for Anugerah Syawal 2013. According to TV3 "The appointment of these celebrities is to promote programs on television and radio throughout the month of Shawwal."

== Awards and nominations ==
Year	Awards	Category	Result
2013	Astro On the Go Fans Choice Awards	Favourite Fuyoo Actress	Won
2014	Anugerah Bintang Popular Berita Harian	Pelakon Filem Wanita Popular	Nominated
2014	Anugerah Bintang Popular Berita Harian	Gandingan Serasi Di Layar (bersama Sharnaaz Ahmad)	Nominated
2014	Festival Filem Malaysia ke-26	Pelakon Harapan Wanita Terbaik	Nominated
2015	Anugerah MeleTOP Era	Bintang Filem MeleTOP	Won
2015	Anugerah MeleTOP Era	Pelakon TV MeleTOP	Nominated
2015	Anugerah Drama Festival Kuala Lumpur	Pelakon Wanita Pilihan	Nominated
2015	Anugerah Drama Festival Kuala Lumpur	Pasangan Pilihan (bersama Sharnaaz Ahmad)	Won
2015	Anugerah Lawak Warna	Pelakon Komedi Wanita Terbaik (Filem)	Nominated
2016	Anugerah Melodi	Personaliti Media Sosial	Nominated
2017	Anugerah MeleTOP Era	Artis Online MeleTOP	Nominated
2017	Anugerah MeleTOP Era	Fesyen MeleTOP	Nominated
2017	Anugerah Bintang Popular Berita Harian	Pelakon Filem Wanita Popular	Nominated
2019	Anugerah Telenovela	Pelakon Telenovela Prolifik	Won
