= Fathia Latiff =

Malaysian actress

- فتحيا لطيف
- Born: Nur Fathia binti Abdul Latiff; Ayer Itam, Penang, Malaysia
- Education: Universiti Teknologi MARA (UITM)
- Alma mater: Sarjana Muda Undang-Undang
- Occupations: Model, celebrity, singer
- Years active: 2009–present

Nur Fathia binti Abdul Latiff (Jawi: نور فتحيا عبداللطيف) is a Malaysian actress, singer, and model. She is best known for playing the role of "Ummu Hani" in the hit 2010 drama Hani with Ryzal Jaafar, Siti Fathiyah Ibrahim, Nurul Elfira Loy and Esma Daniel. She also played the role as "Nabila", best friend of "Nur Amina" (playing role by Tiz Zaqyah) in the hit 2009 drama Nur Kasih which brought her name as an actress. In addition to main roles, she has shone in supporting roles and more recently, in comic roles.

== Career ==
In 2009, Fathia Latiff was a supporting role in the hit 2009 drama Nur Kasih alongside leading stage actress Tiz Zaqyah, Fizz Fairuz and Remy Ishak.

In 2011, she then appeared in Al-Hijab, a Malaysian horror movie produced by Empat Samudera Plantation Sdn Bhd. She acted as Qiss, Rafael's girlfriend led by Pierre Andre. This movie was released on 6 October 2011 In the same year, she also starred as a supporting actress in comic roles in Nasi Lemak 2.0, a Malaysian film directed by and starring Wee Meng Chee or nicknamed as Namewee. In this movie, her character was the second wife of a fisherman cast by a comedian Afdlin Shauki and was released on 8 September 2011. In addition, she starred in a different light as the main negative role in Bertaut Kasih, together with Ryzal Jaafar again and Fyda Ibrahim (a cousin of a Malaysian singer, Siti Nurhaliza).

Between 2009 and 2013, she migrated towards comic roles in dramas and telemovies such as Bila Musang Berjanggut, Ms. Cinta, Cinta Halal and Diandra.

In the year 2014, she starred in a leading role in Ariana Rose, the drama based on the novel of The Wedding Breaker by Evelyn Rose.

In the year 2015, she acted in Darah Panas, produced by White Merpati Entertainment Sdn. Bhd.

== Filmography ==
Year	Title	Role	Notes	Produce
2011	Al-Hijab	Qiss	Main actress	Empat Samudera Plantation Sdn Bhd
2011	Nasi Lemak 2.0	Fisherman 2nd Wife	Supporting actress	Prodigee Media Sdn Bhd
2015	Darah Panas	Syahana	Main actress	White Merpati Entertainment Sdn Bhd

=== Drama ===
Year	Title	Role	Notes	TV Network	Production
2009
2009	Nur Kasih	Nabila	Supporting actress	TV3	Filmscape
2009	Di Bawah Ketiak Isteri		Supporting actress	Astro Prima	Unknown
2009	Bila Musang Berjanggut	Cempaka	Main actress and comic roles	TV9	Unknown
2009	Dea Sofea			TV2	Unknown
2010	Dunia Batinku	Siti Zaharah (during adult)	Supporting actress	TV3	Unknown
2010	Hani	Ummu Hani	Main actress	TV3	Layar Konsult Sdn Bhd
2010	Laila Asyikin	Laila Asyikin	Main Actress	TV3	Unknown
2011	Stanza Cinta	Amni Sorfina	Main Actress	TV3	Unknown
2012	Mahabbah	Sabila	Main Actress	TV3	Unknown
2012	Seruling Cintamu	Bulan	Main Actress	TV3	Unknown
2013	Ms. Cinta	Zetty	Main Actress And Comic Roles	TV9	Unknown
2013	Dalam Setiap Sujud	Jannah	Main Actress	TV9	
2013	Nur Sarah	Nur Sarah	Main Actress	TV3	
2013	Diandra	Diandra	Main Actress And Comic Roles	TV3	Asia Media Content
2014	Ariana Rose	Ariana Rose / Rose Jusoh	Main Actress	TV3	Pena Creative Pictures
2015	Bencinta	Nabila	Main Actress	TV3	Zeel Production
2015	DIA.. Isteri Luar Biasa	Dewi Yusra	Main Actress	TV3	Pena Creative Pictures
2015	Plan Cinta Tak Jadi	Melina	Main Actress	Astro Ria/Ria(HD)	OrangeTree Picture
2016	Rumi & Jawi	Jawi	Main Actress	Astro Prima/Maya (HD)	
2017	Menanti Februari	Fiza	Main Actress	TV3	Sha 's Media Sdn.Bhd

=== Telemovie ===
Year	Title	Role	Notes	TV Network	Production
2011	Bertaut Kasih	Yasmin	Main actress	TV3	
2011	Tongkah Arus Dosa	Fatiha	Main actress	TV9	Asia Media Content
2012	Hotel Hasanah	Aisyah	Main actress	TV Alhijrah	
2013	Rentas Samudera	Lt. Fara	Supporting actress	TV2	
2013	Cinta Halal	Ismi Hazariah	Main actress and comic roles	TV3	Zeel Production
2013	Bunga-bunga Jodoh		Main actress and comic roles	TV9	Asia Media Content
2013	Tercipta Untukku	Riana	Main actress	TV9	
2014	Jangan Kafankan Dia	Miss Hanum	Main actress	Astro Prima	
2014	Oren dan Ceri	Amelia	Main Actress	TV2	
2015	Aku Tunggu Kau Ni	Fina	Main actress	Astro Ria	
2015	Neraka Dunia	Amelia	Main Actress	TV3	
2016	Pangkalan Batu 6	Mimi	Main Actress	Astro	

== Discography ==
Discography
Year	Title	Composer	OST
2015	Tak Pernah (Feat with Shukri Yahaya)		Dia Isteri Luar Biasa

== Awards ==
Year	Award	Category	Work	Result
2014	Anugerah Drama Festival Kuala Lumpur 2014	Pelakon Wanita Pilihan	Diandra	Won
2015	Anugerah Bintang Popular Berita Harian 2015	Pelakon Filem Wanita Popular	Darah Panas	Won
2015	Anugerah Bintang Popular Berita Harian 2015	Pelakon TV Wanita Popular		Nominated
