= Izara Aishah =

Malaysian actress

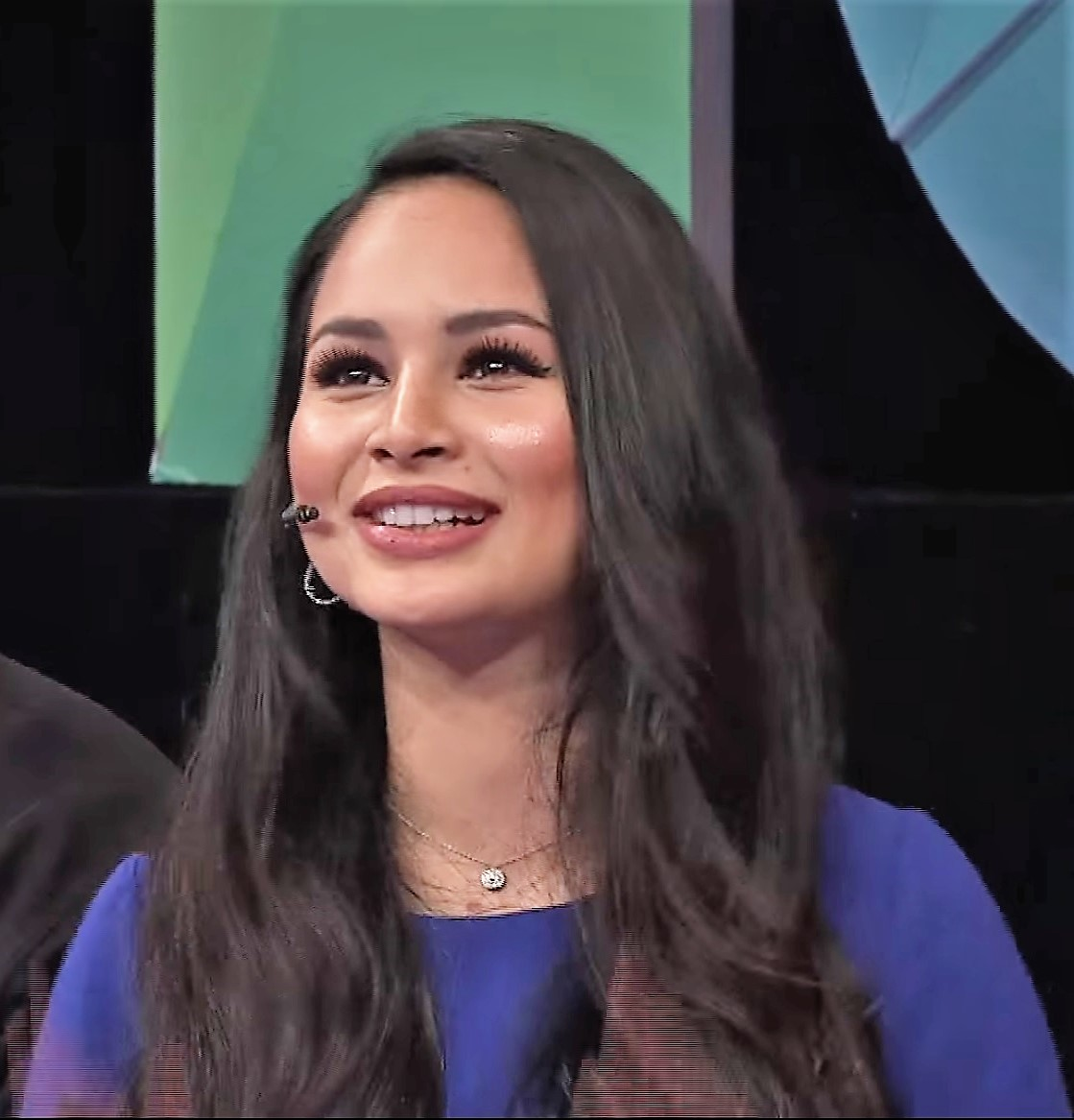
- Born: Izara Aishah binti Hisham; 28 September 1992 (age 33); Kampung Bakar Batu, Johor Bahru, Johor, Malaysia
- Education: Diploma In Performing Arts
- Alma mater: Sunway University College
- Occupations: Model, actress, student
- Years active: 2009–present
- Height: 5 ft 2 in (1.57 m)
- Spouse: Adib Khalid (m. 2017)
- Children: 3

Izara Aishah Hisham (born 28 September 1992) is a Malaysian actress and model. She debuted in 2011 and since then has starred in dramas, telemovies, television and movies.

== Early life ==
Izara was born on 28 September 1992, in Kampung Bakar Batu, Johor Malaysia. She is the first daughter of three siblings. Her father is Malay while her mother is Pakistani. She graduated from Sekolah Menengah Kebangsaan Seri Hartamas, Kuala Lumpur. Izara began her acting career in 2011. She also won 2nd place in Dewi Remaja 2009/2010. Izara began training in Muay Thai at 16, but stopped her training due to time limitations. She has been the brand ambassador for several companies and products, and has appeared in commercials for McDonald's, Burger King and Fair and Lovely.

== Personal life ==
Izara married Adib Khalid, stepson of Malaysian singer, Siti Nurhaliza on 17 November 2017.

== Filmography ==
=== Film ===
Year	Title	Role	Notes
2013	KL Zombi	Ana	First film
2013	Chikaro	Nori	
2014	Sejoli: Misi Cantas Cinta	Nita	
2015	Pilot Cafe	Maya	
2015	Sinaran	Tina	
2015	Gangsterock Kasi Sengat	Tourist Guide	
2016	Showdown The Movie	Farin	
2017	J Revolusi	Eddie	
2017	Kau Yang Satu	Salina	
2017	Balun	Nur Ain	

=== Television series ===
Year	Title	Role	TV Network
2011	Keranamu Laila	Laila	TV3
2011	Soffiya	Fiona	TV3
2011	Kasih Najihah	Najihah	TV9
2011	Jejaka J	Julia	Astro Prima
2011	Vanilla Coklat	Zara Aishah	TV3
2012	Amukan Pocong	Amy Amir	TV3
2012	Naziha	Naziha	TV3
2012	Friday I'm In Love	Fatin	TV9
2012	Oh My English! Season 1	Azlin	Astro TVIQ
2013	Cinta Pandang Kedua	Salmah	TV9
2013	Oh My English Season 2	Azlin	Astro TVIQ
2014	Kifarah: Kejam	Murni	TV3
2015	Teman Lelaki Upahan	Zarra Aulia	TV3
2015	Abang Sado Kau Ado	Sherry	TV3
2016	Cinta Masam Manis	Nur Sarah	TV3
2016	Mukhlis 2		TV2
2017	Sayang Papa Saya Tak?	Kasih	Astro Ria
2017	Masih Membara Cintaku		TV2
2017	Dia	Emelda	TV3
2018	Mr. London Ms. Langkawi	Nana	Astro Warna
2019	Jodoh-Jodoh Annisa	Annisa	Astro Prima
2019	Cinta Yang Ku Rasa	Laila Nabila	TV2
2019	Ombak Rindu The Series	Izzah	iflix

=== Television movie ===
Year	Title	Role	TV Network
2011	Hantu Gigi		Astro Prima
2011	Selumbar Kasih	Zulaikha	TV9
2011	Di Sini Bermula	Maria	TV Alhijrah
2011	Pusing Beraya		TV3
2012	Alamak 7 Hari Lagi	Diana	TV3
2012	Vanila Coklat Raya	Zara Aishah	TV3
2013	Cinta Mat Semperit	Ariani	TV3
2014	Tollgate Asmara	Latifah	TV3
2014	Seteguh Kasih Ibunda		TV1
2015	Cik Siti	Cik Siti	TV3
2015	Cikgu Gangster		Astro Ria
2016	Yang Terakhir Untukku	Dhia	TV3
2016	Rantai		TV2
2016	Sirat Al-Mustaqeem	Eika	Astro Oasis
2017	Dika Baran	Dika	TV1
2017	Isteriku, Cikguku	Maria	TV3
2017	Amnesia Pelamin Erina	Erina	TV2
2017	Ramadan Terindah Nurani	Nuraini	TV3
2017	Lambor Kanan Belakang Dewan		Astro Prima
2017	Siapa Dia Sebenarnya	Adrianna	TV3
2017	Baby Bro		Astro First Exclusive
2017	Menyusur Erti Rindu	Dalila	TV9

=== Television programs ===
Year	Title	Role	TV Network
2016	Sepahtu Reunion Live	Guest artist	Astro Warna

== Awards and nominations ==
Year	Award	Category	Nominated work	Result
2010	Dewi Remaja 2009/2010	2nd Place Winner	—N/a	Won
