= Iqram Dinzly =

Malaysian actor

- إكرام دينزلي
- Born: Mohd Iqram Dinzly bin Muhammad Saipuddin; 29 September 1981 (age 44); Ipoh, Perak, Malaysia
- Occupations: Actor, host, singer
- Years active: 2003–present
- Height: 172 cm (5 ft 8 in)
- Parents: Muhammad Saipuddin Ahmad Said (father); Lalitol Akmar Mohamed Shaffie (mother)

Mohammad Iqram Dinzly Muhammad Saipuddin (born 29 September 1981) is a Malaysian actor and television host. In February 2019, he rebranded himself as IQ Dinzly while stating that his former stage name has been 'dead'.

== Career ==
He debuted in 2005 and acted in a few dramas and films in 2006. He is noted for the television series Janji Diana (as Ijoy) and Dunia Baru (as Umar Darius) in which he appeared in the programme's second and third seasons.

Apart from acting, he is also a dancer and model. Iqram went on indefinite hiatus from show business in 2018, following his father's death and prior to his bankruptcy.

== Personal life ==
He is the third of four siblings and was born in Ipoh, Perak. He has a Diploma in Performing Arts from Universiti Teknologi Mara (UITM).

In January 2019, Iqram was declared bankrupt by the Malaysian Inland Revenue Board (IRB) after he failed to pay income tax for RM77,000. He discloses this at his Instagram account. He received a notice from the IRB lawyer at Ipoh Magistrate Court on 15 January, Iqram later said that it was his own mistake and he may not be returning to showbiz.

== Discography ==
Single
Year	Song title	Singer
2022	"Jari Neraka"	Alfie Zumi feat. Tauke Jambu

== Filmography ==
=== Film ===
Year	Title	Role	Notes
2003	Jutawan Fakir		
2007	1957: Hati Malaya	Abdullah Ahmad Badawi	
2008	Dunia Baru The Movie	Umar Darius	
2008	Evolusi KL Drift	Karl	
2009	Sifu & Tongga	Mat Rempit leader	
2010	2 Hati 1 Jiwa	Nizam	
2011	Rasuk	Arman	
2014	Apokalips X	Razor	
2014	Lagenda Budak Setan 3: Kasyah	Shan	

=== Television series ===
Year	Title	Role	TV channel	Notes
2006	Janji Diana	Ijoy	TV2	
2006	Mentari Jingga		Astro Ria	
2006	Dua Hati	Amin	TV3	
2007–2008	Dunia Baru	Umar Darius	TV3	
2007	Cinta Medik	Fikri	TV9	
2007	Mat Burger			
2007	Izinku Pergi	Khairul		
2007	Cinta Bulan	Dan Mentari		
2007	Bukan Yang Pertama	Habib		
2007	Ayah	Shafiq		
2007	Graduan	AJ		
2008	Bella	Zahar	TV3	
2009	Rempit VS Impak Maksima The Series	Ijal	TV3	
2009	La Dolce Amira	Bakri	TV3	
2009	Keliwon (Season 2)	Ishak	TV3	Episode: "Puteri Lidah Hitam"
2010	Na O Mei	Arman	TV3	
2010	Asmaradana	Faris	TV3	
2010	Ayoub	Ayoub	TV3	
2010–2011	Mistik Alam Hitam		Astro Ria & Astro Prima	
2011	Sakti Delima	Putera Nurfirdaus	TV3	
2011	Laila Manja	Azli	TV3	
2011	Puteri Aurora Beradu	Haqimi	TV3	
2011	Terowong	Joe	TV3	Episode: "Alam Lain"
2011	Kasih Alia	Qabil	TV3	
2011	Dewa Cintaku	Iqbal	TV3	
2012	Tanah Kubur (Season 3)	Halim	Astro Oasis	Episode: "Rohnya Pulang"
2013	Janji Shirah	Fahmi	TV3	
2013	Rumah Kedai	Izad	TV3	
2013	Alam Maya	Airil	TV9	
2013–2014	Bukan Kerana Aku Tak Cinta	Aryan	Astro Mustika HD	
2016–2017	Cinta 11 Syarat	Syahrie	Astro Prima	
2016	Tanah Kubur (Season 15)	Malik	Astro Oasis	Episode: "Ghasb"
2016–2017	2000km ke Al-Haram	Daniel	TV1	
2017	Joni Togo		Astro Prima	Episode: "Misteri Dusun Durian"
2021	Diva Popular	Shazzy	Awesome TV	
2021	Hati Yang Dikhianati	Azran	Astro Prima	
2022	Mem & Bibik Bibik	Bibik Body	TV3	
2022	Jiwa Wanita		TV9	Episod: "Pendatang Dengan Izin"
2022	Lockdown 2		Astro Ria	
2022	Cinta Hilang Kata	Amirul	Astro Prima	
2023	Budak Tebing 4	Norman	TV3	

=== Telemovie ===
Year	Title	Role	TV channel
2004	Zon 606	Rem	VCD
2008	Din atau Dina		Astro Ria
2008	Demi Masa	Nazli	TV3
2009	Novelis Babysitter	Sadzli	TV3
2013	Derhaka Nerhaka	Mazli	
2014	Sandiwara		
2015	Meniti Cinta Starimost	Iman	Astro Ria
2016	Pergilah Air Mata Ramadhan	Azman	TV1
2017	Dengan Lafaz Bismillah		
2017	Parut		
2017	Manja		
2019	Titi Kayu	Ali	TV3

=== Television ===
Year	Title	Role	TV channel
2009	Gegar U (Season 2)	Host	Astro Ria
2009	Chopp!	Host	TV9
2012	Jalan-Jalan Cari Makan	Host	TV3

=== Music video ===
Year	Song title	Artist
2018	"Gong Nekara"	Kmy Kmo feat. Luca Sickta

== Advertising campaigns ==
- Petronas Hari Raya (2005)
- Mister Potato (Gila Kentang)
- Hotlink

== Awards and nominations ==
In 2006, he won the Bachelor With Not A Hair Out of Place organised by Cleo magazine.
