= Dini Schatzmann =

Swiss-Malay actor (born 1994)

- Born: Dini Azan Schatzmann; 17 October 1994 (age 31); Penang, Malaysia
- Education: Bachelor of Engineering, University of British Columbia, Canada
- Occupations: Actor, model
- Years active: 2010–present
- Spouse: Janna Nick (m. 2023)

Dini Azan Schatzmann (born 17 October 1994) is a Swiss actor and model. He is notable as Daniel in Malaysian action film Blood Brothers (2025).

== Early life ==
Dini was born on 17 October 1994 in Penang. His father is Swiss-German, and his mother is Malay from Penang. He is the youngest of two siblings. He is also a model.

== Career ==
After completing his tertiary education in Canada, Dini had his debut in the drama series Cik Reen & Encik Ngok Ngek on 2018. He recently appeared in Blood Brothers in April 2025.

== Personal life ==
He is married to Malaysian actress, Janna Nick on 10 June 2023. Schatzmann speaks German at home, as well as English and Malay. In an interview, he rarely heard his mother spoke Bahasa Melayu but Penang Malay dialect instead.

== Filmography ==
=== Film ===
Year	Title	Role	Note
2022	Bintang Hatiku	Tuan Omar	Theatrical debut
2023	Malbatt: Misi Bakara	Sarjan Hamid	
2025	Blood Brothers	Daniel	

=== Drama ===
Year	Title	Role	TV Channel	
2018	Cik Reen & Encik Ngok Ngek	Naqib	Astro Ria	Debut
2019	Calon Menantu Tuan Rumah	Dowson	TV Okey	
2019	Bukan Cinta Aku	Remy	TV3	
2019	Cemburu Seorang Perempuan	Najib	Astro Ria	
2020	Leon Zalika	Leon	TV Okey	
2021	Marry Me Senorita	Isa Alejandro	Astro Ria	
2021	A.I in Love	Iskandar	TV2	
2021	The Hotel	Adri	Astro Ria	
2021	The Hotel 2: Jiwa Yang Kau Puja	Adri	Astro Ria	
2021–2022	Jangan Pernah Lupakan Aku	Ned	TV2	
2021–2022	Sepi Itu Pasti	Noah	TV AlHijrah	
2022	Lockdown 2	Kimie	Astro Ria	
2022	Kau vs Aku	Danish Aryan	Sooka	
2022	IMperfect	Adam	Astro Ria	
2023	Cik PA Tuan Ash	Tuan Ashley	TV3	
2023	Cik Lang Swe	Cik Lang Swe	Tonton	
2024	Kau vs Aku 2	Danish Aryan	Astro Ria	
2024	Bercakap Dengan Jun	Jun	Astro Ria	
2024	Legenda Puteri Qaseh 2		Astro Ceria	

=== Telefilm ===
Year	Title	Role	TV Channel	Note
2019	Cik Reen & Encik Ngok Ngek Raya	Naqib	Astro Ria	First telefilm
2021	Delen	Robert	Astro Citra	
2022	Raya-Nion!	Ren	Sooka	
2022	Secret Admirer	Ahmad Haireez	Astro Citra	

=== Video music ===
Year	Title	Duo
2022	"Mentari Setia"	Janna Nick
