= Young Imam =

Young Imam (Malay: Imam Muda) was a Malaysian television series that commenced broadcasting in 2010. The show featured young men competing for a post as the imam of a mosque and a scholarship to study at the Islamic University of Madinah.

== Competition ==
10 men entered the show as contestants, aged between 19 and 27. Over 1,000 people auditioned to enter the show. Each week of the show, the contestants were tested by undertaking ritual tasks (such as delivering sermons) and on their religious knowledge. The head judge was former imam of Malaysia's National Mosque, Hasan Mahmood.

The prize for the competition's winner included a scholarship to study at Islamic University of Madinah in Saudi Arabia, a pilgrimage to Mecca, a posting as imam of a mosque, 20,000 Malaysian ringgit and a new car.

The two finalists were Muhammad Asyraf Mohd Ridzuan and Hizbur Rahman Omar Zuhdi. On 30 July 2010, Muhammad Asyraf, a 26-year-old religious teacher, was announced as the winner.

The two finalists for the 2011 season were Mohd Hassan Adli Yahaya and Nazrul Izwan Zolkiflee. In July 2011, Mohd Hassan, a 26-year-old, was announced as the winner.

== Ratings and reception ==
The show was the highest rating show in the history of Astro Oasis, a television channel dedicated to religious programming.
