= Dejavu di Kinabalu =

2012 Malaysian television series

- Genre: Drama; Melodrama; Romance
- Created by: Datin Zaiton Muhd Jiwa
- Based on: Summer Scent by Choi Ho-yeon, Kim Eun-hee and Yoon Eun-kyung
- Written by: Eirma Fatima
- Directed by: Fazli Yahya; Eirma Fatima
- Starring: Tiz Zaqyah; Aqasha; Nazim Othman; Aishah Ilias
- Theme music composer: Melly Goeslaw
- Opening theme: Butterfly - Melly Goeslaw feat Andika Pratama
- Ending theme: Butterfly - Melly Goeslaw feat Andika Pratama
- Country of origin: Malaysia
- Original language: Malay
- No. of seasons: 1
- No. of episodes: 28

Production
- Executive producer: Zetty Alia Dato' Ramly
- Producer: Datin Zaiton Muhd Jiwa
- Cinematography: Asraf Hj. Lukmanal Hakim
- Editors: S.C Elliot; Raishah Sultan; Yan@Helmi Mohd Saleh
- Running time: 38-42 minutes
- Production company: Global Station

Original release
- Network: TV3
- Release: 18 June – 2 August 2012

Related
- Summer Scent; Autumn in My Heart; Luruhnya Bunga Cinta

Dejavu Di Kinabalu (English: Dejavu in Kinabalu) is a 2012 Malaysian television series starring Tiz Zaqyah, Aqasha, Nazim Othman and Aishah Ilias. This drama is a remake-adaptation of 2003 KBS2 South Korea television series Summer Scent with some story lines (the ending) were altered. It aired on TV3 from June 18 to August 2, 2012, every Monday to Thursday at 19:00 MST. It is also available in YouTube Drama Sangat.

== Plot ==
Ammar (Aqasha) could still feel loss and emptiness in his heart even though his beloved girlfriend died three years ago. Could this be a coincidence or fate, when he met Nadira (Tiz Zaqyah), who has the same characteristics as his late girlfriend? The sudden feeling of deja vu he felt every time they met has created a special bond between Ammar and Nadira.

Nadira's life changed after a heart transplant, without realizing she also received the donor's 'properties'. Nadira to find the fate of Ammar, boyfriend to the heart donor. The first meeting at the airport between Ammar who had just returned from Australia with Nadira to be holidaying in Kundasang, Sabah has brought a thousand and one stories.

Nadira's feet was hurt in the rush to meet her friend, Yusra (Sharifah Nadia Yusnita). She fell in front of Ammar. Ammar decided to help Nadira wrapped her hurt feet and bought her a new shoes. When he was there with Nadira, he felt a sense of feeling that was difficult to explain..

Ammar and Nadira met again in the same plane heading to Kundasang Sabah. Ammar returned to Malaysia to help a friend of his, Zahir (Meor Mohd), an interior designing company owner who was to conduct a project in Sabah. Ammar himself was unsure whether he returned with a new soul or Inara (Aishah Ilias'0) is still strongly entrenched in his heart. Kundasang, Sabah was the place where Ammar and Inara fell in love and it was also a place where she was buried. Love was too beautiful for Ammar and it was not easy for him to forget Inara.

To be sure the meeting between Ammar and Nadira brought an extraordinary sense of deja vu. Ammar never wanted to love anyone else, even though Inara had died three years ago. For Ammar, Inara is his first and last love. Ammar and Nadira met again in Kundasang when Nadira who kept taking pictures fell into the gorge. They both failed to rise to the top because it was already late afternoon and had an overnight stay.

After returning to Kuala Lumpur, Nadira and Ammar met again. They had to work together on a renovation project conducted by Bazli (Nazim Othman). Bazli is the manager of the Villa Hotel, a family business who is also Nadira's fiance. Nadira and Ammar met regularly for work routine. They became friends fast because of many similarities in the discussions for the project. Ammar failed to control his feelings and poured out his heart to Nadira. Nadira's sister, Uzma (Rebecca Nur Al Islam), who fancied Ammar, knew the connection between Ammar's late girlfriend and her sister, but she chose not to tell anyone.

Is it true that Ammar loved Nadira or just for Inara? What is the outcome of a love triangle between Ammar, Nadira and Bazli?

== Cast ==
=== Main cast ===
- Tiz Zaqyah as Dalilah Nadira

Undergo a heart transplant. Bazli's fiancee. Indebted and lived for Bazli. Without realizing it she received Inara's heart, Ammar's lover.

- Aqasha as Ammar Zulkarnain

Loyal lover. Loved Inara wholeheartedly. Half his life fly with Inara's death. Discovered Nadira by accident and fell in love with her. Saw Inara's shadows inside Nadira.

- Nazim Othman as Bazli Aiman

Nadira's fiance. Loved Nadira so much and willing to sacrifice anything for Nadira. Financed the cost of Nadira's heart transplant surgery.

- Aishah Ilias as Inara

Ammar's lover. Loved beauty and nature. Ammar pulse and heart love.

=== Extended cast ===
- Meor Mohd as Zahir
- Sharifah Nadia Yusnita as Yusra
- Eina Azman sebagai Tiara
- Sura Sojangi sebagai Theera
- Datin Rebecca Nur Al-Islam as Dalilah Uzma
- Datin Fadilah Mansor as Suria
- Aida Khalida as Fazeera
- Dato' Aziz Singah as Khairudin
- Dian P. Ramlee as Norseha
- Khaty Azean as Marisa

== Filming locations ==
The following filming locations were featured in the series;

- Kuala Lumpur, Malaysia
- Pantai Cherating, Pahang
- Janda Baik, Pahang
- Kota Kinabalu, Sabah

== See also ==
- Heart
- Organ transplant
- Cellular memory
