= Spa Qistina =

2010 Malaysian television series

- Genre: Drama; Romance
- Based on: Spa Q Spa Q 2
- Directed by: Zulkifli R. Shad
- Starring: Nanu Baharuddin; Fasha Sandha; Tiz Zaqyah; Farahdhiya
- Opening theme: Ku Mahu - Dato’ Siti Nurhaliza
- Ending theme: Ku Mahu - Dato’ Siti Nurhaliza
- Country of origin: Malaysia
- Original language: Malay
- No. of seasons: 1
- No. of episodes: 13

Production
- Executive producer: Zetty Adila Ramly
- Producer: Datin Zaiton Muhd Jiwa
- Production locations: Kuala Lumpur, Malaysia
- Running time: 40 minutes
- Production company: Global Station

Original release
- Network: Astro Box Office
- Release: 5 April – 15 April 2010

Spa Qistina is a 2010 Malaysian television series starring Nanu Baharuddin, Fasha Sandha, Tiz Zaqyah and Farahdhiya. It aired on Astro Box Office from April 5, 2010 to April 15, 2010 every Monday to Wednesday at 21:00 MST. This drama is a continuation of Malaysian hit television drama series Spa Q and Spa Q 2.

== Synopsis ==
The story begins with the marriage of Dafi (Fazren Rafi) and Maya (Tiz Zaqyah), which is based on love and marriage filled with happiness. While the marriage of Qistina (Nanu Baharuddin) and Fahmi (Ijoy) for about two year has come under pressure because their problems are due to the age gap of 15 years between them.

While Marlia (Azizah Mahzan) and Zafrul also not happy because Marlia still do not believe Zafrul and blame Zafrul about miscarriage that she suffered. While Melissa (Nelydia Senrose) that have become well-known model is labeled happy, because his love for Aril (Kefli AF) is a new start.

Dilemma began to haunt the Dafi and Maya domestic when Julia (Faradhiya) suddenly appears to announce the news of a surprise. While Sofira (Jasmin Hamid) who has been languishing in prison received a visit of Frieda (Fasha Sandha), students who do not supposed to come looking for she in prison.

== Cast ==
=== Main character ===
- Nanu Baharuddin as Qistina
- Fasha Sandha as Frieda
- Tiz Zaqyah as Maya
- Farahdhiya as Julia

=== Extended cast ===
- Azizah Mahzan as Marlia
- Ijoy Azhari as Fahmi
- Fazreen Rafi as Dafi
- Riezman Khuzairi as Dr. Zulfadzli
- Nelydia Senrose as Melissa
- Jasmin Hamid as Sofiera
- Kefli AF as Aril
- Amyza Adnan as Kathy
- Ainul Aishah as Vina
- Watie Sadali as Ninie
- Kencana Dewi as Sheila
- Wan Raja as Tarmizi

== Trivia ==
- Norish Karman was replaced by Nanu Baharuddin to play as Qistina in this drama.
