= Nur Kasih The Movie =

- Directed by: Kabir Bhatia
- Written by: Mira Mustaffa
- Produced by: Kabir Bhatia; Mira Mustaffa; Francis Foo; Leng Lai; Ahmad Puad Onah; Tengku Iesta Tengku Alaudin
- Starring: Remy Ishak; Tiz Zaqyah; Fizz Fairuz
- Cinematography: Nurhanisham Muhammad
- Edited by: Christopher Roland Evely Khoo
- Music by: Hafiz Hamidun
- Production companies: Filmscape; Grand Brilliance; Juita Viden
- Release date: 19 May 2011
- Running time: 93 minutes
- Country: Malaysia
- Language: Malay
- Budget: MYR 2.83 million
- Box office: MYR 4,930,000

Nur Kasih The Movie is a 2011 Malaysian Malay-language romantic drama film directed by Kabir Bhatia starring Remy Ishak, Tiz Zaqyah and Fizz Fairuz. This film serving as a continuation from the television drama series of the same name. The film was released to Malaysian cinemas on 19 May 2011.

== Plot ==
The movie begins with a view of a Jordanian desert, where two Bedouin Arabs are walking by a lonely street. They were in for an unexpected shock as they witness a train colliding in a freak accident with a vehicle.

Story continues in the village where Nur Amina (Tiz Zaqyah) and Adam (Remy Ishak) reminiscing of past memories. Aidil's wife Aliya had died of an accident leaving two children, 7 year old Ilyas and 5 year old Mariam. Aidil (Fizz Fairuz) understandably becomes sad and depressed as a single parent raising two of his children alone. Ilyas, compared to the younger and more immature Mariam, understands more of the sadness and loneliness that his father suffered as the siblings grow together.

Soon enough Nur Amina becomes pregnant, much to Adam's joy after waiting for such a long time. Adam and Nur also happen to be involved in a shelter for troubled children as volunteers.

Finally, trials will come upon him again, Nur miscarriage and their son death. Adam feel very sad and almost lost faith in God because of that trials. Adam and Nur Amina was determined to go to Mecca for pleasure and closeness with God, they both want to continue education in Jordan. Aidil replace Adam and Nur task of guiding children in the shelter wildlife.

Adam and Nur was very happy there, but Adam was hit by a recurring dream about a bad luck to come. Adam had a dream that Nur died in her lap and he was very concerned if a tragedy occurs.

== Cast ==
=== Main cast ===
- Remy Ishak as Adam Hj. Hassan
- Tiz Zaqyah as Nur Amina Abu Bakar
- Fizz Fairuz as Aidil Hj. Hassan

=== Extended cast ===
- Liza Othman as Hajjah Khadijah
- Ayu Raudhah as Alia, Aidil's wife.
- Munif Isa as Mamat
- Sara Ali as Juriah, one of the residents for the shelter who has a crush on Adam.
- Syafie Naswip as Jamal, a friend of Juriah and also a resident of the shelter.
- Mia Sara Nasuha as Mariam, Aidil and Alia's daughter
- Mohd Ilyas Suhaimi as Ilyas, Aidil and Alia's son

=== Cameo ===
- Rahim Razali as old Aidil
- Bonda Afida Es as old Amina
- Mazian Ahmad as old Adam
- Beto Kusyairy as Ustaz Wahid
- Zain Hamid as Saif
- Jehan Miskin as Iskandar
- Norman Hakim as old Ilyas
- Naeim Ghalili as the Jordanian officer

== Reception ==
=== Critical response ===
Entertainment portal Tupai gives the film an overall rating of 3 out of 5 The portal's review applauds its cinematography that attempts to imitate the feel of the series it was based on, and the acting by the three lead actors were lauded for successfully moving the audience. On the other hand, the film's plot was criticized for seemingly unable to find a resolution, making for a "scattered" pay-off. The review also pointed out on the difficulty of audiences following the story without watching the preceding TV series. The use of computer generated imagery in some scenes were commented to be not handled well and a distraction to the audience.

== Soundtrack ==
No.	Title	Artist	Length
1.	"Nur Kasih"	Tiz Zaqyah ft. Yassin	3:44
2.	"Bertemu Cinta"	Mila Jirin	3:30
3.	"Tanpamu"	Helena Adrian ft. Sabhi Saddi	4:15
4.	"Usah Pergi"	Bob Yusof	3:20
Total length:			14:09

== Awards and nominations ==
Year	Award	Category	Nominated work	Result
2011	Anugerah Skrin 2011	Best Film Actress	Tiz Zaqyah	Nominated
2011	Anugerah Skrin 2011	Best Film Act	Mira Mustaffa	Nominated
2011	24th Malaysia Film Festival	Best Men Actor	Remy Ishak	Nominated
2011	24th Malaysia Film Festival	Best Women Actress	Tiz Zaqyah	Nominated
2011	24th Malaysia Film Festival	Best Act	Mira Mustaffa	Nominated
2011	24th Malaysia Film Festival	Best Story Point	Mira Mustaffa	Nominated
2011	24th Malaysia Film Festival	Best Cinematography	Norhanisham Muhamad	Nominated
2011	24th Malaysia Film Festival	Best Music Score	Hafiz Hamidun	Nominated
2011	24th Malaysia Film Festival	Best Sound Arrangement	Dustin	Nominated
2011	24th Malaysia Film Festival	Best Costume Designer	Faizal Abdullah	Nominated
2011	24th Malaysia Film Festival	Best Theme Song	Nur Kasih "(Tiz Zaqyah with Yassin)"	Nominated
2011	24th Malaysia Film Festival	Best Promising Actress	Sara Ali	Nominated
2011	24th Malaysia Film Festival	Best Child Actor	Mohd Ilyas Suhaimi	Nominated
2011	Profima Awards	Best Director	Kabir Bhatia	Won
2011	Profima Awards	Best Key Grip	Mohd Yunus Mohd Hanafiah	Won
2011	Profima Awards	Best Camera Operator	Shahizi Osman	Won
2011	Profima Awards	Best Cinematography	Shahizi Osman	Won
2011	Profima Awards	Best Focus Puller	Ismail Abu Bakar	Won
2011	Profima Awards	Best Film	Nur Kasih The Movie	Won
2012	Blockbuster Awards	Best Film Award	Nur Kasih The Movie	Nominated
2012	Blockbuster Awards	Best Director Award	Francis Foo, Kabir Bhatia & Mira Mustaffa	Nominated
2012	Blockbuster Awards	Best Musical Drama Award	Nur Kasih The Movie	Won
2012	Blockbuster Awards	Best Theme Songs Award	Nur Kasih "(Tiz Zaqyah with Yassin)"	Nominated
2012	Blockbuster Awards	Best Hero Award	Remy Ishak	Nominated
2012	Blockbuster Awards	Best Heroine Awards	Tiz Zaqyah	Nominated
2012	Blockbuster Awards	Best New Hero Award	Syafie Naswip	Nominated
2012	Blockbuster Awards	Best New Heroine Award	Sara Ali	Nominated
2012	Shout! Awards	Best On Screen Chemistry Award	Tiz Zaqyah and Remy Ishak	Nominated
2012	Shout! Awards	Breakthrough Local Feature Award	Nur Kasih The Movie	Nominated
