= Warkah =

2019 Malaysian Malay-language family drama film

- Directed by: Opie Zami
- Starring: Namron; Syazwan Zulkifli; Isyariana; Wafiy; Rayyana Rayqa
- Distributed by: Empire Film Solution
- Release dates: 15 August 2019 (Malaysia, Brunei)
- Running time: 97 minutes
- Country: Malaysia
- Language: Malay

Warkah (English: Letters) is a 2019 Malaysian Malay-language family drama film directed by Opie Zami. It tells the story of a teenager who is caught between furthering his studies or helping out his family after an accident left his father paralysed. It is released on 15 August 2019 in Malaysia and Brunei.

== Synopsis ==
Ikmal, is a teenager and an excellent student in school. When his father, Kamil involves in an accident and is left paralysed, their family suddenly faces numerous challenges and financial problems. Ikmal is caught between his family situation and furthering his studies. Meanwhile, his teacher Ms Nur brings new hope to him.

The film includes the Malaysian Social Security Organization (SOCSO), and the film is based on an appreciation letter to SOSCO by a teenager.

== Cast ==
- Namron as Kamil
- Syazwan Zulkifly as Sufi
- Isyariana as Teacher Nur
- Wafiy as Ikmal
- Rayyana Rayqa as Hana
