= Cinta Kura Kura =

- Directed by: Nizam Zakaria
- Written by: Nizam Zakaria
- Produced by: Edry Abdul Halim; Yusry Abdul Halim; Norman Abdul Halim
- Starring: Tiz Zaqyah; Aeril Zafrel; Zizan Razak
- Production company: KRU Studios
- Release date: 1 March 2012
- Running time: 85 minutes
- Country: Malaysia
- Language: Malay
- Box office: MYR 1.17 million

Cinta Kura Kura (English: Tortoise Love) is a Malaysian Malay-language fantasy romantic comedy film directed by Nizam Zakaria in his directorial film debut and produced by KRU Studios in 2012. It features Tiz Zaqyah, Aeril Zafrel and Zizan Razak.It is set for release on 1 March 2012. This films tells us about Nani, a bubbly 21-year-old girl and her unique pet tortoise, Nico.

== Synopsis ==
Cinta Kura-Kura is a romantic comedy that tells the tale of Nani, a bubbly 21-year-old girl, and her unique pet turtle, Nico. Nico is unique as he is a rare Green Crown Sea Turtle… but more importantly, Nico has the ability to talk to humans, if he so chooses to do so.

Nani has recently moved in with her younger brother, Amin, and seems to be falling for the budding musician neighbour, Adam. Disturbed by this budding romance, Nico does everything possible to sabotage Adam's efforts to woo Nani. A love triangle develops when Nico's favourite pet shop supervisor, Fadzly tries to get close to Nani. However unbeknownst to all, his intentions are far from honourable as his actions are motivated by his goal to capture and sell Nico to an exotic food restaurant.

== Cast ==
=== Main cast ===
- Tiz Zaqyah as Nani
- Aeril Zafrel as Adam
- Zizan Razak as Nico

=== Extended cast ===
- Fara Fauzana as Mira
- Usop Wilcha as Atok
- Fizz Fairuz as Fadzly
- Bob Yusof as Amin
- Munir as Zul
- Noryati Taib as Mak Uda
- Chew Kin Wah as Mr. Lim
- Harun Salim Bachik as Nazri
- Daus AF8 as Zek
- Tauke as Salleh
- Erwin Shah Dawson as Herman

=== Cameo ===
- Patrick Lim Moey Cheng as Big Boss
- Sabrina Mohamed Ali as Big Boss Girlfriend
- Mohamad Sharifman Omar as Bodyguard 1
- Muhammad Harminder Singh as Bodyguard 2
- Tan Ai Nee as Waitress 1
- Jainis Mangkoi (Jeany) as Waitress 2
- Masshila Abd Talib as Waitress 3
- Thomas Lee Teck Hock as Cook 1
- Mohd Jasbir Khan Mohd Johari as Cook 2
- Kanapathy a/l Karunakaran as Cook 3
- Eddie Afro & The Geng as Busker

== Soundtrack ==
No.	Title	Artist	Length
1.	"Pencinta Terbaik"	Sofazr	3:32
Total length:			3:32

== Awards and nominations ==
Year	Award	Category	Nominated work	Result
2012	25th Malaysia Film Festival	Promising Director	Nizam Zakaria	Nominated
2012	25th Malaysia Film Festival	Best Theme Songs	Sofazr "(Pencinta Terbaik)"	Nominated
2012	25th Malaysia Film Festival	Best Poster	Cinta Kura-Kura	Nominated
2013	Blockbuster Awards	Best Film Award	Cinta Kura-Kura	Nominated
2013	Blockbuster Awards	Best Funny Film Award	Cinta Kura-Kura	Nominated
2013	Blockbuster Awards	Best Hero Award	Aeril Zafrel	Nominated
2013	Blockbuster Awards	Best Heroine Award	Tiz Zaqyah	Nominated
2013	Blockbuster Awards	Best Director Award	Nizam Zakaria	Nominated
2013	Blockbuster Awards	Best New Director Award	Nizam Zakaria	Nominated
2013	Blockbuster Awards	Best Villains Character Award	Fizz Fairuz	Nominated
2013	Blockbuster Awards	Best Theme Song Award	Sofazr (Pencinta Terbaik)	Nominated
