= Cinta Jangan Pergi =

2013 Malaysian television series

- Genre: Drama; Romance; Conflict; Melodrama
- Written by: Mira Mustaffa
- Directed by: Kabir Bhatia
- Starring: Tiz Zaqyah; Remy Ishak; Josiah Hogan
- Opening theme: Setengah Mati Merindu - Judika
- Ending theme: Setengah Mati Merindu - Judika
- Country of origin: Malaysia
- Original language: Malay
- No. of seasons: 1
- No. of episodes: 26

Production
- Producers: Kabir Bhatia; Mira Mustaffa; Francis Foo
- Production locations: Kuala Lumpur, Malaysia
- Cinematography: Nurhanisham Mohd (Labu)
- Running time: 38-42 minutes
- Production company: Filmscape

Original release
- Network: TV9
- Release: 6 April – 30 June 2013

Cinta Jangan Pergi (English: Love Don't Go) is a 2013 Malaysian television series starring Tiz Zaqyah, Remy Ishak and Josiah Hogan. It aired on TV9 from April 6 to June 30, 2013, every Saturday and 20:30 MST.

== Plot ==
With the sweet agreement of two lovers for life, but who would have thought that in the blink of an eye, destiny has changed everything. Lea Soraya (Tiz Zaqyah) and Kalil (Remy Ishak), two people who have never met, accidentally fall in love on a trip to Paris.

Fate seemed to find them on purpose when they once again went to the same destination to explore the whole of Europe together. At first Lea didn't like the presence of Kalil who seemed like he was trying to get her attention. But after getting to know each other, they began to feel comfortable with each other's presence. The seeds of love began to grow in their hearts after spending happy days together. Their romance continued even after they returned to London.

But who would have thought, in the blink of an eye everything that was planned changed unexpectedly. Two hearts that swore allegiance were separated when an unwanted incident happened to Khalil. The loss of Kalil makes Lea at a loss whether to continue waiting for Kalil or to forget the past and be with Hudd (Josiah Hogan).

== Cast ==
=== Main cast ===
- Tiz Zaqyah as Lea Soraya
- Remy Ishak as Kalil
- Josiah Hogan as Hud

=== Extended cast ===
- Ramona Zam Zam as Shireen
- Nadiya Nisaa as Elyna
- Bil Azali as Jaydee
- Kartina Ayob as Lily (Lea's mom)
- Aleza Shadan as Nora (Kalil's mom)
- Sheila Mambo as Hasmah (Hud's mom)
- Esma Daniel as Ibrahim (Kalil's dad)
- Faradhiya as Tasha (Kalil's stepmom)
