= Jiwa (TV series) =

- Genre: Martial arts Action; Drama; Romance
- Directed by: Kabir Bhatia
- Starring: Faizal Hussein; Kamal Adli; Remy Ishak; Siti Elizad
- Opening theme: Jiwa - Drama Band
- Ending theme: Jiwa - Drama Band
- Country of origin: Malaysia
- Original language: Bahasa Malaysia
- No. of episodes: 14

Production
- Production company: Filmscape

Original release
- Network: TV3
- Release: 4 February – 20 May 2014

Related
- Aku; PLAN B

Jiwa is a television drama airing every Tuesday on the TV3, started February 4, 2014.

== Cast ==
- Kamal Adli as Jiwa Alif, Alif and Zulaika's stepson who works as a school teacher and Fara's husband. Jiwa then became a boxer due to financial factors
- Faizal Hussein as Alif Rizal, a former member of the Royal Malay Soldier Regiment and the father of Iskandar and Jiwa is also the husband of Mastura, Zulaika. Being strict, patient towards Iskandar, Jiwa but after the death of Mastura Alif is more reserved, soft.
- Remy Ishak as Iskandar Alif, Son of Alif Rizal and Mastura (biological mother) and step-son of Zulaika. A village thug who holds a grudge against Jiwa, Alif for lack of love and migrated to Kuala Lumpur after the death of his biological mother.
- Siti Elizad as Fara, Suri's daughter and Zulaika's daughter-in-law who originally had a rude, mischievous character but changed after marrying Jiwa.
- Sheila Mambo as Mastura, Alif's first wife and Iskandar and Jiwa's mother. He often defended Iskandar if Alif scolded, Mastura died while trying to break up the fight.
- Aleza Shadan as Zulaika, Alif's second wife, and Jiwa's mother, Iskandar.
- Cico Harahap
- Wan Raja as Saleh, the leader of gangsters in Kuala Lumpur and mastermind of illegal boxing matches
