= Tiz Zaqyah =

Malaysian actress, model and singer (born 1988)

- تيز زقية
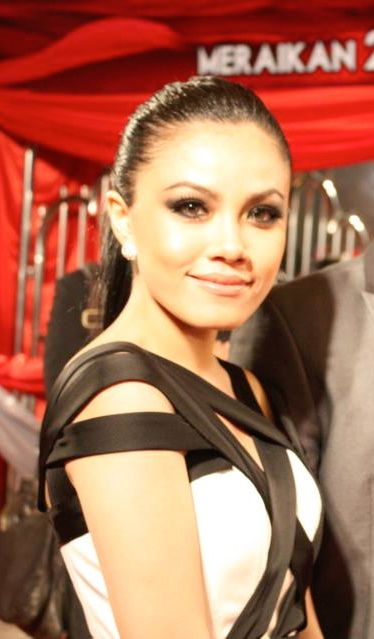
- Tiz Zaqyah in Genting Highlands, Malaysia for 24th Bintang Popular Berita Harian Awards.
- Born: Siti Zaqyah binti Abdul Razak; 25 October 1988 (age 38); Kuala Lumpur, Malaysia
- Occupations: Actress, singer, brand ambassador
- Years active: 2006–present

Siti Zaqyah Abdul Razak (born 25 October 1988), known professionally as Tiz Zaqyah, is a Malaysian actress, model and singer. She debuted in 2006 and since then has starred in films, dramas, telemovies and television and magazine advertisements. She rose to fame for playing the role of Nur Amina in the 2009 hit drama Nur Kasih with Remy Ishak, Fizz Fairuz and Sharifah Sofia. She became best known for her leading roles in Asmaradana, Gemilang, Soffiya, Dejavu di Kinabalu, Sebenarnya, Saya Isteri Dia! where she played a role of Shaf alongside Izzue Islam, Cinta Jangan Pergi where she acted with her acclaimed former counterpart partner, Remy Ishak, Jodoh Itu Milik Kita and Kusinero Cinta.

== Early life ==
Tiz Zaqyah was born on 25 October 1988, in Kuala Lumpur, Malaysia. She is the second daughter of two siblings and has one sister. She graduated from Subang Jaya Secondary School in November 2005. She began her acting career at the age of 18. She was listed on Malaysia's 10 most beautiful actress when she wears a scarf. Tiz Zaqyah is said as the actress that have an aura in her acting.

On 9 May 2021, she announced on her Instagram account that she tested positive for COVID-19 after she started develop symptoms of coughing and short shivers.

== Career ==
Tiz Zaqyah made her acting debut in the 2006 8TV drama Gol & Gincu The Series as a cameo role. Her major breakthrough was the drama Nur Kasih directed by Kabir Bhatia in 2009. In 2010, Tiz acted for two drama series, Spa Qistina playing a role as Maya and Asmaradana, a 25 episode drama broadcast by Grand Brilliance for whom she played as Tengku Azizah, together with other co stars, Shaheizy Sam and Iqram Dinzly. The production was well received by the audiences and was awarded as Best Drama in Profima Awards 2010. The series was aired on 9 March. In December 2010, it reported that Nur Kasih drama will be filmed and will run on 2011 and Tiz will sing a theme song for that film and duet with Yassin who sang the theme song for Nur Kasih drama.

In 2011, she starred in such hit dramas as Gemilang and Soffiya. In drama Gemilang she played a character as a teacher who wanted her student excel in their studies and in drama Soffiya Tiz played role as a person who has many problems and was raped by her own father. In March 2011, it was reported that Tiz will acting in her second film titled Cinta Kura Kura and that film is scheduled to hit the platform next year on 1 March 2012.

In March 2012, Tiz Zaqyah starred in Cinta Kura Kura, a Malaysian film produced by KRU Studios. She acted as Nani, a 21-year-old bubbly girl together with her beloved pet turtle, NICO played by Zizan. This movie was released in March 2012. In 2012, Tiz involved in the serial drama Dejavu di Kinabalu. In this drama, Tiz brings the character of a woman who had just undergone heart transplant surgery and he has the personality traits of the original owner's heart that makes her heart to the man is linked to the original owner lover's heart.

In 2013, Tiz will be starred in Cinta Jangan Pergi drama where she will be acting besides her former lover, Remy Ishak. On 13 January 2013, Tiz announced on her Facebook page that she would appear in a new drama called Oh My English Season 2. Tiz starred in the 60-episode drama Kusinero Cinta which aired on Astro Mustika HD and Astro Maya HD. The drama is his co-starring with Aaron Aziz and his first co-starring with Filipino actor Jericho Rosales. The drama also stars Miera Leyana, Jasmin Hamid, Arash Mohd, Putri Mardiana and many more.

On April 6, 2016, she acted in the drama Akadku Yang Terakhir with dramatist Amar Baharin, but the scene between Tiz and Amar became a public brag. Tiz then appeared in the drama Lara Cinta Ameena which started broadcasting on November 30, 2016. In 2017, Tiz appeared in the web drama Qaseh on Kota Seriemas YouTube channel.

She played the character of Mariam, wife to Saleh (played by Remy Ishak) in the 6-episode teledrama for the country's 60th independence anniversary, Anak Merdeka which aired simultaneously on Astro Prima and Astro Mustika HD from 26 August to 31 August 2017.

Tiz was paired with Kamal Adli to play the lead role in Eyra Rahman's Kolestrol vs Cinta which aired on September 14, 2017; he played the character of Krisya.

== Filmography ==
=== Film ===
Year	Title	Role	Refs.
2011	Nur Kasih The Movie	Nur Amina	
2012	Cinta Kura Kura	Nani	
2017	Kolestrol VS Cinta	Krisya	
2022	Seratus		

=== Television series ===
Year	Title	Role	Refs.
2006	Gol & Gincu The Series		
2006–2007	Impian Illyana	Ika	
2008	Sunsilk Impian	Ika	
2009	Nur Kasih	Nur Amina	
2010	Spa Qistina	Maya	
2010	Asmaradana	Tengku Azizah	
2011	Gemilang	Asma	
2011	Tahajjud Cinta	Emelda	
2011	Soffiya	Soffiya / Yaya	
2012	Dejavu di Kinabalu	Dalilah Nadira	
2013	Sebenarnya, Saya Isteri Dia!	Syafa Aqira	
2013	Oh My English!	Cikgu Ayu	
2013	Cinta Jangan Pergi	Lea Soraya	
2013	Jodoh Itu Milik Kita	Dahlia	
2014	Kusinero Cinta	Edrinna	
2014	Oh My English!	Cikgu Ayu	
2014	Seludup	Yasmin	
2015	Oh My English!: Class of 2015	Ayu	
2016	Akadku Yang Terakhir	Rania Baheera	
2016	Hero	Wana	
2016	Lara Cinta Ameena	Ameena	
2017	Anak Merdeka	Mariam	
2018	Isteri Bukan Untuk Disewa	Nur Adreiana	
2019	Mimpi Yang Sempurna	Wardah Umayra	
2019	Cerita Hantu Asrama		
2019	Sara Sajeeda	Sara	
2019	Setelah Ku Dimiliki	Sarlina	
2020	Isteri Misteri	Emma	
2021	Covid Oh Covid		
2021	Diva Popular	Ika Natelia	
2021–2022	Diva Popular 2	Ika Natelia	
2023	Liar The Series	Lara	

=== Television movie ===
Year	Title	Role	Refs.
2007	Taxi Driver	—	
2008	Bernafas Dalam Lumpur	Liza	
2008	Seandainya Aku Siti	Farah	
2009	Puaka Topeng Putih	Aini	
2009	Korban Kasih Marlisa	Nuraina	
2010	Keabadian Cinta	Dina	
2010	Kuih Makmur	Mastura	
2010	Suzana	Suzana	
2010	Cinta Akhbar	Nuraini	
2011	Mesej Terakhir	Kartini	
2011	7 Lagu	Tania / Hajar	
2011	Bukan Untukku	Izzati	
2011	Geisha Melayu Terakhir	Ai Ling	
2011	Dari Kedah Ke Kuala Lumpur	Isteri Zamri	
2011	Pencari Jalan Lurus	Naelah	
2011	Buat Tatapan Yang Tercinta	Nora	
2011	Aduh Sayang	Nani	
2012	Runtuhnya Sebuah Dosa	Emelda	
2012	Sabar Tak Sabar	Farhana	
2012	Biarlah Rahsia	Nila	
2013	Keroncong Untuk Ana	Rohayu	
2013	XOXO	Aleesha	
2013	Karlos Bolos	Ella / Suhaila	
2013	Oh My Ganu!	Cikgu Ayu	
2014	Oh My English! – Hello America!	Cikgu Ayu	
2014	Sebenarnya, Saya Isteri Dia! Raya	Syafa Aqira	
2015	Izinku Kembali	Ayra Sufya	
2015	Rose Emilia	Emilia	
2015	Lintang Pukang	Nadia	
2015	Oh My Goat	Cikgu Ayu	
2015	Cermin Kasih	Marina	
2016	Oh My Ganu! 2	Cikgu Ayu	
2016	Akadku Yang Terakhir Syawal	Rania Baheera	
2017	Aku, Mawar & Makhluk Asing	Mawar	
2017	Dengan Lafaz Bismillah	Zaleha	
2017	Gitu-Gitu Raya	Siti Rokiah	
2017	Memori Pajeri Nanas	Kayla	
2017	Bawa Aku Ke Syurga	Yana	
2018	Selirat	Intan	
2018	Hilang Akal	Helena	
2018	I Heart You Cik Yah	Yayah	
2019	Mufariq	Nira	
2019	Maaf Dari Khilaf	Salimah	
2019	Zain Jusoh	Ayang	

=== Web series ===
Year	Title	Role	Refs.
2017	Qaseh	Qaseh	

== Discography ==
=== Soundtrack appearances ===
Year	Title	Notes
2011	"Nur Kasih" (with Yassin)	Nur Kasih The Movie OST
2013	"Together" (with SleeQ & Zain Saidin)	Oh My English! Season 2 OST

== Awards and nominations ==
Year	Award	Category	Nominated work	Result
2009	Cosmopolitan Fun Fearless Fabulous Awards	Fun Fearless Fabulous – Best Couple (with Remy Ishak)	Nur Kasih	Nominated
2010	23rd Bintang Popular Berita Harian Awards	Most Popular Female New Artist	—N/a	Nominated
2010	23rd Bintang Popular Berita Harian Awards	Most Popular TV Actress	—N/a	Won
2010	2nd Stail EH! Awards	Most Sexy Female Celebrities	—N/a	Nominated
2010	2nd Shout! Awards	Best on Screen Chemistry (with Remy Ishak)	Nur Kasih	Nominated
2011	24th Bintang Popular Berita Harian Awards	Most Popular TV Actress	—N/a	Nominated
2011	15th Skrin Awards	Pantene Shine Award	—N/a	Won
2011	15th Skrin Awards	Best Actress – Film	Nur Kasih The Movie	Nominated
2011	24th Malaysia Film Festival Awards	Best Actress	Nur Kasih The Movie	Nominated
2011	24th Malaysia Film Festival Awards	Best Theme Song (with Yaasin)	"Nur Kasih"	Nominated
2012	PPMH Awards	Promising Award	—N/a	Nominated
2012	25th Bintang Popular Berita Harian Awards	Most Popular TV Actress	—N/a	Nominated
2012	1st Blockbuster Awards	Best Film OST (with Yassin)	"Nur Kasih"	Nominated
2012	1st Blockbuster Awards	Best Leading Actress	Nur Kasih The Movie	Nominated
2012	3rd Shout! Awards	Best on Screen Chemistry (with Remy Ishak)	Nur Kasih The Movie	Nominated
2013	2nd Blockbuster Awards	Best Leading Actress	Cinta Kura Kura	Nominated
2013	1st Melodi Awards	Favorite Female Artist	—N/a	Nominated
2014	1st Kuala Lumpur Drama Festival Awards	Choice Actress Award	Sebenarnya, Saya Isteri Dia!	Nominated
2014	1st Kuala Lumpur Drama Festival Awards	Choice Cast Award	Sebenarnya, Saya Isteri Dia!	Won
2014	1st Kuala Lumpur Drama Festival Awards	Choice Couple Award (with Izzue Islam)	Sebenarnya, Saya Isteri Dia!	Nominated
2014	27th Bintang Popular Berita Harian Awards	Best on Screen Chemistry (with Izzue Islam)	Sebenarnya, Saya Isteri Dia!	Nominated
2014	2nd Warna Comedian Awards	Most Popular Female Comedian	—N/a	Nominated
2016	20th Skrin Awards	Best Actress – Drama	Cermin Kasih	Won
2016	MACP Awards	Most Performance English Song (with SleeQ & Zain Saidin)	"Together"	Won
2017	2nd Telenovela Awards	Best Actress	Akadku Yang Terakhir	Nominated
2019	4th Telenovela Awards	Best Actress	Isteri Bukan Untuk Disewa	Won
