= Asmaradana =

2010 Malaysian television series

- Genre: Drama; Romance; Revenge; Melodrama
- Written by: Azlina Pa'wan
- Directed by: Feroz Kader
- Starring: Tiz Zaqyah; Shaheizy Sam; Iqram Dinzly
- Opening theme: Tak Bisa Memilihmu - 6ixth Sense
- Ending theme: Tak Bisa Memilihmu - 6ixth Sense
- Country of origin: Malaysia
- Original language: Malay
- No. of seasons: 1
- No. of episodes: 25

Production
- Executive producer: Jalena Rejab
- Producer: Tengku Iesta Tengku Alauddin
- Production locations: Kuala Lumpur, Malaysia
- Running time: 25 minutes
- Production company: Grand Brilliance

Original release
- Network: TV3
- Release: 9 March – 4 May 2010

Asmaradana is a 2010 Malaysian television series starring Tiz Zaqyah, Shaheizy Sam and Iqram Dinzly. It aired on TV3 from March 9 to May 4, 2010, every Tuesday to Thursday at 22:30 MST. It is also available in YouTube at Drama Sangat Channel.

== Synopsis ==
The story tells us about mother of Tengku Farouk (Mustapha Kemal) Rafeah (Wan Maimunah) who do not agree with the preferred Tengku Farouk, young Narimah (Memey) because Narimah is a woman club who has no bloodline.

Narimah despised by Tengku Farouk mother because she is not the same as the degree of this family. Narimah suddenly married to the brother of Tengku Farouk, the Tengku Saiful.

Rafeah have found Narimah was pregnant and then Narimah with Tengku Saiful had been driven out of the house aka the family removed. Misfortune struck Narimah when Tengku Saiful had died, so Narimah live with her daughter, Azizah (Tiz Zaqyah).

== Cast ==
=== Main character ===
- Tiz Zaqyah as Tengku Azizah
- Shaheizy Sam as Amran
- Iqram Dinzly as Fariz

=== Extended cast ===
- Puteri Sarah Liyana as Mimi
- Mustapha Kamal as Tengku Farouk
- Rozita Che Wan as Narimah
- Norish Karman as Raja Marlia
- Natasha Hudson as Aria
- Wan Maimunah as Rafeah
- Memey Suhaiza as young Narimah
- Abu Bakar Juah as Kassim
- Baharuddin Omar as Lebai Saat
- S. Sahlan as Pak Hardjo
- Delimawati as Kamariah
- Irfan Roslan as Tengku Saiful

== Awards and nominations ==
Year	Award	Category	Nominated work	Result
2010	Profima Awards	Best Drama	Asmaradana	Won
