= Blood Brothers (2025 film) =

Blood Brothers: Dragon Embers
- Theatrical release poster
- Directed by: Syafiq Yusof; Abhilash Chandra
- Screenplay by: Abhilash Chandra; Ghazwan Tomasi; Ayam Fared; Ashraf Modee Zain
- Produced by: Abhilash Chandra; Syamin Yusof
- Starring: Sharnaaz Ahmad; Shukri Yahaya; Syafiq Kyle; Syazwan Zulkifly; Amelia Henderson; Wan Hanafi Su; Zamarul Hisham
- Cinematography: Nicholas Chin
- Edited by: Abhilash Chandra; Daniel Mahamad; Syafiq Yusof
- Music by: Ricky Lionardi
- Production company: Skop Productions
- Distributed by: Primeworks Studios; CBI Pictures
- Release date: 10 April 2025 (Malaysia)
- Running time: 130 minutes
- Country: Malaysia
- Language: Malay
- Budget: RM 7 million
- Box office: RM 80 million

Blood Brothers: Dragon Embers (Note: Also known as Blood Brothers: Fury of the Dragon for Netflix releases.) (Malay: Blood Brothers: Bara Naga) is a 2025 Malaysian Malay-language action thriller film directed by Syafiq Yusof and Abhilash Chandra, starring Sharnaaz Ahmad, Shukri Yahaya, Syafiq Kyle, Syazwan Zulkifly, Amelia Henderson, Wan Hanafi Su, and Zamarul Hisham. The film was released in cinemas on 10 April 2025 to commemorate the 40th anniversary of Skop Productions.

The film received positive reviews from critics who praised action, acting, direction and cinematography but criticize the plot, twist and lack of character development. It grossed over 80 million at the box office against its 7 million budget, making it the second highest grossing local film in Malaysia after Mat Kilau. A sequel is reportedly in development.

== Cast ==
- Sharnaaz Ahmad as Ghaz
- Shukri Yahaya as Fadlan
- Syafiq Kyle as Ariff
- Syazwan Zulkifly as Jaki
- Amelia Henderson as Sheila
- Wan Hanafi Su as Dato Zul
- Zamarul Hisham as DSP Adlin
- Dini Schatzmann as Daniel
- Andy Teh as Pablo
- Irfan Zaini as Malik
- Tracie Sinidol as Mira
- Amir Nafis as Amir
- Jovi Heng as Bos Johnny
- Ray Dapdap as Bos Sam
- Mikael Noah as Adi
- Ayam Fared as Ayam
- Hushairy Hussein as Ayah Mus
- Tong Bing Yu as Madam Rita
- Razib Salimin as Sham
- Anthony Stephen as Bos Ram
- Qaid Aqwa as Young Fadlan

== Reception ==
=== Box office ===
Blood Brothers: Bara Naga opened to strong commercial success. The film grossed RM9.2 million within its first two days of release, including previews. By the third day, earnings had reached RM14.9 million, surpassing its RM7 million production budget. After four days, the film accumulated RM21 million, making it one of the highest-grossing Malaysian films of 2025.

=== Home media ===
Blood Brothers: Bara Naga was released on Netflix on August 10, 2025

== Novelization ==
A novelization by Dr. Anwar Fazal and Amshida Ahmad Rani was published by WhiteCoat Group on May 23, 2025.

== Future ==
Following its phenomenal success, Abhilash stated that a sequel was in development, during fan meet at GSC Nu Sentral, with the title Blood Brothers 2: Perang Naga.
