= Gemilang (TV series) =

2011 Malaysian television series

- Genre: Drama; Action; Romance; Education; Inspiration; Family
- Written by: Mira Mustaffa
- Directed by: Kabir Bhatia
- Starring: Shah Jaszle; Tiz Zaqyah; Kamal Adli; Tasha Shilla
- Country of origin: Malaysia
- Original language: Malay
- No. of seasons: 1
- No. of episodes: 13

Production
- Producers: Francis Foo; Kabir Bhatia; Mira Mustaffa
- Production locations: Kuala Lumpur, Malaysia
- Running time: 35-42 minutes
- Production company: Filmscape

Original release
- Network: TV3
- Release: 24 January – 18 April 2011

Gemilang is a 2011 Malaysian television series starring Shah Jaszle, Tiz Zaqyah, Kamal Adli and Tasha Shilla. It aired on TV3 from January 24, 2011 until April 18, 2011 every Monday at 21:00 MST. This drama tells us of four youths who opened private schools in remote areas for brighten the future of young children who do not excel in their studies.

== Plot ==
Saifullah (Shah Jazle) comes from a family of rubber tappers are very difficult when the world hovered around rubber plantation in the 1960s. Saifullah have three more brothers. Four brothers when they were younger, their mother had died.

Not long after, their father would join their cause to separate siblings as given to the adoptive family. Saifullah a family of adopted children were, but he never forgot his origin.

Saifullah character is a courageous, courageous and strong. Teenager, Saifullah make his teacher, the teacher Talib (Datuk Jalaluddin Hassan) as his mentor.

As adults, Saifullah successfully continue their studies and after graduation he worked at the bank in the city. But his struggle to return to their hometowns to contribute to the population. In the spirit of overflowing, Saifullah establish a private school called the Institute of Glory.

Gemilang Institute opened in 1977 to provide a second chance to students. Those who fail or who can not take MCE and HSC examinations are most welcome in the school. Saifullah good faith to establish the Institute also supported from her former college friend, Umar (Kamal Adli), Asma (Tiz Zaqyah) and Ruhana (Tasha Shilla). They are all pioneers in the institute's teachers.

This is a character drama that depicted the four teachers into their golden years in which the characters are held Aimi Saifullah Jaar, Asmah (Kismah Johari), Umar (Zulkifli Zain) and Ruhana (Aznah Hamid).

== Cast ==
=== Main character ===
- Shah Jazle as Saifullah Ali
- Tiz Zaqyah as Asma
- Kamal Adli as Umar
- Tasha Shilla as Ruhana

=== Supporting Characters ===
- Datuk Jalaluddin Hassan as Talib
- Izzue Islam as Halim
- Naim Daniel as young Saifullah
- Azhan Rani as Ali, father to Saifullah
- Che Kem as father adopted Saifullah

=== The students of the Institute Gemilang ===
- Talha Harith as Azlan
- Munif Isa as Johan
- Syazwan Zulkifli as Ringgo @ Rizal, son to gambler father
- Puteri Chi Chi as Dahlia
- Amin Abu Bakar as Kahar
- Gregory Sze Lai Huat as Chee Keong
- Kishz as Raj
- Nashreen as Hamzah
- Diandra Arjunaidi as Suzanne
- Syed Ali sebagai as Saif second brother
- Chomatt Samad as Sadiq, Saif fourth brother

== International Broadcasting ==
Indonesia

- Channel: B Channel
