= Inspiration =

Inspiration, inspire, INSPIRE, or inspired commonly refers to:

- Artistic inspiration, sudden creativity in artistic production
- Biblical inspiration, a Christian doctrine on the origin of the Bible
- Inhalation, breathing in

Inspiration and related terms may also refer to:

== Arts, entertainment, and media ==
=== Films ===
- Inspiration (1915 film), a silent drama known for featuring nudity
- Inspiration (1931 film), starring Greta Garbo
- Inspiration (1948 film), an animated short directed by Karel Zeman
- Inspirations (film), a 1997 documentary directed by Michael Apted

=== Music ===
==== Albums ====
- Inspiration, a 2000 album by Jane McDonald
- The Inspiration, a 2006 album by Young Jeezy
- Inspiration (Aziza Mustafa Zadeh album), 2000
- Inspiration (Cathy Dennis album), 1993
- Inspiration (Eddie Henderson album), 1994
- Inspiration (Elkie Brooks album), 1989
- Inspiration (Maze album), 1979
- Inspiration (Sam Rivers album), 1999
- Inspiration (Shinhwa album), 2006
- Inspiration (Tammy Wynette album), 1969
- Inspiration (William Hung album), 2004
- Inspiration (Yngwie Malmsteen album), 1996
- Inspirations (Saxon album), 2021
- Inspire (Casiopea album), 2002
- Inspire (Jack Vidgen album), 2012
- Inspire (La'Mule album), 1998
- Inspired (album), 2007, by Lea Salonga

==== Songs ====
- "Inspire" (song), 2004, by Ayumi Hamasaki
- "Inspired" (song), 2017, by Miley Cyrus

=== Periodicals ===
- Inspire (magazine), an online magazine published by the militant Islamist organization al-Qaeda
- Inspire, a newsletter on intellectual property published by Phillips Ormonde Fitzpatrick

=== Other arts, entertainment, and media ===
- Inspiration (sculpture), a 2010 public artwork by American artist Ethan Kerber
- Inspiration FM, a community radio station in Northampton, United Kingdom
- The Inspiration Network, a worldwide family and religious cable-television network

== Brands and enterprises ==
- Carnival Inspiration, a cruise ship
- Honda Inspire, a motor car
- Inspiration, a range of diver's rebreathing apparatus made by AP Diving
- Inspiration (car), a 21st century steam-propelled motor car
- Inspire (company), a healthcare social network
- Inspire (fragrance), by Christina Aguilera
- Inspire Academy, an academy for young actors founded by Luke Gell in Nottingham, England
- Inspire Brands, an American fast-food restaurant franchise company

== Other uses ==
- ANA Inspiration, a women's golf tournament
- DJI Inspire, a Chinese camera drone
- Inspiration (racehorse), a Hong Kong–based thoroughbred racehorse
- Inspiration, Arizona, a US ghost town
- INSPIRE (EU directive), the Infrastructure for Spatial Information in the European Community directive
- INSPIRE-HEP, a database of particle physics literature
- Space Shuttle Inspiration, a full-scale Space Shuttle mockup

== See also ==
- Inspiration4, a 2021 space tourism flight
- Inspirational fiction
- Inspirational music
- Muse
