= Soffiya =

2011 Malaysian television series

- Genre: Drama; Romance; Conflict
- Written by: Eenaz Mokhtar; Tommy CT Loh
- Directed by: Joeza Rasidi
- Starring: Tiz Zaqyah; Fizo Omar; Azhar Sulaiman; Izara Aishah
- Opening theme: Masih Jelas - Hafiz Suip
- Ending theme: Masih Jelas - Hafiz Suip
- Country of origin: Malaysia
- Original language: Malay
- No. of seasons: 1
- No. of episodes: 28

Production
- Executive producers: Shasha Yusof; Mohd Frank Lewis; Siti Marzuliana
- Producers: Kabir Bhatia; Mira Mustaffa; Francis Foo
- Production locations: Kuala Lumpur, Malaysia
- Running time: 35-42 minutes
- Production company: Filmscape

Original release
- Network: TV3
- Release: 21 September – 8 November 2011

Soffiya is a 2011 Malaysian television series starring Tiz Zaqyah, Fizo Omar, Azhar Sulaiman and Izara Aishah. It aired on TV3 from September 21, 2011 until November 8, 2011 every Monday until Thursday at 19:00 MST. It is also available in YouTube TV3 Malaysia.

== Synopsis ==
Soffiya (Tiz Zaqyah), known as Yaya, is a vivacious and cheerful girl who lived in a village with her father, Sulaiman (Hilal Azman) a doctor and her mother, Aishah (Aisyah Atan), who had health problems.

Sulaiman was disappointed when he was often rejected by Aishah to be together. Couldn't resist his lustful desire any longer, Sulaiman raped his own daughter. Since then, Yaya was not allowed to go to school and was locked in the house. Sulaiman told the villagers that Yaya had begun to change since her illness allegedly caught with drugs. Yaya was desperate for help but no one will believe her stories.

Yaya's best friend, Muiz (Syazwan Zulkifli) was skeptical and tried to help her. But Muiz's efforts to save Yaya failed when he was killed while struggling with Sulaiman. Yaya was then brought to a woman's hut to be hidden, where she stayed for months and delivered her out-of-wedlock child (who died shortly after the birth). After her mother died, Yaya was brave enough to go against her father. Yaya defended herself when Sulaiman tried to rape her again and stabbed him repeatedly. He was killed.

Yaya was tried in court with the assistance of a young lawyer, Ilyas (Fizo Omar). She was convicted and detained in a juvenile center, where she had been a victim of bullying. Despite the hardships she endured, Yaya fell in love with Ilyas who never gave up trying to release her from that place.

Happiness didn't last long for Soffiya when Ilyas had to accede to the will of his fiancé Fiona (Izara Aishah) to follow her to New York. Ilyas left Soffiya without any message. After three years, Soffiya released and wanted to start a new life, calling herself Soffi.

Soffi was still looking for direction in her life when she met Kak Ton, who was an active participant in a charity organization. Kak Ton managed to gain her trust and the two finally became close friends. Kamal (Azhar Sulaiman) who was Kak Ton's friend and a frequent visitor to her stalls was attracted to Soffi's beauty and wanted to know her more closely.

Soffi's cold attitude and doubtfulness towards Kamal's real intention was a result to her refusing to be hurt and betrayed again. Thanks to Kak Ton (Halimatussadiah), Kamal's sincerity finally managed to open Soffi's heart and she finally accepted his proposal. Soffi was flooded with Kamal's love and was very touched when Kamal aided to fulfill her dream by setting up a charity body for women who were victimized like her before.

Not long after her marriage with Kamal, Soffiya was tested again when her first love, Ilyas appeared as a husband to his stepdaughter, Fiona. Fiona refused to accept Soffiya as a substitute for her mother and often sought ways to topple her. Fiona began to investigate Soffiya's background to be used against her. Ilyas was unable to contain the love and adoration to Soffiya when they met again, and always found himself defending her, causing him to argue numerous times with his wife.

== Cast ==
=== Main character ===
- Tiz Zaqyah as Soffiya
- Fizo Omar as Ilyas
- Azhar Sulaiman as Kamal
- Izara Aishah as Fiona

=== Extended cast ===
- Syazwan Zulkifly as Muiz
- Hilal Azman as Sulaiman
- Aisyah Atan as Aishah
- Halimatussadiah as Kak Ton
- Mardiana Azahari as Faizah
- Fyka as Alice
