= Nur Kasih =

2009 Malaysian television series

- Genre: Romance; Drama; Religion
- Written by: Mira Mustaffa
- Directed by: Kabir Bhatia; Faisal Ishak
- Starring: Remy Ishak; Fizz Fairuz; Tiz Zaqyah; Sharifah Sofia
- Opening theme: Nur Kasih - Yasin Sulaiman
- Ending theme: Nur Kasih - Yasin Sulaiman
- Country of origin: Malaysia
- Original language: Malay
- No. of seasons: 1
- No. of episodes: 26

Production
- Producers: Francis Foo; Kabir Bhatia; Mira Mustaffa
- Production locations: Kuala Lumpur, Malaysia
- Camera setup: multi-camera setup
- Running time: 37-42 minutes
- Production company: Filmscape

Original release
- Network: TV3
- Release: 29 May – 27 November 2009

Related
- Embun Mutiara; Aliff Firdaus

Nur Kasih (English: Light Of Love) is a 2009 Malaysian television series starring Tiz Zaqyah, Remy Ishak, Fizz Fairuz and Sharifah Sofia. It aired on TV3 from May 29, 2009 to November 27, 2009 every Friday at 21:00 (MST). The series was well received with an estimated 3.9 million viewers Malaysia-wide tuning in each week. TV3 estimated 5 million viewers tuned in to watch the final episode. The series was internationally known by Malaysians around the world.

== Synopsis ==
Nur Kasih is a story of two brothers, Aidil (Fizz Fairuz) and Adam (Remy Ishak), who are polar opposites: the former is a pious man who is respectful to his parents while the latter is a lost soul, living in Sydney, Australia as an architecture student. Since their childhood, Aidil has always been more responsible than Adam and he has the full trust of their parents, Ustaz Hassan and Hajjah Khadijah.

The village's imam, Ustaz Abu Bakar, has two daughters - Nur Amina (Tiz Zaqyah) and Siti Sarah (Ummi Nazeera). Nur is the best student in the village and has high hopes to continue her post-secondary education despite the family's poor finances, even applying for a scholarship (and was accepted) to study at the International Islamic University in Kuala Lumpur. But fate turns ugly when the family received a visit from Ustaz Hassan.

Unbeknown to his family, Ustaz Hassan has been suffering for years and it has taken a toll on him. We see the doctor telling him that he does not have long to live and to prepare for his going; the family calls their sons back home. Aidil who was studying in Al-Azhar University in Cairo, Egypt willingly went home but Adam was a bit reluctant to leave Sydney and his girlfriend, Katrina (Sharifah Sofia).

In Malaysia, the brothers return home to their dying father. Adam is grumpy and frequently lashes out at his family, blaming them for his being stuck in a village. Their father expressed a wish to see at least one of his sons married and asked Aidil if he had someone in mind. Without missing a beat, Aidil replied that he indeed had someone he was interested in: Nur Amina. Ustaz Hassan, however, had a different idea. On the day of engagement, he surprised them all with the decision to court Nur Amina not for Aidil, but for Adam. Even though he was disappointed, Aidil accepted his father's decision and tried to understand his father's wish to help Adam.

On their wedding night, Adam lashes out at Nur, saying that their entire marriage was a sham. He even insists that the marriage was her fault because whilst he had no choice but to follow his dying father's last wish, she had the choice to say no but she did not. He insults her further by saying that she is not his type.

After the death of Ustaz Hassan, Adam decides to return to Australia and leave Nur. Unwilling to bring shame to her family, Nur decides that she will leave the village and deceive her parents by saying she has gone to Australia but actually going to Kuala Lumpur. She sought the help of her old friend Nabila and enrolled in the International Islamic University, studying architecture. Aidil insisted on helping her but Nur refused, saying that it was better for everyone if nobody knew where she was. She continued living a lie for five years, completing her degree and working in an architectural firm in Kuala Lumpur.

Adam, on the other hand, lives a life of sin in Australia. Upon reaching Sydney, he was seen partying and going out drinking with his friends and girlfriend, Katrina (Adam is a Muslim and as such, drinking alcohol is a sin). He eventually proposes to Katrina, who had no clue that he had been married previously. Adam was promoted to vice-president of his architectural firm while Katrina found out she was pregnant. All was good in the southern hemisphere, but tragedy strikes when in the eighth month of pregnancy where Adam and Katrina gets into a car accident (brought on by Adam's drunk driving). As a result, Katrina lost her baby and Adam was sentenced to prison.

In prison, Adam reconnects back with his religion and reforms himself to be a better man. Pondering upon the life he had before prison, in which he sees as meaningless, he decides to bring Katrina back to Malaysia upon his release so that they would both go back living "on the straight path".

At the same time, Nur is grieving after her homesickness. Deciding that the charades was over, Nur headed on back to her village and was intent on telling her parents the truth about the last four years. As she was about to, she had a call from Aidil saying that Adam is coming home too.

== Cast ==
=== Main cast ===
- Tiz Zaqyah as Nur Amina bt. Abu Bakar

Nur Amina is a graduate from International Islamic University of Malaysia in the field of architecture and aspires to be a successful architect. The girl who grew up in Tanjung Karang, Selangor is to create a building that characterised Islam as she later graduated. She was born on 2 March and has a height of 5'3". Although mysterious, she appears to be very enthusiastic when performing tasks. In addition to her diligence, Nur likes to draw. Whatever the perceived beauty of God's creation Nur will draw. In addition to her friends, Nur is known as an excellent role model among her comrades. The nature of respect for the elderly and patience in the face of all the problems created Nur is very pleasing. Attitude of willingness to sacrifice for their loved ones make Nur was the son of the most loved by the pair of Imam Abu Bakar and Mak Ani. A firm believer in light of the principle there is no success without resistance, there is no happiness without sadness. The good and obedient daughter of Imam Abu Bakar. She was 18 years old when she married Adam Hj Hassan.[1]

- Remy Ishak as Adam Haji Hassan

Adam was the second son of Ustaz Hassan and Ustazah Khatijah. With a height of 5'9" and weighing 73 kg Adam is very interested by the village girls. Adam was little rebellious and not listening to his parents. He loves to go on the spree, but faithful to girlfriend named Katrina. Although Adam is naughty, he has high ambitions. Adam would like to open an architectural firm and is pursuing his master's degree at the University of Sydney, Australia. Although Adam was raised in a family that is strong on religious belief, Adam is a hot-tempered, arrogant person. He ignored the advice of his parents. Adam likes to act according to his heart and is very independent in daily life. Interested in soccer and unique architecture, he is very confident and no one can prevent his ambitions. Although Adam was not close to his father, he always respected his mother; his favourite food is shrimp sauce, cooked by his mother. He eventually becomes Nur's husband.[2]

- Fizz Fairuz as Aidil Haji Hassan

Aidil was the first son of Ustaz Hassan and Ustazah Khatijah. Aidil is a man who has a dream of every girl to be her wife. Aidil has high character and very responsible. Aidil is a son and brother, who is willing to put aside the happiness of family and self for the sake of his family. Her aims is to champion the cause of the oppressed to be a lawyer in syariah. Graduate degree from Al-Azhar University, Cairo is guided by the principle of "Work for the world your as you live forever, and work for eternity as if you die tomorrow." Aidil has vast knowledge in religion. Aidil loves to play ball and surf the Internet while reading a book. Although Aidil loved Nur Amina, Aidil allow Adam to marry her. Aidil Ustaz Hassan final will is more important than his feelings to Nur Amina. He later married Aleya, a sweet girl from a rich family whom he met while he was performing his umrah.[3]

- Sharifah Sofia as Katrina Anne Carlson

Katrina is very social and like to visit night clubs. She was born in Sydney, Australia is furthering her studies at the University of Sydney, Australia, in the arts. Katrina loves Adam and is willing to do anything for him. Katrina is an advisor to Adam when he has a problem. Attitude teasers, romantic and affectionate at Katrina that made Adam attracted. When Katrina graduated, she want to become a lecturer.

=== Extended cast ===
- Jalaluddin Hassan as Haji Hassan
- Rahim Omar as Imam Abu Bakar
- Sheila Mambo as Mak Ani
- Liza Othman as Hajjah Khadijah
- Ummi Nazeera as Siti Sarah Abu Bakar
- Ayu Raudhah as Aliya Dato' Afendi
- Nur Fathia Abdul Latiff as Nabila, Amina's best friend
- Salleh Mahfudz as Ikram
- Rose Iskandar as Ummu Majid
- Sami Mustaffa as Majid
- Hasnah Hasyim as Datin Munawaroh
- Irfan Roslan as Dato' Roslan
- Alif haikal as Adam

== Reception ==
The series was well received with an estimated 3.9 million viewers Malaysia-wide tuning in each week. TV3 estimated 5 million viewers tuned in to watch the final episode. The series was internationally known by Malaysians around the world.

However, there are issues, particularly in the light of the morality of the story in which, the use of religion to cover up lies and deceit.

== International Broadcasting ==
Indonesia

- Channel: B Channel
- Currently Broadcasting

Singapore

- Channel: TV Sensasi
- Currently Broadcasting

Brunei

- Channel:
- Currently Broadcasting

== Awards and nominations ==
Year	Award	Category	Recipient	Result
2010	Anugerah Skrin 2010	Best Sequence Drama	Nur Kasih	Won
2010	2010 Shout! Awards	Fresh TV Series	Nur Kasih	Won
2010	2010 Shout! Awards	Best On Screen Chemistry	Tiz Zaqyah and Remy Ishak	Nominated
