= TV Alhijrah =

Malaysian free-to-air Islamic television channel

- The current logo, an iteration of the 2010 logo, in use since 2013

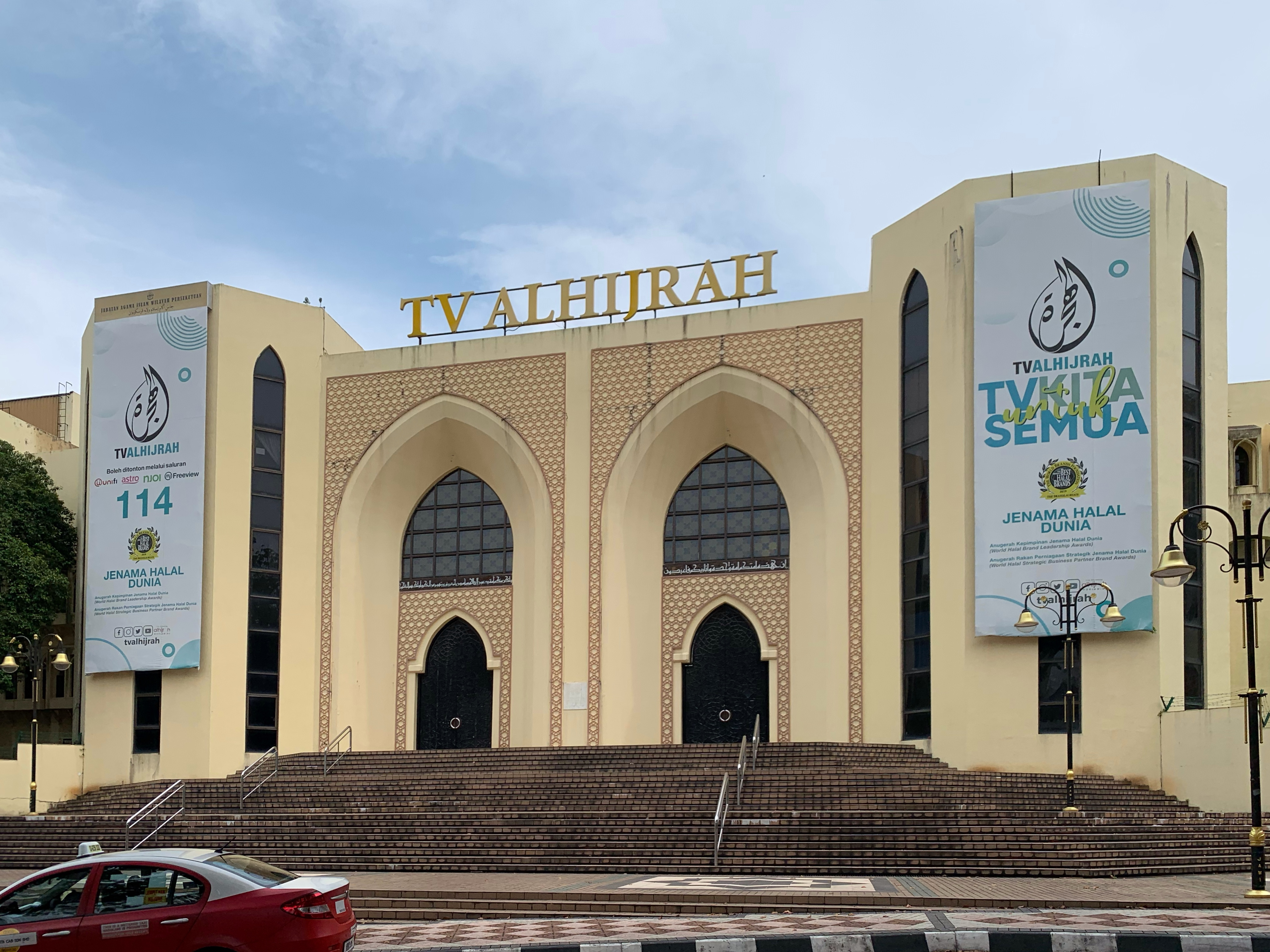
- TV Alhijrah headquarters in Kuala Lumpur, near the Masjid Negara
- Country: Malaysia
- Broadcast area: Malaysia; Singapore; Brunei; Thailand (South Thailand, particularly Songkhla, Narathiwat, Yala and Satun); Philippines (Balabac, Palawan and Tawi-Tawi); Indonesia (West Kalimantan, Riau Islands, North Kalimantan and Riau)
- Headquarters: Pusat Penyiaran Digital TV Alhijrah, Kompleks Pusat Islam, Jalan Perdana, 50480 Kuala Lumpur, Malaysia

Programming
- Languages: Malay; English; Arabic
- Picture format: 16:9 1080i HDTV; 16:9 576i SDTV

Ownership
- Owner: Alhijrah Media Corporation

History
- Launched: 7 December 2010; 15 years ago

Links
- Website: tvalhijrah.com

Availability

Terrestrial
- MYTV: Channel 114 (HD)

Streaming media
- MYTV: MYTV Mana Mana / Video On Demand
- TV AlHijrah: AlHijrah Plus

TV Alhijrah (stylized in capital letters; also abbreviated as TVAH) is a state-owned Malaysian free-to-air Islamic television channel, owned and operated by Al-Hijrah Media Corporation, a company under the purview of the Department of Islamic Development Malaysia of the Prime Minister's Department. It is the Malaysia's first full-fledged and sharia-compliance free-to-air Islamic television network and broadcasts from its headquarters in the Islamic Centre Complex, Kuala Lumpur.

== History ==
Plans to launch TV Alhijrah were revealed in June 2009, when the channel was still on the technical stage, and expected to go on air by mid-2010.

Few days before its official launch, TV Alhijrah came up with a new rebranding image, in which is "more creative and fresh" and a new corporate slogan, "Segalanya Bermula di Sini" (Everything Begins Here).

TV Alhijrah began its operations on 1 November 2010 on a trial basis. It was a government initiative to establish a channel based on Islam and to provide an Islamic perspective through its programs.

The station was officially launched on the 1st Muharram 1432H (7 December 2010) in a ceremony by the sixth Prime Minister, Najib Tun Razak. The event took place at the TV AlHijrah Digital Broadcasting Centre, Islamic Centre Complex, Kuala Lumpur.

In May 2011, TV Alhijrah entered a partnership with Universiti Sains Islam Malaysia (USIM) to help reimagining the Islamic propagation.

TV Alhijrah broadcasts 24 hours every day, and is watched globally for Muslim content, the latest news, political commentaries, educational material and Islamic-related entertainment. Starting on 1 June 2011, the channel is available on Astro platform.

On 1 January 2012, TV Alhijrah began daytime transmissions and extend its broadcast time from 12 to 18 hours, starting from 6 am to 12 am.

TV Alhijrah signed a Memorandum of Understanding (MoU) with the Makkah-based Gulf International Office (GIO) in July. The agreement gave the channel access to news and programming on five channels in Saudi Arabia.

By August, TV Alhijrah began to expand its broadcast area at the Northern territory following the launch of its transmitter.

In October, TV Alhijrah partnered with Peace TV from Dubai, United Arab Emirates to provide Islamic-themed content for mass audiences.

In November 2012, TV Alhijrah planned to began 24 hours of broadcast, pending the Government's approval. At the same time, its viewership average increased to 1.2 million viewers according to a survey by AC Nielsen.

The channel expand its broadcast area to Melaka and Tampin as early as March 2013.

The channel introduced its interactive portal in April 2015.

In July 2016, TV Alhijrah's new studio facility, known as the Alhijrah Big Studio (ABS) was launched and began operated on August 2 in Cyberjaya.

In 2020, TV Alhijrah celebrates 10th anniversary. The station also planned to become the host of the inaugural Islamic Media Awards, which was later cancelled.

In 2021, TV Alhijrah partnered with Palestine TV for news and current affairs partnership.

TV Alhijrah went on-air for 17 hours on 9 July 2022 in conjunction with the Arafah Day.

The station launched Wakaf Media in January 2026 to combining the concept of waqf with the Islamic preaching and broadcasting spheres.

Alhijrah Media Nexus, the station's backup centre, was officially launched on 18 June 2026 and officiated by Minister in the Prime Minister's Department (Religious Affairs), Zulkifli Hasan. The new facility is equipped with the Disaster Recovery Centre (DRC), which served as a backup plan and alternative operating site for the network.

== Management ==
The station's management team is headed by Namanzee Harris, who has bee its chief executive officer since 2019. The station is supervised by a board of directors.

== Flagship programmes ==
Some of TV Alhijrah's flagship programmes include:

- Assalamualaikum (Peace Be Upon You) – A breakfast television programme in the form of a talk show, discussing topics and issues related to Islam. First aired in 2011.
- Cinta Ilmu (Love Knowledge) – A programme discussing on various matters related to Islam, including manners and philosophy, featuring well-known Malaysian Muslim preachers in each episode. First aired in 2012.

== Awards and accolades ==
Year	Award-giving body	Category	Recipient	Result	Ref.
2019	The BrandLaureate World Halal BestBrands Awards 2019	World Halal Strategic Business Partner Brand Awards	TV Alhijrah	Won	
2021	The BrandLaureate The World's First E-Branding Award 2021	Business Strategic Partner Award	TV Alhijrah	Won	
2022	Indonesia Award Magazine 2022	No. 1 Asean Most Promising Islamic TV Station	TV Alhijrah	Won	
2023	Asia Achievement Excellence Award Winner 2023	Asia Excellence in Islamic & Multicultural Broadcasting	TV Alhijrah	Won	
2023	The World Islamic Tourism Awards 2023	Best Islamic Tourism TV Station	TV Alhijrah	Won	

== See also ==
- Islamic television networks
- TV9
- Astro Oasis
