= Astro Citra =

Malaysian television channel

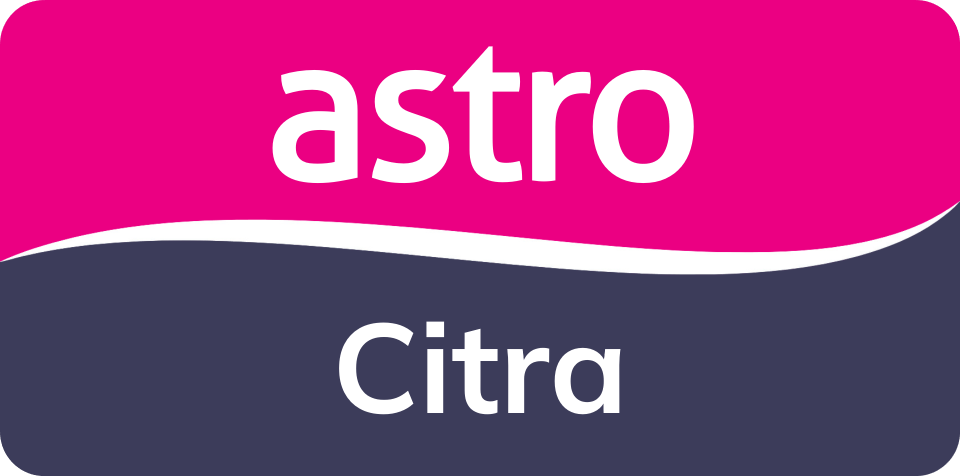
- Country: Malaysia
- Broadcast area: Malaysia; Singapore

Programming
- Languages: Malay; English
- Picture format: 16:9 HDTV (1080i)

Ownership
- Owner: Astro
- Sister channels: Astro Ria; Astro Prima; Astro Oasis; Astro Rania; Astro Aura

History
- Launched: 1 June 2009; 17 years ago (SD); 1 October 2018; 8 years ago (HD)
- Replaced: Astro Kirana; Astro Mustika HD; Astro Premier
- Closed: 18 May 2009; 17 years ago (Replacing Astro Kirana); 12 April 2021; 5 years ago (SD) (Astro & NJOI); 1 April 2022; 4 years ago (HD) (Kristal-Astro); 20 November 2024; 23 months ago (Replacing Astro Premier)

Astro Citra is a 24-hour Malay language version of HBO Asia, showing the local and Asian movies. The channel began broadcasting on 1 June 2009, replacing Astro Kirana (Channel 122) which ceased its broadcasting on 18 May 2009 due to low viewership. Most of the movies are available in Malay and English subtitles. It is only available on Astro Channel 108.

== History ==
The channel was launched on 1 June 2009 to replace Astro Kirana who had ceased 2 weeks earlier. The channel broadcasts genres that Astro Kirana broadcasts.

From 2012 to 2018, selected movies will be also aired in HD via Astro Mustika HD.

This channel was originally numbered channel 131, however it was changed to channel 108 on 1 April 2020.

== Mustika HD ==
Astro Mustika HD was a defunct channel launched on 20 May 2012 on channel 134, and was initially broadcasts Astro's Malay channels contents in HD. Prior to the existence of the channel, the main HD channel for Astro's Malay contents was available on channel 188, however the channel was only limited for selected events or festivals only. The channel was initially only available on Mustika Pack, and mainly broadcasts contents from the Mustika Pack, hence its name, however it was free for Astro subscribers who didn't subscribe to Mustika Pack until 31 August 2012. With the launch of Maya HD in June 2013, the channel continued to broadcast HD contents to channels targeting Malay viewers, limited to Mustika Pack, and the channel has rarely broadcasts contents outside Mustika Pack since then. The content of Astro Warna moved to its own HD channel on 11 May 2017, leaving the channel to only focus on Astro Citra & Astro Bella. On 1 October 2018, the channel was moved to channel 126 & became Astro Citra HD, while Astro Bella ceased transmission & was replaced by Naura on channel 125.

Mustika HD is also referred to as Astro Mustika, Mustika, Mustika HD & 134.

== Astro Premier ==
Astro Premier is an Astro television channel that features premium television series under the Astro Originals brand. Launched on 18 September 2023, the channel also features premium local and regional content that earned high viewership ratings — it includes some of the best movies, telefilms, and drama series. After more than 1 year of broadcasting, Now Astro Premier has officially ended its curtain on November 20, 2024, at 00:00. Meanwhile, the main content from Astro Premier will be switched to Astro Citra starting November 20, 2024.

== Logo history ==
Astro Citra HD logo (October 1, 2018 - November 19, 2024)

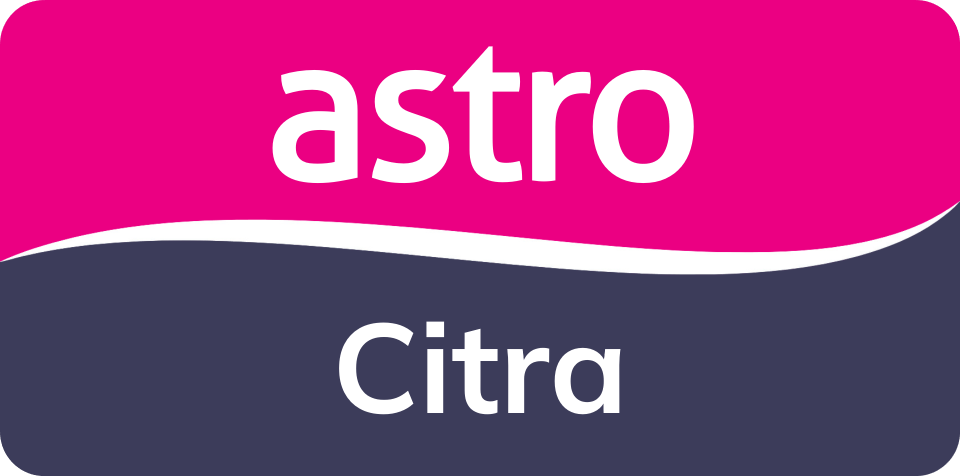
Astro Citra logo used since November 20, 2024
