= Astro Oasis =

Malaysian television station

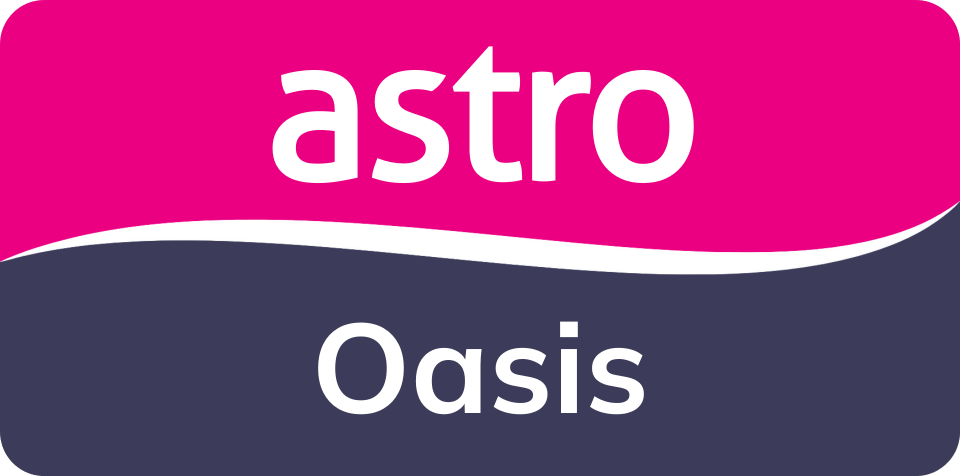
- Country: Malaysia
- Broadcast area: Malaysia, Brunei
- Headquarters: Bukit Jalil, Kuala Lumpur, Malaysia

Programming
- Languages: Malay; Arabic
- Picture format: 16:9 HDTV (1080i)

Ownership
- Owner: Astro
- Sister channels: Astro Ria; Astro Prima; Astro Citra; Astro Rania; Astro Aura

History
- Launched: 7 September 2007 (Indonesia); 13 October 2007 (Malaysia, SD); 1 October 2014 (HyppTV); 14 January 2019 (HD)
- Founder: Ananda Krishnan
- Replaced: Astro Maya HD
- Closed: 20 October 2008 (Indonesia); August 2016 (HyppTV); 12 April 2021 (SD) (Astro); 1 April 2022 (HD) (Kristal-Astro)

Astro Oasis is a Malaysian television station owned and operated by Astro. The channel broadcasts Islamic-related programmes. Its highest rated program is the reality TV series, Imam Muda.

Astro Oasis is currently available for free-to-view on Astro and NJOI in Malaysia on Channel 106 (HD).

== Logo history ==
Astro Oasis HD logo (14 January 2019 – 19 November 2024)

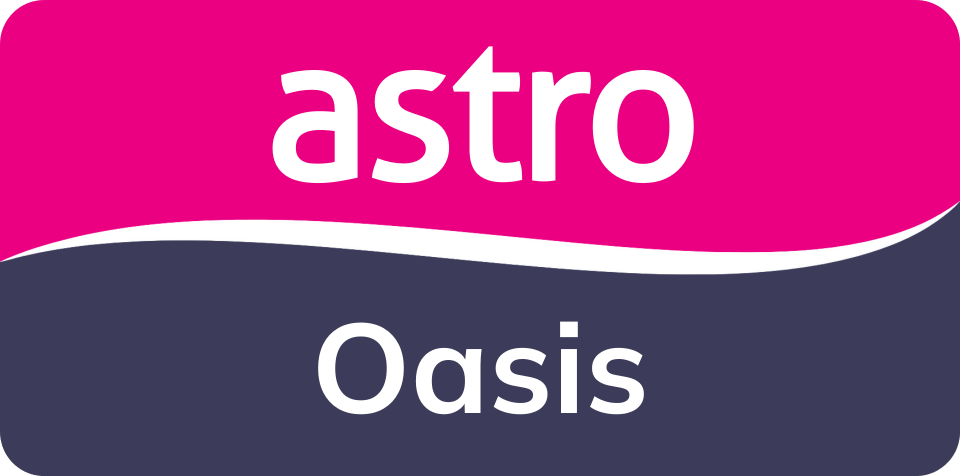
Astro Oasis logo used since 20 November 2024

== Programming ==
=== Dramas ===
- Bila Hati Telah Hitam
- Mail Dan Sudin Sambut Ramadan
- Tanah Kubur
- Insya Allah Ada Jalan (Indonesia)

=== Variety shows ===
- Salam Muslim
- Mimbar Pencetus Ummah S2 (also aired on Astro Prima and Astro Maya HD)
- Kalau Dah Jodoh... Ustaz Kazim Elias S2
- Jom Kongsi Bersama DMFK
- Taqwa
- Syamail: Kesempurnaan Rasulullah SAW
- Jejak Rasul
- Formula Anggun
- Arena Global
- Ar-Rayyan
- Hijrah Remaja
- Riwayat Kamil
- Halal BIO
- Forum Perdana
- Imam Muda
- Indahnya Iman
- Trek Global
- Cinta Madinah
- Masjid Agung Granada Spain

=== Sinetrons ===
- Keagungan Tuhan
- Al-Kautsar
- Kubersimpuh KepadaMu
- Pesantren Cinta
- Hafizah
- Sulaiman (Indonesia)

=== Animated and Kids ===
- Omar & Hana (Also aired on Astro Ceria and Astro Prima)

== Maya HD ==
Astro Maya HD was launched on 24 June 2013 and was focused on Astro's Malay channel contents, including from Astro TVIQ and Arena, to replace Mustika HD where the channel will be only focusing on Mustika pack channels. The channel was available on channel 135 and was included in the Family Pack. On 14 January 2019, the channel split into HD simulcast channels of Astro Prima and Astro Oasis, and moved from channel 135 to channel 121 and 122.

The channel is also referred to as Maya, Maya HD, Astro Maya and 135.
