= List of Malaysian films of 2012 =

This is a list of Malaysian films produced and released in 2012. Most of the film are produced in the Malay language, but there also a significant number of films that are produced in English, Mandarin, Cantonese, Hokkien and Tamil.

== 2012 ==
=== January – March ===
Opening		Title	Director	Cast	Genre	Notes	Ref.
J A N U A R Y	5	Sesuatu Yang Tertinggal	Asrull Hisyam	Zahiril Adzim, Sara Ali, Shera Aiyob, Namron	Horror	Grand Brilliance	
J A N U A R Y	12	Keramat	Azhari Mohd Zain	Zul Handyblack, Rebecca Nur Al Islam, Diana Amir, Alex Yanz, Putri Mardiana, Mon Ryanti, Adey Syafrien, Hairul Azreen	Horror	Metrowealth Pictures	
J A N U A R Y	19	Bujang Telajak	Abdul Razak Mohaideen	Saiful Apek, Nabil Ahmad, Johan Raja Lawak, Fazura, Mustapha Kamal	Comedy	LineClear Motion Pictures	
J A N U A R Y	19	Ah Beng The Movie : Three Wishes	Silver Yee	Jack Lim, Gan Mei Yan	Comedy	The Film Engine Cantonese-language film	
J A N U A R Y	26	Sumpahan Kum Kum	Ismail Bob Hasim	Fezrul Khan, Putri Mardiana, Wawa Zainal, Shima Anuar, Lydiawati	Horror	Metrowealth Pictures	
F E B R U A R Y	2	Azura	Aziz M. Osman	Neelofa, Shahz Jaszle, Afdlin Shauki, Erma Fatima	Drama / Romance	Ace Motion Pictures	
F E B R U A R Y	9	Hantu Dalam Botol Kicap	Azhari Mohd Zain	Wawa Zainal, Mikail Andre, Mon Ryanti, Zalif Sidek, Epy Raja Lawak, Azrol Anwar, Angah Raja Lawak	Comedy / Horror	Metrowealth Pictures	
F E B R U A R Y	16	Chantek	Pierre Andre	Pierre Andre, Maimon Mutalib, Nurul Ekasari, Kim Watt, Abon	Drama / Romance	Empat Semudra Plantation	
F E B R U A R Y	23	Adnan Sempit 2	Ismail Bob Hasim	Shaheizy Sam, Intan Ladyana, Yana Samsudin, Angah Raja Lawak Along Raja Lawak, Ahmad Tarmimi Siregar, Aznah Hamid	Comedy	Metrowealth Pictures; Preceded by Adnan Sempit (2010)	
F E B R U A R Y	23	Fist of Dragon	Michael Chuah	Michael Chuah, Steve Yap, Fiona Xie, Henry Thia, Wang Xiao-chen	Action / Martial Arts	Evo Pictures; Mandarin-language film	
M A R C H	1	Cinta Kura-Kura	Nizam Zakaria	Aeril Zafrel, Tiz Zaqyah, Zizan Razak, Shy8, Farah Fauzana, Bob AF2, Fizz Fairuz, Harun Salim Bachik, Norhayati Taib, Munir	Comedy / Romance	KRU Studios	
M A R C H	8	Bunohan	Dain Said	Faizal Hussein, Zahiril Adzim, Pekin Ibrahim, Wan Hanafi Su, Bront Palarae, Namron, Sofi Jikan	Action / Drama	Apparat	
M A R C H	8	SeeFood	Goh Aun Hoe	Gavin Yap, Diong Chae Lian	Adventure / Comedy / Animation	Silver Ant; English-language film	
M A R C H	15	7 Petala Cinta	Azhari Mohd Zain	Aeril Zafrel, Diana Amir, Fizo Omar, Shima Anuar, Putri Mardiana	Drama / Romance	Metrowealth Pictures	
M A R C H	22	Jidin Sengal	Esmi Zahara Yusof	Angah Raja Lawak, Along Raja Lawak, Azrul Raja Lawak, Zac Diamond, Faezah Elai, Jue Aziz	Comedy / Romance	Outloud Studios	
M A R C H	29	Jangan Pandang-Pandang	Ahmad Idham	Zizan Razak, Sara Ali, Nas-T, Miera Leyana, Anith Aqilah, Azhar Sulaiman	Comedy	Excellent Pictures	

=== April – June ===
Opening		Title	Director	Cast	Genre	Notes	Ref.
A P R I L	5	3 Temujanji	Hashim Rejab	Yana Samsudin, Pierre Andre, Kamal Adli, Diana Amir	Comedy / Romance	Metrowealth Pictures	
A P R I L	19	Uncle Usin	Husri Husain	Zizan Razak, Johan Raja Lawak, Nabil Ahmad, Shiqin Kamal, Ebby Yus	Action / Comedy	Sketch Seven	
A P R I L	26	Berani Punya Budak	Afdlin Shauki	Afdlin Shauki, Nabil Ahmad, Johan Raja Lawak, Awie, Adlin Aman Ramli, Sharifah Sofia	Action / Comedy	Ismail Holding & Vision Works	
M A Y	3	Chow Kit	Rosihan Zain, Brando Lee	Beto Kusyairi, Dira Abu Zahar, Muhamad Izzam Izzudin, Muhamad Izzam Syafiq, Muzhaffar Shah Shahrul Asran, Nur Nadzirah Rosi, Mers Sia	Action / Crime	Grand Brilliance	
M A Y	10	Nongkrong	Ismail Bob Hasim	Shaheizy Sam, Angah Raja Lawak, Epy Kodiang	Comedy / Horror	Metrowealth Pictures	
M A Y	10	Ghost Buddies	Simon Sek	Mark Lee, Maggie Shiu Mei Kei, Vivian Tok, Lim Ching Miau	Comedy / Horror	Double Vision Pictures; Mandarin-Hokkien-language film	
M A Y	17	Mantera	Mohd Aliyar Al-Kutthy	Tomok, Shiqin Kamal, Kamaliya, Wael Al-Masri, Said Dashuk-Nighmatulin, Mikhail Dorojkin, Faezah Elai, Yank Kassim	Science Fiction / Fantasy	Flare Studios Malay- English-language film	
M A Y	17	You Believe In Ghost?	M. Subash Abdullah	Eric Chen, Rabbit Chen, Yow Lan	Horror	Genius Parade; Mandarin-language film	
M A Y	24	Aku Ada, Kau Ada???	Rahila Ali	Yana Samsudin, Shaheizy Sam, Kamal Adli	Comedy / Romance / Musical	Pencil Pictures	
M A Y	24	Hoore! Hoore!	Saw Teong Hin	Akim, Kilafairy, Nurfarah Nazirah, Harun Salim Bachik, Adibah Noor, Sahronozam Noor, Aznil Nawawi, Fauziah Nawi	Romance / Musical	Astro Shaw-Real Pictures co-production	
M A Y	31	Man Sewel Datang KL	Rahman Adam	Shuib Sepah, Julia Ziegler, Razali Hussain, Siti Sarah Raisudin, Rafidah Ibrahim	Comedy	Work Move Productions	
M A Y	31	Gerimis Mengundang	Ahmad Idham	Kamal Adli, Olivia Jensen Lubis	Romance / Musical	E-Rama Creative; Adapted from the play of the same name	
J U N E	7	X	Ahmad Rusli Mohamed Khadri	Pierre Andre, Diana Amir, Intan Ladyana, Nuremynadia Ramli, Siti Chubby	Comedy / Romance	Metrowealth Pictures	
J U N E	7	Jalan Kembali: Bohsia 2	Syamsul Yusof	Salina Saibi, Nabila Huda, Syamsul Yusof, Sofi Jikan, Zizan Razak, Hetty Sarlene, Harun Salim Bachik	Drama / Crime	Skop Productions-Primeworks Studios; Preceded by Bohsia: Jangan Pilih Jalan Hitam (2009)	
J U N E	14	Jiwa Taiko	Osman Ali	Remy Ishak, Diana Danielle, Nadiya Nisaa, Bront Palarae, Fizz Fairuz, Mislina Mustafa	Action / Drama	Nuansa Production	
J U N E	14	Tears of the Mom	Yoko Chou	Amber Chia, Yap Chou Chuen, Johnson Low, Anita Phang, Hero Tai, Kimura Takahiro, Azzaly Ismail	Drama / Romance / Family	Shining Production; Mandarin-language film	
J U N E	21	Hanya Aku Cinta Kau Seorang	Ahmad Rusli Mohamed Khadri	Aeril Zafrel, Nuremynadia Ramli, Fezrul Khan, Mon Ryanti, Liza Abdullah	Romance	Metrowealth Pictures	
J U N E	21	Mael Lambong	Ahmad Idham	Zizan Razak, Juliana Evans, Taiyuddin Bakar, Shenthy Feliziana	Action	Excellent Pictures	
J U N E	28	Baik Giler!!	Mansor Akob	Zizan Razak, Awie, Farawahida, Justin Choo, Esma Daniel, Sharifah Shahirah, Abon, Kenchana Dewi	Comedy	Layar Dimensi	
J U N E	28	Aku, Kau dan Dia	Pierre Andre	Remy Ishak, Sharifah Zarinatasha, Pekin Ibrahim, Marisa Yasmin, Harun Salim Bachik, Pierre Andre	Drama / Romance	Tayangan Unggul	

=== July – September ===
Opening		Title	Director	Cast	Genre	Notes	Ref.
J U L Y	5	8 Jam	Ahmad Idham	Shaheizy Sam, Yana Samsudin, Fimie Don, Erynne Erynna, Lydiawati, Eizlan Yusof, Aziz Singah	Action / Drama	Metrowealth Pictures	
J U L Y	12	Momok Jangan Cari Pasal!	M. Jamil	M. Jamil, Sheril Aida, Wan Raja, Myza Aryqa, P. Prem Anand Pillai, Ruminah Sidek	Comedy / Thriller / Musical	Galaksi Seni	
J U L Y	26	Karma Reborn	M. Subash Abdullah	Susan Leong, Rabbit Chen, Eric Chen, Mak Jah, Alice Yap	Thriller / Horror / Suspense	Genius Parade; Cantonese-language film	
A U G U S T	9	Hantu Gangster	Namewee	Namewee, Farid Kamil, Diana Danielle	Comedy / Horror	Prodigee Media	
A U G U S T	19	SAM	Syafiq Yusof	Shaheizy Sam, Lisa Surihani, Syamsul Yusof, Neelofa, Azad Jasmin	Thriller / Romance	Skop Productions	
A U G U S T	19	Seram Sejuk	Azhari Mohd Zain	Angah Raja Lawak, Zul Handyblack, Wawa Zainal, Eddy Afro, Fyza Kadir	Comedy / Horror	I-Insan Multimedia	
A U G U S T	30	Leftwings	Faisal Chal Ahmad	Aweera, Zouladeq, Wan Zaimie, Paly Rockstars, Ebi Kornelis, Shiqin Kamal	Musical	Bagus Tiasa	
A U G U S T	30	29 Februari	Edry Abdul Halim	Remy Ishak, Jojo Goh, Izzue Islam	Drama	KRU Studios	
S E P T E M B E R	6	Salam Cinta	Azhari Mohd Zain	Kamal Adli, Diana Amir, Razak Ahmad	Romance	Metrowealth Pictures	
S E P T E M B E R	6	Hantu Air	Murali Abdullah	Saiful Apek, Hairi Safwan, Nisha Dir	Comedy / Horror	Multimedia Entertainment	
S E P T E M B E R	13	Halim Munan	Hashim Rejab	Fizo Omar, Zul Handyblack, Intan Ladyana	Comedy / Horror	RR Empire	
S E P T E M B E R	13	Kepong Gangster	Teng Bee	Melvin Sia, Henley Hii, Hero Tai, Rayz Lim, Billy Ng	Action / Crime	Mahu Pictures; Mandarin-, Cantonese-language film	
S E P T E M B E R	20	Untuk Tiga Hari	Afdlin Shauki	Afdlin Shauki, Rashidi Ishak, Vanida Imran, Ayu Raudhah	Drama / Romance	Astro Shaw	
S E P T E M B E R	20	Aji Noh Motor	Mohd Razif Rashid	Alex Yanz, Zalif Sidek, Wawa Zainal, Epy Raja Lawak	Comedy	MIG Pictures	
S E P T E M B E R	27	Hantu Kapcai	Ghaz Abu Bakar	Zizan Razak, Fizz Fairuz, Remy Ishak, Hairul Azreen, Izzue Islam, Neelofa	Comedy / Horror	KRU Studios	
S E P T E M B E R	27	Sofazr The Movie: Jiwa Kacau	Tauke Raja Lawak, Isma AF7	Wan Shahbaharin Niktah, Wan Shah Baharom Niktah, Ahmad Fairouz Mohamad, Amir Mahiyidin, Zarimi Zahari, Rodie Jamun, Angah Raja Lawak, Along Raja Lawak, Azrul Raja Lawak, Tauke Raja Lawak, Jep Sepah, Mamat Sepah, Saiful Apek, Hamid Gurkha, Yassin	Comedy / Horror	Nusanbakti Corporation	

=== October – December ===
Opening		Title	Director	Cast	Genre	Notes	Ref.
O C T O B E R	4	Taikun	Ismail Bob Hasim	Angah Raja Lawak, Along Raja Lawak, Alex Yanz, Zul Suphian, Adey Syafrien	Action / Comedy	MIG Production	
O C T O B E R	4	Ngorat	Abdul Razak Mohaideen	Iedil Putra, Aaron Aziz, Erra Fazira	Comedy / Romance	Primeworks Studios	
O C T O B E R	11	Aku Terima Nikahnya	Eyra Rahman	Ady Putra, Nora Danish	Romance	Metrowealth Pictures	
O C T O B E R	11	Cinta Beruang	Ramanarayanan	Nabil Ahmad, Jue Aziz, Tauke Raja Lawak, Ropie Cecupak, Sathiya	Comedy	Fantastic Villa	
O C T O B E R	18	PE3	Farid Kamil	Farid Kamil, Kamal Adli, Diana Amir	Action / Comedy	Metrowealth Pictures	
O C T O B E R	18	Vajram	M. Subash Abdullah	M. Suurya, Yasmin Khanif, Mislina Mustaffa, Mariani	Romance	Genius Parade; Tamil-language film	
O C T O B E R	25	Apa Celop Toqq...	Ahmad Idham	Hazama Azmi, Taiyuddin Bakar, Intan Ladyana, Shenthy Feliziana, Azad Jasmin	Comedy / Romance	Excellent Pictures	
N O V E M B E R	1	Budak Pailang	Hashim Rejab	Aeril Zafrel, Wawa Zainal, Niezam Zaidi, Zalif Sidek, Epy Raja Lawak	Action	MIG Pictures	
N O V E M B E R	1	Zaiton: Ceritaku	Esma Daniel	Nadia Aqilah	Drama	Bruang Film	
N O V E M B E R	8	Aji Boy	Ismail Bob Hasim	Rykarl Iskandar, Zalif Sidek, Epy Raja Lawak, Angah Raja Lawak, Adibah Yunus	Comedy	MIG Pictures	
N O V E M B E R	8	Istanbul, Aku Datang	Bernard Chauly	Lisa Surihani, Beto Kusyairy, Tomok, Aizat Amdan	Comedy / Romance	Primeworks Studios-Red Films co-production	
N O V E M B E R	15	War of the Worlds: Goliath	Joe Pearson	Tony Eusoff, Jim Byrnes, Joey D'Auria, Matt Letscher, Adam Baldwin, Adrian Paul, Elizabeth Gracen, Mark Sheppard, Rob Middleton, Peter Wingfield	Action / Science Fiction / Animation	Tripod Entertainment; English-language film	
N O V E M B E R	22	Pontianak vs Orang Minyak	Afdlin Shauki	Nabil Ahmad, Johan Raja Lawak, Afdlin Shauki, Khir Rahman, Lana Nordin, Adibah Noor	Comedy	Vision Works	
N O V E M B E R	29	Sepah The Movie	MP Roslin Md Sharif	Jep Sepah, Shuib Sepah, Mamat Sepah, Anzalna Nasir, Jehan Miskin	Comedy / Romance	PTV Film Production	
N O V E M B E R	29	Lagenda Budak Setan II: Katerina	Sharad Sharan	Farid Kamil, Maya Karin, Bront Palarae	Drama / Romance	Astro Shaw; Preceded by Lagenda Budak Setan (2010)	
D E C E M B E R	6	Strawberi Cinta	Ahmad Rusli Mohamed Khadri	Pierre Andre, Yana Samsudin, Diana Amir	Romance	MIG Pictures	
D E C E M B E R	6	Adutha Khattam	Muralikrishnan Munian	Devendran Arunasalam, Gantiban Ben, Malar Meni Perumal, Aghonderan Sahadevan, Sasitharan Rajoo	Thriller / Horror	NGP Film; Tamil-language film	
D E C E M B E R	13	The Golden Couple	Ah Niu	Mike He, Fiona Xie, Steve Yap	Comedy / Romance	Asia Tropical Films; Mandarin-language film	
D E C E M B E R	20	Adik Manja Returns	Dharma Harun Al Rashid	Dharma Harun Al Rashid, Faezah Elai, Juliana Evans, Rozita Che Wan, Jihan Raja Lawak	Comedy	Adik Manja	
D E C E M B E R	20	The Collector	James Lee	Chew Kin Wah, Kwai Yuen, Jack Lim, Sunny Pang, Ramana Mohan, Nigel Kok, Yeo Yann Yann, Patrick Teoh	Action / Comedy	Tayangan Unggul; Mandarin-, Cantonese-language film	
D E C E M B E R	27	Kahwin 5	Nizam Zakaria	Shy8, Dian P. Ramlee, Adrea Abdullah, Norish Karman, Fizz Fairuz, Sofi Jikan, Anzalna Nasir, Marsha Milan Londoh	Comedy / Romance	KRU Studios	
D E C E M B E R	27	Prince of the City	Roslan Hussin	Julian Cheah, Michael Madsen, Aaron Aziz, Jehan Miskin	Action	Axis Line Entertainment; English-language film	
