= Bell Ngasri =

Malaysian actor and comedian (born 1980)

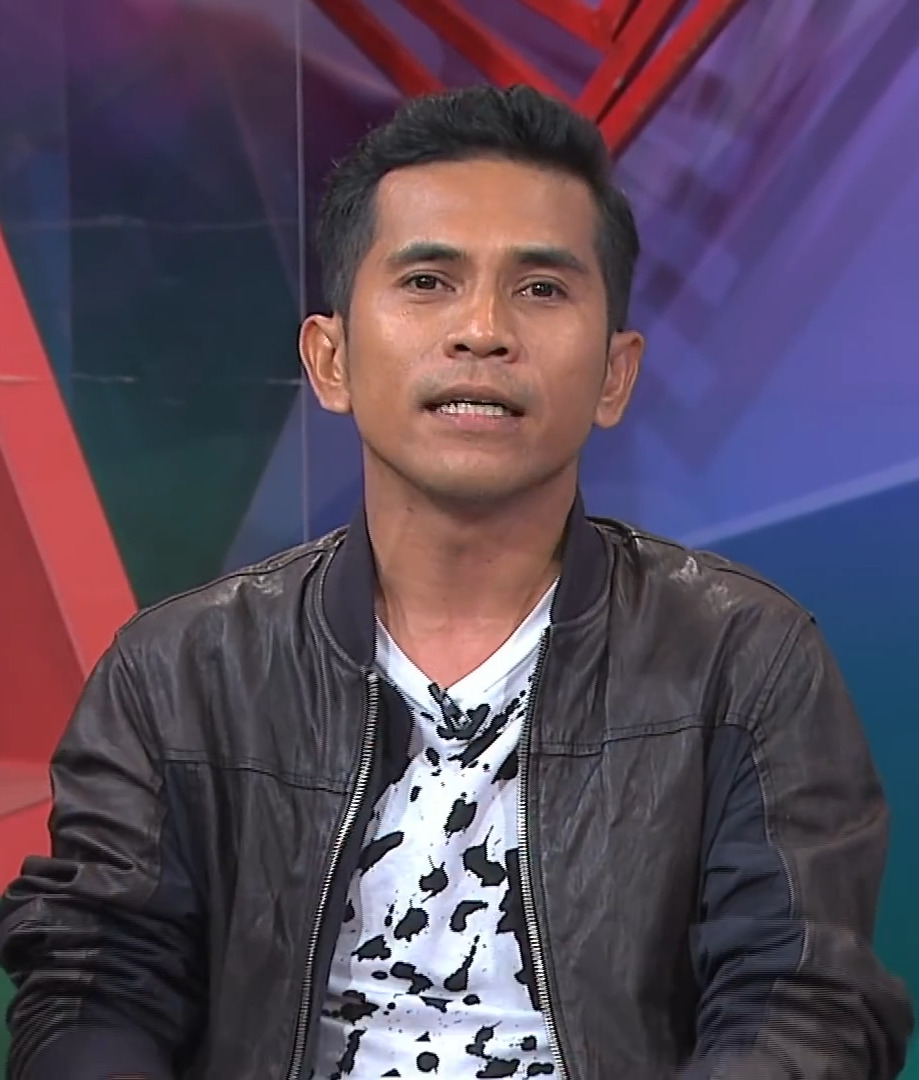
- Born: Ngasrizal bin Ngasri; 30 August 1980; Petaling Jaya, Selangor , Malaysia
- Other names: Barkoba; Pak Ngas; YakYak Yeah
- Occupations: Comedian; Actor; Host
- Years active: 1986-present
- Spouse: Nur Farhana Mahamad Fauri (m. 2007)
- Children: 3

Nasrizal bin Ngasri (born 30 August 1980) better known as Bell Ngasri is a Malaysian actor and comedian. He began his career as a child actor, and is known for his ability to play with the audience's emotions through his various acting roles.

== Early life ==
He was born on 30 August 1980 at Assunta Hospital, Petaling Jaya, Selangor. He is the third of six children born to former radio presenter and voice recording artist Ngasri Sain and his wife, actress Habibah Jaafar. His younger siblings are also involved in acting. After obtaining his Malaysian Certificate of Education (SPM), Nasrizal continued his studies to the Diploma level in broadcasting at the TV3 Academy.

Nasrizal began his acting career during his preschool days. He was first introduced to the silver screen in the film Yassin (1988) directed by Tan Sri Kamarul Ariffin when he was 7 years old.

In 1988, he and his two sisters, Nasreen (Darling) and Naszriah (Anne) starred in commercials before their talent was spotted by drama producers at RTM and TV3. In 1992, Nasrizal acted in the dramas Dam Dam Dum and Cinta Mastura, both of which were broadcast on TV1. For his performance in Cinta Mastura, he was nominated for the Best Supporting Actor category at the 1992 Seri Angkasa Awards. He played an additional role as Kassim in the film Perempuan, Isteri & .....? (1993) starring Sofia Jane and Nasir Bilal Khan. It also starred his two sisters, Darling and Anne.

== Filmography ==
=== Film ===
Year	Title	Character	Note
1988	Yassin		First film as Kids actor
1993	Perempuan, Isteri &amp; .....?	Kassim	Additional cast
1995	Cinta Kita	Epi	
1997	Puteri Impian	Anak yatim	
2001	Kaki Bakar	Kesuma	
2002	Cinta 200 Ela	Din	
2004	Bisikan Remaja	Mustafa Ayoub @ Bob	
2005	Salon	Asmadie	
2006	Castello	Nik	
2006	Cinta	Amin	
2007	1957: Hati Malaya	Sardon Jubir	
2008	Antoofighter: Amukan Drakulat!	Opie	
2010	Kecoh Betul	Joe	
2010	Kapoww	Aboo	
2011	Tolong Awek Aku Pontianak	Pembantu Pak Harun	
2011	Al-Hijab	Pemuda 1	
2013	Langgar	Khairul	
2013	Tanda Putera	Datuk Seri Haji Harun Idris	
2013	Balada Pencinta	Jenal	
2014	Amir dan Loqman Pergi ke Laut	Dirinya sendiri	Cameo
2015	Rumah Pusaka Di Simpang Jalan	Markona	
2015	Cicak Man 3	Jojo	
2015	Jejak Warriors	Rahim	
2017	Pak Pong	Orang Kampung	Cameo
2019	Bella &amp; Jamie	Jay	
2019	Hero: Jangan Bikin Panas	Ahmad Mustar	
2020	Bulan dan Pria Terhebat	Arab	
2021	18 Puasa di Kampong Pisang	Barkoba	
2021	Kampong Pisang Musikal Raya Istimewa	Barkoba	
2021	Jangan Takut: Kau Takut Aku Pun Takut	Pengurus Produksi	
2021	Kampung Latah Kena Kuarantin	Abon	
2021	Kampong Pisang Kita Setandan	Barkoba	Short Film
2022	Gracias Barcelona	Azraf	
2022	Kampong Pisang Berbuah Dua Kali	Barkoba	
2022	Showtime 1958	Aziz Sattar	
2022	Kampung Latah The Mummy	Abon	
2022	Seratus	Abang Din	Cameo
2023	Penanggal Mak Kiah	Budin	
2023	Sumpahan Malam Raya	Ujang	Cameo
2023	Gui	Zain	
2023	Geng Sakau Vs Hantu Ting Tong	Amir	
2023	Hilang		Tonton Original
2024	Jangan Lupa Aku Cinta Padamu		
2024	Pemburu Saka		
2024	19 Puasa: Playboys Of Plestik Hitam	Dak Ngas / Barkoba	
2024	Zim Zim Ala Kazim	Bell	
2024	Siapa Buka Lampu	Anurak	
2024	Harimau Malaya: The Untold Journey	Badar	
2025	6 Jilake	Kasturi	
TBA	Tarung: Unforgiven		Pre-production

=== Drama ===
Year	Title	Character	Channel	Note
1993	Ada Ada Saja	Nabil	TV2	First drama
1994	Keluarga Ria: Kedai Kopi	Helmi	TV1	
1995	Sendaloka: IQ Genius	Yusri	TV1	
1995-1997	Nur Hikmah	Syafiq	TV2	
1998–2001	Idaman	Amran	Astro Ria	
2004–2005	Kekawan	Boy	TV2	
2004	Gerak Khas (Musim 6)		TV2	Episode : Buli
2004	Begitulah Cinta		TV3 / RCTI	On air in Indonesia
2007	Kerana Karina	Boy	Tonton	Web drama
2007	Salam Pantai Timur		TV1	
2008	Novel Latifah		TV1	
2008	KL Menjerit The Series	Bell	Astro Ria	
2008	Pepaya	Mat Senoi	TV3	
2009	Chef Jo	Azman	TV3	
2009	Ejen 008		TV3	
2009	Senario	Multiple character	TV3	
2009	Keliwon (Season 1)	Ismail	TV3	Episode: "Pulut Kuning"
2009	Nabil & Co.		TV9	
2009	Tok Ketua	Nassim	Astro Warna	Sitcom
2010	Gerak Khas (Season 12)	Sani	TV2	Episode: "Suspek"
2010	Jidin	Dazur	TV3	
2010	Ahmad Durrah	Juki	TV3	
2010	Hani	Tajul	TV3	
2011	Antara Maghrib Dan Isyak		TV3	
2011	Kias Ramadan	Khuzaimi	TV3	Episode: "Lejen Raya"
2014	Sepai	Putat	TV1	
2014	Bedah Vs Joyah	Syak/Zamri	TV9	
2015	Edisi Khas Multiple character	TV3		
2015	Pengembaraan Jason Murad	Hamdan	TV9	
2016	Aku Bukan Bimbo	Azrul	Astro Ria	
2016	Bibik-Bibikku	En Zami	TV3	
2016	Diari Cinta Kita	Herman	TV9	
2017	Gerak Khas (Musim 17)	Joko	TV2	Episode: "Love Scam"
2017	Joyah The Series	Syak/Zamri	TV9	
2017	Ops Cinta Din Sardin	Azam	TV9	
2017	Muzium Misteri	Shah	TV3	
2018	Shah &amp; Zam	Shah	TV3	
2018	Joyah	Syak & Zamri	TV9	
2018	Suriram	Akhbar	Astro Prima	
2018–2019	Misteri Jenazah	Arman	Astro Prima	
2019	Kereta Sewa		TV3	
2019	Iktibar	Iqbal	TV3	Episode: "Tamak Haloba"
2020	Cinta Pedia	Doktor Cinta	TV Okey	
2020	Uncle Security	Angel	D Ayu Pictures	Short Drama
2020	Cikgu Ganti Dari Kampung	Bell Loceng	Astro Ceria	Short Drama
2020	One Two Hantu		Awesome TV	
2020	Ah How Putus Cinta	Saidin	Awesome TV	
2020	U-Turn Ke Syurga	Rumi	Awesome TV	
2020	Pak Kodi 5G (Musim 1)		TV3	Cameo
2020	Isteri Misteri	Guard	Viu	
2020	Kampong Pisang Bersiri-siri	Barkoba	Astro Citra	
2021	Jenaka Kampung Kalut (J.K.K 6)	Malik	TV3	Episode: "Homestay"
2021	Hantu Van Sewa		Awesome TV	
2021	Sis Stars Hotel	Baharom	Awesome TV	
2021	Keluarga Instafamous		Awesome TV	
2021	Geng Gajet	Bob	Astro Ceria	
2021	Jom Mak, Raya KL!	Rafiq	TV3	
2021	B.T.S. – Bujang. Tampan. Selamba.	Tommy	TV9	
2021	Layan Lockdown	Amy	Awesome TV	Sitcom
2022	Cinta Amnesia	Latef	TV3	
2022	Mem &amp; Bibik Bibik	Bibik Rocky	TV3	
2022	Melodi Raya: MELO'DRAMA'DI Raya	Budin	TV3	Special Appearance
2022	Pekan Kecil Kampung Terpencil	Amin J	TV1	
2023	Geng Daddy Daddy	Iskandar	TV3	
2023	Presiden Kampung Morten	Man Tapau	Tonton	
2023	Misi Seramedi	Abu	TV Okey	
2023	Bang... Maznah Datang...	Wancho	Awesome TV	
2023	Inspektor Babyface	Helmi	TV2	
2023	Hikayat Pak Belalang	Pak Belalang	Astro Ceria	
2024	Gadis dan Angan Angan	Cikgu Bahasa Melayu	TV3	
2024	Kampung Puasa		Astro Ceria	
2025	Geng D.U.I.T	Ustaz Aiman	Astro Ceria	
2025	Jutawan Ekspres	Yusni	Astro Ceria	
2025	Hikayat Batu Belah Batu Bertangkup	Tok Tok	Astro Ceria	

=== Telefilm ===
Year	Title	Character	Channel	Remark
1991	Ipin		TV1	First Telefilm
1992	Dam Dam Dum	Fikri	TV1	
1992	Cinta Mastura	Fahmi	TV1	
1993	Bunga-Bunga Pulau		TV1	
1996	YB & Thuraya		TV3	
1998	Pa'e	Zulkifli @ Ajoi	TV3	
2000	Ramadan Yang Lepas		TV3	
2002	Demi		VCD	
2003	Neon	Tokan	VCD	Special Appearance
2003	Paling Comel	News Anchor	VCD	
2003	Bukan Ku Pinta		TV3	
2003	Amukan Puaka		VCD	
2004	See You Di IPT	Norman	VCD	
2004	Syurga Di Mana	Hisham	TV3	
2005	Sutun	Shamsul	Astro Ria	
2005	Jalil Ju	Zik	TV1	
2006	Anak Kerbau Mati Emak	Tawil	TV1	
2008	Cinta Keropok Lekor	Khairil	TV3	
2008	Merdeka Ajis Merdeka Ajit	Ajis	TV3	
2011	Cinta Buta		TV3	
2011	Ku Hijrahkan Doa		TV9	
2011	Sekering Jiwa Ante	Hamzah	TV9	
2012	Suami Terpuji	Muda	TV9	
2012	Bedah Tong Gas	Zamri	TV9	
2012	Bedah Tong Gas Nak Raya	Zamri	TV9	
2012	Bila Joyah Masuk TV	Syak Wasangka Daud	TV9	
2012	Bila Joyah Jadi Jutawan	Syak	TV9	
2012	Anakku Ghazali	Ghazali	TV9	
2012	Pendekar Durian Lempuk	Tirikh	Astro Prima	
2013	Bedah Tong Gas Muflis	Zamree	TV9	
2013	Mana Kuali Opah?	Suffian	TV9	
2013	Adi & Meon	Meon	TV2	
2013	Kompang Abang Zabidi		Astro Warna	
2014	Tingkat Atas Tingkat Bawah	Razman	TV9	
2014	Bila Joyah Dah Goyah	Syak	TV9	
2015	Joyah Tak Balik Malam Raya	Syak	TV9	
2015	Akhil Yang Bakhil	Mat Din	TV9	
2015	Pagar	Dollah	TV3	
2015	Kerana Lemang	Ajis	TVi	
2016	Cintaku Terkail		TV9	
2016	Kaki Kipas	Shah	TV9	
2016	Dari Asar Ke Isyak		TV2	
2016	Rongples Rongtaim	Akmal	Astro Citra	
2016	Saka Ke Ni?	Din	TV9	
2016	Ok Bah Kalau Kau		TV3	
2017	Saling	Ajun	TV1	
2017	Awak Kat Mana?		TV9	
2017	16 Puasa	Ngas	Astro First Exclusive	
2017	Rindu Yang Tertunda	Ibrahim	TV1	
2017	Kalut Nak Raya	Jeff	Astro Warna	
2018	Din Sardin Beraya	Azam	TV3	
2018	Wan Peah Balik Beraya		TV3	
2018	Pengantin Lari Culik Artis		Astro Citra	
2019	17 Puasa	Ngasri	Astro First Exclusive	
2019	Saya Jual Ye Bang		Astro First Exclusive	
2019	Mana Ada Hantu Malam Raya	Sudin	TV2	
2019	Gunting Bhavana	Sufian	TV3	
2020	Terlajak Subuh	Zam	TV1	
2021	Lagenda Puteri Bulan	Laksamana	Astro Ceria	
2021	Mache Fusion	Chef Menoiq	Awesome TV	
2022	Keranamu Ernie	Mat Jan	TV2	
2022	Kerusi Kecil		TV1	
2024	Hijab Pendosa	Hijab	Astro Ria	
2024	Ibu Pinjaman	Rizal	Astro Ria	

=== Television ===
Tahun	Tajuk	Peranan	Saluran TV	Catatan
1993	Sampaikan Specials	Special Host	TV3	Collab with Azwan Ali
2005-2006	Diari Anak Seni	Host	TV2	With Darling Ngasri
2006	Melodi Raya	Host guest	TV3	
2007-2008	3 Hari Dua Balam	Host	TV9	With Intan Noorsaina
2010	Simpang 3	Many	TV3	
2012	Betul ke Bohong? (Season 1)	Special Guest Himself	Astro Warna	Episode 8
2012	Betul ke Bohong? (Season 2)	Special Guest Himself	Astro Warna	Episode 13 (Final)
2013	Betul ke Bohong? (Season 3)	Special Guest Himself	Astro Warna	Episode 10
2014	Betul ke Bohong? (Season 5)	Special Guest Himself	Astro Warna	Episode 8
2014	Redah Kasi Pecah Ekstravaganza 2014	Special Guest Himself	Astro Warna	
2015	Betul ke Bohong? (Season 6)	Special Guest Himself	Astro Warna	Episode 1
2018	Di Balik Tawa (Season 1)	Special Guest Himself	Astro Warna	
2020	Bukan Calang-Calang	Host	Awesome TV	Host with Scha Alyahya
2021	Riuh Family 2		Awesome TV	
2021	Hijrahkan Laguku	Host	TV AlHijrah	Host with Faizal Ismail
2022	Sepahtu Reunion Al-Raya	Amin	Astro Warna	Episode: "Sambutan Salah Niat"
2022	Sembang Viral (Musim 2)	Special guest	TV9	Episode: "Mulut Laser"
2023	MeleTOP	Special Host	Astro Ria	
2023	Inspirasi 2024	Host	TV2	Host with Uyaina Arshad
2024	Melodi	Special host	TV3	
2024	Yak Yak Yey!	Difference	Astro Warna	
2024	I Can See Your Voice Malaysia (season 7)	Panelist	TV3	With Naim Daniel, Riena Diana & Siti Khadijah Halim
2024	Road Trip: JBS	Host	TV2	Host with Jalil Hamid & Salih Yaacob
2025	10 Malam Terakhir	Host	TV9	Host with Ustaz Tajdid Hadhari

=== Participant ===
Year	Title	Team
2011	Maharaja Lawak Mega 2011	Comel
2012	Super Spontan 2012	Beruang Comel
2013	Maharaja Lawak Mega 2013 (Kerusi Panas)	Shake
2014	Maharaja Lawak Mega 2014 (Kerusi Panas)	Shake
2014	Maharaja Lawak Mega 2014	Shake
2016	Maharaja Lawak Mega 2016	Shake
2019	Muzikal Lawak Superstar (season 1)	Libra
2019	Maharaja Lawak Mega 2019	Rojak
2021	Maharaja Lawak Mega 2021	Tobat
2023	Dapur Tempur Ra-ra	Dap Err

Tahun	Award	Category	Reception	Result
1992	Anugerah Sri Angkasa 1992	Best supporter actor	Cinta Mastura	Nominated
1998	Anugerah Skrin 1998	Best supporter actor	Pa'e	Won
2021	Maharaja Lawak Mega 2021	Kumpulan Tobat (with Ropie, Ajak who replace Shuk Sahar withdraw week 2)	Week 10 (Final)	5th place (Finalist)
2022	Anugerah Personaliti Industri & Usahawan Malaysia	Malaysia 's Choice Versatile Actor	Special Award	Won
2023	Malam Healing ERA	Special Award		Won
2023	Anugerah Bintang Popular Berita Harian ke-35	Popular Film actor		Nominated
2023	Anugerah Bintang Popular Berita Harian ke-35	Popular Comedian		Won
2023	Anugerah Bintang Popular Berita Harian ke-35	Bintang Paling Popular		Won
2024	Anugerah Bintang Popular Berita Harian ke-36	Popular Film actor		Nominated
2024	Anugerah Bintang Popular Berita Harian ke-36	Popular Comedian		Nominated
