= Fazura (album) =

Studio album by Fazura
- Released: November 2, 2017
- Recorded: 2014–2017
- Genre: Pop
- Length: 36:08
- Label: Universal Music Malaysia
- Producer: Kenny Ong (Universal Music), Fazura

Singles from Fazura
- 1. "Sayangi Dirimu" Released: December 14, 2014 (digital), April 23, 2015 (radio); 2. "Hancur Aku (featuring Estranged)" Released: December 1, 2015 (digital); 3. "Cinderella (featuring Fattah Amin)" Released: June 3, 2017 (digital); 4. "Bisa Apa" Released: June 16, 2017 (digital); 5. "Bangun" Released: June 16, 2017 (digital); 6. "Cinta Langka (featuring Samsons)" Released: December 2017 (digital)

Fazura is the debut studio album by Malaysian singer Fazura, released on 2017, by Universal Music Malaysia. Marketed exclusively online by Lazada Malaysia and distributed by Universal Music Malaysia, the album consists of 7 songs and 2 bonus tracks.

== Production ==
The album was supposed to be launched in September 2017 as it is an exclusive album project with famous composers from Malaysia and Indonesia. However, the date had to be shifted to November due to time constraints. It took about five months to complete the whole recording process as Fazura had to struggle in between appearances, shoots and other commitments. "When I’m done with work for the day, at night I head to the studio to record my album," she said during an interview.

== Release and reception ==
Fazura was released on November 2, 2017 by Universal Music Malaysia, with Kenny Ong, the managing director or Universal Music Malaysia and Fazura herself as the executive producers. The album was well-received and she managed to grab a gold award at the launch and recorded her own history when it was sold more than 5,000 units. According to Fazura, it is a success that completely unpredictable and she couldn't help crying because she have always been widely criticized by those who doesn't like her singing. "I did not expect this album to succeed in a short time. Furthermore, the current market conditions are quite challenging. I was overwhelmed and happy when the results of my efforts so far have been reversed. I'm working hard to make this album project even though I'm in a tight schedule," said Fazura during her press conference at the album launch.

The album consists of 9 tracks including 2 bonus tracks, an acoustic version of Sayangi Dirimu which was released as a single previously in 2014 and Hancur Aku, a special collaboration single with Malaysian alternative rock band Estranged, released in 2015. Sayangi Dirimu was her first solo single and released digitally on December 14, 2014 and officially on radio by April 23, 2015, as it was Fazura's initial attempt as a singer. Written by Shah Shamshiri and composed by Damian Mikhail, the song has widely received the warm welcome by her fans and it ranked 4th on the Top Charts as it launches on iTunes. Hancur Aku was written and composed by Richael Gimbang, the vocalist from alternative rock Estranged band, based on his personal experience where he was in a relationship that didn't work out at the end. Cinderella, the duet song of the original soundtrack for the drama series Hero Seorang Cinderella with her co star, Fattah Amin has reached number one spot of the local iTunes chart just after its initial release on iTunes. The song was composed by award-winning singer-songwriter Aizat Amdan, it has beaten other songs from international artistes, such as Shape Of You by Ed Sheeran and Something Just Like This by The Chainsmokers and Coldplay in just a day after it was launched on June 3, 2017. Written and composed by Ilyahida also known as Lea Ismail, her band members from The Waklu's, Bangun is a catchy version which has been modified as the new edition compared to the live version in 2015 at her mini showcase, was released together as double singles with Bisa Apa which was recorded in Jakarta in March 2017, written and composed by Indonesian composers, Tantra and Mhala Numata on June 16, 2017 and topped the two charts of iTunes Malaysia charts just after an hour they were launched. Followed by a duet single with Ariadinata from Samsons, a vocalist of a pop-rock band from Indonesia titled Cinta Langka which was released as a lyric video on YouTube on November 30, 2017 and garnered more than 100,000 views to date.

=== Sahajidah Hai-O Limited Edition ===
A limited edition of the album consists of 10 songs, including 1 bonus track as the company official theme song titled Hai-O My Choice For Life was also launched at the same time, in conjunction of her appointment as the brand's ambassador. The album was sold separately and exclusively for their registered members.

== Commercial performance ==
The album received platinum award from Universal Music Malaysia, reaching a sales value of more than 200,000 copies combining streaming and units sold globally.

== Showcase ==
On March 18, 2018, a special showcase for her fans was held at Le Meridien Kuala Lumpur and brought by ONEMUSIC, an application that allows fans to get active on social media as well as listen to streamed music. Over 400 fans attended the One Music Live Session showcase and she performed all songs from the album.

== Track listing ==
No.	Title	Writer(s)	Producer(s)	Length
1.	"Bangun"	Ilyahida	Ahmad "Kemat" Khair	3:01
2.	"Bisa Apa"	Tantra Numata, Mhala Numata	Tantra Numata	4:01
3.	"Cinderella" (featuring Fattah Amin)	Aizat Amdan, Mel Ramlan	Anas Amdan	4:55
4.	"Lalu"	Richael L Gimbang	Richael L Gimbang	4:11
5.	"Cinta Langka" (featuring Ariadinata Samsons)	Ariadinata	Irfan Aulia	3:45
6.	"Hanya Tuhan Yang Tahu"	Megat Fazzly, Shah Shamshiri	Megat Fazzly, Megat Aizzat	4:13
7.	"Only God Knows" (English version of "Hanya Tuhan Yang Tahu")	Megat Fazzly, Shanel Shanty	Megat Fazzly, Megat Aizzat	4:09

Bonus tracks
No.	Title	Writer(s)	Producer(s)	Length
8.	"Sayangi Dirimu" (Acoustic)	Damian Mikhail, Shah Shamshiri	Ahmad "Kemat" Khair	4:18
9.	"Hancur Aku" (duet with Estranged)	Richael L Gimbang	Richael L Gimbang	4:25
Total length:				36:08

== Personnel ==
Credits adapted from Fazura booklet liner notes.

=== Song credits ===
Bangun

- Arranger : Ruviyamin Ruslan
- Keys & samples : Ruviyamin Ruslan & Ahmad "Kemat" Khair
- Drums : Ruviyamin Ruslan
- Bass : Pito
- Guitars : Ahmad "Kemat" Khair
- Vocal directed by Ilyahida
- Mixed by Bijanfx @atasbybijanfx
- Mastered by Mokhtar @iseekmusic
- Vocal recorded at Dapour Rekaman
- Engineered by Efry Arwis & Kecik
- All other instruments recorded at @atasbybijanfx

Bisa Apa

- Arranger : Tantra Numata
- Guitars : Diat Nuno
- Vocal directed by : Gege Gumilar
- Strings arrangement : Ava Victoria
- Violin : RM Condro Kasmoyo, Dessy Saptany Puri, Ava Victoria
- Viola : Yacobus Widodo
- Cello : Putri Juri Batubara
- Mixed & mastered by Ari Renaldi at Aru Studio Bandung
- Vocal recorded at Backbeat Studio
- Engineered by Anggi Anggoro

Cinderella

- Arranger : Anas Amdan
- Guitars : Mel Ramlan
- Vocal directed by Aizat Amdan
- Mixed & Mastered by Anas Amdan
- Vocal Recorded at KGE Studio
- Engineered by Ahmad "Kemat" Khair

Lalu

- Arranger : Richael L Gimbang
- Music by : Richael L Gimbang
- Vocal directed by Richael L Gimbang
- Mixed & Mastered by Jedi Wong & C. L. Toh
- Vocal Recorded at 21:05 Studio
- Engineered by Jedi Wong

Cinta Langka

- Arranger : Andre Dinuth
- Guitars : Andre Dinuth
- Vocal directed by Andre Dinuth & Yessi Kritianto
- Mixed by Eko Sulistyo
- Mastered by Steve Corrao, Nashville
- Vocal recorded at Studio 168
- Engineered by Fay Ismai

Hanya Tuhan Yang Tahu

- Piano : Megat Fazzly
- Vocal directed by Aylwin Santiago
- Mixed by Mohd Tom
- Mastered by Bosh Production Studio
- Music recorded at WMS Production
- Vocal recorded at Bosh Production Studio
- Engineered by Billy Ong

Only God Knows

- Piano : Megat Fazzly
- Vocal directed by Aylwin Santiago
- Mixed by Mohd Tom
- Mastered by Bosh Production Studio
- Music recorded at WMS Production
- Vocal recorded at Bosh Production Studio
- Engineered by Billy Ong

Sayangi Dirimu

- Re-arranged by Ilyahida, Ruviyamin Ruslan & Ahmad "Kemat" Khair
- Guitars : Razi Syafie
- Vocal directed by Ilyahida
- Vocal recorded at Dapour Rekaman
- Engineered by Faiz Rosli

=== Album credits ===
- Executive Producers : Kenny Ong / Universal Music & Fazura
- Producers : Tantra Numata, Irfan Aulia (Samsons), Richael L Gimbang (Estranged), Ahmad "Kemat" Khair, Anas Amdan, Alwyn Santiago, Megat Fazzly, Megat Aizzat
- Project Manager : Aisyah MC Wong
- A&R : Nur Iman Tang
- Album Mastering : C. L. Toh (Mastering One)
- Album Design : Kenny Wong (Belantara)
- Photographer : Bustamam (White Studio)
- Wardrobe : House of Doll by Fazura
- Styling : Aizat Aidid
- Makeup : Khir Khalid
- Hairstylist : CK Liow
- Commercial (Album) : Yin Siow Paung
- New Business : Kim Lim, Shu Hann, Miselyn Lim, Kylie Koh, Carrie Yap
- Marketing : Bryan Wong, Minnie Gan, Haruka Tiffany, Tze Mien, Pheobe Heng, Nicholas Han, Clinton Chua
- Social Media (@universalmuzikmy) : Julian Head
- Digital (Production) : Steven Chen, Rachel Danker
- Media & PR : Opie, MC Aisyah (aisyah.wong@umusic.com)
- Official Management : Universal Music Sdn Bhd

== Accolades ==
- Gold Award by Universal Music Malaysia
