= Bu, Kasih Suci =

2019 Malaysian Malay-language family drama film

Bu Bu, Kasih Suci
- Directed by: Jeany Amir
- Starring: Remy Ishak; Nadiya Nisaa; Dian P. Ramlee; Iedil Putra; Nadia Brian; Rashidi Ishak; Mawar Rashid; Wan Hanafi Su
- Distributed by: MM2 Entertainment
- Release date: 11 April 2019 (Malaysia)
- Running time: 91 Minutes
- Country: Malaysia
- Language: Malay

Bu or Bu, Kasih Suci (English' Mum, Pure Love) is a 2019 Malaysian Malay-language family drama film directed by Jeany Amir in her directorial debut starring ensemble cast Remy Ishak, Nadiya Nisaa, Dian P. Ramlee, Iedil Putra, Nadia Brian, Rashidi Ishak, Mawar Rashid and Wan Hanafi Su. It follows three different mothers: a housekeeper mom, a mother with adult child, a pregnant mother, and their families whose lives changes when a car accident happens. It was released on 11 April 2019 in Malaysia.

== Synopsis ==
Three mothers from different background: Aishah (Nadiya Nisaa), a repressed housewife who feels estranged from her doctor husband Norman (Rashidi Ishak) and their teenage daughter Julie (Tia Sarah) as both are seldom at home, one busy with career, another with friends. Meanwhile, Norimah (Nadia Brian), a woman who finally gets pregnant after years of trying. She is supportive when her husband Hafiz (Remy Ishak) dream to become novelist. Then there is Diana (Mawar Rashid) who decides to postpone having children so she can focus on career, her husband Zack (Iedil Putra) agrees, although it upsets her mother-in-law Kak Mah (Dian P. Ramlee) who hopes to have grandchildren sooner. Zack also has financial problems with his own company.

When a car accident strikes, the lives of three women and their families collide, can the power of a mother's love prevail and how much they are willing to sacrifice for their children?

== Cast ==
- Remy Ishak as Hafiz
- Nadia Brian as Norimah
- Nadiya Nissa as Aishah
- Rashidi Ishak as Norman
- Dian P. Ramlee as Kak Mah
- Iedil Putra as Zack
- Mawar Rashid as Dania
- Wan Hanafi Su
- Tia Sarah as Julie
