= Revenge of the Pontianak =

2019 Singaporean romance horror film

- Directed by: Glen Goei; Gavin Yap
- Written by: Glen Goei; Gavin Yap
- Starring: Nur Fazura; Remy Ishak; Hisyam Hamid
- Production companies: Tiger Tiger Pictures; 13 Little Pictures; Primeworks Studios
- Distributed by: Golden Village Pictures; Primeworks Studiosd
- Release dates: 29 August 2019 (Singapore); 12 September 2019 (Malaysia)
- Running time: 92 minutes
- Countries: Singapore; Malaysia
- Language: Malay

Revenge of the Pontianak, or Dendam Pontianak is a 2019 Singaporean-Malaysian Malay-language romantic horror film directed by Glen Goei and Gavin Yap starring Nur Fazura and Remy Ishak. In the film, a couple and a village is being terrorised by a beautiful Pontianak, who has arrived to take revenge on a guy she loves forever.

It is released on 29 August 2019 in Singapore; 12 September 2019 in Malaysia and Brunei.

== Synopsis ==
It is 1965 in a village in Malaysia. Khalid and Siti, a couple is preparing for their wedding day with the help from the villagers. Soon after, the village suffers horrific deaths and supernatural happenings, causing fear and paranoia among the villagers. This is because, a female ghost: the beautiful Pontianak has arrived and terrorised the village. She is taking revenge on Khalid. How will their story go?

A pontianak is a female vampire ghost of a woman who had died during pregnancy or childbirth in the Southeast Asian folklore.

== Cast ==
- Nur Fazura - Mina
- Remy Ishak - Khalid
- Hisyam Hamid - Reza
- Shenty Feliziana - Siti
- Namron
- Tony Eusoff - Rais
- Nadiah M. Din
- Nadia Aqilah
- Nik Harraz Danish
- Idris Mat Diah
- Hasnah Hashim
- Haslinna Jaaman
- Wan Hanafi Su
