= Fazura =

Malaysian actress and singer

Nur Fazura
- فازورا
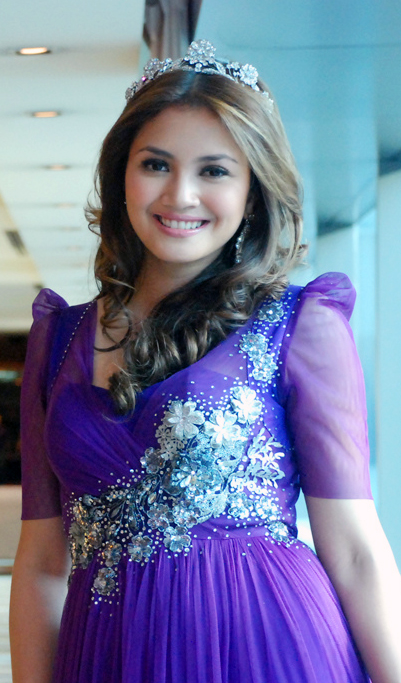
- Fazura in 2011
- Born: Nur Fazura binti Sharifuddin; September 27, 1983 (age 43); Pekan, Pahang, Malaysia
- Other name: Fazura
- Education: Hai Sing High School; Fashion Design College
- Occupations: Celebrity, Singer, model, Television host, Businessperson, VJ, lawyer
- Years active: 2004–present
- Notable work: Television: Teen's World; Tahajjud Cinta; Kisah Cinta; Facing Up To Fazura; Hero Seorang Cinderella; Film: Bicara Hati; Gol & Gincu; Pisau Cukur; Manisnya Cinta Di Cappadoccia; Langit Cinta
- Spouse: Fattah Amin (m. 2017; div. 2024)
- Children: Nur Fatima Aisya
- Parents: Sharifuddin Bin Adnan (father); Fadillah Binti Nasir (mother)
- Family: Faizah Nasir (Aunt)
- Musical career
- Genre: Pop
- Instrument: Vocal
- Years active: 2014–present
- Label: Universal Music (Malaysia)
- Website: facinguptofazura.com

Nur Fazura Sharifuddin (born 27 September 1983), better known by her stage name as Fazura, is a Malaysian actress, singer, television host, VJ, and lawyer who began her career in the Malaysian entertainment industry by hosting a television show and performing in several minor acting roles.

She was the host of a television show called Teen World. In 2004, she played the leading role in Bicara Hati, which earned her an award nomination. Later in 2005, she starred in the film Gol & Gincu. In 2010, she was featured in around 10 films, TV series and dramas, and had hosted a number of television programs.

== Early life and education ==
Fazura was born in one of the rural province at Pekan, a town in the state of Pahang in Malaysia. She is the third of four siblings and has three brothers. Her father died on 14 September 2000. She enrolled at a fashion design college and studied fashion for a while before quitting after a few months, saying, "Because my interest in the course dwindled after a while", and accepting an offer to star in Qaisy & Laila. She was discovered by film producer-director Datin Rosnani Jamil.

== Career ==
=== 2007–2008: films and TV drama ===
She hosted shows called MTV Jus and MTV Pop Inc. throughout the year. Fazura also reprised her role as Putri for the second season of the hit Gol & Gincu The Series, which aired starting on 8 July 2007. In 2008, Fazura co-starred in the film Selamat Pagi Cinta, playing Julia with Pierre Andre, Sharifah Amani and Que Haidar. Later that year, Fazura was cast in another TV series playing the title character in Ezora. Premiered on 19 May on TV3, the TV series was one of the hit drama series during the period. It premiered only for one season. Also in 2008, Fazura guest-starred on a horror TV series called Keliwon.

=== 2009–2014: TV movie and drama ===
In 2009, Fazura starred in Pisau Cukur, Fazura played a character named Intan who went on a vacation on a luxury cruise ship to cheer up her best friend Bella, played by Maya Karin. While on the ship, they encountered three Datuks, their wives and two children, one private detective and one die-hard fan of Bella's. The film was released on 5 November 2009 and became a box-office hit. It was the first time Fazura and Maya Karin had made a film together.

In 2012 Fazura opened a boutique called House Of Doll, located in Bangsar, Kuala Lumpur.

Fazura returned to the silver screen in early 2014 with the release of the horror-comedy "Kami Histeria", followed by the psychological-drama thriller "Tembus" in the middle of 2014 and "Manisnya Cinta Di Cappadocia" in December. Fazura won the Best Actress Award at the 27th Malaysia Film Festival Awards for "Manisnya Cinta Di Cappadocia". She also released her first single, "Sayangi Dirimu" and was chosen to star in E!'s first Malaysian miniseries title, "Facing Up to Fazura". The series premiered on 14 December 2014, on E! News Asia.

=== 2015–present ===
She announced three variants of body mist spray "I Love You", "Spotlight" and "Berry Beautiful" through her own brand that is named "Mystical by Fazura" under her own company label, Doll Domination, which was launched on 14 October 2015, at her boutique.

At the same time she released a new single called "Bangun", created by Lea Ismail (The Wak Lu's), one of the band members who was also involved in the mini-showcase that was being held at Hard Rock Cafe Melaka in the same month. At the time, Fazura had announced that she was planning to produce a mini-album which would consist of about seven songs. On 18 October 2015, Fazura appeared live in a mini-showcase at Hard Rock Cafe, Melaka, alongside her band, "The Wak Lu's", and performed eight songs. She also collaborated with a local alternative rock band, Estranged, in a ballad called "Hancur Aku". Their official music video currently has more than 12 million views on YouTube.

Fazura's most recent film, Langit Cinta, was released on 7 January 2016. She also plays Janet in the Indonesian film Bulan Terbelah Di Langit Amerika. She told reporters in an interview that she will be involved with two film projects in Indonesia, apart from a joint discussion with Astro Shaw for her new film.

== Filmography ==
=== Film ===
| Year | Title | Role | Notes |
|---|---|---|---|
| 2004 | Bicara Hati | Noraini | Win: 17th Malaysian Film Festival (FFM 17) – Best New Actress |
| 2005 | Senario XX | Siti | |
| 2005 | Qaisy & Laila | Laila | Nomination: 18th Malaysian Film Festival (FFM 18) – Best Actress |
| 2005 | Gol & Gincu | Putri Farhana Aliya | Nomination: 19th Malaysian Film Festival (FFM 19) – Best Actress |
| 2006 | Buli Balik | Cik Hanum Dari Langkawi | Special appearance |
| 2007 | Kayangan | Maseira | Nomination: 21st Malaysian Film Festival (FFM21) – Best Actress |
| 2008 | Selamat Pagi Cinta | Julia | |
| 2009 | Pisau Cukur | Intan Mastura | Win: Anugerah Skrin 2010 (2010 Screen Award – ASK 2010) – Best Supporting Actress |
| 2009 | Kantoi | Lydia | |
| 2010 | Lagenda Budak Setan | Katerina/Kate | Nomination: 23rd Malaysian Film Festival (FFM 23) – Best Supporting Actress |
| 2012 | Bujang Telajak | Puteri | |
| 2014 | Kami Histeria | Cik Lang | Win: Anugerah Majlis Pengkritik Filem Kuala Lumpur 2014 (2014 Kuala Lumpur Film Critics Award) – Best Supporting Actress; Nomination: 27th Malaysian Film Festival (FFM 27) – Best Supporting Actress; Nomination: Anugerah Lawak Warna (Warna Comedy Award) – Best Comedy Actress |
| 2014 | Tembus | Iza | |
| 2014 | Manisnya Cinta Di Cappadoccia | Ifti Liyana | Win: 27th Malaysian Film Festival (FFM 27) – Best Actress; Win: Anugerah Majlis Pengkritik Filem Kuala Lumpur 2015 (2015 Kuala Lumpur Film Critics Award) – Best Actress; Nomination: Anugerah Skrin 2015 (2015 Screen Award – ASK 2015) – Best Film Actress |
| 2015 | Bulan Terbelah Di Langit Amerika | Janet | Indonesian movie |
| 2016 | Langit Cinta | Khadeja | Win: Anugerah Telenovela 2017 (2017 Telenovela Award) – Most Popular Actress in Film Category; Nomination: Anugerah MeleTOP Era 2017 (2017 MeleTOP Era Award) – Bintang Filem MeleTOP; Win: Anugerah Bintang Popular Berita Harian 2016 – Best Film Actress |
| 2016 | Warkop DKI Reborn: Jangkrik Boss Part 1 | Nadia | Indonesian movie |
| 2017 | J Revolusi | Dian | Nomination: Anugerah Skrin 2017 (2017 Screen Award – ASK 2017) – Best Film Actress; Nomination: 29th Malaysian Film Festival (FFM 29) – Best Supporting Actress; Win: Anugerah MeleTOP Era 2018 (2018 MeleTOP Era Award) – Bintang Filem MeleTOP; Nomination: Anugerah Bintang Popular Berita Harian 2017 – Best Film Actress; Win: Anugerah Bintang Popular Berita Harian 2017 – Pasangan Serasi Filem |
| 2017 | Rafathar | Mila Cakra | Indonesian movie |
| 2017 | Warkop DKI Reborn: Jangkrik Boss Part 2 | Nadia | Indonesian movie |
| 2017 | Ayat-Ayat Cinta 2 | Brenda | Indonesian movie |
| 2018 | I Love When You Sing To Me | Dr. Zara | Short film |
| 2019 | Revenge of the Pontianak | Mina | |
| 2024 | Pendekar Awang: Darah Indera Gajah | Sayang | |

=== Telemovie ===
| Year | Title | Role | TV channel | Notes |
|---|---|---|---|---|
| 2006 | Rendang Untuk Mertua | Mariana/Ina | TV3 | |
| 2007 | Tikar Buruk | Ayu | Astro Prima | |
| 2008 | Sebening Azan Yang Dialun | Rabiah | TV3 | |
| 2016 | Europe, Here I Am | Firuz | Astro Citra | |
| 2017 | Wanita Terindah | Nuryn Nafeesa | Astro First Exclusive | Win : Anugerah Telenovela 2018 (2018 Telenovela Award) – Pelakon Wanita Telefilem / Filem Popular |
| 2018 | Lahzeye Bi Payan (In An Endless Instant) | Nur Zehan Nazleen | Astro First Exclusive | |

=== Television series ===
| Year | Title | Role | TV channel | Notes |
|---|---|---|---|---|
| 2005 | Inspirion | Azie | TV3 | |
| 2006–2007 | Gol & Gincu The Series | Putri Farhana Aliya | 8TV | |
| 2007 | Dalam Hati Ada Cinta | | Astro Ria | |
| 2007 | Wajah Cinta Kita | | TV3 | |
| 2007 | Datin Diaries | Nelly | TV3 | |
| 2007 | Kasih Suci | Kasih | TV3 | |
| 2008 | Ezora | Ezora | TV3 | |
| 2008 | Bicara Cinta | Mila | Astro Prima | |
| 2008 | Keliwon | | TV3 | |
| 2011 | Kitab Cinta | Mustika | TV Alhijrah | |
| 2011 | Tahajjud Cinta | Citra Maisara | TV3 | |
| 2013 | Kisah Cinta | Azalea | TV3 | |
| 2017 | Hero Seorang Cinderella | Nura Medina | Astro Ria | Win : Anugerah Telenovela 2018 (2018 Telenovela Award) – Pelakon Wanita Telenovela Popular |
| 2024 | Hero Seorang Cinderella 2 | Nura Medina | Astro Ria | |
| 2024 | Lelaki Itu | Irsa Imani | TV3 | |
| 2024 | Andartu Kosmopolitan | Dinda | Viu | |

=== Theatre performances ===
| Year | Title | Role | Date In | Location |
|---|---|---|---|---|
| 2006 | Suzana@60 | Suzana | 7 – 9 April 2006 | Istana Budaya |

=== Television ===
| Year | Title | Role | TV channel |
|---|---|---|---|
| 2002 | Teen's World | Host | TV2 |
| 2004 | MTV Pop Inc | Host | MTV |
| 2005–2007 | MTV Jus | Host | MTV |
| 2006 | Anugerah Skrin ke-8 | Host with Naz | TV3 |
| 2009 | Anak Wayang | Host with Rusdi Ramli | Astro Ria |
| 2014 | Malaysian Film Festival | Host with Fahrin Ahmad | Astro Ria |
| 2014 | Facing Up To Fazura (Season 1) | Herself | E! |
| 2015 | Facing Up To Fazura (Season 2) | Herself | E! |

=== Music video ===
| Year | Title | Performer(s) |
|---|---|---|
| 2002 | Impak Maksima | KRU |

== Discography ==
=== Studio album ===
- Fazura (2017)

=== Singles ===
| Year | Title | Composer |
|---|---|---|
| 2014 | Sayangi Dirimu | Lyrics by Shah Shamshiri; Music by Damian Mikhail |
| 2015 | Bangun | Lyrics & Music by Lea Ismail (The Wak Lu's) |
| 2015 | Hancur Aku (Feat with Estranged) | Lyrics & Music by Rich (Estranged); Special collaboration with Estranged |
| 2015 | Bulan Terbelah Di Langit Amerika | Lyrics & Music by Ammir Gita (Indonesian composer); Special duet with Ridho Rhoma |
| 2016 | Like Fireflies (Collaboration with Ning Baizura & Taufik Batisah) | Lyrics & Music by Estranged |
| 2017 | Nothing Like Pag-ibig (Feat with Jason Dy) | Lyrics & Music by Jungee Marcelo |
| 2017 | Cinderella (Feat with Fattah Amin) | Music by Aizat Amdan, Mel Ramlan; Lyrics by Anas Amdan |
| 2017 | Bisa Apa | Music by Mhala Numata; Lyrics by Tantra Numata |
| 2017 | Cinta Langka (Feat with Ariadinata (Samsons) | Music by Ariadinata (Samsons); Lyrics by Ariadinata (Samsons) |
| 2018 | The Good Is Back (Feat with Anggun) | Music by Jeremy Poligné, Tiborg; Lyrics by Anggun, Manon Romiti, Jeremy Poligné |
| 2019 | Can't Forget Me | Co-written by herself and Los Angeles-based duo Willy Beaman and Cameron Forbes. |
| 2024 | Bertahan Demi Cinta (Feat Fattah Amin) | |
| 2025 | Raya Pum Pang (Feat Syasya) | |

== Personal life ==
On 23 November 2017, it was confirmed that she and actor Fattah Amin got engaged on 13 November 2017. The pair had met while shooting for the drama Hero Seorang Cinderella which aired on Slot MegaDrama Astro Ria. They got married in a private ceremony where only family members and close friends were invited on 27 November 2017, at Ritz Carlton hotel in Kuala Lumpur.

Fazura filed for divorce on 13 September 2024 after seven years of marriage.

== Awards and nominations ==
| Year | Award | Category | Nominated work | Result |
|---|---|---|---|---|
| 2004 | 17th Malaysian Film Festival | Most Promising Actress | Bicara Hati | Won |
| 2005 | 18th Malaysian Film Festival | Best Actress | Qaisy & Laila | Nominated |
| 2006 | 19th Malaysian Film Festival | Best Actress | Gol & Gincu | Nominated |
| 2008 | 21st Malaysian Film Festival | Best Actress | Kayangan | Nominated |
| 2009 | Screen Award | Best Supporting Actress in Film | Pisau Cukur | Won |
| 2010 | 23rd Malaysian Film Festival | Best Supporting Actress | Lagenda Budak Setan | Nominated |
| 2010 | Shout! Award | Hot Chick Award | —N/a | Nominated |
| 2011 | Anugerah Stail EH! | Selebriti Wanita Paling Bergaya | —N/a | Won |
| 2011 | Anugerah Pilihan Pembaca Media Hiburan | Artis Wanita Seksi | —N/a | Won |
| 2011 | Anugerah Pilihan Pembaca Media Hiburan | Artis Stailo | —N/a | Nominated |
| 2014 | KL Film Critics Award | Best Supporting Actress | Kami Histeria | Won |
| 2014 | Warna Comedy Awards | Best Comedy Actress | Kami Histeria | Nominated |
| 2014 | Anugerah Penghargaan H-Live | Woman of the Year | —N/a | Won |
| 2014 | Anugerah MeleTOP Era | Fesyen MeleTOP | —N/a | Nominated |
| 2014 | Anugerah Stail EH! | Selebriti Wanita Paling Bergaya | —N/a | Won |
| 2015 | KL Film Critics Award | Best Actress | Manisnya Cinta Di Cappadoccia | Won |
| 2015 | 27th Malaysian Film Festival | Best Supporting Actress | Kami Histeria | Nominated |
| 2015 | 27th Malaysian Film Festival | Best Actress | Manisnya Cinta Di Cappadoccia | Won |
| 2015 | Warna Comedy Awards | Best Comedy Actress | Manisnya Cinta Di Cappadoccia | Nominated |
| 2015 | Screen Award | Best Actress | Manisnya Cinta Di Cappadoccia | Nominated |
| 2015 | Anugerah MeleTOP Era 2015 | Fesyen MeleTOP | —N/a | Won |
| 2016 | Entrepreneur Insight 2016 | 100 Most Influential Young Entrepreneurs 2016 (100MIYE) | —N/a | Won |
| 2016 | Anugerah Stail EH! | Selebriti Paling Fotogenik | —N/a | Won |
| 2016 | Anugerah Stail EH! | Selebriti Wanita Paling Bergaya | —N/a | Nominated |
| 2016 | Anugerah Stail EH! | Selebriti Pencapaian Terbaik | —N/a | Nominated |
| 2016 | Anugerah Melodi | Personaliti Fesyen Melodi | —N/a | Nominated |
| 2017 | Anugerah MeleTOP Era 2016 | Fesyen MeleTOP | —N/a | Nominated |
| 2017 | Anugerah MeleTOP Era 2016 | Bintang Filem MeleTOP | Langit Cinta | Nominated |
| 2017 | Anugerah Bintang Popular Berita Harian 2016 | Pelakon Filem Wanita Popular | Langit Cinta | Won |
| 2017 | Anugerah Telenovela 2017 | Pelakon Wanita Popular (Kategori Filem Pilihan Juri) | Langit Cinta | Won |
| 2018 | Anugerah MeleTOP Era 2017 | Fesyen MeleTOP | —N/a | Nominated |
| 2018 | Anugerah MeleTOP Era 2017 | Bintang Filem MeleTOP | J Revolusi | Won |
| 2018 | Anugerah Telenovela 2018 | Pelakon Wanita Telenovela Popular | Hero Seorang Cinderella | Won |
| 2018 | Anugerah Telenovela 2018 | Pelakon Wanita Telefilem / Filem Popular | Wanita Terindah | Won |
| 2018 | Anugerah Bintang Popular Berita Harian 2017 | Penyanyi Wanita Popular | —N/a | Nominated |
| 2018 | Anugerah Bintang Popular Berita Harian 2017 | Pelakon TV Wanita Popular | Hero Seorang Cinderella | Won |
| 2018 | Anugerah Bintang Popular Berita Harian 2017 | Pelakon Filem Wanita Popular | J Revolusi | Nominated |
| 2018 | Anugerah Bintang Popular Berita Harian 2017 | Pasangan Serasi Drama – with Fattah Amin (Kategori Online) | Hero Seorang Cinderella | Won |
| 2018 | Anugerah Bintang Popular Berita Harian 2017 | Pasangan Serasi Filem – with Zul Ariffin (Kategori Online) | J Revolusi | Won |
