= Tahajjud Cinta (TV series) =

2011 Malaysian television series

- Genre: Legal drama Romance; Religion; Conflict
- Written by: Mazelan Manan
- Directed by: Eirma Fatima
- Starring: Nur Fazura; Fouziah Gous; Eman Manan; Remy Ishak
- Opening theme: Merpati Putih - Chrisye, Zamani and Astrid
- Ending theme: Merpati Putih - Chrisye, Zamani and Astrid
- Country of origin: Malaysia
- Original language: Malay
- No. of seasons: 1
- No. of episodes: 13

Production
- Executive producers: Fadhilah Mohd Shariff; Nabila Hizam
- Producer: Eirma Fatima
- Production locations: Kuala Lumpur, Malaysia
- Editors: Damien Wu Kong Chuen; Aliff JJ Abd Majid
- Running time: 38-42 minutes
- Production company: Rumah Karya Citra

Original release
- Network: TV3
- Release: 8 July – 14 October 2011

Tahajjud Cinta (English: Overnight Of Love) is a 2011 Malaysian television series starring Nur Fazura, Fouziah Gous, Eman Manan and Remy Ishak. It aired on TV3 from July 8, 2011 to October r 14, 2011 every Friday at 21:00 (MST). It is also streaming in platform YouTube TV3 Malaysia. This drama tells us about religious devotion and love to be able to motivate a person to do something much less noble to do something extraordinary.

== Synopsis ==
Tahajjud Cinta story about the sacrifice of two women, Citra Maisara (Nur Fazura) and Seri (Fouziah Gous) in the fight for truth, rights and reputation of women. Derived from two different backgrounds, Citra is the daughter of a married couple is the leader of a big company. For 5 years studying abroad, Citra's parents never knew that their daughter whom they sent to London to pursue Civil, had secretly migrated to Jordan to explore the field of Shari'a law. In it, Citra reunited with her close friends Seri, who shared the same ambitions.

Their lives began being bombarded with many trials and great pressure after returning to the bosom of their families in Malaysia. Back at the Malaysia, Citra parents are very surprised with the changes and approvals obtained. So frustrated with the actions, Citra's parents will not allow Citra the resolve to pursue her dream as a Syariah lawyer.

But everything changes when her sister, Emelda (Tiz Zaqyah) suffer as a result of violence by her husband (Heryanto Hassan). Seeing the seriousness of the oppression of Emelda defend her husband, Citra parents finally endorsing the struggle.

In contrast, the fate of Seri, where she had to forget her ambitions as a Syariah lawyer. As the request of her father (Ahmad Tarmimi Siregar), Seri was forced to marry Ustaz Shauki (Eman Manan) that has been financing Seri overseas studies. Unfortunately, Seri victims of flogging Ustaz Shauki that already had three wives (Erma Fatima), (Melissa Saila) and (Dira Abu Zahar). Seri is forced to forget her love for Sollahudin (Remy Ishak), son of Ustaz Shauki.

This situation also cut Ustaz Shauki three wives feelings very jealous of the Seri. Although tormented, for family firm and pleased to continue to live, Seri throw her ambition to succeed as a Syariah lawyer. However, the situation start change when the emergence of Armani (Neelofa).

== Cast ==
=== Main character ===
- Nur Fazura as Citra Maisara
- Fouziah Gous as Seri
- Eman Manan as Ustaz Sauki
- Remy Ishak as Solahudin

=== Extended cast ===
- Tiz Zaqyah as Emelda
- Aaron Aziz as Iskandar
- Shahz Jaszle as Azihan
- Fazreen Rafi as Wahdi
- Jins Shamsuddin as Tan Sri
- Norish Karman as Nora
- Neelofa as Suraya
- Ahmad Tamimi Siregar as Pak Azim
- Eirma Fatima as Hamani
- Dira Abu Zahar as Umairah
- Ziela Jalil as Qadirah
- Azizah Mahzan as Puan Sri
- Heryanto Hassan as Tengku Irfan
- Fadhilah Mansor as Habibah
- Melissa Saila as Syarifah
- Anne Abdullah as Zulaika
- Zack Taipan as Karim
- Chomatt Samad as Yusof
- Amar as Radzwill
- Zainul Ariffin as Edinson Cavani
- Muhammad Bukhori as Frank Lampard

== Awards and nominations ==
Year	Award	Category	Nominated work	Result
2011	Profima Awards	Best Director	Erma Fatima	Won
2011	Profima Awards	Best Art Director	Rabiati Adawiyah Ismail	Won
2011	Profima Awards	Best Camera Operator	Asrar Lukmanal Hakim	Won
2011	Profima Awards	Best Drama Series	Tahajjud Cinta	Won
