= Betul ke bohong? =

- Presented by: AC Mizal (2012–2015); Johan (2015–2017); Ozlynn Waty (2017)
- Country of origin: Malaysia
- Original language: Malay
- No. of seasons: 8
- No. of episodes: 104

Production
- Running time: 30 minutes
- Production company: Shoot Motion Sdn. Bhd. Vision Works Sdn. Bhd.

Original release
- Network: Astro Warna; Astro Mustika HD
- Release: May 30, 2012 – April 3, 2017

Betul ke Bohong? (colloquial Malay for Truth or Lie?) is a Malaysian game show-formatted comedy television program provided in the Astro satellite television network which is broadcast every Monday at 10pm on Astro Warna and Astro Mustika HD.

== Format ==
Betul Ke Bohong is a celebrity panel show based on reality and the story may be true or not. In season one until three, Jep and Shuib from Sepahtu will competed against each other. One team consists of a leader and two guests participants throughout the season. In season four and five, Jep and Shuib from Sepahtu were replaced by Ajak and Sharol from Shiro. In season six and seven, Ajak and Sharol from Shiro were replaced by Haniff and Ray from JoHaRa Pagi Era. Both seasons are hosted by Johan, replacing AC Mizal after five seasons.

In the first round, participants must decide whether a statement made by one of their opponents is true or false. If the answer is correct, the leader of the opponent team will be subjected to an electric shock. On the other hand, if the answer is false, the leader of participant's team will be subjected to an electric shock. In second round, the format is same as first round, but the punishment is given to participating members instead of the leader of the group. In the third (and final) round, both groups must decide whether a statement made by various artists. If the group answer is correct, all members of the opponent's team will be subject to an electric shock (this is also happen if both teams give a correct answers). On the other hand, if the group answer is wrong, all members of the group will be subject to an electric shock (this is also happen if both teams give a wrong answers). They will battle to get top marks for their respective teams. After a final round, the winner team decided by the highest score in all three rounds.

In season eight (also known as Betul ke Bohong Sayang), the game format changed to a match between three married couples instead of 2 teams consisting of a leader and 2 guest participants.

== Seasons ==
=== Season One ===
EP	EP (season)	Guest Star			
EP	EP (season)	Jepp's Group Artis Lawak Lelaki Paling Popular Anugerah Lawak Warna Champion Super Spontan 2013		Shuib's Group Champion Redah Kasi Pecah Extravaganza	
1	1	Ropie Hiro & Comey Maharaja Lawak Mega 2011 & 2013	Tauke Jambu Raja Lawak 1	A.R Badul	Angah Raja Lawak 1
2	2	Kefli AF3	Kenchana Dewi	Caca Raja Lawak 4	Azmir Cuit Raja Lawak 6
3	3	Ezlynn	Keroz Nazri	Yassin	Douglas Lim
4	4	Ajak Shiro Raja Lawak 6	Saiful Apek	Iffa Raziah	Imuda
5	5	Caca Raja Lawak 4	A.R Badul	Kenchana Dewi	Mamak
6	6	Angelina	Munir	Sharol Shiro Raja Lawak 6	Saiful Apek
7	7	Iffa Raziah	Shamsul Ghau-Ghau Raja Lawak 3	Kefli AF3	Imuda
8	8	Douglas Lim	Bell Ngasri	Black	Man Raja Lawak 5
9	9	Aman	Rahim R2 Raja Lawak 5	Ropie Hiro & Comey Maharaja Lawak Mega 2011 & 2013	Shamsul Ghau-Ghau Raja Lawak 3
10	10	Yassin 3G Maharaja Lawak Mega 2011	Black	A.R Badul	Munir
11	Suku Akhir	Angelina	Sathiya	Diandra Arjunaidi	Yus Jambu Raja Lawak 1
12	Separuh Akhir	Angah Raja Lawak 1	Shazli Cuit	Juzztin	Azmir Cuit
13	Episod Akhir	Ropie Hiro & Comey Maharaja Lawak Mega 2011 & 2013	Shahz Jaszle	Keroz Nazri	Rahim R2 Raja Lawak 5

=== Season Two ===
EP	EP (season)	Guest Star			
EP	EP (season)	Jepp's Group		Shuib's Group	
14	1	Caca Raja Lawak	Azmir	Mamak	Tauke
15	2	Ajak Shiro	Saiful Apek	Atu Zero	Achong
16	3	Haniff	Ida Moin	Man Raja Lawak 5	Jihan Raja Lawak 3
17	4	Shawal AF5	Azrul Cham	Munir	Hazama
18	5	Kefli AF3	Sharol Shiro	Kenchana Dewi	Mamak
19	6	Pak Chu	Shuk Balas	Mie	Anu
20	7	Angeline	Yassin	A.R Badul	Joey
21	8	Mamak	Aepul	Talam	Rahim R2
22	9	Tauke	Sobri	Sharifah Shahora	Sharifah Sakinah
23	10	Saiful Apek	Achong	Black	Sharol Shiro
24	11	Shamsul Ghau-Ghau	Munir	Pak Chu	Fendi Balas
25	12	Anne Ngasri	Kenchana Dewi	Man Raja Lawak	Noor Khiriah
26	13	Angah Raja Lawak	Illya	Bell Ngasri	Yassin

=== Season Three ===
EP	EP (season)	Guest Star			
EP	EP (season)	Jepp's Group		Shuib's Group	
27	1	Noni AF5	AR Badul	Angah Raja Lawak	Angeline Tan
28	2	Shazli	Tauke	Jegan	Mamat
29	3	Munir	Atu Zero	Hazama	Farouk Hussein
30	4	Noorkhiriah	Talam	Haniff	Ida Moin
31	5	Rizman Khuzaimi	Man Belon	Yassin	Zahid AF2
32	6	Ropie	Black	Ajak Shiro	Kefli AF3
33	7	Jihan Raja Lawak	Rahim R2	Anne Ngasri	Kenchana Dewi
33	8	Sobri	Amir Raja Lawak	Shamsul Ghau-Ghau	Tauke
34	9	Fendi Balas	Mie	Shuk Balas	Munir
