= Pulang (film) =

2018 film by Kabir Bhatia

- Release poster
- Directed by: Kabir Bhatia
- Screenplay by: Mira Mustaffa; Ahmad Izham Omar
- Story by: Ahmad Izham Omar; Omar Othman
- Produced by: Irene Mariena Mohamad
- Starring: Remy Ishak; Puteri Aishah; Alvin Wong; Azrel Ismail; Erwin Dawson; Juliana Evans
- Cinematography: Zambree Haras
- Edited by: Kabir Bhatia; Naeim Ghalili
- Music by: Aubrey Suwito
- Production companies: Primeworks Studios; Grand Brilliance
- Distributed by: Primeworks Distribution; Netflix
- Release date: July 26, 2018
- Running time: 120 minutes
- Country: Malaysia
- Languages: Malay; English
- Budget: MYR 6 million
- Box office: MYR 2.3 million

Pulang (English: Come Back) is a 2018 Malaysian Malay-language adventure drama film directed by Kabir Bhatia based on the screenplay by Mira Mustaffa and Ahmad Izham Omar and story by izham and his father, Omar Othman from the true story of Omar.

== Plot ==
Around the 1940s when Japan conquered Malaya, Othman, a sailor who wanted to change the fate and life of his family by following an adventure sailing around the world. Before sailing, he had promised that he would return with riches for his wife Che Thom and their son, Omar. With patience, his wife accepted his departure and faithfully waited for her husband's return for 61 years.

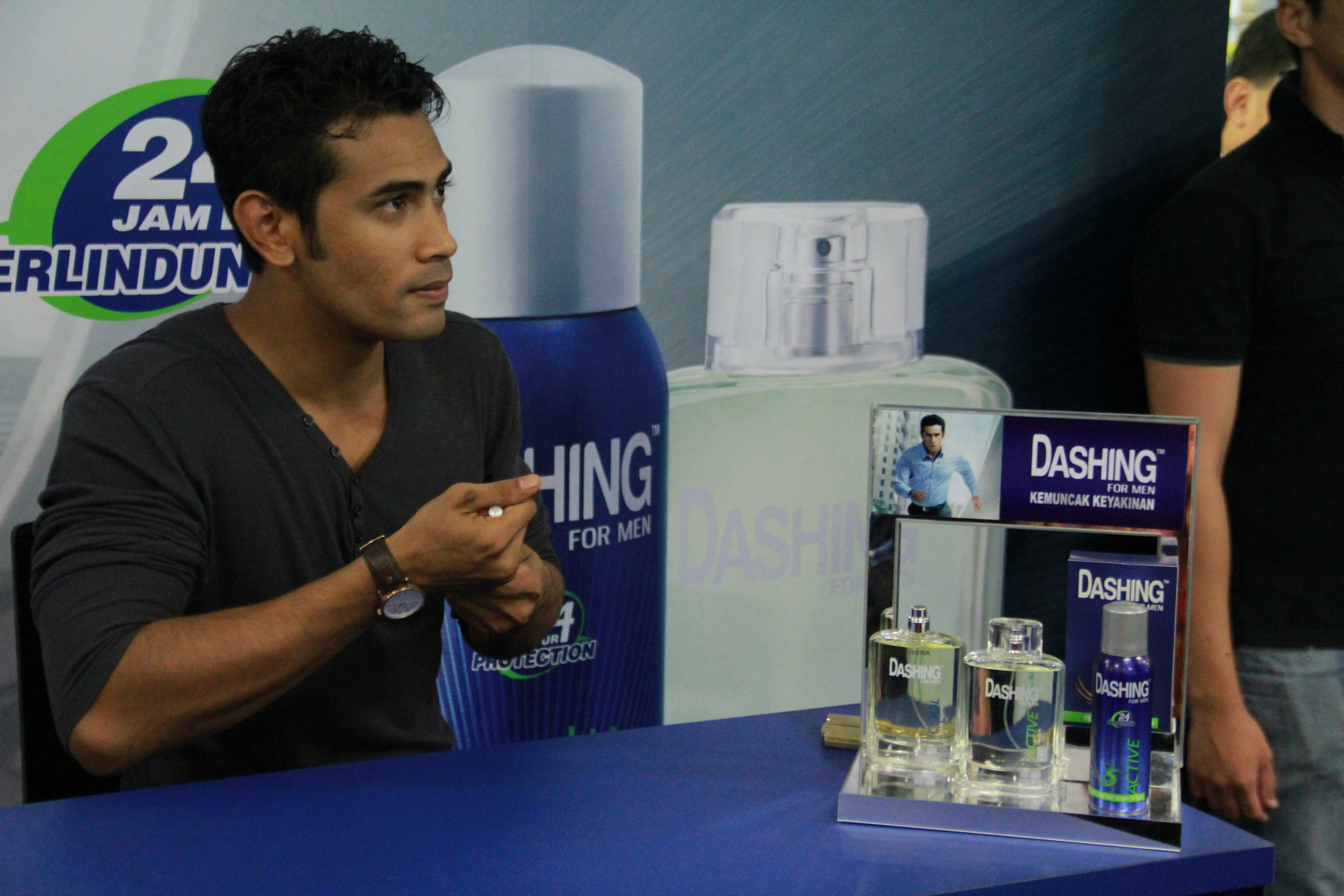
Remy Ishak (pictured in 2011) played as Othman, the main role of the film

== Cast ==
- Remy Ishak as Othman
- Puteri Aishah as Thom
- Alvin Wong as Lum
- Azrel Ismail as Omar
- Erwin Dawson as Ahmad
- Juliana Evans as Alia
- Jalaluddin Hassan as Omar (50s)
- Rahim Razali as Jamil (90s)
- Sherry Al Jeffry as Thom (70s)
- Aida Khalida as Jaybah
- Idan Aedan as Omar 11 years
- Akmal Ahmad as Karim
- Nur Akhtar Mohamad Amin as Salmah
- Iman Haidar as Omar 6 years
- Syazuwan Hassan as Cikgu Hassan

== Production ==
=== Production ===
Pulang is based on a true story of a sailor in the 1940s. It was directed by Kabir Bhatia, an Indian-born film director known for films such as Cinta (2006), Stamp (2009) and Nur Kasih The Movie (2011). The script of the film was written by Kabir's wife, Mira Mustaffa together with Ahmad Izham Omar. The cost of making this film is estimated to be RM 6 million, while the cost of the computer generated images is reported to be RM2 million with the help of Basecamp VFX.

The original idea of this film was given by the Chief Executive Officer of Media Prima Television Network Berhad, Datuk Ahmad Izham Omar which is based on a real event containing dramatic elements and also features a story that is certainly quite tragic in a different era, it also features the era of conquest Japan during the Second World War.

=== Casting ===
All the actors involved went through an audition session conducted by Kabir to choose the right actors to play their respective roles. Azrel Ismail, who is famous for his roles in dramas and telefilms, plays the role of Omar; Azrel admitted that his dream of acting with Remy Ishak came true in this film and was excited to be able to work under Kabir's direction. Former Dewi Remaja 2014/15 alumni, Puteri Aishah played the role of Che Thom; Pulang is his acting debut. Remy who previously acted in several films directed by Kabir, played the role of Othman; he initially thought the script was good and still could not imagine how computer generated image (CGI) techniques would be used. For this film, he camped for two weeks in Terengganu.
