= Sangkar =

2019 Malaysian martial arts film

- Directed by: Kabir Bhatia
- Written by: Mira Mustaffa
- Starring: Zul Ariffin; Remy Ishak; Mira Filzah
- Cinematography: Nurhanisham Muhammad
- Edited by: Kabir Bhatia
- Music by: Luka Kuncevic
- Distributed by: Primeworks Studios; Astro Shaw; Infinitus Gold; MM2 Entertainment
- Release dates: 29 August 2019 (Malaysia, Singapore, Brunei)
- Running time: 112 minutes
- Country: Malaysia
- Language: Malay
- Budget: MYR 2.80 million
- Box office: MYR 12 million

Sangkar (English: Cage) is a 2019 Malaysian Malay-language martial arts action drama film directed by Kabir Bhatia starring Zul Ariffin, Remy Ishak and Mira Filzah. This film depicts about the rivalry and redemption between two local mixed martial arts (MMA) fighters, as they go from enemies to friends while fighting for glory and family. This film is the first Malaysian MMA film. This was the reunion project of Ariffin and Ishak, nine years after Evolusi KL Drift 2 (2010).

It was released on 29 August 2019 in Malaysia, Singapore and Brunei.

== Synopsis ==
The film presents Adam as an MMA fighter, raised by his stepfather Hassan after his mother Hajar died while his father was in prison. Adam was supposed to fight with James McSweeney, but McSweeney's arm was broken due to an accident. He was replaced by Johan. Azalea, (Johan’s sister) who works as the nurse, forces Reza (Johan’s little brother) to go home.

During the tournament, Adam pokes Johan’s eye. Adam wins the tournament playing dirty tactics. Farid, who is the bookie debt collector, is not satisfied that Adam won. Adam tells Farid that he will pay him. Johan was supposed to be home after praying, but a massive fight with police involved Adam and Johan. Soon after, Johan is seriously injured by Adam, while Jai and his friends are arrested by police.

Adam feels guilty that Johan was sent to the hospital. He rushes to see him, but is attacked by Bob (a friend of Johan) and Lea tells Bob to calm him down. She tells Adam not to see Johan and forces him to leave. After that, Adam works as a construction worker. He causes an incident. His boss Hassan tells Adam that he is going to cut his salary and humiliate his mother. Adam quits.

Adam is followed by Reza to the mosque. Adam’s house gets trashed. He sees a cheque on his mother's picture with a note saying, ‘pay or die’. Adam wants Lea to keep the money, but she refuses. Adam goes to sees Johan, who calls the nurse and tells them to get Adam to leave. Later on, Adam was forced to throw away the alcohol and learns about repenting with his late mother.

The next morning, Adam visits Johan again. Johan tells him he is giving the money to his family. Adam is chased by Farid’s henchmen. He fights them but is knocked out and falls off the roof. Adam gives RM1000 to Farid and RM1000 to him. He wants to fight in the underground with prizes RM2000.

Adam is called by Reza that Johan had fallen by his bed. Adam tries to carry Johan, but Johan tells him not to. He forces Reza to carry him instead. Lea comes home angry at Reza about Adam who came to help. Johan tells Lea that Adam is going to help him. The next morning, Adam, Lee and Hafiz steal a wheelchair and bed at the retirement house. They send the wheelchair and a bed to Johan’s house. Johan doesn’t thank Adam. Adam takes care of Johan helping him eat, drink, and give him adult diapers.

Later than evening, Adam loses a fight in the underground. Hafiz gives him money. Adam, Johan, Lea, Bob and Reza go to the water park. Adam starts to feel love for Lea, but she is not ready. He takes another fight and wins, but McSweeney tells him that he will join him the fight and not be a coward.

Lea heals Adam after a fight and tells him she doesn't like people who fight. Adam and Johan enjoy the view at the park. After Johan realizes about the night fight, he forgives Adam. Meanwhile, Jai is released from prison and explains to Lea about the night fight. Lea knows that Johan and Adam were fighting. Adam explains to Lea that he is the one who injured Johan. Outraged, Lea angrily slaps Adam, forcing him to leave. Johan tells Lea to give Adam a chance, but she refuses. Adam doesn't forgive himself. Lea feels deeply embarrassed.

After that, Adam is told by Hafiz that Mcsweeney is going to fight with Adam. He rushes to the hospital to see Johan. Adam is not yet training to fight Mcsweeney. Johan trains Adam to fighting with Mcsweeney. Johan stops fighting and becomes as Adam's trainer.

At the final tournament, Adam finally fights Mcsweeney. As Mcsweeney beats on Adam, but he sees his late mother who tells him to try again. In the final round, Adam finally defeats Mcsweeney.

== Cast ==
- Zul Ariffin as Adam Abdullah
- Mira Filzah as Liya
- Remy Ishak as Johan Kamaruddin
- Nik Adam Mika as Reza
- Ray (Era FM) as Bob
- Andy Teh as Lee
- Niezam Zaidi as Jai
- Aman Graseka as Hassan
- James McSweeney as MMA Athlete
- Fadlan Hazim
- Carliff Carleel
- Emelda Rosmila
- Zarul Albakri

== Production ==
The film cost around RM 2.8 million. Filming took place in Kuala Lumpur, Petaling Jaya and Banting, Selangor from 7 May to 11 June 2018. MMA fighter Saiful Reza choreographed the scenes and trained the actors. The film also features appearances by established MMA fighter such as local fighters Saiful Merican, Peter Davis, Jihin Radzuan, Rashid Salleh, Andy Teh; and international fighters James "Sledgehammer" McSweeney and Davron Kuronboev.
