= Bulan Terbelah di Langit Amerika 2 =

- Directed by: Rizal Mantovani
- Produced by: Ody Mulya Hidayat
- Starring: Acha Septriasa; Abimana Aryasatya; Nino Fernandez; Rianti Cartwright; Hannah Al-Rashid; Ira Wibowo; Boy William; Yeslin Wang
- Edited by: Ryan Purwoko
- Music by: Joseph S. Djafar
- Production companies: Falcon Pictures; Max Pictures
- Distributed by: Falcon Pictures; Max Pictures
- Release date: 8 December 2016 (Indonesia)
- Running time: 118 minutes
- Country: Indonesia
- Languages: Bahasa Indonesia; English; Mandarin Chinese

Bulan Terbelah di Langit Amerika 2 (English: Moon Split on America's Sky 2 or Split Moon in the American Sky 2) is an Indonesian drama film, directed by Rizal Mantovani. The film is the fourth sequel to 99 Cahaya di Langit Eropa. The story follows the adventures of Hanum and Rangga from Europe to the United States. It stars Acha Septriasa, Abimana Aryasatya, Nino Fernandez, Rianti Cartwright, and Boy William.

Bulan Terbelah di Langit Amerika 2 was mainly filmed in San Francisco as well as Singkawang.

== Plot ==
A husband and wife, Hanum and Rangga, are given tasks to find alleged treasures left by Chinese Muslim sailors in San Francisco.

== Cast ==
- Abimana Aryasatya as Rangga
- Acha Septriasa as Hanum
- Nino Fernandez as Stefan
- Rianti Cartwright as Azima Hussein/Julia Collins
- Hannah Al-Rashid as Jasmine
- Boy William as Peter Cheng
- Hailey Franco as Sarah Collins
- Ira Wibowo as Hyacinth
- Yeslin Wang as Chinese Muslim of Hui ethnicity
- Kenny Adianto Putra
- Eko Susilo as People's Liberation Army soldier
- Rudianto Fransiskus as a People's Liberation Army soldier
- Novi Sari as audience of lion dance attraction (background actress)
- Astro Li as audience of lion dance attraction (background actor)
- Thomas Johansen as audience of lion dance attraction (background actor)

== Soundtrack ==
Ost. Bulan Terbelah di Langit Amerika contains two songs: "Bulan Terbelah Dilangit Amerika" by Ridho Rhoma and Nur Fazura, and "Jangan Salahkan Cinta" by Andini and English band Arkarna.

== See also ==
- Bulan Terbelah di Langit Amerika, the previous sequel film
