= Anzalna Nasir =

Malaysian actress

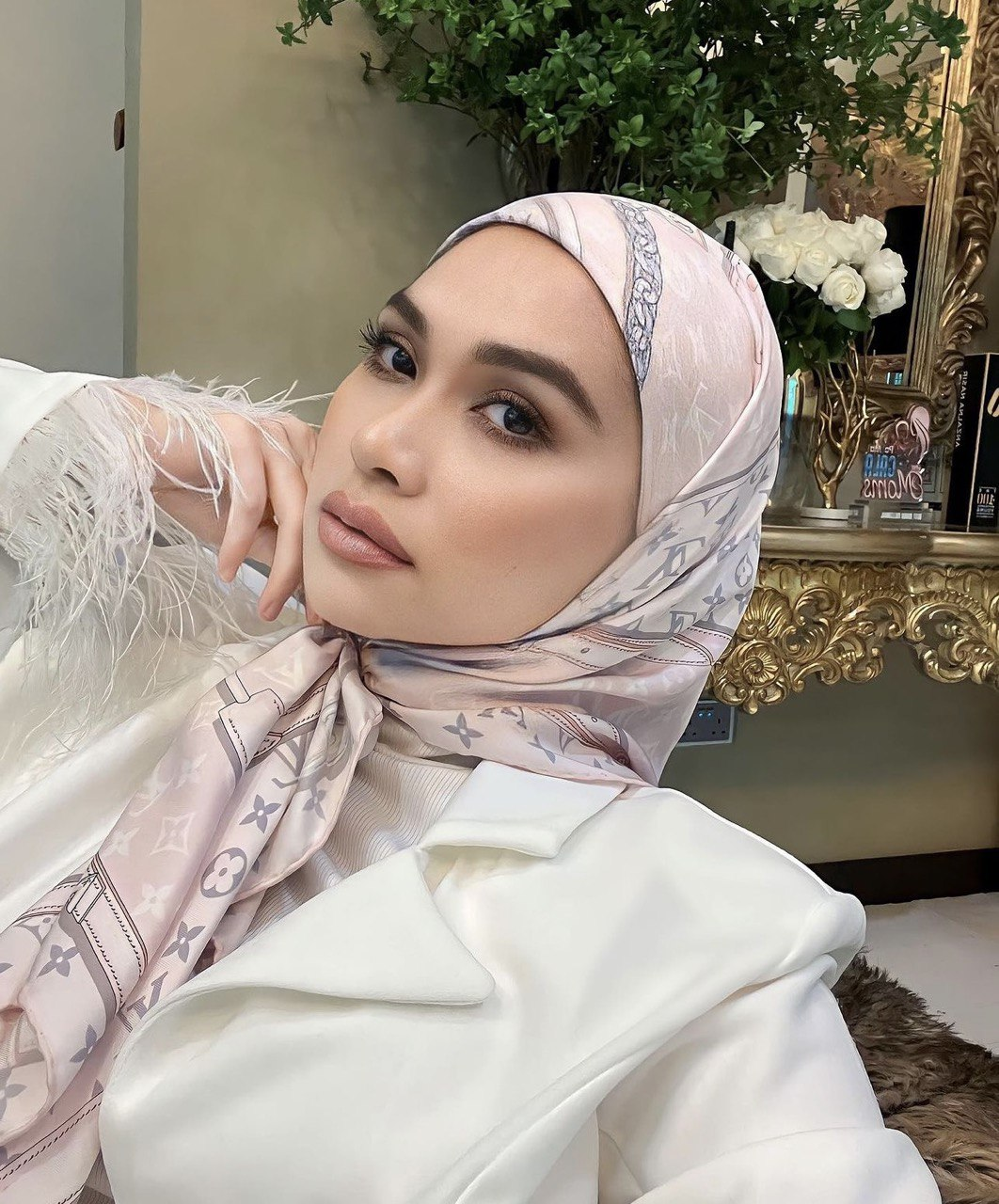
- Born: Nur Anzalna Md Nasir; 9 January 1988 (age 38); Tasek Gelugor, Penang, Malaysia
- Occupations: Actress, Model
- Years active: 2011–present
- Spouse: Hanif Zaki (m. 2016)
- Relatives: Mia Nasir (sister); Affifah Nasir (sister)

Nur Anzalna Md Nasir (born 9 January 1988) is a Malaysian actress and commercial model.

== Early life ==
Anzalna is the second of five siblings and was born at Tasek Gelugor, Pulau Pinang on 9 January 1988. Anzalna grew up in many places. She went to primary school in Montreal, Quebec, Canada from 1996 to 1998 while her father completed his master's degree at McGill University, Canada. She first attended Coronation Elementary School, followed by Sinclair Laird Elementary School and lastly Bancroft Elementary School. Upon her father's completion of his studies, the family moved back to Malaysia and she continued her primary education in Muar and Melaka. She pursued her secondary education at SMK Munshi Abdullah and SMK Khir Johari.

Anzalna left Malaysia in 2004 to follow her father undertaking his doctorate degree at the University of Tasmania, Australia. In Tasmania, she attended Brooks High School, Launceston before moving on to Launceston College, Tasmania to further her studies.

== Filmography ==
=== Television series ===
Year	Title	Role	TV Network
2011	Suria di Cordoba		Astro Prima
2011	Ramadhan Terakhir	Rossa	TV3
2012	Gemersik Kalbu	Tasha	TV3
2012	Mahabbah	Katrina	TV3
2012	24 Hari Sebelum Jatuh Cinta		TV1
2012	Sirrun	Surina	TV9
2012	Indera Joned	Dr. Sara	TV3
2013	Maskara	Hani	TV1
2013	Love You Mr. Arrogant	Farizah	TV3
2013	Bangkitnya Seorang Perempuan	Balqish	TV3
2013	Tentang Hati		TV2
2013	Buletin Cinta		TV3
2013	Orang Gaji IQ	Shahira/Erni Wibowo	TV2
2014	Aku Isterinya	Mya Arlissa	TV3
2014	Kalau Itu Jodoh Kita		TV Alhijrah
2014	Jauh Dari Cinta	Nysa Sakinah	Astro Prima
2015	Memori Cinta Suraya	Suraya	Astro Prima
2017	Arluna	Nia Arluna	Astro Prima
2017	Dendam Aurora	Putri Adrina	Astro Prima
2018	Mamu Mami Gosip		RTM

=== Television movie ===
Year	Title	Role	TV Network
2011	Ajaibnya Cinta	Musliha	TV3
2012	Cik Paris Diva Kampung		Astro Prima
2012	Aku Janda Belum Kaya		Astro Prima
2012	2 Dalam 1	Mia	TV3
2013	Salahkah Aku	Allysa	TV3
2013	Destinasi Cinta Sara	Liza	Astro Ria
2013	Cinta Dari Syurga	Nurul Hannan	TV3
2014	Sayang Harissa	Harissa	TV1
2014	Klon Ustaz		TV9
2015	Member Superstar Balik Raya		Astro Ria
2016	Jauh		Astro Ria
2018	Vlog Laura	Munirah	ntv7
2018	Renyai Takbir Raya		Astro Ria

=== Film ===
Year	Title	Role	Director	Production	Notes
2012	Sepah The Movie	Ayu Sofea	MP Roslin Md Shariff	PTV Film Production Sdn Bhd	
2012	Kahwin 5	Farra	Nizam Zakaria	KRU Production	
2012	Tyickoouns	Ramona	Izan Hailmey Mokhtar		

=== Television show ===
Year	Program	Role	TV Network
2012 and 2013	Karoot Komedia	Guest Artist	Astro Mustika HD
2012 and 2013	Kilauan Emas	Guest Artist	Astro Prima
