= Shahz Jaszle =

Malaysian actor and model (born 1988)

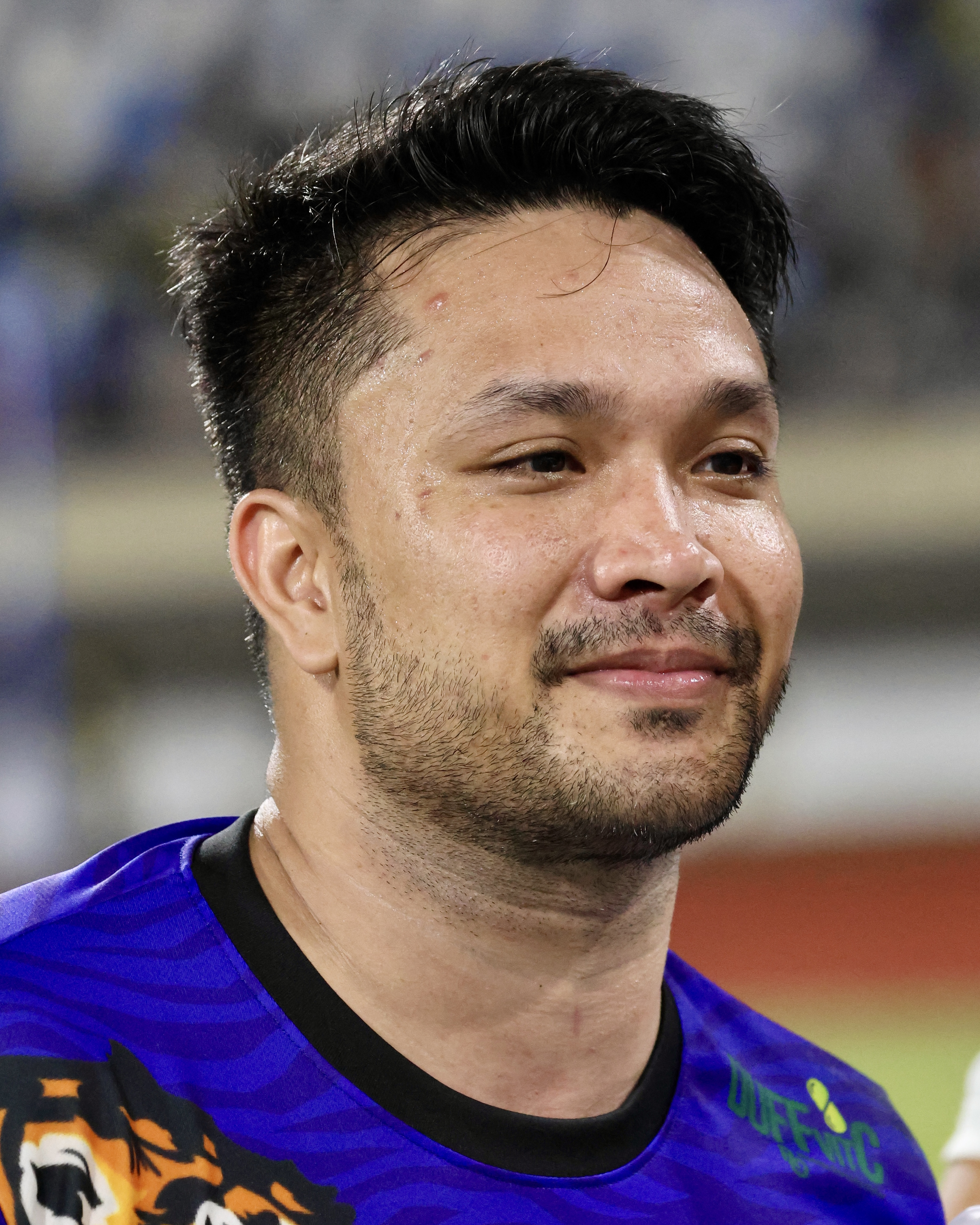
- Shahrizal in 2024
- Born: Muhammad Shahrizal Jaszle bin Jasmin; 30 July 1988 (age 37); Kampung Baru, Kuala Lumpur, Malaysia
- Occupations: Actor; model
- Years active: 2008–present
- Political party: United Malays National Organisation
- Spouse: Nur Hanis Husna (m. 2015)

Muhammad Shahrizal Jaszle bin Jasmin (born 30 July 1988), commonly known by his stage name Shahz Jaszle, is a Malaysian actor and model.

== Career ==
Shahrizal is a mixed-blood Malaysian, Chinese, and Pakistani, has been working in the Malaysian entertainment industry since 2006. He began with the RTM TV drama series Tari Tirana and the Remaja Naratif TV program.

On 16 May 2013, the Petaling Regional Sharia Low Court issued an order for Shahrizal to appear in court on allegations of khalwat against a 23-year-old bank employee named Farah Nurizzati Salleh. Judge Abd Halim gave him the command to defend in that sense. The Selangor Islamic Religious Department (Jais) arrested Shahrizal and his partner Farah near the Sri Subang Park Apartment at approximately 3.30 am following a public complaint. On 13 November, Farah, on the other hand, acknowledged her mistake and the court fined her a maximum of RM3,000.

On 21 February 2014, Shahrizal named his sister as his manager since he didn't trust outsiders following his 2013 arrest. In addition, he stated that, in light of the previous events, he wanted to be extra cautious and that's why his mother Zaleha, accompanied him everywhere, even to the filming location and entertainment events.

Despite the constant offers to perform, Shahrizal has opted to remain mute on social media and at work since his arrest in 2013. He said that his wife and kids are also involved, and that there could be an age component to this. He returns home from the depiction set with little opportunity to socialise. He needs to take care of home problems and send his children to school. His sole thought was that he didn't want kids to be challenging in the future.

In 2024, Shahrizal attempted to shed 10 kilograms (22 lb) of weight in just 23 days in order to fulfill a character requirement for his most recent movie. He claims that the main character in the movie Mayang forced him to follow a diet that consisted of only 500 calories per day while he was a university student. In order to accelerate metabolism and reduce fat without making people hungry, the diet calls for injecting HCG. He said that the HCG diet he followed was in accordance to a clinic's advice and guidance.

== Personal life ==
On 8 December 2012, Shahrizal became engaged to Redwani Putri; nevertheless, their engagement ended in June 2013. He said that he still hasn't started any wedding planning for his fiancé Redzwani Putri, whose wedding is slated for later 2014. On 1 May 2015, he officially wed Nur Hanis Husna binti Mohamad Nadzree.

== Filmography ==
=== Film ===
Year	Title	Role	Notes
2012	Azura	Zack Zakaria	Debut film
2014	Kami Histeria	College student	Star actor
2017	Lebuhraya Ke Neraka	Jeff	

=== Drama ===
Year	Title	Role	TV channel	Notes
2008	Luna Fantasiku	Fendi	Gua.com.my	Debut drama
2009	Bio-Nik	Adi (Abdul Hadi)	TV3	
2009	Tari Tirana	Ashraf	TV3	
2010	Asmara	Asmara	TV3	
2010	Bola Cinta	Haziq	TV2	
2010	Telah Dihalalkan Epal Itu	Khalim	TV AlHijrah	
2010	Mistik Alam Hitam		Astro Ria & Astro Prima	Episode: "Kamera"
2011	Bunga April	Johar	TV3	
2011	Pengantin Untuk Dijual	Iskandar	Astro Box Office	
2011	Gemilang	Saifullah	TV3	
2011	Asmara 2	Asmara	TV3	
2011	Ayu Suraya	Kamal	Astro Prima	
2011	Tahajjud Cinta	Azihan	TV3	
2012	Atas Nama Cinta	Tengku Farish	TV3	
2012	3 Janji	Khursyi / Kamil	TV3	
2013	Cinta Qaseh	Arash	TV3	
2013	Rindu Bertamu Di Abu Dhabi	Faiz	TV3	
2013	Sehangat Asmara	Azman		
2013	Iman Nabila	Iman	TV3	
2013	Kampung Girl	Faisal	TV3	
2014	Lembayung Kasihmu	Fansuri	TV2	
2014	Kristal Maya	Ezam	TV3	
2015	Tabir Zulaikha	Ammar	TV3	
2015	Bidadari	Adi	TV3	
2015	Maria Terindah	Aris	HyppTV	
2015	Abang Sado Jemur Kain	Marzuki	TV3	
2016	Nasi Minyak Kuah Cinta	Dr Haris	TV3	
2016	Lara Aishah	Zack	Astro Prima	
2016	Bagaikan Kelip-Kelip	Fairuz	TV9	
2016	Cinta Masam Manis	Erman	TV3	
2017	Black Belt Kaler Pink	Ustaz Salam	Astro Warna	
2017	Titian Cinta	Daniel	TV3	
2018	Melankolia	Borhan	TV3	
2018	Cinta Fatamorgana	Jamil	TV3	
2018	Isteri Untuk Diiktiraf	Tengku Wafie	TV1	
2018	Cinta Bukan Kristal	Fahmi	TV3	
2019	Setelah Cinta Itu Pergi	Muiz Lukman	TV3	
2019	Cinta Tanpa Henti	Arman	TV3	
2019	Jodoh-Jodoh Annisa	Alex	Astro Prima	
2019	Iktibar		TV3	Episode: Kerana Cemburu
2019	30 Pesanan Suara	Azham	TV3	
2020	Rindu Yang Terindah	Dr Kamal	TV3	
2020	Beri Sedikit Waktu	Farhan	TV3	
2021	Ayahanda	Ramli	TV3	
2022	Cinta Amnesia	Izman	TV3	
2022	Bila Hati Memilih Dia	Fadhil	TV3	
2022	Lockdown 2		Astro Ria	
2022	Cinta Hilang Kata	Rain Akhtar	Astro Prima	
2022	Takdir Cinta Dhia	Huzair	Astro Prima	
2023	Serpihan Sayang	Syakir	TV3	
2023	Nak Dengar Cerita Hantu?		DEGUP	
2023	Sempurnakah Cinta Kita?	Alif	Awesome TV	

=== Telefilm ===
Tahun	Tajuk	Watak	Saluran TV
2008	Anak Emak		TV1
2009	Dari Mata Ke Hati		TV1
2009	Bila Mama Pakai Celana		TV2
2011	Pondok Ingatan Cinta	Farish	TV1
2011	Kemaafan Sakura	Aliff	TV3
2012	Landasan Cinta	Kapten Umar	TV3
2013	Dari Sinar Mata	Syamil	TV3
2014	Menghitung Rahmat Tuhan	Hadi	TV9
2015	Sawan	Aliff	TV3
2016	Air Mata Xinjiang		TV2
2017	Izinkan Aku Menebus Dosa	Nazri	TV9
2018	Adakah Aku Bersalah?	Bront	TV3
2018	Neraka Kasih Maisarah	Budin	TV3
2019	Cinta Disertasi		TV1

=== Television ===
Year	Title	TV channel	Notes
2012	Betul ke bohong?	Astro Warna	Season 1; Episode 13
2017	Ketuk-Ketuk Ramadan	TV1	Episode 2

== Awards ==
Year	Award	Category	Decision
2010	23rd Malaysian Film Festival	Best Men's Clothing	Won
2010	Cosmopolitan Fun, Fearless, Fabulous 2010 Award	The Warmest Boys Award	Nominated
2010	2010 Daily News Popular Star Award	Popular Male New Artist	Won
