= Estranged (band) =

Malaysian alternative rock band

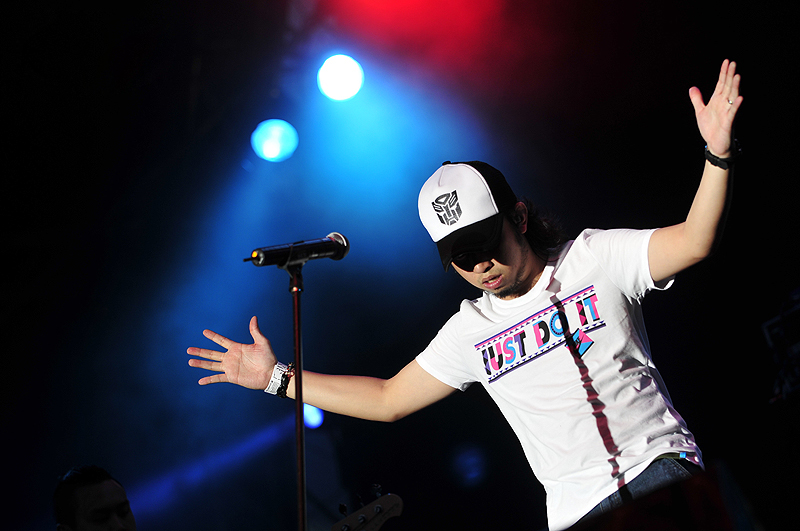
- Estranged performing during 2009 Sunburst KL

Background information
- Origin: Sabah, Malaysia
- Genres: Alternative rock, pop rock
- Years active: 2001–present
- Label: Bornaya Records
- Members: Richael Lawrence "Rich" Gimbang; Nor Hanafi Noor Hadi; Solihuddin Hormat (Din Hormatov)
- Past members: Chow Ken Chung; Adzrai Zainal; Alda Evan Tan; Azwin Andy Malik; Lionel Chan
- Website: www.estranged.my

Estranged is a Malaysian alternative rock band that formed in Damansara, Kuala Lumpur in 2001. Currently comprising vocalist Rich Gimbang –who was known as a contestant in the 4th season of Akademi Fantasia–, lead guitarist Nor Hanafi and rhythm guitarist Din Hormatov, the band have released three full-length albums: In Hating Memory (2004), Remain Unknown (2008), Anugerah Hidup (2013) and an extended play (EP): Sepenuhnya Vol. 1 (2016). The band also have released a song called "Odoi" in 2018.

== History ==
Estranged was established in 2001 when two Sabahans, Rich Gimbang and Din Hormatov met while pursue their studies in music at the International College of Music (ICOM) in Kuala Lumpur. The band's name was inspired by the American rock band, Guns N' Roses' 1994 single of the same name. They held their first live show in 2001, at TwelveSI. The band went through many changes to its line-up, including original lead guitarist Adzrai Zainal departing to further his studies, replaced by Nor Hanafi Noor Hadi, a grunge-influenced guitarist. Estranged participated in the "Yamaha Asian Beat Competition" in 2001, finishing 2nd runner-up.

After Rock The World 4 (Malaysia's annual rock festival), the band started work on their debut album In Hating Memory, released in December 2004, includes 10 English tracks. Their first single "Velocity" started receiving airplay in June 2005, followed by the second single "Chocolate Syrup". Both singles were accompanied by music videos, directed by Motion Notion and Tan Chee Meng, respectively.

In Hating Memory was re-released in 2007 as a repackaged album, with addition of one Malay track, "Itu Kamu" which earned them a mainstream success and won the Best Song at the Anugerah Juara Lagu 2007.

Estranged released their second album, Remain Unknown in October 2008, with four singles released from the album. This is their first album following the departure of their bassist, Chow Ken Chung who left in 2007. This album earned Estranged an eighth nomination at the Anugerah Industri Muzik 2009.

The band played alongside The All-American Rejects, Hoobastank, Raygun, Boys Like Girls, Pixie Lott, Misha Omar, and Kasabian as one of the live acts at Asia's very first MTV World Stage Live in Malaysia concert that was held in Malaysia on 15 August 2009.

In 2013, the band released their third studio album and their very first Malay album, Anugerah Hidup, with "Pengganti" and "Baru" released as singles. The album contains 10 tracks including a cover version of The Cranberries song, "Linger". Anugerah Hidup would be the last studio album Estranged recorded and released prior to the departure of their drummer, Azwin Andy in 2015 due to family and work commitments.

In 2016, Estranged released their debut EP, Sepenuhnya Vol. 1, contains five tracks including its main single, "Hancur Aku" featuring Malaysian actress, Fazura. To promote the EP, the band embarked a promotional tour, Konsert Estranged Sepenuhnya Vol. 1 which took place in Kilang Bateri, Johor Bahru, Johor on 3 February 2017. They also embarked another tour to promote the EP, titled Konsert Estranged Sepenuhnya: Setia Sedekad, Itu Kamu which took place at the Wisma Auditorium Bentley on 13 May.

Estranged released new single, "Milik Ku" on 15 September 2018. The band decided to not sold the single for download and streaming on iTunes, YouTube and Spotify, and only available via CD format which can be purchased at their Facebook page. The CD single sold-well during the 2019 Borneo Electric Mission Tour.

== Band members ==
Current members

- Rich Gimbang – vocals (2001–present)
- Din Hormatov – rhythm guitar, backing vocals (2001–present)
- Nor Hanafi Noor Hadi – lead guitar (2005–present)

Former members

- Alda Evan Tan – bass (2001)
- Lionel Chan – drums (2001–2002)
- Adzrai Zainal – lead guitar (2001–2005)
- Chow Ken Chung – bass (2001–2007)
- Azwin Andy Malik – drums (2002–2015)

== Discography ==
=== Studio albums ===
- In Hating Memory (2004), re-released in 2007
- Remain Unknown (2008)
- Anugerah Hidup (2013)
- Sepenuhnya Vol. 2 (2022)

=== EP ===
- Sepenuhnya Vol. 1 (2016)

=== Singles ===
- "Odoi" (2018)
- "Sebelum dan Selepas" (2018)
- "Milik Ku" (2018)
- "Mau" (2019)
- "Main Bubut" (2021)
- "Mari Sumazau" (2022)
- "Tatapan Terakhir" (2022)
- "Take A Bow" (2022)
- "Diputuskan" featuring Masterpiece (2023)

== Concerts and tours ==
- 2003
  - Rock The World 4
  - MTV's Search for Linkin Park
  - AXN
- 2004
  - Asian X – Games
  - 8TV's late night talk show Latte@8
- 2005
  - AXN
  - Hitz.tv's birthday bash
- 2006
  - Hitz.tv's birthday bash
  - Konsert Gemilang Anugerah Era
- 2007
  - Rock The World 7
  - Hot FM Big Jam Kuala Lumpur
  - Konsert Akademi Fantasia Season 5 Episode 5
  - MTV LIVE with Good Charlotte
  - Muzik Muzik
  - Anugerah Planet Muzik
  - Festival Muzik Borneo
  - Hot FM's Mini Jam Tours
  - 8TV's Campus Tour
  - Muzik Muzik Semifinals
  - Anugerah Juara Lagu ke-22
- 2009
  - MTV World Stage Live in Malaysia
- 2012
  - William Beckett (of The Academy Is...) Live in KL
- 2016
  - Konsert Estranged Sepenuhnya Vol. 1
- 2017
  - Konsert Estranged Sepenuhnya: Setia Sedekad, Itu Kamu

== Awards and nominations ==
- 2006
  - Nominated for the "Favourite Local English Artiste" at the Anugerah Era
  - Won the "Favourite Local English Artiste" at the Anugerah Era
  - Nominated for two categories "Best Rock" and "Best Video" at the Hitz.fm Malaysian English Top 10 Awards
  - Won the "Best Rock" category at the hitz.fm's Malaysia English Top 10 Awards
  - Won the "Best Video" category at the hitz.fm's Malaysia English Top 10 Awards
- 2007
  - Nominated for the Favourite Rock Band category at the Anugerah Era
  - Nominated for the Favourite Rock Hit at the Anugerah Era
  - Finalist for 22nd Anugerah Juara Lagu
- 2008
  - Won the Pop/Rock Category at the 22nd Anugerah Juara Lagu
  - Won the Best Song Award category at the 22nd Anugerah Juara Lagu
  - Won the Most Popular Group category at the Anugerah Planet Muzik
  - Won the Most Popular Song category at the Anugerah Planet Muzik
  - Nominated for the Best New Artist category at the 15th Anugerah Industri Muzik
  - Nominated for the Song of the Year category at the 15th Anugerah Industri Muzik
