= Remy Ishak =

Malaysian actor (born 1982)

Yang Berbahagia Datuk Remy Ishak DPSM
- ريمي إسحاق
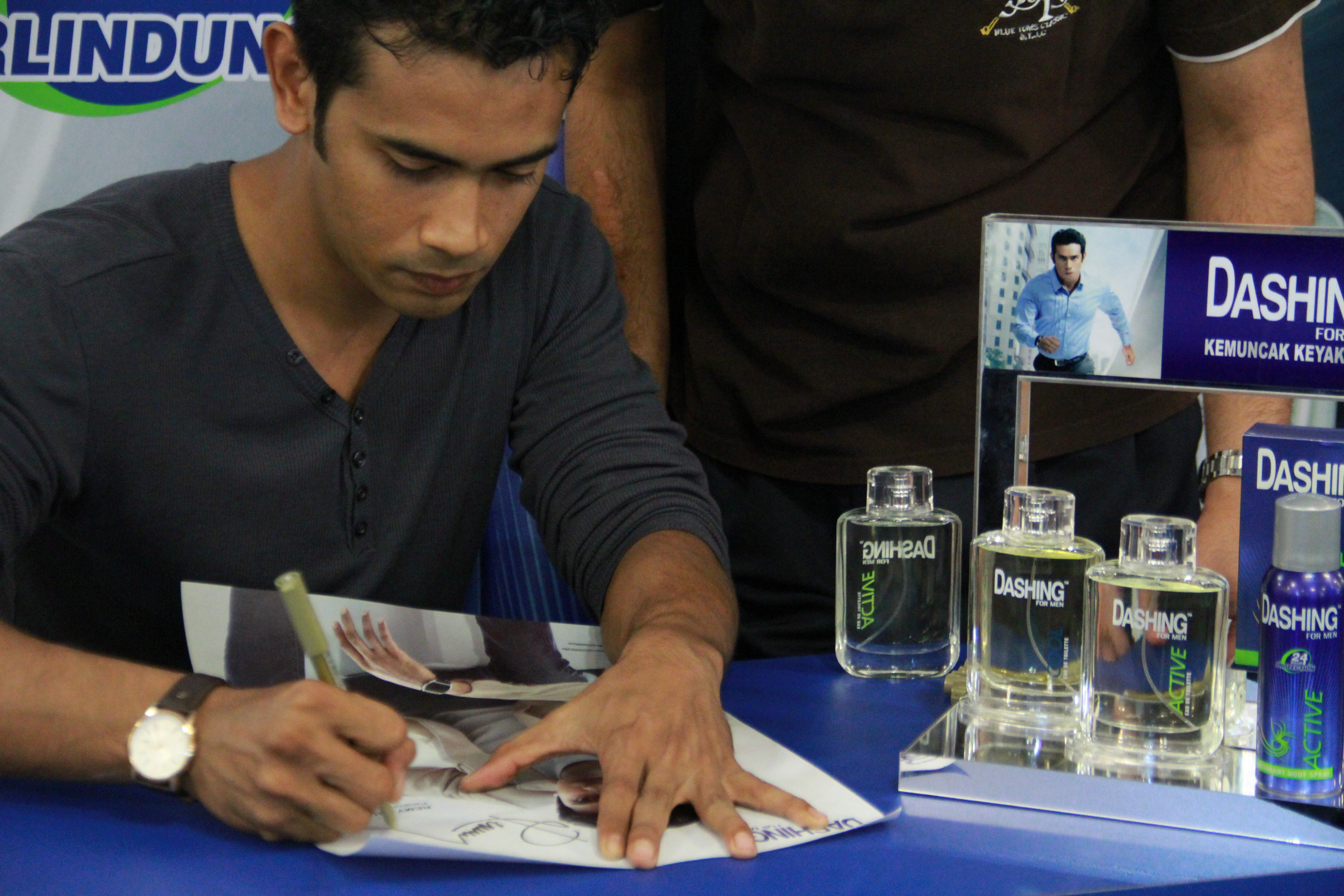
- Remy Ishak sign on Dashing Roadshow event.
- Born: Mohammad Zalimei bin Ishak; April 11, 1982 (age 44); Melaka, Malaysia
- Occupations: Actor; Host Television; Model; Singer
- Years active: 2005–present
- Spouse: Datin Roszaliza @ Ezza Yusof (m. 2021)
- Children: 1

Datuk Mohammad Zalimei bin Ishak (born on 11 April 1982), better known by his stage name as Remy Ishak is a Malaysian actor who was born in Melaka. He was first introduced to the film industry by independent director Osman Ali in 2006. He gained fame for his performance in Nur Kasih directed by Kabir Bhatia, which aired on TV3 in 2009. He later starred in the 2018 film Pulang.

== Personal life ==
Remy Ishak married businesswoman Roszaliza "Ezza" Yusof on 21 August 2021 at Masjid Negara after having previously ending their initial engagement in 2019.

== Honours ==
=== Honours of Malaysia ===
- Malacca
  - Companion Class II of the Exalted Order of Malacca (DPSM) – Datuk (2024)

== Filmography ==
=== Film ===
Year	Title	Role	Notes
2007	Anak Halal	Shah	
2007	Comolot	Daniel	Short film
2008	Bernafas Dalam Lumpur	Faiz	
2009	Duhai Si Pari-Pari	Budi	
2010	Hooperz	Nik	
2010	Evolusi KL Drift 2	ASP Kamal	
2011	Cun!	Atan	
2011	Nur Kasih The Movie	Adam	
2012	Jiwa Taiko	Firman Mustaqim	
2012	Aku, Kau & Dia	Izlan / Haris	
2012	29 Februari	Budi	
2012	Hantu Kapcai	Tiger	
2013	Sembunyi: Amukan Azazil	Kamal	
2013	Kolumpo	Kedai Mamak Customers 1	
2014	Sejoli: Misi Cantas Cinta	Hardy	
2014	CEO	Adam	
2015	Pilot Cafe	Rashid	
2015	Bravo 5	Leftenan Azri	
2016	Beautiful Pain	Azim	
2016	Upin & Ipin: Jeng Jeng Jeng!	Bo	
2017	Kau Takdirku	Kamar	
2018	Pulang	Othman	
2018	Rise: Ini Kalilah	Coperal Azman	
2018	Langsuir	Kubu	
2019	Bu, Kasih Suci	Hafiz	
2019	Sangkar	Johan 'Jedi' Kamaruddin	
2019	Revenge of the Pontianak	Khalid	
2020	Tyickoouns	Mannan	
2021	Proksi	Aqil	
2023	Harum Malam	Jamil	
2024	The Experts Selamatkan Raya	Amiruddin	Short film
2024	The Experts	Amiruddin	
2025	Soloz: Game of Life	Abang Ketam	Special appearances
2025	6 Jilake	Talam	
2025	Keluang Man	Shamsir	

=== Television series ===
Year	Title	Role	TV channel	Notes
2007	Tidak Pernah Ku Sesali	Ikhwan	TV1	
2008	Sindarela	Tengku Haidar	TV3	
2008	Obsesi	Tengku Azuddin	TV3	
2008	Ai d'Beijing	Tarmizi	TV3	
2008	Awan Dania (Season 1)	Iman	Astro Ria	
2009	Keliwon (Season 1)	Husin	TV3	Episode: "Puja"
2009	Nur Kasih	Adam	TV3	
2009	Tower 13	Laboratory Officer	TV3	Special appearance
2009–2010	Suraya	Azman	TV3	
2010	Arjuna	Arjuna	TV3	
2011	Tahajjud Cinta	Solahudin	TV3	
2012	Tanah Kubur (Season 4)	Mahad	Astro Oasis	Episode: "Pengkid"
2012	Cinta Dalam Hati	Dino Abadi	TV1	
2013	Cinta Jangan Pergi	Khalil	TV9	
2013	Ku Cinta Kau Seorang	Helmi	TV3	
2014	Jiwa	Iskandar	TV3	
2014	Kasih Berbisik	Imran	TV3 Mediacorp Suria	
2014	Oh! Bama	Baharom	TV2	
2014	Mencari Cinta	Razlan	TV1	
2014–2015	Satu Hari	Isfahan	TV9	
2014–2015	Antidot	Fatah	TV3	
2015	Mail & Sudin Sambut Ramadan	Mail	Astro Oasis	
2016	Rumi & Jawi	Rumi	Astro Prima	
2016	Kapsul Mail & Sudin Naik Haji	Mail	Astro Oasis	
2016	Permata Rasul	Al-Layth Ibn Sa'd	Astro Oasis	
2017	Cik Serba Tahu	Karl Adham	Astro Ria	
2017	Khabar Dari Casablanca	Farhan	TV2	
2017	Anak Merdeka	Salleh	Astro Prima	5 episodes
2017	Coklat	Yamin	TV1	
2017	Kekasih Paksa Rela	Adham	TV3	
2018	Dosa: Sacred Sin	Farid	Astro First Exclusive	
2018	Lelaki Kiriman Tuhan	Iqbal Raid	Astro Oasis	
2018	Pujaan Hati Kanda	Megat Danish / Danny	TV3	
2019	Imaan	Hezrey	Astro Ria	
2019	Ombak Rindu The Series	Hariz Abdullah	Iflix	
2019–2021	Keluarga Baha Don	Jo Don	Viu	
2020	Bukan Gadis Biasa	Rayyan	TV3	
2020	Safi Eliksir Ke Hatimu	Amir Nasir	TV3	
2020	Hati Yang Tersakiti	Haris	TV3	
2022	Jangan Menangis Cinta	Zafran Zahim	Astro Ria	
2022	Kuasa	Dayyan	Astro Citra	
2023	Hijrah Jannah	Syawal Fitri	Astro Ria	
2024	Restu	Razak	IQIYI	
2024	The Secret	Dr. Amir	Viu	
2024–2025	Marina	Haqiem	Tonton	

=== Telemovie ===
Year	Title	Role	TV channel
2007	Mininovella: Di Penghujung Senja	Azlan	TV9
2008	Noda Semalam		TV3
2008	Jalan Pintas ke Neraka	Razlan	TV3
2008	Biarkan Aku Berdiri	Jeffri	TV2
2008	Iktikaf	Shawal	TV3
2008	Takbiratul Ihram	Kadim	Astro Prima
2008	Sesuci Kasih		TV3
2008	Cinta Si 3 Teruna	Faris	TV2
2009	Bisikan Subuh	Aidid	TV3
2009	Pabila Syaitan Berbisik	Brian	TV2
2010	Mat Bunga	Harry	TV2
2010	Keabadian Cinta	Ehsan	Astro Citra
2010	Sabar	Hussin Bangla	TV3
2010	Air Mata Nur Salina	Fakar	TV3
2010	Raya Musim Luruh	Remi	TV3
2010	Pun Pun	Hafiz	TV2
2010	Masihkah Ada Sinar	Mazlan	TV1
2011	Bukan Untukku	Rashid	TV1
2011	Payung Emas	Hidayat	TV3
2011	Aduh Sayang	Shidi	TV3
2012	Runtuhnya Sebuah Dosa	Rashidi	TV3
2012	Cinta Si Tukang Kasut	Badrul	Astro Prima
2012	Kau Untukku	Fuad	Astro Box Office
2012	Pulut Kacau Meriam Kabait	Bayu Armada Jiwa	Astro Prima
2012	Sabar Tak Sabar	Salman	TV3
2012	Pelita Buluh Tok Wan	Razak	TV3
2013	Ku Pinang Kau Dengan Bismillah	Raikal	Astro Prima
2013	XOXO	Haziq	TV9
2013	Destinasi Cinta Sara	Iman	Astro Ria
2014	Pintu Lain Ke Syurga	Haris	TV3
2014	Anak Aku Bukan Milik Aku	Hidayat	TV3
2014	Takdir Cinta	Doktor Zaid	Astro Box Office
2014	7 Jam	Inspector Shahrul	TV9
2014	Insaf	Amir	TV2
2014	Warkah Kehidupan	Amin	TV Alhijrah
2014	Ketupat Rendang Keju	Adam	Astro Warna
2014	Atie Setan	Firdaus Helmi	Astro Prima
2015	Melrose	Dr. Zawawi	Astro Citra
2015	Cintaku Tertinggal Di Mostar	Farid	TV3
2015	Parut Sarajevo	Reza	TV9
2015	Seutas Tasbih Biru	Ahmad	Astro Oasis
2016	Pangkalan Batu 6	Li	Astro Citra
2016	Tercipta Untukku	Adil	Astro First Exclusive
2016	Bila Artis Balik Kampung Beraya	Arman Johari	Astro Prima
2017	Pesan Dari Tuhan	Jamil	TV2
2017	Komplot	Zali	Astro Citra
2017	Purnama	Purnama	TV3
2017	Siapa Dia Sebenarnya	Qalif	TV3
2018	Hari Terakhir Seorang Pengurus	Nasir	Astro Citra
2018	Bahulu Untuk Opah	Badrul	TV3
2018	Andai Ku Cinta Lagi	Zaman	TV2
2019	Pujaan Hati Kanda Raya	Megat Danish / Danny	TV3
2020	Cucu Nek Putih	Sein	Astro Citra
2021	Doa Terindah	Ustaz Amri	TV1
2023	Matin	Hilman	TV1
2023	Bro Jenin	Mat Jenin	Astro Ria

=== Television show ===
Year	Title	Role	TV channel	Notes
2015	Hala 3	Host	Astro Prima	
2018–19	Maharaja Lawak Mega 2018	Jury	Astro Warna	with Douglas Lim, Tya Arifin & Scha Alyahya
2020–22	The Masked Singer Malaysia	Jury	Astro Warna	with Datuk Aznil Nawawi, Ella, Raja Azura, Micheal Ang, Nabila Huda, Zizan Razak, Angah Raja Lawak & Ramona Zamzam
2021	Roda Panas	Host	Naura	

=== Music video ===
Year	Song title	Role	Artist
2011	"Kisah Hati"	Lead cast	Alyah
2016	"Raniaku"	Azman	Aizat Amdan
2018	"Jutaan Purnama"	Lead cast	Alyah

=== Theatre ===
Year	Title	Role
2009	Natrah	Mansor Adabi
2010	Natrah 2	Mansor Adabi
2014	Takhta 3 Ratu	Megat Panji Alam
2015	Sekuntum Mawar Merah	Rashid
2015	Maduku Kalut Returns	Selamat
2016	Muzikal Randai Cindua Mato	Cindua Mato
2017	Tun Fatimah: Serikandi Empayar Melaka	Sultan Mahmud Shah

=== Radio drama ===
Year	Title	Role	Radio station
2016	Dramatik Kool: Ikhlas Medina	Ikhlas	Kool FM
2018	Dramatik Kool: Cinta Gila	Farel	Kool FM

== Discography ==
=== Soundtrack appearances ===
Year	Title	Notes
2011	"Cun Selalu" (with Maya Karin)	Cun! OST
2012	"Kelip-Kelip"	29 Februari OST

== Awards and nominations ==
=== Malaysia Film Festival ===
Year	Category	Work	Result
2010	Most Promising Actor	Evolusi KL Drift 2	Nominated
2011	Best Actor	Nur Kasih The Movie	Nominated
2019	Best Actor	Pulang	Nominated
2021	Best Supporting Actor	Sangkar	Won

=== Bintang Popular Berita Harian Awards ===
Year	Category	Work / nominee	Result
2010	Most Popular TV Actor	Nur Kasih	Won
2011	Most Popular Film Actor	Evolusi KL Drift 2	Nominated
2011	Most Popular TV Actor	Arjuna	Won
2012	Most Popular TV Actor	Tahajjud Cinta	Nominated
2016	Most Popular Film Actor	Pilot Cafe	Nominated
2016	Most Popular TV Actor	Mail & Sudin Sambut Ramadan	Nominated
2017	Most Popular Film Actor	Beautiful Pain	Nominated
2018	Most Popular TV Actor	Kekasih Paksa Rela	Nominated
2018	Best Couple – Drama (with Intan Najuwa)	—	Nominated
2018	Best Couple – Film (with Ezzaty Abdullah)	Kau Takdirku	Nominated
2019	Most Popular Film Actor	Pulang	Nominated
2019	Best Couple – Film (with Mira Filzah)	Rise: Ini Kalilah	Nominated
2019	Most Popular TV Actor	Pujaan Hati Kanda	Nominated
2019	Best Couple – Drama (with Mira Filzah)	—	Won
2019	Best Couple – Drama (with Mira Filzah)	Lelaki Kiriman Tuhan	Nominated
2020	Most Popular Film Actor	Sangkar	Nominated
2020	Most Popular TV Actor	Imaan	Nominated
2020	Best Couple – Film (with Nadiya Nisaa)	Bu, Kasih Suci	Nominated
2020	Best Couple – Film (with Fazura)	Revenge of the Pontianak	Nominated
2021	Most Popular TV Actor	Hati Yang Tersakiti	Nominated
2021	Best Couple – Drama (with Nad Zainal)	—	Nominated

=== Skrin Awards ===
Year	Category	Work	Result
2009	Best Supporting Actor – Drama	Jalan Pintas ke Neraka	Nominated
2011	Best Actor – Drama	Airmata Nur Salina	Nominated
2011	Best Actor – Film	Cun!	Won
2013	Best Actor – Film	29 Februari	Nominated
2017	Best Supporting Actor – Drama	Pesan Dari Tuhan	Won
2018	Best Actor – Film	Pulang	Nominated

=== Other awards ===
Award	Year	Category	Work / nominee	Result
ASEAN International Film Festival and Awards	2019	Best Actor	Pulang	Nominated
Asian Academy Creative Awards	2018	Best Supporting Actor	Dosa: Sacred Sin	Won
Asian Television Awards	2021	Best Leading Male Performance – Digital	Keluarga Baha Don	Nominated
Blockbuster Awards	2012	Best Leading Actor	Nur Kasih The Movie	Nominated
Blockbuster Awards	2012	Best Film OST (with Maya Karin)	"Cun Selalu"	Nominated
Blockbuster Awards	2013	Best Leading Actor	Jiwa Taiko	Nominated
Blockbuster Awards	2013	Best Villain Character	Hantu Kapcai	Nominated
ContentAsia Awards	2021	Best Male Lead in a TV Programme	Keluarga Baha Don 2	Nominated
Cosmopolitan Fun Fearless Fabulous Awards	2009	Fun Fearless Fabulous – Best Couple (with Tiz Zaqyah)	Nur Kasih	Nominated
Drama Sangat Awards	2021	Best Actor	Hati Yang Tersakiti	Nominated
Hip TV Party Awards	2010	Romeo Artist Award	Remy Ishak	Nominated
Kuala Lumpur Drama Festival	2019	Choice Actor	Kekasih Paksa Rela	Nominated
Kuala Lumpur Drama Festival	2019	Choice Couple (with Intan Najuwa)	—	Nominated
Kuala Lumpur Film Critics Assembly Awards	2018	Best Actor	Pulang	Won
Kuala Lumpur Film Critics Assembly Awards	2020	Best Supporting Actor	Sangkar	Nominated
Lawak Warna Awards	2015	Best Comedy Actor	Atie Setan	Nominated
MeleTOP Era Awards	2019	Popular TV Actor	Lelaki Kiriman Tuhan	Nominated
MeleTOP Era Awards	2019	Popular Film Star	Pulang	Nominated
MeleTOP Era Awards	2019	Popular Fashion	Remy Ishak	Nominated
MeleTOP Era Awards	2020	Popular Film Star	Sangkar	Nominated
Melodi Awards	2013	Favorite Male Artist	Remy Ishak	Won
Shout! Awards	2010	Best On Screen Chemistry (with Tiz Zaqyah)	Nur Kasih	Nominated
Shout! Awards	2010	Hot Guy Award	Remy Ishak	Nominated
Shout! Awards	2012	Hot Guy Award	Remy Ishak	Nominated
Shout! Awards	2012	Best On Screen Chemistry (with Tiz Zaqyah)	Nur Kasih The Movie	Nominated
Stail EH! Awards	2010	Handsome Male Celebrity	Remy Ishak	Nominated
Stail EH! Awards	2010	Sexiest Male Celebrity	Remy Ishak	Won
Stail EH! Awards	2012	Best Body – Male	Remy Ishak	Nominated
Stail EH! Awards	2014	Best Body – Male	Remy Ishak	Nominated
Stail EH! Awards	2014	Sexiest Male Celebrity	Remy Ishak	Nominated
Stail EH! Awards	2016	Best Body – Male	Remy Ishak	Won
Stail EH! Awards	2016	Sexiest Male Celebrity	Remy Ishak	Nominated
Stail EH! Awards	2017	Sexiest Male Celebrity	Remy Ishak	Nominated
Stail EH! Awards	2019	Sexiest Male Celebrity	Remy Ishak	Won
Telenovela Awards	2018	Best Actor – Telenovela	Cik Serba Tahu	Nominated
Telenovela Awards	2019	Best Actor – Telenovela	Pujaan Hati Kanda	Nominated
Telenovela Awards	2019	Popular Actor – Telenovela	Pujaan Hati Kanda, Lelaki Kiriman Tuhan	Won
Telenovela Awards	2019	Popular Actor – Film	Pulang	Won
