= Hazama =

Hazama is a Japanese surname. Notable people with the surname include:

- Chuck Hazama (1932–2021), American politician
- Kanpei Hazama (間 寛平) born 1949, Japanese actor in the 1996 film Mari's Prey
- Michio Hazama (羽佐間 道夫; born 1933), Japanese voice actor and narrator
- Miho Hazama (挾間 美帆; born 1986), Japanese composer and jazz musician

== Fictional characters ==
- Hazama (ハザマ), a fictional character from the BlazBlue series of fighting games.
- Hazama Itsuru, a fictional character from the anime 8 Man After
- Kan'ichi Hazama (間 貫一), a character in Ozaki Kōyō's The Golden Demon.
- Kirara Hazama (狭間 綺羅々), a character in the manga series Assassination Classroom
- Kurō Hazama (間 黒男), Black Jack's real name.

== See also ==
- Hazama Ando, a Japanese construction corporation
