= 29 Februari =

February 29
- Malay: 29 Februari
- Directed by: Edry Abdul Halim
- Written by: Amir Hafizi; Edry Abdul Halim
- Screenplay by: Edry Abdul Halim
- Produced by: Norman Abdul Halim; Edry Abdul Halim; Yusry Abdul Halim
- Starring: Remy Ishak; Jojo Goh; Izzue Islam
- Production company: KRU Studios
- Release dates: 30 August 2012 (Malaysia, Singapore and Brunei)
- Running time: 104 minutes
- Country: Malaysia
- Language: Malay
- Budget: MYR 3.5 million
- Box office: MYR 0.37 million

29 Februari (English: February 29) is a 2012 Malaysian Malay-language fantasy romantic drama film produced by KRU Studios, touted as the country's first stereoscopic 3D theatrical release. Directed by Edry Abdul Halim, 29 Februari tells of a man who only ages once every four years due to being born on 29 February, resulting in him ageing far slower than his peers. The film was theatrically released in 3D and digital 2D format in Malaysia, Singapore and Brunei on 30 August 2012.

== Plot ==
The movie begins in the late 19th century when Halim bin Kasim (Riz Amin), an employee of the British colonial government, and his wife, Sakinah (Dian P. Ramlee), witness a shooting star in the sky. Halim wants to make a wish, but Sakinah cautions him not to get carried away by colonial culture and to respect the local Malay ritual.

On the morning of 29 February 1896, Halim receives news that his wife is going through labour. He rushes home from work to celebrate the birth of their son. They settle on the name "Budi" for the child. However, Budi bears a curse: he only ages every four years, stemming from the fact that he is born on a leap year, which only occurs once every four years.

The consequences of this 'curse' begin to take on greater significance. In 1941, Budi, who was supposed to be 45 years old, gets bullied by other boys as he still appears to be in his young teens. Because of this, he finds it tough to get along with his "peers". At the end of 1941, the Japanese invaded Malaya. Budi's parents, who were allegedly "conspiring with the British", get beheaded for the new colonial policy of "Asia for Asians".

Around the Malayan Declaration of Independence in 1957, Budi (Remy Ishak), amidst his adolescence, sells wicker baskets with his impaired friend, Razak (Izzue Islam), with whom he grew up at the orphanage. When Budi bumped into a pair of sisters, he fell in love with one of them, particularly Ho Lai Lai or Lily (Jojo Goh).

The feeling of love blooming between Budi and Lily is unveiled through rendezvous by the creek, and a visit to Budi's prior residence, enlivened with songs composed by Budi's humming love for Lily. Nonetheless, Lily's relatives, particularly her father, Mr. Ho (Chew Kin Wah), are dissatisfied with the relationship, even more so in an attempt to deliver gifts and flowers to Lily for her birthday in 1965, when Budi's presence caused Lily's engagement ceremony with her family's preferred fiancee, Alex, to become a shambles.

Following thereupon, Budi attempts to mend his relationship with Lily by seeking the blessing from her father but ultimately flunked after Mr. Ho flung the ring to the floor, which causes it to leave a dent. Considering this, Lily ran away from home and left her family behind, causing her father to go against Budi at the orphanage. Consequently, Budi himself is thrown out by the orphanage owner (Nam Ron). Budi's chances of reconnecting with Lily increasingly dwindled until, on 13 May 1969, Mr. Ho came to hide in a barbershop frequented by Budi and conveyed that Lily had relocated to Penang. Budi also learned that Razak had fled from the orphanage. This information encourages him to move to Penang.

Decades have passed, yet Budi's intention to meet Lily remains unfulfilled. In 1985, when Budi was in his twenties, he nearly met Razak incidentally, who is now elderly and feeble. In addition, he now has a son (Ammar Ashraff).

In 2012, at nearly 30 years old, Budi, now the owner of a florist store, aspires to reestablish his home as a sanctuary. When chasing one of his employees, Arif (Muniff Isa), who has recently been consistently late to work, up to the Penang Hospital, he arrived at a ward designated Ho Lai Lai. Arif turns out to be Lily's nephew. Lily, sadly, is now elderly and dying from end-stage cancer.

The reconciliation threw Budi into a deplorable state, in which he had to deal with the "curse" of only growing every four years, which makes him recall the agony of having lost too many loved ones because of it. Nonetheless, he endures it and tries to spend as much time with the elderly and infirm Lily for as long as he can.

Budi awoke in distress on the morning of the 55th Independence Day, having dreamed of a horrible disturbance that would befall him and Lily, even though his own body was already suffering from health issues. Budi hurried towards the hospital to see Lily one last time, disrupting the Independence Day procession. Budi was hit by a car, which he had imagined in the dream, and was gravely injured. He was transported to Penang Hospital, where he came face to face with Lily on a stretcher and attempted to hand the chipped ring to her but exhaled his last breath in the middle of the moment. Lily's story came to an end a minute later.

Budi's death causes his florist store to close down. Arif discovers from an attorney that Budi had left his estate to Lily. Hence, as Lily's sole successor, Arif can claim Budi's legacy. Therefore, Arif uses this opportunity to his advantage - he inaugurates a new orphanage in Budi's former house as a keepsake for Budi.

== Soundtrack ==
"Kelip-Kelip" (lit. 'Fireflies') is the only song sung by Remy Ishak solely for the film.

"Seperti Dulu" (lit. 'Like Before') from Forteen is also included in this film. Izzue Islam was a group member at the time. He also portrayed the Razak role, another actor who contributed a song to the film soundtrack.
