= List of Malaysian films of 2014 =

This is a list of Malaysian films produced and released in 2014. Most of the film are produced in the Malay language, but there also a significant number of films that are produced in English, Mandarin, Cantonese and Tamil.

== 2014 ==
=== January – March ===
Opening		Title	Director	Cast	Genre	Notes	Ref.
J A N U A R Y	2	Vetti Pasanga	Vimala Perumal	Denes Kumar, Sangeeta Krishnasamy, Magendran Raman, David Anthony, Alvin Martin, Shastan Kurup	Comedy / Drama	Veedu Production; Tamil-language film	
J A N U A R Y	2	Rumah Sewa RM50	M. Jamil	M. Jamil, Amirulshah Rozali, Raji Simran, Mayumi Kasuga, Yulina, Delimawati	Thriller / Mystery	Galaksi Seni	
J A N U A R Y	9	The Transcend	Mindee Ong, Teddy Chin, Ryon Lee, James Wong, Cheng Kam Cheong	Mindee Ong Le Le, Teddy Chin	Horror / Romance	Just Work Entertainment; Mandarin-language film	
J A N U A R Y	9	Balistik	Silver Yee	Rosyam Nor, Jack Lim, Rita Rudaini, Adi Putra, Rykarl Iskandar, Gan Mei Yan	Action / Thriller / Drama	Suhan Movies	
J A N U A R Y	16	Muka Surat Cinta	Pierre Andre	Mikail Andre, Nina Iskandar, Atikah Suhaimie, Hilal Azman, Lan Zailan	Romance	MIG Pictures	
J A N U A R Y	16	Siddhartha	Lee Guohui	Lui Leung Wai, Jennifer Tse, Law Kar Ying	Drama / Historical	Sharp Focus Productions; Mandarin-language film	
J A N U A R Y	23	Laga	Ismail Yaacob	Syazwan Zulkifli, Eman Manan, Tyash Mirashi, Wan Hanafi Su, Marsha Milan Londoh, Yus Jambu	Thriller / Drama / Crime / Action	Business Leader Film Production	
J A N U A R Y	23	Ah Beng: Mission Impossible	Silver Yee	Jack Lim, Jeff Chin, Gan Mei Yan	Action / Comedy	The Film Engine; Cantonese-language film Preceded by Ah Beng The Movie : Three Wishes (2012)	
J A N U A R Y	30	The Journey	Chiu Keng Guan	Ben Andrew Pfeiffer, Lee Sai Peng	Drama / Family	Astro Shaw; Mandarin-, Cantonese-language film	
J A N U A R Y	30	Jangan Pandang Belakang Boleh?	Ismail Bob Hasim	Zalif Sidek, Adibah Yunus, Epy Kodiang, Shima Anuar, Ruminah Sidek	Horror / Comedy	MIG Pictures	
F E B R U A R Y	6	Kami Histeria	Shamyl Othman	Fazura, Diana Danielle, Izzue Islam, Nad Zainal, Sara Ali, Mila Jirin, Afdlin Shauki	Horror / Comedy / Musical	Red Films / Marna Films /Astro Shaw	
F E B R U A R Y	6	Huat Ah! Huat Ah! Huat!	Tan Boon Huat	Aniu, Joyce Cheng	Comedy / Family	VeryGood Movie / Red Films; Mandarin-language film	
F E B R U A R Y	13	Bullets Over Petaling Street	Sampson Yuen, Ho Shih Phin	Debbie Goh, Chen Han Wei, Irene Ang, Jeffrey Cheng, Steve Yap	Action / Comedy / Crime	Juita Viden; Mandarin-language film	
F E B R U A R Y	20	Sejoli: Misi Cantas Cinta	Osman Ali	Maya Karin, Bront Palarae, Izara Aishah, Remy Ishak	Comedy / Romance	Primeworks Studios	
F E B R U A R Y	20	Pasar Malam	Bryan Gao	Victor Wong, Henry Thia, Chris Tong, James Wong	Comedy / Drama	Great Empire Entertainment; Mandarin-language film	
F E B R U A R Y	27	Aku Akan Muncul	Roy Krishnan	Julia Ziegler, Musly Ramli, Jalaluddin Hassan	Drama / Thriller	RM Vision Film Production	
F E B R U A R Y	27	The Beggar Hero	Bryan Gao	Wayne Lai, Henry Thia, Ah Nam, Karen Kong	Action / Comedy	Worldwide Platinum Holdings; Mandarin-, Cantonese-language film	
M A R C H	6	Vennira Iravuggal	R. Perakas Rajaram	Vikadakavi, Sangeeta Krishnasamy, Magendran Rahman, Psychomantra @ Krishna Kumar Lechmana, David Anthony, Aruna Raj Devarajoo	Comedy / Romance	Shine Entertainment; Tamil-language film	
M A R C H	6	Hantu Bukit Cina	T.S. Jeffry, Norliza Ismail	Fouziah Gous, Gambit Saifullah, Siti Fazurina, T.S Jeffry	Horror / Comedy	Sheunik	
M A R C H	13	Fobia Malam Pertama	Murali Abdullah	Julia Perez, Azad Jasmin, Shafnida Shyuhaimi	Comedy / Romance / Drama	Nusantara Seni Karya	
M A R C H	20	Mokissu	Tai Min Hwee	Danny Koo, Yumi Wong SK, Lilian Wenwen, Penny Tai	Comedy	Penerbitan Pelangi; Mandarin-language film	
M A R C H	20	Zombi Kilang Biskut	Mamat Khalid	Awie, Eina Azman, Usop Wilcha, Sofi Jikan	Horror / Comedy	Enjit Semut	
M A R C H	27	In The Dark	Yeo Joon Han	Jennifer Poh, Wang Po Chieh, Candy Lee	Thriller / Horror / Drama / Romance	Amok Films; Mandarin-language film	
M A R C H	27	Lu, Gua Bro!	Ismail Bob Hasim	Zalif Sidek, Epy Kodiang, Nina Iskandar, Rahim Sepahtu, Hamid Gurkha	Comedy / Drama	MIG Pictures	

=== April – June ===
Opening		Title	Director	Cast	Genre	Notes	Ref.
A P R I L	3	Apokalips X	Mamat Khalid	Farid Kamil, Jehan Miskin, Peter Davis, Zoee Tan, Vassan, Adam AF, Iqram Dinzly, Pekin Ibrahim, Miera Leyana, Dazrin Kamarudin, Nur Hazwani, XY Zakaria, Zappa Khalid, Amen Khalid, Azwan Kaswi, Dayana Anak Wayang & Pyan Habib	Action / Science Fiction	Astro Shaw / Tayangan Unggul / Naga VXS	
A P R I L	17	Pintu Neraka	CKW	Raffi Khan, Jefri Jefrizal, Sherie Merlis, Bront Palarae, Sahronizam Noor, Namron	Horror / Action	Cahaya Karya Warna	
A P R I L	24	Sniper	Pierre Andre	Pablo Amirul, Mikail Andre, Fadlan Hazim, Nina Iskandar	Action	MIG Pictures	
M A Y	1	Bahaya Cinta	Yusof Kelana	Adam, Han Dan, Nguyen Duc Hung, Dewi Amanda, Loung Thi Giang, Jalaluddin Hassan	Drama / Romance / Thriller	Sheunik	
M A Y	8	Cara Mengundang Hantu	M. Subash Abdullah	Ruminah Sidek, Imuda, Mak Jah, Mariani	Horror / Family	Genius Parade	
M A Y	15	Ia Wujud	Dharma Aizat	Your, Annam, Tommy, Amad, Arif Adam, Zakaria Zahid, Ahmad Syafiq	Horror	Mangkin Prestij	
M A Y	22	Super Stone	Lai Kim Koon	William Sun, Tung Yew Ngai, Wilson Tin, Brendan Yuen, Candy Lim	Comedy / Crime	Cao Min Pictures; Mandarin-, Cantonese-language film	
M A Y	22	Awak Nak Kahwin Dengan Saya?	Eyra Rahman	Fezrul Khan, Erin Malek, Shima Anuar, Zalif Sidek, Ruminah Sidek	Comedy / Romance	MIG Pictures	
M A Y	29	The Great Lion: Kun Seng Keng	Matt Lai	Alan Kuo, Xiaodong Guo, Henley Hii, Zhou Zhou, Katrina Ho, Michael Chin	Action / Drama / Family	Asia Tropical Films; Mandarin-language film	
M A Y	29	Abang Long Fadil	Syafiq Yusof	Zizan Razak, Kamal Adli, Tauke Raja Lawak, Aaron Aziz, Sofi Jikan, Yassin, Syamsul Yusof	Comedy / Action	Skop Productions; A spin-off the KL Gangster franchise	
J U N E	5	Supersquad The Movie	Rashdan Ramlee	Aaron Aziz, Diana Danielle, Dafi, Radhi Khalid, Marina Tan	Animation / Fiction	Netcarbon	
J U N E	5	Hantu Nan Sempit	Ahmad Idham	Sofi Jikan, Hazama Azi, Atu Zero, Erin Malek, Jue Aziz, Khir Rahman	Action / Comedy	Excellent Pictures	
J U N E	12	CEO	Razaisham Rashid	Remy Ishak, Beto Kusyairy, Cristina Suzanne, Deanna Yusoff, Jalaluddin Hassan	Comedy / Drama	Ara Film	
J U N E	12	Suatu Malam Kubur Berasap 2	Ernie Chen	Ajak Shiro, Shahrol Shiro, Azad Jasmin, Rahim Sepahtu	Horror / Comedy	Outloud Studios	
J U N E	19	Pengantin Malam	Eyra Rahman	Nora Danish, Farid Kamil, Nina Iskandar	Horror	MIG Pictures	
J U N E	19	Goal	K. Guna	Uthaya, Irfan, THR Visha, Chinni Jayanth, Singamuthu, Nalini, Vaiyapuri, Nazira Ibrahim	Comedy / Romance / Sport / Drama	Malik Streams Corporations; Tamil-language film	
J U N E	26	Vivaagarathu	Revathy	Revathy, Hari Dhass, Aghonderan Sahadevan, Bala Ganapathi William	Drama	Viar Ventures; Tamil-language film	

=== July – September ===
Opening		Title	Director	Cast	Genre	Notes	Ref.
J U L Y	3	Curse of Spirits	M. Subash Abdullah	Desmond Chan, Amethyst Leong	Horror / Comedy	Genius Parade; Mandarin-, Cantonese-language film	
J U L Y	10	Hungry Ghost Ritual	Nick Cheung	Nick Cheung, Annie Liu, Carrie Ng, Cathryn Lee, Lam Wai	Horror / Family / Mystery	Asia Tropical Films Cantonese-language film	
J U L Y	28	Mat Tudung	Wan Mohd Hafiz Wan Hussein	Fizz Fairuz, Nelydia Senrose, Izzue Islam, Harun Salim Bachik, Rosnah Mat Aris	Comedy / Romance	Showbiz Productions	
J U L Y	28	Tembus	Ahmad Idham	Aaron Aziz, Luna Maya, Fazura, Khir Rahman, Eizlan Yusof, Mia Sara Nasuha	Thriller / Crime / Family	Excellent Pictures	
A U G U S T	7	Adnan Sempit Sawadikap	Ismail Bob Hasim	Shaheizy Sam, Intan Ladyana, Along Raja Lawak, Yana Samsudin	Comedy	MIG Pictures; Preceded by Adnan Sempit (2010), Adnan Sempit 2 (2012) and Adnan Sempit 3 (2013)	
A U G U S T	8	Maindhan	C. Kumaresan	C. Kumaresan, Shaila Nair, Punnagai Poo Gheetha, Rabbit Mac	Action / Drama / Comedy	Astro Shaw; Tamil-language film	
A U G U S T	14	Kawan Aku Mati Dalam Rumah Sewa	Hashim Rejab	Fad Bocey, Abam Bocey, Achey Bocey, Epy Raja Lawak, Yassin	Comedy / Horror	Mangkin Prestij	
A U G U S T	21	Jin	Pierre Andre	Zul Ariffin, Mon Ryanti, Harun Salim Bachik	Horror	3Line Media	
A U G U S T	28	Mamak Cupcake	Woo Ming Jin	Shaheizy Sam, Siti Saleha, Azad Jasmin, Faizal Ismail, Maria Farida, Natasha Hudson	Comedy / Drama / Family	Primeworks Studios / Grand Brilliance	
S E P T E M B E R	4	Ribbit	Mamat Khalid	Johan Raja Lawak, Awie, Izzue Islam, Elfira Loy, Aznil Nawawi, Sean Astin, Tim Curry, Russell Peters, Cherami Leigh	Adventure / Animation	KRU International English & Malay-language film	
S E P T E M B E R	4	The Gathering	Bingo Chang	Chen Zeyao, Guo Xiaodong, Zhou Zhou, Huang Zhongkun, Fang Jiwei, Zhuhao Ren, Chen Wei Quan, Hank Yip, Zheng Wei Yin	Drama / Family / Romance	Benison Picture; Mandarin-language film	
S E P T E M B E R	11	Lagenda Budak Setan 3: Kasyah	Sharad Sharan	Farid Kamil, Lisa Surihani, Maya Karin, Bront Palarae, Ayu Raudhah, Iqram Dinzly	Drama / Romance	Astro Shaw; Preceded by Lagenda Budak Setan (2010) and Lagenda Budak Setan II: Katerina (2012)	
S E P T E M B E R	11	Fantasia	Jason Kok	Yise Loo, Teddy Chin, Cathryn Lee, Koe Yeet, Billy Ng, Aenie Wong, Jeffrey Cheng, Dennis Lau	Comedy / Fantasy / Romance	Juita Entertainment; Mandarin-language film	
S E P T E M B E R	18	Nasi Tangas (Nasi Kangkang)	Hashim Rejab	Adibah Yunus, Azwan Kombos, Shima Anuar, Delimawati, Herman Tino, Along Eyzendy	Thriller / Horror	MIG Pictures	
S E P T E M B E R	25	Amir & Loqman Pergi ke Laut	Mamat Khalid	Syuk Balas, Shuib Sepahtu, Sofi Jikan, Zarina Anjoulie, Dewa Sapri, Nadia Mustafar, Rashidi Ishak	Action / Comedy	Astro Shaw	
S E P T E M B E R	25	Three Geniuses	P. K. Rhaj	Gautham, Ghani, Grace, K. Bhagyaraj, Shashi Tharan, Don Prasna, Aghonderan, Sangeetha Krishnasamy, Jasveer Kaur, Kavitha, Mithiran, Sugumaran, Kreepasree	Action / Comedy / Science fiction	On Track Animation; Tamil- and Malay-language film	

=== October – December ===
Opening		Title	Director	Cast	Genre	Notes	Ref.
O C T O B E R	2	Dollah Super Star	Kabir Bhatia	Awie, Sharnaaz Ahmad, Neelofa, Fizz Fairuz, Aziz M. Osman, Lan Pet Pet	Comedy / Action	Filmscape	
O C T O B E R	2	Glorifying Love	Lai Kim Koon	Emily Chan, Lawrence Wong, Adrian Tan, Josh Lai, Tommy Kuan	Romance	MIG Pictures; Mandarin-language film	
O C T O B E R	9	Kaithiyin Agarathi	Seenu	Aghonderan Sahadevan, Gantiban Ben	Action / Drama	Anjana Film Productions; Tamil-language film	
O C T O B E R	16	Seventh	Ryon Lee	Gino Chai, Mindee Ong, Teddy Chin, Kim Thian, Guan Zi Jun, George Ng, Ye Qing Fang, Pearlly Chua, Risa Chong, Mayjune, Ernest Chong	Thriller / Horror	SKT Studios; Mandarin-language film	
O C T O B E R	16	Mistik Syirik Tahyul	M. Subash Abdullah	Mak Jah, Sura Sojangi, Kalpana Sundraju, Naqia Nasution	Horror / Comedy / Drama	Genius Parade	
O C T O B E R	23	Dendam Orang Mati	Jason Chong	Lisa Surihani, Fizz Fairuz, Miera Leyana	Thriller / Horror	KRU Studios	
O C T O B E R	23	Phuyal 18	M. Subash Abdullah	M. Suurya, Prakash Gobal, Sivabaalan, Arivanath, Sivabalan, Sashi Teran ST, Bala Ganapathi William	Horror / Comedy / Drama / Action / Thriller	Genius Parade; Tamil-language film	
O C T O B E R	30	Anak Jantan	Faizal A. Rashid	Farid Kamil, Bront Palarae, Nora Danish, Rahim Razali	Action / Drama	Primeworks Studios	
O C T O B E R	30	The Cage	Felix Tan, Kethsvin Chee	Yeo Yann Yann, Henley Hii, William San, Coby Chong, Adrian Tan, Berg Lee, Wayne Chai, Ernest Zhang, Kyo Chong, Lim Mei Fen, Freddie Wong	Action / Adventure / Thriller / Horror / Crime / Mystery	Dreamteam Studio; Mandarin-language film	
N O V E M B E R	6	Kelibat	Hashim Rejab	Fadlan Hazim, Atikah Suhaimie, Niezam Zaidi, Ellie Suriaty, Fauzi Nawawi	Horror	MIG Pictures	
N O V E M B E R	13	MTB: Misi Tawan Baby	Adam Hamdi	Kamal Adli, Erin Malek, Cat Farish, Zulin Aziz, Fido Adhross, Zarina Zainoordin	Comedy / Romance	SPS Jaya	
N O V E M B E R	13	Victory	P. Rameesh	Sasitharan, Kavitha Thiagarajan, Ben G, Ghana, Adam Corrie, Zack Taipan, G. Yamini, Jamaliah Jamaludin, Shaharudin Jamaludin, Mohd Hatta Mahmud, Lee Wen Yuen, C. Maalani, G. Theeban, Gana Pragasam	Action / Sport / Drama	Rivala Production; Tamil-language film	
N O V E M B E R	20	Kaki Kitai	Azaromi Ghozali	Shaheizy Sam, Fezrul Khan, Farid Kamil, Emily Chan, Adam Corrie, Along Eyzendy	Action / Comedy	MIG Pictures	
N O V E M B E R	20	Behind the Scene	Bryan Gao	James Wong, Henry Thia, Wang Rou Lin, Chen Jun Jun	Horror	Just Work Entertainment; Mandarin-language film	
N O V E M B E R	27	Mana Mau Lari	Abdul Razak Mohaideen	Saiful Apek, Tauke Raja Lawak, Shuk Balas, Yassin, Ropie, Dira Abu Bakar	Adventure / Comedy	Tayangan Unggul	
N O V E M B E R	27	Lelaki Harapan Dunia	Liew Seng Tat	Wan Hanafi Su, Harun Salim Bachik, Sofi Jikan, Jalil Hamid, Azhan Rani	Comedy / Drama	Everythings Film	
D E C E M B E R	4	Rentap	Simon Long	Zahiril Adzim, Syafie Naswip, Elfira Loy	Action / Comedy / Drama	Double Vision	
D E C E M B E R	4	Gila Baby	Kabir Bhatia	Beto Kusyairy, Nadiya Nisaa, Fimie Don, Sharnaaz Ahmad, Adlin Aman Ramlie, Jalil Hamid, Lan Pet Pet	Action / Comedy / Romance	Primeworks Studios	
D E C E M B E R	11	3 Brothers	Silver Yee	Jack Lim, Alvin Chong, Jusztin, Jeff, Gan Mei Yan, Yumi Wong SK	Comedy	The Film Engine; Mandarin-, Cantonese-language film	
D E C E M B E R	11	Manisnya Cinta di Cappadocia	Bernard Chauly	Fazura, Shaheizy Sam, Faizal Hussein, Rafidah Abdullah, Lisa Surihani, Fauziah Ahmad Daud, Eja	Comedy / Romance / Drama / Family	Astro Shaw / Global Station / Red Films	
D E C E M B E R	18	Kasut Ku Kusut	Pierre Andre	Shaheizy Sam, Pablo Amirul, Atikah Suhaimie, Along Eyzendy	Comedy	MIG Pictures	
D E C E M B E R	18	Ophilia	Raja Mukhriz Raja Ahmad Kamaruddin	Pekin Ibrahim, Que Haidar, Kodi Rasheed	Action / Drama	SPS Jaya	
D E C E M B E R	25	Cerita Hantu Malaysia	Pierre Andre	Kamal Adli, Leez Rosli, Kamarul Yusoff, Wan Ellyas, Mikail Andre	Horror	3 Line Media	
D E C E M B E R	25	Terbaik dari Langit	Nik Amir Mustapha	Bront Palarae, Iedil Putra, Amerul Affendi, Megat Sharizal, Nadiya Nisaa, Sharifah Amani, Siti Saleha	Adventure / Comedy / Drama	Astro Shaw / Playground Production	
