= Zul Ariffin =

Malaysian actor, model (born 1986)

Haji Zul Ariffin
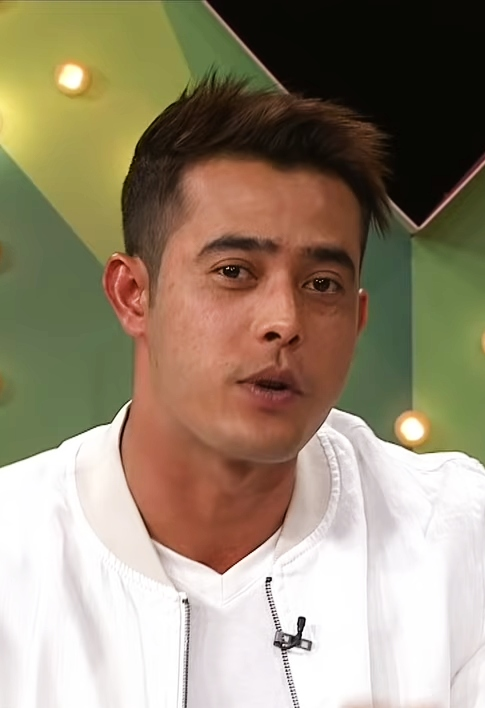
- Zul on TGV Cinemas 2025
- Born: Zulkifli bin Ariffin; 25 October 1986 (age 40); Taiping, Perak, Malaysia
- Education: Sijil Pelajaran Malaysia (SPM)
- Occupations: Actor and model
- Years active: 2008–present

Zulkifli bin Ariffin (born 25 October 1986), also known as Zul Ariffin, is a Malaysian actor, stuntman, and model. He began his acting career in 2008 with a supporting role in the drama series Awan Dania and later moved on to the lead role as Inspector Ashraf in RTM's longest-running police drama series, Gerak Khas until the drama was suspended in 2011. He made his film debut as ASP Zam in the film Evolusi KL Drift 2 in 2010.

His name first came to the public's attention through his collaboration with Ayda Jebat in Rindu Awak 200% which aired on Slot Akasia TV3. The success of this drama led to his second collaboration with Ayda through the drama M.A.I.D on Astro Ria. Through the 26th Malaysian Film Festival, he won the Male Hope Actor award for his performance in the film Penanggal.

== Early life ==
He was born on 25 October 1986 in Taiping, Perak and the youngest of four siblings to his parents, Ariffin Hassan and Robiah Nasir, he has two sisters and one brother and is of mixed Malay and Dutch blood. He aspired to become a member of the Royal Malaysian Navy (TLDM) but unfortunately he was not eligible due to a broken shoulder injury. He left his hometown in Taiping to find work in the capital Kuala Lumpur and was offered a job as a barista at a cafe called Dome Café in the capital, at the age of 18. He then took a modeling course and began participating in several fashion shows and commercials.

== Career ==
His talent was discovered by a talent scout and he began appearing in television commercials. He got his first acting role in 2008 through the drama Awan Dania starring Scha Al-Yahya. In 2009, he played the main role as Inspector Ashraf in the police action drama Gerak Khas produced by Yusof Haslam, however, his 'match' with Gerak Khas did not last long when the drama was temporarily suspended two years later. Zul stepped onto the big screen by starring in his first acting film, Evolusi KL Drift 2 directed by Syamsul Yusof where he played the role of ASP Zam, alongside Remy Ishak as Inspector Kamal. The film was released on 25 March 2010 and achieved box office success.

Zul actively starred in telefilms in the early 2010s, including playing the role of a boxer in "Anak Rintih", a street kid Chow Kit in "Mendongak Ke Langit" and a romantic comedy with singer Misha Omar in "Antara Dua" which somewhat highlighted his acting abilities. After Gerak Khas was "rested" with its last episode aired on 22 July 2011, he starred in the drama Nora Elena with Aaron Aziz and Siti Saleha which was aired on Slot Akasia TV3, he is said to have experienced a slump in 2012, when he reached overweight. At that time, he did not receive any job offers for a year and a half. In 2013, Zul acted in his only TV drama that year, Luluhnya Sebuah Ikrar with Sara Ali and Ryzal Jaafar.

Working under the direction of senior actor Ellie Suriati, Zul acted in his second film—a horror film titled Penanggal with Fasha Sandha and was followed by his third film, Bikers Kental with Awie, Zizan Razak and Bront Palarae which was released on 23 May 2013. He returned to acting and it turned out that his comeback was fruitful when he starred in Rindu Awak 200% with rising actress and singer, Ayda Jebat who plays the role of Armel Aisya and Zul plays the role of Zill Faezrul, this drama was broadcast on Slot Akasia TV3 from 15 July to 1 September 2014. Zul's profile as an actor was further strengthened when he won the FFM Hope Star|Best Male Hope Actor at the 26th Malaysian Film Festival for his outstanding performance in the film Penanggal, beating other actors including Karl Shafek Zaiton: Ceritaku, Shukri Yahaya (Ular) and Syazwan Zulkifly (Juvana).

In the same year, he played the role of Airil in the prime time television series Slot Akasia TV3, Istikharah Cinta with his heroine, Faye Kusairi who played the role of Dina Alia, then played the role of a mafia leader in the action film Balistik with its main actors, Rosyam Nor and Rita Rudaini. Working under the direction of Pierre Andre, he and Mon Ryanti starred in the horror film, Jin produced by Empat Samudera.

In 2015, he won the Meletop TV Actor category at the MeleTOP Era Awards 2015 for his performance in Rindu Awak 200%. He was paired again with Siti Saleha in the drama Uda & Dara which was adapted from the Uda & Dara novel by the late Usman Awang which premiered on Astro Ria from 24 February to 6 March 2016.

In 2017, his film, J Revolusi was released in cinemas on 2 March, he played the role of Jay Zulkarnain, a chief officer of the Special Action Unit (UTK). Zul reportedly bought a Ducati Hypermotard motorcycle to use in several action scenes in the film. He acted with Fathia Latiff in the drama Menanti Februari which was broadcast on TV3, telling the story of three close friends, namely Arie, Fiza and Edi, who together fall in love with Fiza.

Next, he starred in the drama adaptation of the novel, Titian Cinta which aired on Slot Akasia TV3. Zul appeared with Farid Kamil in the epic adventure film adaptation of the novel by Ramlee Awang Murshid, Tombiruo: Penunggu Rimba which was released on 12 October 2017.

He and Izara Aishah later played the main role in the drama Mr. London Ms. Langkawi on Astro Warna, playing the role of Aidid. His next film project is the comedy horror film Hantu Kak Limah directed by Mamat Khalid which was released on 9 August 2018. Zul along with singer and actress Elizabeth Tan starred in the horror thriller film, Misteri Dilaila directed by Syafiq Yusof which was released on 21 February 2019, he played the role of Jefri.

Zul returned as Inspector Ashraf in Gerak Khas after more than 8 years. He is one of the cast members of Gerak Khas season 19 including Mustaqim Bahadon and two of the original cast members, Farid Amirul and Abby Abadi. He played the role of mixed martial arts athlete Adam "The Ace" Abdullah in the sports action film Sangkar directed by Kabir Bhatia which paired him with Remy Ishak and Mira Filzah. Aired on 29 August 2019, it tells the story of the enmity and redemption between two local MMA fighters, as well as their struggle for honor and family. This is Zul and Remy's second collaboration in 9 years since Evolusi KL Drift 2.

Zul was paired with Mira again in the drama Bidadari Kiriman Tuhan which aired on Astro Ria, playing the role of Yusof, and then acted alongside Raysha Rizrose in the drama Ryan Aralyn on TV3, playing the role of Ryan. Apart from that, he will be starring in a biopic film produced by Rosyam Nor titled Juang which also stars Zizan Razak and Jack Lim.

He returned to work under the direction of Syafiq Yusof through the film Penunggang Agama playing the role of Amir. It reunited him with Azira Shafinaz who played the role of Anna. This was also the first pairing of Zul and Azira in 3 years since Seribu Rindu. After Penunggang Agama, he returned to play the role of Jay Zulkarnain in the film J2: J Retribusi, a sequel to the film J Revolusi. This film is screened exclusively on Disney+ Hotstar starting 1 June. Zul was paired with Uyaina Arshad in the drama Love Elsa which aired on Astro Ria, where she played the role of Ridza Kim. She also acted alongside Ruhainies in the drama WiFi Sebelah Rumah playing the role of Ghaz.

In September 2021, Zul announced that he had withdrawn from being nominated for the 34th Berita Harian Popular Star Awards. The announcement was made through a statement uploaded on Instagram. In 2022, he starred alongside Nelissa Nizam in the drama Tarik Aku Ke Syurga playing the role of Zamri, a successful real estate consultant.

In 2026, Zul starred in the action film Tarung: Unforgiven produced by Alpha47 Films, playing the role of Badrul.

== Filmography ==
=== Film ===
Year	Title	Role	Notes
2010	Evolusi KL Drift 2	ASP Zam	The first movie
2010	Lukisan Hati		Free movies
2013	Bikers Kental	Arby	
2013	Penanggal	Syed Ummar Al Attas	
2014	Balistik	Gangster Boss	
2014	Jin	Shafiq	
2016	Evolusi Persona	Interest	Short Film
2016	#ER3 Ertiga	Interest	Short Film
2017	J Revolusi	Jay Zulkarnain	
2017	Tombiruo: Penunggu Rimba	Tombiruo/Ejim	
2018	Hantu Kak Limah	Ustaz Solihin	
2019	Misteri Dilaila	Jefri	
2019	Sangkar	Adam "The Ace" Abdullah	
2021	Penunggang Agama	Amir	
2021	J2: J Retribusi	Jay Zulkarnain	
2021	Penunggang Agama 2	Amir	
2022	Juang	Dr. John	
2022	Talbis Iblis	Nasir	
2024	Sheriff: Narko Integriti	DSP Sheriff / Sheriffuddin Hussein	
2024	Don Dukun	Don Arif	
2025	Magik Rompak	Fariq	
2025	Malam Terlarang	Omar Haji Mokhtar	
2025	Banduan	Azharuddin	Special appearance
2026	Goat	Archie (voice)	Replaced David Harbour voice for the Malaysian broadcast
2026	Tarung: Unforgiven	Badrul	
2026	The Furious: Pertaruhan Maruah	Firdaus	
TBA	Wantugo	Khalif	Post-production

=== Television series ===
Year	Title	Role	TV Channel	Notes
2008	Awan Dania (Season 1)		Astro Ria	First drama, supporting actor
2009	Yusuff	Jamal	TV3	
2009	Segalanya Ku Terima	Daniel	TV3	
2009–2011 2019–2020	Gerak Khas	Inspektor Ashraf	TV2	
2010	Mayang Mengurai	Dr. Roslee	TV3	
2010	Tudung Ekspres	Syahrul Izhar	Astro Prima	
2010	Tiramisu	Zain	TV3	
2011	Moreh		Astro Oasis	
2011	Nora Elena	Saiful Idham / Eid	TV3	
2011	Hilang	Azrul	TV9	
2011	Laila Manja	Imran	TV3	
2011–2012	Karma	Aduka	TV9	
2012	Cikgu Kemisah Kirby (Season 1)	Asmadi	TV2	
2012	Anak Raja Dongeng			
2012	Lagenda Langkawi	Amin	TV2	
2012–2013	Terlanjur Cinta	Izam	TV9	
2013	Debunga Lalang	Halim	TV3	
2013	Cikgu Kemisah Kirby (Season 2)	Asmadi	TV2	
2013	Luluhnya Sebuah Ikra	Azhar	TV9	
2013	Jodoh Itu Milik Kita	Redza	Astro Mustika HD	
2013	Sangkar	Tuan Syed	TV9	
2013	Janji Adam	Adam	TV3	
2013	Firdausi Cinta		TV1	
2014	Walau Sedetik Cuma	Azhan	TV AlHijrah	
2014	Rindu Awak 200%	Zill Faezrul	TV3	
2014–2015	Istikharah Cinta	Airil	TV3	
2015	M.A.I.D	Harris	Astro Ria	
2016	Uda &amp; Dara	Izzat Hilman	Astro Prima	
2017	Menanti Februari	Arie	TV3	
2017	Titian Cinta	Umayr Harris	TV3	
2018	Mr. London, Ms. Langkawi	Aidid	Astro Warna	
2018	Ti Amo, Sweetheart 100 Hari	Iskandar	Astro Ria	
2018	Seribu Rindu	Irfan	TV3	
2019	After I Own	Adriz	TV3	
2020	Bidadari Kiriman Tuhan	Cikgu Yusof	Astro Ria	
2020	Ryan Aralyn	Ryan	TV3	
2021	Diva Popular		Awesome TV	
2021	Love Elsa	Ridza Kim	Astro Ria	
2021	Budak Intern	Dato Shuk	TV9	
2022	Tarik Aku Ke Syurga	Zamri	TV3	
2025	First Wives: Sisters Before Misters	Chief Inspector Zulkifli	Astro Citra	

=== Web ===
Year	Title	Role	App	Notes
2015	Cinta Karan	Zul	Tonton	First drama
2021	Wifi Sebelah Rumah	Ghaz	Disney+ Hotstar	
2023	Perempuan Itu	Emir	Tonton	
2024	Kayangan	Habil	Prime Video	

=== Telemovie ===
Year	Title	Role	TV Channel	Notes
2010	Anak Rintih	Roni Ahmad	Astro Prima	First telemovie
2011	7 Songs	Raizal	Astro Citra	
2011	Mendongak Ke Langit	Zikri/Aliff	Astro Ria	
2011	Antara Dua	Azri	TV2	
2011	Hatiku Di Kinabalu	Anuar	Astro Citra	
2011	Sayang Abah	Along	Astro Prima	
2012	Cik Paris Diva Kampung	Rahim	Astro Prima	
2012	Jujur Aku Dayus	Azhan	TV3	
2013	Mr. Feminin	Fahmi	TV9	
2013	Kabin Di Tepi Tasik	Rushid	Astro Ria	
2013	Mimpi Fara	Farid	TV9	
2013	Kasih Bersulam Daun Palas	Fazli bin Mansor	Astro Prima	
2014	Panik	Rashid	Astro First Exclusive	
2014	Kemaafan Terindah	Aliff Firdaus	TV1	
2014	Hati Untuk Siapa	Zul	Astro Prima	
2014	Habibah vs Baby	Badrul	TV9	
2014	Aira Airil	Abdullah	TV1	
2015	Rindu Awak 200% Raya	Zill Faezrul	TV3	
2015	Lokum Untuk Mama	Shahrul	TV9	
2015	Lilinkah Aku	Iskandar	TV9	
2016	M.A.I.D Pun Nak Raya	Harris	Astro Ria	
2016	Lara Hadi	Hadi	TV2	
2017	Permata Hati	Aizuddin	Astro First Exclusive	
2019	Sempurnakah Aku	Johan	Astro Ria	
2022	Mandi Mayat	Syawal	Astro Citra	

=== Television ===
Year	Title	Role	TV Channel
2022	Pencuri Hati	Host	Sooka
2022–2023	The Masked Singer Malaysia (season 3)	Judge	Astro Warna
