= SeeFood =

- Official poster
- Directed by: Goh Aun Hoe
- Written by: Jeffrey Chiang
- Produced by: Gene Lim Bee Thin
- Starring: Gavin Yap; Diong Chae Lian; Christina Orow; Kennie Dowle
- Music by: Tan Yan Wei; Imaginex Studios
- Production companies: Silver Ant; Al Jazeera Children's Channel
- Release date: 7 October 2011
- Running time: 90 minutes
- Countries: Malaysia; Qatar
- Language: English
- Budget: RM 12 million (US$ 4 million)
- Box office: RM 2.36 million ($729,634)

SeeFood (also known as Sea Level in the United States) is a 2011 Malaysian-Qatari animated adventure comedy film produced by Silver Ant and released in Malaysian cinemas on 8 March 2012. The story follows the horde of fishes from the sea to get their rescue.

SeeFood first launched in Poland on 7 October 2011. It received financial support from Malaysian Ministry of Science, Technology and Innovation and from the Multimedia Development Corporation.

The film is also available in original and dubbed-in-Malay versions.

== Plot ==
In the ocean deeps, an Oceanic whitetip shark named Julius and his friend Pup the brownbanded bamboo shark play around the ocean bed, when two human divers steal several shark eggs (Pup's siblings) from the reef, despite Pup's efforts to prevent it. To light up the Pup, Julius takes him to his sunken ship for dinner, but Pup is too upset to eat anything. Pup meets his friend Octo the octopus inventor, who takes Pup to show off his invention: an underwater car, and take it out for a test drive.

Meanwhile, a factory, who is polluting the ocean prompts a hostile moray eel named Murray to invade the ocean bed with his army of spider crabs. The stingray Spin finds a discarded restaurant menu and takes it to Julius's three pilot fish butlers. The menu shows a variety of chicken meals, which are only found on land.

Spin and Myrtle the sea turtle lead Julius to a beach, where he is almost stranded, while trying to eat a hen named Heather, but makes it back into the sea. On his next hunt for fish, Julius is caught by a large fish hook and is reeled up on to a boat. He is almost finned alive by a group of fishermen, but escapes when a large wave hits the boat.

Pup sights his unhatched siblings on a wharf being moved into a fishmonger's shed, but Myrtle and Octo refuse to assist him in the dangerous task of rescuing them. Pup overhears them talking about his ability to breathe on land, then goes back to the wharf. Myrtle and Julius found out that from interrogating Spin that Pup is endangering himself, then they persuade Octo to help rescue Pup. Meanwhile, Pup has found the shark eggs in a fish shed, but has to hide from the fishmonger.

Octo constructs using submarine wreckages a robotic suit to allow Julius and his pilot fish take maneuver on land and uses a rocket to launch the suit on to the shore. However, Octo is not concerned that the suit may fall apart as an opportunity to be rid of Julius. The suit crashes into a chicken farm, where they are soon caught by the roosters and taken to the fish shed, where the fishmonger keeps them captive.

The shark eggs begin to hatch and Pup is able to get them out of the shed just as the divers who caught them return. Myrtle helps Pup the rest of the way. Hearing from his friends that Julius is in trouble, Pup sets off to rescue him, helped by a coconut crab and the roosters, who relented.

As Myrtle and Octo get the shark eggs and two newly hatched sharks to safety, the deep sea dwellers march on. Octo and Myrtle fight off the invaders, helped by Spin (who had collaborated with them previously). Realising that the factory pollution had prompted Murray to attack the ocean bed, Octo procures some old sea mines from his submarine. His friends help him carry the mines to block up the factory pipes depositing the pollution.

Pup, the roosters and the coconut crab, release Julius and his pilot fish. After a brief fight against the fishmonger and his two divers, the shed catches fire. The three humans pursue the escaping animals by dune buggy and motorcycles. As the chase ensues, the roosters get the two divers out of the way.

At the beach, the fishmonger momentarily catches Pup, but Julius rescues him and the fishmonger drives off the edge of a pier, his buggy crashing right into the sea mines and blowing up the factory. The fishmonger and his divers are then arrested by the police for the caused damage.

Julius gets out of the suit, returns to the reef and drives away the invading deep sea dwellers. Totally out of danger, Pup and his friends raise the newly hatched sharks, while the roosters play around with Octo's suit until it malfunctions and speeds into the ocean.

== Voice cast ==
- Gavin Yap as Julius, a Oceanic whitetip shark
- Diong Chae Lian as Pup, a young brownbanded bamboo shark
- Christina Orow as Myrtle, an elderly green sea turtle
- Kennie Dowle as Octo, a mad scientist blue-ringed octopus
- Jason Daud Cottom as Larry, a pilot fish who is one of Julius's butlers
- Andrew Susay as Moe, a pilot fish who is another of Julius's butlers
- Brian Zimmerman as Curly, a pilot fish, also another of Julius's butlers
- Colin Chong as Lee, a rooster
- Adila Shahir as Heather, a hen
- Tikriti Shabudin as Spoch, a rooster
- Rob Middleton as Herc, a rooster
- Chi-Ren Choong as fishmonger
- Steven Tan as Lanky
- Maxwell Andrew as Pudgy
- Mike Swift as Murray, an evil moray eel who lives in the deep sea
- Jay Sheldon as Spin, a southern stingray
- Ramona Rahman as Mrs. Chong
- Amelia Henderson as Ruby
- Ralph Guggeria as TV Announcer
- Toby Keith II as Seahorse

== Production ==
SeeFood was jointly produced by Silver Ant Sdn Bhd, the Petaling Jaya-based independent studio Silver Ant, and the children brand of the Al Jazeera channel (or JCC for short), with a grant from the Science, Technology and Innovation Ministry and also support from the Multimedia Development Corporation (MDeC).

Silver Ant had previously collaborated with MDeC, having been hired in 2005 to produce the trailer for Saladin: The Animated Series. The JCC producers, impressed by the trailer, decided to co-produce SeeFood.

Like the Pixar team behind Finding Nemo, SeeFood's animation team of 40 people put in much effort into studying the behaviour of the creatures that form the cast of SeeFood to be sure that they are portrayed in a realistic manner besides projecting a human expression that would bring them to life. The animation process took the team about two years.

== Reception ==
The film received a mixed reception. Renee Schonfeld of Common Sense Media rated it with 1 star out of 5, citing it as a "weak, poorly-plotted animated tale with scares, few laughs" and its environmental message "as random and murky as the story itself".

== Film score and soundtrack ==
SeeFood (Original Soundtrack)

Soundtrack album by various artists
- Released: 7 October 2011
- Recorded: 2011
- Genres: Film soundtrack, pop, rock
- Length: 27:33
- Label: Königskinder Music
- Producer: Tan Yan Wei

The film score was composed by Tan Yan Wei of Imaginex Studios. The film's soundtrack was released in October 2011, several months after Tan died in April while making the soundtracks of this film and Bunohan. The film scoring task was later taken over by Imaginex Studios.

=== Track listing ===
No.	Title	Length
1.	"Ocean Paradise"	0:56
2.	"Final Battle"	5:22
3.	"What's A Ride"	2:07
4.	"Fish March"	2:44
Total length:		27:33

== Box office ==
Country	Gross (US$)	Release date
Poland	1,237,232	7 October 2011
Russia	2,219,684	20 October 2011
Czech Republic	116,787	17 November 2011
Iceland	25,909	30 December 2011
Malaysia	751,650	8 March 2012
Croatia	26,840	15 March 2012
Slovakia	TBA	18 June 2015

== Awards ==
Kre8tif! Award

Year	Category	Award	Result
2010	Animation/VFX Category	Best Animation Director	Won
2010	Animation/VFX Category	Best Production	Won
2010	Animation/VFX Category	Best Editor	Won
2010	Animation/VFX Category	Best Audio Production	Won
2010	Animation/VFX Category	Best Commissioned Work	Won

Anugerah Karyawan Animasi (Malaysia)

Year	Award	Result
2011	Animator 3D Terbaik; Best 3D animation	Won
2011	Kompositor/VFX Animasi Terbaik; Best animation composite/visual effects	Won
2011	Montaj Animasi Terbaik; Best animation montage	Won
2011	Animasi Terbaik; Best animation	Won
