= Banduan (film) =

- Theatrical release poster
- Directed by: Kroll Azry
- Written by: Kroll Azry; Nazri Vovinski
- Produced by: Kalyana Devan; Kathiravan R
- Starring: Aaron Aziz; Rosyam Nor; Afdlin Shauki; Fadhli Masoot; Abi Madyan
- Cinematography: Vikee Thiagarajan
- Edited by: Aral R Thangam; Anand Raghavan
- Music by: Sam CS; Litia Ramachandran
- Production companies: Number Twenty One Media; Dream Warrior Pictures
- Distributed by: Astro Shaw
- Release date: November 6, 2025 (Malaysia)
- Country: Malaysia
- Language: Malay
- Budget: RM 7 million

Banduan (transl. Prisoner) is a 2025 Malaysian action thriller film directed by Kroll Azry, serving as an official remake of the 2019 Indian Tamil-language film Kaithi. The film stars Aaron Aziz in the lead role, alongside Rosyam Nor and Afdlin Shauki. It was released on November 6, 2025.

== Plot ==
Dali, an ex-convict longing to meet his daughter for the first time. But when a drug raid shatters his chance at redemption, he is thrown into a deadly night of chaos, forcing him to fight for survival—and a second chance at fatherhood.

== Cast ==
- Aaron Aziz as Dali
- Rosyam Nor as Inspector Johari
- Afdlin Shauki as Sergeant Yahya
- Fadhli Masoot as Koboi
- Abi Madyan as Rajab
- Adlin Aman Ramlie
- Amir Nafis as Farid
- Daniel
- Hushairy Hussein
- Hawra Jamalullail as Hana, Dali's daughter
- Meynillen Thamil Selvan as Naga/Malik
- Joshua Michael
- Shashi Tharan as Doctor Selvam
- Sasidaran as Sergeant Devan
- Adam Shahz as Corporal Khairul
- Zul Ariffin as Azharuddin, Rejab's brother

== Production ==
Banduan is a co-production between Malaysia's Number Twenty One Media Sdn Bhd and Dream Warrior Pictures Sdn Bhd, a Malaysian subsidiary of India's Dream Warrior Pictures. It marks the first official Indian Tamil film industry remake in Malaysia.

According to the producers, the film retains the essence and core themes of the original Kaithi—such as redemption, fatherhood, and survival.

== Release and reception ==
The film is distributed by Astro Shaw and premiered in Malaysian cinemas on November 6, 2025.
