= Budak Kelantan =

- Directed by: Wan Azli Wan Jusoh
- Written by: Wan Azli Wan Jusoh
- Produced by: Ahmad Puad Onah
- Starring: Danny X-Factor; Bienda; Mohd Asrulfaizal Kamaruzaman; Md Eyzendy Md Aziz; Hushairi Husain; Wan Md Zuhari Wan Harun; Muhammad Haqqam Hakiri
- Distributed by: Primeworks Studios Sdn. Bhd
- Release date: 30 October 2008
- Country: Malaysia
- Languages: Malay; Kelantan Malay
- Budget: MYR 600,000 ($185,844)
- Box office: MYR 852,000 ($263,899)

Budak Kelantan (English: Kelantan Boy) is a 2008 Malaysian Malay-language drama film that captures the cultural relativism of Malaysians on Kelantanese migrant since urbanization of Kuala Lumpur. The main theme is a dramatization of a group of Kelantanese adults in their early 20s whom relocated to Kuala Lumpur, sets in 1990s, between the life of 2 long-lost friends from rural areas of Kelantan whom now are living in Kuala Lumpur and currently stand in difference social status. Some of the movie scenes were filmed strategically in one of many popular hangouts spot in Kuala Lumpur for both local and foreigners in 1990s, which are Central Market, Kotaraya Complex, Pertama Complex and defunct Klang Bus Stands which are now less favored beginning the year of 2000 after a successful crowd-puller establishment of many newly opened shopping malls and tourist destination which mainly concentrated in other part of Kuala Lumpur including Bukit Bintang, Bangsar and Jalan Ampang. As Kelantan is the only longest ruling Muslim conservative state in Malaysia by Malaysian Islamic political party PAS, the film direction is considered 'brave' as it is so far the only local film that touches most notable taboo subjects regarding runaway teenage girls, gang-rape, procuring, substance abuse and religious infidelity, stereotypically portrayed as committed by Kelantanese adults. Despite the provoked film background from local Malaysian perspective, it offers a variety of morally complex, gripping and unsettling, flawless domestic portrait that its director aims to leave the questions and dilemmas for viewers with open-ended, according to his interview.

The film's subplot also portrays similar gangsterism issues among majority of young Kelantanese adolescents men in Kuala Lumpur in 1990s, but narrated from different perspective with its sole attempt is to determine issues related to socioeconomic that is contributing towards rural to urban migration and its consequences to behavioral and emotional issues among migrant adolescents. The two main character, Buchek and Jaha, the former being protagonist and the latter being antagonist, besides their main roles as the movie plot thickens, use both active and narrative monologue in alternate since the beginning of the movie to further refined the storytelling direction.

Mixed views were given by some of local blogs and local entertainment portal, especially the exaggerated rape scene but the film was highly praised by internationally claimed local film director, the late Yasmin Ahmad on her blog with quotes "Suffice to say that we left Mid-Valley feeling very happy and hopeful about the future of Malaysian cinema." 'A film that explores truthfulness' and 'realism plight', as commented by Fadli Al-Akiti, local film critics blogger, TontonFilem and author of a book with same title. The ending part however left some critics questioned one of the subplot that leads directly to it thus weakened the strong existing plot of the entire movies.

The film also received critical response regarding its violence and graphic language with attempts to brings realism and neo-noir. Despite its unique approach for its relevance to the dark side of Malaysia, most local bloggers from Malaysian agrees that the film may be considered as an important cultural icon, inspiring, and regards it as one of the few Malaysian films that have different concepts of realism, gangsterism, drama and interesting narrative story, which differs from most Malaysian films before the release date of this movie.

The film joins a few of other Malaysian films that gets applauded including Jogho (1997), Wayang (2008) and internationally acclaimed Bunohan (2011) which use full-length Kelantanese dialect.

== Plot ==
2 guys named Buchek and Jaha, met in Central Market, Kuala Lumpur after had never seen each other for the last 13 years. Buchek, who had just graduated from Universiti Malaya, working with his other friends in burger stall while waiting to get a decent job. Jaha, who had been studying in Henry Gurney Prisoners School at Melaka has been living in Kuala Lumpur for many years. In the earlier scene of this movies, Jaha is seen to encounter a guy who tries to rape a girl in the dark corner of the street.

Jaha who rides a motorcycle with his friend, quickly stopped and beat that guy with the help of his friends. After a short conversation with the girl, Jaha offers to send the girl to his home, telling her that she will be alright as he found out that the girl is actually running from his home. After arriving home, he offered the girl to stay in comfort of his room because the fact that the house is actually lived by other male housemates. Jaha has started to smooth talk with the girl and manage to know that the girl has committed adultery with his boyfriend. Jaha who is actually a pimp, tries to rape the girl and after being resisted, he instructed his friends outside the room to get in a gang rape with the girl. His friends, who helped Jaha to rape the girl, feel pity for her and denied to take turns and leave Jaha alone.

=== The day of Jaha meeting Buchek ===
After a night in Jaha's house, the girl is being offered by Jaha to be his boyfriend and he promised to look her for a job. The girl who at first urged Jaha to send him to her sister's house in Shah Alam by taking bus at Klang Bus Stand, finally accept his offered. The girl eventually taken to a ride by a car by Jaha's friend, who is actually the person that Jaha sells the girl as a prostitute, based on the phone conversation while waiting for the car to arrive.

After walking to Central Market, Jaha find Buchek, who can not recognised Jaha at first. Buchek who was waiting for his friend, goes for a drink with Jaha and exchanging stories about each other's after having not met for a long time. Jaha invites Buchek to come to his house. Buchek who have to leave with his friends, accept Jaha offers and follow him while his friend going back alone. On his way walking nearby Kotaraya Complex to Pertama Complex to wait for Jaha's friends to come to pick them up, Jaha tell Buchek about his life in about how he always flirting around girls here. Suddenly, after looking at Jaha flirt with a girl who walking by and asking for her phone number, Buchek quickly stopped and seeing a flashback of how Jaha doing that with many other girls. Jaha who noticed that Buchek was standing like seeing a ghost, quickly move back and asking Jaha to walk with him.

After arrived in Pertama Complex, while both guy sits and having conversation, Buchek noticed that two men are looking suspiciously and keep watching them from far. Buchek who noticed that, ask Jaha is he rules this place, like having a power in his turf. Jaha answered and tells Buchek if he ever come here and being ignored by Jaha next time, it means that he has some rival looking for him and he does not want Buchek to get beat if Jaha seeing talking to Buchek cause the rival will eventually thinks that Buchek is Jaha's friends. After coming inside Pertama Complex for some sightseeing, 2 guys were coming after them and by the time Jaha and Buchek wants to run, the other 2 guy who has already followed them from the outside of the place started to beat them in the back.

Going Back To Jaha's Place, Jaha and Buchek was riding in car with Jaha's friends, Libokbong and after a while, Buchek was asking permission from Jaha to stop in the nearest mosque to pray. Libokbong, who resisted to stop, was scolded by Jaha and forced Libokbong to stop the car after seeing a mosque besides the road. Libokbong laughed at Jaha's attitude to let his friend to go for a pray. Jaha answered back by saying that his believed that even though how bad are we were, we must never stopped people to do a good things like praying.

Before going to Jaha's home, Libokbong mentioned to Jaha about going to his friends house to buy some drugs. Buchek was offered an excessive amount of cough syrup added with Coke by Jaha, but refused as he never took drugs in a whole of his life but finally accepted it after Jaha says he will not drink it if Buchek is not. After that, Buchek asked permission to go a prayer as it was nearly prayer time. Soon, they went back to Jaha's home.

=== Kidnapping girl ===
In the early morning, Jaha and Libokbong take Buchek for a ride and tell him it is just for sightseeing. Jaha then saw a Chinese girl was jogging beside the road. Jaha told Libokbong to move a bit faster and by the time the car was approaching the girl, Jaha commanded to stop the car and got out quickly to grab the girl into the car. Buchek, who did not know about this, helped Jaha to take the girl inside the car while grabbing her and keeping her mouth shuts. Libokbong quickly speed up the car but unfortunately along the freeway he noticed that the gas was running out. Jaha instantly told Libokbong to pull over not far from the gas station and buy the petrol using an empty container. While Jaha was holding the girl with Buchek, Jaha told Buchek to hang over as he need to go to the restroom. After seeing that Jaha has gone, Buchek immediately told the girl to run before his friends coming back. He gave the Chinese girl a money for a cab fare and the Chinese girl asked him a phone number if she can meet him again to pay back the money. Buchek who was freak out of what he is doing, quickly writes his phone number. The Chinese girl, Lee Chen Chen, safely rides a cab after being stopped by Buchek in the middle of the freeway. Jaha and Buchek who was coming back after a few minutes later were shocked after Buchek told them that he had to let the girl go because he did not want to have anything involve in this kidnapping. Soon after riding back to the road, Jaha who was so pissed for Buchek's act, asked Libokbong to stop the car and told Buchek to get out.

=== Meeting with Che Noor ===
Jaha was seen walking in Central Markets after getting his motorcycles out of workshop, a few days after his housemate got into accidents with it. He saw a girl walking toward Central Markets front door and trying to flirt with her. He surprised that the girl was meeting with Buchek, who is his friends, named Che Noor. Buchek, who seems guilty for his act of that day, invites Jaha to have a drink with him and Che Noor. After that meeting, Jaha keeps asking forgiveness to Buchek for taking him into his lifestyle and tells Buchek what a lucky man for him to have such nice and beautiful girlfriend.

Jaha was seen writing a letter, telling Jaha about why actually turned into a bad guy living in this big cities and because he feels that he is more good in telling about him in writing. Buchek, who noticed that Jaha had a feeling with his girlfriend after they three meet together, tried to find a way to match his girlfriend with Jaha, hoping that his best friend can possibly become better person by finding love with a girl that he may be in love. Buchek try to bring Jaha and Che Noor in another meet up, but ended up by Che Noor walking back home after knowing that Buchek was leaving to some place after the three meet at Central Market again.

While watching television, Buchek received a call from the Chen that she helped to run away from being kidnapped by Jaha and Libokbong. Chen asked to meet him. Buchek went and the girl told him that she was thankful for what Buchek did and feels that she was like a princess who was being rescued by a charming prince like a fairy tale story. Buchek feels accepted for Chen's honest friendship and he feels that he must do something to get Jaha together with Che Noor, who Buchek can not accept her love unlike Che Noor who has long admired him.

=== Killing an innocent ===
Jaha, who felt frustrated, could not help himself from forgetting about Che Noor. Until one night, while having a drink with his friends, he noticed that some people kept looking at him and his friends on the other table. Jaha who felt disturbed, eyeballed those guys and suddenly stood up and shouted at them. After one guy replies in an impolite way, Jaha quickly confronts the guy and keep beating him. The guy ran away and was chased by Jaha and his friends. Jaha was seen grasping a knife from a nearby fruit stall and stabbed the guy after he managed to reach him. After seeing the guy was about to die, Libokbong told him to run and they all kept running.

=== The death of Jaha ===
Buchek, who believes that love might change his best friend Jaha, keep trying to make Che Noor get together with Jaha and come up with an idea to ask them to watch a Dikir Barat show. While failing to call Jaha when he was about to go to the show, Jaha was actually running from the police who rushed to his neighbourhood to catch him after he was told by Libokbong who gets the alert about the police from his friends. Jaha unfortunately got into accident and dies.

Buchek received a call from Libokbong and was shocked with the news. He quickly told Che Noor how much Jaha was trying to change his life and be with her that he ended up dying looking for a love that he thought he can finally get.

Libokbong met Buchek and gave him a letter which he found inside Jaha's pocket, the same pants that he had worn when he died. Libokbong thought that this letter might be written to Buchek. While reading the letter, Chen was seen smiling at Buchek near him.

== Cast ==
| Actor | Role |
|---|---|
| Danny X-Factor | Buchek |
| Mohd Asrulfaizal Kamaruzaman | Jaha |
| Md Eyzendy Md Aziz | Libokbong |
| Bienda | Che Noor |
| Hushairi Husain | Wak Junuh |
| Wan Md Zuhari Wan Harun | Peija |
| Muhammad Haqqam Hakiri | Meighei Cikgu |

== Reception ==
The film received a good reception, even with a relatively lower budget than most Malaysian movies, (RM600,000) the film manages to draw a profit and has made over RM852,000 gross in Malaysia despite less promotion in mass media and being the first film directed by young director Wan Azli Wan Jusoh. In the beginning, it was just an experiment by Alternate Studio, a child company under major film distributor Grand Brilliance from Malaysia which aims to have more different genres of film in local industry.

The Shout! Awards, one of the entertainment awards which was held on 17 July 2009 and was aired in 8TV to recognise the Malaysian entertainment scene has nominated Budak Kelantan for the Breakthrough Film Award.

The movie was also among few of Malaysian movies that portrays multi-racial connections, with Buchek helping Lee Chen Chen, a Chinese girl who almost got kidnapped by Jaha, Buchek's best friend but finally ended up as Buchek's girlfriend over his current Malay female girlfriend. Although it was considered a small plot that did not help much of strength, it was a few attempts by Malaysian film producers to live the spirit of 1Malaysia, by making more racial integration harmony in Malaysian films.

Apart from that, Budak Kelantan is also among other Malaysian movies that continues the usage of full local dialects of Malaysia (Kelantanese) just like Anak Mami The Movie, Mami Jarum, Mami Jarum Junior, Anak Mami Kembali, Nana Tanjung & Nana Tanjung 2, which all were using dialects from Penang.

== Cultural influence ==
Kelantanese

The Kelantanese are mentioned as people who usually stick within their own group of people, a close brotherhood wherever a meetup anywhere even outside Malaysia and a person who sees no fear of response to any challenge or confrontation. Even though it was never any fact evidence that Kelantanese has the most cases of involving in crime, it is based on there being more Kelantanese or people who has linked with Kelantan either from their parent or ancestors who has the most numbers of people from the single states in Malaysia that lives in every states outside Kelantan ever since many decades ago, that could be the reason why it seems that more crime cases commit by Kelantanese reported by media in every state. Currently, the crime was very less reported to commit by a 'state' gang in Kuala Lumpur especially extortion or gang fight after a years of effort and tremendous development of Kuala Lumpur City Hall to improve the quality and security of Kuala Lumpur except for small cases of snatches or pickpockets. Perhaps, the film remains one of the important historical study on Malaysia, which picks Kelantanese as one of many example in regards of issues between urbanization and on characteristics (socio-economic) of adolescents migrant in Kuala Lumpur, and a zeitgeist film theme, as closely portrayed by another Malay film, Kami (2008)

Dikir Barat

A notable musical form that is synonymous with Kelantanese and bordering states of Southern Thailand, Dikir Barat was used as the opening theme songs of the movie. The ending of the film also marked by a scene at Dikir Barat concert in local university.

Americanization

The film pokes fun at prevalent influence of American culture and business on countries outside United States of America. The antagonist, Jaha, was mocked by his fellow Kelantanese friends as 'American Gangster' for his fashion-sense that favors only original American brand (shirts – Nike, secondhand pants - Levis, cigarette - Marlboro, drinks - Coca-Cola, TV channel – MTV)

== See also ==
- List of crime films:2000s
