= Suatu Ketika =

2019 Malaysian sports football film

- Directed by: Prakash Murugiah
- Written by: Prakash Murugiah; Nadia Azlan; Adi Bear; Mynn Lee
- Based on: Real Story
- Starring: Namron; Pekin Ibrahim
- Cinematography: Nurhanisham Muhammad
- Edited by: Adilan Azemi; Johan Bahar; Loaeswaran Mahalinggam
- Music by: Daniel Veerapen
- Distributed by: GSC Movies
- Release dates: September 12, 2019 (Malaysia); September 26, 2019 (Brunei)
- Running time: 94 minutes
- Country: Malaysia
- Language: Malay

Suatu Ketika (English: Once Upon) is a 2019 Malaysian Malay-language sport drama film directed by Prakash Murugiah based on the adaptation of real-life stories, Suatu Ketika highlights the important message of unity in Malaysia. Set in the year 1952, the film tells about the journey of a group of young village boys aspiring to win a local football match against an elite British team. It sees 12 schoolboys coming together despite their differences to play football.

The scriptwriting process for the film began in 2011. It took Suatu Ketika almost a decade (8 years to be exact!) to be made. Although the plot is fictional, the other aspects are based on people whom the director, producer and scriptwriter, Prakash Murugiah and executive producer, Prabakar Murugiah have known and interviewed over the last few years.

The 1-hour 33-minutes movie aims to promote a sense of unity among Malaysians. It shows life in the 1950s, the hopes and dreams of its people, and their spirit of togetherness. Other than highlighting the love of football, Suatu Ketika is also a tale about friendship, perseverance, courage and the spirit of going after your dreams.

Featuring Malaysia's top actors like Nam Ron and Pekin Ibrahim, Suatu Ketika also stars mainly 12-year-old schoolboys as the lead roles, has been released at all GSC theatres nationwide on September 12.

The film received a positive review. The film, which is a production of Kash Pictures Sdn Bhd with the support of GSC Movies. It is released on 12 September 2019 in Malaysia.

== Synopsis ==
Set in 1952 before independence at Ujong Pasir, Malacca, it tells the story about a team of 12-year-old local kampung school boys from different backgrounds who go against odds to form a soccer team, in order to compete in the local teen JG Davidson cup tournament. While these boys lack training, uniform and even a proper football, but they have spirit and determination. With help from their teacher and school gardener as coach, now they have to play against the reigning champion, a team of well-equipped British schoolboys from the British school St. James. Can they win?

== Cast ==
- Namron as Pak Sa'ad
- Pekin Ibrahim as Teacher Sulaiman
- Armand, as Usop
- Danial Akmal Fariz, as Syukri
- Farez Iqmal, as Atan
- Kuhan Divagaran, as Guna
- Dheva Naish, as Suresh
- Daniel Syahidan, as Husin
- Putera Syazwan, as Bakri
- Lim Xuan, as Lee Meng
- Azlan Raihan, as Dol
- Danial Iman, as Tuah
- Ahmas, as Panjang
- Adeq Jiey, as Kudin
- Farah Ahmad as Latipah
- Syafnida Shuhaimi as Teacher Rokiah
- Dintamam as Selamat
- Toby Keen, as Roger

== Production ==
The film budget costs around RM3.6 million. The film cast it diverse young actors and actresses aged between 8 and 12 in 2016. Filming then took place in Selangor at locations such as Kuala Kangsar, Kuala Selangor and Banting in 2017. Singers Zainal Abidin and Viona wrote songs for the film, while Daniel Veerapen composed the score.
