= Uyaina Arshad =

Malaysian television host, actress and model

- اوياعنا ارشد
- Born: Saidatul Naseha Uyaina binti Arshad; 16 November 1992 (age 33); Kuala Kangsar, Perak, Malaysia
- Education: Bachelor of Laws
- Alma mater: University of Malaya (UM)
- Occupations: Host Television; Actress; Model; Singer
- Years active: 2015–present
- Employer: Media Prima (2015-present)
- Known for: 2015 Nona Manis Search Champion; Miss; Woman Today; Asian Muslim Princess Champion 2018; Asian ACTION; D'Academy Asia; Indonesian ACTION; Golden Memories Asia
- Spouse: Raja Syahiran Raja Azhanrianshah (m. 2021)
- Children: Raja Urhan Bin Raja Syahiran
- Parents: Siti Noor Farah Jaafar (mother); Arshad Ibrahim (father)
- Relatives: Mohd Attaful Uzair Arshad (brother)

Saidatul Naseha Uyaina Arshad (born 16 November 1992) is a Malaysian presenter, actress and female model. Starting her early career in the entertainment industry as a theater actress, Uyaina was crowned the winner of the 2015 Pencarian Nona Manis (Miss Sweet) organized by TV3 and is known as the host of Nona (2016–2017) and Wanita Hari Ini (2017–present).

== Career ==
Uyaina was active as a theatre actress while studying at university and became widely known as the winner of the 2015 Pencarian Nona Manis organized by TV3, and was crowned as the Champion. Later, she was offered to host the show Nona from 2016 to 2017 replacing Fouziah Gous. In 2017, Uyaina was also offered to be the host of the show Wanita Hari Ini (WHI) on TV3 with Fiza Sabjahan, Hazrena Kassim and Sugeeta Chandran.

In May 2018, she participated in the Puteri Muslimah Asia 2018 Competition which was held for the first time on Indosiar. She emerged as the Champion by defeating 17 other participants from 6 countries; Indonesia, Malaysia, Singapore, Turkey, Brunei and Timor Leste.

Uyaina's career began to grow not only in Malaysia but also in Indonesia after being crowned the champion of Puteri Muslimah Asia. Has over 1 million followers on Instagram hers, and has become an increasingly well-known young woman icon. Her acting career began with the successful role of Maryam in the drama adaptation of the novel Lelaki Kiriman Tuhan starring Remy Ishak and Mira Filzah.

In 2020, Uyaina starred in two TV drama series, namely Jujurlah Nikahi Aku as Nurin Asyifah, and Perempuan Tanpa Dosa as Usu Sakinah. She was paired with Zul Ariffin in the drama Love Elsa by playing the role of Ammara.

Uyaina made her debut on the big screen through the film Siapa Tutup Lampu? (2021) playing the role of Azie. She and her husband, Raja Syahiran appeared with the single "Hingga Akhir Waktu" which marked her debut as a singer.

== Personal life ==
Uyaina is the youngest of four siblings and has two older brothers and one older sister. She holds a Bachelor of Laws degree from the University of Malaya (UM).

Her father, Arshad Ibrahim died in New Zealand at the age of 37 in 1997 while serving as a naval officer when she was only 5 years old. Since then, her mother, Siti Noor Farah Jaafar, has never remarried until now.

Uyaina married singer and actor, Raja Syahiran Raja Azhanrianshah with one word on December 20, 2021. She gave birth to her first baby boy on 8 September 2022, who was named Raja Urhan.

Her eldest brother, Mohd Attaful Uzair Arshad, died of a heart attack on 19 August 2022 at the age of 35.

Around 2023, she suffered a miscarriage of her second child. On 17 May 2024, she safely gave birth to another son at the Tuanku Mizan Armed Forces Hospital, Kuala Lumpur.

== Filmography ==
=== Films ===
Year	Title	Character	Notes	Ref.
2021	Siapa Tutup Lampu?	Azie	First film	

=== Drama ===
Year	Title	Character	TV Channel	Notes
2018	Lelaki Kiriman Tuhan	Maryam	Astro Oasis	Drama adapted from a novel by Umie Nadzimah
2019	Curi-Curi Cinta	Fariza	Astro Ria	Drama adapted from a novel by Siti Rosmizah
2019	Sara Sajeeda	Iman Dahlia	TV3	Malaysia-Pakistan collaboration drama
2020	Jujurlah Nikahi Aku	Nurin Asyifa	Astro Ria	Drama adapted from a novel by Umie Nadzimah
2020	Perempuan Tanpa Dosa	Usu Sakinah	Astro Ria	Drama adapted from a novel by Fatinilam Sari Ahmad
2021	Ahli Bapak Bapak Club	Yem	Astro Ria	
2021	Love Elsa	Ammara	Astro Ria	Drama adapted from a novel by Acik Lana
2022	Kau Cipta Kasih	Khadijah	TV3	Drama adapted from a novel by Azilah Wahab
2022	Salam Squad 3.0	Serena	Astro Ceria	
2022	Lockdown 2	Dila	Astro Ria	

=== Telefilm ===
Year	Title	Character	TV Channel	Notes
2019	Pintu Berkah: Ampun Maaf di Ujung Ramadan	Fatimah	Indosiar	First telefilm
2020	Bercinta Dengan Jin	Maya	Astro Citra	
2021	Lagenda Puteri Bulan	Puteri Zaleha	Astro Ceria	

=== Television ===
Year	Title	Role	TV Channel	Notes
2015	Pencarian Nona Manis	Contestants	TV3	1st Place
2015	Famili 9	Himself	TV9	With her husband and family, and together fighting with the Marsha Milan Family in (Episode 26)
2016–2017	Nona	Host	TV3	
2017	Kasshoorga Talk	Host	Astro Oasis	
2017–present	Wanita Hari Ini	Host	TV3	
2018	Puteri Muslimah Asia	Participants	Indosiar	Champion 1
2018	AKSI Asia	Lawyer	Indosiar	
2018–present	D'Academy Asia	Lawyer	Indosiar	
2019	Pesona Pengantin	Lawyer	Astro Prima	
2019	AKSI Indonesia	Lawyer	Indosiar	
2019	Golden Memories Asia	Lawyer	Indosiar	
2020–present	MeleTOP	Guest Host	Astro Ria	
2020	Ratu Hijabista	Host	Astro Ria	co-host Fikry Ibrahim
2020	Vokal Mania	Host	TV3	co-host AC Mizal. Uyaina is the replacement for Azira Shafinaz as co-host on the Vokal Mania show.
2020	Sepahtu Reunion Live 2020	Ros	Astro Warna	Guest Artist: Episode "Sampai Syurga"
2021	Famili Duo (Season 1)	Host	TV3	
2021	Leo The Wildlife Ranger	Ranger Joey	Mediacorp Okto	Main
2021	Sepahtu Reunion Live 2021	Raisa	Astro Warna	Guest Artist: Episode "Rahsia Lorong"
2022	Romantika Raya	Herself	Astro Ria	With her husband Raja Syahiran
2022	Borak Hantu	Guest Artist	Astro Ria	
2023	All Together Now Malaysia (season 2)	Jury	Astro Ria	
2023	Sepahtu Reunion Al-Puasa	Maria	Astro Warna	Guest Artist: Episode "Sepakat Membawa Berkat"
2023	Family Feud Malaysia	Herself	Astro Ria	With her husband and family, and together fighting with the Marsha Milan Family in (Episode 1)
2023	Prankap!	Herself	Astro Warna	With her husband
2023	D'Academy Asia (Season 6)	Host	Indosiar	
2025	Sepahtu Reunion Al-Raya	Tasha	Astro Prima	Guest Artist: Episode "Cukup Derita Itu"

== Discography ==
Single
Title	Year
"Hingga Akhir Waktu"	2022

== Awards and nominations ==
Year	Award	Category	Recipients/Nominated Works	Decision
2021	34th Daily News Popular Star Awards	Popular Female TV Actors	Uyaina Arshad	Nominated
2021	34th Daily News Popular Star Awards	Popular TV presenter	Uyaina Arshad	Nominated
2023	35th Berita Harian Popular Star Award	Popular TV presenter	Uyaina Arshad	Nominated
2024	36th Berita Harian Popular Star Award	Popular TV presenter	Uyaina Arshad	Won
