= Tan Yan Wei =

Tan Yan Wei (Yuan)
- Born: Tan Yan Wei; 28 January 1975; Kuantan, Pahang, Malaysia
- Died: 27 April 2011 (aged 36) Kuala Lumpur, Malaysia
- Genre: Film score
- Occupation: Composer
- Years active: 2004–2011
- Label: N/A
- Website: N/A

Tan Yan Wei (28 January 1975 – 27 April 2011), or simply known as Yuan, was a Malaysian composer. He is known for his film scores for the films Puteri Gunung Ledang (2004), 2005 Burmese film Kyan Sit Min, Malaysian 3D English animation film SeeFood and the Malaysian action drama film Bunohan.

== Filmography ==
Year	Title	Notes
2004	Puteri Gunung Ledang	Composer (Alongside M. Nasir)
2005	Kyan Sit Min	Composer
2011	SeeFood	Composer (Later taken over by 'Imaginex Studios' after his death)
2011	Bunohan	Composer

== Awards and nominations ==
=== Awards ===
Awards
Year	Award	Categories	Nominated Work	Result
2005	18th Malaysian Film Festival	Best Music Score	Puteri Gunung Ledang (Music Score)	Won
2013	25th Malaysian Film Festival	Best Original Score	Bunohan (Music Score)	Won

== Death ==
Yan Wei died at the Pantai Hospital in Kuala Lumpur on 27 April 2011, from complications of hyperthyroidism at age 36.
