= Kongsi (film) =

- Film poster
- Directed by: Farid Kamil
- Written by: Fadzil Zahari; Farid Kamil
- Screenplay by: Farid Kamil
- Produced by: David Teo
- Starring: Shaheizy Sam; Fizo Omar; Yana Samsudin; Azad Jasmin; Bront Palarae
- Music by: Brian Ng
- Production company: Metrowealth Pictures
- Distributed by: MIG Pictures
- Release date: 12 May 2011 (Malaysia)
- Running time: 82 minutes
- Country: Malaysia
- Language: Malay
- Budget: MYR 1.82 million
- Box office: MYR 8.09 million

Kongsi (English: Share) is a 2011 Malaysian Malay-language action comedy film directed by Farid Kamil. The film starring Shaheizy Sam, Fizo Omar and Yana Samsudin, tells of a murderer called Tumulak, who came to Malaysia to curb the Malaysian secret societies and relationships Tumulak with ASP Shariff. The movie was aired on May 12, 2011, and has created a record by recording a RM 1.1 million collection within 1 day of the show.

== Plot ==
Tumulak, a murderer sent by his employer, Kimpedu, to curb the secret societies in Malaysia, especially in Kuala Lumpur. At that time, Kuala Lumpur was dominated by three secret societies, each led by Pak Maliki (leader of the Malay secret societies), Jimmy (leader of the Chinese secret societies) and Victor (chief secretary of India). Among the disruptions caused by Tumulak include killing the subordinates of Pak Maliki and Victor's son. This has attracted ASP Shariff's attention to investigate what happened.

== Cast ==
- Shaheizy Sam as Tumulak
- Fizo Omar as ASP Shariff
- Yana Samsudin as Inspector Olla
- Azad Jasmin as Mikail
- Bront Palarae as Kempedu
- Piee as Pak Maliki
- K. Veerasingam as Victor
- Chew Kin Wah as Jimmy
- Alex Yanz as Robert
- Azlan Komeng as Rahim
- Putri Mardiana as Inspector Yati
- Shah Rempit as Radhi
- Farid Kamil as Chief of police

== Reception ==
=== Box office ===
Having opened in 87 cinemas across Malaysia, The movie Kongsi has created history with successfully earning RM 1.08 million in one day. In the first week alone, the film managed to garner a collection of nearly RM7 million, As of June 15, 2011, about a month after the start of the show, Kongsi film scored RM 8.09 million.
