= J Revolusi =

2017 film by Zulkarnain Azhar

- Theatrical release poster.
- Directed by: Zulkarnain Azhar
- Written by: Alfie Palermo
- Story by: Zulkranain Azhar
- Produced by: Gayatri Su-Lin Pillai
- Starring: Zul Ariffin; Izara Aishah; Nur Fazura; Farid Kamil
- Cinematography: Harris Hue Abdullah
- Edited by: Nazim Shah
- Music by: Onn San
- Production companies: Grand Brilliance; Infinitus Productions; Primeworks Studios
- Distributed by: Primeworks Distribution (Malaysia); DLUX Entertainment (Singapore); Youku; iQiyi; China Film Studio (China)
- Release dates: 2 March 2017 (Malaysia); 10 March 2017 (Singapore)
- Running time: 100 minutes
- Country: Malaysia
- Languages: Malay; Mandarin
- Budget: MYR 3 million ($715,649)
- Box office: MYR 7.13 million ($1.66 million)

J Revolusi (English: J Revolution) is a 2017 Malaysian Malay-language action thriller film directed by Zulkarnain Azhar starring Zul Ariffin, Izara Aishah, Nur Fazura and Farid Kamil. This film revolves around Jay Zulkarnain (Zul Ariffin), an assault leader for Malaysia's Unit Tindakhas (Special Forces Unit).

This film was inspired by a famous "James Bond Malaya" trilogy Gerak Kilat, Bayangan Ajal and Jurang Bahaya with the name of "Jefri Zain" acted by the legendary Tan Sri Datuk Dr Jins Shamsudin

This film was a co-production between Grand Brilliance and Infinitus Productions, the latter owned by Hong Kong actor Andy Lau. It was released in Malaysia on 2 March 2017, and in China on iQiyi and Youku. A sequel, J2: J Retribusi was released in June 2021, while a third film is planned.

== Plot ==
Jay Zulkarnain (Zul Ariffin) is an assault leader for the UTK (Unit Tindakan Khas), and he and his squad of operatives are every terrorist's worst nightmare. However, a mysterious terrorist has framed Jay for the murder of one of his squad members, and has also captured his sister Dian (Nur Fazura), who is an undercover agent. To save her sister, Jay must race against time to unravel the secret and reason as to why this terrorist is trying to destroy him.

After the incident of the shootout at the factory, Jay was rushed to the hospital. Jay yells at Jiman as he needs him to find his sister. 6 months later, Chief explains to Jay that Dian is actually still alive.

Jay goes back to work to find his own sister, but he gets captured by the terrorist(Farid Kamil)

Jay goes disguised as a bookkeeper (Hans Isaac) to find the virus at Andra's post office. But an alarm sounds around the place, Jay finally escapes with a motorcycle.

Jay, knowing that Eddie was infected by a virus, he has to save Eddie from the Andra's gang. After Jay defeated Peter, Eddie cannot near by him because there is a virus on her body but she dies.

In the afternoon, Jay goes to Chief's house, but there is a gun on the table. Jay had to rescue him, but he wanted him to arrest Andra. After Andra and Jay fighting on the crane, Jay almost kills Andra on the platform at the crane, causing him to death on the car. Chief explains to Dian why is still angry and takes vengeance on her father. Dian tells to Jay takes care of their father while she started to unload the pistol but she is shot dead by squad member thinking she was going to shoot.

In the end, Jay and Skodeng have going to mission taking a helicopter.

== Cast ==
- Zul Ariffin as Jay Zulkarnain
- Izara Aishah as Eddie / Ida
- Nur Fazura as Dian, Jay's elder sister
- Farid Kamil as Andra
- Iedil Putra as Jiman
- Azad Jasmin as Skodeng, Jay's partner
- Omar Abdullah as Chief / Commander
- Hans Isaac as Bookkeeper
- Peter Davis as Peter
- Azri Iskandar as DSP Malek
- Fatimah Abu Bakar as Skodeng's mother
- Juzzthin as Hacker
- Ijoy Azhari as Chief (young)
- Chelsia Ng as Auction bidder

== Release ==
=== Box office ===
The film collected RM1.4 million in its first three days of its release, later accumulating to about RM4.3 million after 10 days of screening. By four weeks, the film had managed up to a total of RM7 million in gross sales.

== Sequel ==
J Retribusi, the sequel to J Revolusi, began its shoot in November 2018, with a third film titled J Resolusi planned to be written after finishing the second film's filming. The sequel was retitled as J2: J Retribusi was released in June 2021 on Disney+ Hotstar as Hotstar Originals.
