= Farid Kamil =

Malaysian actor, director and screenplay writer

- فريد کميل
- Born: Farid Kamil bin Zahari; 5 May 1981 (age 45); Alor Star, Kedah, Malaysia
- Education: Universiti Teknologi MARA (UiTM)
- Occupations: Actor, screenwriter, director, producer
- Years active: 1999–present
- Spouse: Diana Danielle (m. 2012; div. 2025)
- Children: 2

Farid Kamil Zahari (born 5 May 1981) is a Malaysian actor, director and screenwriter. He is a well-known male model turned actor who has made a big reputation of himself as one of Malaysia's most famous actors since Rosyam Nor in the 1990s for several of his outstanding performances in drama series and movies alike.

== Background ==
Farid Kamil was born in Alor Star, Kedah. He is the eldest son of five siblings to Zahari Che Dan and Sharifah Bardah Syed Abdillah. He is of Malays, Arab and Thai ancestry.

Kamil graduated from Universiti Teknologi MARA with Bachelor's Degree (Hons.) in Performing Arts in 2010.

== Career ==
=== Beginning ===
Kamil began his career in the entertainment industry as a model in 1999 to support his tuition fee - some of the companies he worked for during this early period were Dunhill, Pringles and TM Net. His involvement in the film industry however only began in 2000 when he was discovered by Abdul Razak Mohaideen, a very popular director during that time, and was cast as a minor character in his film; Mistik. Appearing in Mistik was a turning stone for Kamil as he began to catch the attention of local directors and film makers. In 2003, Kamil was cast alongside Erra Fazira in Cinta Kolestrol, playing her younger brother.

=== 2004–2007: Rise to fame and major roles ===
By 2004, Kamil's popularity soared. He continued to appear not only in films alongside prominent names such as Erra Fazira in Hingga Hujung Nyawa and Kuliah Cinta in a supporting role and a leading man debut in a thriller movie titled Tujuh Perhentian . In the same year, Kamil also appeared alongside Datuk Siti Nurhaliza for a Hotlink advertisement campaign. The campaign itself helped Kamil to be recognised as well as becoming a fan favourite.

Kamil starred mainly in Abdul Razak's movies until 2006, where Kamil joined forces with a different director; Ahmad Idham in his movie Remp-It not only as the lead actor, but also the screenwriter, at the behest of the producer. The movie was a box office success and was followed by two sequels.

With his career on a roll, Kamil took one of his most challenging roles to date in 2008 when he appeared in Osman Ali's Anak Halal. His appearance in the movie as well as in Mamat Khalid's Kala Malam Bulan Mengambang made him one of the most sought actors during that time. Kamil was also recognised when he was nominated for Best Actor for his portrayal in Anak Halal and best supporting actor for his role in Kala Malam Bulan Mengambang in the 21st Malaysia Film Festival in 2008.

=== 2010–present: Venture in directing ===
In 2010, Farid was entrusted to direct the third and final movie in the Remp-It series. However, the movie snowballed bad publicity due to perceptions that it had glorified mat rempit culture which was very prevalent in TV dramas and movies at that time, much to the Government's chagrin. The movie was subsequently retitled V3-Samseng Jalanan.

Farid involved in two film productions in 2017: the first one is the action film J Revolusi while the other being Tombiruo: Penunggu Rimba, an adventure film adapted from a novel written by Ramlee Awang Murshid.

== Personal life ==
=== Relationship ===
Kamil was romantically linked with a number of actresses. From his break-up with his then girlfriend Irma Hasmie some years ago, his alleged romantic entanglement with Lisa Surihani and the latest one being his courtship with starlet Diana Danielle. On 16 October, it was confirmed that he is engaged to Diana Danielle and the couple got married on 3 November 2012. They now have two children together, named Muhammad and Nur Aurora.

=== Drug allegations and assaults ===
On 12 January 2018, Kamil was remanded for four days for investigations, after he allegedly slapped a policeman and kicked a member of the public. Authorities also ran a urine test, in which he tested positive for marijuana, according to the report.

== Recognition ==
On 16 December 2017, Kamil, along with Singaporean actor Aaron Aziz (his co-star in Evolusi KL Drift film series), was awarded Darjah Indera Mahkota Pahang (DIMP) by the Sultan of Pahang by carrying the title of Dato' in conjunction with Ahmad Shah of Pahang's birthday. However, the State Secretary announced that the title of DIMP bestowed on him was revoked by the Sultan of Pahang with effect from 1 February 2021.

- Pahang
  - Knight Companion of the Order of the Crown of Pahang (DIMP) – Dato' (2017, revoked 1 February 2021)

== Filmography ==
=== Film ===
Year	Title	Role	Notes
2003	Mistik	Jeffrey	Debut film appearances
2003	Cinta Kolesterol	Saiful	
2004	Kuliah Cinta	Amirul	
2004	Hingga Hujung Nyawa	Shawn	
2004	7 Perhentian	Amirul	
2004	Tangkai Jering	Norman Hakim	
2005	Potret Mistik	Zack	
2005	Cinta Fotokopi	Zahid	
2005	Anak Mami Kembali	Farid	
2006	Main-Main Cinta	Beego	
2006	Remp-It	Madi	Also as a screenwriter
2007	Chermin	Yusof	
2007	Anak Halal	Indera Putera Hisham	
2008	Kala Malam Bulan Mengambang	Jongkidin	
2008	Evolusi KL Drift	Sham	
2008	Apa Kata Hati	Aidil Fitri	
2008	I'm Not Single	Adam Ghani	
2009	Papadom	Hisham Hashim	
2009	Lembing Awang Pulang Ke Dayang	Awang	
2009	Duhai Si Pari-pari	Sports car Owners	
2010	V3 Samseng Jalanan	Ahmad Asrudy @ Rudy	Also as director, screenplay and story
2010	Evolusi KL Drift 2	Sham	
2010	Semerah Cinta Stilletto	Sulaiman Toyol aka Leman Toyol aka Leto	
2010	Lagenda Budak Setan	Kasya	
2010	Cuti-Cuti Cinta	Omar Rudy	
2010	Estet	Farid	
2010	Aku Masih Dara	Zachery	
2011	Kongsi	Chief of Police	As director, screenwriter and screenplay
2011	3,2,1 Cinta	Nazril	
2012	3 Temujanji	Farid	
2012	Hantu Gangster	Ewan	
2012	PE3	Megat	As director, screenwriter and screenplay
2012	Lagenda Budak Setan 2: Katerina	Kasya	
2013	Dampak	Giran	
2013	Bencinta	Faizal	
2013	Kolumpo	Himself	Special appearances
2014	Apokalips X	X	
2014	Pengantin Malam	Razif	
2014	Anak Jantan	Darin	
2014	Kaki Kitai	Detective Inspector Farid	
2014	Lagenda Budak Setan 3: Kasyah	Kasyah	
2015	Love Supermoon	Razak Abu Bakar	
2015	Abang Lejen	Ajim	
2015	Hantu Bungkus Ikat Tepi	Farid	
2016	Langit Cinta	Budiman	
2017	J Revolusi	Andra	
2017	Tombiruo: Penunggu Rimba	Amiruddin	
2017	Pinjamkan Hatiku	Dr. Hasnan	
2022	Remp-It 2	Madi	As director and producer
2023	Sumpahan Syaitan	Sam	
2023	Anwar: The Untold Story	Anwar Ibrahim	
2024	Gold	Misbun Sidek	
2025	Bisikan Dosa	Ayden	
2025	Telaga Suriram	Zakir	

=== Television series ===
Year	Title	Role	TV channel
2001	Fakulti	Isma	TV2
2004	Begitulah Cinta	Andy	TV3
2008	Takdir Yang Terindah	Juffri	TV1
2008	Enigma	Adam	TV3
2009	Tiga Janda	Amar	Astro Prima
2009	Cinta Tikar Sejadah	Hazrey Hussein	Astro Oasis
2009	Mertua vs Menantu (Season 2)		Astro Prima
2010	Lagenda Budak Setan The Series	Kasyah	Astro Prima
2010	Korban 44	Bah Raden	Astro Citra
2011	Wasiat	Izran	Astro Prima
2013	Jodoh Itu Milik Kita	Aariz Danial	Astro Mustika HD
2016	Qanun 99	Khalil	Astro Oasis
2018	Lafazkan Kalimah Cintamu	Tengku Ryan Ameer	Astro Ria
2020	Pelindung Seorang Puteri	Saiful/Epul	Astro Ria
2021	Masih Ada Rindu	Hadi/Hakim	TV3
2022	Pok Ya Cong Codel: Memburu Siti	JJ	Astro Ria
2025	Santau Perempuan Terlarang	Zakuan	tonton

=== Telemovie ===
Year	Title	Role	TV channel	Notes
2009	Lu'lu	Shauqi	Astro Ria	
2009	Mata Di Jiwa	Jeffrey	Astro Ria	
2011	7 Lagu	Farhan	Astro Citra	
2012	Apa Dah Jadi?		Astro Prima	
2013	Racun Ibu	Shahrin	TV3	
2014	Misteri Bulan Madu	Farid	Hypp Sensasi	
2014	Sayang Awak Sangat-sangat	Iman	Hypp Sensasi	
2014	Kem Cuci Tangan (Kecut)	Joe	Hypp Sensasi	
2014	Tolong Aku Nak Puasa!	Amir	Astro Ria	
2015	Hantu Raya Tumpang Beraya	Ikram	Astro Ria	Also as director
2016	Sedikit Waktu	Farid	Astro Ria	
2016	Segi Tiga		Astro Ria	
2017	Syukur Syawal	Syukur	TV3	
2018	Hilang Akal	Adam	Astro Citra	
2020	Puyah & Putat	Putat	Astro Citra	
2021	Diam Tanda Setuju		Astro Citra	
2021	Zombie Jarum Vaksin	Farid	Astro Citra	
2022	Sakanak	Azmi	TV3	
2022	Tersimpang Ke Alam Bunian	Duan	Astro Citra	

=== Television ===
Year	Title	TV channel	Notes
2020	Sepahtu Reunion Live	Astro Warna	Episode: "Demdam Damak dan Deli"
2020	Sepahtu Reunion Live	Astro Warna	Episode: "Pelesit Kota"

=== Theater ===
Year	Title	Role	Issue	Notes
2003	Dimana Bulan Selalu Retak	Iqbal	Anjung Seri Production	Original Work A. Samad Said
