= Diana Danielle =

American actress and singer (born 1991)

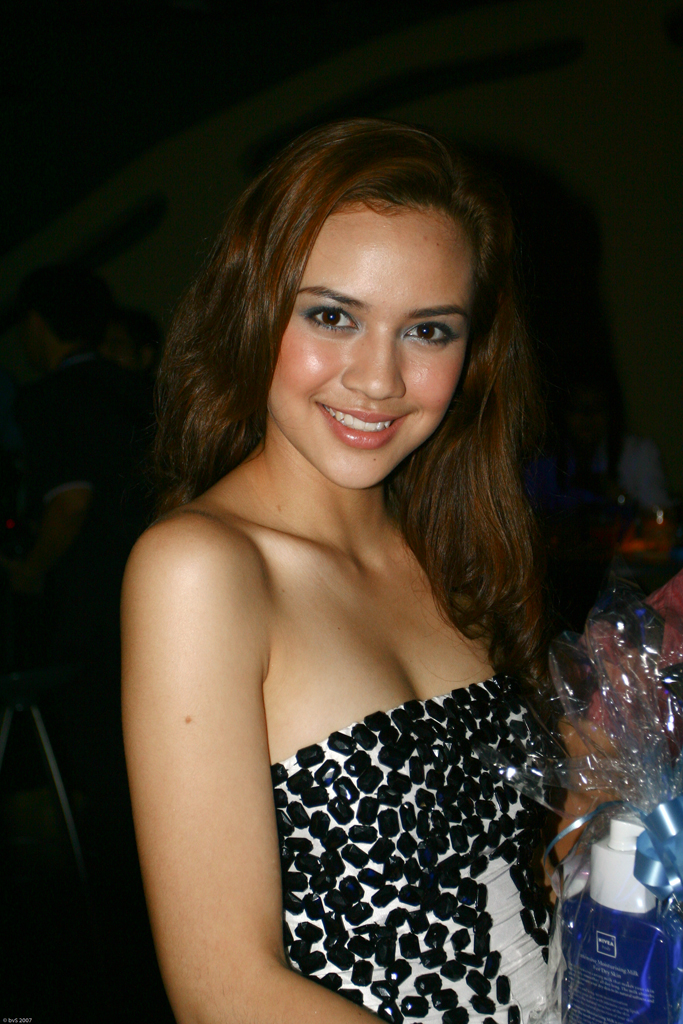
- Born: Diana Danielle Danny Beeson; 22 November 1991 (age 34); Houston, Texas, United States
- Occupations: Actress; Singer; Host Television
- Years active: 2002–present
- Spouse: Farid Kamil (m. 2012; div. 2025)
- Children: 2
- Parents: Norsiah Ramli (mother); Danny Beeson (father)
- Relatives: Halley Hayden

Diana Danielle Danny Beeson (born 22 November 1991), is an American (Note: Though she was born in the United States to a Malaysian mother and an American father, Diana Danielle grew up in Malaysia, identifies as Malaysian and only holds Malaysian citizenship as dual citizenship is prohibited in Malaysia.) actress and singer. Starting her career at the age of 11, she primarily worked on television and film.

== Early life ==
Diana Danielle was born in Houston, Texas, and raised in Malaysia. Her mother is Malaysian of Malay descent, and her father is American. She was raised by her mother.

== Career ==
Danielle holds a high-profile acting career and she is in demand for a variety of jobs such as modeling, singing and appearing in commercials. She debuted in the acting world by chance. Actor Norman Hakim discovered Danielle when he went to visit her family when she was 9. She took up the offer and had a supporting role in Aziz M. Osman Idola alongside Norman who played her father. Danielle rose to fame after her debut role in local TV3 television series Air Mata Maria. She was only 14 at that time when she was given a role that is 20 years of age.

On the public front, Danielle stays close to her fans on Facebook with regular updates (in Malay and English) about her career developments and more. She has over 1.1 million followers on Facebook.

Danielle moved to Australia in early 2013 to pursue her studies in fine arts. She is a student at The National Institute of Dramatic Art in Sydney, Australia.

== Personal life ==
She married Malaysian actor Farid Kamil in 2012. They have two children together, namely Muhammad and Nur Aurora. They later divorced in 2025.

Danielle has been diagnosed with attention deficit hyperactivity disorder.

== Filmography ==
=== Film ===
Year	Title	Role	Notes
2002	Idola	Melissa	Debut film appearances
2008	Evolusi KL Drift	Sara	
2009	Setem	Suraya	
2009	Maut	Umie	
2009	Bohsia: Jangan Pilih Jalan Hitam	Aishah	
2010	Kecoh Betul	Dayana	
2010	Magika	Ayu	
2011	Dalam Botol	Dina	
2012	Jiwa Taiko	Trisha	
2012	Hantu Gangster	Jameela	
2013	Sembunyi: Amukan Azazil	Aishah	Nomination - Best Lead Actress (Malaysia Film Festival)
2014	Kami Histeria	Laila	
2014	Supersquad The Movie	Elly (voice)	
2016	Hanyut	Nina	Won - Best Supporting Actress (Malaysia Film Festival & Anugerah Skrin)
2018	Gol & Gincu Vol. 2	Zak	Won - Best Lead Actress (Malaysia Film Festival)
2021	Hanya Namamu Laila	Laila	
2022	Spilt Gravy on Rice	Jackie	
2023	Imaginur	Nur	Nominated - Best Lead Actress (New York Asian Film Festival)

=== Television series ===
Year	Title	Role	TV channel	Notes
2006	Janji Diana	Elly	TV2	
2006	Gol & Gincu The Series	Ratu	8TV	
2007	Air Mata Maria	Maria	TV3	
2007	Farah Syakira	Farah Syakira	TV2	
2008	Rahsia Di Sebalik Wajah	Jasmin	TV2	
2017	Di Sebalik Wajah	Nadia	Hypp Sensasi	
2017	Cerita Dari Mastika		Astro Prima	Episode: "Wanita Kaya Mati Terbakar Dalam Koma"
2017	Cerita Dari Mastika		Astro Prima	Episode: "Aku Sudah Mati"
2017	Raisha	Raisha	TV3	
2017	My Coffee Prince	Mariam	Astro Ria	
2018	Raisha 2	Raisha	TV3	
2019	Ombak Rindu The Series	Mila	Iflix	
2020	Camelia	Mariam/Camelia	TV3	
2020	Syurga Untukmu	Atikah	TV3	
2020	Janda Kosmopolitan	Marwin	Awesome TV	
2021	Ganjil	Nabila	Viu	
2022	She Was Pretty	Nadia Rahman	Viu	

=== Telemovie ===
Year	Title	Role	TV channel
2009	Takbir Terakhir		Astro Prima
2011	Di Telapak Kaki Bonda	Fairuz	TV3
2012	Satu Malam Perawan	Aisyah	Astro Ria
2014	Perempuan Lindungan Kaabah	Hanan	Astro First Exclusive
2015	Talak	Yasmin	TV3
2015	Kapal Kertas	Cikgu Aira	TV3
2015	Pengantin Gila	Dania	TV3
2015	Lara Perindu	Fuza	Astro Prima
2016	Sedikit Waktu	Liza	Astro Ria
2016	Anak Mat Salleh Tapi Melayu	Amelia	TV3
2016	Kalau Jodoh Tak Ke Mana		TV1
2017	Pergilah Cinta	Liyana	TV3
2017	Nora Bam Boom	Nora	TV2
2020	Mencari Mardhatillah	Salina	TV Okey
2020	Line Puaka	Watie	Astro Citra

=== Television ===
Year	Title	Role	TV channel	Notes
2009	Project N.S	Host	8TV	
2018	Kata Serasi	Host	NTV7	with Nazrudin Rahman

== Discography ==
Single
Year	Title	Notes
2010	"Penyembuh Rindu" (with Mawi)	OST Magika
2015	"Pujaan"	OST Kami Histeria
2016	"Luar Biasa"	OST Ainur Mardhiyah
2016	"Tentang Kita" (About Us)	
2023	"Bersama Dengan Rindu"	
2025	"Raja Dusta"	

As featured artist
Year	Title	Artist	Album	Notes
2021	"We Live To Give"	Simon Webbe, Asyraf Nasir, Athalia & Shalma Eliana	Single	Special collaboration with The Giving Bank Organisation to encourage giving and healing.
2022	"Heaven"	Calum Scott	Single	Special collaboration with Southeast Asian artists.

== Endorsements ==
- Fiorucci
- Volvo
- Watson's
- Pampers
- Shuemura
- Milo
- Hazeline Snow Vietnam Market
- Telecom I-talk
- Harian Metro
- Avon for Wish Parfume
- Fair and Lovely
- Bauch and Lomb contact lens
- Kentucky Fried Chicken
- Binary Body Scrub
- T3 Body Wash
- F&N Soya Bean
- Rafflesia Pearl
- Jeteine Hair Colour
- Tan & Tan Corporate Websites
- Tenaga Nasional
- Inner Shine for Brands
- Tuala wanita pakai buang
- Nanowhite
- Tongkat Ali

== Awards and nominations ==
Year	Award	Category	Nominated work	Result
2008	22nd Bintang Popular Berita Harian Awards	Most Popular TV Actress	—N/a	Nominated
2009	23rd Bintang Popular Berita Harian Awards	Most Popular Film Actress	—N/a	Nominated
2010	24th Bintang Popular Berita Harian Awards	Most Popular Film Actress	—N/a	Nominated
2011	25th Bintang Popular Berita Harian Awards	Most Popular Film Actress	—N/a	Nominated
2014	2nd Warna Comedian Awards	Best Comedy Actress (with Fazura)	Kami: Histeria	Nominated
2014	26th Malaysia Film Festival	Best Actress	Sembunyi: Amukan Azazil	Nominated
2015	19th Skrin Awards	Best Actress – Drama	Talak	Nominated
2017	29th Malaysia Film Festival	Best Supporting Actress	Hanyut	Won
2017	21st Skrin Awards	Best Supporting Actress – Film	Hanyut	Won
2019	7th Kuala Lumpur Drama Festival Awards	Choice Antagonist Award	Raisha 2	Nominated
2019	30th Malaysia Film Festival	Best Actress	Gol & Gincu Vol. 2	Nominated
