= Bunohan =

2012 film by Dain Iskandar Said

- Theatrical release poster
- Directed by: Dain Iskandar Said
- Written by: Dain Iskandar Said
- Produced by: Nandita Solomon
- Starring: Faizal Hussein; Zahiril Adzim; Pekin Ibrahim; Bront Palarae; Namron; Soffi Jikan
- Cinematography: Jarin Pengpanich
- Edited by: HK Panca
- Music by: Tan Yan Wei
- Production company: Apparat Sdn. Bhd.
- Distributed by: Universal Pictures
- Release dates: 10 September 2011 (TIFF); 8 March 2012 (Malaysia)
- Running time: 97 minutes
- Country: Malaysia
- Languages: Malay; Kelantan Malay
- Box office: MYR 780,000

Bunohan (also under the international title of Bunohan: Return to Murder) is a 2011 Malaysian Malay-language action drama film, written and directed by Dain Iskandar Said. The film features actors Faizal Hussein, Zahiril Adzim and Pekin Ibrahim in leading roles. Bunohan is the second film to be directed by Dain Said. Bunohan had its world premiere at the 2011 Toronto International Film Festival where it was praised for its solid, visceral storytelling and arresting photography.

Bunohan won NETPAC Award at the 2011 Taipei Golden Horse Film Festival. The film was selected as Malaysia's official entry for the Best Foreign Language Film nomination for the 85th Academy Awards in February 2013, but it did not make the final shortlist. This is the second film to be submitted to the Academy Award since Puteri Gunung Ledang in 2004.

Bunohan received thirteen nominations for the 25th Malaysia Film Festival and won eight awards, including the five major categories: Best Picture, Best Director, Best Story, Best Screenplay and Best Actor/Actress, the first time since 2003's KL Menjerit while being the second most awarded film on the Malaysia Film Festival of all time after Layar Lara. The film also earned four Anugerah Skrin nominations, winning the categories for Best Picture and Best Screenplay, while being nominated for Best Director (Dain Said) and the Best Actor (Faizal Hussein) categories.

The film joins a few other Malaysian films including Jogho (1997), Wayang (2008) and Budak Kelantan (2008) which gives an emphasis on the lives of people of the east coast state of Kelantan, either residing in it or migrated elsewhere across the country.

== Plot ==
The film primarily revolves around the family of Pok Eng (Wan Hanafi Su), a once renowned shadow play puppeteer who has gone out of business following the banning of the performance by the local Islamist state government. He was first married to a mysterious woman known as Mek Yah (Tengku Azura) who he was pressured to divorce because of her unorthodox ways. They had his eldest son, llham (Faizal Hussein) who left home at a very young age following his parents' divorce. Pok Eng then remarried, this time to a woman from the city named Mek Na, who he is now separated from and has since returned to the city. Through his second wife, Pok Eng had his middle son, college professor Bakar (Pekin Ibrahim) and the rebellious Adil (Zahiril Adzim), whom his own mother despises for unknown reasons. The family's hometown is in the rural Malaysian town of Bunohan in Kelantan, which is located close to the Thai border.

The story begins with the youngest brother Adil, who is now a young kick-boxer since leaving home five years ago. He has fallen deeply into debt, with little hope of paying his creditors honestly. In desperation, he agrees to an illegal high-stakes death match at a boxing club on the other side of the border. In the midst of the fight, with Adil losing badly, his best friend Muski (Amerul Affendi) bursts into the ring and breaks up the match, dragging Adil away. Adil and Muski return to Bunohan. They take refuge at the swamp of Pok Wah (Nam Ron), the owner of the local fight club and Adil's former mentor. During their journey, Adil almost gets lost while hallucinating about a familiar looking woman but is quickly rescued by Muski.

Meanwhile, the middle brother, Bakar returns to Bunohan from his comfortable upper-middle class life in Klang Valley on the pretense of looking after his ailing father. In reality, he wants to convince his father to sell their family's land to a large business corporation from Kuala Lumpur for a huge amount of money. Although he is the most successful and educated of his brothers, he is also the greediest. Pok Eng refuses to give Bakar their land since Bakar had already received his share and lost it in his previous business ventures. Regardless, Bakar is determined to claim ownership of his family's remaining land. Pok Eng is aware that his second son has plans that will bring disrespect to their family and community.

At the same time, Deng (Bront Palarae), one of the organizers of the fight in Thailand, sends Ilham, who is now a ruthless hired killer, to find and execute Adil to set an example for their other fighters. Ilham reluctantly goes to Bunohan, which he left many years ago after his parents' divorce. Upon returning, memories of loneliness and abandonment flood his mind, and he experiences waves of resentment and regret. As Ilham narrows his focus on his target, he learns from an old friend, Jing (Jimmy Lor) that he and the boy he is supposed to kill are actually half-brothers. However, Ilham is not deterred since he despises his father and hardly knows his stepmother. He then finds his mother's grave in a piece of land near the beach and starts digging for her remains to give her a proper burial. When he finds out that his father's new family is planning to sell the land, he goes all out to prevent this from happening.

When Bakar learns that Adil is also back in town, he becomes nervous since he fears his younger brother will come to claim his share of the land. Jolok (Hushairy Hussain), the local don agrees to help Bakar take control of the land as long as they can become business partners. Bakar arranges for Jolok to visit his father with a business proposition, all while pretending to not know the man. However, Pok Engs senses Jolok's real intentions and sends him away, claiming the land is merely in his name but is not actually his. Regardless, Bakar hires local thugs to dig out the graves. Ilham follows the thugs into the swamp and kills them, but is injured in the process. He is then rescued by the same woman Adil encountered earlier in his hallucinations.

Part of the land is now the site of Pok Wah's fight club, who received it from Adil's mother while she taught him traditional medicines. Awang Sonar (Soffi Jikan), who is Pok Wah's partner, owes Bakar money. Jolok pays of Awang's debts and now Awang has to repay him with the land. They then organize a match with Adil against a fighter from Bachok District. Adil wins the match easily but the money is still not enough to repay Awang's debt.

Ilham and Adil finally come face to face on their father's land. Ilham almost kills his own brother, albeit reluctantly, but is stopped by Pok Wah. While tending to their wounds, Pok Wah and Jing reveal that contrary to popular belief, Adil was not born to Mek Na but was born to both Pok Eng and Mek Yah after their divorce, making him an illegitimate child. Ilham starts to have a change of heart when he learns Adil was born to his own mother and is thus, his biological brother. Finally realizing why Mek Na despised him, he promises to return home to his father for good after one last fight to help Pok Wah and Awang pay off their debts to Jolok and Bakar. Meanwhile, Pok Eng is visited by the spirit lady that appeared before both Adil and Ilham before. She turns out to be their biological mother, Mek Yah, who is now a guardian spirit of the land. She asks Pok Eng to come with her to her realm, but he refuses, saying that he is not done raising their sons properly and can only join her once his duty is completed.

Before the final fight, Bakar goes to meet Muski and pays him to fight Adil by promising to pay off his sick mother's medical bills. At the same time, Jolok rigs the match by putting poison into Adil's medication. During the fight, Muski unwittingly kills his own best friend in the ring. Meanwhile, while the entire village is at the boxing match, Pok Eng is conducting a cleansing ritual in his land to ward off evil spirits. Bakar shows up uninvited and murders his own father in cold blood. At the same time, Ilham confronts Deng, who has come to the village, and asks him to let his brother go. Unwilling to let Adil live, Deng stabs Ilham and leaves him to die at the swamp. With his father and half-brothers now dead, Bakar has full control of his family's land.

The film ends with a shot of board proclaiming the development of a new holiday resort on the land that was once owned by the family.

== Cast ==
- Zahiril Adzim as Adil
- Faizal Hussein as Ilham
- Pekin Ibrahim as Bakar
- Bront Palarae as Deng
- Namron as Pok Wah
- Wan Hanafi Su as Pok Eng
- Tengku Azura as Mek Yah
- Amerul Affendi as Muski
- Soffi Jikan as Awang Sonar
- Hushairy Hussein as Jolok
- Jimmy Lor as Jing
- Ho Yuhang as Cina Burung
- Carliff Carleel as Chart
- Mat Seman as Bakri
- Md Eyzendy as Gasi

== Production ==
According to the official production notes released by film company Apparat, the film was originally given the title Bunga Lalang (Malay: weed flower), referring to character Adil's ring name. It eventually earned its final title of Bunohan as Dain Said encounters the name of the village – situated near the town of Pengkalan Kubor on Kelantan's border with Thailand – during his research, reacting as if he has never heard of the word before (notably, how it reminded him of the word pembunuhan, or 'murder' in Malay).

Dain wrote the screenplay in the span of the 2 years, from 2008 to 2009. Some of the more intricate details of in the setting and narrative of this film, were driven by his childhood memories of growing up in a kampung near said real-life place, as he explains in an interview with magazine FilmMaker:

I grew up with my sisters and parents, near this place called Kampung Bunohan, or Murder or Killing Village, which is the setting of our film, up north close to the border of Southern Thailand, where my father was a cop. It was at the end of the railway line, a two-horse town. The border meant nothing, people just cross it like they were crossing a road. It still happens today actually. There's a strong reminder of the way American directors, (such as Sam Peckingpah [sic] and others), in the 60's and after, who treat Mexico as a mythological paradise for gangsters, misfits and non-conformists. In this part of the world my father told me stories, where violence was prevalent. And the main characters are based on people I knew, such as the kickboxer Adil, and in particular Ilham the assassin, based on someone whom I met in early 2000.

Apparat initially had difficulties in finding adequate resources for film funding and production had to be delayed for a year while waiting for the loan to be processed. The National Film Development Corporation approved a loan after Apparat successfully pitched their idea to the former. The project went into execution after another bank approved a loan that provided special schemes for film financing.

Swamp and tidal movement were the biggest challenges in picking the natural elements for the background, considering that the filming took place in locations across the east coast of Peninsular Malaysia where the region is prone to floods and expected monsoon seasons. Dain gave credit to his team who had gone through various challenges to produce beautiful cinematography for the entire film.

== Release ==
Bunohan had its world premiere at the Toronto International Film Festival and its Asian premiere at the Taipei Golden Horse Film Festival. It screened to critical acclaim at other international film festivals, including Fantastic Fest in 2011, and the Palm Springs and Asean Film Festivals in 2012. It was released in Malaysian theaters on 8 March 2012.

The film was picked by Universal Pictures for distribution in major markets including Australia, New Zealand, France, Germany, and the UK. The distribution there started after Traction Media, a Los Angeles-based sales company acquired the rights to handle the sales to the North American film market by working with Arclight Films via its Asia-focused division, Easternlight Films. Oscilloscope Laboratories acquired North American rights to Bunohan.

Regions	International Premiere Film Host
World Premiere	Toronto International Film Festival
Asian Premiere	Taipei Golden Horse Film Festival
Latin American Premiere	São Paulo International Film Festival
European Premiere	Rotterdam International Film Festival

== Accolades ==
Bunohan was the recipient of a Netpac Award at the Taipei Golden Horse Film Festival and the Golden Hanoman at the 9th Netpac Asian Film Festival (JAFF) held in Yogyakarta. To date, Bunohan has won 8 accolades awarded by 25th Malaysian Film Festival, 3 from the Kuala Lumpur Film Critics Society Awards and two from the Anugerah Skrin 2012.

Ceremony	Category	Recipient(s)	Results
6th Asian Pacific Screen Awards	Achievement In Cinematography	Charin Pengpanich	Nominated
55th Asia Pacific Film Festival	Best Picture	Apparat Sdn. Bhd	Nominated
55th Asia Pacific Film Festival	Best Director	Dain Said	Nominated
25th Malaysia Film Festival	Best Picture	Apparat Sdn. Bhd	Won
25th Malaysia Film Festival	Best Director	Dain Said	Won
25th Malaysia Film Festival	Best Actor	Faizal Hussien	Won
25th Malaysia Film Festival	Best Actor	Pekin Ibrahim	Nominated
25th Malaysia Film Festival	Best Actor	Zahiril Adzim	Nominated
25th Malaysia Film Festival	Best Supporting Actor	Husyairi Husain	Nominated
25th Malaysia Film Festival	Best Supporting Actor	Amirul Affendi	Nominated
25th Malaysia Film Festival	Best Screenplay	Dain Said	Won
25th Malaysia Film Festival	Best Story	Dain Said	Won
25th Malaysia Film Festival	Best Original Score	Tan Yan Wei	Won
25th Malaysia Film Festival	Best Production Design	Dain Said	Won
25th Malaysia Film Festival	Best Sound Editing	Raja Ahmad Shahidaly	Won
25th Malaysia Film Festival	Best Poster Design	Apparat Sdn. Bhd	Nominated
Anugerah Skrin 2012	Best Film	Apparat Sdn. Bhd	Won
Anugerah Skrin 2012	Best Screenplay	Dain Said	Won
Anugerah Skrin 2012	Best Director	Dain Said	Nominated
Anugerah Skrin 2012	Best Actor	Faizal Hussein	Nominated
Kuala Lumpur Film Critics Society Awards 2012	Best Director	Dain Said	Won
Kuala Lumpur Film Critics Society Awards 2012	Best Actor	Faizal Hussein	Won
Kuala Lumpur Film Critics Society Awards 2012	Best Supporting Actor	Wan Hanafi Su	Nominated
Kuala Lumpur Film Critics Society Awards 2012	Best Supporting Actor	Pekin Ibrahim	Nominated
Kuala Lumpur Film Critics Society Awards 2012	Best Supporting Actor	Hushairy Hussein	Won
Kuala Lumpur Film Critics Society Awards 2012	Best Screenplay	Dain Said	Nominated
