= Tombiruo: Penunggu Rimba =

2017 film by Seth Larney

- Theatrical release poster
- Directed by: Seth Larney
- Screenplay by: Yasmin Yaacob; Choong Chi Ren
- Based on: Tombiruo: Penunggu Rimba by Ramlee Awang Murshid
- Produced by: Zurina Ramli
- Starring: Zul Ariffin; Nabila Huda; Farid Kamil; Faizal Hussein; Hasnul Rahmat; M. Nasir; Michael Chen; Azlym Aziz; Farah Ahmad; Aiman Kamal
- Cinematography: Khalid Zakaria
- Edited by: Nazim Shah
- Music by: Luka Kuncevic
- Production companies: Astro Shaw; Layar Sunan Karangkraf; Ideate Media; AMC Studio; IDW Entertainment.
- Release dates: 12 October 2017 (Malaysia, Singapore & Brunei)
- Running time: 115 minutes
- Country: Malaysia
- Languages: Malay, Kadazandusun
- Budget: MYR 6 million (estimated)
- Box office: MYR 8 million

Tombiruo: Penunggu Rimba (English: Tombiruo: Guardian of the Jungle) is a 2017 Malaysian Malay-language action adventure film directed by Australian filmmaker Seth Larney, based on the 1998 novel of the same name by Ramlee Awang Murshid. It was released on 12 October 2017.

== Synopsis ==
A Bobohizan high priestess in the interiors of Sabah helps a young rape victim deliver her baby. However, the rapist comes to kill the baby to destroy any evidence of his actions. The young mother dies during childbirth and the rapist is stunned to see the disfigured face of his son. While the rapist is still in shock, the priestess kills him. The priestess senses that the baby is no ordinary child, but the Tombiruo, guardian of the forest. she floats him off into the river as an offering to the jungle in order to protect him from the outside world that would torment him for his looks. The Tombiruo is found by a former soldier who now lives as a hermit in the jungle. The soldier raises the Tombiruo as his own son by teaching him to control his powers through love. He gives the Tombiruo a dagger and tells him to use it to protect, not destroy.

Over two decades later, a multinational corporation, Anak Bumi is planning to build a dam in the jungle. The project would make its founders, brothers Berham and Juslan wealthier than they already are. However, Berham makes a shocking announcement during a press conference that his Anak Bumi will not be building the dam since it will cost many tribesmen and women in the jungle their home. Meanwhile, Salina's husband, forest ranger Amiruddin is on his way to meet his wife and in-laws at the press conference.

The press conference is interrupted when a nearby village is attacked by thugs from the city. Berham and his younger daughter, Salina rush over to help out. The Tombiruo and his father try to help the villagers fight off the thugs. However, the Tombiruo's father is killed by the thugs who then try to escape in their jeep. The Tombiruo tries to chase them down and they end up crashing into the car carrying Berham and Salina. Salina's husband, forest ranger Amiruddin finds the crash site and Salina dies in his arms. He finds Berham already dead and the masked Tombiruo attacking Juslan, who arrived before him. The Tombiruo runs away after Amiruddin shows up, leading Amiruddin to assume the Tombiruo murdered his wife and father-in-law. Amirudding swears to hunt down the Tombiruo and avenge their deaths.

The following day, Baizura, Berham's estranged elder daughter returns to attend her father and sister's funeral. She is advised by her uncle, Juslan to ignore her late father's decision and proceed with the dam's construction since their company has been on the decline. He then introduces her to Wong, Anak Bumi's charismatic head of security, who promises to protect their family from anyone who opposes the construction of the dam. However, Baizura is unsure whether to honour her father's last wish or to save his company from going bankrupt.

Meanwhile, a reporter from Peninsular Malaysia named Wan Suraya is investigating the connection between Berham's shocking decision and the attack on the village. She learns from the villagers about the Tombiruo, the mystical creature from the forest that protected them from the thugs. While visiting one of Anak Bumi's factories, she sees the Tombiruo who had just beaten up the thugs that attacked the village with her own eyes. Suraya tries to approach the Tombiruo but he escapes. Despite being summoned back to the city by her editor, she continues to stay in Sabah to investigate the case after finding out Wong makes more money than he should.

Later that evening, Suraya visits Berham's family mansion where a fundraiser is being held to collect enough donation for the villagers. She is caught eavesdropping on one of Wong's secret conversations and he starts to chase her. She flees into the jungle and is saved by the Tombiruo, who takes her back to his tree house in the heart of the jungle. She tries to befriend him and learns that his real name is Ejim. When she unmasks him, she is terrified by his scarred face. Ashamed, the Tombiruo leaves and Suraya spends the night alone.

At the same time, Amiruddin noticed Suraya being chased into the jungle and tries to find her by himself. He then finds her in the tree house and attacks Ejim. The priestess communicates through their minds and reveals to them that Amiruddin and Ejim are actually twins. Sensing that Ejim is the Tombiruo, she sacrificed him to the jungle but gave Amiruddin away to a tribesman who gave him away to an orphanage in the city. Amiruddin demands to know why Ejim killed Salina and Berham, but Ejim claims that they were already killed by the man who arrived earlier than him. Suraya then shows Amiruddin the secret conversation Wong was having with a mysterious which she recorded in her smart phone before she was forced to flee into the jungle. Amirudding recognizes the unknown man's voice as Juslan, who has been plotting to take control of his brother company. Amiruddin notices that he and Ejim have the same scar on their arm.

The three are then attacked by Juslan and Wong. While protecting Suraya, Ejim is fatally shot by Wong who is then burned to death when his leg gets stuck under a burning tree. Amiruddin tries to avenge Salina by killing Juslan but Ejim begs him not to. However, Juslan then tries to stab Amiruddin in the back. Ejim suddenly remembers his father advising him to control his powers through love. Ejim causes the ground to split into two, causing Juslan to fall to his death. The forest then heals Ejim's wounds and he survives.

Amiruddin invites Ejim to come live with him in the city but Ejim refuses, claiming that it is his duty to stay in the jungle to protect it from the greedy like Juslan and Wong. Suraya promises to keep the story of the Tombiruo a myth and Amiruddin promises to visit his brother one day. Back in the city, Baizura takes her father's place as the director of Anak Bumi and decides to uphold her father's dying wishes. Amiruddin tells his son, Amirul about his uncle who lives in the jungle.

In a mid-credits scene, Ejim picks up a paper that was blowing by, which turns out to be a page from the journal of Laksamana Sunan.

== Cast ==
- Zul Ariffin as Ejim, a mysterious man regarded as the Tombiruo or hidden spirit of the jungle
- Farid Kamil as Amiruddin
- Nabila Huda as Wan Suraya, a reporter for Sinar Harian
- Farah Ahmad as Monsiroi, a bobohlian who helped deliver Ejim's birth
- Faizal Hussein as Pondolou, Ejim's adoptive father
- M. Nasir as Tan Sri Berham, owner of a logging company
- Marlia Musa as Bonda, Berham's wife
- Hasnul Rahmat as Juslan, Berham's brother
- Faye Kusairi as Salina
- Dynas Mokhtar as Baizura
- Atu Zero as Ondu
- Michael Chen as Wong
- Rayyan as Ejim (as a child)
- Aiman Kamal as Faizal
- Azlym Aziz as Tawarid
- Nelissa Nizam as Tobugi

== Reception ==
=== Box-office ===
The film collected up to RM2 million in ticket sales after 4 days of its theatrical release in Malaysia, Singapore and Brunei; which would later accumulate to RM 5 million after 10 days of screening and RM 10 Million after 2 weeks.
