= Kaki Kitai =

- Directed by: Azaromi Ghazali
- Produced by: Mejar (K) David Teo
- Starring: Shaheizy Sam; Fezrul Khan; Farid Kamil; Epy Kodiang; Adam Corrie; Emily Chan
- Cinematography: Areel Abu Bakar
- Edited by: Brian Ng
- Music by: Brian Ng
- Production company: Metrowealth Movies
- Distributed by: MIG Pictures
- Release date: 20 November 2014
- Running time: 83 minutes
- Country: Malaysia
- Language: Malay
- Box office: MYR 0.55 billion

Kaki Kitai (English: Our Feet) is a 2014 Malaysian Malay-language action comedy film directed by Azaromi Ghazali. It stars Shaheizy Sam, Fezrul Khan, Farid Kamil, Adam Corrie, Epy Kodiang, and Emily Chan.

== Synopsis ==
Tell about 2 Grenggo / Din friends & Ayoi who are less astute coming from the village and trying to act smartly. Din is also 3 years living in Kuala Lumpur. The story begins when Din welcomes Ayoi who just arrived from the village at the bus station. They unintentionally interrupted the operation of the policemen who were on duty and had provoked the Detective Inspector Farid. Farid's coincidence is a good friend of Din & Ayoi while in school. There were only those who had been disturbed by the work of Detective Inspector Farid until he was reprimanded by the superior.

== Cast ==
- Shaheizy Sam as Din/Grenggo
- Fezrul Khan as Ayoi
- Farid Kamil as Detective Farid
- Epy Kodiang as Corporal Aepul
- Emily Chan as Mimi
- Along Eyzendy as Murad
- Adam Corrie as Brenggo
- Mohd Noor Bon as Dato' Jamal
- Mandy Chong as Datin Salmah
- Riezman Khuzaimi as Chief of police
- Zalif Sidek as Zaki
- Faith Zakie as Shiela
