= Pekin Ibrahim =

Malaysian actor, director, screenwriter, producer and singer

- بكين إبراهيم
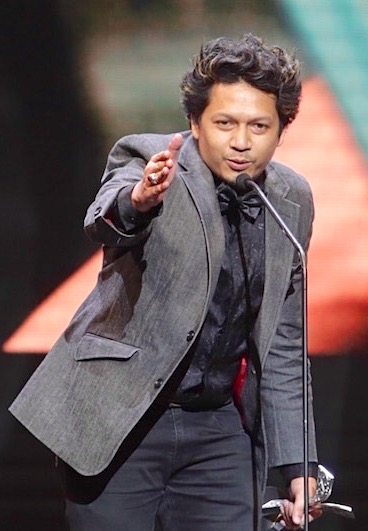
- Pekin at the 28th Malaysia Film Festival in 2016
- Born: Mohd Iznan bin Ibrahim; 25 October 1981 (age 44); Kota Bharu, Kelantan, Malaysia
- Education: Universiti Utara Malaysia (UUM)
- Occupations: Actor, director, screenwriter, producer
- Years active: 2002–present
- Spouse: Mona Allen (m. 2018)
- Children: 2

Mohd Iznan "Pekin" Ibrahim (born 25 October 1981) is a Malaysian actor. He is best known for his roles in the critically acclaimed film Bunohan (2012), Hantu Kak Limah Balik Rumah (2010), Apokalips X, Ophilia (both in 2014), Munafik and Mat Moto (both in 2016); the last film won him the Malaysia Film Festival award for the Best Actor category, beating other nominees like Shaheizy Sam, Zizan Razak, and Aaron Aziz.

== Early life ==
The youngest child from six siblings, Pekin was born on 25 October 1981 in Kota Bharu, Kelantan to parents Che Jah Che Mat and Ibrahim Awang. His father died of a heart attack when he was 11. His first job was as a worker at an A&W restaurant in Subang Jaya after he left his hometown with his best friend, Danny Anwa from Malaysian boy band, X-Factor at the age of 16 to start a new life in Kuala Lumpur. While he was working at the restaurant, he attended several auditions for roles in dramas and movies. He also worked very hard to master English and hide his thick Kelantanese accent.

== Career ==
Pekin started his career as a supporting actor, his first movie being Di Ambang Misteri directed by Silver Chung in 2004 and then Cinta Terakhir directed by Along Kamaludin. In 2009, he was offered to play a supporting role in a horror film called Skrip 7707 directed by Abdul Razak Mohaideen.

Pekin rose to fame as he joined the cast of the horror comedy film Hantu Kak Limah Balik Rumah (2010) directed by Mamat Khalid. In 2012, he played Bakar in Bunohan directed by Dain Iskandar Said. His Kelantanese origins were a convenience to his character who is supposed to speak in the dialect of the state Bunohan was set in.

In 2013, he had been offered once again by Mamat Khalid to play a role as a main actor in his new comedy film called Rock Ooo and then later Apokalips X. He then played a big part in the thriller film Ophilia (2014) directed by Raja Mukhriz Raja Ahmad Kamaluddin as one of the members in a skinhead group.

In 2015, he played a role as a main character in Villa Nabila, a horror movie directed by Syafiq Yusof. In 2016, Pekin was offered by Syamsul Yusof to play a role in Munafik as a main actor. The movie managed to earn about RM 19 million (RM17 million domestic plus RM2 million in neighbouring countries) in just 2 months. In 2016, Pekin ventured into film directing career with films Mat Moto and Volkswagen Kuning, the former winning him three awards at 28th Malaysia Film Festival including Best Original Story, Best New Actress for Falisha Crossley, and Best Actor via Pekin himself. After his win in the 2016 Malaysia Film Festival, he said:

Mat Moto means a lot to me because it's close to my heart and it's my first directorial project. Also, I never expected that my character can win even though it was hard to play, but it's not so heavy. In terms of emotion, I think there are other heavier characters out there. This is my first Malaysia Film Festival win since being in the industry for more than 20 years. It is also my second nomination as my first was in 2012 for Malaysia Film Festival 25 for the film, Bunohan.

== Personal life ==
Pekin married actress Mona Allen on 7 December 2018.

On 31 August 2022, they welcomed their first child, a son named Petra Pekin.

== Filmography ==
=== Film ===
Year	Title	Role	Notes
2004	Di Ambang Misteri	Vic	Debut film appearances
2004	Bicara Hati	Shahrul	
2009	Cinta Terakhir	Cat Farish	
2009	Skrip 7707	Young Burn	
2010	Hantu Kak Limah Balik Rumah	Musalman	
2011	...Dalam Botol	Taxi Driver	
2011	Al Hijab	Horror Movie Cast	
2012	Bunohan	Bakar	
2013	Pada Suatu Cinta Dahulu	Artist	
2013	Rock Ooo	Slash / Wan Sulaiman	
2013	Cerita Kita	Kamal	
2013	Paku Pontianak	Adam	
2013	Lagenda Budak Hostel	Aeron	
2013	Paku	Hadi	
2013	Tokan	Yusof	
2014	Still Life	Gallery Security Guard	As director
2014	Apokalips X	Lipan	
2014	Ophilia	Uji	
2015	Rumah Pusaka Disimpang Jalan	Rashid/Datuk Semerah Setongkol Jagung	
2015	Villa Nabila	Asyraf	
2015	Coverina	Kamal	
2015	Jejak Warriors	Wan Hassan	
2015	Juvana 2: Terperangkap Dalam Kebebasan	Tok Ki	
2016	Mat Moto	Al	As director and screenwriter
2016	Munafik	Fazil	
2016	Kampung Drift	Acai	
2016	Lalu		Short film
2016	Pagari Bulan	—	Short film, as producer
2016	Volkswagen Kuning	Fuad	
2016	Rock Bro!	Slash/Wan Sulaiman	
2016	Juvana 3: Perhitungan Terakhir	Tok Ki	
2016	Desolasi	Zahid	
2017	Lebuhraya Ke Neraka	Medical Assistants	
2017	KL Wangan	Ejay	As director, producer and screenwriter
2018	Surf This Love: Gelora Juara	Jimmy John	
2018	Hantu Kak Limah	Musalman	
2018	7ujuh	Mus	
2019	Suatu Ketika	Teacher Sulaiman	
2020	Rock 4: Rockers Never Dai	Slash	
2020	Manap Karaoke	Rauf Bogiba	
2021	Salina	Rizal	
2021	Belaban Hidup: Infeksi Zombie	SWAT	
2022	Gila Gusti	Jiggy	
2022	Tujuh Hari Di Bawah Matahari	Ali	Short film
2022	Juang	Staf Hospital	
2023	Maryam Pergi Ke Malam		
2023	Imaginur	Haikal	
2023	Cerana Biduk Bu Merah	Imran	
2023	Adiwiraku 2: The Gemencheh Boys	Teacher Azman	
2024	Janna Endoro	Mat Dat	
2024	SyurgaKu	Officemate	Short film, as director
2025	Kulit Wayang	Pak Wana	

=== Television series ===
Year	Title	Role	TV channel	Notes
2004	Cinta Tsunami		TV3	
2004	Kisah Benar (Season 23)	Rahman	TV3	Episode: "Terleka"
2006	Janji Diana	Sam	TV2	
2008	Antologi Cinta Buat Rania		TV1	
2009	Nenek Kebaya	Hazami	TV3	
2009	Keliwon (Season 2)	Syah	TV3	Episode: "Bidan Jembalang"
2010	Pintu Taubat		Astro Oasis	Episode: "Ragutan Maut"
2014	Tanah Kubur (Season 8)	Husin	Astro Oasis	Episode: "Dosa Susu"
2014	Kalau Itu Jodoh Kita		TV Alhijrah	
2014	Seludup	Amran	Astro Prima	
2014	Kifarah (Season 2)		TV3	Episode: "Kelentong"
2015	Siri Bercakap Dengan Jin (Season 1)		Astro Mustika HD	
2015	Kifarah Mistik		TV3	Episode: "Gelandangan"
2021	Keluarga Untuk Disewa	Din	TV9	

=== Theater ===
Year	Title	Role	Ref.
2012	Tattoo Gestapo	Mustafa	
2017	Cinta Pertama The Musical		
2017	Dendam Laksamana		

=== Telemovie ===
Year	Title	Role	TV channel	Notes
2002	Pendekar: The Movie	Iskandar	VCD	
2002	Momok 2	Ali	VCD	
2003	Maximum	Pekin	TV3	
2004	Zon 606	Pitt	VCD	
2005	Ombak Laut China Selatan		Astro Ria	
2006	Gadis Melayu	Wan Deraman	TV3	
2013	Tarbiah Toyib		Astro Oasis	
2013	Mengejar Neraka	Fahkri	TV2	
2013	Cerita Sebenar Mengenai Bibah	Hazril	TV9	
2014	Abu	Fauzi	TV2	
2014	Saya Sabar	Sabar	TV Alhijrah	
2014	Hitam	Puteh	TV3	
2014	Bejat	Hamzah	TV2	
2014	Balqis	Yamin	TV3	
2014	Migrasi		TV9	
2015	Hujan Pagi	Idrus	Astro Prima	
2015	Adelia	Faris	TV2	
2015	Misteri Ubi Kayu		TV2	
2016	Fatin		TV3	
2016	Batas	Izad	TV2	
2016	Karya 12: Wau Kasih	Sani	Astro Citra	
2017	Bayangan Emilia	Rizal	Astro Ria	As director and screenwriter
2017	Karya 12 Vol 2: Semerah Darah	Khairul	Astro Citra	
2018	Perahu Kecil	Jamil	TV1	
2018	Manikam Hati		TV3	
2019	Abang! Adik Patah Balik		TV2	
2019	Hassan Turbo	Hassan Turbo	TV3	
2020	Jihad Ramadan	Hasan	TV3	
2020	Sunah Terakhir	Nordin	TV2	
2020	Tuan Petri Saadong	Raja Abdullah	Astro Citra	
2020	B.O.B (Bukan Orang Buta)	Wahid	Awesome TV	
2021	Mr Drift	Ady	Astro Citra	
2022	Yang Soleh	—	TV2	As director
2022	Jodoh Buat Mia	Helmi	TV Okey	

== Discography ==
Year	Song title	Artist	Ref.
2017	"KL Wangan"	Pekin Ibrahim, Altimet & Faizal Hussein	

== Awards and nominations ==
Year	Award	Category	Work(s)	Result
2012	Men of the Year	Film	—N/a	Won
2012	24th Malaysian Film Festival	Best Actor	Bunohan	Nominated
2014	2014 Anugerah Skrin	Best Actor (Drama)	Balqis	Nominated
2016	28th Malaysian Film Festival	Best Actor	Mat Moto	Won
2016	28th Malaysian Film Festival	Promising Director	Mat Moto	Nominated
2016	28th Malaysian Film Festival	Best Screenplay	Mat Moto	Nominated
2016	28th Malaysian Film Festival	Best Original Story	Mat Moto	Won
