= Apokalips X =

- Directed by: Mamat Khalid
- Written by: Mamat Khalid
- Produced by: Gayatri Su-Lin Pillai
- Starring: Farid Kamil; Jehan Miskin; Peter Davis; Zoie Tam; Miera Leyana; Iqram Dinzly
- Cinematography: Raja Mukhriz Bin Raja Ahmad Kamaruddin
- Edited by: Zaffa Khalid; Amen Khalid
- Music by: Reza Ramsey
- Production companies: Tayangan Unggul Sdn Bhd; Naga VXS
- Distributed by: Astro Shaw
- Release date: 3 April 2014 (Malaysia)
- Running time: 100 minutes
- Country: Malaysia
- Languages: Malay; English
- Budget: MYR 1.5 million
- Box office: MYR 253,446

Apokalips X (English: Apocalypse X) is a 2014 Malaysian Malay-language post-apocalyptic action film directed and written by Mamat Khalid.

== Synopsis ==
Apocalypse X tells the story of a human civilization that lives after a Nuclear War breaks out in 2047. The remnants of humanity that survived the war live in chaos, lost their purpose and become violent. Then, several clans appeared that argued and killed each other for survival and the title of leader. Humans are currently divided into five factions namely Merah Putih led by X (Farid Kamil), Taring Led led by Sri Gala (Peter Davis), Flora led by Kulat (Zoee Tan), Lotus led by Melur (Vasanth) and Jingking led by Y (Jehan Poor) of the 30 tribes originally.

The tribes tried to establish peace through a peace agreement founded by the Reverend despite the existence of resentment and hatred between them. X, who was feared in his former glory, was determined not to fight again until any time. But the peace agreement that had stopped the deadly battle once before became more and more threatened when Aman Chai (Adam), X's main follower fell in love with Sri Gala's beloved daughter QiQi (Miera Leyana). The fight that broke out as a result of the love affair and Kala's incitement caused QiQi to be seriously injured. Sri Gala who was inflamed by the incident was determined to get out of the peace agreement that had been signed for years.

As the tension between X and Sri Gala escalates, the power-mad Kala takes advantage by planning his actions to bring down the two gangs. Kala managed to increase the number of followers while preparing to attack.

== Cast ==
- Farid Kamil as X
- Jehan Miskin as Kala / Y
- Adam AF as Aman Chai
- Miera Leyana as QiQi
- Dazrin Kamarudin as Chin Long
- Iqram Dinzly as Razor
- Pekin Ibrahim as Lipan
- Vasantha Kumaran as Melur
- Zoee Tan as Kulat
- Peter Davis as Sri Gala
- Dayana Roza as Kunyit
- Pyan Habib as Pendita (special appearance)
- Sarimah Ibrahim as Zara (special appearance)
- Zaffa Khalid as Sawan
- Adam Khalid as Balung
- Amen Khalid as Amen
- Azwan Anuar as Pipit
- Aris Yanin as Alam
- Haswany Osmar as Kangkong
- Amira Izzati as Kobis
- Hassanah Mohamad as Baby
- Lee Weng Seng as Monster
- Idriss Ahmad as Kerengga
- Faris Farid as Sengat
- XY Zakaria as XY
- Henzi Andalas as Ah Seng
- Ayez Shaukat as Sengat
