= Ramlee Awang Murshid =

Malaysian author (born 1967)

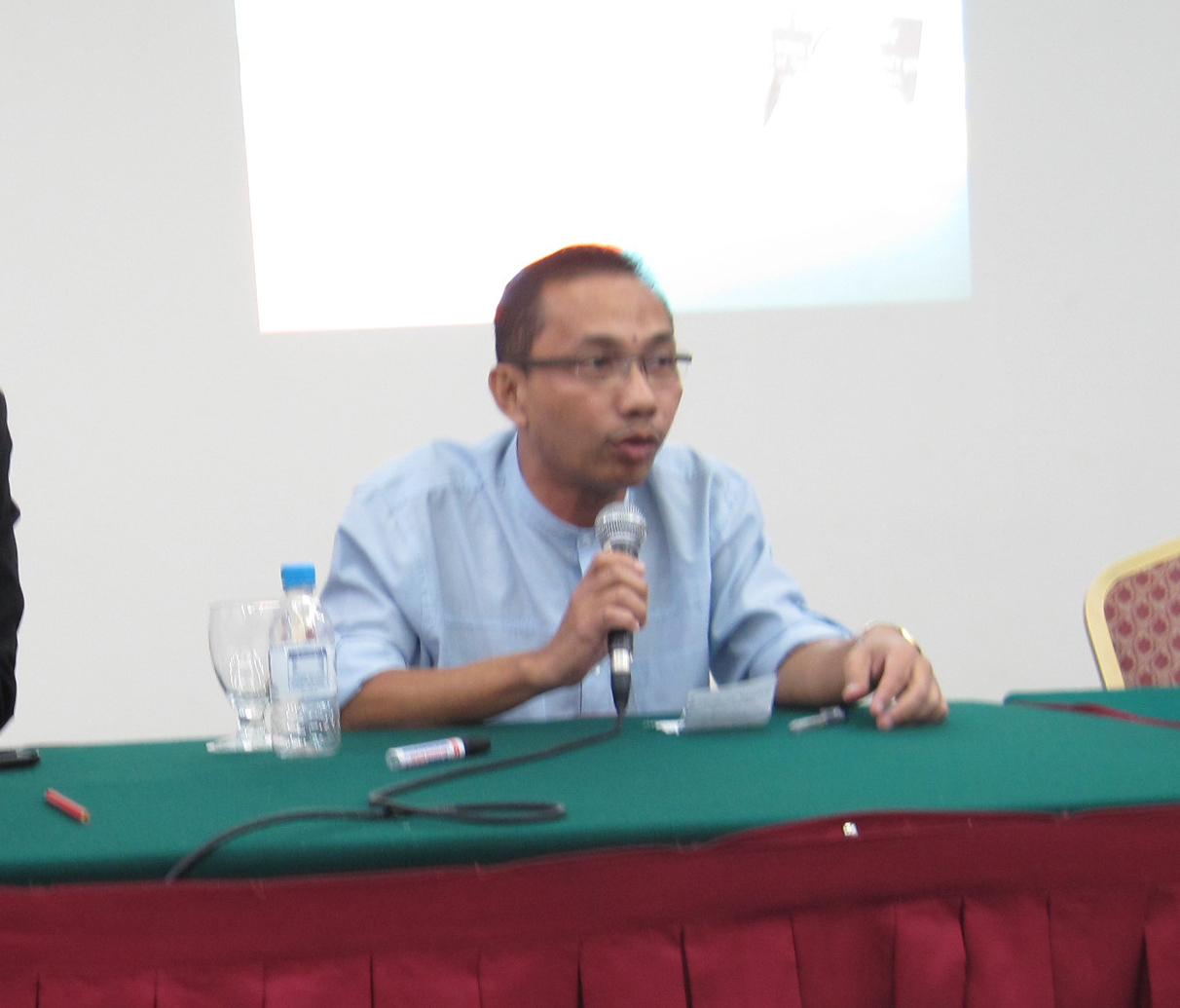
- Born: 4 November 1967 (age 58); Papar, Sabah, Malaysia
- Education: B.A., (Mass Communication)
- Alma mater: Universiti Kebangsaan Malaysia (2000)
- Occupations: Writer, columnist
- Spouse: Dayang Aminah Datuk Aliudin (m. 1990)
- Children: Muhammad Aizuddin
- Writing career
- Period: 1995-present
- Genre: Novel
- Website: kelabram.com

Ramlee Awang Murshid (born 4 November 1967, in Papar, Malaysia) is a Malaysian novelist of Bruneian Malay descent.

== Life and career ==
He attended the Kapayan Primary School in Kota Kinabalu from 1974 to 1979 for his primary education and later graduated from Sabah College also located in Kota Kinabalu, in 1984, where he furthered his secondary education. He later furthered his tertiary studies at the National University of Malaysia, where he obtained his Certificate of Communication in 2000 as well as his Bachelor of Arts (honours) degree in Communications.

He had involved himself in theatre since his teenage years, at times as a director, playwright or actor. He was also a former reporter for Radio Televisyen Malaysia spanning 20 years from 1986 to 2010. His reporting job, which sometimes brought him to travel to various countries, played a significant role in his writing. Some of those works, which are set in faraway countries such as Japan, were inspired by his travels.

== Personal life ==
He is married to Dayang Aminah Datuk Aliudin since 14 February 1990. They have one child together named Muhammad Aizuddin Haiqal.

== Awards ==
- First runner for his novel Igauan Maut (1995) in Adult Novel Writing, hosted by Dewan Bahasa dan Pustaka, Kota Kinabalu branch.
- Sabah Literature Award 1995/1996 from his novel Igauan Maut
- First runner up for Pei Pan novel, hosted by Sako Novel National Award 2002.
- Sabah Literature Award 2004/2005 via novel Pei Pan
- Sabah Literature Award 2006/2007 via novel Bagaikan Puteri (Like a princess)
- Berita Harian Reader's Favourite Book Award 2009 via novel Hijab Sang Pencinta (2nd Runner Up)

== Works ==
No.	Year	Title	Publisher	Notes
01	1995	Igauan Maut	Dewan Bahasa dan Pustaka	published by RAM typewriter (RAMFC store)
02	1998	Tombiruo	Alaf 21	film: Tombiruo: Penunggu Rimba
03	1999	Ranggau	Alaf 21	
04	2000	Anugerah Pertama	Creative Enterprise	No longer published
05	2000	Mandatori	Alaf 21	
06	2001	Semangat Hutan	Alaf 21	
07	2002	Pei Pan	UPDSB	
08	2002	ADAM	Alaf 21	
09	2003	Satu Janji	Alaf 21	
10	2004	Tombiruo Terakhir	Alaf 21	
11	2005	Rahsia Perindu	Alaf 21	
12	2005	Bagaikan Puteri	Alaf 21	
13	2006	Hatiku Di Harajuku	Alaf 21	
14	2007	Cinta Sang Ratu	Alaf 21	
15	2008	Ungu Karmila	Alaf 21	
16	2008	Hijab Sang Pencinta	Alaf 21	
17	2008	Personal Justice	Alaf 21	English translation of ADAM
18	2009	Mikhail	Alaf 21	
19	2010	9 Nyawa	Alaf 21	
20	2010	Cinta Sufi	Alaf 21	
21	2011	Rayyan Fantasi	Alaf 21	
22	2011	Sutera Bidadari	Karangkraf	
23	2011	Fiksyen 302	Karangkraf	
24	2012	Sunan Musafir	Karangkraf	
25	2013	Aku Bercerita	Karangkraf	
26	2013	Magis	Karangkraf	
27	2014	Sunan Nanggroe	Karangkraf	
28	2014	Raudhah	Karangkraf	As part of the Jiwa Kacau 2 : Gaun Berdarah anthology
29	2014	Mitos	RAMFC	Originally released as a series every Saturday on Berita Harian in 2013
30	2014	Raudhah	Karangkraf	
31	2015	Tetamu Siang	Karangkraf	A part of the Jembalang anthology
32	2015	Sunan Cinta Nan Sakti	Karangkraf	
33	2016	Imaginasi	Karangkraf	
34	2017	Anding Ayangan	Buku Prima	
35	2018	Legasi Tombiruo	Buku Prima	

=== Adaptations of works ===
A film adaptation of one of Ramlee's more famous works, Tombiruo: Penunggu Rimba, was co-produced by Astro Shaw, book publisher Karangkraf, Ideate Media and Ramlee's own production company Layar Sunan. The film was released to cinemas on 16 October 2017. The four companies are also in the process of making a film adaptation of another work titled Bagaikan Puteri, a historical fiction novel surrounding a young lady who is flung into the 15th century and ends up falling for an admiral of the Aceh Sultanate.

The thriller novel Mandatori was made into a 6-part miniseries as an exclusive release on Malaysian satellite TV provider Astro's on-demand service Astro First late 2017.

== Sources ==
- http://www.kelabram.com/
