= Mimi Lana =

Malaysian actress and model

- ميمي لان
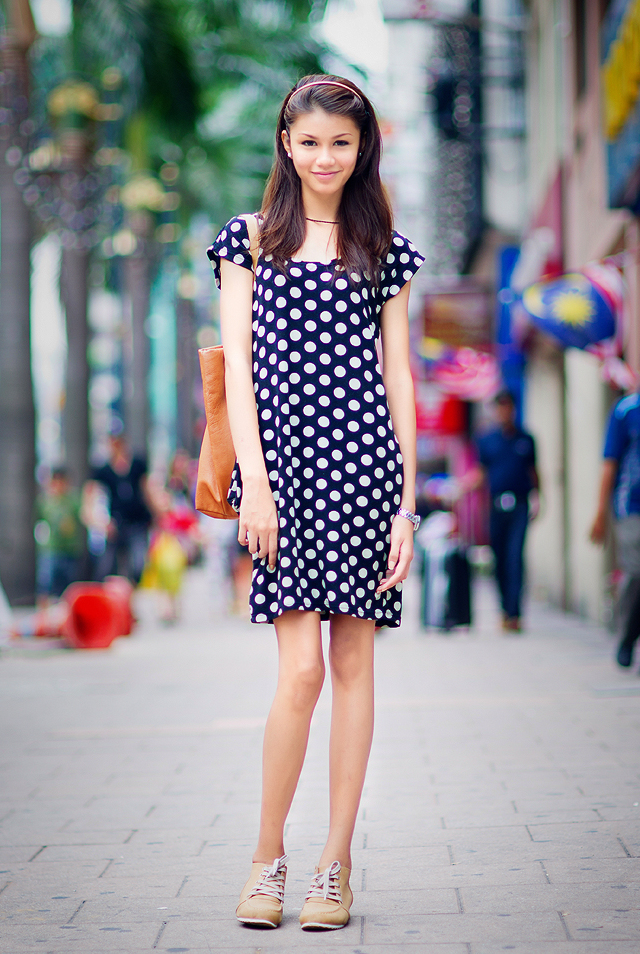
- Mimi Lana in August 2012.
- Born: Mimi Rozaiana binti Zainal Abidin; 21 November 1995 (age 30); Taiping, Perak, Malaysia
- Education: Malaysian Certificate of Education (SPM)
- Occupations: Actor; Model
- Years active: 2013–present
- Spouse: Syafiq Kyle (m. 2025)

Mimi Rozaiana Zainal Abidin (born 21 November 1995) or better known as Mimi Lana (Jawi: ميمي لان) is a Malaysian actress and model. Her career began after becoming one of the participants of Dewi Remaja 2014/2015. Since then, she has starred in several television dramas including Ku Tinggalkan Cinta Di Okinawa (2015), Sein dan Luna (2016), Halalkan Hati Yang Ku Curi (2018), Masih Ada Rindu (2021) and Framed (Malaysian series) (2024). Mimi Lana played in films like Pusaka (2019), Saka Nan Sepi (2020), The Experts (2024) and Mencari Ramlee (2025).

== Career ==
Inheriting the field of acting from his grandmother who was a stage actress during the heyday of Seniman Agung, P. Ramlee, Mimi Lana started her modeling career as one of the participants of Dewi Remaja 2014/2015 together with Raysha Rizrose, Mawar Rashid, Syamim Farid, Natrah Khalid, Fify Azmi and Puteri Aishah and later became involved in acting. She first became known after acting in the drama Sein Dan Luna as the main character with Syazuwan Hassan.

Mimi made her debut on the big screen through the film Pusaka (2019). In 2020, Mimi starred in two dramas, namely Chandelier as Keisha Edlina and Hati Yang Tersakiti as Farah Azira.

She acted with Farid Kamil in the drama Masih Ada Rindu (2021) which was broadcast on Akasia slot TV3 by playing the role of Syafika.

In 2022, she acted in the drama Villa Kristal to be broadcast on WeTV starting March 4. It also stars Jasmine Suraya Chin, Tiz Zaqyah and Mawar Rashid.

== Personal life ==
Mimi along with actresses Natasha Elyzza and Fivi Mae were arrested after their residence in Subang Jaya, Selangor, was raided by the police on 18 September 2015. During the raid, police found a bag containing three transparent plastic packets containing marijuana weighing 15.74 grams and a knife blade on the dresser in the second room of their residence. She was jailed for 11 days. Mimi was released on 29 September after investigations found that the drugs did not belong to her.

She shared about her height in an interview with Star2: "Everyone in my family is tall. My father and my brother are taller than 6 feet (1.8m). My brother, is also tall like me." According to a Star2 report, Mimi appears to be taller than most Malaysian women.

In June 2020, Mimi revealed that her relationship with actor Syafiq Kyle had ended after five years of dating. However, their relationship was rekindled after sharing pictures of each other on social media.

Mimi and Syafiq tied the knot in January 2023, and were scheduled to get married on 18 August 2023, but they called off their wedding at the time end. However, the couple was finally married on 14 February 2025 and legally became husband and wife, with one word.

== Filmography ==
=== Films ===
Year	Title	Character	Notes
2017	Balun	Girl	First film, supporting actor
2019	Pusaka	Nur	
2020	Saka Nan Sepi	Rozi	
2023	Seindah Kasih The Movie	Alia	
2024	The Experts Selamatkan Raya	Emma	Short film
2024	The Experts	Emma	
2025	Mencari Ramlee	Yasmin	
2026	Polong	Fatima	
2026	Mojoku Hilang	Ayu	
2026	Munajat Kekasih	Qistina Dezek	Post-production
2027	Takluk 2: Ops Daulat		In production

=== Drama ===
Year	Title	Character	TV channels	Note
2013	Kisah Cinta	Friend Huzir	TV3	The first drama
2013	Cinta Jannah	Wanda	TV3	
2013	Aku	Yana	TV3	
2015	Papa Chef	Still	TV1	
2015	Eksperimen Cinta	Melissa	TV3	
2015	Mencari Mubarak	Wan Zaidi	TV1	
2015	Ku Tinggalkan Cinta Di Okinawa	Riana	Astro Mustika HD	
2016	Sekali Aku Jatuh Cinta	Izzati	TV3	
2016	Sein And Luna	Luna	TV3	
2017	Cinta Samar	Sofia	TV1	
2018	Suamiku Mat Piun	Atiqah	TV3	
2018	Halalkan Hati Yang Ku Curi	Salima	TV3	
2018	Cinta Koko Coklat	Darwina	ntv7	
2018	Mawar Murni	Mawar	TV3	
2018	Dian	Syafiqa	NTV7	
2019	Cari Aku Di Syurga	Mira	TV3	
2019	Bukan Cinta Aku	Qisha	TV3	
2020	Chandelier	Keisha Edlina	Astro Ria	
2020	Hati Yang Tersakiti	Farah Azira	TV3	
2021	Ramadan Pertama Edi	Nad	Astro Ria	
2021	Masih Ada Rindu	Syafika	TV3	
2021	Lockdown	Milia	Astro Ria	
2022	Akim & Mira - Kisah Vinta 1999	Mira	Astro Ria	
2023	Persepsi	Dayah	Astro Ria	
2024	Framed	Lia	Astro Premier	
2024	Andai Tiada Dia	Intan	Astro Ria	then replaced by Alicia Amin starting episode 29
2025	First Wives: Sisters Before Misters	Diyana	Astro Citra	

=== Telefilm ===
Year	Title	Character	TV Channel
2014	Aidil Click	Adik Rizal	TVi
2015	Kek Batik Cheese Leleh	Atira	TV9
2016	Air Mata Xinjiang		TV2
2016	Cinta Viral	Mell	TV1
2017	Hanya NamaMu	Ayu	TV3
2017	Fatihah Untuk Mama	Fatihah	TV3
2017	Dodol Untuk Menantu	Noni	TV9
2017	Menantu Second Class	Fatin	TV9
2017	Opah Dot Com	Lydia	TV9
2017	Gadis Kosmos	Lily	Astro Citra
2018	The Hantus	Cinta	Astro First Exclusive
2018	Maya Mila	Maya/Mila	ntv7
2018	Wish List Raya	Alia	TV9
2018	Selirat	Huda	TV3
2018	Terlakur Cinta Suci	Aleyna	TV3
2018	Neraka Kasih Maisarah	Maisarah	TV3
2018	Kau, Aku, Hantu Raya	Fifie	TV2
2019	Viral Alam Maya	Intan	TV3
2019	Dulang Boy	Rosyatimah	TV3
2019	Sahur Terakhir	Adik Zamani	TV Okey
2019	7 Netizen	Nadia	Astro Citra
2020	Ara	Ara	TV3
2020	Racun Suami Jahanam	Suraya	Astro Citra
2021	Bukan Cerita Cinta Cliche	Emmel	Astro Citra
2021	"Mufariq"		TV1

=== Web drama ===
Year	Title	Character	Network
2015	Dan Calonnya Adalah (Season 2)	Yasmin	tonton
2016	"Cinta Tangkap Muat"	Emilia	Unifi TV
2017	"Ana Kleopatrena"	Ana	Unifi TV
2021	Realiti Cinta	Andrea	WeTV
2022	"Villa Kristal"	Hani	WeTV
2023	Perempuan Itu	Khalish	tonton
2024	Perempuan Paling Merana	Saleha	tonton

=== Television ===
Year	Title	Role	TV Channel
2014–2015	Dewi Remaja	Participant	Astro Ria
2017	Ketuk-Ketuk Ramadan	Guest artist	TV1
2020	MeleTOP	Guest host	Astro Ria

== Awards and nominations ==
Year	Award	Category	Nomination	Results
2019	23rd Screen Awards	Best Actress in a Drama	Neraka Kasih Maisarah	Nominated
2020	33rd Daily News Popular Star Awards	Popular Film Matching Pairing (with Syafiq Kyle)	Pusaka	Won
2021	31st Malaysian Film Festival	Most Promising Female Actress	Pusaka	Nominated
