= Broken Heaven =

- Genre: Religion
- Written by: Eirma Fatima
- Directed by: Pali Yahya
- Starring: Faizal Hussein; Fattah Amin; Riena Diana; Marissa Yasmin; Vanida Imran; Hasnul Rahmat; Fazlina Ahmad Daud; Nur Fathia Latiff; Malia Baby; Nafiz Muaz; Hanna Faresha; Bibi Qairina; Iman Zulkarnain
- Country of origin: Malaysia
- Original language: Malay
- No. of episodes: 15

Production
- Executive producer: Eirma Fatima
- Producer: Ahmad Arri Abdullah
- Running time: 42 minutes
- Production company: Rumah Karya Citra Sdn Bhd

Original release
- Network: Viu
- Release: 6 March – 5 April 2025

Broken Heaven (Malay: Bidaah) is a 2025 Malaysian web series that premiered on Viu from 6 March to 5 April 2025. Directed by Pali Yahya and produced by Rumah Karya Citra Sdn. Bhd., the series stars Faizal Hussein, Fattah Amin, Riena Diana, Vanidah Imran, Hasnul Rahmat, Marissa Yasmin, Fathia Latiff, and Malia Baby. Broken Heaven explores themes of faith, devotion, and the dangers of religious extremism.

== Synopsis ==
When faith is twisted and devotion is blind, one girl risks everything to save her mother from a deviant sect.

The series centers on Baiduri (Riena Diana), a young woman coerced by her devout mother, Kalsum (Fazlina Ahmad Daud) into joining Jihad Ummah, a religious sect led by the enigmatic Walid Muhammad (Faizal Hussein).

As Baiduri becomes increasingly involved, she uncovers disturbing practices hidden beneath the group’s spiritual facade—forced marriages, unquestioned obedience, and controversial rituals.

The return of Hambali (Fattah Amin), the son of Walid's second-in-command, from Yemen marks a turning point. Disillusioned by what the sect has become, Hambali allies with Baiduri in a courageous attempt to expose the truth and rescue those caught in the sect’s grip—including her mother. Together, they confront the cult’s leadership, risking everything for justice and freedom.

== Cast ==
=== Main ===
- Faizal Hussein as Walid Muhammad Mahdi Ilman
- Fattah Amin as Hambali
- Riena Diana as Baiduri
- Marissa Yasmin as Ummi Hafizah
- Vanidah Imran as Ummi Rabiatul
- Hasnul Rahmat as Abi Saifullah
- Fazlina Ahmad Daud as Kalsum
- Nur Fathia Latiff as Masyitah

=== Supporting ===
- Malia Baby as Habibah
- Shazia Rozaini as Mia
- Nafiz Muaz as Rizqi
- Hanna Faresha as Asyikin
- Bibi Qairina as Fatin
- Iman Zulkarnain as Jalil

== Production ==
Broken Heaven is produced by Rumah Karya Citra and directed by Pali Yahya. Filmed in Malaysia, the series tackles sensitive and timely social issues, particularly around religious manipulation and personal agency. The show combines dramatic storytelling with social commentary, aiming to spark conversations about spiritual abuse and freedom of belief.

== Release ==
Broken Heaven was released on Viu, where it became one of the most-streamed Malaysian web dramas of 2025 with episodes premiering weekly from 6 March to 5 April 2025.
