= Hafidz Roshdi =

South Korean-Malaysian actor

- Born: Muhammad Hafidz bin Roshdi; November 13, 1994 (age 31); Shah Alam, Malaysia
- Other names: Hafidz
- Occupations: Actor, model
- Years active: 2012–present
- Height: 1.73 m (5 ft 8 in)
- Spouses: Nurul Shuhada Mat Shukri (m. 2016; div. 2023) Athira Yuhada (m. 2023)
- Children: 2

Muhammad Hafidz bin Roshdi (born 13 November 1994) is a Malaysian actor and model. He is a former contestant of Hero Remaja 2011/12 with Fattah Amin, Syafiq Kyle and Saharul Ridzwan.

== Early life ==
Hafidz Roshdi was born on 13 November 1994, in Shah Alam, Malaysia. He is the eldest child of four siblings two young brothers and has one young sister.

== Career ==
His participation in the competition made Hafidz the youngest contestant in Hero Remaja 2013/14.

== Filmography ==
=== Film ===
Year	Title	Role	Notes
2018	Makrifat Cinta	Himself	Cameo in magazine, uncredited
2019	Pusaka	Luqman	
2022	Juang	Medical Officer 2	

=== TV series ===
Year	Title	Role	TV Network	Notes
2014	Baby Ana Milik Siapa?	Edry	TV3	
2015	Tabir Zulaikha	Johan	TV3	
2015	Wadi	Cikgu Hanafi	TV3	
2015	Kau Aku Kita	Fakhrul Syeen	TV3	
2015	Aku Pilih Kamu	Rizman	TV3	
2015	Ya Solihin	Solihin	TV2	
2015	Tanah Kubur (Season 14)	Muhammad	Astro Oasis	Episode: "Jihad Samurah bin Jundur"
2016	Tundukkan Playboy Itu	Harraz Naufal	TV3	
2016	Hajah Heathrow Kembali	Razali	TV3	
2016	Mr. Donat Karamel	Faiq Faiqal	TV3	
2017	Seharum Mawar	Farhan Hakimi	TV1	
2017	Baitul Rahmat	Ustaz Safuan	TV1	
2017	Kias Ramadhan	Faiz/Boy	TV3	Episode: "Sepatu Saiz 10"
2017	Kisah Dari Mekah	Imran	Astro Oasis	Episode: "Aku Jumpa Siapa?"
2017	Raisha	Fuad	TV3	
2017	Red Velvet	Fareeq	Astro Ria	
2018	Papa Nak Menantu	Azrin Aidil	TV3	
2018	Kelip-Kelip Di Kota London	Syed Syaufiq	TV3	
2018	Doa Ku Mohon	Aiman	TV3	
2018	Ahmad Rosli Arwahkan Ketua Kampung	Ahmad Rosli	TV3	
2018	Cinta Tiada Ganti	Nazrim	Astro Prima	
2018	Solat: Dekatkan Kami DenganMu	Fauzi	TV3	
2018	Jawatankuasa Kampung Kalut (J.K.K.)	Remy	TV3	Episode: "Mencari Rezeki"
2018	Raisha 2	Fuad	TV3	
2018	Kan Kukejar Cinta Kamu	Huzail	Astro Ria	
2019	Cinta Tanpa Henti	Saiful	TV3	
2019	Calon Menantu Tuan Rumah	Adam	TV Okey	
2019	Manuskrip Cinta	Dr. Rian Akasyah	TV1	
2020	Camelia	Dr. Azman	TV3	
2020	Dia Bidadari Dari Syurga	Raff	TV Okey	
2021	Melastik Ke Hatimu	Naim Johari	TV3	
2021	Rahimah Tanpa Rahim	Adli	TV3	
2021	Dia Isteriku	Helmi	TV Alhijrah	
2021	Perisik Cinta Tak Diundang	Firas Akhtar	TV3	
2022	Harith Fayyadh	Harith	TV3	
2022	Bisik-Bisik Gelora	Wari	TV3	
2022	Jesnita	Aidil	Astro Prima	
2022	Ku Punya Hati	Rezza	TV3	
2022	Melastik Ke Hatimu 2	Naim Johari	TV3	

=== Telemovies ===
Year	Title	Role	TV Network
2012	Anak Ikan	Hafidz	Astro Prima
2015	Perangkap Perkahwinan	Fitri	Astro Prima
2015	Hajah Heathrow	Razali	TV3
2016	Ayah Mentuaku	Hakimi	TV9
2016	Kau Aku Kita Raya	Fakhrul Syeen	TV3
2016	Sabotaj	Syarul	TV1
2017	Jalan Balik Surau	Maman	TV3
2017	Bawa Aku Ke Syurga	Nizam	TV9
2018	Kembalikan Sinarnya	Ustaz Zahir	TV3
2019	Viral Alam Maya	Hazmin	TV3
2019	Siti Selfie	Jamal	TV2
2020	Ara	Taufiq	TV3
2021	Najiha	Ridzwan	TV2

=== Theatre ===
Year	Title	Role
2016	Lela Manja	Raja Muda Tengku Dewa

=== Web series ===
Year	Title	Role	Network
2018	KOPI: Kopi Julia	Ikram	Tonton

=== Advertisement ===
Year	Title	Notes
2015	Petronas Raya Sampai Hati	with Beto Kusyairy
2016	Syukur Selalu F&N	with Janna Nick

== Awards and nominations ==
Year	Award	Category	Nominated work	Result
2017	4th Kuala Lumpur Drama Festival Awards	Choice Actor Award	Mr. Donat Karamel	Nominated
2017	4th Kuala Lumpur Drama Festival Awards	Choice Couple Award (with Azira Shafinaz)	Mr. Donat Karamel	Nominated
