= Mia Ahmad =

Malaysian actress and model

- ميا أحمد
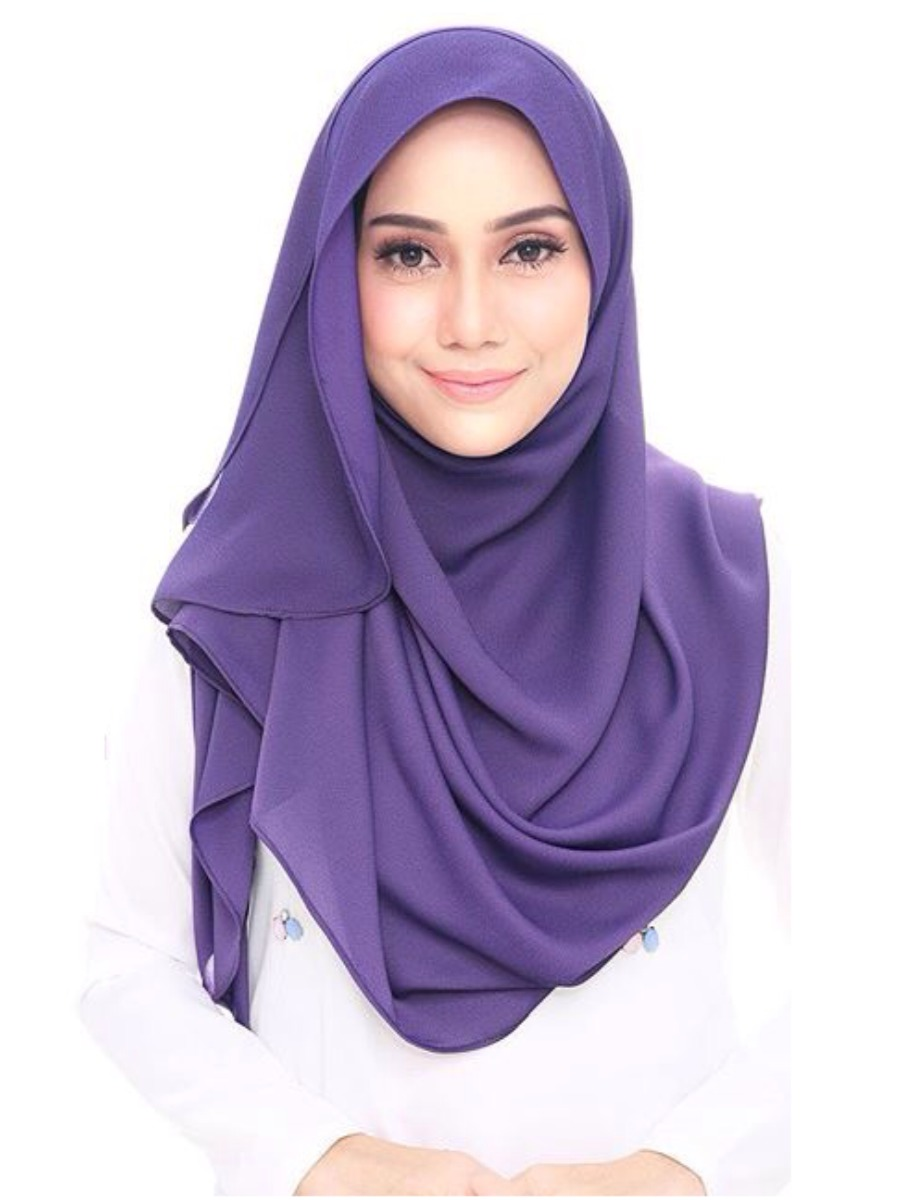
- Born: Samihah binti Ahmad Baderi; 22 February 1988 (age 38); Taiping, Perak, Malaysia
- Occupations: Actress, Freelance Model and Brand Ambassador
- Years active: 2014–present
- Agent: A Klasse Management (2015) Paranormal (2016–present)
- Known for: Hati Perempuan
- Height: 163 cm (5 ft 4 in)
- Spouse: Mohd Izham Tarmizi (2017)

Samihah binti Ahmad Baderi (born 22 February 1988), better known by her stage name Mia Ahmad, is a Malaysian actress, commercial/freelance model and a brand ambassador.

== Early life ==
Mia Ahmad was born in Taiping, Perak to a family of Perak heritage with a distant Pattani ancestry. She is the fourth of five siblings. Mia studied in SMK Treacher Methodist Girls' School during her secondary school years and holds a Sijil Pelajaran Malaysia (SPM) qualification.

== Career ==
Mia Ahmad was a former flight stewardess in the local commercial airline, Airasia X and Emirates for approximately 4 years before plunging into the showbiz world. After calling it a quit as a flight attendant, Mia started earning her living doing TV Commercials and modelling. She had been in Oral B and Nestle Nan Grow commercials before she became active into the field of acting until today.

After getting side roles in several TV dramas, she got her first main role in a drama series "Ku Tak Rela" for Slot Azalea (TV3) followed by getting a place in the TV3, popular drama slot for Akasia, "Hati Perempuan" along with a Malaysian rising star, Saharul Ridzwan.

Mia Ahmad has served as a brand ambassador for MumuScarves and Pesona Ayu Skin Care.

== Personal life ==
Mia married to Malaysian footballer, Izham Tarmizi on 13 January 2017.

On 28 September 2018, she gave birth to her son. following birth 2nd son and current pregnant 3rd

== Filmography ==
=== Television series ===
Year	Title	Role	Notes	Television station
2014	Putih Pasir Pantai	Jessica	Supporting	RTM 1
2014	Romi Cinta Julia	Amy	Supporting	TV3
2014	Rindu Awak 200%	Esyana	Supporting	TV3
2015	Ketuk - Ketuk Ramadhan (29)	Mia Ahmad	Guest Star	RTM 1
2015	Ku Tak Rela	Anis	Lead	TV3 (Slot Azalea)
2015	Hati Perempuan	Yuhanis	Lead	TV3 (Slot Akasia)
2015	Sayap Jibrail : Episode 4	Suhana	Supporting	Astro Prima
2015	Kifarah Mistik : Panas	Wanie	Supporting	TV3
2015	Sepahtu Reunion : Episode 5	Mia Ahmad	Guest Star	Astro Warna
2016	Dilema Wanita (Isteri Kedua)	Mawar	Lead	RTM 1
2016	Ahli Mesyuarat Tingkap	Mia Ahmad	Guest Star	TV3
2016	Mr. Boss, Miss Stalker	Sara Azreen	Lead	TV3 (Slot Dahlia)
2016	2000 km Ke Al-Haram	Wan Syafiqah	Lead	RTM 1
2017	Jejak Karmila	Suraya	Lead	TV3 (Slot Zehra)
2017	Bilo Nogori Jupo Kelate	Nik Safiya	Lead	TV3 (Slot Iris)
2019	Sara Kirana	Maisarah	Lead	RTM 1 (Slot Widuri)

=== Tele film ===
Year	Title	Role	Notes	Television station
2014	Papa Yibbie	Sara	Supporting	TV3
2014	Selempang Kuning	Melur	Supporting	Astro Prima and Maya HD
2014	Atie Setan	Juju	Supporting	Astro Prima and Maya HD
2014	Sebentuk Kunci Sedetik Cinta	Su	Supporting	TV9
2015	Jodoh Ke Uolls	Yuhanis	Lead	TV3
2015	Badai Cintamu	Keisha	Lead	TV Alhijrah
2015	Husin Peninglah	Julia	Lead	TV3
2015	Paktomai Aku Datang	Alisha	—	TV9
2016	Gadjet Mak Dah	Suhaila	Lead	TV9
2016	Ku Haramkan susu itu	Alisha	Lead	TV9
2016	Anak	Liya	Lead	RTM 2
2016	Cinta 3 Rasa	Hana	Supporting	TV9
2016	Ramadhan Hazim	Cikgu Fatihah	Supporting	RTM 1
2017	Kasih Seorang Ayah	Aminah	Lead	TV3

=== Film ===
Year	Title	Role	Notes
2017	Jibam	Miah	Supporting
—	Superbike The Movie	—	Supporting

=== Music video ===
Year	MV	Singer
2015	Takkan Pergi	Hyper Act

=== Television commercials ===
Year	Brand
2012	Oral B
2013	Nestle Nan Grow 3
2014	Hurixs

== Endorsements ==
- Ashhannas
- MumuScarves
- Pesona Ayu Skin Care
- OLI Candy
- Hajarose KL Hair Mist
- tonton
- Audela Adore Collagen
- Mia Ahmad For Maison De Couture

== Founder of Absolue by Mia Ahmad ==
- Tassel by Mia Ahmad (Hijab)
- Sweetness by Mia Ahmad (Perfume)
- Kohl Lashes by Mia Ahmad (Mascara)

== Awards and nominations ==
Year	Awards	Category	Result
2016	Anugerah Telenovela 2016	Popular Actress	Won
