= Pontianak Menjerit =

2005 film by Yusof Kelana

- Directed by: Yusof Kelana
- Written by: Yusof Kelana
- Produced by: MH Noor; Fetty Ismail; Yusof Kelana; Yusof Haslam
- Starring: Ziana Zain; Juliana Banos; Azlee Jaafar; Faizal Hussein; Lan Pet Pet; Zed Zaidi; Sheila Rusly; Zarina Zainoordin
- Edited by: Sallehan Shamsuddin
- Distributed by: Skop Production; ME Communications
- Release date: 16 June 2005
- Running time: 105 minutes
- Country: Malaysia
- Languages: Malay; Thai
- Budget: MYR 1.05 million
- Box office: MYR 0.90 million

Pontianak Menjerit (English: The Vampire Screamed) is 2005 Malaysian Malay-language horror comedy film directed by Yusof Kelana about siblings quarrel over a will worth millions of dollars to be inherited by their belated father.

== Plot ==
Datuk Pengeran Abdul Rahman has asked his lawyer to find the people to inherit his fortune worth RM30 million. Besides his two sons, Azlee, a businessman and Mazlan, a fashion designer, there are still two more people on the list. One of them is Saiful, an orphan and a mechanic who does not see that he will be inheriting his dad's million-dollar fortune, because he has never seen his dad before. The other is Ratnapuri, a Thai woman. Azlee, Datuk's eldest son, cannot accept the presence of Saiful and also Ratnapuri when his father's will is read at Datuk's residence. An argument between Azlee and Saiful ensues, causing the lawyer Salleh and his assistant Julia to postpone the will reading.

The next night when the will is read, and the four inheritors discover that the late Datuk Pangeran has put an condition in his will: they must stay together at the mansion for a month. Azlee, enables by his wife Ziana, is enraged over sharing the fortune with Saiful and Ratnapuri, but a sudden storm calms him down.

During their stay at the mansion to fulfill the will's condition, Saiful, his friend Yasin, Mazlan, Ratnapuri and the mansion's caretaker Pak Mail get along, but Azlee and Ziana remain hostile to Saiful and Ratnapuri. One day, Julia suddenly goes missing while having a talk with Ratnapuri, causing Azlee to blame her for Julia's disappearance. Encik Salleh calls the police, led by Inspector Angelina, who advises the inheritors to remain calm as the detectives investigate Julia's disappearance.

One night, Mazlan sees an apparition resembling Julia, and goes missing while following it. Azlee and Ziana become increasingly hostile of Ratnapuri. Meanwhile, Ratnapuri calls for the assistance of her friend from Thailand, Somchai, and the use of black magic is implied. Saiful also experiences several sightings of pontianak during his stay. Meanwhile, his jealous girlfriend Zarina drives to the mansion to see him, suspecting him of infidelity.

Pak Mail hires a shaman to cleanse the place, as they believe the disappearances are caused by evil spirits. That night, Ratnapuri walks out of the mansion. Azlee, Ziana, Saiful and Yasin investigate, and discover an abandoned house hidden nearby, which Ratnapuri goes to. It is revealed that Ratnapuri and Somchai have been orchestrating the kidnappings so she can have the inheritance for herself. The pontianak sightings are revealed to be state-of-the-art hologram technology. Zarina, accompanied by her friend Syella, arrives. They join Pak Mail and the shaman to perform the cleansing ritual. Meanwhile, Mazlan manages to escape, but is mistaken as a pocong. He repeatedly farts to gain the attention of those performing the ritual, but to no avail as they believe evil spirirs must be ignored.

The police team and Inspector Angelina arrive and an intense fight ensues between Somchai and a special force policeman. Ratnapuri and Somchai are subdued by the police, and Julia and Mazlan are freed. Everyone is relieved, and they realize the true purpose of the will's condition: having them stay together at the mansion so they can reconcile and learn to get along with each other.

== Cast ==
- Ziana Zain as Ziana
- Juliana Banos as Julia
- Azlee Jaafar as Azlee
- Faizal Hussein as Yassin
- Lan Pet Pet as Mazlan
- Zed Zaidi as Saiful
- Sheila Rusly as Ratana Puri
- Zarina Zainoordin as Zarina
- Nursyella as Syella
- Jalaluddin Hassan as Mr. Salleh (Lawyer)
- Angelina Tan as Inspector Angelina
- Osman Kering as Bomoh Hantu
- Amran Tompel as Pak Mail
- Z. Zamri as Detective
- Adam Corrie as Somchai
- Julia Hana as Pontianak
- Raja Noor Baizura as Datin
- A. Galak as Datuk Pangeran Abdul Rahman

== Release ==
The film was released on 16 June 2005 and went box office.

== Awards and nominations ==
18th Malaysian Film Festival, 2005

- Best Cinematography - Indra Che Muda (Won)
- Best Actress in Supporting Role - Sheila Rusly - Nominated
- Best Editor - Nominated
- Best Film - Nominated
- Best Music Score - Nominated
- Best Screenplay - Nominated
- Best Sound - Nominated

== See also ==
- Pontianak
