= One Cent Thief =

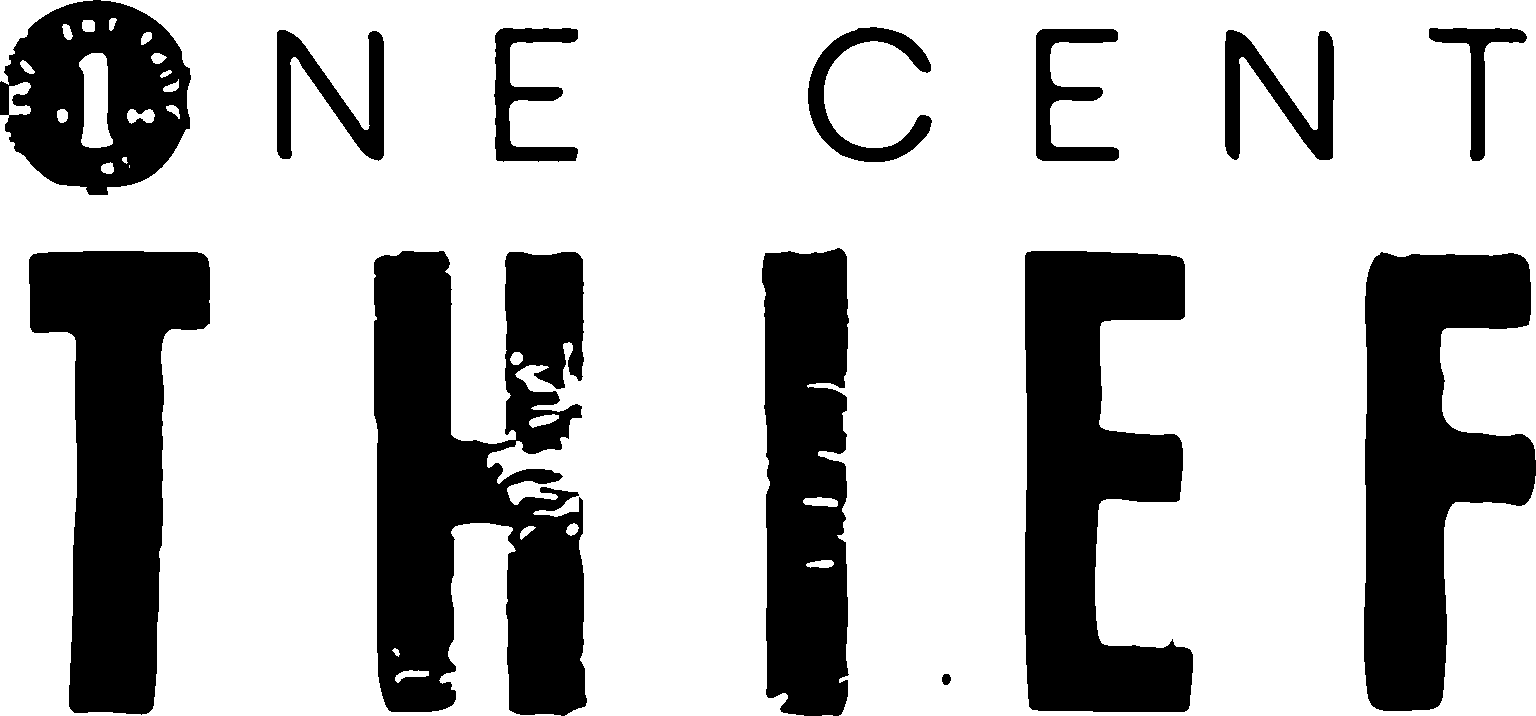
- Genre: Drama; thriller; action
- Created by: Alfie Palermo
- Developed by: Alfie Palermo
- Written by: Alfie Palermo
- Directed by: Alfie Palermo (season 1–2); Ariff Zulkarnain (season 2)
- Starring: Syafiq Kyle; Faizal Hussein; Azira Shafinaz; Fabian Loo; Sofia Jane
- Opening theme: "Encryption"
- Ending theme: "Punca" by Lil J and Putera Muhammad (final episode)
- Composer: Irena Taib
- Country of origin: Malaysia
- Original languages: Malay; English; Tamil (Note: With Malay subititles.); Mandarin (Note: Season 2 only.)
- No. of seasons: 2
- No. of episodes: 16

Production
- Executive producer: Raja Jastina Raja Arshad
- Producers: Zurina Ramli; Alfie Palermo; Natasha Azlan
- Production locations: Kuala Lumpur, Malaysia
- Cinematography: Tan Teck Zee
- Editors: Safwan Salleh; Basil Faizal
- Running time: 45 minutes
- Production companies: Astro Shaw; Independent Pictures

Original release
- Network: Astro Ria
- Release: October 8 – November 26, 2022
- Network: Astro Citra
- Release: January 31 – March 21, 2025

One Cent Thief is a Malaysian action television drama series broadcast on Astro Ria and Astro Citra. Directed by Alfie Palermo (who also served as the showrunner) and Ariff Zulkarnain, it stars Syafiq Kyle in the lead role along with ensemble casts. The series was based on an events that shook the banking history of Malaysia in 1990. The series' first season premiered on Astro Ria from 8 October to 26 November 2022, while its second season premiered on Astro Citra from 31 January to 21 March 2025.

== Premise ==
Iman Shah, a banker at Bintang Bank, desperated to pay for his treatment costs and pay off his father's debt to illegal moneylenders. By using his intelligence, he hacked the bank's security system to steal one cent from each bank customer's account and managed to get a large sum of money.

== Cast ==
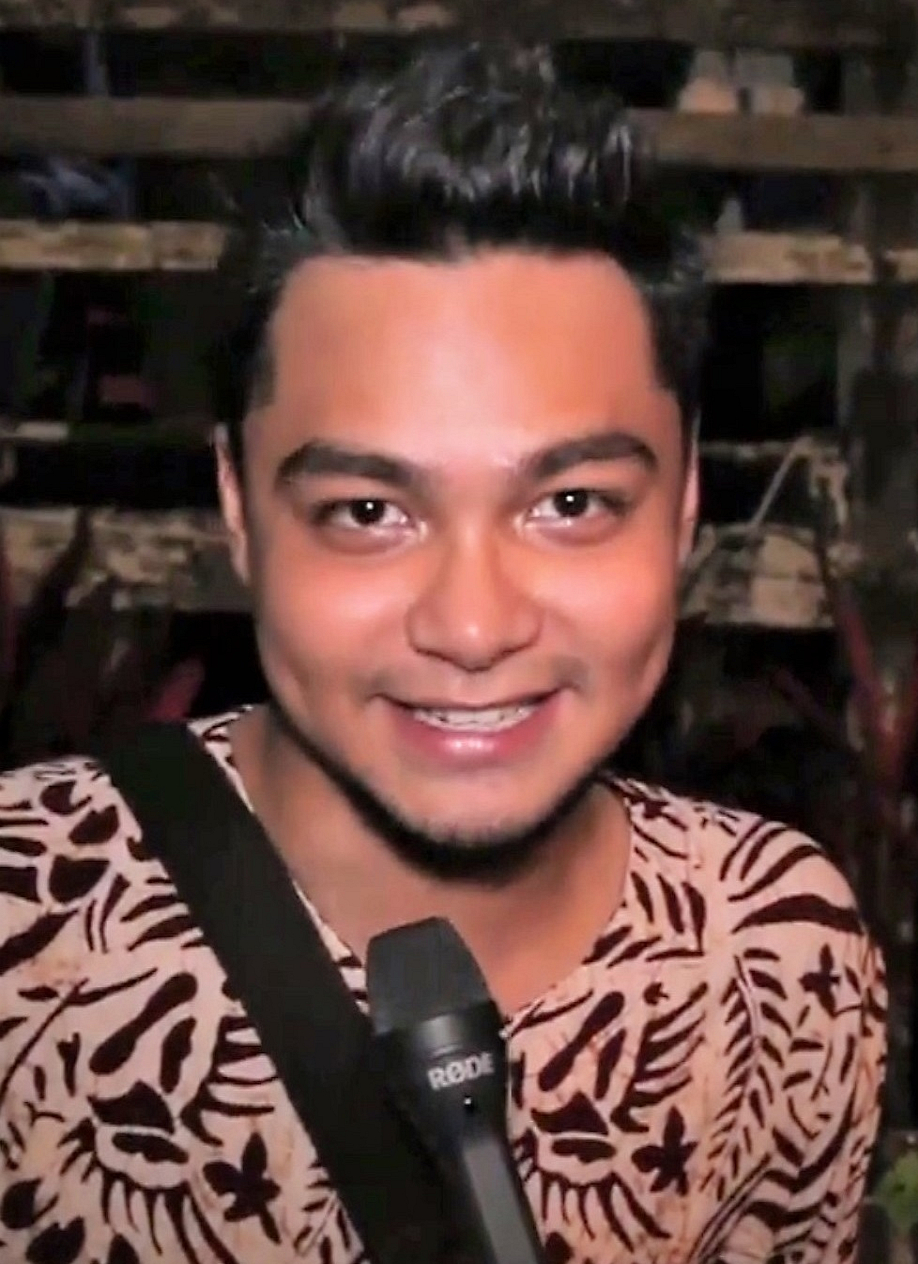
Syafiq Kyle as Iman Shah.

=== Main ===
- Syafiq Kyle as Iman Shah/Nuriman Shah (season 1–2)
- Faizal Hussein as Shah Karim (season 1–2)
- Azira Shafinaz as Intan/Intan Azizan (season 1–2)
- Fabian Loo as Ash/Chen (season 1–2)
- Sofia Jane as Ibu Zara/Zara Abdullah (season 1–2)

=== Supporting ===
- Aghonderan Sahadevan as Devan (season 1)
- Amerul Affendi as Kadak (season 1)
- Carmen Soo as Irene De Costa (season 1-2)
- Sathisvaran as Dinesh (season 1)
- Krishna Kumar Nair as Sathish (season 1)
- Rubi Rubini as Mimi (season 1)
- Amir Nafis as Wan Zairol (season 1)
- Fadhli Masoot as Shemad (season 1)
- Aleza Shadan as Hana (season 1)
- Syed Irfan as young Iman (season 1)
- Airiezara Jasmin as young Intan (season 1)
- Zain Hamid as Redza Ariffin (season 1)
- Pyan Habib as Osman (season 1)
- Kamarulzaman Taib as Tan Sri Syed Hussin (season 1–2)
- Douglas Lim as Inspector Lim (season 1)
- Abbas Mahmood as Saddiq (season 1–2)
- Trisha Ooi as Diyana @ D (season 2)
- Syarul Ezani as Dzia Abdul Rahman (season 2)
- Shashi Tharan as Captain Chandran (season 2)
- Tony Eusoff as Alex Pereira (season 2)
- Jason Chong as David (season 2)
- Aziz M. Osman as Tuan Seri Khalid Ilyas (season 2)
- Pushpa Narayan as Malini (season 2)
- Irfan Zaini as Mohan (season 2)

=== Guests ===
- Nazir Razak as pedestrian/Bro
- Anwari Ashraf as Dani
- Keanu Azman as the news anchor 1
- Luqman Hariz as the news anchor 2

== Episodes ==
Season	Episodes	Originally released		
Season	Episodes	First released	Last released	Network
1	8	October 8, 2022	November 26, 2022	Astro Ria
2	8	January 31, 2025	March 21, 2025	Astro Citra

=== Season 1 ===
No.	Title	Original release date
1	"The Root of All Evil (Pilot)"	8 October 2022
2	"In the Belly of the Beast"	15 October 2022
3	"Every Thought a Prayer"	22 October 2022
4	"The Baby and The Thief"	29 October 2022
5	"Destroyer of Worlds"	5 November 2022
6	"What Money Can't Buy"	12 November 2022
7	"Sacrifice"	19 November 2022
8	"Digital Karma"	26 November 2022

=== Season 2 ===
No.	Title	Original release date
1	"Hail to the Thief"	31 January 2025
2	"The Price of Freedom"	7 February 2025
3	"Karma is Like the Rain"	14 February 2025
4	"Killing in the Name"	21 February 2025
5	"Code Red"	28 February 2025
6	"The Billion Dollar Scandal"	7 March 2025
7	"And Justice for All"	14 March 2025
8	"The Man in the Mirror"	21 March 2025
