= Seribu Nina =

2022 Malaysian television series

- Genre: Romantic comedy Fantasy
- Written by: Nazri M. Annuar; June Tan; Azhar Amirulhisyam; Baizura Kahar; Hazo M.; Louise Manjaji
- Directed by: Umi Salwana Omar
- Starring: Syafiq Kyle; Adriana Adnan; Marsha Milan
- Country of origin: Malaysia
- Original language: Malay
- No. of episodes: 10

Production
- Executive producers: Kingsley Warner; Imillya Roslan; Steven Lim Tze Siang; T.P. Lim
- Producer: Gayatri Su-Lin Pilla
- Cinematography: Mohd Roslan Jalaluddin
- Editor: John Hafiz
- Production company: Infinitus Entertainment

Original release
- Release: 19 May – 16 June 2022

Seribu Nina (English: One Thousand Ninas) is 2022 Malaysian television series directed by Umi Salwana Omar which stars Syafiq Kyle, Adriana Adnan and Marsha Milan. The series revolves around a straight-laced Amar who is having second thoughts about marrying his free-spirited girlfriend, Nina. But when Nina is kidnapped, he is forced to embark on an interdimensional journey to find his love. The show premiered on 19 May 2022 on Viu as a Viu Original series.

== Synopsis ==
Amar is a history lecturer—about as strait-laced as they come. His girlfriend, Nina, is a barista at a café who lives by YOLO (You Only Live Once). He is a studious and precise nerd who'd rather read a book in a quiet garden; she is a feisty, spontaneous free spirit who hikes mountains and dances in the street. But while Nina is completely smitten by Amar, Amar doubts his feelings. Does Nina really fit into his life's plans? Is she really wifey material? Meanwhile, Nina is approached by a woman named Didi. From the way she dresses, it's obvious she's from 'out-of-town'. She tells Nina that she was assigned to bring her back. And Nina knows exactly what she's talking about.

Thing takes an unexpected turn when Amar, after rejecting Nina's spontaneous marriage proposal, sees her being taken away by a mysterious hooded man. They disappear into the back office of the café where she works. Amar gives chase, bumping into Didi but as they step through the door, they are no longer in the café.

Or rather, they're no longer in the café Amar knows. This one looks different, both familiar and unfamiliar at the same time. Amar has entered a whole other dimension and to this surprise, this is only one of a thousand parallel universes, each one unique and governed by its own rules. Searching for his missing girlfriend, Amar forms an unlikely partnership with Didi as they jump from dimension to dimension. In each new world, Amar discovers a version of Nina with different qualities - some better, some worse, and some perfect - but in each encounter, he learns more about why his Nina is the one for him.

However, his cosmic road trip also exposes a series of secrets as he realizes his Nina isn't who she says she is. What is she running from? Why was Didi sent after her? And will Amar and Nina end up together or are they destined to remain star-crossed?.

== Cast ==
=== Main ===
- Syafiq Kyle as Amar
- Adriana Adnan as Nina
- Marsha Milan as Didi

=== Supporting ===
- Adlin Aman Ramlie as Firdaus
- Fahmy Reza as Sado
- Nadia Aqilah as Yati
- Chelsia Ng as Ann
- Roniey Syahrul as Hooded Assassin
- Riezman Khuzaimi as Sebi
- Arash Mohamad as Orang Besar
- Rykarl Iskandar
- Firdaus Ghufran

== Production ==
Seribu Nina is directed by Umi Salwana Omar, who has also directed Gol & Gincu: Vol. 2 (2018), a sequel to a 2005 film Gol & Gincu and has been nominated Best New Director at the Malaysian Film Festival 2019. She is also one of the four directors that worked on Sa Balik Baju (2019) which is streaming on Netflix.

Adriana Adnan, both a TV presenter and actress, expressed gratitude for being able to play multiple characters as she plays different versions of Nina with her favourite being Pendekar Nina (Warrior Nina). Syafiq Kyle, who plays Amar, found the filming experience to be quite different to what he is used to as he had to play multiple characters at a time, despite boasting a decade's experience and awards which includes Most Popular TV Actor at the 32nd Anugerah Bintang Popular Berita Harian in 2019. As for Marsha Milan, this marks her second feature in a Viu Original as she acted in the second and third season of Keluarga Baha Don (2019-2021).

The series is produced by Infinitus Entertainment, a company led by Hong Kong singer-actor-producer Andy Lau who oversees the Malaysian team led by Gayatri Su-Lin Pillai who serves as producer. Their previous works include local hits such as action-flick J2: J Retribusi (2021), horror-comedy classic Hantu Kak Limah (2018) and Malaysia's first mixed martial arts movie, Sangkar (2019).
