= Nur (TV series) =

2018 Malaysian drama series

- Season 1 (Promotional poster)
- Genre: Drama; Islamic; Romance; Conflict
- Directed by: Shahrulezad Mohameddin
- Starring: Amyra Rosli; Syafiq Kyle
- Opening theme: Tak Pernah Hilang - Amylea and Kaer (season 1); Tetap Kamu - Amylea and Megat (season 2)
- Ending theme: Tak Pernah Hilang - Amylea and Kaer (season 1); Tetap Kamu - Amylea and Megat (season 2)
- Country of origin: Malaysia
- Original language: Malay
- No. of seasons: 2
- No. of episodes: 34

Production
- Running time: 40 minutes
- Production company: Radius One

Original release
- Network: TV3; MNCTV
- Release: 14 May 2018 – 25 April 2019

Related
- Kalis Kasih

Nur is a 2018-2019 Malaysian television series directed by Shahrulezad Mohameddin, starring Amyra Rosli as the title role and Syafiq Kyle as Ustaz Adam. The series focuses on the relationship between a pious man and a prostitute who practices her faith in an unconventional manner. The premiere episode garnered 11 million viewers and became a controversy during its run. The series premiered on TV3 from 14 May 2018 to 14 June 2018 during the Ramadhan. A sequel, Nur 2 was aired in 2019, after the success of the prequel.

A feature film based on the series was planned. However, the anticipated production did not materialise. A theatre staging based on the series also was planned.

== Episodes ==
=== Season 1 (2018) ===
Tells about Nur, a prostitute who wants to get out of her dirty life. The meeting with Ustaz Adam gave light to Nur. However, in seeking divine pleasure and true human love, Nur struggles with the acceptance of society, especially Adam's family which is highly respected.

=== Season 2 (2019) ===
Nur and Adam who continue their lives in the house of Miss Mona's legacy. In addition to teaching children to study at home. Adam is still continuing his activity of giving da'wah in the alleys which is also supported by Nur. Adam's subtle preaching approach by reaching out to the community in the brothel without judging anyone made him popular. In silence, Adam was observed by Juita, a popular prostitute and also Nur's friend in the alley. Juita also dreams of being like Nur. She wants Adam to be hers and is slowly looking for opportunities to accompany Adam.

== Cast ==
- Amyra Rosli as Nur (seasons 1–2) – A young woman who is interested in studying religion despite being raised by her mother who is a prostitute. Nur is a good woman, tenacious, and tenacious in going through the various tests given. Even though the trials he faced were very severe, he never left his prayers. He also wants to get out of the 'lane world' and live a normal life as a servant of God. Nur has also met several men who she thought could change her life but she was wrong. After Nur was disappointed by several men, Nur was determined to try to change her fate on her own, but her life began to change when Nur met a young Ustaz named Adam.
- Syafiq Kyle as Ustaz Adam (seasons 1–2) – A young man who has a deep knowledge of Islam and grew up in a family that fully practices the teachings of Islam. Adam is a shy but very intelligent man. Adam is a graduate from a university in Jordan. Adam is the son of Datuk Ayah Haji Mukhsin and Datin Ibu Hajah Musalmah. His father, a well-known preacher and respected by the community. One day, when Adam finished the Fajr prayer in congregation at a mosque owned by his father, Adam met a young woman who was writing a question on a piece of paper to be asked during the Fajr lecture later. The woman was aware of Adam's presence and ran out of the mosque without having time to finish her question.

=== Supporting actor ===
- Riena Diana as Dr. Qhadeeja (seasons 1–2)
- Noorkhiriah as Aisyah (seasons 1–2)
- Azhan Rani as Ustaz Syed Hamadi (seasons 1–2)
- Laila Nasir as Miss Mona (season 1)
- Datuk Jalaluddin Hassan as Datuk Ayah Haji Mukhsin (seasons 1–2)
- Fatimah Abu Bakar as Datin Ibu * Hajah Musalmah (seasons 1–2)
- Atiq Azman as Amirul (seasons 1–2)
- Zaidi Omar as Datuk Tajuddin (seasons 1–2)
- Elmy Moin as Marzuki (seasons 1–2)
- Mathni Razak as Dr Mukhriz (seasons 1–2)
- Kuna Muzani as Datin Orkid (seasons 1–2)
- Jijie Zainal as Jojo (seasons 1–2)
- Hasrulnizam Osman as Ustaz Yassin (seasons 1-2)
- Azar Azmi as Juita (season 2)
- Eyra Hazali as Suraya (seasons 2)
- Noryati Taib as Nekma (season 2)
- Uchee Fukada as Uchee (season 2)
- Munaa Bella as Ustazah Nurul (season 2)

== Episodes ==
Season	Episodes	Originally released	
Season	Episodes	First released	Last released
1	19	May 14, 2018	June 14, 2018
2	15	April 2, 2019	April 25, 2019

== Awards and nominations ==
Year	Award	Category	Recipient	Result	Ref.
2018	22nd Skrin Awards	Best Serial Drama	Nur	Won	
2018	22nd Skrin Awards	Best Actor – Serial Drama	Syafiq Kyle	Won	
2018	22nd Skrin Awards	Best Actress – Serial Drama	Amyra Rosli	Won	
2019	33rd Juara Lagu Awards	Finalist	Amylea Azizan & Kaer Azami – Tak Pernah Hilang	Nominated	
2019	6th Kuala Lumpur Drama Festival Awards	Choice Drama	Nur	Won	
2019	6th Kuala Lumpur Drama Festival Awards	Choice Director	Shahrulezad Mohameddin	Won	
2019	6th Kuala Lumpur Drama Festival Awards	Choice Scriptwriter	Shahrulezad Mohameddin	Won	
2019	6th Kuala Lumpur Drama Festival Awards	Choice Actor	Syafiq Kyle	Won	
2019	6th Kuala Lumpur Drama Festival Awards	Choice Actress	Amyra Rosli	Nominated	
2019	6th Kuala Lumpur Drama Festival Awards	Choice Antagonist Act	Azhan Rani	Won	
2019	6th Kuala Lumpur Drama Festival Awards	Choice On Screen Couple	Syafiq Kyle & Amyra Rosli	Won	
2019	32nd Bintang Popular Berita Harian Awards	Most Popular TV Actor	Syafiq Kyle	Won	
2019	32nd Bintang Popular Berita Harian Awards	Most Popular TV Actress	Azar Azmi	Nominated	
2019	32nd Bintang Popular Berita Harian Awards	Most Popular Male New Artist	Raja Atiq	Nominated	
2019	32nd Bintang Popular Berita Harian Awards	Best Couple – Drama	Syafiq Kyle & Amyra Rosli	Nominated	
2019	32nd Bintang Popular Berita Harian Awards	Most Popular Antagonist Act	Azhan Rani	Nominated	
2019	32nd Bintang Popular Berita Harian Awards	Most Popular Antagonist Act	Azar Azmi	Nominated	

== Film adaptation ==
Upcoming movies In planning. Amyra Rosli (Nur) & Syafiq Kyle (Ustaz Adam) are returning to the cast.

== Sequel ==
According to the director Shahrulezad, a sequel is being planned. He said: "I was asked to produce Nur 2, because people wanted to know what happened to Nur and Hamadi. However I thought that in general any piece of work should not be extended just because it received a good response. After many had requested for it to be produced, including the TV3, I finally got involved. I then had a new storyline and presented to the station. They are confident and agree with the story." Nur 2 is co-produced by iflix and available to stream for free.
