= Saharul Ridzwan =

Malaysian actor and model (born 1989)

- ساحرالرضوان
- Born: Muhammad Saharul Ridzwan bin Hashim; 26 January 1989 (age 37); Kuantan, Pahang, Malaysia
- Occupations: Actor, singer, model
- Years active: 2011–present
- Height: 1.78 m (5 ft 10 in)
- Spouse: Deena Emir (m. 2016)
- Children: 3

Muhammad Saharul Ridzwan bin Hashim (born 26 January 1989) is a Malaysian actor and model. He began his entertainment career in 2013 after participating in Hero Remaja 2011/12. He since then appears in several dramas such as Hati Perempuan where he paired with Mia Ahmad and Kau, Aku, Kita with Janna Nick.

== Early life ==
He was born on January 26, 1989, in Kuantan, Pahang, and grew up in Chabang Empat, Kelantan. He holds a degree in aircraft maintenance engineering at a college in Negeri Sembilan flights. Married to Qaabila Deena Emir Mohammed Akif Emir.

== Career ==
Saharul made his first appearance in Hero Remaja 2012. He earned third place in the competition behind Fattah Amin, Hafidz Roshdi and Syafiq Kyle. Then he ventured into acting with a supporting role in several tele-films and drama. Casting him as Faizal in the drama Love You Mr. Arrogant (2013) managed to get the attention of the public. Following the success of psycho Syarul role in the drama, he was given the starring role in the drama Romi Love Julia (2014).

Saharul at the announcement of finalists Anugerah Bintang Popular BH 2014 (ABPBH 2014) at the Royal Chulan. Saharul also nominated as Best Male New Artist in Anugerah Bintang Popular Artists 2014. Saharul also won the Popular Action Selfie in the Anugerah Bintang Popular Berita Harian 2015.

Saharul growing popularity when he plays in the drama Tengku Zaril Heart Women who live on TV3 Akasia slot. Hati perempuan is a drama adaptation of the novel Hati Perempuan or A woman's heart work Nur Ain Al-Abbas. A strong partnership between Syarul with new actress, Mia Ahmad managed to attract the attention of many people.

He also shine alongside teen actress, Janna Nick in drama Kau Aku Kita.

Syarul appear with drama adaptation of the novel that is as beautiful as Fate Love coupling Amyra actor Jim served around the month of Ramadan in 2016 and I We're tele Kingdom with Janna Nick, innovators and Issey Fazlisham Roshdi on Eid 2016.

He first appeared and drama film directed by Michael Ang namely #AssalamualaikumCinta alongside Kamal Adli & Ghost Mental Hospital as a ghost character with Abam Bocey & Fizz Fairuz will be screened later this year.

== Filmography ==
=== Film ===
Year	Title	Role
2022	Renjana	Johan
2023	Coast Guard Malaysia: Ops Helang	Lieutenant Maritim Hafidz Othman

Year	Title	Role
2022	Renjana	Johan
2023	Coast Guard Malaysia: Ops Helang	Lieutenant Maritim Hafidz Othman

=== Television ===
Year	Title	Role	TV channel
2012	3 Janji	Arif	TV3
2013	Hujan	Azaril	TV3
2013	Kisah Cinta	Azmi (muda)	TV3
2013	Maskara	Hamdan	TV1
2013	Love You Mr. Arrogant	Faizal	TV3
2013	Sweetheart Fantasia	Jimmy Daeng	Tonton
2014	Tanah Kubur Musim 13: Kejinya Zina	Jamal	Astro Oasis
2014	Romi Cinta Julia	Romi Suffian	TV3
2014	Kifarah: Duit & Kenan	Fuad	TV3
2014	Mat Cepat	Sam	TV2
2014	Fajar Aiman	Aiman	TV3
2014	Berlima Ramadan	Ilham	TV1
2015	Puteri Bukan Nama Sebenar	Mirza	TV3
2015	Hati Perempuan	Tengku Zaril	TV3
2015	Street Vendetta	Fakruzi/Kojie	TV2
2015	Kau Aku Kita	Iman Firdaus / Im Aus	TV3
2015	Sayap Jibril: Keluarga Sakinah Dijentik Jahiliah	Syam	Astro Oasis
2016	Kifarah Mistik: Nifaq	Jie	TV3
2016	Seindah Takdir Cinta	Shahriman	TV3
2016	#AssalamualaikumCinta	Rykal Safuan	Astro Ria
2016	Rumi & Jawi	Afiq	Astro Prima
2017	Arluna	Johan Arif	Astro Ria
2017	Megat Extend	Megat	Astro Warna
2017	Setia Menunggumu	Akhdiat/Adi	HyppTV
2017	Kerana Satu Janji	Ilham Hazri	TV3
2017	Tauke Jamu	Dazril	TV3
2017	Cha & Chor	Chor	YouTube
2018	Dia Pengantinku	Syed Ashraf	RTM
2018	Tok Adi	Hakim	Astro Oasis
2018	Zahir Tak Terucap	Hisyam	TV3
2018	Jangan Benci Cintaku	Shahrizal Hayrat	TV3
2018	Mawar Murni	Harris	TV3
