= Faizal Hussein =

Malaysian actor

- فيزالحسين
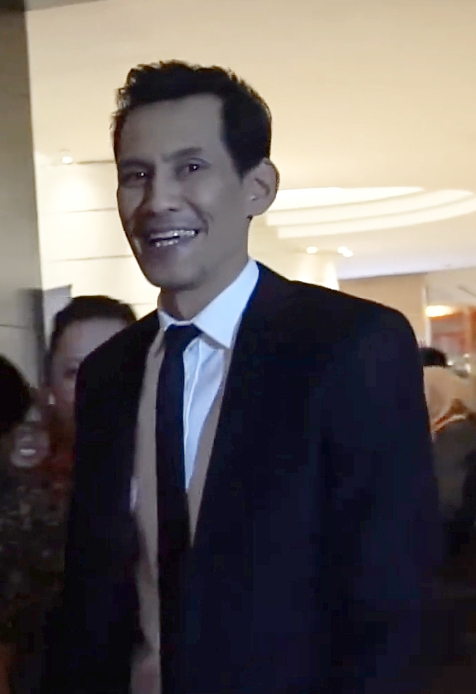
- Faizal Hussein at the premiere of the film Kalla: Hidup Atau Mati in October 2018.
- Born: Mohd Faizal bin Hussein; May 31, 1967 (age 58); Gombak, Selangor, Malaysia
- Occupation: Celebrity
- Years active: 1972–present
- Spouse: Suhaila Sulaiman (m. 2004)
- Children: 2
- Relatives: Fairuz Hussein (elder sister); Rosyam Nor (second cousin)

Mohd Faizal Hussein (born 31 May 1967) is a Malaysian actor. He made his acting debut in 1972 and is known for his role as Roy in the 1986 teen film Gila-Gila Remaja, directed by his father Hussein Abu Hassan. In 2019, Harian Metro listed him as one of the top 10 best Malaysian actors of all time.

== Career ==
Faizal Hussein made his first film appearance in the film Darah Panglima in 1972, at the age of five.

Starting acting in 1982 with the film Senja Merah, he jumped up after starring Gila-Gila Remaja in 1986 as Azroy. Directed by his father, the late Hussein Abu Hassan, he made a huge impact for Faizal Hussein to prove his family's artistic blood.

After that, he gained a lot of attention and starred in several films that featured him playing the protagonist. After almost three years of not appearing in a movie, he finally got the offer to bring the antagonist through Leftenan Adnan. His attempt succeeded, and led to various protagonist characters he brought to the film, as well as drama.

Faizal Hussein appeared with Saiful Apek and Zul Yahya in a comedy investigation action film MX3 directed by Yusof Kelana on 25 November 2003.

In 2013, Faizal Hussein returned to the role of Azroy in a movie directed by V. Nagaraj, Gila-Gila Remaja 2, the continuation of the 1985 movie, Gila-Gila Remaja that directed by his father. This film was also starred by Hairul Azreen, Faralyna Idris, Taiyuddin Bakar, Fizz Fairuz, and Bella Dally.

On 17 January 2015, Faizal Hussein played the main character along with Sari Yanti in the television film, Penjara Seorang Isteri based on Salmah and Zaid's wedding on the basis of mutual love and their marriage was given two shades. In this television film, based on a true story, Faizal acted as Zaid.

Working under the direction of Pekin Ibrahim, Faizal Hussein succeeded in acting as Pit in the film Mat Moto released on 14 January 2016.

== Personal life ==
Faizal Hussein has a wife, Suhaila Sulaiman, who was also an actress. They have two children, a daughter named Fazryn and a son named Fazrick. Who was born in 2005 and 2008 respectively.

== Filmography ==
Key
Unreleased movies/dramas

=== Films ===
Year	Title	Role	Notes
1972	Darah Panglima		Debut film appearances
1973	Kelana		
1973	Penyamun Si Bongkok	Young Ladim/Putih	
1975	Bunga Padi Berdaun Lalang		
1982	Senja Merah	Young Anuar	
1985	Bujang Selamat	Bujang	
1986	Gila-Gila Remaja	Azroy @ Roy	
1987	Gila-Gila Si Pikoy		
1988	Tuah	Sultan Anuar Alauddin Shah/Hang Jebat	
1988	Fighting Madam 2		Hong Kong film
1989	Tak Kisahlah Beb!	Borhan @ Bob	
1989	Misteri Harta Karun	Ganda	Indonesian film
1991	Kanta Serigala	Zarul	
1991	Bayangan Maut	Eddie	
1992	XX Ray	Anuar	
1993	Fantasi	Teruna/Rahmat	
1994	Sofia-Jo	Joe	
1996	Litar Kasih	Herman	
1996	Siapa Dia?	Saiful	
1997	Sate	Kadir	
2000	Leftenan Adnan	Private Ayob	
2001	Getaran	Zamri	
2002	KL Menjerit	Pit	
2002	Gerak Khas The Movie II	Frankie	
2003	Janji Diana	Ijoy	
2003	MX3	Mamat	
2005	Pontianak Menjerit	Yassin	
2005	GK3 The Movie	Raymond	
2009	Jalang		
2010	2 Alam		
2011	Abuya	Abuya	
2011	Datin Ghairah	Suffian	
2012	Azura	Azura's dad	
2012	Bunohan	Ilham	
2012	Leftwings		
2013	Gila-Gila Remaja 2	Azroy @ Roy	
2013	Longkai	Bada	
2013	Balada Pencinta	Gangster	
2014	Fobia Malam Pertama	Massage handle	
2014	Manisnya Cinta Di Cappadoccia	Bakhtiar	
2015	Gudang Kubur	Anwa	
2015	Kapsul	Zohri Ibrahim	
2016	Mat Moto	Pit	
2016	Mrs K	Tano	Malaysia - Hong Kong film
2017	Tombiruo: Penunggu Rimba	Pondolou	
2017	KL Wangan	Yudi	
2018	Dukun	Karim	
2018	Kalla: Hidup Atau Mati	Dr. Ezahar	
2018	7ujuh	Inspector Azmi	
2019	XX Ray III	Anuar	
2019	The Deed of Death	Haji Daud	
2019	Pusaka	ASP Mansor	
2020	M4M4	Inspector Azahari	
2021	Proksi	Mr. Roy	
2022	Rajawali	Abang Long	
2022	Remp-It 2	Pit	Special appearance
2022	Daddyku Gangster	Karim	
2023	Harum Malam	Kiai Hassan	
2023	Imam	Haji Syamsuri	
2023	Syaitan Munafik	Nizam	
2023	Bintang Yang Terindah	Amir	
TBA	Saadiah: Bekal Kasih Merdeka		Post-production
TBA	Esok Yang Lebih Baik		Post-production

=== Television series ===
Year	Title	Role	TV channel	Notes
1994	Hati Waja	Sharif	TV1	
1994	Runtuh		TV1	
1999	Fitrah Khadijah		TV1	
2001	Madu Empat	Alang	TV3	
2004	Sembilu	Azman	TV2	
2006	Sembilu Kasih	Azman	TV3	
2008	Fajar Kinaboi	Kamal	TV1	
2008	Abadi Sebuah Cinta	Faizal	TV3	
2009	Senja Permai	Hairi	Astro Prima	
2009–2010	Cuci Cuci Services		TV2	
2011	Gerak Khas (Season 13)	Joe	TV2	Episode: "Buru"
2011	Seharum Kenanga	Omar	TV2	
2011	Pak Su Man	Tarmizi	TV Alhijrah	
2012	Puaka Bunga Tanjung	Andaman	TV9	
2012	Metro Skuad (Season 1)	Joe	TV2	Episode: "Jerat Awang Hitam"
2012	Lara Hati	Roslin	TV9	Guest artist
2012	Ameera	Jai	TV3	Guest artist
2012	Dalam Hati Ada Taman	Tuan Zul	Astro Ria	
2013	Metro Skuad (Season 2)	Rambo	TV2	Episode: "Jalan Pintas"
2013	Dahlia	Fuad	Astro Mustika HD	
2014	Beret Hijau (Season 2)		TV1	
2014	Oh My English! (Season 3)	Homeless	Astro TVIQ	Episode: "Ramadan"
2014	Jiwa	Alif Rizal	TV3	
2014	Azam Ramadan Su	Luqman	TV3	
2015	Papa Chef	Chef Zikri	TV1	
2016	Cinta Macarons	Jefri	TV2	
2016	Si Kolot Suamiku	Tengku Ahmad Ehsan	Astro Ria	
2017	Cerita Dari Mastika	Hamid	Astro Prima	Episode: "Kereta Rosak"
2018	KOPI	A Bum	Tonton	Episode: "Kopi Jantan Kaw"
2019	Devoted	Musa	Viu	
2019	Strike Back: Revolution	Hassan Ahmed	Cinemax	2 episodes
2020	Dua Takdir Cinta	Tuan Ismail	Astro Prima	
2020	Jaman Tori	Sultan Sulaiman	Awesome TV	
2021	Kisah Rumah Tangga	Kalif	Astro Ria	Episode: "Azan Rumah Abah"
2021	i-Tanggang	Rahmat	Astro Citra	
2021	Dak Dan Ofis		Awesome TV	
2021	Oh My Hantaran	Bujas	TV9	Special appearance
2022	Epilog 3 Naga	Azroy	Awesome TV	
2022	One Cent Thief	Shah Karim	Astro Ria	
2023–2024	W: Two Worlds	Omar Yusuf	Viu	
2024	Menanti Senja	Kamal	TV3	
2024	Baby Papa	Didie	Tonton	
2025	One Cent Thief 2	Shah Karim	Astro Citra	
2025	Bidaah	Walid Muhammad	Viu	

=== Telemovie ===
Year	Title	Role	TV channel
1986	Drama Minggu Ini: Putik Kasih	Farid	TV1
1992	Cari-Cari Jodoh	Zainal	TV1
1992	Identiti		TV3
1993	Sebuah Pelayaran		VCD
1993	Antara Dua Bayang		TV3
1994	Hello	Haz's lover	TV3
1994	Pengantin Popular		TV3
1995	Diari Hati Julia		TV3
1996	Prelude		TV3
1996	Putih Gaun Pengantin	Ridzuan	TV3
1997	Wasiat Untuk Natili		TV3
1997	Maaf Kami Tak Sengaja		TV3
1999	Impian Suraya		
2003	Kordi & Konah		
2007	Sebuah Ijtihad	Ehsan Ali	
2007	Lahad		TV2
2008	Kalam Cinta Rabiah	Zakuan	TV3
2009	Wira Malam Bisikan Naga	Wira Legend	Astro Ria
2010	Kasut Emas	Otai	TV2
2011	Bertemu Kasih	Syukri	TV1
2011	Anak	Amir	Astro Prima
2011	Maafkan Aku Papa	Salim	TV2
2011	Kenapa Aku Mencuri ?	Pejal	Astro Prima
2011	Aku bin Abdullah		Astro Prima
2011	Kerana Aku Seorang Anak	Hisham	TV9
2012	Aku Bukan Buaya		NTV7
2012	Kasihnya Qaseh	Rizman	TV1
2012	Puteri Pulau Tuba		TV2
2012	Diba Benci Abah	Borhan	Astro Prima
2012	Ke Pintu Bahagia	Azmin	TV3
2012	Fatihah Untuk Abah	Dollah	TV3
2012	Mati Hidup Semula	Ayah Lan	Astro Oasis
2013	Bungkusan Leman	Sham	TV2
2013	Delusi	Dato' Hanif	TV9
2013	Mencari Syifa	Hakimi	TV Alhijrah
2013	Lukisan	Deraman	Astro Mustika HD
2013	Qarina	Azimal	TV3
2013	Karma Abah	Nasir	TV3
2014	Titisan Keinsafan	Azzul	TV3
2014	Nasi Air	Pak Rahman	TV3
2015	Penjara Seorang Isteri	Zaid	Astro Oasis
2015	Pendua	Izwan	TV2
2015	Detik	Rauzan	TV3
2015	Aku Kaya Raya Ni	Sudin	Astro Prima
2015	Lorong Kecil Ke Syurga	Azmi	TV9
2015	Jalan Singkat Ke Syurga	Fadil	Astro Oasis
2015	Wan Embong	Omar	TV3
2016	Che Pah Penari Hadrah Terakhir	Che Pah	Astro First Exclusive
2016	Dia Untukku	Adam Mukriz	TV Alhijrah
2016	Ayah Mentuaku	Tuan Haji Abu Zahar	TV9
2016	Dari Asar Ke Isyak	Syukri	TV2
2016	Buku Cinta Abah	Amar	TV3
2016	Syawal Yang Hilang	Pak Ayob	HyppTV
2016	Munajat Suci	Muiz	Astro Prima
2016	Liga Masjid	Pak Tham	Astro Ria
2017	Petanda	Ramlan	TV9
2017	Papa Sayang	Yusuf	HyppTV
2017	Cerita Seram Paya Hitam	Hassan	Astro Ria
2017	Anak Kerak	Hussein	Astro Citra
2018	The Hantus	Yellow Volkswagen Man	Astro First Exclusive
2018	Kelir	Rahman	TV1
2018	Qalbu	Kamal	TV3
2019	Samad Tedung	Samad	TV3
2019	Sesalan Terakhir	Tarmizi	TV3
2019	Dah Mati Pun Cantik	Dr. Malik	Astro Citra
2020	Berdua	Al	TV1
2020	7 Langkah		TV Okey
2020	Nurul Najwa	Tuan Sulaiman	TV1
2020	Takbir Dari Belantara	Tobias	TV1
2022	Orang Minyak Kampung Lenggong	Amir	Astro Citra
2022	Aroma Cinta	Orang Asing	TV1
2023	Demi Masa	Musa	TV3
2024	Titipan Kasih	Rashid	TV3
2024	Isteri Seorang Lelaki		TV1
2024	Mati Hidup Balik	Tok Ayah	Astro Ria
2025	Pondok Abuya	Abuya	TV3

=== Television ===
Year	Title	Role	TV channel
1990	Varia Aidilfitri	Himself	TV1
1999	Kosa Kata	Host	TV1
2015	Gegar Vaganza (Season 2)	Guest jury	Astro Ria
2018	It's Alif	Guest artist	NTV7
2019	Malaysia Hari Ini: Retro Mania	Guest artist	TV3

=== Advertisements ===
Year	Title	Role
2017	Ikhlas	Dad

== Videography ==
=== Music video ===
Year	Title	Role	Singer	Notes
2017	"Cinta Takkan Berakhir"	Surgeon specialist	Anuar Zain	Special appearance

== Discography ==
Single
Year	Song title	Guest singer
2017	"KL Wangan"	Altimet & Pekin Ibrahim
