= Pusaka (film) =

2019 Malaysian Malay-language supernatural horror film

- Theatrical release poster
- Directed by: Razaisyam Rashid
- Written by: Zulaikha Zakaria; Natasha Azlan; Luqman Ghazali
- Screenplay by: Anwari Ashraf; Alfie Palermo
- Story by: Natasha Chopra
- Produced by: Anwari Ashraf; Fatimah Ruzaimi
- Starring: Syafiq Kyle; Mimi Lana; Hafidz Roshdi; Farhanna Qismina; Ogy Ahmad Daud; Faizal Hussein
- Cinematography: Madnor Kassim
- Edited by: Razaisyam Rashid; Safwan Salleh
- Music by: Ricky Lionardi
- Production companies: Astro Shaw; Director's Think Tank; Alpha 47
- Distributed by: Astro Shaw
- Release dates: 31 October 2019 (Malaysia, Singapore, Brunei)
- Running time: 94 minutes
- Country: Malaysia
- Language: Malay
- Budget: MYR 2 Million
- Box office: MYR 13.7 Million

Pusaka (English: Heirloom) is a 2019 Malaysian Malay-language supernatural horror film Co-produced and distributed by Astro Shaw, the film directed by Razaisyam Rashid based on screenplay by Anwari Ashraf and Alfie Palermo with original story by Natasha Chopra. Syafiq Kyle stars as Inspector Nuar Ishak who discovers twins Balqis and Qistina, one dead and one alive, trapped in an abandoned house. Since heading the investigation for this case, Inspector Nuar begins experiencing paranormal disturbances and although he realises his judgement is progressively affected and also has problems with his own twin, Nur, he must solve the case before more lives are lost.

It was released on 31 October 2019 in Malaysia, Singapore and Brunei. The film received positive reaction from viewers for its casts and cinematography by Madnor Kassim. A sequel was already planned by director himself and originally was to be released in 2020. Due to the COVID-19 pandemic, the whole photography was halted.

== Plot ==
Nuar and Nur are twins. Nuar, a skilled police officer, finds his drug-addicted sister Nur hiding in a warehouse after repeatedly leaving her rehabilitation centre. Following an argument, he sends her back to the centre. Shortly afterwards, Nuar is dispatched to investigate the smell of corpses at an abandoned house. Inside, he experiences strange sights and sounds, including the sound of a marble dropping on the floor, but dismisses them. On the second floor, he finds a girl chained to a wall and holding a corpse.

The survivor is identified as Balqis, who had been holding the body of her deceased twin sister, Qistina. The twins are the daughters of Megat Mahmud. Nuar becomes suspicious when he discovers that nobody had reported them missing. After returning home, he begins experiencing supernatural phenomena, including seeing and hearing unexplained things. A ghost grabs his hand, leaving a blue mark.

Later, Balqis becomes possessed and vomits blood. A note reveals that the spirit of Faizah is attacking Khaleeda, prompting Nuar, Lokman and another officer to go to Faizah's house. Nuar attempts to save Khaleeda but is thrown aside by Faizah's spirit. Lokman recites prayers to exorcise the spirit, after which Faizah is arrested.

The following morning, Nuar interviews Faizah at the police station. She becomes possessed again, attacks him and escapes. While Nuar pursues her, she dies in a car accident. Balqis later tells Nuar that their parents also died in a road accident and that Opah had locked the twins in the abandoned house. Faizah had brought them food there, only to discover that Qistina had been killed and that the house contained several skulls.

Nuar is subsequently suspected by ASP Mansor of murdering Opah and Megat Mahmud and is arrested and imprisoned.

At the abandoned house, Nuar and Lokman discover that Khaleeda has been brought there by Balqis. Lokman is attacked by Balqis's spirit, while Nuar encounters Nur and the spirits of Balqis and Nur, who attack him. Nuar shoots Balqis, causing her to fall, but Nur's spirit continues attacking him. A falling cabinet traps Balqis, allowing Nuar to remove her ring before rushing to save Nur. Lokman rescues Khaleeda. Nur is cured, although Nuar is injured.

Two months later, Nuar has recovered and returns to the police force, while Nur has a broken arm. The twins sit together on a bench with Lokman. In the mid-credits scene, Khaleeda boards a bus, but Balqis is revealed to have returned.

== Cast ==
- Syafiq Kyle as Inspector Anuar @ Nuar Ishak
- Mimi Lana as Nuraini @ Nur Ishak
- Hafidz Roshdi as Luqman
- Faizal Hussein as ACP Mansor
- Sweet Qismina as Balqis Megat Mahmud & Qistina Megat Mahmud
- Draman Muhammad as Megat Mahmud
- Ogy Ahmad Daud as Grandmother / Puteri Najwa
- Aleza Shadan as Faizah
- Yuna Rahim as Khaleeda
- Faizul Syaharin as Haikal
- Aloy Paradox as Hanif
- Megat Sharizal as Salman
- Mili Supina as Zulaikha
- Faizul Syaharin as Megat Haikal

== Reception ==
=== Box office ===
Pusaka has grossed over RM 11 Million after 18 days of theatrical release.

=== Critical reaction ===
The film receive positive outcome from viewers. Farhana Jafri written that Pusaka have a great casting and stunning visuals. She also praised for superb audio system. Iylia Adreena written for Rojak Daily verdict that the film offers a fresh new take of horror flicks tackling family issues.

== Future ==
The sequel was already planned by director and was supposed to start their principal photography on 2020. Due to the COVID-19 pandemic, the photography was halted.
