= Syafiq Kyle =

Malaysian actor (born 1992)

- شفيق کاعيل
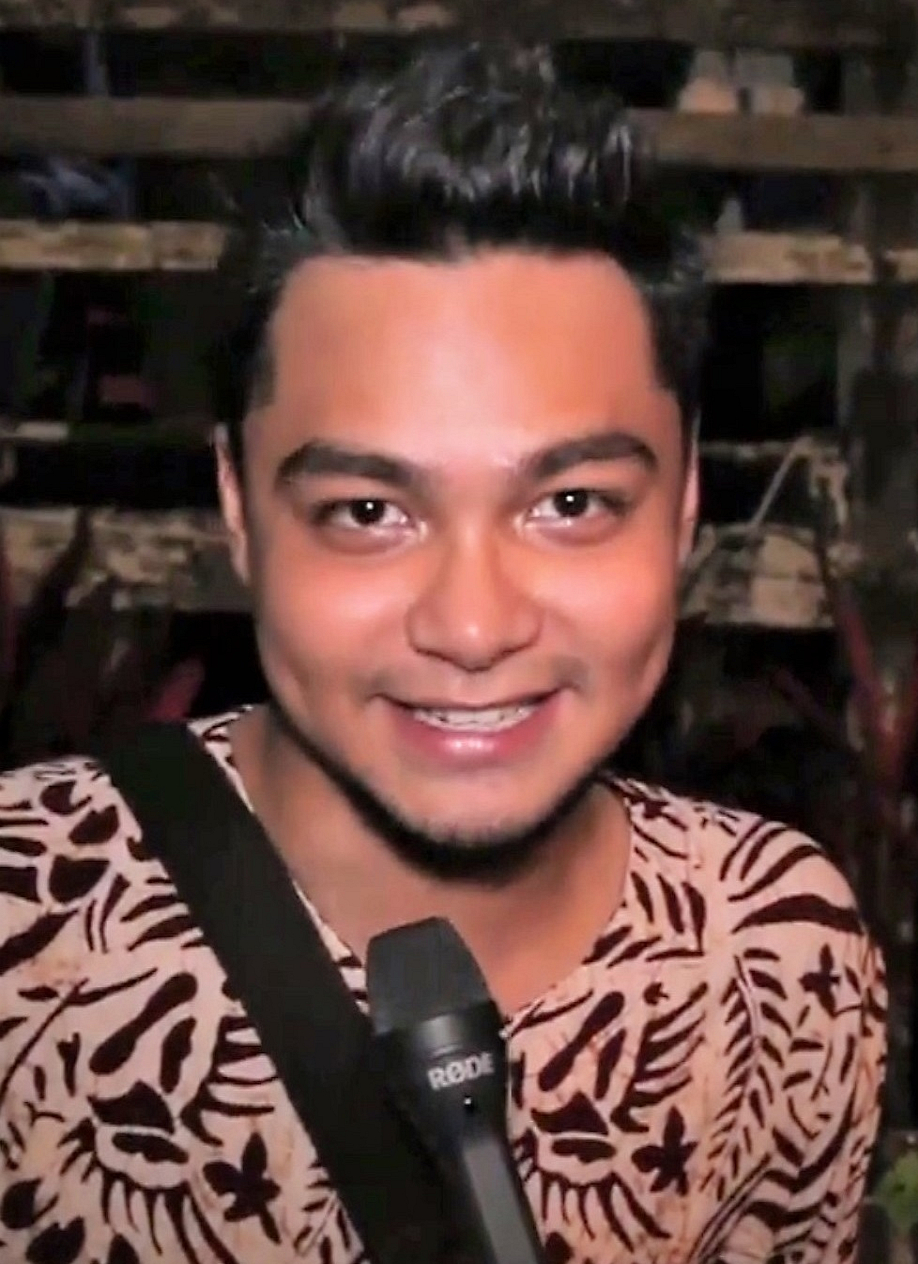
- Syafiq in 2016
- Born: Mohd Syafiq Shamim bin Abdul Razak; 24 June 1992 (age 34); Kuala Lumpur, Malaysia
- Education: Universiti Teknologi Mara (UiTM)
- Occupations: Actor, model, producer
- Years active: 2011–present
- Spouse: Mimi Lana (m. 2025)
- Parents: Abdul Razak Husin (father); Rohaya Sulaiman (mother)
- Relatives: Syazwan Razak (brother)

Mohd Syafiq Shamim bin Abdul Razak (born 24 June 1992), known professionally as Syafiq Kyle, is a Malaysian actor. He is a former contestant on Hero Remaja 2011/12 with Fattah Amin and Saharul Ridzwan, where he earned second place in the competition. Since then, he began active as an actor on film and television.

== Early life ==
He was born on 24 June 1992 as Mohd Syafiq Shamim bin Abdul Razak in Kuala Lumpur. He is the second of three sons.

Syafiq holds a diploma in Communication and Media from Universiti Teknologi MARA (UiTM).

== Career ==
Born in Kuala Lumpur and a graduate in Communication and Media from Universiti Teknologi MARA (UiTM), Syafiq’s career began in 2011 when he participated in the Hero Remaja 2011/2012 competition and finished as the runner-up. Subsequently, his acting career took off with minor roles in several dramas and films. He starred in his first drama, Iparku Diva (2011), but his breakthrough came when he gained recognition for the role of Johan in the drama series Tanah Kubur (2012–2015), appearing in nine seasons. Since then, Syafiq has continued to achieve commercial success through several popular television drama series such as Kerana Terpaksa Aku Relakan (2014), Married Tapi Benci (2016), and Mencintaimu Mr. Photographer (2017), Nur (2018–19), Suara Hati (2021), Seribu Nina (2022), and One Cent Thief (2022–2025). For the drama Nur, co-starring Amyra Rosli, he won the 2018 Anugerah Skrin for Best Actor in a Drama Series and the 2018 Anugerah Drama Festival Kuala Lumpur for Favourite Actor meanwhile for the drama Tak Ada Cinta Sepertimu, co-starring Zahirah MacWilson, he won the 2019 Anugerah MeleTOP Era for MeleTOP Actor.

== Filmography ==
=== Film ===
Year	Title	Role	Notes
2018	Langsuir	Azlan	Debut film
2018	Gol & Gincu Vol. 2	Hakim	
2019	Pusaka	Inspector Anuar @ Nuar Ishak	
2020	Saka Nan Sepi	Sufian	
2021	Mat Bond Malaya	Ejen 8	
2022	Cinta VS Hantu	Young Teacher Ahmad	
2022	Siku 12: Langkah Derhaka	Atid	
2023	Polis EVO 3	Inspector Dani	
2024	The Experts Selamatkan Raya	Khairul	Short film
2024	Sheriff: Narko Integriti	Nazri	
2024	The Experts	Khairul (Keyrol)	
2024	Takluk: Lahad Datu	DSP Zambri	
2025	Blood Brothers	Ariff	
2026	Malaikat Malam	Azam	
2026	Baga	-	As producer
2026	Takluk 2: Ops Daulat	DSP Zambri	
TBA	Blood Brothers 2: Perang Naga	Ariff	Pre-production

=== Television series ===
Year	Title	Role	TV channel	Notes
2008	Gaia (Season 1)	Hantu Shiba	Astro Ria	Episode: "Eh? Apa benda tu? (Part 1)
2011	Iparku Diva	Waiter	Astro Warna	
2011	Terowong	Wan Zaharul	TV3	Episode: "Sesat"
2012–2014	Tanah Kubur	Johan	Astro Oasis	
2013	Kampung Girl	Redhuan	TV3	
2013	Kerana Lelaki Itu	Dr. Tajul	TV9	
2014	Mat Cepat	Jo	TV2	
2014	Anugerah Terindah	Amir	TV3	
2014	Oh My English! (Season 3)	Khai	Astro TVIQ	
2014	Senafas Cinta	Adam	TV1	
2014	Tuan Rumah Pembantu Rumah	Luth	TV3	
2014	Kerana Terpaksa Aku Relakan	Tajul Fahin	TV3	
2014	Bila Hati Berbicara	Emir Qasya	TV3	
2015	Angin Syurga	Ustaz	TV2	
2015	Isteri Separuh Masa	Megat Zafril	Astro Ria	
2015	Dhia Sofea	Din	TV3	
2015	Merah Gaun Pengantin	Faizal	TV1	
2015	Alaa Bib..	Joeran	TV3	
2015	Kifarah Mistik	Syafiq	TV3	Episode: "Celupar"
2016	Married Tapi Benci	Kamal	TV3	
2016	Sekali Aku Jatuh Cinta	Johan	TV3	
2016	Tika Langit Terbuka	Haris	Astro Oasis	Episode: "Si Miskin Pun Terbang"
2017	Suamiku Paling Sweet	Izz Haikal	TV3	
2017	Mencintaimu Mr. Photographer	Nazmi Elyas / Jemy	Astro Ria	
2017	Mocha Kau Bahagia	Firdaus	TV3	
2017	Red Velvet	Jeffry	Astro Ria	
2017	Dekatkan Jarak Kita	Ian Tashriq	TV3	
2018	Mencari Mel & Ayu	Zainuddin	TV1	
2018	Tak Ada Cinta Sepertimu	Hazran Widad	Astro Ria	
2018	Nur	Ustaz Adam	TV3	
2018	Pelangi Cinta	Wan	TV3	
2018	Mocha Kau Bahagia 2	Firdaus	TV3	
2018	Budak Usin	Ustaz Adam	TV3	
2019	Senafas Rindu	Fariz Ashman	Astro Ria	
2019	Nur 2	Ustaz Adam	TV3	
2019	Serikan Hatimu	Adam	TV3	
2019	Bukan Cinta Aku	Tengku Isma	TV3	
2020	Lock In 2	Syafiq	Youtube	
2020	Serikan Hatimu 2	Azrul	TV3	
2021	Diva Popular	Engku Emran	Awesome TV	
2021	Covid Oh Covid	Remy	TV3	
2021	Suara Hati	Haris	Astro Prima	
2021	Lockdown	Hairi	Astro Ria	
2021	Diva Popular 2	Engku Imran	Awesome TV	
2021	Serikan Hatimu 3	Syafiq	TV3	
2022	Seribu Nina	Amar	Viu	
2022	Cinta Buat Dara	Hariz	TV3	
2022–2025	One Cent Thief	Iman Shah	Astro Ria	
2024	I.D.	Bro Malik Alpha	Astro Premier	Special appearance
2024	Terlanjur Cinta	Amir	Viu	
2024	Gadis Masa	Khairi	Viu	

=== Telemovies ===
Year	Title	Role	TV channel	Notes
2011	Tasbih Putih	Zali	Astro Prima	
2012	Anak Ikan	Syafiq	Astro Prima	
2013	Kampungku Aidiladha	Bendi	TV3	
2013	Abang Long Vs Kak Yong	Johan	TV3	
2013	Cinta Laila Majnun	Qalid	Astro Oasis	
2013	Syair Untuk Bonda	Angah	Astro Oasis	
2014	Aki Bangku	Aki Bustamin	TVi	
2014	Dari Pintu Neraka	Zakri	TV3	
2015	Romantika Bulan Madu	Zack	TV3	
2015	Mat Despatch Raya Sakan	Syafiq	TV3	
2015	Gangster Melor	Hariz / Haikal	TV9	
2016	Takraw Kampung	Lan	TV9	
2016	Bapa Mentuaku	Mazlan	TV1	
2016	Jangan Ambil Botol Itu	Nued	TV9	
2016	Syahadah Yang Hilang	Nizam	Astro Citra	
2016	Mat Chia Chia	Arif	TV9	
2016	Bella	Adam	TV9	
2016	Kari Sanjana	Farhan	TV3	
2016	Tawar	Que Dani	TV2	
2016	Kalau Aku Kaya	Din	TV3	
2016	Suamiku Bukan Tukang Masak	Farid	Astro Ria	
2017	Takdir Yang Terhenti	Asif	TV3	
2017	Isteriku Cikguku	Azlan	TV3	
2017	Malam Tanpa Yasin	Yasin	TV3	
2017	Hassan	Fuad	TV3	
2017	Sayang Achu Ketat-Ketat	Irfan Zakri	Hypp Sensasi	
2017	Ada Apa Dengan Ramadhan	Ahnaf	Astro Ria	
2017	Nur 3 Pagi	Fariz	TV3	
2018	Abang Kandung	Usop	TV3	
2018	Manipulasi	Ku Hariz	NTV7	
2018	Taubatku	Ismail	TV3	
2018	Mentari	Firash	TV3	
2018	Pengantin Lari Culik Artis	Jay Johan	Astro Citra	
2018	Syirik	Syafiq	Astro Citra	
2019	Senafas Rindu Raya	Fariz Ashman	Astro Ria	
2019	Shiba Shiba Doo	Shiba	Astro Citra	
2020	Tolong Saya Encik Dinosaur	Karl	Astro Citra	
2020	Artis Lari Culik Pengantin Lah Pulak	Jay Johan	Astro Citra	
2020	Derai	Khalid	TV3	
2020	Cerai	Azim	Astro Citra	
2021	Bukan Cerita Cinta Cliche	Faliq	Astro Citra	
2021	Rompak Raya	Awie	Awesome TV	
2021	Holiday Aji Tom	Jamil	Awesome TV	
2022	Nafsu Mental	Nizam	Astro Citra	
2023	Mendarat Di Syurga	Khalif	TV3	
2023	Seindah Kasih The Movie	Nazmi	Tonton	
2023	Doh	Faiz	Tonton	Also producer

== Videography ==
Music video
Year	Title	Singer
2019	"Semakin"	Siti Sarah

== Awards and nominations ==
Year	Award	Category	Nominated work	Result	Ref.
2012	Hero Remaja 2011/2012	2nd place winner	—N/a	Won	
2014	1st MeleTOP Era Awards	Popular New Artist	—N/a	Nominated	
2015	28th Bintang Popular Berita Harian Awards	Best On Screen Couple (with Atikah Suhaime)	Bila Hati Berbicara	Nominated	
2015	3rd Lawak Warna Awards	Best Comedy Actor – TV	Gangster Melor	Nominated	
2015	19th Skrin Awards	Best Supporting Actor – Drama	Dari Pintu Neraka	Nominated	
2016	Seri Angkasa Awards	Best Supporting Actor – Drama	Dari Pintu Neraka	Nominated	
2017	1st Throwbaek Drama Awards	Most Supporting Actor	Tanah Kubur	Won	
2017	30th Bintang Popular Berita Harian Awards	Most Popular TV Actor	—N/a	Nominated	
2017	1st InTrend Gala Awards	Dream Guy Award	—N/a	Won	
2017	1st Instafamous HurrTV Awards	Instafamous Superhero Award	—N/a	Won	
2018	2nd ERA Digital Muzik Awards	Best Interview of ERA 40 Chart (with Neelofa & Fatin Afeefa)	Red Velvet	Won	
2018	5th MeleTOP Era Awards	Popular TV Actor	Mencintaimu Mr. Photographer	Nominated	
2018	5th MeleTOP Era Awards	Popular Fashion Style	—N/a	Nominated	
2018	5th Kuala Lumpur Drama Festival Awards	Choice Actor	Dekatkan Jarak Kita	Nominated	
2018	5th Kuala Lumpur Drama Festival Awards	Choice On Screen Couple (with Ayda Jebat)	Dekatkan Jarak Kita	Won	
2018	3rd Telenovela Awards	Popular Telenovela Actor	Mencintaimu Mr. Photographer	Nominated	
2018	31st Bintang Popular Berita Harian Awards	Most Popular TV Actor	—N/a	Nominated	
2018	31st Bintang Popular Berita Harian Awards	Best Couple – Drama (with Mawar Rashid)	Suamiku Paling Sweet	Nominated	
2018	31st Bintang Popular Berita Harian Awards	Best Couple – Drama (with Hannah Delisha)	Mencintaimu Mr. Photographer	Nominated	
2018	22nd Skrin Awards	Best Supporting Actor – Drama	Abang Kandung	Nominated	
2018	22nd Skrin Awards	Best Actor – Serial Drama	Nur	Won	
2019	6th Kuala Lumpur Drama Festival Awards	Choice Actor	Nur	Won	
2019	6th Kuala Lumpur Drama Festival Awards	Choice On Screen Couple (with Amyra Rosli)	Nur	Won	
2019	6th MeleTOP Era Awards	Popular TV Actor	Tak Ada Cinta Sepertimu	Won	
2019	6th MeleTOP Era Awards	Popular Film Actor	Langsuir	Won	
2019	6th MeleTOP Era Awards	Popular Fashion Style	—N/a	Won	
2019	7th Stail EH! Awards	Most Stylish Male Celebrities	—N/a	Won	
2019	7th Stail EH! Awards	Sexiest Male Celebrities	—N/a	Nominated	
2019	32nd Bintang Popular Berita Harian Awards	Most Popular Film Actor	Langsuir	Nominated	
2019	32nd Bintang Popular Berita Harian Awards	Best Couple – Film (with Hannah Delisha)	Langsuir	Won	
2019	32nd Bintang Popular Berita Harian Awards	Most Popular TV Actor	Nur	Won	
2019	32nd Bintang Popular Berita Harian Awards	Best Couple – Drama (with Amyra Rosli)	Nur	Nominated	
2019	32nd Bintang Popular Berita Harian Awards	Best Couple – Drama (with Zahirah Macwilson)	Tak Ada Cinta Sepertimu	Nominated	
