= Lubuk Paku =

Lubuk Paku is a small town in Maran District, Pahang, Malaysia. The town is located near Maran town. The main features of this town are the historical Lubuk Paku police station and Pahang River.

== Historical Lubuk Paku police station ==
This historical police station was ambushed and destroyed by Dato' Bahaman, Tok Gajah and Mat Kilau followers during British protectorate in Pahang on early 19th century (1800).
