= Abu Samah Mohd Kassim =

Malaysian politician

Abu Samah Mohd Kassim (February 1926 - 7 April 2009) was a central committee member of the Malayan Communist Party during 1975. He was an important Malay communist in the 1970s.

== Early life ==
Abu Samah was born in the district of Semantan, Temerloh, Pahang. Dato' Bahaman, a well-known Malay leader whom headed the rebellion against British intervention in politics and the administration of Pahang in 1891–1892, is his great-granduncle.

== Involvement in politics ==
During 1946, he joined the nationalist movement and became a member of the Parti Kebangsaan Melayu Malaya and Angkatan Pemuda Insaf. In 1948, he joined the armed struggle for independence through 10th Regiment, the Malayan National Liberation Army. Under the order of Malayan Communist Party, in 1953, he moved from the forest in Pahang to the south of Thailand until 1989, along with the 10th Regiment. From 1969 to 1976, he led the group of troops, around 40 people, to Hulu Kelantan. He had fought with the Malaysian military during Operasi Gonzales.

== Later life ==
At the age of 80, he settled in Sukhirin District, Narathiwat Province, southern Thailand, with Abdullah CD and the former members of the 10th Regiment, who chose not to return to Malaysia.
