= Beto Kusyairy =

Malaysian actor (born 1980)

- Born: Nur Kusyairy Zakuan bin Osman; 19 February 1980 (age 46); Kuala Lumpur, Malaysia
- Occupation: Actor
- Years active: 2001–present
- Spouse: Tisha Shahar (m. 2008)

Nur Kusyairy Zakuan bin Osman (born 19 February 1980), known professionally as Beto Kusyairy, is a Malaysian actor.

== Early life ==
He was born on 19 February 1980 in Kuala Lumpur and holds a Diploma in Hotel Management from University of Technology MARA (UiTM). In an interview with Berita Harian, Beto spoke about the origin of his stage name:

When I was involved in the (2007) film Syaitan, I used the name Kusyairy. It so happened that Rosyam was also acting in the film, so when he saw that I was only using the name Kusyairy, he suggested that I use two names like him. Rosyam said that most actors use two names, while one name is usually used by singers.

I hold on to those words. I'm too lazy to think long. Coincidentally, when I was in school, there was a group. In that group, we each had nicknames. Our names were taken from a Mexican drama about friendship. The only name left at that time was Beto, so close friends called me by that name. So I also used that name as a nickname." A friend of his named Syed Khusairi was Beto's inspiration to become the best actor in the film Istanbul Aku Datang!.

== Career ==
Although not as popular as other male actors at the time, Beto is comfortable with his current situation and admits that popularity is not a priority for him. Beto is very selective about the characters and storylines in every drama or film offered to him because for him, the characters and stories he brings must be scientific, provide lessons and have an impact on the audience.

Before starting his acting career, Beto first built a name for himself as the mascot of Along for the children's educational television series, Along produced by 59 Communications which aired on TV1 in 2001, which was his first step into the world of national entertainment arts.

The drama directed by Erma Fatima became the starting point for Beto Kusyairy to seriously pursue acting, although he played a supporting role before acting in the film Syaitan (film) directed by Bade Hj. Azmi. He was lucky because Kabir Bhatia gave him the opportunity to act in Kekasihku Seru and Juvana (drama). He became the main actor alongside Syazwan Zulkifly, Izreen Azminda, Elfira Loy, Naim Daniel, Shera Aiyob and Izzue Islam in the Astro Ria drama series Jangan Ambil Padang Kami which tells the story of the struggle and adventure of 7 children to save a football field in their flat area from being developed by settlers.

In 2012, he starred in the lead role in the film Istanbul Aku Datang! directed by Bernard Chauly and produced by Red Communications, in which he played the role of Harris. The film also starred Tomok and Lisa Surihani, and was released on 8 December 2012, with part of the filming being filmed in Istanbul, Turkey.

In addition, he acted in a theater play with Cristina Suzanne entitled Ramlee Festasi. This play was held at the Dewan Bahasa dan Pustaka Store from 14 to 16 December 2012 and in 2013 the play was staged again.

He appeared in the telefilm Qadr directed by Faisal Ishak starring alongside Zahiril Adzim which tells the story of a second chance given by God to His servant after being struck by pain. This telefilm premiered on Astro First Exclusive in February 2014. On 12 June 2014, Beto played the role of Suffian, a pizza delivery man who graduated from UiTM in the comedy drama film CEO (film) directed by Razaisyam Rasyid, this film also starred Cristina Suzanne and Remy Ishak. Kemalia Othman from mStar Online said: "...Beto Kusyairy does not want to lose with his unpretentious character and is also able to make the audience laugh and wait for his appearance until the end".

Beto plays the role of Rahim, a street musician in the drama Rubberband which airs on TV3's Iris slot. It also stars Bil Azali and Sara Ali.

In 2016, he acted with Aiman Hakim Ridza and Indonesian actress Tya Arifin in the telefilm Bidadari directed by Osman Ali which aired on Astro Citra's Karya 12 slot, where he played the role of Nathuwi.

Beto's career in Singapore began in the same year by starring in the drama Kisah Tok Kadi which aired on MediaCorp Suria. Through this drama, he was recognized as the Best Male Actor at Malam Pesta Perdana 2017, thus opening up a bigger space in the Lion City country.

Working under the direction of Syamsul Yusof, Beto played the lead role in the historical biopic film Mat Kilau which tells the story of the struggle of the famous Malay warrior, Mat Kilau. The Mat Kilau biopic also stars Dato' Adi Putra, Fattah Amin, Johan As'ari, Farid Amirul, A. Galak, Yayan Ruhian and new star, Ali Karimie.

Beto is one of the actors who made the online drama KL Gangster: Underworld co-directed by Syafiq Yusof and Faisal Ishak successful including Azhan Rani, Nabila Huda, Zahiril Adzim, Ezzaty Abdullah and others. KL Gangster: Underworld which is a rendition of the KL Gangster trilogy by Syamsul Yusof began airing on iflix on 16 August 2018; playing the role of Shah.

== Filmography ==
=== Film ===
Year	Title	Role	Notes
2007	Syaitan	Mahmud	
2008	KAMI The Movie	Haron	
2011	Sini Ada Hantu	Farid	
2011	Nur Kasih The Movie	Ustaz Wahid	
2011	Jalan Pintas	Boss	
2012	Sesuatu Yang Tertinggal	Fakri	
2012	Chow Kit	Mojo	
2012	Jiwa Taiko	Agos	
2012	Istanbul Aku Datang!	Harris	
2014	CEO	Sufian	
2014	Dollah Superstar	Himself	
2014	Gila Baby	Bob	
2015	Bravo 5	Trooper Karim	
2017	Balun	Hassan	
2017	Bisik Pada Langit	Zaidi	
2020	Aku Bukan Gila	Andre	
2021	Frontliner	Inspector Zul	
2022	Mat Kilau	Wahid	
2022	Anak Rimau The Movie	Zainal	
2022	Seratus		Cameo appearance
2022	Halimun	Zahir	
2023	Imaginur	Zuhal	
2023	MagiK	Harris	
2024	Telekinesis	Razak	
2024	Reversi	Akid	
2025	Gayong	Teacher Meor Abdul Rahman	
2025	Mencari Ramlee		
2026	Gayong 2	Teacher Meor Abdul Rahman	
2026	Chelot	Corporal Azraf	

=== Short films ===
Year	Title	Role	Production
2014	Hujan Panas		
2014	Cage (Sangkar)		
2014	Cerita Satu Malam		
2015	Nadia	Jarr	
2015	Putus	Korporal Ezir	Kicapi Productions Sdn Bhd
2015	PetronasRaya 2015: Sampai Hati	Abang	Petronas
2016	Buku Ayah	Hamzah	I&P Group Sdn Berhad
2016	Bunga Bangsa	Amin	I&P Group Sdn Berhad
2016	Erti Raya	Abu	Maghfirah Media Group & Pintu Pictures Sdn Bhd
2020	3 Penjuru	Harjo Wings	TV RTM
2023	Tetamu		Era Food MY
2024	Misi Ainaa		Ainaa Beauty
2024	Mak	Helmi	Elrah World
2024	Silat Raya		ASDF Worldwide
2024	Potret		Adabi
2024	Duit Raya Fazli	Fazli	BHPetrol
2024	Janji Amir	Amir	Agrobank
2024	PenJAGA	Faizul	Petronas

=== Television series ===
Year	Title	Role	TV channel	Notes
2008	Lima	Zahim	Astro Ria	
2008	Kekasihku Seru	Dr Hakim	TV3	
2008	Bilik No 13 (Season 2)	Muzakir	TV2	Episode: "Bunian"
2009	Warkah Terakhir: Rosli Dhoby	Rosli Dhoby	Astro Citra	8 episodes
2009	10: Mokhtar Dahari	Riduan	Astro Citra	
2009	Lembing & Layang: Senoi Praaq		Astro Citra	
2009	Mencari Nur Khadijah		TV1	
2010	K.I.T.A	Rizal	Astro Ria	
2010	Pusaka		TV2	
2010	Apa Dosaku: Sybil Kathigasu	Mat Yunus	Astro Citra	
2010	Dendam Kesuma: Tun Fatimah		Astro Citra	
2010	Putra Pura			
2011	Geng Surau	Razif/Mayat	Astro Oasis	
2011	Juvana	Ariffin	TV3	
2011	Cita & Cinta	Fiq	TV9	
2011	Wasiat	Sofiyan Abdullah	Astro Prima	
2012	Pelangi Kasih	Zafrul	TV3	
2012	Jangan Ambil Padang Kami	Zain	Astro Ria	
2012	Sirrun	Zaid	TV9	
2013	Hanya Pada Mu	Tuan Amran	TV3	
2014	Roboh	Ahsan	TV2	
2014	PLAN B	King	TV3	
2014	Kifarah (Season 1)	Man	TV3	Episode: "Man Kedekut"
2014	Kifarah (Season 2)	Bidin	TV3	Episode: "Panjang Tangan"
2015	Sayap Jibril	Khairul	Astro Oasis	Special appearance
2016–2018	Kisah Tok Kadi	Ustaz/Tok Kadi Shahrul	MediaCorp Suria	
2018	KL Gangster: Underworld	Shah	Iflix	
2019	Sembil9n	Azim	Astro First Eksklusif	
2020	KL Gangster: Underworld 2	Shah	WeTV	
2020	Bougainvillea	Adrian	TV3	
2021	Lockdown	Malik	Astro Ria	
2021	Penghulu Interim	Borhan	Awesome TV	
2022	Scammer 2	Taqriz	Astro Ria	
2023	Bunga, Aku Tunggu	Kamal Imran	TV3	
2023	Super Wira	Kapten Gemilang / Johan	Astro Ceria	
2023	Nak Dengar Cerita Hantu?		DEGUP	

=== Telemovie ===
Year	Title	Role	TV channel
2008	Tersasar di Jalanmu		TV1
2009	6 Sharifah	Syed	Astro Ria
2010	Manggah Runggah		TV1
2010	Bila Merpati Terbang Malam	Inspector Suffian	TV2
2011	Rel Waktu	Pak Ghani	TV2
2011	Uri	Rahmat	Astro Box Office Movies Tayangan Hebat
2011	Kashaf Imani	Kashaf	Astro Ria
2011	Lari Sayang Lari		Astro Ria
2011	Pontianak: 3 Cerita 3 Sutradara	Joe (Segment: Misteri Gua Musang)	Astro Ria
2011	Sesungguhnya	Anuar	
2011	Takbur Seorang Isteri	Zukri	TV9
2011	Pencari Jalan Lurus	Mustaqim	TV Alhijrah
2011	Ibu Mak Mama Mummy Ummi		
2011	Pasukan Gerak Cepat		
2012	Runtuhnnya Sebuah Dosa	Daniel	TV3
2012	Selagi Masih Ada	Harith	Astro Citra
2012	Janji Jujur Sepi	Danny	TV9
2012	Aku Mahu Terbang	Abang angkat Rezki	TV3
2012	Aku, Dia dan Tong Sampah	Amir Haikal	TV9
2012	Jujur Aku Dayus	Edree	TV3
2012	Selagi Cinta Berzikir	Fazli	TV1
2013	Aku Bukan Malaikat		TV3
2013	Arman	Arman	TV3
2013	Bayangan Rindu Part 1 & 2	Umar Aisy / Kiew	Astro Box Office Movies Tayangan Hebat
2013	Qadr		Astro First Exclusive
2013	Darjat Tembok Batu		TV1
2014	Nota Untuk Sang Awan	Arman	TV2
2014	Hitam	Hitam	TV3
2014	Sekali Sayang		TV3
2014	Kakak		TV3
2014	Kasih Ayah		TV Alhijrah
2014	P.I - Private Investigator	Sam	TV3
2014	Jahil	Amal	Astro Oasis
2015	Dr. Rushdi		TV2
2015	Hantu BlueRey	Zizan	Astro Ria
2015	Aku, Dia dan Tong Gas	Amir Haikal	TV9
2015	3 Nota	Kopak	Astro Maya HD
2015	Lara Perindu	Mat Di @ Mursyidi Ramli	Astro Maya HD
2015	Ada Sejadah Panjang Terbentang	Taufik	TV9
2015	Ramadan Berteduh Syawal	Khairol	TV3
2016	Bidadari		
2016	Jam Aju Tanpa Jarum	Amran	TV2
2016	Mencari Kaamatan di Gombunan		TV1
2016	Kembali Kepada Fitrah	Hisyam	TV2
2016	Sirat Al-Mustaqeem	Megat	Astro Oasis
2016	Tumbangkan Masjid Al-Ansar	Alif	Astro Oasis
2017	Azam Yang Terlampau	Amri	TV2
2017	Muliakah Aku	Zaidi	TV9
2017	Playboy di Mindarku	Fahmi	TV9
2017	Aku, Mawar dan Makhluk Asing	Bart	Astro Mustika HD
2017	Kita Bukan Anjing	Kiman	Astro Mustika HD
2017	Gadis Kosmos	Bart	Astro Mustika HD
2017	13 Tiang Cinta	Ustaz Imran	TVi
2018	Esok Untuk Kita	Hisyam	NTV7
2018	Terlakur Cinta Suci	Aqrudin	TV3
2018	Cinta Elevator	Adam	Astro Citra
2021	Sihir Pemisah	Musyid	Astro Citra
2021	Hello Suria		Awesome TV
2021	Diam Tanda Setuju		Astro Citra
2022	Lebai Sampan	Iskandar	Astro Citra
2022	Rekah Di Jari Kak Long	Syafik	TV2
2022	Abah	Radzi / Along	TV1
2023	Kum	Imran	Tonton

=== Television ===
Year	Title	Role	TV channel
2001	Along	Maskot/Dil Pagar	TV1
