= Mat Kilau (film) =

2022 Malaysian film

Mat Kilau: The Rise of a Warrior
- Directed by: Syamsul Yusof
- Screenplay by: Syamsul Yusof; Shahruddin Dali; Rizal Ashraf
- Produced by: Rahman Dali; Shahruddin Dali
- Starring: Adi Putra; Beto Kusyairy; Fattah Amin; Yayan Ruhian; Johan As'ari; Geoff Andre Feyaerts
- Cinematography: Rahimi Maidin
- Edited by: Syamsul Yusof
- Music by: Santosh Logandran
- Production company: Studio Kembara Sdn Bhd
- Distributed by: Skop Productions Sdn Bhd
- Release dates: 23 June 2022 (Malaysia, Singapore & Brunei); 31 August 2022 (Indonesia)
- Running time: 120 minutes
- Country: Malaysia
- Languages: Malay; English
- Budget: MYR 8 million
- Box office: MYR 100 million

Mat Kilau: The Rise of a Warrior (Malay: Mat Kilau: Kebangkitan Pahlawan) is a 2022 Malaysian epic biographical action drama film that is inspired by historical events directed by Syamsul Yusof, starring Adi Putra as Mat Kilau bin Imam Rasu, a Malay warrior who fought the British colonialists during the Pahang Uprising in Pahang, British Malaya before independence. The film features Beto Kusyairy, Fattah Amin, Yayan Ruhian, Geoff Andre Feyaerts and Johan As'ari in supporting roles.

The film is set in 1892 when Pahang was under British colonial rule. The film was produced by Rahman Dali, Shahruddin Dali, and Yusof Haslam. Filming began in 2018 and reportedly ended in 2021. The film was co-produced by Studio Kembara Sdn Bhd, and Skop Productions Sdn Bhd.

The official poster of Mat Kilau: The Rise of a Warrior was unveiled on 13 May 2022, while its official trailer was released on 16 June 2022. The film preview ceremony was held at Golden Screen Cinemas (GSC) on the same date. The film was officially released on 23 June 2022.

The film was a commercial success and an audience hit. Produced on a budget of RM8 million, the film grossed RM100 million after 40 days, making it the highest grossing Malaysian film of all time. The film received moderate reviews, but attracted controversy over its depictions of non-Malay characters and promoting Malay ethnonationalism.

== Summary ==
Events of the movie is set in 1892, during British colonial rule in Pahang, three years prior to the formation of the Federated Malay States.

The British exploited the wealth of Pahang's produce belonging to the Malays, by imposing taxes on traders and reaping the produce of the people, as well as interfering in their customary and religious affairs.

The actions taken by the British were done without the consent of the Malays in Pahang, causing them to act against the British in retaliation.

In spirit of defending his homeland of Pahang and freeing it from further occupation, Mat Kilau, a Malay warrior, along with his father, Tok Gajah, and his friends, fought against the British administration.

Conflict and political pressure were faced by the British; and following a plan of resistance by Mat Kilau and his friends, they ultimately clashed with the British in armed battle to determine the fate of Pahang.

== Cast ==
- Adi Putra as Mat Kilau
- Beto Kusyairy as Wahid
- Fattah Amin as Awang
- Johan As'ari as Yassin
- Rahim Razali as Imam Bottoqh
- Jalaluddin Hassan as Haji Muhammad
- Nam Ron as Haji Sulong
- Farah Ahmad as Yang Chik
- Wan Hanafi Su as Imam Rasu/Tok Gajah
- Yayan Ruhian as Toga
- Ali Karimie as Brahim
- Zarina Zainoordin as Rokiah
- Shaharuddin Thamby as Dato' Bahaman
- Khir Rahman as Usup
- Ellie Suriati as Salmah
- Siraj Alsagoff as Shidu
- A. Galak as Pak Deris
- Farid Amirul as Goh Hoi
- Mubarak Majid as Father Yassin
- Z. Zamri as Hitam
- Geoff Andre Feyaerts as Captain Syers
- Harith Haziq as Omar
- Wan Suhaimi as Kelubi
- Megat Terawis as Mat Hassan
- Awie Bakri as Haji Ali
- Mark Geoffrry as J.P. Rodger
- David Abraham as Sir Hugh Clifford
- Dennis Arthur as Professor Cameron

== Production ==
Mat Kilau: The Rise of a Warrior became the first film directed by Syamsul Yusof in which he did not act. In August 2017, he announced his intention to direct an epic film about the history of national heroes. He had previously taken up the challenges of working on the script after several production companies and directors allegedly failed to complete the filming of the historical film as well as the struggle over Mat Kilau.

On the night of the KL Special Force film gala in Petaling Jaya on 8 March 2018, Syamsul announced the directing of a historical biographical film revolving around a Malay warrior who opposed the British administration in Pahang, Mat Kilau.

The film officially underwent filming on 1 April 2018 but had to be stopped for a while due to certain unavoidable problems. Singaporean actor Adi Putra plays the role of Mat Kilau. According to Syamsul, Adi was chosen for the main character because he was able to animate the character and confident that he, as an experienced actor, would carry the character well.

In August 2018, filming of the film was stopped due to internal problems before resuming in October. In June 2020, it was reported that the filming of the film was almost completed, and in February 2021, the film was reportedly completed but its screening had to be postponed due to COVID-19 pandemic.

On 15 May 2022, the actual cost of completing the film was revealed to have cost RM8 million. The film underwent 100 days of filming, with some of it shot in Perak and several other locations, including Pahang, Melaka, and Selangor.

== Release ==
The release poster for Mat Kilau: The Rise of a Warrior was released on 13 May 2022. The film held its premiere at Golden Screen Cinemas (GSC) on 23 June 2022. Its official trailer was also released on the same day. It began streaming internationally on Netflix on September 16, 2022 (Malaysia Day).

== Reception ==
=== Box office ===
As of July 7, 2022, Mat Kilau: The Rise of a Warrior became the highest-grossing local film of all time in Malaysia, breaking the record set by Munafik 2 in 2018.

== Controversy ==
=== Ties to far-right group ===
The film attracted controversies due to revelations of its funding and links to key people from ultra-conservative group Malaysian Muslim Solidarity (producer Abdul Rahman Mat Dali being a former president) leading to scrutiny over the possible intention of the film as a whole to propagate ethnonationalism by depicting of Malays as flawless heroes whilst portraying Chinese, Javanese and Indian characters as outright villains. Sikh groups criticised the film and accused the film of depicting non-Muslims as villains, and suggested that the film could generate religious or racial tensions. In Free Malaysia Today, Kua Kia Soong criticised the film, describing it as exemplifying Malay ethnonationalism and depicting numerous ethnic stereotypes.

Malaysian political science scholar Azmil Tayeb had written an article elaborating the connection of the Solidarity's ideology and its main figures with the film's production for the ISEAS – Yusof Ishak Institute journal Fulcrum, but he however was later forced to withdraw the piece after subsequent harassment by Malaysian far right groups.

== Sequel ==
In July 2022, it was announced that the script for a sequel had already been written, and a storyline was ready for a proposed spin-off film.

A sequel/spin-off, Pendekar Awang: Darah Indera Gajah (English: Warrior Awang and Master Tok Gajah), was released in Malaysia on 11 January 2024. The film follows the exploits of Mat Kilau's allies Awang and Tok Gajah but does not feature Mat Kilau himself; however the film will also serve as a prequel to Mat Kilau 2.
