= Bravo 5 =

- Directed by: Yeop Hitler
- Screenplay by: Yeop Hitler
- Story by: Major Zainal Hayat
- Based on: Diary Mission Command
- Produced by: Nik Nur Ashikin; Nik Abdul Majid
- Starring: Beto Kusyairy; Remy Ishak; Soffi Jikan; Chew Kin Wah
- Cinematography: Madnorkassim
- Edited by: Dora Mahadi; Muhd Kamarul Ariffin Zazali
- Music by: Edrie Hashim
- Production company: Karyaprima Production
- Distributed by: Empire Film Solution
- Release date: 10 September 2015
- Running time: 77 minutes
- Country: Malaysia
- Language: Malay
- Budget: MYR 4.5 Million
- Box office: MYR 20000000(target), RM 374000(first 12 days)

Bravo 5 is a Malaysian Malay-language action war film directed by Yeop Hitler and starring Beto Kusyairy, Remy Ishak, Soffi Jikan, Sashi Tharan, Xavier Fong, Frank Peterson and Chew Kin Wah. The film tells the story of five commandos of the Malaysian Army's Special Service Group trying to curb the rise of MCP terrorist operations. Bravo 5 was released on 10 September 2015. The film was dedicated to the fighters who were killed during the Malaysian Second Emergency/Insurgency (1968-1989).

== Plot ==
In 1989, the Communist Party is planning to dominate the strategic position of the central region. Five members of the Army Special Service Group have been ordered to prevent this from happening. Lieutenant Azri (Remy Ishak), newly married to Aida (Siti Saleha), is named the leader of the four other members, Trooper Karim (Beto Kusyairy), Corporal Morgan (Sashi Tharan), Corporal Ah Chia (Xafier Fong) and Sergeant Unya (Frank Petterson).

The film follows the troop as they each face and then put aside their personal issues to focus on the mission, defend their village and their loved ones, and return safely or to die with honor.

== Cast ==
- Beto Kusyairy as Trooper Karim
- Remy Ishak as Lieutenant Azri
- Sashi Tharan as Corporal Morgan
- Xavier Fong as Corporal Ah Chia
- Frank Peterson as Sergeant Unya
- Faril Desa as Coperal Kamal, a Royal Malay Regiment rifleman who was captured and tortured by Lim Yatt
- Chew Kin Wah as Lim Yatt, commander of an Armed Worked Forces' Assault Group MCP
- Soffi Jikan as Sidek Tapa, the assistant commander to Lim Yatt
- Siti Saleha as Aida (Lt.Azri's wife)
- Tasha Shilla as Nadia, Trooper Karim's ex-girlfriend
- Adeline Tsen as Sergeant Unya's Wife
- Kuswadinata as Haji Manaf, the father of Lieutenant Azri
- Normah Damanhuri as Haji Manaf's Wife
- Uncle Muniandy as Father of Corporal Morgan
- Jobot as Nadia's fiancee
- Captain Mad Nor Bond as the Commanding Officer of the 21st Special Services Group or 21 Gerup Gerak Khas

== Production ==
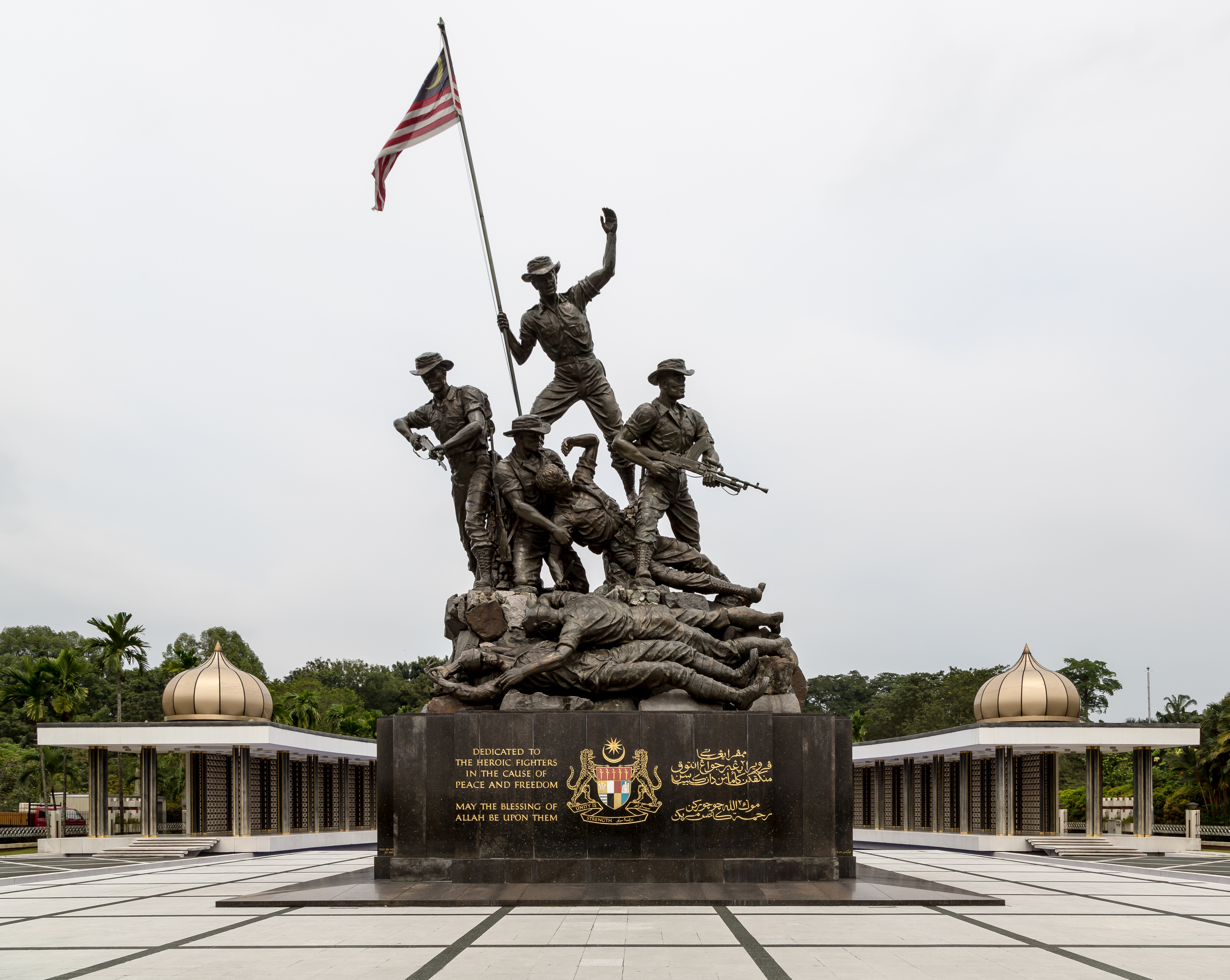
National Monument is one of the filming locations for the movie

Bravo 5 received the support of Ministry of Defense and Malaysian Army.

The pre-launch of this film was made on 9 April 2012. The film changed director three times: Fauzi Nawawi, Saudi Khalid and finally Yeop Hitler. Five key actors underwent intensive training for two weeks at a commando base at Camp Sungai Udang, Malacca. Twelve stunt people were brought from Singapore and China. Approximately 65 to 70 percent of the film's action involved the services of 120 soldiers of the Malaysian Armed Forces.

Screenwriter Major Zainal Hayat revised the script as many as 26 times for the quality and originality of the story to be conveyed. "It took me quite a while to set up this script. The first draft only took three weeks to complete, unchanged since June 2007." The filming took place in National Monument, Singapore, Malacca. The film was originally scheduled to be released in 2013 before being pulled in 2014. It finally premiered in 2015.
