= Tya Arifin =

Indonesian actress (born 1994)

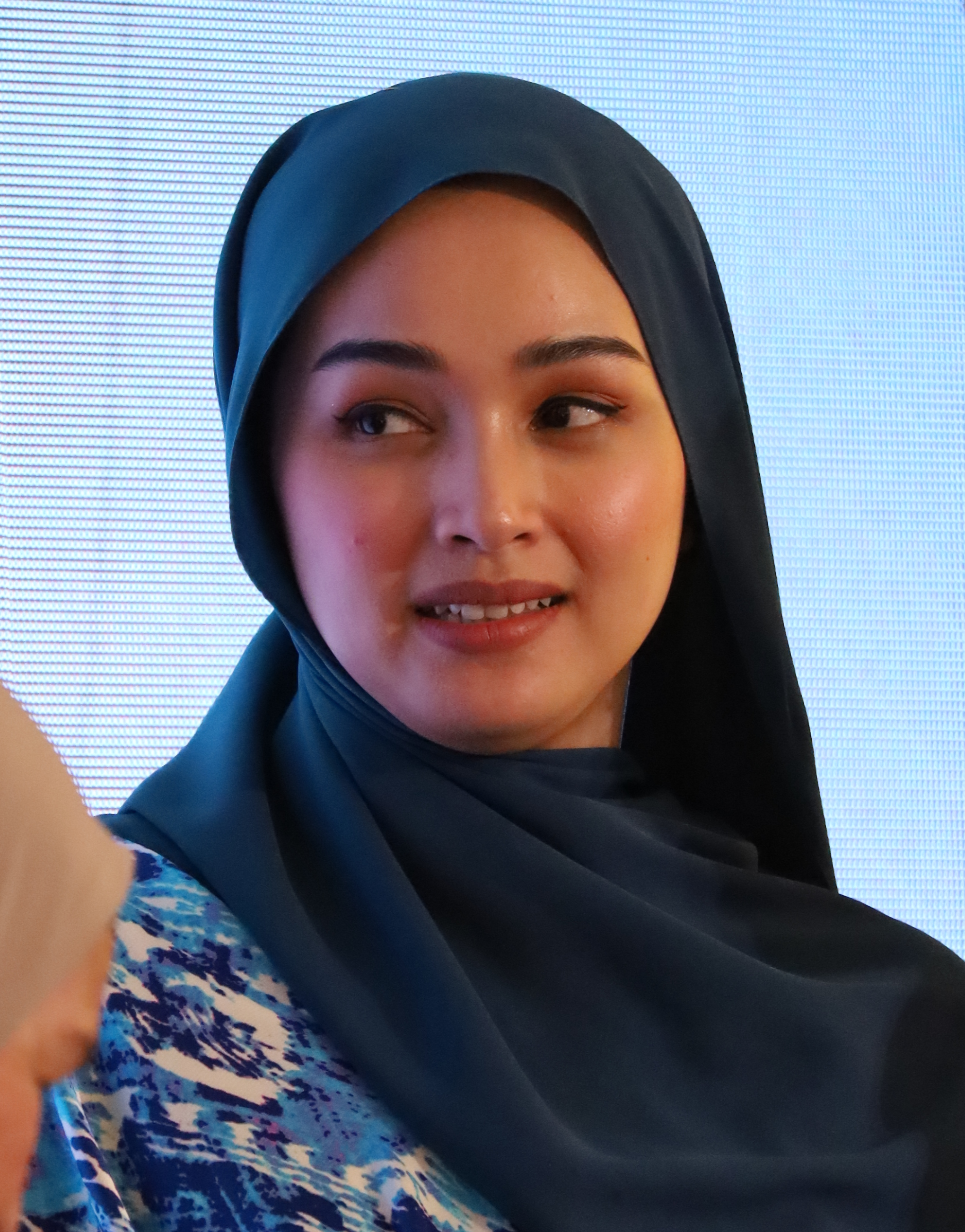
- Arifin in 2025
- Born: Nurtria Wulandari binti Arifin; 22 October 1994 (age 31); Palembang, South Sumatra, Indonesia
- Occupations: Actress; singer; host
- Years active: 2011–present
- Spouse: Asyraf Khalid (m. 2015)
- Children: 2
- Parent(s): Arifin bin Hasan AS (father); Komariah binti Mahmud (mother)

Nurtria Wulandari binti Arifin (born 22 October 1994) is an Indonesian actress and step-daughter-in-law of singer Dato' Sri Siti Nurhaliza. Tya began her acting career in the film Gending Sriwijaya in 2012 and began her music career in 2013 with the song "Bawalah Aku". She is also talented in beatboxing and actively sells herbal medicine.

== Career ==
Tya Arifin's acting career began in 2011. He was offered to act in the film Gending Sriwijaya directed by Hanung Bramantyo starring Julia Perez (allahyarhamah), Agus Kuncoro, Slamet Rahardjo and Jajang C. Noer which was aired on 10 January 2013.

In 2013, he recorded his first solo single titled "Bawalah Aku" created by Anang Hermansyah.

Tya starred in two soap operas in 2015—Para Pencari Tuhan for broadcast on SCTV and Pension Thugs for RCTI. In 2016, he acted with Aiman Hakim Ridza and Beto Kusyairy in the telefilm Bidadari directed by Osman Ali which was broadcast in the Karya 12 slot Astro Citra, where he played the role of Cendana. Tya also recorded the soundtrack for the telefilm with the same title.

She hosts the show In Love With Tya which focuses on her life and career, which began airing on Naura starting 8 April 2019.

As an entrepreneur, she sells herbal products inherited from her ancestors, under the Mutyara Beauty brand.

Tya will appear in the investigative film, Misi Operasi X, playing the role of Fifi, Don Pedro's lover, played by Ebi Kornelis. The film also stars Zaidi Omar, Radhi Khalid, Shareeta Selvaraj and Adam Shahz.

== Activism ==
In August 2019, Tya was appointed by Hospital Kuala Lumpur (HKL) as the 2019 Breastfeeding Celebrity Icon. She said of her appointment: "It is an honour and a source of pride for me to receive this recognition. HKL knows how my journey as a mother who is determined to breastfeed her child has been. It is indirectly a great responsibility for me to disseminate correct information to the public,".

== Personal life ==
She married Malaysian businessman, Asyraf Khalid who is also the third child of Khalid Mohamad Jiwa and stepdaughter of Siti Nurhaliza on 1 November 2015 and blessed with a son named Arif Jiwa who was born on 31 March 2017. The couple divides their time between Jakarta, Indonesia and Kuala Lumpur, Malaysia.

In January 2019, Tya announced the birth of her second child. On 8 May, she and her husband, Asyraf, were blessed with their second child, a girl named Azzahra Jiwa.

== Filmography ==
=== Films ===
Year	Title	Character	Notes
2013	Gending Sriwijaya		
2013	Merry Go Round		
2013	Tak Sempurna		
2013	King of Rock City		
2014	2014		
2014	EARTHBOUND: Aceh Tsunami Tragedy		Short film
2015	Garuda Superhero		
2015	Gila and Jiwa		
2019	Preman Pensiun	Coming soon	
2019	M.O.X: Operation Mission X	Fifi	

=== Sinetron ===
Year	Title	Character	TV station	Note
2014	Jamesbond			
2015	Para Pencari Tuhan		SCTV	
2015	Preman Pensiun	Kinanti	RCTI	

=== Telefilm ===
Year	Title	Character	TV Channel	Notes
2016	Bidadari	Cendana	Astro Citra	First performance in Malaysia
2016	Perempuan Disarung Ungu	Marziah	Astro Ria	

=== Television ===
Year	Title	TV Channel	Notes
2018	Maharaja Lawak Mega 2018	Astro Warna	Jury
2018	MeleTOP	Astro Ria	Guest host
2019	MeleTOP	Astro Ria	Guest artist
2019	In Love With Tya	Naura HD	

=== Theater ===
Year	Title	Role
2015	Bawang Merah Bawang Putih	Melor

== Discography ==
Single
Year	Title
2013	"Bring Me"
2016	"Angel"

== Awards and nominations ==
Year	Awards	Category	Results
2014	KPID Award 2014	Commendable Female Character Cast	Won
2015	Bandung Film Festival 2015	Commendable Female Cast of Soap Opera Series	Nominated
