= Dato' Bahaman =

Malaysian rebel

Abdul Rahman bin Tuanku Imam Nuh (also known as Dato' Bahaman) was a nobleman and famous Malay warrior best known for his role in the Pahang Uprising (1891–1895) in Pahang, Malaysia during the period of British protectorate. Dato' Bahaman was an Orang Besar Raja – a fief of the Sultan of Pahang.

He is also the great-grandfather of a famous revolutionary figure namely Abu Samah Mohd Kassim, also a fighter who later became a member of the Central Committee of the Communist Party of Malaya and a left nationalist in the Malayan National Liberation Army.

== Origin ==
Dato' Bahaman is the son of Tuanku Imam Nuh who hails from Bangkinang, Kampar, Sumatera. Dato Bahaman was said to be adopted by the then-Bendahara (viceroy) of Pahang, Tun Ali, and was a playmate to the future Sultan Ahmad during his childhood. Dato' Bahaman swore an oath of loyalty to Sultan Ahmad when he took the throne in 1881, pledging to serve his homeland.

== Titles and roles ==
Dato' Bahaman was appointed as one of the Orang Besar Berlapan ("8 traditional sub-chiefs") and was awarded the title name Dato Setia Perkasa Pahlawan Semantan for his leadership abilities as an admiral during the Pahang Civil War from 1857 to 1863. He was also rewarded for his assistance towards Tengku Kudin in the civil war in Selangor.

Dato' Bahaman was later appointed as Orang Kaya Semantan by Sultan Ahmad. With that appointment, Dato' Bahaman was granted equal status as the Orang Besar Berempat ("4 traditional chiefs" or "magnates") and became the Sultan's close advisor.

== Semantan war ==
British intervention in Pahang in the late 19th century soon caused the dissatisfaction of traditional magnates in the state. Tensions broke out in December 1890 when an E.A Wise, a British officer, set up a police station without prior permission in Lubuk Terua (in present day Temerloh constituency), which was within the fiefdom of Dato' Bahaman.

When Hugh Clifford, commander of British officers in Pahang learned about the situation, he advised the Sultan to transfer Dato' Bahaman to another province while the British officers conduct an investigation. The Sultan immediately recalled Dato' Bahaman to Kuantan. However, Dato' Bahaman did not heed the order; the Sultan subsequently sacked him as Orang Kaya Semantan.

The action of the Sultan angered Dato' Bahaman. He then ambushed C.E.M Deaborough in an attack near the Semantan River on 15 December 1891. Expecting arrest, Dato' Bahaman later learned that Deaborough's forces had lost retreated to Temerloh city.

British forces in Pahang soon rallied their forces to quell the rebellion. Subsequently, a squadron led by Hugh Clifford and Tengku Mahmud attacked Kampung Kelubi which was the second stronghold of Dato' Bahaman. Here another battle happened between the British forces and Dato' Bahaman. The resulting battle was a loss for the British but a victory for Dato' Bahaman.

== British Hunt ==
In January 1892, the British officers forced Sultan Wan Ahmad to end the uprising of Dato' Bahaman in Pahang. A team was formed and given the name "Gerakan Tentera" or in English "soldier forces". The force was mobilized on 22 January 1892 with the strength of 800 men. It was estimated that 140 of the men carried fire arms and was led by Tengku Ali, Rodger (British officer), Admiral Garang Yusof, Admiral Saiyid Ali Badoh and Admiral Abdullah from Bera. These forces found failure besides just destroying 11 small fortresses including Batu Ampar Fortress. Dato' Bahaman was not found and there were no signs that he and his followers were nearby the area. On early February 1892, the rebellion had ended. The Semantan state was temporarily under the care of Abdullah Bera.

In March 1892, a squadron commanded by Dato' Bahaman successfully recaptured Lubuk Terua. The resistance of Dato' Bahaman became stronger after being helped by his friend, Tok Gajah. The British forces once more lost, outnumbered and with Abdullah Bera's order, they retreated to Bera. The Fortress of Lubuk Terua was well guarded by Malay soldiers from Cempaka and Buluh. The fortress was repeatedly attacked by the British forces.

In May 1892, a British expeditionary force attacked the Fortress of Lubuk Terua again and successfully captured the fort. The Pahang warriors had no choice but to retreat and rally their forces once more in the state of Kelantan and Terengganu. In Terengganu, an ulama named Tok Ku Paluh convinced the Pahang warriors to fight for their homeland and retake Pahang from the British. In June 1894, Kuala Tembeling and Jeram Ampai was successfully conquered by Dato' Bahaman and one hundred Semantan warriors.

In June 1894 a British squadron led by General Walker ambushed a group of Semantan warriors led by Dato' Bahaman, Tok Gajah, Mat Kilau and Mat Kelubi at Jeram Ampai, Kuala Tembeling, Pahang. During the ambush an Administrator of Ulu Pahang named Wise, was killed together with four police officers. The attack caused Mat Kilau, the son of Tok Gajah to retreat to the state of Kelantan. This was followed by the end of the war against the British in Pahang.

Sir Hugh Clifford, British officer in Pahang launched a mass attack on the remaining Semantan forces in Terengganu and Kelantan that swallowed large amounts of funds.

The Semantan forces ended in November 1895 when Dato' Bahaman, Pawang Nong and Mat Lela surrendered themselves to the Siamese government but given protection and were placed at Chiengmai early 1896. Tok Gajah and Mat Kilau were presumed dead by the British during the battle in Terrenganu.

The rise of Dato' Bahaman which lasted for three years (1891–1894) had caused the British forces in Peninsular Malaysia to lose large amounts of money from the treasury. Sultan Ahmad had to pay 720 000 a year to solve the debt.

== Sworn of Loyalty ==
Since that it is no longer safe in Pahang, Kelantan and Terengganu, Dato' Bahaman and his followers decided to retreat to Siam. Before that, an oath was made at Kg. Bukit Haji Pak Jedih, Tanah Merah, where the Semantan warriors swore to hide their identity and to not reveal themselves. Seven of them were involved during the oath. Dato Bahaman changed his name to Panglima Kakap, Mat Kilau changed his name to Mat Siam. However he was almost caught by British officers and often changed his name such as Mat Dadu, Mat Dahan or Mohammed Ibrahim. Mat Lela too changed his name, into Kilat Senja or Gong Poh. Mat Kelubi changed his name to Tok Janggut.

In the year 1911, Dato' Bahaman returned to Kelantan while Mat Lela moved to Indonesia and it was rumored that Mat Lela joined the fight against Dutch occupation. The two remaining warriors died in Patani, Siam. In the year 1920, Dato' Bahaman returned to Kuantan, Pahang and lived in Kampung Paya Lalang (Padang Lalang) and changed his name as Lebai Deraman. In the year 1926, Dato' Bahaman moved to Kampung Peramu and was known as Tok Guru Peramu. Mat Kilau was said that he had often moved from place to another starting from Kampung Aur Rompin, to Tanjung Medang, Kampung Pasir Panjang, Kampung Batu Tering Pekan, Kampung Batu Lima Jalan Gambang. Mat Kelubi and Admiral Hitam's story was unknown. Dato' Bahaman lived in Kampung Peramu until his death.

== Cultural depictions ==
He was depicted by Shaharuddin Thamby in 2022 Malaysian epic Mat Kilau.
