= Tok Gajah =

19th-century Malay nobleman

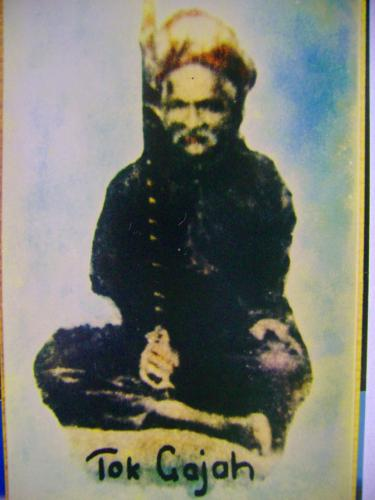

Rasu Bin Shahrom (Jawi: راسو بن شهروم ), also popularly known as Tok Gajah (Malay for 'Lord Elephant'), was a Malay nobleman of the Pahang Kingdom and its successor, the Pahang Sultanate. He was one of the loyal followers of the then Wan Ahmad, and one of the important figures in the Pahang Civil War. Due to his outstanding gallantry during the war, Rasu rose from the rank of khatib to Imam Perang (equivalent to a 'Captain general').

In 1872, Pahang joined the Klang War on the side of Tengku Kudin. Rasu and Tok Bahaman, were the two key Pahang warlords, who with their exceptional leadership emerged victorious in several important battles in Ulu Klang, Kepong, Kuala Lumpur, Kuala Selangor and Hulu Selangor. Pahang's involvement had turned the tide of war to Tengku Kudin's favor, effectively ending the war in Selangor. In recognition of his exploits in the war, Rasu received the title Orang Kaya Imam Perang Indera Gajah of Pahang, where the nickname Tok Gajah was derived, and he was further rewarded with the gift of Pulau Tawar as his personal fief.

From the establishment of a British Agency in 1887, the Pahang politics came under the purview of the British government. Increasing pressure was exerted upon the Sultan by the residing British Agent, Hugh Clifford, to administer the state according to the British ideals of just rule and modernisation. This had effectively plunged the state into a seething cauldron of discontent with clashes between traditional chiefs and the British. Tok Bahaman, the chief of Semantan, joined by other nobleman of the interior including Rasu and his son Mat Kilau, rose to arm and openly challenged the British encroachment in the state. The ensuing Pahang Uprising which was won by the British, had made Rasu and his son exiles in Terengganu, where he died in 1901.

In modern times, the name Tok Gajah is also renowned as the nickname of the state football team Sri Pahang FC, although it tends to associate more with its literal meaning, the elephant, which is a symbol of Pahang, rather than the historical figure.

== Cultural depictions ==
He was depicted by Wan Hanafi Su in 2022 Malaysian epic Mat Kilau.

== Bibliography ==
- Aruna Gopinath (1991). Pahang 1880-1933 : A Political History. The Malaysian Branch of the Royal Asiatic Society (MBRAS).
- Linehan, William (1973), History of Pahang, Malaysian Branch Of The Royal Asiatic Society, Kuala Lumpur, ISBN 978-0710-101-37-2
