= Pahang Uprising =

Late-19th century uprising in Malaysia

Date	1891 – 1895
Location	modern day Pahang, Malaysia
Result	British victory: Uprising suppressed

Belligerents
Pahang Malays	(United Kingdom) British Empire; Straits Settlements; Pahang

Commanders and leaders
Dato' Bahaman; Ahmad Muʽazzam (1891–1892); Tok Gajah; Mat Kilau other rebels chiefs	Ahmad Muʽazzam (1892–1895); John Pickersgill Rodger

The Pahang Uprising (Malay: Pemberontakan Pahang, Jawi: ڤمبرونتقن ڤهڠ), also known as the Pahang Rebellion or the Pahang War, was an uprising in Pahang, Malaysia, between 1891 and 1895. The uprising was largely led by traditional chiefs and fueled by local grievances towards the British Residential system.

By the 1880s, governance in Pahang came under the purview of the British Straits Settlements government. Increasing pressure was exerted upon the Sultan of Pahang Ahmad Mu'azzam by the residing British Agent to administer the state according to British ideals. The British ultimately compelled Sultan Ahmad to administer the sultanate as a British protectorate in 1888, and John Pickersgill Rodger was appointed as Pahang's first Resident. Tax reform introduced by the British residency resulted in serious discontent among the local chieftains who were traditionally given the right to collect taxes in their respective territories.

The uprising began when the chief of Semantan, Dato' Bahaman, retaliated against the arrest of his followers by attacking a detachment of British Sikh police, burning down a police station at Lubuk Trua, and sacking the town of Temerloh in 1891. Over the years, the rebellion grew with many other chieftains joining Dato' Bahaman, notably Tok Gajah, the chief of Pulau Tawar, and his son Mat Kilau. At the beginning of the conflict, the rebels gained significant victories but was later gradually pushed back by heavy British forces. In 1895, the war was concluded when several ringleaders were either captured or exiled in neighbouring states.

The Sultan of Pahang initially gave tacit support to the rebelling Malay chiefs but was subsequently pressured by the British to support colonial rule in Pahang. An amnesty was issued in 1892 and most of the chiefs surrendered while the rest fled (and was captured in Kelantan). Tengku Mahmud's cooperation with the British led to them rewarding him as heir to his father Sultan Ahmad.

== Background ==
=== First phase ===
The early phase of the Pahang uprising that began in 1891 was primarily confined to the area of Semantan, Temerloh. It was led by the chief of Semantan himself, Dato' Bahaman, in what was also known as the Semantan War. As disturbances spread to other districts in Pahang, more local chiefs began joining the ranks. During the period from April to June 1892, a more contentious personality, Mat Kilau, emerged. His rise coincided with the supposed plan schemed by Tok Gajah to overwhelm British strategic positions. Among others who were involved were Panglima Muda of Jempul who was to overrun Pekan, while Mat Kilau of Budu and the Jelai Chief was to annihilate Clifford's small force at Kuala Lipis.

Sultan Ahmad appears to have allowed Tok Gajah, who was in secret communication with Bahaman and the Jelai Chief, to assume direction at this period. It was said that the Sultan's royal wife, Tengku Ampuan, exerted her influence in favour of the rebels. Earlier some time between the end of 1891 and early 1892, a secret meeting was held at Sungai Selan in Jerantut, in attendance was both the Sultan and the Queen, and all the principle chiefs, where a sworn agreement was made.

On 10 April 1892, Mat Kilau with a force of 100 men armed with spears, swords and muskets, sacked the business district of Kuala Lipis. The British garrison with 30 Sikh and a small local force were unable to resist them. The looting was halted with the arrival of the Sultan's envoy, Haji Muhammad Nor who was tasked to dissuade Mat Kilau from occupying Kuala Lipis. The motive behind the Sultan's order to cancel the intended attack was unclear, some citing that the timing was inappropriate, while others suggested it was due to diplomatic reasons. Nevertheless, it was clear that the planned full-scale attack was already leaked to the British. By early May, the British position at Kuala Lipis was strengthened with reinforcements from Perak and Selangor.

After the sack of Kuala Lipis, the general uprising spearheaded by Mat Kilau reached its most dangerous point. He also carried out attacks and threatened the gold mines at Raub, in northern Pahang. On 21 May 1892, Mat Kilau's stronghold at Budu was attacked and burnt. Mat Kilau with 60 men and their women and children escaped and joined forces with Bahaman at Ulu Cheka. His activities gained momentum during the month of June 1892, when the skirmishes also reached further south at Bera.

Upon the outbreak of aggression by Mat Kilau, the British began to suspect Tok Gajah's role in directing the uprising. The Resident, J. P. Roger proposed his arrest, but this was prevented by Sultan Ahmad. The ruler promised to bring him to Pekan and then send him to Mecca. The suggestion appeared satisfactory to the British, but Sultan Ahmad's plan was to allow Tok Gajah to escape into the Kelantan-Terengganu border via Tembeling, where he was later joined by Mat Kilau. Throughout the disturbances, Sultan Ahmad resided in Pulau Tawar from June to August 1892. The Sultan was later asked by the British to reside at Pekan, a decision brought about by rumours that he was aiding the rebels with food supplies and ammunition.

=== Second phase ===
The mounting pressure imposed by the British upon the Sultan prevented him from rendering further assistance to the rebels in the second phase of the uprising, whereupon it took on a different pattern. Through the influences of religious leaders in Terengganu, a Jihad against the infidels was declared.

In an attempt to further isolate the rebels, a general amnesty was proclaimed on 16 October 1892, to be issued to all dissidents, except for Tok Gajah and Bahaman. In a report by Roger, it is estimated that the total strength of the rebels that retreated to the neighbouring Kelantan-Terengganu border, have been reduced to 60 men under Dato' Bahaman and 35 men under Mat Kilau and Tok Gajah, all fully armed with guns.

On 14 June 1894, the rebels, assisted by local reinforcements, attacked and occupied a British stockade at Kuala Tembeling. A counter-attack by the British came on 29 June 1894 when the rebels were defeated at their stockade in Jeram Ampai. The victory enabled the British to reinforce their strength for attacks on the rebels. With the fall of Jeram Ampai, it would appear that the British could have easily wiped out the rebels, but due to the large following won by the rebels among the local population, a series of attacks continued. Determined to put down the uprising from their bases, Clifford undertook an expedition to Kelantan and Terengganu on 17 July 1894, but it was met with little success initially due to the sympathy of local chiefs and the surrounding population to the rebels' cause.

As both Kelantan and Terengganu were at that time feudatory states of Siam, the British received the commitment from the Siamese foreign minister, Prince Devawongse, to prevent both states from harbouring dissidents. The prolongation of the uprising and the accompanying hardships which the natives experienced forced them to surrender and betray the dissidents. Ultimately, it was during October–November 1895 that several key ring leaders, Bahaman, Awang Nong Yusoh, Teh Ibrahim, Haji Mat Wahid, and Mat Lela were captured by the Siamese commissioner Phya Dhib Kosa and was then deported to Chiang Mai. Both Rasu and Mat Kilau were recorded dead. With their exit the rebellion came to an end, but it was only in 1913 that the dissidents who had resided in Siam was finally allowed to return to Pahang.

== See also ==
- Mat Kilau (flim)

== Bibliography ==
- Andaya, Barbara Watson; Andaya, Leonard Yuzon (1984), A History of Malaysia, London: Palgrave Macmillan, ISBN 978-0-333-27672-3
- Aruna Gopinath (1991). Pahang 1880-1933 : A Political History. The Malaysian Branch of the Royal Asiatic Society (MBRAS).
- Linehan, William (1973), History of Pahang, Malaysian Branch Of The Royal Asiatic Society, Kuala Lumpur, ISBN 978-0710-101-37-2
- Government of Pahang (1970), Laporan jawatan kuasa menyiasat munchul-nya Mat Kilau (The Report of the Investigating Committee on the reappearance of Mat Kilau), Sharikat Perchetakan Inderapura Sdn. Berhad, OCLC 829454821
- Aeby Muara (1970). Mat Kilau: satu churat churit ka-arah pengesahan-nya. Singapore : International Arts. OCLC 12002873.
- Maidin Hussein (2008), Archives Exclusive Heritage, Ministry of Unity, Culture, Arts and Heritage Malaysia, Arkib Negara Malaysia, ISBN 978-967-612-149-3
- Kalthum Jeran (1986). Hikayat Pahang. Fajar Bakti. ISBN 967-933-620-4.
