= Mat Kilau =

Folk hero from Pahang, Malaysia (1866/7–1970)

- Mat Kilau in his later years
- Born: Muhammad Kilau bin Rasu; 1866-67; Pulau Tawar, Jerantut, Pahang Kingdom
- Died: 16 August 1970; Terengganu, Malaysia (presumed); Kampung Kedondong, Jerantut, Pahang, Malaysia (official)
- Resting place: Pulau Tawar, Jerantut, Pahang, Malaysia
- Known for: Role in the Pahang uprising against the British Empire.
- Parent: Tok Gajah (father)

Muhammad Kilau bin Rasu (Jawi: محمد كيلاو بن راسو; 1866/67 – 16 August 1970) popularly known as 'Mat Kilau', or alternatively known as Mohamed bin Ibrahim or 'Mat Siam', was a local chieftain and folk hero from Pahang, Malaysia, best known for his role in the Pahang Uprising (1891–1895) against the British Empire. The outbreak of the resistance movement in Pahang in the late 18th century was mainly fueled by the grievances among the traditional ruling class towards the British Residential system.

The exceptional valor demonstrated by Mat Kilau in the uprising have gained him a place in popular memory as one of the heroes of Malay nationalism. The uprising however, was gradually suppressed by the British colonial government, with important leaders, including Mat Kilau, were forced to flee to the neighboring Terengganu and Kelantan. The British authority later on reported several conflicting accounts of his death between 1895 and 1896.

In December 1969, an old man who goes by the name 'Mat Siam', made a shocking announcement before the congregation at the mosque in Pulau Tawar, claiming to be the Mat Kilau. A committee was formed to investigate the authenticity of his identity. From the investigations conducted as well as through statements obtained from key witnesses and birth marks on his body, it was soon confirmed that he was Mat Kilau, the long-lost warrior. He died shortly afterwards.

== Early life ==
Mat Kilau was born between the year 1866/1867 in Kampung Masjid, Pulau Tawar, Jerantut District. He was the eldest son of Tok Gajah, a high ranking nobleman in Pahang court, by his third wife, Teh Mahda binti Tok Kaut from Burau, Jerantut. He was said to be excelled in Quranic recitation, berzanji and dikir maulud, as well as in the traditional dikir rebana called 'Dikir Pahang'.

Based on the description of his contemporaries, Mat Kilau was a man of moderate stature, strongly built, with light skin tone and handsome face He was said to be a master in Silat and believed to possesses magical powers. At the age of 20, he was married to a daughter of a religious teacher, Yang Chik binti Imam Daud from Kampung Kedondong. From this marriage, he had issued 4 children.

In the early years of British involvement in Pahang, the then British agent to Pahang, Hugh Clifford who visited Pulau Tawar in 1888, established friendly relations with two sons of Tok Gajah, Mat Kilau and Awang Long. It was reported that Mat Kilau was fondly referred to by Clifford as Adik Mat ('younger brother Mat'). Mat Kilau was described by Clifford as a diplomatic young man which was easier to deal with, compared to his father.

== The uprising ==
The early phase of the Pahang uprising that began in 1891 was primarily confined to the area of Semantan, Temerloh. It was led by the chief of Semantan himself, Dato' Bahaman, in what also known as the Semantan War. As the disturbances spread to other districts in Pahang, more local chiefs began joining the ranks. During the period from April to June 1892, a more contentious personality, Mat Kilau, emerged. His rise coincided with the supposedly a plan schemed by Tok Gajah to overwhelm British strategic positions. Among others who involved were Panglima Muda of Jempul who was to overrun Pekan, while Mat Kilau of Budu and the Jelai Chief to annihilate Clifford's small force at Kuala Lipis.

The general uprising spearheaded by Mat Kilau reached its most dangerous point when he and a hundred of his followers armed with swords, spears and muskets, sacked Kuala Lipis on 10 April 1892 and later threatened the gold mines at Raub. British reprisals came on 21 May 1892 when a force of Perak Sikhs under the command of Lieutenant Colonel Robert Sandilands Frowd Walker, accompanied by Hugh Clifford as political advisor, three European inspectors, two jemadars, and one hundred and five Sikhs, including thirteen gunners, attacked and burnt Mat Kilau's stronghold at Budu. Mat Kilau with sixty men and their women and children escaped and joined forces with Bahaman at Ulu Cheka. His activities gained momentum during the month of June 1892, when the skirmishes also reached further south at Bera.

Upon the outbreak of aggression by Mat Kilau, the British began to suspect Tok Gajah's role in directing the uprising. The Resident, John Pickersgill Rodger proposed his arrest, but this was prevented by Sultan Ahmad. The ruler promised to bring him to Pekan and then send him to Mecca. The suggestion appeared satisfactory to the British, but Sultan Ahmad's plan was to allow Tok Gajah to escape into Kelantan-Terengganu borders via Tembeling, where he was later joined by Mat Kilau. In an attempt to further isolate the rebels, a general amnesty was proclaimed on 16 October 1892, to be issued to all dissidents, except for Tok Gajah and Dato' Bahaman. In a report by Rodger, it is estimated that the total strength of the rebels that retreated to the neighbouring Kelantan-Terengganu, have been reduced to sixty men under the Dato' Bahaman and thirty-five men under Mat Kilau and Tok Gajah, all fully armed with guns.

On 14 June 1894, the rebels, assisted by local reinforcements, attacked and occupied a British stockade at Kuala Tembeling. A counterattack by the British came on 29 June 1894 when the rebels were defeated at their stockade in Jeram Ampai. The victory enabled the British to reinforce their strength for attacks on the rebels. With the fall of Jeram Ampai, it would appear that the British could have easily wiped out the rebels, but due to the large following won by the rebels among the local population, series of attacks continued. Determined to put down the uprising from their bases, Clifford undertook an expedition to Kelantan and Terengganu on 17 July 1894, but met with little success initially due to the sympathy of local chiefs and population to the rebels' cause.

As both Kelantan and Terengganu were at that time the feudatory states of Siam, the British received commitment from the Siamese foreign minister, Prince Devawongse, to prevent both states from harbouring the dissidents. The prolongation of the uprising and the accompanying hardships which the natives experienced forced them to surrender and betray the dissidents. Ultimately, it was during October–November 1895 that several key ring leaders, Bahaman, Awang Nong Yusoh, Teh Ibrahim, Haji Mat Wahid, and Mat Lela were captured by the Siamese commissioner Phya Dhib Kosa and deported to Chiang Mai.

== Presumed death ==
According to a report from acting Resident of Pahang, D. H. Wise, Mat Kilau was dead in 1895. The report however did not mention the location of his burial. William Linehan, in his book History of Pahang written in 1936, probably used Wise's report as his reference, mentioned that Mat Kilau and Tok Gajah died and buried in Terengganu. It remains unknown where Linehan obtained this information from, most probably it was his assumption that Mat Kilau had died fighting the British expedition while in exile in Terengganu. Although it turns out that this assumption was true for Tok Gajah who was buried in Pasir Nering, Ulu Terengganu, the exact location of Mat Kilau's burial remains unknown.

In an article by the Singapore Free Press dated 22 October 1895, Mat Kilau was reported severely wounded in a fight and was brought to Kota Bharu where he died from blood loss. Based on the investigation, the fighting was thought to have occurred at Lebir River in the hinterland of Kelantan. The report from Free Press was based on the account of the Siamese commissioner to Kelantan who personally saw the body of Mat Kilau, but the whereabout of his burial remains unknown.

== Reappearance ==
On 26 December 1969, an old man appeared before a congregation during Friday prayer in a mosque in Pulau Tawar, Jerantut, and made an announcement that he was Mat Kilau. The man was previously known to villagers as 'Mat Siam' with his full name recorded in his Malaysian identity card as Mohamad bin Ibrahim. The revelation quickly spread across the nation following extensive media coverage until it got the attention of both the state and federal governments. The then Menteri Besar of Pahang Yahya Mohd Seth instructed the formation of an investigation committee on 8 January 1970.

Based on the account of Mat Siam, it was noted that he was severely beaten in a fight with Siamese soldiers in Kelantan, in which he was presumed dead and his body was submitted to the Sultan of Kelantan for proper Islamic burials. Once he regained consciousness, the ruler had set him free and advised him to conceal his identity afterwards. The Sultan was reported to proceed with his supposed burial in Bunut Payong, replacing his body with the bark of a banana tree. The story tallied with the account of Haji Sulaiman bin Hussain, a Qadi of Kuantan, who studied at Bunut Payong, and personally heard the rumours from his teacher in 1935 about a grave which contained the bark of a banana tree.

Mat Siam had lived a nomadic life ever since, under multiple pseudonyms, namely 'Mat Dahan', 'Mat Dadu' or 'Mat Din'. Over time, he had taken up a number of jobs including rubber collector, general labour and a Silat teacher. It was not until 1926 that he began to reveal his identity as Mat Kilau to some of his close associates and relatives, including his Silat students who were made to swear a vow to keep the secret. Persuaded by relatives especially his grandson Abu Bakar bin Hassan, Mat Siam openly declared himself as Mat Kilau in December 1969.

The committee concluded their investigation and submitted the report to the Pahang State Legislative Assembly on 8 July 1970. With the consent of Sultan Abu Bakar, the Menteri Besar, Tan Sri Yahya Mohd Seth formally confirmed Mat Siam as Mat Kilau on 6 August 1970.

== Death ==
On 16 August 1970, ten days after his identity was formally confirmed by the state government, Mat Kilau died of old age at his house in Kampung Batu Lima, Jalan Gambang, Kuantan. He was honoured with a state funeral and was buried near to the grave of his late mother, Teh Mahda, at Kampung Kedondong, Jerantut, close to his native Pulau Tawar. A funeral feast was held by the state government at Pulau Tawar on the night of 23 August 1970, seventh day after his death, and attended by at least 1,200 people.

== Cultural depictions ==
He was depicted by Adi Putra in 2022 Malaysian epic Mat Kilau.

== Bibliography ==
- Andaya, Barbara Watson; Andaya, Leonard Yuzon (1984), A History of Malaysia, London: Palgrave Macmillan, ISBN 978-0-333-27672-3
- Aruna Gopinath (1991). Pahang 1880-1933 : A Political History. The Malaysian Branch of the Royal Asiatic Society (MBRAS).
- Buyong Adil (1972), Sejarah Pahang ('History of Pahang'), Dewan Bahasa dan Pustaka, OCLC 963159408
- Linehan, William (1973), History of Pahang, Malaysian Branch Of The Royal Asiatic Society, Kuala Lumpur, ISBN 978-0710-101-37-2
- Government of Pahang (1970), Laporan jawatan kuasa menyiasat munchul-nya Mat Kilau (The Report of the Investigating Committee on the reappearance of Mat Kilau), Sharikat Perchetakan Inderapura Sdn. Berhad, OCLC 829454821
- Aeby Muara (1970). Mat Kilau: satu churat churit ka-arah pengesahan-nya. Singapore : International Arts. OCLC 12002873.
- Maidin Hussein (2008), Archives Exclusive Heritage, Ministry of Unity, Culture, Arts and Heritage Malaysia, Arkib Negara Malaysia, ISBN 978-967-612-149-3
- Kalthum Jeran (1986). Hikayat Pahang. Fajar Bakti. ISBN 967-933-620-4.
