= Semantan =

Semantan may refer to:

- Semantan (Temerloh), a town in Temerloh District, Pahang, Malaysia
- Semantan MRT station, a Kajang line (KGL) Mass Rapid Transit (MRT) station at Kuala Lumpur, Malaysia
- Empire Seabank – one of Empire ships
