= Dance on television =

This is a list of television shows which feature dance as a central activity or theme.

| Show | Premiere | Country/Region | Franchise | Format | Ref. |
|---|---|---|---|---|---|
| Boogie Woogie (Indian TV series) | 1996 | India | -- | | |
| 30 Seconds to Fame | 17-07-2002 | United States | -- | Talent search/competition (variety) | |
| Aasman Se Aage | 23-04-2012 | India | -- | Drama | |
| Achas que Sabes Dançar? | 30-05-2010 | Portugal | So You Think You Can Dance | Talent search/competition (dance only) | |
| America's Ballroom Challenge | 01-02-2006 | United States | -- | Competition | |
| America's Best Dance Crew | 07-02-2008 | United States | -- | Talent search/competition (dance only) | |
| American Bandstand | 01-08-1952 | United States | -- | Musical variety | |
| The Arthur Murray Party | 20-07-1950 | United States | -- | Instructional/Game Show | |
| Bailando por um Sonho | 2006 | Brazil | Dancing with the Stars | Competition | |
| Baile | 2006 | Chile | Dancing with the Stars | Competition | |
| Ballando con le Stelle | 2005 | Italy | Dancing with the Stars | Competition | |
| Ballet Chancers | 16-11-2008 | Ireland | -- | Reality | |
| Bandwagon | 21-11-1960 | United States | -- | Musical variety | |
| Battle on the Dancefloor | 01-2016 | Netherlands | -- | Talent search/competition (dance only) | |
| BBC Young Dancer | 2015 | United Kingdom | -- | Talent search/Competition (dance only) | |
| The Buddy Deane Show | 1957 | United States | -- | Musical variety | |
| Bước nhảy hoàn vũ | 11-04-2010 | Vietnam | Dancing with the Stars | Competition | |
| Bunheads | 2012 | United States | -- | Drama | |
| The Clay Cole Show | 1959 | United States | -- | Musical variety | |
| Club MTV | 13-08-1985 | United States | -- | Musical variety | |
| Come Dancing | 29-09-1949 | United Kingdom | -- | Instructional/Competition | |
| D3 - D 4 Dance | 2016 | India | -- | Talent search/competition (dance only) | |
| Dança dos Famosos | 20-11-2005 | Brazil | Dancing with the Stars | Competition | |
| Dance Academy | 31-05-2011 | Australia | -- | Drama | |
| Dance Dance Dance | 2015 | Netherlands | Dance Dance Dance | Competition | |
| Dance Fever | 13-01-1979 | United States | -- | Competition | |
| Dance India Dance | 30-01-2009 | India | Dance India Dance | Talent search/competition (dance only) | |
| Dance India Dance Li'l Masters | 30-04-2010 | India | Dance India Dance | Talent search/competition (dance only) | |
| Dance Machine | 27-06-2008 | United States | -- | Game show | |
| Dance on Channel One | 2016 | Russia | -- | Talent search/competition (dance only) | |
| Dance on TNT | 2014 | Russia | -- | Talent search/competition (dance only) | |
| Dance on Sunset | 29-03-2008 | United States | -- | Children's show/fitness | |
| Dance Suomi | 29-08-2010 | Finland | So You Think You Can Dance | Talent search/competition (dance only) | |
| Dance Party USA | 12-05-1986 | United States | -- | Musical variety | |
| Dance Revolution | 2007 | United States | -- | Children's show/fitness | |
| The Dance Scene | 10-05-2011 | United States | -- | Reality television | |
| Dance Your Ass Off | 29-06-2009 | United States | -- | Reality television/fitness | |
| Dancing Nation | N/A | Philippines | -- | Talent search/competition (dance only) | |
| Dancing with the Stars | 18-02-2010 | Albania | Dancing with the Stars | Competition | |
| Dancing with the Stars | 01-06-2005 | United States | Dancing with the Stars | Competition | |
| Dancing with the Stars | 05-10-2004 | Australia | Dancing with the Stars | Competition | |
| Dancing with the Stars | 28-03-2010 | Greece | Dancing with the Stars | Competition | |
| Dancing with the Stars | 2005 | Netherlands | Dancing with the Stars | Competition | |
| Dancing with the Stars | 2005 | New Zealand | Dancing with the Stars | Competition | |
| Dancing Stars | 10-2005 | Austria | Dancing with the Stars | Competition | |
| Dancing on Ice | 2006 | United Kingdom | Dancing on Ice | Competition | |
| Dancing on Wheels | 2010 | United Kingdom | -- | Competition | |
| Dancin' On Air | 12-09-1981 | United States | -- | Musical variety | |
| Dancin' to the Hits | 1986 | United States | -- | Musical variety | |
| Danse avec les stars | 12-02-2011 | France | Dancing with the Stars | Competition | |
| Dans Eder misin? | 2007 | Turkey | So You Think You Can Dance | Talent search/competition (dance only) | |
| Dansefeber | 2006 | Norway | So You Think You Can Dance | Talent search/competition (dance only) | |
| Dansez pentru tine | 2006 | Romania | Dancing with the Stars | Competition | |
| Disco Step-by-Step | 01-01-1977 | United States | -- | Musical variety | |
| The Dotty Mack Show | 16-02-1953 | United States | -- | Musical variety | |
| Electric Circus | 16-08-1988 | Canada | -- | Musical variety | |
| Eurovision Dance Contest | 01-08-2007 | Trans-European | Eurovision | Talent search/competition (dance only) | |
| Eurovision Young Dancers Competition | 16-06-1985 | Trans-European | Eurovision | Talent search/competition (dance only) | |
| Everybody Dance Now | 2012 | Australia | Everybody Dance Now | Talent search/competition (dance only) | |
| Fame | 28-05-2003 | United States | -- | Talent search/competition (variety) | |
| Future Shock | 1976 | United States | -- | Musical variety | |
| The Greatest Dancer | 05-01-2019 | United Kingdom | -- | Talent search/competition (dance only) | |
| Glee | 19-05-2009 | United States | -- | Drama | |
| Got to Dance | 20-12-2009 | United Kingdom | Got to Dance | Talent search/competition (dance only) | |
| Got to Dance: Tylko Taniec | 02-03-2012 | Poland | Got to Dance | Talent search/competition (dance only) | |
| The Grind | 29-06-1992 | United States | -- | Musical variety | |
| The Groovy Show | 1967 | United States | -- | Musical variety | |
| Hollywood A Go-Go | 1956 | United States | -- | Musical variety | |
| It's Showtime | 24-09-2009 | Philippines | -- | Variety/game show | |
| Jhalak Dikhhla Jaa Reloaded | 30-08-2015 | India | Dancing with the Stars | Competition | |
| Just Dance | 18-06-2011 | India | -- | Talent search/competition (dance only) | |
| Kan Du Danse? | 20-07-2006 | Denmark | So You Think You Can Dance | Talent search/competition (dance only) | |
| Let's Dance | 1957 | Australia | -- | Instructional | |
| Let's Dance | 21-05-2006 | Germany | Dancing with the Stars | Competition | |
| Let's Dance | 2006 | Slovakia | Dancing with the Stars | Competition | |
| Let's Dance | 2006 | Sweden | Dancing with the Stars | Competition | |
| Let's Rhumba | 1946 | United States | -- | Instructional | |
| Live to Dance | 04-01-2011 | United States | Got to Dance | Talent search/competition (dance only) | |
| The Milt Grant Show | 1956 | United States | -- | Musical variety | |
| Nach Baliye | 25-08-2006 | India | -- | Talent search/competition (dance only) | |
| Nolad Lirkod | 02-12-2005 | Israel | So You Think You Can Dance | Talent search/competition (dance only) | |
| Pants-Off Dance-Off | 18-04-2006 | United States | -- | Musical variety | |
| Parir te Karogh Es | 2011 | Armenia | So You Think You Can Dance | Talent search/competition (dance only) | |
| Party Machine | 07-01-1991 | United States | -- | Musical variety | |
| Pineapple Dance Studios | 14-02-2010 | United Kingdom | -- | Reality television | |
| Ples sa zvijezdama | 02-12-2006 | Croatia | Dancing with the Stars | Competition | |
| Pop It! | 03-09-2007 | Canada | -- | Children's show/fitness | |
| Princess Tutu | 16-08-2002 | Japan | -- | Anime | |
| Quien Baila Mejor? | 14-06-2008 | Spain | -- | Talent search/competition (dance only) | |
| ¡Quiero Bailar! | 2010 | Spain | -- | Talent search/competition (dance only) | |
| Rokdim Im Kokhavim | 2005 | Israel | Dancing with the Stars | Competition | |
| Se Ela Dança, Eu Danço | 05-01-2011 | Brazil | -- | Talent search/competition (dance only) | |
| Shall We Dance? | 14-08-2005 | Philippines | -- | Competition | |
| Shimmy (TV series) | 2008 | Canada | -- | Instructional | |
| Shivaree | 1965 | United States | -- | Musical variety | |
| Showtime at the Apollo | 12-08-1987 | United States | -- | Musical variety | |
| Skal vi danse? | 15-01-2006 | Norway | Dancing with the Stars | Competition | |
| Solid Gold | 13-08-1980 | United States | -- | Musical variety | |
| So You Think You Can Dance | 08-09-2008 | Belgium/Netherlands | So You Think You Can Dance | Talent search/competition (dance only) | |
| So You Think You Can Dance | 16-02-2013 | China | So You Think You Can Dance | Talent search/competition (dance only) | |
| So You Think You Can Dance | 01-02-2007 | Greece | So You Think You Can Dance | Talent search/competition (dance only) | |
| So You Think You Can Dance | 2016 | India | So You Think You Can Dance | Talent search/competition (dance only) | |
| So You Think You Can Dance | 05-04-2007 | Malaysia | So You Think You Can Dance | Talent search/competition (dance only) | |
| So You Think You Can Dance | 2006 | New Zealand | So You Think You Can Dance | Talent search/competition (dance only) | |
| So You Think You Can Dance | 07-02-2009 | South Africa | So You Think You Can Dance | Talent search/competition (dance only) | |
| So You Think You Can Dance | 02-01-2010 | United Kingdom | So You Think You Can Dance | Talent search/competition (dance only) | |
| So You Think You Can Dance | 20-07-2005 | United States | So You Think You Can Dance | Talent search/competition (dance only) | |
| So You Think You Can Dance Arabia | 2014 | Lebanon/Egypt | So You Think You Can Dance | Talent search/competition (dance only) | |
| So You Think You Can Dance Australia | 08-02-2008 | Australia | So You Think You Can Dance | Talent search/competition (dance only) | |
| So You Think You Can Dance Canada | 11-09-2008 | Canada | So You Think You Can Dance | Talent search/competition (dance only) | |
| So You Think You Can Dance Scandinavia | 28-02-2008 | Scandinavia | So You Think You Can Dance | Talent search/competition (dance only) | |
| So You Think You Can Dance: The Next Generation | 13-04-2013 | Netherlands | So You Think You Can Dance | Talent search/competition (dance only) | |
| So You Think You Can Dance: The Next Generation | 30-05-2016 | United States | So You Think You Can Dance | Talent search/competition (dance only) | |
| Soul Train | 02-09-1971 | United States | -- | Musical variety | |
| Star Search | 05-20-1983 | United States | -- | Talent search/competition (variety) | |
| Step It Up and Dance | 03-04-2008 | United States | -- | Reality television | |
| Sterren op de Dansvloer | 2006 | Belgium | Dancing with the Stars | Competition | |
| Street Party | 1989 | United States | -- | Music video | |
| Strictly Come Dancing | forthcoming | Netherlands | Dancing with the Stars | Competition | |
| Strictly Come Dancing | 04-02-2006 | South Africa | Dancing with the Stars | Competition | |
| Strictly Come Dancing | 14-05-2004 | United Kingdom | Dancing with the Stars | Competition | |
| Strictly Dance Fever | 23-03-2005 | United Kingdom | -- | Talent search/competition (dance only) | |
| Strictly Dancing | 13-02-2004 | Australia | -- | Talent search/competition (dance only) | |
| Superstars of Dance | 04-01-2009 | United States | -- | Competition | |
| Swingin' Time | 1965 | Canada | -- | Musical variety | |
| Szombat esti láz | 2005 | Hungary | Dancing with the Stars | Competition | |
| Tancyuyut Vsi! | 12-09-2008 | Ukraine | So You Think You Can Dance | Talent search/competition (dance only) | |
| Taniec z gwiazdami | 2005 | Poland | Dancing with the Stars | Competition | |
| Tanssii tähtien kanssa | 05-03-2006 | Finland | Dancing with the Stars | Competition | |
| Tantsi z Zirkamy | 2006 | Ukraine | Dancing with the Stars | Competition | |
| Tantsud tähtedega | 08-10-2006 | Estonia | Dancing with the Stars | Competition | |
| Tsekvaven Varsklavebi | 2012 | Georgia | Dancing with the Stars | Competition | |
| This Week's Music | 1984 | United States | -- | Musical variety | |
| Through the Crystal Ball | 1949 | United States | | First half-hour, all-dance show on American television | |
| Thử thách cùng bước nhảy | 15-09-2012 | Vietnam | So You Think You Can Dance | Talent search/competition (dance only) | |
| Tu gali šokti | 11-04-2010 | Lithuania | So You Think You Can Dance | Talent search/competition (dance only) | |
| U Can Dance | 11-06-2006 | Philippines | | Competition; not a SYTYCD show | |
| Upbeat | 1964 | United States | -- | Musical variety | |
| The Ultimate Dance Battle | 27-03-2011 | Netherlands | -- | Talent search/competition (dance only) | |
| Vild med dans | 2005 | Denmark | Dancing with the Stars | Competition | |
| VIP Dance | 08-09-2009 | Bulgaria | Dancing with the Stars | Competition | |
| Welcome to the Ballroom | 08-07-2017 | Japan | -- | Anime | |
| The White Heather Club | 07-05-1958 | United Kingdom | | | |
| Bailando por Un Sueño | 07-05-2020 | Mexico | -- | Musical variety | |
| You Can Dance | 16-02-2012 | France | So You Think You Can Dance | Talent search/competition (dance only) | |
| You Can Dance | 2010 | Germany | So You Think You Can Dance | Talent search/competition (dance only) | |
| You Can Dance: Po prostu tańcz! | 10-09-2007 | Poland | So You Think You Can Dance | Talent search/competition (dance only) | |
| Zara Nachke Dikha | 14-06-2010 | India | -- | Talent search/competition (dance only) | |
| Dance Plus | 26-07-2015 | India | -- | Talent search/competition (dance only) | |
