= So You Think You Can Dance (American TV series) =

American reality television dance competition show

- Created by: Simon Fuller; Nigel Lythgoe
- Developed by: Simon Fuller
- Directed by: Matthew Diamond; Bruce Gowers; Nigel Lythgoe
- Presented by: Lauren Sánchez; Cat Deeley
- Judges: Nigel Lythgoe; Mary Murphy; Adam Shankman; Mia Michaels; Paula Abdul; Jason Derulo; Maddie Ziegler; Vanessa Hudgens; Stephen "tWitch" Boss; Laurieann Gibson; Dominic "D-Trix" Sandoval; JoJo Siwa; Matthew Morrison; Leah Remini; Maksim Chmerkovskiy; Allison Holker
- Country of origin: United States
- Original language: English
- No. of seasons: 18
- No. of episodes: 319

Production
- Executive producers: Barry Adelman; Simon Fuller; Nigel Lythgoe; Allen Shapiro
- Production companies: 19 Entertainment; Dick Clark Productions (2005–19, 2024); MRC Live & Alternative (2022)

Original release
- Network: Fox
- Release: July 20, 2005 – May 20, 2024

So You Think You Can Dance (SYTYCD) is an American reality television dance competition show that airs on Fox in the United States and is the flagship series of the international So You Think You Can Dance television franchise. It was created by American Idol producers Simon Fuller and Nigel Lythgoe and is produced by 19 Entertainment and Dick Clark Productions. The series premiered on July 20, 2005, with over ten million viewers and ended the summer season as the top-rated show on television. The first season was hosted by American news personality Lauren Sánchez. Since the second season, it has been hosted by English former children's television personality and game show host Cat Deeley.

The show features a format where dancers trained in a variety of dance genres enter open auditions held in several major U.S. cities to showcase their talents and move forward through successive additional rounds of auditions to test their ability to adapt to different styles. At the end of this process, a small number of contestants are chosen. These contestants move on to the competition's main phase, where they perform solo, duet, and group dance numbers on live television, attempting to master a diverse selection of dance styles, including classical, contemporary, ballroom, hip-hop, street, club, jazz and musical theatre styles, among others. They compete for the votes of the broadcast viewing audience which, combined with the input of a panel of judges, determines which dancers advance to the next stage from week to week, until a winner is crowned as "America's favorite dancer".

So You Think You Can Dance has won seven Primetime Emmy Awards for Outstanding Choreography and a total of nine Primetime Emmy Awards altogether. Licensed variations of the show, produced for broadcast markets in other nations, began airing in August 2005 and dozens of localized adaptations of the show have been produced since, airing in 41 countries to date. The sixteenth season premiered June 3, 2019. On February 20, 2020, the show was renewed for a seventeenth season, that was set to air in summer 2020, but due to the COVID-19 pandemic in the United States, the season was indefinitely postponed on June 18, 2020, and eventually premiered on May 18, 2022. In December 2023, it was revealed that an eighteenth season would start filming in Atlanta from December 4, 2023, to January 29, 2024. The eighteenth season would premiere on March 4, 2024. Lythgoe departed from the show in January 2024, following a sex abuse lawsuit from one of the show's judges Paula Abdul. JoJo Siwa would join the judging panel to replace Lythgoe. In May 2026, the series was canceled after eighteen seasons.

== Show format ==
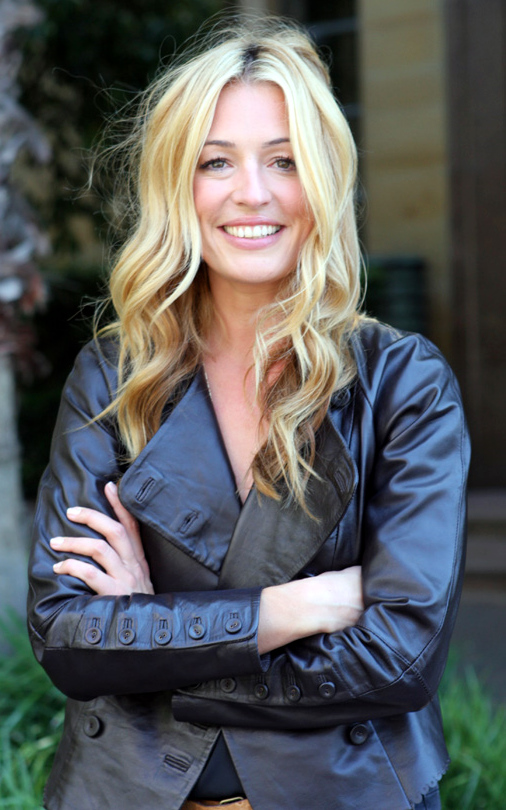
Television presenter Cat Deeley has served as the host of So You Think You Can Dance since its second season, presenting every episode since 2006.

A typical season of So You Think You Can Dance is divided between a selection process, during which expert judges select contestants from a wide pool of applicant dancers, and a competition phase, during which these "contestants" (more typically referred to as the "Top 20") compete for votes from home viewers. Although it is produced over months, the selection phase is highly edited and usually constitutes only the first 2 to 4 weeks of aired episodes with the competition episodes forming the remaining 7 to 9 weeks of the season.

=== Open auditions ===
The open auditions, the first stage in determining a season's contestants, take place in 2 to 6 major U.S. cities each season and are typically open to anyone aged 18 to 30 at the time of their audition, although season 13 focused on a younger class of contestants, ages 8 to 13. The cities where auditions are held change from season to season but some, such as Los Angeles and New York City, have featured in most seasons. During this stage, the contestants perform a brief routine (typically a solo, but duet and group routines are allowed as well) before a panel of dance experts usually headed by series creator and executive producer Nigel Lythgoe. This panel then decides on the spot whether the dancer demonstrated enough ability and performance value to proceed further. If the contestant exhibited exceptional ability in their performance, judges award "a ticket to Vegas" (or in more recent seasons "a ticket to the Academy"), moving them instantly one step forward in the competition. Alternatively, if judges are on the fence about the contestant, they may ask the contestant to wait until the end of that day's auditions to participate in a short test of their ability to use professional choreography.

=== Callbacks ===
The second stage of the selection process is referred to as "the callbacks" (this round was referenced as "Vegas Week" for much of the show's run, as it was held in Las Vegas, but was called "Academy Week" from season 13 to season 16, later called the "Choreography Round" in season 17). The callbacks consist of a several-day-long process in which the remaining hopefuls are tested for overall well-rounded dance ability, stamina, creativity, and ability to perform under pressure. The contestants are put through a battery of rounds that test their ability to use various dance styles; these are typically some of the more well-represented genres that are later prominent in the competition phase, such as hip-hop, jazz, ballroom, and contemporary. Additionally, the contestants may be asked to perform further solos in styles of their choosing and participate in a group choreography round in which small teams of contestants must display their musicality and ability to communicate professionally by choreographing a performance to a randomly selected piece of music. This challenge is notable as being the only time contestants are asked to choreograph themselves, aside from solos.

The callbacks are often collectively portrayed as one of the most exhausting and stressful stages of the competition; each successive round sees cuts in which a significant portion of the remaining contestants are eliminated from the competition and are given a limited amount of time to adapt to styles they are sometimes wholly unfamiliar with while being physically taxed by the rapid progression of rounds and a limited amount of rest. At the end of this process, usually less than 40 contestants remain in a pool the top contestants are chosen. Most seasons have featured 20 "top" contestants for the competition portion of the show, but season 1 was represented by a Top 16, season 7 saw a Top 11, seasons 13 through 16 and 18 have featured a Top 10, and season 17 saw a Top 12.

=== Contestant stage ===
Following the contestant selection process, the show transitions into its regular competition phase, which lasts for the rest of the season. The competition stage is typically divided into eight weeks, generally with two contestants eliminated per week. Contestants are paired up into female-male couples that will sometimes stay paired for much of the remaining competition if neither is eliminated (since season 7, contestants have also been occasionally paired with "All Stars", returning contestants from previous seasons who pair up with the contestants, but who are not themselves competing). These couples perform 1 or 2 duets per week in different styles which are typically, but not always, randomly selected. These duets, as with all non-solo performances at this stage in the competition, are choreographed by professional choreographers. Before most duet performances, a video packet of clips of the couple preparing to perform the routine is shown. These packets are intended not only to demonstrate the couple's efforts to master the routine, but also to give glimpses of the personalities and personal histories of the contestants, as well as insights from the choreographer as to the thematic, narrative, and artistic intentions of the piece. Following each duet performance, the week's panel of judges gives critical feedback, often emphasizing the two key areas of technique and performance value. Duets and their accompanying video packets and critiques typically take up the majority of an episode but are often supplemented by solos, group numbers, and occasionally guest dance or musical performances.

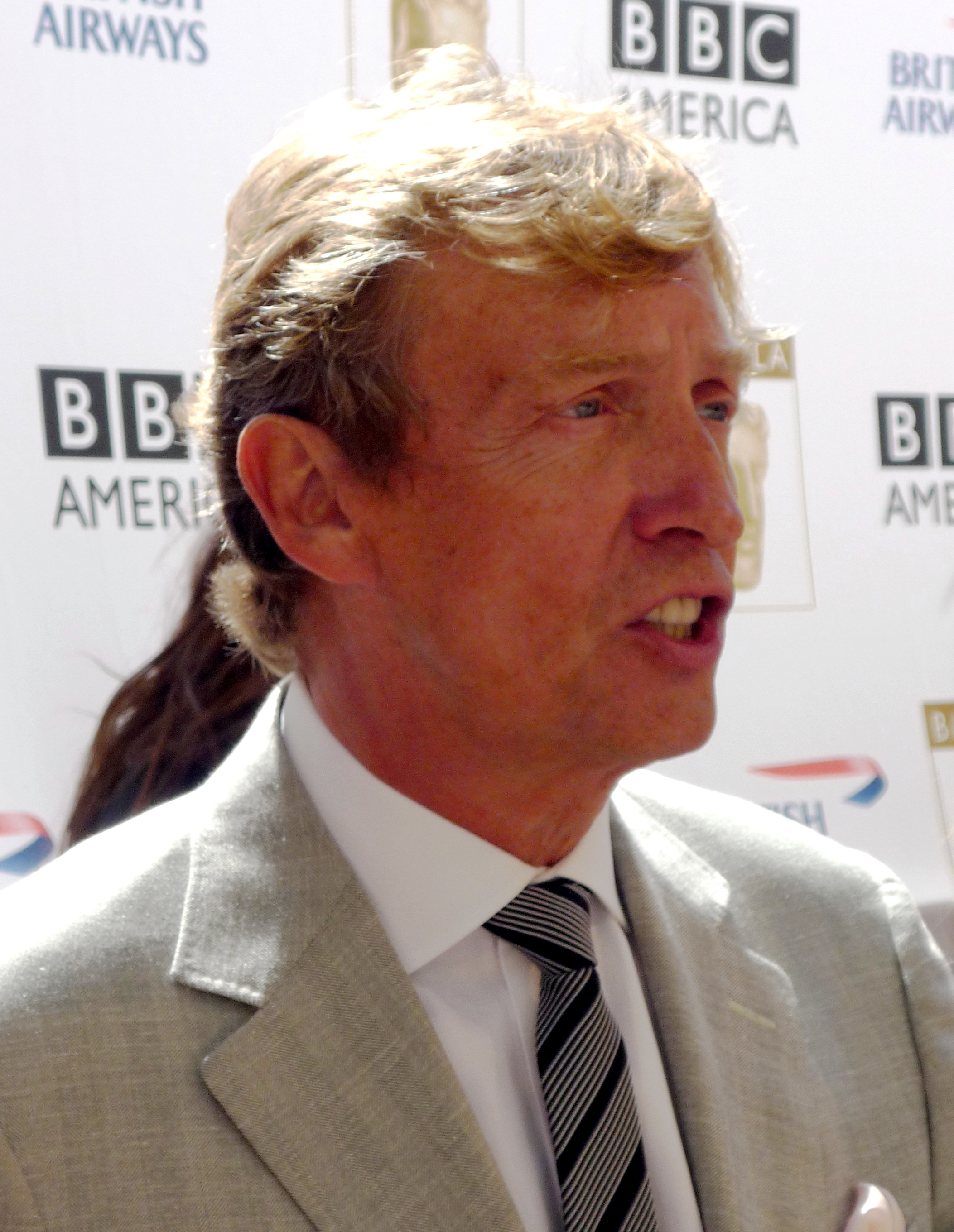
Nigel Lythgoe is co-creator of the So You Think You Can Dance franchise and has been executive producer of the American and British productions for their entire runs. He also served as a permanent judge for the first sixteen seasons of the American production as well as the entire run of the British production.

In season 1, each week of the competition featured a single episode, with contestants' eliminations pre-recorded the week they occurred and then broadcast at the beginning of the next week's episode. In seasons 2 to 8, the show's weekly format was split between two episodes, a performance episode, as described above, and a results show which revealed the outcome of the at-home-viewer voting following the performance show of the same week. More recent seasons have returned to a one-show-per-week format, but with each week's episode typically reflecting the results of voting for the previous week's performances, with these results revealed at the end of the following week's performances. Depending on the stage of the competition, each week may feature eliminations that are based entirely on an at-home viewer vote, or the vote may simply create a group of bottom contestants from which the show's judges will select the final eliminations. Voting has also varied by season (and often within seasons) regarding whether the voter selected individuals or couples. Following the announcement of their elimination, contestants are typically given a brief send-off video packet. Each competitive episode ends with a quick recap of the night's routines accompanied by voting prompts. Episodes typically last around two hours, commercials included. There has also been variability in how long couples are kept together and how the at-home-viewer votes are balanced against judge decisions, though ultimately at some point in every season, the judges stop using their power to save contestants, and eliminations are determined exclusively by viewer votes. The total number of hours shown in a given week during the performance phase of the competition has varied from two to four hours.

The finale episode is often the most elaborately produced show of a season and features the last performances of the contestants, encore performances of many of the season's most acclaimed routines, guest dancers (including returning contestants from previous seasons and cast members from other international versions of the franchise), musical performances, and multiple video packets chronicling the course of the season's events, all culminating in the announcement of the winner of the competition. Most seasons have featured a single winner, while seasons 9 and 10 featured both female and male winners. Following the closure of the season, the Top Ten contestants often go on tour for several months, performing hit routines from the season among other performances.

=== Judges ===
A typical season of So You Think You Can Dance is presided over by a panel of 2 to 4 permanent judges, supplemented by occasional guest judges, with the panel sometimes expanding to twice or more its normal size for callback episodes or season finales. Executive producer and co-creator of the show Nigel Lythgoe was the only judge to have sat as a permanent member of the panel across the first 16 seasons, although ballroom specialist Mary Murphy has also sat as a permanent member of the panel for the majority of seasons; Lythgoe was set to return as a judge on the show's eighteenth season, but left the show in January 2024. Other permanent judges have included film director and choreographer Adam Shankman, contemporary choreographer Mia Michaels, pop music and dance icon Paula Abdul, dancer and actress Maddie Ziegler, actress and singer Vanessa Hudgens, music and dance artist Jason Derulo, choreographer and television personality Laurieann Gibson, actress, dancer and singer JoJo Siwa, actor and singer Matthew Morrison and successful show alumni Stephen "tWitch" Boss and Dominic "D-Trix" Sandoval.

Many earlier seasons frequently featured guest judges in occasional episodes, although this practice has become increasingly rare. These guest judge positions have typically been filled by choreographers who regularly work on the show (who in rare cases may also be former contestants themselves) as well as by iconic names from the entertainment industry. Guest judges for the show have included: Debbie Allen, Christina Applegate, Robin Antin, Toni Basil, Cicely Bradley, Kristin Chenoweth, Misty Copeland, Alex Da Silva, Ellen DeGeneres, Tyce Diorio, Joey Dowling, Napoleon and Tabitha D'umo, Carmen Electra, Brian Friedman, Jean-Marc Généreux, Jason Gilkison, Neil Patrick Harris, Hi-Hat, Katie Holmes, Dan Karaty, Lady Gaga, Carly Rae Jepsen, Lil' C, Rob Marshall, Mandy Moore, Megan Mullally, Kenny Ortega, Toni Redpath, Debbie Reynolds, Wade Robson, Doriana Sanchez, Shane Sparks, Sonya Tayeh, Olisa Thompson, Stacey Tookey, Jesse Tyler Ferguson and Travis Wall.

=== Overview of format and presentation by season ===
Season	Dates	Host	Permanent judges	Separate results show?	Contestant showcase episode? (Note: From its inception in season 6 and through season 10, the dancer showcase episode represented a non-competitive round with no viewer voting or subsequent eliminations, followed the next week by the first competitive round. In season 11, it was the first episode of the season upon which viewers voted.)	Number of contestants in first live show	Number of contestants eliminated per week	Number of contestants remaining in finale	Number of winners	All-Stars included in format?	Point at which judge eliminations end	Voting for individual contestants starting with
1	Summer 2005 (July–October)	Lauren Sánchez	Nigel Lythgoe	No	No	16	2	4	1	No	Top 8	Top 8
2	Summer 2006 (May–August)	Cat Deeley	Nigel Lythgoe	Yes	No	20	2	4	1	No	Top 10	Top 10
3	Summer 2007 (May–August)	Cat Deeley	Nigel Lythgoe; Mary Murphy	Yes	No	20	2	4	1	No	Top 10	Top 10
4	Summer 2008 (May–August)	Cat Deeley	Nigel Lythgoe; Mary Murphy	Yes	No	20	2	4	1	No	Top 10	Top 10
5	Summer 2009 (May–August)	Cat Deeley	Nigel Lythgoe; Mary Murphy	Yes	No	20	2	4	1	No	Top 10	Top 10
6	Fall 2009 (September–December)	Cat Deeley	Nigel Lythgoe; Mary Murphy; Adam Shankman	Yes	Yes	20	2	6	1	No	Top 10	Top 10
7	Summer 2010 (May–August)	Cat Deeley	Nigel Lythgoe; Adam Shankman; Mia Michaels	Yes	Yes	11	1 (Note: In seasons 7 and 8, the judges decided not to eliminate any dancers on the occasion of one results show; in both cases, this event was followed by the elimination of double the normal number of contestants the following week. Similarly, for format reasons, season 9 featured two shows with double eliminations, with four dancers eliminated instead of two for each of these shows.)	3	1	Yes	Top 4	Top 11
8	Summer 2011 (May–August)	Cat Deeley	Nigel Lythgoe; Mary Murphy	Yes	Yes (Note: For seasons 8 to 10, the dancer showcase episode was combined with the Top 20 reveal episode, with groups of dancers performing immediately after being revealed as finalists.)	20	2	4	1	Yes	Top 6	Top 10
9	Summer 2012 (May–September)	Cat Deeley	Nigel Lythgoe; Mary Murphy	No	Yes	20	2	4	2	Yes	Top 6	Top 20
10	Summer 2013 (May–September)	Cat Deeley	Nigel Lythgoe; Mary Murphy	No	Yes	20	2	4	2	Yes	Top 6	Top 20
11	Summer 2014 (May–September)	Cat Deeley	Nigel Lythgoe; Mary Murphy	No	Yes	20	2	4	1	Yes	Top 10	Top 20
12	Summer 2015 (June–September)	Cat Deeley	Nigel Lythgoe; Paula Abdul; Jason Derulo	No	Yes	20	2 (Note: Unlike all previous seasons, season 12 featured the elimination of one "street" dancer and one "stage" dancer each week, as opposed to one female and one male contestant (as in all previous seasons which eliminated two dancers per week).)	4	1	Yes	Top 14	Top 20
13 (Note: Season 13 (during which the show was subtitled 'The Next Generation') featured competitors between the ages of 9 (or as young as 8 at the time of application) and 14.)	Summer 2016 (May–September)	Cat Deeley	Nigel Lythgoe; Paula Abdul; Jason Derulo; Maddie Ziegler	No	Yes	10	1 (Note: In season 13, the judges held the audition rounds, but the all-stars, rather than the judges, made the eliminations during Academy week to choose the top 10. After this, in episodes 7 and 8, from the two contestants with the lowest viewer votes, the judges made the elimination. In episode 9, the two contestants with the lowest viewer votes were both eliminated and in episodes 10 and 11, the contestant with the lowest viewer votes was eliminated.)	4	1	Yes	Top 8	Top 10
14	Summer 2017 (June–September)	Cat Deeley	Nigel Lythgoe; Mary Murphy; Vanessa Hudgens	No	No	10	1	4	1	Yes	Top 6	Top 10
15	Summer 2018 (June–September)	Cat Deeley	Nigel Lythgoe; Mary Murphy; Vanessa Hudgens; Stephen "tWitch" Boss	No	No	10	2	4	1	Yes	Top 8	Top 10
16	Summer 2019 (June–September)	Cat Deeley	Nigel Lythgoe; Mary Murphy; Laurieann Gibson; Dominic "D-Trix" Sandoval	No	No	10	2	4	1	Yes	Top 8	Top 10
17	Summer 2022 (May–August)	Cat Deeley	Stephen "tWitch" Boss; JoJo Siwa; Matthew Morrison; Leah Remini	No	No	12	2 (Note: In episode 9 of season 17, none of the contestants were eliminated. Three were eliminated in episode 10, while one was eliminated in episode 11.)	2	1	Yes	Top 6	Top 12 (Note: In season 17, votes are submitted not by the at-home viewing audience through telephone or online voting, but rather solely by the in-studio live audience of each performance episode.)
18	Spring 2024 (March–May)	Cat Deeley	Allison Holker; JoJo Siwa; Maksim Chmerkovskiy	No	No	10	2	3	1	No	Top 3	Top 10

== Dance styles and choreographers ==
Throughout its eighteen seasons, So You Think You Can Dance has featured dozens of distinct dance styles in its choreographed routines. Most of these styles fall into four categories that are regularly showcased and can be found in almost every performance episode: western contemporary/classical styles, ballroom styles, hip-hop/street styles as well as Jazz and its related styles. Various other forms of dance that do not especially fall into these broad categories are seen as well, but not as regularly. The following styles have all been seen in a choreographed duet or group routine; styles featured only in auditions or solos are not listed.

=== Classical styles ===
Routines from the classically derived style of contemporary dance are the most common dances seen on the show, being seen in every performance episode of the series (and typically at least twice per episode). While contemporary, lyrical, and modern dance are typically considered three separate (if overlapping) styles of dance, the practice on So You Think You Can Dance has been to refer to all routines in this area as "contemporary", except in the first season where the label "lyrical" was used for the same purpose. Ballet routines occur much more rarely, at a rate of one or two per season, since their introduction in the fourth season.

Genre	Styles
Western Classical styles
Western Classical styles	Contemporary, Lyrical, Modern, Ballet/Pas de Deux
Choreographers
Dee Caspary, Tessandra Chavez, Sean Cheesman, Thordal Christensen, Tyce Diorio, Joey Dowling, Talia Favia, Justin Giles, Mandy Moore, Mia Michaels, Lindsay Nelko, Dwight Rhoden, Desmond Richardson, Jaci Royal, Garry Stewart, Sonya Tayeh, Stacey Tookey, Travis Wall, Tovaris Wilson, Keith Young

=== Street and club styles ===
Hip-hop routines are also present in every performance episode. While these routines frequently feature elements from many different subgenres of hip-hop (locking and popping, for example) and various "street" styles (such as breaking), they are typically all labeled under the umbrella term of hip-hop. An exception is the now frequently featured lyrical hip-hop, which is unique amongst all styles on SYTYCD in that it is the only one that is held to have become a known distinct style at least in part as a result of the show; the style is widely attributed to regular show choreographers Tabitha and Napoleon D'umo and the term itself to judge Adam Shankman. These two broad categories are occasionally supplemented by routines that are labeled as krump, breakdancing, waacking, and stepping.

Genre	Styles
Street and Contemporary Club Styles
Street and Contemporary Club Styles	Hip-hop (umbrella term for all Popping, Locking, and New Style/Commercial Hip-Hop styles), Lyrical Hip-hop, Breaking, Krump, Stepping, Waacking, Vogue
Choreographers
Cicely Bradley, Luther Brown, Tessandra Chavez, Tabitha and Napoleon D'umo, Dan Karaty, Marty Kudelka, Lil' C, Keone and Mari Madrid, Chuck Maldonado, Todd Sams, Christopher Scott, Dave Scott, Shane Sparks, Jamal Sims, Olisa Thompson, Dana Wilson, Pharside and Phoenix, Luam, Mark Kanemura

=== Ballroom styles ===
Ballroom styles are also seen regularly in every performance episode. These routines may use the movement of traditional International Standard forms or lean toward American competitive styles. Other routines may use street or regional variants or may combine elements of different variations.

Genre	Styles
Standard or Smooth Ballroom styles
Standard or Smooth Ballroom styles	Foxtrot, Tango, Quickstep, Waltz (including Smooth Waltz, Slow Waltz, American Slow Waltz, and Viennese Waltz variants)
Latin/Rhythm Ballroom styles
Latin/Rhythm Ballroom styles	Argentine Tango, Bolero, Cha-Cha-Cha, Jive, American Jive, Mambo, Paso Doble, Rumba, Salsa, Street Salsa, Samba, African Samba
Choreographers
Mark Ballas, Leonardo Barrionuevo, Sharna Burgess, Dmitry Chaplin, Valentin Chmerkovskiy, Alex Da Silva, Sasha Farber, Anya Garnis, Jean-Marc Généreux, Jason Gilkison, Hunter Johnson, Jenna Johnson, Pasha Kovalev, Melanie LaPatin, Miriam Larici, Liz Lira, Michael Mead, Tony Meredith, Tomas Mielnicki, Ron Montez, France Mousseau, Mary Murphy, Jonathan Platero, Oksana Platero, Toni Redpath, Jonathan Roberts, Elena Samodanova, Fabian Sanchez, Edward Simon, Emma Slater, Heather Smith, J.T. Thomas, Louis Van Amstel, Gustavo Vargas, Glenn Weiss

=== Jazz, Broadway, and musical theater styles ===
Jazz is featured in nearly all performance episodes. While these routines are typically labeled simply "Jazz", the genre is notable as being one of the most fusional featured on the show and various style combinations and sub-categories have been referenced. Descended from Jazz but treated as a separate genre on SYTYCD, "Broadway" is analogous to the label "musical theater" outside the U.S.

Genre	Styles
Jazz Styles
Jazz Styles	Jazz, Contemporary Jazz, Modern Jazz, Lyrical Jazz, African Jazz, Jazz-Funk, Latin Jazz, Pop-Jazz/Pop
Broadway/musical theatre styles
Broadway/musical theatre styles	Broadway, Burlesque, Can-Can, Tap
Choreographers
Chloe Arnold, Al Blackstone, Andy Blankenbuehler, Warren Carlyle, Sean Cheesman, Tyce Diorio, Joey Dowling, Brian Friedman, Laurie Ann Gibson, Savion Glover, Derick K. Grant, Mark Kanemura, Charles Klapow, Ray Leeper, Spencer Liff, Mandy Moore, Anthony Morigerato, Amanda Robson, Wade Robson, Sonya Tayeh, Travis Wall, Nick Young

=== American social styles ===
These dance styles are featured less frequently than their ballroom relatives but have been seen intermittently since the first season.

Genre	Styles
American Social / Traditional Club Styles
American Social / Traditional Club Styles	Charleston, Country-Western Two-Step, Disco, Go-Go, Hustle, Lindy Hop, Rock n' Roll, Swing, West Coast Swing
Choreographers
Ronnie DeBenedetta, Carla Heiney, Brandi Tobais, Travis Payne, Doriana Sanchez, Benji Schwimmer, Kristen Sorci, Maria Torres, Nick Williams

=== Regional/traditional styles ===
In addition to the broad categories above, many more styles that are less common in the U.S. are sometimes featured. Most of these are seen only once, but the Bollywood style has been featured several times per season since the fourth season.

Genre	Styles
Regional/Traditional Styles
Regional/Traditional Styles	Bollywood, African, Capoeira, Flamenco, Irish, Kalinka, Malevos, Tahitian, Tropak
Choreographers
Lilia Babenko, Leonardo Barrionuevo, Nakul Dev Mahajan, Miriam Larici, Tiana Liufau, Youri Nelzine.

== Grand finalists ==
Season	Winner	Runner-up	Third place	Fourth place		
1	Nick Lazzarini (Contemporary Jazz)	Melody Lacayanga (Contemporary)	Jamile McGee (Popping)	Ashlé Dawson (Jazz)		
2	Benji Schwimmer (Swing/Latin)	Travis Wall (Contemporary)	Donyelle Jones (Jazz/Hip-Hop)	Heidi Groskreutz (Ballroom)		
3	Sabra Johnson (Contemporary)	Danny Tidwell (Contemporary)	Neil Haskell (Contemporary)	Lacey Schwimmer (Swing/Latin)		
4	Joshua Allen (Hip-Hop)	Stephen "tWitch" Boss (Hip-Hop)	Katee Shean (Contemporary)	Courtney Galiano (Contemporary)		
5	Jeanine Mason (Contemporary)	Brandon Bryant (Contemporary)	Evan Kasprzak (Broadway)	Kayla Radomski (Contemporary)		
	Winner	Runner-up	Third place	Fourth place	Fifth place	Sixth place
6	Russell Ferguson (Krump)	Jakob Karr (Contemporary)	Kathryn McCormick (Contemporary)	Ellenore Scott (Jazz)	Ashleigh Di Lello (Ballroom)	Ryan Di Lello (Ballroom)
	Winner	Runner-up				
7	Lauren Froderman (Contemporary)	Kent Boyd (Contemporary Jazz)				
	Winner	Runner-up	Third place	Fourth place		
8	Melanie Moore (Contemporary)	Sasha Mallory (African Jazz)	Marko Germar (Contemporary Jazz)	Tadd Gadduang (Breakdance)		
	Female winner	Male winner	Female runner-up	Male runner-up		
9	Eliana Girard (Ballet)	Chehon Wespi-Tschopp (Ballet)	Tiffany Maher (Jazz)	Cyrus "Glitch" Spencer (Popping/Animation)		
10	Amy Yakima (Jazz)	Du-Shaunt "Fik-Shun" Stegall (Hip-Hop)	Jasmine Harper (Contemporary)	Aaron Turner (Tap)		
	Winner	Runner-up	Third place	Fourth place		
11	Ricky Ubeda (Contemporary)	Valerie Rockey (Tap)	Jessica Richens (Jazz)	Zack Everhart (Tap)		
	Winner	Runner-up				
12	Gaby Diaz (Tap)	Jaja Vaňková (Animation/Krump)				
	Winner	Runner-up	Third place	Fourth place		
13	Leon "Kida" Burns (Hip-Hop)	J.T. Church (Jazz)	Tate McRae (Contemporary/Ballet)	Emma Hellenkamp (Tap)		
14	Lex Ishimoto (Contemporary Hip-Hop)	Koine Iwasaki (Contemporary)	Taylor Sieve (Contemporary)	Kiki Nyemchek (Latin Ballroom)		
15	Hannahlei Cabanilla (Contemporary)	Jensen Arnold (Latin ballroom)	Genessy Castillo (Contemporary)	Slavik Pustovoytov (Hip Hop/Animation)		
16	Bailey Muñoz (Breaking)	Mariah Russell (Contemporary)	Gino Cosculluela (Contemporary)	Sophie Pittman (Contemporary)		
	Winner	Runner-up				
17	Alexis Warr (Latin Ballroom)	Keaton Kermode (Contemporary)				
	Winner	Runner-up	Third place			
18	Anthony Curley (Contemporary)	Dakayla Wilson (Jazz)	Madison Rouge Alvarado (Jazz Funk)			

== Special shows ==
On September 2, 2009, as a prelude to season 6, a special show aired featuring judge's favorites for the top 15 routines from the first five seasons. At the end of the show, show creator and judge Nigel Lythgoe presented his favorite performance, a contemporary piece choreographed by Tyce Diorio and performed by Melissa Sandvig and Ade Obayomi.

In March 2014, Chinese television station CCTV broadcast a promotional episode in which notable all-star dancers from the U.S. and Chinese versions of So You Think You Can Dance competed directly against one another as teams. Titled Zhōngměi Wǔ Lín Guànjūn Duìkàngsài - Super Dancer Born Tonight, the show was shot in Las Vegas but never aired on U.S. television.

== Ratings ==
So You Think You Can Dance premiered with over 10 million viewers in 2005. For season 1, it was the number 1 summer show on television. However, when NBC's America's Got Talent premiered in the summer of 2006, it took the title of "#1 summer show" and, over the following few years, broadened its lead. In the summer of 2009, SYTYCD premiered strong with a 3.4 rating in its target demographic, although with the start of America's Got Talent roughly a month later in the same timeslot, Dance fell to number 4 on the ratings board. It continued to lose viewers throughout the summer of 2009 and ended up with an average of approximately 8 million viewers. Fox then moved SYTYCD to its fall 2009 schedule where its ratings continued to decline; hitting an all-time series low of 4.6 million viewers for a "special" episode hosted by Nigel Lythgoe on September 2, 2009. The move to the fall was short-lived. After declining to an average of 6 million viewers, Fox moved SYTYCD back to the summer of 2010. With Mia Michaels replacing Mary Murphy and former contestants termed as "All-Stars" being used as partners, the ratings for Dance continued to slide to all-time series lows; with just 5.6 million viewers watching on July 15, 2010. For season 7, So You Think You Can Dance averaged just over 5 million viewers. After season 7, Mia Michaels was replaced on the judge's panel by returning personality Mary Murphy. The change appeared to have little effect on the ratings, and the show continued to average just over five million viewers per episode in 2011's season 8. Season 9 saw a slight rise in ratings early on, with each of the season's first five episodes watched between six and seven million viewers, but the rise was short-lived and the show's ratings hit a new low of 4.16 million viewers on August 29, 2012. Season 10 maintained similar numbers, averaging about 4 million viewers per episode in 2013, with a 4.3 million viewership for the last episode of the season, an all-time series low for a finale.

In April 2014, Lythgoe appealed to fans on Twitter to share information about the show ahead of the 11th season's May premiere in an attempt to augment the show's ratings for the season and bolster its chances of renewal thereafter. The show was renewed for a twelfth season, but ratings continued to decline, with an average of around 3.5 million viewers per show. Fox renewed the show for a thirteenth season but with a drastically reworked format focused on child dancers. Ratings declined further for the new version, with only five episodes breaking the 3 million viewer mark; the finale saw a series-low viewership of just 2.27 million viewers.

In 2016, a New York Times study of the 50 TV shows with the most Facebook Likes found that "in general", Dance "is more popular in cities, though it hits peak popularity in Utah".

Season	Timeslot (ET)	First aired		Last aired		TV season
Season	Timeslot (ET)	Date	Viewers (in millions)	Date	Viewers (in millions)	TV season
1	Wednesday 8:00 pm	July 20, 2005	10.30	October 5, 2005	8.20	2005
2	Wednesday 8:00 pm Thursday 9:00 pm	May 25, 2006	10.70	August 16, 2006	10.70	2006
3	Wednesday 8:00 pm Thursday 9:00 pm	May 24, 2007	9.50	August 16, 2007	9.60	2007
4	Wednesday 8:00 pm Thursday 9:00 pm	May 22, 2008	6.70	August 7, 2008	9.70	2008
5	Wednesday 8:00 pm Thursday 9:00 pm	May 21, 2009	8.80	August 6, 2009	9.60	2009
6	Tuesday 8:00 pm Wednesday 8:00 pm	September 9, 2009	6.60	December 16, 2009	7.10	2009-10
7	Wednesday 8:00 pm Thursday 9:00 pm	May 27, 2010	8.20	August 12, 2010	6.70	2010
8	Wednesday 8:00 pm Thursday 8:00 pm	May 26, 2011	9.50	August 11, 2011	6.10	2011
9	Wednesday 8:00 pm	May 24, 2012	6.26	September 18, 2012	4.71	2012
10	Tuesday 8:00 pm	May 14, 2013	5.12	September 10, 2013	4.37	2013
11	Wednesday 8:00 pm	May 28, 2014	5.33	September 3, 2014	4.12	2014
12	Monday 8:00 pm	June 1, 2015	4.03	September 14, 2015	2.44	2015
13	Monday 8:00 pm	May 30, 2016	3.75	September 12, 2016	2.27	2016
14	Monday 8:00 pm	June 12, 2017	3.56	September 25, 2017	1.91	2017
15	Monday 8:00 pm	June 6, 2018	3.25	September 10, 2018	2.60	2018
16	Monday 9:00 pm	June 3, 2019	2.70	September 16, 2019	1.93	2019
17	Wednesday 9:00 pm	May 18, 2022	2.07	August 10, 2022	1.46	2022
18	Monday 9:00 pm	March 4, 2024	1.04	May 20, 2024	0.80	2024

== Influence and international franchise ==
Dance competition had been a part of American television for decades before the premiere of So You Think You Can Dance, but usually in the form of all-around talent searches (such as Star Search, Soul Train, or Showtime at the Apollo). However, a season-long American Idol-like talent-search show with a sole focus on dance had never been broadcast on American network television. Producers and judges associated with the show have stated on numerous occasions, both within broadcasts of the show and in interviews, that the series was meant to rejuvenate the visibility and appreciation of dance as an art form in the U.S. and to give exposure to struggling dancers, and stated that the show would help inspire other dancers to prefill their dreams. Several dance-themed competition shows have been produced for American television since the premiere of So You Think You Can Dance, including America's Best Dance Crew, Superstars of Dance, Live to Dance, and World of Dance.

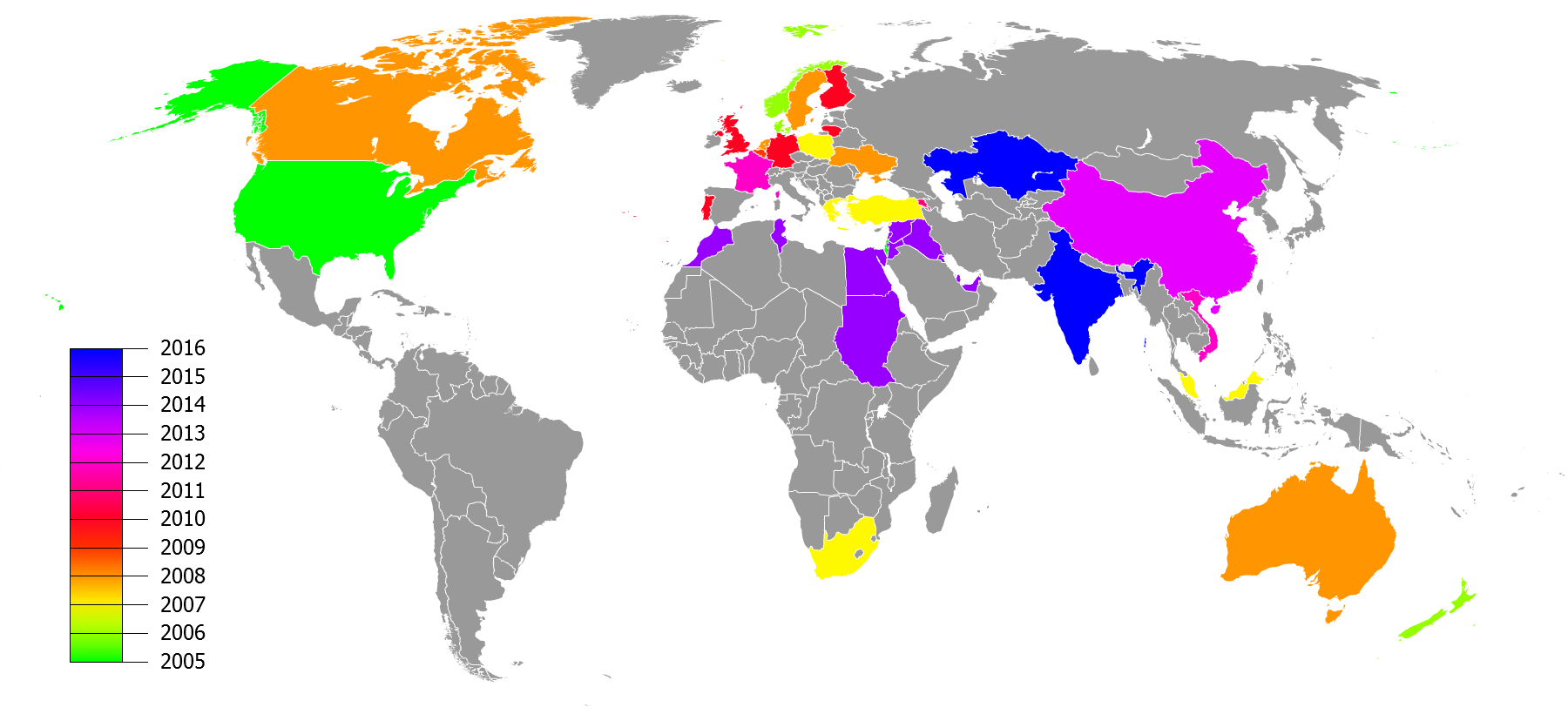
Since the premiere of the American version in Summer 2005, localized adaptations of So You Think You Can Dance have been produced for 39 other countries.

In 2009, Lythgoe came together with fellow SYTYCD judge Adam Shankman as well as Katie Holmes, Carrie Ann Inaba, and others in the dance entertainment industry to launch The Dizzyfeet Foundation, intending to provide scholarships and training to young dancers of limited means. The foundation has been referenced sporadically on the show since. In 2010, Lythgoe, with the assistance of other SYTYCD personalities and long-time healthy lifestyles proponent congresswoman Eleanor Holmes Norton, was successful in getting another of his dance-oriented concepts realized an official National Dance Day, now held annually on the last Saturday of July, to promote fitness through movement. This national dance day has been celebrated annually by the show since.

Before the end of 2005, when the series first premiered, its format had already been licensed for the first of several foreign adaptations. To date, the resulting So You Think You Can Dance franchise has produced 28 shows representing 39 countries and comprising more than 90 individual seasons. These adaptations have aired in Armenia, Australia, Belgium, Canada, China, Denmark, Egypt, Finland, France, Georgia, Germany, Greece, Iraq, India, Israel, Jordan, Kazakhstan, Kuwait, Lebanon, Lithuania, Malaysia, Morocco, the Netherlands, New Zealand, Norway, Palestinian Territories, Poland, Portugal, Qatar, Russia, South Africa, Sudan, Sweden, Syria, Tunisia, Turkey, Ukraine, United Arab Emirates, the United Kingdom and Vietnam.

== Awards and nominations ==
As of 2017, nine former SYTYCD contestants have been nominated for the Primetime Emmy Award for Outstanding Choreography. Five were nominated for their work on Dancing with the Stars: Chelsie Hightower in 2010, Travis Wall and Nick Lazzarini in 2012 (with Teddy Forance), Allison Holker in 2013 (with Derek Hough) and Witney Carson in 2015. Hokuto Konishi, Ryan "Ryanimay" Conferido, and Dominic "D-Trix" Sandoval were nominated in 2016 as part of the B-boy troupe Quest Crew for their work on America's Best Dance Crew. Dmitry Chaplin in 2009 and Travis Wall in 2011, 2013, 2014, 2015, 2016, and 2017, were nominated for their work on SYTYCD itself. The only former contestants to have won the Choreography Emmy are Konishi, Conferido, and Sandoval in 2016 and Wall in 2015 and 2017.

=== Emmy Awards ===
Emmy Awards and nominations
Year	Result	Category	Recipient(s)/ Choreographer(s)	Style	Music
2007	Won (Note: Wade Robson and Mia Michaels were joint-winners along with Rob Marshall and John Deluca from Tony Bennett: An American Classic.)	Outstanding Choreography	Wade Robson	Pop-Jazz	"Ramalama (Bang Bang)"—Róisín Murphy
2007	Won	Outstanding Choreography	Mia Michaels	Contemporary	"Calling You"—Celine Dion
2008	Won	Outstanding Choreography	Wade Robson	Jazz	Hummingbird and Flower/"The Chairman's Waltz" from Memoirs of a Geisha
2008	Nominated	Outstanding Choreography	Mandy Moore	Jazz	Table/"Sweet Dreams (Are Made of This)"—Eurythmics
2008	Nominated	Outstanding Choreography	Shane Sparks	Hip-hop	Transformers/"Fuego"—Pitbull
2008	Nominated	Outstanding Makeup For A Multi-Camera Series Or Special (Non-Prosthetic)			
2009	Won	Outstanding Choreography	Tyce Diorio	Contemporary	Adam and Eve/"Silence" from Unfaithful
2009	Nominated	Outstanding Choreography	Tabitha and Napoleon D'umo	Hip-hop	"Bleeding Love"—Leona Lewis
2009	Nominated	Outstanding Choreography	Mia Michaels	Contemporary	"Mercy"—Duffy
2009	Nominated	Outstanding Choreography	Dmitry Chaplin	Argentine tango	"A Los Amigos" from Forever Tango
2009	Nominated	Outstanding Makeup For A Multi-Camera Series Or Special (Non-Prosthetic)			
2009	Won	Outstanding Costumes For A Variety/Music Program Or A Special	Soyon An		
2010	Won	Outstanding Choreography	Mia Michaels	Contemporary	"Koop Island Blues"—Koop feat Ane Brun
2010	Won	Outstanding Choreography	Mia Michaels	Contemporary	Addiction/"Gravity"—Sara Bareilles
2010	Won	Outstanding Choreography	Mia Michaels	Contemporary	"One" from A Chorus Line
2010	Nominated	Outstanding Choreography	Stacey Tookey	Contemporary	Fear/"Two Steps Away"—Patti LaBelle
2010	Nominated	Outstanding Makeup For A Multi-Camera Series Or Special (Non-Prosthetic)			
2010	Won	Outstanding Costumes For A Variety/Music Program Or A Special	Soyon An; Graine O'Sullivan		
2011	Won	Outstanding Choreography	Tabitha and Napoleon D'umo	Hip-Hop	"Scars"—Basement Jaxx ft. Kelis, Meleka, and Chipmunk
2011	Won	Outstanding Choreography	Tabitha and Napoleon D'umo	Lyrical Hip-Hop	"Fallin'"—Alicia Keys
2011	Won	Outstanding Choreography	Tabitha and Napoleon D'umo	Hip-Hop	"Outta Your Mind" (District 78 Mix)—Lil Jon and LMFAO
2011	Won	Outstanding Choreography	Mia Michaels	Contemporary	Alice in Mia-Land/"Every Little Thing She Does Is Magic"—Sting
2011	Won	Outstanding Choreography	Mia Michaels	Contemporary	"When We Dance"—Sting
2011	Won	Outstanding Choreography	Mia Michaels	Contemporary	"This Bitter Earth/On the Nature of Twilight"—Max Richter and Dinah Washington
2011	Nominated	Outstanding Choreography	Mandy Moore	Pop-Jazz	"Oh Yeah"—Yello
2011	Nominated	Outstanding Choreography	Mandy Moore	Jazz	"Boogie Shoes"—KC & the Sunshine Band
2011	Nominated	Outstanding Choreography	Mandy Moore	Contemporary	"I Surrender"—Celine Dion
2011	Nominated	Outstanding Choreography	Stacey Tookey	Contemporary	"Mad World" (Alternate Version)—Michael Andrews ft. Gary Jules
2011	Nominated	Outstanding Choreography	Stacey Tookey	Contemporary	"Sundrenched World" (Live Session)—Joshua Radin
2011	Nominated	Outstanding Choreography	Stacey Tookey	Contemporary	"Heaven is a Place on Earth"—Katie Thompson
2011	Nominated	Outstanding Choreography	Travis Wall	Contemporary	"Collide" (Acoustic Version)—Howie Day
2011	Nominated	Outstanding Choreography	Travis Wall	Contemporary	"How It Ends"—DeVotchKa
2011	Nominated	Outstanding Choreography	Travis Wall	Contemporary	"Fix You"—Coldplay
2011	Nominated	Outstanding Host for a Reality or Reality-Competition Program	Cat Deeley		
2011	Won	Outstanding Lighting Design/Lighting Direction for a Variety, Music, or Comedy Series	Robert Barnhart; Pete Radice; Patrick Boozer; Matt Firestone		
2011	Nominated	Outstanding Reality-Competition Program	Producers		
2012	Nominated	Outstanding Choreography	Stacey Tookey	Contemporary	"In This Shirt"—The Irrepressibles
2012	Nominated	Outstanding Choreography	Stacey Tookey	Contemporary	"Turning Tables"—Adele
2012	Nominated	Outstanding Choreography	Stacey Tookey	Contemporary	"Heart Asks Pleasure First"—Ahn Trio
2012	Nominated	Outstanding Choreography	Christopher Scott	Hip-hop	"Misty Blue"—Dorothy Moore
2012	Nominated	Outstanding Choreography	Christopher Scott	Hip-hop/Contemporary	"Velocity"—Nathan Lanier
2012	Nominated	Outstanding Choreography	Spencer Liff	Broadway	"Whatever Lola Wants"—Ella Fitzgerald
2012	Nominated	Outstanding Choreography	Spencer Liff	Broadway	"Please Mr. Jailer"—Rachel Sweet
2012	Nominated	Outstanding Choreography	Spencer Liff	Broadway	"(Where Do I Begin) Love Story (Away Team Remix)"—Shirley Bassey
2012	Nominated	Outstanding Host for a Reality or Reality-Competition Program	Cat Deeley		
2012	Won	Outstanding Lighting Design/Lighting Direction for a Variety Series	Robert Barnhart; Matt Firestone; Pete Radice; Patrick Boozer		
2012	Nominated	Outstanding Reality-Competition Program	Producers		
2013	Nominated	Outstanding Choreography	Sonya Tayeh	Contemporary	"Possibly Maybe"—Björk
2013	Nominated	Outstanding Choreography	Sonya Tayeh	Contemporary	"Turning Page"—Sleeping At Last
2013	Nominated	Outstanding Choreography	Sonya Tayeh	Jazz	"Sail"—Awolnation
2013	Nominated	Outstanding Choreography	Mandy Moore	Contemporary	"The Power of Love"—Celine Dion
2013	Nominated	Outstanding Choreography	Mandy Moore	Contemporary	"Wild Horses"—Charlotte Martin
2013	Nominated	Outstanding Choreography	Tabitha and Napoleon D'umo	Jazz/Hip-hop	"The Circle of Life/Nants Ingonyama (District 78 Remix) from The Lion King"—Ella Fitzgerald
2013	Nominated	Outstanding Choreography	Tabitha and Napoleon D'umo	Jazz	"The Lovecats"—The Cure
2013	Nominated	Outstanding Choreography	Tabitha and Napoleon D'umo	Jazz	The Beautiful People (District 78 remix)"—Marilyn Manson
2013	Nominated	Outstanding Choreography	Travis Wall	Contemporary	"Where the Light Gets In"—Sennen
2013	Nominated	Outstanding Choreography	Travis Wall	Contemporary	"Without You"—Harry Nilsson
2013	Nominated	Outstanding Choreography	Travis Wall	Contemporary	"Unchained Melody"—The Righteous Brothers
2013	Nominated	Outstanding Host for a Reality or Reality-Competition Program	Cat Deeley		
2013	Nominated	Outstanding Lighting Design/Lighting Direction for a Variety Series	Robert Barnhart; Matt Firestone; Pete Radice; Patrick Boozer		
2013	Nominated	Outstanding Reality-Competition Program	Producers		
2014	Nominated	Outstanding Choreography	Christopher Scott	Hip-hop	"Trigger (Original Mix)"—Kezwik ft. Mel Presson
2014	Nominated	Outstanding Choreography	Christopher Scott	Jazz	"Sand"—Nathan Lanier ft. Karen Whipple
2014	Nominated	Outstanding Choreography	Christopher Scott	Contemporary	"The Gravel Road" from The Village (Score from the Motion Picture)
2014	Nominated	Outstanding Choreography	Mandy Moore	Contemporary	"I Can't Make You Love Me"—Mark Masri
2014	Nominated	Outstanding Choreography	Mandy Moore	Jazz	"Feeling Good"—Jennifer Hudson
2014	Nominated	Outstanding Choreography	Mandy Moore	Contemporary	"Edge of Glory (Live from a Very Gaga Thanksgiving)"—Lady Gaga
2014	Won	Outstanding Choreography	Tabitha and Napoleon D'umo	Hip-hop	"Gold Rush"—Clinton Sparks ft. 2 Chainz, Macklemore, & D.A.
2014	Won	Outstanding Choreography	Tabitha and Napoleon D'umo	Hip-Hop	"Run the World (Girls) (Nappytabs Remix)"—Beyoncé
2014	Won	Outstanding Choreography	Tabitha and Napoleon D'umo	Hip-Hop	"Puttin' On the Ritz"—Herb Alpert ft. Lani Hall
2014	Nominated	Outstanding Choreography	Travis Wall	Contemporary	"Hangin' By a Thread"—Jann Arden
2014	Nominated	Outstanding Choreography	Travis Wall	Contemporary	"Medicine"—Daughter
2014	Nominated	Outstanding Choreography	Travis Wall	Contemporary	"Wicked Game (Live at Kilkenny Arts Festival, Ireland 2011)"—James Vincent McMorrow
2014	Nominated	Outstanding Host for a Reality or Reality-Competition Program	Cat Deeley		
2014	Nominated	Outstanding Makeup For A Multi-Camera Series Or Special (Non-Prosthetic)			
2014	Nominated	Outstanding Reality-Competition Program	Producers		
2015	Won	Outstanding Choreography	Travis Wall	Contemporary	"Wave"—Beck
2015	Won	Outstanding Choreography	Travis Wall	Contemporary	"When I Go"—Over the Rhine
2015	Won	Outstanding Choreography	Travis Wall	Contemporary	"Wind Beneath My Wings"—RyanDan
2015	Nominated	Outstanding Choreography	Sonya Tayeh	Contemporary	"Vow"—Meredith Monk
2015	Nominated	Outstanding Choreography	Sonya Tayeh	Contemporary	"So Broken (Live)"—Björk
2015	Nominated	Outstanding Choreography	Sonya Tayeh	Contemporary	"Europe, After The Rain" —Max Richter
2015	Nominated	Outstanding Choreography	Spencer Liff	Broadway	"Hernando's Hideaway"—Ella Fitzgerald
2015	Nominated	Outstanding Choreography	Spencer Liff	Broadway	"I've Got the World on a String"—Frank Sinatra
2015	Nominated	Outstanding Choreography	Spencer Liff	Broadway	"Maybe This Time"—Liza Minnelli
2015	Nominated	Outstanding Host for a Reality or Reality-Competition Program	Cat Deeley		
2015	Nominated	Outstanding Lighting Design/Lighting Direction for a Variety Series	Robert Barnhart, Matt Firestone, Patrick Boozer, Pete Radice		
2015	Nominated	Outstanding Hairstyling for a Multi-Camera Series Or Special	Sallie Nicole, Sean Smith, Dean Banowetz, Ralph Abalos, Shawn Finch, Melissa Jaqua		
2015	Nominated	Outstanding Makeup for a Multi-Camera Series or Special	Heather Cummings, Marie DelPrete, Amy Harmon, Tyson Fountaine, Adam Christopher		
2015	Nominated	Outstanding Reality Competition Program	Producers		
2016	Nominated	Outstanding Choreography	Travis Wall	Contemporary	"Beautiful Friends"—Helen Money
2016	Nominated	Outstanding Choreography	Travis Wall	Contemporary	"November"—Max Richter
2016	Nominated	Outstanding Choreography	Travis Wall	Contemporary	"Gimme All Your Love"—Alabama Shakes
2016	Nominated	Outstanding Choreography	Anthony Morigerato	Tap	"Dibidy Dop (Swing Mix)"—Club des Belugas feat. Brenda Boykin
2016	Nominated	Outstanding Lighting Design/Lighting Direction for a Variety Series	Robert Barnhart, Matt Firestone, Patrick Boozer, Pete Radice		
2017	Won	Outstanding Choreography	Travis Wall	Contemporary	"The Mirror"—Alexandre Desplat
2017	Won	Outstanding Choreography	Travis Wall	Contemporary	"Send in the Clowns"—Sarah Vaughan and the Count Basie Orchestra
2017	Won	Outstanding Choreography	Travis Wall	Contemporary	"She Used to be Mine"—Sara Bareilles
2017	Nominated	Outstanding Choreography	Mandy Moore	Contemporary	"Unsteady (Erich Lee Gravity Remix)"—X Ambassadors
2017	Nominated	Outstanding Choreography	Mandy Moore	Contemporary	"This is Not the End"—Clare Maguire
2017	Nominated	Outstanding Lighting Design/Lighting Direction for a Variety Series	Robert Barnhart, Matt Firestone, Patrick Boozer, Pete Radice		

=== Teen Choice Awards ===
Year	Result	Category
2006	Won	Choice TV: Breakout Show
2006	Won	Choice Summer Series
2007	Nominated	Choice Summer TV Show
2008	Nominated	Choice Summer TV Show
2008	Nominated	Choice TV: Reality Dance
2010	Nominated	Choice Personality: Cat Deeley
2010	Nominated	Choice Summer TV Show
2018	Won	Choice Summer TV Show

== See also ==
- So You Think You Can Dance franchise index and overview
- List of So You Think You Can Dance finalists
- Dance on television (list of shows)

Similar dance competition TV shows:

- America's Best Dance Crew
- Live to Dance/Got to Dance
- Superstars of Dance
- World of Dance
