= You Can Dance (disambiguation) =

You Can Dance is a 1987 remix album by Madonna.

You Can Dance may also refer to:

- ABBA: You Can Dance, a video game for the Wii
- So You Think You Can Dance, a franchise of reality television shows
  - You Can Dance (French TV series), a French version of the franchise
  - You Can Dance (German TV series), a German version of the franchise
  - You Can Dance: Po prostu tańcz!, a Polish version of the franchise
- "You Can Dance", a 1997 song by Mr. President from the album Night Club
- "You Can Dance", a 2010 song by Future Boy from the album Volume 1
- "You Can Dance", a 2010 song by Bryan Ferry from the album Olympia
- "You Can Dance", a 2013 song by Client from the album Authority
