= So You Think You Can Dance =

TV show franchise

- Generic series logo
- Created by: Simon Fuller; Nigel Lythgoe
- Original work: So You Think You Can Dance (American TV series)
- Owner: 19 Entertainment
- Years: 2005–present

Films and television
- Television series: So You Think You Can Dance (independent international versions, see below)

Miscellaneous
- Genre: Reality television
- First aired: 20 July 2005; 21 years ago

So You Think You Can Dance is a franchise of reality television shows in which contestants compete in dance. The first series of the franchise, created by Idols producers Simon Fuller and Nigel Lythgoe, premiered in July 2005 and has broadcast seventeen seasons since. Adaptations of the show began airing in other countries in late 2005 and to date 30 localized adaptations have been produced, representing 41 countries and comprising more than ninety individual seasons.

== Format ==
Although each varies in the particulars of its format and presentation, all shows in the So You Think You Can Dance franchise share a premise of placing dancers-—who come from a wide variety of dance backgrounds and are often amateur or semi-professional in experience—-in a competition which requires them to adapt to multiple styles of dance. As the competition progresses, a combination of judge decisions and at-home-viewer votes determine which dancers will advance in the competition from week to week, until ultimately one dancer is voted champion of that particular season and receives a prize package that may consist of money, work or training opportunities, additional material prizes, and typically the title of the respective country's "Favorite Dancer" (e.g. "America's Favorite Dancer").

A show in the franchise is typically composed of three phases of competition: initial open auditions, callbacks/finalist selection, and finals/live performance shows. A given series or season may air only one show per week or two, but rarely more. The initial open auditions are typically held at various locations throughout the relevant country and are open to dancers of varied backgrounds and experience levels, though generally there is an age cap (with the age limits being non-consistent between entries in the franchise). Although usually unseen in the final aired edit of the show, some productions may also hold producer auditions, in which the initial talent pool is screened, before the televised auditions. The open auditions are overseen by a panel of judges, typically experts in dance or the entertainment field, who will select a portion of auditioning dancers to advance in the competition. The following stage, sometimes called the "callbacks", "boot camp", or "academy" will further reduce this remaining pool of dancers down to the season's "finalists", usually by putting the dancers through a series of short dance workshops and routines while the judges evaluate their capabilities, adaptability, and overall potential for the competition. The callback phase ends when the judge's panel selects a number of season finalists (typically between ten and twenty total dancers, half women and half men).

Collectively the auditions and callbacks, being edited down considerably, represent only a minority of episodes and are televised during the first few weeks of a season. Following these episodes are the finals (referred to in some entries as "performance shows" or "live shows"), in which the remaining contestants are matched into couples and are assigned new dance styles—-typically, but not always, assigned by a luck-of-the-draw system—each week. These episodes combine stage performances (including solos, duets, and group routines), short "behind-the-scenes" video packets of the dancers working with their choreographers and each other to master the routines, and judge evaluations of the performances to form the bulk of their run-time, occasionally supplemented by guest performances. These episodes are also the point at which at-home-viewers begin their involvement in the show: their votes (combined with judge decisions) will decide which dancers remain in the competition as eliminations reduce the number of contestants weekly until a finale episode in which the winner is revealed. While most of the above are elements shared by all shows in the franchise, entries vary considerably in the details: the number of finalists, the number of shows per week, the manner in which judge decisions are weighted against home-viewer votes, the styles of dance assigned, presentation style, production values, and even the number of winners are all examples of elements of the format that have fluctuated throughout the run of the franchise.

== Dance styles ==
The following is a non-exhaustive list of dance styles which have been featured on shows within the So You Think You Can Dance franchise, with notes on nomenclature between versions. Only styles featured in choreographed duet or group routines during the competition phase of the show are listed here; styles featured only in solos or auditions are not listed.

Genre	Styles
Western classical styles	Contemporary, lyrical, modern, ballet/pas de deux
Street and contemporary club styles	Hip-hop, lyrical hip-hop, animation breaking/b-boying, contemporary hip-hop, dubstep, electric boogaloo, krump, house, locking, popping, stepping, voguing, waacking
Classical/standard/smooth ballroom styles	Foxtrot/slowfox, tango, Argentine tango, quickstep, waltz, Viennese waltz, slow waltz, English waltz
Latin/rhythm ballroom styles	Cha-cha/cha-cha-cha, jive, American jive, lambada, mambo, pasodoble, rumba, African rumba, Cuban rumba, salsa, street salsa, samba, African samba
Jazz styles	Jazz, contemporary jazz, modern jazz, lyrical jazz, Afro-/African jazz, commercial, jazz-funk, Latin jazz, pop/pop-jazz, Afro-pop, street jazz
Broadway/musical theatre styles	Broadway (musical theatre), burlesque, can-can, tap dancing
American social/traditional club styles	Boogaloo, charleston, disco, new disco, go-go, hustle, lindy hop, rock n' roll, swing, west coast swing
Regional/traditional styles	Bollywood, dancehall (sometimes alternatively labeled reggae, reggaeton, or reggae-jam), African, Afro-Cuban, bellydance, cabera, capoeira, kalinka, maculelê, malevos, sevillanas, Tahitian, tropak
Eastern classical styles	Malaysian classical/contemporary, Chinese classical/contemporary, Indian classical/contemporary

== Franchise index ==
Country/Region	Show title	Language	Host	Network	Premiere	Seasons	Status
Algeria	So You Think You Can Dance El Djazair	Arabic	Anis Hamidi	D1 TV			Ongoing
Arab League	So You Think You Can Dance - Yalla Nerkos!	Arabic	Rita Hayek	MTV; Annahar; Fox Movies ME	28-09-2014	1	Discontinued
Armenia	Parir te Karogh Es	Armenian	Grikor Aghakhanyan	Shant TV	2011	1; 2; 3	Discontinued
Australia	So You Think You Can Dance Australia	English	Natalie Bassingthwaighte (Seasons 1–3); Carrie Bickmore (Season 4)	Network Ten	08-02-2008; 09-02-2014	1; 2; 3; 4	Discontinued
(Netherlands) (Belgium) (Luxembourg); Benelux	So You Think You Can Dance	Dutch; English	EliZe (Season 1); An Lemmens & Dennis Weening (Season 2-7); Wendy van Dijk (Season 8-)	RTL5 (Season 1-7) Net5 (Season 8); VTM	08-09-2008; 01-09-2009	1; 2; 3; 4; 5; 6; 7	Ongoing
(Netherlands) (Belgium) (Luxembourg); Benelux	So You Think You Can Dance: The Next Generation (Dutch TV series)	Dutch; English	Lieke van Lexmond & Dennis Weening	RTL5	13-04-2013	1	Discontinued
Canada	So You Think You Can Dance Canada	English; French	Leah Miller	CTV	11-09-2008	1; 2; 3; 4	Discontinued
China	So You Think You Can Dance: Wǔ Lín Zhēngbà (Season 1); So You Think You Can Dance: Zhōngguó Hǎo Wǔdǎo (Season 2)	Chinese	Cheng Lei (Season 1); Hua Shao (Season 2)	Dragon TV (Season 1); Zhejiang STV (Season 2)	16-02-2013	1; 2	Discontinued
Denmark	Kan Du Danse?	Danish	Thomas Mygind & Anne Katrine Skole	TV3	20-07-2006	1; 2	Discontinued
Finland	Dance Suomi	Finnish	Caro Axel Smith	Nelonen	29-08-2010	1; 2	Discontinued
France	You Can Dance	French	Benjamin Castaldi	NT1	16-02-2012	1	Discontinued
Germany	You Can Dance	German	Anna Maier	Sat.1	2010	1	Discontinued
Georgia	Shen Shegidzelia Cekva	Georgian		Imedi TV (Seasons 1–2)	2016	1; 2	Discontinued
Greece	So You Think You Can Dance	Greek	Vicky Kaya (Seasons 1–2); Doukissa Nomikou (Season 3)	Mega Channel (Season 1–2); ANT1 (Season 3)	01-02-2007; 2017	1; 2; 3	Discontinued
India	So You Think You Can Dance	Hindi	Rithvik Dhanjani & Mouni Roy	&TV	24-04-2016	1	Discontinued
Israel	Nolad Lirkod	Hebrew	Zvika Hadar	Channel 2	02-12-2005	1; 2; 3	Discontinued
Kazakhstan	Bïle, Qazaqstan!	Kazakh; Russian	Aisulu Azimbayeva & Aset Arystanbekov	Khabar	24-09-2016	1; 2	Discontinued
Lithuania	Tu gali šokti	Lithuanian	Mindaugas Meškauskas	TV3	11-04-2010	1; 2	Discontinued
Malaysia	So You Think You Can Dance	English; Malaysian	Juliana Ibrahim (Season 1); Jehan Miski (Season 1); Aishah Sinclair (Season 2)	8TV	05-04-2007	1; 2	Discontinued
New Zealand	So You Think You Can Dance	English	Shane Cortese	TV3	2006	1	Discontinued
Norway	Dansefeber	Norwegian	Kjetil Tefke & Henriette Lien	TVNorge	2006	1; 2	Discontinued
Poland	You Can Dance – Po prostu tańcz!	Polish	Kinga Rusin (Seasons 1–5); Patricia Kazadi (Seasons 6–9); Maciej Dowbor (Seasons 10–)	TVN	05-09-2007	1; 2; 3; 4; 5; 6; 7; 8; 9; 10	Ongoing
Poland	You Can Dance – Nowa generacja	Polish	Ida Nowakowska (Season 1); Edyta Herbuś (Season 2)	TVP2 / TVP1	10-09-2021	1; 2	Discontinued
Portugal	Achas que Sabes Dançar?	Portuguese	João Manzarra (Season 1); Diana Chaves (Season 2)	SIC	30-05-2010	1; 2	Discontinued
(Sweden) (Norway) (Denmark); Scandinavia	So You Think You Can Dance Scandinavia	Swedish; Norwegian; Danish	Kicki Berg; Henriette Lien; Vicki Jo	Kanal 5 TVNorge; Kanal 5	28-02-2008; 13-03-2008; 13-03-2008	1	Discontinued
South Africa	So You Think You Can Dance	English	Sade Giliberti	SABC 1	07-02-2007	1; 2; 3	Discontinued
Tunisia	So You Think You Can Dance	Darija	Walid Al Salami	El Hiwar El Tounsi	31-01-2019	1	Discontinued
Turkey	Dans Eder misin? (Seasons 1–4); Dans Eder misin? Yaz Ateşi (Season 5); Huysuz'la Dans Eder misin? (Season 6)	Turkish	Güzide Duran (Seasons 1–5); Seyfi Dursunoğlu (Season 6)	KanalD (1–3); FOX (4) aTV (5); ShowTV (6)	2007	1; 2; 3; 4; 5; 6	Discontinued
Ukraine	Tancyuyut Vsi!	Ukrainian; Russian	Lilia Rebryk & Dmytro Tankovich	STB	12-09-2008	1; 2; 3; 4; 5; 6; 7; 8; 9	Discontinued
Ukraine	TBA	TBA	TBA	Sweet.tv	2026	TBA	Upcoming season
United Kingdom	So You Think You Can Dance	English	Cat Deeley	BBC One	02-01-2010	1; 2	Discontinued
United States	So You Think You Can Dance	English	Lauren Sánchez (Season 1); Cat Deeley (Season 2–18)	Fox	20-07-2005	1; 2; 3; 4; 5; 6; 7; 8; 9; 10; 11; 12; 13; 14; 15; 16; 17; 18	Discontinued
Vietnam	Thử thách cùng bước nhảy: So You Think You Can Dance	Vietnamese	Huỳnh Trấn Thành (Seasons 1–4); Chí Thiện & Chibi Hoàng Yến (Season 5)	HTV7	15-09-2012	1; 2; 3; 4; 5	Discontinued
UAE	So You Think You Can Dance, Tahady Al Raqs	Arabic	Faisal Al Mubarak	Al Dar 1	2024-11-10	1	Ongoing

Notes

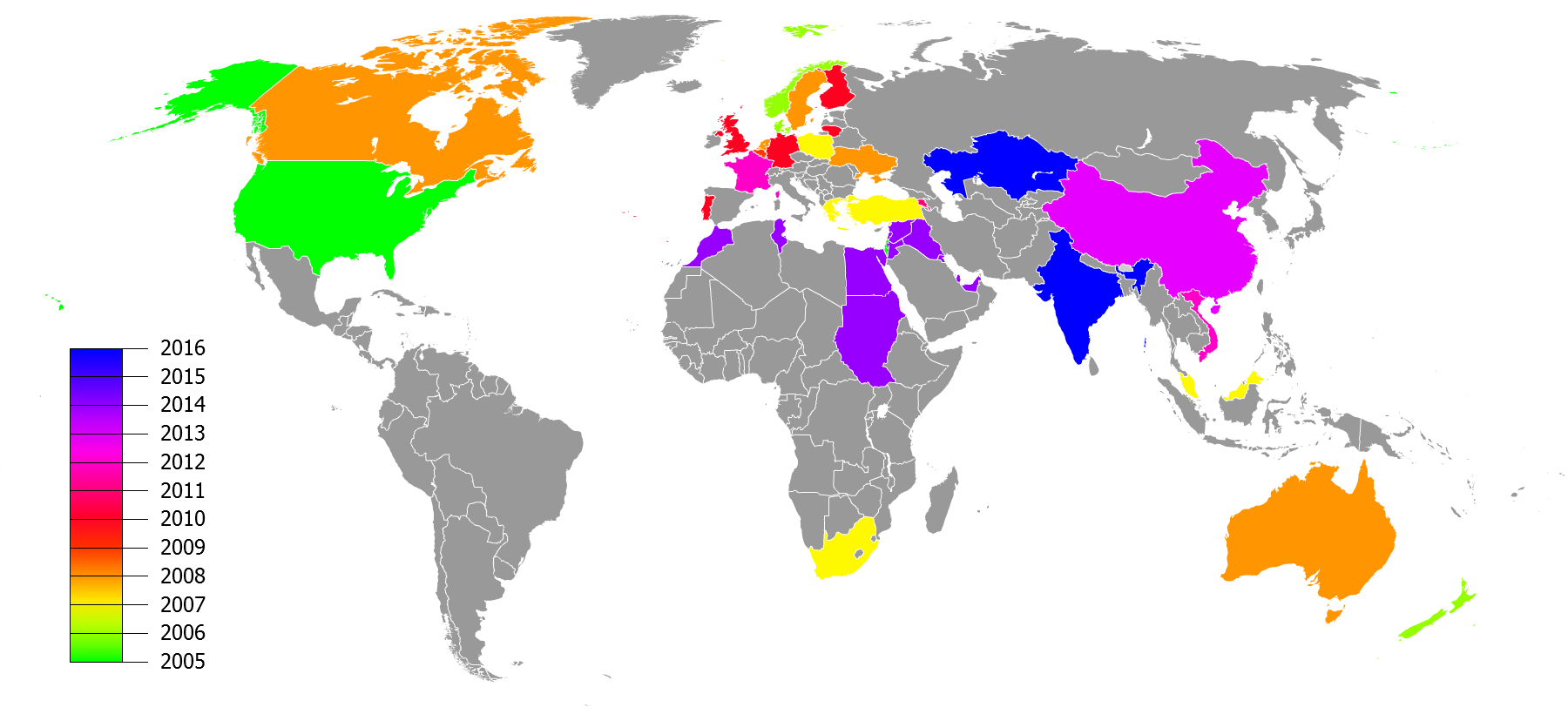
The So You Think You Can Dance franchise has broadcast localized versions of the show in 39 countries since its premiere in the summer of 2005.

== International competition ==
In March 2014, CCTV broadcast a promotional episode in which notable dancers from the American and Chinese versions of So You Think You Can Dance competed directly against one another as teams. Titled Zhōngměi Wǔ Lín Guànjūn Duìkàngsài - Super Dancer Born Tonight, the show was shot in Las Vegas but has yet to see a release or announcement in the U.S. The episode featured head-to-head competition between "all-stars" in the form of solos and duets and was judged by an international panel.

== The Next Generation ==
In 2013, the producers of the Dutch version of So You Think You Can Dance announced a spin-off series, titled So You Think You Can Dance: The Next Generation, featuring dancers younger than those typically featured on the traditional entries in the franchise. The spin-off lasted only one season. In 2016, producers adapted a similar format for the 13th season of the American series, with competitors between the ages of 8 and 13. Starting in 2021, a Polish revival of the show also uses an iteration of this format.

== See also ==
- Dance on television

=== Similar shows ===
- The Ultimate Dance Battle
- Live to Dance/Got to Dance
- America's Best Dance Crew
- Superstars of Dance
- Dance India Dance
- Se Ela Dança, Eu Danço
