= So You Think You Can Dance: The Next Generation =

So You Think You Can Dance: The Next Generation may refer to:

- So You Think You Can Dance: The Next Generation (American TV series)
- So You Think You Can Dance: The Next Generation (Dutch TV series)
- So You Think You Can Dance: The Next Generation (Polish TV series)
