= So You Think You Can Dance (Malaysian TV series) =

- Created by: Nigel Lythgoe; Simon Fuller
- Directed by: Zebedee De Costa; Tengku Firhad
- Presented by: Aishah Sinclair (S2); Juliana Ibrahim (S1); Jehan Miskin (S1)
- Starring: Pat Ibrahim; Judimar Hernandez; Yannus Sufandi; Manuela Oliveira; Ramli Ibrahim
- Country of origin: Malaysia
- No. of episodes: 14

Production
- Executive producer: Sunil Kumar
- Producers: Zebedee De Costa; Tengku Firhad; Kiedd Fariz Aziz; Manoj Nandy
- Editors: Howie Chin Yeong Hau; Chan Yee Wei (S1); Shivadas Menon
- Running time: Varies

Original release
- Network: 8TV
- Release: April 5, 2007 – August 1, 2008

So You Think You Can Dance is a dance reality show and competition aired on 8TV. Based closely on the original U.S. show by the same name, the series premiered on April 5, 2007.

The show was created by Simon Fuller (known for the Idol series) and Nigel Lythgoe. The Malaysian entry in the So You Think You Can Dance franchise lasted two seasons and ended in 2008 after crowning champions Muhammad Haslam Abdul Rahman Rubaee (season 1), and Cecilia Yong Li Shi (season 2).

== Format ==
=== Auditions ===
Preliminary auditions are held in selected locations. Participants who display a good degree of potential to them are recalled to the Callbacks (if their skills are debatable) or qualify directly to the Boot Camp (if they greatly impress the judges during the auditions).

=== Callbacks ===
Those who qualify for the callbacks are required to undergo versatility and cohesiveness tests while vying for remaining places in the Boot Camp where there have been participants who have qualified directly from the Auditions. In this sense, versatility discusses participants' ability to project as many styles and techniques of dance as possible.

=== Boot Camp ===
Again, contestants who have qualified to this point are given a tougher versatility and cohesiveness which explores their preparedness for the next stage – the live competition. The Boot Camp will be divided into group and individual test sessions. Their emotions and mental strength may be tested as well throughout in preparation for the live competitions. A proportionate number of male and female contestants (usually 10 and 10, respectively) will qualify for the live shows.

=== Live shows ===
The most anticipated part of the show witnesses the performances of those who qualified from the Boot Camp live on television. Each show is divided into three sub-events: contestants perform in pairs (one male and one female) to entertain viewers, and at the same time, to be evaluated by a panel of three or four judges; the judges then selected the (four or six, gender-proportionate) worst-performing finalists to vie for survival in the competition by public voting; the one male and one female with the lowest votes leave the competition. Later shows will witness the pairs performing more than one dance routine as the number of finalists decimate along the way.

=== Grand Finale ===
At this point, two male and two female finalists remain to vie for public votes and ultimately, the grand prize which only the champion takes home. They may have to perform more routines in a night, including two solo routines and one same-gender pair-up. Guest dancers and singers are also invited to perform. The night closes ceremoniously with the winner announcement.

== Season 1 ==
The inaugural season of So You Think You Can Dance took off with one audition session in Kuala Lumpur on 16 and 17 March 2007. Out of about 500 people auditioning, seven skipped into the Boot Camp while 80 qualified for the Callbacks. From the eighty, thirty-three joined the Boot Camp to fill in the Top 40 before the judges only allowed 20 to proceed into the live competition.

Live shows were held for nine weeks from 3 May till 29 June 2007. Initially, the judges in this stage picked a bottom four for each of the first four weeks, after which the judges decided to select a bottom six to address finalists' competitiveness until the penultimate live show. Noor Fatimah and Mohd Yunus were notably the only contestants to avoid the danger zone until they were cut out of the Grand Finale on week 8.

In the Grand Finale on 29 June 2007, Muhammad Haslam Abdul Rahman Rubaee, fondly known as Alam, was declared the winner and clinched RM50,000 cash and a role in one of Tiara Jacquelina's theatre roles. Dennis Yin, Suhaili Micheline and Brancy Tan filled the second, third and fourth places, respectively.

== Season 2 ==
On 9 March 2008, a day after the Malaysian general elections, auditions for season 2 kicked off in Kota Kinabalu, to be followed by Kuala Lumpur on 18 March. Telecast is scheduled to commence on 1 May.

== See also ==
- Dance on television
- The Ultimate Dance Battle
- Live to Dance/Got to Dance
- America's Best Dance Crew
- Superstars of Dance
- Dance India Dance
- Se Ela Dança, Eu Danço
