= Nolad Lirkod =

- Presented by: Zvika Hadar
- Country of origin: Israel
- No. of seasons: 3

Production
- Running time: Approx. 60 minutes

Original release
- Network: Channel 2
- Release: December 2005 – March 2008

Nolad Lirkod (Hebrew:נולד לרקוד) or Born to Dance was an Israeli televised dance competition with a format based on the American show So You Think You Can Dance. Airing on Israel's Channel 2 and hosted by Zvika Hadar, the show premiered in late 2005 and finished its run in spring of 2008, after broadcasting three seasons. Like other shows in the So You Think You Can Dance franchise, Nolad Lirkod was a talent search in which dancers from a wide variety of stylistic backgrounds competed in a broad selection of dance genres and were advanced between rounds through a combination of at-home-viewer call-in votes and decisions by a panel of expert judges.

== Winners ==
- 2006 First season : Or Kahlon
- 2007 Second season : Julia Igelnik
- 2008 Third season : Netanel Blaish

== See also ==
- Dance on television
