= Dance Suomi =

Finnish television show

- Also known as: Dance
- Presented by: Axl Smith
- Judges: Marco Bjurström; Merja Satulehto
- Country of origin: Finland
- No. of seasons: 1

Original release
- Network: Nelonen
- Release: 29 August 2010

Related
- So You Think You Can Dance

Dance Suomi, or simply Dance, is a Finnish televised dance competition with a format based on the American dance show So You Think You Can Dance. As with other shows in the So You Think You Can Dance franchise, the competition places young dancers from a wide variety of stylistic backgrounds in competition, with a combination of judge decisions and at-home-viewer votes deciding who persists in the competition from week to week. The show is hosted by television personality Caro Axel Smith (credited as "Axl" Smith) and has a judge's panel formed by Marco Bjurström and Merja Satulehto, with a third rotating seat for guest judges. The first season's winner, awarded a cash prize and a dance school scholarship opportunity in New York, was Sam Vaherlehto.

== Season 1 ==
Open auditions for the first season of the series were held in 2010 in Helsinki, Tampere, and Oulu. Over 400 dancers applied and auditioned for the show. Of these, the judges panel selected 60 dancers for their boot camp "shortlist". From these 60 competitors the season's Top 16 were selected to compete in the first season's live shows.

=== Top 16 contestants ===
- Henri Sarajärvi
- Ida Holmlund
- Ima Iduozee
- Jenni Jokikokko
- Jere Jääskeläinen
- Joonas Sakki
- Katri Mäkinen
- Laura Allonen
- Markku Haussila†
- Mia-Mari Sinkkonen†
- Pasi Mäkelä
- Pauliina Laaksonen
- Sam Vaherlehto†
- Sebastian Wennström
- Sirja Lepistö
- Taru Miettinen†

†= Top 4 Finalist

=== Choreographers ===
- Jaakko Toivonen
- Nora Mahmoud
- Sari Louko
- Ranses Charon
- Ida Jousmäki
- Lasse Hyttinen
- Petri Kauppinen
- Minna Tervamäki
- Peter Pihlström
- Mindy Lindblom
- Reija Wäre
- Katja Koukkula
- Jussi Väänänen
- Ambra Succi

== See also ==
- Dance on television
