= Everybody Dance! (TV series) =

Ukrainian television program

- Ukrainian: Танцюють всі!
- Presented by: Lily Rebryk, Dmitry Tankovych
- Country of origin: Ukraine
- No. of seasons: 9

Production
- Running time: 2-4 hours

Original release
- Network: STB
- Release: September 12, 2008 – December 30, 2016

Related
- So You Think You Can Dance

Tancyuyut Vsi! (Танцюють всі! in its original Ukrainian orthography and translated in English as Everybody Dance!) is a television program which airs on the Ukrainian channel STB and is based on the format of the American series So You Think You Can Dance. The series, hosted by Lily Rebryk and Dmitry Tankovych, first premiered in September 2008. The winner of the competition receives between ₴150,000 and ₴250,000 and occasionally further prizes.

== Format ==
External images
- №-1
- №-2
- №-3
- №-4

The show shared many style and format elements with other entries in the So You Think You Can Dance franchise, including the general premise of challenging dancers from a wide variety of stylistic backgrounds to tackle a variety of dance genres. A season began with open auditions, held throughout Ukraine, where hopeful contestants performed before a judge's panel of dance experts. From this initial talent pool, 100 dancers (later this number grew up to 200) were selected to attend extensive workshops and testing over the course of a week in Yalta or, from 5th season, some place near Kyiv (similar to the "Vegas Week" and "Boot Camp" portions of other So You Think You Can Dance shows). From these 100 dancers, 20 (22 in seasons 5-8 and 40 in season 9) were ultimately chosen to take part in the live performance shows. In season 5, two additional dancers were chosen by viewer voting. Over successive weeks, these finalists (paired in male-female couples) danced duets, solos, and group routines in a variety of styles in order to stay in the competition, with one male and one female dancer being eliminated each week through a combination of at-home-viewer voting and judge panel decisions until a Top 4 finale, when the champion was crowned. On sixth week of season 5 the rules were changed slightly, allowing to eliminate dancers regardless of their sex. In season 6, the rules were changed so that the "top 20" had to contest in the Trials and only the "top 10" (which actually consisted of 12 dancers in seasons 6-7 and 8 dancers in season 8) got to dance in the live performance shows.

== Seasons overview ==
Season	Year	Winner	Finalists			Hosts	Judges			
1	2008	Alexander Ostanin (Tap)	Alexander Leschenko (Contemporary)	Natalia Krotova (Modern)	Mariam Turkmenbayeva (Hip-Hop)	Lily Rebryk	Vladislav Yama	Alexander Bobik	Francisco Gomez	Alex Litvinov
2	2009	Natalia Lihaj (Jazz)	Ekatherina Buhtyyarova (Contemporary)	Eugene Karjakin (Ballroom)	Sergey Zmiyok (Jazz)	Lily Rebryk; Dmitry Tankovych	Vladislav Yama	Tatyana Denisova	Francisco Gomez	Alex Litvinov
3	2010	Alexander Gerashchenko (National/Breakdance)	Nikita Eremin (Popping)	Anna Teslya (Contemporary)	Angela Karaseva (Hip-Hop)	Lily Rebryk; Dmitry Tankovych	Vladislav Yama	Tatyana Denisova	Francisco Gomez	Alex Litvinov
4	2011	Vasil Kozar (Contemporary)	Rodion Farhshatov (Ballet)	Tisato Ishikawa (Ballet)	Galina Pyeha (Ballroom)	Lily Rebryk; Dmitry Tankovych	Vladislav Yama	Tatyana Denisova	Francisco Gomez	Alex Litvinov
Seasons 1-4 Battle	2012	Eugene Cote/Mariam Turkmenbayeva	Vasil Kozar/Kateryna Bilyavska	Roman Dmytryk/Ilona Gvozdeva	Eugene Karjakin/Natalia Lihaj	Lily Rebryk; Dmitry Tankovych	Vladislav Yama	Tatyana Denisova	Francisco Gomez	Alex Litvinov
5	2012	Ildar Tagirov (Jazz)	Olga Shapovalova (Contemporary)	Anton Rybalchenko (Ballroom/Contemporary)	Alexander Volkov (Fusion)	Lily Rebryk; Dmitry Tankovych	Vladislav Yama	Tatyana Denisova	Konstantin Tomilchenko	Radu Poklitaru
6	2013	Vladimir Rakov (Contemporary)	Yana Zaets (Contemporary)	Dmitry Shchebet (B-Boying)	Nikita Kravchenko (Ballroom)	Lily Rebryk; Dmitry Tankovych	Vladislav Yama	Tatyana Denisova	Konstantin Tomilchenko	Radu Poklitaru
7	2014	Daniel Sibilli (Contemporary)	Dmitry Maslennikov (Modern)	Ekatherina Klishina (Ballroom)	Anna Nikolenko (Contemporary)	Lily Rebryk; Dmitry Tankovych	Vladislav Yama	Tatyana Denisova	Konstantin Tomilchenko	Radu Poklitaru
8	2015	Ildar Gainutdinov (Contemporary/Hip-Hop)	Elina Antonova (Contemporary)	Ilya Chizhik (National)	Anna Korostelyova (Jazz-Modern)	Lily Rebryk; Dmitry Tankovych	Vladislav Yama	Tatyana Denisova	Konstantin Tomilchenko	
9	2016	Mihai Ungureanu (Ballroom)	Vlad Kurochka (B-boying)	Vlad Litvinenko (B-boying)	Bogdan Urkhov (Contemporary)	Lily Rebryk; Dmitry Tankovych	Vladislav Yama	Tatyana Denisova		Radu Poklitaru

Legend	Male contestant	Female contestant

== Season One ==
Top 20:Victoria Martynova, Dennis Hrystyuk, Lydia Shramko, Mariam Turkmenbayeva, Mikhail Smagin, Sergei Rudenko, Maxim Pekniy, Alexander Ostanin, Dennis Mirhoyazov, Daria Malikova, Vadim Lyashchenko, Alexander Leshchenko, Natalie Krotova, Eugene Cote, Lyubov Zarembo, Yana Dudnik, Olga Goldys, Maria Bezyakina, Nicholay Boychenko, Oleg Zhezhel.

== Season Two ==
Top 20: Victoria Skytska, Katerina Buhtyyarova, Ilona Gvozdyova, Yaroclava Slonova, Artem (Tyoma) Volosov, Andriy (Andres) Hlushyk, Artem Gordeev, Roman Dmytryk, Valentina Marinina, Alyona Perepelytsa, Igor Horbonos, Andriy Gutsal, Sergiy Zmiyok, Alina Nizyayeva, Vitaliy Zagoruyko, Eugene Karjakin, Katerina (Katya) Karjakina, Natalia Lihaj, Inna Mazurenko, Oleg Patrakov.

Contestant	Week 1	Week 2	Week 3	Week 4	Week 5	Week 6	Week 7	Week 8	Finals	Finals	Finals
Natalia Lihaj	Tango; Andriy	Contemporary; Andriy	Broadway; Andriy	Cha-cha-cha; Andriy	Disco; Andriy	Lyrical Jazz; Roman	Contemporary, Cha-cha-cha; Artem	Jazz, Quickstep; Sergiy	Free dance Eugene	Tango; Katerina	Pasodoble; Sergiy
Katerina Buhtyyarova	Swing; Oleg	Jazz; Oleg	Contemporary; Oleg	Waltz; Igor Soronovych	Afro-Jazz; Tyoma	Rumba; Artem	Tango, Broadway; Sergiy	Waltz, Broadway; Eugene	Free dance Sergiy	Tango; Natalia	Pasodoble; Eugene
Eugene Karjakin	Contemporary; Alina	Folk (India); Alina	Hip-hop; Alina	Rock-n-roll; Inna	Jazz; Inna	Contemporary; Victoria	Swing, Folk; Ilona	Waltz, Broadway; Katerina	Free dance Natalia	Free dance Sergiy	Pasodoble; Katerina
Sergiy Zmiyok	Flamenco; Katya	Salsa; Katya	Quickstep; Katya	Contemporary; Katya	Tango; Katya	Jive; Ilona	Tango, Broadway; Katerina	Jazz, Quickstep; Natalia	Free dance Katerina	Free dance Eugene	Pasodoble; Natalia
Roman Dmytryk	Jazz; Ilona	Contemporary; Ilona	Swing; Ilona	Samba; Ilona	Contemporary; Ilona	Lyrical Jazz; Natalia	Disco, Contemporary; Victoria	Rock-n-Roll, Contemporary; Ilona			
Ilona Gvozdyova	Jazz; Roman	Contemporary; Roman	Swing; Roman	Samba; Roman	Contemporary; Roman	Jive; Sergiy	Swing, Folk; Eugene	Rock-n-Roll, Contemporary; Roman			
Artem Gordeev	Broadway; Victoria	Jive; Victoria	Pasodoble; Victoria	Contemporary; Victoria	Waltz; Victoria	Rumba; Katerina	Contemporary, Cha-cha-cha; Natalia				
Victoria Skytska	Broadway; Artem	Jive; Artem	Pasodoble; Artem	Contemporary; Artem	Waltz; Artem	Contemporary; Eugene	Disco, Contemporary; Roman				
Andriy Gutsal	Tango; Natalia	Contemporary; Natalia	Broadway; Natalia	Cha-cha-cha; Natalia	Disco; Natalia	Contemporary; Katya					
Katya Karjakina	Flamenco; Sergiy	Salsa; Sergiy	Quickstep; Sergiy	Contemporary; Sergiy	Tango; Sergiy	Contemporary; Andriy					
Tyoma Volosov	Hip-hop; Valentina	Cha-cha-cha; Valentina	Argentine tango Valentina	Jazz; Tonya	Afro-Jazz; Katerina						
Inna Mazurenko	Disco; Vitaliy	Hip-hop; Vitaliy	Contemporary; Vitaliy	Rock-n-Roll; Eugene	Jazz; Eugene						
Oleg Patrakov	Swing; Katerina	Jazz; Katerina	Contemporary; Katerina	got ill	officially left						
Valentina Marinina	Hip-hop; Tyoma	Cha-cha-cha; Tyoma	Argentine tango Tyoma	left the show on her own accord							
Vitaliy Zagoruyko	Disco; Inna	Hip-hop; Inna	Contemporary; Inna								
Alina Nizyayeva	Contemporary; Eugene	Folk (India); Eugene	Hip-hop; Eugene								
Andres Hlushyk	Contemporary; Olena	Disco; Olena									
Olena Perepelytsa	Contemporary; Andres	Disco; Andres									
Igor Horbonos	Pasodoble; Yaroclava										
Yaroclava Slonova	Pasodoble; Igor										

Legend	Solo in nomination	Left the show

== Season Three ==
Top 20: Anna Teslya, Fedir Hashalov, Eugenia (Genya) Khramova, Evgeny Panchenko, Tisato Ishikawa, Maxim Orobets, Julia Sahnevych, Eugene Kulakovskiy, Olena Pul, Konstantin (Kostya) Koval, Daria Olkhovska, Makar Kilivnik, Martha Zhyr, Anton (Tony) Kyba, Adriana Kostetska, Nikita Eryomin, Angela Karasyova, Anton Davidenko, Eugenia Dekhtyarenko, Alexander Gerashchenko

Contestant	Week 1	Week 2	Week 3	Week 4	Week 5	Week 6	Week 7	Week 8	Final
Alexander Gerashchenko	swing Martha	contemporary Martha	hip-hop Martha	samba Martha	rock-n-roll Martha	jazz Martha	rock-n-roll, jazz Anna	contemporary, samba Angela	
Nikita Eryomin	contemporary Tisato	hip-hop Tisato	modern Tisato	jazz Tisato	rumba Eugenia	samba Eugenia	twist, jazz Angela	jazz, contemporary Anna	
Anna Teslya	waltz Evgeny	jazz Evgeny	swing Evgeny	contemporary Evgeny	modern Evgeny	modern Tony	rock-n-roll, jazz Alexander	jazz, contemporary Nikita	
Angela Karasyova	hip-hop Maxim	jazz Maxim	quickstep Maxim	contemporary Tony	jive Tony	tango Evgeny	twist, jazz Nikita	contemporary, samba Alexander	
Evgeny Panchenko	waltz Anna	jazz Anna	swing Anna	contemporary Anna	modern Anna	tango Angela	contemporary, rumba Olena	tango, modern Martha	
Martha Zhyr	swing Alexander	contemporary Alexander	hip-hop Alexander	samba Alexander	rock-n-roll Alexander	swing Anton	waltz, contemporary Tony	tango, modern Evgeny	
Tony Kyba	pasodoble Adriana	disco Daria	modern Daria	contemporary Angela	jive Angela	modern Anna	waltz, contemporary Martha		
Olena Pul	contemporary Anton	jive Anton	hip-hop Anton	jazz-funk Anton	contemporary Anton	jazz Alexander	contemporary, rumba Evgeny		
Anton Davidenko	contemporary Olena	jive Olena	hip-hop Olena	jazz-funk Olena	contemporary Olena	swing Martha			
Eugenia Dekhtyarenko	jazz Kostya	hip-hop Kostya	pasodoble Makar	modern Makar	rumba Nikita	samba Nikita			
Fedir Hashalov	jazz Genya	cha-cha-cha Genya	waltz Genya	salsa Genya	contemporary Genya				
Eugenia (Genya) Khramova	jazz Fedir	cha-cha-cha Fedir	waltz Fedir	salsa Fedir	contemporary Fedir				
Makar Kilivnik	lyrical jazz Julia	contemporary Jessica	pasodoble Eugenia	modern Eugenia					
Tisato Ishikawa	contemporary Nikita	hip-hop Nikita	modern Nikita	jazz Nikita	broke her finger				
Maxim Orobets	hip-hop Angela	jazz Angela	quickstep Angela						
Daria Olkhovska	tango Eugene	disco Tony	modern Tony						
Konstantin (Kostya) Koval	jazz Eugenia	hip-hop Eugenia							
Julia Sahnevych	lyrical jazz Makar	broke her finger							
Eugene Kulakovskiy	tango Daria								
Adriana Kostetska	pasodoble Tony								

Legend	Solo in nomination	Left the show

== Season Four ==
Top 20: Sergey Poyarkov, Rodion Farhshatov, Maria Kozlova, Maxim Bochahin, Julia Kudynova, Lydia Soklakova, Tisato Ishikawa, Ilya Vermenych, Alexander (Sasha) Varenko, Vitaly Savchenko, Anastasia Rychkova, Galina (Galya) Pyeha, Anastasia (Nastya) Sergeeva, Kateryna (Katya) Bilyavska, Anatoly (Tolik) Sachivko, Elena Ignatieva, Vasil Kozar, Zoya Sahanenko, Vitaly (Vitalik) Galkin, Ivan Drozdov.

Contestant	Week 1	Week 2	Week 3	Week 4	Week 5	Week 6	Week 7	Week 8	Final
Vasyl Kozar	hip-hop Maria	contemporary Maria	rock-n-roll Maria	tango Maria	jazz Maria	jazz Zoya	jazz, pasodoble Katya	contemporary, pasodoble Tisato	modern, samba, jazz
Rodion Farhshatov	tango Elena	jazz Elena	modern Katya	contemporary Katya	pasodoble Katya	tango Tisato	cha-cha-cha, modern Galya	jazz, tango Galya	modern, jive, jazz
Tisato Ishikawa	contemporary Ilya	pasodoble Ilya	ballet Ilya	modern Ilya	hip-hop Ilya	tango Rodion	jive, modern Sergey	contemporary, pasodoble Vasyl	modern, jive, jazz
Galina (Galya) Pyeha	hip-hop Tolik	modern Tolik	rumba Tolik	swing Tolik	contemporary Tolik	contemporary Ilya	cha-cha-cha, modern Rodion	jazz, tango Rodion	modern, samba, jazz
Sergey Poyarkov	waltz Zoya	jazz Zoya	contemporary Zoya	modern Zoya	quickstep Zoya	pasodoble Maria	jive, modern Olena	rumba, jazz Katya	
Kateryna (Katya) Bilyavska	jazz Vitalik	contemporary Vitalik	modern Rodion	contemporary Rodion	pasodoble Rodion	rumba Tolik	jazz, pasodoble Vasyl	rumba, jazz Sergey	
Anatoly (Tolik) Sachivko	hip-hop Galya	modern Galya	rumba Galya	swing Galya	contemporary Galya	rumba Katya	rock-n-roll, jazz Maria		
Maria Kozlova	hip-hop Vasyl	contemporary Vasyl	rock-n-roll Vasyl	tango Vasyl	jazz Vasyl	pasodoble Sergey	rock-n-roll, jazz Tolik		
Ilya Vermenych	contemporary Tisato	pasodoble Tisato	ballet Tisato	modern Tisato	hip-hop Tisato	contemporary Galya			
Zoya Sahanenko	waltz Sergey	jazz Sergey	contemporary Sergey	modern Sergey	quickstep Sergey	jazz Vasyl			
Ivan Drozdov	modern Lydia	jive Lydia	hip-hop Lydia	contemporary Lydia	waltz Lydia				
Lydia Soklakova	modern Ivan	jive Ivan	hip-hop Ivan	contemporary Ivan	waltz Ivan				
Vitaly Savchenko	swing Julia	hip-hop Julia	jazz Julia	rumba Julia					
Julia Kudynova	swing Vitaly	hip-hop Vitaly	jazz Vitaly	rumba Vitaly					
Alexander (Sasha) Varenko	contemporary Anastasia	swing Nastya	waltz Nastya						
Anastasia (Nastya) Sergeeva	folk Maxim	swing Sasha	waltz Sasha						
Vitaly (Vitalik) Galkin	jazz Katya	contemporary Katya							
Elena Ignatieva	tango Rodion	jazz Rodion							
Maxim Bochahin	folk Nastya								
Anastasia Rychkova	contemporary Sasha								

Legend	Solo in nomination	Left the show

== Season 1-4 Battle ("Повернення героїв") ==
Pair of contestants	Week 1	Week 2	Week 3	Week 4	Week 5	Week 6	Week 7	Week 8	Week 9	Week 10	Week 11	Place
Mariam Turkmenbayeva/ Eugene Cote	waltz	modern	broadway	modern	hip-hop	jive, contemporary	disco, modern	modern, pasodoble	contemporary, broadway	hip-hop, cha-cha-cha	jazz, tango	Winners
Kateryna (Katya) Bilyavska/ Vasyl Kozar	jazz	hip-hop	modern	contemporary	rock-n-roll	disco, contemporary	samba, modern	contemporary, pasodoble	rumba, broadway	jazz, contemporary	jazz, tango	2 place
Ilona Gvozdyova/ Roman Dmytryk	contemporary	broadway	swing	pasodoble	jazz	broadway, contemporary	modern, modern	cha-cha-cha, pasodoble	jazz, broadway	rumba, contemporary	jazz, tango	3 place
Natalia Lihaj/ Eugene Karjakin	tango	contemporary	pasodoble	cha-cha-cha	jazz-funk	pasodoble, contemporary	broadway, modern	jazz, pasodoble	contemporary, broadway	jazz, foxtrot		
Alexander (Sasha) Gerashchenko/ Martha Zhyr-Gerashchenko	hip-hop	jive	modern	quickstep	waltz	charleston, contemporary	jazz, modern	jazz-modern, pasadoble	samba, broadway			
Anatoly (Tolik) Sachivko/ Galina (Galya) Pyeha	modern	modern	contemporary	jazz	tango	jazz, contemporary	waltz, modern	jive, pasodoble				
Angela Karasyova/ Tony Kyba	contemporary	swing	waltz	jazz-funk	rumba	modern, contemporary	contemporary, modern					
Tisato Ishikawa/ Ilya Vermenych	ballet	tango	jive	waltz	contemporary	rumba, contemporary						
Evgeny Panchenko/ Olena Pul	-	foxtrot	tango	jazz	contemporary							
Mykola (Kolya) Boychenko/ Daria Malikova	broadway	waltz	jazz	hip-hop								
Katerina Buhtyyarova/ Sergiy Zmiyok	broadway	cha-cha-cha	rock-n-roll									
Alexander Ostanin/ Tonya Rudenko-Hrystyuk	swing	rock-n-roll										

Legend	Nomination	Left the show

== Season Five ==
Top 22: Alisa Zaitseva, Anna Edinak, Anton Rybalchenko, Vlad Korsunenko, Ekaterina (Katya) Gubskaya, Nikita Vasilenko, Polina Bokova, Angelica Nikolayeva, Oleksiy (Lyosha) Kucherenko, Artem Shoshin, Alexander (Sasha) Volkov, Danila Sitnikov, Dima Chopenko, Ildar Tagirov, Sveta Cambur, Sonia Gevorkyan, Sophya Chaudhary, Tanya Danilevskaya, Olga Shapovalova, Julian Tsurcanu, Eugene Rogozenko, Jeanna Terentyeva.

Contestant	Week 1	Week 2	Week 3	Week 4	Week 5	Week 6	Week 7	Week 8	Week 9	Final
Ildar Tagirov	broadway	rumba Anna	disco Anna	tango Anna	jazz Anna	modern Anna	contemporary Polina	modern, hip-hop Danila	jazz, pasodoble	Winner
Olga Shapovalova	contemporary	alternative contemporary Nikita	broadway Nikita	rock-n-roll Nikita	foxtrot Nikita	broadway Nikita	broadway Dima	waltz, jazz Sasha	jazz, samba	2
Anton Rybalchenko	tango	broadway Tanya	hip-hop Tanya	rumba Tanya	jazz-pop Tanya	contemporary Tanya	jazz Nikita	jive, contemporary Sveta	jazz, tango	3
Alexander (Sasha) Volkov	modern	rock-n-roll Alisa	quickstep Alisa	contemporary Alisa	jazz Alisa	tango Alisa	modern Sveta	waltz, jazz Olga	contemporary, pasodoble	4
Danila Sitnikov	hip-hop	modern Sophya	waltz Sophya	hip-hop Sophya	modern Sophya	jazz Polina	cha-cha-cha Anna	modern, hip-hop Ildar	jazz, samba	
Anna Edinak	modern	rumba Ildar	disco Ildar	tango Ildar	jazz Ildar	modern Ildar	cha-cha-cha Danila	rumba, jazz Dima	contemporary, tango	
Dima Chopenko	tango	jazz Sveta	samba Sveta	modern Sveta	jazz-modern Sveta	folk Sveta	broadway Olga	rumba, contemporary Anna		
Sveta Cambur	contemporary	jazz Dima	samba Dima	modern Dima	jazz-modern Dima	folk Dima	modern Sasha	jive, contemporary Anton		
Nikita Vasilenko	contemporary	alternative contemporary Olga	broadway Olga	rock-n-roll Olga	foxtrot Olga	broadway Olga	jazz Anton			
Polina Bokova	tango	waltz Julian	contemporary Julian	jive Artem	pasodoble Artem	jazz Danila	contemporary Ildar			
Oleksiy (Lyosha) Kucherenko	-	cha-cha-cha Angelica	jazz-modern Angelica	broadway Angelica	contemporary Angelica	modern Angelica				
Angelica Nikolayeva	-	cha-cha-cha Lyosha	jazz-modern Lyosha	broadway Lyosha	contemporary Lyosha	modern Lyosha				
Alisa Zaitseva	modern (?)	rock-n-roll Sasha	quickstep Sasha	contemporary Sasha	jazz Sasha	tango Sasha				
Tanya Danilevskaya	jazz-funk	broadway Anton	hip-hop Anton	rumba Anton	jazz-pop Anton	contemporary Anton				
Artem Shoshin	modern	contemporary Katya	modern Katya	jive Polina	pasodoble Polina					
Sophya Chaudhary	broadway	modern Danila	waltz Danila	hip-hop Danila	modern Danila					
Vlad Korsunenko	hip-hop	pasodoble Jeanna	jazz Sonia	contemporary Sonia						
Sonia Gevorkyan	jazz-funk	hip-hop Eugene	jazz Vlad	contemporary Vlad						
Ekaterina (Katya) Gubskaya	broadway	contemporary Artem	modern Artem	left on her own accord						
Julian Tsurcanu	modern (?)	waltz Polina	contemporary Polina							
Eugene Rogozenko	hip-hop	hip-hop Sonya								
Jeanna Terentyeva	modern (?)	pasodoble Vlad								

Legend	Solo in nomination	Left the show

== Season Six ==
Top 22: Alysa Dotsenko, Elena Holovan, Ilya Kiselnikov, Alexander Semenov, Irina Kreydina, Oleg Klevakin, Andrei Kalugin, Valeria Fefilova, Anastasiia Kolisnichenko, Anton Panufnik, Elizaveta Ospischeva, Julia Lad, Olga Trehub, Anastasia Yavorskaya, Eghert Soren Nõmm, Dmitry Shchebet, Dmitry Oleynikov, Ulyana Holoviy, Sergei Avakian, Nikita Kravchenko, Yana Zaets, Vladimir Rakov.

== Season Seven ==
Top 22: Anna Levchenko, Vitaliy Novikov, Ekatherina Klishina (3), Mishel Tinjo, Alyona Anufrieva, Nazar Grabar, Ekatherina Barvinskaya, Boris Shipulin, Elena Belokon, Oleg Tatarinov, Marta Brizhan, Sergei Drugov, Yuliana Dyakiv, Sergei Osirnyi, Natalya Pechernaya, Alexander Alshanov, Nadezhda Appolonova, Dmitry Maslennikov (2), Anna Nikolenko-Bashtovaya (4), Ilya Padzina, Yana Abraimova, Daniel Sibilli (winner).

== Season Eight ==
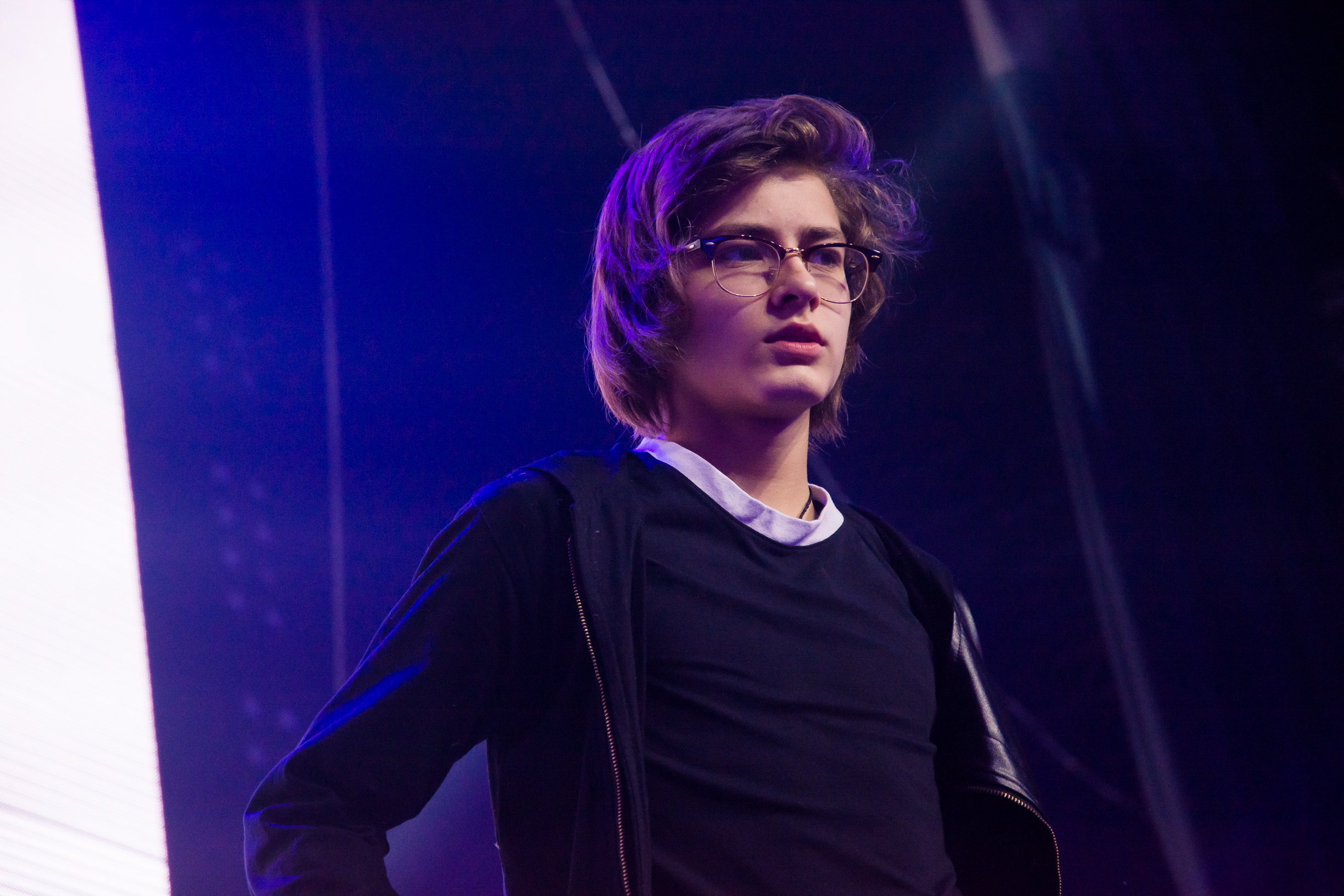
Ildar Gainutdinov, winner of season 8

Top 22: Tatyana Ogurtsova, Dmitry Pozovny, Stanislav Turmovich, Jane Sytenko, Kristina Zayats, Vladimir Galenko, Marina Mazepa, Timofey Pendik, Darya Koval, Roman Nevinchanyi, Stephaniya Mfunu, Ilya Chizhik, Tatyana Vytsup, Ildar Gainutdinov, Bahtiyar Ibragimov, Alexandra Borodina, Anna Korostelyova, Viktor Tomashek, Vladislav Hristyuha, Ilya Miroshnichenko, Elina Antonova.

== Season Nine ==
Top 16: Bogdan Urkhov, Ayhan Shinzhin, Andrey Kirillin, Ilona Fedorko, Liuba Mironets, Vlad Kurochka, Alyona Kordoban, Vasil Dipchikov, Vlad Litvinenko, Nikita Mitrofanov, Eva Uvarova, Emily Moskalenko, Michelle Nocca, Mihai Ungureanu, Kai Lin, Ekatherina Firsova.

== See also ==
- Dance on television
