= Parir te Karogh Es =

- Presented by: Grikor Aghakhanyan
- Country of origin: Armenia
- No. of seasons: 3

Production
- Running time: 1–2 hours

Original release
- Network: Shant TV
- Release: 2011

Parir te Karogh Es (Պարիր թե կարող ես in original Armenian orthography, and translated as So You Think You Can Dance) is an Armenian televised dance competition based on the original American format So You Think You Can Dance television franchise. Broadcast by Armenian television network Shant TV and hosted by Grikor Aghakhanyan, it began airing in 2011 and has been broadcast for three seasons. The first two seasons of the show had a single winner, while the third season had both a male and a female winner. The show's second-season winner, Paul Karmiriyan, subsequently entered the U.S. version of So You Think You Can Dance, and placed in the Top 6 on its tenth season.

== See also ==
- Dance on television
