= So You Think You Can Dance (Vietnamese TV series) season 4 =

So You Think You Can Dance
- Season 4
- No. of episodes: TBA

Release
- Original network: HTV7 (HCMC); H1/H2 (Hanoi); VTV Can Tho 1 (Can Tho); DRT (Danang); Yan TV (Cable); VTVcab 1 (Cable)
- Original release: 5 September 2015 – 6 January 2016

Thử Thách cùng bước nhảy: So You Think You Can Dance season 4 is the fourth season of the Vietnamese So You Think You Can Dance franchise. Chí Anh and Tuyết Minh return as judges on the show with fellow guest judge John Huy, Việt Max, Viết Thành etc. Trấn Thành hosts the show once again.

== Auditions ==
Open auditions for season two were held in Hanoi and Ho Chi Minh City

=== HCMC week ===
The Ho Chi Minh City callbacks were held in Ho Chi Minh City.

Judges
Chí Anh, John Huy, Viết Thành, Việt Max, Quỳnh Lan, Tuyết Minh
Task/style	Music	Choreographer(s)	Note(s)
Individual solo	Music chosen by contestant	The dancer	TBA eliminated / TBA through
Hip-Hop	"TBA"	TBA	TBA eliminated / TBA through
Broadway	"TBA"	TBA	TBA eliminated / TBA through
Group routines	Chosen at random from a selection of songs	The dancers	TBA eliminated / TBA through
Ballroom (Jive)	"TBA"	Phạm Đức Tiến & Nguyễn Hoàng Thảo Uyên	TBA eliminated / TBA through
Contemporary	"TBA"	TBA	TBA eliminated / TBA through
Individual solo	Music chosen by contestant	The dancer	TBA eliminated / Top 20 Finalists revealed

== Finals ==
=== Top 20 Finalists ===
==== Females ====
Finalist	Age	Home town	Dance style	Elimination date	Placement
Đỗ Hải Anh	23	HCMC	Ballet	-----------	Winner
Trần Nguyễn Trâm Anh	20	HCMC	Contemporary	December 18, 2015	Fourth Place
Nguyễn Thị Lan	27	Bắc Giang	Jazz	December 6, 2015	Top 6
Đặng Thu Hương	26	Hanoi	Ballroom	November 29, 2015	Top 8
Nguyễn Gia Linh	18	HCMC	Contemporary	November 22, 2015	Top 10
Đing Hương Ly	17	Hanoi	Contemporary	November 8, 2015	Top 12
Nguyễn Phương Anh	25	Hanoi	Bellydance	November 1, 2015	Top 14
Dương Thị Vân Ly	27	Haiphong	Jazz Funk, Hip-Hop	October 25, 2015	Top 16
Nguyễn Song Linh	18	HCMC	Contemporary	October 18, 2015	Top 18
Bùi Thị Ái Linh	26	Phú Thọ	Commercial Hip-Hop	October 11, 2015	Top 20

==== Males ====
Finalist	Age	Home town	Dance style	Elimination date	Placement
Nguyễn Hà Lộc	20	Cần Thơ	Contemporary	December 18, 2015	Runner-Up
Lê Hữu Phước	23	Quảng Nam	Breaking	December 18, 2015	Third Place
Hồng Huỳnh Gia Bảo	20	HCMC	Hip-Hop	December 6, 2015	Top 6
Đào Phi Hải	22	HCMC	Hip-Hop	November 29, 2015	Top 8
Nguyễn Đức Việt	25	Hanoi	Waacking/Jazz Funk	November 22, 2015	Top 10
Lương Hàng Trung Tín	21	HCMC	Hip-Hop	November 8, 2015	Top 12
Dương Anh Mỹ	22	Haiphong	Hip-Hop	November 1, 2015	Top 14
Vũ Minh Tân	21	HCMC	Contemporary	October 25, 2015	Top 16
Vũ Đỗ Quang Minh	24	Hanoi	Ballroom	October 18, 2015	Top 18
Phạm Minh Tuấn	25	HCMC	Ballet/Contemporary	October 11, 2015	Top 20

==== Elimination Chart ====
Legend
Female	Male	Bottom 3 couples	Bottom 4	Disqualified

Week:	11/10	18/10	25/10	01/11	08/11	15/11	22/11	29/11	06/01
Contestant	Result								
Đỗ Hải Anh	Btm 3								Winner
Nguyễn Hà Lộc			Btm 3		Btm 3	Btm 4			2nd
Lê Hữu Phước									3rd
Trần Nguyễn Trâm Anh			Btm 3			Btm 4	Btm 4		4th
Hồng Huỳnh Gia Bảo				Btm 3			Btm 4	Elim	
Nguyễn Thị Lan				Btm 3				Elim	
Đào Phi Hải		Btm 3		Btm 3			Elim		
Đặng Thu Hương			Btm 3		Btm 3		Elim		
Nguyễn Đức Việt			Btm 3		Btm 3	Elim			
Nguyễn Gia Linh		Btm 3		Btm 3	Btm 3	Elim			
Lương Hàng Trung Tín	Btm 3				Elim				
Đing Hương Ly					Elim				
Dương Anh Mỹ				Elim					
Nguyễn Phương Anh				Elim					
Vũ Minh Tân		Btm 3	Elim						
Dương Thị Vân Ly		Btm 3	Elim						
Vũ Đỗ Quang Minh	Btm 3	Elim							
Nguyễn Song Linh	Btm 3	Elim							
Phạm Minh Tuấn	Elim								
Bùi Thị Ái Linh	Elim	-							

== Syndication ==
No.	Air date	Title	Notes
01	September 5, 2015	Audition 1	
02	September 12, 2015	Audition 2	
03	September 19, 2015	Semifinal Round 1	
04	September 26, 2015	Semifinal Round 2	
05	October 3, 2015	Top 20 Showcase	
06	October 10, 2015	Top 20 Perform	
07	October 11, 2015	Top 20>18 Results Show	
08	October 17, 2015	Top 18 Performs	
09	October 18, 2015	Top 18>16 Results Show	
10	October 24, 2015	Top 16 Performs	
11	October 25, 2015	Top 16>14 Results Show	
12	October 31, 2015	Top 14 Performs	
13	November 1, 2015	Top 14>12 Results Show	
14	November 7, 2015	Top 12 Performs	
15	November 8, 2015	Top 12>10 Results Show	
16	November 14, 2015	All-Star Gala	
17	November 15, 2015	No Show	
18	November 21, 2015	Top 10 Performs	
19	November 22, 2015	Top 10>08 Results Show	
20	November 28, 2015	Top 08 Performs	
21	November 29, 2015	Top 08>06 Results Show	
22	December 5, 2015	Top 06 Performs	
23	December 6, 2015	'Top 06>04 Results Show'	
24	December 13, 2015	Top 04 Show	
25	December 14, 2015	'Journey to Be Top 4'	
26	December 21, 2015	Grand Finale	
27	December 22, 2015	Best of Season 4	
