= So You Think You Can Dance (South African TV series) =

- Presented by: Sade Giliberti
- Judges: Adele Blank; Harold Van Buuren; Didi Moses; Debbie Rakusin; David Matamela
- Country of origin: South Africa
- No. of seasons: 3

Production
- Production company: Rapid Blue

Original release
- Network: SABC 1
- Release: 7 February 2007 – 2013

Related
- So You Think You Can Dance

So You Think You Can Dance is a South African televised dance competition with a format based on the American show by the same name. Hosted by Sade Giliberti, the series premièred in 2008, and is into its third season, taking a hiatus between seasons two (2010) and three (2013). The show is presented mostly in English and the winner of the competition receives cash and prizes in the amount of around 250,000 Rand

== See also ==
- Dance on television
