= Tu gali šokti =

Lithuanian television show

- Presented by: Marijonas Mikutavičius
- Judges: Vaidotas Martinaitis; Eglė Visockaitė; Nerijus Juška
- Country of origin: Lithuania
- No. of seasons: 2
- No. of episodes: 20

Production
- Running time: 100 minutes

Original release
- Network: TV3
- Release: 11 April 2010 – 2012

Tu gali šokti ("You Can Dance") was a Lithuanian television dance competition based on the format of the international So You Think You Can Dance franchise of television shows. Broadcast on Lithuania's TV3 and hosted by Mindaugas Meskauskas, the series premiered in spring of 2010. The show was produced by Saulius Urbonavičius and aired two seasons.

== Season 1 ==
Top Seven Girls: Modesta Butautytė, Rima Kundrotienė, Alina Galičnaitė, Inga Plataunaitė, Gintare Kirklytė, Gaudre Kazlauskaite, Irina Nazarenko

Top Seven Boys: Danas Jakševičius, Tomas Uroška, Tomas Legenzova, Naglis Bierancas, Viktoras Zujevas, Laurynas Žakevičius, Karolis Paradnikas

Winner: Tomas Uroška

Runner-Up: Gaudre Kazlauskaite

== See also ==
- Dance on television

=== Similar shows ===
- The Ultimate Dance Battle
- Live to Dance/Got to Dance
- America's Best Dance Crew
- Superstars of Dance
- Dance India Dance
- Se Ela Dança, Eu Danço
