= Dance, Kazakhstan =

Blie, Qazaqstan! (Kazakh: Биле, Қазақстан!) is the Kazakh version of the popular reality TV series So You Think You Can Dance. It is shown on Khabar TV in Kazakhstan. Hosted by Aisulu Azimbayeva and Aset Arystanbekov, the Kazakh version of the popular reality series completed its inaugural of 1 season with Zhanbolat Yertayev as the champion, and 2 seasons with Aisulu Smagulbekova as the champion.
