= So You Think You Can Dance (Indian TV series) =

- Genre: Competitive dance
- Created by: Deepak Dhar
- Based on: So You Think You Can Dance
- Directed by: Bittu
- Starring: See below
- Judges: Madhuri Dixit; Bosco Martis; Terence Lewis
- Country of origin: India
- Original language: Hindi
- No. of seasons: 1
- No. of episodes: 20

Production
- Producer: Deepak Dhar
- Camera setup: Single-camera
- Running time: 45 minutes
- Production company: Endemol India

Original release
- Network: &TV
- Release: 24 April – 17 July 2016

So You Think You Can Dance is an Indian Hindi competitive dance television series, which went on air on 24 April 2016 and is broadcast on &TV. The series is produced by Deepak Dhar, then CEO of Endemol Shine India. It is aired every Saturday and Sunday night. The show is an officially licensed version of the So You Think You Can Dance franchise. The auditions of the show commenced in the second half of February 2016. The show is being hosted by Rithvik Dhanjani and Mouni Roy, with a jury of Madhuri Dixit, Terence Lewis, and Bosco Martis.

The competitors can perform dances in any of several permitted dance styles—such as Indian and Western dance forms—before a common group of judges.

== Contestants ==
=== Team Street ===
Name	Age	Current Residence
Alisha Behura	17	Bhilai
Kanchi Shah	24	Mumbai
Jueili Vaidya	23	Mumbai
Purvi Purohit	20	Gandhinagar, Gujarat.
Aryan Patra	16	Ranchi
Sahil Khan	23	Indore
Roza Rana	21	Rourkela
Prakash B.K	26	Mumbai
Tushar Shetty	20	Nalasopara
Vinay Khandelwal	26	New Delhi

=== Team Stage ===
Name	Age	Current Residence
Ryan Martyr	22	New Delhi
Sanjana Bamrara	16	Chandigarh
Sneha Singh	24	Mumbai
Rishi Sharma	24	Haryana
Tarun Nihalani	20	Nashik
Deepak	28	Haryana
Kalpita Kachroo	18	New Delhi
Rohit Behal	24	Mumbai
Krishna Mehta	19	Mumbai
Aishwarya Radhakrishnan	23	Mumbai

== Elimination Table ==
Color Keys

Winner
Runner-up
Finalist
Safe
Bottom 3
Eliminated

Contestant	Finals											
Contestant	1	2	3	4	5	6	7	8	9	10	11	12
Alisha Behura	Safe	Safe	Safe	Safe	Safe	Safe	Safe	Safe	Safe	Safe	Safe	WINNER
Aryan Patra	Safe	Safe	Safe	Safe	Safe	Safe	Safe	Safe	Safe	Safe	Safe	Runner-up
Kalpita Kachroo	Safe	Safe	Safe	Safe	Safe	Safe	Safe	Safe	Safe	Safe	FINALIST	
Tarun Nihalani	Safe	Safe	Safe	Safe	Safe	Safe	Safe	Safe	Safe	Safe	FINALIST	
Roza Rana	Safe	Safe	Safe	Safe	Safe	Safe	Safe	Safe	Safe	Elim		
Ryan Martyr	Safe	Safe	Safe	Safe	Safe	Safe	Safe	Safe	Safe	Elim		
Aishwarya Radhakrishnan	Safe	Btm 3	Safe	Safe	Safe	Safe	Safe	Safe	Elim			
Tushar Shetty	Safe	Safe	Safe	Safe	Safe	Safe	Safe	Safe	Elim			
Sneha Signh	Safe	Safe	Safe	Safe	Safe	Safe	Safe	Elim				
Kanchi Shah	Safe	Btm 3	Safe	Safe	Safe	Safe	Safe	Elim				
Prakash B.K	Safe	Safe	Safe	Safe	Safe	Elim						
Rishi Sharma	Safe	Safe	Safe	Safe	Safe	Elim						
Vinaya Khandelwal	Safe	Safe	Safe	Safe	Elim							
Rohit Behal	Safe	Safe	Safe	Safe	Elim							
Sahil Khan	Safe	Btm 3	Safe	Elim								
Deepak	Safe	Safe	Safe	Elim								
Krishna Mehta	Safe	Btm 3	Elim									
Juelli Vaidya	Safe	Safe	Elim									
Sanjana Bamrara	Safe	Elim										
Purvi Purohit	Safe	Elim										
