= So You Think You Can Dance (China) =

Chinese television series

- Genre: Interactive reality game show
- Created by: Simon Fuller; Nigel Lythgoe
- Presented by: Cheng Lei; Hua Shao
- Country of origin: China
- Original language: Mandarin Chinese
- No. of seasons: 2
- No. of episodes: 25

Production
- Running time: 90 minutes

Original release
- Network: Dragon TV (Season 1); Zhejiang STV (Season 2)
- Release: 16 February 2013 – 5 July 2014

So You Think You Can Dance China was a Chinese televised dance competition based on the format of the international So You Think You Can Dance television franchise. The first season aired on Dragon TV on 16 February 2013 with the name 舞林争霸 (Pinyin: Wǔ Lín Zhēngbà) and was hosted by Cheng Lei. Season 2 aired on Zhejiang STV on 19 April 2014 with the name 中国好舞蹈 (Pinyin: Zhōngguó Hǎo Wǔdǎo) and was hosted by Hua Shao.
