= Dans Eder misin? =

Turkish dance competition show

- Country of origin: Turkey
- No. of seasons: 6

Original release
- Network: Kanal D FOX atv Show TV
- Release: 2007 – 2011

Dans Eder misin? ("Will You Dance?"), also known as Huysuz'la Dans Eder misin? in its sixth season, is a Turkish dance competition show based on the format of American show So You Think You Can Dance. The series has aired on several different networks, including Kanal D, FOX (Turkey), ATV, and Show TV.

== See also ==
- Dance on television
