= You Can Dance (French TV series) =

- Presented by: Benjamin Castaldi
- Judges: Nico Archambault; Julie Ferrier; Kamel Ouali
- Country of origin: France
- No. of seasons: 1

Production
- Running time: 1-2 hours
- Production company: Adventure Line Productions

Original release
- Network: NT1
- Release: February 16, 2012 – present

You Can Dance is a French televised dance competition with a format based on the American show So You Think You Can Dance It airs on the NT1 television network and is hosted by Benjamin Castaldi. Premiering in early 2012, the show has aired one season. As with other shows in the international So You Think You Can Dance franchise, its competitors—young semi-professional dancers from a variety of stylistic backgrounds—compete for judge favor and at-home-viewer votes by attempting to master routines from different styles to avoid being cut as the rounds progress.

== Season 1 ==
The first season began casting and open auditions in late 2011 and premiered in February 2012. The judge's panel consisted of permanent members Nico Archambault, Julie Ferrier, and, Kamel Ouali as well as guest judges Matt Pokora, Sofia Essaidi, Fauve Hautot, and Shy'm. After the audition process, the judge's selected a Top 16 dancers to compete in the main "live show" portion of the competition.

=== Contestants ===
==== Male Contestants ====
Finalist	Age	Hometown	Dance Style	Date of Elimination	Placing
Florient	19	Le Lude	Contemporary	March 29, 2012, Week 5	WINNER
Hédi	22	Malakoff	Modern	March 22, 2012, Week 4	Top 8
Morgan	22	Le Neuveville, Switzerland	Latin	March 22, 2012, Week 4	Top 8
Thomas	25	La Plaine Saint-Denis	Hip-hop	March 29, 2012, Week 5	Top 4
Julian	29	Bordeaux	Urban	March 15, 2012, week 3	Top 12
Loïc	29	Le Blanc Mesnil	Hip-hop	March 15, 2012, week 3	Top 12
Jérémie	28	Montreuil	Tap	March 8, 2012, week 2	Top 14
Isaïes	22	Lagny	Modern Jazz	March 1, 2012, week 1	Top 16

==== Female Contestants ====
Finalist	Age	Hometown	Dance Style	Date of Elimination	Placing
Alison	24	Saint Laurent du Var	Contemporary	March 22, 2012, Week 4	Top 8
Hajiba	23	Valence	Contemporary	March 22, 2012, Week 4	Top 8
Julie	20	Paris	Modern	March 29, 2012, Week 5	Top 4
Maëlle	21	Paris	Modern Jazz	March 29, 2012, Week 5	Top 4
Audjyan	25	Courbevoie	Hip-hop	March 15, 2012, week 3	Top 12
Pryscillia	20	Draguignan	Latin	March 15, 2012, week 3	Top 12
Chéyenne	25	Beauvais	Dancehall	March 8, 2012, week 2	Top 14
Tiffany	25	Saint-Victor-sur-Loire	Modern Jazz	March 1, 2012, week 1	Top 16

== See also ==
- Dance on television
