= Kan Du Danse? =

Danish dance competition show

Kan Du Danse was Denmark's version of the dance competition show So You Think You Can Dance. The program was hosted by Thomas Mygind and Anne Katrine Skole and featured judges Niclas Bendixen, Toniah Pedersen and Kenneth Kretzman. The show lasted two seasons and was ultimately succeeded in 2008 by So You Think You Can Dance Scandinavia, a joint So You Think You Can Dance venture including contestants from Denmark, Norway, and Sweden

== Summary ==
Season	Year(s)	Winner	Runner-Up	Third	Fourth	Host(s)	Judges
1	July 20– October 5, 2005	Kendall Vaccarino	Nakita Saager	Dane Cabam	Garnet Zabik	Thomas Mygind; Anne Katrine Skole	Niclas Bendixen; Kenneth Kreutzmann; Toniah Pederson
2	Sept 14- December; 2006	Vígdis Hentze Olsen	TBA	TBA	TBA	Thomas Mygind; Anne Katrine Skole	Niclas Bendixen; Kenneth Kreutzmann; Toniah Pederson

== Season 1 (2005) ==
Male Contestants

Finalist	Age	Dance Style	Elimination Date
Adolfo Faber	22	Latin Ballroom	August 10, 2005
Isaias Xie	22	B-boying	August 31, 2005
Benito Eadie	18	Contemporary / Jazz	August 24, 2005
Jamaal Wach	30	Hip-Hop	August 3, 2005
Carmen Dacamara	21	Contemporary / Jazz	July 27, 2005
Kendall Vaccarino	21	Hip-Hop / Popping	Winner
Dane Cabam	20	Hip-Hop	3rd Place
Laurence Uc	21	Contemporary / Jazz	August 17, 2005

Female Contestants

Finalist	Age	Dance Style	Elimination Date
Ebonie Baatz	27	Hip-Hop / Jazz	August 24, 2005
Madaline Tabarez	27	Hip-Hop / Jazz	July 27, 2005
Fatima Aamodt	27	Tap	August 10, 2005
Nakita Saager	22	Contemporary / Jazz	Runner-up
Garnet Zabik	25	Latin Ballroom	4th Place
Ofelia Rabal	20	Contemporary / Jazz	August 31, 2005
Hang Yackley	22	Contemporary / Jazz	August 3, 2005
Pamella Quaas	21	Contemporary / Jazz / African	August 17, 2005

== Season 2 (2006) ==
The 2006 season began on September 14 on Kanal 5.

=== Contestants ===
Male contestants

- Alex
- Damian
- Martin Dean
- Patrick
- Stephen F
- Stephen K
- Suad

Female contestants

- Camilla
- Charlotte
- Katinka
- Kira
- Nina
- Sara

== See also ==
- So You Think You Can Dance Scandinavia
- Dance on television
