= You Can Dance (German TV series) =

- Presented by: Anna Maier
- Judges: Julie Pecquet; Kelechi Onyele; Paul Kribbe; Dirk Elwert
- Country of origin: Germany
- No. of seasons: 1

Production
- Running time: 1-2 hours

Original release
- Network: Sat.1
- Release: 2010

You Can Dance was a German televised dance competition based on the format of the international So You Think You Can Dance television franchise. Hosted by Anna Maier, the show broadcast a single season in 2006/2007, crowning ballroom dancer Dennis Jauch as champion in its finale.

== Top 14 finalists ==
- Ricarda Stürmer
- Sarah Hammerschmidt
- Marita Pohle
- Yasemin Celikkan
- Nicole Sommer
- Eva Nitsch
- Dorina Djouglarska
- Robin Grimm
- Jimmie Surles
- Camillo Lauricella
- Kim Willecke
- Christopher Jonas
- Cale Stanojevic

== Judges panel ==
- Julie Pecquet
- Kelechi Onyele
- Paul Kribbe
- Dirk Elwert

== Choreographers ==
- Marvin A. Smith
- Nina Uszkureit
- Emile Moise
- Nadine Wegner
- Marco da Silva
- Asis Khadjeh-Nouri
- Olando Amoo
- Ralf Josat

== See also ==
- Dance on television
