= So You Think You Can Dance (New Zealand TV series) =

- Directed by: Ross Peebles
- Presented by: Shane Cortese
- Judges: Michael Parmenter; Liana Hape; Harry Raiend
- Country of origin: New Zealand
- Original language: English
- No. of seasons: 2

Production
- Executive producers: Darryl McEwen; Bettina Hollings
- Producer: Mandy Toogood
- Production company: Imagination Television

Original release
- Network: TV3
- Release: 12 February – 23 April 2006

So You Think You Can Dance is a New Zealand televised dance competition based on the format of the international So You Think You Can Dance television franchise. It was hosted by Shane Cortese and broadcast on TV3 for two seasons in 2006.
