= So You Think You Can Dance: The Next Generation (Dutch TV series) =

So You Think You Can Dance: The Next Generation (abbreviated as SYTYCDNG) is a dance competition show on Dutch television RTL 5 in 2013. It was a youth spin-off version of the internationally franchised reality competition show So You Think You Can Dance. Only children participated as contestants. Unlike the adult Dutch language version of So You Think You Can Dance (which is also broadcast by the same network) this junior spin-off was not a joint Belgian-Dutch venture.

== Auditions and bootcamp ==
So You Think You Can Dance: The Next Generation started with the auditions for the candidates. At each audition, candidates were between 9 and 16 years old. During the audition, candidates performed a short dance routine to self-selected music. This routine could be performed in different formats: as a solo, a duo or a group. The judging panel decided on the spot whether the candidate had shown enough potential to advance to the next round and obtain a "Bootamp ticket".

During the bootcamp phase, spread over two days and presided over by a jury, the young dancers learned different styles. They were given guidance by several choreographers. During this phase, the number of participants was reduced to thirty.

== Studio shows and live finale ==
During this phase the show moved to a television studio, where the children vied for a spot in the live grand finale show. On June 16, 2013, Leslie won the top prize, a scholarship of €10,000, which is to be made available to him on his eighteenth birthday.

== See also ==
- So You Think You Can Dance (Belgium and the Netherlands)
