= Se Ela Dança, Eu Danço =

- Presented by: Ligia Mendes; Beto Marden
- Judges: João Wlamir; Jarbas Homem de Melo
- Original language: Portuguese
- No. of seasons: 2
- No. of episodes: 17 (in production)

Production
- Running time: 60 minutes

Original release
- Network: SBT
- Release: January 5, 2011 – January 11, 2012

Se Ela Dança, Eu Danço is a Brazilian televised dance competition show that is produced and broadcast by the Brazilian television network SBT and presented by Ligia Mendes and Beto Marden. The show takes its title from the song of the same name by MC Leozinho.

== Format ==
The competition is open to a variety of different act types, including solo, duet, and group performers of any dance style and any level of professional experience. The show recruits its performance cast from open auditions held throughout Brazil. The ten dance acts which make it past this stage will perform more elaborate routines in later episodes with a combination of at-home viewer votes and judge decisions eventually selecting one winner per season.

== Judges Panel ==
The expert judges who help select the finalists for the show and guide home voters include actor, director, dancer and choreographer João Wlamir, singer, actor, dancer and choreographer Jarbas Homem de Melo, and singer, actress, dancer,

== Season 1 ==
The premiere season began on January 5 of 2011 and drew over 10,000 auditioners to its opening auditions, which were held in Belo Horizonte, Rio de Janeiro, São Paulo, Salvador, Curitiba and Joinville (home of the Joinville Dance Festival, the world's largest annual dance event, by number of participants). From these applicants, 20 dance acts were ultimately chosen to perform in the first two semifinal rounds and, from the semi-finals, four acts progressed to a third competitive round. Lastly, the finale was a showdown between the top two acts.

== Infringement lawsuit ==
In 2011, singer MC Leozinho filed suit against the show, claiming that its title violated his intellectual property rights and that producers had not obtained permission to use the phrase or the music itself, which was initially played over the opening and closing credits. On December 21, 2011, a justice with the 15th Federal Circuit Court of Rio de Janeiro found in favor of Leozinho and imposed an injunction against the show's use of the title. However, SBT was later able to get this decision overturned and has announced plans to return with a third season of the show.
