= So You Think You Can Dance (Belgium and the Netherlands TV series) season 3 =

So You Think You Can Dance
- Season 3
- Hosted by: An Lemmens; Dennis Weening
- Judges: Dan Karaty; Euvgenia Parakhina; Jan Kooijman; Marco Gerrits
- Winner: Floris Bosveld

Release
- Original network: RTL 5 (Netherlands); Vtm (Belgium)
- Original release: August 29 – November 28, 2010

Season chronology
- ← Previous; Season 2 Next → Season 4

The third season of So You Think You Can Dance, a televised Dutch-Belgian dance competition show, based on an American show by the same name, premiered on August 29, 2010. Dan Karaty, Jan Kooijman, and Euvgenia Parakhina reprised their roles on the judging roles with newcomer Marco Gerris joining the panel as well. Dennis Weening and An Lemmens continued to co-host the program.

Hip-hop dancer Floris Bosveld was announced winner on the November 28 finale and won €25,000, a choice of dance school scholarships in the (U.S.) and a role in Dutch dance film Body Language by Johan Nijenhuis.

== Selection Process ==
=== Auditions ===
As with the second season, initial open auditions were held in Antwerp over two days, with excerpts shown as the first four episodes on the season.

=== Bootcamp ===
111 dancers were accepted beyond the first round and attended a workshop at the ArtEz complex in Arnhem. During the first day, hopefuls were separated into four groups to study four different styles (hip-hop, lyrical hip-hop, modern, and jazz) and then tested on their acquisition of the styles, with 60 competitors cut after this first round. The remaining contestants were then tested on the second day in a cha-cha round run by choreographers Roemjana de Haan and Koen Brouwers.

On the third day of the Bootcamp process, the judges announced that this season's foreign component to the process would be held in Moscow, Russia but that only 24 dancers would proceed to this point. Each judge picked one dancer to advance to this point of the process automatically and the remaining dancers were required to perform solos for one of the remaining 20 spots. Arriving in Russia, the remaining 24 dancers learned that the last Bootcamp round would feature ballet training. After observing the dancer perform a classical pas de deux from Swan Lake the judges made their final selections for the season's Top 18 dancers.

== Live Shows ==
=== Top 18 ===
==== Male Contestants ====
Finalist	Age	Residence	Style	Elimination date
Floris Bosveld	18	Groningen, Netherlands	Hip Hop	Winner
Lorenzo van Velzen Bottazzi	20	Rotterdam, Netherlands	Extremotion	Runner-Up
Stefano Giuliani	20	Dilsen-Stokkem, Belgium	Klassiek Ballet	November 21, 2010
Eldrick Gijsbertha	24	Hoogvliet, Netherlands	Hip Hop	November 14, 2010
Jahir "Chico" Suriel	23	The Hague, Netherlands	All-Round	November 7, 2010
Cagdas "Caggie" Gulum	22	Zaanstad, Netherlands	Hip Hop	October 31, 2010
Junes Lazaar	22	Vilvoorde, Belgium	Hip Hop	October 24, 2010
Jesse Wijnans	19	Breda, Netherlands	Latin	October 17, 2010
Joren Lefebvre	18	Zwevegem, Belgium	Modern	October 10, 2010

==== Female Contestants ====
Finalist	Age	Residence	Dansstijl	Elimination date
Lise Alexander	24	Lot, Belgium	Jazz-Funk/Hip Hop	3rd Place
Natascha Dejong	28	Maastricht, Netherlands	Jazz/Modern	4th Place
Enora Oplinus	18	Roeselare, Belgium	Klassiek Ballet/Modern	November 21, 2010
Hettie Leroy	22	Bilzen, Belgium	Modern	November 14, 2010
Raquel Tijsterman	24	Amsterdam, Netherlands	Ballet	November 7, 2010
Agar Dedeene Y Comez	24	Izegem, Belgium	Modern	October 31, 2010
Stéphanie Willemsen	22	Hendrik-Ido-Ambacht, Netherlands	Jazz	October 24, 2010
Evelyne De Weerdt	18	Heist-op-den-Berg, Belgium	Modern	October 17, 2010
Cheroney Pelupessy	19	Utrecht, Netherlands	Modern	October 10, 2010

==== Elimination Chart ====
Legend
Women	Man	Dance For Your Life	Bottom Dancers/Couples

Week:	10/10	17/10	24/10	31/10	7/11	14/11	21/11	28/11		
Finalist	Result									
Floris Bosveld							Btm			Winner
Lorenzo van Velzen Bottazi								Btm		RUNNER-UP
Lise Alexander			DFYL						Third	
Natascha Dejong				DFYL		Btm	Btm	Fourth		
Stefano Giuliani	DFYL			DFYL		Btm	Elim			
Enora Oplinus					Btm		Elim			
Eldrick Gijsbertha				DFYL	Btm	Elim				
Hettie Leroy					Btm	Elim				
Jahir "Chico" Suriel			DFYL		Elim					
Raquel Tijsterman	DFYL			DFYL	Elim					
Cagdas "Caggie" Gulum		DFYL	DFYL	Elim						
Agar Dedeene Y Comez		DFYL	DFYL	Elim						
Junes Lazaar	DFYL	DFYL	Elim							
Stéphanie Willemsen		DFYL	Elim							
Jesse Wijnans		Elim								
Evelyne De Weerdt	DFYL	Elim								
Joren Lefebvre	Elim									
Cheroney Pelupessy	Elim									

=== Performance ===
==== Live Show 1 (October 10, 2010) ====
Couple	Style	Music	Choreography	Result
Raquel Tijsterman; Stefano Giuliani	Pop Disco	"Boogie Wonderland"—Earth, Wind and Fire	Laurent Flament	Dance for your Life
Stéphanie Willemsen; Cagdas "Caggie" Gulum	Viennese Waltz	"Hijo de la Luna"—Mecano	Wim Gevaerts; Els Zwijsen	Safe
Cheroney Pelupessy; Junes Lazaar	Hip-hop	"The Way I Are"—Timbaland	Roberto Da Costa	Dance for your Life
Hettie Leroy; Floris Bosveld	Jazz	"Rehab"—Amy Winehouse	Laurent Flament	Safe
Lise Alexander; Jahir "Chico" Suriel	Modern	"One"—Johnny Cash	Conny Janssen	Safe
Agar Dedeene Y Comez; Jesse Wijnans	Cha Cha Cha	"Let's Get Loud"—Jennifer Lopez	Roemjana de Haan; Koen Brouwers	Safe
Natascha Dejong; Eldrick Gijsbertha	Lyrical Hip-hop	"Love the Way You Lie"—Eminem feat. Rihanna	Ish Ait Hamou	Safe
Evelyne De Weerdt; Joren Lefebvre	Broadway	"When You're Smiling"—Louis Armstrong	Cora Ringelberg	Dance for your Life
Enora Oplinus; Lorenzo van Velzen Bottazzi	Modern	"Sorry Seems to Be the Hardest Word"—Elton John	Isabelle Beernaert	Safe

Results Show 1

- Group Choreography: Top 18: "Animale"—Don Diablo feat. Dragonette (Hip-hop; Choreography: Roy Julen)
- Dance For Your Life solos:

Dancer	Style	Music	Result
Cheroney Pelupessy	Modern	"No Air"—Jordin Sparks and Chris Brown	Eliminated
Junes Lazaar	Hip Hop	"Mr Chips"—Rusko	Safe
Evelyne De Weerdt	Modern	"Most Wanted"—Department H	Safe
Joren Lefebvre	Modern	"Fighter"—Christina Aguilera	Eliminated
Raquel Tijsterman	Ballet	"Secrets"—OneRepublic	Safe
Stefano Giuliani	Klassiek ballet	"A Certain Romance"—Arctic Monkeys	Safe

- Nieuw Couple:
  - Junes Lazaar & Evelyne De Weerdt

==== Live Show 2 (October 17, 2010) ====
Couple	Style	Music	Choreography	Result
Stéphanie Willemsen; Cagdas "Caggie" Gulum	Jazz	"Stepping Stone"—Duffy	Laurent Flament	Dance for your Life
Lise Alexander; Jahir "Chico" Suriel	Pop Disco	"Daddy Cool"—Boney M.	Laurent Flament	Safe
Evelyne De Weerdt; Junes Lazaar	Foxtrot	"Theme from New York, New York"—Michael Bublé	Wim Gevaerts; Els Zwijssen	Dance for your Life
Enora Oplinus; Lorenzo van Velzen Bottazzi	Hip-hop	"DJ Got Us Fallin' in Love"—Usher feat. Pitbull	Roberto da Costa	Safe
Hettie Leroy; Floris Bosveld	Modern	"Try Sleeping with a Broken Heart"—Alicia Keys	Isabelle Beernaert	Safe
Agar Dedeene Y Comez; Jesse Wijnans	Lyrical Hip-hop	"Cry Me a River"—Justin Timberlake	Ish Ait Hamou	Dance for your Life
Raquel Tijsterman; Stefano Giuliani	Jive	"Ik leef niet meer voor jou"—Marco Borsato	Roemjana de Haan; Koen Brouwers	Safe
Natascha Dejong; Eldrick Gijsbertha	Modern	"Use Somebody"—Laura Jansen	Roy Julen	Safe

Results Show 2

- Group Choreography: Top 16: "Bad Romance"—Lady Gaga (Pop; Choreography: Cora Ringelberg)
- Dance For Your Life solos:

Dancer	Style	Music	Result
Agar Dedeene Y Comez	Modern	"Onbekend"	Safe
Jesse Wijnans	Latin	"Misery Business"—Paramore	Eliminated
Evelyne De Weerdt	Modern	"Call Me When You're Sober"—Evanescence	Eliminated
Junes Lazaar	Hip Hop	"Clubbed to Death"—Rob Dougan	Safe
Stéphanie Willemsen	Jazz	"Airplanes"—B.o.B feat. Hayley Williams	Safe
Cagdas "Caggie" Gulum	Hip Hop	"Night Time"—The XX	Safe

- Nieuw Couple:
  - Junes Lazaar & Agar Dedeene Y Comez

==== Live Show 3 (October 24, 2010) ====
Couple	Style	Music	Choreography	Result
Natascha Dejong; Eldrick Gijsbertha	Samba	"Bumpy Ride"—Mohombi	Roemjana de Haan; Koen Brouwers	Safe
Stéphanie Willemsen; Cagdas "Caggie" Gulum	Modern	"What's Up?"—4 Non Blondes	Conny Janssen	Dance for your Life
Lise Alexander; Jahir "Chico" Suriel	Quickstep	"That Man"—Caro Emerald	Wim Gevaerts; Els Zwijssen	Dance for your life
Hettie Leroy; Floris Bosveld	Hip-hop	"99 Problems"—Jay-Z	Ish Ait Hamou	Safe
Raquel Tijsterman; Stefano Giuliani	Modern	"Ne me quitte pas"—Jacques Brel	Isabelle Beernaert	Safe
Agar Dedeene Y Comez; Junes Lazaar	Jazz	"Clap Your Hands"—Sia	Laurent Flament	Dance for your Life
Enora Oplinus; Lorenzo van Velzen Bottazzi	Lyrical Hip-hop	"Wolken (FunX remix)"—Flinke Namen	Roberto Da Costa	Safe

Results Show 3

- Group Choreography: Top 14: "Storm"—Vanessa-Mae (Modern, Choreography: Ed Wubbe)
- Dance For Your Life solos:

Dancer	Style	Music	Result
Agar Dedeene Y Comez	Modern	"Onbekend"	Safe
Junes Lazaar	Hip Hop	"Windowlicker"—Aphex Twin	Eliminated
Stéphanie Willemsen	Modern	"het zwanenmeer remix"	Eliminated
Cagdas "Caggie" Gulum	Hip Hop	"Belief"—Gavin DeGraw	Safe
Lise Alexander	Jazz-Funk/Hip Hop	"Onbekend"	Safe
Jahir "Chico" Suriel	Modern	"Fever"—Peggy Lee	Safe

- Nieuw Couple:
  - Cagdas "Caggie" Gulum & Agar Dedeene Y Comez

==== Live Show 4 (October 31, 2010) ====
Couple	Style	Music	Choreography	Result
Raquel Tijsterman; Stefano Giuliani	Lyrical Hip-hop	"Unfaithful"—Rihanna	Ish Ait Hamou	Dance for your life
Enora Oplinus; Lorenzo van Velzen Bottazzi	Rumba	"Hou me vast"—Volumia!	Roemjana de Haan; Koen Brouwers	Safe
Agar Dedeene Y Comez; Cagdas "Caggie" Gulum	Hip-hop	"California Gurls"—Katy Perry feat. Snoop Dogg	Roberto Da Costa	Dance for your Life
Lise Alexander; Jahir "Chico" Suriel	Jazz	"Make You Feel My Love"—Adele	Laurent Flament	Safe
Natascha Dejong; Eldrick Gijsbertha	Modern	"Don't Speak"—No Doubt	Isabelle Beernaert	Dance for your life
Hettie Leroy; Floris Bosveld	English Waltz	"Moonlight Sonata"—Beethoven	Peter Bosveld	Safe

Results Show 4

- Group Choreography: Top 12: "Dynamite"—Taio Cruz (Hip Hop, Choreography: Roy Julen)
- Dance For Your Life solos:

Dancer	Style	Music	Result
Agar Dedeene Y Comez	Modern	"Onbekend"	Eliminated
Cagdas "Caggie" Gulum	Hip Hop	"Talking to Myself"—Eminem	Eliminated
Raquel Tijsterman	Ballet	"Made for You"—OneRepublic	Safe
Stefano Giuliani	Classical Ballet	"One"—Swedish House Mafia	Safe
Natascha Dejong	Jazz/Modern	"I Belong to You"—Kane	Safe
Eldrick Gijsbertha	Hip Hop	"Unusual"—Trey Songz feat. Drake	Safe

==== Live Show 5 (November 7, 2010) ====
Couple	Style	Music	Choreography	Result
Natascha Dejong; Floris Bosveld	Lyrical Hip-hop	"Just the Way You Are"—Bruno Mars	Vincent Vianen	Safe
Enora Oplinus; Eldrick Gijsbertha	Jazz	"Circus"—Britney Spears	Laurent Flament	Safe
Raquel Tijsterman; Jahir "Chico" Suriel	Tango	"Por Una Cabeza"—Goran Bregović & Emir Kusturica	Peter Bosveld	Beiden vallen af
Hettie Leroy; Lorenzo van Velzen Bottazzi	Hip-hop	"Sexy Bitch"—David Guetta feat. Akon	Ish Ait Hamou	Safe
Lise Alexander; Stefano Giuliani	Modern	"Geef Mij Je Angst"—Guus Meeuwis	Isabelle Beernaert	Safe

Results Show 5

- Group Choreography: Top 10: "Push Push" and "Party O'Clock"—Kat DeLuna (Hip Hop, Choreography: Roy Julen)
- Solos:

Dancer	Style	Music	Result
Natascha Dejong	Jazz/Modern	"Far Away"—Nickelback	Safe
Floris Bosveld	Hip-hop	"Until We Bleed"—Kleerup	Safe
Enora Oplinus	Classical Ballet/Modern	"It Was All In Your Mind"—Wade Robson	Safe
Eldrick Gijsbertha	Hip Hop	"Superhuman"—Chris Brown feat. Keri Hilson	Safe
Raquel Tijsterman	Ballet	"The Time Is Now"—Moloko	Eliminated
Jahir "Chico" Suriel	All-Round	"More"—Usher	Eliminated
Hettie Leroy	Modern	"I'm In Here"—Sia	Safe
Lorenzo van Velzen Bottazzi	Extremotion	"Hot Toddy"—Usher	Safe
Lise Alexander	Jazz-Funk/Hip Hop	"Monster"—Kanye West	Safe
Stefano Giuliani	Classical Ballet	"Do It Again"—The Chemical Brothers	Safe

==== Live Show 6 (November 14, 2010) ====
Couple	Style	Music	Choreography	Result
Enora Oplinus; Stefano Giuliani	Hip-hop	"Day 'n' nite"—Kid Cudi vs. Crookers	Vincent Vianen	Safe
Hettie Leroy; Eldrick Gijsbertha	Modern	"Ayo Technology"—Milow	Conny Janssen	Both eliminated
Lise Alexander; Floris Bosveld	Paso doble	"He's a Pirate"—Klaus Badelt	Roemjana de Haan; Koen Brouwers	Safe
Natascha Dejong; Lorenzo van Velzen Bottazzi	Jazz	"Mad World"—Gary Jules	Laurent Flament	Safe

Results Show 6

- Group Choreography: Top 8: "Slow Me Down"—Emmy Rossum (Hip Hop; Choreography: Roy Julen)
- Solos:

Dancer	Style	Music	Result
Enora Oplinus	Classical Ballet/Modern	"Beautiful Monster"—Ne-Yo	Safe
Stefano Giuliani	Classical Ballet	"Love is Gone"—David Guetta ft. Chris Willis	Safe
Hettie Leroy	Modern	"Bobblehead"—Christina Aguilera	Eliminated
Eldrick Gijsbertha	Hip Hop	"Won't Back Down"—Eminem ft. Pink	Eliminated
Lise Alexander	Jazz-Funk/Hip Hop	"Lux Æterna"—Clint Mansell	Safe
Floris Bosveld	Hip-hop	"Ming The Merciless"—Akira Kiteshi	Safe
Natascha Dejong	Jazz/Modern	"Check it out"—will.i.am & Nicki Minaj	Safe
Lorenzo van Velzen Bottazzi	Extremotion	"It's a Beautiful Day"—Queen	Safe

==== Live Show 7 (November 21, 2010) ====
Couple	Style	Music	Choreography	Result
Enora Oplinus; Floris Bosveld	Jazz	"Apologize"—OneRepublic	Laurent Flament	Enora eliminated
Enora Oplinus; Floris Bosveld	Lyrical Hip-hop	"Empire state of mind (Part II) Broken down"—Alicia Keys	Ish Ait Hamou	Enora eliminated
Lise Alexander; Lorenzo van Velzen Bottazzi	Hip-hop	"The Time (Dirty Bit)"—The Black Eyed Peas	Vincent Vianen	Safe
Lise Alexander; Lorenzo van Velzen Bottazzi	Slow Foxtrot	"Autumn Leaves"—Eva Cassidy	Peter Bosveld	Safe
Natascha Dejong; Stefano Giuliani	Cha-cha-cha	"Sway"—Pussycat Dolls	Roemjana de Haan; Koen Brouwers	Stefano eliminated
Natascha Dejong; Stefano Giuliani	Modern	"Yesterday"—The Beatles	Isabelle Beernaert	Stefano eliminated

Results Show 7

- Group Choreography: Top 6: (Flamenco; Choreography: Bettina Castaño)
- Eliminated
  - Enora Oplinus
  - Stefano Giuliani

==== Finale (November 28, 2010) ====
Judge Jan Koooijman, having once said that he would himself dance on the stage if the series ever garnered a million votes for a single show decided to perform instead for the finale of season 3 for the landmark of a million viewers, which occurred earlier in the season. dancing a duet with season 2 winner Smekens Els to modern choreography by Ed Wubbe. The finale also featured the announcement that series had been picked up for a fourth season.

Couple	Style	Music	Choreography
Natascha Dejong; Floris Bosveld	Quickstep	"We No Speak Americano"—Yolanda Be Cool	Peter Bosveld
Lise Alexander; Lorenzo van Velzen Bottazzi	Rumba	"Heaven"—Do	Roemjana de Haan; Koen Brouwers
Lise Alexander; Floris Bosveld	Lyrical Hip-hop	"I Hate This Part"—Pussycat Dolls	Vincent Vianen
Natascha Dejong; Lorenzo van Velzen Bottazzi	Modern	"Kissing You"—Des'ree	Isabelle Beernaert
Floris Bosveld; Lorenzo van Velzen Bottazzi	Hip-hop	"Like a G6"—Far East Movement	Roberto da Costa
Lise Alexander; Natascha Dejong	Jazz	"This Is the Last Time"—Keane	Laurent Flament

Results Show Finale

- Group Choreography: Top 18: "Ridin' Solo"—Jason Derülo (Hip-hop; Choreography: Roy Julen)
- Gastdansers: Jan Kooijman & Els Smekens: "Creep"—Radiohead (Modern, Choreography: Ed Wubbe)
- Eliminated
  - Natascha Dejong
- Solos:

Dancer	Style	Music	Result
Lise Alexander	Jazz-Funk/Hip Hop	"Whip my hair"—Willow Smith	Eliminated
Floris Bosveld	Hip-hop	"Echo"—Cyndi Lauper	Safe
Lorenzo van Velzen Bottazzi	Extremotion	"Beautiful Lies"—B-Complex	Safe

- Battle:

Dancer	Style	Music
Floris Bosveld; Lorenzo van Velzen Bottazzi	Hip-hop	"One (Your Name)"—Swedish House Mafia feat. Pharrell

- Runner-up
  - Lorenzo van Velzen Bottazzi
- Winner:
  - Floris Bosveld

== Theatre Tour ==
Date	City	Country	Theatre
January 7, 2011	Amsterdam	Netherlands	RAI Amsterdam.
January 13, 2011	The Hague	Netherlands	World Forum Theater Den Haag
January 21, 2011	Utrecht	Netherlands	Vredenburg
January 22, 2011	Utrecht	Netherlands	Vredenburg
January 26, 2011	Antwerp	Belgium	Stadsschouwburg Antwerp
January 27, 2011	Antwerp	Belgium	Stadsschouwburg Antwerp
January 28, 2011	Antwerp	Belgium	Stadsschouwburg Antwerp
January 29, 2011	Antwerp	Belgium	Stadsschouwburg Antwerp
January 30, 2011	Antwerp	Belgium	Stadsschouwburg Antwerp
