= So You Think You Can Dance (Belgium and the Netherlands TV series) season 2 =

So You Think You Can Dance
- Season 2
- Hosted by: An Lemmens; Dennis Weening
- Judges: Dan Karaty; Nicky VerNew; Jan Kooijman
- Winner: Els Smekens

Release
- Original network: RTL 5 (Netherlands); Vtm (Belgium)
- Original release: September 1 – November 29, 2009

Season chronology
- ← Previous; Season 1 Next → Season 3

The second season of So You Think You Can Dance in the Benelux aired in fall of 2009. It followed an initial production in the Netherlands in 2008, with the second season now expanding in scope to include Belgium. Dutch channel RTL4 continued to broadcast the show in the Netherlands, while Belgian station VTM was the Flemish broadcaster. With the departure of the first season's host, singer EliZe, the presentation duties for the show fell to new co-hosts An Lemmens and Dennis Weening, who have remained with the production for its subsequent three seasons. The second season premiered on September 1, 2009 and concluded eight weeks later on November 29, with Belgian Els Smekens announced winner in a live finale. Smekens won a choice of dance school opportunities in the U.S., a cash prize of €20,000, and a dance solo in the musical Hairspray.

== Judge panel ==
Unlike the first season, the second season featured a less permanent make-up for the Judge panel with Dan Karaty, Jan Kooijman and Nicky VerNew with one being occasionally replaced for a week by a guest judge.

== Auditions and Bootcamp ==
Initial open auditions were held over two days in Antwerp, with highlights broadcast as the first four episodes of the season. Of the initial auditioners, 120 were selected to progress to a group choreography round in Amsterdam. From this pool, 30 dancers were selected to participate in an intensive series of workshops known as "Bootcamp." The bootcamp for the second season was held in Los Angeles and featured choreographers Travis Payne, Timor Steffens and Kherington Payne, a former contestant on the original American series. From these competitors the judges ultimately chose the Top 18 dancers who would perform in the main competitions, or "Live Shows."

== Live Shows ==
From the Top 18 to the Top 10, the bottom three couples, based on each week's vote, would be in danger of elimination from the competition and would be required to "Dance for their lives" (perform a solo) to avoid being one of the two dancers dismissed. From the Top Ten to the finale, dancers received votes as individuals and not couples and eliminations were determined solely by home viewer votes.

=== Male Dancers ===
Finalist	age	Hometown	Dance style	Elimination date
Angelo Pardo	21	Rotterdam, Netherlands	Hip-hop, Modern	Runner-Up
Michael Iongbloed	22	Antwerp, Belgium	Ballet	3rd Place
Kris Loix	28	Hoeselt/Sint-Truiden, Belgium	Hip-hop	November 22, 2009
Remy Tilburg	20	Amsterdam, Netherlands	Hip-hop	November 15, 2009
Louis Alves	28	Rotterdam, Netherlands	Modern, Ballet	November 8, 2009
Virgil Bonofacio	20	Capelle aan den IJssel, Netherlands	Hip-hop	November 1, 2009
Bruno De Rouck	18	Gent, Belgium	Hip-hop	October 25, 2009
Samuel Chan	19	Heule, Belgium	Hip-hop	October 18, 2009
Lorenzo van Velzen Bottazzi	19	Rotterdam, Netherlands	Hip-hop	Withdrew following injury, Oct.18 2009
Pablo Sanchez Garcia	20	Breda, Netherlands	Latin	October 11, 2009

=== Female Dancers ===
Finalist	age	Woonplaats	Dans Style	Elimination datum
Els Smekens	23	Aalst, Belgium	Modern, Jazz	Winner
Evelien Ceulemans	23	Meise, Belgium	Modern, Classical ballet	4th Place
Suzanne de Bekker	20	Amsterdam, Netherlands	Modern, Jazz	November 22, 2009
Oona De Cleyn	21	Antwerp, Belgium	Modern, Classical ballet	November 15, 2009
Shiobian Dumas	24	Veghel, Netherlands	Hip-hop	November 8, 2009
Saartje Van de Casteele	22	Kortrijk, Belgium	Hip-hop	October 18, 2009/November 1, 2009
Noi Pakon Schuijffel	30	Ninove, Belgium	Modern, Jazz	October 25, 2009
Marleen Suurmeijer^{1}	23	Leeuwarden, Netherlands	Ballroom, Latin	Withdrew due to injury, Oct. 25 2009
Rubiën Vyent	20	Rotterdam, Netherlands	Hip-hop, Modern	October 11, 2009

^1 Suurmeijer replaced original Top 18 finalist Ine Vanbesien after she had to voluntarily withdrawal from the competition. Suurmeijer herself had almost made the Top 18 originally, but had to withdrawal from Bootcamp early due to an injury which was healed by the live shows, allowing her to step in for Vanbesien. Suurmeijer then suffered another injury during rehearsals for the third week of the live shows, leading to her withdrawal as well, allowing contestant Saartje Van de Casteele (eliminated in week 2) to return.

=== Elimination Chart ===
Legend
Female	Male	Dance For Your Life	Bottom Competitors |

Week:	11/10	18/10	25/10	1/11	8/11	15/11	22/11	29/11	
Finalist	Result								
Els Smekens									Winner
Angelo Pardo									Runner-Up
Michael Iongbloed	DFYL	DFYL	DFYL		Btm		Btm	Third	
Evelien Ceulemans		DFYL	DFYL	DFYL	Btm		Btm	Fourth	
Kris Loix						Btm	Elim		
Suzanne de Bekker		DFYL	DFYL			Btm	Elim		
Remy Tilburg		^{‡}		DFYL		Elim			
Oona De Cleyn				DFYL	Btm	Elim			
Louis Alves		DFYL	DFYL	DFYL	Elim				
Shiobian Dumas					Elim				
Virgil Bonofacio				Elim					
Saartje Van de Casteele	DFYL	Elim		Elim					
Bruno De Rouck	DFYL		Elim						
Noi Pakon Schuijffel	DFYL		Elim						
Marleen Suurmeijer	^{†}		Injury	^{¦}					
Samuel Chan		Elim							
Lorenzo van Velzen Bottazzi		Injury^{‡}							
Pablo Sanchez Garcia	Elim								
Rubiën Vyent	Elim								
Ine Vanbesien	Injury^{†}								

† Suurmeijer replaced original Top 18 finalist Ine Vanbesien after she had to voluntarily withdrawal from the competition. Suurmeijer herself had almost made the Top 18 originally, but had to withdrawal from Bootcamp early due to an injury which was healed by the live shows, allowing her to step in for Vanbesien.

‡ During the performance of the first week's live routine, Velzen Bottazi was injured and could not proceed further in the competition. Remy Tilburg assumed his position the following week. Lorenzo van Velzen Bottazzi deed weer mee tijdens seizoen 3.

¦ Suurmeijer suffered another injury during rehearsals for the third week of the live shows, leading to her withdrawal as well, allowing contestant Saartje Van de Casteele (eliminated in week 2) to return.

=== Live Show 1 (October 11, 2009) ===
Judge panel: Jan Kooijman, Nicky VerNew, Dan Karaty

Couple	Style	Music	Choreography	Result
Els; Angelo	Cha Cha	"Sweet Dreams"—Eurythmics	Roemjana de Haan; Koen Brouwers	Safe
Noi; Bruno	Disco	"Let’s Dance"—Donna Summer	Laurent Flament	Dance for your Life
Marleen; Virgil	Viennese Waltz	"I’m In Love Again"—Maria Mena	Euvgenia Parakhina	Safe
Suzanne; Samuel	Hip-hop	"Sexyback"—Justin Timberlake	Ish Ait Hamou	Safe
Evelien; Louis	Modern	"No One"—Alicia Keys	Isabelle Beernaert	Safe
Rubiën; Michael	Broadway	"Me and Mrs. Jones"—Michael Bublé	Cora Ringelberg	Rubiën eliminated
Saartje; Pablo	Jazz	"Release Me"—Agnes	Cora Ringelberg	Pablo eliminated
Shiobian; Kris	Lyrical hip-hop	"Miss Independent"—Ne-Yo	Vincent Vianen	Safe
Oona; Lorenzo	Modern	"Trouble"- Coldplay	Isabelle Beernaert	Safe

Results Show 1

- Group Choreography:"Fame"—Naturi Naughton (hip-Hop, choreography by Roy Julen)
- Dance for your life couples:
  - Pablo & Saartje (Pablo eliminated)
  - Bruno & Noi
  - Michael & Rubiën (Rubiën eliminated)
- Solo's:
  - Saartje: Only You - Ashanti
  - Pablo: Unknown
  - Noi: Unknown
  - Bruno: Stylin' - Lisa Shaw
  - Rubiën: "Unknown"—Red Hot Chili Peppers
  - Michael: Unknown
- New couple: Michael & Saartje

=== Live Show 2 (October 18, 2009) ===
Judge panel: Jan Kooijman, Nicky VerNew, Dan Karaty

Couple	Style	Music	Choreography	Result
Oona; Remy	Jazz	"True Colors"—Eva Cassidy	Laurent Flament	Safe
Shiobian; Kris	Modern	"Purple Rain"—Prince and The Revolution	Isabelle Beernaert	Safe
Evelien; Louis	Samba	"Mas Que Nada"—Sergio Mendes & The Black Eyed Peas	Roemjana de Haan; Koen Brouwers	Dance for your Life
Marleen; Virgil	Lyrical hip-hop	"Ordinary people"—John Legend	Vincent Vianen	Safe
Suzanne; Samuel	Broadway	"A little less conversation"—Junkie XL	Cora Ringelberg	Samuel eliminated
Saartje; Michael	Modern	"A Thousand Miles"—Vanessa Carlton	Jaakko Toivonen	Saartje eliminated
Noi; Bruno	Hip-hop	"4 Minutes"—Madonna ft. Justin Timberlake	Abdel Sarrokh	Safe
Els; Angelo	Quickstep	"Let's Face the Music and Dance"—Nat King Cole	Euvgenia Parakhina; Peter Bosveld	Safe

Results Show 2

- Group Choreography:"Smells Like Teen Spirit"—Nirvana (Broadway, choreography by Roberto de Costa and Roy Julen)
- Dance for your life couples:
  - Louis & Evelien
  - Samuel & Suzanne (Samuel eliminated)
  - Michael & Saartje (Saartje eliminated)
- Solo's:
  - Evelien: Unknown
  - Louis: Unknown
  - Suzanne: 'Say (All I need)' - OneRepublic
  - Samuel: Unknown
  - Saartje: 'Almost' - Tamia
  - Michael: 'The Face' - Ryandan
- New couple: Michael & Suzanne

=== Live Show 3 (October 25, 2009) ===
Judge panel: Jan Kooijman, Nicky VerNew, Dan Karaty

Couple	Style	Music	Choreography	Result
Suzanne; Michael	Modern	"Nothing Compares to You"—Sinéad O'Connor	Isabelle Beernaert	Dance for your Life
Noi; Bruno	Jive	"I'm Still Standing"—Elton John	Roemjana de Haan; Koen Brouwers	Both eliminated
Oona; Remy	Lyrical hip-hop	"If I Were A Boy"—Beyoncé	Ish Ait Hamou	Safe
Shiobian; Kris	Jazz	"Back to black"—Amy Winehouse	Laurent Flament	Safe
Evelien; Louis	Foxtrot	"Fly Me To The Moon"—Frank Sinatra	Euvgenia Parakhina; Peter Bosveld	Dance for your Life
Els; Angelo	Hip-hop	"Sweet Goodbyes" (Remix)—Krezip	Roberto de Costa	Safe
Saartje; Virgil	Modern	"Nobody's Wife"—Anouk	Isabelle Beernaert	Safe

Results Show 3

- Group Choreography:"Bohemian Rhapsody"—Queen (Jazz, choreography by Cora Ringelberg)
- Dance for your life couples:
  - Bruno & Noi (both eliminated)
  - Louis & Evelien
  - Michael & Suzanne
- Solo's:
  - Noi: "Sweet Dreams"—Beyoncé
  - Bruno: Unknown
  - Evelien: "Slow Me Down" - Emmy Rossum
  - Louis: Unknown
  - Suzanne: Unknown
  - Michael: "Boom Boom Pow"—The Black Eyed Peas
- New couple: None

=== Live Show 4 (November 1, 2009) ===
Judge panel: Jan Kooijman, Nicky VerNew, Roberto da Costa, Brahim Attaeb

Couple	Style	Music	Choreography	Result
Els; Angelo	Lyrical hip-hop	"Comptine d'un autre été : L'après-midi"—Yann Tiersen	Ish Ait Hamou	Safe
Saartje; Virgil	Jazz	"I'm Like A Bird"—Nelly Furtado	Laurent Flament	Both eliminated
Suzanne; Michael	Hip-hop	"Boom Boom Pow"—The Black Eyed Peas	Vincent Vianen	Safe
Oona; Remy	Rumba	"She"—Charles Aznavour	Roemjana de Haan; Koen Brouwers	Dance for your life
Evelien; Louis	Modern	"Stop" - Sam Brown	Jaakko Toivonen	Dance for your life
Shiobian; Kris	Tango	"Adios Nonino Bandoneon"—Astor Piazzolla	Euvgenia Parakhina; Peter Bosveld	Safe

Results Show 4

- Group Choreography:"Thriller"—Michael Jackson (Pop, choreography by "Unknown")
- Dance for your life couples:
  - Louis & Evelien
  - Virgil & Saartje (both eliminated)
  - Remy & Oona
- Solo's:
  - Evelien: "Imaginary"—Evanescence
  - Louis: "Harder dan ik hebben kan" - BLØF
  - Saartje: "Ring The Alarm"—Beyoncé ft. Freemasons
  - Virgil: "I Get It In"—Omarion ft. Lil' Wayne
  - Oona: "Bamboo Banga"—M.I.A.
  - Remy: "Move (If You Wanna)"—Mims
- New couple: None

=== Live Show 5 (November 8, 2009) ===
Judge panel: Jan Kooijman, Nicky VerNew, Dan Karaty and Jim Bakkum

Couple	Style	Music	Choreography	Result
Shiobian; Michael	Lyrical hip-hop	Chasing Pavements - Adele	Vincent Vianen	Shiobian eliminated
Oona; Louis	Mambo	Demasiado corazon - Willy DeVille	Roemjana de Haan	Louis eliminated
Evelien; Remy	Jazz	"Disturbia"—Rihanna	Laurent Flament	Safe
Els; Kris	Poppin'	Let's Groove - Earth, Wind and Fire	Lloyd Marengo	Safe
Suzanne; Angelo	Modern	Zeg me dat het niet zo is —Ramses Shaffy and Frank Boeijen	Isabelle Beernaert	Safe

Results Show 5

- Group Choreography:"Stuk Gescheurd"—Notre Dame de Paris (Modern, choreography by Unknown)
- Solo's:
  - Shiobian: Happy - Leona Lewis
  - Michael: I don't wanna miss a thing - Aerosmith
  - Oona: Apologize (Instrumentale versie) - OneRepublic
  - Louis: When Doves Cry - Prince
  - Evelien: The Climb - Miley Cyrus
  - Remy: Forever - Chris Brown
  - Els: Time of My Life - David Cook
  - Kris: 99 Problems - Jay-Z
  - Suzanne: Coldest Winter - Kanye West
  - Angelo: Got Money - Lil' Wayne feat. T-Pain
- Result: Shiobian and Louis eliminated

=== Live Show 6 (November 15, 2009) ===
Judge panel: Jan Kooijman, Nicky VerNew, Dan Karaty and Franscesca Vanthielen

Couple	Style	Music	Choreography	Result
Oona; Remy	Broadway	Diamonds — Moulin Rouge	Laurent Flament	Both eliminated
Suzanne; Kris	Modern	Wild Thing — The Troggs	Jaakko Toivonen	Safe
Evelien; Michael	Hip-hop	My Love Don't Cost A Thing — Jennifer Lopez	Ish Ait Hamou	Safe
Els; Angelo	English Waltz	Theme From Schindler's List — Itzhak Perlman	Euvgenia Parakhina; Peter Bosveld	Safe

Results Show 6

- Group Choreography: "Requiem For A Dream" (theme song) — Clint Mansell (Modern, choreography by Isabelle Beernaert)
- Solo's:
  - Evelien: Gravity - Sara Bareilles
  - Michael: Unknown
  - Els: Permanent - David Cook
  - Angelo: Hey Mama - Kanye West
  - Oona: Eigen compositie
  - Remy: This Is It - Michael Jackson
  - Suzanne: Unknown
  - Kris: Unknown
- Result: Oona and Remy eliminated

=== Live Show 7 (November 22, 2009) ===
Judge panel: Jan Kooijman, Nicky VerNew, Dan Karaty and Albert Verlinde

Couple	Style	Music	Choreography	Result
Els; Michael	Jazz	You’re Beautiful — James Blunt	Laurent Flament	Safe
Els; Michael	Quickstep	Sing Sing Sing — Benny Goodman & His Orchestra	Euvgenia Parakhina; Peter Bosveld	Safe
Suzanne; Kris	Lyrical hip-hop	First part from Symphony No. 5 — Ludwig van Beethoven	Vincent Vianen	Both eliminated
Suzanne; Kris	Modern	9 Crimes — Damien Rice	Isabelle Beernaert	Both eliminated
Evelien; Angelo	Hip-hop	Conqueror — Joy Enriquez	Roberto de Costa	Safe
Evelien; Angelo	Paso doble	O Fortuna from Carmina Burana — Carl Orff	Roemjana de Haan; Koen Brouwers	Safe

Results Show 7

- Group Choreography: Optreden van Pixie Lott - Boys and Girls (Pop, choreography by Roy Julen)
- Result: Suzanne and Kris eliminated

=== Finale (November 29, 2009) ===
Judge panel: Jan Kooijman, Nicky VerNew, Dan Karaty

- Group Choreography: Top 4: "Pink Panther theme remix"— Henry Mancini/Unknown (Hiphop; Choreography: Ish/Roy/Vincent)

Couple	Style	Music	Choreography
Els; Michael	Rumba	"Where do I begin (Love story)"—Shirley Bassey	Roemjana de Haan; Koen Brouwers
Evelien; Angelo	Tango	Unknown	Euvgenia Parakhina; Peter Bosveld
Evelien; Michael	Lyrical Hip-hop	"The Way You Make Me Feel"—Michael Jackson	Ish Ait Hamou
Els; Angelo	Modern	"Ben"—Michael Jackson	Isabelle Beernaert
Els; Evelien	Jazz	"Dirty Diana"—Michael Jackson	Laurent Flament
Angelo; Michael	Hip-hop	"5th symphony" / "Pro Nails"—Beethoven / Caspa ft Rasko	Vincent Vianen

- Solo's:
  - Els: Vole - Céline Dion
  - Michael: Beautiful day - U2
  - Evelien: Unknown
  - Angelo: Radius - Zion I

Results Show Finale

- Group Choreography: Top 4 cast, Hairspray: "Mooiste van de stad"—Marcel Visscher as Corny Collins (Broadway; Choreography: Martin Michel)
- Eliminated
  - Evelien Ceulemans
- Eliminated
  - Michael Iongbloed
- Battle:

Dancers	Style	Music
Els; Angelo	Jazz/Hip-hop	"They Don't Care About Us"—Michael Jackson

- Choreographed Demonstration
- Runner-up
  - Angelo Pardo
- Winner:
  - Els Smekens
