= So You Think You Can Dance (Belgium and the Netherlands TV series) season 1 =

So You Think You Can Dance
- Season 1
- Hosted by: EliZe
- Judges: Jaakko Toivonen; Euvgenia Parakhina; Dan Karaty
- Winner: Ivan Paulovich

Release
- Original network: RTL 5
- Original release: September 8 – November 11, 2008

Season chronology
- Next → Season 2

The first season of So You Think You Can Dance, a Dutch adaptation of the American show by the same name, premiered on RTL4 on September 4, 2008. Unlike following seasons of the show, the first was broadcast in the Netherlands only and features only Dutch contestants. The finale aired December 11, 2008 and concluded with latin dancer Ivan Paulovich as champion. Paulovich won a choice of free dance study opportunities in the U.S., €20,000, and a role in the musical Footloose.

== Judges ==
The first season featured permanent judges Jaakko Toivonen, Euvgenia Parakhina, and Dan Karaty. Additional guest judges included Albert Verlinde, Penny de Jager, Kim-Lian van der Meij, Wendy van Dijk, and Eszteca Noya.

== Auditions and bootcamp ==
Open auditions for the first season were held exclusively in Amsterdam. Those dancers which impressed a panel of judges were sent forward to a "bootcamp," a several-day-long series of dance workshops (held in London, England for the first season). After observing the dancers over the course of the workshops, the judges then selected a Top 18 group of finalists for the main competition phase of the show, referenced as "The live shows."

== Live shows ==
From the top 18 to the top 10, the bottom three couples, based on each week's vote, were in danger of elimination from the competition and were required to "Dance for their lives" (perform a solo) to avoid being one of the two dancers dismissed. From the top 10 to the finale, dancers received votes as individuals, and not couples, and eliminations were determined solely by home viewer votes.

=== Elimination chart ===
Legenda
| Female Contestant | Male Contestant | Dance for your Life | Bottom Dancer |

| Week: | 23/10 | 30/10 | 6/11 | 13/11 | 20/11 | 27/11 | 4/12 | 11/12 |
| Contestant | Resultaat | | | | | | | |
| Ivan Paulovich | | | DFYL | | | Btm | Btm | WINNER |
| Timor Steffens | | | | | Btm | | | Runner-Up |
| Annemiek Suijkerbuijk | | | | | | | Btm | Third |
| Julia Mitomi | DFYL | | DFYL | | | | | Fourth |
| Gianinni Semedo | | | | DFYL | | | Elim | |
| Anuschka Bozo | | DFYL | | DFYL | | Btm | Elim | |
| Bram Blankestijn | DFYL | | DFYL | | Btm | Elim | | |
| Sigourney Korper | | | DFYL | | Btm | Elim | | |
| Uri Eugenio | | DFYL | | DFYL | Elim | | | |
| Marielle Constancia | DFYL | DFYL | | DFYL | Elim | | | |
| Boris Schreurs | | DFYL | | Elim | | | | |
| Anne-May De Lijser | | | | Elim | | | | |
| Ceraldo Moreau | | | Elim | | | | | |
| Giotta Kulaleen | | | Elim | | | | | |
| Giorgio Costa | DFYL | Elim | | | | | | |
| Eline Vroon | | Elim | | | | | | |
| Alessandro Pierotti | Elim | | | | | | | |
| Dapheny Oosterwolde | Elim | | | | | | | |

== Performances ==
=== Performance show 1 (October 23, 2008) ===
Judge panel: Jaakko Toivonen, Euvgenia Parakhina, Dan Karaty, Albert Verlinde

| Couple | Style | Music | Choreographer | Result |
|---|---|---|---|---|
| Eline; Boris | Hip Hop | "Church"—T-Pain | Vincent Vianen | Safe |
| Annemiek; Timor | Rumba | "Hay Amores"—Shakira | Dmitry Chaplin | Safe |
| Marielle; Giorgio | Contemporary dance | "Everything"—Anouk | Wies Bloemen | Dance for your life |
| Dapheney; Alessandro | Viennese Waltz | "In God's Hands"—Nelly Furtado | Roemjana de Haan | Both dancers eliminated |
| Giotta; Ceraldo | Disco | "Turn The Beat Around"—Vicky Sue Robinson | Jazzy | Safe |
| Julia; Bram | Jazz | "I Kissed a Girl—Katy Perry | Roy Julen | Dance for you life |
| Anne-May; Giannini | Hip Hop Lyrical | "Moving Mountains"—Usher | Vincent Vianen | Safe |
| Sigourney; Ivan | Samba | "Skip to the Bip"—Club des Belugas | Dmitry Chaplin | Safe |
| Anuschka; Uri | Broadway | "Sing! Sing! Sing!"—Fosse (Original Broadway Cast) | Jazzy | Safe |

Results show 1

- Group Choreography:"Don't Stop the Music"—Rihanna (Jazz, choreography by Mandy Moore)
- Dance for your life couples:
  - Alessandro & Dapheny (Both dancers eliminated)
  - Giorgio & Marielle
  - Bram & Julia
- Solo's:
  - Dapheney: Onbekend
  - Alessandro: "Vivo Per Lei"—Andrea Bocelli ft. Laura Pausini
  - Marielle: "Come on Girl"—Taio Cruz ft. Luciana
  - Giorgio: "Renegades of Funk"—Rage Against the Machine
  - Julia: "Blessing Dance"—Nomak
  - Bram: "Sex, Love, &Money" - Mos Def
- New couples: None

=== Performance show 2 (October 30, 2008) ===
Judge panel: Jaakko Toivonen, Euvgenia Parakhina, Dan Karaty

| Couple | Style | Music | Choreographer | Result |
|---|---|---|---|---|
| Sigourney; Ivan | Contemporary dance | "Give it to Me"—Justin Timberlake, Nelly Furtado & Timbaland | Club Guy and Roni | Safe |
| Eline; Boris | Slow Foxtrot | "Fever"—Michael Bublé | Koen Brouwers | Eline eliminated |
| Marielle; Giorgio | Cha Cha Cha | "Oye como va"—Café Latino | Julie Fryer | Giorgio eliminated |
| Annemiek; Timor | Lyrical Hip-hop | "Super human"—Chris Brown | Shaker | Safe |
| Anne-May; Giannini | Broadway | "If You Ain't Got That Swing"—Bubbling Brown Sugar cast | Roy Julen | Safe |
| Anuschka; Uri | Hip-hop | "Set It Off"—Big Daddy Kane | John Agesilas | Dance for your life |
| Giotta; Ceraldo | Lyrical | "Back to Black"—Amy Winehouse | Club Guy and Roni | Safe |
| Julia; Bram | Jive | "Footloose"—Kenny Loggins | Roemjana de Haan | Safe |

Results show 2

- Group Choreography: mix by "It's me, Bitches"—Swizz Beatz and "Don't Touch Me"—Busta Rhymes (Hip Hop, choreography by Eszteca Noya)
- Dance for your life couples:
  - Boris & Eline (Eline eliminated)
  - Giorgio & Marielle Constancia, (Giorgio eliminated)
  - Uri & Anuschka
- Solo's:
  - Eline: "7 Days to Change Your Life"—Jamie Cullum
  - Boris: "Bamboo Banga"—M.I.A.
  - Anusckha: "Secret Place"—Danity Kane
  - Uri: "Rock Your Soul"—Elisa
  - Marielle: "Ice Box"—Omarion
  - Giorgio: "Que Se Sepa"—Roberto Roena
- New couples: Marielle and Boris

=== Performance show 3 (November 6, 2008) ===
Judge panel: Jaakko Toivonen, Euvgenia Parakhina, Dan Karaty, Penny de Jager

| Couple | Style | Music | Choreographer | Result |
|---|---|---|---|---|
| Sigourney; Ivan | Paso Doble | "Malaguena"—Brian Setzer | Roemjana de Haan; Koen Brouwers | Dance for your life |
| Anne-May; Giannini | Contemporary dance | "Fallin'"—Alicia Keys | Wies Bloemen | Safe |
| Giotta; Ceraldo | Broadway | "Ease on Down the Road"—Diana Ross & Michael Jackson | Jazzy | Both dancers eliminated |
| Marielle; Boris | Lyrical Hip-hop | "Losing My Way"—Justin Timberlake | Vincent Vianen | Safe |
| Julia; Bram | Hip-hop/Locking | "Soul with a capital S!"—Tower of Power | Eszteca Noya | Dance for your life |
| Anuschka; Uri | Jazz | "Chasing Cars"—Natasha Bedingfield | Roy Julen | Safe |
| Annemiek; Timor | Quickstep | "Fascination"—Alphabeat | Julie Fryer | Safe |

Results show 3

- Group Choreography: "Wow"—Kylie Minogue (choreography by Roy Jonathans)
- Dance for your life couples:
  - Ceraldo & Giotta (Both dancers eliminated)
  - Ivan & Sigourney
  - Bram & Julia
- Solo's:
  - Giotta: "Green Light"—Beyoncé Knowles
  - Ceraldo: "High Tide"—Pete Philly & Perquisite
  - Julia: "Free Chilly"—Lupe Fiasco (ft. Shara Gree & Gem Stone)
  - Bram: Onbekend
  - Sigourney: "Sucka for Love"—Danity Kane
  - Ivan: "Jump, Jive an' Wail "—The Brian Setzer Orchestra
- New couples: None

=== Performance show 4 (November 13, 2008) ===
Judge panel: Jaakko Toivonen, Euvgenia Parakhina, Dan Karaty, Kim-Lian van der Meij

| Couple | Style | Music | Choreographer | Result |
|---|---|---|---|---|
| Anuschka; Uri | Pop | "Toxic"—Britney Spears | Roy Jonathans | Dance for your life |
| Marielle; Boris | Tango | "El Tango de Roxanne"—Moulin Rouge | Roemjana de Haan; Koen Brouwers | Boris eliminated |
| Anne-May; Giannini | Lyrical Hip-hop | "Love in da Club"—Usher | Shaker | Anne-May eliminated |
| Annemiek; Timor | Contemporary dance | "The Time is Now"—Moloko | Roy Julen | Safe |
| Julia; Bram | English Waltz | "Natural Woman"—Carole King | Roemjana de Haan; Koen Brouwers | Safe |
| Sigourney; Ivan | Hip-hop | "Signing in the Rain Remix"—Mint Royale ft. Gene Kelly | Vincent Vianen | Safe |

Results show 4

- Group Choreography: "Kijk Naar Mij"—Fame met Kim-Lian van der Meij (Broadway, choreography by Martin Michel)
- Dance for your life couples:
  - Gianinni & Anne-May (Anne-May eliminated)
  - Uri & Anuschka
  - Boris & Marielle (Boris eliminated)
- Solo's:
  - Anne-May: "Teardrop"—Massive Attack
  - Giannini: "Hot Music"—Soho
  - Anuschka: "Imaginary"—Evanescence
  - Uri: "All You Gotta Change"—Alain Clark
  - Marielle: "Viva La Vida"—Coldplay
  - Boris: "Superman"—Robin Thicke
- New partners: From week five forward, new couples are assigned each week.

=== Performance show 5 (November 20, 2008) ===
Judge panel: Jaakko Toivonen, Euvgenia Parakhina, Eszteca Noya, Albert Verlinde

| Couple | Style | Music | Choreographer | Result |
|---|---|---|---|---|
| Annemiek; Ivan | Mambo | "Livin' La Vida Loca"—Ricky Martin | Julie Fryer | Safe |
| Marielle; Timor | Hip-hop | "When I Grow Up"—Pussycat Dolls | Lars Schuiling | Marielle eliminated |
| Julia; Giannini | Contemporary dance | "De Mooiste Verliezers"—BLØF | Roy Julen | Safe |
| Sigourney; Uri | American Smooth | "It's Oh So Quiet"—Björk | Roemjana de Haan; Koen Brouwers | Uri eliminated |
| Anuschka; Bram | Lyrical Hip-hop | "Bleeding Love"—Leona Lewis | Sponky Love | Safe |

- Solo's:
  - Annemiek: "Breakaway"—Kelly Clarkson
  - Ivan: Onbekend
  - Marielle: "Put Your Hands Where My Eyes Can See"—Busta Rhymes
  - Timor: Onbekend
  - Julia: "The Workout"—Utada Hikaru
  - Giannini: "Get Your Freak On"—Missy Elliott
  - Sigourney: "You Will Be Under My Wheels"—The Prodigy
  - Uri: "Dreaming With A Broken Heart"—John Mayer
  - Anuschka: "Angel"—Do
  - Bram: Onbekend
- Results show 5
  - Group Choreography: "Llego la Hora"—Mercado Negro (Salsa, choreography by Brian van der Kust)
  - Guest performance: Dirty Dancing Musical Cast (Mambo, Music: "Johnny's Mambo", choreography by Kate Champion)
  - Result: Marielle and Uri vallen af

=== Performance show 6 (November 27, 2008) ===
Judge panel: Jaakko Toivonen, Euvgenia Parakhina, Dan Karaty, Wendy van Dijk

| Couple | Style | Music | Choreographer | Result |
|---|---|---|---|---|
| Julia; Timor | Broadway | "Holding out for a Hero"—Bonnie Tyler | Roy Jonathans | Safe |
| Anuschka; Giannini | Rumba | "Afscheid"—Volumia! | Roemjana de Haan; Koen Brouwers | Safe |
| Sigourney; Ivan | Lyrical Hip-hop | "Mad"—Ne-Yo | Shaker | Sigourney eliminated |
| Annemiek; Bram | Contemporary dance | "Lost"—Anouk | Wies Bloemen | Bram eliminated |

- Solo's:
  - Julia: "Promises (vocal mix)"—Bump&Flex
  - Timor: "Boogaloo Anthem"—Funkmaster Ozone
  - Anuschka: "Respect Remix"—Real el Canario
  - Giannini: "I Feel Good"—James Brown
  - Sigourney: "Amazing"—Kanye West
  - Ivan: "Nike Freestyle"
  - Annemiek: "Goodbye Is The Saddest Word"—Céline Dion
  - Bram: Onbekend
- Results show 6
  - Group Choreography: "Smooth Criminal"—Michael Jackson (Hip Hop, choreography by Vincent Vianen)
  - Guest performance: Burn the Floor (Ballroom, Music: "4 Minutes"—Madonna ft. Justin Timberlake )
  - Result: Sigourney and Bram vallen af

=== Performance show 7 (December 4, 2008) ===
Judge panel: Jaakko Toivonen, Euvgenia Parakhina, Dan Karaty, Kim-Lian van der Meij

| Couple | Style | Music | Choreographer | Result |
|---|---|---|---|---|
| Julia; Ivan | Hip-hop | "Sexy Back"—Justin Timberlake | Shaker | Safe |
| Julia; Ivan | Contemporary dance | "Hometown Glory"—Adele | Michal Rynia | Safe |
| Annemiek; Giannini | Waltz | "Kiss from a Rose"—Seal | Julie Fryer | Giannini eliminated |
| Annemiek; Giannini | Jazz | "Gett Off"—Prince | Roy Jonathans | Giannini eliminated |
| Anuschka; Timor | Samba | "Get Busy"—Sean Paul | Roemjana de Haan; Koen Brouwers | Anuschka eliminated |
| Anuschka; Timor | Lyrical Hip-hop | "Rise & Fall"—Craig David ft. Sting | Roy Julen | Anuschka eliminated |

- Solo's:
  - Julia: "His Mistakes"—Usher
  - Ivan: "Kalinka"—Ivan Bodrov
  - Annemiek: "The Rose"—Bette Midler
  - Giannini: "Feels Good"—Tony! Toni! Toné!
  - Anuschka: "Brave"—Idina Menzel
  - Timor: "3 minutes"—DJ Fedde le Grand & DJ Funkerman
- Results show 7
  - Group Choreography: "Galvanize"—The Chemical Brothers (Contemporary dance, choreography by Wies Bloemen and Yada van der Hoek)
  - Result: Anuschka and Giannini vallen af

=== Performance show 8: Finale (December 11, 2008) ===
Judge panel: Jaakko Toivonen, Euvgenia Parakhina, Dan Karaty, Albert Verlinde

- Group Choreography Top 18: "Closer"—Ne-Yo (Hip Hop, choreography by Dan Karaty)

| Couple | Style | Music | Choreographer |
|---|---|---|---|
| Julia; Ivan | Jive | "Shake A Tail Feather"—Blues Brothers | Roemjana de Haan; Koen Brouwers |
| Annemiek; Timor | Tango | "Libertango"—Ástor Piazzolla | Roemjana de Haan; Koen Brouwers |
| Anniemiek; Julia | Broadway | "Austin Powers Theme Song"—Austin Powers | Roy Jonathans |
| Ivan; Timor | Hip-hop | "Remix Vincent"—Vincent Vianen | Vincent Vianen |
| Julia; Timor | Lyrical Hip-hop | "Because You Loved Me"—Céline Dion | Shaker |
| Annemiek; Ivan | Contemporary dance | "Ik Kan Je Niet Laten Gaan"—Marco Borsato ft. Trijntje Oosterhuis | Roy Julen |

- Solo's:
  - Annemiek: "I'm a Believer"—Christina Milian
  - Ivan: "From Russia With Love"—Matt Monro
  - Julia: "In The Closet"—Michael Jackson
  - Timor: "I Can Make You Shuooo...."—Fingazz
- Results show 8
  - Group Choreography Top 4: "Footloose"—Footloose Cast NL (Broadway, choreography by Martin Michel)
  - Guest performance: Jaakko Toivonen & Euvgenia Parakhina—Showdance (Music: "Hoodjump"—Soundtrack Mr. & Mrs. Smith
  - Result:
    - 4th: Julia Mitomi
    - 3rd: Annemiek Suijkerbuijk
    - Runner-Up: Timor Steffens
    - Winner: Ivan Paulovich

== See also ==
- So You Think You Can Dance(Belgium and The Netherlands)
- So You Think You Can Dance, the original franchise
