= So You Think You Can Dance (Belgium and the Netherlands TV series) season 6 =

So You Think You Can Dance
- Season 6
- Hosted by: An Lemmens; Dennis Weening
- Judges: Dan Karaty; Euvgenia Parakhina; Jan Kooijman; Ish Ait Hamou
- Winner: Danny Boom

Release
- Original network: RTL 5 (Netherlands) vtm (Belgium)
- Original release: September 1 – December 1, 2013

Season chronology
- ← Previous; Season 5

The sixth season of So You Think You Can Dance, a Belgian-Dutch televised dance competition based on the American show by the same name, aired in late 2013 and concluded on December 1 with modern dancer Danny Boom as the winner. The judge's panel for this seasons was composed, for the second year running, of Dan Karaty, Euvgenia Parakhina, Jan Kooijman and Ish Ait Hamou and the shows hosting duties fell again to Dennis Weening and An Lemmens, in their fifth consecutive year as co-presenters. For this season, the "boot camp" portion of the finalist selection process was held in Seville, Spain.

== Liveshows ==
=== Top 18 ===
==== Boys ====
Finalist	Age	Location	Dance Style	Date of Elimination
Danny Boom	21	Rotterdam, Netherlands	Modern	Winner
Giovanni Kemper	21	Schiedam, Netherlands	Jazz	4th place
Miguel Pereira Carneiro	26	Buggenhout, Belgium	Hip-hop	November 24, 2013
Joey van der Slot	21	Vlaardingen, Netherlands	Hip-hop	November 17, 2013
Redouan Hergé Link	23	Wassenaar, Netherlands	Hip-hop	November 10, 2013
Liam O'Callaghan	28	Amsterdam, Netherlands	Experimental	November 3, 2013
Johan Christensen	21	Tilburg, Netherlands	Ballet	Live show stopped after three
Ricardo Oliveira Ferreira	20	Izegem, Belgium	Jazz	October 20, 2013
Jordy Putzeys	19	Sint-Truiden, Belgium	Modern	October 13, 2013

==== Girls ====
Finalist	Age	Location	Dance Style	Date of Elimination
Anneke Ghysens	22	Rotterdam, Netherlands	Modern	Runner-up
Tamara Arruti	24	Leefdaal, Belgium	Hip-hop	3rd place
Ellen Houck	24	Waregem, Belgium	Modern	November 24, 2013
Tugba Cetinkaya	27	Genk, Belgium	Ballet	November 17, 2013
Rowan Hoppenbrouwers	22	Etten-Leur, Netherlands	Jazz	November 10, 2013
Ina Wellens	18	Korbeek-Lo, Belgium	Jazz	November 3, 2013
Kris Siek Erman	29	Amsterdam, Netherlands	Jazz	October 27, 2013
Sophie Boers	26	Amsterdam, Netherlands	Hip-hop	October 20, 2013
Sarah Hadadia	19	Maaseik, Belgium	Hip-hop	October 13, 2013

==== Elimination List ====
Legend
Women	Men	Dance For Your Life	Bottom Participants

"Week"	13/10	20/10	27/10	03 /11	10/11	17/11	25/11	01 /12		
Contestant	Results									
Danny Boom		DFYL								WINNER
Anneke Ghysens	DFYL			DFYL			Btm			RUNNER -UP
Tamara Arruti			DFYL						Third	
Giovanni Kemper				DFYL	Btm	Btm	Btm	Fourth		
Miguel Pereira Carneiro							Elim			
Ellen Houck		DFYL			Btm	Btm	Elim			
Joey van der Slot	DFYL			DFYL		Elim				
Tugba Cetinkaya						Elim				
Redouan Hergé Link			DFYL		Elim					
Rowan Hoppenbrouwers	DFYL		DFYL	DFYL	Elim					
Liam O'Callaghan		DFYL	Elim	Elim						
Ina Wellens				Elim						
Johan Christensen	DFYL		DFYL	WD						
Kris Siek Erman		DFYL	Elim							
Ricardo Oliveira Ferreira		Elim								
Sophie Boers		Elim								
Jordy Putzeys	Elim									
Sarah Hadadia	Elim									

=== Performances ===
==== Liveshow 1 (October 13, 2013) ====
- Group Choreography:Top 18: "Papaoutai" - Stromae (Hip-hop, Choreographer: Roy Julen)

Couple	Style	Music	Choreographer	Results
Tamara Arruti; Redouan Hergé Link	Hip-hop	"Dirty Talk" - Jason Derülo feat . 2 Chainz	Steeve Austin	Safe
Ina Wellens; Giovanni Kemper	Jazz	"Wrecking Ball" - Miley Cyrus	Percy Kruythoff	Safe
Kris Siek Erman; Ricardo Oliveira Ferreira	Cha-Cha	S&M - Rihanna feat . Britney Spears	Koen Brouwers; Roemjana Rooster	Safe
Tugba Cetinkaya; Miguel Pereira Carneiro	Modern	"When Love" - Guus Meeuwis	Isabelle Beernaert	Safe
Sarah Hadadia; Jordy Putzeys	Hip-hop	"Burn" - Ellie Goulding	Yves Ruth	Dance for your Life
Rowan Hoppenbrouwers; Johan Christensen	Viennese Waltz	"Breakaway" - Kelly Clarkson	Peter Bosveld; Ilse Lans	Dance for your Life
Anneke Ghysens; Joey van der Slot	Disco	"Jump" - Girls Aloud	Laurent Flament	Dance for your Life
Sophie Boers; Liam O'Callaghan	Hip-hop	"Blurred Lines" - Robin Thicke feat . T.I. and Pharrell	Vincent Vianen	Safe
Ellen Houck; Danny Boom	Jazz	"Wake Me Up" (Avicii & Aloe Blacc cover) - Beth	Laurent Flament	Safe

Result Show 1

- Dance For Your Life solos :

Dancer	Style	Music	Results
Anneke Ghysens	Modern	"Bang Bang (My Baby Shot Me Down)" - Nancy Sinatra	Safe
Joey van der Slot	Hip-hop	"No Diggity" - Blackstreet feat. Dr. Dre	Safe
Sarah Hadadia	Hip-hop	"Unknown"	Eliminated
Jordy Putzeys	Modern	"Titanium" - David Guetta feat . Sia	Eliminated
Rowan Hoppenbrouwers	Jazz	"Royal T" - Crookers	Safe
Johan Christensen	Ballet	"Numb / Encore" - Jay - z and Linkin Park	Safe

==== Liveshow 2 (October 20, 2013) ====
Couple	Style	Music	Choreographer	Results
Rowan Hoppenbrouwers; Johan Christensen	Modern	"Just Give Me a Reason" - Pink Feat . Nate Ruess	Isabelle Beernaert	Safe
Sophie Boers; Liam O'Callaghan	Samba	"Watch Out For This" - Major Lazer feat . Busy Signal, The Flexican and FS Green	Koen Brouwers; Roemjana Rooster	Dance for your Life
Tugba Cetinkaya; Miguel Pereira Carneiro	Quickstep	"Hey Pachuco!" Royal Crown Revue from "The Mask"	Peter Bosveld; Ilse Lans	Safe
Ina Wellens; Giovanni Kemper	Hip-hop	"Locked Out of Heaven" - Bruno Mars	Yves Ruth	Safe
Anneke Ghysens; Joey van der Slot	Hip-hop	"Let The Beat Rock - Boys Noize Megamix" - Black Eyed Peas feat . 50 Cent	Vincent Vianen	Safe
Tamara Arruti; Redouan Hergé Link	Modern	"Hometown Glory" - Adele	Min Hee Bervoets	Safe
Ellen Houck; Danny Boom	Hip-hop	"The Other Side" - Jason Derülo	Miraldo van Genderen	Dance for your life
Kris Siek Erman; Ricardo Oliveira Ferreira	Jazz	"Wings" - Birdy	Laurent Flament	Dance for your life

Result Show 2

- Group Choreography, Top 16: "Hopeless Wanderer" - Mumford & Sons (Modern, Choreographer:Roy Julen)
- Dance For Your Life solos:

Dancer	Style	Music	Results
Ellen Houck	Modern	"The Truth" - Marco Borsato	Safe
Sophie Boers	Hip-hop	"Gypsy Woman (She's Homeless)" - Crystal Waters	Eliminated
Kris Siek Erman	Jazz	"To Build a Home" - The Cinematic Orchestra	Safe
Danny Boom	Modern	"Adorm" - Miguel	Safe
Liam O'Callaghan	Experimental	"Unknown"	Safe
Ricardo Oliveira Ferreira	Jazz	"I'm Just A Dancer" Kazaky	Eliminated

- New Couple:
  - Liam O'Callaghan & Kris Siek Erman

==== Liveshow 3 (October 27, 2013) ====
Couple	Style	Music	Choreographer	Results
Tugba Cetinkaya; Miguel Pereira Carneiro	Hip-hop	"What Now" - Rihanna	Vincent Vianen	Safe
Ina Wellens; Giovanni Kemper	Modern	"I miss you" - Maaike Ouboter	Isabelle Beernaert	Safe
Rowan Hoppenbrouwers; Johan Christensen	Jazz	"Amalfi" - Hooverphonic	Laurent Flament	Dance for your life
Tamara Arruti; Redouan Hergé Link	Tango	"Tanguera" - Sexteto Mayor	Peter Bosveld; Ilse Lans	Dance for your life
Ellen Houck; Danny Boom	Rumba	"Kiss Me" - Jason Walker	Koen Brouwers; Roemjana Rooster	Safe
Kris Siek Erman; Liam O'Callaghan	Hip-hop	"I Need Your Love" - Calvin Harris feat . Ellie Goulding	Steeve Austin	Dance for your Life
Anneke Ghysens; Joey van der Slot	Jazz	"The Power of Love" - Gabrielle Aplin	Percy Kruythoff	Safe

Result Show 3

- Group Choreography: "Top 14 : "I Love It/All Night" - Icona Pop (Jazz, Choreographer:Roy Julen )
- Dance For Your Life solos:

Dancer	Style	Music	Results
Kris Siek Erman	Jazz	"Under My Skin" Byron Foxx	Eliminated
Rowan Hoppenbrouwers	Jazz	"Unknown"	Safe
Tamara Arruti	Hip-hop	"Murder" - Justin Timberlake feat . Jay z	Safe
Liam O'Callaghan	Experimental	"Sadness And Sorrow" (Naruto Theme)	Eliminated*
Johan Christensen	Ballet	"Oh Darling (Abbey Road)" - The Beatles	Safe*
Redouan Hergé Link	Hip-hop	"Anonanimal" - Andrew Bird	Safe

- After the announcement of the week's eliminations, with Kris Siek Erman and Liam O'Callaghan eliminated, Johan Christensen voluntarily withdrew from the competition for undisclosed personal reasons allowing O'Callaghan to continue to the next week of competition.
- New Couple:
  - Liam O'Callaghan & Rowan Hoppenbrouwers

==== Liveshow 4 (November 3, 2013) ====
Couple	Style	Music	Choreographer	Results
Tugba Cetinkaya; Miguel Pereira Carneiro	Jazz	"All of Me" - John Legend	Percy Kruythoff	Safe
Anneke Ghysens; Joey van der Slot	Jive	"What I Like About You" - Lilix	Koen Brouwers; Roemjana Rooster	Dance for your life
Ellen Houck; Danny Boom	Modern	"Formidable" - Stromae	Min Hee Bervoets	Safe
Ina Wellens; Giovanni Kemper	Slowfox	"James Bond Theme"	Peter Bosveld; Ilse Lans	Dance for your life
Tamara Arruti; Redouan Hergé Link	Hip-hop	"Scream' - Usher	Vincent Vianen	Safe
Rowan Hoppenbrouwers; Liam O'Callaghan	Hip-hop	"Wild" - Jessie J	Miraldo van Genderen	Dance for your life

Result Show 4

- Group Choreography, Top 12: "La Valse D' amelie" - Yann Tiersen (Jazz,Choreographer :Roy Julen)
- Dance For Your Life solos :

Dancer	Style	Music	Results
Ina Wellens	Jazz	"Let's Get It On" - Marvin Gaye	Eliminated
Rowan Hoppenbrouwers	Jazz	"On to the Next One" - Jay Z feat . Swizz Beatz	Safe
Anneke Ghysens	Modern	"Archangel" - Burial	Safe
Giovanni Kemper	Jazz	"Cold" Jorge Mendez	Safe
Liam O'Callaghan	Experimental	Unknown	Eliminated
Joey van der Slot	Hip-hop	"Dance Floor Champion" - Yellow Claw and Yung Felix	Safe

==== Liveshow 5 (November 10, 2013) ====
Couple	Style	Music	Choreographer
Rowan Hoppenbrouwers; Miguel Pereira Carneiro	Hip-hop	"The Monster" - Eminem ft. Rihanna	Steeve Austin
Tugba Cetinkaya; Danny Boom	Jazz	"Laura Palmer" - Bastille	Laurent Flament
Anneke Ghysens; Redouan Hergé Link	Modern	"When I Saw You" - Hero	Isabelle Beernart
Tamara Arruti; Giovanni Kemper	Jazz	"Take your time girl" - Niels Geusebroek	Percy Kruythoff
Ellen Houck; Joey van der Slot	Hip-hop	"La la la" - Naughty Boy	Yves Ruth

'Result Show 5 '

- Group Choreography, Top 10: "Turn Me On" - David Guetta feat . Nicki Minaj (Latin, Choreographers: Koen Brouwers and Roemjana Rooster )
- Solos :

Dancer	Style	Music	Results
Rowan Hoppenbrouwers	Jazz	"Fever" - Michael Bublé	Eliminated
Miguel Pereira Carneiro	Hip-hop	"Max Richter Recomposed: Summer 3" - Vivaldi	Safe
Tugba Cetinkaya	Ballet	" Unknown"	Safe
Danny Boom	Modern	"Made to Love" - John Legend	Safe
Anneke Ghysens	Modern	"Happy" - C2C	Safe
Redouan Hergé Link	Hip-hop	"Wicked Game" - James Vincent McMorrow	Eliminated
Tamara Arruti	Hip-hop	" Q.U.E.E.N ' - Janelle Monáe feat . Erykah Badu ( Vindata Remix )	Safe
Giovanni Kemper	Jazz	"Embrace" - Wudstik	Safe
Ellen Houck	Modern	"I Know Girls (Body Love)" - Mary Lambert	Safe
Joey van der Slot	Hip-hop	" Double Bubble Trouble" - M.I.A.	Safe

==== Liveshow 6 (November 17, 2013) ====
Couple	Style	Music	Choreographer
Tugba Cetinkaya; Giovanni Kemper	Cha-Cha	"When I Grow Up" - The Pussycat Dolls	Koen Brouwers; Roemjana Rooster
Ellen Houck; Miguel Pereira Carneiro	Jazz	"I Wanna Dance With Somebody" Scott Matthew	Laurent Flament
Tamara Arruti; Joey van der Slot	Modern	"Time After Time" - Eva Cassidy	Wubbe
Anneke Ghysens; Danny Boom	Hip-hop	"Can not Hold Us" - Macklemore and Ryan Lewis feat . Ray Dalton	Steeve Austin

Result Show 6

- Group Choreography, Top 8: "Holy Grail" - Justin Timberlake feat . Jay z ( Hip-hop/Modern, Choreographer: Roy Julen )
- Solos :

Dancer	Style	Music	Results
Tugba Cetinkaya	Ballet	"Venting" Etana	Eliminated
Giovanni Kemper	Jazz	" In This Shirt" - The Irrepressibles	Safe
Ellen Houck	Modern	"Come Together" - Kane	Safe
Miguel Pereira Carneiro	Hip-hop	Unknown	Safe
Tamara Arruti	Hip-hop	"Hope There's Someone" - Antony & The Johnsons	Safe
Joey van der Slot	Hip-hop	"Pop" - *NSYNC	Eliminated
Anneke Ghysens	Modern	"9 Crimes" - Damien Rice	Safe
Danny Boom	Modern	"I Could Be The One" - Beth	Safe

==== Liveshow 7 (November 24, 2013) ====
Couple	Style	Music	Choreographer	Results
Anneke Ghysens; Miguel Pereira Carneiro	Modern	"Another Love" - Tom Odell	Isabelle Beernaert	Miguel Pereira Carneiro falls off
Anneke Ghysens; Miguel Pereira Carneiro	Paso Doble	"Kashmir" - Escala feat. Slash	Koen Brouwers; Roemjana Rooster	Miguel Pereira Carneiro falls off
Ellen Houck; Giovanni Kemper	Viennese Waltz	"Lost" - Anouk	Peter Bosveld; Ilse Lans	Ellen Houck falls off
Ellen Houck; Giovanni Kemper	Modern	"How Long Will I Love You" - Ellie Goulding	Conny Janssen	Ellen Houck falls off
Tamara Arruti; Danny Boom	Broadway	"Feeling Good" - Michael Bublé	Laurent Flament	Safe
Tamara Arruti; Danny Boom	Hip-hop	"Dark Horse" - Katy Perry feat . Juicy J	Timor Steffens	Safe

'Result Show 7'

- Group Choreography, Top 6: " Crystallize" - Lindsey Stirling (Modern, Choreographer: Roy Julen)
- Eliminated :

Ellen Houck ** Miguel Pereira Carneiro **

==== Finale (December 1, 2013) ====
- Group Choreography : '"Top 18:"Just one last time ' - David Guetta feat Taped Rai ( Hip Hop'"Choreographer : Roy Julen )

Couple	Style	Music	Choreographer
Tamara Arruti; Danny Boom	Rumba	"The Destination - Marco Borsato	Koen Brouwers; Roemjana Rooster
Anneke Ghysens; Giovanni Kemper	Tango	"Primavera Portena" - Richard Galliano	Peter Bosveld; Ilse Lans
Tamara Arruti; Giovanni Kemper	Modern	"The Blower's Daughter" - Damien Rice	Isabelle Beernaert
Anneke Ghysens; Danny Boom	Modern	"Skyscraper" - Demi Lovato	Roy Julen
Giovanni Kemper; Danny Boom	Jazz	"Applause" Sam Tsui feat . Jason Pitss & Yasmeen Al- Mazeedi	Laurent Flament
Anneke Ghysens; Tamara Arruti	Hip-hop	"Run the World (Girls )" - Beyoncé	Yves Ruth

Result Show 8

- Eliminated

Giovanni Kemper **

- Solos :

Dancer	Style	Music	Results
Tamara Arruti	Hip-hop	" You Fckn Did It" - Jason Mraz	Eliminated
Danny Boom	Modern	"Not Over You" - Gavin DeGraw	Safe
Anneke Ghysens	Modern	"Fast Car" - Tracy Chapman	Safe

- Battle :

Dancers	Style	Music
Anneke Ghysens; Danny Boom	Modern	"One (Your Name)" - Swedish House Mafia feat . Pharrell

- Runner -up

Anneke Ghysens **

- Winner:

Danny Boom **
