= So You Think You Can Dance (Belgium and the Netherlands TV series) season 4 =

So You Think You Can Dance
- Season 4
- Hosted by: An Lemmens; Dennis Weening
- Judges: Dan Karaty; Euvgenia Parakhina; Jan Kooijman; Marco Gerrits
- Winner: Nina Plantefève-Castryck

Release
- Original network: RTL 5 (Netherlands) vtm (Belgium)
- Original release: August 28 – November 27, 2011

Season chronology
- ← Previous; Season 3 Next → Season 5

The fourth season of So You Think You Can Dance, the Dutch-Belgian dance competition based on the format of the American show by the same name, premiered in fall of 2011. Dan Karaty, Euvgenia Parakhina, Jan Kooijman, and Marco Gerrits all returned as judges marking the first time in the series' history that the judging panel remained unchanged. An Lemmens and Dennis Weening returned to co-host for a third season.

On November 27, classical ballet dancer Nina Plantefève-Castryck was announced winner and received €25,000, a choice of dance training opportunities in the U.S. and a solo in a David Guetta music video.

== Selection Process ==
=== Auditions ===
In season 4 open auditions were held in more than two locations (the Royal Theatre Carré in Amsterdam and the Vooruit), which was a first. Over two thousand dancers registered to take part in this phase of the competition.

=== Bootcamp ===
The first phase of the Bootcamp for the 2011 season was held in Tilburg with 100 dancers chosen from the open auditions attending. After the first day of workshops half of these dancers had been cut. Following the second day of workshops, the judges chose six dancers they felt had already earned a place in the next phase and required the remaining dancers to perform solos to earn one of the remaining 18 spots in the foreign-locale portion of the Bootcamp (held in Havana, Cuba) for season 4. On account of the location, Dan Karaty was unable to participate in the finale selection process for the Top 18 since he is American and the U.S. trade embargo on Cuba prevents him from visiting or working in the country. After several more workshop rounds, primarily centered on the Latin styles indigenous to Cuba, the remaining three judges chose the season's Top 18 dancers.

== Live Shows ==
=== Top 18 ===
==== Male Contestants ====
Finalist	Age	Residence	Dance Style	Elimination Date
Meysam Noori	22	Amsterdam, Netherlands	Hip-hop	3rd Place
Anthony Benjamin	19	Schiedam, Netherlands	Hip-hop	4th Place
Juvat Westendorp	22	Zaandam, Netherlands	Breakdance	November 20, 2011
Sedrig Verwoert	18-19	Zaandam, Netherlands	Jazz	November 13, 2011
Gianni Grot	22-23	Amsterdam, Netherlands	Hip-hop	November 6, 2011
William Kruidhof	24	Rotterdam, Netherlands	Modern	October 30, 2011
Christiaan De Donder	18	Nieuwenrode, Belgium	Modern	October 23, 2011
Michiel Van den Berghe	23	Edegem, Belgium	Jazz	October 16, 2011
Jeffrey Oehlers	26	Hoogvliet, Netherlands	Hip-hop	October 9, 2011

==== Female Contestants ====
Finalist	Age	Residence	Dance Style	Elimination Date
Nina Plantefève-Castryck	19	Kester, Belgium	Ballet	Winner
Anna-Alicia Sklias	24	Amsterdam, Netherlands	Ballet	Runner-up
Céline De Raedemaeker	26	Anderlecht, Belgium	Jazz	November 20, 2011
Stéphanie Evenepoel	21	Halle, Belgium	Jazz	November 13, 2011
Marissa Mes	19	Utrecht, Netherlands	Modern	November 6, 2011
Laura Parijs	19	Dendermonde, Belgium	Modern	October 30, 2011
Karen Brinkman	18	Leiden, Netherlands	Jazz	October 23, 2011
Rebecca Gilhooley	21	Rotterdam, Netherlands	Modern	October 16, 2011
Sandrine Balleux	22	Brussel, Belgium	Jazz	October 9, 2011

==== Elimination Chart ====
Legend
Women	Men	Dance For Your Life	Bottom Dancers

Week:	09/10	16/10	23/10	30/10	06/11	13/11	20/11	27/11		
Contestant	Result									
Nina Plantefève-Castryck										Winner
Anna-Alicia Sklias						Btm	Btm			RUNNER-UP
Meysam Noori				DFYL			Btm	Btm	Third	
Anthony Benjamin						Btm		Fourth		
Juvat Westendorp							Elim			
Céline De Raedemaeker				DFYL	Btm		Elim			
Sedrig Verwoert	DFYL	DFYL	DFYL		Btm	Elim				
Stéphanie Evenepoel				DFYL	Btm	Elim				
Gianni Grot				DFYL	Elim					
Marissa Mes		DFYL	DFYL		Elim					
William Kruidhof	DFYL		DFYL	Elim						
Laura Parijs	DFYL		DFYL	Elim						
Christiaan De Donder		DFYL	Elim							
Karen Brinkman		DFYL	Elim							
Michiel Van den Berghe		Elim								
Rebecca Gilhooley	DFYL	Elim								
Jeffrey Oehlers	Elim									
Sandrine Balleux	Elim									

=== Performance ===
==== Live Show 1 (October 9, 2011) ====
Couple	Style	Music	Choreography	Result
Laura Parijs; Jeffrey Oehlers	Hip-hop	"Titanium"—David Guetta feat. Sia	Lucinda Wessels; Caggie Gulum	Dance for your Life
Marissa Mes; Michiel Van den Berghe	Jazz	"Everything"—Michael Bublé	Percey Kruythof	Safe
Karen Brinkman; Christiaan De Donder	Modern	"Somebody That I Used To Know"—Gotye	Isabelle Beernaert	Safe
Nina Plantefève-Castryck; Anthony Benjamin	Disco	"Moves Like Jagger"—Maroon 5 feat. Christina Aguilera	Laurent Flament	Safe
Céline De Raedemaeker; Gianni Grot	Jive	"Don't Stop Me Now"—Queen	Roemjana de Haan; Koen Brouwers	Safe
Anna-Alicia Sklias; Juvat Westendorp	Tango	"Vuelvo Al Sur"—Astor Piazzolla & Roberto Grenache	Peter Bosveld; Marleen Suurmeijer	Safe
Stéphanie Evenepoel; Meysam Noori	Lyrical Hip-hop	"No Air"—Jordin Sparks and Chris Brown	Vincent Vianen	Safe
Rebecca Gilhooley; Sedrig Verwoert	Hip-hop	"Party Rock Anthem"—LMFAO	Vincent Vianen	Dance for your Life
Sandrine Balleux; William Kruidhof	Modern	"De Waarheid"—Marco Borsato	Isabelle Beernaert	Dance for your Life

Results Show 1

- Group Choreography: Top 18: "Heartbeat"—Nneka (Contemporary Hip Hop; Choreography: Roy Julen)
- Dance For Your Life solos:

Dancer	Style	Music	Result
Sandrine Balleux	Jazz	Unknown	Eliminated
William Kruidhof	Modern	Unknown	Safe
Rebecca Gilhooley	Modern	Unknown	Safe
Sedrig Verwoert	Jazz	Unknown	Safe
Laura Parijs	Modern	"Rehab"—Amy Winehouse	Safe
Jeffrey Oehlers	Hip-hop	"LTLP"—edIT	Eliminated

==== Live Show 2 (October 16, 2011) ====
Couple	Style	Music	Choreography	Result
Marissa Mes; Michiel Van den Berghe	Cha-cha-cha	"Rain Over Me"—Pitbull feat. Marc Anthony	Roemjana de Haan; Koen Brouwers	Dance for your Life
Karen Brinkman; Christiaan De Donder	Disco	"September"—Earth, Wind and Fire	Laurent Flament	Dance for your Life
Rebecca Gilhooley; Sedrig Verwoert	Modern	"Marry You"—Bruno Mars	Isabelle Beernaert	Dance for your Life
Céline De Raedemaeker; Gianni Grot	Hip-hop	"Stronger"—Kanye West	Ish Ait Hamou	Safe
Anna-Alicia Sklias; Juvat Westendorp	Modern	"The Lonely"—Christina Perri	Isabelle Beernaert	Safe
Nina Plantefève-Castryck; Anthony Benjamin	Lyrical Hip-hop	"Not Over You"—Gavin DeGraw	Vincent Vianen	Safe
Laura Parijs; William Kruidhof	Slowfox	"I've Got You Under My Skin"—Frank Sinatra	Peter Bosveld; Marleen Suurmeijer	Safe
Stéphanie Evenepoel; Meysam Noori	Jazz	"For Bitter Or Worse"—Anouk	Percey Kruythof	Safe

Results Show 2

- Group Choreography: Top 16: "Save The World"—Swedish House Mafia (Hip Hop; Choreography: Roy Julen)
- Dance For Your Life solos:

Dancer	Style	Music	Result
Karen Brinkman	Jazz	"Fix You"—Coldplay"	Safe
Christiaan De Donder	Modern	"If It Kills Me"—Jason Mraz	Safe
Rebecca Gilhooley	Modern	"Between Two Lungs"—Florence and the Machine	Eliminated
Sedrig Verwoert	Jazz	Unknown	Safe
Marissa Mes	Modern	"Sweet Dreams (Are Made of This)"—Eurythmics	Safe
Michiel Van den Berghe	Jazz	Unknown	Eliminated

==== Live Show 3 (October 23, 2011) ====
Couple	Style	Music	Choreography	Result
Marissa Mes; Sedrig Verwoert	Lyrical Hip-hop	"Lighters"—Bad Meets Evil feat. Bruno Mars	Ish Ait Hamou	Dance for your Life
Karen Brinkman; Christiaan De Donder	Viennese Waltz	"Everybody Hurts"—R.E.M.	Peter Bosveld; Marleen Suurmeijer	Dance for your Life
Nina Plantefève-Castryck; Anthony Benjamin	Modern	"Skinny Love"—Bon Iver/Birdy	Conny Janssen	Safe
Anna-Alicia Sklias; Juvat Westendorp	Hip-hop	"Got 2 Luv U"—Sean Paul feat. Alexis Jordan	Roberto Da Costa	Safe
Laura Parijs; William Kruidhof	Jazz	"Just Say Yes"—Snow Patrol	Laurent Flament	Dance for your Life
Stéphanie Evenepoel; Meysam Noori	Samba	"Whenever, Wherever"—Shakira	Roemjana de Haan; Koen Brouwers	Safe
Céline De Raedemaeker; Gianni Grot	Modern	"Always"—Glennis Grace	Isabelle Beernaert	Safe

Results Show 3

- Group Choreography: Top 14: "Without You"—David Guetta feat. Usher (Hip Hop; Choreography: Roy Julen)
- Dance For Your Life solos:

Dancer	Style	Music	Result
Marissa Mes	Modern	"For the first time"—The Script	Safe
Sedrig Verwoert	Jazz	"Hometown Glory"—Adele	Safe
Karen Brinkman	Jazz	Unknown	Eliminated
Christiaan De Donder	Modern	"Elephant in the Room"—Richard Walters	Eliminated
Laura Parijs	Jazz	"Kid Sister"—Pro Nails (Rusko Remix)	Safe
William Kruidhof	Modern	"Tears in Heaven"—Eric Clapton	Safe

==== Live Show 4 (October 30, 2011) ====
Couple	Style	Music	Choreography	Result
Nina Plantefève-Castryck; Anthony Benjamin	Hip-hop	"Just Can't Get Enough"—Black Eyed Peas	Vincent Vianen	Safe
Céline de Raedemaeker; Gianni Grot	Jazz	"Be Italian"—Fergie	Laurent Flament	Dance for your Life
Marissa Mes; Sedrig Verwoert	Quickstep	"Mr. Saxobeat"—Alexandra Stan	Peter Bosveld; Marleen Suurmeijer	Safe
Stéphanie Evenepoel; Meysam Noori	Modern	"You Are So Beautiful"—Joe Cocker	Isabelle Beernaert	Dance for your Life
Laura Parijs; William Kruidhof	Lyrical Hip-hop	"Broken Strings"—James Morrison & Nelly Furtado	Lucinda Wessels; Caggie Gulum	Dance for your Life
Anna-Alicia Sklias; Juvat Westendorp	Rumba	"Just Hold Me"—Maria Mena	Roemjana de Haan; Koen Brouwers	Safe

Results Show 4

- Group Choreography: Top 12: "Carmina Burana"—Carl Orff (Hip Hop; Choreography: Vincent Vianen)
- Dance For Your Life solos:

Dancer	Style	Music	Result
Céline de Raedemeaker	Jazz	"We Found Love"—Rihanna feat. Calvin Harris	Safe
Gianni Grot	Hip-hop	"Sure Looks Good to Me"—Alicia Keys	Safe
Laura Parijs	Modern	"Coldplay - Trouble"	Eliminated
William Kruidhof	Modern	"It's A Man's, Man's, Man's World"—James Brown	Eliminated
Stéphanie Evenepoel	Jazz	"Black And Yellow"—Wiz Khalifa	Safe
Meysam Noori	Hip-hop	"Still My Baby"-Wolfgang Gartner Feat. Omarion	Safe

==== Live Show 5 (November 6, 2011) ====
Couple	Style	Music	Choreography	Result
Céline de Raedemaeker; Juvat Westendorp	Lyrical Hip-hop	"Nothin' on you"—Bruno Mars & B.o.B	Vincent Vianen	Safe
Anna-Alicia Sklias; Sedrig Verwoert	Jazz	"Whataya Want From Me"—Adam Lambert	Percey Kruythof	Safe
Marissa Mes; Anthony Benjamin	Modern	"Voir Un Ami Pleurer"-Jacques Brel	Isabelle Beernaert	Marissa eliminated
Stéphanie Evenepoel; Gianni Grot	Hip-hop	"All of the lights"—Kanye West & Rihanna & Kid Cudi	Ish Ait Hamou	Gianni eliminated
Nina Plantefève-Castryck; Meysam Noori	English Waltz	"Adagio"—Lara Fabian-R.E.M.	Peter Bosveld; Marleen Suurmeijer	Safe

Results Show 5

- Group Choreography: Top 10: "The Alphabeat"—David Guetta (Hip-hop Choreography: Roy Julen)
- Dance For Your Life solos:

Dancer	Style	Music	Result
Céline de Raedemeaker	Jazz	"Try Sleeping with a Broken Heart"—Alicia Keys	Safe
Juvat Westendorp	Breakdance	"My Way"-Herman Brood	Safe
Anna Alicia Sklias	Classical Ballet	Metal Gear Solid 4 Theme Song-Old Snake	Safe
Sedrig Verwoert	Jazz	"To Build A Home"—The Cinematic Orchestra	Safe
Marissa Mes	Modern	”Rolling in the Deep”-Adele	Eliminated
Anthony Benjamin	Hip-hop	"Feel High"—Timeline	Safe
Stéphanie Evenepoel	Jazz	"I'll Be Waiting"—Lenny Kravitz	Safe
Gianni Grot	Hip-hop	"Als Er Nooit Meer Een Morgen Zou Zijn"—Marco Borsato	Eliminated
Nina Plantefève-Castryck	Classical Ballet	"Coming Home"—Diddy-Dirty Money feat. Skylar Grey	Safe
Meysam Noori	Hip-hop	"Cinema (Skrillex Remix)"—Benny Benassi feat. Gary Go	Safe

==== Live Show 6 (November 13, 2011) ====
Couple	Style	Music	Choreography	Result
Stéphanie Evenepoel; Sedrig Verwoert	Paso doble	"Palladio"—escala	Roemjana de Haan; Koen Brouwers	Eliminated
Anna-Alicia Sklias; Anthony Benjamin	Ballet	"The Sacrifice"—Michael Nyman	Rinus Sprong	Safe
Céline de Raedemaeker; Meysam Noori	Hip-hop	"Freestyler"—Bomfunk MC's	Vincent Vianen	Safe
Nina Plantefève-Castryck; Juvat Westendorp	Modern	"Accidental babies"—Damien Rice	Isabelle Beernaert	Safe

Results Show 6

- Group Choreography: Top 8: "Set fire to the rain" - Adele Choreography: Roy Julen
- Dance For Your Life solos:

Dancer	Style	Music	Result
Stéphanie Evenepoel	Jazz		Eliminated
Sedrig Verwoert	Jazz		Eliminated
Anna-Alicia Sklias	Modern		Safe
Anthony Benjamin	Hip-hop	"Twice"—Little Dragon	Safe
Céline de Raedemaeker	Jazz	"Crazy In Love"—Beyoncé feat. Jay-Z	Safe
Meysam Noori	Hip-hop	"In This Shirt"—The Irrepressibles	Safe
Nina Plantefève-Castryck	Classical Ballet		Safe
Juvat Westendorp	Breakdance	"Omen"—The Prodigy	Safe

==== Live Show 7 (November 20, 2011) ====
Couple	Style	Music	Choreography	Result
Nina Plantefève-Castryck; Anthony Benjamin	Hip-hop	"Where Them Girls At"—David Guetta feat. Nicki Minaj & Flo Rida	Vincent Vianen	Safe
Nina Plantefève-Castryck; Anthony Benjamin	Cha-cha-cha	"Smooth"—Santana	Roemjana de Haan; Koen Brouwers	Safe
Celine de Raedemaeker; Juvat Westendorp	Quickstep	"Hey (nah neh nah)"—Milk & Sugar vs. Vaya Con Dios	Peter Bosveld; Marleen Suurmeijer	Eliminated
Celine de Raedemaeker; Juvat Westendorp	Jazz	"The Men With The Child In His Eyes"—Lara Fabian	Laurent Flament	Eliminated
Anna-Alicia Sklias; Meysam Noori	Modern	"Video Games"—Lana Del Rey	Conny Janssen	Safe
Anna-Alicia Sklias; Meysam Noori	Lyrical Hip-hop	"I Am"—Christina Aguilera	Lucinda Wessels; Caggie Gulum	Safe

Results Show 7

- Group Choreography: Top 6: "Swagger Jagger"—Cher Lloyd (Hip Hop Choreography: Roy Julen)
- Eliminated
  - Celine de Raedemaeker
  - Juvat Westendorp

==== Finale (November 27, 2011) ====
- Group Choreography: Eliminated dancers: "Skinny Love"—Birdy (live) (Modern; Choreography: Roy Julen)

Couple	Style	Music	Choreography
Anna-Alicia Sklias; Anthony Benjamin	Lyrical Hip-hop	"Turning Tables"—Adele	Ish Ait Hamou
Nina Plantefève-Castryck; Meysam Noori	Modern	"Bird Girl"—Antony and the Johnsons	Isabelle Beernaert
Anthony Benjamin; Meysam Noori	Hip-hop	"Pump It"—Black Eyed Peas	Vincent Vianen
Nina Plantefève-Castryck; Anna-Alicia Sklias	Jazz	"A Team"—Ed Sheeran	Laurent Flament
Anna-Alicia Sklias; Meysam Noori	Rumba	"Zij gelooft in mij"—Xander de Buisonjé	Roemjana de Haan; Koen Brouwers
Nina Plantefève-Castryck; Anthony Benjamin	Argentine Tango	"Oblivion"—Lucia Micarelli	Peter Bosveld; Marleen Suurmeijer

Results Show Finale

- Group Choreography: Top 18: "Scars"—Basement Jaxx (Hip-hop; Choreography: Roy Julen)
- Eliminated
  - Anthony Benjamin
- Solos:

Dancer	Style	Music	Result
Nina Plantefève-Castryck	Ballet	"Hallelujah"—Natalia	Safe
Anna-Alicia Sklias	Ballet	"Gravity"—Sara Bareilles	Safe
Meysam Noori	Hip-hop	"Welcome To My Hood (Remix)"—DJ Kahled	Eliminated

- Battle:

Dansers	Style	Music
Nina Plantefève-Castryck; Anna-Alicia Sklias	Ballet	"One (Your Name)"—Swedish House Mafia feat. Pharrell

- Runner-up
  - Anna-Alicia Sklias
- Winner:
  - Nina Plantefève-Castryck

== Theater Tour ==
=== Tour Dates ===
Date	City	Country	Theater
January 6, 2012	Utrecht	Netherlands	Vredenburg
January 7, 2012	Utrecht	Netherlands	Vredenburg
January 8, 2012	Utrecht	Netherlands	Vredenburg
January 13, 2012	Amsterdam	Netherlands	RAI Amsterdam
January 14, 2012	Amsterdam	Netherlands	RAI Amsterdam
January 21, 2012	Groningen	Netherlands	MartiniPlaza
January 22, 2012	Groningen	Netherlands	MartiniPlaza
January 27, 2012	Kerkrade	Netherlands	Rodahal
January 28, 2012	Kerkrade	Netherlands	Rodahal
January 30, 2012	Rotterdam	Netherlands	Luxor Theater
January 31, 2012	Rotterdam	Netherlands	Luxor Theater
February 3, 2012	Antwerp	Belgium	Stadsschouwburg Antwerp
February 4, 2012	Antwerp	Belgium	Stadsschouwburg Antwerp
