= The Ultimate Dance Battle season 1 =

The Ultimate Dance Battle
- Season 1
- Hosted by: Sean D'Hondt; Lieke van Lexmond
- Judges: Dan Karaty
- Winners: Isabelle Beernaert and team

Release
- Original network: (Netherlands) RTL 5 (Belgium) 2BE
- Original release: March 27 – May 29, 2011

The first season of The Ultimate Dance Battle premiered in spring of 2011 on Dutch station RTL 5 and Belgian station 2BE. The show was hosted by Sean D'Hondt and Lieke van Lexmond. Dan Karaty also presented in-part in his role as head judge. The first season's choreographers/contestants were Laurent Flament, Isabelle Beernaert, Shaker, Rinus Sprong, and team Koen Brouwers with Fame Jana de Haan. After ten weeks of competition Beernaert was announced winner in a May 6 finale and won one-half of the €50,000 prize package, with the remainder split amongst the five dancers on her team.

== Dance Camp Rounds ==
=== Dancers ===
Dancers	Team				Style					
Dancers	1	2	3	4	All-Around	Ballet	Hip-hop	Jazz	Latin	Modern
Alessandro						✔				
Angelo							✔			
Anna-Alicia						✔				
Annemiek										✔
Chantal										✔
Charlene										✔
Cheroney										✔
Diego								✔		
Ellen										✔
Evelien										✔
Giorgio							✔			
Ivan									✔	
Jamie-Lee								✔		
Jomecia							✔			
Junior										✔
Kimberley								✔		
Lucinda							✔			
Michael						✔				
Mitchel							✔			
Patrick							✔			
Patrick										✔
Rashaen						✔				
Remy							✔			
Sinerjey							✔			
Stefano										✔
Tommy					✔					
Valerie								✔		

=== Round 1 ===
- Challenge: Choreographer's Style
- Winner: Heart2Beat and Team Rinus
- Evaluation: Dan Karaty

First Dance Camp performance show
Order	Team	Style	Music
1	Heart2Beat	Modern	"Riverside" — Agnes Obel
2	Team Koen & Roemjana	Latin/ Ballroom	"Hip Hip Chin Chin" (Yaziko Club Mix) — Club des Belugas
3	Team Rinus	Ballet	"Metamorphosis" — Philip Glass
4	Team Laurent	Jazz/Broadway	"Telephone" — Lady Gaga feat. Beyoncé
5	Team Shaker	Hip-hop	"All of the Lights" — Kanye West feat. Rihanna and Kid Cudi

- Switch: Team Rinus switched Charlene for Jomecia (of Team Shaker). Heart2Beat won a challenge as well, but its coach, Isabelle, chose not to trade any dancers.

=== Round 2 ===
- Challenge:
  - Team Rinus: Hip-hop
  - Team Shaker: Modern
  - Heart2Beat: Latin
  - Team Koen & Roemjana: Jazz
  - Team Laurent: Hip-hop
- Winner: Team Koen & Roemjana
- Evaluation: Karaty joined by Euvgenia Parakhina.

Second Dance Camp performance show
Order	Team	Style	Music
1	Team Laurent	Hip-hop	"Rocketeer" — Far East Movement
2	Team Shaker	Modern	"Drumming Song" — Florence and the Machine
3	Heart2Beat	Latin	"Rie y Llora" — Celia Cruz
4	Team Rinus	Hip-hop	"Oh my Gosh" — Usher
5	Team Koen & Roemjana	Jazz	"Sober" — P!nk

- Switch: Team Koen & Roemjana traded Patrick for Alessandro (of Team Shaker)

=== Round 3 ===
- Challenge: Win over a marketing team for chewing-gum brand.
- Winner: Team Koen & Roemjana
- Evaluation: Dan Karaty and marketing team

Third Dance Camp performance show
Order	Team	Music	Location
1	Heart2Beat	"Thunder" — Nuttin' But Stringz	Westblaak skate park
2	Team Rinus	"Yeah 3x" — Chris Brown	Ship's deck of the SS Rotterdam
3	Team Laurent	"Check it out" — Nicki Minaj feat. will.i.am	On the riverbanks near the Erasmus bridge
4	Team Koen & Roemjana	"Mourning John" (The Italian Job Soundtrack) — John Powell	In a basement
5	Team Shaker	"Genesis" — Justice	On the roof of Currents restaurant

- Switch: no dancer traded.

== Elimination Chart ==
Round:	Dance Camp			Live Shows			
Week:	Challenge 1	Challenge 2	Challenge 3	Live Show 1	Live Show 2	Live Show 3	Finale
Team	Result						
Team Heart2Beat	Won; Challenge			Safe	Safe	Safe	Winner (Live Show 4)
Team Rinus	Won; Challenge			Safe	Final; Battle	Final; Battle	Runner-Up (Live Show 4)
Team Laurent				Safe	Safe	Final Battle / Eliminated	
Team KoenRoem		Won; Challenge	Won; Challenge	Final; Battle	Final Battle / Eliminated		
Team Shaker				Final Battle / Eliminated			

== Live Shows ==
=== Live Show 1 ===
- Opening:
  - Group Choreography: "Requiem for a dream" (Soundtrack) — Clint Mansell (choreography: Roy Julen)

First Performance
Order	Team	Style	Music
1	Team Shaker	Hip-hop	"Till The World Ends" — Britney Spears
2	Team Laurent	Jazz	"Imagine" — Glee
3	Heart2Beat	Modern	"Non, je ne regrette rien" — Édith Piaf
4	Team Koen & Roemjana	Latin	"A Night Like This" — Caro Emerald
5	Team Rinus	Ballet	"Le Cygne (The Swan)" — Camille Saint-Saëns

Second Performance
Order	Team	Style	Music
1	Team Shaker	Latin	"Tonight (I'm Fuckin' You)" — Enrique Iglesias feat. Ludacris
2	Team Laurent	Modern	"Cosmic Love" — Florence and the Machine
3	Heart2Beat	Hip-hop	Coming home — Diddy – Dirty Money feat. Skylar Grey
4	Team Koen & Roemjana	Ballet	"Dare You to Move" — Vitamin String Quartet
5	Team Rinus	Jazz	"Set Fire to the Rain" — Adele

- Final Battle:
  - Team Shaker
  - Team Koen & Roemjana
    - Music: "Hello" — Martin Solveig feat. Dragonette
- Winner: Team Koen & Roemjana

=== Live Show 2 ===
- Opening:
  - Group Choreography: "Sweat" — David Guetta feat. Snoop Dogg (choreography: Roy Julen)

First Performance
Order	Team	Style	Music
1	Team Koen & Roemjana	Latin	"The Battle" (Paso Doble) — The Gladiator (Soundtrack)
2	Heart2Beat	Modern	"Wat zou je doen?" — Blof
3	Team Laurent	Jazz	"Weak" — Skunk Anansie
4	Team Rinus	Ballet	"Dance of the Sugar Plum Fairy" (The Nutcracker) — Peter Ilyich Tchaikovsky

Second Performance
Order	Team	Style	Music
1	Team Koen & Roemjana	Hip-hop	"More" — Usher
2	Heart2Beat	Ballet	"La Valse d'Amelie" (piano version) — Yann Tiersen
3	Team Laurent	Latin	"On the Floor" — Jennifer Lopez feat. Pitbull
4	Team Rinus	Modern	"I Want to Hold Your Hand" — Across The Universe (Soundtrack)

- Final Battle:
  - Team Koen & Roemjana
  - Team Rinus
    - Music: "Yeah 3x" — Chris Brown
- Winner: Team Rinus

=== Live Show 3 (semi-final) ===
- Opening:
  - Group Choreography: "Jar of Hearts" — Christina Perri (choreography: Roy Julen)

First Performance
Order	Team	Style	Music
1	Team Rinus	Hip-hop	"Who's That Chick?" — David Guetta feat. Rihanna
2	Team Laurent	Jazz	"What Do You Want from Me" (acoustic) — Adam Lambert
3	Heart2Beat	Hip-hop	"Make You Pop" — Don Diablo feat. Diplo

Second Performance
Order	Team	Style	Music
1	Team Rinus	Ballet	"Winter" — Nigel Kennedy
2	Team Laurent	Hip-hop	"Grenade" — Bruno Mars
3	Heart2Beat	Modern	"My Way" — Herman Brood

- Final Battle:
  - Team Laurent
  - Team Rinus
    - Music: "Sexy Bitch" — David Guetta feat. Akon
- Winner: Team Rinus

=== Live Show 4 (finale) ===
- Opening:
  - Group Choreography (All 5 teams): "C'mon" — Tiësto vs. Diplo feat. Busta Rhymes (choreography: Dan Karaty)

First Performance
Order	Team	Style	Music
1	Team Rinus	Hip-hop/Ballet	"Drop It to the Floor" — Pitbull
2	Heart2Beat	Modern	"Someone Like You" — Adele

Second Performances
Order	Team	Style	Music
1	Team Rinus	Tango	"Assassin’s Tango" (Soundtrack Mr. & Mrs. Smith) — John Powell
2	Heart2Beat	Jazz	"Feeling Good" — Michael Bublé

Third Performance
Order	Team	Style	Music
1	Team Rinus	Ballet	"Evgeny Kissin" — Rachmaninov
2	Heart2Beat	Hip-hop	"Run the World (Girls)" — Beyoncé

- Final Battle:
  - Team Isabelle
  - Team Rinus
    - Music: "Give me everything" — Ne-Yo feat. Pitbull
- Winner: Team Isabelle

== Viewing Figures ==
Show	Date	Ratings	Market share	Place
Episode1	March 27, 2011	560,000 viewers	7.7	#17
Episode2	April 3, 2011	538,000 viewers	7.2	#18
Episode3	April 10, 2011	434,000 viewers	6.1	#22
Episode4	April 17, 2011	599,000 viewers	8.4	#15
Episode5	April 24, 2011	388,000 viewers	7.0	#17
Episode6	May 1, 2011	512,000 viewers	7.4	#15
Live Show 1	May 8, 2011	454,000 viewers	7.4	#14
Live Show 2	May 5, 2011	564,000 viewers	8.1	#15
Live Show 3	May 22, 2011	546,000 viewers	7.9	#14
Live Show 4	May 29, 2011	557,000 viewers	8.4	#15
