= Everybody Dance Now =

Everybody Dance Now may refer to:

- Everybody Dance Now (Australian TV series), an Australian dance talent show
- Everybody Dance Now (Dutch TV series), a Dutch entertainment dance format
- "Gonna Make You Sweat (Everybody Dance Now)", a 1990 song by C+C Music Factory
- "Rock This Party (Everybody Dance Now)", a 2006 song by Bob Sinclar
- Everybody Dance Now (album), a 2009 album by Crazy Frog
