= The Ultimate Dance Battle =

Dutch and Flemish dance competition for professional level choreographers and dancers

- Created by: Dan Karaty
- Presented by: Dan Karaty; Sean D'Hondt; Lieke van Lexmond
- Judges: Dan Karaty
- Countries of origin: Netherlands and Flanders
- No. of seasons: 1
- No. of episodes: 10

Production
- Executive producers: Dan Karaty and Rudolf Polderman
- Running time: 1 - 2 hours
- Production companies: RTL Productions and Double Tap Media

Original release
- Network: RTL 5; 2BE
- Release: March 27, 2011 – 2012

The Ultimate Dance Battle (TUDB) is a Dutch and Flemish dance competition and reality show for professional level choreographers and dancers. In The Netherlands the show airs on the Dutch television network RTL 5, and in Belgium on the Flemish channel 2BE. American choreographer Dan Karaty (who has participated in various production and judging roles on other talent competitions, including So You Think You Can Dance, The X-Factor, and Holland's Got Talent) is credited as creator and executive producer of The Ultimate Dance Battle series and he also serves as its main officiator. The show is presented by Sean D'Hondt and Lieke van Lexmond. Choreographer Isabelle Beernaert and her team "Heart2Beat" won the first season of the series in spring of 2011.

== Format ==
The show diverges from standard dance competition shows in that the choreographers participating are as much contestants as the dancers. A season begins with an audition phase during which choreographers pick and vie with one another for dancers from a common talent pool in order to form teams with which they will tackle routines from different dance genres, including hip-hop, modern, ballet, ballroom, and jazz. Each week, viewer votes determine which two teams will compete in a sudden death battle and Karaty decides which team survives to compete in the next round. The winning team receives a 50,000 Euro prize package which is split between the choreographer and dancers, with half going to the former and 5,000 to each dancer in the team. The contestant status of the choreographer, the professional status of the dancers and an increased focus on behind-the-scenes drama differentiate The Ultimate Dance Battle from the other dance-themed show Karaty participates in, So You Think You Can Dance.

=== Auditions ===
Initially, hundreds of professional dancers participate in open auditions overseen by Dan Karaty and other producers who choose the best candidates to participate for the first televised auditions. These remaining dancers are then drilled in several different styles and Karaty ultimately chooses 50 to advance to the next stage, the team selection auditions. In this round, dancers are introduced by Karaty and perform solo auditions in front of all five competing professional choreographers. Any choreographer who wishes to have the dancer on their team is able to extend an invitation. If only one of the five choreographers picks a contestant they are automatically assigned to the team, but if multiple choreographers choose the same dancer, then it is that dancer's choice which team they will ultimately be placed on. If no choreographer chooses the auditioning dancer, he or she is cut from the competition, except in cases where a choreographer, or Karaty in his role as head judge, chooses to put them on “on hold” until after all dancers have auditioned, in case any teams still require additional dancers.

=== Dance Camp ===
Once every choreographer has recruited a team of exactly five dancers, the Dance Camp phase of the competition begins. Teams are housed together in a single dwelling with their choreographer and over three weeks, practice daily as they participate in three waves of challenges in different styles of choreography. After of challenge pieces, Karaty and guest judges evaluate the performances and pick two winning teams. The choreographer of a winning challenge is then offered the opportunity to switch one of their team's members with any dancer on any other team, though they are not required exercise this option. After three weeks of challenges and shake-ups, the competition enters its main phase

=== The Live Shows ===
The main competition begins as the teams, now in their final forms, begin competing with one another in earnest. Each week from here-in, each team is assigned a different style (which may or may not be their choreographer's specialty) and must put together a routine in that genre and perform it on that week's “Live Show”. At-home viewers then vote via phone for their favorite teams, with the two that pull the fewest votes being forced to participate in a dance-off against one another, with Karaty selecting the winner each week, the losing team being eliminated from competition. After 4 of these shows, the winning team is decided solely by viewer vote.

== Seasons ==
=== Overview ===
Season	Year	Winner	Runner-Up	3rd	4th	5th	Head Judge	Hosts
1	2011	Heart2Beat	Rinus Sprong	Laurent Flament	KoenRoem	Shaker	Dan Karaty	Sean D'Hondt; Lieke van Lexmond
2	2012	Vincent	Thom	Min Hee	Michel	Jaakko	Dan Karaty	Sean D'Hondt; Lieke van Lexmond
