= Michiel Borstlap =

Dutch pianist and composer

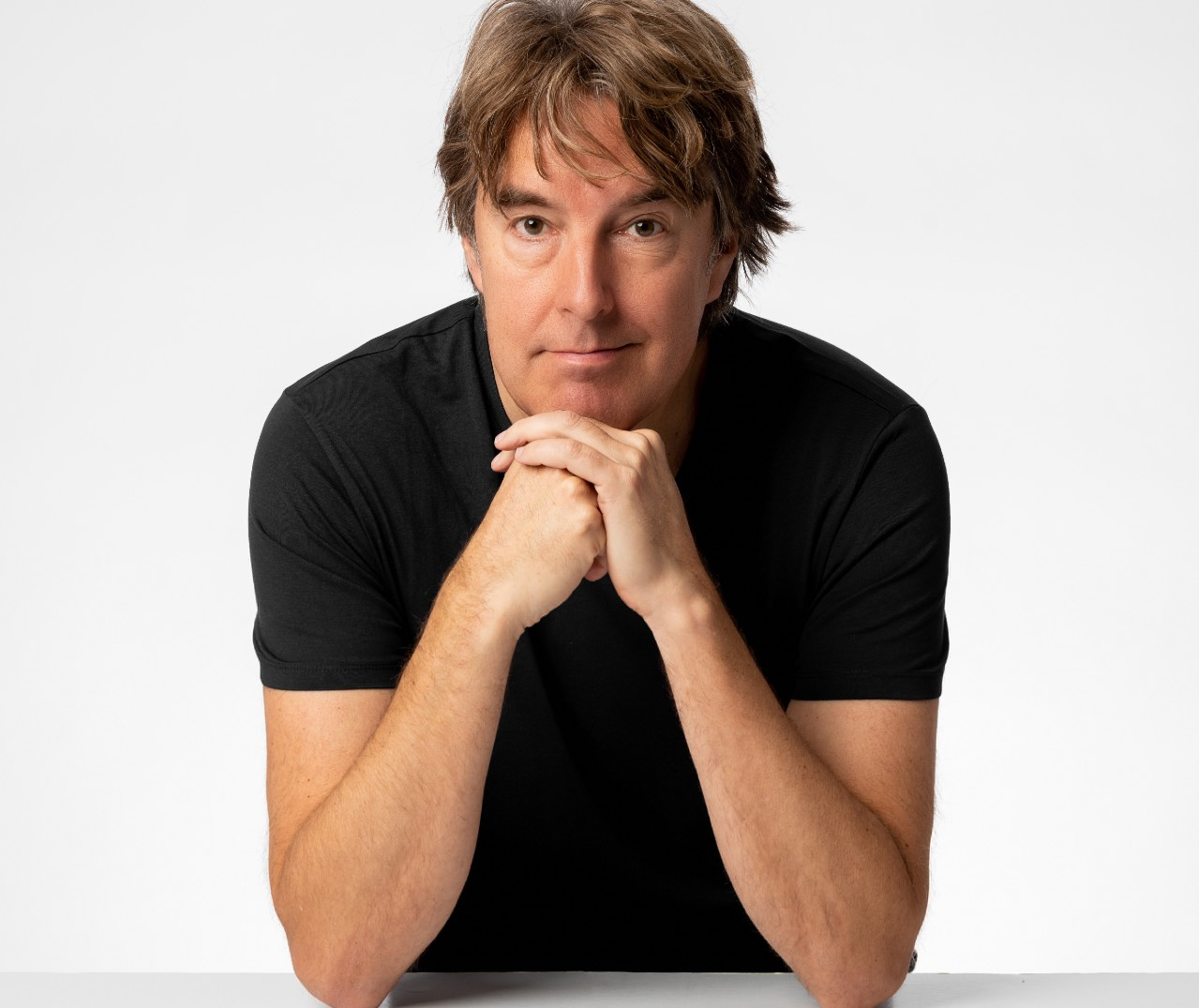

Background information
- Born: 5 August 1966 (age 59); The Hague, Netherlands
- Genres: Neo Classical & Improvised Music
- Occupation(s): Pianist & co Founder of B2B Music Network Gallery Play Media. Founder of Intono.ai
- Instrument: Piano
- Website: www.michielborstlap.com

Michiel Borstlap (born 5 August 1966) is a Dutch pianist and composer, and co Founder of B2B Music Network Gallery Play Media.

== Career ==
In 1992 Borstlap completed his studies with highest honors at the Conservatory in Hilversum, where he received piano lessons from Dutch masters like Henk Elkerbout and Rob Madna.

In 1996 he received for his composition "Memory of Enchantment", the prestigious American Thelonious Monk / BMI Composers Award. Herbie Hancock and Wayne Shorter recorded this song for their album 1+1, and it also formed an integral part of the repertoire during their various world tours. A year later, the pianist signed an exclusive recording contract with Verve.

In 2003 he was commissioned by the Emir of Qatar to compose the Arab opera Avicenna, and wrote the book 'Opera in Qatar'. Michiel wrote the book in Palermo - Sicily, Italy, where he resided for a month.

In 2007 Michiel teamed up with Canadian singer Gino Vannelli and played together in Montreal, Moscow, a series of concerts in Italy, in Sweden, and the Netherlands. Between 2004-2009 he performed extensive tours with the veteran British fusion drummer Bill Bruford, resulting in three albums and a DVD.

The solo albums he released from 2010 onwards marked a turning point in the career of the pianist. In 2010 he released SOLO 2010 and in the 2011 album Blue (Songs from Father to Daughter).

Michiel performed a selection of his works during the commemoration of Prince Friso of Orange-Nassau, at the Oude Kerk (Delft, the Netherlands).

In 2014 his album Frames was released. He toured with this album in the Netherlands, and in 2015 this album played a central role in cooperation with the Scapino Ballet Rotterdam and choreographer Ed Wubbe. This collaboration continued in 2019. In 2016 Michiel Borstlap released a live album, recorded at the Johan Cruyff ArenA. The album Arena includes both a CD and a DVD. In 2017 the album Velvet was released, an album played on his first upright piano.

Museum de Fundatie in Zwolle The Netherlands acquired his sound-sculpture 'Audire et Videre I', which is now in the permanent collection of the Museum, and can be heard in the atrium of the building.

Michiel Borstlap performed in 92 countries, on all the continents, he lives in The Netherlands and is father of Blue.

Currently Michiel Borstlap is co Founder of B2B Music Network Gallery Play Media

=== Collaborations ===
Michiel Borstlap worked ao. with Assala Nasri, Bill Bruford, Billy Cobham, George Duke, Gino Vannelli, Herbie Hancock, Holland Symfonia, Janine Jansen, Joris Voorn, Lavinia Meijer, Lawrence Renes, Les Paul, Ludovico Einaudi, Pat Metheny, Peter Erskine, Radio Filharmonisch Orkest, Wayne Shorter a.o.

=== Awards ===
- 1992 | Prize for Best Soloist Europ' Jazz Contest Belgium
- 1996 | Thelonious Monk/BMI Composers Award aka Herbie Hancock Award USA
- 2008 | Gouden Kalf Tiramisu (2008 film) Director Paula van der Oest Netherlands
- 2009 | Edison Award Bennink/Borstlap/Glerum

=== Piano Notations ===
- 2013 | Solo Piano
- 2017 | Velvet
- 2021 | The Piano Collection

== Filmography ==
- 2006-2017 | Selected TV commercials for Essent, KPN, 4/5 Mei ao.
- 2008 | Akiko (Director: Michael Sewandono)
- 2008 | Tiramisu (Director: Paula van der Oest) (Gouden Kalf - Grand Prize of Dutch Film Industry for 'Best Music')
- 2015 | Bloed, Zweet & Tranen (Director: Diederick Koopal)

== Discography ==
- Day Off (Art in Jazz, 1992)
- The Sextet Live! (Challenge, 1995)
- 3 with Han Bennink, Ernst Glerum (Via Jazz, 1997)
- White House (Via Jazz, 1997)
- Residence (Via Jazz, 1997)
- Body Acoustic (EmArcy, 1999)
- Liveline (EmArcy, 2000)
- Gramercy Park (EmArcy, 2001)
- Residence (55 Records, Japanese rerelease, 2004)
- Piano Solo/Standards (EmArcy, 2004)
- Every Step a Dance, Every Word a Song with Bill Bruford (Summerfold, 2004)
- Coffee & Jazz (GP Music, 2005)
- In Two Minds with Bill Bruford (Summerfold, 2007)
- Monk Vol. 1 with Han Bennink, Ernst Glerum (GP Music, 2008)
- Eldorado (GP Music, 2008)
- Solo 2010 (GP Music, 2010)
- Blue (GP Music, 2011)
- Reflective (GP Music, 2013)
- North Sea Jazz Legendary Concerts (Bob City, 2013)
- Frames (GP Music, 2014)
- Arena (GP Music, 2015)
- Velvet (GP Music 2017)
- Georg (GP Music, 2018)
- The Power of Music Plays Silence and Shadow Within (GP Music, 2019)
- Joris Voorn - Four (Spectrum - BMG UK 2020)
- Michiel Borstlap Plays Joris Voorn pt1. (Spectrum - BMG UK 2020)
- Mvses (Andante Piano/GP Music, 2021)
- Elements (Andante Piano/GP Music, 2021)
- Pace (Andante Piano/GP Music, June 2022)
- World Tour (Andante Piano/GP Music October 2024)
- Andante Live Sessions (Andante Piano/GP Music March 2025)
- Reimagined (Andante Piano/GP Music October 2025)
