= Introdans =

Dutch dance company

General information
- Name: Introdans
- Year founded: 1971
- Founders: Hans Focking and Ton Wiggers
- Principal venue: Arnhem, Netherlands
- Website: www.introdans.nl/en/index.asp

Senior staff
- Director: Ton Wiggers

Artistic staff
- Artistic Director: Roel Voorintholt

Introdans is a dance company based in the city of Arnhem in the Netherlands, established in 1971 by Hans Focking and Ton Wiggers. In 2009 the Ministry of Education, Culture and Science designated Introdans part of the basic national infrastructure.

== History ==
The company was founded in 1971 by Ton Wiggers, a former dancer, with a few friends who met in his living room in Arnhem. At first the small company produced classical ballet pieces choreographed by Wiggers. The company gradually became known, first touring in the Netherlands and then in 1993 making its international debut. Since then Introdans has traveled widely. For example, it was the first company to perform on the new stage of the Bolshoi Theatre in Moscow, Russia. In 2001 and 2005 it appeared on Broadway, New York, in 2006 at the Teatro Colón in Buenos Aires, Argentina, in 2008 at the National Opera in Tallinn, Estonia and in 2011 at the Shanghai Centre Theater in Shanghai, China. Princess Margriet of the Netherlands became the Company’s patroness. The company was the subject of a documentary "Recognition at Last" that was aired on Dutch TV in 2011.

== Education ==
Adriaan Luteijn is the artistic manager of Introdans Education, which runs a program called "Introdans Interactive". This involves interactive workshops that teach young people to participate creatively in dance, classes and performances of integrated and disability dance, and youth performances. In 2008 he was guest speaker at the Ukukhua Komdanso Youth Dance Festival in Durban, South Africa, and this led to a relationship with the Flatfoot Dance Company in which Introdans and Flatfoot visited each other, shared classes and workshops and put on a joint performance in Arnhem in 2010.

== Recent tours ==
Introdans returned to the United States to appear on 1 May 2012 at the Joyce Theater in New York City with a show named Heavenly. The show consisted of three very different works: the energetic Messiah with choreography by Ed Wubbe and music by George Frideric Handel; the lyrical Fünf Gedichte (five songs) by Nils Christe with music by Richard Wagner; and the chaotic but organized hip-hop Paradise? choreographed by Gisela Rocha of Brazil. The show got lukewarm reviews. One critic said of the show: "This is choreography made to slide in and out of the mind. Even never having seen it, you know all too well where it is going". Another said "The dancers are attractive and highly skilled, if also generic, and the same goes for the choreography".
