= So You Think You Can Dance (Belgium and the Netherlands TV series) =

- Presented by: EliZe (2008); An Lemmens (2009–); Dennis Weening (2009–)
- Judges: Dan Karaty; Euvgenia Parakhina; Jan Kooijman (2009–); Ish Ait Hamou (2012–); Marco Gerris (2010–2011); Nicky Vernieuwe (2009); Jaakko Toivonen (2008)
- Country of origin: Netherlands (2008–); Belgium (2009–)
- Original language: Dutch
- No. of seasons: 6

Production
- Running time: 1–2 hours

Original release
- Network: Vtm; RTL 5
- Release: 4 September 2008 – present

So You Think You Can Dance is a joint Belgian-Dutch dance competition show broadcast on RTL 5 and vtm television stations. The first season was broadcast only in the Netherlands, whereas starting with season 2, the show became a joint Belgian-Dutch production.

The show premiered on 4 September 2008 in the Netherlands and expanded to broadcasting in Flanders for its second season on 1 September 2009. Like other series in the So You Think You Can Dance franchise, the show is a talent search that uses a combination of expert judge decisions and call-in voting to advance dancers from a wide variety of backgrounds through various different dance styles. A season winner is awarded a cash prize, funded study-abroad or work-abroad opportunities (usually in the U.S.) and other prizes, as well as the title "The Netherlands' Favourite Dancer". The winners of the first six seasons have been Ivan Paulovich, Els Smekens, Floris Bosveld, Nina Plantefève-Castryck, Frederic De Smet and Danny Boom.

The first season was hosted by singer Elise van der Horst. From the second season on, Dennis Weening and An Lemmens have co-presented.

== Format ==
The format of the show closely follows that of other entries in the franchise. Dancers first present themselves at open auditions, where they dance in a style of their choosing before a panel of judges. This panel will make one of three determinations. If the dancer simply did not impress, he will be or she will not progress further. If the dancer impressed but the judges have reservations, he or she may be asked to stay until the end of auditions to try to prove themselves by picking up a short piece of expert choreography. If the dancer is found to excel, they may be given a "Ticket to the Bootcamp" and are advanced instantly one step further.

Following the open auditions, dancers are put through a "Bootcamp", a week-long live-in series of workshops, usually held in a foreign locale, where they are drilled and tested in a variety of dance styles. At the end of this process, and after successive waves of cuts, a Top 18 dancers are selected to move on and participate in the "live shows", which are the main segment of the competition and the point at which call-in voting begins.

The live shows place the dancers in groups and duets to tackle routines in various styles that are mostly randomly assigned, leaving dancers from a wide variety of backgrounds often out of their element as they attempt to display versatility and overall dance ability, which is then evaluated by the judge's panel. At-home viewers vote for their favorite dancer or dancers and the three couples with the lowest number of votes are at risk of being eliminated from the competition and must "dance for their life" to avoid being one of the two dancers (one male, one female) eliminated that week. In later weeks the judges lose their authority in this process and the dancers are selected purely by viewer vote. The season ends with a Top 4 dancers and a finale in which the champion is announced.

== Seasons ==
=== Overview and finalists ===
Season	Year	Host	Judges	Bootcamp Locale	Winner	Finalists		
1	2008	EliZe	Dan Karaty; Jaako Toivonen; Euvgenia Parakhina	London, United Kingdom	Ivan Paulovich (Latin)	Timor Steffens (Hip-Hop)	Annemiek Suijkerbuijk (Contemporary)	Julia Mitomi (Hip-Hop)
2	2009	An Lemmens; Dennis Weening	Dan Karaty; Nicky Vernieuwe; Jan Kooijman	Los Angeles, United States	Els Smekens (Contemporary/Jazz)	Angelo Pardo (Hip-Hop)	Michael Iongbloed (Ballet)	Evelien Ceulemans (Contemporary/Classical Ballet)
3	2010	An Lemmens; Dennis Weening	Dan Karaty; Euvgenia Parakhina; Jan Kooijman; Marco Gerrits	Moscow, Russia	Floris Bosveld (Hip-Hop)	Lorenzo van Velzen Bottazzi (Extremotion)	Lise Alexander (Jazz-Funk/Hip-Hop)	Natascha Dejong (Jazz/Contemporary)
4	2011	An Lemmens; Dennis Weening	Dan Karaty; Euvgenia Parakhina; Jan Kooijman; Marco Gerrits	Havana, Cuba	Nina Plantefève-Castryck (Contemporary/Classical Ballet)	Anna-Alicia Sklias (Contemporary/Classical Ballet)	Meysam Noori (Hip-Hop)	Anthony Benjamin (Hip-Hop)
5	2012	An Lemmens; Dennis Weening	Dan Karaty; Euvgenia Parakhina; Jan Kooijman; Ish Ait Hamou	New York City, United States	Frederic De Smet (Hip-Hop)	Vivian Cardoso (Jazz)	Kalila Hermant (Hip-Hop)	Denden Karadeniz (Breakdance)
6	2013	An Lemmens; Dennis Weening	Dan Karaty; Euvgenia Parakhina; Jan Kooijman; Ish Ait Hamou	Seville, Spain	Danny Boom (Contemporary)	Anneke Ghysens (Contemporary)	Tamara Arruti (Hip-Hop)	Giovanni Kemper (Jazz)

*	Male contestant	Female contestant

=== Season One ===
The first season was presented by singer EliZe. The permanent members of the judge's panel consisted of Dan Karaty, Jaako Toivonen and Euvgenia Parakhina. The finale was broadcast on 11 December 2008 and concluded with the announcement of Ivan Paulovich as the first winner of the competition. Paulovich won a dance study of choice in America, €20,000, and a dance solo in the musical Footloose. Timor Steffens was the runner-up.

=== Season Two ===
The second season saw a broadening of the show's audience and contestant pool to include the Flemish. The season also began with a change of hosts, with Dennis Weening and An Lemmens taking over presentation from singer Elize. The judges panel also changed with Nicky Vernieuwe and Jan Kooijman taking the places of season one judges Jaako Toivonen and Euvgenia Parakhina. After a season plagued by injuries in the live shows, Els Smekens was announced winner during the 29 November 2009 season finale. Smekens and her partner Angelo Pardo, had been judge and fan favorites from early in the competition and took the top two winning positions. Smekens winning prize consisted off a dance study program of choice in America, €20,000, and a dance solo in the musical Hairspray.

=== Season Three ===
The third season saw a third shake-up of the judges panel, which now consisted of returning judges Dan Karaty, Euvgenia Parakhina, and Jan Kooijman as well as new judge Marco Gerrits. An Lemmens and Dennis Weening continued in the role of co-hosts. Dancer Lorenzo van Velzen Bottazzi, one of the finalists of the second season who was prematurely forced to leave the show after he tore his knee ligaments during the first live show, was allowed to return to the competition. He was not required to audition but was required to re-secure a place in the Top 20 in the Bootcamp phase of the competition. Also returning was Natascha de Jong, a dancer who was selected for the top 20 in season one but was unable to participate for personal reasons. Both dancers earned a place amongst the finalists again and ultimately came in 2nd- and 4th-placed, respectively. First place went to hip-hop dancer Floris Bosveld during the 28 November 2010 finale. Bosveld won €25,000, a choice of dance school opportunities in America and a role in Johan Nijenhuis' Dutch dance film Body Language.

The season was the largest ratings success yet for the show, with average viewership peaking above a million viewers per episode for the first time.

=== Season Four ===
The fact that a fourth season had been commissioned was announced during the third season finale. For the first time no alterations were made to hosting duties or the judges panel from the previous season. However, Dan Karaty was prevented from participating in the bootcamp for this season as it was located in Cuba and Karaty, as an American, is prohibited by the trade embargo between the nations from visiting or working within Cuba. The remaining three judges made the ultimate decision on the season's Top 18 dancers. On the 27 November 2011 finale, ballet dancer Nina Plantefève-Castryck was announced the winner of the fourth season and was awarded a choice of dance school opportunities, a cash prize of €25,000, and a role in a music video of David Guetta. With Anna-Alicia Sklias taking second place, the vote also marked the first time in the show's four seasons that first place and first runner-up both went to female contestants, as well as the first time the top two spots both went to classically trained dancers.

=== Season Five ===
Season Five was officially announced during the season four finale and aired between 2 September and 9 December 2012. The second phase of bootcamp took place in New York.

=== Season Six ===
As with the previous two seasons, the reveal of a renewal was made during the Season Five finale, this time with the additional announcement that online enrollment for auditions via the show's official website were immediately open. This sixth season began airing on September 1, 2013 and broadcast its finale on December 1, 2013

== See also ==
- Dance on television
