= Body Language (2011 film) =

2011 Dutch film

- Theatrical release poster
- Directed by: Jeffrey Elmont
- Produced by: Johan Nijenhuis; Bernard Tulp
- Starring: Floris Bosveld; Ingrid Jansen; Sigourney Korper; Boris Schreurs; Ruben Solognier; Lorenzo van Velzen Bottazzi
- Edited by: Manuel Rombley
- Music by: Russ Howard III
- Production companies: Johan Nijenhuis & Co; Flinck Film; Launch Works; RTL Entertainment
- Distributed by: A-Film Distribution
- Release date: 6 October 2011
- Running time: 100 minutes
- Country: Netherlands
- Language: Dutch
- Box office: $1.5 million

Body Language is a 2011 Dutch romance-dance film directed by Jeffrey Elmont and produced by Johan Nijenhuis and Bernard Tulp. Filming started in January 2011 and completed in July 2011.

Set in New York City, the movie follows five different dancers from different dance crews who came on their own to New York for a dance competition, while their subsidy has been withdrawn, and these die-hard dancers come on their own to fulfill their dreams while juggling with no money and each other's different personalities.

== Cast ==
- Floris Bosveld
- Ingrid Jansen
- Sigourney Korper
- Boris Schreurs
- Ruben Solognier
- Lorenzo van Velzen Bottazzi
