= Everybody Dance Now (Dutch TV series) =

- Genre: Reality
- Created by: Blue Circle
- Presented by: Chantal Janzen
- Judges: Jan Kooijman; Dan Karaty; Lieke van Lexmond
- Country of origin: The Netherlands

Original release
- Network: RTL 4

Everybody Dance Now is a Dutch entertainment dance format from FremantleMedia’s Blue Circle. After every dance performance, the verdict of the judges is delivered by the dance floor.

== Broadcast history ==
Series one aired on RTL 4 from 22 February to 12 April 2013 in the Netherlands. The finale episode took the No.1 spot of the day with a series peak of 1.9m viewers. Overall, the first series averaged 1.6m viewers across the series, with a 20% audience share, exceeding the RTL 4 primetime average by +12%.

The show was commissioned for a second series on RTL 4 which aired from 28 February to 18 April 2014. The show launched as the highest-rated entertainment show of the day across all channels. The total audience share for the series was +44% higher than RTL 4’s primetime average.

The format was sold in Thailand where it launched on Channel 3 on 5 October 2013. The youngest contestant in the competition Stefano was the winner of the show and took home the 1 million baht prize.
