= Ed Wubbe =

Dutch choreographer

Ed Wubbe (Amsterdam, 1957) is a Dutch choreographer.

Since 1992 he has been artistic director of the Scapino Ballet in Rotterdam.

== Selection of choreographies ==
- Oppervlakte (1981) - Introdans Arnhem
- Afstand (1982) - Introdans Arnhem
- Cellorganics (1983) - Werkcentrum Dans Rotterdam
- Frasen (1984) - Introdans Arnhem
- Simple Manouvres (1985) - Introdans Arnhem
- Another Journey (1985) - Introdans Arnhem
- White Streams (1986) - Introdans Arnhem
- Carmina Burana (1987) - Introdans Arnhem
- Nono (1987) - Introdans Arnhem
- Schlager (1988) - Introdans Arnhem
- Messiah (1988) - Introdans Arnhem
- Blue Tattoo (1988) - Scapino Ballet Rotterdam
- Gollywogwalk (1989) - Introdans Arnhem
- The Light of the Sun (1989) - Introdans Arnhem
- De Dood en het Meisje (1989) - Introdans Arnhem
- Solo - (1991) - Introdans Arnhem
- Kathleen (1992) - Scapino Ballet Rotterdam
- Romeo en Julia (1995) - Scapino Ballet Rotterdam
- Nico (1997) samen met John Cale - Scapino Ballet Rotterdam
- Songs for Drella (2011) samen met Marco Goecke - Scapino Ballet Rotterdam
- Pearl (2012) samen met Combattimento Consort Amsterdam - Scapino Ballet Rotterdam
- Le Chat Noir (2013) - Scapino Ballet Rotterdam
- Pas de Deux (2016) samen met Michiel Borstlap - Scapino Ballet Rotterdam
- TING! (2016)) samen met Nits- Scapino Ballet Rotterdam
