= Timor Steffens =

Dutch dancer and choreographer

- Born: 9 October 1987 (age 38); Roermond, Netherlands
- Occupations: Dancer; choreographer; artistic director
- Years active: 2008-present
- Website: timorworld.com

Timor Steffens (born 9 October 1987) is a Dutch dancer.

== Biography ==
Steffens was born in Roermond, Netherlands. At the age of six he moved to Rotterdam. He took both a hairdressing course and an electrical engineering course, but he did not finish either. At eighteen he started dancing and a year later he was accepted at the Codarts. In 2008 he participated in the talent show So You Think You Can Dance. He finished second, behind winner Ivan Paulovich. The American choreographer Dan Karaty, however, was 'very enthusiastic' about Steffens. Thus, two months after the final, he left for the United States, like the winner. In Los Angeles he built up a network of contacts in order to generate more fame.

In May 2009, Steffens obtained a work visa for the United States, allowing him to work in the country until 2011. This was due to a 'big assignment' that he had won. Four days later it was announced that he would be dancing with singer Michael Jackson during his This is it concert series in London that would last from July 2009 to March 2010. However, Jackson died prematurely on June 25, so the concert series never occurred. Steffens said he was "shocked" by Jackson's death. On July 7, 2009, Steffens danced with the other backing dancers at Jackson's memorial service, which was broadcast live worldwide. He also attended Jackson's funeral on September 3, 2009. On October 28, 2009, the film Michael Jackson's This Is It was released, in which Steffens could be seen as a background dancer during the rehearsals.

In the spring of 2010, Steffens collaborated with Jermaine Jackson on the SBS6 program Move Like Michael Jackson. That same year he danced as a background dancer in the film Burlesque and became the face of the shoe store PRO for six months.

Steffens became a member of singer Chris Brown 's dance company in 2011. He performed with the singer and also appeared in Brown's music videos. In the fall of 2012, he appeared as a jury member for the dance and movement category as part of the RTL 4 program Beat the Best. In May 2014, Steffens became the creative director of The Voice of Italy. Since September 2015, Steffens has been a jury member in on RTL 4's Dance Dance Dance (Dutch TV program). He appeared in a 2015 episode of the game show De Jongens tegen de Meisjes.

In 2018, Steffens became the "ambassador" for the Dutch distributor of Suzuki motorcycles.

Steffens appeared as a jury member on the DanceSing in the spring of 2019.

== Private life ==
In 2014, Steffens had a brief fling with Madonna.

Steffens was in a three-year relationship with model Zoey Ivory. They broke up in May 2021.

== Filmography ==
=== Films ===
Year	Title	Role	Notes
2009	Michael Jackson's This Is It	Himself / Dance crew member	Documentary film
2010	Burlesque	Bartender	Cameo appearance
2012	Step Up Revolution	Dancer	
2019	F*ck Love	Daan	Dutch film
2022	Misfit: The Switch	Presentator	Cameo

=== Television ===
Year	Title	Role	Notes
2008	So You Think You Can Dance	Himself / Contestant	Runner-up (season 1)
2010	90210	Dancer	Episode: "The Bachelors"
2012	Beat the Best	Himself / Judge	Dance talent show
2015–2016	The Voice of Italy	None	Artistic director
2015–2019	Dance Dance Dance	Himself / Judge	Dance talent show
2018	Bon Bini Holland 2	Himself	Television film
2018–2020	Amici di Maria De Filippi	Himself / Dance teacher	Talent show (seasons 18–19)
2024	Expeditie Robinson	Himself / Contestant	Runner-up (season 26)
