= An Lemmens =

Belgian television and radio presenter

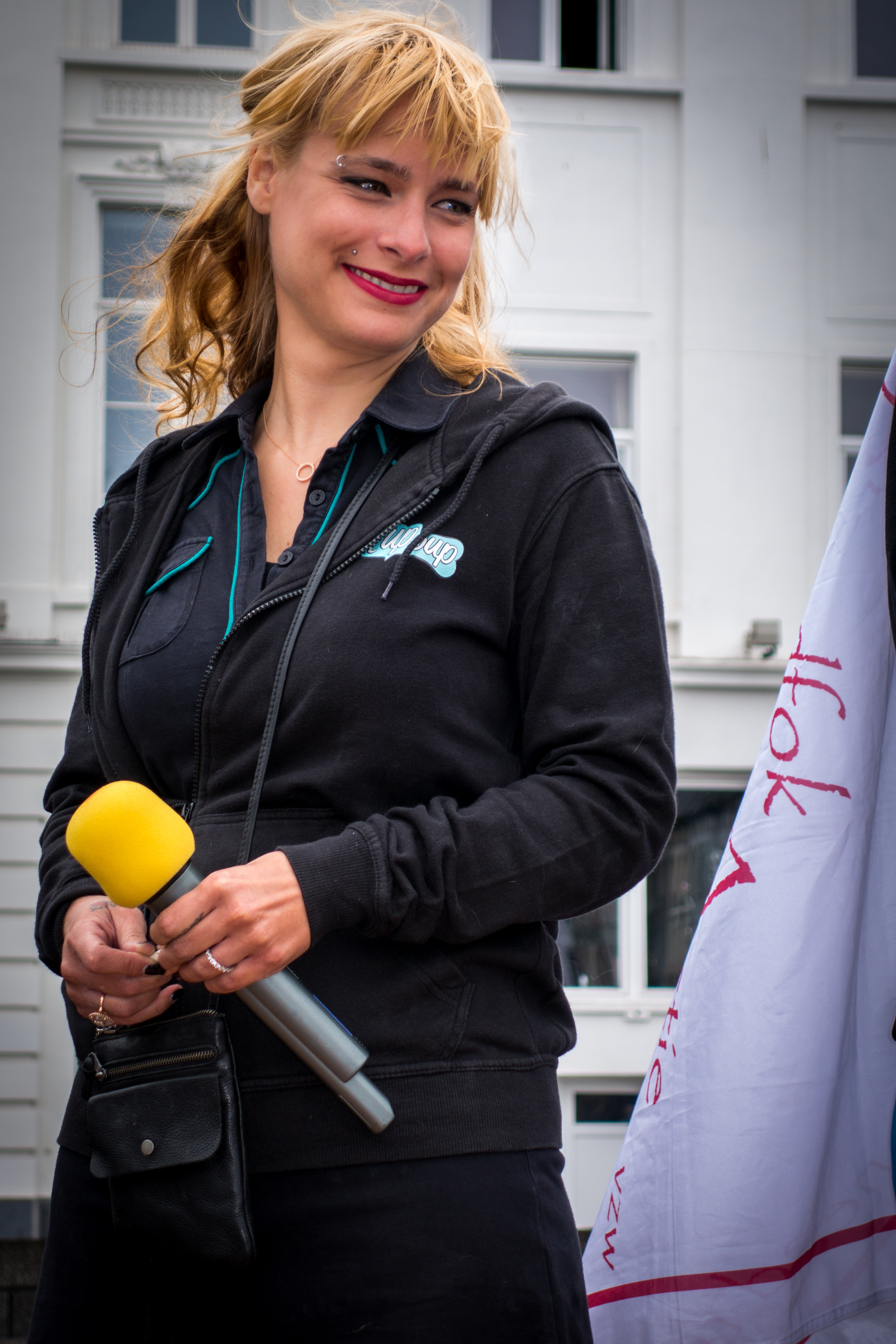
- An Lemmens
- Born: 8 September 1980 (age 46); Sint-Niklaas, Belgium
- Spouses: Sean d'Hondt (m.2008; div.2009); Arne Quinze (m.2012; div.2015)
- Presenting career
- Show: So You Think You Can Dance
- Station: VTM
- Network: Vmma
- Show: De Afrekening
- Station: Studio Brussel
- Network: VRT
- Country: Belgium
- Previous shows: De Grote Volksquiz, Topmodel, Lost in Tokyo

An Lemmens (born 8 September 1980) is a television and radio presenter at VTM/2BE/Studio Brussel and a former VJ on TMF Belgium.

== Career ==
Lemmens, while studying to be a veterinary assistant, was discovered by television broadcast network TMF in 2003. She presented several programs and award shows and became the broadcaster's leading host from 2003 until 2007.

Shows she hosted on TMF include Zoom!, Double Trouble, Oh My God, Dump Your Boyfriend, TMF Café, Dance 'n' Hold, Splash and Al Frisko. She also had her own signature shows L.A. Baby and An Tour where she would meet up with and interview several known bands. Lemmens also became the fixed VJ for De Afrekening, in which she announced a list of the best Alternative songs of the moment. She said TMF farewell during the 2007 TMF Awards.

During the 2007 TMF Awards, Lemmens left TMF to go and work for VTM. Until now she's been host to popular shows as De Grote Volksquiz, Topmodel, Lost in Tokyo and So you think you can dance, a joint production between Belgium and The Netherlands. She combines her work on the commercial television network with presenting on Studio Brussel, one of the public Belgian radio stations.

== Personal life ==
On 24 May 2008, she married former TMF-VJ and the current singer of Nailpin, Sean d'Hondt. In early October 2009, the couple ended their marriage on friendly terms. She married conceptual artist Arne Quinze (ex-husband of Barbara Feltus) on 6 October 2012. In September 2015, Lemmens and Quinze divorced.
