= Roy Julen =

Dutch tap dancer and actor

- Born: May 17, 1976 (age 50); Paramaribo, Suriname
- Occupations: Choreographer, dancer, actor

Roy Julen (born May, 1976) is a Dutch tap dancer, actor, and choreographer of Surinamese origin.

== Career ==
Roy Julen is a choreographer with many production credits in the entertainment industry. He has been the executive choreographer and creative producer for more than 8 years on Dutch and Belgian television shows such as So You Think You Can Dance, The Voice, The ultimate dance battle, Dance Date and The Band as well as the choreographer of Flashdance for Joop van den Ende Theatre productions.

Julen has choreographed live events, music videos, and television productions as well for many pop artists, including Diana Ross, Jason DeRulo, Taio Cruz, Pixie Lott, and Stromae, to name a few. Besides being a choreographer, Roy created his own dance movie "Body language, which was awarded with a Dutch Golden Film Award and was shown in movie theaters in The Netherlands as well as internationally in seven countries.
