= Dan Karaty =

American TV personality and actor

- Born: October 1, 1976 (age 49); New York, US
- Education: New York University
- Occupations: TV personality, dancer, choreographer
- Spouse: Natasha
- Children: 2
- Website: Official website

Daniel Quinn Karaty (born October 1, 1976) is an American TV personality, choreographer, and dancer who primarily appears on Dutch television. He has been a regular jury member on several dance competition programs, including Holland's Got Talent; Everybody Dance Now; Belgium's Got Talent; Avastars; and the American, Australian, Canadian, and Belgian/Dutch versions of So You Think You Can Dance. In his early career, he choreographed for Kylie Minogue, Britney Spears, and 'NSYNC.

== Early life ==
Karaty was born in New York state, just outside of NYC, to Broadway performers Tom and Jane Karaty. He has four older siblings and grew up in Wyckoff, New Jersey. He started dancing at his parents' dance school, In the Spotlight in nearby Waldwick, in 1989. He has a degree in journalism from New York University.

== Career ==
While in college, Karaty taught dance classes at Tremaine Dance Conventions, where he met his friend and future collaborator Wade Robson. He made his Broadway debut in the musical Footloose during his junior year in college. By his senior year, he was choreographing for Britney Spears' tour. Between 1999 and 2000, he also choreographed for Justin Timberlake, 'NSYNC, Kylie Minogue, and Jessica Simpson. In the early days of his career, he choreographed commercials for Xbox Kinect, iPod, Mattel, and Best Buy, as well as Britney Spears' first Pepsi commercial. In 2005, he first appeared on as a permanent judge on the American version of So You Think You Can Dance. In 2008, he became a permanent judge on the Belgian/Dutch version and was a guest judge on the Canadian and Australian versions. In 2009, he competed on Launch My Line. In 2010, he joined Holland's Got Talent as a main judge.

In 2012, he choreographed an interactive musical, Lover of Loser, based on the book by Carry Slee. It toured the Netherlands throughout 2012 and 2013. He had his film debut as Jim in Soof in 2013. In 2015, he was a jury member on the first season of Dance Dance Dance. In 2018, he defeated Michael Boogerd on Boxing Stars; they had a rematch in 2022 at the HIT IT gala and Karaty lost to Boogerd. Karaty was replaced on the jury by Ali B for season 11 of Holland's Got Talent due to the COVID-19 pandemic, which prevented him from leaving the United States. He joined Everybody Dance Now in 2022 and Avastars in 2023.

== Personal life ==
Karaty and his wife Natasha, a former MTV executive, have two children, Quinn and Daniel. In 2020, Karaty contracted an eye infection severe enough to consider having it removed. Vision began returning to his left eye in 2021. Karaty spoke about his 25-year battle with alcoholism for the first time in late 2021. His problem with alcohol started at age 17, when he would routinely get blackout drunk. He decided to go to rehab only after his young daughter expressed concern about his health. He was sober for more than a year and a half by early 2023 and his memoir, If I'm Being Honest, was published later that year. Between 2022 and 2024, he also hosted the podcast If I'm Being Honest about alcoholism.

== Filmography ==
=== Appearances ===
Year	Title	Role	Notes	Refs
2005-2011	So You Think You Can Dance	Himself	Guest judge	
2008-2010	So You Think You Can Dance Canada	Himself	Guest judge	
2008-2013	So You Think You Can Dance (Belgium/Netherlands)	Himself		
2009	So You Think You Can Dance Australia	Himself	Guest judge	
2009	Launch My Line	Himself		
2010	My Name is Michael	Himself	Judge	
2011	Idool	Himself	Guest judge	
2011-2012	The Ultimate Dance Battle	Himself	Head judge	
2013	Soof	Jim		
2013-2015	Everybody Dance Now	Himself		
2014	Dansdate	Himself		
2015-2019	Dance Dance Dance	Himself		
2016	Soof 2	Jim		
2016	Battle On The Dancefloor	Himself		
2016-2019	Belgium's Got Talent	Himself	Seasons 4-6	
2017	Peking Express	Himself		
2017-2018	Soof: een nieuw begin	Jim		
2018	Boxing Stars	Himself		
2018	Time to Dance	Himself		
2019	Dancing with the Stars (Netherlands)	Himself		
2022	Soof 3	Jim		
2022-2025	Make Up Your Mind	Doutzen Points; Kiki Diamonds	3 episodes	
2010-2019; 2022-present	Holland's Got Talent	Himself	Did not appear in 2020 and 2021 due to COVID-19 pandemic and illness	
2023	Avastars	Himself		

=== As choreographer ===
Year	Title	Notes	Refs
2000	Sisqó's Shakedown	Guest choreographer	
2003	Malibu's Most Wanted		
2007	Music & Lyrics	Also appeared as a choreographer	
2008	America's Got Talent	7 episodes	
2009	Did You Hear About the Morgans?		
2014	The Rewrite		
