= Deanna =

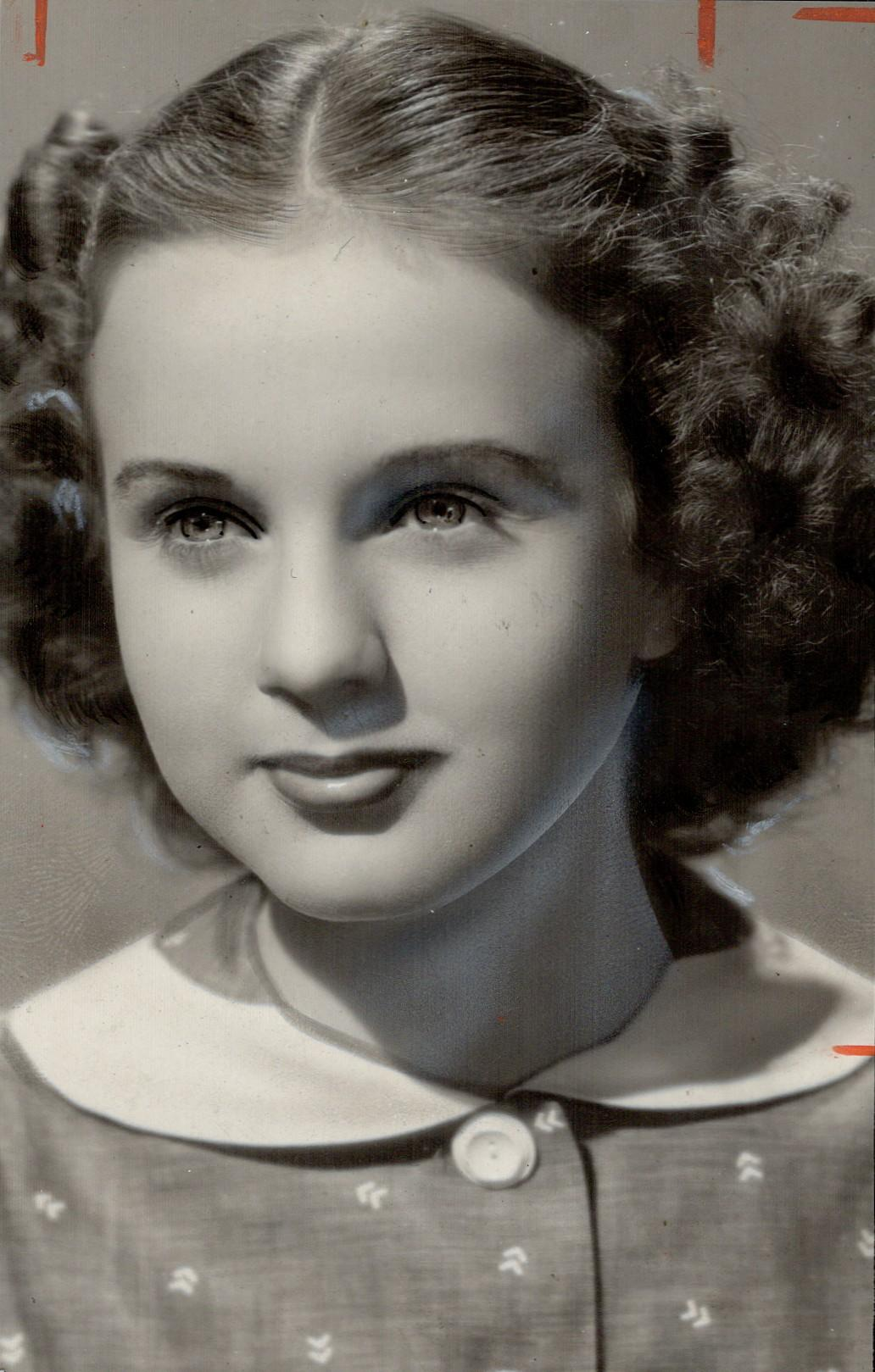
- Actress Deanna Durbin popularized the name.
- Gender: Female
- Language: English, Italian

Origin
- Meaning: Recently created variant of Diana or Dean

Deanna or DeAnna is a feminine given name. It is a variant of the name Diana apparently created in 1936 as a stage name for actress and singer Deanna Durbin, whose given name was originally Edna Mae. The name is also used as a feminine version of the name Dean. Deanne is a variant.

== Usage ==
The name was among the top 1,000 names in use for newborn American girls between 1936 and 2013. Its greatest use was between 1938 and 1941, when it was among the top 150 names for girls, and between 1969 and 1971, when it was among the top 100 names for newborn American girls. It was a top 100 name for girls in Canada between 1937 and 1941 and again between 1969 and 1973. It was also among the top 1,000 names for girls in the United Kingdom at different points until 2008.

== People with the given name ==
- Deanna Archuleta, American politician
- Deanna Ballard (born 1978), American politician
- Deanna Barch, American psychologist and professor
- DeAnna Bennett (born 1984), American mixed martial artist
- Deanna Berry (born 1998), Australian rules footballer
- Deanna Bogart (born 1959), American blues singer, pianist, and saxophone player
- Deanna Bowen (born 1969), Canadian-American visual artist
- Deanna Brooks (born 1974), American glamour model and actress
- DeAnna Burt (born 1969), U.S. Space Force general
- Deanna M. Church, American economist
- Deanna Coates (born 1954), British Paralympic sport shooter
- D. J. Conway (1939–2019), American novelist
- Deanna Cooper (born 1993), English footballer
- Deanna Cremin (1978–1995), American murder victim
- Deanna D'Alessandro, Australian chemist
- Deanna Demuzio (1943–2020), American politician
- Deanna Doig (born 1972), Canadian curler
- Deanna Doughty (born 1993), New Zealand cricketer
- Deanna Dunagan (born 1940), American Actress
- Deanna Durbin (1921–2013), Canadian actress and singer
- Deanna Edwards (1970–2015), American BMX racer
- Deanna Favre (born 1968), wife of American football quarterback Brett Favre
- Deanna Frazier (born 1969), American politician and audiologist
- Deanna Milvia Frosini (1940–2021), Italian painter
- Deanna Gumpf, American college softball coach
- Deanna Hammond (1942–1997), Canadian-American translator and linguist
- Deanna Haunsperger, American mathematician
- DeAnna Hodges, American politician in Arkansas
- Deanna Jackson (born 1979), American basketball player
- Deanna Jurius, American politician
- Deanna Kirk, American jazz musician
- Deanna Kuhn, American psychologist and academic
- Deanna Lockett (born 1995), Australian short track speed skater
- Deanna Lund (1937–2018), American film and television actress
- Deanna Lynne (born 1970), American television producer
- Deanna Manfredi, American psychologist
- Deanna B. Marcum (1946–2022), American librarian and executive
- Deanna Merryman (born 1972), American model
- Deanna Michaux (born 1970) American columnist, author and radio host
- Deanna Milligan, Canadian actress
- Deanna Morse, American experimental filmmaker
- Deanna M. Mulligan (1940–2021), American businesswoman
- Deanna Mustard (born 1980), American voice actress
- Deanna Needell, American mathematician
- Deanna Nolan (born 1979), American basketball player
- Deanna Oliver (born 1952) is an American actress and write
- DeAnna Pappas (born 1981), American television personality
- Deanna C. C. Peluso (born 1979), American-Canadian musician, author and researcher
- Deanna Petherbridge (1939–2024), South African artist, writer and curator
- DeAnna Price (born 1993), American hammer thrower
- Deanna Raybourn (born 1968), American author of historical fiction and historical mysteries
- Deanna Reder (born 1963), Canadian professor of English
- Deanna Ritchie, New Zealand field hockey player
- Deanna Rix (born 1987), American female wrestler
- DeAnna Robbins (born 1959), American actress
- Deanna Rollo, American politician
- Deanna Russo (born 1979), American television actress
- Deanna Self, American politician
- Deanna Sirlin (born 1958), American contemporary artist
- Deanna Smith (born 1980), Australian basketball player
- Deanna Stellato (born 1983), American figure skater
- DeAnna Autumn Leaf Suazo, American painter
- Deanna Summers (1940–2017), American songwriter
- Deanna Syme Tewari (1939–2024), Indian track and field athlete
- Deanna Templeton (born 1969), American artist and photographer
- Deanna Van Buren, American architect
- Deanna Wiener (born 1953), American politician
- Deanna Wong (born 1998), Filipino volleyball player
- Deanna Young (born 1964), Canadian poet
- Deanna Yusoff (born 1967), Malaysian actress

== Fictional characters ==
- Deanna Monroe, fictional character from the television series The Walking Dead
- Deanna Troi, fictional character in the Star Trek universe

== Music ==
- "Deanna", a song by Nick Cave and the Bad Seeds

== Other ==
- Deanna Jo, Alameda Fire Department fire boat in the US

== See also ==
- Deana
