= Peluso =

Peluso is a surname of Italian origin. Notable instances of the surname include:

- Father Angelo Peluso (1801–1854), Franciscan friar
- Anthony Peluso (born 1989), Canadian professional ice hockey player
- Cezar Peluso (born 1942), Brazilian jurist
- Deanna C. C. Peluso (born 1979), American-Canadian musician
- Federico Peluso (born 1984), Italian footballer
- Jessimae Peluso (born 1982), American stand-up comedian and television personality
- Lisa Peluso (born 1964), American soap opera actress
- Maurizio Peluso (born 1985), Italian professional footballer
- Mike Peluso (ice hockey, born 1965), American ice hockey forward with 458 NHL games
- Mike Peluso (ice hockey, born 1974), American ice hockey right winger with 38 NHL games
- Nathy Peluso (born 1995), Argentine singer, songwriter, dancer and pedagogist
- Tony Peluso (1950–2010), American guitarist and record producer
- Vincenzo Peluso, Italian actor

Fictional characters:

- Brian Peluso, character from Conviction (2006 TV series)
