= Jason Donati =

Jason Donati is an animator, educator, and author noted for his animated independent film work, professional career as a 3D visualization artist, and academic authorship including Exploring Digital cinematography, published by Cengage Learning.

Donati worked at Animation Technologies, Inc., KAON Interactive, The New England Institute of Art, Mount Ida College, and Northeastern University as the Director of 3D Animation, Creative Director, Academic Director, Dean of The School of Design and Full Teaching Professor.

== Selected screenings, honors and awards ==
- SIGGRAPH 1999 (Los Angeles, USA)
- SIGGRAPH 2000 (New Orleans, USA)
- ASIFA East 1999 (NYC, USA)
- ASIFA East 2000 (NYC, USA)
- NextFrame International Student Film and Video Festival 1999 (Philadelphia, USA)
- Anima Mundi 1999 (Rio de Janeiro, Brazil)
- Seoul Film Festival 1999 (Seoul, Korea)
- Digital cinematography Scholarship 1999 (Rhythm & Hues Studios)

== Panels, publications and articles ==
- "Educating Tomorrow’s Gaming Leaders" (2010), Panelist, PoweredUp Boston Conference,
- "Distribution U" (2008), Millimeter Magazine, Craig Erpelding
- "Exploring Digital Cinematography" (2007), Cengage Learning, Jason Donati
- "Canvasing the Big Animated Screen" (2006), Animation Magazine, Ellen Wolff
- "Digital Storytelling and SIGGRAPH 99" (1999), Videography Magazine, Brian Blau

== Independent film work ==
- “Head Quarters” (1999), Computer Animation – Creator
- “Evil i” (2000), Computer Animation – Creator
- “Commit to the Line” (2008), Live Action – Animator, Visual Effects

== Education ==
- University of Massachusetts Amherst (Bachelor of Fine Arts Computer Animation)
- Rochester Institute of Technology (Master of Fine Arts Animation)
