= Douglas Lim =

Malaysian actor, comedian, TV host and emcee (born 1977)

- 林有信
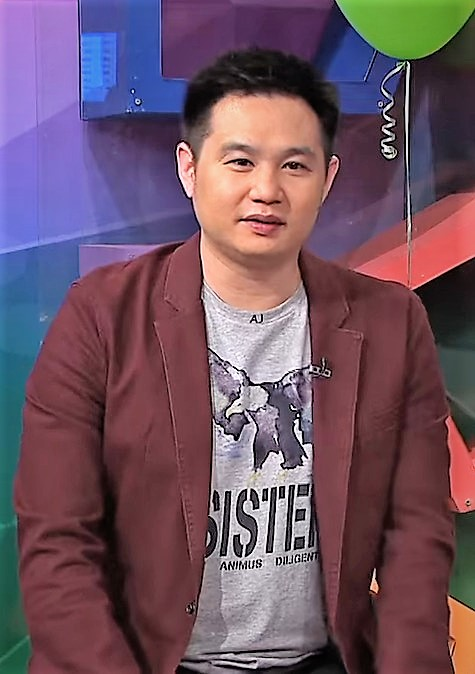
- Lim interviewed on MeleTOP in September 2014.
- Born: 11 October 1977 (age 48); Kuala Lumpur, Malaysia
- Citizenship: Malaysian
- Education: Victoria Institution
- Occupations: Actor; comedian; television presenter; emcee; radio personality; singer
- Years active: 1991–present
- Website: www.douglaslim.com

Douglas Lim (born 11 October 1977, Chinese: 林有信) is a Malaysian actor, comedian, television presenter, and emcee. He is well known for his involvement in local television, theatre, film, and comedy.

== Career ==
Lim appeared in Kopitiam, where he sang the sitcom's theme song, Empty Decorations, with Chelsia Ng. In the series, he played a barber shop owner named Steven. His performance in Kopitiam earned him a nomination for Best Actor (Comedy) at the Asian Television Awards.

Lim is part of a local Chinese comedy titled Homecoming, which aired on Astro Wah Lai Toi. He starred in several TV commercials, including Petronas, TM, Nestlé, Sime Darby, Maybank, HSBC, and UEM. In addition to being a stand-up comedian, he is also an emcee for corporate events.

He acted in the historical film 1957: Hati Malaya, directed by Shuhaimi Baba, in which Lim played the role of an MCA member. On 15 January 2008, Lim produced and hosted the Malaysiantalents.com program for the broadcast on the web portal gua.com.my.

In 2009, Lim founded the Chinese Comedian Association of Malaysia. Lim is also a theater performer; in March 2011, he performed the musical show Lat Kampung Boy: Sebuah Muzikal (Lat [the] Village Boy: A Musical), staged at the Istana Budaya from 16 March to 3 April 2011. He played Frankie, a childhood friend of the cartoonist Lat. The show also starred Awie, Jalil Hamid, Rahim Razali, and Atilia Haron.

He is a guest voice actor in the 2013 animated film Bola Kampung: The Movie, produced by Animasia Studio, an adaptation of the animated series Bola Kampung. Other actors who have guest voice roles include Afdlin Shauki, Aznil Nawawi, Aizat Amdan, Deanna Yusoff, and Marsha Milan Londoh.

From 6 to 18 November 2013, Lim was part of the special theater award actor for Malaysian national football legend Mokhtar Dahari, Supermokh Sebuah Muzikal, staged at the Istana Budaya.

Two years later, Lim shared the stage with Afdlin Shauki, the Bocey comedian trio, and Harith Iskander in a Lawak Ke Der staging at the Pang gung Sari, Istana Budaya. Lim played the role of Jackie in the movie Soulmate Hingga Jannah, directed by Abdul Razak Mohaideen, which aired on 16 February 2017.

From February to April 2019, Lim was one of the actors involved in the Spanar Jaya X sitcom that aired on TV3. Directed by Ahmad Idham (original cast of Spanar Jaya), the sitcom also starred Ben Amir, Uqasha Senrose, and Sangeeta Krishnasamy.

He was one of the lead cast members for the live-action theater of Ola Bola: The Musical, which ran from 18 February to 3 March 2019 at the Istana Budaya. The cast included Luqman Hafidz, Iedil Putra, Hafeez Mikail, Tony Eusoff, and Nabila Huda.

Lim was also one of the co-starring cast of Kopitiam: Double Shot, which aired on Viu on 28 November 2019. It is the latest version of the Kopitiam sitcom. During the COVID-19 pandemic and lockdown, Lim's popularity soared due to his satirical spoofs of popular political leaders and topics of the day.

In 2026, Lim was included on Global South World’s list of the “Top 25 Most Influential Comedians on Instagram in Southeast Asia”.

== Personal life ==
Lim has been married to Natasha Fernz since 12 May 2007.

== Filmography ==
=== Film ===
Year	Title	Role	Notes
1991	O.C.J. Operasi Cegah Jenayah	Irwan friend's	
2002	Day After Tomorrow		
2007	1957: Hati Malaya	Ang Lee / MCA Member	
2009	Los dan Faun	Madre'D	
2009	My Spy	Taiko	
2013	Bola Kampung: The Movie	Szeto	Voice actor
2013	Tanda Putera	Leslie Cheah	
2017	Soulmate Hingga Jannah	Jackie	
2021	Arwah Pak Mat Lif & AJK	Ah Chai	
2021	Chomel	John	
2021	Rumah Madu Ku Berhantu	Mr. Wong	
2023	Polis Evo 3	Inspector Dell	
2024	The Experts	Ah Teck	
2024	Harimau Malaya: The Untold Journey	Lionel	
2024	Baik Punya Ah Long	Fortune Teller	
2024	Don Dukun	Aloysius	
2026	Kudrat 1968: High Council	Inspector Lim Boon Kiat	

=== Theater ===
Year	Title
2007	P.Ramlee The Musical
2011	Lat Kampung Boy Sebuah Muzikal
2012	Lawak Ke Der?
2013	Cuci The Musical
2013	Broken Bridges
2013	Supermokh Sebuah Muzikal
2018	Ola Bola: The Musical
2019	Ola Bola The Musical: Restaging

=== Telemovie ===
Year	Title	Role	TV channel
2017	Lari Hantu Lari	Himself	Astro Citra

=== Television ===
Year	Title	Role	TV channel
1997–2003	Kopitiam	Steven	NTV7
2002	Each Other		TV3
2003	Homecoming		Astro Wah Lai Toi
2004	Living with Lydia		MediaCorp Channel 5
2007	Let's Breakfast 2		TV 2
2008	Malaysiantalents.com		Gua.com.my
2012	SME: Small Mission Enterprise		NTV7
2016	Komediri		Astro Warna
2017	Gegar Lawak		Astro Warna
2017	10 Things We Loved About Malaysians		History Asia
2018	Arena Panggang		Astro Warna
2019	Spanar Jaya X	Henley	TV 3
2019	Kopitiam: Double Shot	Steven	Viu
2021	Budak Intern	Billy	TV9
2022	One Cent Thief	Inspector Lim	Astro Ria
2026	Kudrat 1968: High Council	Inspector Lim Boon Kiat	

== Radiography ==
=== Radio ===
Date	Title	Station
30 July 2021– 30 December 2022	Douglas Lim & Juanita in the Morning	Fly FM

== Discography ==
Single
Year	Song title	Artist
2022	"ADUH"	SonaOne
