= Bola Kampung: The Movie =

- Film poster
- Directed by: Ah Loong; Chong Tee Chua
- Written by: Fairul Nizam Ablah; Chong Tee Chua; Ah Loong
- Produced by: Edmund Chan; Raye Lee; Teik Cheng Leow; Teik Siong Leow
- Starring: Ezlynn Afdlin Shauki Harris Alif Aznil Nawawi Marsha Milan Londoh Harun Salim Bachik Noh Salleh Deanna Yusoff Aizat Amdan Douglas Lim Dilly Mixfm (Adilla Shakir) Meester Bones Baki Zainal Mamat Rahhim Omar
- Music by: Francis Cobb; Noisy Bunch
- Production company: Animasia Studio
- Distributed by: iflix
- Release date: 21 March 2013
- Running time: 97 minutes
- Country: Malaysia
- Language: Malay
- Budget: MYR 6 million
- Box office: MYR 650,000

Bola Kampung: The Movie is a 2013 Malaysian Malay-language animated science fantasy film co-directed by Ah Loong and Chong Tee Chua, based on the animated series Bola Kampung produced by Animasia Studios and Young Jump Animation. The movie was a moderate commercial success, released on March 21, 2013, in Malaysia and April 2013 in Indonesia. It is the first Malaysian animated film to be produced in 3D stereoscopic format.

== Plot ==
Amanda, a young princess of the virtual world game Kingdom Hill, was sent to Kampung Gong Lech to find the legendary "Solar Warrior", a savior to the crisis his Kingdom.

Unfortunately, the princess had lost her memory when she arrived in Kampung Gong Lech. Iwan, mistook her as supposed cousin that came to visit him during school holidays. Princess Amanda then happy spending her days in the village of Iwan and his colleagues did not know that the evil villain of the virtual game world have sent assassins after him.

As time passed, Princess Amanda slowly regains her lost memories. Solar Warrior his quest for an end when she realized that she was looking for a hero chosen is drunk all together. Unfortunately, he was captured by the assassin and had to return to the Kingdom Hill.

John and his friends hatched a plan to help Princess Amanda and save his kingdom from evil villains. However, Kumar, a young scientist The village notice something has gone terribly wrong with the virtual game. He believes the cause of the threat to the Kingdom Hill is vicious virus that has invaded the game for a few days.

With no other options at hand, Iwan, drunk and Azizul enters cyberspace Kingdom Hill hoping to save Princess Amanda and destroy Lord Vilus before it's too late.

== Voice cast ==
- Ezlynn as Iwan
- Afdlin Shauki as Sabok
- Harris Alif as Azizul
- Aznil Nawawi as Lord Vilus
- Marsha Milan Londoh as Amanda
- Aizat Amdan as Mat
- Baki Zainal as Santokh
- Adilla Shakir (Dilly MixFM) as Nasha
- Meester Bones as Kumar
- Douglas Lim as Szeto
- Harun Salim Bachik as Tok Ayah
- Mamat as Mid
- Meester Bones as Mud
- Rahhim Omar as King
- Deanna Yusoff as Queen

== Production ==
The movie was revealed by Animasia Studios Managing Director, Edmund Chan on 13 March 2012. About 14 popular Malaysian celebrities lend their voices for their respective characters in the movie, among them are Ezlynn, Afdlin Shauki, Aznil Nawawi, Baki Zainal, Deanna Yusoff and Rahhim Omar. Vocalist of the Malaysian rock band, Hujan, Noh Salleh also involved.

Animasia Studio spent MYR6 million for the production of the film.

== Release and reception ==
Originally slated for the end of 2012 release, the movie was officially released on March 21, 2013.

== See also ==
- Bola Kampung
