= 1965 (film) =

- Theatrical release poster
- Directed by: Randy Ang; Daniel Yun
- Written by: Andrew Ngin Chiang Meng; Randy Ang; Daniel Yun
- Produced by: Daniel Yun; Ng Say Yong
- Starring: Qi Yuwu; Deanna Yusoff; Joanne Peh; James Seah; Sezairi Sezali; Mike Kasem; Lim Kay Tong
- Cinematography: Amandi Wong
- Edited by: Lawrence Ang
- Music by: Alex Oh
- Production companies: Blue3 Pictures mm2 Entertainment
- Distributed by: Shaw Organisation
- Release date: 30 July 2015
- Running time: 130 minutes
- Country: Singapore
- Languages: English; Mandarin; Malay
- Budget: S$2.8 million
- Box office: US$436,690

1965 is a 2015 Singaporean historical thriller film directed by Randy Ang and Daniel Yun. The film was released in cinemas on 30 July 2015 to commemorate fifty years of Singapore's independence. It stars Qi Yuwu, Deanna Yusoff, Joanne Peh, James Seah, Sezairi Sezali, Mike Kasem, and Lim Kay Tong as Singapore's founding prime minister Lee Kuan Yew.

== Cast ==
- Qi Yuwu as Inspector Cheng
- Deanna Yusoff as Khatijah
- Joanne Peh as Zhou Jun
- James Seah as Seng
- Sezairi Sezali as Trainee Constable Adi
- Mike Kasem as Raj
- Lim Kay Tong as Lee Kuan Yew
- Nicole Seah as Mei
- Yi En as Xiao Yun
- Andi Hazriel as Rafi
- Benny Soh as Sergeant Goh
- Douglas Lam as Corporal Ah Chan
- Jonnie Swarbrick as Assistant Commissioner Charles P. Watson
- Calvin Tan as Ah Kai
- James Wang as Ah Gu
- Ellen Li as Madam Cheng
- Liang Than as old Zhou
- Chloe Wesbter as Sue
- Qi Zhihua as old Inspector Cheng
- Den Sabari as Rahman
- Rafidah Yusoff as Fatimah
- Haslinnah Jaaman as Aisah

== Production ==
The film was conceptualised in five years. The film shooting started in November 2014, with the biggest percentage shot in Batam, at various locations, and at Infinite Frameworks Studios’ sound stages there.

Tony Leung Chiu-wai was initially supposed to play the role of Lee Kuan Yew. However, many Singaporeans were against this, as there was the preference of having a Singaporean actor for this role. The role was given to Lim Kay Tong. David Lee of the Singapore Film Society said that Lim "has the gravitas required of the role, and he's English-speaking as well". Lim prepared for the role for several months and visited the National Archives of Singapore at least five times a week to study Lee's audio and film clips.

== Music ==
The two songs written for the film were Sezairi Sezali's "Selamat Pagi" and Gentle Bones' "Sixty Five". The latter was on the top of the iTunes Singapore song chart for four weeks.

== Reception ==
John Lui of The Straits Times gave 1965 a 1.5 out of 5 stars. He said "it wants to be Important, with a capital I", and "it feels only slightly more relevant to the national birthday than a chicken bun with an SG50 sticker slapped on it."

== See also ==
- List of Singaporean films of 2015
