= Nicole Seah =

Singaporean former politician (born 1986)

- 佘雪玲
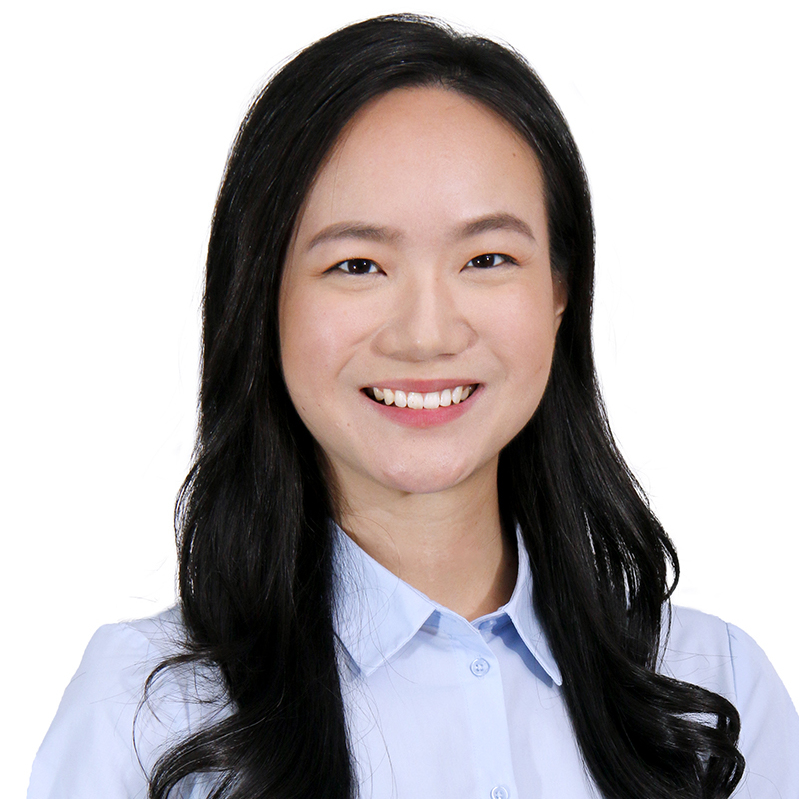
- Official portrait, 2021
- Born: Nicole Rebecca Seah Xue Ling; 17 October 1986 (age 40); Singapore
- Education: National University of Singapore (BSocSci)
- Political party: Independent
- Other political affiliations: Reform Party (2009–2011); National Solidarity Party (2011–2014); Workers' Party (2015–2023)
- Spouse: Bryan (m. 2015)
- Children: 2
- Parent(s): Leonard Seah (father); Patricia Lim (mother)

Nicole Rebecca Seah Xue Ling (Chinese: 佘雪玲; pinyin: Shé Xuělíng; born 17 October 1986) is a former Singaporean politician.

== Early life and education ==
Seah attended CHIJ Katong Convent, Tanjong Katong Secondary School, and Victoria Junior College before graduating from the National University of Singapore with a Bachelor of Social Science degree, with Honours, in communications. She was also part of the University Scholars' Programme, and was the managing editor of an online publication called the Campus Observer during the third year of her undergraduate studies.

== Advertising career ==
Previous to her first run for political office in 2011, Seah worked as an executive at Starcom MediaVest Group, a brand communications company.

Seah worked as a senior account manager with IPG Mediabrands. In 2014, Seah moved to Bangkok, Thailand, to work as a digital manager at the company's Thailand office.

In 2020, Seah was an associate director at a multinational marketing company.

== Political career ==
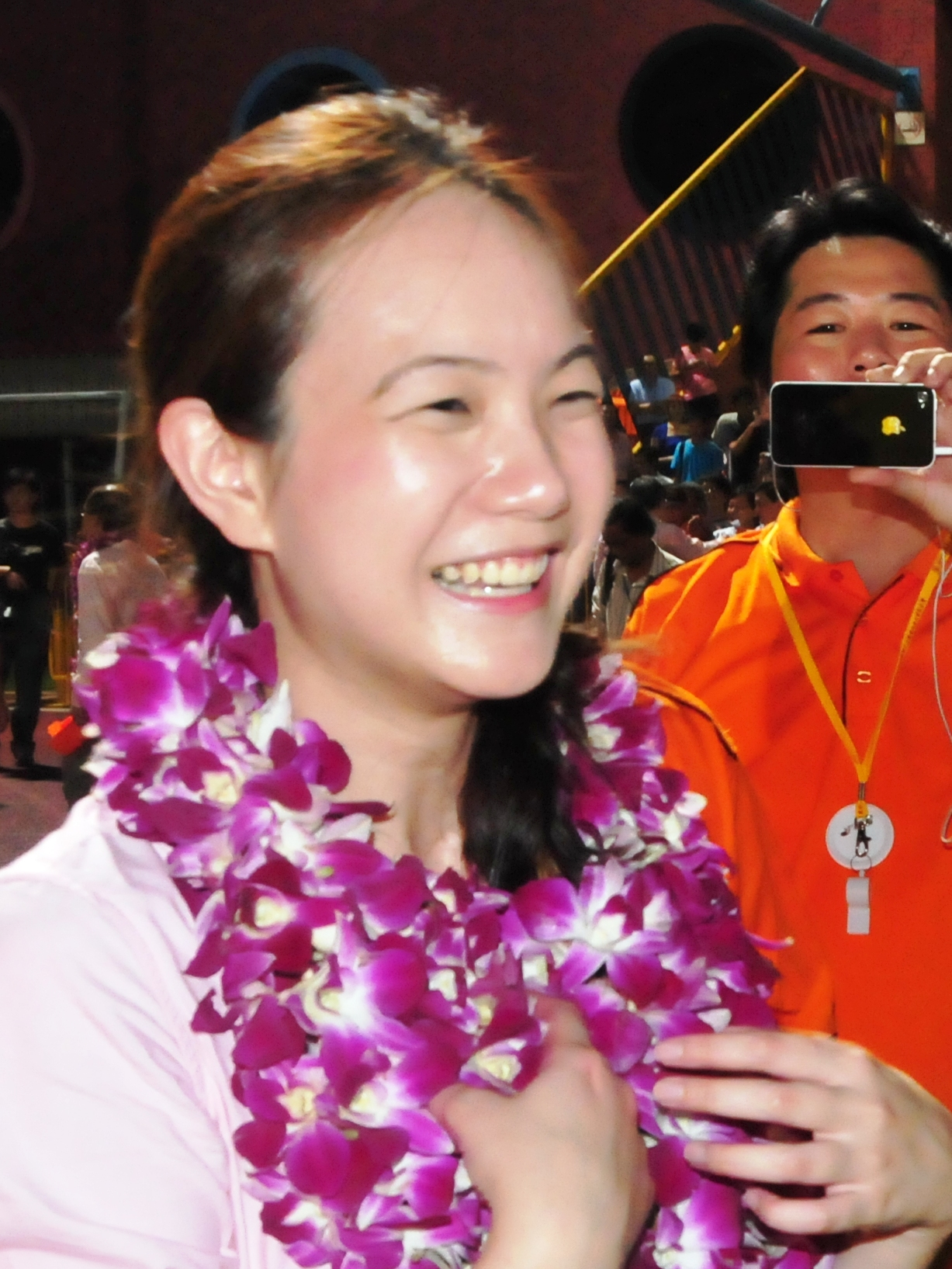
Seah in 2011 during her rally speech at Tampines Stadium as a candidate of the National Solidarity Party

Seah became involved in community activities and volunteering as a secondary school student. Her interest in politics was sparked by a meeting with a destitute woman, who, despite having a place to live, had no money for food and was completely dependent on handouts from charity.

=== National Solidarity Party ===
Seah was involved with the Reform Party from 2009 until early February 2011, when she left alongside several other party members. She was invited to join the National Solidarity Party (NSP) by secretary-general Goh Meng Seng.

On 21 April 2011, Seah was announced as a member of the five-person NSP team contesting for the Marine Parade Group Representation Constituency (Marine Parade GRC) in the 2011 Singaporean general election. Seah was the youngest candidate running. This was the first time since 1992 that an opposition party had contested the GRC. Several week earlier, the People's Action Party (PAP) announced that their five-person team contesting Marine Parade GRC would include 27-year-old Tin Pei Ling, leading to immediate media attention to the contest between two young women, both contesting parliament seats for the first time, from opposing parties. Seah's popularity was referred to as "rockstar"-like by The Straits Times. Tin faced online criticism after her candidacy was announced. Jon Russell of Asia Sentinel wrote that "her popularity [is] testament to many choosing her as their preferred 'youth' candidate in the election".

Yahoo! News commented that Seah appeared to upstage her constituency team and other members of the NSP. On 27 April, Goh Chok Tong, former prime minister and Seah's opponent from the People's Action Party (PAP) team, complained that "I look at NSP and they appear to have only one person in charge and the four men are leaving it to the young lady to campaign and say all the things". The party was also referred to as the "Nicole Seah Party". Seah responded, "The NSP is all about teamwork. There are many different areas that everyone can contribute and that's how we synergise and bring our talents together to the table."

The NSP received 43.35% of the votes, but did not win the constituency. However, this result represented a substantial increase from the opposition's performance in the constituency's previous contested election, 1992 by-election, when the PAP received 72.9% of the votes. The PAP team was led by former prime minister Goh Chok Tong, and its share of the vote was below the party’s national average. Goh later said, in an interview with The Straits Times, that he expected a stronger result and identified Seah as a factor in the NSP's good showing.

During the election, Seah lodged a police report alleging that PAP candidate Tin Pei Ling had broached the state-mandated 24-hour campaign cooling-off period. The police later investigated Seah over an alleged breach of the same rule, and both candidates were issued stern warnings.

After the election, Seah made an online appeal for donations for her campaign on her Facebook account. On 23 May 2011, the NSP issued a statement supporting her actions.

==== Endorsement of presidential candidate ====
On 30 July 2011, Seah endorsed presidential candidate Tan Jee Say, saying that "We need a President who is intellectual, who is a brilliant thinker, and not only that, someone who has a heart for the people and who can represent Singapore on the greater world stage."

Seah had appeared as a guest speaker at Tan's presidential rally on 23 August 2011 and acted as a counting agent for Tan during the election.

On 28 August 2011, the presidential election ended with Tan coming in third in the four-person race, garnering 25.04 per cent or 529,732 votes out of 2.1 million cast. Dr Tony Tan was elected with a slight margin of 7,269 votes. His closest contender overall was Dr Tan Cheng Bock.

"Tan Jee Say came in a very close second to Dr Tony Tan [at Seah's counting centre], so all of us had higher hopes that he might have perhaps pushed through. But nevertheless, I still feel that he put up a very good fight. All of us are very proud of him and I'm sure a lot of Singaporeans are also proud of him for having stood by his political ideologies. I wouldn't say he really lost outright, but the numbers varied. It was quite an even split; it was just unfortunate that he had a smaller share of it", said Seah.

On 23 November 2013, Seah wrote a lengthy post on her personal Facebook page, recounting her experience in the time since the 2011 general election, stating that she had been "derailed" from her "larger purpose", the possibility of being elected in 2016, and that she had suffered a meltdown over a series of events that unfolded that year in her life.

"Needless to say, when you start thinking about your life in 5 year blocks, you start to get equally myopic about the way you do things", she wrote, adding that she was exhausted by her daily routine of work, house visits, and walkabouts. She referred to a "terrible, irreversible mistake" she made during the presidential election two years ago as well, but did not give specifics, only saying she "completely underestimated what her lobbying could do". She had thrown her weight behind presidential candidate Tan Jee Say during that time, speaking at his rallies and going on walkabouts with him.

Seah said she "felt like a fraud" being invited to speak at conferences when she was not an expert on "everything or anything", becoming self-conscious about her need to look and appear a certain way "so people wouldn't walk away feeling they've been cheated". "I was only cheating myself", she wrote, revealing also that she was constantly being stalked with threats of rape and death, and how she was played out dating 2-3 men who were "obviously more interested" in her public profile than who she really was as a person. The combination triggered the start of her meltdown.

Seah shared that she was "very stressed" and "unable to live up to what was expected of her" at the digital sales agency she worked at, and suffered a physical panic attack at work in February of that year, allegedly after learning that her grandmother had been diagnosed with third-stage stomach cancer. She then went on two months of medical leave, left her job, and contracted dengue fever. She subsequently took on another job working with companies in India, that it "didn't work out as well", and that she was terminated without the standard one-month compensation. Her health then declined further, when she was hospitalized for half a month, writing that she "practically subsisted on crackers and water because she was too weak to eat anything else".

In her next Facebook post, Seah added that she was also "grateful for her experiences". She said she would be selling 90 percent of her clothes to earn a bit of money, and stick to just 10 outfits for work. "The only way now is to go up," she concluded.

=== Resignation from National Solidarity Party ===
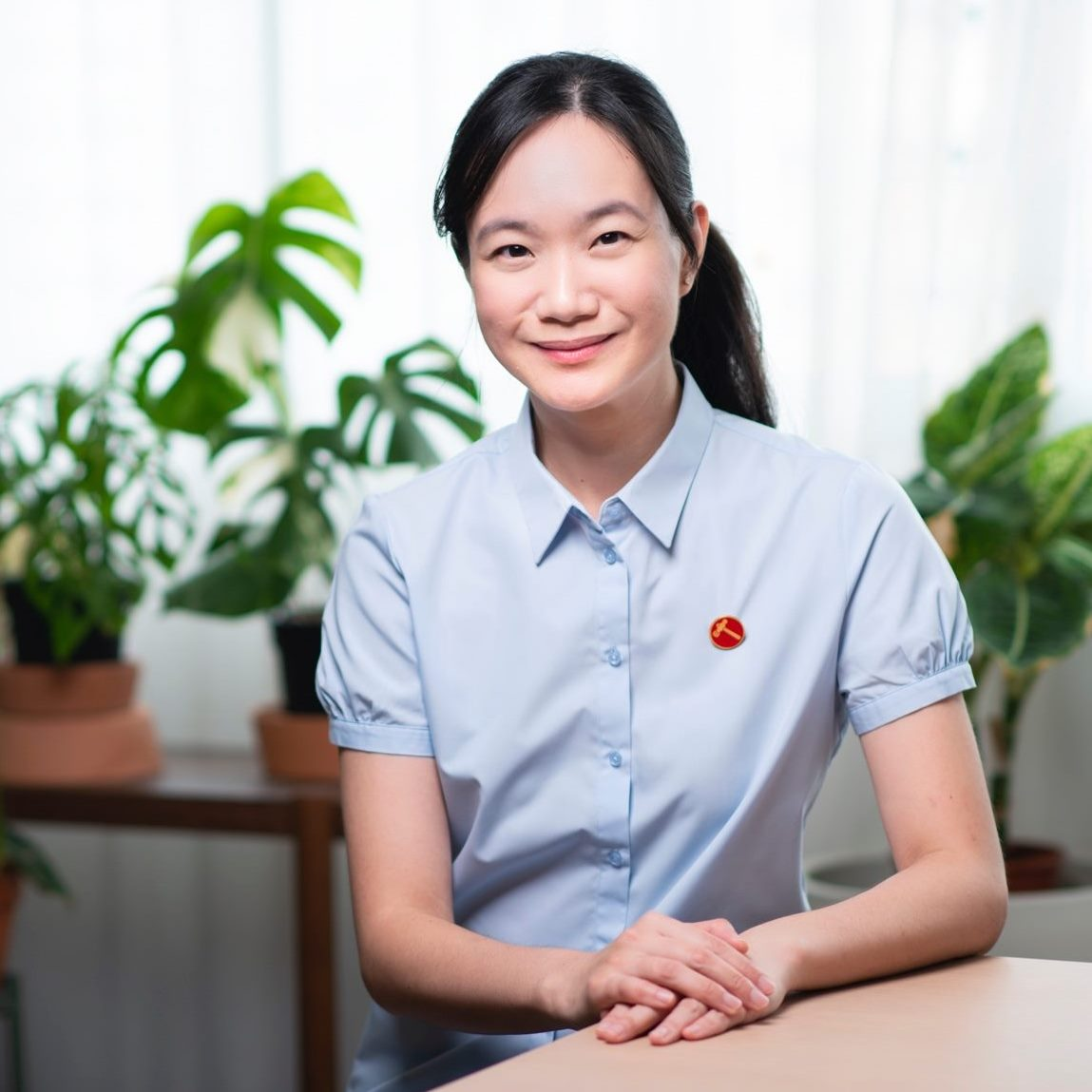
Seah as a Workers' Party candidate

On 29 August 2014, Seah resigned from the National Solidarity Party in an email statement. Seah, who was based in Bangkok, said the decision was "extremely difficult", stating that "there was nothing which might have happened to trigger this departure. I started in politics as a fresh graduate wanting to make a difference, by bringing more political awareness and interest to young people ... It's reached a point where I feel that my job is done (for now) and I have to move on and grow in other areas." She wished the National Solidarity Party all the best, stating that: "For myself, this is not a complete departure from politics ... I will just need to find a more suitable platform to contribute and give back."

On 2 August 2015, Seah stated that she would not be rejoining the National Solidarity Party and would not be standing for election, adding that she had "been in touch" with the party's assistant secretary-general Reno Fong and organizing secretary Spencer Ng on Facebook. She was based in Bangkok at that point in time.

=== Workers' Party ===
A few days later on 24 August 2015, Seah sparked speculation over her political allegiance when she commented on a Facebook post linking to an article on He Ting Ru, who had contested as a candidate for the Workers' Party. In one reply, she said: "I will definitely come back to help! Just not as a candidate." She had since begun volunteering with the Party's media team after the 2015 general election.

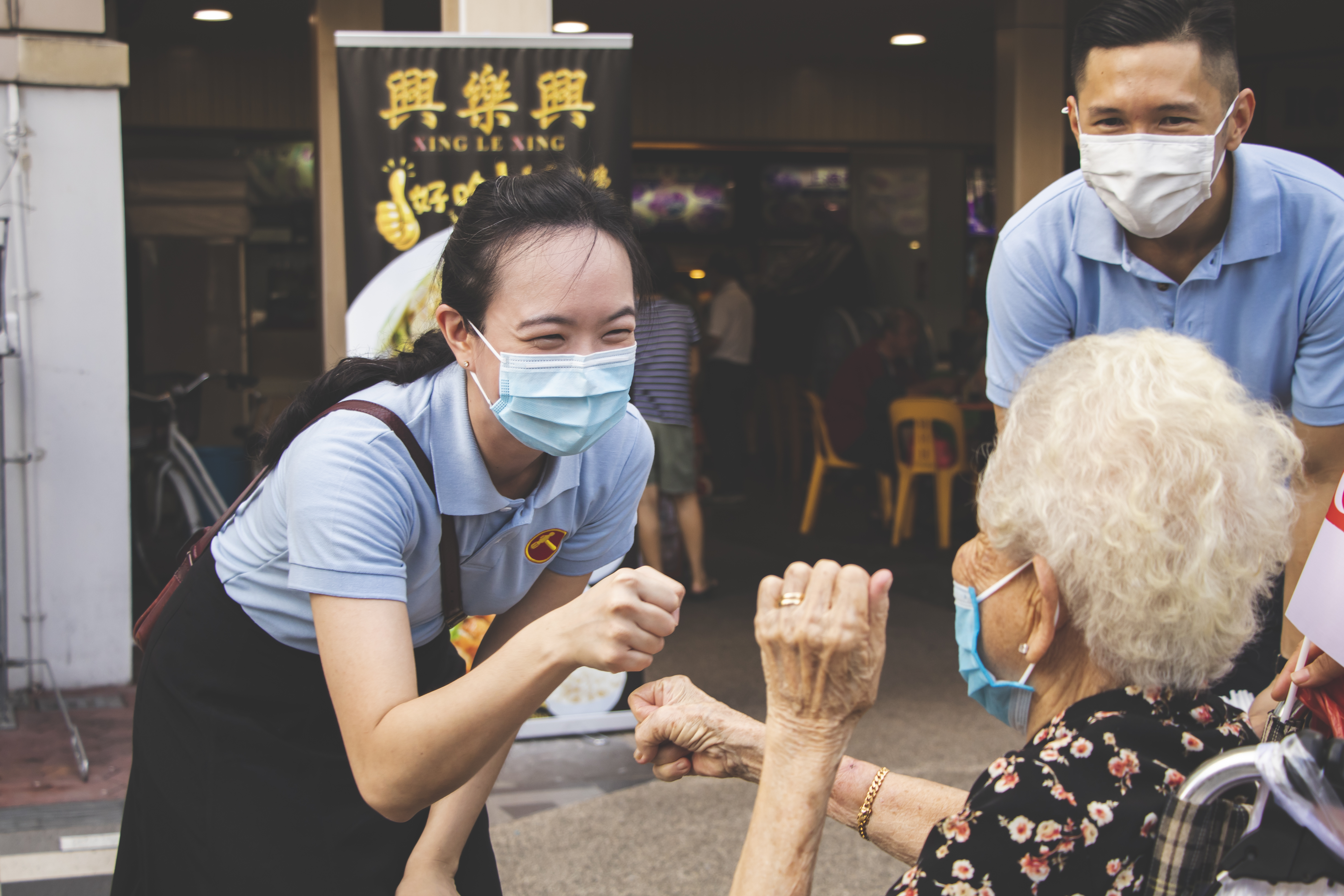
Seah fist-bumping an elderly lady

On 23 June 2020, the Workers' Party featured Seah in a teaser video titled "GE2020: Coming Soon". She was revealed as a candidate by the party on 25 June 2020, and was announced to be contesting in a five-member Workers' Party team for the East Coast Group Representation Constituency in the 2020 Singaporean general election, where they faced off against deputy prime minister and former Tampines Group Representation Constituency MP Heng Swee Keat. They were defeated in a 53.41% to 46.59% vote, the highest result attained for the losing candidates for their party, and the second best-performing score among losing candidates, only behind Progress Singapore Party's West Coast GRC's percentage of 48.31%.

On 6 January 2021, Seah was appointed as president of the party's youth wing.

On 19 July 2023, the Workers' Party announced that Seah had resigned from the party, after a video was published on Facebook showing her and Leon Perera behaving intimately with one another. Party leader Pritam Singh told the press that he would have "sacked both of them" had they not offered their resignations, as they had initially been untruthful when they were first asked about rumours of an affair between them following the 2020 general election.

== Personal life ==
On 27 November 2013, news site AsiaOne and newspaper Lianhe Wanbao issued an apology to Seah after they had inaccurately suggested that Seah was dating a married man. The man in question is Steven Goh, founder of the social site mig33, who was a divorcee. Seah noted via Facebook that she had threatened to sue. As her boyfriend distanced himself from her as he was concerned about his reputation back then, Seah and Goh have since split up. "Instead of supporting me through the ordeal, he left me to deal with the aftermath alone... Though I would have struggled silently in the past, this time I refused. I ended the eight-month relationship and I'm now single and happier than before." She revealed in an interview with Her World.

Seah married Bryan, a Singaporean engineer based in Australia, in a ceremony at the Registry of Marriages in August 2015. Seah gave birth to a daughter in 2018, and another daughter in 2022.

Seah had a small role in a 2015 SG50 film 1965 as Mei, the wife of a police inspector played by Qi Yuwu. The cameo role was offered by the director Randy Ang.

== Filmography ==
Film
| Year | Title | Role | Notes | Ref |
|---|---|---|---|---|
| 2015 | 1965 | Mei | | |
