= Titi Kamal =

Indonesian actress and model (born 1981)

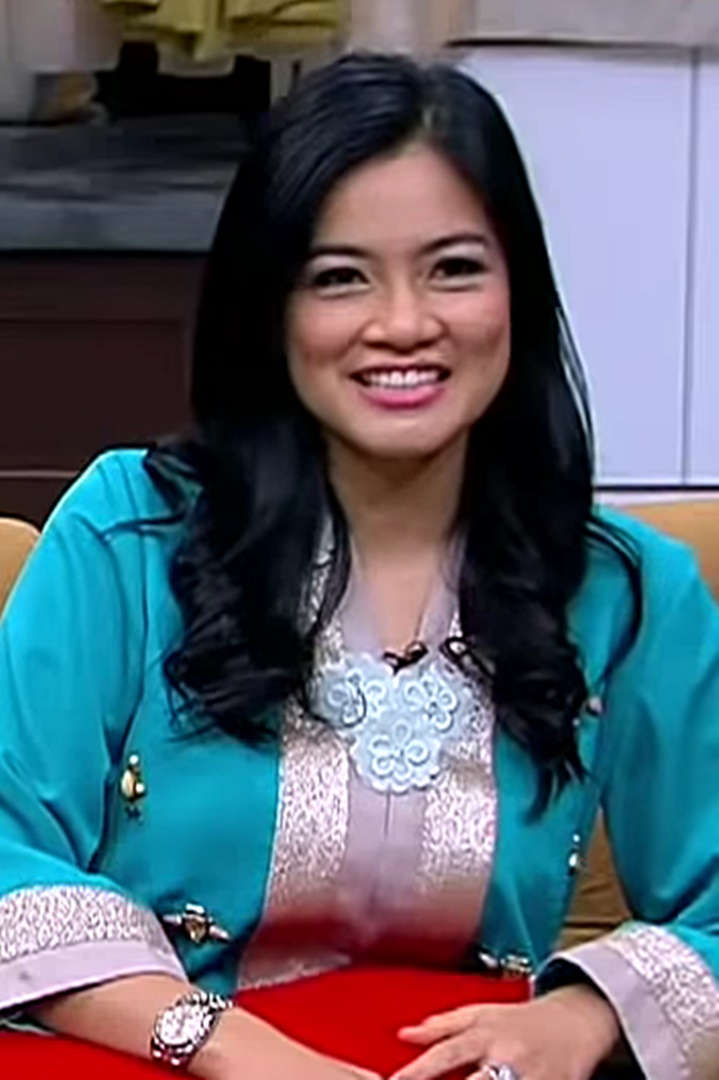
- Born: Kurniati Kamalia; 7 December 1981 (age 44); Jakarta, Indonesia
- Other name: Titi Kamal
- Occupations: Actress model singer
- Years active: 1994–present
- Spouse: Christian Sugiono (m. 2009)
- Children: Arjuna Zayan Sugiono; Kai Attar Sugiono
- Parent: Kamal Badri (father); Elly Rosniati (mother)

Kurniati Kamalia (born 7 December 1981), better known as Titi Kamal, is an Indonesian actress and model of Palembang descent.

== Biography ==
Kurniati Kamalia was born in Jakarta on 7 December 1981 to Kamal Badri from Palembang and Elly Rosniati of Bengkulu, both of Palembang descent; she is the youngest of the couple's five children. She started modelling in the 1990s. In 1997, she was Aneka magazine's cover girl of the year.

In 2002, Kamal played a high school student alongside Dian Sastrowardoyo in Ada Apa dengan Cinta? (What's Up with Love?). This led to her becoming "one of the most sought-after young actresses" in the country. The following year she had minor role in Eiffel I'm in Love as the girlfriend of the male lead, played by Samuel Rizal; Kamal's character ultimately plays second fiddle to the female lead, played by Shandy Aulia. In the scene in which Kamal's character Intan arrives in Paris, slow motion reminiscent of Halle Berry's introduction in Die Another Day is used; Kamal was introduced in a similar manner in several subsequent films.

In 2005, Kamal played in several television serials, including Hantu Jatuh Cinta (Ghosts Falling in Love) and Pura-pura Buta (Pretending to be Blind). That same year, she opened the first of her chain of restaurants. In 2006, Kamal starred as a pop rocker turned dangdut singer in Mendadak Dangdut (Suddenly Dangdut).

In 2008, Kamal performed in D.O. (Drop Out) as a sexually deprived, socially awkward teacher. She modeled her character on women in similarly themed comedies such as The Art of Seduction and Good Luck Chuck. That same year she performed in Hanung Bramantyo's Doa yang Mengancam (The Threatening Prayer) as a poor prostitute; while preparing for the role, she paid a poor woman for the right to follow the woman and see how she dealt with life.

On 20 February 2009, Kamal released her debut music album. Titled Lebih Baik Sendiri, the album featured a duet with Anji, the lead vocalist of Drive. In 2010, she released a single entitled "Happy". She has also been a brand ambassador for Ultima II cosmetics.

== Style ==
Kamal kept her hair long and straight for ten years, due to contractual obligations with hair product companies. In 2010, coinciding with the launch of a new single, she changed her style to a ponytail. She prefers not to act in horror movies, considering them low brow. Instead, she chooses movies that she is likely to watch herself.

== Personal life ==
Kamal married actor Christian Sugiono in Perth, Australia, on 6 February 2009. The couple had two wedding receptions, one in Australia and the other in Jakarta.

== Filmography ==
| Year | Title | Role | Notes |
|---|---|---|---|
| 2001 | Tragedi | Elsin | Film debut |
| 2002 | Ada Apa dengan Cinta? | Maura | |
| 2003 | Eiffel I'm in Love | Intan | |
| 2004 | Brownies | Invited guest | Cameo |
| 2006 | Mendadak Dangdut | Petris (Iis) | |
| 2008 | D.O. (Drop Out) | Lea | |
| 2008 | Tri Mas Getir | Katrina Katrodipuro | |
| 2008 | Tipu Kanan Tipu Kiri | Wulan | |
| 2008 | Barbi3 | Marion | |
| 2008 | Doa yang Mengancam | Leha | |
| 2012 | Sule, Ay Need You | Ayla | |
| 2014 | Ada Apa dengan Cinta? 2014 | Maura | Short film |
| 2016 | Ada Apa dengan Cinta? 2 | Maura | |
| 2016 | Shy Shy Cat | Inul | |
| 2016 | Hangout | Herself | Cameo |
| 2017 | Demi Cinta | Amara | |
| 2017 | Insya Allah Sah | Silvi | |
| 2018 | D.O.A.: Cari Jodoh | Suci | |
| 2018 | Hanum & Rangga: Faith & the City | Azima Sam | |
| 2018 | Sesuai Aplikasi | Sofiyah | |
| 2018 | Milly & Mamet: Ini Bukan Cinta & Rangga | Maura | |
| 2019 | Rumput Tetangga | Kirana | |
| 2019 | Makmum | Rini | |
| 2021 | Makmum 2 | Rini | |
| 2022 | Jailangkung: Sandekala | Sandra | |
| 2023 | Air Mata di Ujung Sajadah | Aqilla Hamka | |
| 2025 | Tabayyun | Zalina | |

=== Television ===
| Year | Title | Role | Notes |
|---|---|---|---|
| 2001 | Kembang Padang Kelabu | Adisti | |
| 2002 | Lilin Kecil | Uti | |
| 2003 | Cinta Anak Kampus | | |
| 2004 | Chanda | Chanda | |
| 2004—2005 | Pura Pura Buta | Amanda | |
| 2005—2006 | Hantu Jatuh Cinta | Melissa | |
| 2007 | Pembantu Milyarder | Sukiyem | |
| 2008—2009 | Muslimah | Muslimah | |
| 2009 | Musuh dalam Selimut | Riana | Telefilm |
| 2009 | Jiran | Jiran | |
| 2009 | Selingkuh | Desi | |
| 2010 | Baghdad | Sabrina | |
| 2012 | Si Tito dan Nayla | Nayla | |
| 2013 | Bukan Boneka Biasa | | Telefilm |
| 2013 | Lara | Lara | |
| 2014—2015 | Emak Ijah Pengen ke Mekah | Munaroh | |
| 2016 | Tukang Ojek Pengkolan | Tika | |
| 2017 | Cinta dan Kesetiaan | Nisa | |
| 2019 | Janji Suci | Suciwati | |
| 2023 | Di Bulan Suci Ini... | Sri Mulyasari | Miniseries |
| 2023 | Satu Cinta Dua Hati | Salwa | |
| 2023 | Azizah | Azizah | Telefilm |
| 2024 | Tertawan Hati | Soraya | |
| | Kisah 3 Pembunuh | Alika | |

== Awards and nominations ==
| Year | Award | Category | Nominated work | Result | Ref. |
|---|---|---|---|---|---|
| 2004 | MTV Indonesia Movie Awards | Most Favorite Supporting Actress | Eiffel I'm in Love | Won | |
| 2006 | MTV Indonesia Movie Awards | Most Favorite Actress | Mendadak Dangdut | Won | |
| 2006 | Indonesian Film Festival | Citra Award for Best Leading Actress | Mendadak Dangdut | Nominated | |
