= Tipu Kanan Tipu Kiri =

- Directed by: Sharad Sharan
- Written by: Vikramm V. Sood
- Produced by: Sharad Sharan
- Starring: Christian Sugiono; Titi Kamal; Hans Isaac; Catherine Wilson; Natasha Hudson; Sazzy Falak
- Cinematography: Santosh Thundiyil
- Production companies: Tarantella Pictures; Nusantara Films
- Distributed by: Tayangan Unggul
- Release date: 16 October 2008
- Running time: 108 minutes
- Country: Malaysia
- Languages: Indonesian, Malaysian
- Budget: US$ 1.2 Million

Tipu Kanan Tipu Kiri (English: Cheating Right, Cheating Left) is a 2008 Malaysian-Indonesian Malay-language romantic comedy film produced and directed by Sharad Sharan. The film, about a group of friends at the crossroads of life, features actors including Christian Sugiono, Natasha Hudson, Sazzy Falak and Hans Isaac in lead roles.

== Plot ==
Rudy, played by Christian Sugiono, is married to superstar celebrity Wulan, played by Titi Kamal, must keep the marriage a secret because of a clause in Wulan's contract stating that she can't get married. He then gets a job in a company (why and what company isn’t really explained) and accidentally lets it slip that he is married. When his boss (Hans Isaac) wants to meet his wife, all the trouble starts. He hires a woman (Natasha Hudson) to play his pretend wife and things slowly get out of hand.

== Cast ==
- Christian Sugiono as Rudy Affendi
- Titi Kamal as Wulan
- Hans Isaac as Remo Rizal
- Catherine Wilson as Lina
- Natasha Hudson as Sara
- Azwan Ali as Shaarif M
- Fauzi Nawawi as Zulfiqli
- Sazzy Falak as Rina
- Irene Kleefstra as Indrayiti
- R. Madhavan in a cameo appearance

== Production ==
Sharad Sharan was approached by Astro in 2005 to make three films, each with a budget of one million dollars, considerably more than a typical Malay film. Sharad, who had apprenticed as a film maker in the US and Bollywood, was keen to make the films in a manner similar to India films, and expressed his desire to rich prioritise production values. The first movie Diva was released in June 2007, while Tipu Kanan Tipu Kari was the second venture. He subsequently signed on cinematographer Santosh Thundiyil, who had previously worked on films such as Kuch Kuch Hota Hai (1998) and Krrish (2006). Television director Prakash Murugiah worked as an assistant on the sets of the film.

The film features Indonesian actors Christian Sugiono, Titi Kamal as well as Malaysians Natasha Hudson, Sazzy Falak, Hans Isaac and Catherine Wilson in leading roles. Astro requested the presence of Indonesian actors to boost ticket sales in the country.

The film was shot in 45 days during February and March 2007 around the Klang Valley.

The scene featuring Madhavan was shot at Kuala Lumpur Sentral station in March 2007. He agreed to be a part of the film because he had been attached to an animated Tamil film by Sharad Sharan titled Om Ganesha, which eventually did not materialise.

== Release ==
A film critic from CinemaOnline.com wrote "Tipu Kanan Tipu Kiri is a colourful misadventure in unevenness and hollowness". The reviewer added the film "gets one star for Titi Kamal's prancing about, another star for Hans Isaac's effective turn and one more star for the banging soundtrack."
