= Natasha Hudson =

Malaysian actress (born 1982)

- Born: Natasha Liana Hudson; 9 September 1982 (age 43); Ipoh, Perak, Malaysia
- Occupation: Actress
- Years active: 1990–present
- Height: 1.72 m (5 ft 8 in)
- Spouses: Mohd Faiz Mohd Raih (m. 2006; div. 2006) Datuk Shahrin Zahari (m. 2007; div. 2009) Carleed Khaza (m. 2012; div. 2018) Noor Nashriq Sekarnor (m. 2018; div. 2019) Jay Jazmin (m. 2022)
- Children: 3
- Relatives: Tania Hudson (sister)

Natasha Liana Hudson (born 9 September 1982) is a Malaysian actress.

== Career ==
She is an actress that has been seen on numerous television commercials, films and TV series in Malaysia and Indonesia. She also published two books in 2007, one an English poetry book titled My heart, My soul, My passion and a children's story book titled Puisi Indah Si Pari Pari.

In 2007 she was given an award for Most Promising Actress at the Malaysian film festival for her role as Nasrin from her film Chermin.

She has a sister, Tania Nadira Hudson, who is also an actress and model.

She is of Australian-Malay descent. She is a Cultural Muslim.

== Filmography ==
=== Film ===
| Year | Title | Role | Notes |
|---|---|---|---|
| 2007 | Chermin | Nasrin | |
| 2008 | Sumolah | | |
| 2008 | Tipu Kanan Tipu Kiri | Sara | |
| 2011 | Halilinta | | |
| 2013 | Langgar | Amanda | |
| 2013 | Lemak Kampung Santan | Sofia | |
| 2014 | Mamak Cupcake | Kak Teh | |
| 2023 | Kelab Rojak | | |

=== Television ===
- Antara Keju dan Belacan (2011)
- Bait Cinta (2011)
- Deru Ombak (2011)
- Mak Andam Semah (2011) (Telemovie)
- Wanggi Setanggi (2011) (Telemovie)
- Terowong (2011) - (episode: "Kain Kapan")
- Andai Ku Tahu (2012)
- Cinta Luar Biasa (2012)
- Tudung (2012)
- Pulau (2012)
- Bisik Syaitan Berbisik (2021)

=== Theatre ===
- Ibu zain (musical)
- Gamat (musical)

== Awards and nominations ==
Malaysian Film Festival
| Year | Nominated work | Category | Result |
|---|---|---|---|
| 2007 | Chermin | Most Promising Actress | Won |
| 2007 | Chermin | Best Actress | Nominated |

Anugerah Skrin
| Year | Nominated work | Category | Result |
|---|---|---|---|
| 2014 | Lemak Kampung Santan | Best Supporting Actress | Won |
