= Chermin =

- Directed by: Zarina Abdullah
- Produced by: Zarina Abdullah
- Starring: Deanna Yusoff; Natasha Hudson; Khatijah Tan; Farid Kamil
- Edited by: Zarina Abdullah
- Music by: Adeline Wong
- Distributed by: Golden Screen Cinemas
- Release date: 22 March 2007 (Malaysia)
- Running time: 100 minutes
- Country: Malaysia
- Language: Malay

Chermin (English: Mirror) is a 2007 Malaysian Malay-language supernatural horror film directed by Zarina Abdullah starring Deanna Yusoff, Natasha Hudson, Khatijah Tan and Farid Kamil. The story is about a girl named Nasrin (Natasha Hudson) who suffers disfiguring injuries in a car crash. Her mother (Khatijah Tan) discovers an antique mirror

== Synopsis ==
The story is about a girl named Nasrin who suffers disfiguring injuries in a car crash. Her mother discovers an antique mirror. The mirror is not an ordinary mirror; a spirit trapped inside it makes the mirror able to reflect what Nasrin wants to see. Nasrin becomes obsessed with the mirror. On a quest to regain her past beauty, Nasrin submits herself to the mirror spirit by satisfying the mirror's need for blood and revenge.

== Cast ==
=== Main ===
- Deanna Yusoff as Mastura
- Natasha Hudson as Nasrin
- Khatijah Tan as Mak Siti
- Farid Kamil as Yusof

=== Supporting ===
- Maimon Mutalib as Mak Ngah
- Sheila Mambo as Minah
- Soffi Jikan as Zakaria
- Farah Ahmad as Rosnah
- Catriona Ross as Yasmin
- Haryanto Hassan as Hassan
- Lisdawati as Zahrah
- Mustapha Maarof as Pak Din
- Ghazali Abu Noh as the Bomoh
- M. Rajoli as Pak Ungku
- Mak Jah as Mak Andam

== Awards and nominations ==
=== Awards ===
- 2007: 20th Malaysian Film Festival: Most Promising Director: Zarina Abdullah
- 2007: 20th Malaysian Film Festival: Most Promising Actress: Natasha Hudson

=== Awards nominated ===
- 2007: 20th Malaysian Film Festival: Best Film
- 2007: 20th Malaysian Film Festival: Best Sound Effect
- 2007: 20th Malaysian Film Festival: Best Film Director
- 2007: 20th Malaysian Film Festival: Best Actress
- 2007: 20th Malaysian Film Festival: Best Actress in a Supporting Role
- 2007: 20th Malaysian Film Festival: Best Screenplay
- 2007: 20th Malaysian Film Festival: Best Cinematography
- 2007: 20th Malaysian Film Festival: Best Editor
- 2007: 20th Malaysian Film Festival: Best Original Music Score
- 2007: 20th Malaysian Film Festival: Best Art Direction
