= Aku Haus Darahmu =

- Directed by: Aidilfitri Mohamed Yunos
- Written by: Fairul Nizam Ablah
- Produced by: Wan Sariah Wan Jaafar
- Starring: Deanna Yusoff; Nad Zainal; Sweet Qismina; Zoey Rahman
- Edited by: Zahari Affendi; Aidilfitri Mohamed Yunos
- Music by: Onn San
- Production company: Tsar Asia Sdn Bhd
- Distributed by: Tsar Asia Sdn Bhd
- Release dates: 2 February 2017 (Brunei, Malaysia and Singapore)
- Running time: 110 minutes
- Country: Malaysia
- Language: Malay

Aku Haus Darahmu is a 2017 Malaysian horror film directed by Aidilfitri Mohamed Yunos, starring Deanna Yusoff, Nad Zainal, Sweet Qismina and Zoey Rahman.

== Plot ==
Set in the 1980s, the movie follows Lia, an anthropologist who learns of a traditional Malaysian dance in danger of extinction called Suku. They and their friends travel to the interior of Malaysia to record this art. While learning about Suku they begin to realize it may be supernatural.

== Cast ==
- Deanna Yusoff as Cempaka Sulastri
- Nad Zainal as Lia
- Sweet Qismina as Ezza
- Zoey Rahman as Arin
- Amalia Syakirah as Kenanga

== Release ==
The film opened in theatres on 2 February 2017.

== Reception ==
Dennis Chua of the New Straits Times praised the performances of Yusoff, Zainal, Rahman and Syakirah, but criticised Qismina's acting, writing that she "still has a long way to go". Chua also wrote that while Yunos "delivers" on the horror aspect of the film, it "would have been much better with more solid back stories and for the characters."

Shazryn Mohd Faizal of mStar Online wrote a mixed review of the film, criticising the budget and the script.
