= Sweet Qismina =

Malaysian actress

- Born: Farhanna Qismina Binti Supandi; 24 October 1997 (age 28); Kuala Lumpur, Malaysia
- Education: SEGI University
- Occupations: Actress, host, model, singer
- Years active: 2004–present
- Height: 5 ft 0 in (152 cm)
- Spouse: Adam Lee (m. 2022)

Farhanna "Sweet" Qismina Supandi, (Jawi: فرحانة قيسمينا سوڤندي) (born October 24, 1997) is a Malaysian actress. She is known for portraying Fasha in Hikayat Putera Syazlan and as Julie in Waktu Rehat.

== Filmography ==
=== Film ===
| Year | Title | Role | Notes |
|---|---|---|---|
| 2024 | Babah | Maya | |
| 2022 | Seratus | | Cameo appearance |
| 2021 | Kenderaan Berat Ikut Kiri | Lisa | |
| 2019 | Pusaka | Balqis / Qistina | |
| 2019 | Misi Penculikan Cinta | Lili | |
| 2018 | Rise: Ini Kalilah | | |
| 2017 | Aku Haus Darahmu | Ezza | |
| 2016 | Juvana 3: Perhitungan Terakhir | Midah | |
| 2015 | Juvana 2: Terperangkap Dalam Kebebasan | Midah | |
| 2014 | Manisnya Cinta Di Cappadoccia | | |
| 2013 | Tanda Putera | | |
| 2012 | Chantek | | |
| 2012 | Sesuatu Yang Tertinggal | Murni | |
| 2010 | Damping Malam | | |
| 2008 | Sepi | Young Imaan | |
| 2007 | German Homestay | | Film debut |

=== Drama ===
| Year | Title | Role | TV Station |
|---|---|---|---|
| 2020 | Bidadari Salju | Kayra | TV3 |
| 2020 | Pink Smile | Luna Aisya | TV3 |
| 2020 | Aku, Dia Dan Pinky Promise | Siti Saleha | TV Okey |
| 2019 | Adam Chempaka | Chempaka | TV3 |
| 2019 | Titian Takdir | Aisyah / Karina Jufri | TV3 |
| 2018 | Cinta Tiada Ganti | Rain | Maya HD |
| 2018 | Cinta Koko Coklat | Danisya | ntv7 |
| 2017 | Misteri Wan Peah | Nurin | TV3 |
| 2016 | Sayang Papa Saya Tak | Fatiya | Astro Ria |
| 2016 | Cinta Masam Manis | Hanna | TV3 |
| 2016 | Cinta Hati Abah | Zaharah | TV3 |
| 2014 | Super Game Boy | Kak Raihana | Astro Ceria |
| 2013 | E-Toyol.com | Atiqah | |
| 2013 | Dari Asar Ke Ishak | Atiqah | |
| 2013 | Karma Abah | | |
| 2013 | Nur Melinda | Murni | |
| 2011 | Khatan | Qamarina | |
| 2011 | Selamat Pagi Putera Puteri | | |
| 2011 | Elly dan Epit | Elly | Astro Ceria |
| 2010 | Papa Nak Kahwin? | | |
| 2010 | Waris 2 | Suki | TV2 |
| 2010 | Anak Rintih | | |
| 2010-2012 | Waktu Rehat | Julie | Disney Channel |
| 2009 | Jahil | Credited as the "Orphans" | |
| 2009 | Suara Hati | Murni | |
| 2009 | Raya Dua Benua | Aderina | |
| 2009 | Qana'ah | Alia | |
| 2009 | Hartamas | Young Aderina | |
| 2008 | Rebab Tidak Bertali | Farah | |
| 2008 | Cinta Batu Belah | Young Ara | |
| 2008 | Ku Milikmu | Young Anisa | TV3 |
| 2008 | Hikayat Putera Shazlan | Fasha | Astro Ceria |
| 2007 | Surat Kepada Tuhan | Alia | |
| 2007 | CD Kit | Li Ling | |
| 2007 | Udin dan Noni | Noni | |
| 2007 | Kasih Suci | Young Kasih | |
| 2007 | Manjalara | Young Manja | TV3 |

=== Theater ===
| Year | Title | Role |
|---|---|---|
| | Tun Tan Cheng Lock | |
| | Putra | |
| | Tun Sambathan | |
| | Laila Majunun | |
| 2012 | Ali Baba dan 40 Penyamun | |

=== Hosting ===
| Year | Title | Role | TV Station |
|---|---|---|---|
| 2017 | MEletop ( outdoor) | Host | Astro |
| 2017 | Chichi &Chacha | Host | TV3 |
| 2015 | Planet Bola | Host | TV3 |
| 2014 | TVIQ | Host | Astro TVIQ |
| 2013 | Kids On 2 | Host | TV2 |
| 2013 | ChiChi&ChaCha | Co-host with Harris Alif | Astro Ceria |
| 2013 | Ceria Superstar Backstage | Host | Astro Ceria |
| 2013 | 4 Teman | Host | |
| 2012 | Wazzup Ceria | Host | |

== Discography ==
Single
| Year | Title |
|---|---|
| 2022 | "Namo" |
| 2022 | "Tercipta" |
