= International Animation Day =

International observance honoring the art of animation

International Animation Day (IAD) is an international observance on October 28 that was proclaimed in 2002 by the ASIFA as the main global event to celebrate the art of animation.

== Background ==
This day commemorates the debut of Charles-Émile Reynaud's Théâtre Optique at the Musée Grévin in Paris in 1892. In 1895, the cinematograph of the Lumière brothers outshone Reynaud's invention, driving him to bankruptcy. However, his public exhibition of animation went down in the history of optical entertainment as barely predating live action films.

== Programs ==
In recent years, the event has been observed in more than 50 countries all over the world with more than 1,000 events on every continent except Antarctica. IAD was initiated by ASIFA (the International Animated Film Association), a member of UNESCO. During International Animation Day, cultural institutions are also invited to join in by screening animated films, organizing workshops, exhibiting artwork and stills, providing technical demonstrations, and organizing other events to help promote the art of animation. Such a celebration is an outstanding opportunity to put animated films in the limelight, making this art more accessible to the public.

ASIFA also commissions an artist to create an original art poster announcing the event each year. It is then adapted for each country in order to guarantee a worldwide view of the event. Previous editions involved the work of animators such as Iouri Tcherenkov, Paul Driessen, Abi Feijo, Eric Ledune, Noureddin Zarrinkelk, Michel Ocelot, Nina Paley, Raoul Servais, Ihab Shaker and Gianluigi Toccafondo.

Full-length animation films, historical features, animated shorts, and student films, all variety of animation art are shown in the workshops. These films display an extraordinary range of techniques – drawing, painting, animating puppets and objects, using clay, sand, paper, and computer. Since many animated films are non-verbal, it is a rich opportunity for cross-cultural expression and communication.

== See also ==
- History of animation
- Independent animation
- Arthouse animation
