= Mustapha Maarof =

Malaysian actor (1935–2014)

Dato' Mustapha Maarof DPTJ DSAP KMN AMN
- مصطفى معروف
- Born: Mustapha Azahari bin Maarof; 1 January 1935; Kuala Lumpur, Selangor, Federated Malay States, Malaya (now Malaysia)
- Died: 15 December 2014 (aged 79); Wangsa Maju, Kuala Lumpur, Malaysia
- Resting place: Jalan Ampang Muslim Cemetery, Kuala Lumpur
- Occupations: Actor, assistant director
- Years active: 1951–2014
- Spouses: Suraya Harun (m. 1962; div. 1965) Rosnah Jasni (Roseyatimah) (m. 1967; died 1987)
- Children: 4
- Parents: Maarof Zakaria (father); Kamsiah Mohd Ali (mother)

Dato' Mustapha Azahari bin Maarof (Jawi: مصطفى ازاهاري معروف; 1 January 1935 – 15 December 2014) was a Malaysian actor and assistant director. He appeared in Singapore's Hang Tuah (1956), Chermin (2007) and 1957: Hati Malaya (2007), among many other films. Maarof won the Veterans' Award presented at the 10th Malaysian Film Festival. He served on the board of National Film Development Corporation Malaysia, from which he received the Industry Icon Award in 2010. Maarof co-founded the charity arm of Persatuan Seniman Malaysia, a Malaysian artists' collective.

== Personal life ==
He was the son of Maarof Zakaria, lawyer and founder of Malay National Bank (Bank Kebangsaan Melayu). He was married twice, first to Suraya Harun from 1962 to 1965 and secondly to Rosnah Jasni, also known as Roseyatimah, from 1967 until her death on 14 December 1987.

Maarof died in December 15, 2014 at Wangsa Maju, Kuala Lumpur from respiratory failure at the age of 79, just before his 80th birthday on January 1, 2015.

He went to Malay College Kuala Kangsar.

== Filmography ==
=== Film ===
| Year | Title | Role | Notes |
|---|---|---|---|
| 1951 | Bunga Percintaan | | |
| 1953 | Untuk Sesuap Nasi | | |
| 1954 | Pertarohan | | |
| 1955 | Duka Nestapa | | |
| 1956 | Hang Tuah | Tun Zainal | |
| 1956 | Mega Mendung | | |
| 1956 | Dondang Sayang | | |
| 1957 | Pontianak | Samad | |
| 1957 | Salah Sangka | | |
| 1957 | Dendam Pontianak | Samad | |
| 1958 | Satay | — | As assistant director |
| 1958 | Sumpah Pontianak | Samad | |
| 1959 | Raden Mas | Tengku Bagus | |
| 1959 | Bawang Putih Bawang Merah | Putera Raja | |
| 1961 | Sri Mersing | Deli | |
| 1961 | Sultan Mahmud Mangkat Dijulang | Tun Aman | |
| 1961 | Yatim Mustapha | Tengku Persada | |
| 1961 | Tun Tijah | | |
| 1961 | Abu Nawas | Hassan Baki | |
| 1961 | Keris Sempena Riau | Tun Muda | |
| 1962 | Selendang Merah | Manja | |
| 1962 | Siti Payong | | |
| 1963 | Ibu Ayam | Rashid | |
| 1963 | Tangkap Basah | Desa | |
| 1963 | Fajar Menyinsing | Roslan | |
| 1963 | Anak Manja | Aziz | |
| 1965 | Mata dan Hati | | |
| 1966 | Udang Di Sebalik Batu | Badai | |
| 1966 | Naga Tasik Chini | Sultan Cahaya Putra Syah | |
| 1967 | Play Boy | Mustafa | |
| 1968 | Si Murai | Murai | |
| 1972 | Semangat Ular | | |
| 1975 | Paper Tiger | Marco | |
| 1980 | Detik 12 Malam | Doctor Mustaffa | |
| 1984 | Jasmin | | |
| 1984 | Matinya Seorang Patriot | Haji Shahban | |
| 1989 | Tuah | Datuk Shaari | |
| 1990 | Fenomena | Doctor | Cameo |
| 1992 | Abang 92 | Pak Long | |
| 1996 | Sutera Putih | Datuk Rahim | |
| 1998 | Iman Alone | Haji Shahidan | |
| 2001 | Putih | Raja Aristun Shah (voice) | Animated film |
| 2002 | Muhammad: The Last Prophet | (voice) | Malay dub, Animated film |
| 2007 | Chermin | Pak Din | |
| 2007 | 1957 Hati Malaya | Sultan Selangor | |
| 2009 | Lembing Awang Pulang Ke Dayang | Pak Ngah | |

=== Television series ===
| Year | Title | Role | TV channel | Notes |
|---|---|---|---|---|
| 2009 | Dua Marhalah | Mansoor | Astro Oasis | Special appearance |
| 2011 | Pak Kaduk | Datuk Kamil | TV2 | |

== Honours ==
=== Honours of Malaysia ===
- Malaysia :
  - Member of the Order of the Defender of the Realm (AMN) (1992)
  - Officer of the Order of the Defender of the Realm (KMN) (2003)
- Pahang :
  - Knight Companion of the Order of Sultan Ahmad Shah of Pahang (DSAP) – Dato' (2010)
- Negeri Sembilan :
  - Knight Commander of the Grand Order of Tuanku Jaafar (DPTJ) – Dato' (2003)
