= Christian Sugiono =

Indonesian actor and model (born 1981)

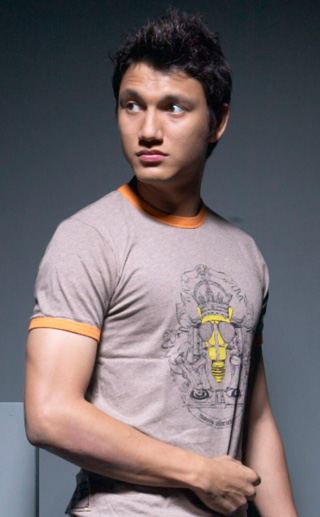
- Photo of Christian Sugiono
- Born: Christian Sugiono; 25 February 1981 (age 45); Jakarta, Indonesia
- Occupations: Actor; Model; Entrepreneur
- Years active: 1997–present
- Spouse: Titi Kamal (m. 2009)
- Children: Two sons

Christian Sugiono (born 25 February 1981) is an Indonesian actor and model.

== Early life ==
Sugiono was born and raised in Jakarta to a father of Javanese roots and a Dutch mother.

== Career ==
In 1997, Sugiono signed on to model for Hai Magazine. His work with Hai served as a catalyst, which increased his value in the entertainment industry. This work resulted in greater exposure to the fashion industry, including modelling on runways as well as appearing in print and film advertising.

=== MTV Indonesia ===
In 2000, Sugiono left Indonesia for six years to study in Hamburg, Germany. He attended the Hamburg University of Technology, majoring in IT studies, only to drop out in 2006 to pursue entertainment as he returned to Indonesia. Sugiono gained skills and knowledge in web design, having successfully developed his own website, which presents his professional background, skills, and abilities.

While on hiatus in the entertainment industry, Sugiono continued his work in web design and computer programming, working from a web production studio in his home. He also plays the piano, guitar, bass, and drums.

Following his college education, Sugiono returned to Jakarta to focus on his acting and modelling career. He successfully merged his knowledge in computer technology with his professional interests in the entertainment industry by developing websites and writing articles as well as reviews of concerts and music festivals held throughout Europe during the summer. Sugiono has contributed to Trax Magazine for MTV Indonesia. After Sugiono returned from Hamburg, he began working in a number of roles in telefilms and soap operas.

=== 2005–2008 ===
Sugiono made his acting debut in the 2005 film Catatan Akhir Sekolah as the film's antagonist, Ray. Written by Salman Aristo and directed by Hanung Bramantyo, this film received the award for Best Film in Indonesian Film Festival. It was also nominated for Best Director and Best Movie in MTV Indonesia Movie Awards. Sugiono went on to star in Jomblo and Cinta Silver.

Sugiono became a brand ambassador representing Close-Up in 2006. Two years later, in 2008, he became a brand ambassador of Hewlett Packard and Gatsby hair products for men, the latter of which is manufactured by the Mandom Corporation in Indonesia. His popularity increased after playing the role of Doni in Jomblo (2006). The film was honoured as the Best Movie at the MTV Indonesia Movie Awards. Following its success, a television series of the same name was created to continue the story on a regular basis. Sugiono learned to sing and play the bass guitar for his appearance in the 2006 film Dunia Mereka. He was praised for his work on this film and earned Best Actor award in the Bandung Film Festival Awards. That same year, Sugiono appeared in the Lux short film with Dian Sastrowardoyo in (Bukan) Kesempatan yang Terlewat. This film, screened in the Busan International Film Festival (PIFF) 2007 in South Korea, tells a story about a young woman who repeatedly encounters an attractive young man whenever she goes by train. Later that year, Sugiono also appeared in the cat-and-mouse thriller film Jakarta Undercover, based on a novel by Moammar Emka.

In 2008, Sugiono starred in the Malaysian film Tipu Kanan Tipu Kiri as Rudy. Directed by Indian filmmaker Sharad Sharan, the romantic comedy was shot in 45 days during February and March around the Klang Valley. The production crew and supporting cast included principles from the established Bollywood film community, as well as individuals from throughout India, Malaysia, and Indonesia. The film was released to venues in Indonesia, Malaysia, Brunei, Singapore and India.

== Personal life ==
On 26 February 2009, Sugiono officially announced to the public that he had married Titi Kamal in Australia on 6 February. It was reported that Sugiono converted from Catholicism to Islam in mid-2008, but he claims to remain a Roman Catholic.

== Filmography ==
=== Television appearances ===
- 2010: Dia Jantung Hatiku (telefilm)
- 2010: Amanah dalam Cinta (telefilm)
- 2008: Alisa (soap opera)
- 2007: Kasih (soap opera)
- 2007: Ratu (soap opera)
- 2007: Mukjizat Itu Nyata (telefilm)
- 2007: Gantung – Melly Goeslaw (short film)
- 2006: Mengejar Cinta (telefilm)
- 2006: Dunia Maya (telefilm)
- 2006: Foto Kotak dan Jendela
- 2006: Pengantin Remaja (soap opera)
- 2006: Dunia Tanpa Koma (telefilm)
- 2006: Jomblo (television series)
- 2004: Arti Cinta – Ari Lasso (short)

=== Film appearances ===
Year	Title	Role	Notes
2005	Catatan Akhir Sekolah		
2005	Cinta Silver	Vishnu	
2006	Jomblo		
2006	(Bukan) Kesempatan Yang Terlewat		
2006	Foto Kotak dan Jendela		
2006	Dunia Mereka		
2007	Jakarta Undercover		
2008	Tipu Kanan Tipu Kiri	Rudy Affendi	
2008	Saus Kacang		
2009	Rasa		
