= D. J. Conway =

American novelist (1939–2019)

Deanna "D. J." Conway (May 3, 1939 – February 1, 2019) was a non-fiction author of books in the field of magic, Wicca, Druidism, shamanism, metaphysics and the occult, and the author of several fantasy novels. Born in Hood River, Oregon to a family of Irish, North Germanic, and Native North American descent, she studied the occult and Pagan religion for over thirty years. In 1998 she was voted Best Wiccan and New Age author by Silver Chalice, a neo-pagan magazine. She was an ordained minister in two New Age churches, and holder of a Doctor of Divinity degree. Several of her stories were published in magazines, such as the science fantasy publication Encounters, and she was interviewed in magazines and appeared on such television shows as Journey with Brenda Roberts. She also designed tarot decks, in collaboration with fellow author Sirona Knight and illustrator Lisa Hunt.

== Bibliography ==
=== Non-fiction ===
- Celtic Magic (1990) Llewellyn Worldwide Ltd ISBN 0-87542-136-9, ISBN 978-0-87542-136-0
- Norse Magick (1990) Llewellyn Publications ISBN 0-87542-137-7, ISBN 978-0-87542-137-7
- Dancing with Dragons: Invoke Their Ageless Wisdom and Power (1994) Llewellyn Publications ISBN 1-56718-165-1, ISBN 978-1-56718-165-4
- The Ancient and Shining Ones (1995) Llewellyn Publications ISBN 0-87542-170-9, ISBN 978-0-87542-170-4
- Animal Magick: The Art of Recognizing and Working with Familiars (1995) Llewellyn Worldwide Ltd ISBN 1567181686, ISBN 978-1-56718-168-5
- Maiden, Mother, Crone: The Myth & Reality of the Triple Goddess (1995) Llewellyn Publications ISBN 0-87542-171-7, ISBN 978-0-87542-171-1
- Astral Love: Romance, Ecstasy & Higher Consciousness (Llewellyn's Tantra & Sexual Arts Series) (1995) Llewellyn Publications ISBN 1-56718-161-9, ISBN 978-1-56718-161-6
- Falcon Feather & Valkyrie Sword: Feminine Shamanism, Witchcraft & Magick (1996) Llewellyn Publications ISBN 1-56718-163-5, ISBN 978-1-56718-163-0
- Magickal, Mythical, Mystical Beasts: How to Invite Them Into Your Life (1996) Llewellyn Publications ISBN 1-56718-176-7, ISBN 978-1-56718-176-0
- Lord of Light and Shadow: The Many Faces of the God (1997) Llewellyn Publications ISBN 1-56718-177-5, ISBN 978-1-56718-177-7
- Magick of the Gods and Goddesses: How to Invoke Their Powers (1997) Llewellyn Publications ISBN 1-56718-179-1, ISBN 978-1-56718-179-1
- The Mysterious, Magickal Cat: The Magick of Claw & Whisker (1998) Llewellyn Publications ISBN 1-56718-180-5, ISBN 978-1-56718-180-7
- Perfect Love: Finding Intimacy on the Astral Plane (1998) Llewellyn Publications ISBN 1-56718-181-3, ISBN 978-1-56718-181-4
- The Celtic Dragon Tarot (1999) Llewellyn Publications ISBN 1-56718-182-1, ISBN 978-1-56718-182-1
- Crystal Enchantments: A Complete Guide to Stones (1999) Crossing Press ISBN 1-58091-010-6, ISBN 978-1-58091-010-1
- Laying On Of Stones (1999) Crossing Press ISBN 1-58091-029-7, ISBN 978-1-58091-029-3
- Advanced Celtic Shamanism (2000) Crossing Press ISBN 1-58091-073-4, ISBN 978-1-58091-073-6
- The Celtic Book of Names: Traditional Names From Ireland, Scotland and Wales (2000) Citadel ISBN 0-8065-2096-5, ISBN 978-0-8065-2096-4
- A Little Book of Candle Magic (2000) Crossing Press ISBN 1-58091-043-2, ISBN 978-1-58091-043-9
- Feminine Shamanism, Witchcraft and Magick: Invoking Woman's Power with Kimberly Nightingale (2000) Llewellyn ISBN 1-56718-158-9, ISBN 1-56718-158-9 (2000)
- The Little Book of Pendulum Magic (2000) Crossing Press ISBN 978-1-58091-093-4, ISBN 1-58091-093-9
- Wicca: The Complete Craft (2001) Crossing Press ISBN 1-58091-092-0, ISBN 978-1-58091-092-7
- A Little Book of Altar Magic (2001) Crossing Press ISBN 1-58091-052-1, ISBN 978-1-58091-052-1
- Magickal Mystical Creatures: Invite Their Powers Into Your Life (2001) Llewellyn Publications ISBN 1-56718-149-X, ISBN 978-1-56718-149-4
- A Little Book of Healing Magic (2002) Crossing Press ISBN 978-1-58091-146-7, ISBN 1-58091-146-3
- Flying Without a Broom: Astral Projection & the Astral World (2002) Llewellyn Publications ISBN 1-56718-164-3, ISBN 978-1-56718-164-7
- Moon Magick: Myth & Magic, Crafts & Recipes, Rituals & Spells (2002) Llewellyn Publications ISBN 1-56718-167-8, ISBN 978-1-56718-167-8
- By Oak, Ash & Thorn: Modern Celtic Shamanism (2002) Llewellyn Publications ISBN 1-56718-166-X, ISBN 978-1-56718-166-1
- Magickal Mermaids and Water Creatures (2004) New Page Books ISBN 1-56414-784-3, ISBN 978-1-56414-784-4
- Elemental Magick: Meditations, Exercises, Spells And Rituals to Help You Connect With Nature (2005) New Page Books ISBN 1-56414-833-5, ISBN 978-1-56414-833-9
- The Ancient Art of Faery Magick (2005) Crossing Press ISBN 1-58091-157-9, ISBN 978-1-58091-157-3
- The Fantastical Creatures Tarot (2007) U.S. Games Systems ISBN 1-57281-541-8, ISBN 978-1-57281-541-4
- Mystical Dragon Magic: Teachings of the Five Inner Rings (2007) Llewellyn Publications ISBN 0-7387-1099-7, ISBN 978-0-7387-1099-0
- Guides, Guardians and Angels (2009) Llewellyn ISBN 978-0-7387-1124-9

Standing on the Edge (true story of NDE with her husband) (2013) ebook or print on demand on Amazon.

=== Fiction ===
- The Dream Warrior (Book I of the Dream Warrior Trilogy) (1997) Llewellyn Publications ISBN 1-56718-162-7, ISBN 978-1-56718-162-3
- Soothslayer: A Magical Fantasy (Book II of the Dream Warrior Trilogy) (1997) Llewellyn Publications ISBN 1-56718-162-7, ISBN 978-1-56718-162-3
- Warrior of Shadows: The Final Battle (Book III of The Dream Warrior Trilogy) (2002) Llewellyn Publications ISBN 1-56718-178-3, ISBN 978-1-56718-178-4
- The Broken Spell: (2013) CreateSpace Independent Publishing Platform ISBN 1-48954-861-0, ISBN 978-1-48954-861-0

=== Tarot Decks ===
- Celtic Dragon Tarot - D.J. Conway & Lisa Hunt: Llewellyn Publications (October 1, 1999)
- Shapeshifter Tarot - D.J. Conway, Sirona Knight & Lisa Hunt: Llewellyn Publications (September 1, 2002) ISBN 1-56718-384-0, ISBN 978-1-56718-384-9
