= Deanna M. Mulligan =

American businesswoman

- Born: 1958 or 1959 (age 66–67)
- Education: University of Nebraska–Lincoln; Stanford Graduate School of Business
- Known for: CEO, The Guardian Life Insurance Company of America

Deanna M. Mulligan (born 1963) was the president and CEO of The Guardian Life Insurance Company of America, a Fortune 300 company, and one of the largest mutual life insurance companies in the US.

== Biography ==
She received a B.S. degree in Business Administration from the University of Nebraska–Lincoln and an M.B.A. from the Stanford Graduate School of Business. She was the owner and operator of an insurance company consulting firm prior to working at Guardian.

Mulligan started working at Guardian in 2008 as the Executive Vice President of the Individual Life and Disability department. Her work in this capacity was responsible for the company's growth in that sector. She was also in charge of leading Guardian's Berkshire Life Insurance Company during that time.

Mulligan was CEO of Guardian Life from July 2011 until October 2020. She was made director of Guardian in 2013.

== Recognition ==
In 2012, Mulligan was awarded the Israel Bonds Neil Levin Memorial Award for "professional accomplishments in support of Israel." In 2014, she was appointed by the White House to the President's Advisory Council on Financial Capability for Young Americans.
