= Deanna Manfredi =

American psychologist

Deanna Manfredi is an American psychologist, professional medical moderator, consultant to the pharmaceutical and healthcare industries, and owner and breeder of thoroughbred racehorses. She is the owner and director of Manfredi Consulting.

She is also the managing partner of Ascoli Piceno Stables, LLC, a vertically integrated thoroughbred breed-to-race operation with approximately 40 horses under management, including broodmares, foals, weanlings, yearlings, horses in training and pensioners.

== Early years ==
Manfredi grew up on horse farm in Toughkenamon, Pennsylvania. Her early childhood was filled with animals of all varieties instilling an early interest in evolutionary biology, animal cognition, and animal welfare. Inspired by her father, a racehorse breeder and trainer, she developed a lifelong affinity for thoroughbred racehorses and horse racing.

== Education ==
Manfredi received her B.A. with a double major in psychology and Spanish from Franklin & Marshall College in 1990.

After earning her undergraduate degree, she enrolled in a doctoral psychology program at Princeton University where she received her M.A. in Cognitive Psychology in 1992 and her Ph.D. in 1994.

== Thoroughbred racing ==
Manfredi comes from a family of racing enthusiasts but it was her victory on a reality television show in 2005 that kick-started her own career in the thoroughbred industry. In 2004, she was cast as one of 12 contestants on GSN's original series "American Dream Derby". Deanna went on to win the reality competition in February 2005 and her prizes included $250,000 and a stable of 8 racehorses. She brought the horses home to her farm in Kennett Square, Pennsylvania in March of that year and established Ascoli Piceno Stables, LLC. In May 2025, Manfredi became the first female President of the Pennsylvania Horse Breeders Association.

== Publications ==
- Glucksberg S, Manfredi DA (1995). Metaphoric comparisons. In C. Cacciari, D. Gentner & S. Glucksberg (Eds.), Similarity in language, thought and perception. New York, NY: Brepols Publishers.
- Glucksberg S, Manfredi DA, McGlone MS (1997). Metaphor comprehension: How metaphors create new categories. In T.B. Ward, S.M. Smith & J. Vaid (Eds.), Creative thought: An investigation of conceptual structures and processes, (pp. 327–350). Washington, DC: American Psychological Association.
- Glucksberg S, McGlone MS, Manfredi DA (1997). "Property attribution in metaphor comprehension". Journal of Memory and Language. 36: 50–67. doi:10.1006/jmla.1996.2479.
- McGlone MS, Manfredi DA (December 2001). "Topic-vehicle interaction in metaphor comprehension". Memory & Cognition. 29 (8): 1209–19. doi:10.3758/bf03206390. PMID 11913757.
- Manfredi DA (2010). "My Favorite Day in Philadelphia". QRCA Views, Summer 2010, vol. 8, no. 4, 65–66.
- Manfredi DA (2013). Applying Behavioral Economics Theory to Uncover the Truth: Why You Can't Simply Ask "Why?", QRCA Views, Summer 2013, vol. 11, no. 4, 12–19.
- Manfredi DA (2013). Behavioral Economics In Action: Techniques for Creating Behavioral Change, http://www.greenbook.org/marketing-research.cfm/behavioral-economics-in-action-techniques-for-creating-behavioral-change-35051
- Manfredi DA (2014). Behavioral Economics in Action: Laying the Groundwork for New Behaviors, QRCA Views, Spring 2014, vol. 12, no. 3, 40–46.
