= Deanna Yusoff =

Malaysian actress

- Born: 3 January 1967 (age 59); London, United Kingdom
- Occupations: Actor, host, singer, model, lyricist, businessman, racing driver
- Years active: 1990–present

Deanna Yusoff (born 3 January 1967) is a Swiss Malaysian actress, best known for her roles in the television series Idaman, Spanar Jaya and the films Selubung, Abang 92, Ringgit Kasorrga, Anna and the King, Chermin, CEO, 1965 and Aku Haus Darahmu.

== Early life ==
Yusoff was born on 3 January 1967 in London to Malay father and Swiss mother.

== Career ==
Her breakthrough role was in the 1992 film Selubung, which she starred in. She then starred in the films Abang 92 and Ringgit Kasorrga. She starred in the television series Idaman (TV Series), which aired from 1998 to 2001. She also starred in seasons 3 to 7 of the television series Spanar Jaya.

She appeared in the 1996 Singaporean film Army Daze and the 1999 American film Anna and the King. She starred in the 2007 horror film Chermin.

She starred in the 2014 film CEO (film) and in the 2015 Singaporean historical thriller film 1965. In 2017, she starred in the horror film Aku Haus Darahmu.

== Filmography ==
=== Film ===
- Selubung (1992) as Mastura
- Abang 92 (1992) as Farah Hanum
- Ringgit Kasorrga (1995)
- Army Daze (1996) as herself
- Return To Paradise (1998) as Woman in Bar
- Anna and the King (1999) as Queen
- Chermin (2007) as Mastura (also singer OST)
- Bola Kampung: The Movie (2013)
- CEO (2014) as Zara
- 1965 (2015) as Khatijah
- Aku Haus Darahmu (2017)

=== Television ===
- Arshad Hussein & Co (1994)
- Dunia Rees dan Ina (1995)
- Shiver (1997)
- Idaman (1998–2001)
- Un homme en colère (1999)
- Cemas (2000)
- Passeur d'enfants (2000)
- Spanar Jaya (2002–2005) as Claudia
- Stories of Love: The Anthology Series (2006)
- Random Acts (2007)
- Legend (2017)
