= Deanna Morse =

American experimental filmmaker

- Born: February 26, 1950 (age 76); Sioux City, Iowa, U.S.
- Known for: Animation

Deanna Morse is an independent American experimental filmmaker and media artist. Her work is included in collections at the Metropolitan Museum of Art.

For the period of 2022–2024, she is president of the International Animated Film Association. She has been a member of the Academy of Motion Picture Arts and Sciences since 2020.

== Early life and education ==
Morse graduated from Iowa State University with a degree in telecommunicative arts and distributed studies in 1972. She received an M.A. in film and teaching at Goddard College, and in 1992 received a Master of Fine Arts (art and technology), with a merit scholarship from the School of the Art Institute of Chicago. In 1995, she was awarded an outstanding alumni award by Iowa State University.

== Career ==
After graduation she became an assistant editor at WGBH-TV in Boston, and also worked as a scriptwriter for the Virginia Department of Education, and on a series about desegregation for Virginia PBS. She was then hired as an artist in residence for the South Carolina Arts, where she taught for four years, and was filmmaker-in-schools in 1975–1976.

She taught at the College of Charleston, at Regis College, and then at Grand Valley State University in Allendale, Michigan, for thirty-three years, retiring as an Emerita Professor in 2013. During her time at GVSU, she released the retrospective and interactive DVD Move Click Move in 2001 and used the proceeds to fund scholarships. There she also created, together with some of her students, a Flash animation for the international participatory project Flag Metamorphoses.

Her film Lost Ground was part of the 1992 SIGGRAPH Art Show. She was chair of the SIGGRAPH 1994 Art and Design Show, and a juror for the art show in 1998.

She has judged festivals and computer graphics competitions including the Hiroshima International Animation Festival in Japan and the Ann Arbor Film Festival.

She has published articles in Animation World Network.

== Filmography ==
She has made several films for Sesame Street, including Dogs (1991), Monkey's T-Shirt (1991), and Night Sounds (1992).

Hyperallergic wrote about her 1989 animated film Plants that "The play of light, color, line, and shape can be mesmerizing ... vegetal patterns move and spin to evoke plants". Plants was also reviewed by the Chicago Reader, which noted that she " ... creates still-life portraits of flowers using rudimentary (but then-sophisticated) computer drawing tools".

Year	Film	Format
2017	Clear, Deep, Quiet	Video installation
2015	Angels in Maui	DVD
2015	Bird Dreams	DVD
2014	Animation Collaboration	DVD
2014	Perch	DVD
2013	Mindful	DVD
2013	Whispers of the Prairie	DVD
2013	This present moment	DVD
2012	Skin	DVD
2012	Kindred	DVD
2012	Skies of Mist	DVD
2011	Wish you were here	DVD
2010	Traces of Light	DVD
2009	Breathing Room	Video installation
2009	Ancient Woodland	DVD
2007	Forced Perspective: Odessa	DVD
2007	Time Flights	Video installation
2007	Postcards from my backyard	DVD
2002	Kitchen Creature Feature	Film
2001	Move Click Move: a DVD Compilation	DVD
2000	A Mother's Advice	Film
1993	Digital Aquarium	Video installation
1992	Lost ground	Computer animation
1992	Sandpaintings	Film
1991	Self Portrait: Artist With Pets	Film
1991	Dogs	Film
1991	Night Sounds: Imagination	Film
1991	From The Sand	Video installation
1990	The A.M. Dream	Computer animation
1990	Monkey's T-Shirt	Film
1989	Plants	Film
1991	Artist In The Schools	Film
1988	Main Street M	Film
1987	The Lumberyard	Film
1985	August Afternoons	Film
1984	Camera People	Film
1982	Hand	Film
1981	Reality Check	Film
1981	Recycle	Film
1981	Help!...I'm Stranded...	Film
1980	Charleston Home Movie	Film
1978	Starcycle	Film
1978	Jimmy Brown The Newsboy	Film
1978	Ranky Tanky	Film
1978	Cats At The Door	Film
1975	The Midnight Dance	Film
1972	Marriages	Film
1972	Dejeunez, Mon Amour	Film

== Awards ==
- 1993 - Named a distinguished professor by the Michigan Association of Governing Boards of State Universities.
- 1995 - Outstanding Alumni Award from Iowa State University
- 2002 - Addy Award for Move Click Move DVD
- 2003 - Omni Award for Move Click Move DVD
- 2005 - Selected as an outstanding woman in the arts by the YWCA
- 2015 - Hyperion Award, 9th Eclipse Awards honoring Michigan's filmmakers and television creators
- Honored in the Plaza of Heroines at Carrie Chapman Catt Hall at Iowa State University.
