= Deanna Jo =

Alameda Fire Department fireboat in the US

The Deanna Jo is a small fireboat operated by the Alameda Fire Department. The city was able to acquire the vessel with the help of matching grants from the United States Department of Homeland Security, which required the city to only pay one quarter of the vessels capital cost. The Department has been providing Port Security grants since 2002, to provide vessels that, in addition to fighting fires, and rescuing boaters and swimmers, are equipped to counter biological and chemical weapons.

The 32 feet (9.8 m) vessel is staffed by a three-person crew. She is equipped with night-vision equipment. Her pump can throw a relatively modest 2,000 gallons per minute. Like most other fireboats, her pump can be provide water to fire engines near shore, when an earthquake, or another disaster, has broken near shore water mains.

The vessel is named after Deanna Johe, an administrative worker with the Department, who was about to retire with 27 years of seniority. She was christened on February 18, 2014.

The Fire Department had already called upon the vessel several times, prior to her christening.

Alameda had operated a less capable small fireboat, until it provided it to the city of Santa Cruz, California, in February 2012. That vessel could pump 500 gallons per minute.

In 2001 the Fire Department had commissioned a vessel named the Big Jim LeMoine, an older style fireboat, with an open cockpit, not well suited to countering chemical threats. In September, 2012, when the Deanna Jo was ordered, Action Alameda News reported that Alameda had recently relied on San Francisco's Phoenix because Alameda's existing fireboat equipment had been out of commission since 2008.
