= International Animated Film Association =

Voluntary association

- Association Internationale du Film d'Animation
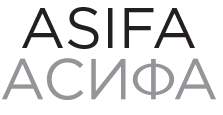
- Formation: January 1, 1961; 65 years ago
- Founded at: Annecy, France
- Type: Nonprofit
- VAT ID no.: FR70442730685
- Registration no.: 442730685
- Headquarters: 331 Route D'Albertville 74320 Sevrier
- President: Deanna Morse
- Website: asifa.net

The International Animated Film Association (French: Association Internationale du Film d'Animation, ASIFA) is an international non-profit organization founded in 1960. ASIFA's purpose is to cultivate and promote the art of animation. Its founders include well-known animation artists such as Canadian animator Norman McLaren. There are now more than 30 chapters of the Association located in many countries of the world. Its Japanese chapter, ASIFA-Japan, was established in 1981 by Renzō Kinoshita, Yōji Kuri, Taiji Yabushita, Osamu Tezuka, and 18 other founding members, and co-organized the Hiroshima International Animation Festival from 1985 to 2020.

ASIFA's board of directors includes animation professionals from all over the world. They meet at ASIFA-sponsored animation film festivals on a regular basis. Some of the most well-known festivals include the Annecy International Animated Film Festival in France, the Ottawa International Animated Film Festival in Canada, the Animae Caribe in the Caribbean, the Hiroshima International Animation Festival in Japan, and the Zagreb World Festival of Animated Films in Croatia. The annual Annie Awards are presented by the Hollywood branch of the International Animated Film Association (ASIFA-Hollywood).

== Presidents ==
President	Term	Refs.
Norman McLaren	1960–1979	
John Halas	1979–1988	
Raoul Servais	1985–1994 or 1988–1993	
Michel Ocelot	1994–1999	
Abi Feijò	1999–2002	
Thomas Renoldner	2002–2004	
Noureddin Zarrinkelk	2004–2006	
Sayoko Kinoshita	2006–2009	
Nelson Shin	2009–2012	
Ed Desroches	2013–2015	
Ed Desroches	2015–2019	
Sayoko Kinoshita	2019–2022	
Deanna Morse	2022–2024	

== See also ==
- International Animation Day
- ASIFA-Hollywood
