= Deanna Gumpf =

American college softball coach

Biographical details
- Born: La Palma, California, U.S.
- Education: Nebraska

Playing career
- 1989–1992: Nebraska

Coaching career (HC unless noted)
- 1996–1997: Long Beach State (asst.)
- 1998–2001: Notre Dame (asst.)
- 2002–2024: Notre Dame

Head coaching record
- Overall: 855–369–2 (.698)

Accomplishments and honors

Championships
- 7× Big East Conference Regular Season Champions (2002–2005, 2010, 2011, 2013); 4× Big East Tournament Champions (2002, 2003, 2006, 2009)

Awards
- 5× NFCA Regional Coaching Staff of the Year (2002, 2004, 2014, 2016, 2017) 4× Big East Coaching Staff of the Year (2002, 2004, 2011, 2013); 2014 Alliance of Women's Coaches Bigger Picture Award 2014 NFCA Donna Newberry Perseverance Award

Deanna Gumpf is an American softball coach who is the former head coach at Notre Dame.

== Early life and education ==
Gumpf was born in La Palma, California. She attended the University of Nebraska–Lincoln where she studied business management while being a member of the softball team.

== Coaching career ==
=== Notre Dame ===
Gumpf had been the head coach for Notre Dame since the 2002 softball season. She has led Notre Dame to 21 consecutive NCAA regional appearances. She is the all-time winningest softball coach in Notre Dame softball history. She is one of two coaches in Notre Dame athletics history to win more than 750 games as the leader of their program. On May 23, 2024, Gumpf retired as head coach of the Irish after 23 seasons.

== Personal life ==
Gumpf lives with her husband John and two children Brady and Tatum. John was selected by the Minnesota Twins in the second round of the 1989 Major League Baseball draft and was on the softball coaching staff with Deanna at Notre Dame before joining the Notre Dame baseball staff. Brady also played baseball for Notre Dame.

== Head coaching record ==
=== College ===
Record table
Season	Team	Overall	Conference	Standing	Postseason
Notre Dame Fighting Irish (Big East Conference) (2002–2013)
2002	Notre Dame	44–17	18–2	1st	NCAA Regional
2003	Notre Dame	38–17	14–3	1st	NCAA Regional
2004	Notre Dame	49–20	18–2	1st	NCAA Regional
2005	Notre Dame	46–15	16–2	1st	NCAA Regional
2006	Notre Dame	42–21	17–5	3rd	NCAA Regional
2007	Notre Dame	32–24	13–7	4th	NCAA Regional
2008	Notre Dame	38–22–1	14–8	4th	NCAA Regional
2009	Notre Dame	43–17	19–4	2nd	NCAA Regional
2010	Notre Dame	47–12	18–3	T-1st	NCAA Regional
2011	Notre Dame	46–11	19–1	1st	NCAA Regional
2012	Notre Dame	40–16	16–3	2nd	NCAA Regional
2013	Notre Dame	43–15	19–3	1st	NCAA Regional
Notre Dame Fighting Irish (Atlantic Coast Conference) (2014–2024)
2014	Notre Dame	41–13	16–5	2nd	NCAA Regional
2015	Notre Dame	42–15	17–6	3rd	NCAA Regional
2016	Notre Dame	43–13	13–7	3rd	NCAA Regional
2017	Notre Dame	34–23	13–11	5th	NCAA Regional
2018	Notre Dame	34–23	13–10	3rd (Atlantic)	NCAA Regional
2019	Notre Dame	37–18	18–6	2nd (Atlantic)	NCAA Regional
2020	Notre Dame	13–9	2–4	T-7th	Season canceled due to COVID-19
2021	Notre Dame	33-15	20-10	5th	NCAA Regional
2022	Notre Dame	40-12	16-5	4th	NCAA Regional
2023	Notre Dame	30-19-1	11-12-1	7th	NCAA Regional
2024	Notre Dame	27-23	9-15	T–8th	
Notre Dame:		882–392–2 (.692)	344–138 (.714)		
Total:		882–392–2 (.692)			
National champion Postseason invitational champion Conference regular season champion Conference regular season and conference tournament champion Division regular season champion Division regular season and conference tournament champion Conference tournament champion
