= Deanna Sirlin =

American contemporary artist (born 1958)

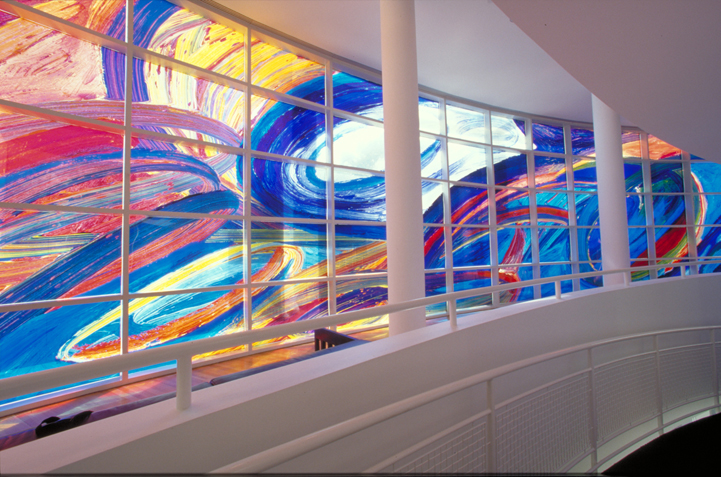
- High Museum Of Art "Retracings"
- Born: 1958 (age 67–68); Brooklyn, New York
- Education: Brooklyn Museum Art School; State University of New York at Albany; Queens College; City University of New York
- Known for: included in the High Museum of Arts permanent collection
- Style: Contemporary

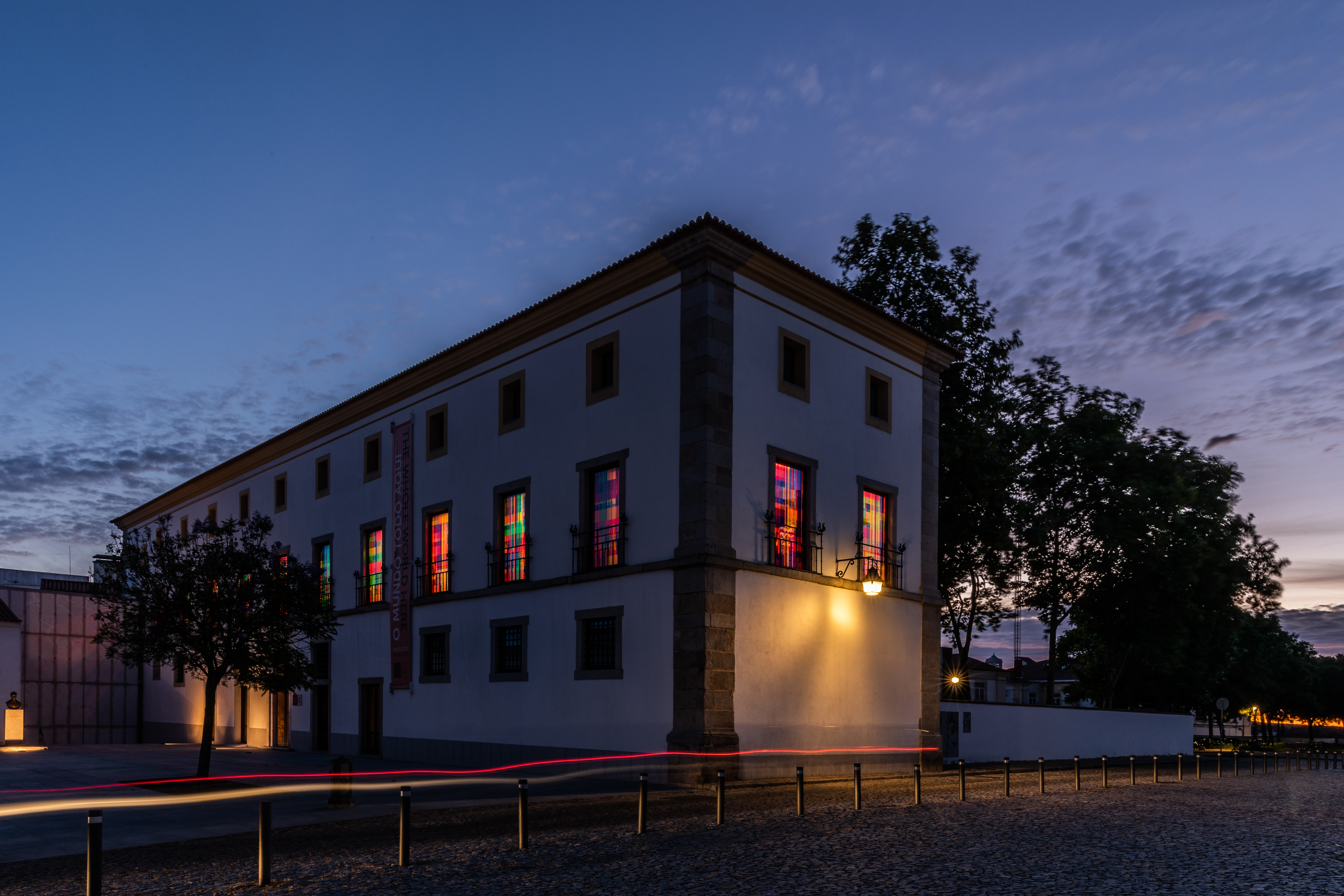
Deanna Sirlin: Strata at the Eugénio de Almeida Foundation in Évora, Portugal

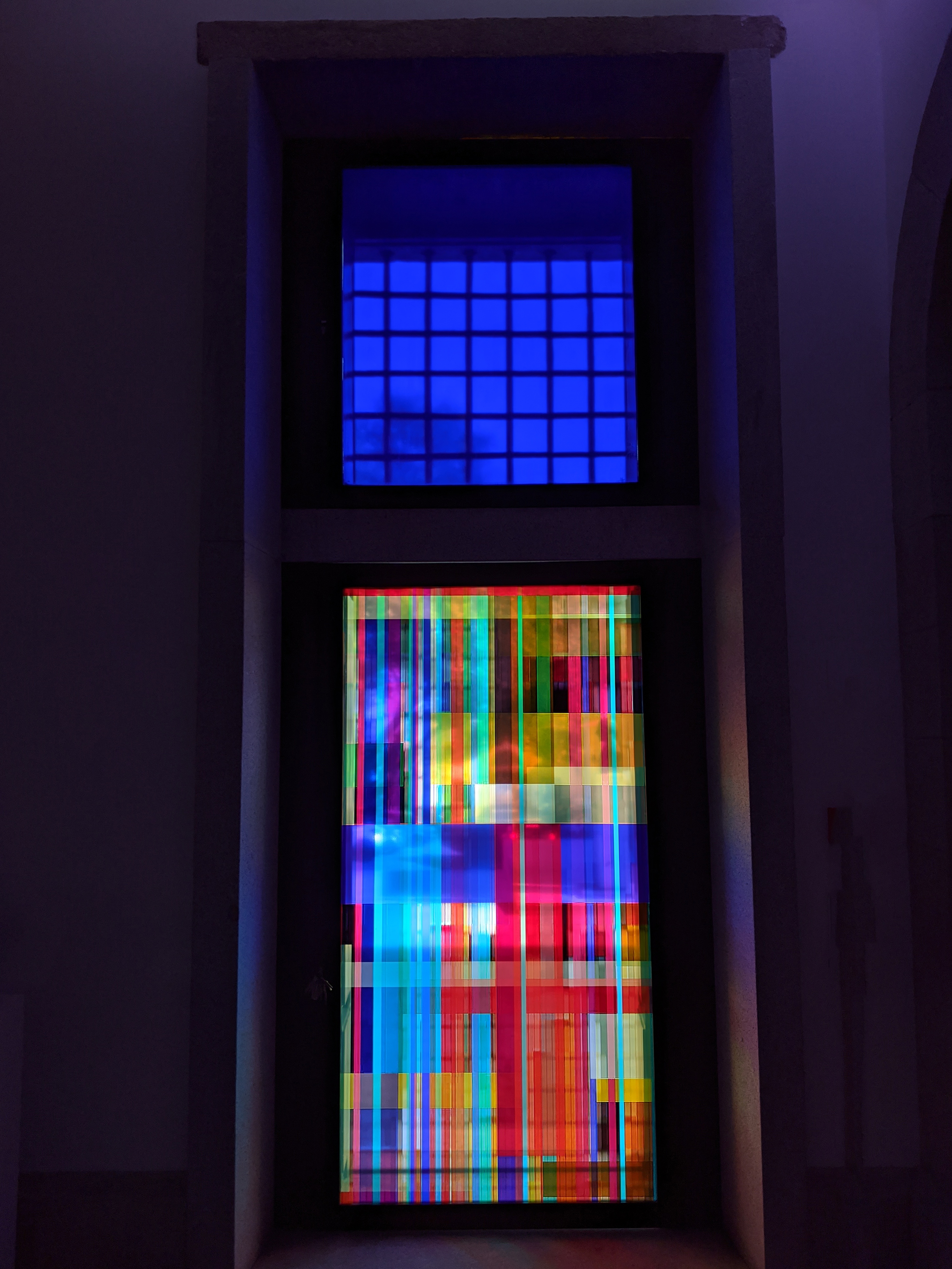
Sirlin: STRATA at the entrance to the Centro de Arte e Cultura - Fundação Eugénio de Almeida in Évora, Portugal.

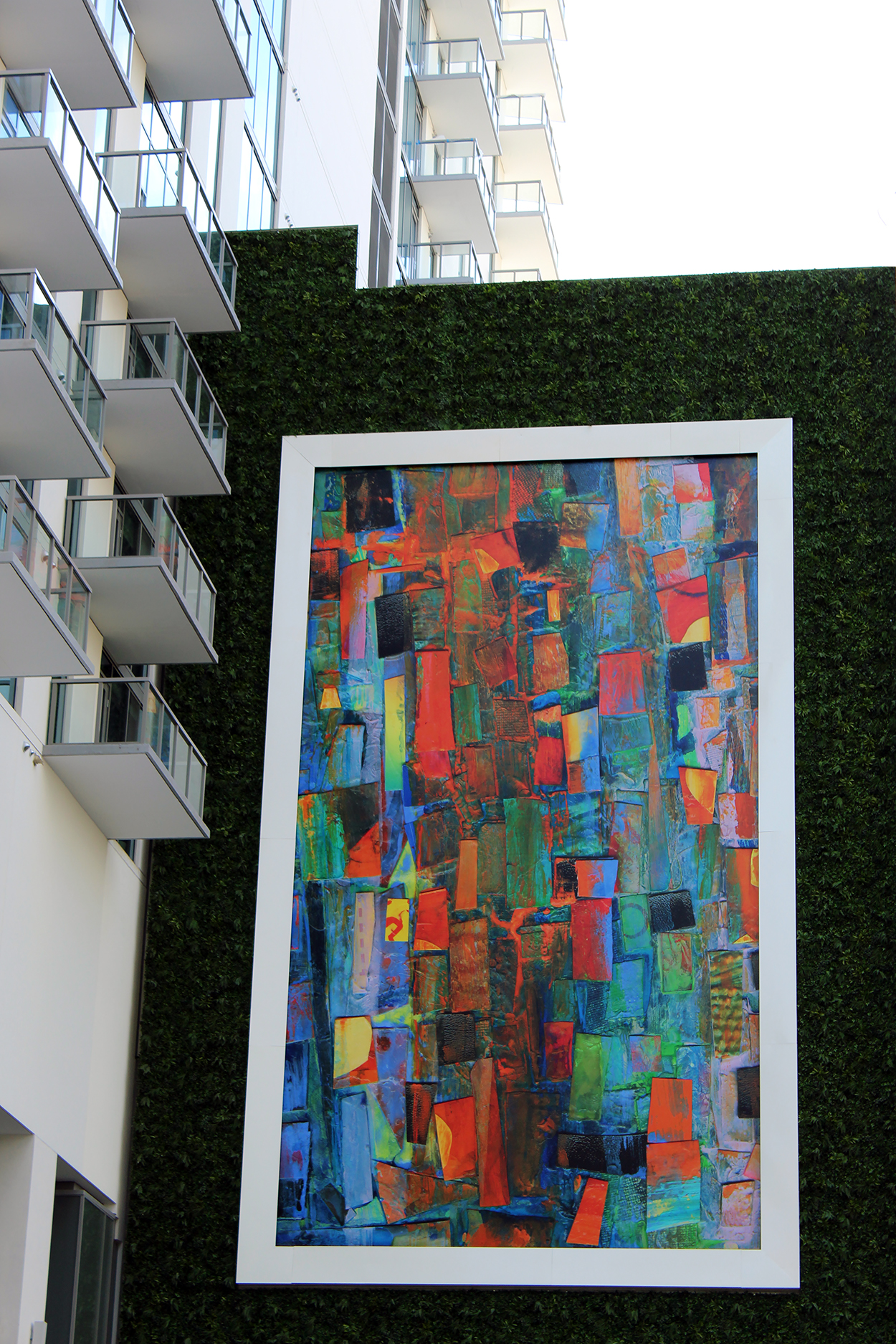
Deanna Sirlin, The Distance Between, 2019, 50 x 30 feet, Atlanta, Georgia

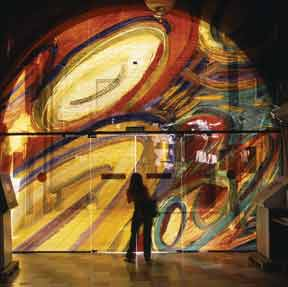
Venice, Italy 2001

Deanna Sirlin (born 1958) is an American contemporary artist best known for her large-scale installations and paintings.

== Education ==
Born in Brooklyn, New York, Sirlin earned a BA in Art from the State University of New York at Albany (1978). Sirlin earned an MFA in Painting from Queens College, City University of New York (1980).

== Installations ==
Sirlin is perhaps best known for her pivotal installation "Retracings," which encompassed virtually the entire glass front of Atlanta's High Museum of Art in 1999. She is included in the High Museum of Arts permanent collection.

== Writing ==
Sirlin is the editor-in-chief of The Art Section, an online arts and culture journal that has been publishing since 2007. She wrote for ART PAPERS magazine between 1993 and 2007. She was the weekly art critic for Creative Loafing in 2010. She has written art reviews for Arts ATL since 2017. Her book "She's Got What It Takes: American Women Artists in Dialogue" was published by Charta Books in 2013. The book was reviewed by Andrew Alexander for Creative Loafing magazine. Sirlin received a Creative Capital Warhol Foundation Award for Art Writing in 2010 mentored under Hayden Herrera.
