= Deanna Lynne =

American television producer

Deanna Lynne (born 1970 in Daytona Beach, Florida) is an American television producer. She is a three-time Emmy Award winner. She is known for producing children's television programs in the 1990s.
