= Bola Kampung =

Malaysian animated series

- Title card, used in Season 1
- Genre: Animated; Sports
- Created by: Edmund Chan, Raye Lee, ahLoong
- Directed by: ahLoong
- Creative director: Cheong Siew Wai
- Opening theme: "Bola Kampung"
- Country of origin: Malaysia
- Original language: Malay
- No. of seasons: 5 (Note: For Malaysian release, Bola Kampung has five seasons and 78 episodes as Season 5 contains 13 episodes. Starting from 14th episode from Season 5, a new theme music and series introduction was used. It is rebranded as Bola Kampung X for international release with 13 episodes, which actually from fifth season.)
- No. of episodes: 78

Production
- Running time: approx. 22 minutes (per episode)
- Production company: Animasia Studio

Original release
- Network: TV2; TV3; NTV7; TV9; Disney Channel; RTV
- Release: 2006 – 2010

Bola Kampung (English title: Robokicks international title: Football Kids) is a Malaysian animated television series, revolves around the kampung boys who are passionate in football. The series, spanned with 6 seasons and 78 episodes, aired from 2006 to 2010 on TV2 and it is viewed in more than 16 countries including Indonesia, Brunei, Thailand, Singapore, Philippines, Vietnam and Turkey.

== Premise ==
The story is set in a kampung named Gong Lechar in the Pohon Bambu district; this story revolves around a group of adolescents who have great passions towards football. However, they only play it for the sake of fun. Not until the principal Mr Doud and the newlywed appointed coach, Mr Abdul Rahman decided to form a football team representing their school in the inter school competition. Iwan leads the team in its struggles to become the best in the district. Alas, his dream is against by his father, Azman who doesn't want Iwan to suffer the same fate as him. Azman was once a national player who suffered a tragic fate that tarnished his football career. With the support of his friends, Azizul and Sabok, Iwan manage to steer aside the problems and emerges as the backbone of the team. With togetherness, the team strives to overcome challenges that come along the way in order to achieve their dreams.

== Characters ==
- Iwan (English Dub: Ivan) — Joyful and happy-go-lucky, Iwan's dream is to play for the national team. His idol is Zinedane Zidane. Iwan plays as the midfielder, and his passings are accurate and deadly. He also plays an important role in the team as the captain.
- Fauzi (English Dub: Felix) — Met Ivan during the School Holidays. After that he played in the Pohon Meranti district while meeting Iwan again on the field. He is known as an architect on the field as he has a high skill level and a fine technique. He now plays as a midfielder just like Iwan. He moved to England because his dad got transferred (in season 4)
- Sabok (English Dub: Samuel) — A good friend of Iwan. He is a right-winger with a good control of the both on both feet. He is smart about creating opportunities in front of the goal while deflecting defenders. He is known as a "Pro" at free kicks.
- Azizul (English Dub: Donovan) — His strength lies as a left-winger is his fast runs and accurate passes. His strong legs are a product of hard work helping his father on the paddy fields.
- Kumar (English Dub: Kevin) — He is always worried about his skill level as a striker. His ever increasing stomach size makes his work harder. Thus, he has to work harder to achieve victory.
- Santokh (English Dub: Sean) — A person with a strong ego and very competitive. He believes that he is the best and doesn't work well with others. Nonetheless, he has great talent as a striker and is feared by his opponents with his fast runs and dribbles
- Szeto (English Dub: Simon) — His reputation as the best goalkeeper around is the product of his dedication to helping his father peel off coconuts every day.
- Ah Hock (English Dub: Albert) — Even though he's the best friend to Santokh, Ah Hock is a kind heart whose decisions are always influenced by Santokh. His skills as a striker are only average.
- Amad and Amid (English Dub: Adam and Abel) — Twins who are in the team to defend together. They are very aggressive and have a strong fighting spirit. Their skills enable them to be among the best defenders around.
- Nasha (English Dub: Nicole) — She is the daughter to the Tok Ketua (Village Leader) and is a good friend to Iwan. She is also interested in Football and believes that hard work always pays off.
- Iskandar (English Dub: Marcus) — A player from Mahakarma in Season 1 and moved to Jayapati in Season 2. He likes to play the PSP console shown in Season 5. He has a rich cousin named Jalil. He is a striker.
- Chin and Chun (English Dub: Chad and Clay) — Twins with two different positions in the team. Chin is a defender while Chun is a goalkeeper.

== Episodes ==
=== Season 1 (2006) ===
No. overall	No. in season	Title	Original release date
1	1	"Mulanya Di Sini"	2006
2	2	"Kesedaran"	2006
3	3	"Permulaan Segala"	2006
4	4	"Bermula Pertarungan"	2006
5	5	"Penamat Ditunggu"	2006
6	6	"Latihan Bermula"	2006
7	7	"Ujian Mendatang"	2006
8	8	"Tingkat Cabaran"	2006
9	9	"Ujian Getir"	2006
10	10	"Krisis Meruncing"	2006
11	11	"Selangkah Kejayaan"	2006
12	12	"Akhir Penantian"	2006
13	13	"Penentuan Juara"	2006

=== Season 2 (2007) ===
No. overall	No. in season	Title	Original release date
14	1	"Bertemu Rakan Baru"	2007
15	2	"Permulaan Cerita"	2007
16	3	"Berusahalah!"	2007
17	4	"Rungkaian Persahabatan"	2007
18	5	"Krisis Meruncing I"	2007
19	6	"Krisis Meruncing II"	2007
20	7	"Kepulangan"	2007
21	8	"Bersatu Semula"	2007
22	9	"Kalah Jadi Abu, Menang Jadi Arang"	2007
23	10	"Rintangan Tertinggi"	2007
24	11	"Lawan Yang Hebat"	2007
25	12	"Akhiran Permulaan I"	2007
26	13	"Akhiran Permulaan II"	2007

=== Season 3 (2008) ===
No. overall	No. in season	Title	Original release date
27	1	"Musim Santai"	2008
28	2	"Kecewa Terubat"	2008
29	3	"Telatah Berbeza"	2008
30	4	"Perkelahian Membara"	2008
31	5	"Pemergian Mengejut"	2008
32	6	"Muhasabah Kendiri"	2008
33	7	"Hati Terguris"	2008
34	8	"Robeknya Semangat"	2008
35	9	"Bulan Sejarah"	2008
36	10	"Kuala Lumpur, Kami Sampai!"	2008
37	11	"Amukan Semangat"	2008
38	12	"Merdeka Si Juara I"	2008
39	13	"Merdeka Si Juara II"	2008

=== Season 4 (2009) ===
No. overall	No. in season	Title	Original release date
40	1	"Perubahan Ego"	2009
41	2	"Krisis Lagi!"	2009
42	3	"Kesedaran"	2009
43	4	"Memori Abang"	2009
44	5	"Pengalaman Lawatan"	2009
45	6	"Kawan Internet I"	2009
46	7	"Kawan Internet II"	2009
47	8	"Gajet Rembatan"	2009
48	9	"Perpisahan"	2009
49	10	"Percaya Kendiri"	2009
50	11	"Jurulatih Ganti"	2009
51	12	"Pemain Simpanan"	2009
52	13	"Pemain Terkuat"	2009

=== Season 5 (2010) ===
No. overall	No. in season	Title	Original release date
53	1	"Kejutan"	2010
54	2	"Permulaan Yang Mendebarkan"	2010
55	3	"Kekecohan Si Tompok"	2010
56	4	"Rintangan Berganda"	2010
57	5	"Kembali Mengganas"	2010
58	6	"Kawan Jangan Lawan I"	2010
59	7	"Kawan Jangan Lawan II"	2010
60	8	"Gasing dan Gajet"	2010
61	9	"Dilanda Penyakit"	2010
62	10	"Rahsia Mata"	2010
63	11	"Pencabar Misteri"	2010
64	12	"Arkitek Perlawanan Terunggul"	2010
65	13	"Penentuan Terakhir"	2010

=== Season 6 (2010) ===
Note: But Season 6 13 Episode Of "Bola Kampung X"

No. overall	No. in season	Title	Original release date
66	1	"Pelawat Dari Angkasa Lepas"	2010
67	2	"Pencarian Ahli Pasukan Bermula"	2010
68	3	"Ancaman Strawberi"	2010
69	4	"Sesat"	2010
70	5	"Kekecohan Di Pantai"	2010
71	6	"Rentak Tarian Tersendiri"	2010
72	7	"Misteri Rumah Berhantu"	2010
73	8	"Ilusi Silap Mata"	2010
74	9	"Semangat Persahabatan"	2010
75	10	"Rembatan Perkasa Helang"	2010
76	11	"Kekebalan Dinding Terakhir"	2010
77	12	"Sabotaj"	2010
78	13	"Kebenaran"	2010

== International broadcasts ==
Country	Channel
Southeast Asia	Disney Channel Asia; Cartoon Network (Southeast Asia); Nickelodeon Asia
Malaysia	TV2; TV3; Disney Channel Asia; Cartoon Network (Southeast Asia); Nickelodeon Asia; NTV7; 8TV; TV9; Astro Ceria
Singapore	Suria; Disney Channel Asia; Cartoon Network (Southeast Asia); Nickelodeon Asia
India	Pogo; Hungama TV Marvel hq
Hong Kong	ATV World; ATV 本港台; TVB
China	CCTV
Thailand	Boomerang; Disney Channel Asia; Cartoon Network (Southeast Asia)
Paraguay	SNT 9
Mozambique	STV
Guatemala	Guatevisión (Soon)
Brazil	RBTV (Soon)
Israel	KidZ channel
Indonesia	RTV; Disney Channel Asia; Cartoon Network (Southeast Asia)

== Media ==
=== Film ===
A film based on the series, Bola Kampung: The Movie was released in March 2013.
