= Deanna C. C. Peluso =

American-Canadian musician, author and researcher

- Born: August 1, 1979 (age 46); Vancouver, British Columbia, Canada
- Education: Piano, Singing, Music Composition, Royal Conservatory of Music
- Known for: Research, Counselling, Music Education, Composition, Education, Performance, Painting

Deanna C. C. Peluso (born 1979) is a Canadian, educator in Counselling and School Counselling, musician, composer, music educator, author and researcher in Vancouver, British Columbia. Peluso's work centers on arts-based, relational, and culturally responsive approaches to school counselling and education. She is a Principal Faculty Member and Graduate Supervisor in the Master of Education in School Counselling and Master of Arts in Counselling programs at City University in Canada.

Her earlier work involved immersion in the academic and experiential fields of music, psychology, performance art, technology and education to fuel what is called a unique style of research that focused on how youth engage in Participatory cultures, social media and artistic and musical learning.

== Academic and professional work ==
Peluso earned bachelor's degrees in Music and Psychology and a PhD in Education from Simon Fraser University. She also completed a Master of Education in Educational and Organizational Leadership at the University of Victoria.

Since the mid-2010s, Peluso has been a faculty member at City University in Canada, where she serves as a Principal Faculty Member and Graduate Supervisor in the Master of Education in School Counselling and Master of Counselling programs. Her teaching and supervision focus on arts-based, multimodal, and culturally responsive approaches to counselling and education, emphasizing relational practice, student wellbeing, and inclusive pedagogies.

Peluso is a co-editor and project manager of School Counselling in Canada: A Comprehensive Guide, a collaborative textbook published by Canadian Scholars that examines contemporary school counselling in Canadian educational contexts and the evolving role of school counsellors.

== Research ==
Peluso’s current research centres on arts-based inquiry, relational approaches to counselling, and the ways creativity and multimodal expression support student development and wellbeing. She examines how participatory and expressive practices can foster belonging, emotional literacy, and connection in counselling and educational contexts. Her earlier academic work focused on music education, participatory cultures, youth engagement with digital media, and the use of technology in artistic and learning environments. This included research on how young people use social media, mobile devices, and collaborative creative platforms for musical learning and identity development. Across her career, Peluso has contributed scholarship exploring how creative, technological, and relational practices intersect to shape teaching, counselling, and student support.

== Earlier Research ==
Peluso is an active participant at international and local scholarly conferences in media, music and psychology, and her research focuses on various projects and foundations where an importance is placed on artistic and musical learning and expression within technological societies. Peluso's research has also dealt with the fields of Cognitive Psychology and Memory studies. Her most recent research has been focusing on Music Education and Media literacy, as seen in her 2010 talks at the Media Literacy Conference in London, UK, as well as her focus at RYME - Research For Youth, Music and Education.

Peluso's research has been featured on the Congress 2011 of Humanities and Social Sciences which is organized by the Canadian Federation for the Humanities and Social Sciences. An article on Peluso's research as a part of RYME discussed how the research group is bringing forth a new outlook on childhood education, the arts and the media. This article also recapped Peluso's and her colleagues' presentations at the Congress, and quoted Peluso as saying that "Teachers facilitate the role of exploring these [technological and artistic] opportunities, learn from kids and offer youth empowerment. Everyone has knowledge of what the next person doesn’t."

She has been cited as stating that "Digital mediums for communication, expression and multimodality engaging in one's own life, such as social media (e.g., Twitter) and interactive technology like iPads, enter the classroom in the pockets, bags and backpacks of many of the students and educators, yet only until recently have these digital media become a part of the educational environment. Curriculum designers and policy makers seem to be placing a focus on the role of technology within young people's lives"

== Publications ==
=== Scholarly journals ===
Peluso's publication record in various peer-reviewed journals and academic publications includes articles on music education and the online environment, participatory cultures and the use of educational technology for artistic learning. In her co-authored article in the Canadian Music Educator, Peluso puts forth a set of standards for scholarly blogging.

Peluso's research on the use of iPads within educational applications was published in the July 2012 edition of the British Journal of Educational Technology. She emphasized the fact that the young people of today are requiring a new system of education to accommodate the technological ways that they are learning and communicating. Peluso is quoted as stating:

While young people are engrossed with technology and social media within their everyday lives, using it to communicate, express themselves and learn in novel ways, simply allowing them to use their iPads, or providing them with classroom sets of iPods, does not implicitly mean they will be learning educationally beneficial material. I put forward that due to the intricate and fast-evolving ways that young people engage with these technologies, it may be in order to have an educational curriculum that is developed in collaboration with the young people themselves, that allows them to play an active role in discussing how they are learning.

Based on Peluso's publications in journals on educational technology, she has presented views on iOS technologies (e.g. iPads) and their role in young people's lives as being concurrent with the paradigms on participatory cultures as defined by Henry Jenkins. Further, Peluso is quoted in various venues in questioning how technology can be implemented in the classroom, in a way that is relevant and beneficial to the learners, rather than as a way to meet a curricular goal.

== Publications ==
Book chapters

- Peluso, D. C. C., Berynets, K., Porter, L., & Stella, M. (2025). Embracing complexity and charting new paths in Canadian school counselling. In K. Berynets, L. Porter, D. C. C. Peluso, & M. Stella (Eds.), School Counselling in Canada: A Comprehensive Guide. Canadian Scholars.
- Peluso, D. C. C., Berynets, K., Porter, L., & Stella, M. (2025). Introduction. In K. Berynets, L. Porter, D. C. C. Peluso, & M. Stella (Eds.), School Counselling in Canada: A Comprehensive Guide. Canadian Scholars.
- Peluso, D. C. C., Higenbottam, W., & Stella, M. (2025). Career counselling in Canadian contexts: Navigating the pathways to graduation. In K. Berynets, L. Porter, D. C. C. Peluso, & M. Stella (Eds.), School Counselling in Canada: A Comprehensive Guide. Canadian Scholars.
- Peluso, D. C. C. (2020). Musician development in an era of global networking, transfer, and multimodal meaning making. In J. Waldron, S. Horsley, & K. Veblen (Eds.), Oxford Handbook of Social Media and Music Learning. Oxford University Press.
- Peluso, D. C. C. (2014). Musical learning within a multimodal and participatory digital age: Issues for educational practice. In S. O’Neill (Ed.), Music and Media Infused Lives: Music Education in a Digital Age (Vol. 6). Canadian Music Educators’ Association.
- O’Neill, S. A., & Peluso, D. C. C. (2013). Exploring music, digital media and multimodal literacies through dialogue in higher music education. In P. Burnard (Ed.), Creativities in Higher Music Education: International Perspectives and Practices (pp. 142–162). Routledge.

Journal articles

- Peluso, D. C. C. (2012). The fast-paced iPad revolution: Can educators stay up to date and relevant about these ubiquitous devices? British Journal of Educational Technology, 43(4), 125–127. doi:10.1111/j.1467-8535.2012.01310.x.
- Peluso, D. (2012). Informal and participatory cultures in music education: Pitfalls and possibilities. SFU Educational Review, 5.
- O’Neill, S., Peluso, D., & DeLong, I. (2011). Building a participatory culture for online dialogue. Canadian Music Educator, 52(4), 27–30.

== Music ==
Peluso has been involved in various musical and performance groups since 2000, though according to her website, due to health problems in late 2008 onward, she does not seem to be active in any particular musical group or organization.

=== Compositions ===
Peluso has been composing for over 20 years, but is best known for her performed works that occurred between 2000 and 2007 inclusive. Peluso has an eclectic collection of written compositions written during and after the years she studied music composition at Simon Fraser University. During her Music Composition degree, Peluso collaborated with dancers, filmmakers, actors and with other performing artists to fuel her experience in the field, in music education and to build upon her 14 years of studying and performing Classical period music. Former professors, mentors and teachers included Martin Gotfrit, David McIntyre, and Owen Underhill. Peluso has composed music for not just sole instrumental performance, but has been involved in composing music for dance, theatre and various other performing art installations within the Vancouver area. It seems that her music, artworks and online presence typically are signed under the pseudonym or nickname — dccp.

Deanna C. C. Peluso - Sogno Dolce (Runtime: 12'05")
From a collection of pieces for String Trio, this piece translates from Italian into Sweet Dreams, though the use of harmonics and somber melodies may allude to an alternative interpretation

==== Selected works ====
2003-onward

- Wave Rider - A Hui Ho, (Piano), Performed in Victoria, BC - March 2009
- Viaticus Una, Second Movement (Piece for Two Pianos) - February 2008
- Viaticus Seorsum, First Movement (Piece for Two Pianos) - February 2008
- Haunting Melody, (Piece for String Trio) - February 2007
- Cordially Yours, (Piece for Cello and Piano), Victoria, B.C. - January 2007
- From Cairo to Covilhã, (Piece for Solo Piano and Solo Dancer), November 2006
- Cantata for a Cabaret Contortionist, (Piece for Accordion, Tenor and Dancer), October 2006
- The Chill of An Early Morning by the Sea (Piece for Flute) - September 2006
- Una Estudia de Portuguese, (Piece for Tenor Voice, Fiddle, Mandolin, Percussion, and Harmonica) - September 2006
- The Music Box Circus, (Piece for Orchestra) Performed by the Vancouver Symphony Orchestra, The Orpheum Theatre, Vancouver, B.C. - April 2006
- Sogno Dolce, (Piece for String Trio), Performed by the Infinitus String Quartet, Sonic Boom Festival, The Western Front, Vancouver, B.C. - March 2006
- Tears Idle Tears, (Based on Tears, Idle Tears a poem by Lord Alfred Tennyson), (Piece for Men & Women's SATB Choir) Performed by the Phoenix Chamber Choir, Reading Session - 2005
- I Do Not Love Thee, (Piece for Men & Women's SATB Choir) Performed by the Phoenix Chamber Choir, Reading Session - 2005
- Capuchin Myth, (Piece for Clarinet, Trombone, Accordion & Percussion), Performed at the Sonic Boom Festival, The Western Front, Vancouver, B.C. - March 2005
- Requitas Pacis, (Piece for Cello, Clarinet and Trombone) - March 2005
- Requitas Quare, (Piece for Cello, Clarinet and Trombone) - March 2005
- Ut Quaero Verum, (Piece for String Trio and Modern Dancer Improvisation in the style of Katherine Dunham) - March 2005
- Vida Em Preto e Branco, Performed by Ensemble Symposium, Sonic Boom Festival, The Western Front, Vancouver, B.C. - March 2004
- Tsunami, (Piece for Saxophone Quartet), Performed at the Sonic Boom Festival, The Western Front, Vancouver, B.C. - March 2003
- Shallow Depth, (Piece for Saxophone Quartet), Performed at the Sonic Boom Festival, The Western Front, Vancouver, B.C. - March 2003

==== Performances of compositions ====
Peluso composed a piece for the Vancouver Symphony orchestra, The Music Box Circus, which was performed in 2006 during the Jean Coulthard Readings at the Orpheum Theatre. The Music Box Circus includes the entire orchestra in its orchestration, and is about 5 minutes 20 seconds in length.

The Sonic Boom Festival is an annual composers festival each spring located at the Western Front in Vancouver, B.C. Peluso's compositions have had numerous performances at this Performing Arts festival that showcases various composers and musicians from across Canada. Peluso's compositions have varied from a string trio, a saxophone quartet, to eclectic mixes of accordion, cello and percussion.

=== Artistic performances and shows ===
Peluso has been a performer in various Performing Arts festivals and shows. She has performed music for independent film, dance accompaniment, theatre performances and numerous collaboration projects involving the fine and performing arts.

==== Performances ====
Peluso has been an active participant in the Arts community, both in solo performance and as a part of musical groups or collaborations with theatre, dance or film. During 2003, Peluso performed in the House Performing Arts Festival, as a musician for the theatre group "Un/Stuck", which featured actors from the Greater Vancouver Regional District. In 2003, with the same theatre troupe she performed at Nextfest 2004, the Performing Arts Festival in Edmonton, Alberta.

In 2005, among her schedule of musical performances as a part of dance and performance art shows, she performed with Gamelan Alligator Joy, a performance group that plays a combination of traditional and contemporary Javanese Gamelan. Peluso performed with the same performance group at various other events around Vancouver, B.C. throughout 2005 and 2006.
