= Kris Law =

Film actor

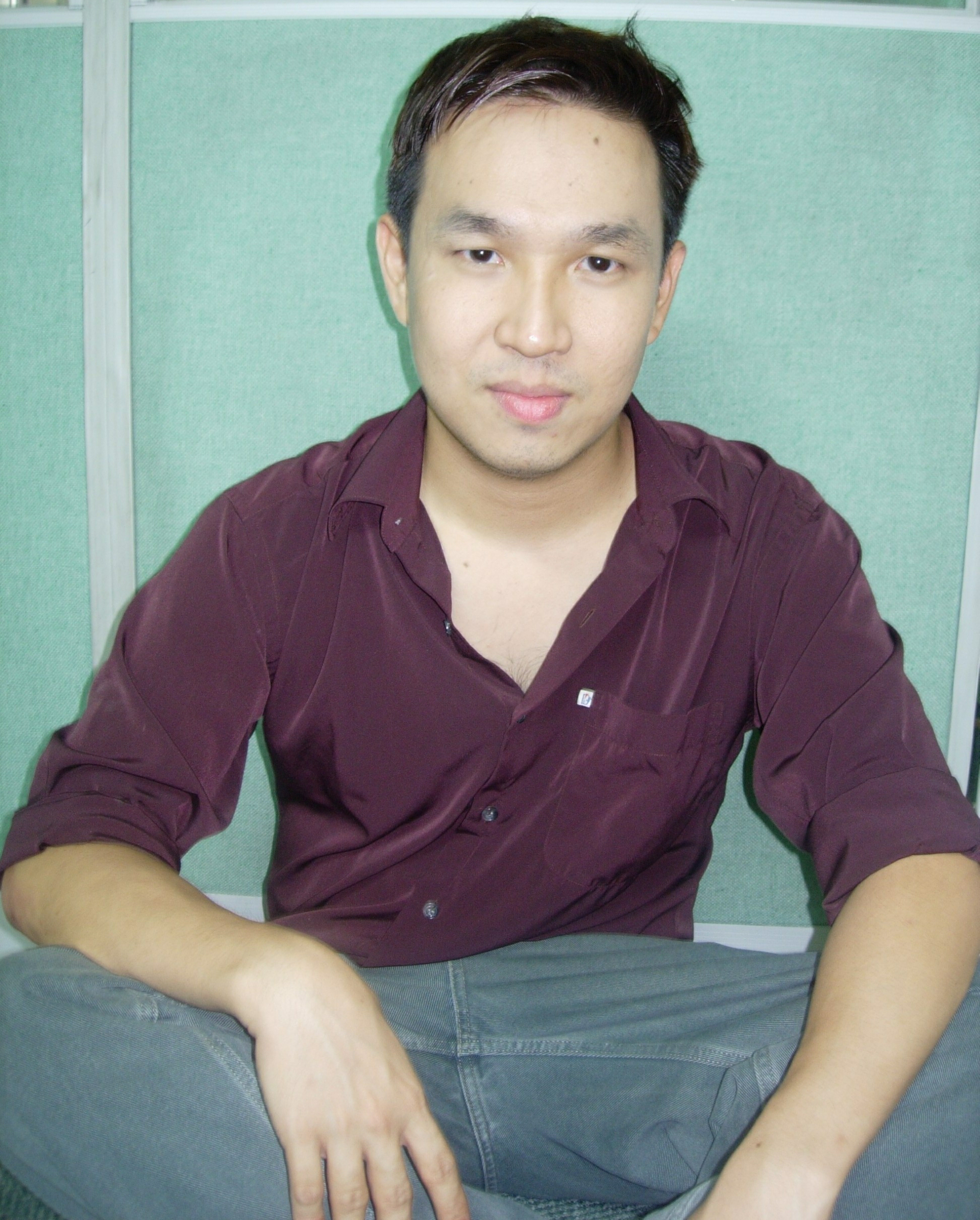
- Born: Law Chin Chiang; 11 July 1978 (age 47); George Town, Penang, Malaysia
- Occupation: Actor
- Years active: 1997–present
- Awards: BMW Film Awards Best Actor
- Website: www.kris-law.com (Flash site)

Kris Law, born Chin Chiang (or KLCC) is a film actor from Malaysia of Chinese and Thai descent. Law was the first ASEAN Actor to debut in India, starring with Academy Awards nominated Bollywood actor Aamir Khan in the Incredible India ad campaign. In Malaysia, Law was most known for the role of Christien, the first openly gay character on Malaysian media primetime TV drama series Ampang Medikal. Law has appeared in Malaysian, Singaporean, Bollywood and Hong Kong films including "Anak Mami Kembali", 1957: Hati Malaya and A House of Happiness, and has starred in over 20 international TV commercials with a total box-office of RM900 million to date.

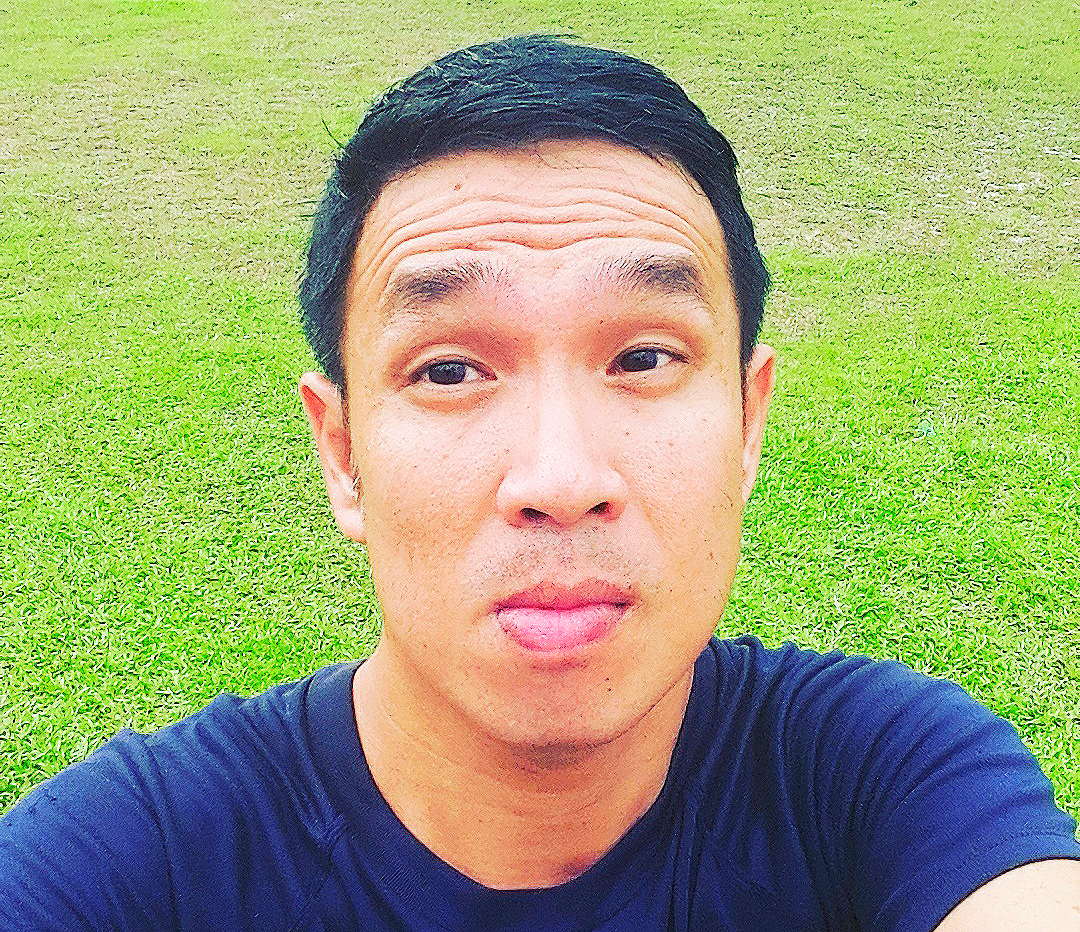
Kris Law in short crop hair, slim figure.

In Kuala Lumpur, he started his career in the creative industry as a copywriter in Leo Burnett in 2000, working under film director Yasmin Ahmad. According to Yasmin, the reasons Law got the position were because of his auspicious full name initials KLCC and royalty bloodline.

== Early career ==
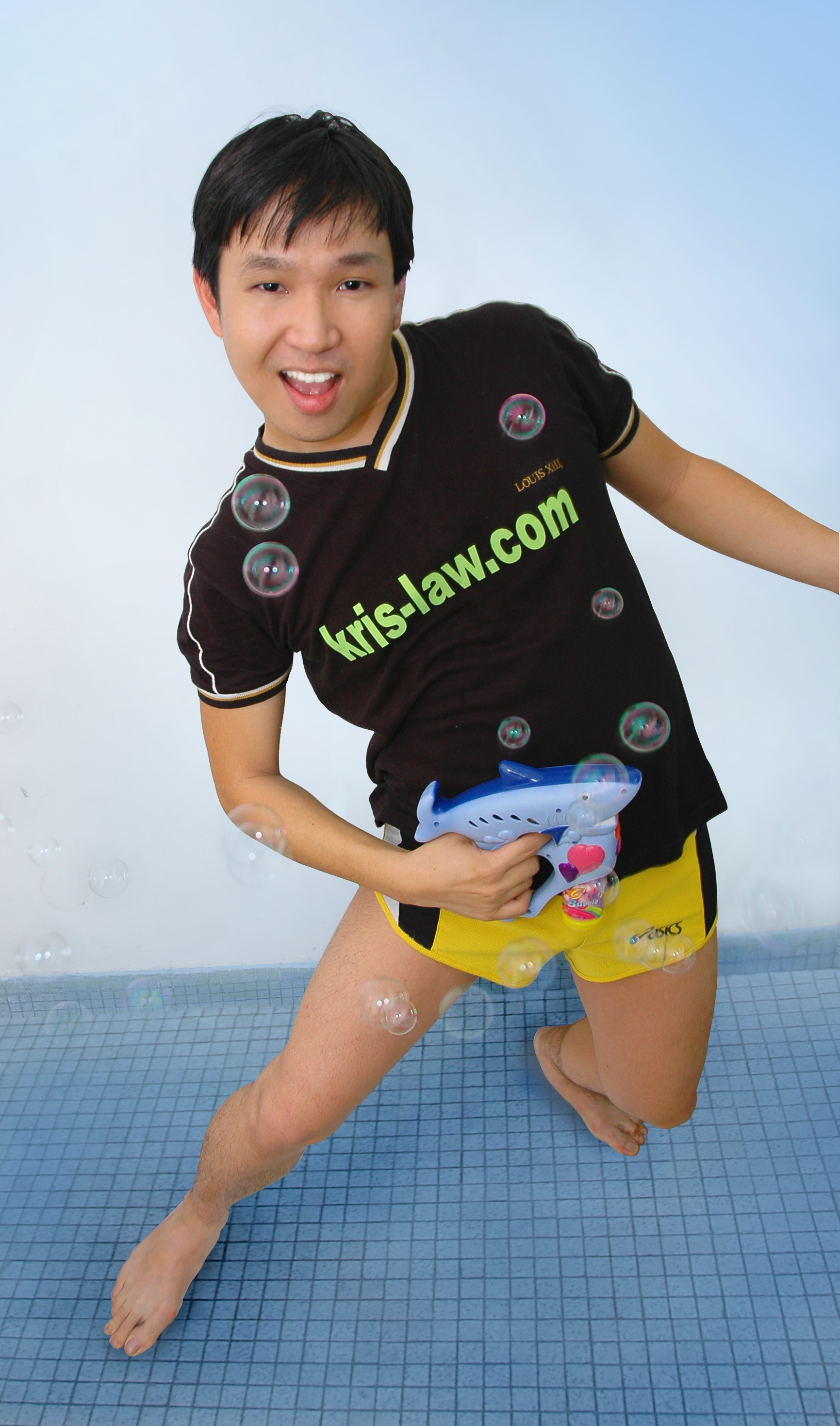
World's First Viral Video Celebrity

In 2004, Law competed in the competitive reality TV show Malaysian Idol. He performed in Yellow Shorts when other contestants wore normal clothes got him onto the front-page news of major newspapers. A University Malaya researcher dubbed his Yellow Shorts performance in a research paper as a form of contemporary dance which captures the zeitgeist of the time and bold social provocateur that defied the discriminatory governmental policies. The "sexy yellow shorts" reference entered into pop culture lexicon when it was widely quoted in the Malaysian politics, education and entertainment circles. In 2005, Law competed again in Malaysian Idol season 2. More offers to star in other reality TV shows followed due to highest TV viewers ratings success of his yellow shorts performance.

As an Actor, Law first acted on stage for the main role of Dick in "Dick Wellington and his Wonder Cat" for The International School of Penang (Uplands). During his tenure at TV3 Academy, he was selected to be the only non-Malay Jury for Anugerah Skrin. Since then, he has acted in many local films. His most controversial screen performance was as a communist in 1957: Hati Malaya (2007) directed by Shuhaimi Baba was censored due to its racial undertones.

== Career breakthrough ==
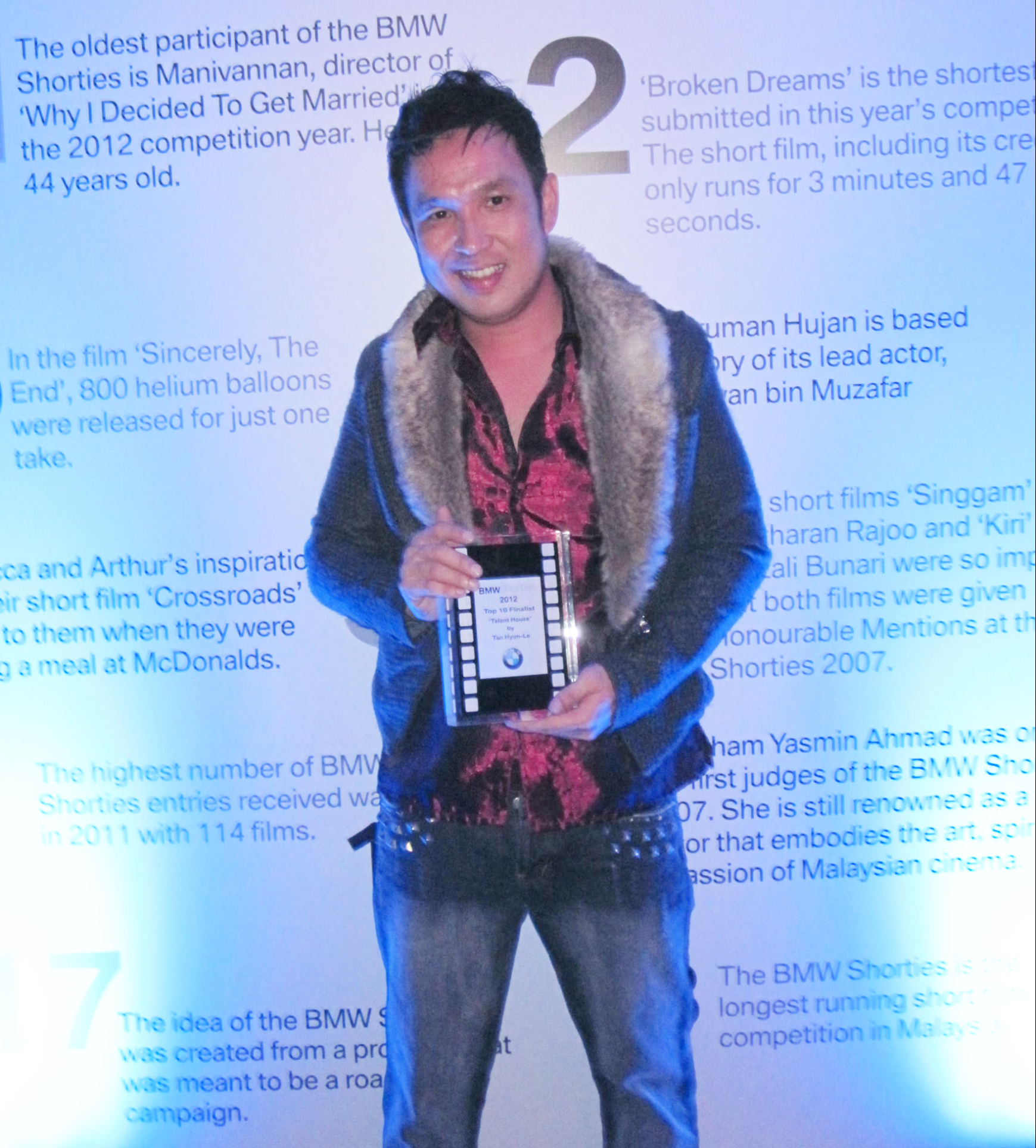
BMW Film Awards Best Actor

Kris Law is the first-ever Malaysian actor to play and portray a gay person character in the Malaysian media during prime time, on an episode of the TV drama serial Ampang Medikal which aired in 2008 – homosexuality is illegal and punishable by law in Malaysia. Law's portrayal of the homosexual character was the first realistic, non-stereotypical and most identifiable to the average LGBT Malaysian.

== Awards ==
Law's main starring role in the film Talent House (2012) was awarded Best Actor by BMW.

Law's most successful TV commercial was "KFC Black Pepper Chicken", which was aired during the peak of the World Cup 2010. His most popular market commercial to date was produced for the Indian Ministry of Tourism's Incredible India! thematic ad campaign titled Atithi Devo Bhav with Aamir Khan in 2015.

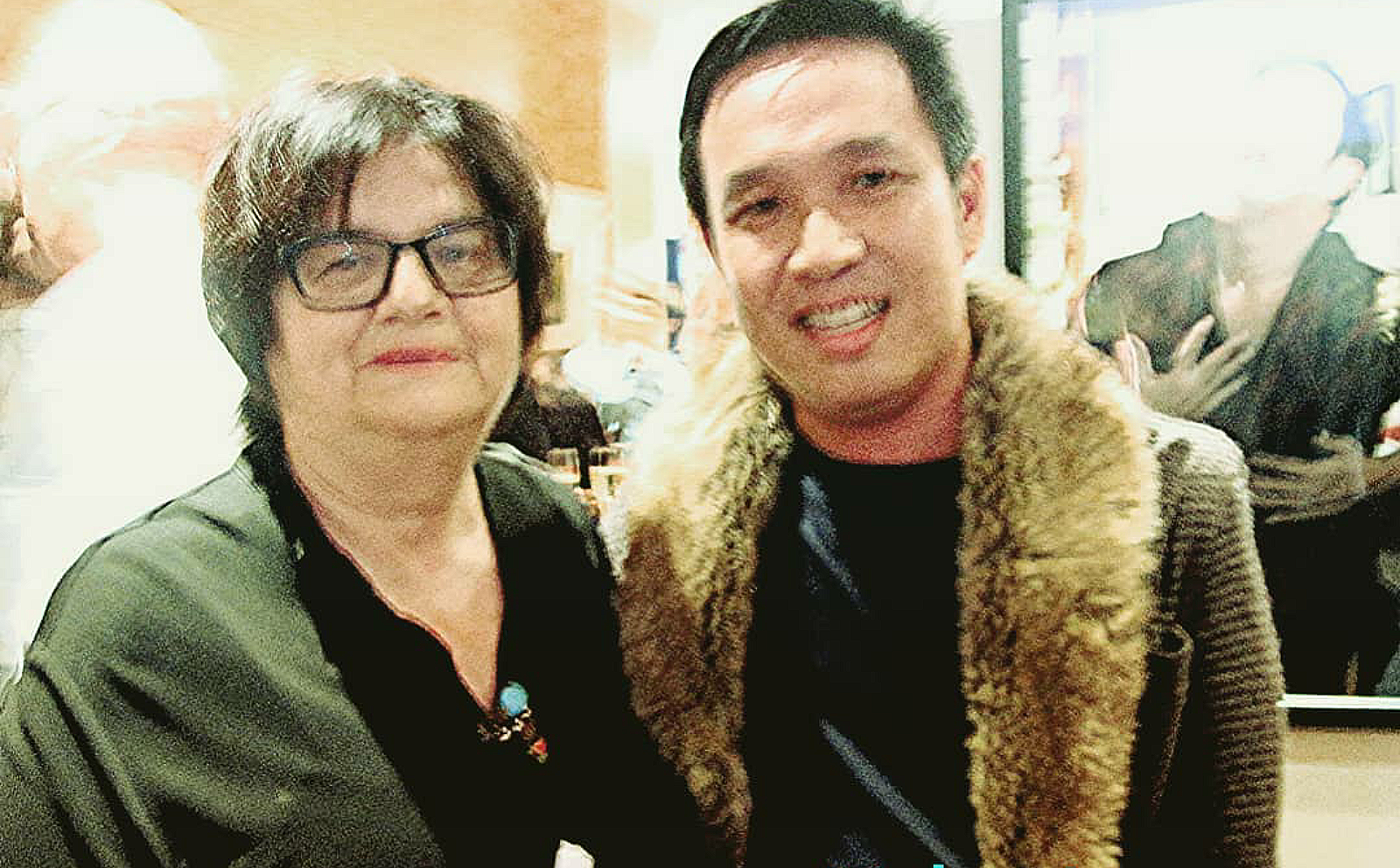
Kris Law being featured in Francoise Huguier photo exhibition

Law is also a model, having posed for a poster calendar which was shot in Bangkok, Thailand (2006). Law was later chosen by French photographer Françoise Huguier to model for her worldwide photo collection debut in New York, Paris, London and other major cities of the world under the Vertical/Horizontal series (2012–2013) which won the Paris Beaux-Arts Academy Photography Prize.

Law has spoken about his support for equal human rights for everyone, regardless of their race, sexuality, religion or background; and to give a voice to youth who are discontent over racial bias in their country.

== Filmography ==
Film
Year	Title	Role	Achievement
1996–1997	"Anugerah Skrin Awards/ Anugerah Juara Lagu	Jury Member	Youngest and only non-Malay
1997	"Melodi"	Guest	
2003	"Trigger"	Mr.Tan (Leading Role)	
2004–2005	Malaysian Idol	Guy in Yellow Shorts	World's first Internet viral video star celebrity
2005	"Gillette Vector Challenge"	Contestant	Asian Television Awards Best Reality Show, Most Favourite Contestant
2005	"Malaysian Top Host"	Finalist	The only reality TV star to appear in 3 different show genres in 1 year
2005	Anak Mami Kembali	Richard (Guest Appearance)	
2006	Telekom Malaysia "Deepa-Raya" (commercial)	Sitar Player (Main Talent)	
2006	"Jejak Jaya"	Kenny, the farmer (Leading Role)	
2006	"Akinabalu" (On the Wings of a Butterfly)	Toshi (Supporting Role)	
2007	1957: Hati Malaya	Commander Zen (Supporting Role)	Censored due to controversy
2008	Ampang Medikal	Christien (Leading Role)	First Malaysian Actor to portray gay person in the media
2008	"Kommunalka" (documentary)	Self	
2008	Digi "Friends & Family" (commercial)	Singing Guy on Water (Main Talent)	
2009	"Seribu Erti"	Andrew (Leading Role)	
2010	KFC World Cup 2010 (commercial)	Main Talent	
2011	"Geng Bas Sekolah"	Mr.Yip (Leading Role)	
2011	"Akinabalu"	Hideaki (Supporting Role)	
2012–2013	Françoise Huguier "Vertical/Horizontal" Photo Exhibit	Model	Paris Beaux-Arts Academy Photography Prize
2012	Talent House	Talent (Leading Role)	BMW Film Awards Best Actor
2013	"Cinta Hidayah"	Albert (Leading Role)	
2014	"Hostage"	Double Agent (Leading Role)	
2015–2023	Incredible India! (commercial)	Tourist (Main Talent) with Aamir Khan	First ASEAN Actor to debut in world's biggest market
2017	"Pentas Haiwan"	Cikgu Tang (Supporting Role)	
2018	A House of Happiness	Heng (Supporting Role)	
2018	Peugeot 5008 SUV (Launch Event)	Model	
