= Kerana Karina =

- Genre: Drama
- Developed by: Alt Media; Grand Brilliance
- Directed by: Aidil Fitri Mohd Yunos
- Starring: Marsha Milan Londoh; Sazzy Falak; Zizan Nin; Elaine Daly; Razally Hussain; Roslan Aziz; Bell Ngasri; Chelsia Ng; Alan Yun
- Theme music composer: Azmeer
- Ending theme: Yang Mana? by Marsha Milan Londoh
- Country of origin: Malaysia
- Original language: Bahasa Malaysia
- No. of seasons: 3

Production
- Executive producer: Michael D'Oliveiro
- Running time: Approx. 5 minutes per episode

Original release
- Network: gua.com.my
- Release: 29 October 2007

Related
- Season 2 aired 16 May 2008

Kerana Karina ("Because of Karina") is the first web drama to be produced in Malaysia, screened at entertainment portal gua.com.my. This drama series stars Akademi Fantasia alumnus Marsha Milan Londoh, Sazzy Falak, Zizan Nin, Elaine Daly and ex-Malaysian Idol judge Roslan Aziz.

Kerana Karina is now in its third season, beginning 20 October 2008. Having garnered almost 900,000 video views, the first season of the show was a big hit among the young Malaysian online community.
