= Ampang Medikal =

- Genre: Medical drama
- Created by: A.R. Ahmad; Keith Chong
- Starring: Diana Rusdi; Nor Aliyah Lee; Nasrizal Ngasri; Azhar Sulaiman; Julia Ziegler; Kris Law; Chelsia Ng; Jagdave Singh; Louisa Chong
- Narrated by: Diana Rusdi (as Siti Ayeesah)
- Country of origin: Malaysia
- No. of seasons: 2
- No. of episodes: 26

Production
- Executive producers: Linda Ziegler; Dhojee; Lotfi Ismail
- Production location: Kuala Lumpur
- Running time: approx. 43 minutes

Original release
- Network: NTV7
- Release: August 21 – November 13, 2008

Ampang Medikal was a Malaysian medical drama series. The brainchild of Abdul Rahman Ahmad (CEO of Media Prima Sdn Bhd) and Keith Chong (CEO of Niche Films Sdn Bhd), the series was the first Malaysian medical drama to be produced, set in a fictional hospital in Ampang, Kuala Lumpur and also the first to feature an openly gay person character onscreen played by Kris Law . Production began on May 5, 2008 and the series debuted on NTV7 on August 21, 2008. The series has been compared to Grey's Anatomy.

== Cast ==
Level	Character	Actor	Specialty
Intern	Siti Ayeesah	Diana Rusdi	
Intern	Melinda Wong Sui Chen	Chelsia Ng	
Intern	Rajesh Sothiwala	Jagdave Singh	
Intern	Melissa Rahman-Wilson	Julia Ziegler	
Guest	Christien	Kris Law	
Resident	Idris Mansor	Nasrizal Ngasri	
Resident	Jeffrey Dato' Sulaiman	Mohd Fazlie Abdul Rahim	
Resident	Maznah Alwi	Nor Aliyah Lee	Cardiology
Resident	Amir Shah Stephens	Azhar Sulaiman	Neurosurgery
Nurse	Rachel Soh	Louisa Chong	
