= So You Think You Can Dance (Malaysian TV series) season 1 =

So You Think You Can Dance
- Season 1
- Starring: Pat Ibrahim; Judimar Hernandez; Yannus Sufandi; Manuela Oliveira; Ramli Ibrahim
- No. of episodes: 14

Release
- Original network: 8TV
- Original release: 5 April – 29 June 2007

Season chronology
- Next → Season 2

So You Think You Can Dance is a dance reality show and competition aired on 8TV. Premiered on 5 April 2007, it is based on the original United States version of the same name. It has a similar premise to the American Idol series of singing competitions, with nationwide auditions leading to the discovery of the next big star.

The organizers of So You Think You Can Dance held one audition in Kuala Lumpur. The contestants that are picked go through callbacks and the Top 20 perform on a live show. This follows a weekly elimination hereafter. The Malaysian version of So You Think You Can Dance had completed its inaugural season with Muhammad Haslam Abdul Rahman Rubaee as the champion.

The show was hosted by Juliana Ibrahim and Jehan Miskin; the latter only joined the cast since episode 9.

== Casts ==
=== Host ===
- Juliana Ibrahim – actress in Realiti and Impian Illyana, appeared in SYTYCD since Episode 1
- Jehan Miskin – actor and TV host, appeared in SYTYCD since Episode 9

=== Judges ===
==== Permanent ====
- Pat Ibrahim – choreographer of Puteri Gunung Ledang the Musical
- Ramli Ibrahim – dance choreographer and artistic director of Sutra Dance Theatre
- Judimar Hernandez – Venezuela-born choreographer and The Actors Studio performer

==== Stylist ====
- Peter lum

==== Guests ====
- Yannus Sufandi – Stage Performer for international artists and support acts such as ARIA'S Awards (Australian Music Awards), RUMBA 2002 Aust Tour, Fatman Scoop Promo Tour, Pharrell Promo Tour and Sugababes Music Videos, and many more, choreographer for TV commercials Samsung, 7UP, etc.
  Appeared in Callbacks, Boot Camp, Top 12, Top 8 and Top 6 Competitions Also as the Artistic Director/Choreographer of the Show
- Jeff Thacker – executive producer of So You Think You Can Dance (America)
  Appeared in Auditions
- Linda Jasmine – ex-choreographer for Akademi Fantasia
  Appeared in Week 1 of Competitions
- Tiara Jacquelina – star of Puteri Gunung Ledang (the film and musical)
  Appeared in Weeks 2 and 3 of Competitions

Note: Juliana, Pat and Ramli Ibrahim are not related to each other.

=== Choreographers ===
The following is the list of choreographers whose involvement in the competition are as shown on TV, followed by their specialties.

- Azwa – Malaysian Contemporary
- Patricia Calzadilla – Salsa, Latin dances
- Choo Teng Kuang – Contemporary
- Farah Sulaiman – Jazz
- Fasilito – Salsa
- Luisa Lau – paso doble, jive, samba
- Amy Len – Chinese contemporary
- Loh Poh Choo – Contemporary
- William Lor – Paso doble, jive
- Umesh Shetty – Indian contemporary
- Manuela Oliveira – Hip-hop, street jazz, dancehall, Also the Artistic Director
- Peter Ong – Latin dances
- Ichiro and Dawn Uchida – Funk
- Michael Xavier Voon – Broadway
- Yannus Sufandi – Hip-hop, Dancehall, Also the Artistic Director

== Season 1 ==
=== The Top 20 Contestants ===
Name (Age, Place of origin)	Details	Performances (Partners)	Eliminated/ Final position
Muhamad Haslam "Alam" (21, Muar, Johor)	A breakdancer since aged 14, having won the solo category in the Malaysian Breakdancing Championship in 2005. The winner of the coveted prize as of 29 June 2007.	1. Contemporary (Noor); 2. Paso Doble (Noor); 3. Contemporary (Noor); 4. Hip-hop (Noor); 5. Chinese Contemporary (Noor) Bottom 6; 6. Hip-hop, Salsa (Nikki) Bottom 6; 7. Contemporary, Hip-hop (Nikki) Bottom 6; 8. Contemporary (Sue) Contemporary (solo); 9. Hip-hop (Dennis) Malay Contemporary (Brancy) Breakdancing (solo)	WINNER
Dennis Yin (19, Subang Jaya)	A cheerleader since secondary school and later member of "Charm All Stars", forwent an opportunity to perform in Japan for this competition	1. Paso Doble (Becky); 2. Jive (Becky); 3. Funk (Becky); 4. Tango (Becky); 5. Malay Contemporary (Becky); 6. Mambo, Hip-hop (Brancy) Bottom 6; 7. Street jazz, Samba (Brancy) Bottom 6; 8. Samba (Brancy) Hip-hop (solo); 9. Hip-hop (Alam) Ballroom/Waltz (Sue) Paso Doble (solo)	1st Runner-up
Suhaili Micheline "Sue" (23, Subang Jaya, Selangor)	Seasoned ballet expert and children's dance instructor in Aurora School of Dancing	1. Hip-hop (Isaac); 2. Hip-hop (Isaac); 3. Samba (Isaac); 4. Contemporary (Isaac); 5. Indian Contemporary (Isaac); 6. Street jazz, Indian Contemporary (Firul); 7. Contemporary, Viennese Waltz (Jimmy) Top 2; 8. Contemporary (Alam) Malay contemporary (solo); 9. Street jazz (Brancy) Ballroom/Waltz (Dennis) Ballet/Tango (solo)	2nd Runner-up
Brancy Tan (27, Ipoh, Perak)	Claimed to be the pioneer of "belly-fusion", the fusion of belly-dancing and rhythmic gymnastics elements	1. Malay Contemporary (Sean); 2. Sevillanas (Sean); 3. Malay Contemporary (Firul); 4. Mambo (Firul); 5. Chinese Contemporary (Firul); 6. Mambo, Hip-hop (Dennis) Bottom 6; 7. Street jazz, Samba (Dennis) Bottom 6; 8. Samba (Dennis) Contemporary (solo); 9. Street jazz (Sue) Malay Contemporary (Alam) Broadway (solo)	3rd Runner-up
Noor Fatimah (26, Kuala Terengganu)	A physical education, science and Malay Language teacher in a primary school, ex-rhythmic gymnastic exponent and later coach in that sport	1. Contemporary (Alam); 2. Paso Doble (Alam); 3. Contemporary (Alam); 4. Hip-hop (Alam); 5. Chinese Contemporary (Alam) Bottom 6; 6. Rock 'n Roll, Malay Contemporary (Yuz); 7. Broadway, Malay contemporary (Yuz) Bottom 6; 8. Latin ? (Yuz) Contemporary (solo) Eliminated	21 June 2007
Mohd Yunus "Yuz" (22, Batu Pahat, Johor)	Dance trainer in Akademi Seni, Budaya dan Warisan; once learned bharatanatyam	1. Malay Contemporary (Nikki); 2. Contemporary (Nikki); 3. Hip-hop (Nikki); 4. Broadway (Nikki); 5. Malay Contemporary (Nikki); 6. Rock 'n Roll, Malay Contemporary (Noor); 7. Broadway, Malay Contemporary (Noor) Top 2; 8. Latin ? (Noor) Malay Contemporary (solo) Eliminated	21 June 2007
Nikki Cheng (??, Kuala Lumpur)	A breakdancing trainee who claimed to have vast experience in winning hip-hop dance championships	1. Malay Contemporary (Yuz); 2. Contemporary (Yuz); 3. Hip-hop (Yuz); 4. Broadway (Yuz) Bottom 4; 5. Malay Contemporary (Yuz); 6. Hip-hop, Salsa (Alam) Bottom 6; 7. Contemporary, Hip-hop (Alam) Eliminated	14 June 2007
Jimmy Wong (26, Kuala Lumpur)	A home-officed fashion designer and hairstylist, once called up by a magazine for one of its pageantry events	1. Contemporary (Azzy); 2. Malaysian contemporary (Jo); 3. Foxtrot (Jo) Bottom 4; 4. Pop (Jo); 5. Indian contemporary (Jo) Bottom 6; 6. Malay Contemporary, Dancehall (Becky); 7. Contemporary, Viennese Waltz (Sue) Eliminated	14 June 2007
Rebecca "Becky" Lee (23, Klang, Selangor)	Children's dance instructor, claimed to be "among the top six in the world" upon her return from the "World Senior Duos dance Masters" competition in 2006	1. Paso Doble (Dennis); 2. Jive (Dennis); 3. Funk (Dennis) Bottom 4; 4. Tango (Dennis); 5. Malay Contemporary (Dennis) Bottom 6; 6. Malay Contemporary, Dancehall (Jimmy) Eliminated	7 June 2007
Shafirul Azmi "Firul" Suhaimi (26, Sabah)	Specializes in contemporary dance, an ex-"Best Student" and now assistant lecturer in Akademi Seni Kebangsaan	1. Broadway (Davina); 2. Jazz (Davina); 3. Malaysian Contemporary (Brancy); 4. Mambo (Brancy); 5. Chinese Contemporary (Brancy); 6. Street jazz, Indian contemporary (Sue) Eliminated	7 June 2007
Joanne "Jo" Stevenson (30, Kuala Lumpur)	In the professional dancing scene for eleven years; a single mother who saw this competition as the biggest hope to sustain herself and her 12-year-old daughter	1. Hip-hop (Shake); 2. Malaysian Contemporary (Jimmy); 3. Foxtrot (Jimmy); 4. Pop (Jimmy); 5. Indian Contemporary (Jimmy) Eliminated	31 May 2007
Isaac Lim (25, Johor Bahru)	Claimed that he dances a style which "fuses Chinese with contemporary" which he learned in secondary school, once invited by Istana Budaya to London to promote tourism in Malaysia	1. Hip-hop (Sue); 2. Hip-hop (Sue); 3. Samba (Sue); 4. Contemporary (Sue) Bottom 4; 5. Indian Contemporary (Sue) Eliminated	31 May 2007
Cristine "Orange" Chung (23, Kuching, Sarawak)	A seasoned rhythmic gymnastic athlete during her childhood, once entered wushu and participated the SEA Games in this sport	1. Salsa (Vish); 2. Salsa (Vish); 3. Dancehall (Vish); 4. Malaysian Contemporary (Vish) Eliminated	24 May 2007
Vishnu "Vish" a/l Nadarajah (25, Balakong, Selangor)	Into bharatanatyam since age 4, once claimed in front of the judges during Boot Camp that his ambitions as a dancer were vehemently detested by his father	1. Salsa (Orange) Bottom 4; 2. Salsa (Orange); 3. Dancehall (Orange); 4. Malaysian Contemporary (Orange) Eliminated	24 May 2007
Alice Yap (25, Kuala Lumpur)	Has her own dance studio, runs children's dance class, also works as freelance instructor in a secondary school	1. Street jazz (Chris) Bottom 4; 2. Street jazz (Chris) Bottom 4; 3. Malaysian Contemporary (Chris) Eliminated	17 May 2007
Chris Ooi (21, Taiping, Perak)	Photography assistant in an advertising firm	1. Street jazz (Alice); 2. Street jazz (Alice) Bottom 4; 3. Malaysian Contemporary (Alice) Eliminated	17 May 2007
Davina Goh (25, Kuala Lumpur)	A member of an events management team; stage theater and film performer; columnist in theSun	1. Broadway (Firul); 2. Jazz (Firul) Eliminated	10 May 2007
Sean Loh (22, Pulau Pinang)	A dance trainee who specializes in hip-hop, jazz and disco	1. Malaysian contemporary (Brancy); 2. Sevillanas (Brancy) Eliminated	10 May 2007
Sheikh "Shake" Gaddafi (26, Subang Jaya, Selangor)	Inspired to dance by watching Michael Jackson at age 12, works in a development company as an "office boy"	1. Hip-hop (Jo) Eliminated	3 May 2007
Azzura Soraya "Azzy" (23, Petaling Jaya, Selangor)	A student in journalism and public relations, once performed dances on stage	1. Contemporary (Jimmy) Eliminated	3 May 2007

=== Auditions (aired 5 April 2007) ===
Auditions were held on 16 and 17 March the same year, with Pat, Judimar and guest Jeff Thacker to judge the participants' dancing skills. Participants who displayed a good degree of potential to them would be recalled to the Callbacks (if their skills are debatable) or qualify directly to the Boot Camp (if they greatly impressed the judges during the auditions).

=== Callbacks (aired 12 April 2007) ===
Out of 500 people taking part in the two days of preliminary auditions, only seven participants were directly headed to the Boot Camp while 80 others were given an extra test in the Callbacks. Pat Ibrahim and Judimar Hernandez returned as judges, this time alongside two other faces, Yannus Sufandi and Ramli Ibrahim. After going through versatility and pairing-up tests, only 40 of them qualified to the Boot Camp – 20 male and 20 female, inclusive of the seven who qualified directly from the auditions.

=== Boot Camp (aired 19 April 2007) ===
The Top 40 were tested on their versatility in various dances and cohesiveness in the competition. The first day of Boot Camp saw the Top 40 practising four different genres of dance under the guide of four choreographers: Hip-hop (Yannus Sufandi), Contemporary (Umesh Nair), Street Jazz (Manuela Oliveira), and Salsa (Patricia Calzadilla). After each of the four choreography sessions they needed to perform what they had learnt from it.

The second day witnessed the contestants doing solo performances, attempting to display "a different side" of theirs to impress the judges for entering the Top 20. At the nightfall of the second day, the judges announced the Top 20.

A notable scene in the aftermath of the results involved one of the rejected ones who broke down to tears, lamenting to have failed to fulfil the last wish of a best friend who he said as to "be dying" that night.

=== Competition (aired 3 May 2007 onwards) ===
Competitions are broadcast live from Ruums KL on Thursdays from 9.30pm (GMT+8). In each of these nights, contestants perform in pairs (each of one male and one female) in Round 1 to impress the judges as well as the audience in the club and at home.

The judges will select the four weakest performers (six in later episodes) to perform in solo within 30 seconds each in Round 2 to garner viewers' votes in order to remain in the competition. Unlike the American version, in which judges select the worst-performing pairs, in here the worst-performing individual contestants were selected.

Viewers are given about 20 minutes including the solo performances. After that, the show goes into a 15-minute break, in which a Quickie Dance Special is broadcast live from Sri Pentas and Ruums KL.

The one male and one female contestants with the lowest votes leave the competition.

The Grand Finale was scheduled to be held on 29 June, in Ruums KL.

==== Week 1 (3 May 2007) ====
A top 10 contestant from season 2 of the American version, Dmitry Chaplin made a special performance before the results were announced.

Round 1

- Jo and Shake: Hip-hop
- Nikki and Yuz: Malaysian contemporary
- Noor and Alam: Contemporary
- Orange and Vish: Salsa
- Alice and Chris: Street jazz
- Azzy and Jimmy: Contemporary
- Becky and Dennis: Paso Doble
- Brancy and Sean: Malaysian contemporary
- Davina and Firul: Broadway
- Sue and Isaac: Hip-hop

Round 2

1. Alice
2. Shake (eliminated)
3. Azzy (eliminated)
4. Vish

==== Week 2 (10 May 2007) ====
Round 1

- Nikki and Yuz: Contemporary
- Sue and Isaac: Hip-hop
- Brancy and Sean: Sevillanas
- Jo and Jimmy: Malaysian contemporary
- Noor and Alam: Paso Doble
- Orange and Vish: Salsa
- Becky and Dennis: Jive
- Davina and Firul: Jazz
- Alice and Chris: Street jazz

Round 2

1. Davina (eliminated)
2. Sean (eliminated)
3. Alice
4. Chris

The contestants performed their first group performance before the announcement of Round 2 results, dancing Malaysian contemporary to the music of Mahaguru by KRU.

==== Week 3 (17 May 2007) ====
Round 1

- Alice and Chris: Malaysian contemporary
- Nikki and Yuz: Hip-hop
- Noor and Alam: Contemporary
- Brancy and Firul: Malaysian contemporary
- Jo and Jimmy: Foxtrot
- Becky and Dennis: Funk
- Sue and Isaac: Samba
- Orange and Vish: Dancehall

Round 2

1. Chris (eliminated)
2. Alice (eliminated)
3. Jimmy
4. Becky

==== Week 4 (24 May 2007) ====
This show witnessed the contestants' second group performance throughout the competition, which was performed at the beginning of the show.

Round 1

- Orange and Vish: Malaysian contemporary
- Nikki and Yuz: Broadway
- Sue and Isaac: Contemporary
- Becky and Dennis: Tango
- Noor and Alam: Hip-hop
- Brancy and Firul: Mambo
- Jo and Jimmy: Pop

Round 2

1. Orange (eliminated)
2. Vish (eliminated)
3. Nikki
4. Isaac

==== Week 5 (aired 31 May 2007) ====
This week witnessed the addition of Jehan Miskin to complement Juliana as hosts of the show, the first themed night, Malaysiana, which dancers performed contemporary versions of Malaysian ethnic dances, and the judges' decision to have a Bottom 6 instead of a Bottom 4, citing the need to reflect "a fiercer competition".

Round 1

- Becky and Dennis: Malay contemporary
- Brancy and Firul: Chinese contemporary
- Sue and Isaac: Indian contemporary
- Noor and Alam: Chinese contemporary
- Nikki and Yuz: Malay contemporary
- Jo and Jimmy: Indian contemporary

Round 2

1. Isaac (eliminated)
2. Alam
3. Noor
4. Jimmy
5. Becky
6. Jo (eliminated)

==== Week 6 (aired 7 June 2007) ====
In this week, the couplings were reshuffled, i.e. each contestant has a new partner; and each couple performed two routines. The night was also noted by the judges as the worst of all the performance nights; only Noor and Yuz's second routine managed to impress them.

Round 1

- Sue and Firul:
1. Street jazz
2. Indian contemporary
- Brancy and Dennis:
1. Mambo
2. Hip-hop
- Noor and Yuz
1. Rock and Roll
2. Malay contemporary
- Nikki and Alam
1. Hip-hop
2. Salsa
- Becky and Jimmy
1. Malay contemporary
2. Dancehall

Round 2

1. Brancy
2. Firul (eliminated)
3. Nikki
4. Dennis
5. Becky (eliminated)
6. Alam

==== Week 7 (aired 14 June 2007) ====
Round 1

- Sue and Jimmy
1. Contemporary
2. Viennese Waltz
- Brancy and Dennis
1. Street jazz
2. Samba
- Noor and Yuz
1. Broadway
2. Malay contemporary
- Nikki and Alam
1. Contemporary
2. Hip-hop

Round 2

1. Brancy
2. Jimmy (eliminated)
3. Nikki (eliminated)
4. Noor
5. Alam
6. Dennis

==== Week 8 (aired 21 June 2007) ====
In the semi-final show, the voting lines were opened from the beginning of the show and contestants could choose their choreographers for their solo routine. The judges gave all six of them positive reviews on their performances. After the elimination was announced, the lines were re-opened for the grand finals.

Round 1

- Sue and Alam – Contemporary
- Brancy and Dennis – Samba
- Noor and Yuz: Latin ?

Round 2

1. Sue: Malay contemporary
2. Alam: Contemporary
3. Dennis: Hip-hop
4. Brancy: Contemporary
5. Yuz: Indian contemporary (eliminated)
6. Noor: Contemporary (eliminated)

==== Grand Finals (aired 29 June 2007) ====
The night began with the resurfacing of memories of the competition as told by the judges and recap footages taken throughout the competition. The Top 4, Alam, Dennis, Sue and Brancy, performed two pair routines (including the first time there were same-gender pairs) and one solo each. The Grand Finals was also graced by the other 16 contestants who were eliminated in the previous eight weeks, as well as guest performances by a jig troupe choreographed by Judimar Hernandez, Joe Flizzow and the Kartel, and Reshmonu and his bhangra drummers.

At 10.20pm, Alam was declared Malaysia's Best Dancer, clinching RM50,000 cash and a role in a theatre project by Tiara Jacquelina.

Round 1

- Dennis and Alam – Hip-hop
- Sue and Brancy – Street jazz
- Sue and Dennis – Foxtrot
- Brancy and Alam – Malay contemporary

Round 2

1. Alam – Breakdancing
2. Dennis – Paso Doble
3. Sue – Ballet/Tango
4. Brancy – Broadway jazz
