= Ashraf Sinclair =

Actor and television host (1979–2020)

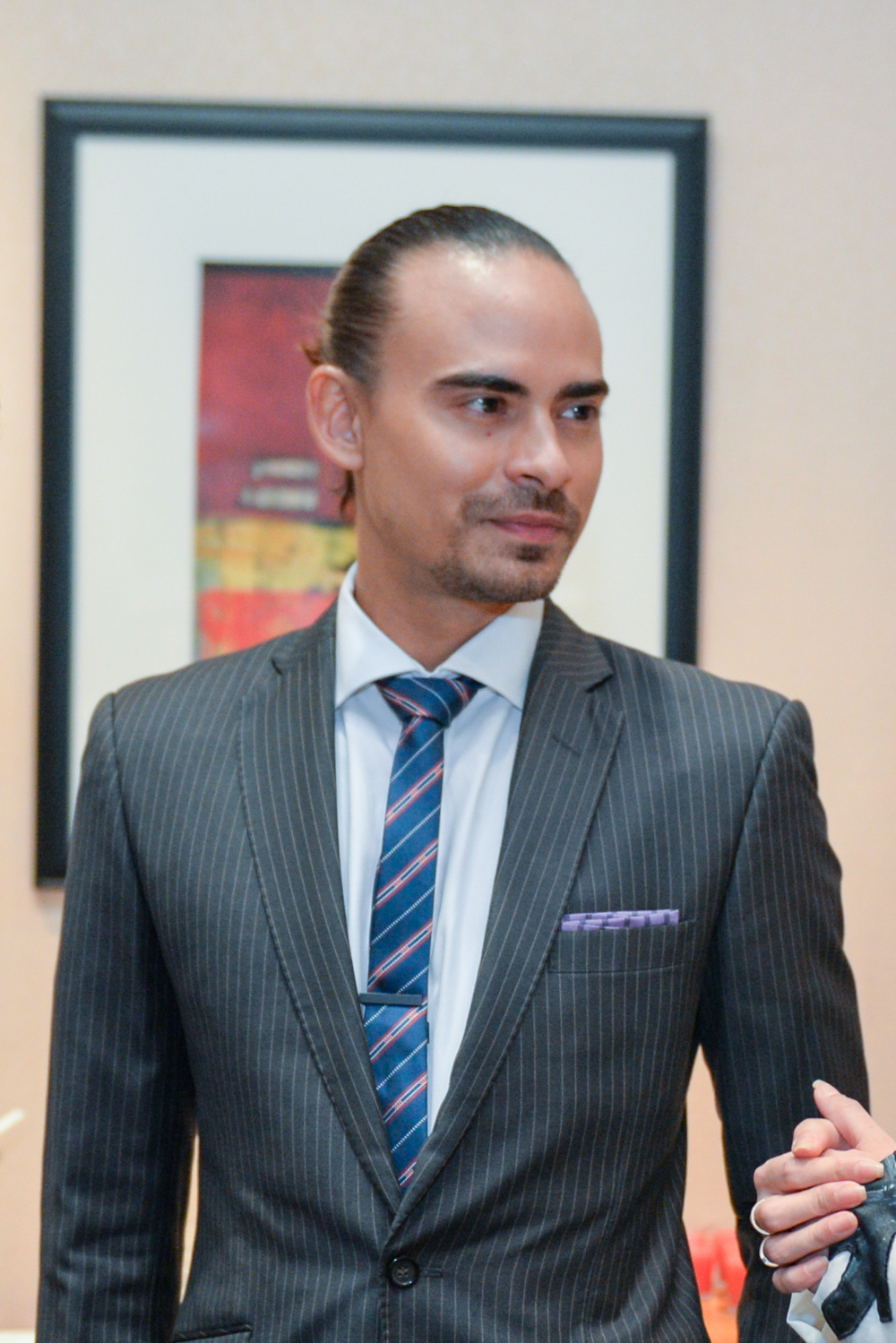
- Ashraf in 2016.
- Born: Ashraf Daniel bin Mohamad Sinclair; 18 September 1979; Croydon, London, England
- Died: 18 February 2020 (aged 40); Jakarta, Indonesia
- Resting place: San Diego Hills, Karawang Regency, West Java
- Occupations: Actor, television host
- Years active: 1997–2020
- Spouse: Bunga Citra Lestari (m. 2008–2020)
- Children: 1
- Relatives: Aishah Sinclair (sister); Adam Sinclair (brother); Yuna Zarai (sister-in-law)

Ashraf Daniel bin Mohamad Sinclair (18 September 1979 – 18 February 2020) was a Malaysian former actor known for his role as Eddy in the 2005 film Gol & Gincu.

== Background ==
Ashraf was born to a pharmacist, Mohammed Anthony John Sinclair, who is British with Irish, English and Scottish ancestry, and Khadijah Abdul Rahman, who is of Malay, Javanese and Arab descent.

== Career ==
Ashraf began his career in 1997 as the second runner-up of the Hero Remaja men's pageant contest. He later made his acting career debut in the 1998 Petronas commercial Kasut Gombak, along with Vanida Imran. He was also once a host of Box Office Now that was aired on ntv7. Later, he starred in shows such as Gol & Gincu The Series as well as Realiti which aired on 8TV.

In 2017, Ashraf became a venture partner of 500 Startups, a global venture capital seed funder.

== Personal life ==
Ashraf was the eldest of three siblings, his sister is Aishah.

Ashraf married Indonesian singer Bunga Citra Lestari on 8 November 2008. They met in 2007 in Malaysia, while he was hosting Beat TV and Lestari was promoting her album. Ashraf resided in Indonesia after his marriage. The couple had one child.

== Death ==
On 18 February 2020, Ashraf died of a heart attack at home and was brought to Metropolitan Medical Centre in Jakarta. On the same day, his remains were buried in San Diego Hills, West Java.

== Filmography ==
=== Film ===
| Year | Title | Role | Notes |
|---|---|---|---|
| 2004 | SH3 | Khairul | |
| 2005 | Gol & Gincu | Eddy | |
| 2008 | Saus Kacang | Fredo | |
| 2009 | The Real Pocong | Ivan | |
| 2018 | Bayi Gaib: Bayi Tumbal Bayi Mati | Rafa | |
| 2021 | J2: J Retribusi | Taufik | Posthumous released |
| 2021 | Proksi | Aman | Posthumous released |
| 2023 | Syaitan Munafik | Danny | Posthumous released |

=== Television series ===
| Year | Title | Role | TV channel | Notes |
|---|---|---|---|---|
| 2006 | Realiti | Burn Ramli | 8TV | |
| 2006–2007 | Gol & Gincu The Series | Eddy | 8TV | |
| 2007 | Tidak Pernah Ku Sesali | Dr. Farid | TV1 | |
| 2008 | Renjis (Season 1) | Ungku Alauddin / Dean | Astro Ria | |
| 2008–2009 | Renjis (Season 2) | Ungku Alauddin / Dean | Astro Ria | Cameo appearance: Last Episode |
| 2018 | D[o]sa: Sacred Sin | Fuad | Astro First Exclusive | |

=== Sinetron ===
| Year | Title | Role | Production House | TV channel |
|---|---|---|---|---|
| 2008 | Sekar | Brama | Sinemart | RCTI |
| 2009 | Sekar | Brama | Sinemart | RCTI |
| 2009 | Cinta dan Anugerah | Reza | Sinemart | RCTI |
| 2010 | Cinta dan Anugerah | Reza | Sinemart | RCTI |
| 2010 | Sejuta Cinta Marshanda | Abel | Sinemart | RCTI |
| 2011 | Anugerah | Arya | Sinemart | RCTI |
| 2011 | Kasih dan Cinta | Atar | Sinemart | RCTI |
| 2011 | Binar Bening Berlian | Dimas Adam | Sinemart | RCTI |
| 2012 | Binar Bening Berlian | Dimas Adam | Sinemart | RCTI |
| 2012 | Putri Bidadari | Jefri | Sinemart | RCTI |
| 2013 | Putri Bidadari | Jefri | Sinemart | RCTI |
| 2014 | Pashmina Aisha | Juna | Sinemart | RCTI |
| 2014 | Catatan Hati Seorang Istri (Season 1) | Eddie Bramantyo | Sinemart | RCTI |
| 2016 | Catatan Hati Seorang Istri (Season 2) | Eddie Bramantyo | Sinemart | RCTI |
| 2018 | Cinta Yang Hilang | Firman | MNC Pictures | RCTI |
| 2019 | Cinta Yang Hilang | Firman | MNC Pictures | RCTI |
| 2019 | Dewi | Dr. Fahri | MNC Pictures | RCTI |
| 2020 | Dewi | Dr. Fahri | MNC Pictures | RCTI |

=== Television ===
| Year | Title | TV channel | Notes |
|---|---|---|---|
| 2005 | Box Office Now | NTV7 | |
| 2006 | Beat TV | Astro Ria | with Sazzy Falak |
| 2006 | Mentor | TV3 | |
| 2006 | Persidangan Alam Sekitar Kanak-Kanak Antarabangsa TUNZA | | On Putrajaya |
| 2009 | Anugerah Planet Muzik 2009 | Astro Ria | |
