= So You Think You Can Dance (Malaysian TV series) season 2 =

So You Think You Can Dance
- Season 2
- No. of episodes: 16

Release
- Original network: 8TV
- Original release: 1 May 2008 – August 1, 2008

Season chronology
- ← Previous; Season 1

The second season So You Think You Can Dance (Malaysia) began airing on 1 May 2008 on 8TV. Auditions were held in Kota Kinabalu and Kuala Lumpur. Aishah Sinclair hosts this season, while Pat Ibrahim, Ramli Ibrahim and Judimar Hernandez return as permanent judges.

Contestants vied for RM50,000 and an 8TV scholarship as the grand prize. In the Grand Finalé on 1 August 2008, Cecilia Yong Ling Shi, known throughout the competition as CC, was crowned "Malaysia's Favourite Dancer" through popular voting.

On 7 November 2008, the second season of So You Think You Can Dance was nominated and won the Anugerah Skrin 2008 award in the category of Best Reality Program.

== Early stages ==
=== Auditions ===
SYTYCD auditions were held in two locations, i.e. the Imperial International Hotel, Kota Kinabalu, Sabah, on 9 March 2008, followed by the Panggung Bandaraya DBKL, Kuala Lumpur (the sole audition ground in the first season) on 18 March. 423 signed up for the preliminary auditions – 106 in Sabah and the rest in Kuala Lumpur.

Out of this, seven from Sabah and 123 from Kuala Lumpur moved on to the "main auditions" on 19 and 21 April, but it was reported that only four out of the Sabah audition qualifiers made it to Kuala Lumpur. The format in this stage is different from that of last season, in which one would either be sent straight to Boot Camp or the Callbacks – this time there is no Callbacks; just two stages of auditions which all who made it in the first stage will undergo the second.

=== Boot Camp ===
From the main auditions, 70 made it to the Boot Camp – three days of intensive pre-competition training. Day 1 witnessed the judges training the dances; Judimar kicked off the Boot Camp by 'warming up' the contestants with contemporary dance. Little did they expect that Pat and Ramli broke out to them that they had been watching them too, reprimanded them for their lack of seriousness toward the competition, and shockingly sent off four of them. Thus, the pressure was on the remaining 66 to perform better as they were split into groups and performed in front of all three judges later in the day.

Halfway into the day, the dancers were split into two large groups: Pat called the hip-hoppers, freestylers and breakdancers while the rest who specialized on ballet, lyrical and contemporary went to Ramli, before the two judges switched groups to get the dancers "out of their comfort zone." After a session to adapt to unfamiliar dance genres, the dancers were split again into smaller groups to perform in front of the judges. The last elimination of the day saw the dancers divided into groups again to face the judges, 14 of which were sent away before the last group to appear were given another chance to prove their mettle. And from that group, three did not make the cut into Day 2.

On Day 2, choreographers were brought in to train four different routines:

- Boojay & Ali – hip-hop
- Azwa – Malaysian contemporary
- Suhaili Micheline – contemporary
- Fasilito – salsa

Early in Day 2 there had been one elimination – a contestant was late for training after oversleeping and had to be sent off. After each lesson from the choreographers, the dancers were divided into groups of six to show what they learned from their choreographers to the judges. For the first two genres, pleasant comments came from the panel, but after the third, the judges and dancers exchanged grouses. To settle them down, Judimar asked the dancers to hold each other's hands and scream to relieve stress, while Pat advised them to "have fun" in the next choreography.

The last choreography session required the dancers to pair up for the salsa routine. After they performed in front of the judges, it was crunch time on the end of Day 2, after which 35 dancers proceeded to Day 3.

On day 3, the dances performed solo dances in genres of their respective choices in their last chance to impress judges and enter the Top 20. At night, the judges took four hours debating on who should enter the real competition, leaving the dancers in extreme suspense. It was after midnight that the first dancer was called to face the panel – Joshua, who joined the first season and dedicated his journey in the competition to his late friend, was dejected in learning that he was turned away in spite of positive remarks by the judges.

== Top 20 ==
The following are the 20 contestants who made it into the competition rounds:

Full name	Alias	Age¹	From	Occupation²	Specialty	Position/ Eliminated
Ng Kar Fei	Black	25	Kuala Lumpur	Freelance dancer	Hip-hop	2008-08-01
Sarah Diana Michele Durai	Sarah	29	Kota Kinabalu, Sabah	Sales and marketing executive	Freestyle	2008-07-03
Mohd Hanafi bin Rosli	Napi	20	Kuala Terengganu, Terengganu	Student, performer	–	2008-06-19
Wong Sook Ken	Jojo	27	Kuala Lumpur	Dance instructor	Contemporary	2008-07-24
Lim Chee Wei	Chee Wei	22	Kuala Lumpur	Student, cheerleader, choreographer	Contemporary; Lyrical; Jazz	2008-06-26
Zefane Fara binti Zakaria	Zef	24	Kuala Lumpur	Boutique owner	Ballet	2008-06-19
Ray Redzwan bin Awang	Ray	28	Kota Kinabalu, Sabah	Cultural arts dancer at Istana Budaya	Traditional	2008-07-17
Yap Hwee Leng	Zen	18	Melaka	Hip-hop and yoga instructor	Hip-hop	2008-06-12
Muhammad Fairul Azreen bin Mohd Zahid	Fai	20	Kota Tinggi, Johor	Student	Contemporary; Traditional	2008-06-12
Chan Wei Yee, Vivian	Viv	25	Petaling Jaya, Selangor	Rhythmic gymnastics and dance instructor	Lyrical; Jazz	2008-06-05
Hafizul Mahmud	Sly	21	Kota Kinabalu, Sabah	Plantation company administrator	Hip-hop	2008-07-24
Ho Cheng Sim	Sim	27	Petaling Jaya, Selangor	Full-time professional dancer	Contemporary	2008-08-01
Mohd Zulfaqar bin Awaluddin	Belalang	28	Johor Bahru, Johor	Choreographer, dancer	Traditional	2008-07-03
Yong Li Shi, Cecilia	CC	21	Kuala Lumpur	Student	Latin; Ballet	Winner
Liew Jin Pin	Raymond	21	Johor Bahru, Johor	Student	Contemporary	2008-07-10
Farah Hanan binti Mohd Nordin	Farah	26	Kuala Lumpur	Medic	Ballet	2008-07-17
Ong Tze Hong	Hong	27	Kuala Lumpur	Dancer, dance instructor	Commercial	2008-08-01
Yee Mei Er, Samantha	Sam	28	Puchong, Selangor	Accounting executive, dancer	Jazz	2008-06-26
Yong Chun Haou	Billy	22	Kuala Lumpur	Student, choreographer	Latin	2008-06-05
Lim Pei Ying, Jorida	J Da	19	Ipoh, Perak	Student, freelance dancer and barista	Lyrical; Ballet	2008-07-10

Notes
¹ Ages were accurate at beginning of competition.
² Occupations were accurate before competition.

== Competition ==
The So You Think You Can Dance competition takes place in Ruums KL as was the previous season, aired "live" on 8TV every Thursday, 9.30pm.

Date	Synopsis	Round 1	Round 2
=== Week 1 ===
5 June 2008	The first night of the SYTYCD showdown kicked off with a solo breakdance routine by Alam, winner of Season 1. Before the night, each of the 10 male dancers were paired with one of the 10 female. Next, each pair underwent training from a different choreographer, each of which fixed a routine for his/her pair to perform on stage. This course is repeated every week throughout the showdown. After all ten pairs were done with their routines in Round 1, the judges chose four worst performers to vie for public votes to remain in the competition; one male and one female with the fewest votes would be sent home afterward. Ahli Fiqir guest performed before the elimination results were announced. Jorida won the show.	1. Black & Farah – Hip-hop; 2. Ray & CC – Mambo; 3. Chee Wei & Sam – Contemporary; 4. Fai & Zen – Dancehall; 5. Belalang & J Da – Malaysian Contemporary; 6. Napi & Sim – Viennese Waltz; 7. Sly & Viv – Tango; 8. Billy & Zef – Jazz; 9. Raymond & Jojo – Hip-hop; 10. Hong & Sarah – Street jazz	1. Billy (eliminated); 2. Viv (eliminated); 3. Napi; 4. Zen
=== Week 2 ===
12 June 2008	Ramli was absent from the panel, his place taken over by Linda Jasmine. This time, six weakest performers were sent down to vie for public votes to survive in the competition. Altimet guest performed.	1. Belalang & J Da – Contemporary; 2. Raymond & Jojo – Broadway; 3. Sly & Zef – Afro-Cuban Contemporary; 4. Napi & Sim – Lyrical Jazz; 5. Ray & CC- Mambo; 6. Fai & Zen – Malaysian Contemporary; 7. Chee Wei & Sam – Hip-hop; 8. Hong & Sarah – Malaysian Contemporary; 9. Black & Farah – Hip-hop Salsa	1. CC; 2. Ray; 3. Zen (eliminated); 4. Chee Wei; 5. Sarah; 6. Fai (eliminated)
=== Week 3 ===
19 June 2008	All three main judges were present along with Yannus Sufandi, the Australian choreographer who had been involved in the show since Season 1. The remaining 16 dance to the tune of film soundtracks in their first themed night – "Night at the Movies." Phlowtron guest performed before the elimination.	1. Hong & Sarah – Hip-hop; 2. Napi & Sim – Cha-cha; 3. Belalang & J Da – Contemporary; 4. Sly & Zef – Rock and Roll; 6. Ray & CC – Hip-hop; 7. Black & Farah – Malaysian Contemporary; 8. Raymond & Jojo – Salsa; 9. Chee Wei & Sam – Street Jazz	1. Napi (eliminated); 2. Jojo; 3. Raymond; 4. Zef (eliminated); 5. Sly; 6. Sarah
=== Week 4 ===
26 June 2008	Dida Malik, a UiTM lecturer who was mentioned as "preserver of Malaysian arts" by Aishah, was the guest judge of the night.	1. Belalang & J Da – Hip-hop; 2. Black & Farah – Malaysian Contemporary; 3. Sarah & Hong – Lyrical; 4. Sly & Sim – Lyrical Hip-hop; 5. Chee Wei & Sam – Contemporary Salsa; 6. Ray & CC – Viennese Waltz; 7. Raymond & Jojo – Pop	1. J Da; 2. Chee Wei (eliminated); 3. Sarah; 4. Hong; 5. Sam (eliminated); 6. Raymond
=== Week 5 ===
3 July 2008	Manuela Oliveira, the Australian choreographer who is also among the dancers' trainers, joined the panel for the night. Prior to announcing the eliminations, all 12 dancers were paired up again for the following week: Sly & Jojo; Belalang & Sarah; Ray & Farah; Raymond & J Da; Hong & CC; Black & Sim; Nevertheless, two of them had to leave, i.e. the newly paired Belalang and Sarah.	1. Ray & CC – Contemporary Jazz; 2. Black & Farah – Hip-Hop Contemporary; 3. Hong & Sarah – Malaysian Contemporary; 4. Raymond & Jojo – Hip-Hop/Martial Arts; 5. Sly & Sim – Malaysian Contemporary; 6. Belalang & J Da – Foxtrot	1. J Da; 2. Belalang (eliminated); 3. Sarah (eliminated); 4. Hong; 5. CC; 6. Ray
=== Week 6 ===
10 July 2008	The Top 10 were arranged into new pairs, each of which perform twice. Tiara Jacquelina appeared as guest judge, while Nita from Malaysian Idol performed before the elimination.	1. Raymond & J Da – Mambo & Pop-Rock; 2. Sly & Jojo – Hip-hop Fusion & Lyrical Waltz; 3. Ray & Farah – Salsa & Contemporary; 4. Black & Sim – Malaysian Contemporary & Rock/Pop/Hip-Hop; 5. Hong & CC – Contemporary Pop & Rock & Roll	1. CC; 2. Hong; 3. Ray; 4. Jojo; 5. J Da (eliminated); 6. Raymond (eliminated)
=== Week 7 ===
17 July 2008	Eight dancers remained and the judges decided to decide the bottom four only. Arts performer Marion D'Cruz guest judged. The live telecast skipped footage of the dancers' rehearsals. Black, who had been praised as the most consistent dancer thus far, shockingly found himself at the bottom four – this may be attributed to his second routine of the night – yet he narrowly escaped elimination. Suki Low, winner of One in a Million (Season 1) performed before the elimination.	1. Sly & Jojo – Paso Doble & Hip Hop; 2. Ray & Farah – Malaysian Contemporary & House; 3. Hong & CC – Hip-Hop & Gothic Waltz; 4. Black & Sim – Latin Fusion & Pop	1. Jojo; 2. Ray (eliminated); 3. Farah (eliminated); 4. Black
=== Week 8 ===
24 July 2008	In the penultimate week of the competition, Aida Redza sat alongside the judges. Six dancers performed their couple routines once, followed by all of them vying for audiences' votes by performing solo routines once for sixty seconds each.	1. Sly & Jojo; 2. Black & Sim; 3. Hong & CC	1. Sly (eliminated); 2. Hong; 3. Black; 4. Jojo (eliminated); 5. CC; 6. Sim

=== Grand finale ===
The final night of the competition was held in Ruums KL as in the previous weeks, but was brought to 8.30pm on Friday, 1 August. Voting lines were open from the moment the Top 4 were revealed the week before till the end of the Grand Finale.

The 16 finalists who had been eliminated earlier throughout the competition returned to kick-start the party with a medley consisting of a hip hop piece with a fusion of Feedback (Janet Jackson) and Gimme More (Britney Spears); followed by salsa-ing to Gotta Get Down (Celia Cruz); a lyrical piece to Requiem for a Dream from the Lord of the Rings soundtrack; and finally a Malaysian contemporary piece with the appearance of Zainal Abidin as the singer of Senang Senang and the Top 4 taking the stage. Zainal carried on his singing with Orak Arik as the dancers left the stage.

Ramli Ibrahim, Judimar Hernandez and Pat Ibrahim reprised their role as dance commentators, without any guest judge and no role in deciding the champion. The Top 4 embarked on their showdown in same-gender pairs. CC and Sim performed with chairs from the tutelage of Manuela Oliveira, to the song Ain't No Other Man (Christina Aguilera); followed by Hong and Black doing the cha-cha, styled as Secret Agents amidst the backdrop of the score Bond on Bond recorded by string quartet Bond.

Next, it was back to male-female pairs to re-enact the judges' picks from all the choreographies witnessed throughout the season. Hong and Sim did the hip-hp contemporary which Black and Farah performed in week 5 with the song Elevator (Flo Rida). Black and CC re-enacted the choreography performed by Hong and Sarah in week 1, with the song No Air (Jordin Sparks and Chris Brown).

The showdown was paused midway to make way for Nur Shahila Amir Hamzah, runner-up of One in a Million season 2, with Cat Farish, performing the song Bebaskan, in the midst of which, Alam, the champion of season one, to introduce his own TV show Alam's Story which appeared on 8TV on 3 August; the aforementioned song is the theme of the show.

The Top 4 proceeded to solo routines, this time without an obvious time limit:

1. Hong performed poetically to the rhythm of In My Bed (Rain), with a red rose as a prop
2. CC did the samba to Magalena by Sergio Mendez
3. Black donned an all-pink suit for his piece with the Pink Panther theme
4. Sim danced around the stage to In the Garden (Dolores O'Riordan) with a suspended ribbon and a pair of scissors as props

At about 10.20pm, Aishah asked the judges a question on whom among the Top 4 deserved to win. At first, Pat was hesitant to answer, but after Hernandez and Ramli expressed Hong and Sim as their respective favourites, thus Pat bowed to the pressure and mentioned CC as his selection. Finally, the voting lines were closed and, in a suspenseful fashion, CC was announced "Malaysia's Favourite Dancer" based on popular voting.
