= Dunia Anita =

- Genre: Drama comedy
- Written by: Nor Aliah Lee
- Directed by: Aziz M. Osman
- Starring: Siti Fazurina; Zul Yahya; Lydia Ibtisam
- Opening theme: Pilihlah Aku by Lydia Ibtisam
- Country of origin: Malaysia
- Original language: Malay
- No. of seasons: 3
- No. of episodes: 39

Production
- Producer: Aziz M. Osman
- Running time: 20 minutes
- Production company: Ace Motion Pictures

Original release
- Network: TV3
- Release: 2005 – 2007

Dunia Anita is a Malaysian sitcom drama, broadcast every Wednesday at 10:00 pm on TV3 from 2005 to 2007. The show lasted 3 seasons and 39 episodes. This sitcom is a spin-off of comedy drama Puteri, directed by Aziz M. Osman, and stars Siti Fazurina and Zul Yahya.
