= Lydia Ibtisam =

Malaysian actress and singer (1980–2026)

- Born: Nur Ibtisam binti Abdul Wahab; 4 October 1980; Cairo, Egypt
- Died: 23 July 2026 (aged 45); Kuala Lumpur, Malaysia
- Education: University of Malaya
- Occupations: Actress, singer, model
- Years active: 1999–2026
- Spouse: Ezam Merican (m. 2008)
- Children: 2

Nur Ibtisam Abdul Wahab (4 October 1980 – 23 July 2026), also known as Lydia Ibtisam, was a Malaysian actress and singer. She was best known for her role in the series Impian Illyana and her role as Zaitun in Dunia Anita; she sang the theme songs for both series.

== Early life and education ==
Lydia was born in Cairo, Egypt, the third of her parents' six children. Her parents both worked in education, her mother as a teacher and her father for an education department. Lydia, who was of Arab and Malay descent, grew up in both Egypt and Malaysia. She attended the University of Malaya and graduated with a degree in multimedia communications.

== Career ==
Lydia began her career as a child actor, acting in commercials for companies such as Celcom, Telekom Malaysia and Sunsilk TV. Eventually, director Zulkifli M. Osman, who knew her family, asked her whether she wanted to act in a drama called Cyberjaya, and she gradually established herself as an actress during the 1990s and 2000s. She became known in Malaysian acting circles after playing the role of Zaitun, the main character's best friend, in the 52-episode TV3 series Dunia Anita, though she was best known for her role in the series Impian Illyana. She played Dayang in the 2006 series Realiti, and also acted on the TV3 series Natasha. In 2010, Lydia was cast as Dayang Senandung in the TV3 children's show Cheritera.

In addition to acting, Lydia was also a singer; she sang the theme song for both Impian Ilyana and Dunia Anita and, in 2009, filmed an episode for Celebrity Karaoke.

== Personal life and death ==
Lydia was married to Ezam Merican; the couple had two children.

During the last eight years of her life, she lived with lupus. In July 2026, she was hospitalised at the KPJ Tawakkal Specialist Hospital in Kuala Lumpur due to the disease. She died on 23 July 2026 at the age of 45, and was buried in George Town, Penang.

== Filmography ==
Year	Title	Role	Ref.
2004	Impian Illyana	Illyana	
2005	Dunia Anita	Zaitun	
2005	Natasha	Marina	
2006	Realiti	Dayang	
2009	Celebrity Karaoke	Herself	
2010	Cheritera	Dayang Senandung	
2010	Chopp!		
