= Cindy Fatika Sari =

- Born: December 18, 1978 (age 47); Malang, East Java, Indonesia
- Occupations: Actress; model; singer
- Years active: 1992–2024
- Musical career
- Genres: Alternative rock
- Instruments: Vocal; Guitar
- Label: Aquarius Musikindo

Cindy Fatika Sari (born December 18, 1978) is an Indonesian-born Canadian retired actress, model, and singer-songwriter who was active in the Indonesian entertainment industry. After retiring in 2024, she moved to Edmonton and later acquired Canadian citizenship.

== Early life and career ==
Sari was born in Malang, East Java on December 18, 1978. She obtained a degree in Video Production at the Art Institute of Dallas.

Sari started her career in entertainment by participating in and winning the Gadis Sampul 1992 competition.

In 2002, Sari entered the music industry with the release of her solo album Kala Kunanti, under the Aquarius Musikindo label. In 2005, she released her second album A Gift from Heaven.

== Personal life ==
Sari married Tengku Firmansyah on 11 March 1999. On 27 March, 2000, she gave birth to their daughter Tengku Syaira Anataya. On December 6, 2003, she gave birth to their twins Tengku Omar Atalla and Tengku Kianu Zimraan.

In 2024, Sari decided to retire from the entertainment industry, moving to Edmonton and acquiring Canadian citizenship alongside her husband. Since moving there, Sari has worked part-time at a clothing retailer.

== Discography ==
=== Albums ===
- Kala Kunanti (2002)
- A Gift from Heaven (2005)

=== Singles ===
- "Aku Ingin"
- "Bila Waktu Bicara" (with Tengku Firmansyah)
- "Bukan Tempatku"
- "Dry"
- "Hadiah untuk Teman"
- "Jelaga"
- "Metamorfosa"
- "Menembus Awan"
- "Usai Sudah"
- "Kala Kunanti"
- "Satu Sosok"
- "Cinta Untukmu"
- "Ku Ingin Engkau Tahu"
- "Banyak Pilihan"
- "Ini Salahku"
- "Kau"
- "Rela"
- "Sensitif"
- "Keinginan Jiwa"
- "Terlambat"

== Filmography ==
=== Films ===
Year	Title	Role	Note(s)
2014	My Idiot Brother	Mama Angel	
2015	Move On		
2023	My Idiot Brother 2: Angel, Kami Semua Punya Mimpi	Mama Angel	
2023	172 Days	Umi Zira	

=== Television series ===
Year	Title	Role	Note(s)
1995	Senja Makin Merah	Hanny	
1995	Mutiara Cinta	Siska	
1997	Bidadari Yang Terluka	Santi	
1999—2002	Cerita Cinta		2 seasons
2000	Cintaku Tembus Waktu		
2000	Di Langit Ada Sejuta Bintang		
2001	Buah Hati yang Hilang		
2004—2005	Jodoh Jejaka	Jaka's sister	
2005	Hidayah		
2005	Pintu Hidayah		
2006	Di Atas Sajadah Cinta		
	OB (Office Boy)		Guest star
2007	Soleha	Soleha's mother	
2007	Bawang Putih Bawang Merah	Vera	
2007	Nona Dewa		
2007	Dewi 3 Sayang		
2008	Jelita	Lirna Dewantari	
2009	Alisa	Riska	
2011—2012	Dewa	Gita	
2012	Putri Bidadari	Wati	
2013	Diam-Diam Suka	Sri's aunt	
2013—2015	Tukang Bubur Naik Haji the Series	Lutfia	
2014	Cinta Anak Cucu Adam	Erna	
2015	Ngantri ke Sorga the Series	Halimah	
2015	Sakinah Bersamamu	Dika's mother	
2016	Rahasia Cinta	Intan	
2016	Popcorn	Mayang	
2016	Hijab I Love You	Vera	
2016—2017	Gerhana Bulan Merah	Dewi	
2017	Masa Muda	Suryani	
2017	Dikejar Rejeki	Rohmi	
2017—2023	Tukang Ojek Pengkolan	Amira	
2019—2020	Gober	Amira	
2020	TOP: Abi Umi	Amira	
2023—2024	Dia yang Kau Pilih	Ratih	
2024	Tertawan Hati	Nenny	

=== Web series ===
Tahun	Judul	Peran	Catatan
2023	Bidadari Bermata Bening	Istiqomah binti Ridwan	

=== Television films ===
- Mantan Guruku
- Dokter Biadab
- Maha Kasih: Pura-Pura Buta
- Legenda: Wewe Gombel
- Dongeng: Putri dan Peri Biru (2007)
- Ghost: Hantu Jeruk Purut (2007)
- TV Movie: Perempuan di Pinggir Jalan (2013)
- Sinema Pintu Taubat: Anak Pembantu Jadi Sarjana (2016) sebagai Aminah
- Sinema Pintu Taubat: Aku Bangga Sujud di Kaki Tukang Sapu (2016) sebagai Wulan
- Sinema Pintu Taubat: Haruskah Aku Berbagi Kasih Sayang Ibu? (2016) sebagai Wina
- Sinema Sore: Tukang Karedok itu Ibuku (2016) sebagai Ibu Santi
- Sinema Indosiar: Kemarahan Anakku Membuatku Terpisah dari Istriku (2016)
- Sinema Indosiar: Ibuku Kuli Bangunan (2017) sebagai Safa
- FTV Ramadan: Aku Bukan Anak Adopsi (2023)
- FTV Ramadan: Anak Angkat Durhaka (2023)

=== Television series ===
- Smash & EGP (1995) — with Coboy and Ira Riswana
- Visi Musik
- Ekspresi
- Hip Hip Hura
- Inbox

=== Music videos ===
- "Separuh Nafas" — Dewa 19 (2001)
- "Rakit" — Nadzira Shafa (2023; theme song from 172 Days)
