= Puteri (2005 TV series) =

Malaysian sitcom-drama series

- Genre: Drama, comedy
- Starring: Nora Danish; Kenchana Devi; A. R. Badul; Beego
- Opening theme: Cinta by Amy Mastura (from season 4 onwards); Sha Na Na by Amy Mastura (from seasons 1-3)
- Country of origin: Malaysia
- Original language: Malay
- No. of seasons: 9

Production
- Executive producer: Aziz M. Osman
- Producer: Nor Aliah Lee
- Running time: 22–26 minutes

Original release
- Network: TV3
- Release: January 7, 2005 – 2008

Related
- Dunia Anita

Puteri was a Malaysian sitcom-drama directed by Aziz M. Osman and starring Nora Danish as the titular character. It originally aired every Wednesday at 10:00 pm on TV3, from 2005 to 2008.

== Premise ==
The sitcom tells the story of Puteri (Nora Danish), a beautiful girl who, along with her two friends, Kamala (Kanchana Devi Segeran) and Anita (Siti Fazurina), are renting a room in a house belonging to Pak Badar (AR Badul) and his wife, Lilian (Louisa Chong).

Puteri falls for Roslan, a kind-hearted guy who is Pak Badar's driver. Later in the series, Anita leaves for Johor Bahru and is replaced by Nadia, a Singaporean girl who is Pak Badar's niece. Nadia falls for Roslan, too and results in Puteri and Nadia constantly fighting for Roslan. Roslan on the other hand, loves Puteri and not Nadia.

== Cast ==
- Nora Danish - Puteri Farah Nordin
- Kanchana Devi Segeran - Kamala
- Siti Fazurina - Anita (Seasons 1, 2 and 3)
- Melissa Tong - Soo Sans (Seasons 4, 5 and 6)
- Intan Ladyana - Nadia (Seasons 7, 8, 9 and 10)
- Beego - Roslan
- AR Badul - Pak Badar
- Louisa Chong - Lilian
- Awal Ashaari - Helmi (Seasons 4, 6 and 7)

== Theme songs ==
- Sha Na Na - Amy Mastura
- Cinta - Amy Mastura
