= Putri Bidadari =

- Genre: Children; Comedy; Fantasy
- Created by: SinemArt
- Developed by: Maudy Ayunda
- Directed by: UMAM AP
- Creative director: Desiana Larasati
- Presented by: Deswita Maharani
- Starring: Qheyla Zavyera Valendro; Sandra Dewi; Atalarik Syah
- Judges: Agnes Monica; Deddy Corbuzier; Anang Hermansyah
- Voices of: Sandra Dewi
- Narrated by: Iwan Fals; B.J. Habibie
- Theme music composer: Yovie Widianto
- Opening theme: "Melangkah Lagi", Gita Gutawa
- Ending theme: "Melangkah Lagi", Gita Gutawa
- Country of origin: Indonesia
- Original language: Indonesian
- No. of seasons: 1
- No. of episodes: 104

Production
- Executive producer: Elly Yanti Noor
- Producer: Leo Sutanto
- Production location: Jakarta
- Cinematography: Serena Luna
- Editor: Rosyi Tauhid Ace
- Camera setup: Djenar Maesa Ayu
- Running time: 1-hours.
- Production company: SinemArt Productions

Original release
- Network: RCTI
- Release: 27 August 2012 – 6 January 2013

Related
- Magic

Putri Bidadari (English:Angelic Princess) is an Indonesian long-running soap opera with full-episode. It was produced by SinemArt Productions and network by RCTI and starred character such as Qheyla Zavyera Valendro, Sandra Dewi and Atalarik Syah.

== Cast ==
Cast	As	Relation
Qheyla Zavyera Valendro	Putri	Bundadari and Angelo's stepdaughters Sari and Mahmud's daughters
Sandra Dewi	Bundadari	Angelo's younger sister
Atalarik Syah	Angelo/Uncle Gelo	Bundadari's older brother
Nena Rosier	Grandma Ida	Putri's grandmother Sari and Mahmud's mother
Oki Setiana Dewi	Sari	Putri's mother
Ashraf Sinclair	Jefri	Baby's father
Masayu Anastasia	Aini	Abi's mother
Aura Kasih	Dini	Baby's mother
Jihan Fahira	Sari	Putri's mother
Ponco Buwono	Mahmud	Putri's father
Aqeela Calista	Zahra	Putri's best friend Koh Liang and Aunty Mira's daughter
Cantik Salzabillah	Maura	Putri's enemy
Cindy Fatikasari	Wati	Putri's stepmother Nining's stepmother
Tengku Firmansyah	Irwan	Putri's stepfather Nining's stepfather
Hengky Solaiman	Koh Liang	Zaki and Zahra's father
Novia Ardhana	Aunty Mira	Zaki and Zahra's mother
David Chalik	Mr. Ustadz	Siti's father
Sinyo Rudi	Mr. RT	Benno's father
Alejandro Cool	Benno	Mr. RT's son
Nada Purba	Nana	Putri's enemy
Salwa Azis	Baby	Dini and Jefri's daughter
Adam Andrean	Arul	Putri's best friend
Tyzar Praneda	Abi	Aini's son Putri's best friend
Kholidi Assadil Alam	Uncle Irwan	Anggi's husband
Wiwid Gunawan	Anggi	Irwan's wife
Vonny Cornelia	Inge	Angelo helping people from a plane crash Tessar's mother
Ichard Coll	Tessar	Inge's son
Anissa Trihapsari	Benno Mother	Mr. RT's wife
Mieke Wijaya	Grandma Anggrek	Benno and Baron's grandmother
Feber Irsyaad	Baron	Benno's older brother
Michael Utomo	Nirwan Rajasa	Wanda's son
Calista Aqilah	Rizka Rajasa	Wanda's daughter
Cut Memey	Wanda Rajasa	Nirwan and Rizka's mother
Awwaliya Salsabila Facika	Nining	Putri's best friend
Jim Avicenna	Zaki	Zahra's older brother
Arij F.B	Siti	Mr. Ustadz's daughter Putri's best friend
Sultan Djorghi	Djarot	Criminals who kidnapped Putri and friend
Tri Ningtyas		Djarot's wife
Darren RK		

== Plot ==
Putri is a beautiful, sweet girl, who is mature for her age. My daughter lives with her father Mahmud, his mother, Sari, and grandmother Grandma Ida. One day, Mahmud led to a fire in the house of her employer, Jeffery, which causes Jeffery family, Dini, his wife, and Baby children died. Jeffry also seek to hold accountable Mahmud.

Mahmud who fear had left his family when Jeffry came. Jeffry then intend to take the daughter. But fortunately Sari and daughter managed to escape from the pursuing Jeffery to run into the woods. But an accident claimed the lives of Sari in the forest, so the daughter had to live alone with Grandma Ida. Before he died, Sari had to say farewell to the princess with great affection. Sari asked daughter not to be sad and always spread love to everyone. Sari was last tears. Miraculously, tears Sari was transformed into a beautiful crystal and shimmering. Apparently, the amount of affection for daughter Sari has touched the hearts of Angels. Angel came down to earth to protect the Putri through tears Sari, the transformed into a crystal. Jeffry had turned out to see it in disbelief. Jeffry was making plans to seize it from the Crystal Putri, to bring back his family who have died.

Originally daughter did not notice a change in him. He was just surprised to find a beautiful crystal in her bag. Putri had remembered the tales that often read Sari at night before sleeping Putri. But Grandma Ida reminded that it is only fiction. But when the second angel saved him again from venomous snake bites, the Putri was willing to not want to believe. Putri was glad of the presence of angels at his side and help him. He also summoned the angel by the name Bundadari. After that, it was always Putri Crystal store in the bag.

Putri was then undergo adventures with the help of Angels. Daughter with love and innocence also helped a lot of friends, neighbors in the village to solve the problems of their lives.

Concern grew when Mahmud's daughter secretly returned and complicate Grandma Ida and daughter. Angel was still faithful to help Putri resolve any problem.

== International broadcasts ==
Country	Channel	Language	Subtitle
Indonesia	RCTI	Indonesian	
Indonesia	SINDOtv	Indonesian	
Malaysia	MetroVision Channel 8 (1995-1999)	Indonesian	Malay
Malaysia	TV3	Indonesian	Malay
Brunei	RTB4 International	Indonesian	Malay
Singapore	TCS-5	Indonesian	English
Myanmar	Myanmar Television	Indonesian	Burmese
Brunei	MNC International	Indonesian	Malay
Malaysia	MNC International	Indonesian	Malay
Singapore	MNC International	Indonesian	English
Hong Kong	Wharf Drama Channel (1993-1996)	Indonesian	Cantonese
Hong Kong	STAR TV Mandarin Satellite Channel (1991-1993)	Indonesian	Chinese
Macau	Macau Television (1992-1996)	Indonesian	Cantonese

== Award ==
Year	Award	Categories	Nominations	Result
2012	KPI Awards	Free Soap-Opera Program	Putri Bidadari	Won
2013	Panasonic Gobel Awards	Soap-Opera	Putri Bidadari	Won
2013	Panasonic Gobel Awards	Television Program	Putri Bidadari	Won
2013	Panasonic Gobel Awards	Television Stars	Sandra Dewi	Won
2013	Panasonic Gobel Awards	Actor	Atalarik Syah	Won
2013	Panasonic Gobel Awards	Actress	Sandra Dewi	Won
2013	Panasonic Gobel Awards	Starred Actor	Ashraf Sinclair	Won
2013	Panasonic Gobel Awards	Starred Actress	Aura Kasih	Won
2013	Panasonic Gobel Awards	Talent Show	Qheyla Zavyera Valendro	Won
2013	Panasonic Gobel Awards	Lifetime Achievement Awards	Novia Ardhana	Won
2013	Panasonic Gobel Awards	Lifetime Achievement Awards	Annisa Trihapsari	Won
2013	Panasonic Gobel Awards	Big Inspiration Award	Sandra Dewi	Won
2013	Panasonic Gobel Awards	Slime Star	Sandra Dewi	Won
