= Gol & Gincu The Series =

Malaysian television series

- Created by: Rafidah Abdullah; Lina Tan
- Starring: Nur Fazura; Pierre Andre; Sazzy Falak; Ashraf Sinclair
- Opening theme: "Generasiku" by OAG
- Ending theme: "Teruja" by Ella
- Country of origin: Malaysia
- Original language: Malay
- No. of episodes: 26

Production
- Running time: 42 minutes

Original release
- Network: 8TV
- Release: 4 June 2006 – 30 September 2007

Gol & (Dan) Gincu (lit. 'Goalpost and Lipsticks') was a 2006 Malaysian TV series spin off from the 2005 film of the same title produced by Red Films and directed by Bernard Chauly, continuing upon the affairs of the all-female futsal team Bukan Team Biasa (lit. 'Not an Ordinary Team'). Its first season was first aired from 4 June till 27 August 2006 on 8TV and while its second and final season ran from 8 July to 30 September 2007. The first season of the series was also aired in Singapore on Suria from 26 December 2006 till 20 March 2007.

== Plot ==
Apart from their passion toward futsal, Putri and Reza make a lovely dating couple albeit their different background. Putri is a fashion student at Limkokwing who hails from an affluent family while Reza is a law student from Universiti Malaya who has to work part-time in the futsal court frequented by Putri's gang, to sustain himself and his education.

Ayu has been in a long crush on Reza since their first days as coursemates. Reza actually does not notice Ayu's feelings toward him, and when Ayu decides that the time has come to let it out on Reza, Putri appears to ruin her plans. Yet Ayu does not give up easily, plotting to break up Putri and Reza, while ensuring at the same time that she maintains friendship with her rival.

Reza begins to feel that perhaps he has been going out with a less-than-compatible romance partner, while dealing with his own personal inner demons from being HIV positive due to his past drug addiction. At the same time, Putri begins to face new problems beginning with her other best friend Mia deciding to drop out and marry a much older man against her parents' wishes, followed by her futsal teammates' preoccupation in their own personal problems, causing them to attend futsal training less frequently while her mother Datin Aina is depressed over the resurfacing of a mysterious man she knew from her past which is eventually revealed to be Putri's estranged real father.

But, unexpectedly Putri finds herself teaming up with her old rival Shasha and her teammates Zie, Sarah, J, Dayang and Ling. This is where Putri realises that when a bunch of girls unite, they can outdo just anything in their lives.

== Episode summaries ==
=== Season 1 ===
#	Title	First aired	Overview
1	Kau, Aku, Dia dan Mereka "You, Me, Him and Them"	4 June 2006	Shasha joins Putri in the same team and the two girls begin to put away their differences (akin to the movie). After Mia's parents disapproved of her relationship with Jeff, a man as old as her parents, she decided to flee with him and quit her studies, leaving her friends in a great shock, especially Putri.
2	Hari Ini Hari Engkau "Today is Your Day"	11 June 2006	Ayu plots to get her hands on Reza through a class assignment, with the wish to have him fall for her albeit knowing Reza being with Putri. Soon, Reza found himself spending less time with Putri, perhaps due to the workload in their hands. Meanwhile, Putri pursues Eddy who was on the way to Australia.
3	Perempuan Melayu Terakhir "the Last Malay Woman"	18 June 2006	Putri struggles to present her Malay-ness to maintain her ties with Reza, thinking that their different ways of life might threaten their romance. Meanwhile, J is selected to play for the state futsal team, and receives weight loss pills from Sarah without knowing that they contain banned substances.
4	Percayalah "Believe Me"	25 June 2006	Putri finds a necklace in Reza's bag by coincidence, thinking of it as a gift for her, until she realises it belongs to Ayu. Meanwhile, J's team suffered a setback after she was found having consumed banned substances. As a result, J blamed Sarah for what she caused her team to be disqualified.
5	Cinta Monyet "Puppy Love" (lit: "monkey love")	2 July 2006	Aina tries to keep a hauntingly dark secret away from Putri's knowledge. Meanwhile, Putri spends her time outdoors with her buddies since Mia's return and Jiji's visit to Kuala Lumpur. After Putri sends off Jiji in Puduraya, she meets a man, Marwan, just outside.
6	Jerangkung Dalam Almari "Skeletons in the Closet"	9 July 2006	Reza confesses to Putri with a shocking revelation of his state of health, while Aina struggled to banish Marwan from her house, hoping that he would never reveal her secret to Putri.
7	Hujan Di Tengah Hari "Rain in the Afternoon"	16 July 2006	Ayu makes the move on Reza who broke up with Putri recently upon her knowing of Reza's being HIV positive. Yet, he could not get Putri out of his mind or let Ayu to take her place in his heart.
8	Mungkin Nanti "Maybe Later"	23 July 2006	Puteri and her friends get lost in a forest where they camped in. Meanwhile, Ayu planned a luxurious romantic dinner with Reza to keep him happy and express her love to him. Yet, matters were made worse when he turned her down.
9	Diari Seorang Lelaki "A Man's Diary"	30 July 2006	Haikal shares his tormented childhood in his blog without realising that he was hooked on with Shasha who kept leaving him with messages of encouragement. At the same time Haikal fell into a bet with his friends who dared each him to take pictures of Shasha naked.
10	Di Antara Empat Dinding "Between Four Walls"	6 August 2006	Putri discovers that Marwan was her biological father who tried to abduct her from Datin Aina. Meanwhile, Sarah, Ling and Zie ended up behind bars after being caught in an anti-vice operation while recording at a brothel for an academic assignment.
11	Kiri Kanan Orang Bercinta "People Making Love Everywhere"	13 August 2006	Eddie goes out with another girl without Putri's knowledge. J's mother tried to match her with the son of a friend, though the man was not the type with interests on the opposite sex. Zie reunited with her childhood friend, Ikan, after years without seeing each other.
12	Pinang Dibelah Dua "An Identical Couple" (lit: "a betel nut split half")	20 August 2006	J fought herself into accepting her mother's marriage arrangements, wanting to express her true feeling to her mother. In a men's futsal match which had Reza and Eddy involved, Putri discovered Eddy's new flame.
13	Inikah Cinta "Is This Love"	27 August 2006	After watching a video of interviews with people with AIDS (which included Reza), Putri prepared for a fashion show in benefit of those unfortunate citizens. The plan did not run smoothly due to lack of support from her classmates; yet the BTB girls came to save the day. In the night of the event, Putri was assaulted with a mild acid pouring.

=== Season 2 ===
#	Title	First aired	Overview
1	Nanti "Later"	8 July 2007	News of Putri in the acid debacle makes it into the tabloid covers, leaving her and her mother in depression. Shasha gets upset upon knowing that Haikal, who moved to Jakarta, was enrolled at the University of Indonesia. Meanwhile, J graduates with a diploma and joined a company which imposed a conservative dress code.
2	Selamatkan Aku "Save Me"	15 July 2007	The Bukan Team Biasa gang come together to help Putri and her mother move to their new apartment. In the midst of the chaos, Reza misplaces his HIV medication. Meanwhile, Shasha pays Haikal a visit in Jakarta, but it was cut short by an urgent phone call from Kuala Lumpur. Meanwhile, J experiences trouble fitting in at her new workplace.
3	Cari Keluarga "Finding a Family"	22 July 2007	Putri sets her mother up on a date with Fauzi, one of her lecturers whom they meet during a poetry night, as well as babysits his daughter. Ling's father disapproves her date with a Malay man (Atoi), though he himself had a Malay girlfriend in his days of young. Shasha and Haikal set up an Internet dating session which did not turn up well. Meanwhile, Mia is shocked to hear her husband's polygamy idea.
4	Ke Penghujung Jalan "To the End of the Road"	29 July 2007	Putri and her gang plans a surprise for Reza who is in a charity cycling event in conjunction with an HIV/AIDS awareness campaign. Counting themselves in is the whole team, including a depressed Mia as a result of Jeff's polygamy idea. En route to the finish line in Temerloh, things did not go smoothly for both the BTB gang and Reza's troupe.
5	Kawan & Lawan "Friends & Foes"	5 August 2007	Aina takes Mia to a hospital for her check-up, and there they meet Eddy and his cancer-stricken mother. Putri finds a rival for her most popular girl title in Ratu, who transferred from Europe and challenged her to Project Runway Malaysia. In Jakarta, Haikal's homesickness results in a row with his Indonesian mother.
6	Jangan Berubah "Don't Change"	12 August 2007	Haikal paid Shasha a surprise visit which she didn't call for, while Aina found Reza's HIV+ pills in her kitchen cabinet and demanded Putri to break off from him. Meanwhile, Mia's parents demand her to divorce Jeff and have an abortion. The rivalry between Putri and Ratu intensifies at the Project Runway Malaysia auditions, but was put off in an anticlimactic manner. Ikan and Dayang's date turns into an awkward situation.
7	Bukalah Mata "Open Your Eyes"	19 August 2007	Fleeing from a fight between her estranged boyfriend Haikal and her new boss Irwan, Shasha ends up being run down by a truck and inside a coma in the hospital, much to the chagrin of Putri and the rest of the gang. Mia still could not take out of her mind her father's urge to have her baby aborted.
8	Putera Impian "Dream Prince"	26 August 2007	Shasha is finally discharged from hospital, while Mia finally decides to keep her baby. Reza treats Putri to a surprise visit to a horse ranch, but things do not go well when she met one of Reza's female acquaintances who worked there. Ikan and Dayang's second attempt on dating goes awry out of a miscommunication, while Zie and J squabble over a business deal.
9	Aku Terima "I Accept"	2 September 2007	Mia finally agrees to Jeff's polygamy idea and attends his bethrothal ceremony with Ruby, but not everything went smoothly. Reeling from the accident, Shasha develops a fear of crossing roads and almost resigned from her internship until boss Irwan lent a hand to overcome her phobia and begin her duties.
10	Pipit lawan Helang "Sparrow vs Eagle"	9 September 2007	Reza begins his internship and is paired with Ayu in the same company, giving the latter the chance to sever the bond between Reza and Putri, before setting her eyes on Ikan. Shasha discovers that a powerful businessman attempts to develop on reserved land and owned property and tries to halt it. J and Dayang join the One in a Million auditions; Dayang gets through but later declines.
11	Usaha Kita, Nasib Kita "Our Efforts, Our Luck"	16 September 2007	Reza is convinced that Ayu is cheating Ikan, but Ikan himself is not convinced of that and instead thinks Reza is threatening his relationship with Ayu. Shasha and Irwan leaked confidential information to a tabloid reporter, resulting in their immediate termination from the firm. Putri and gang hold a surprise baby shower for expectant mother Mia. After the party, Ling lost her handbag filled with her lottery winnings worth RM1mil in cash to snatch thieves.
12	Jerat "Trap"	23 September 2007	Mia finally conceives her baby son in the absence of her polygamic husband Jeff who is performing the umrah with his other wife in Mecca. Putri confesses to Aina that she is ready to be engaged, while Riki returns to Malaysia to propose to Aina. Meanwhile, Reza falls into Ayu's trap in which she deliberately gets them caught in the act of khalwat (close proximity) by religious authorities.
13	Jalan Yang Kupilih "The Path I Chose"	30 September 2007	Reza settles his khalwat problem with his sister to confront Ayu's conservative parents, while it was the combined with of the BTB who helped him out of the mess. At last, he and Putri are destined to be together. Meanwhile, Shasha mends her relationship with Haikal, while Mia's parents open their arms to her newborn. This is the series finale.

== Cast list ==
- Nur Fazura Sharifuddin – Putri
- Pierre Andre – Reza
- Sazzy Falak – Shasha
- Ashraf Sinclair – Eddy
- Melissa Maureen – Mia
- Razif Hashim – Haikal
- Mazlina Hassan – Ayu
- Rafidah Abdullah – Zie
- Zarina Zainoodin – Dayang
- Kartini Kamalul Arifin – Sarah
- Celina Khor – Ling
- Fasha Rahman – "J"

Fahmi Fadzil, the current Malaysia's minister for digital communication, played a minor role in Gol & Gincu too.
