= Sazzy Falak =

Malaysian actress and television presenter

- سازي فلك
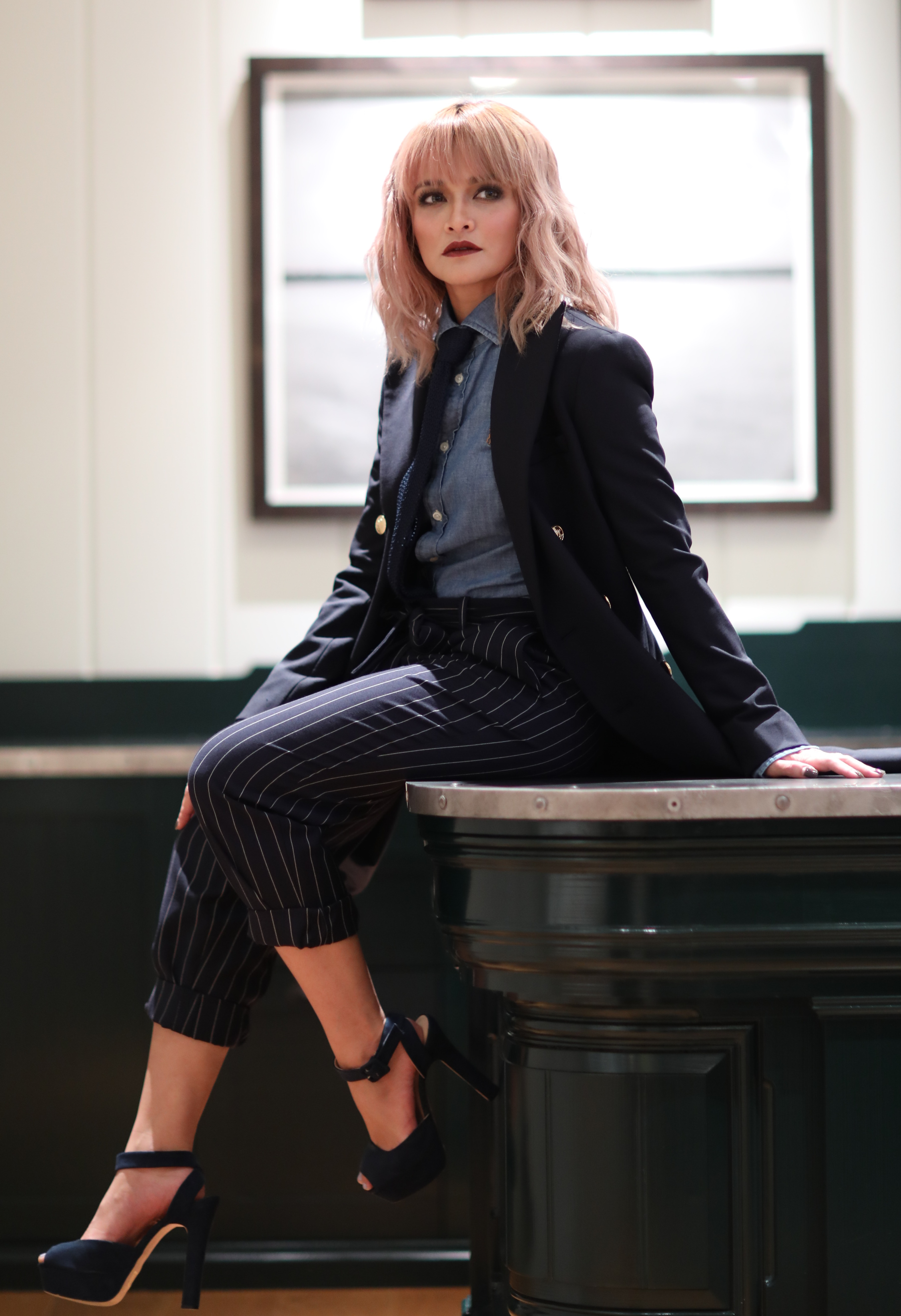
- Sazzy Falak in 2017
- Born: Sazlini Shamsul Falak; 10 March 1981 (age 45); Kuala Lumpur, Malaysia
- Occupations: Actress, TV host, entrepreneur
- Years active: 1999–present
- Spouse: Nazril Idrus (m. 2006)
- Children: 3
- Parents: Datuk Shamsul Falak Kadir (father); Datin Lilly Rahim (mother)

Sazlini binti Datuk Shamsul Falak (born 10 March 1981) or professionally known as Sazzy Falak is a Malaysian actress, TV host, entrepreneur and fashion icon. She is best known for her breakthrough role as Shasha in the 2005 film Gol & Gincu, for which she won the Best Supporting Actress Award at the 19th Malaysia Film Festival, as well as for being the host for Season 1 of the Asian spin-off to Style Network's hit US makeover series How Do I Look?.

Born and raised in Kuala Lumpur, Malaysia, Sazzy first ventured into the entertainment scene as a teenager in 2000, hosting TV3's Muzik Muzik programme alongside well-known actor and TV host, Benjy. In 2002, she became the DJ for local radio station WOW Fm, and also landed her first lead role in a telefilm, Piala Untuk Mama, directed by Osman Ali and broadcast on NTV7. Sazzy collaborated with him again the following year, acting in Surat Untuk Bulan. She later became the host of Beat TV on Astro Ria in 2004, followed by hosting MTV Juice in Singapore in 2005.

The success of the film Gol & Gincu spawned a TV series of the same name, in which Sazzy reprised her role for two seasons from 2006 to 2007. She also did voice-dubbing for the character Cappy for the Malay version of the animated film Robots on Star Movies whilst picking up hosting duties for Blast Off! on hitz.tv in 2006, and also starred in an Indo-Malaysian collaboration film Tipu Kanan Tipu Kiri.

== Early life ==
Sazzy was born on 10 March 1981, in Kuala Lumpur, to Datuk Shamsul Falak Kadir and Datin Lilly Rahim. She is of Arab, Minangkabau and Malays ancestry. She is the eldest of three siblings, and spent her childhood growing up in Kampung Melayu Ampang, Selangor.

Her parents divorced when she was 8 and later both remarried. Growing up under these circumstances forced her to assume a mature role at a young age, which Sazzy attributes her later success in life to. Her father emphasized education, which drove Sazzy to excel at school.

Sazzy was drawn to acting from a young age, and had her first lesson in theatre at 11 years old. In the following years, she received training from renowned actor, Joe Hasham.

== Career ==
Sazzy gained her first experience as a theater actress at the age of 11 years old when she received training by Joe Ha

Sazzy Falak in 2008

sham. Her first ventured into the arena of entertainment television in 2000 as a host of TV3 Muzik Muzik at the age of 18. In 2002, she starred in her first television for Piala Untuk Mama in a short film directed by Osman Ali on ntv7. She also host Beat TV on Astro Ria since 2004.

Sazzy also served as a marketing executive in an IT company, until 2003 when she resigned to become a full-time television star. Sazzy has also hosted MTV Juice in Singapore before handing over the task to Nur Fazura Sharifuddin in 2006.

Sazzy began acting in films and got a roles as Shasha in Gol & Gincu in 2005 and Gol & Gincu The Series for two consecutive seasons from 2006 to 2007. In conjunction with the Aidilfitri in 2006, Sazzy contribute to Cappy in voice dubbing English version for the animated film Robots on Star Movies. Sazzy hosts the Blast Off! in hitz.tv in late 2006 to early 2007. Sazzy starring a supporting role in KAMI movies. She also starred in Indonesian-Malaysian collaboration film Tipu Kanan Tipu Kiri.

In 2015, she host How Do I Look? Asia was a makeover show airing on Diva TV channel based on the American franchise reality television.

=== Business venture ===
She also founded ‘Street Fashion by Sazzy Falak’ which is a women's apparel label based in Kuala Lumpur.

== Personal life ==
Sazzy married financial coach Nazril Idrus on 8 November 2006. Nazril is the co-founder of LVG Consultants and Explosive Minds Asia and he is a celebrity in his own capacity, having appeared in advertisements, dramas and films. The couple reside in Damansara, Kuala Lumpur. Sazzy and Nazril have appeared alongside each other in a TV series called "Ada apa dengan Cinta". They appeared in a local reality dancing competition by Malaysia Pay-TV provider Astro in its show Astro Ria known as "Sehati Berdansa" and went all the way to the Grand Finals to finish runners up, despite being highly popular with viewers.

In July 2010, they received EH! Magazine's "Pasangan Selebriti Paling Di Minati" or "Favourite Celebrity Couple" voted by the public, pipped many other Malaysian Celebrity couples including Datuk Siti Nurhaliza and Datuk Khalid Jiwa, Que Haidar and Linda Jasmin, and Erra Fazira and Engku Emran. Sazzy and Nazril welcomed twin daughters Imaan Lily and Tiara Rose on 28 April 2011.

== Awards ==
- Best Supporting Actress – Film Festival Malaysia Ke-19 (2006) for her role in “Gol & Gincu”
- FHM's 100 Sexiest Women In The World 2005
- FHM's 100 Sexiest Women In The World 2006
- Most Beautiful Eyes - OK! Celeb Fest 2008
- Top 40 Under 40 2008 - Le Prestige

== Filmography ==
=== Film ===
| Year | Title | Role | Notes |
|---|---|---|---|
| 2005 | Gol & Gincu | Shasha | |
| 2006 | Robots | Cappy | Dubbing Bahasa Malaysia |
| 2008 | Tipu Kanan, Tipu Kiri | Rina | |
| 2008 | Sepi | Ida | Cameo appearances |
| 2009 | Jin Notti | Zulu | |
| 2010 | 4 Madu | Jane | |
| 2011 | Tolong Awek Aku Pontianak | Maya / Pontianak | |
| 2017 | Kamar Seksa | Kitty/Khaty | |
| 2018 | Gol & Gincu Vol: 2 | Shasha | |

=== Telemovie and TV Series ===
| Year | Title | Role | TV channel | Notes |
|---|---|---|---|---|
| 2002 | Piala Untuk Mama | | | Telemovie |
| 2004 | Surat Untuk Bulan | | | Telemovie |
| | Spanar Jaya Season 6 | | NTV7 | |
| 2006–2007 | Gol & Gincu The Series Season 1 & 2 | Shasha | 8TV | |
| 2007 | Kerana Karina Season 1, 2 & 3 | Sherina | gua.com.my | |
| 2008 | Doa Kamalia | Kamalia | TV2 | Telemovie |
| 2008 | GODA The Series | Sanya Salleh | | |
| | Apa Itu Cinta | | Astro Prima | |
| 2007 | Kami The Series | Alisya | 8TV | |
| | Hilang | | | |
| 2009 | Keliwon (Season 2) | Mona | TV3 | Episode: "Syiling Puaka" |
| 2009 | Warkah Terakhir: Rosli Dhoby | | Astro Citra | |
| 2013 | Sopi Sekurti | | Astro Warna | |
| 2014 | Warkah Syurga | Aida | Astro Prima | Telemovie |

=== TV Hosting ===
- Lets Talk About Her (Pilot) – TV2
- Muzik Muzik 2000 - TV3
- Cyberjaya Digital Video Competition Showcase – 8TV
- Anugerah Era Red Carpet 2004 - Astro Live
- Anugerah Era 2004 – Astro Live
- Anugerah Era Spotlite - Astro Live
- Beat TV – Astro Season 6 (52 episodes)
- Beat TV – Astro Season 7 (52 episodes)
- Konsert Pra Anugerah Era
- Anugerah Era Red Carpet 2005 – Astro (Live)
- Beat TV – Astro Season 8 (52 episodes)
- MTV Jus – MTV Asia (Sat, 7pm)
- Anugerah Era Red Carpet 2006 - Astro Live
- Anugerah Era Spotlite - Astro Live
- Film Festival Malaysia 2006 Award Red Carpet - Astro Live
- Force of Nature Jogjakarta - Live feed for 9 hours - Astro Ria
- Blast Off Season 3 – Hitz.tv Live
- Kuala Lumpur International Film Festival Awards Red Carpet (KLIFF) - Astro Live
- Rexona 24 hour Challenge - 8tv
- Ria Sentral - Astro Ria (52 Episodes)
- Malaysian Dream Girl 2008 - Reality Model Search
- Oh La La - TV9
- How Do I Look Asia
- Women Talk - TV3

=== Music video ===
| Year | Song title | Singer |
|---|---|---|
| 2005 | Tak Tahu | Adam |
| 2008 | Wicked Queen | Dragon Red |
| 2008 | Dem Girls | Caprice |

== Endorsements ==
- Bio Fair Skincare
- Clinique
- Darlie ASW Lime Mint - Print
- The Face of Maxis Dongeng Series – Raya Aidilfitri

== Guest appearances ==
- Award Presenter for Anugerah Era 2004
- Award Presenter for Asian Television Awards 2005 in Singapore
- Performed on stage for Film Festival Award 2006 -Dance Gol & Gincu
- Trek Selebriti bersama Sazzy Falak - Astro Ria
- Award Presenter for Anugerah Bintang Popular 2007
- AC Di Sini bersama Sazzy Falak, Yasmin Hani & Jimmy Shanley - Astro Ria
- Tanya Linda - Astro Ria
- Thursday Nite Live with Harith Iskandar -NTV7
- Quickie on 8tv (April) for Kerana Karina 2
- Hello on 2 (October) for Tipu Kanan Tipu Kiri Film
- Celebrity Chat - 8tv (October) for Kerana Karina 3
- Quickie on 8tv (October) for Kerana Karina 3
- Quickie on 8tv (December) for Acting Saved My Life! Teens Workshop
- Hello on 2 (December) for Acting Saved My Life! Teens Workshop

== Commercials ==
- Dumex
- Natea Hair Colour (Garnier - Loreal)
- Digi Prepaid
- Nestle Non-Stop
- Honda EX5
- Hitachi
- Fruitale
- Kit Kat
- LifeCella Orange Mask
- Nokia
- Laurier
- Clean & Clear
- Maxis
- Ribena
- AmBank
- Digi
- Hotlink (Maxis) Prepaid
- Enchanteur
