= Christien =

Christien is a unisex given name. Notable people with the name include:

- Christien Anholt (born 1971), English stage, television and film actor
- Christien Tinsley (born 1974), make-up artist

== See also ==
- Christian (disambiguation)
- Christine (disambiguation)
