= Françoise Huguier =

French photographer

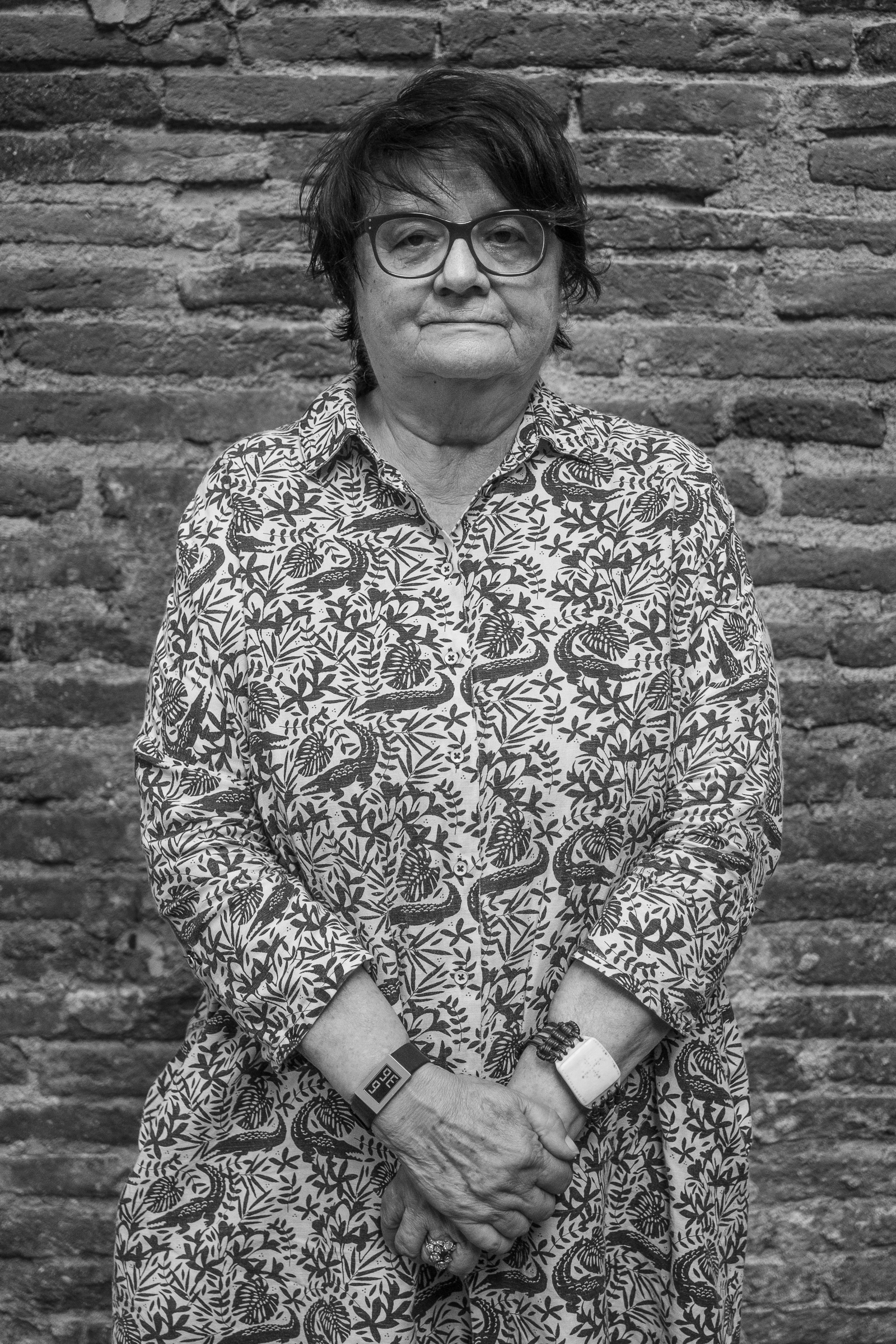
- Huguier in 2022
- Born: June 15, 1942 (age 82); Thorigny-sur-Marne, Île-de-France, France
- Known for: Photography

Françoise Huguier (born June 15, 1942, in Thorigny-sur-Marne, France) is a French photographer.

A great traveler, Africa as the subject of her first work: Sur les traces de l'Afrique fantôme ([Looking for traces of phantom Africa, inspired by the work of Michel Leiris, published by éditions Maeght in 1990. She was awarded a Villa Médicis hors les murs residency for this work.

In 1991, she discovered the photographers Seydou Keïta and Malick Sidibé (winner of the 2003 Hasselblad Award) and contributed to increasing recognition of their work. She founded the first Biennale de la photographie africaine (Biennale of African photography) in 1994 in Bamako.

She awarded a second Villa Médicis hors les murs laureate residency in 1993 for her book En route pour Behring (On the road to Bering) (éditions Maeght), a travel journal of a solo trip in Siberia. This work was exhibited in numerous festivals and galleries, and garnered her the 1993 World Press Photo prize ear.

In 1998, she exhibited at the Maison européenne de la photographie A l'Extrême (To the extreme), work undertaken over a few years in the South African province KwaZulu-Natal. In the same vein as this work, Actes Sud published her book Secrètes (Secrets), in 1999, about the intimate spaces of African women.

Her work involving the fashion world began with the runway shows she photographed twice a year, backstage and in workshops. The newspaper Libération started publishing her photographs beginning in 1983. Artistic directors of major magazines like Vogue , The New York Times Magazine, Women's Wear Daily, and Marie Claire hired her for fashion photo editorials. She also created ad campaigns for Thierry Mugler, Lanvin, and Christian Lacroix. Actes Sud also published her book Sublimes, the result of her work in the fashion world in the 1980s and 90s.

In 2001, she spent a few years in Saint Petersburg to report on communal apartments. A book of this work, Kommounalki, was published by Actes Sud in 2008. She received funding from the Centre National de la Cinématographie to direct a film related to these photographs, Kommounalka, released in 2008 by Les films d'Ici.

In 2004, she returned to Cambodia, where she was a prisoner of the Viêt Minh as a child. The book J'avais huit ans (I was eight) recounting this story was published in 2005 by Actes Sud. This was followed by an exhibition at the Rencontres Photographiques d'Arles.

In 2007, Jean-Luc Monterosso, director of the Maison européenne de la photographie, asked her to be one of the curators of the 2008 edition of the Mois de la Photo. In 2008, she was invited by Christian Lacroix, artistic director of the Rencontres Photographiques d'Arles, to an exhibition held in her honor. She was the subject of a major retrospective, Pince-moi, je rêve (Pinch me, I'm dreaming]) in 2014 at the Maison Européenne de la Photographie.

== Bibliography ==
- 1990: Sur les traces de l'Afrique fantôme, Editions Maeght
- 1993: En route pour Behring, Editions Maeght
- 1996: Secrètes, Actes Sud
- 1999: Sublimes, Actes Sud
- 2005: J'avais huit ans, Actes Sud
- 2008: Kommounalki, Actes Sud
- 2012: R.U., Trans Photographic Press
- 2013: Les Nonnes, Filigranes Editions (text by Gérard Lefort)
- 2014 : Au Doigt et à l'Oeil, Sabine Wespieser
