= Chelsia Ng =

Malaysian actress

- Born: Chelsia Ng; 25 December 1981 (age 44); Penang, Malaysia
- Occupations: Actress, singer-songwriter, model
- Years active: 1998—present
- Height: 168 cm (5 ft 6 in)

Chelsia Ng (Chinese: 伍家丽; Pe̍h-ōe-jī: Ngó͘ Ke-lē) is an actress from Malaysia.

== Biography ==
Penang-born Ng made her first step in the entertainment scene in the Malaysian English-language comedy Kopitiam as Rain, an assistant in Steven's (Lim) salon.

Besides Kopitiam, she was part of local teochew sitcom Homecoming as well as being a member of the supporting cast of Tin Geok Bin.

Ng had a role in the film Salon in 2005, for which she was left a nomination for Best Supporting Actress in the 19th Malaysia Film Festival the following year.

In 2006 Ng returned to television by playing Melody in Realiti. In 2008, she starred in Ghost and Ampang Medikal. Later on in 2009, she played the role of Yvonne who is the best friend of Miasara (Liyana Jasmay) in Afdlin Shauki's "Papadom".

== Filmography ==
- 2003: Kopitiam (TV Series)
- 2005: Salon
- 2008: Sepi
- 2009: Setem
- 2009: Papadom
- 2011: Appalam
- 2011: Vote!
- 2012: Small Mission Enterprise (SME)
- 2013: Tanda Putera
- 2013: Papadom 2
- 2014: Gila Baby
- 2017: J Revolusi
- 2017: You Mean the World to Me
- 2019: Babi!
- 2019: Simulacra 2
- 2021: Sa Balik Baju
- 2022: Kudeta
