= A House of Happiness =

- Directed by: JY Teng
- Starring: Richard Ng; Mimi Chu; Chan Fong; Cheryl Lee
- Distributed by: Mega Films Distribution Sdn Bhd
- Release date: 15 February 2018 (Malaysia)
- Running time: 99 minutes
- Country: Malaysia
- Language: Cantonese

A House of Happiness (Chinese: 一家親親過好年) is a 2018 Malaysian Cantonese-language film directed by JY Teng.
