= Aishah Sinclair =

Malaysian actress (born 1980)

- Born: Aishah Jennifer binti Mohamed Sinclair; 27 October 1980 (age 44); Wimbledon, London, England
- Education: Bachelor in Mass Communications (hons.) from Universiti Teknologi Mara
- Occupation(s): Actress, model, radio presenter, television host
- Spouse: Shaikh Abdul Shahnaz (m. 2006)
- Children: Soraya Ann (b.2008); Aina Elisabeth (b.2014)
- Relatives: Ashraf Sinclair (brother); Adam Sinclair (brother); Yuna Zarai (sister-in-law); Bunga Citra Lestari (sister-in-law)

Aishah Jennifer binti Mohamed Sinclair (born 27 October 1980 in Wimbledon, London, England) is a Malaysian actress, television host and radio announcer.

== Background ==
Sinclair was born to a pharmacist, Mohammed Anthony John Sinclair, who is British with Irish, English and Scottish ancestry, and Khadijah Abdul Rahman, who is of Malay descent. She had an older brother, actor Ashraf Sinclair who died of a heart attack in 2020, and a younger brother, Adam. Due to her father's career, Sinclair grew up in Croydon, Saudi Arabia, Lytham St Annes with her grandmother, and Cambridge before moving to Malaysia in 1986. She was a British citizen before becoming a Malaysian citizen when she was sixteen years old.

She holds a Bachelors in Mass Communication from Universiti Teknologi Mara.

== Career ==
Hosting

2005

- Life Traits (Season 1 & 2) RTM2
- Voice Your Choice 8TV

2006

- 8TV Quickie 8TV
- Red Carpet for Anugerah Juara Lagu 2007 TV3
- Rock Unite NTV7

2007

- Rock Unite NTV7
- 8TV Quickie 8TV

2008

- Venus NTV7
- So You Think You Can Dance 2 8TV
- Double Exposure - Photography reality show online

Acting

2005

- Cameo appearance in Gol & Gincu Movie
- Bujang Senang Movie

2006

- Cameo role in Gol & Gincu Season 1 Drama Series
- Realiti Drama Series

2008

- Hilang Telemovie
- Uncut, Untitled & Paper House Theatre

MODELLING

1998

- Pepsi TVC
- Philips MyWeb Infomercial
- Fair & Lovely TVC
- Twisties TVC
- Avon Catalogue Print
- Cataloque Shop Print

1999

- Cadbury TVC
- Jelita - Fashion Spread Magazine

2000

- Padini Authentic Print

2001

- Cataloque Shop Print

2002

- Loreal Hair Show Model
- Yamaha Motorcycle TVC
- Equal TVC
- 100 Plus TVC

2003

- Dutch Lady TVC
- Honda Motorcycle TVC
- Stabilo TVC

2004

- Remaja - Cover Magazine
- Female - 50 Most Gorgeous People Magazine

2005

- DiGi Print & Website

2006

- Jelita - Cover Magazine

2007

- Eh! - 20 Yang Paling Anggun Magazine
- Rapi Magazine - Cover Magazine
- Health & Beauty - Cover Magazine
- Frenz - Cover Magazine
- KLUE -Cover Magazine

2008

- Female - Cover Magazine
- Wanita - Cover Magazine
- Rapi - Cover Magazine
- Shape - Cover Magazine
- Olay Total Effect TVC & Ambassador

== Personal life ==
On 7 January 2006, Sinclair married Shaikh Abdul Shahnaz who is of Chinese and Indian-Muslim ancestry. The couple has two daughters, Soraya Ann (born 2008) and Aina Elisabeth (born 2014).
