= Malaysia Film Festival for Best Actor =

FFM Award for Best Actor
- Awarded for: Best Performance by an Actor in a Leading Role
- Country: Malaysia
- Presented by: National Film Development Council of Malaysia
- First award: Jins Shamsudin Tiada Esok Bagimu (1980)
- Currently held by: Zul Ariffin; Sangkar (2021)

The FFM Award for Best Actor is one of the Malaysia Film Festival Awards given to people working in the motion picture industry by the National Film Development Council of Malaysia, which are voted on by award-winning writers, filmmakers and movie columnists and writers within the industry.

== Winners and nominees ==
The list may be incomplete such as some of the names of the nominees and the roles portrayed especially during the early years of FFM Awards.

In the lists below, the winner of the award for each year is shown first, followed by the other nominees.

=== 1980s ===
Year	Actor	Film	Role(s)
1980; FFM 1
1980; FFM 1	Jins Shamsuddin	Tiada Esok Bagimu	Ghailan
1980; FFM 1	Dharma Harun Al Rashid	Adik Manja	Cikgu Azmi
1980; FFM 1	Jins Shamsuddin	Esok Masih Ada	ASP Zamri
1980; FFM 1	Mokhtaruddin	Pasung Puaka	
1980; FFM 1	Latif Ibrahim	Sumber Ilhamku	Nasir
1981; FFM 2
1981; FFM 2	Rahim Razali	Abang	Fuad Din
1981; FFM 2	Kuswadinata	Serampang Tiga	Indra
1981; FFM 2	M. Jamil	Dia Ibuku	Jamil
1981; FFM 2	Sidek Hussain	Toyol	Bachuk
1981; FFM 2	Zulkifli Zain	Sesejuk Airmata Ibu	Azlan
1982; FFM 3
1982; FFM 3	Ahmad Yatim	Pemburu	Khamis
1982; FFM 3	Alias Ahmad	Gelombang	
1982; FFM 3	Ed Osmera	Ribut Di Hujung Senja	
1982; FFM 3	Dharma Harun Al Rashid	Langit Petang	Hafiz
1982; FFM 3	Jins Shamsuddin	Bukit Kepong	Jamil Md Shah
1983; FFM 4
1983; FFM 4	Ahmad Mahmud	Dendam Dari Pusara	Dollah
1983; FFM 4	Alias Lantau	Mat Salleh Pahlawan Sabah	Mat Salleh
1983; FFM 4	Azmil Mustapha	Mekanik	Syamil
1983; FFM 4	Dharma Harun Al Rashid	Ke Medan Jaya	Sham
1983; FFM 4	Mokhtaruddin	Pertentangan	Ahmad Zabidi
1984; FFM 5
1984; FFM 5	Eman Manan	Matinya Seorang Patriot	Syaiful Shahban
1984; FFM 5	Ahmad Mahmud	Komplot	Galak
1984; FFM 5	A. Rahman Aminuddin	May 13	Rahman
1984; FFM 5	Shafie Mohammad	Melati Putih	Tempang
1984; FFM 5	Raffi Hussain	Tujuh Biang Keladi	Lebai Ismail
1985-86; FFM 6
1985-86; FFM 6	Azmil Mustapha	Ali Setan	Ali
1985-86; FFM 6	A.R. Badul	Pagar-Pagar Cinta	Bidin
1985-86; FFM 6	Rahim Razali	Tsu Feh Sofiah	Nik
1987; FFM 7
1987; FFM 7	Mustaffa Noor	Mawar Merah	Sufyan
1987; FFM 7	Eman Manan	Puteri	Iskandar
1987; FFM 7	Shukery Hashim	Rahsia	
1988-89; FFM 8
1988-89; FFM 8	A. R. Badul	Oh Fatimah	Rahmat
1988-89; FFM 8	Ahmad Fauzee	Kolej 56	Tengku Kamil
1988-89; FFM 8	Ahmad Yatim	Anak Sarawak	Azam
1988-89; FFM 8	Eman Manan	Yassin	Yassin
1988-89; FFM 8	Sabree Fadzil	Pelumba Malam	Rizal

=== 1990s ===
Year	Actor	Film	Role(s)
1990; FFM 9
1990; FFM 9	Ridzuan Hashim	Hati Bukan Kristal	Razif
1990; FFM 9	Azmil Mustapha	Driving School	Helmi
1990; FFM 9	Imuda	Mat Som	Mat Som
1990; FFM 9	Os	Adik	Os @ Adik
1990; FFM 9	Yusof Haslam	Bayangan Maut	Inspektor Razlan
1991-92; FFM 10
1991-92; FFM 10	Eman Manan	Bintang Malam	Yazid
1991-92; FFM 10	Azhar Sulaiman	Interlud	Mohd Haris
1991-92; FFM 10	Khalid Salleh	Penghujung Malam	Abdul Razak
1991-92; FFM 10	S. Sahlan	Yang Disayangi	
1991-92; FFM 10	Yusof Wahab	Syahadat	Ahmad Solihin
1993-94; FFM 11
1993-94; FFM 11	Nasir Bilal Khan	Perempuan, Isteri dan...	Amir
1993-94; FFM 11	Azhar Sulaiman	Abang 92	Imran Zainal Abidin
1993-94; FFM 11	Eman Manan	Femina	Pyan @ Sufyan
1993-94; FFM 11	Jalil Hamid	Wanita Bertudung Hitam	
1993-94; FFM 11	Shaharuddin Thamby	Pemburu Bayang	Zamri
1995; FFM 12
1995; FFM 12	Sidi Oraza †	Sayang Salmah	Hassan
1995; FFM 12	Aman Graseka	Cinta Kita	Arman
1995; FFM 12	Hani Mohsin	Jimi Asmara	Jimi Asmara
1995; FFM 12	Nasir Bilal Khan	Amok	Wan Man
1995; FFM 12	Zaidi Omar	Ringgit Kasorrga	Datuk Shah
1996-97; FFM 13
1996-97; FFM 13	Sidi Oraza	Layar Lara	Malek
1996-97; FFM 13	Awie	Merah	Ahmad Merah
1996-97; FFM 13	Yusof Mohamad	Panas	Paiman
1998-99; FFM 14
1998-99; FFM 14	Khalid Salleh †	Jogho	Mamat
1998-99; FFM 14	Awie	Bara	Amri
1998-99; FFM 14	Azri Iskandar	Perempuan Melayu Terakhir	Engku Leh
1998-99; FFM 14	Eman Manan	Lenjan	Amir
1998-99; FFM 14	Zack Idris	Penyair Malam	Mohd Adam

=== 2000s ===
Year	Actor	Film	Role(s)
2000-01; FFM 15
2000-01; FFM 15	Afdlin Shauki	Soal Hati	Ahmad Daniel
2000-01; FFM 15	Norman Hakim	Pasrah	Hafsham
2000-01; FFM 15	Rashidi Ishak	Mimpi Moon	Moonir Mansoor
2002-03; FFM 16
2002-03; FFM 16	Rosyam Nor	KL Menjerit	Shahrol Mohamad
2002-03; FFM 16	Afdlin Shauki	Soalnya Siapa?	Ahmad Daniel
2002-03; FFM 16	Norman Hakim	Idola	Muqriz
2004; FFM 17
2004; FFM 17	Eman Manan	Buai Laju-Laju	Amran
2004; FFM 17	Afdlin Shauki	Buli	Nordin
2004; FFM 17	Azri Iskandar	Pontianak Harum Sundal Malam	Marsani
2004; FFM 17	Nam Ron	Paloh	Ahmad
2004; FFM 17	Rosyam Nor	Berlari Ke Langit	Indera Che Muda
2005; FFM 18
2005; FFM 18	Zamarul Hisham	Di Ambang Misteri	Coke
2005; FFM 18	Adlin Aman Ramlie	Puteri Gunung Ledang	Sultan Mahmud Syah
2005; FFM 18	M. Nasir	Puteri Gunung Ledang	Hang Tuah
2005; FFM 18	Ng Choo Seong	Sepet	Jason Leong
2005; FFM 18	Rosyam Nor	Gangster	Legau, Rosli, Nala
2006; FFM 19
2006; FFM 19	Afdlin Shauki	Buli Balik	Nordin
2006; FFM 19	Hans Isaac	Persona Non Grata	Ben
2006; FFM 19	Que Haidar	KL Menjerit 1	Ku Idzham
2006; FFM 19	Rosyam Nor	Bilut	Yazid
2006; FFM 19	Rusdi Ramli	Pontianak Harum Sundal Malam 2	Razali Marsani & Jaya
2007; FFM 20
2007; FFM 20	Rusdi Ramli	Waris Jari Hantu	Shariman Abdul Rahman/Sharina Abdul Rahman
2007; FFM 20	Afdlin Shauki	Sumo-lah	Ramlee
2007; FFM 20	Pierre Andre	Jangan Pandang Belakang	Dharma
2007; FFM 20	Ramli Hassan	The Red Kebaya	Latiff
2007; FFM 20	Rosyam Nor	Syaitan	Muslim
2008; FFM 21
2008; FFM 21	Rosyam Nor	Kala Malam Bulan Mengambang	Salleh Mat Piah
2008; FFM 21	Afdlin Shauki	Sepi	Adam
2008; FFM 21	Adlin Aman Ramlie	Susuk	Dukun Dewangga
2008; FFM 21	Farid Kamil	Anak Halal	Indera Putera Hisyam
2008; FFM 21	Eman Manan	Wayang	Tok Dalang Awang Lah
2009; FFM 22
2009; FFM 22	Afdlin Shauki	Papadom	Sa'adom
2009; FFM 22	Awal Ashaari	Syurga Cinta	Irham
2009; FFM 22	Mahesh Jugal Kishor	Talentime	Mahesh
2009; FFM 22	Que Haidar	Maut	JJ
2009; FFM 22	Rashidi Ishak	Setem	Sidik

=== 2010s ===
Year	Actor	Film	Role(s)
2010; FFM 23
2010; FFM 23	Bront Palarae	Belukar	Nik
2010; FFM 23	Esma Daniel	Santau	Halim
2010; FFM 23	Farid Kamil	Legenda Budak Setan	Kasyah Khairudin
2010; FFM 23	Syamsul Yusof	Evolusi KL Drift 2	Zack
2010; FFM 23	Zulhuzaimy Marzuki	Haq	Haqim Ibrahim
2011; FFM 24
2011; FFM 24	Shaheizy Sam	Kongsi	Temulak
2011; FFM 24	Awie	Hantu Kak Limah Balik Rumah	Hussin
2011; FFM 24	Remy Ishak	Nur Kasih The Movie	Adam Hj Hassan
2011; FFM 24	Syamsul Yusof	KL Gangster	Shark
2011; FFM 24	Zahiril Adzim	Senjakala	Arman
2012; FFM 25
2012; FFM 25	Faizal Hussein	Bunohan	Ilham Ibrahim
2012; FFM 25	Pekin Ibrahim	Bunohan	Abu Bakar Ibrahim
2012; FFM 25	Shaheizy Sam	Songlap	Adam
2012; FFM 25	Shaheizy Sam	Saya Amat Mencintaimu (S.A.M)	Sam
2012; FFM 25	Zahiril Adzim	Bunohan	Adil Ibrahim / Bunga Lalang
2013; FFM 26
2013; FFM 26	Rusdi Ramli	Tanda Putera	Abdul Razak Hussein
2013; FFM 26	Azri Iskandar	Penanggal	Syed Yusuf Al-Attas
2013; FFM 26	Bront Palarae	Psiko Pencuri Hati	Sidi
2013; FFM 26	Faizal Hussein	Longkai	Badarudin
2013; FFM 26	Syed Hussein	Psiko Pencuri Hati	Dr. Khairil
2014-15; FFM 27
2014-15; FFM 27	Lee Sai Peng	The Journey	Uncle Chuan
2014-15; FFM 27	Wan Hanafi Su	Lelaki Harapan Dunia	Pak Awang
2014-15; FFM 27	Awie	Dollah Superstar	Dollah
2014-15; FFM 27	Bront Palarae	Terbaik Dari Langit	Berg
2014-15; FFM 27	Que Haidar	Ophilia	Ozi Gandum

Note:
1. (†) indicates the winner of the Asia Pacific Film Festival
2. (‡) indicates the nomination of the Asia Pacific Film Festival

== List of Best Actor winners by age ==
#	Actor	Place of born	Film	Date of birth	Date of award	Age upon receiving award	Date of death	Lifespan	Notes
1	Jins Shamsuddin	Perak	Tiada Esok Bagimu	November 5, 1935	April 13, 1980	44 years, 160 days	March 1, 2017	81 years, 116 days	
2	Rahim Razali	Perak	Abang	July 3, 1939	April 12, 1981	41 years, 283 days		87 years, 137 days	
3	Ahmad Yatim	Kuala Lumpur	Pemburu	January 1, 1950	November 28, 1982	32 years, 331 days		76 years, 320 days	
4	Ahmad Mahmud	Negeri Sembilan	Dendam Dari Pusara	March 17, 1927	December 11, 1983	55 years, 256 days	August 27, 2008	81 years, 163 days	
5	Eman Manan	Terengganu	Matinya Seorang Patriot	January 1, 1958	December 15, 1984	26 years, 349 days		68 years, 320 days	(1) of (3)
6	Azmil Mustapha	Kuala Lumpur	Ali Setan	January 1, 1952	December 14, 1986	34 years, 347 days		74 years, 320 days	
7	Mustaffa Noor	Selangor	Mawar Merah	January 1, 1953	December 6, 1987	34 years, 339 days	January 5, 1990	37 years, 4 days	
8	A. R. Badul	Johor	Oh Fatimah!	November 2, 1949	September 9, 1989	39 years, 311 days		77 years, 15 days	
9	Ridzuan Hashim	Kuala Lumpur	Hati Bukan Kristal	May 19, 1964	June 2, 1991	27 years, 14 days		62 years, 182 days	
10	Eman Manan	Terengganu	Bintang Malam	January 1, 1958	November 17, 1992	34 years, 321 days		68 years, 320 days	(2) of (3)
11	Nasir Bilal Khan	Negeri Sembilan	Perempuan, Isteri dan...	January 1, 1960	June 17, 1994	34 years, 167 days		66 years, 320 days	
12	Sidi Oraza	Penang	Sayang Salmah	October 31, 1965	November 5, 1995	30 years, 5 days		61 years, 17 days	(1) of (2)
13	Sidi Oraza	Penang	Layar Lara	October 31, 1965	December 28, 1997	32 years, 58 days		61 years, 17 days	(2) of (2)
14	Khalid Salleh	Johor	Jogho	January 11, 1952	November 7, 1999	47 years, 300 days		74 years, 310 days	
15	Afdlin Shauki	Kuala Lumpur	Soal Hati	May 19, 1971	August 5, 2001	30 years, 78 days		55 years, 182 days	(1) of (3)
16	Rosyam Nor	Kedah	KL Menjerit	March 1, 1967	April 19, 2003	36 years, 49 days		59 years, 261 days	(1) of (2)
17	Eman Manan	Terengganu	Buai Laju-Laju	January 1, 1958	June 26, 2004	46 years, 177 days		68 years, 320 days	(3) of (3)
18	Zamarul Hisham	Johor	Di Ambang Misteri	March 9, 1971	July 17, 2005	34 years, 130 days		55 years, 253 days	
19	Afdlin Shauki	Kuala Lumpur	Buli Balik	May 19, 1971	August 13, 2006	35 years, 86 days		55 years, 182 days	(2) of (3)
20	Rusdi Ramli	Selangor	Waris Jari Hantu	June 16, 1970	August 3, 2007	37 years, 48 days		56 years, 154 days	(1) of (2)
21	Rosyam Nor	Kedah	Kala Malam Bulan Mengambang	March 1, 1967	August 9, 2008	41 years, 161 days		59 years, 261 days	(2) of (2)
22	Afdlin Shauki	Kuala Lumpur	Papadom	May 19, 1971	August 8, 2009	38 years, 82 days		55 years, 182 days	(3) of (3)
23	Bront Palarae	Sabah	Belukar	September 27, 1978	October 24, 2010	32 years, 27 days		48 years, 51 days	
24	Shaheizy Sam	Selangor	Kongsi	September 4, 1982	November 20, 2011	29 years, 77 days		44 years, 74 days	
25	Faizal Hussein	Kuala Lumpur	Bunohan	May 31, 1967	March 2, 2013	45 years, 275 days		59 years, 170 days	
26	Rusdi Ramli	Selangor	Tanda Putera	June 16, 1970	November 1, 2014	44 years, 138 days		56 years, 154 days	(2) of (2)
27	Lee Sai Peng	Sarawak	The Journey	c. 1941	September 5, 2015	c. 75 years		c. 84–85 years	
#	Actor	Place of born	Film	Date of birth	Date of award	Age upon receiving award	Date of death	Lifespan	Notes

Note:
- Place of born does not represent the nationality since all nominees and winners must be a Malaysian citizen.
- Age count is upon winning and not upon filming.
