= List of Malaysian films of 2007 =

This is a list of Malaysian films produced and released in 2007. Most of the film are produced in the Malay language, but there also a significant number of films that are produced in English, Mandarin, Cantonese, Hokkien and Tamil.

== 2007 ==
=== January – March ===
| Opening | | Title | Director | Cast | Genre | Notes | Ref. |
|---|---|---|---|---|---|---|---|
| J A N U A R Y | 25 | Syaitan | Badarudin Azmi | Rosyam Nor, Que Haidar, Lisdawati, Liyana Jasmay | Horror | | |
| F E B R U A R Y | 8 | Qabil Khushry Qabil Igam | Zaili Sulan | Rusdi Ramli, Erra Fazira, Hans Isaac, Ziana Zain, Fauziah Nawi, Rahim Razali, Mak Jah, Maimon Mutalib, Hisham Ahmad Tajuddin | Drama | | |
| F E B R U A R Y | 18 | Puaka Tebing Biru | Osman Ali | Nasha Aziz, Umie Aida, Fahrin Ahmad, Sharifah Amani, Mislina Mustaffa, Corinne Adrienne | Horror / Mystery | | |
| M A R C H | 8 | Mukhsin | Yasmin Ahmad | Shafie Naswip, Sharifah Aryana, Sharifah Aleya, Adibah Nor, Taiyuddin Bakar, Mislina Mustaffa | Comedy / Drama / Romance | | |
| M A R C H | 22 | Chermin | Zarina Abdullah | Natasha Hudson, Deanna Yusof, Farid Kamil, Khatijah Tan, Maimon Mutalib | Horror / Mystery | | |

=== April – June ===
| Opening | | Title | Director | Cast | Genre | Notes | Ref. |
|---|---|---|---|---|---|---|---|
| A P R I L | 5 | Jangan Pandang Belakang | Ahmad Idham | Pierre Andre, Intan Ladyana | Horror / Mystery | Metrowealth Movies Production | |
| A P R I L | 5 | The Bird House | Khoo Eng Yow | | Drama | Mandarin- and Hokkien-language film | |
| A P R I L | 19 | Zombi Kampung Pisang | Mamat Khalid | Awie, Que Haidar, AC Mizal | Horror / Comedy | Tayangan Unggul | |
| M A Y | 10 | Sumolah | Afdlin Shauki | Afdlin Shauki, Inthira Charoenpura, Gurmit Singh, Awie, Patrick Teoh, Radhi Khalid, Gavin Yap, Terry Gallyot, Ben Tan, Mohd Afif, Kartina Aziz, Din Beramboi | Drama / Comedy | Vision Works | |
| M A Y | 10 | Before We Fall in Love Again | James Lee | Len Siew Mee, Pete Teo, Amy Len, Chye Chee Keong | Drama / Romance | Doghouse 73 Pictures-Da Huang Pictures-October Pictures co-production Mandarin-language film | |
| M A Y | 10 | Things We Do When We Fall In Love | James Lee | Loh Bok Lai, Len Siew Mee | Drama / Romance | Da Huang Pictures; Mandarin-language film | |
| M A Y | 31 | Waris Jari Hantu | Shuhaimi Baba | Maya Karin, Azean Irdawaty, Rusdi Ramli, Kavita Sidhu, Nanu Baharuddin | Horror / Drama | Pesona Pictures | |
| J U N E | 28 | Diva | Sharad Sharan | Ning Baizura, Jeremy Thomas, Adam, Awal Ashaari, Jessica Iskandar, AC Mizal, Balkisyh Semundur Khan, Shenny Andrea, Fauziah Nawi, Pushpa Narayan | Musical / Drama | Astro Shaw-Tarantella Pictures co-production | |

=== July – September ===
| Opening | | Title | Director | Cast | Genre | Notes | Ref. |
|---|---|---|---|---|---|---|---|
| J U L Y | 5 | Chalanggai | Deepak Kumaran Menon | Amir Muhammad, Gandhi Nathan, Dhaarshini Sankran | Drama / Comedy | OneHundredEye; English-, Mandarin-, Malay- and Tamil-language film | |
| J U L Y | 12 | Cinta Yang Satu | | Zul Huzaimy, Siti Elizad, Sharifah Sofea, Harun Salim Bachik, Nabila Huda | Comedy / Romance | | |
| J U L Y | 26 | Haru Biru | | Adlin Aman Ramlie | Drama | | |
| A U G U S T | 9 | Kayangan | | Fazura, Teuku Zacky Azwar, Bienda | Comedy / Romance | | |
| A U G U S T | 9 | Hidden Summer in My Heart | Felix Tan | Gabe Ng, Yew Lan | Drama / Romance | Dreamteam Studio | |
| A U G U S T | 23 | Impak Maksima | | Eizlan Yusof | Action / Romance | | |
| S E P T E M B E R | 7 | Pool | Chris Chong Chan Fui | | Experimental short | Canadian co-production | |
| S E P T E M B E R | 20 | Note of Love | | | Drama / Romance | | |

=== October – December ===
| Opening | | Title | Director | Cast | Genre | Notes | Ref. |
|---|---|---|---|---|---|---|---|
| O C T O B E R | 13 | Otai | | | Comedy / Romance / Family | | |
| O C T O B E R | 13 | Budak Lapok | Anwardi Jamil | Vanida Imran | Animation / Comedy | Based on Bujang Lapok (1957) | |
| O C T O B E R | 25 | 1957: Hati Malaya | Shuhaimi Baba | Adlin Aman Ramlie, Maya Karin, Nanu Baharuddin | Patriotism / Historical | | |
| N O V E M B E R | 1 | 9 September | | | Romance / Comedy | | |
| N O V E M B E R | 15 | Misteri Orang Minyak | | Sharifah Sofea, Jobot Mehran, Fizz Fairuz, Fauzi Nawawi | Horror / Mystery | | |
| N O V E M B E R | 29 | Nana Tanjung 2 | | Shaffii Jaafar, Saiful Apek, Fasha Sandha, Waheeda, Ainul Aishah, Sheila Mambo, Jehan Miskin, Mohd Hafiz | Romance / Family / Comedy | | |
| D E C E M B E R | 13 | Anak Halal | Osman Ali | Farid Kamil, Remy Ishak, Maya Karin, Fasha Sandha, Rosyam Nor, Bront Palarae, Raja Farah | Crime / Drama / Action | Tayangan Unggul | |
| D E C E M B E R | 20 | Flower in the Pocket | Liew Seng Tat | | Drama / Romance | Da Huang Pictures; Mandarin-, Cantonese- and Malay-language film | |

== See also ==
- 2007 in Malaysia
