= Chew Kin Wah =

Malaysian actor of Chinese descent

Anuar Chew Kin Wah
- 周堅華
- Born: 30 September 1965 (age 61); Ipoh, Perak, Malaysia
- Occupation: Actor
- Years active: 1993–present

Anuar Chew bin Abdullah (né Chew Kin Wah, Chinese: 周堅華; born 30 September 1965) is a Malaysian actor of Chinese descent. In June 2018, he was listed as one of the 10 top Malaysian actors who gain recognition internationally by Harian Metro.

Born and raised in Ipoh, Perak, Kin Wah starting his acting career in 1993. He appear in ntv7's longest-running television sitcom Kopitiam, co-starring Joanna Bessey, Rashid Salleh, and Mano Maniam.

Kin Wah converted to Islam in 2013 and adopted the Muslim name Anuar Chew or Anuar Abdullah.

== Filmography ==
=== Films ===
Year	Title	Role	Notes
2001	Snipers	Ah Wai	
2005	Salon	Mr. Chin	
2007	1957: Hati Malaya	H. S. Lee	
2007	Blue Roof		Short film
2008	Susuk	Lee	
2009	Setem	Piranha Lim	
2009	At the End of Daybreak	Ying's father	
2010	Belukar	TKO	
2011	Kongsi	Jimmy	
2012	Chantek	Sam O	
2012	Cinta Kura Kura	Mr. Lim	
2012	8 Jam	Chief Ah Long	
2012	29 Februari	Mr. Ho	
2012	Hantu Kapcai		
2012	The Collector	Inspector Lim	
2013	Tanda Putera	Tan Chong Chor	
2013	Ular	JC	
2013	Kolumpo	Kedai Mamak Customers 4 / DJ Radio	Special appearance
2014	Take Me To Dinner	Allan	
2014	River of Exploding Durians	Ming's father	
2014	In Between Floors	Voice of God	
2015	Jejak Warriors	Foo Sai Yuk	
2015	Bravo 5	Commander Lim Yatt	
2016	Pekak	Doctor	
2016	My Stupid Boss	Mr. Kho	
2016	Interchange	Heng	
2016	Cek Toko Sebelah	Koh Afuk	
2017	Kimchi Untuk Awak	Pak Dani	
2017	Surat Kecil Untuk Tuhan	Bapa Martin	
2017	Susah Sinyal	Ko Chandra	
2018	Dukun	Angus Lim	
2018	Terbang: Menembus Langit	Bapa Onggy	
2018	Dimsum Martabak	Koh Ah Yong	
2018	One Two Jaga	James	
2018	A Man Called Ahok	Kin Nam	
2019	My Stupid Boss 2	Mr. Kho	
2019	This Earth of Mankind	Babah Ah Tjong	
2019	Susi Susanti - Love All	Tong Sin Fu	
2019	Rise to Power: KLGU	Dato' Francis Tan	
2020	Prebet Sapu	Indonesian Passenger	
2021	Hantu Bonceng 2.0	Mr. Wong	
2022	Kongsi Raya	Long Feng	
2022	The Assistant	Kuan	
2022	Juang	Mr. Wu	
2022	Seratus	Lorry Driver	Cameo appearance
2022	Cek Toko Sebelah 2	Koh Afuk	
2023	Geng Sakau Vs Hantu Ting Tong	Uncle KK	
2024	Rain Town	Choo Kam Wah	
2024	Lubuk		
2024	Baik Punya Ah Long	Ah Long	
2024	The Shadow Strays	Handler	
2025	Perang Kota	Aji	
2025	Abah Saya, Uncle Mike	Mr. Tong	
2025	Agak Laen: Menyala Pantiku!	Koh Acim	
2025	The Fox King	Uncle Lonny	

=== Television series ===
Year	Title	Role	TV channel	Notes
1997–2003	Kopitiam	Kee Tat	NTV7	
2007	KAMI The Series	Bapa Adii	8TV	
2009	Tower 13		TV3	Guest star
2010	A gURLs wURLd	Mr. Lee	Nine Network	7 episodes
2013	Love You Mr. Arrogant	Raymond	TV3	Malay telenovela, based on the 2011 novel of the same name
2014	Kusinero Cinta	Chef Rio	Astro Mustika HD	
2016	Marco Polo (Season 2)	Song Loyalist 1	Netflix	1 episodes
2017	Dendam Aurora	Michael	Astro Ria	
2017	Mandatori	Captain David	Astro First Exclusive	
2018	Gantung The Series	School Principals	Astro First Exclusive	
2018–2019	Cek Toko Sebelah: The Series	Koh Afuk	HOOQ	2 episodes
2019	Aurora Aisyah	Ah Chong	TV1	
2019–2020	Cek Toko Sebelah: Babak Baru	Koh Afuk	HOOQ, Netflix	Due to HOOQ's closure, the series moved to Netflix
2020	The Bridge (Season 2)	Wong Ping Chuan	Viu/HBO Asia	
2021	Scammer	Wong	Astro Ria	
2022	Cek Toko Sebelah the Series: Ada Lawan Baru	Koh Afuk	Prime Video	
2023	Legenda Putri Qaseh	Tabib Chan Taik Tak	Astro Ceria	
2023	Metro Crimes Series: Siapa Lelaki Itu?	Teon Chai	Tonton	

=== Telemovie ===
Year	Title	Role	TV channel
2013	The Hong Kong Affair	Wai Jo	Das Erste
2014	Mentari Terbit Lagi	Simon	TV Alhijrah
2015	Solatku Hidupku Matiku		Astro Oasis
2016	Rongples Rongtaim	Alan	Astro Citra
2021	Hello Suria		Awesome TV
2024	The Lion Girl	David	Astro Ria

=== Television ===
Year	Title	Role	TV channel
2008	Malaysiantalents.com	Himself	Gua.com.my

== Awards and nominations ==
Year	Award	Category	Nominated works	Result
2014	Anugerah Skrin 2014	Pelakon Lelaki Terbaik (Drama)	Mentari Terbit Lagi	Nominated
2016	Anugerah i-Cinema	Aktor Peran Pendukung Terbaik	My Stupid Boss	Nominated
2017	Anugerah i-Cinema	Aktor Peran Pendukung Terbaik	Cek Toko Sebelah	Nominated
2017	Festival Film Tempo	Aktor Pendukung Pilihan Tempo	Cek Toko Sebelah	Won
2017	Indonesian Box Office Movie Awards 2017	Pemeran Pendukung Pria Terbaik	Cek Toko Sebelah	Won
