= Kee Thuan Chye =

Malaysian actor

- 紀傳財
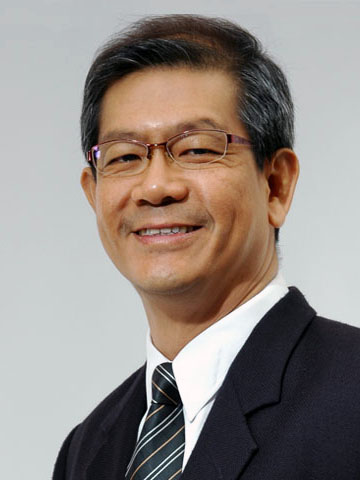
- Born: 25 May 1954 (age 72); Penang, Federation of Malaya
- Occupations: Journalist, editor, author, playwright, actor, and civil liberty advocate
- Spouse: Lim Choy Wan
- Children: Soraya Sunitra Kee Xiang Yin (daughter), and Jebat Arjuna Kee Jia Liang (son)
- Awards: The Annexe Heroes Freedom of Expression Awards 2008

Chinese name
- Traditional Chinese: 紀傳財
- Simplified Chinese: 纪传财
Transcriptions
Yue: Cantonese
- Jyutping: Gei2 Cyun4 Coi4
Southern Min
- Hokkien POJ: Kí Thoân-châi
- Tâi-lô: Kí Thuân-tsâi

Kee Thuan Chye (born 25 May 1954) is a Malaysian actor, dramatist, poet and journalist. Acting in theatre, films, and on television for more than 40 years, he continues to do so. A noted civil rights activist, he would express in his plays whatever he could not express through the newspapers under Malaysia's repressive Printing Presses and Publications Act (PPPA). For speaking out without fear or favour, Kee was among the first recipients of The Annexe Heroes Freedom of Expression Awards when it was launched in 2008.

Although social reengineering under the New Economic Policy had already begun after the 13 May Incident of 1969, it became more pronounced after Mahathir Mohamad became Prime Minister in 1981. At the New Straits Times, Kee Thuan Chye received numerous memos from his editor-in-chief for trying to push the parameters and opening up public discourse on what were deemed 'sensitive' issues. Firmly believing that the responsibility of a journalist to the public is to inform them of the truth, he had to battle with his superiors, and as a consequence, he was often punished, marginalised, and shut out. In 1988, Kee received his master's degree in drama from the University of Essex after being awarded a British Council Fellowship for postgraduate studies in England.

In 2001, Kee Thuan Chye became an associate editor of The Star in Kuala Lumpur, creating and editing the English column, Mind Our English, until retirement in May 2009. His Sunday Star column, Playing The Fool, which he began in April 2007, ran for only two installments before it was cancelled. In his inaugural article, Kee had written that he would be speaking out frankly on social and political issues, without fear or favour. His second article, hitting out at racial discrimination in Malaysia, was published, but when it came to his third article, the editors got jittery and suppressed it. The Star finally decided to terminate the column after Kee submitted his fourth article.

== Civil rights advocacy ==
Kee Thuan Chye's political awakening began when he could not afford to pursue his master's degree at Universiti Sains Malaysia, his alma mater, unless he had a tutor's position. He applied for the post, and although he was the top student in his class, the job was given to someone else. Kee then joined the now-defunct National Echo as literary editor, where he created the page Culture Scene and wrote editorials on political and other issues. Moving from Penang to Kuala Lumpur to join the New Straits Times in the late 1970s, he saw more clearly how race had been politicised to divide the people.

What Kee Thuan Chye could not express through the newspaper, he eventually expressed in his plays. 1984 Here and Now which spoke out frankly against Big Brother and institutionalised racial discrimination, played to full houses in 1985.

In the aftermath of the 2008 general elections, Kee Thuan Chye rushed out his book March 8: The Day Malaysia Woke Up in a record three months, due to the topicality of the subject matter. This was followed by March 8: Time for Real Change in 2010.

Between 2008 and 2018, Kee wrote a total of 10 books about the Malaysian political scene as part of his attempts to create awareness among Malaysians of the need for political change and a better Malaysia.

On May 9, 2018, the incumbent coalition, Barisan Nasional, was unexpectedly voted out after having held power for 61 years. Kee credits the results largely because of the efforts put in by Malaysians who wanted change and worked hard to make it come about.

To mark the occasion, Kee wrote a thoroughly researched account documenting the political developments leading up to the 14th general election, tracing events from the 13th general election onward. The book examines the broader shift in Malaysian public sentiment during this period, culminating in the defeat of Barisan Nasional..

The book is entitled The People's Victory.

== Filmography ==
=== Films ===
Year	Title	Role	Notes
2025	‘The Line’	Papa	One of four films in the omnibus Dead Echoes a.k.a. K4RMA
2025	Terbang	Dr Beh	Directed by Chiu Keng Guan
2015	Foundation	Father	Short film made for Cine 65 Singapore competition
2008	Sell Out!	CEO 1	Directed by Yeo Joon Han (Amok Films)
2007	1957 Hati Malaya	Tan Cheng Lock	Directed by Shuhaimi Baba (Pesona Pictures)
2004	Ah Lok Kafe: The Movie	Char Koay Teow	Directed by Anwardi Jamil
2001	Snipers	Mr. Tan	Written and directed by James Lee
2000	Lips to Lips	Scrabble Man	Written and directed by Amir Muhammad
1999	Anna and the King	Second Judge	Directed by Andy Tennant, starring Jodie Foster (Twentieth Century Fox)
1999	Entrapment	Trader #1	Directed by Jon Amiel, starring Sean Connery (Twentieth Century Fox)

=== Television ===
Year	Title	Role	Notes
2019	Fried Rice Paradise	Chef Ting	Singapore TV series
2019	Babi!	Tan Sri Chu	Pilot of TV series for HOOQ.tv
2018	The Fifth Floor	Wong Meng Teck	Singapore TV series
2017	B R A	Senior Doctor	Singapore TV series
2017	My Mother's Story	Father-in-law	Singapore TV miniseries
2016	Fine Tune	Roger Wong	Singapore TV series
2015	Code of Law (Season 3)	Justice Peter Loh	Singapore TV series
2015	The Circle House	Tan Hock Chuan	Singapore TV-movie
2014	Mata Mata (Season 2)	Tan Eng Chye	Singapore TV series
2013	Code of Law (Season 2)	Justice Peter Loh	Singapore TV series
2012	Code of Law (Season 1)	Justice Peter Loh	Singapore TV series
2011	The Pupil (Season 2)	Justice Peter Loh	Singapore TV series
2009	10 (Sepuluh)	Liew	8-episode TV drama series
2009	Mr Siao's Mandarin Class	Robert Toh	TV sitcom
2008	Sense of Home: Kampung Kid	Marcus Owyang	Lead role in Singapore TV-movie, shot in Siem Reap, Cambodia
2008	Secrets of the Forbidden City	Xia Yuanji	Role of Minister of Revenue to Emperor Yongle, in the dramatised documentary for the BBC and the History Channel
2008	Bilik No. 13	Ah Keong	Lead role in one episode of Malay miniseries
2007	Marco Polo: Discovery of the World	Chief Map Maker	Hallmark TV-movie
2007	Sadiq and Co	Judge	Guest role in Malay TV series
2007	Gol & Gincu (Season 2)	Mr Wee	Guest role in TV series
2006	Realiti	David Yeoh	TV series
2006	Impian Ilyana	Ilyana's boss	Guest role in Malay TV series
2004	Singapore Shakes!	David Setoh	'Seventh Month' episode of the Singapore series
2004	Perceptions	Victor Wong	Main-cast member in the 13-episode Singapore series
2003	Each Other	Ronnie Ng	Semi-regular role in the 13-episode drama series
2002	Kopitiam	Kok Hui	Guest role in one episode of the 3rd season
2002	Love Matters: The Marriage Factor	Daddy	Singapore telemovie
2001	Phua Chu Kang Pte Ltd	Lim Pek Kong	Guest role in one episode of the Singapore sitcom
2000	Teh Tarik Dot Com	Vince	Main cast member of the 13-episode sitcom
1999	Kopitiam	Major Lim	Guest role in one episode of sitcom (2nd season)
1996–1997	City of the Rich	Han Lee	Main cast member in the 200-episode series
1984	Maria	Peter	Malay TV-movie
1977	Bailey's Bird	Ming Ho	Guest role in German-Australian TV series

== Plays ==
=== Writing and Directing for Theatre ===
Year	Title	Role	Notes
2025	1984 Here and Now	Writer	University of Nottingham Literary and Dramatic Society
2022	The Swordfish, Then the Concubine	Writer	Revival staging of Mandarin version, directed by Loh Kok Man
2018	The Big Purge	Writer	Translated into Greek and staged by Aggelon Vima, a theatre in Athens. Directed by Margarita Dalamaga Kalogirou
2017	Swordfish + Concubine	Producer, writer-cum-director	Kuala Lumpur Performing Arts Centre (KLPac)
2016	The Swordfish, Then the Concubine	Writer	Translated into Mandarin, directed by Loh Kok Man
2016	1984 Here and Now	Writer	Translated into Mandarin, directed by Loh Kok Man
2011	Swordfish + Concubine: The Fall of Singapura	Writer	Directed by Jonathan Lim, Young 'n' Wild, Singapore
2008	The Swordfish, Then the Concubine	Writer	Directed by Ivan Heng, premiered as the opening play of the Singapore Theatre Festival 2008, organised by Wild Rice Productions.
2006	The Swordfish, Then the Concubine	Writer	The play made it to the Top 5 out of over 600 entries to the International Playwriting Festival, organised by the Warehouse Theatre in Croydon, United Kingdom, with excerpts presented at the festival in November 2006
2005	The Big Purge	Writer	Selected for Typhoon 4, a playreading festival organised by the Yellow Earth Theatre and presented in Soho Theatre, London
1995	We Could **** You Mr. Birch	Writer-cum-director	The play was invited to the Festival of Asian Performing Arts in Singapore (performances on 5 and 6 June at the World Trade Centre Auditorium).
1994	We Could **** You Mr. Birch	Writer-cum-director	Performed for two seasons in June and December.
1993	The Birch and the Rod	Director	A play written by K.S. Maniam, which premiered at the Australasian Drama Studies Association Conference in Perth, Western Australia
1992	Macbeth	Director	A Shakespearean play
1990	Madame Mao's Memories	Director	A play written by Henry Ong
1988	The Big Purge	Writer-cum-director	Staged at Essex University Theatre, UK
1984	1984 Here and Now	Writer	Staged in 1985 by Five Arts Centre, directed by Krishen Jit
1981	Narukami	Director	Adapted from the Kabuki theatre
1977	Eyeballs, Leper, and a Very Dead Spider	Writer-cum-director	
1977	The Battles of Coxinga	Director	A play adapted from the Bunraku theatre
1976	Narukami	Director	Adapted from the Kabuki theatre
1975	Rhinoceros	Director	A play written by Eugene Ionesco
1974	The Situation of the Man who Stabbed a Dummy or a Woman and was Disarmed by the Members of the Club for a Reason Yet Obscure, If There Was One	Writer-cum-director	
1973	An Old Man Died Today	Writer-cum-director	

=== Acting in Theatre ===
Year	Title	Role	Notes
2015	Public Enemy	Actor (as Martin Kwek)	Play written by Henrik Ibsen, directed by Glen Goei, and staged at W!ld Rice Productions at Victoria Theatre, Singapore
2014	2 Houses	Actor (as Heah)	Directed by Lim Yubeng, premiered/commissioned at George Town Festival
2012	The Flight of the Jade Bird	Actor (as The Narrator)	Directed by Mark Chan, premiered and opening show for the Singapore Arts Festival 2012, staged at Esplanade Concert Hall
2011	The Baling Talks	Actor (as Chin Peng)	Played at the Singapore Arts Festival 2011 for Five Arts Centre
2008	The Baling Talks	Actor (as Tunku Abdul Rahman)	Played for Five Arts Centre at the Annexe Gallery, Kuala Lumpur
2002	Beautifully Read	Actor (as one of the readers)	A performance sponsored by the US Embassy, directed by Karin delaPena, artistic director of Speaking of Stories, based in Santa Barbara, California
1999	Expat Comes to Town	Actor (as multiple roles)	A cross-cultural comedy, performed in Kuala Lumpur, Ipoh, and Penang
1998	A dinner-theatre murder mystery	Actor (as Datuk)	Played at the KL Ritz-Carlton Hotel
1997	Honour	Actor (as Gus)	Play written by Joanna Murray-Smith
1991	A Man for All Seasons	Actor (as Cromwell)	Play written by Robert Bolt
1990	Gulls	Lead actor (as Bill)	Written and directed by Robert Hewett
1990	The Proposal	Actor (as Chubukhov)	Play written by Anton Chekhov
1989	Death of a Salesman	Actor (as Willy Loman)	Play written by American playwright Arthur Miller
1988	The Big Purge	Actor (as Father)	Also wrote and directed
1987	Anak Tanjung	Actor (as Ah Heng)	A Malay play written by Noordin Hassan
1986	The Cord	Actor (as Muthiah)	Played at The Drama Festival, Singapore
1986	The Coffin Is Too Big for the Hole	Actor (one-man performance)	Play written by Kuo Pao Kun
1985	1984 Here and Now	Actor (as various roles)	Also wrote. Staged in 1985 by Five Arts Centre, directed by Krishen Jit
1985	Yap Ah Loy - The Play	Actor (various roles)	Play written by Chin San Sooi
1984	Long Day's Journey Into Night	Actor (as Jamie Tyrone)	Play written by Eugene O'Neill
1984	The Cord	Actor (as Muthiah)	Play written by K.S. Maniam
1981	Rosencrantz and Guildenstern Are Dead	Actor (as Claudius)	Play written by Tom Stoppard
1981	Narukami	Actor (as Danjo)	Also directed the play
1977	Antigone	Actor (as Creon)	Play written by Jean Anouilh

== Scriptwriting for television ==
- 2009: Writing storylines for Auntie English, produced by Astro
- 2004: Co-writing the script for one episode of Singapore Shakes! with Remesh Panicker, followed by another episode, singly
- 1998–1999: Writing storylines for the 150-episode Idaman II
- 1997–1998: Writing storylines for the 150-episode Idaman

== Published books ==
- Lim Kit Siang: Malaysian First, Volume Two: Bold to The Last Battle (Strategic Information and Research Development Centre, 2023)
- Lim Kit Siang: Malaysian First, Volume One: None But the Bold (Landmark Books, 2021)
- The People's Victory (Marshall Cavendish, 2019)
- Swordfish + Concubine, play-text (Gerakbudaya, 2018)
- You Want This GOONvernment Ah? (Gerakbudaya, 2018)
- Unbelievably Stupid Too! (Gerakbudaya, 2015)
- Unbelievably Stupid! (Gerakbudaya, 2015)
- Can We Save Malaysia, Please! (Marshall Cavendish, 2014)
- We Could **** You, Mr Birch, 20th anniversary republication (Gerakbudaya, 2014)
- The Elections Bullshit (Strategic Information and Research Development Centre, 2013)
- Ask for No Bullshit, Get Some More! (Strategic Information and Research Development Centre, 2013)
- No More Bullshit, Please, We're All Malaysians (Marshall Cavendish, 2012)
- March 8: Time for Real Change (Marshall Cavendish, 2010)
- March 8: The Day Malaysia Woke Up (Marshall Cavendish, 2008)
- 1984 Here and Now, play-text and introduction by Helen Gilbert (Marshall Cavendish, 2004)
- The Big Purge, play-text and introduction by Shirley Geok-lin Lim (Marshall Cavendish, 2004)
- We Could **** You, Mr Birch, play-text and introduction by Robert Yeo (Marshall Cavendish, 2004)
- We Could **** You, Mr Birch, play-text and introduction by Robert Yeo (self-published, 1995; reprinted, 1995, 1996, 1998, and 2000)
- We Could **** You, Mr Birch, play-text and theatre programme (self-published, 1994)
- Just In So Many Words, collection of selected writings in the press (Heinemann, 1992; reprinted, 1993)
- Haunting the Tiger and Other Stories, edited (Berita Publishing, 1991)
- Old Doctors Never Fade Away, a biography (Teks Publishing, 1988)
- 1984 Here and Now, play text and post-performance reviews (K. Das Ink, 1987)

== Other publications ==
- Extract from play We Could **** You, Mr Birch included in An Anthology of English Writing from Southeast Asia edited by Rajeev S. Patke, Isabella Banzon, Philip Holden and Lily Rose Tope (National Library Board, Singapore, 2012)
- 'The Boy who Saved Singapura' in the anthology Malaysian Tales Retold and Remixed (ZI Publications, 2011)
- 'Just Another Empty Slogan?', an essay in the book No Honeymoon: Najib's First 100 Days (Gerakbudaya Enterprise, 2009)
- Ideals and Principles, a 10-minute play, in 10 X 10: 100 Minutes to Change the World (Kakiseni, 2008)
- 'Towards the Impossible Dream', an essay in the book Tipping Points (The Edge, 2008)
- Poems, extract from A Sense of Home, and play script of We Could *** You, Mr Birch included in anthology Petals of Hibiscus edited by Mohammad Quayum (Pearson Books, 2003)
- Another extract from A Sense of Home included in the anthology The Merlion and the Hibiscus (Penguin, 2002)
- Extract from screenplay A Long Way from Hollywood included in Silverfish New Writing 2 edited by Satendra Nandan (Silverfishbooks, 2002)
- 1984 Here and Now included in Postcolonial Plays - An Anthology edited by Helen Gilbert (Routledge, UK, 2001)
- Extract from a novel in progress entitled A Sense of Home included in the anthology New Writing 10, edited by Penelope Lively and George Szirtes (Picador, UK, 2001)
- Poems included in bilingual anthology of Malaysian poetry Suara Rasa (Maybank, 1993)
- Several poems included in bilingual Anthology of Malaysian Poetry/Antologi Puisi Pelbagai Kaum edited by K.S. Maniam and M.Shanmughalingam (Dewan Bahasa dan Pustaka, 1988)
- Numerous poems published in Malaysian newspapers and journals Masakini and Southeast Asian Review of English, and in magazines and journals abroad - Asiaweek (Hong Kong), Focus, Sands and Coral, Solidarity, Ideya (Philippines), Pacific Quarterly Moana (New Zealand), Ariel (Canada), Kunapipi (Australia).
- Numerous radio plays broadcast over Radio Malaysia.
