= Ida Nerina =

Malaysian actress

- ايدا نيرينا
- Born: Ida Nerina binti Hussain; 13 January 1964 (age 62); Middlesex, England
- Occupations: Actress, producer, director, host
- Years active: 1986–present
- Spouse: Sha'arin Razali (2006–2009)
- Parent: Marina Yusoff (mother)

Ida Nerina Hussain (born 13 January 1964) better known by her stage name Ida Nerina is a Malaysian actress, producer and director.

== Biography ==
Ida Nerina's career in TV and films began in the early 1990s. In 1992, she was nominated for Best Actress in a Supporting Role at the 10th Malaysian Film Festival for her portrayal of E.J. in Shuhaimi Baba's Selubung, her first ever performance in feature film. Ida Nerina has since been nominated and awarded several times, including the Best Actress award at the 13th Malaysian Film Festival for her portrayal of Ena Manja Lara in Shuhaimi Baba's 1997 film Layar Lara, which also won awards at the Brussels Independent Film Festival in 1997.

Ida Nerina's other Malay film roles include Mimpi Moon, Pontianak Harum Sundal Malam, Sepet, Gubra, and most recently 1957: Hati Malaya, a Shuhaimi Baba film depicting the struggle of the Malaysian founding fathers to free the country from British colonial rule, in which Ida Nerina plays Datin Halimah, wife of Dato Onn Jaafar.

In 2008, Nerina and friend Tania Khan were selected to race in the reality TV Show The Amazing Race Asia, season 3, where they finished third in Phuket, Thailand.

Throughout her career Ida Nerina has collaborated with people such as Aziz M. Osman, Yasmin Ahmad, Datuk Yusof Haslam, Shuhaimi Baba, and Datuk Lat. On 21 June 2009, Ida Nerina fractured her spine in a fall at a condominium in Persiaran Syed Putra. The incident prompted Ida Nerina to move into directing.

== Awards and nominations ==
- 1992 Anugerah Skrin TV3 Best Actress- Anak Angkat
- 1998 Malaysian Film Festival Best Actress – Layar Lara
- 2000 Malaysian Film Festival Best Supporting Actress – Mimpi Moon
- 2005 Malaysian Film Festival Best Supporting Actress – Sepet
- 2006 Malaysian Film Workers Association (PPFM) Oscars Best Actress – Langit Maghrib
- 2009 Anugerah Skrin Best Supporting Actress Susuk

== Filmography ==
=== Film ===
| Year | Title | Role | Notes |
|---|---|---|---|
| 1992 | Selubung | E.J | Debut film appearances |
| 1995 | XX Ray II | Seri Bayu | |
| 1995 | Pesona Cinta | Juwita | |
| 1997 | Layar Lara | Ena Manjalara | |
| 2000 | Mimpi Moon | Miranda Cordoba | |
| 2001 | Sara | Sara | |
| 2002 | Gerak Khas The Movie II | Carina | |
| 2004 | Pontianak Harum Sundal Malam | Sitam | |
| 2004 | Sepet | Mak Inom | |
| 2005 | Pontianak Harum Sundal Malam 2 | Bayang | |
| 2005 | Baik Punya Cilok | Sergeant Wan Nor Azlin | |
| 2006 | Gubra | Mak Inom | |
| 2007 | 1957: Hati Malaya | Datin Halimah Hussein | |
| 2007 | Waris Jari Hantu | National Registration Officer | Cameo appearance |
| 2008 | Wayang | Mak Cik Esah | |
| 2008 | Los dan Faun | Serina Mysterina | |
| 2008 | Susuk | Suzana | |
| 2008 | Anak | Kay | |
| 2009 | Talentime | Datin Kalsom | |
| 2013 | Tanda Putera | Jah Steno | |
| 2018 | The Outsider | Store Manager | |
| 2022 | Spilt Gravy on Rice | Salamiah | |

=== TV movies ===
- 1988 — Nuriana (directed by Syed Alwi). Ida played the role of a ghost in present-day Kuala Lumpur.
- 1991 — Terang-Terang (directed by Shuhaimi Baba)
- 1992 — Anak Angkat (directed by Aziz M. Osman)
- 1993 — Duda (directed by Nasir Jani). Role: Rough-cut single-parent factory worker.
- 1993 — Antara Bulan dan Sutera (directed by Kamal Rozza). Role: Mentally disturbed writer accused of murdering her husband.
- 1993 — Ratu Jamu (directed by Erma Fatima)
- 1993 — Cemas (directed by Hadzrin Husni). Role: Company executive who gets caught up with smugglers.
- 1993 — Tunggu Sekejap (directed by Aziz M. Osman). Role: Divorcee and mother of a child.
- 1994 — Sekali Peristiwa (directed by M. Osman). Role: A gold-digging young wife.
- 1994 — Aku Anak Siapa (directed by Erma Fatima). Ida was nominated and short-listed for Best Actress at TV3's awards in 1995 for her portrayal of Mastura, a prostitute with an illegitimate child and an abusive pimp.
- 1994 — Cinta Selluloid (directed by Aziz M. Osman). Role: Successful film star who falls in love with her leading man.
- 1994 — Pinggiran (directed by Ismail Yaakob). Role: A partially deaf girl who falls in love with a blind man.
- 1995 — Amer & Amera (directed by Rashid Sibir).
- 1995 — Permit (directed by Erma Fatima). Role: A woman who falls in love with an illegal immigrant.
- 1995 — Oh Mama (directed by M. Rajoli)
- 1995 — Tarian Hidup (directed by S. Amin Shahab)
- 1996 — Ladang (directed by Aida Fitri Buyong). Role: A Bohemian artist who gets tangled up in her best friend's family feud.
- 1996 — Mengejar Zuriah (directed by Aida Fitri Buyong). Role: 30-something mother-of-two and primary school teacher.
- 2004 — Beras Kunyit Dipagi Raya (directed by Jinggo). Ida's return to TV, co-starring with Rosyam Noor. A love story about a couple, estranged from their mothers to remain together.
- 2005 — Langit Maghrib (directed by Raja Ahmad Alauddin). Role: A woman who loses her whole family on the eve of Adilfitri and is haunted by their ghosts. Produced by Grand Brilliance for TV3. Ida won her 5th award for the role: Best Actress at PPFM's Oscars.
- 2005 — Chah (directed by Rashid Sibir). Role: The title role of a village girl who has a series of horrifying misfortunes in her life which cause her to go mad.
- 2007 — Hujan Malam (directed by Rashid Sibir). Opera Klasik telemovie.
- 2007 — Sandaran Kasih (directed by Adam Hamid). Role: A woman dying of bone cancer who has to come to terms and make peace with her father and leave her son. Grand Brilliance telemovie for Raya Haji.
- 2007 — Residen (directed by Ismail Yaakob). Role: One of five film crew members who get caught up in a haunted house they are visiting. Grand Brilliance Telemovie for NTV7.

=== TV programmes ===
- 1986 — Muzik Muzik
- 2002 — Talk About Love – This English sitcom is a collaboration with co-star Zahim Albakri and writers Yasmin Yaacob, Na'a Murad and Mira Mustaffa. The plot revolves around the lives and loves of TV professionals centred within a TV station which produces a weekly magazine show, Talk About Town. Ida plays Helena Hamid.
- 2002 — Fatimah Psikik – Ida plays the title role of Fatimah in this mini-series of five 45-minute episodes. The story revolves around Fatimah, who survives after being struck by lightning. Fatimah is diagnosed with amnesia but discovers the world of psychic phenomena. Co-directed by Shuhaimi Baba and Ibrahim Elyas
- 2003 — Talk About Love – Recorded a second season after a successful screening of its first season early on the year. The series was also highly commended at the final Asian Television Awards held in Singapore at the end of 2006.
- 2004 — 1,2,3 Baby! – Ida's directorial debut in television, a new parental programme from the producers of 3R, Red Communications.
- 2004 — Astana Idaman 2 – Astro Ria's signature soap opera. Ida's character, Ersla, is a semi-regular on the show.
- 2005 — Aku Lelaki – An English sitcom.
- 2006 — Agen 016 – Comedy series in which Ida was a semi-regular scientist.
- 2006 — Mitosastras – A mini-series for TV3's Samarinda slot.
- 2008 — The Amazing Race Asia 3 – The Asian version of The Amazing Race reality TV show, in which Ida Nerina and her friend Tania finished third in the race.
- 2009 — Akademi Fantasia – Ida becomes the acting and drama coach for the seventh season of the show.
- 2011 — WOMEN 100 – Ida directed eight short plays about women, LIPSTICK & elbowGREASE, for the 100th International Women's Day.
