= Rusdi Ramli =

Malaysian actor and director

- رشدي راملي
- Born: Rusdi bin Ramli; 16 June 1970 (age 55); Ulu Kelang, Selangor, Malaysia
- Occupations: Actor, host, director
- Years active: 1989–present
- Spouse: Sharon Anne Paul Abdullah (m. 2008; div. 2024)
- Children: 3

Rusdi Ramli (Jawi: رشدي راملي; born 16 June 1970) is a Malaysian actor and director who won the 20th Malaysia Film Festival for Best Actor at the University of Science Malaysia. He is a son of the veteran Malaysian actress, Norlia Ghani. Rusdi is born in Ulu Kelang and has starred in many Malaysian television and movie dramas. He was named after P. Ramlee's 1970 film, Dr. Rushdi. His father was Ramli Ismail, popularly known as Ramli Kechik.

== Filmography ==
=== Film ===
Year	Title	Role	Notes
1989	Sumpahan Mahsuri		
1989	Tuah	Hang Lekiu	
1991	Memory	Helmi	
2000	Leftenan Adnan	Private Malik	
2005	Pontianak Harum Sundal Malam II	Zali/Joyo	
2006	Bilut	Hassan	
2007	Qabil Khushry Qabil Igam	Qabil Igam	
2007	Waris Jari Hantu	Ari	
2007	1957: Hati Malaya	Hali/Azahari	
2008	Cuci	Salesman	
2008	Anak	Isaac	
2013	Awan Dania The Movie	Remy	
2013	Mencari Cinta	Razlan	
2013	Tanda Putera	Tun Abdul Razak	
2014	Faithful	Mohamed	Short film
2018	Polis Evo 2	Commander Maarof	
2022	Seratus		Cameo appearance
2024	Rampok		

=== Television series ===
Year	Title	Role	TV channel	Notes
1989	Opah		TV1	
1992	Drama Pendekar - Pedang Maut		TV1	
1992	Drama Pendekar - Pertarungan Maut		TV1	
1993	Drama Pendekar - Pahlawan Lima		TV1	
1994	Hati Waja		TV1	
1996	Cinta Korporat	Badrul	TV3	
1997	Kiambang Bertaut		TV3	
1998–2002	Mat Despatch	Aidil	TV1	
2006	Kamasutra	Amir	TV3	
2007	Dendam Terlerai	Kamil	TV9	
2008	Chef Masin Pahit 4 Rasa	Malik	TV1	
2008	Ai D'Beijing	Jeffrey	TV3	
2008	Kasih Iftitah	Azrai	TV3	
2009–2011	Waris	Ari	TV2	2 Season's
2010	Sos Cili Sos Tilam	Irwan	TV1	
2010	Ahmad Durrah	Ahmad Durrah	TV3	
2010	Arjuna	Panglima Kebal	TV3	
2011	Dia Bukan Maryam	Kamal	TV9	
2011	Moreh		Astro Oasis	
2012	Lara Hati	Hadeef	TV9	
2014	Tanah Kubur (Season 11)	Kassim	Astro Oasis	Episode: "Kubur Terbakar"
2014	Tentang Hati	Umar	TV2	
2015	Kifarah Mistik		TV3	Episode: "Gantung"
2015	Aku Bukan Dia	Johari	TV1	
2016	Hero	Tuan Ariffin	TV2	
2016	Suami Tanpa Cinta	Syafiq/Apek	Astro Ria	
2016	Akadku Yang Terakhir	Tuan Alaudin	Astro Prima	
2017	Sumpah Ibu	—	TV9	Also as director
2017	Mr. Stalker... Saya Cintakan Awaklah!	Jeffri	Hypp Sensasi	Also as director
2017	Setia Menunggumu	—	Salam HD	Also as director
2018	Cinta Fatamorgana	Tuan Munir	TV3	
2018	Doa Ku Mohon	—	TV3	As director
2018	Cinta Tiada Ganti	Nizman @ Atan	Astro Prima	
2018	Cintaku Di Bumi Izmir	Syed Kamaruddin Syed Mansur	Hypp Sensasi	
2019	Setelah Cinta Itu Pergi	Encik Razak	TV3	
2021	Kampung Kolesterol	Suratman	TV9	
2021	Black (Season 2)	Pak Hassan	Viu	
2021	Ali Alia	Amir	Astro Prima	
2022	Republik Gombak	—	TV3	As director
2023	Bawah Blok	Hassan	TV3	
2023	Misteri Flat Kirana	—	TV3	As director

=== Telemovie ===
Year	Title	Role	TV channel	Notes
1998	Dajal Suci	Amran	TV3	
2002	Anak Bapak		TV3	
2002	Mertua Oh Mertua		TV3	
2002	Cinta Yana & Addin			
2003	Momok 3	Danial	VCD	
2003	Menantu Tanjung			
2003	Keranamu Durian		TV3	
2004	Baju Punya Pasal			
2004	Mario Mariono Bros			
2007	Abang! Mak Panggil Balik!	Harun	TV9	
2009	Pesan Mak		TV2	
2009	Andaiku Tahu	Fuad	TV2	
2010	Kasut Emas	Ramli	TV2	
2011	Jiman	Jiman	TV9	
2013	Jangan Ganggu Aku	Razif	TV3	
2013	Karlos Bolos	ASB Zain	TV3	
2015	Manikam Hati	Farihin	TV9	
2016	Kecoh-Kecoh Raya		TV2	
2018	Misteri Maria	—	NTV7	As director
2018	Fasiq	—	NTV7	As director
2018	Kekasih di Kala Maghrib	—	TV1	As director
2018	Taubatku		TV3	Special appearance
2019	Batin Zakiah	Azmi	TV3	
2022	Atuk On Tak On	—	TV Okey	As director
2022	Setia		TV2	

=== Television ===
Year	Title	Role	TV channel	Notes
2009	Anak Wayang	Host	Astro Ria	with Fazura

== Discography ==
=== Album ===
- Rusdi Ramli - The Essential (2011)
