= Betty Banafe =

- بيتي بنافى
- Born: Betty Ibtisam binti Abu Bakar Banafe; 14 November 1979 (age 46); Johor Bahru, Johor, Malaysia
- Years active: 1999–present
- Spouse: Bruce Dargus (2012–2019)
- Children: 2
- Musical career
- Genres: Nasheed
- Occupations: Singer, actor, entrepreneur
- Website: www.bettybanafe.com

Betty Banafe (born Betty Ibtisam binti Abu Bakar Banafee; 14 November 1979), is a Malaysian singer and actor from Johor Bahru, Johor.

Banafe's family is of Malay, Arab Yemeni, Javanese, Spanish and Dutch descent. She became an actor despite opposition from her father and attended Universiti Teknologi Mara, where she earned a bachelor's degree in Mass Communications - Public Relations (with honors), despite almost being expelled from University for being 'too active' in the film industry during her years of study.

== Personal life ==
Betty Banafe married Anglo-American businessman and technology consultant, Bruce Dargus on 12 December 2012. She was divorced by her husband on 4 July 2019, by the utterance of one Talaq before two male Malaysian Muslim witnesses at Sultan Salahuddin Abdul Aziz Mosque in Shah Alam, and again on 5 July 2019, before two male Malaysian Muslim witnesses in Ampang, by the utterance of a second Talaq.

== Music career ==
Betty Banafe is one of few Malaysian artists that is known for singing in Arabic. Since her full-length album 'Ibtisam' was released, Betty has been making guest appearances at private events.

== Filmography ==
=== Film ===
Year	Title	Role	Notes
2004	Buai Laju-laju	Zaiton	
2007	Haru-biru	Suzi	
2007	1957 Hati Malaya	Normala Friends	
2017	Hijabsta Ballet	Diana	
2017	I'm Not A Terrorist	—	

=== Television series ===
Year	Title	Role	TV channel	Notes
1999	Nur Penyuluh Alam	—	NTV7	In 24 episode
2000	Shahsudin, Siva & Partner	—	TV1	Sitcom in 13 episode
2001	Fakulti	—	TV1	
2001–2002	Kiranya Aku Tahu	—	TV3	In 26 episode
2001–2002	Dari Maisarah Untuk Qistina	—	TV1	
2002	Nenek Sidah Dr. Syakilla	—	TV1	In 6 episode
2003	Hijab & Kabur	—	TV1	In 15 episode
2005	Simbiosis	—	TV3	In 24 episode
2006	Bila Rama-Rama Terkopak Sayapnya	Ani	TV1	In 26 episode
2007–2008	Spa Q (Season 1)	Nora	TV3	

=== Telemovie ===
Year	Title	Role	TV channel	Notes
2000	Cikgu Siti	Cikgu Siti	TV1	
2001	Cats	—	—	India telemovie
2002	I'm Muslim	—	TV2	
2002	Lady Anne	—	TV3	
2003	Sayangnya Liya	—	—	Direct-to-video
2003	Hijrahku	Adlina	TV3	
2003	Kepulangan	—	—	
2003	Talkin Syahadah	—	TV3	
2004	Aleya Maisarah	Aleya Maisarah	TV3	
2005	Sifu	—	TV2	
2005	Yang Tulus	—	TV1	
2006	Tak Pulang Nak Pulang	—	TV1	
