= Shah Rezza =

Malaysian actor and singer (born 1961)

Yang Berhormat Mulia Tengku Sri Kelana D’Raja Dato' Sri Raja Rezza Shah Raja Aman Shah SSAP SJMK DSAP DIMP SK
- Born: Raja Shah Zurin bin Raja Aman Shah; 26 January 1961 (age 65); Perak, Federation of Malaya (now Malaysia)
- Occupation: Actor
- Years active: 1981–present
- Relatives: Sultan Muhammad V (cousin)
- Musical career
- Genre: Nasheed
- Instruments: Vocals

Raja Rezza Shah bin Raja Aman Shah (born Raja Shah Zurin bin Raja Aman Shah; 26 January 1961), better known as Shah Rezza is a Malaysian actor and member of Kelantan and Perak royal families. He rose to fame in his acting career in the 1980s, and is known for starring in the films Ali Setan (1985), Marah-Marah Sayang (1987) and Kolej 56 (1989).

His appearance in the field of acting, contemporaneous with Sabree Fadzil, Ridzuan Hashim, Mustapha Kamal, Liza Abdullah, Ogy Ahmad Daud and Raja Noor Baizura.

== Early life ==
Shah Rezza was born on 26 January 1961 and is the youngest brother of two siblings. He studied restoration and conservation of period property at London's world-renowned Inchbald School of Design.

== Career ==
Shah Rezza began his career as a model at the age of 14 in the 1970s.

He then continued his career in the entertainment industry in 1981 in the film Mangsa. Only in 1985, he became famous through the film Ali Setan directed by Tan Sri Jins Shamsuddin. Then, he was cast with Dato' M. Nasir and Pyan Habib in the film Kembara Seniman Jalanan directed by Nasir Jani in 1986.

During the 1980s, Shah Rezza teamed up with other stars like Uji Rashid, Ahmad Fauzee, Faizal Hussein and others in RTM's entertainment shows Mekar Sejambak and Hiburan Minggu Ini.

In 1997, he turned music producer for the album titled Pedoman, which featured spiritual songs by fellow singer-actors Nassier Wahab, Ebby Saiful, Ahmad Fauzee and Syed Sobrie.

Shah Rezza developed his business acumen by forming his own company, Nusantara Gems, which planned the wedding of pop queen Dato' Sri Siti Nurhaliza and businessman Dato' Sri Khalid Mohamad Jiwa on 21 August 2006.

Since 2006, he has been organising the annual International Islamic Fashion Festival, a celebration of traditional and modern fashion, and its fusion with an Islamic theme.

Shah Rezza released a sequel album in 2013 titled Pedoman 2, which contained songs written and composed by Fauzi Marzuki, Habsah Hassan, Melly Goeslow, S. Atan and Akbar Nawab.

== Personal life ==
Shah Rezza comes from Perak Royal Family and was raised by the family of his stepmother, Dato' Hajah Tengku Salwani binti Almarhum Sultan Yahya Petra in Kelantan. He is a cousin of the Sultan of Kelantan Sultan Muhammad V.

His father, the Tengku Sri Kelana D'Raja Colonel (Rtd) Dato' Raja Aman Shah bin Raja Haji Shahar Shah died on 26 January 2018.

== Filmography ==
=== Film ===
List of acting performances by Shah Rezza in film
Year	Title	Role	Notes
1981	Mangsa		Debut film appearances
1985	Ali Setan	Jali	
1986	Kembara Seniman Jalanan	Fareez	
1986	Ali Setan 2	Jali	
1986	Balik Kampung	Halim	
1986	Jejaka Perasan	Agus	
1987	Marah-Marah Sayang	Rosdin	
1988	Antara Dua Hati	Joe	
1989	Kolej 56	Tengku Kamil	
1990	Hati Bukan Kristal	Zain	
2004	Pontianak Harum Sundal Malam	Pembesar Istana III	
2021	J2: J Retribusi	Majid	

=== Television series ===
Year	Title	Role	TV channel
2015	Memori Cinta Suraya	Hakim	Astro Prima
2015	Tuan Anas Mikael	Pak Hamid	Astro Ria
2016	Lara Aishah	Farouq	Astro Prima
2017	Dendam Aurora	Feroz	Astro Prima
2017	Mr. London Miss Langkawi	Encik Azman	Mediacorp Suria
2018	Cinta Tiada Ganti	Dato' Azizan	Astro Prima
2018	Alamatnya Cinta	Tuan Herman	Astro Ria
2019	Jodoh-Jodoh Annisa	Hatta	Astro Prima
2020	Dua Takdir Cinta	Yusof	Astro Prima
2021	Hati Yang Dikhianati	Doktor Aman/Akhmal Mansur	Astro Prima
2021	Ayat-Ayat Cinta	Pak Ali	TV2
2021	Suara Hati	Haji Johari	Astro Prima
2021	Shah Alam 40000	Datuk Sri Yahya	TV3
2022	Bila Hati Memilih Dia	Ayah Adra	TV3
2022	Bisik Bisik Gelora	Hamid	TV3
2022	Cinta Buat Dara	Harun	TV3
2022	Dia Yang Ku Jadikan Suami	Dato’ Adham	Astro Ria
2022	Terima Kasih Cinta	Tan Sri Rashid	TV3
2022	Kerana Cinta Itu Ada	Encik Nazri	TV3
2023	Bukan Cinta Sempurna	Tuan Budi	Astro Ria
2023	Luruhnya Bunga Cinta	Tan Sri Izzam	TV3
2024	Luruhnya Bunga Cinta 2	Tan Sri Izzam	TV3
TBA	Kau Takdirkan Bersama	Pak Leman	TV3

=== Telemovie ===
List of performances by Shah Rezza in telemovies
Year	Title	Role	TV channel
1988	Harimau Miau-Miau	Amran	TV1
2015	Cinta Qasidah	Engku Zunur	Astro Ria
2017	Siapa Dia Sebenarnya		TV3
2024	Kau Takdirkan Bersama Raya	Pak Leman	TV3

=== Television ===
List of appearances/performances by Shah Rezza in television
Year	Title	Role	TV channel
1987	Mekar Sejambak		TV1
1987	Hiburan Minggu Ini		TV1

=== Discography ===
Year	Album details
1997	Pedoman: Release date: 1997; Label: Ambang Klasik; Compact disc, Cassette tape
2013	Pedoman 2: Release date: 2013; Label: Nusantara Gems; Compact disc, Digital download

== Titles, styles and honours ==
In April 2022, Shah Rezza was conferred the title of Tengku Sri Kelana D’Raja by his cousin Sultan Muhammad V of Kelantan with the styles as Yang Berhormat Mulia Tengku Sri Kelana D'Raja Dato' Sri Raja Rezza Shah bin Raja Aman Shah.

- Pahang
  - Grand Knight of the Order of Sultan Ahmad Shah of Pahang (Darjah Kebesaran Sri Sultan Ahmad Shah Pahang) - Dato' Sri (24 October 2012)
  - Knight Companion of the Order of Sultan Ahmad Shah of Pahang (Darjah Kebesaran Sultan Ahmad Shah Pahang) - Dato' (2011)
  - Knight Companion of the Esteemed Order of the Crown of Pahang (Darjah Kebesaran Mahkota Pahang Yang Dihormati) - Dato' (2003)
- Kelantan
  - Tengku Sri Kelana D'Raja (2022)
  - Knight Grand Commander of the Order of the Life of the Crown of Kelantan (Darjah Kebesaran Seri Paduka Jiwa Mahkota Kelantan Yang Amat Mulia) - Dato' (4 March 2019)
  - Recipient of the Seri Kelantan Decoration (30 March 1988)
