= Joanna Bessey =

Malaysian actress and director

- Born: 25 October 1976 (age 49); West Sussex, England
- Occupation: Actress
- Years active: 1997–present

Joanna Bessey (born 1976) is an actress and director based in Malaysia. She is best known for her role as Marie Tan in the situation comedy Kopitiam, which ran for 7 seasons.

== Early life ==
Bessey was born in West Sussex to a British father and Malaysian mother of Malay descent with Minangkabau lineage. Her parents had met when her mother moved to London on a Mara scholarship. From the age of four, Bessey moved around between Kajang for a brief stint, Singapore for a few years, and then Petaling Jaya and Kuala Lumpur for four years. At age 11, Bessey returned to England, where she attended Greenfields School.

== Career ==
Bessey has appeared in over 200 episodes of television, 6 TV movies, 5 feature films, commercials with 2 major celebrity endorsements, voice-over work for commercials and animated series and numerous theatre productions, over the last 10 years. Other TV credits include La Dolce Amira, Bilik 13, All Mixed Up and Island FM. She has been in feature films such as Lips to Lips, Buli, 1957- Hati Malaya and Waris Jari Hantu.

Bessey appeared on BBC World News hosting the travel documentary "Exploring Malaysia". She is also an environmentalist.

In 2020, Bessey made her videogame debut by voice acting as Eve in No Straight Roads

== Personal life ==
She is married to German husband Aurel Wunderer. They have a son born in 2011.

== Accolades ==
She has had the following nomations: 'Best Actor in a Supporting Role' at the 'Boh' Cameronian Arts Awards 2007, "Best Director" for her directorial debut of Ibsen's 'An Enemy of the People", 'Best Actress in a Comedy Role' for the award-winning sitcom, "Kopitiam" at the Asian Television Awards (Singapore) and was highly commended. She was voted Best Female Artist in 2000 by a public online poll.
