= Azri Iskandar =

Malaysian actor (born 1968)

- أزري إسكندر
- Born: Azri Iskandar bin Zulkiffly; June 13, 1968 (age 57); Kuala Lumpur, Malaysia
- Occupation: Actor
- Years active: 1998–present
- Spouses: Roziana Salim (m. 1992; div. 1999) Ellie Suriati (m. 2003; div. 2022)
- Children: 5

Azri Iskandar (born 13 June 1968) is a Malaysian actor. He has worked in the Malaysian film industry since the 1990s.

== Filmography ==
=== Film ===
| Year | Title | Role | Notes |
|---|---|---|---|
| 1998 | Iman Alone | Razif | Debut film appearances |
| 1999 | Puteri Impian 2 | Tengku Farid | |
| 1999 | Perempuan Melayu Terakhir | Engku Leh | |
| 2002 | Gerak Khas The Movie II | Inspector Zamri | |
| 2004 | Pontianak Harum Sundal Malam | Marsani | |
| 2005 | Pontianak Harum Sundal Malam 2 | Marsani | Cameo appearance |
| 2007 | Syaitan | Doctor Helmi | |
| 2009 | Jangan Tegur | Ustaz Amin | |
| 2012 | Lagenda Budak Setan 2: Katerina | Iskandar | |
| 2013 | Penanggal | Syed Yusoff Al-Attas | |
| 2013 | Malam Penuh Bermisteri | Inspector Razlan | |
| 2017 | J Revolusi | DSP Malek | Special appearance |
| 2019 | KL Vampires | Mr. Jamal | |
| 2021 | Mat Bond Malaya | Dr. Edel | |
| 2022 | Seratus | | Cameo appearance |
| 2022 | Daddyku Gangster | Remy | Cameo appearance |
| 2023 | Eva ‘Take Me As I Am’ | Father's Eva | |
| 2023 | War on Terror: KL Anarchy | Datuk Razlan | Cameo appearance |
| 2024 | Sheriff | Hussein Osman | |

=== Television series ===
| Year | Title | Role | TV channel | Notes |
|---|---|---|---|---|
| 2005 | Meniti Bara | Amri | TV2 | |
| 2010 | Nur Hidayah | | TV1 | |
| 2015 | Tersuka Tanpa Sengaja | Dato' Alias | Astro Ria | |
| 2016 | Surah Buat Maisarah | Dato' Mustafa | TV3 | |
| 2016 | Seindah Takdir Cinta | Datuk Kamal | TV3 | |
| 2016–2017 | Sein Dan Luna | Dato' Kamal | TV3 | |
| 2017 | Jejak Karmila | Syed Zaidi | TV3 | |
| 2018 | Lafazkan Kalimah Cintamu | Tengku Hisham | Astro Ria | Cameo |
| 2018 | Halalkan Hati Yang Di Curi | Daud | TV3 | |
| 2018 | Kalis Kasih | Kudin | TV3 | |
| 2018 | Terbaik Dariku | Azman | TV3 | |
| 2019 | Pengantin Lelaki Untuk Cik Gadis | Dato' Kameel | Astro Ria | |
| 2021 | Rahimah Tanpa Rahim | Tuan Rosdi | TV3 | |
| 2021 | Sabarlah Duhai Hati | Hamidi | TV3 | |
| 2021 | Single Terlalu Lama | | TV3 | |
| 2022 | Kuasa | Tan Sri Aziz | Astro Citra | |
| 2022 | Ada Apa Dengan Saka | Tuan Hambali | TV9 | |
| 2025 | Santau Perempuan Terlarang | Pendeta | tonton | |

=== Telemovie ===
| Year | Title | Role | TV channel |
|---|---|---|---|
| 2004 | Seriau | | VCD |
| 2009 | Kaki | | TV1 |
| 2012 | Semadikan Aku | Dato' Azri | TV3 |
| 2012 | Begitulah Sayang | Daniel | TV3 |
| 2015 | Qiam | Iskandar | Astro Ria |
| 2015 | Noda Setitik Arak | Datuk Bakhtiar | Astro Ria |
| 2017 | Ramadan Terindah Nurani | Rahim | TV3 |
| 2017 | Terhentinya Doa | Razali | TV3 |
| 2018 | Simpang Sejenak | | TV3 |
| 2018 | Super Menantu | Jimmy Dahlan | NTV7 |
| 2020 | Tanah Kubur | Aziz | Astro Citra |
| 2020 | Mencari Muhammad | | TV1 |
| 2022 | Tanah Kubur: Fitnah Akhir Zaman | Ustaz Rahim | Astro Citra |
