= Tanda Putera =

- Directed by: Shuhaimi Baba
- Written by: Noraini Baba; Shuhaimi Baba; Haslina Samad
- Screenplay by: Shuhaimi Baba
- Story by: Noraini Baba; Shuhaimi Baba; Haslina Samad
- Based on: 1969 racial riots
- Produced by: Shuhaimi Baba; Kavita Sidhu; Ibrahim Elias; Kamarul Nizam Abdul Rahman
- Starring: Rusdi Ramli; Zizan Nin; Faezah Elai; Linda Hashim
- Cinematography: Filus Ghazali
- Edited by: H. W. Kuang
- Music by: Sharon Paul
- Production company: Pesona Pictures
- Release date: August 29, 2013 (Malaysia)
- Running time: 115 minutes
- Country: Malaysia
- Language: Malay
- Budget: MYR 4 million
- Box office: MYR 0.93 million

Tanda Putera (English: The Mark of a Prince) is a 2013 Malaysian Malay-language historical political drama film directed by Shuhaimi Baba. The film chronicles the relationship between Tun Abdul Razak, who was the second Malaysian Prime Minister, and his then deputy Tun Dr Ismail set around the time after the 1969 racial riots. The film was intended to be released in Malaysian cinemas on 13 September 2012 but the release was delayed until 29 August 2013 due to some controversy regarding the portrayal of the racial riots being the plot point of the film. It is Shuhaimi Baba's sequel film to 1957: Hati Malaya in 2007.

== Plot ==
The film is a fiction loosely based from the race riots of 1969, when the racial tension had reached its height. The film portrays the close friendship between the second Malaysian prime minister, Tun Abdul Razak and his deputy, Tun Dr Ismail. They were secretive about their health problems as they had the task of restoring the peace in their country following the events of 13 May 1969. Tun Razak was suffering from leukaemia and he had to keep it a secret from his family, so they both sought the services of Dr. Macpherson, who used his reading room as a secret clinic for his treatment.

== Cast ==
- Rusdi Ramli as Abdul Razak Hussein, Deputy Prime Minister (later Prime Minister 2nd) and husband Rahah
- Zizan Nin as Ismail Abdul Rahman, Minister of Home Affairs later Deputy Prime Minister to Razak
- Faezah Elai as Rahah Mohammad Noah, Abdul Razak's wife
- Linda Hashim as Norashikin Mohd Seth, Ismail's wife
- Kamarulzaman Taib as Tunku Abdul Rahman, First Prime Minister and mentor Abdul Razak, Ismail
- Nazril Idrus as Mahathir Mohamad, a doctor and Member Parliament Kubang Pasu
- Norman Hakim as Inspector-General Mohammed Hanif bin Omar, Inspector of General Police 4th
- Sakhee Shamsuddin as Najib Razak, Abdul Razak's son
- Bell Ngasri as Dato' Harun Idris, Menteri Besar Selangor
- Amar Baharin as Tengku Razaleigh Hamzah, Founder Petronas
- Riz Amin as Ibrahim Ismail, high ranking officer Malaysian Armed Forces
- Azliyuszaini Mohd Noor as Mohamed Salleh Ismael, Inspector of General Police 2nd
- Kavita Sidhu as Kara
- Riezman Khuzaimi as Sergeant Aman
- Kuza as Maimon
- Zaefrul Nordin as Corporal Musa
- Ika Nabila as Zarah
- Zoey Rahman as Johan
- Shiqin Kamal as Zailah Ismail
- Ahya U as Zaman
- Alan Yun as Allen
- Starley Wong as Father's Allen
- Douglas Lim as Leslie Cheah
- Ida Nerina as Jah Steno
- Sharifah Shahirah as Headmaster
- Chew Kin Wah as Tan Chong Chor
- Fizz Fairuz as Arshad Ayub

== Historical accuracy ==
Shuhaimi Baba had stated that the film is based on true historical facts and that it is not a propaganda and that the film is mainly about the friendship between Tun Razak and Tun Dr Ismail, while the 13 May incident is merely a backdrop to the film. However, Shuhaimi also mentioned that there were significant amounts of creative illustration and fictional content added in.

== Reception ==
=== Critical response ===
Aidil Rusli writing for The Star calls the film "an engaging experience" despite its "niggling faults" - its approach to an episodic narrative "having to cram everything into a two-hour movie", and "less-than-believable" CGI shots to illustrate the period the film was set in.

Umapagan Ampikaipakan, of radio station BFM 89.9, on the review website UmaandJoe.com says that the film glorified Abdul Razak and Dr Ismail at the expense of their predecessor Tunku Abdul Rahman; that it had "made Tunku look like a blithering fool. It made him look toothless. [...] when you tell the story, you don’t undermine another leader. You don’t say Bill Clinton was great but JFK was a loser.” His co-host Johanan Sen observed on the production aspect of the film where its first half "looks like an unfinished History Channel special without voiceovers done or without any proper historians being interviewed. [...] ...a re-enactment footage arranged together without proper narrative."

Erna Mahyuni of Malay Mail, in a scathing commentary of the film that was widely circulated online, also stated of its seemingly lacking of a coherent narrative; with the ensemble cast's performance having "the collective expressiveness of IKEA furniture". The performance of lead actor Rusdi Ramli in particular was derided for his "unconvincing" expressions and "forced" chemistry with co-actor Zizan Nin, the latter aspect coming across as "a parody of bromance". Erni further wrote that the movie appeared to have negationist undertones against the 1969 riots and it negatively portrayed the two statesmen protagonists "as pompous idiots who do not trust their wives".

There was also some common ground regarding how the central characters of Abdul Razak and Ismail, and their wives had been miscast by more younger actors.

=== Box-office ===
The movie failed to collect back its budget, affected by the Penang screening ban and intense competition with other international movies that were also showing in cinemas at the time such as Kick-Ass 2 and The Mortal Instruments: City of Bones. In addition, another local movie that was released at about the same time titled KL Zombi surpassed it and the aforementioned international films to hit second place in opening weekend takings between 29 August and 4 September alone, with only Elysium beating it at first place.

== Controversies and issues ==
=== Penang ban, viewing advisory and screening ===
Before the release of the film, it sparked controversies about the accuracy of its contents after the release of the trailer in relation to the 13 May riots. Opposition lawmakers alleged that the film portrayed the Chinese and the Democratic Action Party (DAP) in a negative light. Further controversy was caused after there were allegations that the film's official Facebook page featured a picture of opposition lawmaker Lim Kit Siang being carried away by a group of uniformed officials with captions claiming that Lim had urinated on the Selangor flag in the house of former Selangor chief minister Harun Idris. Lim denied the allegation in response and said that the picture featuring him in the Facebook page was actually taken in Sabah in 1984. The director Shuhaimi Baba also denied that Lim was to be featured in the film.

On 28 August 2013, the Penang state government had sent out advisory directives to all cinema operators in the state to not screen the movie. Chief Minister Lim Guan Eng had claimed that there are slanderous scenes that could provoke racial hatred. However, less than 24 hours after the directives were issued on 29 August, the state government issued another contradictory letter stating they were merely "advised" against screening it, instead of otherwise banning it. Cinemas in Penang eventually screened the movie despite the state government's advisory. Communications and Multimedia Minister Ahmad Shabery Cheek said the movie would reach cinemas in Penang starting 31 August 2013.
