= Haq (2010 film) =

- Malaysian poster
- Directed by: CL Hor; Jumaatun Azmi
- Screenplay by: Kasehdia Scriptworks
- Story by: Kasehdia Scriptworks
- Produced by: Nanu Baharudin; Jumaatun Azmi
- Starring: Zul Huzaimy; Adi Putra; Nanu Baharudin; Raja Farah
- Music by: Farul Farid
- Production companies: KasehDia Pictures; Blackbox Pictures
- Distributed by: KasehDia Pictures
- Release dates: 12 August 2010 (Malaysia Film Festival); 27 January 2011 (Malaysia)
- Country: Malaysia
- Language: Malay
- Budget: RM 2.5 million
- Box office: RM 800,000

Haq is a 2010 Malaysian Malay-language fantasy action film directed by CL Hor and Jumaatun Azmi. The film follows two brothers with both good and evil powers, who must either overcome or succumb to their own demons when they finally confront each other.

== Plot ==
Haq and Bad are Tuan Haji Ibrahim's adopted brothers. Haq is endowed with power and is capable of removing objects with the power of the mind. Unlike Haq who has good personality and wisdom, Bad is more rebellious and stubborn. To Bad's stubbornness, their mother died before their eyes. After adulthood, Bad likes to be friends with thugs as opposed to Haq who continues his studies.

== Cast ==
- Zul Huzaimy as Haqim "Haq" Ibrahim
- Adi Putra as Badrul "Bad" Ibrahim
- Nanu Baharuddin as Zahra
- Raja Farah as Aina
- Fatimah Abu Bakar as Mak Lang/Nun
- Zulkifli Ismail as Tuan Haji Ibrahim
- Ammar Adli Bin Mohamed Norin as young Haq
- Amirul Adli Bin Mohamed Norin as young Bad
- Shamsuri Baki as Pak Lang/Ilyas
