= Jit Murad =

Malaysian actor, writer, playwright, and theater activist (1960–2022)

- جيت مراد
- Born: Aziz Mirzan bin Murad; 17 January 1960; Alor Setar, Kedah, Malaya (now Malaysia)
- Died: 12 February 2022 (aged 62); Kuala Lumpur, Malaysia
- Education: Sociology (Urban Studies) and Master’s Degree in Art History
- Occupations: Actor, writer, playwright, theater activist
- Years active: 1987–2022

Aziz Mirzan Murad (17 January 1960 – 12 February 2022) was a Malaysian actor, writer, playwright and theatre activist, who was mostly active in film, television and theatre. Known universally by the nickname 'Jit', he was the eldest son of former Director-General of Education of Malaysia, Murad bin Mohamed Noor (10 April 1930 – 22 Januari 2008).

== Life and career ==
Educated at Victoria Institution in the 1970s, he went on to study sociology and urban planning in Chicago, before obtaining a master's degree in 20th Century Art History in San Francisco.

He returned to Malaysia and in December 1989, he co-founded the Instant Cafe Theatre Company which gained a following for its biting social and political satire.

His first play Gold Rain and Hailstones (1992) was staged in Kuala Lumpur, Penang and Singapore.

In 1993 Murad helped start Dramalab, an arm of ICT specifically dedicated to encouraging new writing.

His notable works included Storyteller (1996), based on South-East Asian spoken traditions, Visits (2002), a reworked version of a 1990s comedy, and Spilt Gravy On Rice (2002), which won four awards at the inaugural Cameronian Arts Award 2003.

He was also a noted standup comedian and scriptwriter.

== Death ==
He died in his home in Kuala Lumpur on 12 February 2022, at the age of 62 due to cardiac arrest. He was buried at the Bukit Kiara Muslim Cemetery in Kuala Lumpur.

== Filmography ==
=== Films ===
Year	Title
1990	Mat Gelap
1992	Selubung
1995	Beyond Rangoon
1999	Perempuan Melayu Terakhir
2000	Mimpi Moon
2007	Waris Jari Hantu
2007	1957: Hati Malaya
2009	Talentime
2022	Spilt Gravy on Rice

=== Television ===
Year	Title
1995	Dunia Rees dan Ina
2003	Neon
2004	Ah-Ha

=== Stage ===
Year	Title
1987	Caught in The Middle
1993	Gold Rain & Hailstones
1996	The Storyteller
2003	Jit Hits The Fan
2007	Full of Jit
2009	One Load of Bull Jit

== Bibliography ==
- Jit Murad. Jit Murad Plays. Matahari Books (2017). ISBN 9789672128182
- Jit Murad. Two Things. Rhino Press (1997). ISBN 9839476033
