= Azean Irdawaty =

Malaysian actress and singer (1950–2013)

- ازيان ارداوتي
- Born: Azean Irdawaty binti Yusoef; February 27, 1950; Alor Setar, Kedah, Federation of Malaya (now Malaysia)
- Died: December 17, 2013 (aged 63); Petaling Jaya, Selangor, Malaysia
- Resting place: Bukit Kiara Muslim Cemetery, Damansara, Kuala Lumpur
- Other name: Kak Yan
- Occupations: Actress, singer
- Years active: 1970–2013
- Spouse: Khairil Anwar Zainal Mokhtar Rashidi (m. 1980; died 2013)
- Children: 3 (including Benjy)

Azean Irdawaty binti Yusoef (27 February 1950 – 17 December 2013) was a Malaysian actress and singer, whose career spanned 40 years.

== Personal life ==
Irdawaty began her singing career in 1970, and also had a film and television acting career.

== Death ==
In 2008, she was diagnosed with cancer. On the night of 9 December 2013, she was admitted to the University Malaya Medical Centre (UMMC) after falling unconscious. Azean Irdawaty died from liver failure, caused by cancer, on 17 December, aged 63. On 18 December 2013, she was buried at the Bukit Kiara Muslim Cemetery in Damansara, Kuala Lumpur.

== Filmography ==
=== Film ===
Year	Title	Role	Notes
1970	Di-Belakang Tabir		
1975	Anak Seluang Jauh Melaut		
1980	Esok Masih Ada	Faridah	
1981	Perjanjian Syaitan	Ribut	
1981	Mama Oh Mama	Rohani	
1982	Langit Petang	Ruby	
1988	Perempuan	Mahani	
1991	Bintang Malam	Ibu Ayam	
1996	Sutera Putih	Shalin	
1996	Amelia	Kalsom	
1997	Gemerlapan	Mother Mimi	
1997	Layar Lara	Auntie@Seniwati Zai	
1997	Baginda	Teacher Azian	
1999	Burung Besi	My Lady	
2000	Anaknya Sazali	Maria	
2003	Laila Isabella	Datin Jasmine	
2005	Kemarau Cinta	Dahlia	
2005	Anak Mami Kembali	Mak Bee	
2006	Main-Main Cinta	Prof. Azean	
2006	Diva Popular	Julia Gautiasana Larva	
2007	Waris Jari Hantu	Tok Wan Rimau	
2007	Otai	Puan Farah	
2007	Nana Tanjung 2	Mami Jay	
2009	Talentime	Embun	

=== Television series ===
Year	Title	Role	TV channel
1975	Dadah		TV1
1978	Aku Anak Wayang		TV1
1983	Panggilan Pusara		TV1
1999	Idaman	Datin Ruby	Astro Ria
2003	Orang Gaji 41	Azizah	TV3
2004	Sephia		TV3
2004	Dalam Hati Ada Cinta	Nurul	Astro Ria
2004	Salina		TV3
2005	Salina 2		TV3
2005	Dalam Hati Ada Cinta 2	Nurul	Astro Ria
2006	Mya Zara	Datin Aisyah	TV3
2007	Datin Diaries	Datin Mary	TV3
2007	Kasih Suci	Puan Zain	TV3
2009	Waris	Tok Wan Rimau	TV2

=== Telemovie ===
Year	Title	Role	TV channel
1985	Satu Pegangan		TV1
1990	Tackle Suami		TV3
1990	Hanya Kerana Aku Seorang Perempuan		TV1
1994	Ratu Jamu		TV3
1995	Reflek		TV1
1996	Orang Gaji		TV3
1997	Kompromi		TV1
2003	Aduhai Esah	Esah Mother	TV3
2003	Kondo Madu	Rohana	TV2
2003	Aisah Lima Puluh Sen	Aisah	Astro Ria
2003	Orang Gaji 2 (Bomoh)		VCD
2003	Hanya Untukmu		TV3
2004	Tanah Kubur	Datin Yvonne	Astro Ria
2007	Sangga Saadah	Mak Long	TV3
2011	Hati Seorang Ibu	Mak Som	Astro Prima
