= Kavita Sidhu =

Malaysian actress

- ਕਵਿਤਾ ਕੌਰ ਸਿੱਧੂ
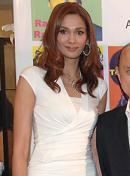
- Sidhu in 2011
- Born: Kavita Kaur Sidhu; 29 November 1971 (age 54); Ipoh, Perak, Malaysia
- Occupations: TV Presenter, actress, model, entrepreneur, film producer
- Years active: 1990–present
- Height: 178 cm (5 ft 10 in)
- Title: Miss Charm International Malaysia 1990; Miss Charm International 1990 (Winner)
- Spouse: Roberto Guiati (m. 2016)

Kavita Sidhu (Punjabi: ਕਵਿਤਾ ਕੌਰ ਸਿੱਧੂ, romanized: Kavita Kaur Sidhu; born 29 November 1971) is a Malaysian actress and former beauty queen. She is of Indian Punjabi ancestry.

== Career ==
Sidhu won the Miss Charm International title in 1990. She has been listed in the Malaysia Book of Records as the first Malaysian to have won an international beauty pageant title. Sidhu has modelled for Jean-Louis Scherner in Paris and Escada in Munich. In 2009, Sidhu modelled a RM100million diamond-encrusted dress by Mouawad at the STYLO Fashion Grand Prix KL.

=== Acting ===
She has appeared in Malaysian films such as Layar Lara, Mimpi Moon and Pontianak Harum Sundal Malam I & II. She has also delved into theatre productions with Fat Girl's Revenge, which was staged by The Actors Studio.

=== Venture into fashion ===
In 2010, Sidhu launched her own clothing line at the STYLO Fashion Grand Prix KL. In 2014, Sidhu was chosen as one of feature designers for the Kuala Lumpur Fashion Week.

== Personal life ==
In January 2016, Sidhu married Italian geologist Roberto Guiati. The wedding reception was held at Grand Hyatt Kuala Lumpur.

== Filmography ==
=== Film ===
Year	Title	Role	Notes
1997	Layar Lara	Zizie	First film debut
2000	Mimpi Moon	Vina (Davina David)	
2004	Pontianak Harum Sundal Malam	Ana	
2005	Pontianak Harum Sundal Malam II	Ana	
2007	Waris Jari Hantu	Ira	
2007	1957 Hati Malaya	Khalilah	
2013	Tanda Putera	Kara	
