= Pontianak Harum Sundal Malam =

2004 Malaysian film

- Directed by: Shuhaimi Baba
- Written by: Shuhaimi Baba
- Produced by: Shuhaimi Baba; Aida Fitri Buyong (executive); Mahyidin Mustakim (executive)
- Starring: Maya Karin; Azri Iskandar; Rosyam Nor
- Cinematography: Mohd Filus Ghazali
- Edited by: Mior Hashim Manap
- Music by: Ajai
- Production company: Pesona Pictures
- Distributed by: Skop Productions
- Release date: 20 May 2004 (Malaysia)
- Country: Malaysia
- Language: Malay
- Budget: MYR 2.2 million
- Box office: MYR 3.2 million

Pontianak Harum Sundal Malam, (English: Pontianak Scent of the Tuber Rose) is a 2004 Malaysian Malay-language horror film directed and written by Shuhaimi Baba starring Maya Karin, Azri Iskandar and Rosyam Nor. The storyline of the film revolves around a restless female ghost who wants to avenge her death.

Produced by Persona Pictures, starring Maya Karin, the film is about a restless spirit (pontianak) Meriam who seeks revenge upon those who killed her. The film was a major box office success in Malaysia. It was one of the first horror films to be released after the relaxation of 1990s censorship laws.

A sequel, Pontianak Harum Sundal Malam 2, was released on 24 November 2005. It is about Meriam continuing her revenge on the family of Marsani until Zali, a son of Marsani dies for saving her daughter Maria.

== Plot ==
The narrative unfolds through a series of mysterious events that transpire across two eras: the past and the present. In the late 1940s, gamelan prima donna Meriam (Maya Karin) finds herself torn between the affections of two men, Marsani (Azri Iskandar) and Danial (Shahronizam Noor). Ultimately, Meriam chooses Danial, inciting jealousy in Marsani. Tragically, Meriam is later discovered dead while pregnant with her first child. Following this event, the village becomes increasingly unsafe as various terrifying incidents occur. Marsani lives in constant fear, plagued by nightmares of Meriam, who is rumoured to be a vampire.

More than 50 years later, Marsani continues to live out the remainder of his life, yet the memory of Meriam lingers. A strange occurrence unfolds when a girl named Maria (Maya Karin), whose face bears an uncanny resemblance to Meriam's, appears. Coincidentally, Maria is a close friend of Marsani's grandson, Norman (Eizlan Yusof), and his fiancée, Anna (Kavita Sidhu). Once again, peculiar occurrences ensue, and this time, Maria is accused of being a vampire by Marsani. The critical question arises: who is Maria, and what connection does she share with Meriam?

== Cast ==
- Maya Karin as Meriam, whose death brought about the Pontianak
- Azri Iskandar as Marsani, Daniel's love rival, Meriam's killer, Zali's father, Asmadi's adopted son, Yuli's husband
- Rosyam Nor as Asmadi, Marsani's adopted son
- Ida Nerina as Sitam, Meriam's caretaker
- Kavita Sidhu as Anna, Norman's wife
- Eizlan Yusof as Norman, Asmadi's adopted son
- Nanu Baharuddin as Laila, Meriam's cousin, Maria's aunt and foster mother, Sitam's friend
- Shahronizam Noor as Daniel, Meriam's husband
- Sharifah Aleya as Rafiah, Asmadi's girlfriend (dead)
- Aziz Sattar as Tok Selampit, Meriam's dance teacher
- Adam Hamid as Man, Meriam's servant
- Yusmal Ghazali as Sarjono, Marsani's bodyguard
- Nadia Mustafar as Yuli, Marsani's wife and Zali's mother
- Adam Corrie as Chong, Marsani's bodyguard
- Soffi Jikan as Amang
- Afdlin Shauki as Penghulu Madura
- Bob Azrai as Orang Madura
- Azwan Ali as Tengku Mahkota Sultan
- Sophia Ibrahim as Datin
- Wahid Satay as Pembesar Istana I
- Aimi Jarr as Pembesar Istana II
- Shah Rezza as Pembesar Istana III
- Sandra Sodhy as Tetamu Istana I
- Rueben Oas as Tetamu Istana II
- Hushairy Hussein as Kassim
- Haiza as Zai, Anna's employee and Asmadi's wife

== Themes ==
Pontianak Harum Sundal Malam is, according to film scholar Rosalind Galt, a feminist version of the pontianak film genre in Malaysia.
