= Pontianak Harum Sundal Malam 2 =

2005 Malaysian film

Pontianak Harum Sundal Malam II
- Directed by: Shuhaimi Baba
- Written by: Shuhaimi Baba; Halina Samad
- Starring: Maya Karin; Rusdi Ramli; Rosyam Nor; Ida Nerina
- Distributed by: Pesona Pictures
- Release date: November 24, 2005 (Malaysia)
- Running time: 114 minutes
- Country: Malaysia
- Language: Malay
- Budget: MYR 2.3 million (estimated)

Pontianak Harum Sundal Malam 2 (English: Pontianak Scent of the Tuber Rose 2) is a 2005 Malaysian Malay-language horror movie directed and written by Shuhaimi Baba released in Malaysia on 24 November 2005. It is the sequel to Pontianak Harum Sundal Malam (2004). This film starring Maya Karin, Rusdi Ramli, Rosyam Nor and Ida Nerina.

== Plot ==
Following Marsani's death, Meriam continues to haunt all of Marsani's descendants. She begins by causing Zali to lose his memory and vanish. She also abducts Asmadi's daughter, Diana, believing her to be her own child. Meriam vows to seek revenge until her possessions are fully returned. Maria subsequently meets Joyo, a horse trainer, who has been entrusted with her care. However, Joyo betrays this trust when he is overwhelmed by lust and desires Meriam, who is now inhabiting Maria’s body. Bayang is now tasked with persuading Meriam to return Maria's body and to resolve all grievances between Meriam and Marsani's descendants.

== Cast ==
- Maya Karin in the dual role as:
  - Meriam: Maria's mother, Laila's cousin, Danial's wife
  - Maria: Meriam and Danial's daughter, Laila's niece and foster daughter, Bayang's friend
- Rusdi Ramli as Zali alias Joyo: Marsani's son, Asmadi's foster brother, Tok Guru's assistant
- Rosyam Nor as Asmadi: Marsani's foster son, Zali's foster brother, Zai's husband, Norman's foster father
- Ida Nerina as Bayang: Sitam's younger sister, Maria's friend
- Kavita Sidhu as Ana: Norman's wife
- Nanu Baharuddin as Laila: Meriam's cousin, Maria's aunt and foster mother
- Zahim Albakhri as Tok Guru; Kuda Kepang dance teacher, Tok Selampit's relative
- Aziz Sattar as Tok Selampit: Meriam and Laila's dance teacher
- Haiza as Zai: Asmadi's wife
- Pierre Andre as Purnama: Bayang's friend
- Zaibo as trishaw rider
- Shahronizam Noor as Danial: Meriam's husband, Maria's father
- Dilla Ahmad as Kalsom: servant of Asmadi's family
- Khir Rahman as Tok Urut
- Aznil Nawawi as a man lover
- Raja Azura as a woman lover
- Romi Suhendra as Pengangkat Najis
- S. Shamsuddin as Sitam and Bayang's father
- Rosnani Jamil as Mak Long
- Mariani as Mak Mah
- Azri Iskandar as Marsani: Zali's father, Marsani's foster father
- Yusmal Ghazali as Sarjono

== Awards and nominations ==
Award	Category	Receiver	Decision
19th Malaysian Film Festival	Best Film Director	Shuhaimi Baba	Won
19th Malaysian Film Festival	Best Movie	Pontianak Scent of the Tuber Rose 2	Nominated
19th Malaysian Film Festival	Best Male Actor	Rusdi Ramli	Nominated
19th Malaysian Film Festival	Best Actress	Maya Karin	Nominated
19th Malaysian Film Festival	Best Screenplay	Suhaimi Baba, Halina Samad	Nominated
19th Malaysian Film Festival	Best Original Story	Shuhaimi Baba	Nominated
19th Malaysian Film Festival	Best cinematography Mohd Filus	Nominated	
19th Malaysian Film Festival	Best Editor	Kamaruddin Abu	Nominated
19th Malaysian Film Festival	Best Original Music Score	Shamsul Cairel	Nominated
19th Malaysian Film Festival	Best Art Stylist	Kamarul Nizam, Aida Buyong	Won
19th Malaysian Film Festival	The Best Sound Designer	Ibrahim Elias	Nominated
19th Malaysian Film Festival	Best Supporting Actress	Ida Nerina	Nominated
19th Malaysian Film Festival	Best Original Theme Song	Ku Seru - Ajai	Won
19th Malaysian Film Festival	Best Costume/Fashion Designer	Dee Hasnan	Nominated
19th Malaysian Film Festival	Best Poster	Pesona Pictures Sdn Bhd	Nominated

== Soundtrack ==
No.	Title	Writer(s)	Composer	Length
1.	"Ku Seru" (sing by Misha Omar)	Shuhaimi Baba	Ajai	4:25
Total length:				4:25

== Possible sequel ==
Maya Karin revealed in August 2019 that the idea for the third sequel of Pontianak Harum Sundal Malam is in the works.
