= Shuhaimi Baba =

Malaysian film director

Yang Berbahagia Datin Paduka Shuhaimi Baba DSIS
- شوهيمي بابا
- Born: Shuhaimi binti Baba; 27 January 1967 (age 59); Seremban, Negeri Sembilan, Malaysia
- Education: King George V School, Seremban
- Occupations: Director, writer, producer
- Years active: 1984–present

Datin Paduka Shuhaimi Baba (born 27 January 1967), is a Malaysian film director. She was born in Negeri Sembilan.

== Filmography ==
=== Film ===
Year	Title	Also credited as			Notes
Year	Title	Director	Writer	Producer	Notes
1992	Selubung	Yes	Yes	No	
1995	Ringgit Kasorrga	Yes	Yes	Yes	
1997	Layar Lara	Yes	Yes	Yes	
2000	Mimpi Moon	Yes	Yes	Yes	
2004	Pontianak Harum Sundal Malam	Yes	Yes	Yes	
2005	Pontianak Harum Sundal Malam 2	Yes	Yes	Yes	
2007	Waris Jari Hantu	Yes	Yes	Yes	
2007	1957: Hati Malaya	Yes	Yes	Yes	
2013	Tanda Putera	Yes	Yes	Yes	

=== Television ===
Year	Title	Also credited as			TV channel	Notes
Year	Title	Director	Writer	Producer	TV channel	Notes
1984	Maria	Yes	No	No	TV3	
2009–2010	Waris	Yes	Yes	Yes	TV2	

== Honour ==
- Selangor
  - Knight Companion of the Order of Sultan Sharafuddin Idris Shah (DSIS) – Datin Paduka (2008)

== Awards and nominations ==
- Special Jury Award (Layar Lara) 6th Pyongyang International Film Festival in North Korea, 1998
- Best Director for Foreign Film (Layar Lara) Brussels International Independent Film Festival in Belgium, 1997
- Best Film (Layar Lara) 13th Malaysia Film Festival, 1997
- Best Director (Layar Lara) 13th Malaysia Film Festival, 1997
