= Kopitiam (TV series) =

Malaysian situation comedy

Kopitiam was a Malaysian situation comedy shown on NTV7 from 1998 to 2003 for seven seasons. Its cast members were Joanna Bessey, Lina Teoh, Douglas Lim, Rashid Salleh, Tan Jin Chor and Mano Maniam. The show was also given nods at the Asian Television Awards; first taking the runner up place for Best Sitcom category in 1998 and then later winning the "Highly Commended for Best Comedy Program title" in 2000.

Kopitiam was produced by Double Vision with creator Ng Ping Ho.
