= Waris Jari Hantu =

- Directed by: Shuhaimi Baba
- Produced by: Shuhaimi Baba
- Starring: Maya Karin; Rusdi Ramli; Azean Irdawaty
- Distributed by: Grand Brilliance; Persona Pictures
- Release date: May 31, 2007
- Running time: 105 minutes
- Country: Malaysia
- Language: Malay
- Budget: MYR 1.5 million
- Box office: MYR 1,743,000

Waris Jari Hantu (English: Ghost Finger's Heir) is a 2007 Malaysian Malay-language horror film directed by Shuhaimi Baba starring Rusdi Ramli, Maya Karin and Azean Irdawaty. The film won Rusdi Ramli, one of its lead actors, The Best Actor award at the 20th Malaysia Film Festival.

== Plot ==
Tok Wan Rimau (Azean Irdawaty) is the elderly custodian of a hereditary tiger spirit who uses her knowledge of herbalism and massage for healing. She seeks a female heir to her powers which are traditionally passed from mother to daughter. Tina (Maya Karin) and Ari (Rusdi Ramli) are the relatives of Tok Wan. They are also best friends. Tok Wan's spiritual tiger protects her family and their village from harm. Tina, who is in love with Ari, nurtures her secret dream of marrying him even though the villagers often ridicule the effeminate Ari as a sissy. Deeply traumatised by these insults, Ari continues to hide behind his close relationship with Tina. Despite parental objections, Tina seems destined to be the next in line as custodian of the mystical tiger. But Ari steps in, offering himself instead.

== Cast ==
- Maya Karin as Tina
- Rusdi Ramli as Ari
- Azean Irdawaty as Tok Wan Rimau
- Liza Othman as Hayati
- Zahim Albakri as Johan
- Nanu Baharudin as Kasma
- Riezman Khuzaimi as Roslan
- Kavita Sidhu as Ira
- Zaidi Omar as Pak Ngah Jalal
- Rashid Salleh as Ah Chong
- Joanna Bessey as Kate
- Ida Nerina as Bank Teller
- Jit Murad as Freddie
- Dang Suria as Fara

== Soundtrack ==
- Faizal Tahir - Kasih Tercipta
- Tria - Tika
- Maya Karin & Rusdi Ramli - Tika
- Kavita Sidhu - Cinta Sempurna
- Azean Irdawaty - Lagu Tok Wan
- Instrumental - Kasih Tercipta
- Instrumental - Tika
- Instrumental - Cinta Sempura
- Music Score - Serangan Rimau
- Music Score - Turun Saka

== Production ==
Filming had been done in several locations namely Kuala Lumpur and the states of Pahang and Negeri Sembilan; the latter state being the origin of the myth of the were-tiger in which the film revolves around.

To prepare for the role as Tok Wan, Azean had practiced imitating the moves of a tiger for many hours a day on set, even to a point of watching several documentaries from Animal Planet and National Geographic as reference.
