= Malaysia Film Festival =

Film festival in Malaysia

Malaysia Film Festival / Festival Filem Malaysia (FFM)
- Awarded for: Excellence in film achievements
- Country: Malaysia
- Presented by: FINAS, GAFIM
- First award: 13 April 1980
- Website: https://www.finas.gov.my/festival-filem-malaysia/

Malaysia Film Festival (FFM; Malay: Festival Filem Malaysia) is an annual awards ceremony organized by the Entertainment Journalists Association of Malaysia to honour excellence in Malaysian film. It is considered to be Malaysia's own equivalent to the Academy Awards and it is one of the major entertainment awards presented in Malaysia, alongside the Anugerah Bintang Popular for the entire entertainment industry (similar to the Anugerah Skrin) and Anugerah Industri Muzik for the music industry.

The events used to be hosted by the Persatuan-Persatuan Kebudayaan mainly in Singapore to recognise excellence in the film industry especially Malay films. Upon the establishment of the Entertainment Journalists Association of Malaysia, FFM was appropriately schemed and outlined in a way to help and oversee the progress of Malaysia's own Malay films, in which their production and direction by the Malaysian people itself would be able to compete with those of international films brought into the nation.

The first Malaysia Film Festival (or FFM1) ceremony was held on 11–13 April 1980, at the Nirwana Ballroom, Hilton Hotels in Kuala Lumpur to honour outstanding film achievements during the period. The most recent ceremony, honouring films made in 2014 were held at Plenary Hall, KLCC, Kuala Lumpur on 5 September 2015.

== History ==
The first awards were presented on 13 April 1980, at the Nirwana Ballroom, Hilton Hotels as a closing ceremony for the first festival ever in which the opening ceremony on 11 April, was being opened officially by the then Minister of Information, Tan Sri Mohammad Rahmat at the Federal Cinema of Kuala Lumpur. During this first awards and festival ceremony, only sixteen films were competing and awards were divided into three categories which are Heavy Drama (HD), Light Drama (LD) and Comedy (K).

At the time of the hosting of the third ceremony, FFM was no longer being organised by Entertainment Journalists Association of Malaysia, but instead taken over by Malaysia National Film Development (FINAS) after the second organisation of the awards ceremony. FINAS stood alone in organising the next three ceremonies notably starting from 1982 up to 1984. In the beginning of the FFM6, the ceremony was once again taken over by a different organiser, this time by the Federation of Film Artistes’ Association of Malaysia (GAFIM) after its establishment with the collaboration of FINAS.

The FFM 7, which was held on 6 December 1987, was the first to be held outside of Selangor and Kuala Lumpur. The event was held in Malacca.

The first Best Actor category was won by Jins Shamsuddin for his performance in Tiada Esok Bagimu; while Azean Irdawaty took home the Best Actress trophy for her performance in Esok Masih Ada.

== Trophy statuette ==
=== Design ===
The FFM main trophy's physical design consists of four pillars that merge to open the lock together at the top of the circle globe. Part of the base is engraved with each category winner. The pillars are made of gold coated pewter and are designed to resemble film rolls, symbolising the rapid growth of the local film industry. These four pillars also represent the four main stages of film production namely pre-production, production, post-production and promotion.

The trophy is made of black acrylic, gold plated pewter and white acrylic. It stands at a height of 13 inches and a width of 4 inches.

== Awards contested ==
Among the contested awards in the festival:

=== Prime awards ===
There are 13 contested awards:

- Malaysia Film Festival for Best Film
- Malaysia Film Festival for Best Director
- Malaysia Film Festival for Best Actor
- Malaysia Film Festival for Best Actress
- Malaysia Film Festival for Best Screenplay
- Malaysia Film Festival for Best Original Story
- Malaysia Film Festival for Best Cinematography
- Malaysia Film Festival for Best Editing
- Malaysia Film Festival for Best Original Music Score
- Malaysia Film Festival for Best Documentary
- Malaysia Film Festival for Best Short Film
- Malaysia Film Festival for Best Digital Film
- Malaysia Film Festival for Best Animated Feature Film

=== Creative awards ===
There are 12 contested awards:

- Best Supporting Actor
- Best Supporting Actress
- Best Art Direction
- Best Sound Direction
- Best Child Actor
- Best New Actor
- Best New Actress
- Best Original Theme Song
- Best Costume Designer
- Best Poster
- Best Comedy Film
- Best Digital Film
- Best Animated Feature Film
- Best Fight

== Controversy ==
=== Backlash for Best Film and Best Non-Bahasa Film categories ===
On 3 August 2016, the nominees list for the 28th Malaysian Film festival was revealed to the public. It came to attention that Jagat and Ola Bola, both of which were critically acclaimed and the latter being one of the highest grossing domestic films of all time, were disqualified from the Best Film category of FFM28 to be put instead in the Best Non-Bahasa Malaysia Film category. The reasoning given was that the films had not followed the criteria amount of the Bahasa Malaysia used, which is around 70 percent. The move was deemed to be undeserving and thus received intense backlash from both filmmakers and netizens alike, particularly from the Screenwriters Association of Kuala Lumpur and Selangor (PENULIS) whose president Alfie Palermo had lambasted it as "racist". Although the criticism for the categories is not recent (the 'Best Picture, non-Bahasa Malaysia' category had been established in 2011 where as the 'Best Screenplay' and 'Best Director' awards with the same subcategory were created in this award), this year's awards was the first time that the criticism for the categories had become so widespread.

Further suspicions of favouritism and conflict of interest also aroused from the fact that the nominees were put forward by the head of the Malaysian Film Producers Society (PFM), Yusof Haslam, who also owns SKOP Productions where two entries for the Best Film Category, Mat Moto and Munafik happened to be produced. Yusof however denied such allegations, stating that it was FINAS's authority to elect juries for the awards. He had also offered to resign from the post next year should the problem persist.

In expressing dissatisfaction for the list, director Afdlin Shauki had announced in his Facebook page on 4 August that he will boycott the festival. The move was lauded by CIMB Group chairman Nazir Razak and Air Asia CEO Tony Fernandes. The protest was also joined by cinematographer Mohd Nor Kassim, who was nominated for his work in Bravo 5, stating that the nominations' segregation by language "gave the impression that Malays were afraid of competing with non-Malays". Nor Kassim later returned his previously won awards, wrapped in a black plastic bag, to FINAS director Kamil Othman during the Tanya FINAS 2.0 forum in Kuala Lumpur. The assistant-general secretary of the Film Directors' Association of Malaysia (FDAM), Hafiz Ibrahim had also resigned in protest. On 6 August, Communications and Multimedia Minister Salleh Said Keruak stated to the press that he will meet up with FINAS officials over the increasingly volatile issue.

On 11 August, Salleh Said had announced in a press statement to BERNAMA that the Best Film Category shall be open to all entries regardless of language. FINAS also decided to cancel all "Non-Bahasa Malaysia" subcategories for the Best Director, Best Screenplay and Best Picture awards and create a new Best Picture in the National Language category in their place. This counterreaction however upset the Film Directors' Association of Malaysia (FDAM), where its secretary Datuk Rahim Awang announced that the guild will not take part in the ceremonies as the allowing of Bahasa and non-Bahasa films to compete in equal terms "was akin to insulting the Federal Constitution and showing disrespect to the Rukunegara". One of its excos and special project bureau head, Jeffrey Chiang submitted his letter of resignation to avoid association with the guild despite not agreeing himself with FDAM's stance.

In 2017, FINAS's director-general Fauzi Ayob had announced that a new encompassing category called "Best Film" will replace the two aforementioned Best Film categories in upcoming future awards, stating in a press conference that "this move will allow all nominees to compete on equal grounds".
