= 1957: Hati Malaya =

- Directed by: Shuhaimi Baba
- Written by: Shuhaimi Baba
- Produced by: Shuhaimi Baba; Aida Buyong
- Starring: Maya Karin; Rusdi Ramli; Sharifah Amani; Adlin Aman Ramlie
- Cinematography: Mohd. Filus Ghazali
- Edited by: Kamaruddin Abu
- Music by: Sharon Paul
- Production company: Pesona Pictures
- Release date: 25 October 2007 (Malaysia)
- Running time: 135 minutes
- Country: Malaysia
- Language: Malay
- Budget: MYR 3 million

1957: Hati Malaya (English: 1957: The Heart of Malaya) is a 2007 Malaysian Malay-language historical political drama film directed by Shuhaimi Baba starring Maya Karin, Rusdi Ramli, Sharifah Amani and Adlin Aman Ramlie. It was released on 25 October 2007.

== Synopsis ==
Four young Malaysians, Hali, Salmi, Ani and Rafiq have been assigned to do a picture book of "1957". While two of them grudgingly carry out the request made by the publisher, Hali takes on the role enthusiastically. Along the way, they find themselves immersed in the characters, emotional moments, identifying with and finding meaning in the struggle of "1957". They weave the story of independence by transporting themselves back to the past. Ordinary Malaysians who fell in love, and found their love for the country override their personal emotions. The present characters find new meaning to "Merdeka".

== Cast ==
- Maya Karin as Salmi/Normala
- Rusdi Ramli as Hali/Zahari
- Sharifah Amani as Ani/Aishah
- Adlin Aman Ramlie as Rafik/Rozhan
- Mohd Kamarulzaman Taib as Tunku Abdul Rahman
- Zaefrul Nordin as Dato' Onn Jaafar
- Bront Palarae as Muzafar
- Azhar Sulaiman as Anwar Abdul Malik
- Noor Azhar Murad as Tun Abdul Razak
- Nanu Baharuddin as Sharifah Rodziah
- Jins Shamsuddin as Sultan of Johor
- Iqram Dinzly as Ahmad Badawi
- Ida Nerina as Datin Halimah Hussein
- Liza Othman as Ibu Zain
- Rozie Othman as Putih Mariah Ibrahim Rashid
- Douglas Lim as Ang Lee / Ahli MCA
- Kee Thuan Chye as Tan Cheng Lock
- Chew Kin Wah as Tun H. S. Lee
- Chacko Vadaketh as E. E. C. Thuraisingham
- Megat Shahrizal as Ismail Abdul Rahman
- Azizi Mohd Said as Suleiman Abdul Rahman
- Man Bai as Hussein Onn
- Rahim Razali as Syeikh Abdullah Fahim
- Bell Ngasri as Sardon Jubir
- Mustapha Maarof as Sultan Selangor
- Jalaluddin Hassan as Sultan of Kedah
- Kuswadinata as Sultan of Perak
- Tan Sri Azahari Taib as Tan Sri Azahari Taib
- Zahim Albakri as Sir Edward Osni
- Ridzuan Hashim as Datuk Yahaya
- Adi Putra as Syed Alwi Al-Hadi
- Sani Sudin as 70-year-old Zahari
- Betty Banafe as Friend's Normala
- Jeremy Smeeton as General Sir Gerald Templer
- Kavita Sidhu as Khalilah
- Jit Murad as Tan Sri Dato' Khir Johari
- Azwan Razali as Villagers

== Soundtrack ==
Track list:

1. Hati - Siti Nurhaliza
2. Perlu Kamu - Ajai & Krisdayanti
