= Buli (film) =

- Directed by: Afdlin Shauki
- Screenplay by: Afdlin Shauki
- Produced by: Johari Amat; Lazizah Ahmad (executive)
- Starring: Afdlin Shauki; Hans Isaac; Nasha Aziz; Ako Mustapha; Sharifah Shahirah; AC Mizal; Patrick Teoh
- Production company: Grand Brilliance Sdn. Bhd.
- Release date: 11 March 2004
- Running time: 116 minutes
- Country: Malaysia
- Language: Malay
- Budget: MYR 1.50 million
- Box office: MYR 1.60 million

Buli (English: Bully) is a 2004 Malaysian Malay-language black comedy film directed by Afdlin Shauki in his directorial debut. The film stars Afdlin himself, along with Hans Isaac, Nasha Aziz, Ako Mustapha, and Sharifah Shahirah as well as cameo appearances from well-known Malaysian celebrities. Its sequel, Buli Balik was released in 2006.

== Plot ==
The plot of this film started with Nordin standing in the middle of the city of Kuala Lumpur as he gazed around him. Starting here, Nordin narrates the history of his life, including being a victim of bullying while in school while acknowledging not have many friends.

Nordin, 28 years old, still single and yet to be married, worked as a software designer at the Michaelsoft, a computer company owned by Tan Sri Michael (Patrick Teoh), Nordin was with Michaelsoft for three years. Meetings are held at the Michaelsoft headquarters, Tan Sri Michael announced sales of computer anti-virus software KABELUPUKOM Version 1.1, which has penetrated the world market. Nordin arrived at the office, and Tan Sri Michael announced that it has taken on new staff in the company. A Mitsubishi Lancer car came and hit the road marker for the disabled. The new staff is Roy, Nordin's childhood friend. Roy joined the company to lead the project creating the software security system for the Japanese company. When Nordin surprised by Roy's presence, he gets out of the meeting and has not had time to leave, Roy called him, as he dubbed it "Boyot".

Nordin remembers past events during the secondary school: In 1991, Roy sits level 3. Roy bullies Nordin by trying to insert his head in toilet. Apparently, it was a dream, Nordin screaming while immersing his head in a sink filled with water and sees the mirror. Roy came, and asked him to do working paper reports to clients. Nordin bridges itself in wall toilets and dreaming again, he turns into The Incredible Hulk with the rest of his body blue, while his clothes torn from his body as a result of growing up, and he scares Roy.

Nordin is insecure with his body shape and feels too ashamed with his fatty body. While exercising at the gym, he saw the 'Lu Slim Lah Beb' ('Lookin' Slim Babe') infomercial on television and tries to call the products' phone number. Roy celebrates his 28th birthday at the hotel and he brings Nordin together. He introduces him to his friends and humiliated him by calling him "Boyot" and gives him swimming trunks. At his home, Nordin calls Dr. Ika for help where he can undergo the therapy session. Meanwhile, Roy and his friends enjoy partying at the hotel's karaoke center. Rudy, who has a permanent scar on his face, came with a suitcase and shows them a lot of money in the suitcase which they liked. Rudy offers Roy to help him in a 'big project' which is robbing the bank using the software system that the company made and Rudy asking Roy not to double-cross him. After that, Rudy sang a Malay ballad tune, "Kau Kunci Cintaku Di Dalam Hatimu" ("You Locked My Love In Your Heart"), made famous by Ramlah Ram.

Nordin, was on medical leave, hanging out with Dr. Ika. Tan Sri Michael warns Roy to complete the client report, otherwise he would get fired by his boss. He insists that he rather be known by his nickname instead of his real name, Masron and asking Nordin's whereabouts. Nordin and Dr. Ika enjoy watching movies in cinema and later they eat at a restaurant where the skyline of KL was seen. The fireworks were displayed on the night of New Year celebration. Dr. Ika tells Nordin about his New Year Resolution and he replies to her that he is determined to undergo her therapy session this year. The fireworks continue to sparkle in the sky. While Nordin wants to go home, Roy came to him. He blames Nordin as he nearly got fired by the boss because the security system that their team needs to do not done yet. Roy then beats him without mercy although Nordin asking for apology and he warns Nordin to hand over the report to him and beats him again before leaving. Nordin's housemate, Shaf is so angry with Roy asking him to go to clinic to seek medical treatment after being beaten by Roy, but Nordin refused. Nordin tells Shaf that he has met an angel who will change his life, but Shaf asks him if he's okay?.

On the next day, Nordin came to the office. While in the lift, he was afraid of Roy. But Roy reconciled with Nordin by wanting to apologize. Roy tells Nordin that he was stressed, so he took his stress out on him. Nordin then hands over the report document to Roy. Roy asks Nordin to buy some food to eat while Nordin goes out to buy food, he tries to copy all of Nordin's work of the security system. He deletes all evidence that Nordin has in his computer and putting sleeping pills in his drink. When Nordin comes back, Roy is gone. He tried to open his computer, but failed. He slept over his desk until morning and only woke up after Tan Sri Michael came to take his security system to show to the Japanese but Nordin is unable to give it as it vanished from his computer. Roy came and acted as a hero as he told Tan Sri Michael that he has created the security system by himself in case anything happens to Nordin's. After failing to show his security system, Nordin was fired by his boss. Nordin tells Roy that his security system is his work but Roy says that nobody will trust him as he has no evidence to prove so. Roy tells Nordin that he can't do anything to him as he will always be better than him. Dr. Ika's younger sister, Ila suffers from asthma while doing exercise at the gymnasium. Ila tells her mother and sister that her ex-husband, Zul is to get married with the stewardess and pray for her ex-husband's happiness. Nordin comes home while his housemate, Shaf is watching the football match between Liverpool and Manchester United on TV. Shaf called him to watch the football match together, but is ignored by Nordin. Upset with what happened to him, Nordin grabs the knife and enters the bathroom to commit suicide, luckily Shaf comes to save him but unfortunately, Shaf failed to grab the knife from Nordin and the knife landed on his foot.

Meanwhile, Roy and Tan Sri Michael with their Japanese clients are having dinner at the restaurant. Rudy worked as the waiter there and tells them everything is alright. After the dinner time, Roy came to changing room and meets Rudy. He passed the software security system to Rudy and tells him to prepare when the security system's code is activated, so he can enter the bank. Shaf was at the hospital where he receives treatment due to injury of his foot. Nordin wants to explain what happened but Dr. Ika decided to use her authority to send him to the psychiatric ward of the hospital where she worked. After recovering from his foot injury, Shaf come back home and decided to take his belongings and no longer lives with Nordin. While in the psychiatric ward, Nordin speaks to an old man who is thinking of his children and the man explained to him that his children did not want claim that he is their father and his children no longer have any relationship with him anymore. Nordin decided to stay away from the old man who keeps telling about fathers as the old man insists he is not seeking apology from his children. Nordin then met Dr. Ika and tells her to prove that he is not insane and decided to get out from the hospital as he wants to claim his right at the Michaelsoft.

When Nordin goes home, his housemate, Shaf no longer lives with him. He decided to find the CD-ROM in his house, eventually found in his computer book. Rudy and his underlings enter the Allied Asian Bank and do their 'big project'. Nordin and Roy competed to access the software security system as Tan Sri Michael gave an instruction and will call the police if they failed to do so. While focusing on creating the system, both of them enter the fantasy realm where they became a robot and competed with each other. Back to the reality, Roy managed to access the system and tells his boss that his security system will be disabled in 3 minutes while Nordin is still working to access the system. Rudy and his underlings managed to rob the bank and decided to leave the bank immediately. Nordin managed to activate the software security system that shows he is the one who created it and prove Roy's wrongdoings. Rudy's underlings have been detained by the police before they left the bank, while the police conduct a raid on the bank, Rudy manages to escape when he realizes the police's presence while the security system on his laptop has been denied. Tan Sri Michael decided to call the police and Roy manages to escape when his criminal act was known by his boss and the rest of Michaelsoft staff after Nordin revealed Roy's wrongdoings. Tan Sri Michael is seeking apology from Nordin as he didn't trust him and Nordin is also seeking apology from his boss that he also has done wrong to him. Nordin decided to find his friend, Shaf.

Roy and Rudy is being hunted by the police. Roy's residence was raided by the police but he is not around there. Nordin managed to find Shaf and seeking forgiveness as well as talking to each other again. Roy, who has been hunted by the police due to his connection with the Allied Asian Bank robbery, still out there and taking an advantage to get revenge against Nordin. He wanted to hit Nordin with his car. Dr. Ika saw Roy driving and she tries to warn Nordin and Shaf but they didn't realize the actual situation that they are facing right now. Roy drives through the road even though the traffic light is red, so he crashes into the lorry that comes from the other side before he is able to hit Nordin and his car flips over. The lorry was driven by Rudy, who just committed another criminal act. Rudy becomes panicked when he saw there are people when he crashes into Roy, so he ran away from the accident scene. Nordin, Shaf, Dr. Ika and a taxi driver came to the accident scene and they saw Roy in his car. In the end, Nordin now lives happier and no longer afraid of Roy as he was involved in a road accident when he tried to crash into him. Nordin has gained shares from Michaelsoft and he becomes partner with his boss.

== Cast ==
- Afdlin Shauki as Nordin Bin Rohani, a computer software designer who has less confidence because of his body and victim bullied by Roy
- Nasha Aziz as Dr. Ika, Psychology specialist who helps Nordin and sister Ila also girlfriend of Jalal
- Hans Isaac as Masron Bin Haji Dasuki @ Roy, Main antagonist who bullies Nordin during school and mastermind robbery
- Ako Mustapha as Shaf, Nordin's friend who works as Tow Truck driver and fans of Manchester United, sometimes fan of Liverpool FC
- Hattan as Jalal, actor and boyfriend of Dr Ika
- Patrick Teoh as Tan Sri Michael, CEO Michaelsoft
- Sharifah Shahirah as Ila, little sister Dr Ika who has asthma
- Kartina Aziz as Dr. Ika and Ila's mum
- Ifa Raziah as Michaelsoft's clerk
- Soraya Dean as Suzy, Secretary for Tan Sri Michael
- AC Mizal as Rudy, Mobster leader who pays Roy
- Din Beramboi as host store Lu Silm La Beb and voice over news robbery
- Joanna Bessy as diet expert
- Jalil Hamid as patient mental hospital #1
- Harun Salim Bachik as patient mental hospital #2
- Riezman Khuzaimi as chicken seller

== Production ==
Buli is a directorial debut from Afdlin Shauki. Filming took place in Kuala Lumpur and Negeri Sembilan and its budget approximately RM 1.5 million in total. Afdlin's daughters, Miasara and Anais portray the children of the pilot portrayed by himself.

The film's screenplay was written by Afdlin while pursuing scriptwriting course at the National Film School in London, United Kingdom (UK) in 1996. The film is said to be produced by renowned Malaysian lyricist, Habsah Hassan while the female lead role was once offered to Erra Fazira and Sofia Jane before offered to Nasha Aziz. The main role is originally named Roslin, a bank clerk. But it was changed to Nordin, a computer software designer.

== Release and reception ==
Buli was released on 11 March 2004 to popular success. The film managed to gain RM 1.6 million upon its release. Suraiya Mohd Nor, reviewing for Berita Harian described the film as a "global phenomenon".

== Sequel ==
Its sequel, Buli Balik was released in 2006, after the success of the first film.
