= Asian Film Archive =

Singaporean non-governmental organisation

- Founder: Tan Bee Thiam
- Established: 2005
- Mission: Save, explore and share the art of Asian Cinema
- Chair: Glen Goei
- Staff: 11-15
- Key people: Karen Chan
- Address: 100 Victoria St. #04-01 National Library Building, Singapore 188064
- Location: Singapore, Singapore
- Coordinates: 1°17′51.7″N 103°51′16.4″E
- Interactive map of Asian Film Archive
- Website: https://www.asianfilmarchive.org

The Asian Film Archive (AFA) is a non-governmental organisation in Singapore that preserves the film heritage of Asian Cinema. The archive is located at the National Library Building along Victoria Street, a five-minute walk from Bugis MRT station (East-West Line).

== History ==
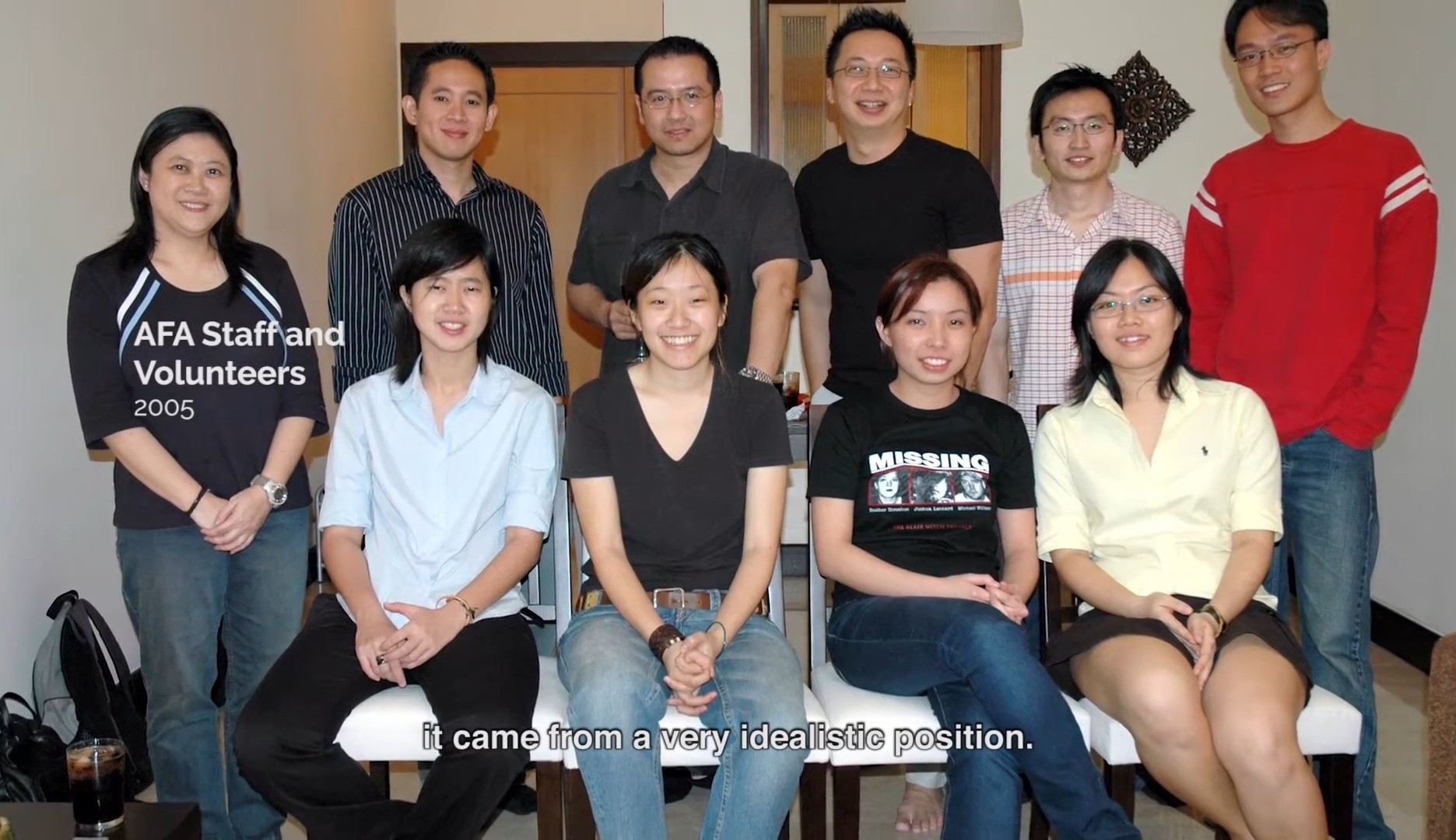
Staff and volunteers of the AFA in 2005

Founded in 2005, AFA preserves Asian films to encourage scholarly research on film, and to promote a wider critical appreciation of this art form. The archive has collected more than 2,000 titles, with a focus on classic Asian films and contemporary independent works from Southeast Asia. The Archive's outreach programmes encourage film literacy and find new audiences for films in its collection.

The Asian Film Archive is an affiliate of the International Federation of Film Archives (FIAF) and the Southeast Asia-Pacific Audiovisual Archive Association (SEAPAVAA). Amongst its international advisors are Ray Edmondson, David Bordwell and Apichatpong Weerasethakul.

Renowned scholar, Patricia Zimmermann described the work of the Asian Film Archive in Afterimage: The Journal of Media Art & Cultural Criticism and on the Open Spaces blog.

In June 2010, a group of Singapore filmmakers, including Tan Pin Pin, Royston Tan and Kelvin Tong, protested AFA's head Tan Bee Thiam's supposed conflict of interest. Their letter led to Tan's resignation as executive director in September.

In 2014, AFA became a subsidiary of the National Library Board.

In 2015, the archive commissioned Fragment, a film anthology by Lav Diaz, U-Wei Haji Saari, Sherman Ong and others. It premiered on 30 October at The Projector, a local cinema.

== Programmes ==
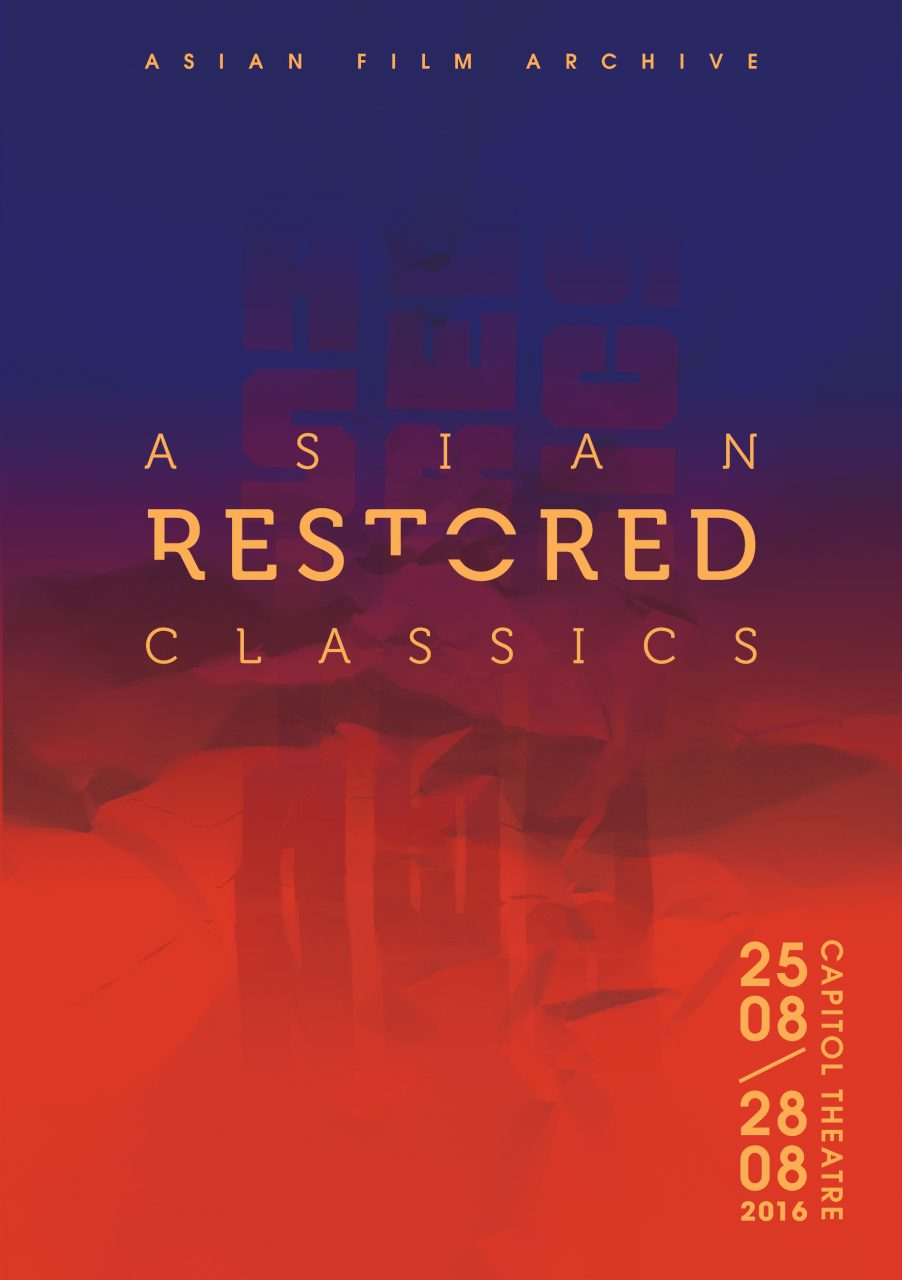
Asian Restored Classics 2016

=== Asian Restored Classics ===
Asian Restored Classics is an annual film festival that celebrates the best of Asian cinema. It provides a platform for the iconic classics that different institutions have restored to be appreciated by modern audiences.

Its first edition in 2016 featured Akira Kurosawa's Ran (1985) , King Hu's Dragon Inn (1967), Mike de Leon's Kakabakaba Ka Ba? (1980), John Woo's A Better Tomorrow (1986), Satyajit Ray's Charulata (1964) and Park Sang-Ho's Tosuni: The Birth of Happiness (1963).

=== State of Motion ===
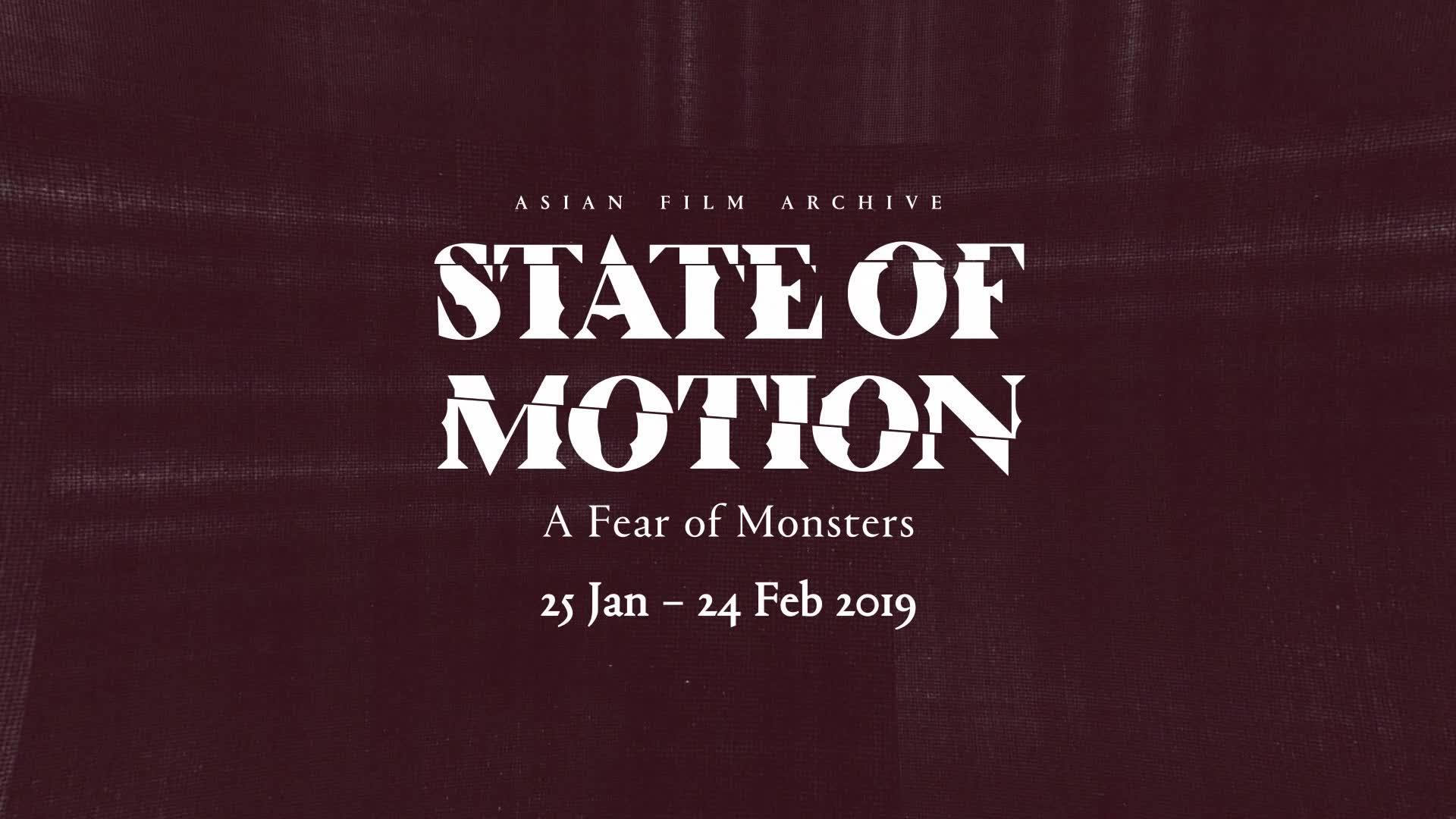
State of Motion 2019 - A Fear of Monsters

State of Motion is an annual multi-disciplinary event that revisits Singapore's cinematic history, exploring film as a document of time through exhibitions, screenings, tours and artistic responses.

=== Singapore Shorts ===
Singapore Shorts is an annual showcase celebrating the best and the most promising local short films in Singapore. Alongside screenings of the selected cinematic works, the programme also features post-screening discussions with the filmmakers, dedicated reviews from critics and a special section of older titles from the Asian Film Archive's collection.

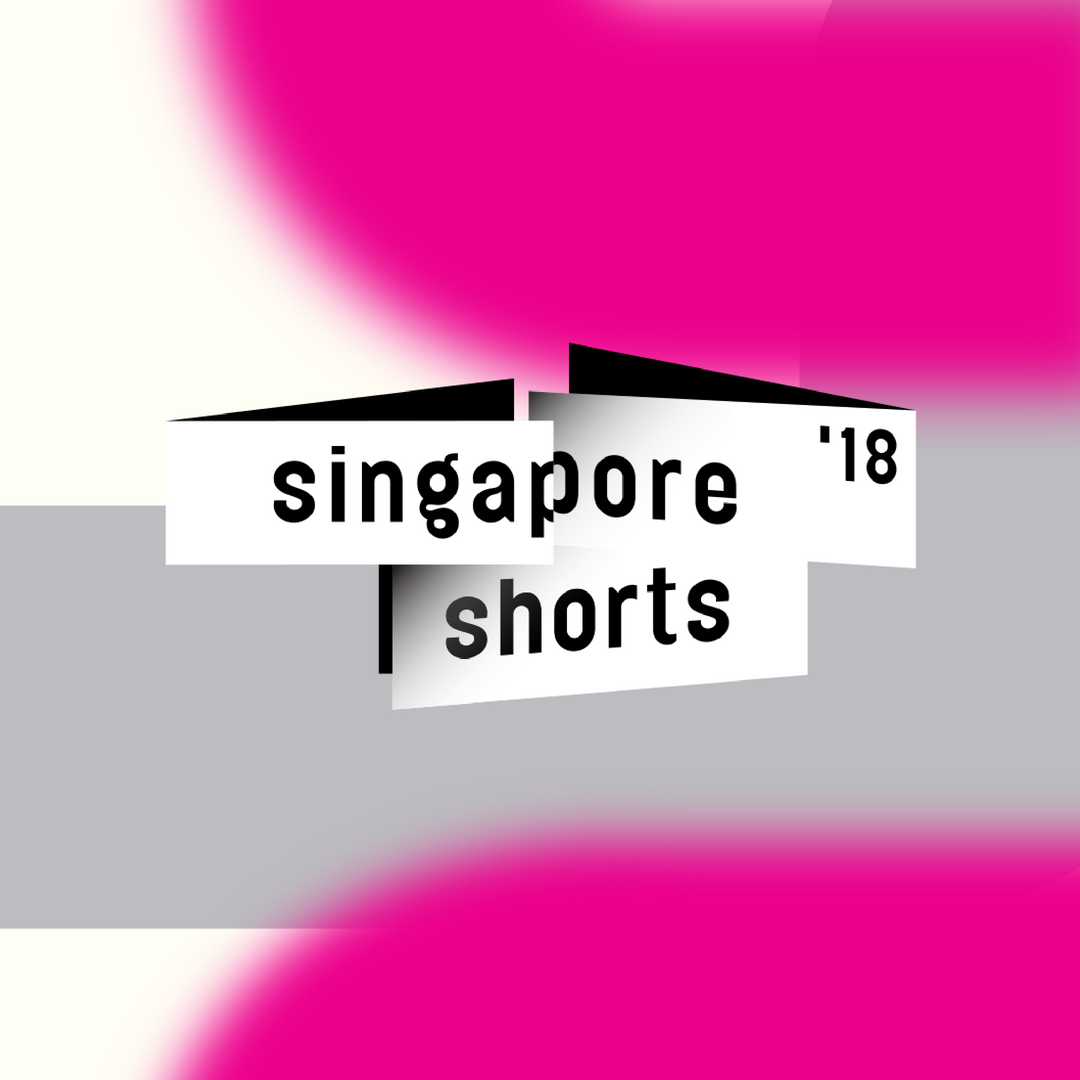
Singapore Shorts 2018

Thirteen short films were selected for its inaugural edition in 2018.

=== Reframe ===
Reframe is a salon series that constructs critical frameworks and examines topics surrounding cinema and the moving image through film showcases, panel discussions and presentations.

=== Alt Screen ===
Alt Screen is a film series, co-organised with the National Library Board, Singapore, to showcase Asian documentaries and offering interpretations of global issues and critical perspectives of humanity.

=== co:lab ===
Co-organised with library@esplanade, co:lab is a platform where new live works are experimented and presented through cross disciplinary encounters between film and performing arts.

== Collection ==
Notable films in the collection include the Cathay-Keris Malay Classics Collection: Hang Jebat by Hussain Haniff (1961), Mat Bond by Mat Sentul and M. Amin (1967) and Sumpah Pontianak by B.N. Rao (1958); Evolution of a Filipino Family by Lav Diaz (2004); Blink of an Eye by Mike de Leon (1981); Manila in the Claws of Neon by Lino Brocka (1975); The Arsonist by U-Wei Haji Saari (1995); The Big Durian by Amir Muhammad (2003); Da Huang Pictures Collection and the Woo Ming Jin Collection that document the works of the Malaysian New Wave filmmakers.

In 2014, The Cathay-Keris Malay Classics was inscribed into the UNESCO Memory of the World Asia-Pacific Regional Register.

In keeping with its efforts to encourage an appreciation of Asian films, the AFA makes its collection available for public access through a reference collection at the library@esplande and through the Lee Kong Chian Reference Library at the National Library Building.

== Cinema ==
AFA runs regular film programs at the Oldham Theatre, located at the National Archives of Singapore building along Canning Rise. The 132-seat cinema is equipped to exhibit films from 4K digital projection to traditional 35mm.

The cinema launched in April 2019 with a slate of 8 Asian horror films, including the classic Orang Minyak (1958) starring P. Ramlee, and its Hong Kong riff, Oily Maniac (1976).

== Restorations ==
To make more films available for viewing and research, the AFA restores films that have been preserved but are in deteriorating condition.

The restoration of Batch '81 (1983) was presented in the Venice Classics section during the 74th Venice International Film Festival in 2017.

AFA's restoration of Bambaru Avith (1978) was selected for Cannes Classic 2020.

Restorations done by year
Year	Film	Director
2020	Mat Magic (1971)	Mat Sentol
2020	Kaki Bakar (1995)	U-Wei Haji Saari
2020	Bambaru Avith (1978)	Dharmasena Pathiraja
2019	Permata Di-Perlimbahan (1952)	Haji Mahadi
2019	Aku Mahu Hidup (1970)	M. Amin
2019	Letter To An Angel (1994)	Garin Nugroho
2019	They Call Her Cleopatra Wong (1978)	Bobby A. Suarez
2019	They Call Him Chop Suey (1975)	Jim Goldman
2018	The Teenage Textbook Movie (1998)	Philip Lim
2018	Forever Fever (1998)	Glen Goei
2018	Cinta Kasih Sayang (1965)	Hussain Haniff
2018	Money No Enough (1998)	Tay Teck Lock
2018	Sunshine Singapore (1972)	Rajendra Gour
2018	Orang Minyak (1958)	L. Krishnan
2017	Batch '81 (1983)	Mike De Leon
2017	Ring of Fury (1973)	Tony Yeow & James Sebastian
2017	China Wife 唐山阿嫂 (1957)	Chan Man [陈文]
2017	Blood Stains in the Valley of Love 血染相思谷 (1957)	Chun Kim [秦剑] & Chor Yuen [楚原]
2017	Moon Over Malaya 椰林月 (1957)	Chun Kim [秦剑]
2017	Pyo Chit Lin (My Darling) (1950)	U Tin Myint
2015	Mee Pok Man (1995)	Eric Khoo
2015	Taming of the Princess 醉打金枝 (1958)	Xu Jiao Ming
2015	Chuchu Datok Merah (1963)	M. Amin
2015	The Lion City 狮子城 (1960)	Yi Sui
2015	Patah Hati (1952)	K.M Basker
2015	Gado Gado (1961)	S. Roomai Noor
2015	Sultan Mahmud Mangkat Dijulang (1961)	K.M. Basker

== See also ==
- List of film institutes
