= The Black Mate =

- Short story by Joseph Conrad
- Country: United States
- Language: English

Publication
- Published in: The London Magazine
- Publication date: April 1908

"The Black Mate" is a short story by Joseph Conrad which first appeared in The London Magazine in 1908, and was collected in Tales of Hearsay published by T. Fisher Unwin in 1925.

The work is notable as Conrad's first published work of fiction.

== Plot ==
Told as a first-person narrative, the story opens on the docks of London in the 1880s. The Sapphire, a merchant ship, has a new mate: Winston Bunter, a mature man in his late middle-age, whose jet-black hair earns him the sobriquet "The Black Mate." The ship is commanded by the bitter and mean-spirited Captain Johns.

The narrator of the tale repeatedly suggests that the mate has a secret which he carefully conceals: Bunter has dyed his prematurely white hair to black, so as not to look too old to be hired for a job that requires great vigor.

During the voyage, a running debate develops between captain and mate. Captain John maintains that supernatural powers directly influence the lives of humans; the mate Bunter is skeptical, and emphatically denies the existence of ghosts. The captain is exasperated by his mate's failure to convert to his spiritualism.

Bunter has brought bottles of black hair dye, which he applies to maintain his more youthful appearance. In heavy weather, the bottles are broken: without these, Bunter knows his ruse will soon be exposed to the captain and crew. When Bunter accidentally falls from a ladder, cutting his head, he has an epiphany. Without speech for two days, he reports to the captain that when climbing the ladder, he had seen a "manifestation", that is, a ghost. The frightening vision, he confesses, has turned his hair white instantly: "You were right!" Captain Johns is triumphant and welcomes his new convert.

The story ends happily. Bunter's wife inherits a legacy that provides enough for them to retire comfortably.

== Background ==
The original manuscript for "The Black Mate" was written in 1886, during which Conrad was studying for his master's certificate, which he qualified for that year This original draft, which no longer survives, was submitted to Tit-Bits literary journal in a prize competition, but was rejected.

In 1908, Conrad made revisions to "The Black Mate" and this version was published by London Magazine in April. Conrad permitted the story to be republished in 1922, noting that though the story was his initial foray into fiction, insisted that Almayer's Folly (1895) was his "first serious work." The story was included in the posthumous collection Tales of Hearsay in 1925.

== Critical Assessment ==
"It is a trivial story, told in a breezily colloquial style, and could equally been written light-heartedly for a rather low-grade magazine competition or as a pot-boiler to earn a few pounds." Literary critic Jocelyn Baines in Joseph Conrad: A Critical Biography (1960).

Literary critic Laurence Graver notes the influence of Alphonse Daudet during Conrad's apprenticeship as a writer:

Like the typical Daudet story, "The Black Mate" uses anecdotal reminiscences as a narrative frame, and employs deception and a trick ending to bring events to a happy close.

In this regard, the structure of "The Black Mate" resembles the short fiction of Guy de Maupassant. Graver writes:

Conrad's first story leans heavily on sentimental irony, steady suspense, mechanically developed characters, a colloquial style, a whimsical plot, and a surprise ending—traits rarely found in Conrad's best work. The central situation of "The Black Mate" is simply not very engaging, and even Conrad's dexterity cannot disguise the fact from the reader."

== Sources ==
- Baines, Jocelyn. 1960. Joseph Conrad: A Critical Biography. McGraw-Hill Book Company, New York. ISBN 978-0297167556
- Graver, Laurence. 1969. Conrad's Short Fiction. University of California Press, Berkeley, California. ISBN 0-520-00513-9
