= En bloc =

En bloc means "all together". It may refer to:

- En Bloc, a Singaporean television drama
- A type of ammunition loading in firearms
- Monobloc engine, an internal combustion engine with the cylinder head and block formed as one unit
