= Din Beramboi =

Malaysian comedian, actor, singer, cartoonist and radio DJ (1966–2010)

- Born: Meor Ahmad Fuad bin Meor Badri; 22 December 1966; Sungai Besi, Kuala Lumpur, Malaysia
- Died: 2 April 2010 (aged 43); Selayang, Selangor, Malaysia
- Resting place: Taman Ehsan Muslim Cemetery, Kepong, Kuala Lumpur
- Occupations: Comedian, radio announcer, television host, actor, singer, cartoonist
- Years active: 1990–2010
- Employer: Astro Radio (2009-10)
- Spouse: Suhaini Che Man (m. 1990–2010)
- Children: 3

Comedy career
- Medium: Television, film, radio and music
- Genres: Impersonation, Stand-up comic, Improvisation
- Subjects: Comedy and satire

Mior Ahmad Fuad bin Mior Badri (22 December 1966 – 2 April 2010), better known by his stage name Din Beramboi, was a Malaysian comedian, actor and radio DJ and was widely known as a talented impersonator and stand-up comic who was very apt at improvisation. His memorable characters include Pak Rahim in the comedy series Afi dan Abah and the puppet Kicap in the talk show Tom Tom Bak, both shown on Astro Ceria. He also frequently collaborated with Afdlin Shauki, having appearances in some of the latter's films such as Buli (2004) and Baik Punya Cilok (2005). Din ventured into radio broadcasting in 2008, pairing with Aznil Haji Nawawi on Riuh Pagi, the daily weekday breakfast show on radio station Era FM.

His stage name "Din Beramboi" was originally used for two fictional characters back in 1990: one created by himself and another created by cartoonist Ibrahim Anon for the magazine Ujang, which became a plagiarism controversy during the mid-1990s.

Din died on 2 April 2010, after suffering from haemorrhagic dengue fever. He was buried at the Taman Ehsan Muslim cemetery in Kepong.

== Biography ==
Din Beramboi was born as Mior Ahmad Fuad bin Mior Badri on 22 December 1966 to emigrant Perakian Malay parents from Gopeng, Perak named Mior Badri Mior Idris and his wife Rahmah Abdullah Sani in Sungai Besi, Kuala Lumpur (then the capital of undivided Selangor state; also concurrently the present national capital of Malaysia since independence) as the third of four siblings with three sisters and their only son. He received his early education in the Setapak suburb whereby he attended the Setapak National Elementary School and later finished his secondary education at the Setapak National Secondary School, in which he was schoolmates with fellow celebrity, Azwan Ali.

== Personal life ==
He was married to Suhaini Che Man for the past 20 years since 1990 until his death, with whom he had three children, two daughters and a son namely Nil Aina Adibah, Meor Shafiq Ar-Ridhwan and Nur Ain Syuhada.

== Illness and death ==
On 30 March 2010, Din was admitted to the Intensive Care Unit (ICU) of the Kuala Lumpur Hospital, complaining of an extreme fever. Early reports said he was diagnosed with deadly leptospirosis. The following day, he was diagnosed with dengue shock syndrome which caused failure of his liver and kidney. During the time he spent in the hospital, Din was visited by family members, friends and colleagues.

On 2 April 2010, Din died at the Selayang Hospital at 12:30 a.m., according to his brother-in-law, Sharifuddin Che Man who announced his death: "He (Din) began critical at 11.30 pm after he was given a first CPR until the last CPR at 12.15 in the midnight just now… until the doctor said Din couldn't be saved." Din's sister, Rozana Mior Badri, said that the life support machines installed since he was unconscious were stopped following the doctor's advice due to his internal organ failure.

He was then laid to rest at the Taman Ehsan Muslim Cemetery at 10:40 a.m.

== Filmography ==
=== Film ===
Year	Title	Roles	Notes
2005	Baik Punya Cilok	Fishing park owner	Cameo
2007	Sumolah	Sumo Referee I	Cameo
2008	Los dan Faun	Gardener / Derus	Cameo
2009	Sifu & Tongga	Boutique salesman	Cameo
2009	Papadom	JPJ officer	Cameo
2009	Duhai Si Pari-pari	Driver	Cameo
2012	Shh ... Dia Datang	Stall customer 1	Cameo and posthumous release

=== Television series ===
Year	Title	Role	TV channel
2006	Afi dan Abah	Pak Rahim	Astro Ceria

=== Telemovie ===
Year	Title	Role	TV channel
2004	Kelibat	Pawang	VCD

=== Television ===
Year	Title	TV channel	Notes
2004	Ah-Ha	TV3	
2005	Imsomnia		
2008	Wakenabeb! (Season 2)	NTV7	
2008	Actorlympics TV	NTV7	
2008	Jom Ronda bersama Proton	TV3	
2009	Spontan	Astro Warna	
2009	Mandi	Astro Warna	
2009	Lu Pikirlah Sendiri Nabil (Season 1)	Astro Prima	
2009	Jangan Lupa Lirik	Astro Ria	
2010	Lu Pikirlah Sendiri Nabil (Season 2)	Astro Prima	
2010	Raja Lawak Astro (Season 4)	Astro Prima	
2010	Wuhai Beramboi	Astro Warna	His last television appearance

== Radio career ==
=== Radio ===
Year	Title	Station
5 January 2009 – 2 April 2010	Riuh Pagi Era	Era

== Discography ==
=== Album ===
Year	Album	Genre	Label
1992	Seloka Cinta	Rock	Cherry Records
2000	Sawancara Din Dan Aznil	Komedi	Pony Canyon
2002	Din Beramboi Cari Makan	Komedi	Broadway
