= Sharifah Sofia =

Malaysian actress

- Born: Sharifah Sofia binti Syed Hussein; 28 July 1985 (age 40); Liverpool, England
- Occupation: Actress
- Years active: 2001–present
- Spouse: Syed Ismail Syed Ibrahim (m. 2009; div. 2019)
- Relatives: Syed Adney (brother)

Sharifah Sofia binti Syed Hussein (born 28 July 1985), better known by her popular name Sharifah Sofia, is a Malaysian actress.

== Early life ==
Sofia was born in Liverpool, England, the third child out of four siblings. She is the elder sister of footballer Syed Adney. She grew up in Liverpool until she was 9 years old. She has mixed parentage, her father is Malaysian and mother Scottish. She graduated in 2008 from Sunway University College where she was seeking a degree in performing arts.

== Filmography ==
=== Film ===
- Gong (2006)
- Cinta Yang Satu (2007)
- Orang Minyak (2007)
- Pisau Cukur (2009)
- Berani Punya Budak (2012)

=== Drama ===
- Gol & Gincu The Series as season 2 episode 8 guess artist (2007)
- Nur Kasih (2009)

=== Theatre ===
- Cupid Kills

== Awards and nominations ==
- 19th Malaysian Film Festival - Best Supporting Actress (nominated)
