= The Arsonist =

The Arsonist may refer to:

- The Arsonist (film), a 1995 Malaysian drama film by U-Wei Haji Saari
- The Arsonist (Deadlock album), or the title song
- The Arsonist (Sodom album)
- The Arsonist (book), a 2018 non-fiction book by Chloe Hooper
- "The Arsonist", a song by Puscifer from Money Shot
- Randy Cooper or the Arsonist, guitarist

== See also ==
- Arsonists (disambiguation)
