= Harun Salim Bachik =

Malaysian actor and comedian (1959–2015)

- هارون سليم بشيك
- Born: Haron Aminar Rashid bin Salim; 19 May 1959; Singapore
- Died: 8 March 2015 (aged 55); Perak, Malaysia
- Resting place: Taman Ar Raudhatul Sakinah Muslim Cemetery, Kuala Lumpur
- Occupations: Actor, comedian, singer, director, producer, host
- Years active: 1988–2015
- Children: 3 (including Danial Al Rashid)
- Musical career
- Genres: Pop

Haron Aminar Rashid bin Salim, popularly known as Harun Salim Bachik, (19 May 1959 – 8 March 2015) was a Malaysian actor and comedian. He was the father of Danial Al Rashid Haron Aminar Rashid, a politician and Member of the Selangor State Legislative Assembly (MLA) for Batu Tiga.

== Career ==
Born in Singapore, Harun was the son of a veteran actor of the 50s era, Salim Bachik.

Harun became known through his acting in the drama series titled Rumah Kedai, which aired on TV3 from 1988 to 1993. In 2001, he stunned Malaysia's acting industry after winning Best Male TV Actor at the seventh Anugerah Skrin for his serious role in the drama Hangatnya Salju Dinginnya Bara.

Harun was also involved in the sitcom series Gado-Gado, which aired on TV1. It became a real stepping stone for him in the world of acting.

Apart from acting, Harun was also a singer. He once produced an album in 1996 entitled Belilah. The most popular song on the album is Banjir.

Through the film Baik Punya Cilok (2005), he was nominated as the Best Supporting Actor at the Malaysia Film Festival. Through the film KIL (2013), he was nominated for a similar award at the Screen Awards 2013.

== Politics ==
He and Afdlin Shauki joined UMNO in 2012.

== Filmography ==
=== Film ===
| Year | Title | Role | Notes |
|---|---|---|---|
| 2003 | Mr. Cinderella 2 | Kudin | Debut film |
| 2005 | Baik Punya Cilok | Leman | |
| 2006 | Man Laksa | Saedon Dengki | |
| 2007 | Cinta Yang Satu | Hashim | |
| 2008 | Cuci | Janitor | |
| 2008 | Apa Kata Hati? | Hamidi | |
| 2008 | Antoofighter: Amukan Drakulat! | Pak Din | |
| 2009 | Setem | Marcello | |
| 2009 | Duhai Si Pari-Pari | Para | |
| 2009 | Papadom | Hussin | |
| 2009 | My Spy | Salleh | |
| 2010 | Lu Pikirlah Sendiri de Movie | Tauke pasar borong | |
| 2010 | Kapoww! | Astromen Belalang | |
| 2011 | Tolong Awek Aku Pontianak | Pak Harun | |
| 2011 | Aku Bukan Tomboy | Rahim | |
| 2012 | Cinta Kura Kura | Nazri | |
| 2012 | Hoore! Hoore! | Hairil | |
| 2012 | Jalan Kembali: Bohsia 2 | Bomoh | |
| 2012 | Aku, Kau & Dia | Dato' Hisham | |
| 2012 | SAM: Saya Amat Mencintaimu | Bos | |
| 2012 | Pontianak vs Orang Minyak | Lembaga Hitam | |
| 2013 | Lawak Ke Der? 2 | Himself | |
| 2013 | Bola Kampung: The Movie | Tok Ayah (voice) | |
| 2013 | Bikers Kental | Aidil Al-Zaifa | |
| 2013 | KIL | Mr. Harun | |
| 2013 | Lemak Kampung Santan | Pak Wan | |
| 2013 | Hantu Tok Mudim | Tok Mudim | |
| 2013 | Ular | Pak Mus | |
| 2014 | Abang Long Fadil | Pak Harun | |
| 2014 | Mat Tudung | Datuk Meor | |
| 2014 | Jin | Ejen rumah | |
| 2014 | Lelaki Harapan Dunia | Megat | |
| 2015 | Gangsterock Kasi Sengat | Zuan | |
| 2015 | Jejak Warriors | Pak Jai | |
| 2015 | Polis Evo | ASP Mokhtar Zain | Last film |

=== Television series ===
| Year | Title | Role | Notes |
|---|---|---|---|
| 1988–1995 | Rumah Kedai | Remy | |
| 1990–1991 | Gado-Gado | | Sitcom |
| 2007 | Susuk (Season 2) | Tok Batin Gayong | |
| 2009 | Lily Marlin | Ajib | Also as director |
| 2012–2013 | Oh My English! | Encik Mohd Salleh | |
| 2015–2016 | Cinta Dari Marikh | Tuan Jefri | |

=== Telemovie ===
| Year | Title | Role | Notes |
|---|---|---|---|
| 1988 | Dedu-debu di Jalanan | | |
| 1992 | Yazan | | |
| 1993 | Cikgu Limau Kasturi | Cikgu Halim | |
| 1995 | Ketupat | | |
| 1996 | Namaku Yassin | Yassin / Yanto | |
| 2000 | Hangatnya Salju Dindingnya Bara | Nasir | |
| 2002 | Pelawak Giler | | |
| 2003 | Orang Kasar | — | Also as director and executive producer |
| 2003 | Leman Nak Pergi Jerman | Leman | |
| 2003 | Kondo Madu | Budin | |
| 2008 | Ana Nak Susu | | |
| 2011 | Man Pos Masuk Kampung | Pak Husin | |
| 2012 | Perempuan Tanpa Rahim | Malim | |
| 2012 | Duit Kau Duit Aku | Sabri | |
| 2013 | Haron Ron Ron | Haron | |
| 2013 | Kain, Jarum & Gunting | | Last telemovie |

=== Television ===
| Year | Title | Role |
|---|---|---|
| 2009–2010 | Redah Kasi Pecah | Host |
| 2011 | Maharaja Lawak Mega | |
| 2011 | S.Y.O.K | |
| 2012 | Maharaja Lawak Mega 2012 | |
| 2012–2013 | Super Spontan | Jury |
| 2013 | Maharaja Lawak Mega 2013 | |
| 2013–2014 | Bintang Mencari Bintang | |

== Discography ==
=== Studio album ===
- Belilah (1996)
