= KIL (film) =

- Theatrical release poster
- Directed by: Nik Amir Mustapha
- Written by: Nik Amir Mustapha; Rewan Ishak; Khairulzaman Dzulkifly
- Screenplay by: Nik Amir Mustapha
- Produced by: Rewan Ishak; Nik Amir Mustapha; Jeremy Little; Anizan Sarif; Tengku Iesta Tengku Alaudin
- Starring: Redza Minhat; Cristina Suzanne; Harun Salim Bachik; Juliana Evans; Hasnul Rahmat; Anne James; Dira Abu Zahar
- Cinematography: S. Y. Chong
- Edited by: Rewan Ishak
- Music by: Saiful Ridzuan
- Production companies: Grand Brilliance; Flux Visual Lab
- Distributed by: Primeworks Studios
- Release date: 30 May 2013 (Malaysia)
- Running time: 90 minutes
- Country: Malaysia
- Languages: Malay; English
- Budget: MYR 150,000
- Box office: MYR 510,000

KIL is a 2013 Malaysian Malay-language mystery drama film directed by Nik Amir Mustapha and It was written by Nik Amir Mustapha, Rewan Ishak and Khairulzaman Dzulkifly and produced by Tengku Iesta Tengku Alaudin.

The film's title, a play on the word "kill" and "Akil", the latter being the name of the main protagonist – a quiet and depressed young man who sees suicide as his only solution. After several suicide attempts, Akil hires an agency known as Life Action Bureau (LAB), to help him commit suicide. When the date of his death draws near, he falls in love with a girl he met, Zara. This interaction however causes him to begin having second thoughts about death.

The film stars Redza Minhat and Cristina Suzanne. The film had a public release on 30 May 2013.

The film won four awards from seven nominations at the Anugerah Skrin 2013 (including Best Film) and topped the 26th Malaysian Film Festival with five wins out of eleven nominations (including Best Picture).

== Plot ==
A young, depressed man named Akil (Redza Minhat) wants to commit suicide. However, he always fails in each attempt. When attempting to jump from the building, he manages to prevent a teenager (Juliana Evans) from committing suicide because of a break-up.

One day, he comes across a flyer advertising suicide services. Akil calls the number and speaks with Salina (Dira Abu Zahar), learning about an agency called the Life Action Bureau (LAB). After a consultation with LAB representative Mr. Harun (Harun Salim Bachik), Akil hires the agency to end his life in an unspecified manner. He is unaware of who the LAB contractors (assassins) are, or when and where the execution will occur.

Akil resumes his normal life until he begins to fall in love with a girl he meets, Zara (Cristina Suzanne). Akil frequently meets with Zara before he realises he was being followed by a LAB contractor. Akil then gets his first bonus (after four years of work) from his boss. Akil brings Zara to watch a movie titled World Without Tomorrow, directed by Johan Iskandar (Hasnul Rahmat). Johan is one of LAB's customers due to his failed marriage with his wife (Atilia Haron).

As the day passes, Akil receives photos of his everyday life with little notes on them encouraging him to continue living. Akil becomes happier with his life. Zara is later revealed as the LAB contractor for Johan. The next day, Akil is kidnapped and gets photographed before being released by his captors. Akil then arrives home and finds his house ransacked. Frustrated, Akil calls LAB officials to cancel his contract. After Mr. Harun says the cancellation is impossible, Akil tries to make a police report but struggles to explain the situation to the police.

Akil then returns to his hometown village to meet with his Aunt Rose. His mother had been killed in an accident due to Akil's mistake. Zara is revealed to have received kidneys from Raj, the son of Miss Jasmine (Anna James). After returning from the village, Akil comes across a collection of photos of Zara's victims.

After that, Akil meets with Zara. Zara tells him that she is working with LAB but denies she is a killer. They argue for a moment before Akil tells Zara to kill him straight away. Zara slaps Akil and reminds him that she still cares about him. Upon returning home, Akil meets with the LAB contractor assigned to kill him (Mr. Harun). Akil says he wants his life back before Mr. Harun shoots him.

Zara tries to find information on Akil's case in the LAB data library but it is too late to prevent Mr. Harun from executing the contract.

In the epilogue, the pistol is revealed to be a toy gun. LAB is not a killing agency but is a NGO that aims to prevent suicide. Knowing that he or she would be killed, one would better appreciate life. Mr. Harun says that Zara is a LAB contractor but is not working for him. The film ends with Zara giving a treat to Akil for being able to guess her exact job.

== Cast ==
- Redza Minhat as Akil
- Cristina Suzanne as Zara
- Harun Salim Bachik as Mr. Harun
- Juliana Evans as Suicide Girl
- Hasnul Rahmat as Johan Iskandar
- Anne James as Miss Jasmine
- Dira Abu Zahar as Salina
- Atilia Haron as Johan wife
- Ella as Neighbour

== Accolades ==
Awards	Category	Name	Result
Porto Alegre Fantasy International Film Festival 2014	Panorama	Tengku Iesta Tengku Alaudin	Nominated
Southeast Asia Film Festival 2014		Tengku Iesta Tengku Alaudin	Nominated
Marché du Film 2013		Tengku Iesta Tengku Alaudin	Nominated
Luang Prabang Film Festival 2013		Tengku Iesta Tengku Alaudin	Nominated
Osaka Asian Film Festival 2014	Grand Prix	Tengku Iesta Tengku Alaudin	Nominated
Dhaka International Film Festival 2014	Australasian Film Competition	Tengku Iesta Tengku Alaudin	Nominated
Anugerah Skrin 2013	Best Film	Tengku Iesta Tengku Alaudin	Won
Anugerah Skrin 2013	Best Screenplay	Nik Amir Mustapha	Won
Anugerah Skrin 2013	Best Director	Nik Amir Mustapha	Won
Anugerah Skrin 2013	Best Actress	Cristina Suzanne.	Won
Anugerah Skrin 2013	Best Actor	Redza Minhat.	Nominated
Anugerah Skrin 2013	Best Supporting Actress	Anne James.	Nominated
Anugerah Skrin 2013	Best Supporting Actor	Harun Salim Bachik	Nominated
26th Malaysian Film Festival	Best Film	Tengku Iesta Tengku Alaudin	Won
26th Malaysian Film Festival	Best Poster	Tengku Iesta Tengku Alaudin	Won
26th Malaysian Film Festival	Best Screenplay	Nik Amir Mustapha	Won
26th Malaysian Film Festival	Best Director	Nik Amir Mustapha	Won
26th Malaysian Film Festival	Best Future Director	Nik Amir Mustapha	Nominated
26th Malaysian Film Festival	Best Future Actress	Cristina Suzanne	Won
26th Malaysian Film Festival	Best Supporting Actress	Anne James	Nominated
26th Malaysian Film Festival	Best Art Editing	Rewan Ishak	Nominated
26th Malaysian Film Festival	Best Editing	Rewan Ishak	Nominated
26th Malaysian Film Festival	Best Cinematography	S.Y. Chong	Nominated
26th Malaysian Film Festival	Best Sound Editing	Mohsin Othman	Nominated
Kuala Lumpur Film Critics' Award 2013	Best Film	Tengku Iesta Tengku Alaudin	Nominated
Kuala Lumpur Film Critics' Award 2013	Best Screenplay	Nik Amir Mustapha	Nominated
Kuala Lumpur Film Critics' Award 2013	Best Director	Nik Amir Mustapha	Nominated
Kuala Lumpur Film Critics' Award 2013	Best Actor	Redza Minhat.	Nominated
Kuala Lumpur Film Critics' Award 2013	Best Supporting Actress	Anne James.	Won
Kuala Lumpur Film Critics' Award 2013	Best Cinematography	S.Y. Chong	Won
Shout! Awards 2013	Breakthrough Local Feature	Tengku Iesta Tengku Alaudin	Won
Shout! Awards 2013	Best On-Screen Chemistry	Redza Minhat & Cristina Suzanne	Nominated
Shout! Awards 2013	Hot Guy	Redza Minhat	Nominated
Shout! Awards 2013	Hot Chick	Cristina Suzanne	Nominated
ASEAN International Film Festival 2015	Best Actor	Redza Minhat	Nominated
ASEAN International Film Festival 2015	Best Screenplay	Nik Amir Mustapha	Nominated
