= Papadom (film) =

- Theatrical release poster
- Directed by: Afdlin Shauki
- Written by: Afdlin Shauki
- Produced by: Gayatri Su-Lin Pillai
- Starring: Afdlin Shauki; Liyana Jasmay; Noorkhiriah; Vanidah Imran; Farid Kamil
- Cinematography: Helmi Yusof
- Edited by: Mindy Wong Vern Yee
- Music by: Pacai
- Production company: Tayangan Unggul
- Release date: 8 October 2009
- Running time: 115 minutes
- Country: Malaysia
- Language: Malay
- Budget: MYR 1.44 Million
- Box office: MYR 3.20 million

Papadom (transl. Papadam) is a 2009 Malaysian Malay-language comedy-drama film that is inspired by Disney’s College Road Trip (2008). It was directed by Afdlin Shauki, who stars in the film. It also stars Liyana Jasmay, Noorkhiriah, and Vanidah Imran.

== Cast ==
- Afdlin Shauki as Saadom, runs a nasi kandar stall with his wife Munirah, still does so after the latter's death
- Noorkhiriah as Munirah, Saadom's late wife, Miasara's late mother
- Liyana Jasmay - Miasara, Saadom's daughter
- Vanidah Imran as Professor Balqis
- Farid Kamil as Hisham, plays rugby for the university team
- Scha Alyahya as Shasha, Miasara's rival
- Chelsia Ng as Yvonne, Miasara's best friend since school
- Que Haidar as Mat, Miasara's shy classmate and aspiring film maker
- Harun Salim Bachik as Shukor, Saadom's employer in the university premises
- Adham Malekh as Ali, one of Saadom's business partners.
- Pete Teo as Uncle Lim, one of Saadom's business partners.
- Din Beramboi as JPJ officer
- Maimon Mutalib as head teacher
- Henzi Andalas as Teacher Midon
- Mamat Khalid as Dato' Mamat Khalid

== Awards and nominations ==
Award	Category	Recipient	Result
22nd Malaysia Film Festival	Best Art Direction	Nazrul Asraff	Nominated
22nd Malaysia Film Festival	Best Original Music Score	Pacai	Won
22nd Malaysia Film Festival	Best Original Story	Afdlin Shauki	Won
22nd Malaysia Film Festival	Best Screenplay	Afdlin Shauki	Nominated
22nd Malaysia Film Festival	Best Actress in a Supporting Role	Noorkhiriah	Nominated
22nd Malaysia Film Festival	Best Actor in a Supporting Role	Que Haidar	Nominated
22nd Malaysia Film Festival	Best Actress	Liyana Jasmay	Won
22nd Malaysia Film Festival	Best Actor	Afdlin Shauki	Won
22nd Malaysia Film Festival	Best Film Director	Afdlin Shauki	Nominated
22nd Malaysia Film Festival	Best Film	Papadom	Won

== Other versions ==
The film was also remade in the Tamil language in 2011 as Appalam, also directed by Afdlin Shauki.

== See also ==
- Papadam, the namesake Indian food
