= Khaidirah Abu Zahar =

Malaysian actor, director and politician

Yang Berhormat Datuk Khaidirah Abu Zahar DPSM MLA
- خضيرة أبو ظهر

Deputy Member of the Malacca State Executive Council (Economic Planning, Finance, Land Affairs, Non-governmental Agencies, Investment, Industry, Technical, Vocational Education and Training (TVET) Development)
- In office 6 April 2023 – 14 November 2026
- Governor: Mohd Ali Rustam
- Chief Minister: Ab Rauf Yusoh
- Member: Ab Rauf Yusoh
- Constituency: Rim

Deputy Speaker of the Malacca State Legislative Assembly
- In office 27 December 2021 – 6 April 2023
- Governor: Mohd Ali Rustam
- Chief Minister: Sulaiman Md Ali (2021–2023); Ab Rauf Yusoh (March–April 2023)
- Speaker: Ibrahim Durum
- Preceded by: Ghazale Muhamad
- Succeeded by: Kerk Chee Yee
- Constituency: Rim

Member of the Melaka State Legislative Assembly for Rim
- Incumbent
- Assumed office 20 November 2021
- Preceded by: Ghazale Muhamad (BN–UMNO)
- Majority: 1,327 (2021); 7,090 (2026)

Faction represented in Melaka State Legislative Assembly
- 2021–: Barisan Nasional

Personal details
- Born: Khaidhirah binti Abu Zahar; 2 March 1984 (age 42) Merlimau, Malacca, Malaysia
- Party: United Malays National Organisation (UMNO)
- Other political affiliations: Barisan Nasional (BN)
- Spouses: Tengku Shafriz-Rullah Tengku Shahid (m. 2006; div. 2010) Helmi Yusof (m. 2011; div. 2016) Syfik Izdzywan Sidek (m. 2020)
- Relations: Abu Zahar Ithnin (father)
- Children: 1 daughter & 1 adopted son
- Education: Universiti Teknologi MARA (LLB); University of Malaya (MPP)
- Occupation: Actress; director; politician; host
- Nickname: Dira

Khaidhirah Abu Zahar (born 2 March 1984) is a Malaysian politician, host, director and former actress who has served as Deputy Member of the Malacca State Executive Council (EXCO) in the Barisan Nasional (BN) state administration under Chief Minister and Member Ab Rauf Yusoh since April 2023 and Member of the Malacca State Legislative Assembly (MLA) for Rim since November 2021. She served as Deputy Speaker of the Malacca State Legislative Assembly from December 2021 to her appointment as a Deputy EXCO Member in April 2023. She is a member and the Division Vice Chief of Jasin of the United Malays National Organisation (UMNO), a component party of the ruling Barisan Nasional (BN) coalition. She is also popularly known by her screen name namely Dira.

She is the first actress to be elected as an elected representative after her win in the 2021 Malacca state election, overall the second celebrity to become a representative after the late former Senator Jins Shamsuddin.

== Early life ==
She was born on 2 March 1984 in Merlimau, Malacca, the daughter of the former eighth Chief Minister of Malacca, the late Abu Zahar Ithnin. Dira holds a Bachelor of Laws degree from Universiti Teknologi MARA (UiTM) Shah Alam.She later continue her studies in master degree in public policy from University of Malaya

== Entertainment career ==
Dira has been a host on the television shows Fulus Mania, Jom Ronda with Proton and Melodi. Among the dramas she has acted in include Delima, Cinta Tanpa Suara, Rona Roni Makaroni, Merah Putih, One Hundred Birthdays, Tower 13, Aki Nabalu, Arjuna, Woman, Two Kali Mencintai Mu, Crossings and Aku Bukan Dia. She once starred in the movie My Indie Rock Darling.

Dira was also involved in the theatrical performances of Compilation Vol II (Legacy) and Signs. She is also involved in writing scripts such as for the drama film Syawal Aku Dan Dia on TV Alhijrah. Dira once participated in Sehati Berdansa, a dance reality show published by Astro

She has starred in several films such as For 3 Days, Chow Kit, Kil, The Run (also known as Lari), and Longkai. Dira co -starred with Aiman Hakim Ridza and Emma Maembong in the film Kimchi Untuk Awak directed by Michael Ang, which premiered in March 2017.

Dira took the director's chair by directing the theatrical staging of Mencari Sumaiyah which began its staging at Istana Budaya, Kuala Lumpur from 8 to 14 August 2016.

She also directed sitcom dramas for Astro Warna, 3 Dara Kg.com starring Scha Al-Yahya, Marsha Londoh and Eina Azman.

== Political career ==
Following in the footsteps of her father, the eighth former Chief Minister of Melaka, Datuk Seri Abu Zahar Haji Ithnin on Monday ventured into politics, Dira joined Puteri UMNO by serving as Exco from 2015 to 2018. Her appointment was made during the UMNO wing meeting at Menara Dato 'Onn chaired by the Chief Puteri, Datuk Mas Ermieyati Samsudin who is also the Deputy Minister of Tourism and Culture. Also present, her Deputy, Zahida Zarik Khan; Puteri's Assistant Secretary, Fahariyah Md Nordin and the EXCO line -up

On 24 August 2013, Dira submitted the Puteri UMNO membership form to the state UMNO Liaison Committee Chairman, Datuk Idris Haron. She was quoted from Utusan Malaysia as saying: "I want to do many things for the party because I see how my mother and father struggle in the party and for their spirit I feel called to join Puteri".

Dira revealed to Utusan Malaysia in June 2018 that she made an official statement regarding speculation that she was contesting for the post of UMNO Puteri Chief. In an interview with Sinar Harian, Dira stated that she remained loyal to UMNO, saying that what she was doing now was business and politics and no longer acting. Dira was announced as the Jasin Division UMNO Puteri Chief at the movement's delegate meeting. She won unopposed for the post for the 2018-2021 term.

Dira was one of the new faces picked by the party as the BN candidate to contest the 2021 Malacca state election for the Rim seat. She became the first artiste to successfully win an election to be a lawmaker. On 27 December 2021, she was appointed as Deputy Speaker of the Melaka State Legislative Assembly along with new Speaker Ibrahim Durum by Chief Minister Sulaiman Md Ali.

== Personal life ==
Dira has been married three times. She was married to musician Tengku Shafiz-Rullah Tengku Mohd Shahid (now married to Sherie Merlis) in 2006, and separated in 2010. They have a daughter named Tengku Anggun Deandra Tengku Shafiz-Rullah. Dira married the cameraman and director, Helmi Yusof on November 14, 2011, and had a miscarriage in December 2013. The couple filed for divorce in 2016.

She has an adopted child named Waris Iskandar Andiqa after getting an application from the government.

Dira married for the third time with businessman Syfik Izdzywan Sidek on 21 June 2020 at the Al Azim Mosque, Melaka, at 10.30 am. During the ceremony, Dira received a dowry of RM1,000 along with three delivery trays for five.

She has a hobby of riding high-powered motorcycles.

== Controversy ==
In April 2012, Dira became the subject of controversy when she was allegedly involved in a fight case and was accused of having caused grievous bodily harm to a woman following a slight misunderstanding. She lodged a police report on the incident, but denied involvement in the incident. As a result, she was rested as the host of Melodi and was not even allowed to attend the promotion of her film Chow Kit.

== Filmography ==
=== Film ===
Year	Title	Role	Notes
2007	My Indie Rock Darling	Young Lady	Debut film appearances
2012	Chow Kit	Salina	
2012	Untuk 3 Hari	Balqis	
2012	Ngorat	Aishah	
2012	Pontianak vs Orang Minyak	Vampire Advisor 1	
2013	KIL	Salina	
2013	Lari	Maya	
2013	Longkai	Rima	
2013	Kolumpo	Kuih Sister	Special appearance
2013	Papadom 2	Sheila	
2014	Sejoli: Misi Cantas Cinta	Lola	
2014	Mana Mau Lari	Gadis Jelita	Special appearance
2016	Bo-Peng	Hana	Special appearance
2017	Kimchi Untuk Awak	Kak Long	
2017	Kau Takdirku	Awek Dating 1	Special appearance
2023	Sayu Yang Syukur	Sherry	Special appearance

=== Drama ===
Year	Title	Role	TV channels	Notes
2008	Rona Roni Makaroni	Gia	Astro Ria	
2008	Kekasihku Seru	Masita	TV3	
2009	Merah Putih	Anggun	TV3	
2009	Tower 13	Maria	TV3	
2010	Arjuna	Mas Ayu	TV3	
2010	Crossings	Katie	NTV7	
2011	Tahajjud Cinta	Umairah	TV3	
2011–2012	Nilapura	Widya	TV3	
2012	Tanah Kubur (Season 4)	Yati	Astro Oasis	Episode: "Pengkid"
2012–2013	Cinta Dalam Hati	Munira	TV2	
2013	Dahlia	Dahlia	Astro Mustika HD	
2015	Aku Bukan Dia	Amy	TV1	
2017	3 Dara Kg.com	—	Astro Warna	As director

=== Theater ===
Year	Title
2015	Baik Punya Cilok

=== Telemovie ===
Year	Title	Role	TV channels	Notes
2009	Ponti Anak Remaja		Astro Ria	
2009	Seratus Hari Jadi	Sara	Astro Ria	
2011	Perempuan		TV2	
2012	50:50		TV1	
2012	Kau Untukku	Nurul Umairah	Astro Box Office	
2013	Karlos Bolos	Cuwie	TV3	
2013	Pasport Duniawi		TV Alhijrah	
2013	Beranak Dalam Kubur	Salmah	Astro Prima	
2014	Nangnok	Nang	Astro Ria	
2015	Cinta Suci Jadi Saksi		Astro Ria	
2016	Redha Untukmu	—	TV1	As director

=== Television ===
Year	Title	Role	TV channels
2007	Mango TV	Host	
2008	Jom Ronda bersama Proton	Host with AG	TV3
2010–2012	Melodi	Host with Zizan Razak	TV3

== Election results ==
Malacca State Legislative Assembly
Year	Constituency	Candidate	Votes	Pct	Opponent(s)	Votes	Pct	Ballots cast	Majority	Turnout
2021	N25 Rim	Khaidiriah Abu Zahar (UMNO)	4,037	45.31%	Azalina Abdul Rahman (BERSATU)	2,710	30.42%	9,082	1,327	66.43%
2021	N25 Rim	Khaidiriah Abu Zahar (UMNO)	4,037	45.31%	Prasanth Kumar Brakasam (PKR)	2,163	24.28%	9,082	1,327	66.43%
2026	N25 Rim	Khaidiriah Abu Zahar (UMNO)	9,847	78.13%	Esma Eazreen Husin (PKR)	2,757	21.87%	12,604	7,090	71.76%

== Honours ==
=== Honours of Malaysia ===
- Malacca
  - Lieutenant of the Exalted Order of Malacca (DPSM) – Datuk (2020)
