= Motif (film) =

2019 Malaysian crime drama film

- Directed by: Nadiah Hamzah
- Starring: Sharifah Amani; Rosyam Nor; Iedil Dzuhrie Alaudin; Taqim Zaki
- Production companies: WayangWorks; Ore Struck Media
- Distributed by: Empire Film Solution
- Release date: 26 September 2019 (Malaysia)
- Running time: 85 minutes
- Country: Malaysia
- Language: Malay language

Motif (English: Motive) is a 2019 Malaysian Malay-language crime drama film directed by Nadiah Hamzah starring Sharifah Amani, Rosyam Nor, Iedil Dzuhrie Alaudin and Taqim Zaki. This films revolves a female police investigator, Dewi (Sharifah Amani) have to solve the case, about a missing girl in a small town is suddenly murdered, while the prime suspect might be the girl's father (Rosyam Nor).

It is released on 26 September 2019 in Malaysia.

== Synopsis ==
Inspector Dewi (Sharifah Armani) is an intelligent female inspector who is assigned to investigate the case of missing teen girl, Anna in the town of Tanah Merah. Anna was last seen in an old hotel. She is assigned with the local Inspector Rizal (Taqim Zaki). However, she is not welcomed by the town, especially by the father of the missing girl, Hussein (Rosyam Nor) who is a powerful figure in the town and has prejudices towards women. Meanwhile, Dewi also struggles with her personal life as she is in a polygamous relationship. When Anna is discovered murdered, everyone around Anna becomes suspect. Can Dewi solve the slow-burn murder case?

== Cast ==
- Sharifah Amani as Inspector Dewi
- Rosyam Nor as Hussein, Anna’s father
- Iedil Dzuhrie Alaudin as Faisal
- Taqim Zaki as Inspector Rizal
- Emma Tosh as Yasmin
- Khalid Salleh as Yasmin’s father
- Nadia Aqilah as Lena (voice)
- Izze Azzam as Konstabel Hanif
- Sherie Merlis as Suri, Anna’s mother
- Khayrani Kemal as Anna Hussein
- Sharmin Edora as Anis Hussein
- Fadhli Masoot as Azlan
- Azhan Rani as Kamal
- Kenji Sawahi as ASP Zamri
- Azman Hassan as Syukur
- Ho Yuhang as Lim
- Sakonlawat Khetboon as Surin
- Lee Ming as Ming
- Redza Minhat as IIham (voice)
- Khairunazwan Rodzy as Bakar
- Ken Zuraida as Yasmin’s mother
- Muslim as Konstabel Ihsan
