= Hanyut =

- Film poster
- Directed by: U-Wei Haji Saari
- Screenplay by: U-Wei Haji Saari
- Based on: Almayer's Folly by Joseph Conrad
- Produced by: Julia Fraser
- Starring: Peter O'Brien; Diana Danielle; Sofia Jane; Adi Putra
- Cinematography: Arkadiusz Tomiak
- Edited by: Kate James
- Production company: Tanah Licin Sdn Bhd
- Release dates: 6 November 2014 (Indonesia); 24 November 2016 (Malaysia)
- Country: Malaysia
- Languages: Malay; English
- Budget: RM 18 million (estimated)

Hanyut (Drifting) is a Malaysian adventure drama film written and directed by U-Wei Haji Saari based upon Joseph Conrad's 1895 novel, Almayer's Folly.

The movie tells the story of Almayer, a Dutch trader struggling to survive in Malaya at the turn of the 19th century. Almayer's dream of finding a mythical gold mountain is at odds with his plotting wife, colonial authorities, the political machinations of a local chief with Arab traders, and his daughter's love for a freedom-fighting Malay prince.

The film was originally planned to be released after its completion in 2012. However, the release was postponed since December 2013 due to lack of promotional funding, in which director U-Wei had to request for RM 2 million from National Film Development Corporation Malaysia for marketing and local distribution purposes. It managed to get selected screenings in 150 cinemas across Indonesia in November 2014 under the name of Gunung Emas Almayer (Almayer's Golden Mountain). The film was eventually released in Malaysian cinemas on 24 November 2016, as told through a press conference on 13 October of the same year.

== Plot ==
Almayer is a lone Dutch trader grubbing to survive in colonial Malaysia. He sends his 10-year-old daughter Nina to Singapore to be educated as a Westerner, much to the distress of her mother Mem, a local woman of Betawi origin. The couple stop speaking to each other as a result. When Nina returns as a beautiful woman ten years later, she finds the family home and business in dire straits because of Almayer's obsession with finding gold in the mountains. Her return rekindles interest in the Almayer household, bringing in new business that allows Almayer to build a lavish new house in his compound.

Nina's presence attracts a number of suitors, including the nephew of a prominent Arab who asks for Nina's hand in marriage. Almayer rejects the proposal, however, igniting an animosity between the traders that helps lead to Almayer's later downfall. Almayer guards Nina jealously as he sees her as an important part of his unrealistic dreams. He believes her beauty, combined with the gold he expects to unearth, will help him build a trading empire and fulfill his fantasy of a glorious future back in Europe, a world he has never seen.

A handsome Malay prince and trader named Dain Maroola enters the scene. Dain wants to buy gunpowder through Almayer. Almayer doesn't question why the man wants explosives. Dain manipulates him with tales of the legendary gold mountain of which he claims to know the location.

As Almayer's trading post prospers, he believes he is in reach of his dreams and readies boats and equipment for his gold-seeking expedition. In his fanaticism, he doesn't notice Dain and Nina fall in love. Mother Mem knows Almayer won't tolerate such a union. Given the deep animosity she feels toward her husband, she fuels and encourages the relationship while keeping Almayer in the dark.

Dain turns out to be a Malay freedom fighter who uses the purchased gunpowder to blow up a Dutch vessel at the mouth of the river. Now an outlaw, the British and Dutch military hunt along the river. When Dain's men are attacked by colonial forces during a violent tropical storm, Dain is believed killed. Almayer fears he has lost his chances to find gold and goes on an alcohol-fuelled binge. He doesn't know that Dain faked his own death and eloped with Nina. When he learns the truth from Mem, Almayer heads off in pursuit of the couple up river, determined that his daughter will not leave for a Malay.

When Almayer finds the couple, he is unable to convince his daughter to return. Heartbroken, he helps them escape and returns to his new house, which he burns down. Alienated and distraught, he is left with only his shattered dreams and the burned ruins of "Almayer's Folly".

== Cast ==
- Peter O'Brien as Kasper Almayer
- Diana Danielle as Nina
- Sofia Jane as Mem
- Adi Putra as Dain Maroola
- Khalid Salleh as Orang Kaya Tinggi
- Bront Palarae as Sayed Rashid
- Sabri Yunus as Mahmat
- James Corley as Lieutenant
- Alex Komang as Sayed Abdullah
- El Malik as Raja Ibrahim
- Rahayu Saraswati as Taminah
- Hasnul Rahmat as Ali
- Fergus Rees as sub Lieutenant
- Aida Ileani Ross as Little Nina
- Patrick Teoh as Jim Eng
- Normah Damanhuri as Perempuan
- Chris Haywood as Capt Ford
- Anwar Idris as Anjang
- Fairil Emran Desa as Pirate
- Hana Nadira as Lijah
- Lydia Ibtisam as Ina
- Geoff Andre Feyaerts as Soldier

== Production ==
The film was shot on location in Kuala Lipis and Pekan, Malaysia.

=== Director’s statement ===
Hanyut is a story about a cosmopolitan society living and working together along a riverbank somewhere in Malaysia. It attracted many sea travellers seeking opportunity and rewards.
It gives us a window into the Malay society in Malaysia in the late 19th century: A highly competitive mix of indigenous Malays, tribal aborigines, Europeans, Arabs, Indians and Chinese living and working together.
Although the book starts out as though it is from the perspective of the European protagonist, the narrative is dynamic. By the end of the story the protagonist (and the audience) discover the understanding of his own insignificance.
In the beginning of the story Almayer appears to be at the centre of society, but in the end we see that he is very much peripheral and alienated, and that the real cultural, political and economic life of the community is located elsewhere and involves other people besides himself.
