= Sumolah =

- Teaser poster
- Directed by: Afdlin Shauki
- Written by: Afdlin Shauki; Christina Orow; Michihiro Kubota; Tomoko Kubota
- Produced by: Afdlin Shauki
- Starring: Afdlin Shauki; Inthira Charoenpura; Gurmit Singh; Awie; Patrick Teoh
- Music by: Wizardworks Production
- Distributed by: Silver Omega; Vision Works
- Release date: 10 May 2007
- Country: Malaysia
- Languages: Malay; Japanese; English
- Budget: MYR 2.95 million ($913,735)
- Box office: MYR 1,194,000 ($369,830)

Sumolah (English: Let's Sumo!) is a 2007 Malaysian Malay-language action comedy film starring Afdlin Shauki and featuring the Japanese sport of sumo wrestling. The film was shot in Malaysia and Japan. The film has a multi-national cast including Thai actress Inthira Charoenpura who was previously known for her performance in Nang Nak, and Singaporean actor Gurmit Singh known for his performance in the sitcom Phua Chu Kang Pte Ltd. The plot of the film revolves about what would happen if an unambitious Malay mat rempit is forced to enter the challenging world of sumo. This film is rated PG13 for intense sumo violence, some drug content, sexual references and brief strong language. This film was a financial failure despite critical success.

== Plot ==
Ramlee (Afdlin Shauki) is a down and out Malay boy who cannot seem to hold down a job, much to his mother’s (Kartina Aziz) disappointment. Out of a job and out of money, he stumbles across a challenge by sushi restaurant owner Honda (Patrick Teoh) to “eat all you can for free food – within a time limit”. Hungry and desperate, Ramlee attempts the challenge, and fails. In compensation, Honda (Patrick Teoh) lets Ramlee take a job at the restaurant to pay off his due.

Ramlee becomes a member of the Boleh Sushi shop staff, along with Haris (Awie) and Andy (Radhi Khalid). Ramlee is immediately attracted to Honda’s beautiful daughter, Siti (Intira Jaroenpura), who is half-Japanese and half-Malay. He begins to learn the meaning of having good work, good friends and family.

One day he learns that part of his obligation is to take part in the Malaysian Sushi Association Amateur Sumo Wrestling Championships held by the local Japanese owners of sushi restaurants.

Whilst taking part in the initial friendly bout, Akira (Gurmit Singh), Siti’s ex-boyfriend, humiliates him in public. It is only after that that Ramlee finds out that he had been tricked into working for Boleh Sushi because Honda was desperate for a third member for their team.

Ramlee has to make a choice – whether to stay on and fight for Boleh Sushi in the upcoming Championships, or to give up on his new-found family. He decides to step up to the challenge and begins training with the boys for the big fight.

He learns the meaning of the word nokotta – never give up, the fight is not yet won. He learns that no matter what the result, the honour is in fighting the good fight. Ultimately, Ramlee’s challenge is to let go of the excuses he has made for himself, and to fight till the end, no matter what.

== Cast ==
- Afdlin Shauki as Ramlee
- Inthira Charoenpura as Siti
- Gurmit Singh as Akira
- Awie as Haris
- Patrick Teoh as Honda
- Radhi Khalid as Andy
- Gavin Yap as Mickey
- Terry Gallyot as Hassan
- Ben Tan as Tadano
- Mohd Afif as Kodok
- Kartina Aziz as Mak
- Din Beramboi as Sumo Referee I
- Chew Kin Wah as Sumo Referee II
- Yank Kassim as Sumo Player (not credited)
- Natasha Hudson as Celcom Salesperson (not credited)

== Awards ==
Year	Award	Category	Recipient/Nominated work(s)	Result
2007	20th Malaysia Film Festival	Best Director	Afdlin Shauki	Nominated
2007	20th Malaysia Film Festival	Best Actor	Afdlin Shauki	Nominated
2007	20th Malaysia Film Festival	Best Screenplay	Afdlin Shauki	Nominated
2007	20th Malaysia Film Festival	Best Editing	Faizul Mohd Noh	Nominated
2007	20th Malaysia Film Festival	Best Supporting Actor	Patrick Teoh	Nominated
2007	20th Malaysia Film Festival	Best Original Theme Song	Afdlin Shauki, Pacai	Nominated
2007	20th Malaysia Film Festival	Best Costume Designer	Shada	Nominated

== See also ==
- Rikishi
