= Redza Minhat =

Malaysian actor (born 1980)

- Born: Shahredza bin Minhat; 1 October 1980 (age 46); Ayer Tawar, Perak, Malaysia
- Education: Multimedia University
- Occupations: Screenwriter, actor, producer, model, investment analyst, banker
- Years active: 2003–present
- Known for: Pisau Cukur; KIL
- Spouse: Aidira Khaidir
- Children: 2

Shahredza Minhat (born 1 October 1980) is a Malaysian actor, screenwriter. producer, model, investment analyst and banker. He has received multiple nominations at the Malaysia Film Festival and the Anugerah Skrin. He debuted in the film Pisau Cukur, which brought him widespread recognition.

Although he works as an investment analyst at a local financial institution, he still acts whenever he has spare time. Additionally, he serves as a staff writer and finance director at Playground Productions. Redza also serve as deputy director at Bank Negara Malaysia since June 2026.

He frequently collaborates with director Nik Amir Mustapha.

== Career ==
=== Acting ===
He began his foray into scriptwriting while attending secondary school at the Malay College Kuala Kangsar and won an award at the Malaysia Theatre Festival for his debut work, Tat Nenas. Subsequently, he established the company Aroma Teater Works alongside his friends, utilizing the RM 20,000 cash prize he had received at the Malaysia Theatre Festival. Furthermore, around 2003 and 2004, he also produced a theatre performance for which no admission fee was charged; the production was attended by only six audience members.

Redza graduated with a degree in business studies from Multimedia University and has authored works including Gadis Jalan Burmah, Toast, and I Lost The Plot. He also ventured into acting, starting with his first theatrical production, Otak Tak Center. Through this play, he met Bernard Chauly, a film and drama director. Subsequently, Bernard invited him to take on supporting roles in the dramas Gol & Gincu The Series and Goda.

He used to attend a Shakespeare theatre workshop, held free of charge at Menara Duta, Sri Hartamas, every Wednesday and Saturday. The workshop was conducted by a theatre instructor Chris Jacob.

=== Finance ===
Redza work as a investment analyst for local financial institution.

In June 2026, Redza updated his status on LinkedIn showing he is working as a deputy director at Bank Negara Malaysia.

== Personal life ==
Redza became an orphan at the age of three when his father passed away. Since then, he has been raised by his mother.

He had been planning his wedding since 2010, but it had to be postponed due to certain factors. On 17 June 2011, he finally married Aidira Khaidir, who had been his junior during their time at Multimedia University. He had known her for the past 10 years, ever since they participated in a theatrical production together. The wedding reception was held the day after the solemnization ceremony. The couple has a son born in 2012 and daughter born in 2017.

== Filmography ==
=== Film ===
Year	Title	Credited as			Character	Note
Year	Title	Actor	Screenwriter	Producer	Character	Note
2009	Pisau Cukur	Yes	No	No	Faqir	Debut film
2013	KIL	Yes	No	No	Akil / Kil	
2014	Nova	Yes	Story	Yes	Cinema Goer 1	Special appearance, as co-producer
2016	Interchange	No	Yes	No	—N/a	
2018	Orang Itu	Yes	No	No	Din	
2019	Motif	Yes	No	No	IIham (voice)	
2023	Imaginur	No	Yes	Yes	—N/a	As co-producer

=== Short film ===
Year	Title	Character	Note
2011	Lightbulb	Penyiasat	Debut short film
2012	Pasport Ekspres	Narrator	
2012	Lupa!		
2018	Kopi		
2018	Pengasih		As writer

=== Telefilm ===
Year	Title	Character	TV station	Note
2012	Aku, Dia dan Tong Sampah	Master of ceremonies	TV9	First telefilm
2013	90 Hari	Bani	TV9	
2015	Aku, Dia & Tong Gas	Cameo	TV9	
2017	Kekasih Elektrik	Amri	Astro Citra	
2017	Gadis Kosmos	Amri	Astro Citra	
2017	Rasuk	—N/a	Astro Citra	Original story

=== TV series ===
Year	Title	Character	TV station	Note
2005	Gol & Gincu The Series		8TV	Debut series
2008	Goda	M	8TV	
2011	Kasih Najiha	Fendi	TV9	
2018	Folklore		HBO Asia	Episode: "Toyol"

== Shows and commercials ==
Year	Title	Character	TV station	Note	Production
2012	Hot Guys Who Cook (Season 1 ; Episode 6)	Redza Minhat	Diva Universal	In this program, he prepared a simple dish: instant noodles. The ingredients he used included eggs, onions, garlic, chili, carrots, and leafy vegetables, along with one other ingredient that he kept secret.	Diva Universal
2013	The Disko Baldi Show	Various	8TV	This show presents various social issues, interwoven with humor on stage.	PhuturePhlow Films

=== Advertisement ===
Year	Title	Character	Note	Production
2011	Diva Universal Raya Promo	Akil	He acted alongside Cristina Suzanne in a Hari Raya-themed commercial for Diva Universal.	Diva Universal
2012	Petronas 2012 Deepavali	Erman	He delivered a special address in conjunction with the Deepavali celebration.	Petronas
2012	Strangers	Erman	He conducted a filming session in Uzbekistan themed around the festive season, which was sponsored by Petronas.	Petronas

=== Theatre ===
There are some productions in which he did not act, serving only as the screenwriter.

Title	Organized by
Tat Nenas	AROMA Theatre Works
Kelab Malam	AROMA Theatre Works
Romeo & Juliet	UM
Tunku Kudin	UM
Bercakap Dengan Pria	AROMA Theatre Works
Otak Tak Center	Dramalab
Coffee & Toast!	Dramalab
Gadis Jalan Burmah	Dramalab / The Actor's Studio
I Lost The Plot	Dramalab
ALLAH!	The Actor's Studio
Wacky Bar	PJ Live Arts
Rancangan Harijadi Terhebat Adli	The Actor's Studio
RPT: Scandalicious Issue	PJ Live Arts
Medea	The Actor's Studio
Money	Stor Teater Dewan Bahasa dan Pustaka
Energia	Stor Teater Dewan Bahasa dan Pustaka
Serangan Zombi Pertama di Kuala Lumpur	The Actor's Studio
KLUE, DOH!	PJ Live Arts
Projek Disko Baldi Dreams	PJ Live Arts
Projek Disko Baldi in Love	PJ Live Arts

== Awards and nominations ==
Year	Award	Note	Result
2004	Best Performance	He won this category together with Megat Sharizal for the work "Tat Nenas." This entry was nominated at the 2004 Malaysia Theatre Festival.	Won
2010	Best New Male Actor	This category was nominated at the 23rd Malaysia Film Festival.	Nominated
2010	Best Supporting Actor	This category was nominated at 2010 Anugerah Skrin.	Nominated
2013	Best On-Screen Chemistry Award	He received this nomination alongside Cristina Suzanne for their roles as the lead actors in the film KIL. This nomination was presented by the 2013 Shout! Awards.	Nominated
2013	Hot Guy Award	This award was received for the first time at the 2013 Shout! Awards, but the nominee lost to five other competitors.	Nominated
2013	Best Male Actor	This category is nominated at 2013 Anugerah Skrin.	Nominated
2024	Best Screenplay	This category is nominated at the 33rd Malaysian Film Festival.	Nominated
2024	Best Original Story	This category is nominated at the 33rd Malaysian Film Festival.	Won
