= Patrick Teoh =

Malaysian actor (born 1947)

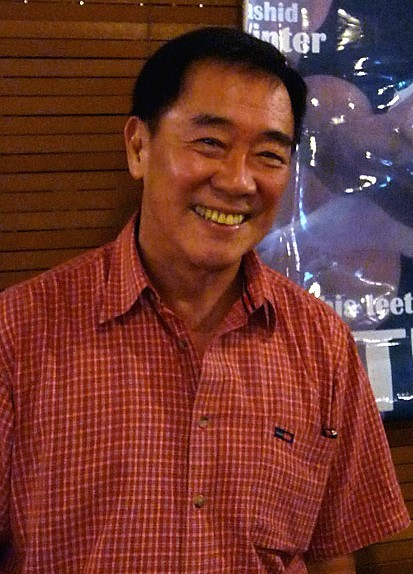
- Teoh in 2008
- Born: 16 October 1947 (age 79); Ipoh, Perak, Malaysia
- Occupations: Actor; radio personality
- Years active: 1966–present
- Height: 5 ft 4 in (163 cm)

Chinese name
- Traditional Chinese: 張家揚
- Simplified Chinese: 张家扬

Patrick Teoh Kah Yong (born 16 October 1947) is a Malaysian actor and radio personality. A career in radio, on TV, stage and in movies spanning more than five decades earned Teoh the nickname of "Voice of Malaysia", bestowed by his fans and the Malaysian mass media.

== Early life ==
Teoh was born in Ipoh, Perak, Malaysia.

Teoh contracted polio when he was 7 years old

He attended St. Michael's Institution up until Form 5. Teoh learned to speak English before he even went to school by watching movies as a child that. His father took him and his mother to the movies every day for the 9.15 p.m. screening. From this routine of watching a movie a day, Teoh learned to speak English by watching actors such as John Wayne, Randolph Scott, Henry Fonda and James Stewart. This personal habit of going to the cinema everyday stayed with Teoh until he was 24 years old and was the only "hobby" he claims he had. His personal record was watching six movies in a single day.

After high school, Teoh remained in Ipoh and became a life insurance and encyclopaedia salesman working on commission for a few years. In 1966, Rediffusion, a cable radio station announced that they had vacancies for radio announcers. Teoh applied, was called for an interview and got the job soon after at the age of 19.

== Career ==
=== 1966–1970s: Rediffusion ===
In 1966, Teoh joined Rediffusion as an "English Programme Announcer Grade 3", earning RM$150 a month. For the first three months, he was not allowed to enter the studio. Instead, he wrote scripts and picked out songs for 'Lunch Time Melodies'. At the end of the three months, he was allowed to work in the studio during non-peak hours, where his primary duty was to press buttons to air pre-recorded programmes. After six months, he was allowed to go "on air," reading from pre-approved scripts. Within two years, Teoh was promoted to Assistant Programme Manager. A year later, in 1968, he was again promoted, this time to Programme Manager. He was later promoted to English Programme Supervisor.

A few years later, Teoh was made the Divisional Manager for 'Sound and Film Services', a division set up by Rediffusion to tap into the advertising industry. Due to a nationwide demand for Teoh's voice talent, the division did well and in less than 9 months, it was in the black.

The then-managing director told Teoh that according to the terms of his employment contract he was only entitled to a salary and all monies earned from his professional talents (which included being a professional voice talent) rightfully belonged to the company. But as Teoh was a model employee, the managing director would make an exception and allow him to keep 50% of his voice-over fees. Teoh, who was then earning up to six times his salary in voice-over fees disagreed with the new terms, and resigned from Rediffusion having been there for more than a decade.

=== Voice of Malaysia ===
During Teoh's last few years with Rediffusion, Malaysia was going through an advertising boom. The government introduced a 'Made in Malaysia' ruling: 65% of the elements in commercials meant to be aired over electronic media had to be of Malaysian origin, or Malaysian-made. It was at this juncture that Teoh was very often called upon to do voice-over work. At this point of his career, arguably 90% of English advertisements aired over Malaysian electronic media were voiced by Teoh. Additionally Teoh's voice also announced MAS safety and emergency procedure recordings. It was at this point that Teoh distinctive baritone and clean, crisp diction earned him the moniker the "Voice of Malaysia".

=== Disco Fever ===
When disco music became popular Teoh jumped on the bandwagon and was credited as being a Malaysian mobile disco pioneer. In the mid-1970s, the disco era exploded across the country. At that time, Teoh was frequently employed as a DJ for private parties and in-house company functions. During an annual ball for the advertising industry, he was brought in as 'support' for the performing band when they took their set breaks. The crowd reacted positively to the disco tunes that he played, and he was asked to perform for the rest of the night. After the ball, he was asked to perform at more private functions, spinning popular disco tracks. Seeing the popularity of 'mobile disco', Teoh started "The Music Machine" for that purpose. He wound up multiplying his initial sound and light show six times becoming the largest mobile disco entrepreneur in the country.

=== 1985–late 1980s: Newscasting ===
Teoh, alongside Mahadzir Lokman, Wan Zaleha Radzi, Robert Lam, and Caryn Lim were hired to be newscasters for the then-new TV3 in 1985, whose coverage at that time was limited to the Klang Valley. On 20 September 1988, the second last day of Caryn Lim's job at TV3, Teoh was her co-newscaster. Teoh mentioned that Caryn was leaving the station, then stood up and gave her a friendly farewell peck on her cheek. Apparently the camera was still rolling when the kiss happened and Teoh did not notice it. Controversy ensued as the press (mostly the Chinese press) created a ruckus over the kiss aired live on television. Viewers who were shocked called to the Malay Mail, with one caller saying that he did not believe his eyes when he saw the kiss. Speaking to The Straits Times, Teoh said he was happy but sad for Lim as she would be leaving for Singapore's SBC.

After two years on TV3, Teoh found his news reading schedule was reduced. When he approached his editor about his reduced time on air, he was informed that from the following month onwards, his services would no longer be required. Teoh does not know the exact reason for his termination.

=== 1994–1997: Radio 4 ===
In 1994, the new 24-hour radio station Time Highway Radio proved to be competition to RTM's existing radio stations. Hence RTM decided to re-brand Radio 4, and brought in new DJs such as Patrick and Yasmin Yusoff. Teoh's talk show slot was from 9 a.m. until 12 noon, Mondays to Wednesdays. When Radio 4 went for 24-hour broadcasting, Teoh also hosted a weekly 12 a.m. until 3 a.m. slot calling it 'Midnight Magic'. For Midnight Magic Teoh invited listeners to call in and tell ghost stories, a move that proved to be a hit among his listeners.

Teoh's radio slots became very popular, and after a while he felt that his programmes should be taken one step further to be a better talk show. However he was denied the resources to improve his shows. In 1997, Teoh resigned from Radio 4, and until this day has not returned to radio. During his time on Radio 4 Teoh gained a reputation for being "controversial". This came about as Teoh would discuss current affairs on air and invite listeners to call in with their views. This led to live on air debates and arguments about the talk of the country. It was the first time in Malaysian history that everyday listeners were allowed to air their views on live national radio.

=== 1980s–present: Stage and television acting ===
In 1989, Joe Hasham and Faridah Merican set up The Actors Studio. One of their first projects was an introductory acting course, and they invited Teoh to join. After the course, The Actors Studio staged "A Man For All Seasons." Teoh was offered the cameo role of Cardinal Wolsey, his first appearance on the Malaysian stage. In 2021 Teoh once again acted in a production of the same play this time landing the role of Thomas Cromwell, the villain in the play. It was the role he had craved decades earlier. In 2022 Teoh reprised the role of SB Tan in a production of "Philadelphia, Here I Come." Presently Teoh is a full-time performing member of the Instant Café Theatre Company.

=== Incidents ===
- January 1996: A listener from Penang called in during one of Teoh's shows to relate his recent experience with a member of the police force. At a roadblock, a policeman had stopped him for allegedly drinking and driving, and asked for a bribe from the listener. When he said that he did not have money with him, the police officer allegedly told him that he could call someone to bring him the money. When he said that he did not have a phone, the officer allegedly offered him the use of his own personal mobile phone. After the show, SAC Supian Amat lodged a police report against Teoh under the instruction of Rahim Noor, then the IGP of Malaysia. This resulted in Teoh being called to the police station for interviews. The media went to town with this issue; famous local cartoonist Lat drew a satirical cartoon about the incident which was published in the New Straits Times.
- April 1996: For April Fools' Day that year, Teoh collaborated with a friend on a prank about ducks. During his radio show, Teoh took a call from an advertising agency (who was in fact his friend) looking for ducks to be featured in a commercial for a new snack. According to the person who called in, the concept was to place ducks on a hot plate, so they would jump about. Real listeners called in to the call-in show to blast the ad agency. Some called for the responsible ad agency executive's dismissal and when it was revealed an Australian writer had created the ad, the usual "patriotic" call came in, "How can foreigners come to our country and..." Teoh 'called' the head of the agency, passing on his listeners' ire and the agency boss 'fired' the writer, live, on air. When this happened listeners changed their tune, "Hiyah Patrick how can you break someone's rice bowl? It's only a duck lah..." Later another accomplice called in to represent the National Group for Animal Protection (NGAP). The acronym sound like the Cantonese word for 'duck'. Could there be a more obvious give away that this was all a ruse? Complaints were made to the SPCA who lodged a police report. When it was revealed that the 'dancing ducks' episode was an April Fool's joke, the press went to town saying Teoh was being irresponsible, some even calling for his resignation. Teoh's response, "Can't you take a joke? Lighten up a little bit, you know."
- During a broadcast of 'Midnight Magic', Teoh ran a segment entitled "Interview with a Vampire". This was to cash in on the then hit movie starring Tom Cruise and Brad Pitt. A listener, claiming to be a vampire, called in, wanting to dispel all myths associated with vampires, 'I need blood but i do not run around looking for beautiful virgins with deep cleavage. I do live longer than most but I will eventually die. I don't go out in the sun because I have very sensitive eyes. The show received a very high listener rating. For three hours listeners called in with questions for the vampire, 'Can you fly? Can you change into a bat? Do you live forever? Do you sleep in a coffin?' The only intelligent comment came from a young caller who, claiming to be wheel-chair bound, said, 'I know what it's like to be different.' The next day, RTM received multiple complains from other listeners objecting to the 'promotion of myths', claiming that their children and elderly family members were scared by the content of the show. Teoh was asked to take a 2-week vacation to let the furore die down.
- In January 2013, the PAS-led Kedah state government established restrictions for the upcoming Chinese New Year Celebration with just music and singing. Teoh posted a heart-felt condemnation of the PAS Chinese New Year restrictions on his Facebook page and all hell broke lose. His personal remarks were poorly received, and he received some death threats. Some infuriated Muslims accused Teoh of being anti-Islam. Teoh has since apologised for his remarks and removed the original offending post.
- In early May 2020, Teoh reacted to a video posted by the Crown Prince of Johor. In the video the Prince and his friends showed off their collection of firearms and shot at targets on his range. Teoh, in a facebook video post questioned the underlying message the Crown Prince was trying to convey referring to the Prince as 'the fler' and ending his post with his traditional sign-off, 'Niamah!' A police report was lodged against Teoh in Johor and on 9 May, police from Johor Bahru (JB) came to Petaling Jaya to arrest Teoh and escorted him back to JB where he was kept in remand for 5 days. The police report was not made by the Crown Prince or anyone from the Royal palace. Teoh was accused of posting an insulting video on his Facebook Page towards The Crown Prince of Johor Tunku Ismail Idris. The post has since been removed. Teoh was released on bail on 14 May 2020.

== Theatrical performances ==
Year	Title	Role
1991	Twelfth Night	The Sea Captain
1992	MacBeth	King Duncan / The porter
1993	Philadelphia, Here I Come	The father
1993	Death and the Maiden	Dr. Rivaldo
1999	Accidental Death of an Anarchist	Superintendent
1999	Gross Indecency, The Trials of Oscar Wilde	Queensbury
2000	Executive Spa	Multiple characters
2000	The Merchant of Venice	Shylock
2001	Goldfish Tale	Ah Kong
2002	Wish I Was There	Old man
2005	Hamlet in Malay	Polonius
2006	Julius Caesar	Cassius
2006	The Homecoming	Sam
2006	Frankenstein in Love	General Garcia Perez
2007	Wrecks	Edward Carr
2011	In Perfect Harmony	Narrator
Undated	A Man for All Seasons	Cardinal Wolsey
Undated	Antigone	Creon
Undated	Savages	General Garcia
Undated	Life Sdn Bhd Parts I, II, III	Multiple characters
Undated	Me, The Mortal	Multiple characters
Undated	Stage	The janitor

== Filmography ==
=== Film ===
Year	Title	Role	Notes
1998	Return to Paradise	Chief Justice	
1999	Anna and the King	Third Judge	
2000	Lips To Lips	Patrick	
2003	The Big Durian	Aloysius Tham	
2004	The Beautiful Washing Machine	Mr. Wong	
2004	Buli	Tan Sri Michael	
2005	Baik Punya Cilok	Uncle Wong	
2005	Monday Morning Glory	Police Chief	
2006	Buli Balik	Tan Sri Michael	
2006	Before We Fall in Love Again	Master Wong	Cameo
2006	The Red Kebaya	Choong	
2007	Sumolah	Mr. Honda	
2007	Kinta 1881	Master Hung	
2008	Bernafas Dalam Lumpur		Cameo
2009	The Blue Mansion	Wee Bak Chuan	
2010	Kapoww!	Fashion Designer	
2011	Stretch	The Man	
2011	Sini Ada Hantu	Uncle Ma Zhai	
2011	Ratu The Movie	Boss Hana	
2011	Karipap-Karipap Cinta	Uncle Hong	
2011	Nasi Lemak 2.0	Judge	
2012	The Collector	Uncle Wong	
2013	Final Recipe	Mr. Lee	
2014	Cuak	Mr. Wong	
2014	Take Me to Dinner	Edward	
2016	Hanyut	Jim Eng	
2018	Republic of Food	Old Chia	
2018	The Spiral	Professor Lee	
2021	Influencer	Droid Shopkeeper	Short film

=== Television ===
Year	Title	Role	Network	Notes
2004	Show Me The Money		NTV7	
2004	Ah-Ha		TV3	
2005	Daddy's Girls		Mediacorp Channel 5	
2006–2007	Jazz Café	himself, as host	TV2	Music / talk show host
2007	My Starz	himself, as judge	TV3	Reality show
2008	En Bloc	Lim Teik Beng	MediaCorp	TV series
2008	First Class	Mr. Gay Beh Song	MediaCorp	TV series
2008	Dream Hotel	Mr. Wong	German TV	
2009	Red Thread	Kong Wah	MediaCorp	40-episode TV series
2009	Angel		MediaCorp	Telemovie
2009	Ten Ten Ten	Ensemble	Astro Warna	TV series for Tall Order Productions
2009	The Philanthropist	General Nyo	NBC	TV series
2011	Love And Death On Java	Dr. Ling		German telemovie
2011	Rendezvous in Malaysia	Patrick Lim		German telemovie
2011	The Pupil	Teoh	MediaCorp Channel 5	
2014	Marco Polo (Season 1)	General Red Brow	Netflix	7 episodes
2015	Love Is Love	Han		
2016	Dark Triptych			
2020	The Bridge (Season 2)	Mr. Ong	Viu/HBO Asia	
2021	Keluarga Baha Don (Season 3)	Profesor Jack D	Viu	

== Other projects ==
- In the 1970s, Teoh hosted a radio show on RTM called "Kee Huat's Fantastic Facts and Fancies". The show format was similar to Ripley's Believe It Or Not. "Kee Huat's Fantastic Facts and Fancies" was the longest, uninterrupted sponsored radio programme in Malaysia history, running for 26 years. Til this day it is thought that Teoh hosted the show forever but, in reality, he was merely the show's last host.
- In 1984, Teoh started a post-production studio, " Addaudio" to be an indirect competition to Rediffusion. The company is in operation today.
- In 1999, Teoh was appointed Dialogue and Voice Director for Walt Disney Pictures' first ever venture to dub a major animated feature film into Malaysian Malay, which was Tarzan.

== Awards and nominations ==
Year	Award	Category	Title	Result
2006	Cameronian Arts Awards	Best Actor in a Leading Role	We Are Family	Nominated
2006	Chinese Theater Awards	Best Actor in a Leading Role	We Are Family	Nominated
2007	Cameronian Arts Awards	Best Actor in a Supporting Role	The Homecoming	Nominated
2007	20th Malaysia Film Festival	Best Actor in a Supporting Role	Sumolah	Nominated
2008	13th Asian Television Awards	Best Drama Performance by an Actor	En Bloc	Nominated
2009	14th Asian Television Awards	Best Drama Performance by an Actor	Red Thread	Nominated

- 2011: CHT Pursuit of Excellence (Male Artist) Award 2011
