= Pisau Cukur =

2009 Malaysian film

- Theatrical poster
- Directed by: Bernard Chauly
- Written by: Rafidah Abdullah
- Screenplay by: Rafidah Abdullah
- Story by: Rafidah Abdullah
- Produced by: Lina Tan; Alan Tan (executive); Ahmad Puad Onah (executive); Mee Fung Lee (executive)
- Starring: Nur Fazura; Maya Karin; Aaron Aziz; Eizlan Yusof
- Cinematography: Haris Hue Abdullah
- Edited by: Farra Aizurin Zulkarnain
- Production companies: Grand Brilliance; Redfilms
- Distributed by: Primeworks Studios
- Release date: 5 November 2009 (Malaysia)
- Running time: 104 minit
- Country: Malaysia
- Language: Malay
- Budget: MYR 1.40 million
- Box office: MYR 2.32 million

Pisau Cukur (English: Razor Knife, but also metaphorically Gold Digger) is a 2009 Malaysian Malay-language mystery comedy film directed by Bernard Chauly, which is his first comedy after his 2005 blockbuster break-out drama Gol & Gincu. It stars popular Malaysian actresses Nur Fazura and Maya Karin, and Singaporean actor Aaron Aziz, and also features the debut film appearance of Henry Golding.

== Plot ==
The movie is about two best friends Bella (Maya Karin) and Intan (Nur Fazura) who go on vacation on a cruise ship. During the vacation, Bella searches for a rich husband which eventually leads her to Datuk Hisham (Eizlan Yusof), while Intan becomes involved with Ari (Aaron Aziz) in a murder case of the well known Datuk Zakaria Hitam (Rahim Razali).

== Development ==
A collaboration by Red Films and Primeworks Studios, the movie is written by Rafidah Abdullah (host of TV3's teen-oriented current affairs programme 3R and writer for Gol & Gincu). She has contributed towards a movie that is bound to create controversy in certain quarters. However, as the director has told the press, "People should watch and value the movie themselves because a quality movie will go beyond the superficial elements and entertain nevertheless."

== Cast ==
- Nur Fazura as Intan Mastura
- Maya Karin as Bella
- Aaron Aziz as Bahari Amri Ridzuan a.k.a. Ari
- Eizlan Yusof as Datuk Hisham Tan Sri Kamaruddin
- Redza Minhat as Faqir
- Rahim Razali as Datuk Zakaria Hitam
- Khatijah Tan as Datin Wahidah
- Umie Aida as Naini
- Sharifah Sofia as Sal
- Liyana Jasmay as Suri
- Nas-T as Johan
- Radhi Khalid as Dato Salleh
- Amelia Henderson as Young Bella
- Yasmin Yusoff as Hani
- Henry Golding as Iskandar Tan Sri Murad
- Nabila Huda as Natasha
- Othman Hafsham as Tengku Hamash Tengku Jamaluddin
- Lew Ngai Yuen as Angry woman
- Elaine Pedley as Dance coach

Several notable artists made cameos in this movie, such as Afdlin Shauki as the captain of the cruise ship. Comedian Nabil Ahmad plays the owner of Restaurant Marina; the cruise ship's yoga teacher; and host for the ship's in-house entertainment programme "Siapa Nak Kahwin Jutawan" (Malay: "Who Wants to Marry a Millionaire"), with Norman Abdul Halim of KRU playing the millionaire in question, Imran. The film's script writer Rafidah Abdullah cameos as the receptionist at Camar Spa while her colleague in "3R", Kartini Arrifin plays a newsreader. Bernice Chauly appears briefly as a teacher.
