= U-Wei Haji Saari =

Malaysian film director (born 1954)

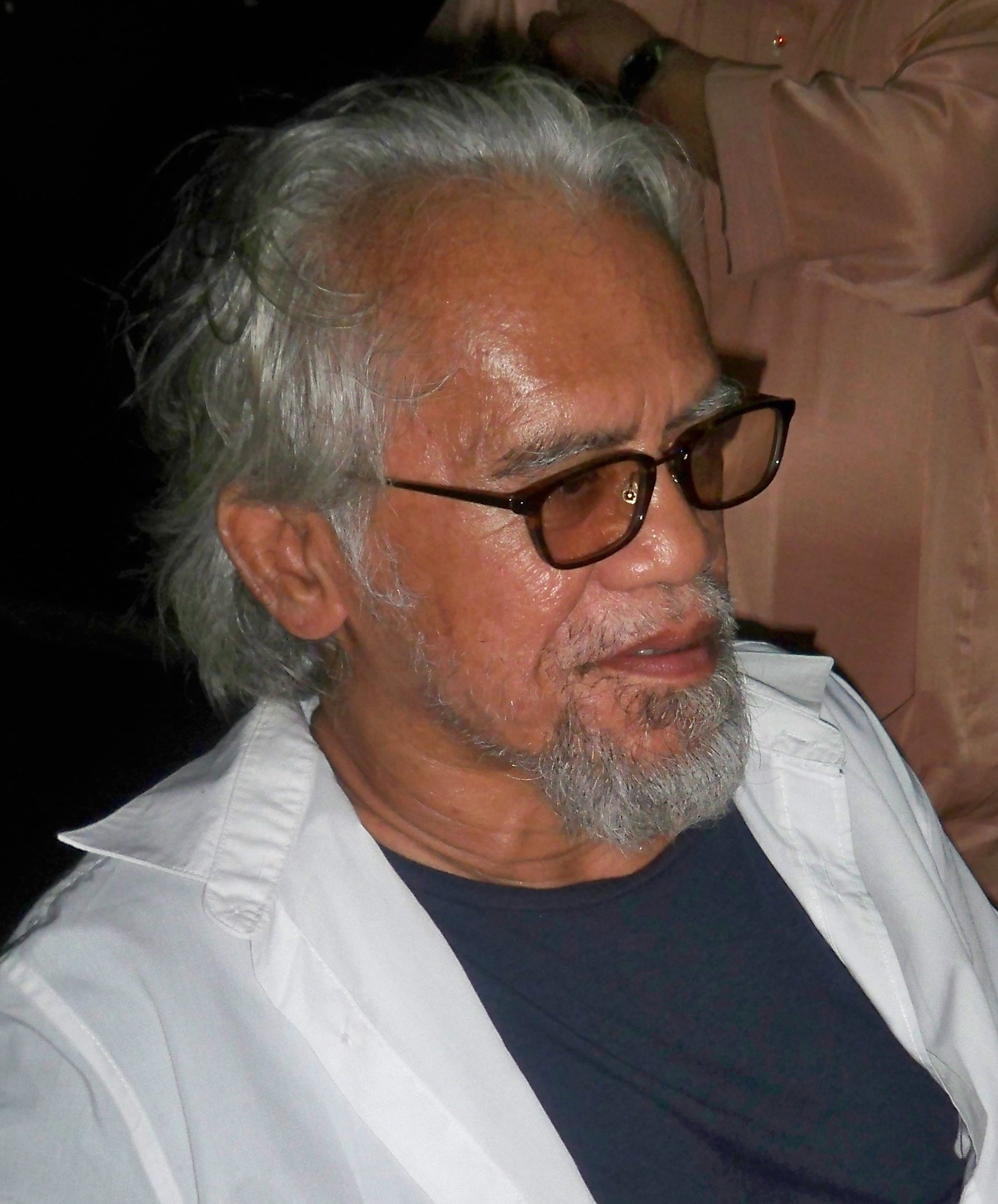
- Born: Zuhir bin Hj Saari; 13 May 1954 (age 72); Mentakab, Pahang, Federation of Malaya (now Malaysia)
- Occupations: film director, producer, screenwriter
- Years active: 1993 - present
- Known for: directed the first Malasian film The Arsonist which entered the Cannes Film Festival

Datuk U-Wei Haji Saari is a Malaysian film director. He first gained international attention with The Arsonist (more known by its Malay name Kaki Bakar), the first Malaysian film to enter the Cannes Film Festival in 1995.

== Career ==
=== Director ===
He began his career as a director for television dramas until 1996, when he made his film debut with the highly controversial Perempuan, Isteri dan..., which won him the Best Director award at the 11th Malaysia Film Festival.

In 2014, U-Wei produced a period film titled Hanyut as a co-production between the countries of Indonesia, Malaysia, and Australia. The film is based on Joseph Conrad's novel titled Almayer's Folly, which tells about the life of the Malay community in the 19th century.

== Filmography ==
=== Film ===
Year	Title	Role	Notes
1993	Perempuan, Isteri &...?	Director; Screenplay; Original Story	Best Director FFM 11; Play The Best Screen FFM 11; Best Original Story FFM 11
1994	Black Widow - Wajah Ayu	Director; Screenplay	
1999	Jogho	Producer; Director; Screenplay	Best Director FFM 14; Play The Best Screen FFM 14
2001	The Arsonist	Producer; Director; Screenplay	Best Movie (foreign language category) 17th Brussels International Free Festival, 1995 (Belgium); Special Jury Awards 1st South-East Asian Biennial Film Festival, 1997 (Phonm Pehn, Thailand)
2004	Buai Laju-laju	Director; Original Story	
2016	Hanyut	Executive Producer; Director; Screenplay	Play The Best Screen Anugerah Skrin 2017
