= Sherie Merlis =

Malaysian actress (born 1972)

- Born: Sharifah Saadah binti Wan Zainal Abidin; October 23, 1972 (age 53); Sibu, Sarawak, Malaysia
- Occupation: Actress
- Years active: 1990—present
- Spouses: Esma Daniel (m. 1992; div. 1997) Tengku Shafiz Rullah As Syafiee (m. 2012; div. 2023)
- Children: 4
- Parents: Wan Zainal Abidin Tuanku Habib Kassim (father); Raden Aini Raden Kasron (mother)

Sherie Merlis (born Sharifah Saadah binti Wan Zainal Abidin; 23 October 1972) is a Malaysian actress. Her acting career began in 1989 and she has received nominations in the Malaysia Film Festival, Screen Awards and Asian Film Awards.

== Life and career ==
Born in Sibu, Sarawak, she is the third of five siblings in an ethnic Malay family. Her parents are Wan Zainal Abidin Tuanku Habib Kassim and Raden Aini Raden Kasron. On her father's side, Sherie is of Arab and Sarawakian Malay descent, and on her mother's side she is of Pontianak Malay and Chinese descent. Her mother is related to the Pontianak Sultanate of Borneo. At the age of 17, Sherie Merlis started working as an actor in Kuala Lumpur, Malaysia.

In 2012 she married music producer Tengku Shafiz Rullah As Syafiee (former husband of Dira Abu Zahar), also known as Ash. They have two children: Tengku Kaseh Anaqah, born on July 1, 2012, and Tengku Areef Bolkiah As Syafiee, born on January 21, 2014.

== Filmography ==
=== Film ===
Year	Title	Role	Notes
1990	Part-Time		
2000	Leftenan Adnan	Tuminah	
2010	Janin	Munah	
2011	Chow Kit		
2013	Aku Pilih Kamu	Laila	
2014	Pintu Neraka	Datin Shereen	
2018	Lee Chong Wei	Latifah Sidek	
2019	Motif	Suri	
2020	Tyickoouns	Ramona mother	
2022	Talbis Iblis	Bomoh	
2023	Coast Guard Malaysia: Ops Helang	Khatijah	

=== Television series ===
Year	Title	Role	TV channel	Notes
1998–2002	Mat Despatch	Sherry	TV1	
	Daun Di Musim Luruh			
	Sejadah Terakhir			
	Teratai Layu Di Tasik Madu			
	Dendam Terlerai			
	Kamelia			
	Diari Dewi			
	Perempuan Atau Wanita			
2009	Kau Dan Aku			
2009	Warkah Terakhir: Rosli Dhobi		Astro Citra	
2011	Geng Surau		Astro Oasis	
2011	Cita & Cinta		TV9	
2011	Cinta Strawberi & Coklat			
2012	Perempuan Neraka			
2012	Bila Kucing Menangis			
2012	Sebelum Lima Perkara			
2012	Sebelum Kiamat			
2013	Karlos	Zai	TV3	
2014	Sehangat Dakapan Mama			
2014	Jangan Kafankan Dia			
2014	Malaikat Tersembunyi			
2014	Boria Raya			
2014	30 Hari Puasa			
2015	Delina	Kina	TV3	Guest actor
2016	Uda & Dara	Zaharah	Astro Prima	
2016	Tika Langit Terbuka		Astro Oasis	
2019	Ikatan Kasih Pinakol	Rubiah	TV2	
2020	Keluarga Baha Don (Season 2)	Beh Botani	Viu	
2021	i-Tanggang: Mother of All Lies	Erma	Astro Citra	
2022	Kau Cipta Kasih	Sabariah	TV3	
2022	Impian Lara	Kencana	Awesome TV	
2023	Nenek Bongkok Tiga	Nenek	Viu	
TBA	Biarlah Aku Cari Pengganti	Ibu Qistina	TV3	Special appearance
TBA	i-Tanggang 2	Erma	Astro Citra	

=== Telemovie ===
Year	Title	Role	TV channel
2005	Hantu Janet		
2006	Dee & Moon		
2011	Di Terlapak Kaki Bonda		TV3
2018	Hari-Hari Terakhir Pengurus		Astro Citra
2020	Rindu Tanpa Batas		

== Awards and nominations ==
- Screen Awards 2012 (ASK 2012) category of Best Supporting Actress Drama - Di Telapak Kaki Bonda directed by Kabir Bhatia.
