= Khalid Salleh =

Malaysian actor and poet (1948–2018)

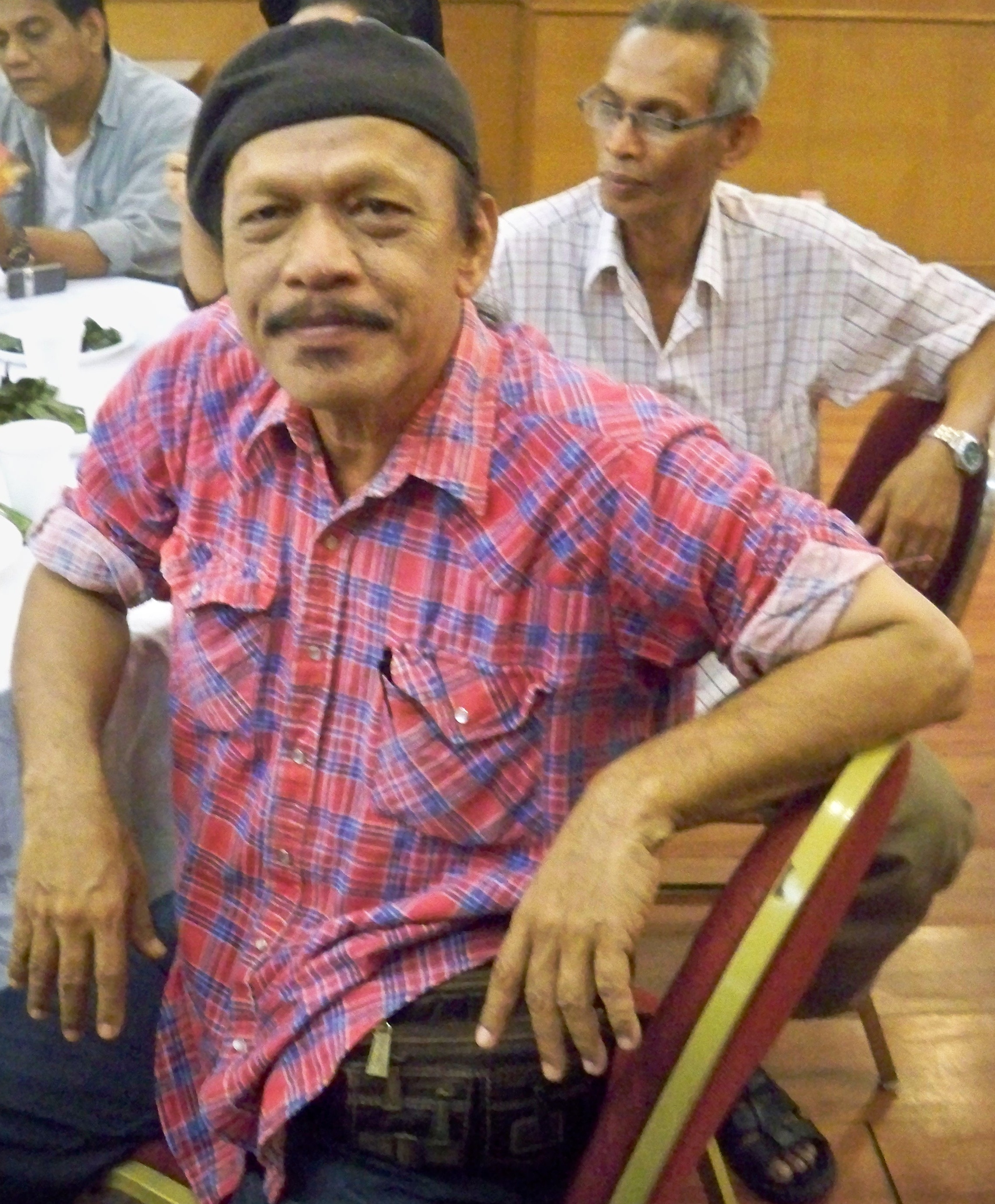
- Khalid Salleh in 2012
- Born: February 29, 1948; Kajang, Selangor, Federated Malay States
- Died: July 23, 2018 (aged 70); Kuala Lumpur, Malaysia
- Occupation: Actor
- Years active: 1970–2018

Khalid bin Salleh (29 February 1948 – 23 July 2018) was a Malaysian actor and poet.

== Brief biography ==
He was brought up in his aunt's family. He graduated from secondary school in Batu Pahat. At first he earned his living by selling medicines in the streets.

== Creativity ==
Played in the theater and in the films, recited his poems in solo performances. He was one of the leading actors in the theater of Krishen Jit and Dinsman in the 1970s (the play "This is not suicide", etc.). He took part in Monodrama Festivals in Taiwan (1989), Japan (1991), Calcutta (1994) and Delhi (1995). In 2014 he successfully performed the play-monologue "The seller of medicines."

The film "Kaki Bakar" with his participation was demonstrated at the Cannes Film Festival in 1995 (in 1996 this film received the highest prize of the Belgian Film Festival).

His poems were published in the anthology "Tidak apa-apa" (Nothing, 1998) and "Kalau aku jadi PM” (If I became Prime Minister, 2014). In 2011, he published a book-reflection on the current government policy and the fate of the indigenous population of the country "Melayu Hilang Di Dunia” (The Malays will disappear from the face of the earth).

== Translations into Russian ==
In the collection "Pokoryat Vishinu” (Conquer the height)

- Nothing (Tidak apa-apa)
- Listen to the voice of love (Dengarkanlah suara kemesraan)

== Filmography ==
=== Film ===
Year	Title	Role	Notes
1992	Penghujung Malam	Razak	
1993	Azizah The Legend	Sidi	
1999	Jogho	Mamat	
2001	Kaki Bakar	Kakang	
2004	Buai Laju-Laju	Ibrahim	
2016	Hanyut	Orang Kaya Tinggi	
2019	Motif	Father's Yasmin	Porthumous release

=== Television series ===
Year	Year	Title	Role	TV channel
1980	1980	Drama Minggu Ini: Pelari	Khalid	TV1

=== Television ===
Year	Title	Role	TV channel
2009	Expose Mistik	Host	Astro Prima

=== Theater ===
Year	Title
1998	Jejak Pahlawan

== Awards and nominations ==
- Prize of the 43rd Asian-Pacific Film Festival in Taipei for the best performance (film "Jogho") (1998)
- Prize of the 11th Malaysian Film Festival for the best performance of the supporting role (film "Aziza - Legend") (1994)
