= Almayer's Folly =

1895 novel by Joseph Conrad

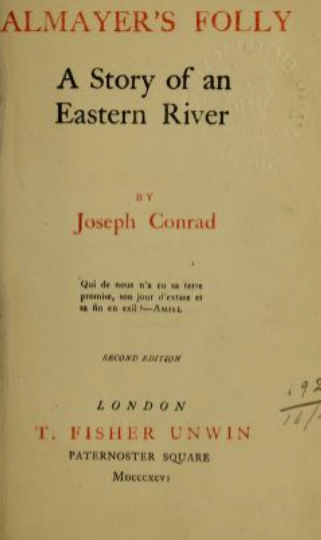
- Title page for Almayer's Folly (1896)
- Author: Joseph Conrad

Almayer's Folly is Joseph Conrad's first novel, published in 1895 by T. Fisher Unwin. An "action-packed adventure of pirates and gun-running" set in the late 19th century, it centres on the life of the Dutch trader Kaspar Almayer in the Borneo jungle and his relationship to his mixed heritage daughter Nina. The character of Kaspar Almayer is based on a Dutch local trader by the name of William Charles Olmeijer.

== Plot ==
Almayer's Folly is about a poor Dutch colonial trader who dreams of finding a hidden gold mine and becoming very wealthy. He is a white European, married to a native Malayan; they have one daughter named Nina. They live in the village of Sambir, based on Tanjung Redeb in the Berau Regency of the East Kalimantan province, Indonesia. He fails to find the gold mine, and comes home saddened. Previously, he had heard that the British were planning to conquer the Pantai River (based on Berau River), and he had built a large, lavish house near where he resided at the time, in order to welcome the British, with whom he hopes he could trade. However, the conquest never took place, and the house remained unfinished. Some passing Dutch seamen had called the house "Almayer's Folly". Now, Almayer continually goes out for long trips, but eventually he stops doing so and stays home with his hopeless daydreams of riches and splendor. His native wife loathes him for this.

One day, a Malayan prince from Bali, Dain Maroola, comes to see Almayer about trading, and while there he falls in love with Nina. Mrs. Almayer keeps arranging meetings between Nina and Dain. She wants them to marry so her daughter could stay native, because she is highly distrustful of white men and their ways. Dain leaves but vows to return to help Almayer find the gold mine. When he does return, he goes straight to Lakamba, a Malayan Rajah, and tells him that he found the gold mine and that some Dutchmen had captured his ship. The Rajah tells his servant Babalatchi to kill Almayer before the Dutch arrive because he is not needed to find the gold now. The following morning, an unidentifiable native corpse is found floating in the river, wearing an ankle bracelet very similar to Dain's. Almayer is distraught because Dain is his only chance to find the mine. The corpse is actually that of his slave, who had died when his canoe overturned. Mrs. Almayer had suggested that Dain put his own anklet and ring on the body.

Mrs. Almayer plans to smuggle Dain away from the Dutch so he will not be arrested. She sneaks Nina away from her father, who is drinking with the Dutch. When Almayer awakes from his drunken stupor, a native slave girl tells him where Nina has gone, and Almayer tracks her to Dain's hiding place. Nina refuses to go back to avoid the slurs of the white society. Meanwhile, the slave girl informs the Dutch of Dain's whereabouts. Almayer declares that he could never forgive Nina but would help them escape by taking them to the mouth of the river, where a canoe will take them from the clutches of the Dutch. After they escape, Almayer erases his daughter’s footprints in the sand, and returns to his house. Mrs. Almayer runs away to the Rajah for protection, taking all of Dain's dowry with her. All alone, Almayer breaks all his furniture in his home office, piles it in the centre of the room, and sets fire to it, burning the entire house to the ground along with it. He spends the rest of his days in "[His] Folly", where he smokes opium to forget his daughter. He eventually dies there.

== Criticism ==
As Conrad's earliest novel, Almayer's Folly is often seen by critics as inferior to the author's later work because of its repetitive and at times awkward language. However, recent critics have paid more attention to Conrad's depiction of Nina as a self-determined female non-European character along with Aissa from Joseph Conrad's second novel, An Outcast of the Islands.

== Film adaptations ==
- An Italian-French-German TV adaptation was made in 1972 and directed by Vittorio Cottafavi, with filmscript by Louis Guilloux and Jean-Dominique de La Rochefoucauld, executive producer Etienne Laroche, with famous Italian actor-director Giorgio Albertazzi in the role of Almayer and Rosemarie Dexter as Nina.
- A French-Belgian adaptation entitled La Folie Almayer was made in 2011 directed by Chantal Akerman, with filming started in November 2010. It was later released on September the next year.
- A Malaysian film adaption of the novel is produced under the title Hanyut (alternatively indicated as "Mountain of Gold"), written and directed by U-Wei Haji Saari and starring Peter O'Brien as Kasper Almayer. The film was planned to be released after production finished in 2012, but it had to be postponed due to lack of funding for marketing and local distribution. It was released on 6 November 2014 (Indonesia) and 24 November 2016 (Malaysia).

== Sources ==
- Joseph Conrad, Almayer's Folly: A Story of an Eastern River, Random House, 1996.
