= The Arsonist (film) =

1995 film

- Directed by: U-Wei Haji Saari
- Written by: U-Wei Haji Saari
- Based on: Barn Burning by William Faulkner
- Produced by: Tini Arshad; U-Wei Haji Saari
- Starring: Ngasrizal Ngasri
- Cinematography: Ali Kong Hussein
- Edited by: Roslan Ramli
- Music by: Embie C. Noer
- Release date: May 1995
- Running time: 70 minutes
- Country: Malaysia
- Language: Malay

The Arsonist (Malay: Kaki bakar) is a 1995 Malaysian drama film directed by U-Wei Haji Saari based on the 1939 short story "Barn Burning" by William Faulkner. It was first screened in the Un Certain Regard section at the 1995 Cannes Film Festival, then later into Malaysian cinemas in 2001.

== Cast ==
- Khalid Salleh as Kakang
- Ngasrizal Ngasri as Raden Mas Kesuma, Kakang's youngest son
- Azizah Mahzan as Kakang's wife
- Anwar Idris as Mustapha
- Jamaluddin Kadir as Tuan Kassim
- Kuswadinata as Tok Empat
