= En Bloc =

- Created by: Emida Natalaray; Audrey Wee
- Starring: Patrick Teoh; June Lim; Darren Lim; Nick Shen; Andrea Fonseka; Nathaniel Ho; Rebecca Lim
- Country of origin: Singapore
- No. of seasons: 1
- No. of episodes: 8

Production
- Running time: 44 min (per episode)

Original release
- Network: MediaCorp TV Channel 5
- Release: March 5, 2008

En Bloc is a Singaporean drama produced by Mediacorp, a local TV station.

== Plot ==
The drama follows the Lim family and some residents of an old Tampines Grove condominium of the consequences of having their estate up for an en bloc sale for redevelopment. Every episode explores the dynamics of family relationships, the unfolding of family secrets and how they are affected and influenced by the wealth.

There are the reluctant parents, who dread the thought of leaving the home they've lived in for decades. There is the son with the troubled past, the opportunistic younger brother, the hot-headed young lawyer, the aimless youngest child, and the uneasy daughter-in-law.

== Cast ==
- Patrick Teoh as Lim Beng Teck
- June Lim as Lim May Lai
- Darren Lim as Andrew Lim
- Nick Shen as Eric Lim
- Andrea Fonseka as Cindy Lim
- Nat Ho as Jude Lim
- Rebecca Lim as Renee Sng

== Broadcasting History ==
- Season 1
  - March 5, 2008–Present
  - Wednesday, 8:30pm – 9:30pm

== Trivia ==
In reality, the "Tampines Grove" condominium, the show's main setting, is a real HDB Estate Prentice in Tampines.

The filming mainly took place at Pandan Valley and Pandan Valley's Laurels supermarket
