= Afdlin Shauki =

Malaysian actor and singer (born 1971)

Yang Hormat Dato' Afdlin Shauki DIMP
- افضلين شوقي
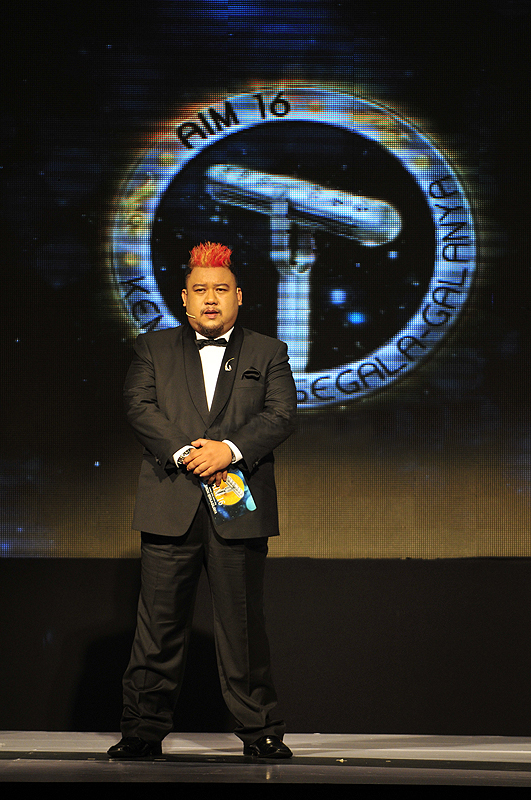
- Afdlin presenting the 16th Anugerah Industri Muzik in 2009
- Born: Afdlin Shauki bin Aksan; 19 May 1971 (age 55); Johor Bahru, Johor, Malaysia
- Other names: Chief Kodok, Alf
- Occupations: Actor, film director, singer, songwriter, television presenter, comedian, politician
- Years active: 1989–present
- Political party: People's Justice Party (PKR) (2021–present); United Malay National Organisation (UMNO) (2012-2020)
- Other political affiliations: Pakatan Harapan (PH) (2021–present); Barisan Nasional (BN) (2012-2020)
- Spouses: Datin Maria Christina Orow Abdullah (m. 1997; div. 2022) Datin Marcella (m. 2023)
- Children: 4
- Parents: Aksan Abu Bakar (father); Fadzilah Jelani (mother)

Afdlin Shauki bin Aksan (born 19 May 1971) is a Malaysian producer, screenwriter, director, actor, comedian, singer, songwriter, television presenter and politician.

== Career ==
=== Entertainment and media ===
==== Music ====
A singer, musician and live performer Afdlin, together with his band Acid Iz, presents a flavour of R&B, acid jazz and funk. His debut album FUUYO! was released in late 2003. In 1992, he performed for an audience of 50,000 in the 'Ikhlas Concert' alongside Zainal Abidin and Sheila Majid among others. He has performed in one of the most respected jazz clubs in Europe such as Ronnie Scott's, as an opening act for Sheila Majid for her 1996 UK Tour. He also made a guest appearance with David Foster's protege Jordan Hill for her 1997 Malaysian tour singing 'Till the end of time'.

He won the Best Ethnic Pop song category at the Anugerah Juara Lagu ke-19 in 2005 for a song he wrote for Dayang Nurfaizah called 'Erti Hidup'.

==== Television ====
Afdlin has been working as an actor, director and TV presenter. Afdlin received the award for Best Presenter in an Entertainment Programme during the prestigious 1999 Asian Television Awards for his role as the host on the late night talk show Bila Larut Malam on Astro. He has hosted the illustrious for six years running, as well as game shows, sports, music and lifestyle programmes.

==== Film ====
As a film actor, his local debut was as part of the supporting cast for Pesona Pictures' Mimpi Moon, which was followed by his role as the "Interpreter" in the Hollywood movie "Anna and the King". He played his first romantic lead in Serangkai Filem's Soal Hati, and was honoured with a Best Actor award for his portrayal of "Daniel" at the Anugerah Skrin Panca Delima Awards, 2000. He has since filmed "Soalnya Siapa?", a continuation of the story.

Afdlin has been involved in various direct-to-VCD projects, the latest being "Kelibat", a profit-sharing venture between the actors involved and Vision Works. For this project, Afdlin wrote, directed and acted simultaneously and the work was released in April 2004.

His screen debut as a writer and director, as well as lead actor, manifested in Buli a Grand Brilliance produced film about a technical savant and social misfit in a corporate and highly socialised world. He was awarded Most Promising New Director, Best Screenplay and Best Original Story in the 2005 Malaysian Film Festival for this work. In the same year he was awarded for Best Actor, Best Director and Best Screenplay at the Anugerah Skrin organized by TV3. An eventual sequel, "Buli Balik", was awarded Best Director, Best Original Story and Best Film Awards at the 2006 Malaysian Film Festival and also the Best Director and Best Screenplay Awards at the Anugerah Skrin (TV3) awards of the same year.

Other movies since then include Gila-Gila Pengantin Remaja, Pontianak, Biar Betul and Baik Punya Cilok (which received the Film Goer's Choice Award at the Anugerah Skrin Era Awards of 2006).

In 2007 he produced, co-directed and co-wrote Sumolah under his company Vision Works, which was invited to show at the Fukuoka International Film Festival. He also produced, directed and wrote "Los Dan Faun" under the same company. He played main and supportive roles in both films.

In 2009, Afdlin produced the film Papadom, a story about a distracted, busy father who loses his wife in an accident, and ends up becoming over-protective of his only daughter. This bittersweet comedy drama garnered multiple awards at the 22nd Malaysian Film Festival on the same year for the categories of Best Original Story, Best Actor, Best Film, as well as Best Music Score for Film. Afdlin and his co-star Liyana Jasmay also won the Couple With Best Chemistry in the 2010 Shout Awards organized by 8TV. "Papadom" was in competition in the Asia Pacific International Film Festival held in Taiwan in December 2009. The film also competed in the Osaka Asian Film Festival 2010 in the International Competition and received 3rd place out of 12 movies taking part in the Audience Choice Award. "Papadom" was re-made as a Tamil version for the Malaysian Tamil audience and was released in November 2010.

=== Politics ===
Afdlin Shauki joined UMNO in 2012, supporting the Barisan Nasional (BN) government under Najib Razak. He then joined the People's Justice Party (PKR) in March 2021 alongside rapper Altimet. In 2022, Afdlin contested the Setiawangsa PKR division chief position, challenging incumbent Nik Nazmi. Despite a "healthy contest" welcomed by Nik Nazmi, Afdlin lost by 110 votes. Following the election, he lodged a police report, alleging voting irregularities, including missing ballot papers and conflicts of interest among election officers.

In April 2025, Afdlin Shauki contested the Setiawangsa PKR division chief position again and won, defeating incumbent Nik Nazmi Nik Ahmad with 631 votes against 563. This victory marked a reversal of his defeat in 2022. Nik Nazmi, who also served as a PKR vice president and the Minister of Natural Resources and Environment, was unable to retain his position despite his experience and political profile.

Following his victory, Afdlin's leadership became a topic of public discussion after PKR deputy president Rafizi Ramli referred to him as a "professional comedian." In response, Afdlin emphasized his commitment to PKR and defended his background in the arts, asserting that diverse professional experiences should not constitute a barrier to political leadership. He further stated that he joined PKR during a challenging period following the Sheraton Move, when the party experienced significant setbacks, rather than waiting for opportunities when the party was in power.

== Filmography ==
=== Film ===
Year	Title	Credited as			Role	Notes
Year	Title	Actor	Director	Screenwriter	Role	Notes
1999	Anna and the King	Yes	No	No	Interpreter	Hollywood debut film
2000	Mimpi Moon	Yes	No	No	Sook Van	
2000	Soal Hati	Yes	No	No	Ahmad Daniel	
2002	Gerak Khas The Movie II	Yes	No	No	Wahid	
2002	Soalnya Siapa?	Yes	No	No	Ahmad Daniel	
2003	City Sharks	Yes	No	No	Zul	Singaporean movie
2004	Buli	Yes	Yes	Yes	Nordin	
2004	Gila-Gila Pengantin Remaja	Yes	No	No	Bakar	
2004	Pontianak Harum Sundal Malam	Yes	No	No	Admiral Madura	
2004	Biar Betul	Yes	No	No	Fuad	
2004	Kelibat	Yes	Yes	Yes	Selamat	As producer, Direct-to-VCD
2005	Gila-Gila Pengantin Popular	Yes	No	No	Awin	
2005	Baik Punya Cilok	Yes	Yes	Yes	Aben	As producer
2006	Buli Balik	Yes	Yes	Yes	Nordin	As producer
2006	Diva Popular	Yes	No	No	Jojo	
2007	Sumolah	Yes	Yes	Yes	Ramlee	As executive producer
2007	Brave	Yes	Yes	No	Tong	Thai movie
2008	Cuci	Yes	No	No	Fairil	
2008	Sepi	Yes	No	No	Adam	
2008	Los dan Faun	Yes	Yes	Yes	Soffarudin Al Sogood	As executive producer
2009	Setem	Yes	No	No	Joe	
2009	Papadom	Yes	Yes	Yes	Saadom	
2009	Pisau Cukur	Yes	No	No	Ship Captain	
2009	My Spy	No	Yes	No	—	
2010	Kapoww!	Yes	No	No	Din Abu	
2011	Homecoming	Yes	No	No	Taxi driver	Singaporean movie
2011	Help! My Girlfriend Is A Vampire	Yes	No	No	Don	
2011	Nasi Lemak 2.0	Yes	No	No	Fisherman	
2011	Vote!	Yes	No	No		Video short
2011	Old Road Mistery	Yes	Yes	Yes	Harak	
2011	Appalam	Yes	Yes	Yes	Hassan	Movie itself is a Tamil remake of Papadom
2012	Azura	Yes	No	No	Tan Sri Putih	
2012	Untuk Tiga Hari	Yes	Yes	Yes	Armi	
2012	Berani Punya Budak	Yes	Yes	Yes	Shuhaimi Abdullah / Tong	As executive producer
2012	Pontianak vs Orang Minyak	Yes	Yes	Yes	Pak Rejab	
2013	Husin, Mon dan Jin Pakai Toncit	Yes	No	No	Wahab B.	
2013	Lawak ke der? 2	Yes	No	No	Boboi	
2013	Ops Kossa Dappa 3	Yes	No	No		Tamil movie
2013	Boboi The Origin	Yes	Yes	Yes	Boboiyot	
2013	Bola Kampung: The Movie	Yes	No	No	Sabok	Voice only
2013	Papadom 2	Yes	Yes	Yes	Saadom	As executive producer
2014	Kami Histeria	Yes	No	No	Himself	
2018	The Big Day	Yes	No	No	Inspector Rashid	Singaporean movie, special appearance
2019	Bikers Kental 2	Yes	No	No	Aidid	
2022	Cikgu VS Hantu	Yes	No	No	Cikgu Daud	
2023	Imaginur	Yes	No	No	Dr Ramli	
2023	Polis Evo 3	Yes	No	No	Kassim	
2024	Harimau Malaya: The Untold Journey	Yes	Yes	Yes	Roslan	
2024	Baik Punya Ah Long	Yes	Yes	Yes	Lan Panda	
2025	Banduan	Yes	No	No	Yahya	
2026	5 Bomoh	Yes	No	No	Bomoh Mbah Slamet	

=== Television ===
Year	Title	Role	TV channel	Notes
1989	Senandung Irama		TV1	
1998	Kopitiam	Pete Ramlee	NTV7	1 episodes
1999–2000	Bila Larut Malam	Host	Astro Ria	
2002–2005	Phua Chu Kang Pte Ltd	Bobo	Mediacorp Channel 5	15 episodes
2004–2005	Ah-Ha		TV3	
2004–2007	Show Me The Money		NTV7	
2015	Bola Kampung	Sabok (voice)	TV1	
2008	Babak Empat Madu Tiga	Jamil	Astro Prima	A part of a telemovie anthology
2008	Orang Minyak Naik Minyak		Astro Prima	Telemovie
2009	Spontan	Himself (host)	Astro Warna	
2009	Mandi	Himself (guest)	Astro Warna	
2009–2010	Redah Kasi Pecah	Himself (guest)	Astro Warna	
2010–2011	Raja Lawak Astro	Himself (permanent judge)	Astro Prima	Comedy talent show
2010–2011	Oh Yeah		Astro Warna	
2012	Upin & Ipin (Season 6)	Himself (voice)	TV9	Episode: "Raja Buah"
2013–2014	Liga Lawak Superstar	Host	TV3	with Adibah Noor
2013–2015	Bintang Mencari Bintang		TV3	
2014	Nostalgila	Pakcik	Astro First Exclusive	Telemovie
2017	Konsert Komedi	Himself - Week 5 (Baik Punya Cilok)	Astro Warna	
2017	Bas Stop	Himself	Astro Warna	
2017	Kasut Bola Pink	Prof. Tipu	Astro First Exclusive	Telemovie
2019	Emma Sofea: All in the Family	Norman James D'Cruz	Disney Channel	TV short
2019	Wizards of Warna Walk	Norman James D'Cruz	Disney Channel	14 episodes
2020	Warung Wak	Wak Zamzam	Awesome TV	
2022	Bini-Bini Lockdown	Azim	TV3	Telemovie
2022	AI.5YA	Dato Soffaruddin Al Sogud	Viu	As director, screenwriter and executive producer
2023	Mega Spontan	Game Master	Astro Warna	

== Stage ==
Year	Title	Role	Notes
2004	Actorlympics		
2005	Why you still fat?		
2009	Cuci	Fairil	Based on the 2008 film Cuci

== Discography ==
=== Fuuyo! (2003) ===
  - Aku Lelaki
  - Miasara (As OST in Papadom)
  - Gadis Pilihan Ibu
  - Percaya (As OST in Buli and Buli Balik)
  - Waras (As OST in Buli)
  - Tiada Lagi
  - Tuan Dan Hamba
  - Bukan Cinta (As OST in Los Dan Faun)
  - Sampai Bila
  - Am I Too Late
  - Mangsa Keadaan
  - Disco Dancer
  - Ku Tak Mahu
  - Hingga Ke Akhirnya
  - Reprise

=== Others ===
- Soalnya Hati (duet with Erra Fazira)
- Diva Bermimpi (Themesong of Diva Popular – with Umie Aida, Sheila Rusly & Ezzlynn)
- Baik Punya Cilok (As themesong of Baik Punya Cilok)
- Tanya (As Soundtrack of Sumolah)

== Accolades ==
Year	Award	Category	Title	Result
2001	Malaysia Film Festival	Best Actor	Soal Hati	Won
2004	Malaysia Film Festival	Most Promising Director	Buli	Won
2004	Malaysia Film Festival	Best Original Story	Buli	Won
2004	Malaysia Film Festival	Best Screenplay	Buli	Won
2004	Malaysia Film Festival	Best Actor	Buli	Nominated
2006	Malaysia Film Festival	Best Actor	Buli Balik	Won
2006	Malaysia Film Festival	Best Original Story	Baik Punya Cilok	Won
2006	Malaysia Film Festival	Best Original Theme Song	Baik Punya Cilok	Nominated
2006	Malaysia Film Festival	Best Screenplay	Baik Punya Cilok	Nominated
2006	Malaysia Film Festival	Best Music Score	Baik Punya Cilok	Nominated
2006	Malaysia Film Festival	Best Film Director	Buli Balik	Nominated
2007	Malaysia Film Festival	Best Original Theme Song	"Pacai" from Sumolah	Nominated
2007	Malaysia Film Festival	Best Editor	Sumolah (alongside Faizul Mohd Noh)	Nominated
2007	Malaysia Film Festival	Best Actor	Sumolah	Nominated
2007	Malaysia Film Festival	Best Film Director	Sumolah	Nominated
2007	Malaysia Film Festival	Best Screenplay	Sumolah	Nominated
2009	Malaysia Film Festival	Best Actor	Papadom	Won
2009	Malaysia Film Festival	Best Original Story	Papadom	Won
2009	Malaysia Film Festival	Best Film Director	Papadom	Nominated
2010	Osaka Asian Film Festival	3rd out of 12 Audience Award	Papadom	Won

=== Others ===
- Asian Television Award 1999 – Best Presenter

== Personal life ==
Afdlin Shauki was born and grew up in Johor Bahru, Johor. He is an eldest child among 10 siblings in his family to his parents, Fadzilah Jelani (died 2018) and Aksan Abu Bakar (died 2020).

== Honour ==
- Pahang
  - Knight Companion of the Order of the Crown of Pahang (DIMP) – Dato' (2017)
