= List of Malaysian films of 2006 =

This is a list of Malaysian films produced and released in 2006. Most of the film are produced in the Malay language, but there also a significant number of films that are produced in English, Mandarin, Cantonese, Hokkien and Tamil.

== 2006 ==
=== January – March ===
Opening		Title	Director	Cast	Genre	Notes	Ref.
J A N U A R Y	5	Castello	Badaruddin Azmi	Rosyam Nor, Erra Fazira, Que Haidar, Zain Ruffedge, Liyana Jasmay, Nur Emy Nadia, M. Rajoli, Nasrizal Ngasri, Zack Taipan, Bront Palarae, Erma Fatima, Kamarool Yusof, Prono	Drama / Crime	Nusan Bakti Corporation-Suhan Movies & Trading co-production	
J A N U A R Y	12	The 3rd Generation	CL Hor	Cheng Kam Cheong, Nicholas Teo, I-Fun, Amber Chia, Carmen Soo, Melvin Sia, Paul Khoo	Drama	Blackbox Pictures; Cantonese-, Malay- and English-language film	
J A N U A R Y	26	Buli Balik	Afdlin Shauki	Afdlin Shauki, Hans Isaac, Nasha Aziz, AC Mizal, Umie Aida, Patrick Teoh, Ako Mustapha, Syanie, Sharifah Shahira, Soraya Dean, Harun Salim Bachik, Harith Iskander, Aziz M. Osman, Adibah Noor, Wahid, Riezman Khuzaimi, Ramlah Ram	Comedy / Drama	Grand Brilliance-Vision Works-Tall Order Productions co-production Preceded by Buli (2004)	
F E B R U A R Y	23	Main-Main Cinta	Abdul Razak Mohaideen	Misha Omar, Adam, Dynas Mokhtar, Pierre Andre, Irma Hasmie, Farid Kamil, Saiful Apek, Azean Irdawaty, Vanida Imran, Azlee, M. Rajoli, Siti Elizad	Comedy / Romance	Metrowealth Movies Production	
M A R C H	3	Ethirkaalam	C. Kumaresan	Sri Kumar	Drama / Action	Lotus Five Star AV; Tamil-language film	
M A R C H	9	Persona Non Grata	Syed Azidi Syed Abdul Aziz	Hans Isaac, Erra Fazira, Keegan Kang, Phattarat Sudprasert, Fahrin Ahmad, M. Rajoli, Syanie, Patrick Teoh, Nancie Foo	Drama / Romance	Nizarman-Tall Order Productions; Malay-, English- and Thai-language film	
M A R C H	23	Bujang Senang	Abdul Razak Mohaideen	Saiful Apek, Fasha Sandha, Yassin Yahya, Norlia Ghani, Sharifah Shahirah, Maimunah Ahmad, Irma Hasmie, Nabila Huda, Serina Redzuawan, Maizurah Hamzah, Azza Elite, Aishah Sinclair, Annahita Bakavoli	Comedy / Romance	KSG Pictures	

=== April – June ===
Opening		Title	Director	Cast	Genre	Notes	Ref.
A P R I L	6	Gubra (Anxiety)	Yasmin Ahmad	Sharifah Amani, Adlin Aman Ramlie, Ida Nerina, Harith Iskander, Adibah Noor, Alan Yun Kam Lun, Tan Mei Ling, Thor Kah Hoong, Ng Choo Seong, Namron, Noorkhiriah Ahmad Shapie, Rozie Rashid, Juliana Ibrahim, Khir Rahman	Drama	Chilli Pepper Films Productions-Nusan Bakti Corporation co-production Preceded by Rabun (2003) and Sepet (2005)	
M A Y	4	Man Laksa	Mamat Khalid	Yassin Yahya, Sharifah Aleya, Saiful Apek, Kartina Aziz, Harun Salim Bachik, Zami Ismail, Loloq @ Rosli Khamis, M. Rajoli, Aqasha, Nasrul Suhaimin, Osman Kering, Zahid, Farah, M. Daud Kilau, Fauziah Nawi, Sathiya, Hani Mohsin, Sharifah Shahora, Hasnul Rahmat, Nadia Mustafar	Comedy / Musical	Tayangan Unggul	
M A Y	18	Senario Pemburu Emas Yamashita	Aziz M. Osman	Wahid, Mazlan, Azlee, Ilya Buang, Hamdan, Que Haidar, Nora Danish, Razak Ahmad, Beego, Hani	Action / Comedy	Grand Brilliance; Preceded by Senario The Movie (1999) Senario Lagi (2000), Lagi-Lagi Senario (2001), Lang Buana (2003), Senario XX (2005)	
J U N E	1	Tipah Tertipu The Movie	Ahmad Idham	Azan Ruffedge, Amer Ruffedge, Cat Ruffedge, Hussein Ruffedge, Zain Ruffedge, Adlin Aman Ramlie, Intan Nurladyana	Comedy / Musical	Excellent Pictures	

=== July – September ===
Opening		Title	Director	Cast	Genre	Notes	Ref.
A U G U S T	10	Remp-It	Ahmad Idham	Farid Kamil, Cat Farish, Julia Hana, Zul Huzaimi, Aqasha, Shah Kassim, Khatijah Tan, Wazi Abdul Hamid	Drama / Action	Metrowealth Movies Production	
A U G U S T	24	Gong	Sandosh Kesavan	Jehan Miskin, Fasha Sandha, Elyana, Faizal Yusuf, Sharifah Sofia	Mystery / Horror	Grand Brilliance	
S E P T E M B E R	14	S'kali	Arivind Abraham	Davina Goh, Jayaram Nagaraj, Derek Ong, Zimy Rozan, Angeline Rose, Jason Lo, Yasmin Ahmad	Drama	Perantauan Enterprise-Asa’ad Entertainment Network co-production English-language film	

=== October – December ===
Opening		Title	Director	Cast	Genre	Notes	Ref.
O C T O B E R	24	Bilut	Badaruddin Azmi	Rosyam Nor, Que Haidar, Jericho Rosales, Siti Shahrizah, Ezlynn, Rusdi Ramli, Aqasha, Adlin Aman Ramlie, Bront Palarae, Sofi Jikan, Lisdawati, Celina Khor, Yasmin Hani, Khatijah Abu Hassan	Drama	Mega Wajasinar	
O C T O B E R	24	Diva Popular	Erma Fatima	Umie Aida, Ezlynn, Awie, Azean Irdawaty, Khatijah Tan, Sheila Rusly, Afdlin Shauki, Azwan Ali, Anita Sarawak	Comedy	Amazon Entertainment	
O C T O B E R	26	Rain Dogs	Ho Yuhang	Kuan Choon Wai, Cheung Wing Hong, Liu Wai Hung, Noorkhiriah Ahmad Shapie, Pete Teo, Yasmin Ahmad	Drama	Paperheart-Focus Films co-production Cantonese-language film	
N O V E M B E R	9	Nana Tanjung		Piee, Saiful Apek, Fasha Sandha, Waheeda, Maideen, Sheila Mambo, Jehan Miskin, Ainul Aishah	Romance / Comedy / Family		
N O V E M B E R	16	Salah Bapak	AR Badul	Saiful Apek, Umie Aida, Esma Daniel	Comedy		
N O V E M B E R	23	The Red Kebaya		Vanida Imran, Ramli Hassan, Bob Mercer, Zahim Albakri, Samantha Schubert	Drama		
N O V E M B E R	23	Ciplak			Comedy / Action		
N O V E M B E R	30	Cinta	Kabir Bhatia	Rashidi Ishak, Nanu Baharuddin, Eizlan Yusof, Vanida Imran, Sharifah Amani, Pierre Andre, Que Haidar, Fasha Sandha, Rita Rudaini, Fatimah Abu Bakar, Rahim Razali, Bell Ngasri, Baizura Kahar, Gambit Saifullah, Henzi Andalas	Romance / Drama		
N O V E M B E R	30	Possessed	Bjarne Wong	Amber Chia, Harisu, Alan Yun, Steve Yap, Sharifah Amani	Horror / Mystery	Cantonese-language film	
D E C E M B E R	7	Cicak Man	Yusry Abdul Halim	Saiful Apek, Yusry Abdul Halim, Aznil Nawawi, Fasha Sandha, AC Mizal, Adlin Aman Ramlie	Action / Comedy		
D E C E M B E R	14	Misi 1511		Eja, Rico Tampatty, Zamshuri Ramli, Adlin Aman Ramlie	Action / Comedy		
D E C E M B E R	21	Tentang Bulan	Ahmad Idham	Aedy Ashraf, Erin Malek, Fatin Afifah	Drama / Comedy		
D E C E M B E R	21	Love Conquers All		Coral Ong Li Whei, Jiun Jiun, Stephen Chua Jyh Shyan	Romance		
D E C E M B E R	28	Seed of Darkness			Horror		

=== Unreleased ===
Title	Director	Cast	Genre	Notes	Ref.
Goodbye Boys	Bernard Chauly	Razif Hashim, Jay Eng, Farid Ramlee, David Eng, Nas-T, Tommy Kuan, Peter Khor, Daniel Henry, Lisa Surihani	Drama	Red Films Production; English-language film	
Sweet Dreams	Shunmugam Karuppannan		Drama	Tamil-language film	
The Flowers Beneath My Skin	Kit Ong	Rosheen Fatima, Sean Thong, Jill Moo Eng Lei, Elaine Lim, Davina Goh, Vincent Chui, Jane Chong, Cheryl Lynn, Mira Ariel Ong	Horror / Silent film		

== See also ==
- 2006 in Malaysia
