= 11th Jakarta International Film Festival =

2009 film festival

- Opening film: Sang Pemimpi by Riri Riza
- Closing film: New York, I Love You
- Location: Jakarta, Indonesia
- Founded: 1999
- No. of films: 114
- Festival date: 4–12 December 2009
- Website: jiffest.co.id

Jakarta International Film Festival chronology
- 12th 10th

The 11th Jakarta International Film Festival was a film festival held in Jakarta, Indonesia, from 4 to 12 December 2009.

== Description ==
The 11th edition of the Jakarta International Film Festival was held from 4 to 12 December 2009.

Riri Riza's Sang Pemimpi marks the first Indonesian film to open the festival. The festival was closed by anthology film New York, I Love You. A total of 114 films from 24 countries were screened during the festival.

The festival collaborated with Madani Film Festival to showcase Islamic-themed films.

== Ban ==
The film Balibo, directed by Australian director Robert Connolly, about a group of Australian and British journalists known as the Balibo Five who were killed by Indonesian forces ahead of the invasion of East Timor, was to have premiered at the festival. However, in advance of a private screening, the film was banned by the Indonesian Film Censorship Agency. Indonesian Foreign Minister Marty Natalegawa said the ban was to avoid a negative "global perception of Indonesia". The Indonesian military supported the ban, with a spokesman saying the film could harm Indonesia's relations with Timor Leste and Australia. He also repeated the official version of events, namely that the journalists were killed in a crossfire, and not by Indonesian troops.

== Official selection ==
=== Opening and closing films ===
English title	Original title	Director(s)	Production countrie(s)
Sang Pemimpi (opening film)		Riri Riza	Indonesia
New York, I Love You (closing film)		Various: Fatih Akin; Yvan Attal; Allen Hughes; Shunji Iwai; Jiang Wen; Joshua Marston; Mira Nair; Natalie Portman; Brett Ratner; Randall Balsmeyer; Shekhar Kapur	France, United States

=== Indonesian Feature ===
English title	Original title	Director(s)
3 Wishes 3 Loves	3 Doa 3 Cinta	Nurman Hakim
The Anniversary Gift	Kado Hari Jadi	Paul Agusta
Blind Pig Who Wants to Fly	Babi Buta Yang Ingin Terbang	Edwin
The Forbidden Door	Pintu Terlarang	Joko Anwar
Fugu		Faozan Rizal
Garuda In My Heart	Garuda di Dadaku	Ifa Isfansyah
Get Married 2		Hanung Bramantyo
God Is a Director	Cin(t)a	Sammaria Simanjuntak
Identity	Identitas	Aria Kusumadewa
Jermal		Ravi Bharwani, Rayya Makarim, Utawa Tresno
King		Ari Sihasale
Merantau		Gareth Evans
Not An Ordinary Love	Bukan Cinta Biasa	Benni Setiawan
Romeo Juliet		Andibachtiar Yusuf
Sacred	Keramat	Monty Tiwa
Under the Tree		Garin Nugroho

=== World Cinema ===
English title	Original title	Director(s)	Production countrie(s)
500 Days of Summer		Marc Webb	United States
Applause	Applaus	Martin Pieter Zandvliet	Denmark
Calimucho		Eugenie Jansen	Netherlands
Chiko		Özgür Yıldırım	Germany
Coco Before Chanel	Coco Avant Chanel	Anne Fontaine	France, Belgium
The Damned United		Tom Hooper	United Kingdom
Departures	おくりびと	Yōjirō Takita	Japan
Everlasting Moments	Maria Larssons eviga ögonblick	Jan Troell	Sweden, Denmark, Finland, Norway, Germany
The Headless Woman	La mujer sin cabeza	Lucrecia Martel	Argentina
Home		Ursula Meier	Switzerland, France, Belgium
Jerichow		Christian Petzold	Germany
Little Soldier	Lille soldat	Annette K. Olesen	Denmark
Love and Rage	Vanvittig forelsket	Morten Giese	Denmark
Mammoth		Lukas Moodysson	Sweden, Denmark, Germany
Max & Co		Frédéric Guillaume, Samuel Guillaume	Switzerland
North	Nord	Rune Denstad Langlo	Norway
Terribly Happy	Frygtelig lykkelig	Henrik Ruben Genz	Denmark
Three Monkeys	Üç Maymun	Nuri Bilge Ceylan	Turkey
Troubled Water	De usynlige	Erik Poppe	Norway
Winter Silence	Winterstilte	Sonja Wyss	Netherlands

=== World Feature: Documentary ===
English title	Original title	Director(s)	Production countrie(s)
Around the World with Joseph Stiglitz	Le Monde Selon Stiglitz	Jacques Sarasin	France
The Beaches of Agnès	Les plages d'Agnès	Agnès Varda	France
Bilal		Sourav Sarangi	India
Hold Me Tight, Let Me Go		Kim Longinotto	United Kingdom
Love the Beast		Eric Bana	Australia
Soundtrack for a Revolution		Bill Guttentag, Dan Sturman	United States, France, United Kingdom

=== A View from the SEA ===
English title	Original title	Director(s)	Production countrie(s)
15Malaysia		Various: Yasmin Ahmad; Khairil M. Bahar; Tan Chui Mui; Linus Chung; Yuhang Ho; Johan John; James Lee; Amir Muhammad; Namron; Desmond Ng; Kamal Sabran; Liew Seng Tat; Mussadique Suleiman	Malaysia
Adela		Adolfo Alix Jr.	Philippines
At the End of Daybreak	心魔	Ho Yuhang	South Korea, Malaysia, Hong Kong
Burma VJ	Burma VJ - reporter i et lukket land	Anders Østergaard	Denmark
Citizen Juling	Polamuang Juling	Ing K, Manit Sriwanichpoom, Kraisak Choonhavan	Thailand
Here		Ho Tzu Nyen	Singapore
Legend Is Alive	Huyền Thoại Bất Tử	Luu Huynh	Vietnam
Malaysian Gods		Amir Muhammad	Malaysia
Manila		Adolfo Alix Jr., Raya Martin	Philippines
Sawasdee Bangkok		Various: Bhandit Rittakol; Wisit Sasanatieng; Prachya Pinkaew; Rutaiwan Wongsirasawad; Pen-Ek Ratanaruang; Aditya Assarat; Santi Taepanich; Chookiat Sakveerakul; Kongdej Jaturanrasamee	Thailand
Talentime		Yasmin Ahmad	Malaysia
When the Full Moon Rises	Kala Malam Bulan Mengambang	Mamat Khalid	Malaysia

=== Madani Film Festival ===
English title	Original title	Director(s)	Production countrie(s)
The 10 Conditions of Love		Jeff Daniels	United States, Australia
99% Honest	99% ærlig	Rune Denstad Langlo	Norway
Adhen	Dernier Maquis	Rabah Ameur-Zaïmeche	France
A Dream for Kabul		Phillippe Baylaucq	Canada
Letters to the President		Petr Lom	Iran
On a Tightrope		Petr Lom	Canada, Norway
A Road to Mecca - The Journey of Muhammad Asad	Der Weg nach Mekka - Die Reise des Muhammad Asad	Georg Misch	Austria
You Cannot Hide from Allah		Petr Lom	South Africa, Germany

=== Tribute to Yasmin Ahmad ===
- Rabun (2003)
- Sepet (2004)
- Gubra (2006)
- Muallaf (2008)
- Talentime (2009)

== Controversies ==
Lembaga Sensor Film (Film Censorship Board) banned the screenings of Balibo, a film about the Balibo Five, a group of journalists who were captured and killed while reporting on activities just prior to the Indonesian invasion of East Timor of 1975. The head of LSF, Muchlis Paeni, stated that the film discredited Indonesia.
