= Rabun =

2003 television film

- Directed by: Yasmin Ahmad
- Starring: M. Rajoli; Kartina Aziz; Noor Khiriah; Irwan Iskandar; Hafiz Ibrahim; Ho Yuhang
- Country of origin: Malaysia
- Original languages: English, Malay, Cantonese

Production
- Producers: Rosnah Kassim; Lazizah Ahmad; Mazlan Abd Latiff

Original release
- Release: 11 April 2003 (Singapore)
- Release: 24 January 2004 (Malaysia)

Rabun (English: My Failing Eyesight) is a 2003 Malaysian Malay-language romantic drama film directed by Yasmin Ahmad. It tells a story about a free-spirited older couple, Pak Atan and Mak Inom who decide to spend more time in the country after getting tired of city life. But they find that life in the old village isn't a good thing when they get cheated by a distant relative, Yem, out of some money. They cut him off and Yem plots revenge. Meanwhile, in the city, the couple's daughter Orked is being wooed by a young gentleman, Yasin. Rabun is Yasmin Ahmad's first film before her other films, Sepet, Gubra, Mukhsin, Muallaf and Talentime.

== Premise ==
The story revolves on Orked who lives with her parents, Pak Atan and Mak Inom and having a feast between them.
