= Muallaf =

2008 film by Yasmin Ahmad

- Muallaf Singapore poster
- Directed by: Yasmin Ahmad
- Produced by: Rosnah Kassim
- Starring: Brian Yap; Sharifah Amani; Yeo Yann Yann; Sharifah Aleysha
- Distributed by: MHZ Film Sdn. Bhd. (Malaysia); The Picturehouse (Singapore)
- Release dates: 27 November 2008 (Singapore); 24 December 2009 (Malaysia)
- Country: Malaysia
- Languages: English; Malay; Cantonese
- Budget: MYR 1.3 million
- Box office: MYR 190,000

Muallaf (English: The Convert) is a 2008 Malaysian Malay-language drama film directed by Yasmin Ahmad. It tells a tale of three souls finding solace in religion. This is Yasmin Ahmad's fifth film after Rabun, Sepet, Gubra and Mukhsin.

== Cast ==
- Brian Yap as Brian Goh, a history teacher at Rohana's school^{1}
- Sharifah Amani as Rohani
- Sharifah Aleysha as Rohana
- Rahim Razali as Datuk, father of the two siblings
- Ning Baizura as Datin, mother of the two siblings
- Tony Savarimuthu as Bro. Anthony, Catholic priest and Principal of Rohana's school
- Hazel Fernandez as Mrs Siva, Rohana's Arts teacher
- Yeo Yann Yann as Cindy, Rohani's colleague at Sid's Tavern Pub & Cafe
- Tan Mei Ling as Mrs Goh, Brian's mother
- Ho Yuhang as Datuk's private investigator
- Haris Zakaria as Little Brian
- Shana Shafiza Muzaffar Shah as Mei Ling

Footnote:

- ^1 Brian Yap's character was initially planned to be named Robert Ng.

== Production ==
The film was financed by an elderly Chinese businessman who was impressed by her previous film and invested in Muallaf to encourage her to continue to produce films.

Michael Wong was the original casting choice for Brian Goh but Wong was unable to commit to the film schedule in Malaysia due to him being required to stay in Taiwan.

== Release ==
As Yasmin's previous films, Muallaf opened with the usual Islamic verse Bismillahirahmanirrahim ("In the name of God, the most Gracious and most Merciful"). What set Muallaf apart from her previous works was that the verse was displayed in Chinese in this movie, i.e. "奉大仁大慈真主的尊名" (Pinyin: fèng dà rén dà cí Zhēn Zhǔ de zūn míng). It was understood that the verse would be displayed in Tamil in her next film, Talentime.

As Yasmin's second feature film, Sepet, Muallaf was first screened in Singapore instead of Malaysia, where it was shot. The film ran for 4 weeks in Singapore from 27 November to 24 December 2008, recording turnouts more than that of Sepet. Muallaf was first denied screening in Malaysian cinemas due to the Malaysian censorship authorities request of key scenes to be cut, thus rendering the story meaningless. However, one year later, Muallaf finally opened in Malaysia nationwide on 24/12/09 with a few dialogues muted.

== Accolades ==
=== Awards won ===
- 21st Tokyo International Film Festival (18 - 26 October 2008) ~ Special Mention Best Asian-Middle Eastern Film
- 2010 Screen Awards - Best Film & Best Actress in a Leading Role (Sharifah Amani)

=== Official selection ===
- 61st Locarno International Film Festival (6 - 16 August 2008)
- 13th Pusan International Film Festival (2 - 10 October 2008)
- Rialto Film Festival, Amsterdam - New Malaysian Cinema
