= 12th Jakarta International Film Festival =

2010 film festival

- Opening film: Waiting for "Superman" by Davis Guggenheim
- Closing film: Biutiful by Alejandro González Iñárritu
- Location: Jakarta, Indonesia
- Founded: 1999
- No. of films: 91
- Festival date: 25 November–5 December 2010

Jakarta International Film Festival chronology
- 11th

The 12th Jakarta International Film Festival took place from 25 November to 5 December 2010. It opened with documentary film Waiting for "Superman" by Davis Guggenheim and closed with Alejandro González Iñárritu's psychological drama Biutiful. In October 2010, it was reported that the festival was at risk of being cancelled due to a lack of funding. In response, the festival organizers launched a public fundraising campaign to secure the event's continuation. The initiative proved successful when Finnish telecommunications corporation Nokia agreed to become one of the sponsors. A total of 91 films from 33 countries were screened during the festival.

== Official selection ==
=== Opening and closing films ===
English title	Original title	Director(s)	Production countrie(s)
Waiting for "Superman" (opening film)		Davis Guggenheim	United States
Biutiful (closing film)		Alejandro González Iñárritu	Mexico, Spain

=== Special Premiere ===
English title	Original title	Director(s)	Production countrie(s)
Belkibolang		Various: Agung Sentausa; Ifa Isfansyah; Tumpal Tampubolon; Rico Marpaung; Anggun Priambodo; Azhar Lubis; Wisnu Surya Pratama; Edwin; Sidi Saleh	Indonesia
Diujung Jalan		Tony Trimarsanto	Indonesia
HipHopDiningrat		Muhammad Marzuki, Chandra Hutagaol	Indonesia
Jakarta Twilight	Jakarta Maghrib	Salman Aristo	Indonesia
KickStart! – Palu		Various: Dewi Yanti; Nur Soima Ulfa; Nurhuda; Wahdania; Syafaat Ladanu	Indonesia
Working Girls	Perempuan Pencari Nafkah	Various: Sammaria Simanjuntak; Sally Anom Sari; Yosep Anggi Noen; Nitta Nazyra C. Noer; Daud Sumolang	Indonesia

=== World Cinema ===
English title	Original title	Director(s)	Production countrie(s)
Asleep in the Sun	Dormir al sol	Alejandro Chomski	Argentina
For 80 Days	80 egunean	Jon Garaño, José María Goenaga	Spain
Honey	Bal	Semih Kaplanoğlu	Turkey, Germany
Incendies		Denis Villeneuve	Canada
Joy		Mijke de Jong	Netherlands
Outrage	アウトレイジ	Takeshi Kitano	Japan
Scott Pilgrim vs. the World		Edgar Wright	United States, United Kingdom, Canada
Son of Babylon	ابن بابل	Mohamed Al-Daradji	Iraq, United Kingdom, France, Netherlands, United Arab Emirates, Egypt, Palestine
Soul Boy		Hawa Essuman	Kenya, Germany
The Storm in My Heart	Jernanger	Pål Jackman	Norway
Together	Sammen	Matias Armand Jordal	Norway
Turk's Head	Tête de turc	Pascal Elbé	France
The Wedding Photographer	Bröllopsfotografen	Ulf Malmros	Sweden
When We Leave	Die Fremde	Feo Aladag	Germany
Documentary
Armadillo		Janus Metz Pedersen	Denmark
Bhutto		Duane Baughman, Johnny O'Hara	United States, United Kingdom
Budrus		Julia Bacha	Palestine, United States
A Good Man		Safina Uberoi	Australia
Space Tourists		Christian Frei	Switzerland

=== A View from the SEA ===
English title	Original title	Director(s)	Production countrie(s)
The Blue Mansion		Glen Goei	Singapore
Don't Burn	Đừng Đốt	Đặng Nhật Minh	Vietnam
Forever		Wee Li Lin	Singapore
Pinoy Sunday		Wi Ding Ho	Taiwan, Philippines
The Tiger Factory		Woo Ming Jin	Japan, Malaysia
Uncle Boonmee Who Can Recall His Past Lives	ลุงบุญมีระลึกชาติ	Apichatpong Weerasethakul	Thailand, United Kingdom, France, Germany, Spain, Netherlands
Ways of the Sea	Halaw	Sheron Dayoc	Philippines

=== Indonesian Feature Film Competition ===
English title	Original title	Director(s)
3 Hearts 2 Worlds 1 Love	3 Hati Dua Dunia, Satu Cinta	Benni Setiawan
The Dreamer	Sang Pemimpi	Riri Riza
Emak Longs for Hajj	Emak Ingin Naik Haji	Aditya Gumay
The Enlightener	Sang Pencerah	Hanung Bramantyo
How Funny (This Country Is)	Alangkah Lucunya (Negeri Ini)	Deddy Mizwar
Macabre	Rumah Dara	The Mo Brothers
My Motherland	Tanah Air Beta	Ari Sihasale
Sunday Morning in Victoria Park	Minggu Pagi di Victoria Park	Lola Amaria

== Awards ==
=== Indonesian Feature Film Competition ===
The following awards were presented at the festival:

- Best Film: How Funny (This Country Is) by Deddy Mizwar
- Special Jury Prize: The Enlightener by Hanung Bramantyo
- Best Director: Lola Amaria for Sunday Morning in Victoria Park
- Audience Award: Macabre by The Mo Brothers
