= Jangan Ketawa =

Malaysian sketch comedy series

- Genre: Sketch comedy
- Created by: Linda Chong
- Directed by: Linda Chong, Harith Iskandar
- Starring: Dee, Moon, Rambo Chin, Harith Iskandar, Sri Shan, Ghanie, Rama, Robin, Robert, Danny
- Country of origin: Malaysia
- Original languages: Malay, English, Mandarin and Tamil

Production
- Producer: Filem Karya Nusa
- Production location: Malaysia
- Running time: Approx. 30 minutes
- Production company: Filem Karya Nusa

Original release
- Network: TV3
- Release: 1991 – 2005

Jangan Ketawa is a Malaysian sketch comedy television series that first aired in the early 1990s. The show is widely recognized for its unique portrayal of Malaysian multiculturalism, its cast from various ethnicities, and its use of multiple languages in its sketches. "Jangan Ketawa" gained national recognition because it shows normal Malaysian life through humor which made it a standout example of Malaysian television comedy.

== History and Production ==
The show was produced by Filem Karya Nusa and initially broadcast on TV3 beginning in 1991. Created and co-directed by the late Linda Chong, with direction support from Harith Iskandar, each episode featured a series of short comedic sketches centered on everyday Malaysian scenarios. The multicultural cast regularly performed in Malay, English, Mandarin and Tamil, providing representation and humor relatable to the country's diverse audiences.

Reruns aired on Astro Prima from 2003 to 2005, as well as on Astro Warna in 2009, allowing new audiences to rediscover its themes and comedic stylings

== Characters ==
- Dee (Syed Muradzi Syed Shamsul)
- Moon (Syeikh Munir)
- Rambo Chin (Chin Kia Shin)
- Harith Iskandar (Harith Iskander Musa)
- Sri Shan (Dr. Sri Shanmuganathan)
- Ghanie (Abd Ghani Ahmad)
- Rama (Ramasundran Rengan)
- Robert (Robert Kong)
- Robin (Robin Kong)
- Danny (Danny Kong)

== Cultural Significance ==
Jangan Ketawa is widely regarded as a true reflection of Malaysia’s multicultural society, blending ethnic diversity, popular vernaculars, and everyday experiences. Its multilingual and multiethnic cast made it relatable to Malaysians of all backgrounds. The program maintains its popularity through ongoing social media discussions and viral video content which continues to circulate. The show is often cited in retrospectives of the best Malaysian sitcoms from the 1990s, alongside series like Spanar Jaya, Pi Mai Pi Mai Tang Tu, and Rumah Kedai.

== Notable Sketches ==
One of the most iconic sketches, Pil Puasa, features the characters humorously introducing a 'magic fasting pill' that supposedly allows Muslims to fast without hunger or thirst. The sketch has become a fan favorite which people share on social media every Ramadan to watch one of Malaysian television's most memorable comedic scenes.

According to Dee, the hairstylist-turned-comedian from Kangar, Perlis. 'Pil Puasa' was inspired by the exhaustion of filming during fasting month and improvised ideas among cast members, showing how much of the show's humor was rooted in Malaysian lived experience.

== Legacy ==
Jangan Ketawa established its historical significance through repeated airings which maintained its cultural importance in the present time. The show created a new standard for Malaysian sketch comedy which motivated future comic actors and television producers to follow its lead.

One of the cast member Moon (Syeikh Munir Syeikh Mahmud), died after suffering a stroke while staying at his uncle's house during Hari Raya in 2005. Moon was buried at the Orang Muslim cemetery. He leaves behind an adopted daughter, Fatin Nadia Abdullah.

Robert Kong has also died and a fun facts is Robin and Danny from the same show are his blood brothers.

In 2021, Rama (Ramasundran Rengan), another beloved member of the cast, who was celebrated for his multilingual acting and direction in over 500 dramas, died at age 57 due to heart complications. His death was mourned across the entertainment industry, underlining the show's lasting impact.
