= Kahoe Hon =

Malaysian actor

- Born: Howard Hon Ka Hoe; March 24, 1992 (age 34); Kuala Lumpur, Malaysia
- Education: New York Film Academy
- Occupation: Actor
- Years active: 2008–present

Howard Hon Ka Hoe (born March 24, 1992), also known as Kahoe Hon, is a Malaysian actor. On 2009, he start his theatrical debut as the important side character named Kahoe on the last work of Yasmin Ahmad titled Talentime (2009). He became the protagonist as Adam Wan in widely recognized Malaysian film, Crayon (2010).

After his success in Malaysia, he went to the United States and studied at the New York Film Academy for 7 years. In 2017, he returned to his homeland and started over mainly as a stuntman and in small-time roles. His notable appearances in recent years were in the Malaysian Mandarin language film, Victim(s) as Gang Zi in 2020 and as Ivan, one of the Singaporean Vengeance crew members in Soloz: Game of Life (2025).

== Filmography ==
=== Film ===
| Year | Title | Character | Note |
|---|---|---|---|
| 2009 | Talentime | Kahoe | Debut |
| 2009 | 15Malaysia | | |
| 2010 | Crayon | Adam Wan | Arguably his peak career |
| 2017 | We, the Dead | Wei | |
| 2019 | Rise to Power: KLGU | Danny | |
| 2021 | Sa Balik Baju | | |
| 2023 | Irama Kita | Alvin | |
| 2023 | War On Terror: KL Anarki | Bob | |
| 2025 | Soloz: Game of Life | Ivan | |
| 2025 | Badak | Jay | |

=== Drama ===
| Year | Title | Character | TV Channel | Note |
|---|---|---|---|---|
| 2017 | Anak Merdeka | | Astro Prima | 2 episode |
| 2019 | Senafas Rindu | Kelvin | Astro Ria | |
| 2021 | Sitik Tok | Xander | TV3 | |
| 2021 | Malaysian Ghost Stories | Gary | Astro Ria | Episode: "Sumpahan Abu Mayat" |
| 2021–2022 | Dukun Diva | Daniel Lim | Astro Citra | |
| 2022 | Kuasa | James Too | Astro Citra | |
| 2023 | Projek: High Council | Jayden | Astro Ria | |
| 2024 | Framed | Ka Hong | Astro Premier | |
| 2024 | Bercakap Dengan Jun | Luth | Astro Ria | |
