= Zombitopia =

- Directed by: Woo Ming Jin
- Written by: Woo Ming Jin; Neesa Jamal
- Produced by: Woo Ming Jin; Aron Koh; Lim Ying Xian
- Starring: Shaheizy Sam; Elvina Mohamad; Bront Palarae; Azman Hassan; Sharifah Amani
- Cinematography: Lesly Leon Lee
- Edited by: Woo Ming Jin; Yap Xhian Way; Edmund Yeo
- Music by: Chapavich Temnitikul; Wuttipon Phumcokrak
- Production companies: Greenlight Pictures; Sunstrong Entertainment; Lomo Pictures
- Distributed by: Disney+ Hotstar (co-distributed with Skop Productions)
- Release date: 2 July 2021 (Malaysia)
- Running time: 90 minutes
- Country: Malaysia
- Language: Malay
- Budget: MYR 3 million

Zombitopia or known as Zombietopia is a 2021 Malaysian Malay-language post-apocalyptic action horror film directed by Woo Ming Jin along written by himself with Neesa Jamal, starring Shaheizy Sam, Elvina Mohamad, Bront Palarae, Azman Hassan and Sharifah Amani. The film revolves around a mysterious virus that causes infected humans to act violently, causing a zombie apocalypse.

With the film being licensed with Skop Productions, the film was originally scheduled for released on 13 February 2020 but postponed due to the coronavirus pandemic. However, the film released exclusively on Disney+ Hotstar on 2 July 2021.

== Plot ==
About 15 years ago, a virus attacked humans, causing those infected to act violently. Zidik awoke to find his sister attacking their mother, while their father sacrificed himself, allowing Zidik to escape.

Afterwards, Zidik was raised in an orphanage run by the cruel Kak Lily. There, he befriended another orphan named Zooey. One day, Zidik was expelled from the orphanage for disobeying Aunt Lily's orders, and after that, he never saw Zooey again.

As Zidik grew up, he worked with Hassan, who had taken him in after discovering him living alone on the streets. Both men remain trapped in the past: Hassan cannot accept the loss of his wife to the virus and often forgets that she is dead, while Zidik clings to his memories of Zooey.

Meanwhile, Dr. Rahman, consumed by a desire for revenge, has created a new strain of the zombie virus, intending to plunge the world back into chaos. Zidik and Hassan find themselves caught in the unfolding turmoil of the second wave of the zombie outbreak. What will happen next?

== Cast ==
- Shaheizy Sam as Zidik
- Elvina Mohamad as Zooey
- Bront Palarae as Dr. Rahman
- Nur Shahidah as Siti
- Azman Hassan as Hassan
- Sharifah Amani as Maya
- Idan Aedan as Zidik kecil
- Amanda Amry as Zooey kecil
- Ruzana Ibrahim as Kak Lily
- Eqy Afandi as Jamal
- Kazar Razak as Mika
- Nu'Man Salleh as Bob
- Jay Iswazir as Kamarul
- Ken Abdullah as Bentong Khan
- Michael Leong Chee Wah as Yuri
- Steve Yap as Lee Boon Kit
- Dania Erisha as Kiki
- Danny Low as Mustapha

== Release ==
This film was initially scheduled for release in the local cinemas on 13 February 2020, which is one month before the COVID-19 pandemic begin in the country, but postponed then until the new date announced. Over a year later, the film was released with the exclusive premiere as Hotstar Originals on Disney+ Hotstar on 2 July 2021. An official trailer of the film spotted on Skop Productions YouTube channel on 21 January 2020 and on Disney+ Hotstar Malaysia YouTube channel on 4 May 2021.
