= Till Death: Azalea's Wrath =

2019 Malaysian Malay-language horror film

- Directed by: Sein Qudsi
- Written by: Sein Qudsi
- Produced by: Sein Qudsi
- Starring: Khir Rahman; Vanidah Imran; Nam Ron
- Distributed by: Netflix
- Release date: August 8, 2019
- Running time: 105 minutes
- Country: Malaysia
- Language: Malay

Till Death: Azalea's Wrath or Dendam Azalea is a 2019 Malaysian Malay-language horror film written, directed and produced by Sein Qudsi starring Khir Rahman, Vanida Imran and Nam Ron . In the film, after losing their baby during childbirth, a couple moves to a new house with their adopted son, but the house holds dark secrets. It is released by Netflix on 8 August 2019. It is the first Malaysian film to be released exclusively by Netflix without releasing first in cinemas.

== Synopsis ==
A couple Suraya and Azman had just lost their baby due to complications during childbirth. Wanting to start afresh, the couple adopted a little boy and moved their family into a new house. Little do they know, the house carries a dark secret and a vengeful spirit is seeking justice for her undue death. Meanwhile, a robber experiences the same dark omens.

== Cast ==
- Vanidah Imran as Suraya
- Khir Rahman as Azman
- Nam Ron as Shahidan
- Kodi Rasheed as Samad
- Zain Hamid as Inspector Bakri
- Muhammad Hairul Redzuan as Amar
- Zulaika Zahary as Azalea
- Dilla Ahmad as Dr. Serina
- Khaty Azean as Puan Kamsiah
- Sharisa Haris as Agent Hartanah
- Yusran Hashim as Yusman
- Zarynn Min as Mas
- Rahhim Omar as ACP Rahman
