= Kampung Bukit Treh =

Village in Muar District, Johor, Malaysia

Coordinates: 2°05′02.9″N 102°34′42.8″E

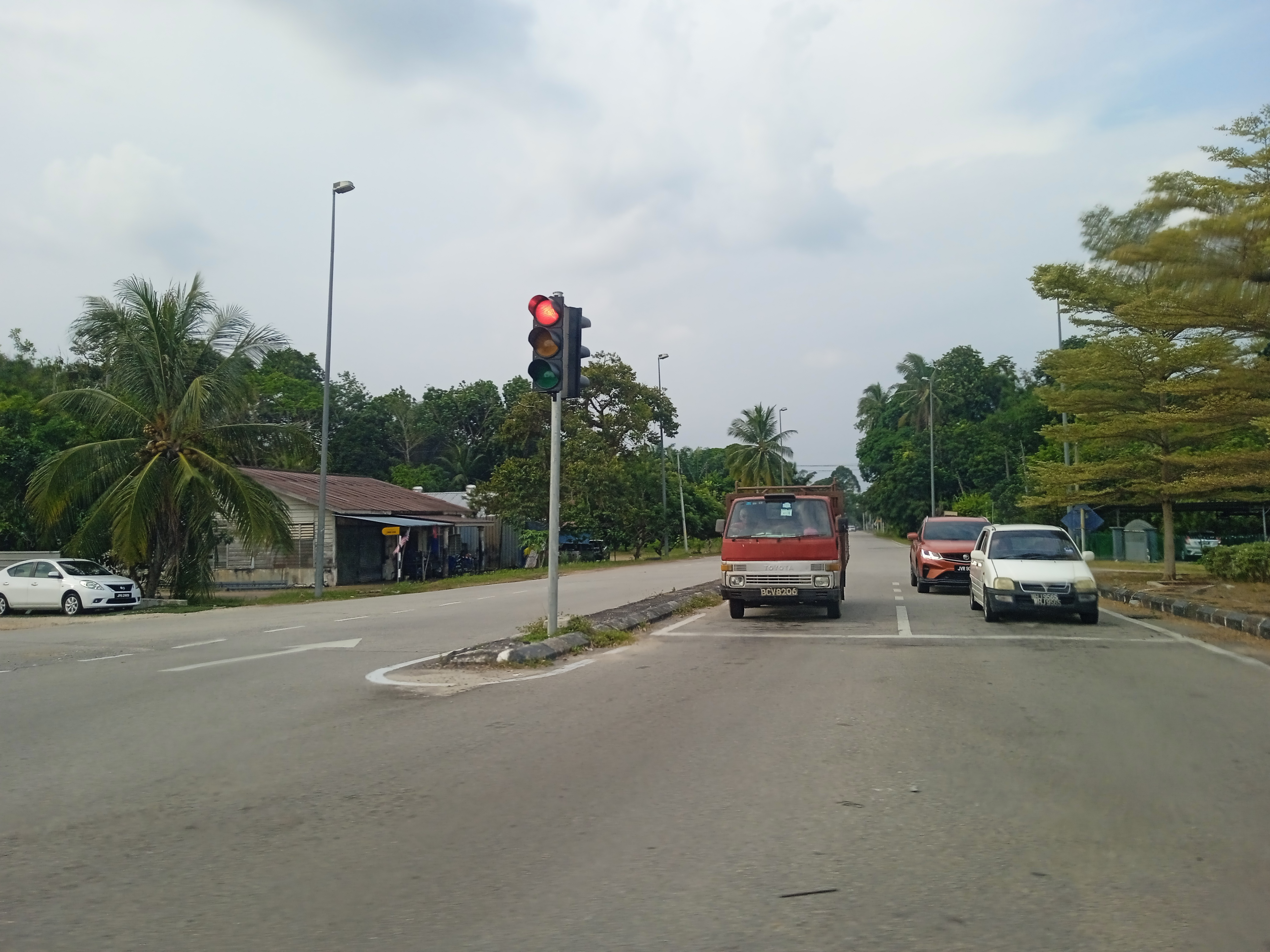
Kampung Bukit Treh

Kampung Bukit Treh is a small village in Muar District, Johor, Malaysia.

The film director Yasmin Ahmad was born in the village.
