= Magika =

- Film poster
- Directed by: Edry Abdul Halim
- Written by: Edry Abdul Halim
- Produced by: Yusry Abdul Halim; Norman Abdul Halim; Edry Abdul Halim
- Starring: Diana Danielle; Mawi; Fimie Don
- Cinematography: Azlan Taharuddin
- Music by: Mohd Mohsin
- Production company: KRU Studios
- Distributed by: KRU Studios
- Release date: 23 September 2010 (Malaysia)
- Running time: 94 minutes
- Country: Malaysia
- Language: Malay
- Budget: MYR 2.40 million
- Box office: MYR 3.14 million

Magika is a 2010 Malaysian Malay-language musical adventure fantasy film directed by Edry Abdul Halim starring Diana Danielle, Mawi and Fimie Don.

== Plot ==
Ayu and Malik, two siblings are going through their darkest moments of lives when their beloved mother just died. Malik feels so depressed believing that he was the main cause of his mother's death. During one of the evenings after a fight with his sister, Malik left to take a stroll in the forest. On and on he went until he realised he was lost and the next very moment, he appeared in another dimension called Magika.

Not only had he gotten himself lost, he was captured by a Nenek Kebayan and her follower, Awang Kenit. He is now subjected to be used as an experiment by the Nenek Kebayan to produce Essence of Youth made of human child's tears. Upon hearing Malik's cries for help, Ayu rushed to help her brother and she too is sucked in the Magika mystical land.

Ayu had to undergo various types of challenges and obstacles to find and save her brother in her journey in the Magika world. And so begins the encounters of both the siblings with famous Malay heroes and myths such as Badang, Dragon of Chini Lake, Nenek Kebayan, Puteri Bunian, Pak Pandir, Hang Tuah and the Warriors of Malacca, Mount Ledang Princess, Bawang Putih, all of whom communicate with each other in song.

== Cast ==
- Diana Danielle as Ayu
- Mawi as Badang
- Fimie Don as Malik
- Ziana Zain as Nenek Kebayan
- Mohd Afiq Fikri as Awang Kenit
- Ning Baizura as Princess of Mount Ledang
- Maya Karin as Goblins
- Raja Azura as Mak Andeh
- Norman Abdul Halim, Yusry Abdul Halim & Edry Abdul Halim as Sibling Trees
- Aznil Nawawi as Pak Pandir
- M. Nasir as the Chini Lake dragon
- Jalaluddin Hassan as Murad
- Ogy Ahmad Daud as Ija
- Sharifah Amani as Bawang Putih
- Sharifah Aleya as Bawang Merah
- Adibah Noor as Makcik Halia
- Ruminah Sidek as Tok Wan
- Sabri Yunus as the Minister
- Saiful Apek as Hang Tuah
- Lan Pet Pet as Hang Jebat
- Azlee Jaafar as Hang Kasturi
- Hamdan Ramli as Hang Lekir
- Ilya Buang as Hang Lekiu
- Vanida Imran as Mahsuri
- Norman Hakim as Awang Lembing
- Nabil Ahmad as Oil Man
- Zaibo as Pak Belalang
- Hadziq as Belalang
- Marsha Milan Londoh as Princess Santubong
- Azhari Zain as the Doctor
