= Crayon (film) =

- Crayon theatrical poster
- Directed by: Dean A. Burhanuddin
- Written by: Dean A. Burhanuddin
- Produced by: Dean A. Burhanuddin; Linda Ziegler; Elise A. Hamid
- Starring: Kahoe Howard Hon; Faisal Abdullah; Adibah Noor; Joshry Adamme
- Cinematography: Eric Oh
- Music by: Pacai
- Production company: ZiOSS Films
- Distributed by: ZiOSS Films
- Release date: 11 November 2010
- Running time: 85 minutes
- Country: Malaysia
- Languages: English; Malay; Chinese; Tamil
- Budget: RM 1.31 million ($405,760)
- Box office: RM 53,000 ($16,416)

Crayon (also referred to as Crayon the Movie) is a 2010 Malaysian Malay-language independent drama film. Written and directed by Dean A. Burhanuddin, it stars Edward Hon Kahoe, Faisal Abdullah, Adibah Noor and Joshry Adamme. Its producers are Dean A. Burhanuddin, Linda Ziegler and Elise A. Hamid.

Inspired by true events, the film portrays two university students who volunteer for a social program to help orphans in the east coast of Malaysia during their semester holidays. However, the land they are visiting are reclaimed by land developers for their own purposes. A charity concert is held in their effort to help more, but the orphanage gets burnt down. This startling turn of events causes doubt to their new sense of purpose, and forces them to test their adversity.

== Cast ==
- Kahoe Howard Hon as Adam Wan, a Chinese Malaysian scholar.
- Faisal Abdullah as Rafaat, Malay Singaporean IT genius.
- Joshry Adamme as Afiq, one of the most rambunctious and loved orphan whose sense of adventure gives them a new living appreciation.
- Adibah Noor as Mak Engku, the local orphanage's caring and lovely matron

== Production ==
=== Development ===
Dean wrote the script in September 2009, as he realised that life has a greater meaning when helping others. The loss of his father in 2009 changed him that to help others we must not only think of the Malaysian people all the time.

The entire process took 1 year where the team had a very short pre-production of 3 months followed by a month of shoot and lastly 6 months of post production. The locations of filming were in Kuala Lumpur, Malacca and Singapore.

== Release ==
Crayon was scheduled to be released in Malaysia on 11 November 2010. It is also slated to premiere in Laemmle Theatres, West Hollywood, Los Angeles, California for a 7-day run for 4 November 2010. This makes the first Malaysian film ever to be released in the United States. It made its premiere screening at e@Curve, Mutiara Damansara, on 17 September 2010.

== Reception ==
=== Accolades ===
Crayon was eligible for the 83rd Academy Awards nominations listed in early January 2011 and was competing with 248 other films in all categories except the Foreign film category.

== Sequels ==
Burhanuddin has stated that his first film revolves around orphans, the second film will focus on people with disabilities, whereas the third and last will focus on the elderly. With his films, he intends to bring awareness to the adversity that these groups face and how they overcome them.
