= Kolumpo (film) =

- Directed by: Sheikh Munasar, Bront Palarae, Rozi Izma
- Written by: Sheikh Munasar, Bront Palarae, Rozi Izma
- Produced by: Sheikh Munasar, James Wong, Bront Palarae, Rozi Izma
- Starring: Sharifah Amani; Azad Jasmin; Nell Ng; Ruminah Sidek; Soffi Jikan; Amirul Ariff; Mano Maniam
- Edited by: Mirage Post
- Release date: 5 December 2013 (Malaysia)
- Country: Malaysia
- Languages: Malay, English
- Budget: MYR 1 million ($308,928)
- Box office: MYR 290,000 ($89,598)

Kolumpo is a Malaysian Malay-language anthology film release in 2013. It is a collection of three multilingual short stories directed by Bront Palarae, Sheikh Munasar, and Rozi Izma. The film is produced by the directors alongside associate producer James Wong under the production company Otto Films SDN BHD.

The film is set in Kuala Lumpur.

The cast includes Sharifah Amani, Azad Jasmin, Ruminah Sidek, Nell Ng, Mano Maniam, Soffi Jikan, Sabri Yunus, Sherry Alhadad, Along Eyzandy, Radhi Khalid and Emely Poon.

== Plot ==
Rahul, an Indian immigrant arrives in town to discover that the company that offered him a job has gone out of business. He is helped by a local restaurant owner and begins his life in the city as an illegal immigrant worker.

In Setapak, Gienna is a Chinese woman in her thirties who is constantly avoiding phone calls from her mother. She finds herself spending an afternoon helping a stranger, a senile old lady, who cannot remember where her house is.

In Ampang, Hafidd, a young man, meets a pretty stranger at the KLCC LRT station after they both miss the last train. For someone who has never dated anyone in his life, this is a life-defining moment and his only chance at love.

Together the three stories create a collage of the human connections that give life to the city.

The first story shows the injustice in life can receive further injustice; the second portrays kindness across racial barriers, despite issues of racism in different levels of the Malaysian society; while the final installment delivers a subtle message: When one opens his mind to see the beauty in life, life can be beautiful.

== Cast ==
=== Main cast ===
- Sharifah Amani as Siti Nur Hayy
- Azad Jasmin as Rahul
- Nell Ng as Gienna Chan Mei Hu
- Ruminah Sidek as Nek Wok
- Soffi Jikan as Komang
- Amirul Ariff as Hafidd
- Mano Maniam as Vasu
- Radhi Khalid as Feroz
- Sherry Alhadad as Sherry
- Sabri Yunus as Rahim

=== Supporting actors ===
- Amerul Affendi as Amin
- Emely Poon as Joyce
- Jee Kutty as Little One
- Rosnah Mat Aris as Anak Nek Wok
- Azhan Rani as Azhan
- Along Eyzendy as Mat Rempit
- S. Nirmell as Arjun
- Nadia Aqilah as Siti
- Fairuz Fee Tauhid as Nurul
- Prakash Krishna as Ameerdepp
- K.S. Maniam as Boss
- Nigel Kok Yi Jun as Aboy
- Yadiy Taufik as Bike Boy
- Bront Palarae as Police Officer A
- C. K as Police Officer B

=== Special appearance ===
- Dira Abu Zahar as Kuih Sister
- Noramin Nosyi Nosyi as Father Hafidd
- Adibah Noor as Teacher, Lady driver
- Namron as Flat Man
- Farid Kamil as himself
- Sara Ali as herself
- Johan As'ari as Gangster 1
- Idzham Ismail as Gangster 2
- Syazwan Zulkifly as Gangster 3
- Adam Shahz as Gangster 4
- Remy Ishak as Kedai Mamak Customers 1
- Dain Iskandar Said as Kedai Mamak Customers 2
- Ho Yuhang as Kedai Mamak Customers 3
- Chew Kin Wah as Kedai Mamak Customers 4 and DJ Radio
- Alfie Palermo as Kedai Mamak Customers 5

== Soundtrack ==
KL Kita - Yuna featuring Qi Razali

== Reception ==
The film is said to be a "guide to one of the most beautiful cities in the world" (Kuala Lumpur) by Hype.

Kolumpo is, for Hassan Muthalib,"the best mainstream Malaysian film to hit the cinemas this year (2013)".
