= Mencari Rahmat =

- Directed by: Al Jafree Md Yusop
- Written by: Al Jafree Md Yusop
- Produced by: Zuli Ismail; Rahmat Adam (co-producer); Madnor Kassim (executive); Siti Marzuliana Marzuki (executive); Sazrul Yacub (executive)
- Starring: Namron; Amerul Affendi; Nadia Aqilah; Sharifah Amani; Adibah Noor; Fauziah Nawi; Azman Hassan; Eric Fuzi; Tun Fazrul Azri; Anuar Paharudin
- Cinematography: Madnor Kassim
- Edited by: Aliff Ihsan Rahman
- Music by: Pacai
- Production company: AB Roll
- Release date: 29 July 2017
- Running time: 90 minutes
- Country: Malaysia
- Language: Malay

Mencari Rahmat (English: Finding Rahman) is a 2017 Malaysian Malay-language comedy-drama film adaptation of Oscar Wilde's The Importance of Being Earnest, written and directed by Al Jafree Md Yusop and produced by AB Roll Sdn. Bhd.

== Synopsis ==
Razak, an adopted orphan is a successful businessman based in Penang. After both adopted parents have died in an accident, he inherited all their wealth as well as their responsibility, including becoming the guardian to his 19-year-old adopted niece, Ratna, also an orphan. However, while Razak was a bon vivant playboy, he needed to lead a good example to Ratna, and created a cover story and character to allow him to regularly travel to Kuala Lumpur for fun. In Kuala Lumpur, Razak is acquainted with Azman, another orphan living a carefree life who was raised by Azman's aunt, Datin Azizah. Datin Azizah's daughter, Rose, became Razak's love interest. As Razak and Azman struggles to reconcile their conflicting desires of how they should live their lives, their various deceptions unravel and this leads to a monumental discovery, leaving no lives untouched.

== Script development ==
The adaptation process from the original play was never intended for a movie, instead it was an attempt to localise the story into contemporary society that can be performed for Malaysian audience. Al Jafree faced skepticism as some thought that the wit and word play from the original English text could never be translated effectively into Malay. According to Al Jafree, “..everyone kept insisting that I would not be able to capture this essence [of dry humour] in Bahasa Malaysia... But I wanted to prove that Wilde’s work can be adapted into the Malay culture, in the Malay language, and in a Malay atmosphere.” The adaptation process took 10 years, from 1991 to its eventual performance at The Actor's Studio in Kuala Lumpur, and Al Jafree described the experience as "long, lonely and most challenging". The play was directed by Adlin Aman Ramlie, where he kept the English title but the entire performance was in Malay. It was staged from 27 July to 4 August 2001, and while the play was well-received, there was no follow-up performances since then.

== Film production ==
The idea of turning the adapted play into film came about in 2016, after Al Jafree expressed his interest on Facebook and received positive response from friends and former crew members. He decided to keep the play script unchanged, and given that stage-to-film adaptations tend to be text-heavy, it became imperative that the entire cast must have had theatre experience in order for the film to work. Namron and Amerul Affendi were cast as leading men and supporting roles comprise Nadia Aqilah, Sharifah Amani, Adibah Noor, Fauziah Nawi, Azman Hassan, and Eric Fuzi.

This was the first film produced by AB Roll, and they experienced their first financial challenge when a funder backed out five days before shooting begins after having committed to the project. It was to their advantage that they had already focused on compressing the filming to ten days, where Al Jafree managed this by rehearsing intensively. According to Amerul, the cast practiced their lines and blocking about five hours a day, "for about a month before we began shooting".

== Release and reception ==
The film was one of two films selected to represent Malaysia among 18 countries, as part of a total of 27 films screened to the public at the 2017 Kota Kinabalu Film Festival, and Mencari Rahmat premiered on the festival's closing night. The film was described by the organiser as a "sophisticated and witty" black comedy.

The film's theatrical release date has shifted several times, initially rumoured for 2018. While the theatre release was still pending, the film continued to be screened at selected universities, as part of the film promotion as well as engaging with students. The lockdown imposed in Malaysia due to the COVID-19 pandemic has delayed the release date in 2020 from 18 June to 31 December, and the new lockdowns in 2021 further delayed it to 10 June 2021, before the team decided to forego theatrical release and to stream it via Mubi.com instead. The film release now coincides with the National Day celebrations on the 31 August 2021.
