= Sharifah Aryana =

- Born: Sharifah Aryana binti Syed Zainal Rashid Al-Yahya; 21 April 1995 (age 31); Kuala Lumpur, Malaysia
- Status: Single
- Occupations: Actress, model
- Years active: 2007–2008, 2014–present
- Spouse: Jad Haniff Jimmy (m. 2021)
- Relatives: Sharifah Amani (sister)

Sharifah Aryana binti Syed Zainal Rashid Al-Yahya (born 21 April 1995), better known by her stage name Sharifah Aryana, is a Malaysian actress. Sharifah is of Arab-Chinese-Bengali parentage.

She is the youngest daughter with two elder sisters both are also actresses in the Malaysian entertainment scene, one is Sharifah Amani. She's now a Sunway University student and is pursuing a Diploma in Performing Arts.

== Filmography ==
=== Film ===
Year	Title	Role	Notes
2007	Mukhsin	Orked	Main role
2007	Puaka Tebing Biru		Supporting role
2019	Baby!		
2020			
	Don Dukun		

=== Television ===
Year	Title	Role	Notes
2014	Ride	Elana	Lead role
2022	Beriani Gam Kak Aspalela		
