= Al Jafree Md Yusop =

Malaysian writer and director

- Born: 4 October 1966 (age 60); Malaysia
- Occupations: Writer, director

Al Jafree Md Yusop (born 4 October 1966) is a Malaysian writer and director of television and feature films.

== Biography ==
Al Jafree Md Yusop was born on 4 October 1966. He studied in MARA Junior Science College Kuala Terengganu in 1979, before furthering his studies at UiTM in Arau, Perlis to secure a Diploma in Planting, Industry and Management. After a decade with International Islamic University Malaysia as an accountant and IT manager, he left full-time employment and began a three-year period he refers to as "Proses Malas" (Malay for "lazy process"), where he spent time watching films, reading, and traveling.

== Filmography ==
=== Feature films ===
Year	Title	Role
2002	Paloh	Co-wrote with Adman Salleh
2002	Dukun	Co-wrote with Huzir Sulaiman
2017	Mencari Rahmat	Wrote and directed

=== Telemovies ===
Al Jafree's involvement with telemovies:

Year	Title	Role
1999	Sumbangsih	Writer
2002	Teman Malam	Writer
2008	Senandong Malam	Writer
2009	Joe & Faridah	Writer
2015	Melur vs Rajawali	Writer and director
2016	Tulus Ikhlas	Writer
2016	Kembara Nak Dara	Writer and director
2018	Ghahim Takut Nak Azan	Director
2020	Validasi	Director

== Awards ==
- 2007 Boh Cameronian Awards, Best Original Script for P. Ramlee The Musical
- 2016 21st Asian Television Awards (ATA), Best Telemovie for Tulus Ikhlas
- 2016 Anugerah Tribute P. Ramlee (Special Jury Prize) for Kembara Nak Dara
- 2018 Kuala Lumpur Film Critics Circle award for Mencari Rahmat
