= Pete Teo =

Pete Teo (Chinese: 张子夫)
- Born: 26 December 1972 (age 53); Tawau, Sabah, Malaysia
- Genres: Indie folk, indie rock
- Occupations: Singer-songwriter, musician, film producer, music producer, actor
- Instruments: Vocal, acoustic guitar
- Label: Redbag Music
- Website: peteteo.com

Pete Teo

Chinese name
- Traditional Chinese: 張子夫
- Simplified Chinese: 张子夫
- Hanyu Pinyin: Zhāng Zifu
- Jyutping: Zoeng1 Zi2 Fu1
- Hokkien POJ: Tiuⁿ Chú-hu
- Tâi-lô: Tiunn Tsú-hu

Pete Teo (simplified Chinese: 张子夫; traditional Chinese: 張子夫; pinyin: Zhāng Zifu; Jyutping: Zoeng1 Zi2 Fu1; Pe̍h-ōe-jī: Tiuⁿ Chú-hu, born 26 December 1972), is a Malaysian singer songwriter, film composer and filmmaker as well as an actor in what has become known as 'New Wave Malaysian Cinema'. His work is associated with non-partisan reform politics in Malaysia – in particular, using new media resources to promote wider democratic participation, press freedom, and racial unity. Teo's work has been featured on the BBC, CNN, KBS, NHK, as well as numerous international film festivals and arts events. He has made some of the most watched viral videos in Malaysia.

== Life and career ==
Teo was born in Tawau, Sabah, Malaysia. He began his career with two albums as a member of the cult Hong Kong indie duo "Mid-Century" 「中葉」. He subsequently released two solo albums – Rustic Living for Urbanites (2003 / produced by Ronan Chris Murphy) and Television (2006 / produced by Nick Lee & Pete Teo) on his own label Redbag Music. Rustic Living For Urbanites won the Best Music Video and Best Album Cover category at the Anugerah Industri Muzik Malaysia (AIM – Malaysian Music Industry Awards) 2004. His follow-up album Television – an alternative folk music album filled with reflections on a media saturated world and Americana – won all 3 categories it was nominated for at AIM 2007 – Best Album Cover, Best Music Video and Best English Album – where Teo emerged as the biggest winner of the night, the first non-mainstream indie artist to do so in the history of the awards. "Television" subsequently became the first Malaysian record to be licensed and released in South Korea. Teo was also the first ever Malaysian artist to play at the South By Southwest music festival in Austin Texas in 2007.

In April 2008, Teo independently produced a zero-budget, non-partisan, non-profit, multi-artists recording of his anti-racism composition 'Here in My Home'. Entitled 'Malaysian Artistes For Unity (MAFU), the project attracted pro bono participation from over 50 Malaysian artists, media personalities and arts activists – including Ning Baizura, Awie, Afdlin Shauki, Jason Lo, Maya Karin, Tony Fernandes, Jaclyn Victor, etc. and many others personalities and volunteers. The music video for the song, directed by Yasmin Ahmad and Ho Yuhang premiered at the Malaysian Music Industry Awards 2008 to a nationwide television audience. In the weeks subsequent to its release, the video became one of the most viral videos in the world – reaching as high as no. 3. Both the song and the video are available for free download on the project's official website.

In 2009, Teo released 15Malaysia – an anthology of 15 short films themed on social political issues in Malaysia. The project became a watershed in Malaysian popular and political culture, not only by featuring politicians as cast, but also recording more than 15 million visitors on its project website in 60 days. The feature-length version of the films has since been exhibited worldwide including at the Pompidou Paris, Golden Horse Awards, Busan International Film Festival, Rotterdam International Film Festival and more. In the same year, his compositions for the soundtrack of Yasmin Ahmad's film Talentime became popular in Malaysia – with the song Pergi (performed by Aizat Amdan) winning the "Song of the Year" Award at the Anugerah Juara Lagu.

Teo released a music video promoting the vote entitled Undilah in 2011. Featuring celebrities and both government and opposition politicians, the video was banned for broadcasting by the Information Minister Rais Yatim shortly after release. In the subsequent media uproar, the Prime Minister Najib Razak "unbanned" the video and it went on to become ond of the most watched videos in the Malaysia for 2011. Teo was also listed by CNN as amongst the 135 Asians to watch.

16 September 2013 – Teo released "Hari Malaysia" – a music video funded by the public celebrating the 50th year of the formation of Malaysia. Made with archive news footage and extensive CGI visual effects, the video featured a cast of superstars and politicians including Michelle Yeoh, Nurul Izzah Anwar, Tengku Razaleigh Hamzah, Ambiga, Namewee and more. The video also featured the songs "Slipstream" (performed by Melina William) and "Kembara" (performed by Asmidar).

In February 2015, Teo was chosen to represent Malaysia in Art Midwest's Caravanserai project, where he undertook a tour of Texas, Georgia and Florida conducting exhibitions and workshops on his film work. In August of the same year, he shot a rare two hour interview with ex-Malaysian Prime Minister Mahathir Mohamad in Tokyo as part of an ambitious documentary project on recent Malaysian political history. The project has as yet an undetermined release date.

Teo played Tony in DreamWorks / Paramount's Ghost In The Shell, a live action adaptation of the classic manga/anime. Directed by Rupert Sanders and starring Scarlett Johansson, the blockbuster film was released globally in March 2017.

Together with Liew Seng Tat, Teo released “Citizens”, a remarkable 2017 National Day video with the Transport Minister of Malaysia Liow Tiong Lai playing both himself and a confrontational citizen. Rather than celebratory as was normal practice, the video was somber in its questioning of the country's direction, unprecedented in its apologetic confessions and provocative in its use of visual imagery.

2018 saw the world premiere and Golden Leopard nomination of “A Family Tour” by emigre China filmmaker Ying Liang at Locarno Film Festival starring a leading cast of Gong Zhe, Nai An and Teo.

== Discography ==
- Rustic Living for Urbanites (Album – 2003 Redbag Music) – Artist: Pete Teo (Producer: Ronan Chris Murphy)
- Television (Album – 2006 Redbag Music) – Artist: Pete Teo (Producer: Nick Lee & Pete Teo)
- "I Go" (Single – 2008 Redbag Music) – Artist: Pete Teo (Producer: Pete Teo)
- "Here In My Home" (Single – 2008 Redbag Music) – Artist: Malaysian Artistes For Unity (Producer / Composer: Pete Teo)
- "Pergi" (Single – 2009 Universal Music) – Artist: Aizat (Producer / Composer: Pete Teo)
- "Itulah Dirimu" (Single – 2009 Universal Music) – Artist: Aizat (Producer / Composer: Pete Teo)
- "Angel" (Single – 2009 Universal Music) – Artist: Atilia (Producer / Composer: Pete Teo)
- "Talentime Soundtrack" (Album – 2009 Universal Music) – Artist: Various (Producer / Composer: Pete Teo)
- "Hari Malaysia" ('Kembara & Slipstream' – 2013 – Artist: Various (Producer / Composer: Pete Teo)

== Filmography ==
=== Film ===
Year	Title	Role	Notes
2005	Sanctuary		Cameo
2005	A Tree in Tanjung Malim		
2006	A Company Of Mushroom		
2006	Before We Fall in Love Again		
2006	Raindogs		
2006	Gubra		as film score composer
2007	Waiting For Love		
2008	Papadom	Uncle Lim	
2009	Talentime		as film score composer
2009	Call If You Need Me		
2009	At The End of Daybreak		
2009	Stretch		
2009	15Malaysia		film anthology, as producer
2010	Malaysian Ghostly Tales		
2010	Year Without A Summer		In sound design and audio post
2010	Claypot Curry Killers		as composer
2011	Stretch	Mr Thong	
2011	Sini Ada Hantu	John	
2011	Undilah!		Public service announcement, as executive producer
2011	Nasi Lemak 2.0	Gangster Leader	
2012	Be Quiet		as producer and director
2013	Papadom 2	Uncle Lim	
2013	Stay Alive		as director
2013	Hari Malaysia		Music video; as executive producer, director and composer
2015	The Beautiful Losers		
2016	KL24:Zombies		
2017	Ghost in the Shell	Tony	
2017	Citizens		Short film, as co-writer and co-director with Liew Seng Tat.
2018	A Family Tour		
2021	Barbarian Invasion	Roger Woo	
2024	Strangers Eyes	Officer Zheng	

=== Television ===
Year	Title	Role	Network
2020	The Bridge (Season 2)	Sylvester "Silver" DaCosta	Viu/HBO Asia

== Awards ==
- Best Music Video & Best Album Cover for 'Rustic Living For Urbanites' – Anugerah Industri Muzik 2004
- Best Music Video, Best Album Cover & Best English Album for 'Television' – Anugerah Industri Muzik 2007
- Song of the Year for the song 'Pergi' [Composer] – Anugerah Juara Lagu 2009
- CNN's Top 135 'People To Watch' in Asia 2011.
- SHOUT! Awards "Best Youtube Channel" for Pete Teo Television (Nominee) 2013
