= Calimucho =

2008 film

- Directed by: Eugenie Jansen
- Written by: Rogier de Blok; Natasha Gerson
- Produced by: Stienette Bosklopper; Human
- Starring: Evelyne Bougliogne; Tarek Hannoudi; Joshy Huppertz; Manfred Huppertz
- Cinematography: Adri Schrover
- Edited by: Patrick Minks
- Release date: 11 September 2008
- Running time: 93 minutes
- Country: Netherlands
- Languages: Dutch; German

Calimucho is a 2008 Dutch/European feature film, directed by Eugenie Jansen. The film is about the problems within a small family circus, was entirely shot travelling with a small existing circus on tour, the cast consisting of the circus members, but is not a documentary: The story is entirely scripted, written by Natasha Gerson.

== See also ==
- Kalimotxo
