= Vanida Imran =

Malaysian actress, model and television host

- Born: Vanidah binti Imran; 8 February 1973 (age 53); Georgetown, Penang, Malaysia
- Occupations: Actress, model and television host, director, writer
- Spouses: Rashidi Ishak (m. 2000; div. 2018) Arifabillah Idris (m. 2022)
- Children: 2
- Beauty pageant titleholder
- Title: Miss Penang 1993
- Years active: 1993–present
- Major competitions: Miss Malaysia World 1993 (1st Runner-Up)

Vanidah binti Imran (born 8 February 1973) is a Malaysian actress, model and television host. In 2007, she received the Best Female Actress award at 20th Malaysia Film Festival. She is mixed of Indian-Javanese descent.

She is formerly main host of TV3’s women magazine show Nona. The show is talking about women life, healthy lifestyles and family. She eventually became the main host of the show from 2 January 2011 took over Maya Karin.

== Early life ==
Born in Penang to a Penangite Indian father and a Malay mother of Javanese descent who died when she was still a child, Vanidah grew up and spent her teenage years in Kuala Lumpur and completed her secondary education at Convent Bukit Nanas. Vanidah was the 1st Runner-Up of Miss World Malaysia 1993 and she also won the subsidiary title Miss Photogenic.

== Personal life ==
She was married to a Malaysian actor named Rashidi Ishak on 1 October 2000, now both has divorced since 9 August 2018 after being married for 17 years with whom she had two children named Mikail Aimran (born 2002) and Maryam Rashika (born 2004). She obtained her English Studies degree after four years of studies at Open University Malaysia in 2015. She earned a Master's Degree in Performing Arts from University Malaya in March 2022. She was an active and performing member of Silat practitioner group named Seni Silat Cekak Pusaka Ustaz Hanafi Malaysia. She represented Malaysian team to perform the Malay traditional martial arts in Chungju World Martial Arts Masterships (WMC) 2019 in South Korea.

In 2022, Vanida married engineer Arifabillah Idris in a personal event attended only by close friends and family .

== Filmography ==
=== Film ===
Year	Title	Role	Notes
1995	Putera	Princess Balkiss	
1998	Badai Mantera	Noraini	
1999	Perempuan Melayu Terakhir	Mustika	
2001	Ceritera	(voice)	
2002	KL Menjerit	Mustaffa's Wife	
2002	Mami Jarum	Shiqah	
2003	Mami Jarum Junior	Shiqah	
2004	Tujuh Perhentian	Mira	
2004	Hingga Hujung Nyawa	Aliana	
2006	The Red Kebaya	Azizah	
2007	Budak Lapok	Emak Aziz / Normah (voice)	
2008	Akhirat	Nurin Amira	
2008	Histeria	Ustazah	
2008	Sepi	Ilyana	
2009	Setem	Alliyah	
2009	Papadom	Professor Balqis	
2010	Lu Pikirlah Sendiri De Movie	Cik Amy	
2010	Magika	Mahsuri	
2011	Misteri Jalan Lama	Old Lady / Queen Devata	
2012	Untuk Tiga Hari	Ujie	
2013	Papadom 2	Professor Balqis	
2013	Pantang		Also as director and writer; short film
2014	Ophilia	Mother Uji	
2016	Temuan Takdir	Ain	
2018	One Two Jaga	Rozita	
2018	Kalla: Hidup Atau Mati	Sherina	
2018	Orang Itu	Headmistress	
2019	Till Death: Azalea's Wrath	Suraya	
2020	Daulat	Suri	
2021	Tarantula X	Rahayu Rahman	
2022	Juang	Siti	
2022	Daddyku Gangster	Leha	
2023	Imam	Rubiah	
2023	Sumpahan Malam Raya	Datin Sherry	
2023	Maryam Pergi Ke Malam		
2023	Mami Jarum Kembali	Sheqah	

=== Television ===
Year	Title	Role	TV channel
2011	Nona	Herself / Host	TV3

=== Television series ===
Year	Title	Role	TV channel	Notes
1997	Kiambang Bertaut		TV3	
1999	Lis	Lis	TV1	
2002	Pi Mai Pi Mai Tang Tu	Teh Rahayu	TV3	Episode: "Teh Manis"
2012	Tanah Kubur (Season 4)	Khadijah	Astro Oasis	Episode: “Susuk Marhabah”
2017	Mandatori	Dr. Asmah	Astro First Exclusive	
2018	Ramadan dan Hamdan	Cake Seller	TV3	
2022	Kudeta	Mariam Imran	Astro Ria	

=== Telemovie ===
Year	Title	Role	TV channel	Notes
1999	Impian Suraya			
1999	Minah Meenachi			
2003	Neon	Petrol Station Customers I	VCD	
2003	Suri Rumah	Salina	VCD	
2015	Kerana Lemang		TVi	
2015	Rekah	Laila	TV2	
2017	Sinar Cinta	Faridah	TV3	
2017	Mak Tak Bagi Balik	Rohani	TV3	
2017	Kismet	Farah	TV3	
2017	Kasut Bola Pink	Mother Nina	Astro First Exclusive	
2022	Semua Tentang Kita		TV3	

=== Theater ===
Vanida also involved in theaters such as Megat Terawis (1994), Anak Tanjung (1995), Selendang Umi (1997), Laila Majnun (1998), Keris Sang Putri (1999), Tun Perak (2000), Lantai T. Pinkie (2000), Anugerah (2002) and Merdeka, Merdeka, Merdeka (2002). Her other theatre credits including Visits (2003), Moh Ho Huan (2005), Lantai T. Pinkie, KL (2006), Wangi Jadi Saksi (2006), Lantai T.Pinkie, Ipoh (2006), Nyonya (2007), Putra Merdeka (2007), Sirah Junjungan (2009), Mahsuri (2009), Cuci The Musical (2009) Baik Punya Cilok in 2015.

== Awards and nominations ==
=== Malaysian Film Festival ===
Year	Nominated work	Category	Result
2012	Untuk Tiga Hari	Best Actress	Nominated
2009	Setem	Best Supporting Actress	Nominated
2008	Akhirat	Best Actress	Nominated
2007	The Red Kebaya	Best Actress	Won
1998	Perempuan Melayu Terakhir	Best Actress	Nominated

=== Skrin Awards ===
Year	Nominated work	Category	Result
2007	The Red Kebaya	Best Actress (Film)	Won
2000	Minah Meenachi	Best Actress (Drama)	Nominated
