= Sang Pemimpi (film) =

- Directed by: Riri Riza
- Produced by: Mira Lesmana
- Starring: Vikri Septiawan; Ahmad Syaifullah; Azwir Fitrianto; Zulfanny; Lukman Sardi; Mathias Muchus; Rieke Diah Pitaloka; Nazril Irham; Maudy Ayunda
- Distributed by: Miles Film; Mizan Production
- Release dates: 4 December 2009 (Jakarta); 17 December 2009
- Running time: 120 minutes
- Country: Indonesia
- Language: Indonesian
- Budget: Rp12 billion (US$894,345)

Sang Pemimpi is a 2009 Indonesian film adapted from the popular same titled novel by Andrea Hirata. Directed by Riri Riza and starring Vikri Septiawan, Ahmad Syaifullah, Azwir Fitrianto and Zulfanny. The film had its world premiere at the 11th Jakarta International Film Festival on 4 December 2009. It was theatrically released on 17 December 2009.

== Plot ==
Sang Pemimpi is a sequel to Laskar Pelangi. This film tells the story of Ikal and his cousin, Arai, and his best friend, Jimbron, as teenagers, and tells the story of teenagers searching for identity and sexuality at the age of 17.

Ikal still misses his first love who has left Belitung, leaving only memories and a tin box depicting the Eiffel Tower. Arai, a Malay-style playboy, falls in love with his classmate Zakiah Nurmala, but the love seems unrequited. Meanwhile, Jimbron dreams of saving Laksmi, a young girl who works in a grass jelly factory. Together, the three of them try to overcome the problems they face.

== Cast ==
- Vikri Septiawan as Ikal
- Rendy Ahmad as Arai
- Azwir Fitrianto as Jimbron
- Maudy Ayunda as Zakiah
- Mathias Muchus as Seman
- Rieke Diah Pitaloka as Ikal
- Nugie as Balia
