= Sharifah Amani =

Malaysian actress

- Born: Sharifah Amani binti Syed Zainal Rashid Al-Yahya; June 10, 1986 (age 40); Selangor, Malaysia
- Occupations: Actress, director, host
- Years active: 1992—present
- Spouse: Ahmed Faris Amir (m. 2022)
- Children: 1
- Parents: Syed Zainal Rashid bin Syed Zainal Abidin Al-Yahya (father); Fatimah binti Abu Bakar (mother)
- Relatives: Sharifah Aleya; Sharifah Aleysha; Sharifah Aryana

Sharifah Amani binti Syed Zainal Rashid Al-Yahya (born 10 June 1986), better known by her stage name Sharifah Amani, is a Malaysian actress. She is the best known for her role as Orked in Yasmin Ahmad's 'Orked' trilogy (Sepet, Gubra and Mukhsin).

== Biography ==
She is the second daughter of veteran Malaysian actress, Fatimah Abu Bakar. Sharifah is mixed of Arab-Chinese-Bengali parentage. As a teenage writer for the New Straits Times YouthQuake slot, Amani covered assignments like the Shah Rukh Khan and Juhi Chawla press conference, concerts by Bollywood stars, Deep Purple and the 3rd IIFA Awards in Genting Highlands. Sharifah has also dabbled in theatre, having acted as Ophelia in the Bangsar Actors Studio's Hamlet (2005), directed by Faridah Merican.

== Personal life ==
On September 10, 2022, she married the CEO of Impact Integrated, Ahmed Faris Amir. The couple were married by the Head Imam of the Saidina Umar Al Khattab Mosque, Bukit Damansara and the Assistant Registrar of Marriages, Department of Islamic Religion in the Federal Territory (JAWI), Ustaz Mohd Rahimi P Ramlee officiated by the bride's father, Syed Zainal Rashid bin Syed Zainal Abidin Al-Yahya.

== Career ==
=== Film ===
She is most famous for portraying the character Orked in Yasmin Ahmad's Orked trilogy. The first two films are Sepet and Gubra. In the latest instalment, Mukhsin, Sharifah Amani plays the adult version of Orked who "meets" her 10-year-old self (played by her younger sister, Sharifah Aryana). She previously played the supporting role as a sexually abused teenager in the film Gol & Gincu.

She co-stars in the Malaysian film, Cinta, where she is one of ten actors playing 5 different couples portraying different situations based on the theme of love and relationships. Her mother co-stars with her in this movie. In the Cantonese Malaysian horror movie, Possessed, she plays a supporting role as Fara, the assistant and close friend of a Chinese girl, Lisu, who migrated to Malaysia to make it big as a singer. Unfortunately, Lisu is brutally murdered and Fara, as the only witness of the murder, goes insane and is committed to a mental asylum.

She is the main cast in Muallaf, where she acts with Sharifah Aleysha, another one of her younger sisters. This film is also directed by Yasmin Ahmad. To fulfil her role in the movie, she shaved her head bald because in one of the scenes in the movie her character's head is shaved by the father for being too 'wild'.

=== Television ===
Following the relative success of Gol & Gincu in the supporting role as a sexually abused teenager, she reprises this role later in several guest appearances in the TV series based on the movie (Gol & Gincu The Series), as originally broadcast in 2006 on the Malaysian TV channel, 8TV. In 2006, she also hosted a make-over TV show (sponsored by Revlon Silky Girl) on NTV7 with her elder sister, Sharifah Aleya.

In March 2007, TV3 has started broadcasting the dramedy series Emil Emilda in their Samarinda timeslot, starring Sharifah Amani as the lead role of Emilda. She stars in title role of Emilda, a bespectacled geeky filing clerk working in a fictitious TV station, where she catches the attention of the CEO due to her hard-working nature and passion for the broadcasting industry. The CEO finds out his long-lost son, Emil/Boboi who has been missing following a car accident 20 years ago has been sighted. En route to follow up on the information regarding his son, he dies when his private helicopter crashes. It is then revealed in his will that he has chosen Emilda to be his temporary replacement as CEO until his son can be located to be his rightful heir.

== Controversy ==
In 2006 at the 19th Malaysian Film Festival, when accepting her award as Best Actress she said "I sound, like, stupid, if I speak Malay, so I'll speak English". This statement had been interpreted by some parties as if Sharifah was ridiculing the Malay language (being an official language used in the ceremony plus at the national level in Malaysia) when she had meant that she was not really fluent in it. She later claimed that she was misquoted when her statement was translated by the Malay media.

== Filmography ==
Key
Denotes film / dramas that have not yet been released

=== Film ===
Year	Title	Role	Notes
1992	Selubung	Palestine Children	Debut film appearances
2005	Sepet	Orked	
2005	Gol & Gincu	Najihah Hafizam aka Jiji	
2006	Gubra	Orked	
2006	Cinta	Arianna	
2006	Possessed	Fara	
2007	Puaka Tebing Biru	Atilia	
2007	Mukhsin	Adult Orked	
2007	1957: Hati Malaya	Ani / Aishah	
2008	Punggok Rindukan Bulan	Riza	
2008	Selamat Pagi Cinta	Suci	
2008	Muallaf	Rohani	
2008	Cicakman 2: Planet Hitam	Iman	
2009	Sayang You Can Dance	Mia	
2009	15Malaysia - (Episode: Chocolate)		Short film
2010	Magika	Bawang Putih	
2011	Appalam	Siti	Malaysian-Tamil film
2011	Hunters		
2012	Pontianak Vs. Orang Minyak	Maria Ogawa	
2013	Kolumpo	Siti Nur Hayy	
2013	PSIKO: Pencuri Hati	Wani	
2014	Terbaik dari Langit	Sara	
2015	Gangsterock Kasi Sengat	Nian	
2016	Pekak	Dara	
2016	Pigeon	Yasmin	
2017	KL 24: Zombies		Independent film
2017	Sindiket	Aminah	
2017	Mencari Rahmat	Ratna	
2018	Gol & Gincu Vol: 2	Najihah Hafizam aka Jiji	
2019	Motif	Inspector Dewi	
2020	Hail, Driver!	Female Passenger 1	
2021	Zombitopia	Maya	
2023	La Luna	Hanie Abdullah	
2024	SyurgaKu	Sofea	Short film

=== Other film credits ===
Year	Title	Role	Director	Notes & Awards
2009	Talentime	Assistant Director	Yasmin Ahmad	Best Director Award FFM 22
2010	Sangkar	Director	Herself	Anthology film
2011	Hikayat Merong Mahawangsa	Assistant Director / Stunt	Yusry Abdul Halim	Malaysia's second highest-budgeted film (£8 million)
2012	Kampung Bangsar	Director	Herself	
2013	Hawa	Director	Herself	This film is an anthology film in Ikal Mayang
2018	5minit	Director	Herself	

=== Television series ===
Year	Title	Role	TV channel
2006–2007	Gol & Gincu The Series	Najihah Hafizam aka jiji	8TV
2007	Emil Emilda	Emilda	TV3
2008	Sindarela	Zoela	TV3
2009	Rona Roni Makaroni	Rona	Astro Ria
2010	Tiramisu	Melur	TV3
2011	Cita & Cinta	Zalia	TV9
2015	Ajaibnya Cinta	Hammara	TV3
2016	Cinta 100kg	Wati	TV3
2019	Kopitiam: Double Shot	Alia	Viu
2022	Murder By Moonlight	Bella	Astro Citra

=== Telemovie ===
Year	Title	Role	TV channel
2009	Antara Garisan	Weeda	Astro Ria
2010	Dali Cinta	Nisa	TV3
2010	Karma Salina	Tia	TV3
2011	Kashaf Imani	Nisa	Astro Ria
2011	La Ikro Hafiddin	Nurlisa	Astro Prima
2012	Fatihah Untuk Abah	Fatihah	TV3
2012	Pelarian	Miza	TV3
2013	Lembut Bukan Lelaki	Lembut	Astro Ria
2013	Diari Ariana	Ariana	TV2
2014	Nostalgila	Zett	Astro First Exclusive
2014	Saloma: Pandang Kasih (Bahagian 2)	Siput Sarawak	Astro First Exclusive
2015	Melur vs Rajawali	Hannah	TV1
2016	Fatin	Fatin	TV3
2017	Selamat Tinggal Aidilfitri	Dhia	Astro Prima
2017	Kembalikan Syawalku	Nurse	Astro Citra
2017	Ti Amo Venezia	Nadia	
2018	Cikgu A+	Teacher Zeti	TV2

=== Television ===
Year	Title	Role	TV channel
2006–2007	Latido	Host	TV9

=== Podcast ===
Year	Title	Role	Notes
2020	Dengar Cerita	Narrator	Episode: "2 - Dalam Gambar"
2020	Shakma Productions' Podcast	Guest	Episode: "Bold, Beautiful & Blessed"
2020	Lepak Seni	Co-host	With Shamaine Othman
2020	Kopi Konversations	Guest	Episode: "Sharifah Amani, Malaysian Film, Culture and Everything Else"
2020	Ruang Bertamu	Guest	Episode: "Acting in Malaysia"/"A Passion for Acting", with Amerul Affendi and Nadiya Nisaa
2021	Content Forum: Let's Talk	Guest	Episode: "Reel Women" (alongside: Fatimah Abu Bakar, Sofia Jane, Susan Lankester, and Daiyan Trisha)

== Awards and nominations ==
18th Malaysian Film Festival 2005

- Most Promising Newcomer Award (Sepet)

19th Malaysian Film Festival 2006

- Best Actress Award (Gubra) * the youngest winner of the category (20 years old)
