= Talentime =

2009 film by Yasmin Ahmad

- Directed by: Yasmin Ahmad
- Written by: Yasmin Ahmad
- Produced by: Mohd Effendy Harjoh
- Starring: Mahesh Jugal Kishor; Pamela Chong; Syafie Naswip; Jaclyn Victor; Adibah Noor
- Cinematography: Keong Low
- Edited by: Affandi Jamaludin
- Music by: Pete Teo
- Production companies: Grand Brilliance; Red Chilli Films
- Distributed by: Cathay-Keris Films; Grand Brilliance; Primeworks Studios
- Release dates: 25 March 2009 (Hong Kong); 26 March 2009 (Malaysia)
- Running time: 120 minutes
- Country: Malaysia
- Languages: English, Malay, Cantonese, Mandarin, Tamil, Hindi, Malaysian Sign Language
- Budget: MYR 1.3 Million

Talentime is a 2009 Malaysian Malay-language romantic drama film written and directed by Yasmin Ahmad. Yasmin, in her blog, has described it "as a story full of joy and pain, hope and despair, a host of beautifully-written songs, and rich characters". A Hindu open cremation and a scene reminiscent of the 2001 Kampung Medan riots are included in the film.

The film was released on 26 March 2009 in Malaysia and marks Yasmin's last feature film prior to her death on 25 July 2009.

== Plot ==
In a secondary school at Kuala Lumpur, Teacher Adibah plans to organise a talent show titled Talentime with a final prize of RM1000, holding a raffle to decide the participating teachers. Another teacher, Tan, is roped into joining the raffle by fellow teacher Anuar. The group decide to have seven teachers judging the show, with seven students who would pick up seven respective finalists. Melur, a Malay-Eurasian mixed girl, requests her mother to teach her to dance to attend the school's audition show.

Ganesh discusses plans with his sister Vimala to financially support his nephew, Mahesh, one of the students chosen to fetch the finalists. Mahesh is assigned by his traditionalist mother to accompany Ganesh's bathing ceremony, overseen by Mahesh's open-minded sister Bhavani.

At the Talentime auditions, the students engage in various performances including pianist Melur, erhuist Kahoe and guitarist Hafiz, who sings an original song. Hafiz divides his time between school and his mother Embun, who is hospitalised for a brain tumour. Mahesh gathers with the finalist fetchers at school, waiting for Adibah to assign them. Mahesh is tasked with delivering Melur's participation letter, as she is named one of the seven finalists, and begins a relationship with her.

Mahesh returns one night to witness Ganesh fatally stabbed on his wedding day. The next day, Tan and Anuar pick up Melur, informed that Ganesh was murdered by a neighbouring Muslim family in mourning, uncomfortable with Ganesh's wedding celebration, and thus Mahesh is unavailable. Mahesh visits Melur afterschool, interested in her piano skills and voice. Mahesh takes Melur to her house, where her family disparage his silence at the situation.

Hafiz is accused of cheating by Kahoe for using a makeshift dice despite only getting the questions right by chance and knowledge. Tan confronts Kahoe and proves Hafiz's fair-play by giving him 25 extra questions, where he gained complete marks. Kahoe tells Tan he would be abused by his father for not reaching first place, leading him to accuse Hafiz of cheating. At the hospital, Hafiz shows Embun his test results, impressing her and nurse Vimala, Mahesh's aunt.

Melur snaps at Mahesh after being continuously ignored, assuming that Mahesh's silence was due to his grief over his family tragedy. However, Hafiz reveals that Mahesh is deaf, leading Melur to make amends. Melur invites Mahesh to her house again, where she is chastised by her family for their previous encounter. Embun worries about Hafiz neglecting studies for his talent show but ultimately declares she is happy for him. That night, Mahesh informs Bhavani of his relationship with Melur and Ganesh's email he wrote a day before his death.

Next morning, Melur misses out on rehearsals to have a date with Mahesh, and Hafiz chooses to stand in her place. Melur's family travel to Cameron Highlands, and Bhavani reveals Ganesh had not moved on from his previous relationship with a girl from an Indian Muslim family of grocers that he was forced to break up with due to religious differences, which Bhavani's mother indiscriminately compares to the Muslims who murdered Ganesh on his wedding night. Upon returning, Melur invites Mahesh to sleep over at her house.

On the day of the final rehearsal, Mahesh is forced to disclose his relationship with Melur to his family. They nearly assault him as Melur's family car passes by but are stopped by Bhavani. Kahoe is informed by Hafiz of Embun's passing, and Mahesh reads Ganesh's email, revealing that Ganesh's childhood crush married a man against her parents' wishes. Ganesh had waited for her return, only to find out she died the previous year. At the Talentime finals, Melur forfeits her performance out of embarrassment. She runs into Mahesh who follows her out of the hall, calling him out for "talking too much." The film ends with Hafiz's performance, which Kahoe later joins in ensemble.

== Cast ==
- Mahesh Jugal Kishor as Mahesh, a deaf Indian boy who later falls in love.
- Pamela Chong as Melur, a Malay-Eurasian Talentime finalist who sings and plays the piano.
- Syafie Naswip as Hafiz, a Malay Talentime finalist who sings and plays the guitar.
- Jaclyn Victor as Bhavani, Mahesh's considerate elder sister whose mother favors in comparison to Mahesh.
- Howard Hon Kahoe as Kahoe, a Malaysian Chinese Talentime finalist who plays the erhu and resents Hafiz.
- Amelia Henderson as Melati, Melur's younger sister.
- Adibah Noor as Cikgu Adibah, the teacher in charge of organising the Talentime.
- Azean Irdawaty as Embun, Hafiz's mother who is diagnosed with terminal brain cancer.
- Harith Iskander as Harith, Melur's comical father.
- Sukania Venugopal as Mahesh's mother.
- Jit Murad as Ismael, A patient who befriends Embun at the hospital during her final days.
- Mislina Mustaffa as Melur's mother.
- Tan Mei Ling as Mei Ling, a Chinese Muslim convert who works as a maid for Melur's family.
- Ida Nerina as Datin Kalsom, a friend of Melur's mother who distrusts Mei Ling.

Sharifah Amani was supposed to be cast as Melur in the film. However, due to clash of schedules, she was replaced by Pamela Chong. She did, however, play a role as the 3rd Assistant Director for the film. This would mark the first time that Sharifah Amani has played a behind-the-scene role in Yasmin Ahmad's films.

== Music ==
The film score was composed by Pete Teo. Songs include:

- O Re Piya by Rahat Fateh Ali Khan, taken from the Bollywood movie, Aaja Nachle
- I Go by Aizat Amdan.
- Just One Boy by Aizat Amdan.
- Angel by Atilia.
- Kasih Tak Kembali by Atilia.

All songs were written and produced by Teo himself, except Kasih Tak Kembali which was written by Ahmad Hashim.

The original soundtrack album was released by Universal Music, which also includes Malay language versions of many of the principal songs in the film. This includes I Go (as 'Pergi'), Angel, and Just One Boy (as 'Itulah Dirimu').

== Screening ==
As in all of Yasmin's previous works, Talentime opens with the basmalah (Bismillahirahmanirrahim, "In the name of God, the most Gracious and most Merciful"). Like Muallaf, the verse is displayed in a language and script different from Arabic in Talentime, i.e. in Tamil - பிஸ்மில்லாஹிர்ரஹ்மானிர்ரஹீம்.

== Awards and nominations ==
Year	Award	Category	Recipient(s) and nominee(s)	Result
2009	22nd Malaysia Film Festival	Best Screenplay	Yasmin Ahmad	Won
2009	22nd Malaysia Film Festival	Best Director	Yasmin Ahmad	Won
2009	22nd Malaysia Film Festival	Best Original Story	Yasmin Ahmad	Nominated
2009	22nd Malaysia Film Festival	Best Promising Actress	Jaclyn Victor	Won
2009	22nd Malaysia Film Festival	Best Actor	Mahesh Jugal Kishor	Nominated
2009	22nd Malaysia Film Festival	Best Supporting Actor	Syafie Naswip	Nominated
2009	22nd Malaysia Film Festival	Best Cinematography	Soon Keong	Nominated
2009	22nd Malaysia Film Festival	Best Editing	Affandi Jamaludin	Nominated
2009	22nd Malaysia Film Festival	Best Original Music Score	Pete Teo	Nominated
2009	22nd Malaysia Film Festival	Art Direction	Nick	Nominated
2009	22nd Malaysia Film Festival	Special Jury Prize - for Implementing Humanitarian Elements In A Motion Picture		Won
2009	23rd Anugerah Juara Lagu	Best Song	"Pergi" — Pete Teo and Amran Omar, performed by Aizat Amdan	Won
