= Possessed (2006 film) =

- Directed by: Bjarne Wong
- Written by: King Chi; Jeff Leong; Bjarne Wong; Sam Wong
- Produced by: Sam Wong
- Starring: Amber Chia; Harisu; Alan Yun; Steve Yap; Sharifah Amani
- Cinematography: Kim Meng
- Edited by: Jeff Leong
- Distributed by: Mypartners
- Release date: 30 November 2006
- Running time: 88 minutes
- Country: Malaysia
- Language: Cantonese
- Budget: RM 1.62 million
- Box office: RM 400,000

Possessed is a 2006 Malaysian horror film starring Amber Chia and Harisu, and is the second feature film by director Bjarne Wong.

== Plot summary ==
Amber (Malay name Nurlin) and Lisu are two sisters from China, who have come to Malaysia to further their modelling and singing careers. One day Lisu goes missing, while Amber falls into a coma and is taken back to China for treatment. She awakens five months later with no memory of her past, and returns to Malaysia with her boyfriend, Dino. Amber decides to resume her modelling career and search for Lisu, but finds herself being harassed by an obsessive male fan and haunted by visions of her sister.

== Cast ==
- Amber Chia as Amber
- Harisu as Lisu
- Alan Yun as Dino, Amber's boyfriend and manager
- Steve Yap as William, Lisu's boyfriend who also had an affair with Amber
- Sharifah Amani as Fara, Lisu's assistant and close friend
- Liu Yan Yan as Belle, Dino's personal assistant who is jealous of Amber
- Smyth Wong as Cisse
- Manolet as the obsessive fan

== Production ==
Possessed was a joint venture between Malaysia's Hock Star Entertainment and China's Beijing 3 Bros Film & Media Company, and the second feature film by director Bjarne Wong. Speaking at a press conference prior to the start of filming, Wong expressed his desire to "make a movie that is aesthetically beautiful, using the cast and especially the backdrop to show audience the beauty and wonders of Malaysia."

Filmed on a budget of RM1.5 million, Possessed was shot over a period of 20 days, mostly in the director's home city of Kuching. Wong enlisted the help of his mentor, Hong Kong filmmaker Stanley Tong, in an advisory role, and praised the cast for their hard work and enthusiasm for the film. Harisu, whose lines were spoken in her native Korean and later dubbed, also sang the films theme song.
