= The Red Kebaya =

2006 Malaysian film

- The one-sheet promotional poster.
- Directed by: Oliver Knott
- Written by: Andre Berly; Ramli Hassan; Oliver Knott
- Produced by: Andre Berly; Ramli Hassan
- Starring: Ramli Hassan; Vanida Imran; Bob Mercer; Samantha Schubert; Farah Ahmad
- Cinematography: Raja Muhkriz; Raja Ahmad
- Edited by: Kate James
- Music by: Abbs Abdali
- Production company: L' Agenda Production
- Distributed by: Golden Screen Cinemas
- Release date: November 23, 2006 (Malaysia)
- Running time: 100 minutes
- Country: Malaysia
- Languages: English; Malay

The Red Kebaya is a 2006 Malaysian period drama film released by Golden Screen Cinemas, directed by Oliver Knott and produced by Andre Berly and Ramli Hassan. The film premiered in Malaysian cinemas on 23 November 2006 and is rated PG13.

== Plot summary ==
Latiff (Ramli Hassan) is a famous but lonely photographer who was orphaned as a small child. He sets out on an expedition to photograph abandoned houses around Malaysia. On his journey he is haunted by images and sounds that remind him of his traumatic childhood. At one particular house on the island of Penang, Latiff is magically transported back over 50 years to witness the shocking events that occurred there. Through his experience, Latiff comes to understand the significance of the Red Kebaya, a traditional Malay outfit, and the tragic circumstances that led to him being orphaned.

== Cast ==
=== Main ===
- Ramli Hassan as Latiff
- Vanida Imran as Azizah
- Bob Mercer as John Reynolds
- Samantha Schubert as Davina Reynolds

=== Supporting ===
- Zahim Albakri as Hoggy
- Sabera Shaik as Amber
- Fauziah Nawi as Makcik
- Elaine Daly as Nurul
- Patrick Teoh as Loong
- Jo Kukathas as Shanti
- Sham Sunder as Maniam
- Paula Malai Ali as Dorothy Chapman
- Stuart Payne as David Chapman
- Mohd Afif Abdul Halim as young Latiff
- Farah Ahmad as dancer 1

== Production crew ==
- Producers: Andre Berly and Ramli Hassan
- Original Music: Abbs Abdali
- Cinematography: Raja Muhkriz Raja Ahmad
- Film Editing: Kate James
- Sound Department: Vincent Poon and Alex Thong
- Visual Effects: Jamie Hediger and Michelle Hunt
- Digital Producer: Jonathan Dixon
- Music-score engineer/technician: Matthew J Clinch

== Production ==
Principal photography took 35 days, shooting was done entirely in Malaysia. Actor Bob Mercer had only 3 weeks to learn and memorise his lines in Malay.

Initially the owners of the Cheong Fatt Tze Mansion were reluctant to have their premise used for filming. But after a series of meetings and much persuasion that lead them to better understand the concept of the movie, they finally allowed the crew and cast in.

The film's budget is an estimated RM1.5 million.

== Awards and nominations ==
20th Malaysian Film Festival (2007)

- Best Film
- Best Actress - Vanida Imran (WON)
- Best Actor - Ramli Hassan
- Best Actor in a Supporting Role - Zahim Albakri
- Best Actress in a Supporting Role - Samantha Schubert
- Best Sound Effects - Addaudio Ex. (WON)
- Best Costume Designer/ Garment - Shamsu Yusof (WON)
- Best Poster (WON)
- Best Cinematography - Raja Mukhriz Raja Ahmad Kamaruddin
- Best Original Music Score - S. Atan
- Best Original Theme Song - S. Atan
