= Adibah Noor =

Malaysian singer, actress and master of ceremonies (1970–2022)

- أديبة نور
- Born: Adibah Noor binti Mohamed Omar; 3 September 1970; Kuala Lumpur, Malaysia
- Died: 18 June 2022 (aged 51); Kuala Lumpur, Malaysia
- Resting place: Taman Keramat Permai Muslim Cemetery, Hulu Kelang, Selangor
- Citizenship: Malaysian
- Education: National University of Malaysia
- Occupations: Singer; Actress; Television host; Radio presenter; Product ambassador
- Years active: 1995–2022
- Musical career
- Genres: Pop, R&B
- Instrument: Vocals
- Label: Adibah Noor Entertainment

Adibah Noor Mohamed Omar (3 September 1970 – 18 June 2022) was a Malaysian singer, actress and master of ceremonies. She made her start in the entertainment industry in 1995 and had gone on to star in films such as Sepet and Gubra.

== Early life and career ==
Born in Kuala Lumpur, Adibah was a teacher who taught English as a second language and was previously a graduate of the National University of Malaysia. Her first singing competition was in a talent show called Suara 90-an Nescafe, where she won first place in 1994.

== Career ==
=== 2005–2010: Terlalu Istimewa, Cahaya ===
In 2006, Adibah released her first album entitled "Terlalu Istimewa". The album featured an eponymous song, a ballad written in response to the rape and gruesome murder of a 10-year-old girl that took place in Johor Bahru in January 2004. The album garnered critical acclaim and six nominations for the 13th Anugerah Industri Muzik, as well as Best Ballad and Best Vocal in the 21st Anugerah Juara Lagu.

=== 2011–2022 ===
To celebrate her 22 years in the entertainment industry, Adibah planned to hold a mini concert named 'Into The 3rd Decade' to take place on 21 and 22 October at KLPAC, Kuala Lumpur. Adibah also served as a judge for a singing competition talent show for Astro titled Duo Star.

On 24 February 2017, it was revealed that Adibah would release her third full album Jiwa Sentuh Jiwa in March. The album, containing eight tracks, would include collaborations with singer like Misha Omar, Anuar Zain, Amir Jahari, Nassier Wahab, Dina Nadzir and Sam Innuendo among others.

== Death ==
Adibah died at Gleneagles Hospital Kuala Lumpur on 18 June 2022 due to her fourth-stage ovarian cancer. She was 51 years old. She was buried at Taman Keramat Permai Muslim Cemetery, Hulu Kelang, Selangor.

== Filmography ==
=== Films ===
Year	Title	Role	Notes
2005	Sepet	Kak Yam	
2006	Buli Balik	Host	
2006	Gubra	Kak Yam	
2007	Mukhsin	Kak Yam	
2009	Talentime	Cikgu Adibah	
2010	Magika	Makcik Halia	
2010	Hooperz	Coach D	
2010	Crayon	Mak Engku	
2010	Aku Tak Bodoh	Mak Jah	
2011	Nasi Lemak 2.0	Nor	
2012	Hoore! Hoore!	Lia	
2012	Pontianak vs Orang Minyak	Saodah	
2013	Kolumpo	Teacher	
2014	Mamak Cupcake	Jury	
2014	Rentap	Puan Nora	
2015	Fundamentally Happy	Habiba Hj Salam	
2017	Mencari Rahmat	Datin Azizah	
2019	Rumahku	Mak Engku	Short film
2021	The Code of Happiness	Puan Nina	
2021	Selamat Hari X Jadi	Dekan	
2021	Chomel	Hakim Zulaikha	
2021	Hantu Ke Lima	Puan Sri Zaleha	
2021	Busuk	Ustazah Mariam	Short film
2022	Juang	Kak Long	Her last film
2023	Eraser	Khatijah	Her last film
2023	Adoiii Jiwaku	Munah	Her last film
2024	Baik Punya Ah Long	Cassandra Khutub	Her last film

=== Television series ===
Year	Title	Role	TV channel	Notes
2009	Phua Chu Kang Sdn Bhd	Fatimah	Channel 5	
2012	Small Mission Enterprise	Aminah	NTV7	
2012–2013, 2017	Oh My English!	Puan Hajar	Astro TVIQ	
2017	Jadikan Aku Yang Kedua	Hajar Latifah	Astro Oasis	
2018	Lafazkan Kalimah Cintaku	Kak Kembong (Bong)	Astro Ria	Special appearance
2019	Plan Cinta	Che Timah	TV3	
2020	Kampung People 2	Dona	TV3	
2020	Rumah Dara	Umi Jah	Awesome TV	
2021	Covid Oh Covid	Habsah	TV3	
2021	Man Transform		Awesome TV	
2021	Keluarga Untuk Disewa	Puan Sri Maryam	TV9	
2022	Mem & Bibik Bibik	Bibik Mok	TV3	
2022	Hantu Raya Pergi Perang	Dato' Null	Sooka	Her last drama, special appearance

=== Television movies ===
Year	Title	Role	TV channel
2014	Nostalgila	Mechanic	Astro First Exclusive
2014	Nasi Dagang Nasi Ayam	Abibah	TVi
2015	Nasi Ayam Duda	Timah	TV2
2016	Mati Tunggu Sekejap	Kamaliah	Astro Oasis
2017	Cupid	Boss	Astro Citra
2017	Bisik Pada Allah	Kiah	Astro Citra
2019	Pendoa Yang Ikhlas	Kak Limah	TV2
2020	Aku OCD		Astro Citra

=== Radio ===
Year	Title	Station
13 February 2013 – 31 May 2016	Suria Pagi	Suria

=== Commercials ===
Title
TV3 Fifa World Cup 2002: Makan Bola
TV3 Fifa World Cup 2002: Pasu Pecah
TV3 Crocodile Hunter
TV3 The Rock
TV3 Merdeka Combat
TV3 Temple
TV3 Raya: Cekodok Monster
TV3 Raya: Baru Balik Dari London
TV3 Raya: Kucing Hitam
Telekom Malaysia: ITalk
Hari Raya: Proton
Petronas: Ikan Dilaut, Asam Didarat
Libresse
Libresse: Wachaaa!
Delivery Ke Hati Seri
Sadaqah

== Discography ==
=== Studio albums ===
- Terlalu Istimewa (2005)
- Teman (2010)
- Jiwa Sentuh Jiwa (2017)
- Kecurigaan (2022)
- Setulus Rasa (2022)

=== Other singles ===
- Zapin Cinta SMS (duet with Senario)
- Appy Thots (featuring Doul)
- Hujan (theme song of Mukhsin)
- Bahasa Rindu (duet with Nizam)

== Awards and nominations ==
- Anugerah Juara Lagu 2006 (Best Vocal) - Adibah Noor
- Anugerah Juara Lagu 2006 (Ballads Category) - "Terlalu Istimewa"
- Anugerah Juara Lagu 2006 (Best Song) - "Terlalu Istimewa"
- Hits 1 Akhir 2007 (Overall Winner) - "Terlalu Istimewa"
- Hits 1 Akhir 2007 (Best Performance) - "Terlalu Istimewa"
