= Harith Iskander =

Malaysian actor, host and comedian (born 1966)

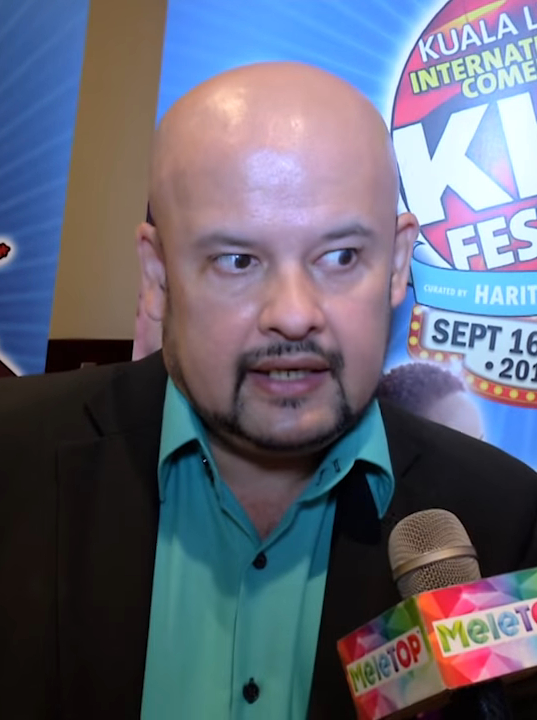
- Iskander interviewed by MeleTOP during the Kuala Lumpur International Comedy Fest press conference on 15 September 2015.
- Born: Harith Iskander bin Musa; 7 August 1966 (age 60); Johor Bahru, Johor, Malaysia
- Education: Curtin University
- Occupations: Actor, comedian, television host, director, writer, singer
- Years active: 1990–present
- Notable work: Ah-ha; Baik Punya Cilok; Buli Balik; Komediri; Lawak Ke Der; Obviously Harith Iskander; Funniest Person in the World 2016
- Spouse: Jezamine Lim (m. 2010; div. 2024)
- Children: 3
- Website: harithiskander.com

Harith Iskander bin Musa (born 7 August 1966) is a Malaysian actor and comedian. He is considered to be "the Godfather of Stand-Up Comedy" in Malaysia, having also won the Asia's Best Stand-Up Comedian Award 2014 by Top 10 of Asia Magazine.

He won the Laugh Factory Funniest Person in the World competition in December 2016.

== Early life ==
Harith was raised in Johor Bahru in the state of Johore. His father, Musa Ibrahim, hailed from the state and was of Malay descent. His mother, Jane Musa, was of Scottish ancestry from the Grant clan, working in the United Nations Headquarters in New York City as a secretary. They met in the Democratic Republic of Congo during the Congo Crisis, Musa being a member of the peacekeeping corps sent there by the Malaysian government while Jane worked as part of the UN staff.

He attended Curtin University in Perth, Australia, majoring in journalism and obtained a Bachelor of Arts in English. He graduated in 1988.

During his university and young adult days, Harith made a conscious decision to embrace Australian culture while he was an international student despite his aversion to studies. For example, his curiosity led him to trying the sport of cricket. On another occasion, Harith described a time when he entered an adult shop in Australia after arriving from Malaysia, only to find the place full of Malaysian students.

== Career ==
Harith's career in stand-up comedy began during 1990 or 1991, when he was persuaded by a university friend to get on stage in the old Subang Airport Hotel lobby lounge to tell some funny stories. It was at this lounge where a member of the audience saw Harith and invited him to another function to perform on-stage.

In 2016, Harith was one of 89 international stand-up comedians nominated for Laugh Factory's Funniest Person in the World. Harith was announced as an ambassador for Culture and Tourism Malaysia by Datuk Seri Nazri Aziz (Tourism and Culture Minister) as he is now one of the attractions in Malaysia.

After being crowned as the Laugh Factory's Funniest Person in the World in 2016, the following year Harith curated the Kuala Lumpur International Comedy Festival (KLICFest 2017), which is considered by many to be Asia's best comedy showcase. The festival programme featured performances from the finest Malaysian acts, the biggest international stars and one local legend offering both English and Bahasa Malaysia comedy.

Thereafter, the kick-off show (KLICFest) in Kuala Lumpur, in 2018, Harith Iskander, in partnership with Celcom, toured his home ground again to deliver the laughs – the #KitaOK Live Comedy Tour 2018. The tour started off in Kuala Lumpur before showing at six other cities in Malaysia: including Johor Bahru, Melaka, Penang, Kuching, Kota Kinabalu and Labuan. Harith also succeeded in putting Malaysia on the comedy map the second time by releasing his Netflix original comedy special, I Told You So in 2018.

Apart from that in 2018, Harith held his Australia tour named Harith Iskander The Tour - Melbourne International Comedy Festival 2018, Adelaide Fringe 2018 and Perth Fringe 2018. Besides, Harith tickled audiences in the City of Angels (Los Angeles) in June 2017 where the organizer was The Laugh Factory.

== Comedic philosophy ==
Iskander's view of comedy is that the best comedians are the most authentic comedians; that is to say, a good comedian does not become someone they are not just because they are on a stage. Iskander describes his comedy as 'totally observational and personal', filled with personal experience. He describes himself as 'not a shock comedian', but one who has his own 'personal barriers'; for example, one area in which he 'treads carefully' is the subject of politics. He notes that Malaysian comedy tends to be 'casually racist' sometimes.

Iskander's source of jokes comes from religion and his everyday surroundings. He is an advocate of cross-border relations between Singaporean and Malaysian comedians.

== Personal life ==
On 12 June 2010, Iskander married doctor and FHM model Jezamine Lim after meeting her through Facebook. Sometime in June 2024, Jezamine Lim had filed for divorce from Iskander at the Syariah Lower Court in Kuala Lumpur.

== Filmography ==
=== Film ===
Year	Title	Role	Notes
1992	Selubung	Brother Musa	
1997	Hanya Kawan	Harith	Also as director and writer
1999	Anna and the King	Nikorn	
2004	Sepet	Abah	
2005	Baik Punya Cilok	Inspector Roslan	
2006	Buli Balik	Dr. Kam	
2006	Gubra	Abah	
2008	Cuci	David	
2009	Talentime	Harith	
2010	Aku Tak Bodoh	Bag Store Boss	Cameo appearance
2022	Kongsi Raya	Rahim	
2022	Spilt Gravy on Rice	Co-pilot "Angel"	
2022	Ada Hantu 2	Hos	Special appearance

=== Television ===
Year	Title	TV channel	Role	Notes
1991–1999, 2007	Jangan Ketawa	TV3; NTV7		
1998	Kugiran	TV3	Ben	Telemovie
2004–2005	Ah-Ha	TV3		Also as director
2007	Thursday Night Live	NTV7	Himself, as talk show host	
2009–2010	Phua Chu Kang Sdn Bhd	NTV7, Mediacorp Channel 5	Izzy	
	Rojak		Paul	
2012–2016	Lawak Ke Der!	Astro Warna	Himself	
2015	Komediri	Astro Warna	Himself	
2016	Obviously Harith Iskander	Astro Awani	Himself, as talk show host	
2017	Celebrity Car Wars Season 2	History HD	Himself/participant	
2018	I Told You So	Netflix	Himself	
2024	Muzikal Lawak Superstar (season 4)	Astro Warna	Himself, as jury	

== Discography ==
=== Single ===
Year	Song title	Single
2024	"Bukit Mak"	Namewee & Harith Iskander

== Other appearances ==
Iskander has also appeared in various comedy sittings such as The Kings and Queens of Comedy Asia and the Best of Comedy Malaysia at Lower Town Hall, Melbourne.
