= Sepet =

2004 film by Yasmin Ahmad

Sepet Slit Eye
- Theatrical release poster
- Directed by: Yasmin Ahmad
- Written by: Yasmin Ahmad
- Produced by: Rosnah Kassim; Elyna Shukri
- Starring: Ng Choo Seong; Sharifah Amani; Linus Chung; Harith Iskander; Ida Nerina; Adibah Noor; Tan Mei Ling; Thor Kar Hoong
- Cinematography: Low Soon Keong
- Edited by: Affandi Jamaludin
- Release date: 24 February 2005
- Running time: 104 minutes
- Country: Malaysia
- Languages: English; Malay; Cantonese; Hokkien (Min Nan); Mandarin

Sepet (English: Slit Eyes) is a 2005 Malaysian Malay-language teen romantic comedy-drama film set in Ipoh, Malaysia. Directed by Yasmin Ahmad, it tells of a love that blooms between a Chinese boy and a Malay girl. Sepet is a Malay word which, in this context, refers to the 'slit eyes' of the Chinese.

== Plot ==
19-year-old Ah Loong (who also called himself "Jason") is in charge of a market stall selling pirated VCDs, but is an incurable romantic with an unlikely hobby: he loves to read and write poetry. One day, his life takes a sudden turn one day when a Malay schoolgirl, Orked, comes to his stall looking for films starring her favourite actor, Takeshi Kaneshiro. Jason and Orked start a romantic relationship, although social and racial pressures stand in their way.

Jason is involved in a road accident while Orked is going to England to pursue her studies. In a post credits scene, Orked is shown sleeping beside Jason, both wearing a wedding ring.

== Cast ==
- Choo Seong Ng as Jason aka Ah Loong
- Sharifah Amani as Orked
- Linus Chung as Keong
- Mei Ling Tan as Mah, Ah Loong's mother
- Ida Nerina as Mak, Orked's mother
- Harith Iskander as Abah, Orked's father
- Adibah Noor as Kak Yam
- Kar Hoong Thor as Pah, Ah Loong's father
- Zehan Marissa as Lin

== Awards ==
Year	Award	Category	Recipients	Result
2005	18th Tokyo International Film Festival	Best Asian Film Award		Won
2005	Ninth Malaysian Video Awards	Best Film		Won
2005	27th Créteil International Women's Film Festival in France	Best Film		Won
2005	18th Malaysia Film Festival	Best Film		Won
2005	18th Malaysia Film Festival	Best Original Screenplay	Yasmin Ahmad	Won
2005	18th Malaysia Film Festival	Best Supporting Actress	Ida Nerina	Won
2005	18th Malaysia Film Festival	Best Supporting Actress	Adibah Noor	Nominated
2005	18th Malaysia Film Festival	Most Promising Actor	Ng Choo Seong	Won
2005	18th Malaysia Film Festival	Most Promising Actress	Sharifah Amani	Won
2005	18th Malaysia Film Festival	Best Poster		Won
2005	18th Malaysia Film Festival	Best Director	Yasmin Ahmad	Won
2005	18th Malaysia Film Festival	Best Supporting Actor	Harith Iskander	Nominated
2005	18th Malaysia Film Festival	Best Editor	Affandi Jamaludin	Nominated
2005	Global Chinese Golden Arts Awards	Best Film		Won
2005	Anugerah Era	Best Film		Won

== Sequels ==
The sequel to Sepet, called Gubra, was filmed in Ipoh, Malaysia and released in 2006. The third movie in Yasmin Ahmad's Orked trilogy is a prequel to both Sepet and Gubra, titled Mukhsin.

== Adaptations ==
Theatre company Liver & Lung debuted a musical adaptation of Sepet in September 2019. Shafeeq Shajahan directed the adaptation, with music and lyrics by Shajahan and Badrish. The adaptation was a critical success, winning Best Direction at the BOH Cameronian Arts Awards in 2020. Joshua Anthony Gui and Badrika Baluch played the roles of Jason and Orked in the adaptation, receiving positive reviews. Theatre critic website Critic Republic wrote that the musical had an "unexpected quality, where audiences all cried, laughed and smiled together."

Songs from the musical were released on Spotify in July 2021, to celebrate Yasmin Ahmad's 12 year death anniversary.
