= Gubra =

2006 film by Yasmin Ahmad

Gubra Anxiety
- Official theatrical poster
- Directed by: Yasmin Ahmad
- Written by: Yasmin Ahmad
- Produced by: Elyna Shukri; Wan Shahidi Abdullah; Nan Salleh
- Starring: Sharifah Amani; Ida Nerina; Harith Iskander; Adibah Noor ms:Adlin Aman Ramlee; Alan Yun; Nam Ron; Norkhiriah; Ng Choo Seong
- Cinematography: Low Keong
- Edited by: Affandi Jamaludin
- Music by: Hardesh Singh, Pete Teo
- Distributed by: Golden Village Entertainment; Lighthouse Pictures
- Release date: 2 March 2006
- Running time: 109 minutes
- Country: Malaysia
- Languages: English; Malay; Cantonese; Hokkien; Mandarin

Gubra (English: Anxiety) is a 2006 Malaysian Malay-language romantic drama film directed by Yasmin Ahmad. It was shot in 14 days in Ipoh, Malaysia. It is the sequel to Sepet, and was followed by Mukhsin.

The title is a word in the local Penang or Kedahan variant of Malay used mainly used by the mamak community meaning "worry". The film was titled "Anxiety" for overseas markets.

== Synopsis ==
The story plot of Gubra is set a few years after Orked's romance with Jason, where she is married to Ariff, a man who is very much older than her. Orked fools around with Ariff in the bathroom early one morning to be interrupted by her mother Mak Inom yelling of Orked's "abah (father)" Pak Atan in great danger -presumed from diabetic complications- and the whole family, with their maid Kak Yam and chauffeur Anuar, frantically rushed him to the hospital.

At the hospital, Orked incidentally meets Alan, the elder brother of Jason, who recognised her from the photos that Jason and Orked took together during their rendezvous. Alan's father was also hospitalised due to a broken leg after his mother pushed him down the doorstep in annoyance. Alan was divorced from his Singaporean wife in this story and had his six-year-old daughter in his custody. In the midst of the 'reunion', Kak Yam gets romantically involved with one of the hospital's male nurses, while Orked discovered, again, that Ariff had been seeing another lady, Latifah, behind her back (though this is not the first time as Orked mentions, "You don't have to worry about breaking up our marriage, it's on the rocks anyway."). She moves back to her family home and had Alan bring her to his house where she tearfully retrieves memento items of her days with Jason, including photos and several Jason's Chinese poetry books, which Alan had kept away secretly for fear that his mother will secure them tightly in remembrance of her deceased son.

The finale of the story sees Alan's parents reconciling after years of quarrels and fights by praying together before a Chinese altar and Alan and his daughter performing their solemn vows in a church. At the end of the credits, Orked is seen snuggling beside a topless Jason, both wearing their wedding rings.

The movie also features a side story of Fatimah "Temah" Zakaria, a Malay-Muslim lady who is not well-versed in the Quran and works as a prostitute with a sidekick/friend, Kiah. She is very fond and caring of her son Shahrin, who is hinted to be born out of wedlock. Shahrin is sent to the house of Temah's religious friend Mas for Quranic lessons under Mas' son who is Adam's religious teacher. Mas' husband is a muezzin who also shares a neighbourly and friendly bond with Temah. Mas' husband even helps retrieve Temah's wallet when her former boyfriend, who is hinted to be the father of Shahrin, stole her wallet to get more money to settle his gambling debts with loan sharks. Meanwhile, Temah goes for blood tests at a polyclinic where she discovered that she had contracted HIV. Fearful and remorseful, she requests for Mas to teach her the Quran and Mas also teaches her how to perform her prayers.

== Cryptics ==
- Shahrin related to Temah how he had dreamt of her sitting on a swing crying. This revealed that Shahrin had somehow foreshadowed the scene where Temah was sitting on a swing pouring out her sorrow of having contracting HIV to Mas and Kiah.
- During Alan's drive with Orked to find a nice place to have breakfast, some of the lines in their conversation alluded to how the Malaysian government is deemed to lack sincere appreciation towards the country's cultural and racial diversity through its policies, as portrayed by the line "it's like loving someone who doesn't love you back".
- The church scene at the end was shot at St. John's Church in Ipoh, Perak.

== See also ==
- List of films featuring diabetes
