= Mukhsin =

2007 film by Yasmin Ahmad

- Directed by: Yasmin Ahmad
- Produced by: Ahmad Puad Onah
- Starring: Sharifah Aryana; Syafie Naswip; Adibah Noor
- Edited by: Affandi Jamaluddin
- Music by: Hardesh Singh
- Distributed by: Grand Brilliance
- Release date: 26 October 2006
- Running time: 95 minutes
- Country: Malaysia
- Languages: Malay; English; Mandarin
- Budget: MYR 1 million
- Box office: MYR 1,963,000

Mukhsin is a 2006 Malaysian Malay-language romantic drama film directed by Yasmin Ahmad. It is the third instalment in the "Orked" trilogy. Shot in just 12 days, it won one award and one special mention at the 57th Berlin International Film Festival (2007) under the children's film category: International Jury of Generation Kplus - Grand Prix of the Deutsches Kinderhilfswerk for Best Feature Film and the Generation Kplus Children's Jury Awards - Special Mention. Within the first 4 days of its release in Malaysia, it earned RM700,000 in box-office takings. It went on to have a final gross of almost RM2 million.

== Plot ==
The story takes place in Sekinchan, Sabak Bernam in 1993, revolving around the first love of a 10-year-old Orked when a 12-year-old boy, Mukhsin, comes with his older brother and aunt to spend the school holidays in her village.

Around this relatively simple plotline of a blossoming young romance between the film's two young protagonists, are interweaved scenes of Malaysian village life and the dynamics of different types of families. Most of the family scenes revolve around Orked, her parents Mak Inom and Pak Atan, and the family's close maid Kak Yam who is almost like a family member.

The other families which are given attention in the movie are Mukhsin's family (with his elder brother who has lost his way in life and is trying desperately to find their mother who abandoned them at a young age, and their Aunty who is trying to take care of the two boys as though they were her own), and Orked's neighbours (with the young daughter and pregnant mother who are critical of the western ways of Orked's family, while they themselves are hurt by the father who wants to abandon them to take on a second wife).

== Cast ==
- Mukhsin - Syafie Naswip
- Orked - Sharifah Aryana
- Mak Inom - Sharifah Aleya Binti Syed Zainal Rashid Yahya
- Kak Yam - Adibah Noor
- Pak Atam - Irwan Iskandar
- Adult Orked - Sharifah Amani
- Husin - Taiyuddin Bakar

== Music ==
- "Keroncong Hujan", performed by Adibah Noor
- "Ne me quitte pas" (Don't leave me) by Nina Simone
