= Yasmin Ahmad =

Malaysian film director

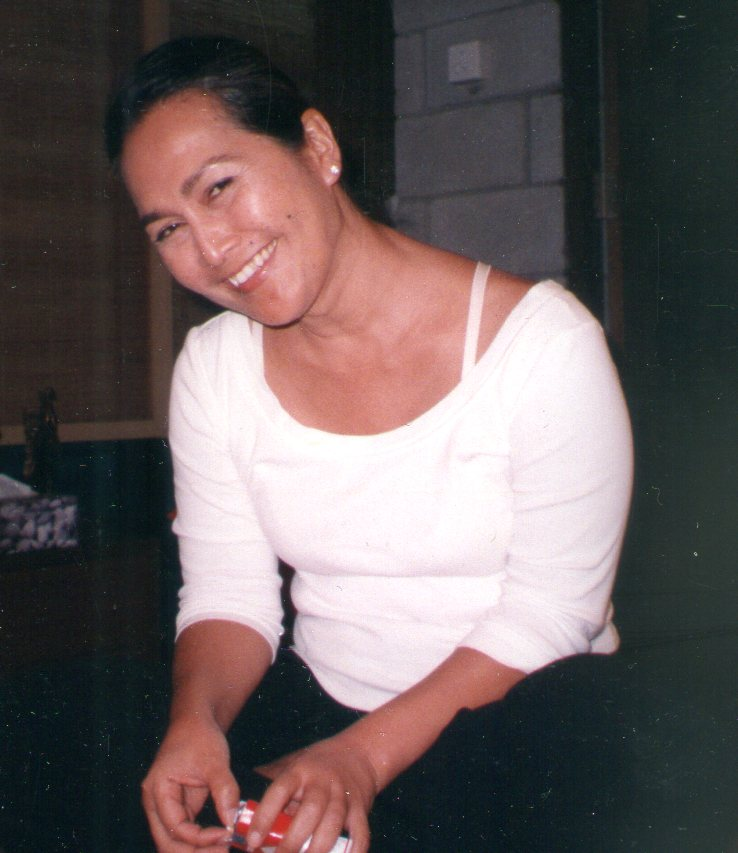
- Yasmin in 2006
- Born: Yasmin binti Ahmad; 7 January 1958; Kampung Bukit Treh, Muar, Johor, Federation of Malaya (now Malaysia)
- Died: 25 July 2009 (aged 51); Damansara Specialist Hospital, Petaling Jaya, Selangor, Malaysia
- Occupations: Film director, film writer, scriptwriter
- Years active: 1993–2009
- Spouse: Tan Yew Leong (m. 2003–2009)
- Parents: Ahmad Hashim (father); Inom Yon (mother)

Yasmin binti Ahmad (7 January 1958 – 25 July 2009) was a Malaysian film director, writer and scriptwriter. She was the executive creative director at Leo Burnett Kuala Lumpur. Her television commercials and films are well known in Malaysia for being humorous and touching. Her work crossed cross-cultural barriers, particularly her ads for Petronas, the national oil and gas company. Her works have won multiple awards both within Malaysia and internationally. In Malaysia, her films were highly controversial due to their depiction of events and relationships, which have been considered 'forbidden' by social conservatives, especially hard-line interpretations of Islam. She was a central figure of the "first" New Wave of Malaysian cinema.

== Early life ==
Yasmin was born in Kampung Bukit Treh in Muar, Johor, on 7 January 1958. A graduate in arts majoring in politics and psychology from Newcastle University in England, she worked as a trainee banker in 1982 for two weeks and then worked for IBM as a marketing representative. Meanwhile, she moonlighted as a blues singer and pianist by night. Yasmin began her career in advertising as a copywriter at Ogilvy & Mather and in 1993 she moved to Leo Burnett as joint creative director with Ali Mohammed, eventually rising to executive creative director at the firm's Kuala Lumpur branch.

== Career ==
Her first feature-length film was Rabun in 2003. Mukhsin won an international children's best feature film award and a special mention under the children's film category. Most of her commercials and films have been screened at the Berlin, San Francisco, Singapore international film festivals and the Cannes Lions International Advertising Festival (not to be confused with the other Cannes Film Festival). Her films were featured in a special retrospective at the 19th Tokyo International Film Festival in October 2006. An April 2007 retrospective of her feature films was sponsored by the Center for Southeast Asian Studies, University of Hawaii, and the Honolulu Academy of Arts. In Singapore, Yasmin is best known for the pro-family commercials she created for the Ministry of Community Development, Youth and Sports. Yasmin was inducted into the Malaysian Advertising Hall of Fame by the Association of Accredited Advertising Agents Malaysia in November 2008. Yasmin was working on her first feature film to be filmed in Singapore, titled "Go, Thaddeus!" when she died. This was to be an inspirational film for the 2010 Youth Olympic Games, based on the book, "Running the full distance: Thaddeus Cheong" by Belinda Wee. The book was about a 17-year-old National triathlete from Singapore who died after completing the 2007 Southeast Asian Games time trial.

== Death ==
On 23 July 2009, Yasmin suffered a stroke. According to news reports, she remained motionless, seated, she was resting her head on the table, with her hands cupping her face, while attending a meeting with local artist Siti Nurhaliza and her husband Khalid Mohamad Jiwa, and Media Prima representatives for an undisclosed project at Sri Pentas, TV3. Before the meeting, she spent some time with Media Prima's group creative director, Peter Chin and was reported to be in a jovial and relaxed mood.

She was rushed to the Damansara Specialist Hospital where she underwent a neurosurgery procedure to reduce the swelling in her brain. The operation was a success and her condition was critical but stable. Bernama quoted her brother-in-law, Zakaria Zahari, as saying that Yasmin had suffered a stroke and haemorrhaging in the brain.

On 25 July 2009, more than 48 hours after the surgery, Yasmin Ahmad succumbed to her injury and was pronounced dead at 11:25 pm. The next day, Yasmin was laid to rest at the USJ 22 Muslim Cemetery in Subang Jaya, Selangor. Her husband, Abdullah Tan Yew Leong, their immediate families, hundreds of fans, friends, and industry colleagues and personalities gathered to bid her farewell.

== Legacy ==
Singaporean playwright Alfian Sa'at wrote for The Online Citizen not long after Yasmin's death that her movies resounded with Malay Singaporean audiences who felt represented seeing themselves in a multicultural society "underserved by a Sinocentric local media".

=== Tributes ===
In 2010, one year after Yasmin's death, Kevin Bathman, a Malaysian visual artist who resides in Sydney, opened a digital art exhibition and film screening, named In Her Own Words: A Celebration of Humanity and Universal Love, as a tribute to Yasmin's life and legacy. Using Yasmin's own blog as inspiration, Kevin had blended her own words with striking visual images to create an art series as progressive as Yasmin's own thoughts. Bathman was so inspired by Yasmin's outlook on life and her inspirational body of work, that he devoted his expertise to paying tribute to one of Malaysia's visionary figures. The exhibition was launched in Kuala Lumpur Performing Arts Centre from 5 to 18 July 2010. The exhibition later held further tours in other places on the same year, such as The Arts House, Singapore from 27 to 31 August, and Australian Centre for the Moving Image (ACMI) in Melbourne from 2 to 6 October.

CausewayEXchange (CEX), an inter-Asia art exchange programme has also worked closely with Yasmin's sister Orked Ahmad on their past installations in Singapore. In 2010 CEX showcased a Poster Exhibition entitled "in Her Words" by Kevin Bathman as well as a 120-minute screening of a compilation of all advertisements produced by Yasmin Ahmad. This was followed by a talk by Orked. In 2012, CEX showcased Yasmin's first telemovie and one of her earlier works, Rabun. In conjunction with the screening, CEX and Orked Yasmin launched a book entitled "Yasmin, How you know?" in Singapore. Both the movie screening and the books were immediately sold out.

On 7 January 2014, Google paid tribute to Yasmin by publishing a Doodle bearing her image. This was the first time a Malaysian figure was honoured on its search engine.

In October 2014, a commemorative museum, named Yasmin at Kong Heng, opened in Ipoh, Malaysia. It features Yasmin's photography, filmography, as well as creations dedicated to her by other artists. There are plans to create an augmented reality series for the museum, using the city's landmarks where Yasmin shot her films.

== Filmography ==
=== Films ===
Year	Title	Original title	Director	Producer	Writer	Notes
2003	My Failing Eyesight	Rabun	Yes	No	Yes	
2005	Slit Eyes	Sepet	Yes	No	Yes	
2006	Anxiety	Gubra	Yes	No	Yes	
2007	Mukhsin		Yes	No	Yes	
2008	The Convert	Muallaf	Yes	No	Yes	
2009	Talentime		Yes	No	Yes	

=== Acting roles ===
Year	Title	Role	Notes
2003	Min	Teacher	
2004	15 Puasa		Telemovie
2006	Rain Dogs		
2008	Here in My Home		Video short
2008	Susuk	Nurse	Cameo
2009	At the End of Daybreak		
2009	15Malaysia	Teacher	segment "House"

=== Commercials and short films ===
- Petronas TV Commercial (for Chinese New Year, Hari Raya, Deepavali & National Day)
- Yuzy (2000) Petronas Road Safety Campaign
- Vas Dentures (2000) Celcom
- The Amber Sexalogy (2006)
- Tan Hong Ming in Love (2007) Petronas Merdeka Day commercial
- Family (2008) for the Singaporean Ministry of Community Development, Youth and Sports
- Funeral (2009) for the Singaporean Ministry of Community Development, Youth and Sports
- Chocolate (2009) for 15Malaysia (released posthumously 19 Aug 2009)

== Awards and nominations ==
=== Malaysia Video Awards ===
- 1999: for Best Director – Forgiving Petronas commercial
- 2000: Silver Award for Best Scriptwriting - Yuzy Petronas Road Safety Campaign
- 2000: Bronze Award for Best Scriptwriting - Vas Dentures for Celcom

=== Malaysia Film Festival ===
- 2005: Most Original Story and Best Film - Sepet
- 2006: Best Screenplay and Best Film - Gubra
- 2009: for Best Director - Talentime

=== Other awards ===
- Association of Accredited Advertising Agents Malaysia's Golden Kancil Award for Best Advertising Agency (1999/2000)
- Berlin International Film Festival International Jury of Generation Kplus – Grand Prix of the Deutsches Kinderhilfswerk for Best Feature Film and Generation Kplus Children's Jury Awards – Special Mention (2007) for Mukhsin
- 54th Asia Pacific Film Festival Best Director (2010) for Muallaf (The Convert)
- 18th Tokyo International Film Festival Best Asian Film Award (2005) for Sepet
- Cannes Lions International Advertising Festival 2008 Gold Winner for Petronas advertisement Tan Hong Ming in Love
