= Paloh (film) =

- Directed by: Adman Salleh
- Written by: Al Jafree Md Yusop
- Produced by: Jurey Latiff Rosli
- Starring: Janet Khoo; Nam Ron
- Distributed by: Filem Negara Malaysia; National Film Development Corporation Malaysia (FINAS)
- Release date: 10 July 2003 (Malaysia)
- Country: Malaysia
- Languages: Malay; Mandarin; Cantonese
- Budget: MYR 4.01 million
- Box office: MYR 140,000

Paloh is a 2003 Malaysian Malay-language historical drama film directed by Adman Salleh. It is a second feature film co-produced by Filem Negara Malaysia and the National Film Development Corporation Malaysia (FINAS) after Embun (2002). This film is rated 18PL for strong brutal violence and terror throughout, sexual assaults, gruesome images and pervasive strong language.

== Plot ==
Set in the small town of Paloh, Johor, during the final days of the Japanese occupation in 1944, the movie is about the confrontation between the Japanese occupying force and the Communist Party of Malaya. To survive, four friends - Ahmad, Osman, Puteh and Harun choose to serve the Japanese Police Force. Amidst a sea of uncertainties, Ahmad falls in love with Siew Lan and Puteh falls in love with Fatimah - both girls from different worlds, different cultures, even opposing sides. And Osman - a friend of theirs and a spy for the Japanese Police - chooses to serve his own agenda. Swee Lan's father is a local leader of the Bintang Tiga sympathizers and has asked Swee Lan to establish a love relationship with Ahmad so as to gather intelligence of the Japanese movements. However, Swee Lan really falls in love with Ahmad and thus begins a deep struggle within her. She has to either obey her father or betray her lover. Ahmad, on the other hand, sees the high handedness of the Japanese and he does not want to be a part of the Japanese scheme any more.

The tension of the crisis at its peak when local commie invaded Paloh Kempeitai Station and killed those local Malay who served for them including Ahmad close friend, Puteh. Unsatisfied with Swee Lan father that broke his promise, Ahmad came in and gun shot happened with Osman now serve in communies killed her father thus save Ahmad from dead. Osman did that because his long revenge over the dead of his father in Ah Meng hand.

As one character says in the movie, "Whether it is the British, the Japanese or the communist, they are all the same."

== Cast ==
- Janet Khoo as Siew Lan, Ahmad love interest, worked at the Kempetai dobby laundry. Some said she is a Chinese, the other believe that she's a Korean. Trapped in conflict between she's loyalty to ahmad or her pro communist family.
- Nam Ron as Ahmad, A Malay guy who join Kempetai to make end meets. Not because of his patriotism. He doesn't care about Communist or Japanese or British ideology.
- Gibran Agi as Osman, Ahmad close friend who come from mixed parentage. His father is a Chinese and Malay mother. He also interested in pursuing a career in Journalism. Worked as a spy for Japanese in Communist movement.
- Ellie Suriati as Fatimah, A daughter of Ariffin Nor, who worked at the kempetai station as maid, laundry girl.
- Hasnul Rahmat as Puteh, Ahmad friend, he love traditional Zapin dance wherever local kampung having a feast.
- Ani Maiyuni as Azizah, Ahmad sister
- Thor Kah Hong as Ah Meng
- Steve Ng Boon Cheng as Ah Keong
- A. Samad Salleh as Ariffin Nor, Fatimah father, having a great knowledge about medical herb. He treated Swee Lan after she drinking gasoline in a suicide attempt. Philosopher
- Rohani Yusuff as Halimayung
- Meoki Tong May Lan as Lan Siew Lai
- Kamaliah Mat Dom as Mak Lang
- Adlin Aman Ramlie as Sergeant Jumlay, kempetai station in charge Sergeant, who being able to speak and understood Japanese.
- Lee Yoke Lan as Guat Yu
- Zack Taipan as Captain Kim Jung
- Adam Corrie Lee as Wong
- Yalal Chin as Hassan, father Ahmad, father who being tired of picking a side during Japanese occupation
- M. Amin as Local villagers who didn't impressed with the presence of local Malay joining Kempetai. Also having a talent in performing Malay musical instrument during wedding.
- Soffi Jikan as Harun, Ahmad friend at the Kempetai station.
- Yusmal Ghazali as Sergeant Hussin
- Lando Zawawi as Captain Kim Jung Bodyguard

== Reception ==
The movie flopped, with some attributing it to the heavy and sensitive topics, claiming that viewers walked out of cinemas "furious". Other reviewers commented that the audience was not used to the non-linear method of storytelling, which required more intellectual engagement from the viewers. Independent film critic Nizam Zakaria dismissed viewers’ complaints that ‘Paloh’ is difficult to understand and boring, claiming that "the film is ambitious and viewers had no patience".

The production of the movie itself was fraught with difficulties. Feuds broke out and led to the sacking of director Adman Salleh by supervising producer Jurey Latiff Rosli, although he was later reinstated after FINAS, the National Film Development Corp that funded the movie, intervened.

In response to the critics who commented on the confusion from the non-linear timeline, Adman clarified: “Many people did not realise that after I was rehired, I only managed to do three things – reedit the fine cut, complete the dubbing process and give some ideas on the concept of music for Paloh.” According to Adman, even as the film’s director and screenplay writer, he was not allowed to oversee the final mixing of sound effects, music and dialogues and "marry all these three into check print in the form of audio and picture", leading to confusion and "technical errors", which he requested he be allowed to rectify before the film was submitted for screening at the Asia-Pacific Film Festival in Iran that October.

There was also controversy over the origin of its theme song sung by pop queen Siti Nurhaliza, entitled "Tetap Di Sini". The song was a three-year-old composition by musician Hadi Hassan but the movie credited another songwriter, "Aiman". Aiman, whose real name is Zulkifli Majid, claimed that the song was sent to him through the mail and not credited to anyone as the composer, and they decided to use "Aiman" as the composer, "hoping that the real composer will own up". The royalty and compensation that was due to Hadi Hassan was addressed and the credit title was amended.

Paloh was unlike any other historical films in that it attempted historical and social accuracy. The Chinese characters spoke in Mandarin, Hokkien, and broken Malay, and the entire film was subtitled in English.

== Awards ==
Paloh grabbed six awards including Best Director and Best Film at the 17th Malaysian Film Festival in 2004. The filmmakers won cash prize worth RM25,000 for the Best Film category.
