= Hamzah Sulaiman =

Bruneian politician

Dato Seri Setia Hamzah Sulaiman PSNB DPMB PIKB PJK
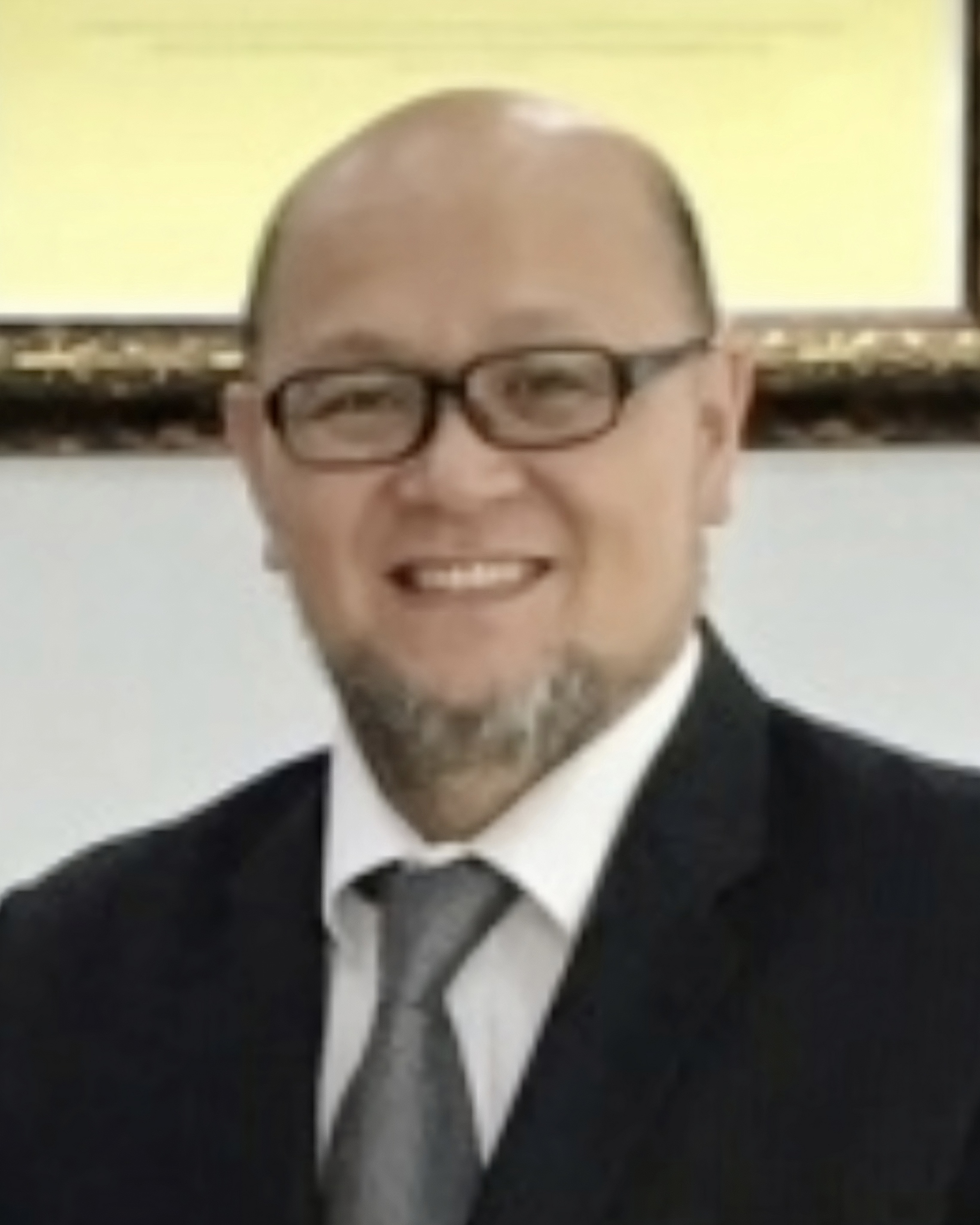
- Minister Hamzah in 2018

5th Minister of Education
- In office 29 January 2018 – 7 June 2022
- Monarch: Hassanal Bolkiah
- Deputy: Romaizah Salleh
- Preceded by: Suyoi Osman
- Succeeded by: Romaizah Salleh

Personal details
- Born: Brunei
- Education: Universiti Brunei Darussalam (BA); State University of New York (MA)
- Profession: Politician; research analyst

Hamzah bin Haji Sulaiman is a Bruneian politician who formerly held the position of Minister of Education (MOE) from 2018 to 2022. Additionally, he is also the chairman of Universiti Teknologi Brunei (UTB).

== Early life and education ==
Hamzah graduated from Universiti Brunei Darussalam (UBD) in 1991 with a BA (Hons) in public policy and administration. He then joined the civil service as a research analyst at the Ministry of Defence (MOD). In 1995, he graduated with a Master of Arts (MA) in Political science from the State University of New York, Albany. He began working for UBD's Department of Public Policy and Administration in 1993. From 2001 to 2005, he served as the department's head, and from 2005 onward, he served as the Institute of Policy Studies, UBD's first head.

== Political career ==
Hamzah returned to the MOD in 2007 in a new position as the Sultan Haji Hassanal Bolkiah Institute of Defence and Strategic Studies' Director. In the Ministry of Finance (MOF), he was appointed as a Senior Special Duties Officer four years later. In 2012, he was given the position of Director of Research and International Division, where he was in charge of managing Brunei's international relations with organizations like ASEAN, ASEAN+3, APEC, the IMF, World Bank, Islamic Development Bank, and Asian Development Bank as well as conducting economic research. 2013 saw his appointment to the MOD's position of Deputy Permanent secretary (Defence policy and Development). He was assigned to the position of Permanent Secretary (International, Economic planning and Development and Finance), currently known as the Economic and Finance Division, Prime Minister's Office, a year later, in 2014. During a cabinet reshuffle on 30 January 2018, he was appointed to serve as the Minister of Education. On 7 June 2022, Hamzah would be succeeded by Datin Romaizah Mohd Salleh after a cabinet reshuffle.

=== IESCO ===
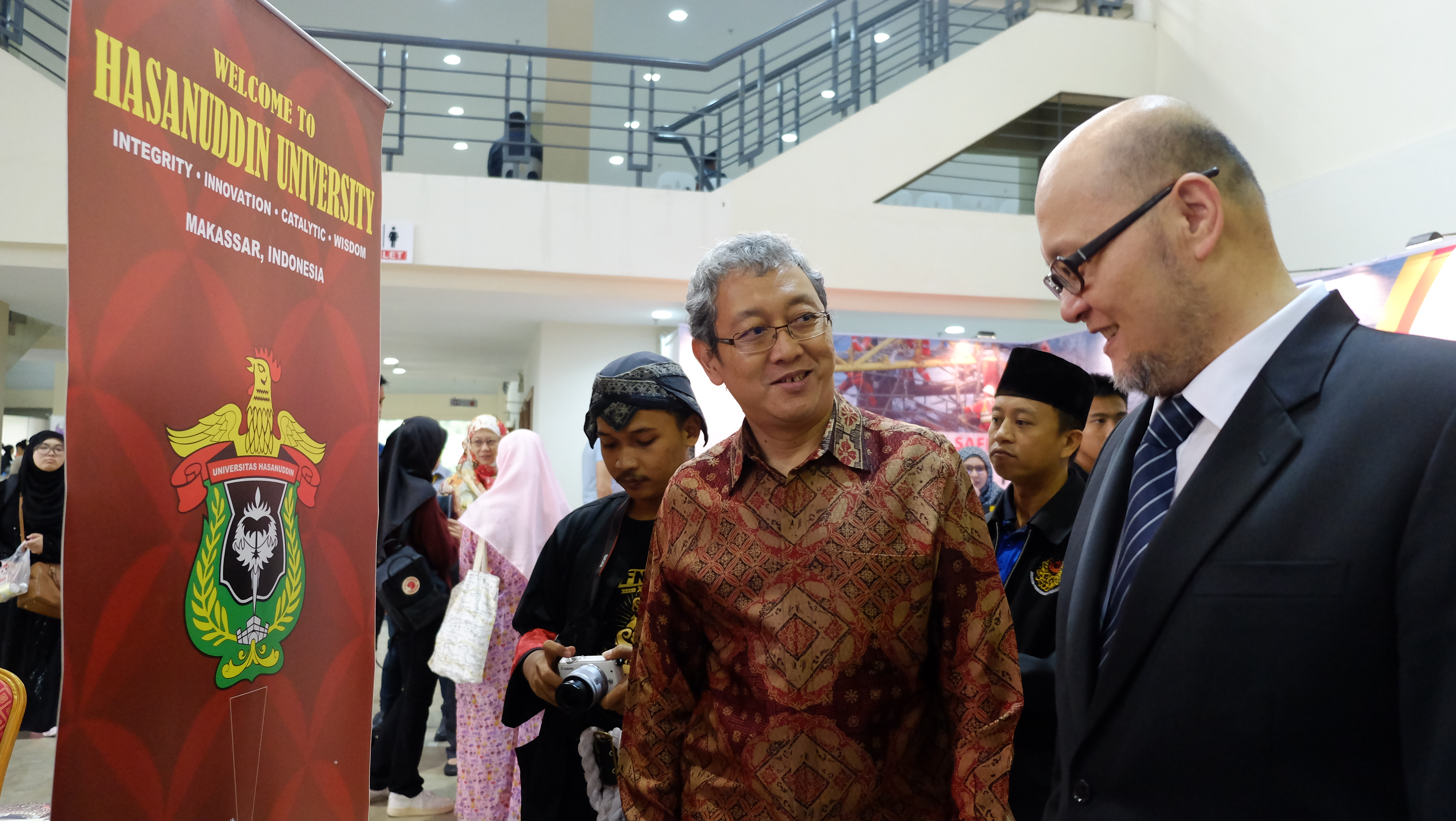
The third event of the annual Higher Education Expo was officiated by Hamzah in 2018.

In a meeting with Sulaiman, Salim M. Al-Malik, Director general of the Islamic Educational, Scientific and Cultural Organization (ISESCO), reaffirmed its desire to expand cooperation with Brunei. He praised the celebration of Bandar Seri Begawan as the 2019 Capital of Islamic Culture as well as the programs and activities carried out and planned as part of the celebration. The parties also decided to keep working to make Brunei a frequent location for hosting international symposia and some ministerial conferences that fall under the purview of ISESCO. This cooperation will be promoted in the areas of education, science, technology, and culture.

=== COVID-19 ===
According to Sulaiman, in May 2020, parents would be able to "negotiate with school leaders" over whether to enable their children to resume in-person instruction or continue with online courses, while schools would have the last say about student enrollment. After an 11-week total closure for students taking examinations, schools will resume on 2 June for the first group of students in what has been referred to as a partial restart.

According to Dato Hamzah Sulaiman, the National Vaccination Program for COVID-19 will begin on 8 November 2021, for 38,201 pupils between the ages of 12 and 17. He also said that the MOH and MOE would collaborate closely to immunize the pupils. All youngsters in the nation between the ages of 12 and 17 are entitled to receive the COVID-19 vaccine, according to Hamzah. All schools under the control of the MOE, the Ministry of Religious Affairs (MORA), and private institutions, including international schools, will be covered by the initiative. He also stated that the usage of digital technology has recently undergone a significant shift in response to the recent global COVID-19 epidemic, and the demand for digital skills has increased significantly, especially so in particular areas.

==== ASEMME8 ====
The 8th Asia-Europe Ministers of Education Meeting (ASEMME8) was held virtually on 15 December 2021, and Hamzah spoke during the Round Table Session – Commitment of Ministers and Stakeholders to Support the ASEAN 2030 Education Strategy. He also mentioned that the Brunei's MOE has established a Lifelong Learning Center as a crucial tool for giving all students access to opportunities for education, training, and skill development to improve their marketability in the ever-evolving market.

According to Hamzah, in-person schooling will start on 14 May 2022, for students between the ages of five and eleven. The decision to restart face-to-face schooling for the age group was decided after taking into account the falling trend of COVID-19 infections across the nation, the minister said, adding that 50,000 students are anticipated to return to school. According to him, this occurred at the same time as the second term of classes at educational institutions run by the MOE and MORA.

== Initiatives ==
Progresif and the MOE formed a year-long cooperation on 29 September 2020, with the goal of advancing teaching and learning activities inside the educational system. A Memorandum of understanding (MoU) establishing "Progresif for Schools," a multifaceted collaborative program created to meet the common goal of ensuring the success of Brunei's youth in meeting the educational demands of the 21st century, was signed by Hamzah and Nurul Haniah Jaafar, CEO of Progresif, at a signing ceremony held at the Progresif Headquarters. Dr. Shamsiah Zuraini Kanchanawati, the Permanent Secretary of Core Education, was also present.

To ensure that students have equitable access to high-quality education and technological knowledge, Hamzah shared some of Brunei's most important educational initiatives. He also emphasized the necessity for educators to keep up with technological advancements associated with the Fourth Industrial Revolution to deliver high-quality education to students. On 11 May 2022, the minister also mentioned how the Ministry of Education (MoE) is constantly working to close disparity gaps to remain adaptable and pertinent to the nature of work in the future for the overall growth of the economy, emphasizing the significance of enhancing and molding human capital in accordance with the dynamics of the global market.

By ensuring accessible and equitable quality education and encouraging opportunities for lifelong learning for all, education is important in achieving the Sustainable Development Goals. Building resilient infrastructure, promoting inclusive and sustainable industrialisation, and fostering innovation are some of the goals of the Sustainable Development Goals, according to Dato Hamzah. He noted that the award fosters creative attitudes in the nation and the region while speaking at the Crown Prince Creative, Innovative Product and Technological Advancement, CIPTA Award 2023 Launching Ceremony.

== Honours ==
Hamzah has earned the following honours;

- Order of Setia Negara Brunei First Class (PSNB; 15 July 2018) – Dato Seri Setia
- Order of Seri Paduka Mahkota Brunei Second Class (DPMB; 15 July 2017) – Dato Paduka
- Excellent Service Medal (PIKB; 2005)
- Meritorious Service Medal (PJK; 2016)

Political offices
Preceded by Suyoi Osman	5th Minister of Education; 29 January 2018 – 7 June 2022	Succeeded by Romaizah Salleh
