= Gema Dari Menara =

1968 Bruneian film

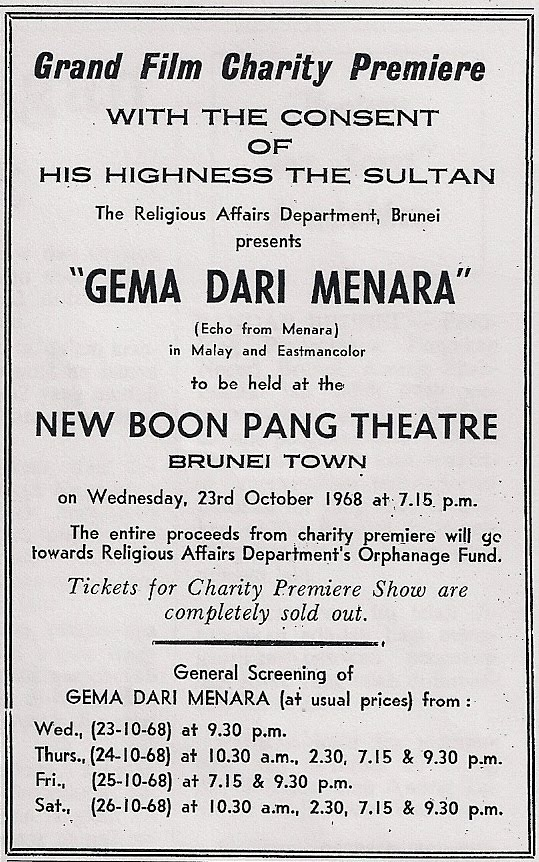
- Newspaper ad
- Directed by: Mohasbi Ahmad
- Screenplay by: Harun Md. Dom; Mohasbi Ahmad
- Story by: Abdul Saman Kahar
- Produced by: Pengiran Anak Kemaluddin; Othman Hafsham (Note: Othman Hafsham is credited as assistant producer. As the film's associate producer, he is credited under his birth name, Osman Hj. Shamsuddin.)
- Starring: Pengiran Abbas P.H. Besar; Harun Md. Dom; Jamaliah Abu
- Cinematography: Mohd Rosli Hussain
- Edited by: Mohasbi Ahmad
- Music by: Saiful Bahri
- Production companies: Brunei Religious Affairs Department; Filem Negara Malaysia
- Release date: 23 October 1968
- Running time: 80 minutes
- Country: Brunei
- Language: Bruneian Malay
- Budget: $140,000,00

Gema Dari Menara (Echoes From the Minaret) is a 1968 Bruneian documentary drama film directed by Mohasbi Ahmad, who is also served as screenwriter and editor. Released on 23 October 1968, the film is produced by Brunei Religious Affairs Department in association with Filem Negara Malaysia (FNM). It is Brunei's first feature film and the last until the release of Ada Apa Dengan Rina, 45 years later, in 2013. A copy of the film is stored at the National Film Development Corporation Malaysia (FINAS).

== Plot ==
Set in 1960s Brunei, the film takes a look at the changes Brunei has undergone through its oil wealth, and the conflict between the younger generation, the West and their more conservative parents, with a focus on one family and how they react to the changing times.

== Cast ==
- Pengiran Abbas P.H. Besar as Azman
- Dayang Aishah Md. Noor as Shamsiah
- Abu Bakar Ahmad as Haji Bahar
- Pengiran Umi Pengiran Idrus as Che Timah
- Harun Md. Dom as Nordin
- Jamaliah Abu as Noriah
- Abd Kader Cheku as Zulkifle
- Haji Tarif P.S.W. Haji Mohd as Hassan
- Junaidi Safar as Ahmad
- Yusof Hj. Kadir as the Judge
- Salmah Ibrahim as Salmah

Additionally, Abdullah Chik and Kamariah Noor as well as Mahani Mydin portrays themselves in the film.

== Production ==
In the early 1960s, the Brunei Religious Affairs Department pitched the idea of producing what would have been Brunei's first feature film. Pengiran Anak Kemaluddin, the then-department's head, was one of the chief proponents of the project. He, with other Bruneian civil servants, flew to Kuala Lumpur to attend a photography and filmmaking course conducted by Filem Negara Malaysia. They planned to produce a film of religious propagation to address the increasing secularisation and Western influences among Bruneian citizens. Although Gema Dari Menara originated from Brunei, most of its production took place in Malaysia as Brunei didn't have its own film department or even experienced film personnel, equipment or facilities.

Filem Negara Malaysia has been produced documentaries on Brunei since 1950s, beginning with Brunei: The Abode of Peace in 1952. Gema Dari Menara was a directorial debut of Mohasbi Ahmad, a pseudonym of Mohammad Hassan – an actor, director and producer who worked for Filem Negara Malaysia. Jamaliah Abu, who is also worked for the film department, took her role as Noriah. The film's script was co-written by Mohasbi and one of the film's cast, Haron Md. Dom in standard Malay, while the original story was written by Abdul Saman Kahar and its music score was composed by Saiful Bahri, who also served as the music director.

Filming began in early 1968 and took place mostly in Brunei while its in-house production took place in Filem Negara Malaysia's soundstages in Kuala Lumpur. The film's production budget is costed at a total of $140,000,00. Cinematography was handled by Mohd Rosli Hussain with editing by Mohasbi, while the recording process was done by Mustafa Kemal and Daud Iman.

== Themes ==
Zuliana Masri, a lecturer from the University of Brunei Darussalam (UBD), noted that Gema Dari Menara contains reflections of Brunei's attempt towards constructing the Malayness identity with strict Islamic values, reinforcing a conservative, moralistic, and the "Melayu Islam Beraja" (lit. 'Malay Islamic Monarchy'; MIB) lifestyle. She highlights the Malayness aspects through dutiful characters in traditional attire and contrasts it with cautionary tales of rebellious, Westernized behavior. Likewise, she also elaborated the film's storyline emphasise a return to traditional values by portraying the rural kampung settings as a place of safety and morality than the city.

Najib Noorashid, Nur Raihan Mohamad and Ririn Kurnia Trisnawati, all from the same university, noted that Gema Dari Menara also heavily emphasise the concept of Amar Ma'ruf Nahi Mungkar (lit. 'enjoining good, forbidding evil') within the Islamic values, while embodying the spirit of da'wahism and pondering upon the causes and effects of the characters' actions and deeds. The film also highlights criticism of certain social issues such as alcohol consumption, gambling and adultery as well as the raise of secularisation in the pre-independence Brunei. They likewise noted that all transgressions and sins depicted in the film are prohibited in Islam.

== Release and reception ==
The film was released on 23 October 1968 and screened at the New Boon Pang Theatre di Bandar Seri Begawan. Tickets for the film's premiere were sold out. The entire proceeds from the film's charity premiere were donated to the Brunei Religious Affairs Department's Orpahanage Fund. It also has been screened at the National Gallery Singapore on 6 September 2016.

Gema Dari Menara celebrated its 50th anniversary on 23 October 2018. A 35 mm copy of the film is stored at the National Film Development Corporation Malaysia (FINAS) in Kuala Lumpur, Malaysia. The film's copy is previously stored at Filem Negara Malaysia before its merger with FINAS in 2013.

== See also ==
- List of Bruneian films

== Bibliography ==
- Ben Slater (July–September 2013). "Gema Dari Menara / Echoes from the Minaret: A Conversation with Mervin Espina about the Lost Cinema of Brunei" (PDF). Cinematheque Quarterly. National Museum of Singapore: 64–75.
- Masri, Zuliana (2020). "Malayness in Gema Dari Menara (1968)". Southeast Asia. 20 (2): 57–65. doi:10.1108/seamj-02-2020-b1006.
- Noorashid, Najib; Mohamad, Nur Raihan; Trisnawati, Ririn Kurnia (June 2021). "Gema Dari Menara (1968): Amar Ma'ruf Nahi Mungkar as Islamic Da'wahism in Bruneian Film". Southeast Asia. 20 (2). University of Brunei Darussalam: 66–79. doi:10.1108/SEAMJ-02-2020-B1007.
