= List of Bruneian films =

A list of films produced in Brunei from the earliest film to present. Films are listed by year of release.

== 1968-2025 ==
No.	Title	Director	Cast	Genre	Release date
1968
1.	Gema Dari Menara	Mohasbi Ahmad	Pengiran Abbas P.H. Besar, Harun Md. Dom, Jamaliah Abu	Drama	October 23
2013
2.	Ada Apa Dengan Rina	Harlif Haji Mohamad, Farid Azlan Ghani	Syukri Mahari, Tauffek Ilyas, Dayangku Moniri Pengiran Mohiddin, Haji Mohd Firdaus Haji Salleh, Norharizah Haji Sisi	Comedy	February 23
2014
3.	Yasmine	Siti Kamaluddin, Chan Man Ching	Liyana Yus, Reza Rahadian, Agus Kuncoro	Action, teen drama	August 21
2016
4.	Primajaya	Adam Groves	Hazim Hamzah, Aliff Ali, Kenny Yoong, Deewi Hamdilah	Action Superhero	September 15 2016
2018
5.	Hari Minggu Yang Ke 4	Siti Kamaluddin	Liyana Yus, Kai Anwar, Ian Zulkifli, Shafiee Mostar	Drama,	2018
2020
6.	Akademi	Siti Kamaluddin	Liyana Yus, Ian Zulkifli, Nasrul Nassar, Shafiee Mostar	Comedy,	2020
2021
7.	Intiqam	Akmal Marhain	Akmal Marhain, James Abu, Natasyah Rahim, Hj Yunus	Action Thriller	2021
2022
8.	Kopi	Zulfan Farhi, Iskandar Karim	Khai Anwar, Fatin Feisal, Selina Khooo, Nasrul Nassar	Romance, Drama	2022
2023
9.	Intiqam 2 Wira Budiman	Akmal Marhain	Akmal Marhain, Ben Roslan, Selina Khooo, Amir Rashid, Natasyah Rahim, Lana Lizros, Aini Junaidi	Action Thriller	2023
10.	Seperti Bayu	Muiz Bakar, Ariffudin Zainal	Ben Roslan, Azemah Emran, Aina Ayob, Masita Tamil	Romance, Drama	2023
2024
11.	Gadong	Pilot Ridwan	Khai Anwar, Joel Chinta	Drama,	2024
12.	Al Imam	Akmal Marhain	Hazim Hisyamuddin, Hairi Tahir, Adi Amni, Masita Tamil	Horror,	2024
13.	Waiters	Adam Groves	Hazim Hamzah, Aliff Ali	Comedy,	2024
2025
14.	Durang Hadir	Afiq Julaihi	Andie Othman, Bazla Batrisyia, Fikriyyah Mazlan, Shanesse Chong	Horror, Comedy	2025
15.	Saviour	Ariffudin Zainal	Akmal Marhain, Anisah Najihah, Nur Saila, James Abu, Danyel Shahjohan	Action, Superhero	2025
16.	Para.doc	Adam Groves	Adam Groves, Pearl Syuhada	Horror, Comedy	2025
17.	Cigu Jumat	Hj Yunus	Hj Yunus	Drama	2025
