= Romaizah Salleh =

Bruneian politician (born 1966)

Yang Berhormat Datin Seri Paduka Romaizah Salleh PSNB SPMB
- روميزة صالح
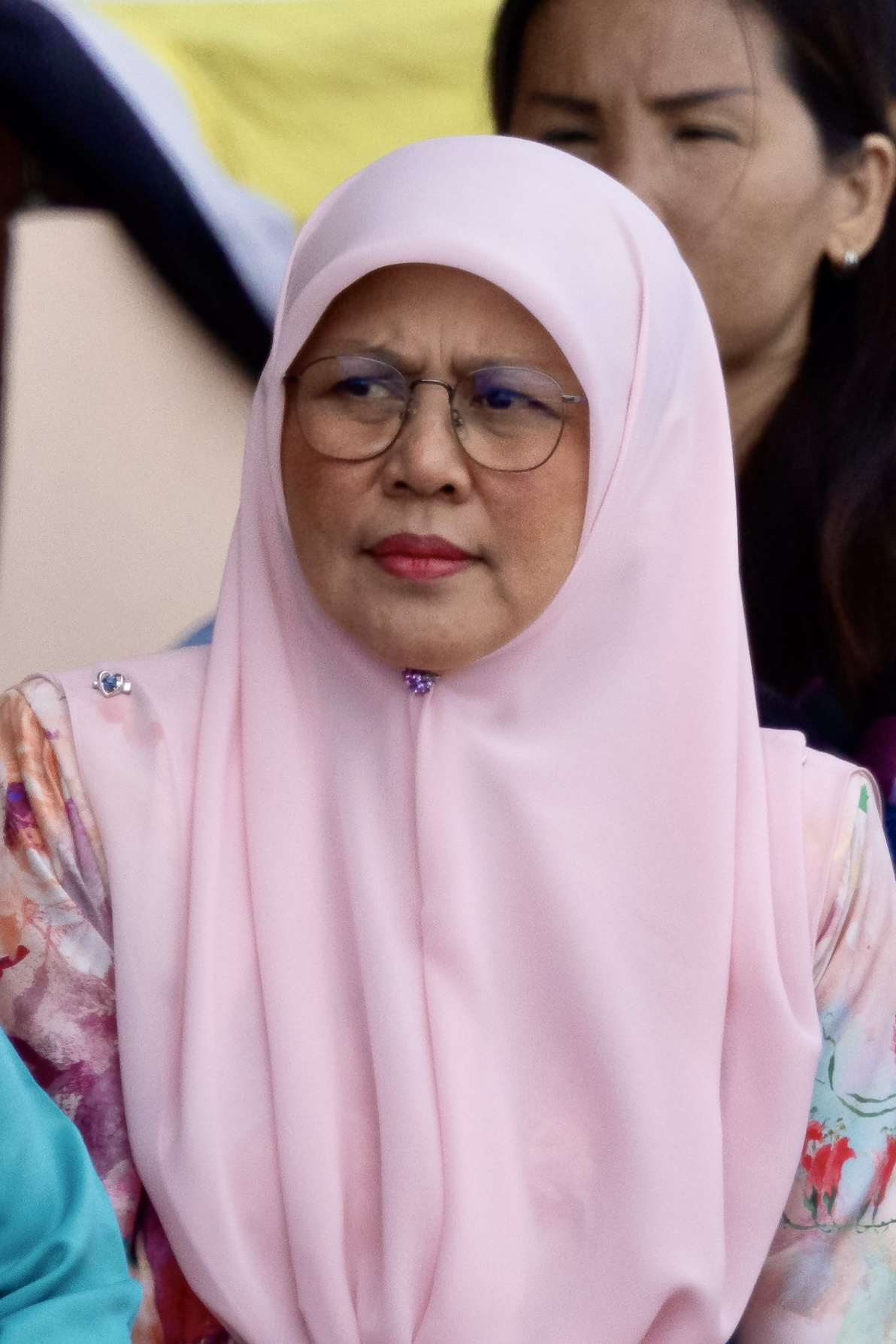
- Minister Romaizah in 2024

6th Minister of Education
- Incumbent
- Assumed office 7 June 2022
- Monarch: Hassanal Bolkiah
- Preceded by: Hamzah Sulaiman

6th Deputy Minister of Education
- In office 30 January 2018 – 7 June 2022
- Minister: Hamzah Sulaiman
- Preceded by: Pengiran Bahrom
- Succeeded by: Office abolished

Vice President of the Southeast Asian Ministers of Education Organization
- Incumbent
- Assumed office 8 February 2023
- President: Sara Duterte; Sonny Angara
- Preceded by: Leonor Briones

Personal details
- Born: 4 March 1966 (age 60) Brunei
- Education: Universiti Brunei Darussalam (BA); University of Reading (MSc); Curtin University (PhD)
- Occupation: Teacher; politician

Romaizah binti Haji Mohd Salleh (born 4 March 1966) is a Bruneian teacher and education officer that is currently the Minister of Education (MoE) since 2022, the Chairperson of Universiti Teknologi Brunei (UTB) Council members, Universiti Brunei Darussalam (UBD), and Sultan Sharif Ali Islamic University (UNISSA). She previously held the position of Deputy minister and Acting Minister of the same Ministry in 2018.

== Teaching career ==
Romaizah worked as a primary school teacher at Panchor Murai Primary School from July 1990 to January 1991, laying the foundation for her career in education. She then served as the tutor in the Department of Science and Mathematics Education from January 1991 to October 1999, and later becoming a lecturer from November 1999 to July 2005. Additionally, she undertook the role of Coordinator of Continuing Education from January 2005 to December 2006, overseeing programs aimed at professional development and lifelong learning.

As a Senior Lecturer in the Department of Science and Mathematics Education from July 2005 to November 2011, Romaizah was involved in teaching, research, and academic supervision responsibilities, contributing to the advancement of education in the field. Moreover, she served as the Head of the Department of Science and Mathematics Education from January 2007 to March 2009, leading the department's strategic initiatives and academic activities.

Romaizah was appointed as the Convenor of the Science Education Academic Group at the same institute from April 2009 to December 2009, contributing to the development and coordination of academic programs in science education. She finally began serving as the Dean of the Sultan Hassanal Bolkiah Institute of Education from January 2010 to June 2012, overseeing academic affairs and administrative responsibilities within the institute.

== Political career ==
Romaizah held key positions within the MoE, such as serving as a Director of Planning, Development and Research from December 2011 to 19 September 2013; member of the board of directors for Centre for Strategic and Policy Studies (CSPS) from 1 July 2013 to 30 June 2017; deputy permanent secretary for Core Education, deputy permanent secretary for Higher Education, and director of Planning, Development, and Research from 2 December 2014 to 27 January 2016; permanent secretary from 28 January 2016 to 29 January 2018, and acting executive director of CSPS from 19 September 2015 to 8 January 2016.

Romaizah took on significant leadership roles, including deputy chairman of Jerudong International School (JIS) from 8 June 2018; deputy chairman of the Brunei Research Council from 20 August 2018 to 10 April 2021; member of the Manpower Planning and Employment Council (MPEC) Working Committee on 3 October 2019; rejoined the board of directors for the CSPS on 1 November 2021.

Romaizah later chaired the Yayasan Sultan Haji Hassanal Bolkiah (YSHHB) Audit Committee from 26 June 2018 to 12 March 2023; board member of YSHHB School from 26 June 2018 to 12 March 2021; deputy chairman of the Board of Governors from 13 March 2021 to 12 March 2023. chairman of the governing board for Brunei Polytechnic from 1 May 2018 to 30 April 2024; Institute of Brunei Technical Education from 1 April 2018 to 31 March 2024.

== Ministerial career ==
Following a cabinet reshuffle on 30 January 2018, Romaizah was appointed a deputy minister in the Ministry of Education. Following another cabinet reshuffle on 7 June 2022, Romaizah would replace Hamzah Sulaiman as minister of education, making her the first woman to hold that position in the Bruneian government. Romaizah was chosen to serve as SEAMEO's Vice President for the 2023–2025 term on 9 February 2023.

== Honours ==
- Order of Seri Paduka Mahkota Brunei First Class (SPMB) – Datin Seri Paduka
- Order of Seri Paduka Mahkota Brunei Second Class (DPMB; 15 July 2017)
- Order of Setia Negara Brunei First Class (PSNB; 15 July 2022) – Datin Seri Setia

Political offices
Preceded by Hamzah Sulaiman	6th Minister of Education; 7 June 2022 – present	Succeeded by Incumbent
Preceded by Pengiran Bahrom	6th Deputy Minister of Education; 30 January 2018 – 7 June 2022	Succeeded by Office abolished
