= Rahim Razali =

Malaysian actor, film director, screenwriter and sports commentator

Yang Berbahagia Dato' Rahim Razali DPMP
- رحيم غزالي
- Born: Abdul Rahim bin Mohd Razali; 3 July 1939 (age 86); Batu Gajah, Perak, British Malaya (present-day Malaysia)
- Occupation(s): Actor, director, screenwriter, producer, sports commentator
- Years active: 1959–present
- Spouse: Datin Salmiah Abdul Mukmin
- Children: 3

Abdul Rahim bin Mohd Razali (born 3 July 1939), better known by his stage name Rahim Razali, is a Malaysian actor, director, screenwriter, producer and sports commentator.

== Life and career ==
He had his secondary education at Anderson Ipoh High School, Anderson School, Ipoh. He then continued studying at University of Melbourne for five years under the Chartered Accountancy under the Colombo Plan.

He worked as a broadcasting assistant at Radio Malaya, Tobacco Co. Bhd, at the Ministry of Culture, and SSC & B Lintas Sdn. Bhd and SHBenson Advertising Company's cigarette company. Then work in Fleet Communication. 1981 established the company's own Aboriginal Artist Generation XX Sdn Bhd with Wan Rohani Zain, former RTM newsreader.

Since the 1950s he has been a scriptwriter and director for drama at his school. In Australia, Rahim joined the Melbourne University Theater Dub, the Brighton Theater Group, and the Australian Broadcasting Commission. 1963, acted as a Hamlet in Hamlet, a showcase for Brighton Theatre Group. In 2010 she instructed Usman Awang's original Uda & Dara Musical. He was responsible for lining up and highlighting star-studded talents since the 70s, and his latest featured popular singer Misha Omar as a musical theater star with a balance in acting and singing.

He published 50 television dramas in RTM and ran 15 films. Since the 1960s, he joined the acting world at RTM. Since 1981 he has been nominated for 8 films and films representing the country to the Tokyo International Film Festival, the London International Film Festival and others.

Dato' Rahim is best known for his collaboration with Syamsul Yusof in the movie Munafik where he had the role of the father of Ustaz Adam. He returned to his character in his continuation which aired on 30 August 2018.

== Filmography ==
Key
| Denotes films and dramas that have not yet been released |

=== Film ===
| Year | Title | Role | Notes |
|---|---|---|---|
| 1978 | Dayang Suhana | Azman | |
| 1981 | Abang | Fuad Din | Also as director and screenwriter |
| 1981 | Sumpah Di Bumi Merkah | Panglima Lanang | |
| 1982 | Pemburu | ACP Razif | As director |
| 1984 | Matinya Seorang Patriot | — | As director and screenwriter |
| 1986 | Tsu Feh Sofiah | Nik | As director and screenwriter |
| 1987 | Puteri | — | As director and screenwriter |
| 1989 | Anak Sarawak | | As director |
| 1990 | Rentak Desa | — | As director |
| 1992 | Abang 92 | Firdaus Wahidin | As director |
| 1998 | Iman Alone | — | As director and screenwriter |
| 2002 | KL Menjerit | Senator | |
| 2002 | Embun | Pak Harun | |
| 2003 | Aku Kaya The Movie | Ketua Lanun | |
| 2004 | Puteri Gunung Ledang | Datuk Bendahara | |
| 2006 | Cinta | Cikgu Elyias | |
| 2007 | Qabil Khusry Qabil Igam | | |
| 2007 | 1957: Hati Malaya | Sheikh Abdullah Fahim | |
| 2008 | Jarum Halus | Datuk Kalel | |
| 2008 | Cuci | Tan Sri Rahim | |
| 2008 | Muallaf | Datuk | |
| 2009 | Cinta Terakhir | | |
| 2009 | Pisau Cukur | Datuk Zakaria | |
| 2010 | Andartu Terlampau...21 Hari Mencari Suami | Dr. Sheikh Muzaffar | |
| 2010 | Janin | Dato' Rahim | |
| 2010 | 4 Madu | Dato' Rahim | |
| 2011 | Hikayat Merong Mahawangsa | Kesum | |
| 2011 | Nur Kasih The Movie | Aidil old | |
| 2013 | My Beloved Dearest | Tuan Haji Harun | |
| 2013 | Malam Penuh Bermisteri | Ayah Lisa | |
| 2014 | Balistik | Deputy Marsyal Rahim | |
| 2014 | Anak Jantan | | |
| 2015 | Kapsul | Dato' Johan | |
| 2015 | Split Gravy On Rice | Bapak | |
| 2016 | Ola Bola | Rahman's | |
| 2016 | Munafik | Rahim | |
| 2017 | Soulmate Hingga Jannah | | |
| 2018 | Pulang | Jamil (90an) | |
| 2018 | Munafik 2 | Rahim | |
| 2019 | XX Ray III | Tan Sri Ismail | |
| 2019 | Rise to Power: KLGU | Tok Mat | |
| 2021 | Penunggang Agama 2 | Datuk Fawwas | |
| 2022 | Mat Kilau | Imam Bottoqh | |
| 2022 | Tilam Perca | Tok Ketua | |
| 2023 | Imaginur | Zuhal (Senior) | |
| 2023 | Imam | Haji Abdul Rahman | |
| 2024 | Tan-Ti-Ana | Bomoh Agen | |
| 2024 | Abnormal: Buas | | |
| TBA | Munafik 3 | Rahim | Post-production |

=== Television series ===
| Year | Title | Role | TV channel | Notes |
|---|---|---|---|---|
| 1970 | Banjir | | TV1 | |
| 1978 | Dagang Perantau | | TV1 | |
| 1979 | Alang Rentak Seribu | | TV1 | |
| 1979 | Degup Jantung | | TV1 | |
| 2004 | Sephia | | TV3 | |
| 2008 | Saka | Pak Din | TV3 | |
| 2008 | Goda | Dato' Razak | 8TV | |
| 2010 | Villa Tepi Surau | | TV Alhijrah | |
| 2010 | Chinta | Osman Kabilah | TV3 | |
| 2011 | Terowong | Ustaz Muis | TV3 | Episode: "Kain Kapan" |
| 2012 | Osman Baku | Cikgu Osman Baku | TV2 | Director |
| 2012 | Darjat | Daud | TV3 | |
| 2012 | Tanah Kubur (Season 4) | Jamil | Astro Oasis | Episode: "Bomoh Siam" |
| 2012 | Tanah Kubur (Season 4) | Jamil | Astro Oasis | Episode: "Santau" |
| 2013 | Rindu Bertamu Di Abu Dhabi | Haji Ilham | TV3 | |
| 2013 | Surat Dari Langit Biru | Pak Asan | TV3 | |
| 2013 | Nur Khalifah | | TV2 | |
| 2014–2015 | Siri Bercakap Dengan Jin | Long Peah | Astro Mustika HD | |
| 2014–2021 | Gerak Khas | Pak Osman | TV2, TV3 | |
| 2015 | Bangsal Tua | | TV2 | |
| 2015 | Ajaibnya Cinta | Pak Akob | TV3 | |
| 2015–2018 | Mak Cun | Pak Akob | TV3 | |
| 2017 | Menanti Februari | Encik Haris | TV3 | |
| 2018 | Tok Adi | Seman | Astro Oasis | |
| 2018 | Pengantin 100 Hari | Dato' Fahmi | TV3 | |
| 2018 | Mencari Qiblat | Ustaz | TV3 | |
| 2018 | Mata Ketiga | | Tonton | |
| 2018 | Split TV Series | | Astro Citra | |
| 2019 | Imaan | Ustaz Maulana | Astro Oasis | |
| 2019 | Atin, Atan & Mak Cun | Pak Akob | TV3 | |
| 2021 | Kisah Rumah Tangga | Haji Umar | Astro Ria | Episode: "Azan Rumah Abah" |
| 2021 | i-Tanggang | Hakim Mahkamah Tinggi | Astro Citra | |
| 2023 | FYP: Famili Yang Popular | Tok Ki | Astro Ceria | |
| 2024 | Mak Cun, Mai Singgah! | Pak Akob | Tonton | |

=== Telemovie ===
| Year | Title | Role | TV channel |
|---|---|---|---|
| 1991 | Selamat Tahun Baru, YB! | YB | TV3 |
| 2010 | Bagaikan Sumayyah | Tuan Razak | TV3 |
| 2011 | Panggilan Baitullah | | TV3 |
| 2012 | Keroncong Untuk Ana | Pak Hamdi | Astro Prima |
| 2012 | Pujian-Pujian | | Astro Prima |
| 2013 | Diari Hatiku | | TV2 |
| 2013 | Cinta Laila Majnun | | Astro Oasis |
| 2014 | Dari Kerana Mata | | Astro Prima |
| 2014 | Kereta Kita | Omar | TV3 |
| 2014 | Spain Uolls | Pak Akob | TV3 |
| 2015 | Sawadeeka - Mak Cun | Pak Akob | TV3 |
| 2016 | Gajet Mak Dah | Pak Mail | TV9 |
| 2016 | Baju Berkancing Peniti | Usup | TV3 |
| 2016 | Bila Embun Merintih | Ismail Lembung | TV3 |
| 2016 | Mak Cun Pi New York | Pak Akob | TV3 |
| 2017 | Syukur Syawal | Pak Seman | TV3 |
| 2017 | Mak Cun Pi Lombok | Pak Akob | TV3 |
| 2018 | Kitab Sijjin | | Astro Citra |
| 2018 | Penjara Abah | | Astro Citra |
| 2018 | Bebaskan Anak Kita | Rahim | TV3 |
| 2018 | Mak Cun Pi Amerika Lagi | Pak Akob | TV3 |
| 2018 | Telingkah | Imam Daruni | TV2 |
| 2020 | #Sampai Syurga | | Awesome TV |
| 2020 | Kelab Gentleman | Kapten Kamal | TV3 |
| 2020 | Osman Baku | Cikgu Osman Baku | TV1 |
| 2020 | Mak Cun Anjung Orang Kita | Pak Akob | TV3 |
| 2021 | Kari Ayam Mama | Tok Man | TV9 |
| 2022 | Terbuka Pintu Syurga | Pak Mail @ Pakwe | Astro Prima |
| 2022 | Radio Atok | Atok | TV9 |
| 2023 | Mistik Bilik Mayat | Tok Adam | TV Alhijrah |

=== TV commercial ===
| Year | Title |
|---|---|
| 2014 | Perbadanan Insurans Deposit Malaysia |
| 2017 | Cerun Yang Selamat |
| 2022 | Media Prima Hari Kebangsaan 2022: 3 Sekawan |

=== Theater ===
| Year | Title | Role |
|---|---|---|
| 2011 | Lat Kampung Boy Sebuah Muzikal | Pak Samad |

=== Television ===
| Year | Title | Role | TV channel | Notes |
|---|---|---|---|---|
| 2010 | The Untold Truth About Supermokh | Himself | National Geographic Channel | Documentary |
| 2011 | Arena Sukan | Pengacara | Astro Arena | |

== Honours ==
- Perak
  - Knight Commander of the Order of the Perak State Crown (DPMP) – Dato' (1995)
