= My Beloved Dearest =

2013 film

- Film poster
- Malay: Sayang Disayang
- Directed by: Sanif Olek
- Written by: Sanif Olek; Gene Sha Rudyn
- Produced by: Sanif Olek
- Starring: Rahim Razali; Aidli Mosbit
- Cinematography: M Senthilnathan; Vincent Wong
- Music by: Imran Ajmain
- Release date: 2013
- Running time: 80 minutes
- Country: Singapore
- Languages: Malay; Bahasa Indonesia

My Beloved Dearest (Malay: Sayang Disayang) is a 2013 Singaporean drama film directed by Sanif Olek. This film is notable as Singapore's first locally made Malay-language film since the 1970s.

== Plot ==
The film tells the story of the fractious relationship between Murni, a homesick Indonesian caregiver slash domestic helper and her crabby and disabled older Singaporean master, a widower named Pak Harun who sits on his wheelchair all day by the sliding glass door where the curtains are shut and seemingly waiting for someone to rescue him from his loneliness and helplessness. Pak Harun resists all basic conversation with Murni and rudely expresses his dislike of the food that she serves him every day, including the traditional Nusantara dish sambal goreng.

== Cast ==
- Rahim Razali as Harun
- Aidli Mosbit as Murni
- Asnida Daud as Siti
- Hashimah Hamidon as Minah
- Rafaat Hj Hamzah as Rosli
- Norsiah Ramly
- Keatar HM
- Shah Iskandar
- Khalid Baboo

== Reception ==
It was selected as Singapore's official 2015 entry for the Best Foreign Language Film at the 87th Academy Awards, but was not nominated.

In November 2013 the film won the Best Asian Film (Jury Prize) at the SalaMindanaw International Film Festival in the Philippines.

In 2014 it was the closing film for the Southeast Asian Film Festival and opening film for the Phnom Penh International Film Festival. It was an Official Selection at the Jogja-NETPAC Asian Film Festival, the Hawaii International Film Festival where it was showcased in the festival's New Frontiers section, the Edmonton International Film Festival, the Luang Prabang Film Festival, the Barcelona International Film Festival and showcased at the Southeast Asian Screen Academy. It also represented Singapore at the Asia Pacific Screen Awards but was not nominated.

Other awards include the Mexico International Film Festival's Best Musical award, and the Best Feature at the 12th Royal Bali International Film Festival.

== See also ==
- List of submissions to the 87th Academy Awards for Best Foreign Language Film
- List of Singaporean submissions for the Academy Award for Best Foreign Language Film
