= University of Technology Brunei =

National university in Brunei

- Universiti Teknologi Brunei (Malay) اونيۏرسيتي تيكنولوڬي بروني (Jawi)
- Crest of Universiti Teknologi Brunei
- Motto: Berilmu Beriman Berinovasi (Malay)
- Motto in English: Knowledgeable Believable Innovating
- Type: Public research university
- Established: 1 January 1986
- Founder: Sultan Hassanal Bolkiah
- Accreditation: ACCA; CIHT; CITP; EFMD; EngC; ICE; IMechE; IStructE; PWI
- Academic affiliations: ACU; BCS; SWE
- Chairperson: Romaizah Mohd Salleh
- Chancellor: Sultan Hassanal Bolkiah
- Vice-Chancellor: Associate Professor Pengiran Dr. Mohammad Iskandar bin Pengiran Haji Petra
- Pro-Chancellor: Crown Prince Al-Muhtadee Billah
- Location: Jalan Tungku Link, BE1410, Brunei Darussalam; 4.978°N 114.901°E
- Campus: Regional
- Colours: Purple
- Mascot: Awang Jubilee (AJ)
- Website: www.utb.edu.bn

The Universiti Teknologi Brunei (UTB or University of Technology Brunei) is a public research university situated in Bandar Seri Begawan, the capital of Brunei, originally founded as Institut Teknologi Brunei (ITB) in 1986. The university focuses on engineering, business, computing, design, applied sciences, and mathematics. The institutions's research is centred around the university's aim to be "A Global University Impacting Society."

== History ==
The Director of Education proposed to the government in 1980 that the Technical Training Centre be developed and expanded before the university was founded, and the plan was approved in 1982. Before the institute's first student intake started five months later, Leeds Polytechnic helped establish the curriculum, staffing, books, equipment, and training for contract workers in the United Kingdom in 1985. Since the 5th National Development Plan (RKN 5), the ITB building's development plan has been carefully planned and broken down into many stages. Institut Teknologi Brunei (ITB), the university's original name, was founded in January 1986 with the main goal of serving a variety of interests in technical and commercial education. Initially, three departments were created on a site shared by Sultan Saiful Rijal Technical College. 1 hectare (2.5 acres) of the 8 hectares allotted for the campus was covered by the ITB building's Phase I, which was finished in 1997. The foundation for the institute's infrastructure, including necessary spaces for classrooms, academic activities, and administration, was established during this first stage.

In his declaration, Sultan Hassanal Bolkiah gave his approval for the institution to be upgraded to a university during the Teacher's Day celebration on 18 October 2008. On 1 March 2016, the university renamed itself from ITB to Universiti Teknologi Brunei (UTB). 2009 saw the launch of UTB's undergraduate degree programs, which were followed in 2010 by Masters by Research and PhD programs. Additionally, UTB launched taught master's programs in computing, business, and engineering in 2016. Despite the fact that UTB began to offer graduate and undergraduate programs in 2009.

UTB's infrastructure was built in stages, combining ancient and modern structures. In the upcoming years, more infrastructure will be added. The Pearl Building was one of the structures that were completed as a consequence of Phase II. In the meanwhile, the 2013-completed Phase III complex incorporates VRV multi split type air conditioning systems, which are more versatile in terms of occupant management and need less energy than conventional types. On 13 September 2018, the School of Design faculty was formally established as a part of the university's aim to increase the number of undergraduate programs offered. Now under development, the School of Applied Sciences and Mathematics (Phase IV complex) is expected to be completed by Q1 2024.

== Organisation and administration ==
There are a few minimal admission criteria that candidates must fulfil in order to apply to UTB's undergraduate degree programs. In order to be eligible for government scholarships, Bruneians must have earned a Credit Six in Malay at the GCE 'O' Level. Additionally, all candidates must meet the English proficiency requirements with an IELTS score of 6.0, a TOEFL minimum overall score of 550, or an equivalent. They must also have a Credit Six in English Language at the GCE 'O' Level. Candidates must also possess a pertinent qualification that meets the program's particular entrance criteria.

Candidates have to satisfy conditions at UTB in addition to the minimal requirements for admission. They must be free of any security concerns, medically fit, and willing to accept the offer made by the institution, with no room for modification in their program selections. Applications that are incomplete or submitted after the deadline, contain non-certified documents or false information, have previously been turned down by the Ministry of Education (MoE) for any program at Universiti Brunei Darussalam (UBD), Universiti Islam Sultan Sharif Ali (UNISSA), Politeknik Brunei, or UTB, or do not meet the minimum and additional entry requirements will not be considered.

=== Governance ===
The following are the chancellery roles at UTB:

- Chancellor
- Pro–Chancellor
- Vice–Chancellor
- Assistant Vice–Chancellor (External and Industry Relations)
- Assistant Vice–Chancellor (Academic Affairs)
- Assistant Vice–Chancellor (Research and Innovation)
- Assistant Vice–Chancellor (Student, Alumni and Services)

=== Faculties and programmes ===
The UTB School of Business, the Faculty of Engineering, and the School of Computing and Informatics (SCI) all provide undergraduate and graduate academic programs. Twenty undergraduate degrees, five taught master's degrees, master's by research degrees, and doctorate programs are available.

The UTB Faculty of Engineering, established in 1986, offers four-year Bachelor of Engineering programs in Chemical, Civil, Electrical & Electronic, Mechanical, Mechatronics, and Energy Engineering, along with coursework Master's degrees in Civil, Electrical and Electronic, Mechanical Engineering, and Water Resources and Environmental Engineering. The SCI at UTB, originally established in 1986 as the Department of Computing and Information Systems, evolved through various phases within the university, becoming a separate entity in 2014. SCI encompasses three program areas: Creative Computing, Computer and Information Systems, and Computer Network Security.

The accounting, economics, and management departments of UTB School of Business provide three graduate degree programs in addition to an undergraduate curriculum with six majors. The UTB Center for Communication, Teaching and Learning (CCTL), which is divided into the fields of communication, Melayu Islam Beraja, and teaching & learning, is dedicated to improving communication skills through higher-order programs. Agrotechnology, Applied Mathematics and Economics (AME) and Food Science and Technology (FST), 3-year Bachelor of Science (Hons), are all offered at the School of Applied Sciences and Mathematics (SASM).

Three main areas of study are the emphasis of UTB's research efforts: water, green technology, and oil and gas. The UTB Centre for Transport Research (CfTR) was founded to do research in the fields of traffic, highway & geotechnics, and transport safety. Research activities include policy studies, transport modelling, and intelligent transport systems. The mission of the Centre for Innovative Engineering is to establish itself as a vibrant hub for creative, multidisciplinary translational research.

=== Research ===
Three university-level research centers and four Research Thrusts covering topics important to Brunei's business and society comprise UTB's research divisions. The four Research Thrusts offer forums for teachers and academic staff from different institutions to work together. Three research centers actively conduct research in interdisciplinary expert teams and collaborate with other parties, including businesses and governmental organisations, to secure funding and consulting jobs.

Digital and Creativity Research Thrust (DCRT), Energy Research Thrust (ERT), Society and Enterprise Research Thrust (SERT), and Wellness Research Thrust (WRT) are the four Research Thrusts at UTB that are in line with Wawasan Brunei 2035. The Centre for Transport Research (CfTR), the Centre for Green Technology and Sustainable Research (GreenTeXs), and the Centre for Research on Agri-Food Science and Technology (CrAFT) are three more specialised research centres at UTB that concentrate on important national issues.

== Academic profile ==
=== Rankings ===
University rankings

Global – Overall
- QS World: =578 (2026)

Regional – Overall
- QS Asia: =134 (2025)

In 2018, UTB debuted at position 442 in the QS World University Rankings, which ranks universities from 151 countries out of 4,763. In 2019, the university moved up 63 spots to a newer ranking of 379. UTB was also ranked at 51 for Young Global Universities under 50 years of age. UTB was placed 181 out of over 500 universities throughout the continent, placing it in the top 36% according to the 2019 QS Asia University Rankings. UTB moved up 44 spots to be placed 137 in 2020, placing it in the top 150 universities in Asia. As the first university to successfully get the ISO 9001:2015 Quality Management System Certification by Bureau Veritas in July 2019, it is the only university in the country to achieve a five-star rating from QS Stars.

As of 2024, UTB ranked 525th in the QS World University Ranking, and 142nd in Asia by the QS Asia University Rankings. Furthermore, the institution ranks third in the AppliedHE subcategory of Teaching and Learning and in the Top 10 in the AppliedHE Public & Private University Ranking: ASEAN 2024. In the QS World University Rankings: Sustainability 2024, the university remained listed.

=== International partnerships ===
UTB actively engages in international partnerships to enhance academic quality, promote research collaboration, and provide industrial exposure through its ExperiencePLUS programme. These partnerships support student and staff mobility, joint research initiatives, and global academic networking. Through international partnerships, research opportunities, and industrial internships, the ExperiencePLUS program improves students' academic experiences. For the benefit of students and teachers, UTB maintains international relationships with universities and businesses in addition to local partnerships with organisations like Darussalam Enterprise (DARe), E-Government National Centre (EGNC), and Authority for Info-communications Technology Industry (AITI).

In 2024, UTB established the UTB Global Office to further strengthen and coordinate the university’s internationalisation efforts. The office plays a central role in expanding UTB’s global footprint by fostering new institutional partnerships and actively participating in international academic and research consortiums.

As part of its commitment to international standards, UTB has attained several globally recognised accreditations. On 20 June 2023, UTB School of Business received worldwide accreditation from the European Foundation for Management Development (EFMD). These include its Master of Science in Management and Technology degree and its Bachelor of Business (Hons) with all six concentrations. Master of Science in Mechanical Engineering is accredited by Institution of Mechanical Engineers (IMechE) and Engineering Council (EngC). Master of Science in Water Resources and Environmental Engineering is accredited by Joint Board of Moderators (JBM), Institution of Civil Engineers (ICE), Institution of Structural Engineers (IStructE), Chartered Institution of Highways and Transportation (CIHT), Permanent Way Institution (PWI) and EngC. Master of Science in Computing and Information Systems is accredited by Chartered IT Professional (CITP). UTB School of Business is accredited by Association of Chartered Certified Accountants (ACCA).

== Student life ==
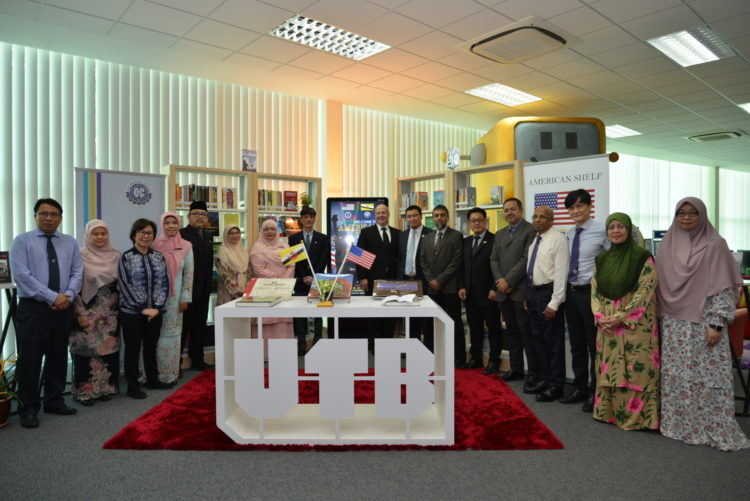
UTB Library

About 1,439 students and 241 employees, including 134 academic staff members, call UTB home as of 2017. More than 5,000 HNDs and 500 degree graduates have come from UTB.

=== International students ===
Through the Students Welfare Office, UTB provides a range of support services to its foreign students, including help with applications for student passes and visas. Further resources and networking possibilities are offered via the International Students' Club and EXCO International Affairs. There are scheduled tours to explore Brunei's culture during semester holidays, and regular discourse sessions are held to address any problems. Additionally, students can take advantage of the UTB ExperiencePLUS industrial attachment program.

=== Residential colleges ===
The Core Residential College (commonly known as The Core) is the most popular off-campus housing option for international students, located just a five to seven-minute walk from campus. It offers both regular and premium apartment settings, with a total of 440 separate bedrooms. Each five-bedroom apartment includes shared living areas, a kitchen, bathroom, and laundry facilities. Additionally, a shuttle bus service is available for students to shop for groceries at Rimba Point.

=== Chancellor's Trophy ===
Since its founding in 2021, the Chancellor's Trophy aims to encourage the expansion of sports, rivalries, and friendships among Brunei's public and private higher education institutions. The Chancellor's Trophy also highlights the leaders of the separate student councils and the university working together. The winner of the Chancellor's Trophy 2022 was UBD, with UNISSA coming in second and UTB in third.

== Notable people ==
=== Vice-Chancellors ===
- 1986–1993: Dato Mustafa Abu Bakar
- 1993–1995: Mirhassan Abu Bakar
- 1995–1998: Abu Hanifah Mohd Salleh
- 1998–2004: Dato Mohd Yusra Abdul Halim
- 2004–2005: Suhaila Abdul Karim (Acting)
- 2005–2008: Kassim Daud
- 2008: Naemah Basir (Acting)
- 2009–2012: Omar Khalid
- 2012–2026: Datin Zohrah Sulaiman
- 2026–present: Pengiran Dr. Mohammad Iskandar Pengiran Haji Petra

=== Notable staff ===
- Andrew R. Barron, visiting professor of environmental engineering at ITB

=== Notable alumni ===
- Naasiruddeen Abdul Wahab, national football player
- Nur Wasiqah Aziemah, national pencak silat athlete
- Zul F, singer-songwriter and actor
- Basma Lachkar, national wushu athlete
