= Zul F =

- Born: Zul Fakhari bin Muksin; 24 October 1980 (age 45); Brunei
- Education: Universiti Brunei Darussalam (BA); Universiti Teknologi Brunei (PhD)
- Occupations: Singer-songwriter; actor; educator
- Musical career
- Genres: Latin; Soul; Jazz
- Instrument: Vocals
- Years active: 2006–present
- Label: Origin Artistic Management
- Website: http://www.originartistic.com/

Zul Fakhari bin Muksin (born 24 October 1980) or stage name Zul F, is a Bruneian male singer-songwriter and actor. He gained recognition after winning P2F, Brunei's version of the Idol series, and was the first Bruneian artist to appear on MTV Asia in 2007, with his video Dari Mata.

== Education ==
In 2005, Zul received his Bachelor of Arts (Education) in TESL from Universiti Brunei Darussalam. He started his professional career in 2005 at Rimba Secondary School as an Education Officer. In 2012, he began teaching communication skills as Assistant Head of the General Studies Division (Academic) at Brunei Polytechnic. In August 2024, he graduated with a Doctor of Philosophy from Universiti Technology Brunei.

== Career highlights ==
Zul began his music career as a member of Bruneian band Pneumatic Soulz. The group's debut performance was as the opening act for Malaysian artists Elite and X-Factor.

After going solo, he became a contestant and eventual winner of the first season of P2F in 2005. This made him a prominent figure in the local music scene as, prior to P2F, most Bruneians only listened to Malaysian artists.

Zul's first music video, "Dari Mata" screened on MTV Asia in 2007. He was the first local Malay Bruneian to release a music video regionally and internationally.

Following his win on P2F, he became a brand ambassador for Toyota Vios in 2008.

He released his 1st singles album, "Bersama Bintang" in 2006. One of the songs from the album, "Engkau Adalah Cinta" was recorded in Kuala Lumpur, Malaysia. The same song actually made its debut as he was invited to perform at Selayang Stadium, Kuala Lumpur, Malaysia in December 2005.

Zul was featured as Guest Performer in the MoU project (a joint collaboration between RTB, Brunei & Suria, Singapore artist), "Rhapsodi Hitz". The event took place in Singapore.

Four years later, he then released his debut album "Memori Cinta Zul Faden" (Love Memories) in 2011. A few months prior to the release of his debut album, Zul was invited to perform at the ASEAN Tourism Fair in Osaka, Japan, in which he was given the opportunity to perform new songs from his upcoming album.

Within the same year in 2011, he was appointed Goodwill Ambassador and Image Model for Jerudong Park Playground, Brunei's Theme Park, alongside Bruneian artist Maria.

In 2013, he was featured in Brunei's 1st local movie "Ada Apa Dengan Rina" as he co-starred with other established Bruneian actors and actresses. The movie spawned a "Special Jury Award" during the Asean International Film Festival & Awards (AIFFA) 2013 held in Sarawak, Malaysia.

Since then he has been given lead roles in several local telemovies such as "Ketika Mata Bertasbih", "Biru Pesisir Hati" and "Doa dan Sejadah". He also co-starred in the popular 13-episode local TV drama entitled "Rintihanku".

== Discography ==
=== Singles ===
1. Ku Bangun 2. Bersama Bintang 3. Engkau Adalah Cinta 4. Dari Mata 5. Chantik 6. Erti Cinta 7. Cintamu Cintaku Satu (duet with Putri Norizah) 8. Will I Ever 9. This Feeling 10. I Don't Want Love Songs 11. Manaku Pergi 12. Speechless 13. Jangan Sesali 14. Kasih (duet with Maria) 15. Sepi 16. Cobalah Tuk Setia 17. You're The One (with Jazz Hassan) 18. Come Back 19. Just Wanna Dance (feat. Kuj)

=== Albums ===
- Memori Cinta Zul Faden (Love Memories) – 2011

== Awards and honours ==
=== Awards ===
- Best Male Vocalist at the 2006–2007 Pelangi Awards
- Nominated for the Best Male Vocalist at the 2009 Pelangi Award
- Best Male Vocalist at the 2010–2011 Pelangi Award
- Voted 'Popular Male Artist' at the RTB 2008 Awards

=== Honours ===
- Excellent Service Medal (PIKB; 2024)

== Philanthropy ==
In 2005, Zul was involved with the Asia Aid Charity Concert for tsunami victims. In 2009, he performed at the Sounds of Hope Charity Gala Night on October 3 to raise awareness about poverty in Brunei.

In 2011, he performed at the "Enlightening Japan / Brunei Night" charity concert to raise funds for tsunami victims; live broadcast on Nippon TV, Japan.
