= Jarum Halus =

- Directed by: Mark Tan
- Written by: James Thoo
- Produced by: Eleanor Low; Mark Tan
- Starring: Christien New; Juliana Ibrahim; Razif Hashim; Rahim Razali; Farah Putri; Justin Chan; Megat Sharizal; Stephanie Chai
- Music by: San Weng Onn; Rabbit
- Distributed by: Sparky Pictures
- Release date: 10 January 2008
- Running time: 133 minutes
- Country: Malaysia
- Languages: Malay; English
- Budget: USD 40,000

Jarum Halus is a 2008 Malaysian drama film. It is a modern-day adaptation of William Shakespeare's Othello. The film's title (Malay: "Fine Needle") is derived from a Malay idiom meaning web of deceit or conspiracy, which is a major theme in the plot of the film.

The plot remains faithful to the source material, with the cast all taking their Shakespearian counterparts either in name, character or both.

== Production ==
It is the directorial debut of Mark Tan, who originally envisioned the project as a short film for his final project when studying film at Warwick University in the United Kingdom. When returning to his native Malaysia, the short film was used as a means to attract funding for a feature-length project. When a deal was agreed and a script finalised, the quality attracted Malaysian veteran actor Dato Rahim Razali, who agreed to a role on a significantly reduced salary.

== Reception ==
The film received a limited release in January 2008 was released to favourable reviews, with several references to its visual boldness and dynamic mixture of eastern values with western storytelling. It combines both the English and Malay languages in a style typical of urban Malaysian speech.

Jarum Halus won the "Best Digital Film" category in the 20th Malaysia Film Festival on the same year.

== Cast ==
- Christien New as Daniel Oh (based on Othello)
- Juliana Ibrahim as Mona (based on Desdemona)
- Razif Hashim as Iskandar (based on Iago)
- Rahim Razali as Datuk Kalel (based on Lodovico)
- Justin Chan as Michael (based on Cassio)
- Farah Putri as Emilia (based on Emilia)
- Megat Sharizal as Rahim (based on Roderigo)
- Stephanie Chai as Bianca (based on Bianca)

The film features cameo appearances by Douglas Lim, Colin Kirton and Yasmin Yusoff.
