= Janet Khoo =

Malaysian actress

- Born: Janet Khoo Kheng Hoon; 6 March 1973 (age 52); Air Itam, Penang, Malaysia
- Occupation(s): model, actress
- Years active: 1998–present

Janet Khoo Kheng Hoon (born 6 March 1973), known as Janet Khoo (Chinese: Janet 邱), is a TV drama and film actress. She was born in Air Itam, Penang, and is of Malaysian Chinese and Peranakan descent. For the filem Paloh, she was nominated as Best Actress at the 17th Malaysian Film Festival.

Khoo first came to public attention in 1998 with her performance as a Vixen in the soap Idaman. Since then, she has been one of the few Chinese actresses who have made a name in the Malay entertainment scene, appearing in severaltelemovies as well as feature films such as Putera, Kad Cinta and Lurah Dendam.

== Filmography ==
=== Films ===
Year	Title	Role	Notes
1995	Putera	—	
1995	Kad Cinta	—	
1996	Lurah Dendam	—	
2003	Paloh	Siew Lan	

=== Television ===
Year	Title	Role	TV channel	Notes
1996	Idaman	—	Astro Ria	
	Sebening Syawal	—	TV3	Telemovie
	Astana Idaman 1 & 2	—	Astro Ria	
	Permintaan Terakhir Mama	—	—	Telemovie
	Haryati	—	—	As producer
2016–2017	Lara Aishah	Sharon	Astro Maya HD	
