= Filem Negara Malaysia =

Malaysian film production house and government department

National Film Department of Malaysia
- Filem Negara Malaysia (FNM); Jabatan Filem Negara (JFN)
- Filem Negara Malaysia logo, (Note: Besides adopted tiger as its main logo, Filem Negara Malaysia also adopted its official abbreviation, FNM as its secondary logo, wherein it has seen on most of its documentary films.) used from 1986 until 1994.

Department overview
- Formed: 1 April 1946
- Preceding Department: Malayan Film Unit (MFU) (1946–1963)
- Dissolved: 15 May 2013
- Superseding Department: merged with National Film Development Corporation Malaysia (FINAS)
- Headquarters: Jalan Utara, Petaling Jaya, Selangor, Malaysia
- Parent department: Ministry of Information, Communication and Culture
- Website: www.filemnegara.gov.my

The National Film Department of Malaysia (Malay: Filem Negara Malaysia), abbreviated FNM, sometimes Jabatan Filem Negara (JFN) or informally the Malaysian Film Unit; was a Malaysian film production house and the government department under the Malaysian Ministry of Communications and Multimedia. It is responsible for the filming and documentation of national events as well as producing factual and unscripted narrative contents. The film department, which headquartered at Petaling Jaya, Selangor, uses a jumping Malayan tiger as its logo.

Among the main functions of FNM was to spread the information about the policy, programme and achievement of the government and to promote the country through the films produced. Other than that, FNM was tasked to produce and supply high quality documentary films, public service announcement (PSA) and trailers to its clients. FNM was to be the official government film producing organisation with the high international level. Being the first film studio to be established in British Malaya (now Malaysia), Filem Negara Malaysia produces around 100 hours of television programming, making it, for much of its history, the largest documentary production house in the country. It earning them numerous local and international awards.

Since 2013, its archives are with the National Film Development Corporation Malaysia (FINAS) following its merger with the latter to form a standalone film regulatory body. Until its merger with FINAS, Filem Negara Malaysia employs over 10,000 staffs in total, of whom approximately 5,000 worked in creative industry.

== History ==
The National Film Department (NFD) was established on 1 April 1946 as the Malayan Film Unit (MFU). It was founded by Mubin Sheppard who was then working in the Department of Public Relations after the World War II ends and uses his own earnings to buy a film equipment from the British military film team which was to be auctioned in Singapore. It began operations upon its establishment and was originally based in an old factory shed in Jalan Bangsar, Kuala Lumpur. It was a unit under the National Communications Department (Jabatan Perhubungan Raya), thereafter known as the Department of Information.

In 1949, it produced The New Malayan Gazette, a weekly newsreel highlights on important events in Malaya.

In 1958, the Malayan Film Unit planned to produce more documentary films throughout that year with the aim to "introduced Malaya to the world" while intended to focused on films that "reflects the kampung people's way of life" and the Malayan culture.

The Malayan Film Unit was renamed as Filem Negara Malaysia on 22 November 1963, two months after the establishment of Malaysia. The first documentary that the department produced under its present name was Kelahiran Malaysia (Birth of Malaysia).

The present National Film Department complex is situated at Jalan Utara, Petaling Jaya. It was officiated by the third Yang di-Pertuan Agong, Al-Marhum Tuanku Syed Putra Ibni Al-Marhum Syed Hassan Jamalullail on 24 August 1965. In his inaugural speech during the official opening ceremony of the NFD's new complex, Allahyarham Datuk Senu Abdul Rahman, the then Information and Broadcasting Minister, had announced that the ministry decided to incorporate NFD to be one of its departments.

By 1967, the department publish a newsreel, Malaysia: A Week in which every week since the beginning of the year, they published newsreels within a week of the events taking place. Also in the same year, Filem Negara announced that it would sold 51 percent of its stake to the Malaysian public in order to be the Malaysia's premiere film corporation.

The department produced a Brunei's first-ever feature film, Gema Dari Menara (Echoes From the Minaret) for the Brunei Religious Affairs Department, directed by Mohasbi Ahmad. The film was released on 23 October 1968.

Filem Negara Malaysia announced in November 1968 that all documentary and feature films will be produced in color instead of black and white by 1969. The plan for colour films have been discussed in 1963.

On 1 January 1974, the NFD integrated with Radio Televisyen Malaysia to provide "more effective service to the people".

Filem Negara Malaysia remained Malaysia's primary film agency until 1980, when the National Film Development Corporation Malaysia (FINAS) was established in a move intended by the Federal Government to decentralised and streamlined Malaysian film industry more effective and competitive. The department remains with its role to oversees technical matters of film industry while the newly established FINAS focused on regulating economic and commercial matters related to film industry.

The department in 1983 planned to make full use of its facilities, in which its then-Director-General, Abdul Aziz Wok said that "it should be used to its fullest". In 1984, Filem Negara Malaysia partnered with RTM and the Information Department to produce "short and easy-to-understand" documentaries on Government policies. Also, at the same year, the NFD generated about RM60,000 from films processed at its own laboratory, the P. Ramlee Colour Lab and following the directive issued by the Ministry of Information, it planned to processed more films locally. Its then-Director-General, Mokhtar Daud ruled that it was "not meant to curb film producers and advertisers from processing their films abroad".

The department in March 1986 began to produce more 14 documentary films on development, where each was produced for every states in Malaysia as well as the Federal Territory. It also allocated RM6 million for its activities for 1986. The NFD began to set up a video unit to enhanced its capacities to produce more documentaries and feature films.

In 1994, it collaborated with the Sepaktakraw Association of Malaysia (PSM) to produce and release a documentary film revolves on the history of sepak takraw.

On 1 April 1996, Filem Negara Malaysia celebrates its 50th anniversary, concurrently with RTM. At the same time, it produced more documentaries throughout 1996, including World's Wonder Mulu and Ilmu Bekalan Menuju Kecemerlangan.

The Government announced in June 1998 that the film department and FINAS will be privatised and to be placed under two different production companies, namely Keris Motion and HVD Entertainment. The privatisation of the two film bodies receives outrage from the film industry players, with many of them see the privatisation "as something wrong". The Ministry of Information says that the proposed privatisation of Filem Negara Malaysia and FINAS eventually abandoned in May 1999, citing "several factors that make it unsuitable for implemented".

In March 2002, Filem Negara Malaysia announced a big shift in its leadership. Its Director-General, Syed Hamzah Syed Othman would be retiring from his post and would be replaced by Raja Rozaimie Raja Dalnish Shah effective April 1, which was the film department's 56th anniversary. Raja Rozaimie previously holds many capacities in the NFD since 1993 before become its DG for 11 years, making him the longest-serving DG in the film department's history.

Between 2002 and 2003, the NFD collaborated with FINAS to co-produced two feature films Embun and Paloh.

FNM partnered with RTM to co-organised the inaugural Short Film Awards which took place on 27 January 2007.

In November 2012, former Information, Communication and Culture Minister, Rais Yatim announced that FNM and National Film Development Corporation Malaysia (FINAS) will be merged to form a standalone film regulator. The merger was completed on May 15, 2013, with Filem Negara Malaysia itself renamed as FINAS completely after the combined of both entities. As a result of this merger, about 40% of Filem Negara Malaysia's staffs moved to FINAS and offered suitable roles within the latter based on their skills and experience, while the remaining 80% of its staffs have been let go. The remaining staffs of Filem Negara Malaysia have since moved to different media companies to continue their survival in the media industry. The decision to merge the two film bodies was first proposed in 1991, but there have been further delays due to legal issues.

== Governance ==
Filem Negara Malaysia is a government department under the Ministry of Information and responsible for documentation of national events and production of Malaysian narrative and documentary screen content. Its purpose is to help Malaysians from all races to understand the problems and ways of living other Malaysians. The department also functioned to combatting illiteracy, promoting and spreading public education and information to the Malaysian communities.

Even with its status as a government-owned film department and despite being funded by the Government of Malaysia, the NFD also operated on semi-commercial lines where it rents its equipment, does processing and printing work for non-official organisations and undertakes production works for outside sponsors.

=== Branch office ===
NFD has a branch office situated at Kompleks RTM, Jalan P. Ramlee, Kuching, Sarawak. Sarawak's NFD branch, which was established in the mid-1960s, used to be the Sarawak Information Department Film Unit with the role of broadcasting and screening films produced by the NFD.

Sarawak's NFD branch has broadened its functions in covering the national events and producing films on Sarawak, Sabah and the Federal Territory of Labuan.

== Visual identity ==
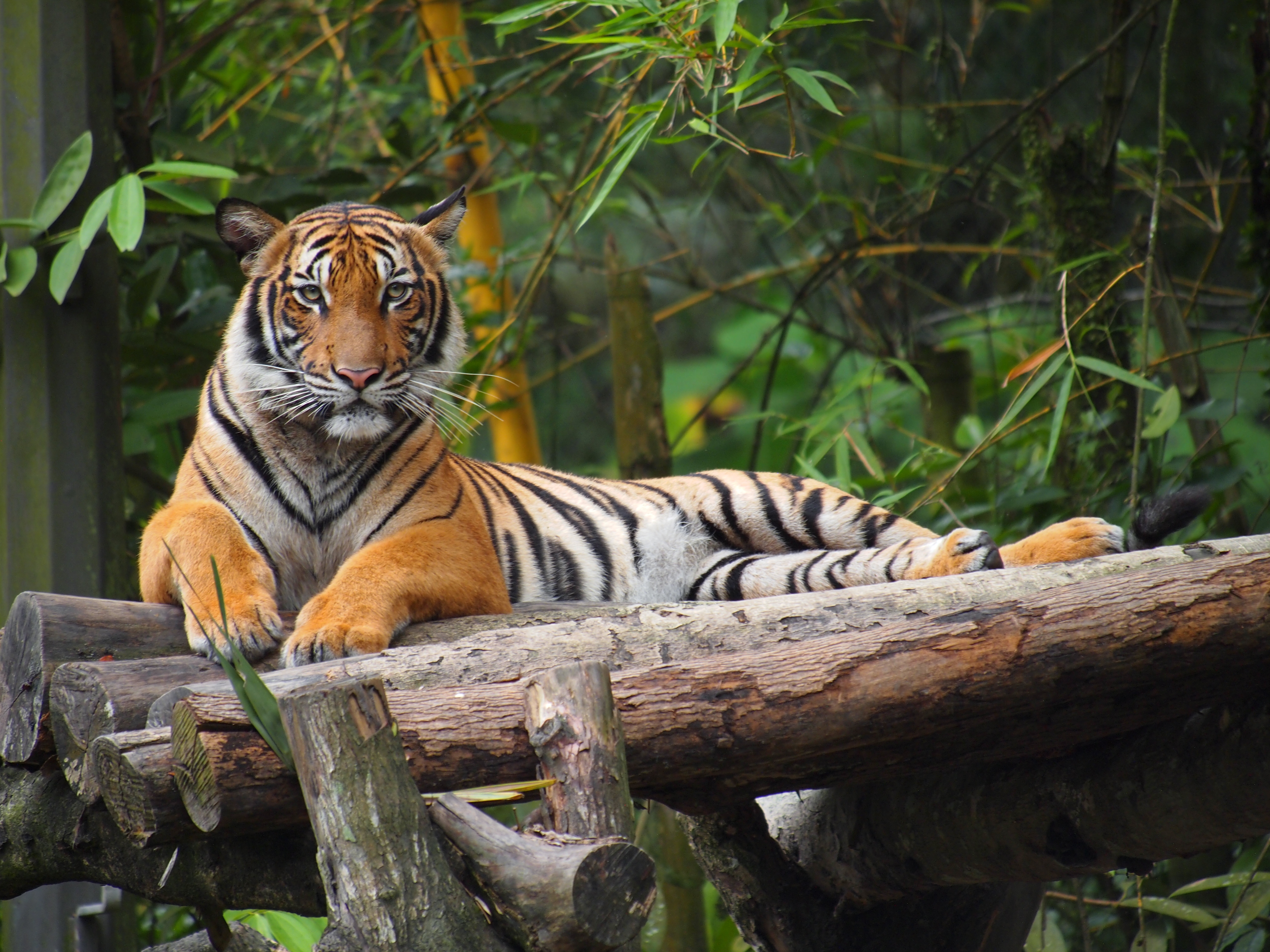
The Malayan tiger has become the symbol of Filem Negara Malaysia.

The NFD's corporate logo was created by Gillie Potter, who was then the Art Director at the agency's Motion Pictures Division. He had incorporated the picture of a Malayan tiger in the logo to symbolise activeness, patience and strength. These traits were crucial for the NFD at that time as it was facing many obstacles to prove its capability. Following the name change from Malayan Film Unit to Filem Negara Malaysia in November 1963, a new version of the tiger emblem was adopted.

== Act and functions ==
Filem Negara Malaysia's functions are clearly defined by an Act of Parliament which is the Functions of Ministries Act, 1969 P.U (A) 126 - Film Division and Production.

Among the functions of the department include:

- Production of documentary films and trailers
- Coverage of national events (archive)
- Storage and restoration of audio visual aids
- Selling of films and audio visual storage
- Distribution of the department's produced films
- Providing filming services
- The rental of the department's produced films

== List of productions ==
Following is a list of selected productions from Filem Negara Malaysia's archive and catalogue. Films were not produced by Filem Negara Malaysia are not listed. Titles in Malay were provided with literal or close English translation.

=== Films ===
- 1957: Abu Nawas
- 1968: Gema Dari Menara (Echoes From the Minaret) - Brunei's first-ever feature film (Note: Produced for the Brunei Religious Affairs Department.)
- 1975: Anak Seluang Jauh Melaut (A Youngster Going Far Away)
- 1976: Madu Beracun (The Poisonous Honey)
- 1978: Dayang Suhana
- 1983: Bila Hati Telah Retak (When the Heart was Broken)
- 1983: Ke Medan Jaya (To the Field of Victory)
- 1989: Cempaka Biru (Blue Magnolia)
- 1994: Untukmu (For You)
- 2002: Embun (Dewdrop) (Note: Co-produced with the National Film Development Corporation Malaysia (FINAS).)
- 2003: Paloh

=== Animations ===
==== Hikayat Sang Kancil series ====
- 1983: Hikayat Sang Kancil (Tales of a Mousedeer)
- 1984: Sang Kancil dan Sang Monyet (A Mousedeer and a Monkey)
- 1987: Sang Kancil dan Sang Buaya (A Mousedeer and a Crocodile)

==== Kisah dan Teladan series ====
- 1986: Arnab yang Sombong (The Arrogant Rabbit)
- 1986: Singa yang Haloba (The Greedy Lion)
- 1986: Gagak yang Bijak (The Smart Crow)
- 1995: Telur Sebiji Riuh Sekampung (One Egg Makes a Whole Village)
- 1997: Budi Baik Dibalas Baik (Kindness Begets Kindness)
- 1998: Jambo Manja (The Pampered Baby Elephant)
- 2001: Bangau Oh Bangau (Stork O Stork)

=== Documentary films ===
All of Filem Negara Malaysia's documentary films were narrated by uncredited narrators. There are some of its documentaries were narrated by both male and female narrators.

==== As Malayan Film Unit ====
- 1949: Semangat Kinta (Kinta Story)
- 1951: Wanted for Murder
- 1952: Brunei: The Abode of Peace
- 1952: Acting on Information
- 1952: Badminton, Thomas Cup Matches
- 1953: Before the Wind
- 1953: A Better Man
- 1953: Buffaloes for Ploughing
- 1953: Building Bonnie Babies
- 1954: Padi Kuncha (Hassan's Homecoming)
- 1954: Rohani Maju Mulia (Rohani Steps Out)
- 1955: Youth in Action
- 1955: Malacca: Then and Now
- 1955: Golden Queen (Note: Credits shown on ending sequence.)
- 1956: Timeless Temiar (Note: Credits shown on opening sequence.)
- 1956: Wayang Kulit
- 1957: Big Kitchen
- 1957: Misi Merdeka (Merdeka Mission)
- 1957: Menuju Kemerdekaan (Towards the Independence)
- 1957: Kemerdekaan Malaya (Merdeka for Malaya)
- 1957: Our History in Stamps
- 1958: Ali Finds a Secret
- 1958: Brunei
- 1958: Brunei Merayakan (Brunei Celebrates)
- 1959: Brunei Welcomes Their Majesties
- 1959: The Big Vote
- 1959: Anika Warna (Assorted Colours)
- 1959: Funeral of Sultan Sir Ibrahim
- 1960: Batu Caves
- 1960: Sama Usaha Sama Merasa (Same Effort, Same Feeling)
- 1961: The Year 1961
- 1961: Malaya
- 1961: Aboard for Congo
- 1961: Bulan Bahasa (The Language Month)
- 1961: Bahasa Menyatukan Bangsa (Language Unites Nation)
- 1961: Sa-Kali Chuchok Terus Semboh (Yaws in Malaya)
- 1961: Pertabalan Pengiran Musa Mahkota Brunei (Crowning of Prince Musa of Brunei)
- 1962: Safar
- 1962: Lembaran Baru (Life a New)
- 1962: Borneo Welcomes Tunku
- 1962: Persetujuan Malaysia (Agreement of Malaysia)
- 1962: Ashkar Melayu Brunei (Bruneian Malay Soldiers)
- 1962: Cities of Malaya
- 1963: Kembali Ka-Brunei (Return to Brunei)
- 1963: Milestones To Malaysia

==== As Filem Negara Malaysia ====
- 1963: Kelahiran Malaysia (Birth of Malaysia)
- 1963: Bulan Bahasa Kebangsaan (National Language Month)
- 1963: Bahasa Bangaan Bangsa (Language of National Pride)
- 1964: Kebangkitan Malaysia (The Rise of Malaysia)
- 1964: Mata Permata (The Gemstones)
- 1964: Bintara
- 1964: Bahasa Peribadi Bangsa (Language is the Nation's Personality)
- 1964: Bapa Malaysia (Founding Fathers of Malaysia)
- 1964: Blatant Aggression
- 1964: The Malaysian Parliament
- 1965: Seruan Suchi (Note: Produced in association with the Government of Saudi Arabia.) (The Sacred Calling)
- 1965: Penyaer Akordian (Note: Produced for the United States Information Service.) (Poet of the Accordion)
- 1965: Commonwealth in Malaysia
- 1966: To Regret is Already Too Late
- 1966: Berkhidmat Memimpin Umat (Note: Produced for the Ministry of Defence.) (They Serve to Lead)
- 1966: Saka Pengharapan (Corridors of Faith)
- 1966: Tun Mustapha
- 1966: Bersatu Berjaya (United to Success)
- 1967: Atap Genting Atap Rumbia (The Thatched Roof)
- 1967: Antara Dua Jiwa (Between Two Souls)
- 1969: Sopan Santun Makan Bersuap (The Etiquette Eating Habit)
- 1969: 1st Asian Highway Motor Rally
- 1969: The Red Book
- 1970: Pearl of the Orient
- 1970: Anika Seni Asia Tenggara (Anika Southeast Asian Art)
- 1971: Mara Bersama Rukun Negara (Advanced Together with Rukun Negara)
- 1971: Benchana Banjir (The Big Flood)
- 1971: Ranchangan Membasmi Malaria (The Malaria Eradication Programme)
- 1972: Perjuangan Kami Menentang Penyamun Komunis (Our Struggle to Fight the Communists)
- 1972: Sinar Bahagia (Note: Produced for the Department of Orang Asli Affairs (JHEOA).) (Light of Happiness)
- 1972: Tarian Kebudayaan Malaysia (Malaysia's Cultural Dances)
- 1972: Majallah Sarawak No. 21 (Sarawak Magazine No. 21)
- 1973: Gasing (Top Spinning)
- 1974: Kuala Lumpur Wilayah Persekutuan (Kuala Lumpur the Federal Territory)
- 1974: Ke Arah Perpaduan (Towards National Unity)
- 1974: Lawatan Tun Razak Ke Peking Dan Shanghai (Tun Razak's Visit to Beijing and Shanghai)
- 1975: Angkasapuri
- 1976: Perginya Negarawan Ulung (Death of a Prominent Statesman)
- 1977: Keindahan Negeri Sarawak (Fascinating Sarawak)
- 1978: Bersatu Bertambah Mutu (Unity Improves Quality)
- 1978: Sayur-Sayuran Pendapatan Lumayan (Note: Produced for the Agriculture Department.) (Vegetables Brings Profit)
- 1978: Budaya Abadi (Eternal Culture)
- 1978: Ke Arah Kecukupan Beras (Towards Rice Sufficiency)
- 1980: Berselang-Seli (Side by Side)
- 1980: Detik Gemilang Dalam Sejarah (Note: Narrated by both male and female narrators.) (The Glorious Moments in History)
- 1980: Rukun Islam Kelima: Ibadah Haji (The Fifth Tenets of Islam: The Hajj)
- 1980: Seni Warisan Silam (Heritage Arts of the Past)
- 1980: Penyakit Demam Denggi (Note: Produced for the Health Education Division, the Ministry of Health Malaysia.) (The Dengue Fever)
- 1981: Istiadat Pembukaan Penggal Ke-3, Majlis Parlimen Yang Ke-5 (Opening Ceremony of the 3rd, Term of the 5th Parliament)
- 1982: Negeri Sembilan Dalam Era Pembangunan (Negri Sembilan in the Development Era)
- 1983: Labu Sayong
- 1984: Dikir Barat
- 1984: Ramadan Berlalu, Syawal Menjelang (Ramadhan Has Passed, Here Comes Shawwal)
- 1984: PUSPATI
- 1985: Gua Niah (Niah Cave)
- 1985: Masjid-Masjid di Malaysia (Mosques in Malaysia)
- 1985: Kebajikan Tanggungjawab Bersama (Note: Produced for the Social Welfare Department.) (Welfare is Our Shared Responsibilities)
- 1985: Pemindahan Raksasa (Note: Produced for the Department of Wildlife and National Parks (PERHILITAN).) (Note: Produced for the National Electricity Board (NEB).) (The Giant Relocation)
- 1985: Taman Negara Bako (Bako National Park)
- 1985: Jambatan Pulau Pinang (Penang Bridge) (Note: Produced for the Malaysian Highway Authority.)
- 1985: Ronda
- 1986: Trez Amigos
- 1986: Istiadat Perkahwinan Di-Raja Pahang dan Johor (Royal Wedding Ceremony of Pahang and Johore)
- 1986: Awasi Jerat Dadah (Beware of Dadah)
- 1986: Gawai Antu (A Festival of the Spirits)
- 1987: Dari Desa Ke Kampus (Note: Produced for the University of Malaya (UM).) (From the Countryside to the Campus)
- 1987: Malaysia Memerangi Najis Dadah (Malaysia Fights the Dadah)
- 1988: Keajaiban Tabii (Natural Wonder)
- 1989: Fruits of Excellence
- 1990: Jambori Pengakap Antarabangsa Selangor Darul Ehsan 1990 (Note: Produced in association with the Selangor Scouts Council and Selangor State Government.) (1990 Selangor International Scouts Jamboree)
- 1990: Pertemuan di Ambang Adat Lama (Meeting on the Threshold of the Old Customs)
- 1990: Warna Mu Berseri (Beauty and Grace)
- 1990: Dalam Kenangan Tunku Abdul Rahman (In Memory of Tunku Abdul Rahman)
- 1990: SUKMA Ke-3 Sarawak (Third SUKMA in Sarawak)
- 1990: Mandela Pejuang Kebebasan (Mandela the Freedom Champion)
- 1991: Secrets of the Natural Wonder
- 1991: Teeth for Life (Note: Produced for the Dental Services Division, the Ministry of Health Malaysia.)
- 1992: Kejohanan Piala Thomas (Thomas Cup Championship)
- 1992: Malaysia di Bawah Garis Khatulistiwa (Malaysia Just Above the Equator)
- 1992: Bangunan Sultan Abdul Samad (Sultan Abdul Samad Building)
- 1993: Pua Kumbu (Threads of Tradition)
- 1993: Ekspedisi Rejang (The Rejang Expedition)
- 1994: Kehidupan Beragama di Malaysia (Malaysia: A Multi-Religious Society)
- 1994: Misi Keamanan (Peacekeeping Mission)
- 1994: Tepian Sungai Asas Kemajuan Bandar (Riverine Development)
- 1995: Gunung Tahan (Mount Tahan)
- 1995: Selembut Sutera (Silk Serenade)
- 1995: Tropikana Malaysia (Malaysia's Tropicana)
- 1995: Bersepakat dan Berdikari (United and Self-Reliant)
- 1995: Hutan Pelindung Alam (Tropical Evergreen)
- 1996: World's Wonder Mulu
- 1996: Tersimpul Ikatan Tradisi (Matters of the Heart)
- 1996: Tebingan Kuching (Kuching Waterfront)
- 1996: Ilmu Bekalan Menuju Kecemerlangan (Knowledge Towards Excellence)
- 1997: Malaysia Indah (The Beautiful Malaysia)
- 1997: Ubur-ubur (Note: Produced for the Fisheries Research Institute of Sarawak.) (The Jellyfish)
- 1997: Orang Asli
- 1998: Taman Negara: Destinasi Alam Semulajadi (Taman Negara: Nature's Paradise)
- 1998: Bayu Gemilang (The Glorious Wind)
- 1999: Satu Abad Industri Perikanan (Centenary of Fisheries Industry)
- 1999: Cintailah Sungai Kita (Note: Produced for the Department of Irrigation and Drainage.) (River for Life)
- 1999: Meniti Gerbang Kedewasaan (On the Threshold Towards Adulthood)
- 1999: Terubok Sarawak (Tenualosa)
- 2000: Citizens of Tomorrow
- 2000: Industri Berat Negara (The Nation's Heavy Industry)
- 2001: Parang Ilang: The Traditional Weapon of Sarawak
- 2002: KLIA
- 2003: Profil Sultan Selangor (Profile of the Sultan of Selangor) (Note: Produced for the Sultan Abdul Aziz Royal Gallery.)
- 2004: Sistem Raja Berperlembagaan (The Constitutional Monarchy System)
- 2007: Tunku: Bapa Kita (Tunku: Our Founding Father)
- 2010: Memoir Tun Abdullah Ahmad Badawi (Memoirs of Tun Abdullah Ahmad Badawi)

=== Documentary series ===
- Kesah Kampong Kita (Our Kampong Story)
- Majalah Sarawak (Sarawak Magazine)
- Malaysia Kita (Profile of Malaysia)
- Sejarah Lisan Pengkisah (Oral History of Storytellers)

=== Public service announcements ===
- 1963: Keselamatan Jalan Raya Bermula Dengan Tuan
- 1977: Selamat Hari Krismas
- 1979: Bunuhlah Nyamuk Aedes, Gunakan Ubat Jentik-Jentik
- 1981: Amalkan Semangat Kejiranan
- 1982: Tiada Aedes, Tiada Denggi
- 1987: Dadah Itu Racun
- 1987: Jagalah Kebersihan Tandas
- 1987: Sebelum Terlambat, Berikan Sedikit Masa Kepada Anak Anda
- 1991: Cintailah Sungai Kita
- 1992: AIDS Pembunuh: Hentikan Tragedi Ini
- 1992: AIDS: Elakkan Keraguan, Ketahuilah Fakta Sebenar
- 1993: Kebersihan Tandas, Tanggungjawab Bersama
- 1997: Menabung Menjamin Kesejahteraan
- 1998: Utamakan Kebersihan

== See also ==
- National Film Development Corporation Malaysia (FINAS)
