= Embun (2002 film) =

2002 Malaysian historical period drama film

- Theatrical release poster
- Directed by: Erma Fatima
- Written by: Rohiman Haroon; Erma Fatima
- Screenplay by: Aziz M. Osman (Note: Credited as script panel.); Erma Fatima; Fatimah Abu Bakar; Sujian Salleh
- Starring: Umie Aida; Aqasha; Izi Yahya; Hani Mohsin; Rahim Razali; Ahmad Tarmimi Siregar; Khatijah Tan
- Cinematography: Gay Hian Teoh
- Edited by: Kamaruddin Abu
- Music by: Ant Bohun; Mokhzani Ismail
- Production companies: Filem Negara Malaysia (FNM); National Film Development Corporation Malaysia (FINAS)
- Distributed by: Skop Productions
- Release date: 1 August 2002 (Malaysia)
- Running time: 135 minutes
- Country: Malaysia
- Languages: Malay; Japanese
- Budget: RM3 million
- Box office: RM142,000

Embun (Dewdrop) is a 2002 Malaysian historical period drama film directed by Erma Fatima who also wrote the story with Rohiman Haroon. The film is co-produced by Filem Negara Malaysia (FNM) and the National Film Development Corporation Malaysia (FINAS).

The movie tells the story of Embun, a woman who fights for her brother's after he is captured by the Japanese army for resisting the Japanese invasion. The film stars Umie Aida in the titular role, as well as Aqasha, Hani Mohsin, Rahim Razali, Ahmad Tarmimi Siregar, Khatijah Tan and Izi Yahya. The film's dialogue uses both Malay and Japanese language as it is sets during the Japanese occupation of Malaya.

== Development and release ==
Originally titled Titisan Air Mata Embun (Teardrops of a Dew), it is the first film to be co-produced by FNM and FINAS–the two Malaysian film regulatory bodies under the Ministry of Information –with a production cost of RM3 million. Filming took place in July and September 2001 in Penang, Perlis and Perak.

Embun was released on 1 August 2002 in Malaysian cinemas. Despite receiving positive reviews, the film was a commercial failure when it only earned a box office collection of RM142,000. However, the film won 6 out of 10 nominations at the 2003 Anugerah Skrin and 7 out of 12 nominations at the 16th Malaysian Film Festival. Although the film's artistic aspects were well received, it also faced criticism.

== Plot ==
Embun, is an ordinary village resident living during the Japanese occupation of Malaya. She is 17 years old, and is a Malay woman with a strong spirit of liberation and a fighting spirit. She is unlike other women of her time who are always stuck in the kitchen or give in to male domination. Embun’s brother, Bayu, is the main driving force of the Young Malay Union in Bayan Lepas, Penang. They both believe that the arrival of Japan can be used to the best of her ability to free the Malays from the clutches of the British colonialists. Bayu is an Arab school graduate and a loyal follower of the founder of KMM, Ibrahim Haji Yaakob and a ward of Dr. Burhanuddin Al-Helmy. They readily believe in the slogans "Asia for Asians" and "Greater East Asia Co-Prosperity Sphere" that the Japanese government have been propagating in the lead up to their invasion.

One day, a year after the arrival of the Japanese, Bayu is arrested for holding a protest rally against the Japanese. Embun plucks up the courage to try to meet General Kurugawa to request the release of his brother. Unfortunately, she is captured by Lieutenant Akishi and gang-raped. Lieutenant Koishi, a Japanese soldier who had just been transferred there, sees the torture and saves Embun.

Not long after, Embun’s father, Pak Harun, is killed causing her more sadness. After this incident, Embun becomes more passionate in her resistance and holds a grudge against the Japanese army. However, with Koishi's help, Embun meets General Kurugawa to discuss Bayu's release. As part of the terms of his release, he is required to work with Koishi persuading the Malays to support the Japanese through a development program in Kampung Bukit, Bayan Lepas.

Embun and Koishi's relationship grew closer like that of lovers.Lieutenant Akishi becomes suspicious, and later discovers that Koishi has betrayed the Japanese occupation by helping the Malays fight them. As a result, he wants Koishi and Embun to be executed. Koishi dies at the end of the story after being killed, and Embun’s avenges his death, stabbing Akishi.

== Cast ==
- Umie Aida as Embun, a young woman who becomes involved in the anti-Japanese struggle after her brother Bayu's arrest, the death of her father and her victimisation at the hands of Lieutenant Akashi.
- Aqasha as Lieutenant Koishi, a Japanese military officer who has a good character and dislikes the cruelty committed by Akishi and Saito.
- Hani Mohsin as Bayu Harun, the older brother of Embun and the former chief of KMM Bayan Lepas who championed Malay rights.
- Izi Yahya as Lieutenant Akishi, a Japanese military officer who has no feelings and commits wrongdoings including raping Embun and torturing Bayu.
- Ahmad Tarmimi Siregar as General Kurugawa, the Japanese military chief of the northern territory.
- Khatijah Tan as Mak Temah, Embun's and Bayu's mother.
- Aziz Sattar as Pak Mail
- Mak Kwai Yuen as Saito, Akishi's right-hand man.
- Riezman Khuzaimi as Majid, Bayu's best friend that helps his struggles and Embun.
- Razak Ahmad as Hassan, Bayu's friend who conspires with Akishi.
- Ropie Cecupak as Kadir
- Zul Huzaimy as Rashid
- Loloq as Non Cabai
- Zuhairi Ibrahim as Amin
- Rahim Razali as Pak Harun
- Ellie Suriati as Melati
- Ismail Din as Pak Melati
- Normah Damanhuri as Mak Melati
- Haeriyanto Hassan as Kamal
