= Brunei Polytechnic =

Public polytechnic school in Brunei

- Politeknik Brunei (Malay) ڤوليتيكنيك بروني (Jawi)
- Motto: Quality with Integrity
- Type: Polytechnic school
- Established: 18 October 2008
- Founder: Sultan Hassanal Bolkiah
- Chairperson: Pengiran Zety Sufina
- Director: Pengiran Saiful Baharin (Acting)
- Deputy Chairperson: Awang Haji Mohamad Azmi
- Location: Block 2E, Ong Sum Ping Condominiums, Jalan Ong Sum Ping, Bandar Seri Begawan, BA 1311, Brunei Darussalam; 4.9048290°N 114.9330824°E
- Campus: Metropolitan and regional with multiple sites
- Website: www.pb.edu.bn

The Politeknik Brunei (PB or Brunei Polytechnic) is a polytechnic school situated in Bandar Seri Begawan, the capital of Brunei, founded in 2008.

== History ==
In a titah (speech) given on 18 October 2008, at the celebration of Teacher's Day, Sultan Hassanal Bolkiah approved the creation of PB with the goal of accelerating the development of the nation's human resources, a goal highlighted by the National Development Plan (RKN) and Wawasan Brunei 2035. The nation's need for a skilled workforce both now and in the future was directly impacted by the local and global economic landscape's growth, which prompted the reform of technical education.

In January 2012, PB began operation, offering nine two-year Advanced Diploma programs in a variety of subjects including business, ICT, science, and engineering. July 2015 marked the relaunch of the school's 3-year Level 5 Diploma programs, which had been discontinued three years earlier. Students with a minimum of five GCE 'O' Level credits (depending on relevant subjects) and those with technical and vocational education and training (TVET) qualifications were eligible to apply. The Higher National Diploma (HND) is equal to the new Level 5 Diploma certification.

On 27 November 2017, Bureau Veritas (BV) granted PB the International Organization for Standardization (ISO) 9001:2015 certification, marking the institution's first certification as a higher education institution in Brunei.

== Academic profile ==
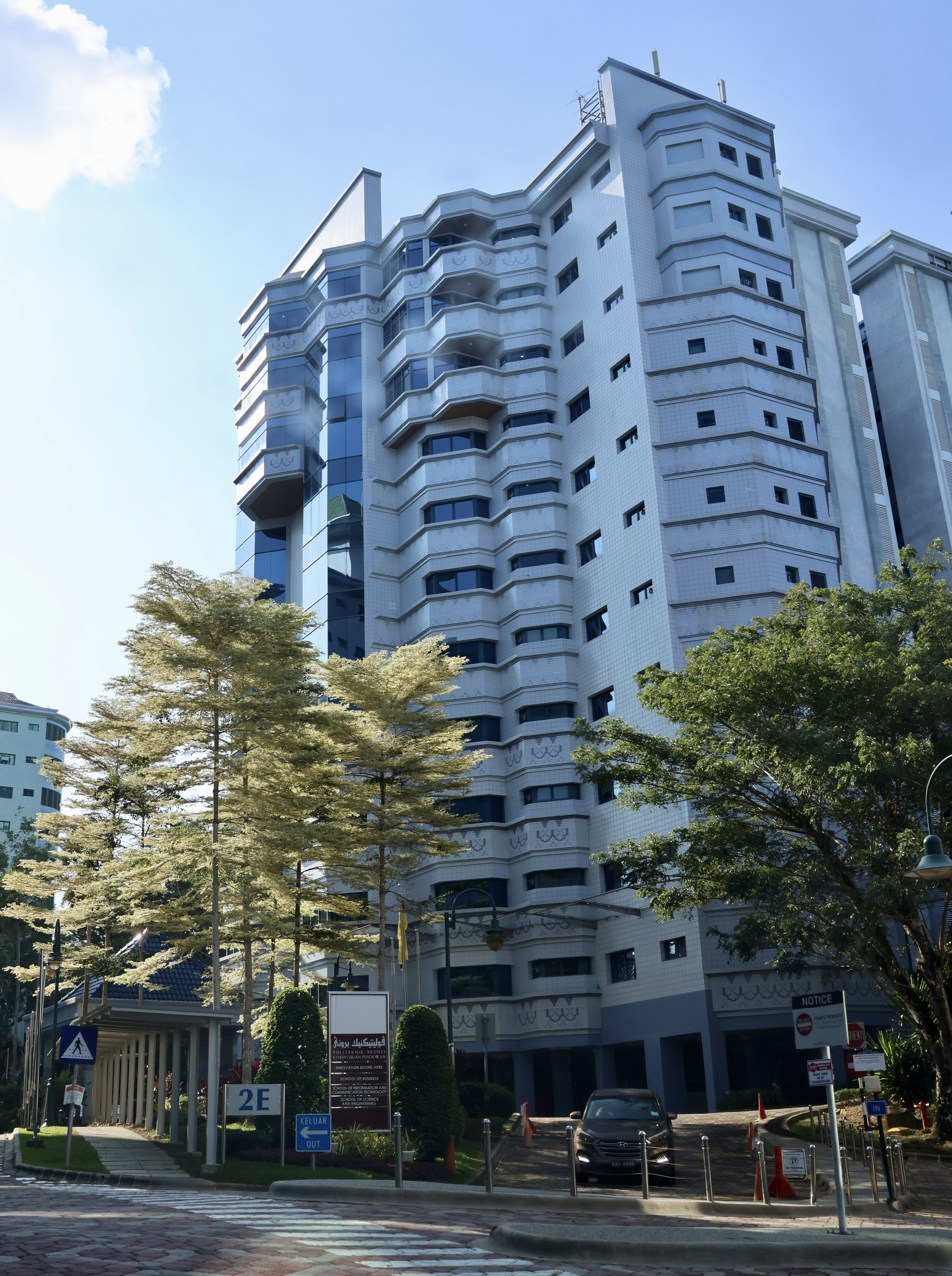
PB main campus in 2024

PB has five schools with each offering 33 Level 5 Diploma programs since 2022.

=== Schools and programmes ===
Through its Level 5 Diploma courses in Business Accounting & Finance and Business Studies, the latter of which offers specialisations in entrepreneurship, marketing, and human resource management, the School of Business (SBS).

The School of Health Sciences (SHS) was founded in 2015 as a result of the transfer of the three Level 4 Diploma programs from the Universiti Brunei Darussalam Pengiran Anak Puteri Rashidah Sa'adatul Bolkiah (UBD PAPRSB) Institute of Health Science to PB. With updated programs starting in July 2018, this institution is now offering Level 5 Diplomas in nursing, midwifery, and paramedic. With a three-year curriculum spread over six semesters at the PAPRSB Institute of Health Sciences, lecture rooms, a simulation centre, a clinical skills lab, and an anatomy resource room are among the facilities. In addition to working with government organisations and professional associations, the school applies Melayu Islam Beraja (MIB) traditional values into its operations.

Since its founding in January 2012, School of Information and Communication Technology (SICT) first offered advanced diplomas in web computing, information systems and technology, and computer networks. Since then, it has added new diploma programs in digital media and information science. Under the direction of the Head of School and Assistant Head, with assistance from twenty professors, SICT is investigating the integration of industry certifications and is in the process of updating its curriculum to align with the Brunei ICT Industry Competency Framework (BIICF). The educational establishment oversees the LMS and intends to implement a 'E-Learning Unit' to augment LMS and e-learning endeavours.

The School of Science and Engineering (SSE) follows the advice of the Programme Advisory Committee (PAC), which is composed of individuals from both the public and private sectors. The school is collaborating with the Department of Quality Assurance (QA) and seeking accreditation from the Institution of Engineering and Technology (IET) UK.

The School of Petrochemical offers Level 5 Diploma programs in various specialised fields, including chemical engineering, chemical equipment technology, laboratory technology, storage and transportation technology, thermal power plant technology, power plant and power system, and water treatment technology. The curriculum has a three-year length. The program's objective is to generate competent petrochemical operators to satisfy the requirements of Hengyi Industries and associated industries.

To better meet the demands of the business, PB has relaunched eight Level 5 Diploma programs and condensed their three-year term to thirty months. These adjustments included working with the Lifelong Learning Centre (L3C) to help first-year students from the School of Business and the School of Information and Communication Technology. These announcements were made during PB's 13th intake orientation on 16 January 2024.

=== International partnerships ===
PB is an institutional member of the Oracle Academy. Additionally, PB has partnered with Institute of Technical Education and Universiti Teknologi MARA.

== Campus ==
=== Main campus ===
The main campus in Brunei-Muara is a temporary campus, located in one of the condominiums at Jalan Ong Sum Ping in Bandar Seri Begawan. UBD PAPRSB was conducted by PB at the university campus.

=== Lumut campus ===
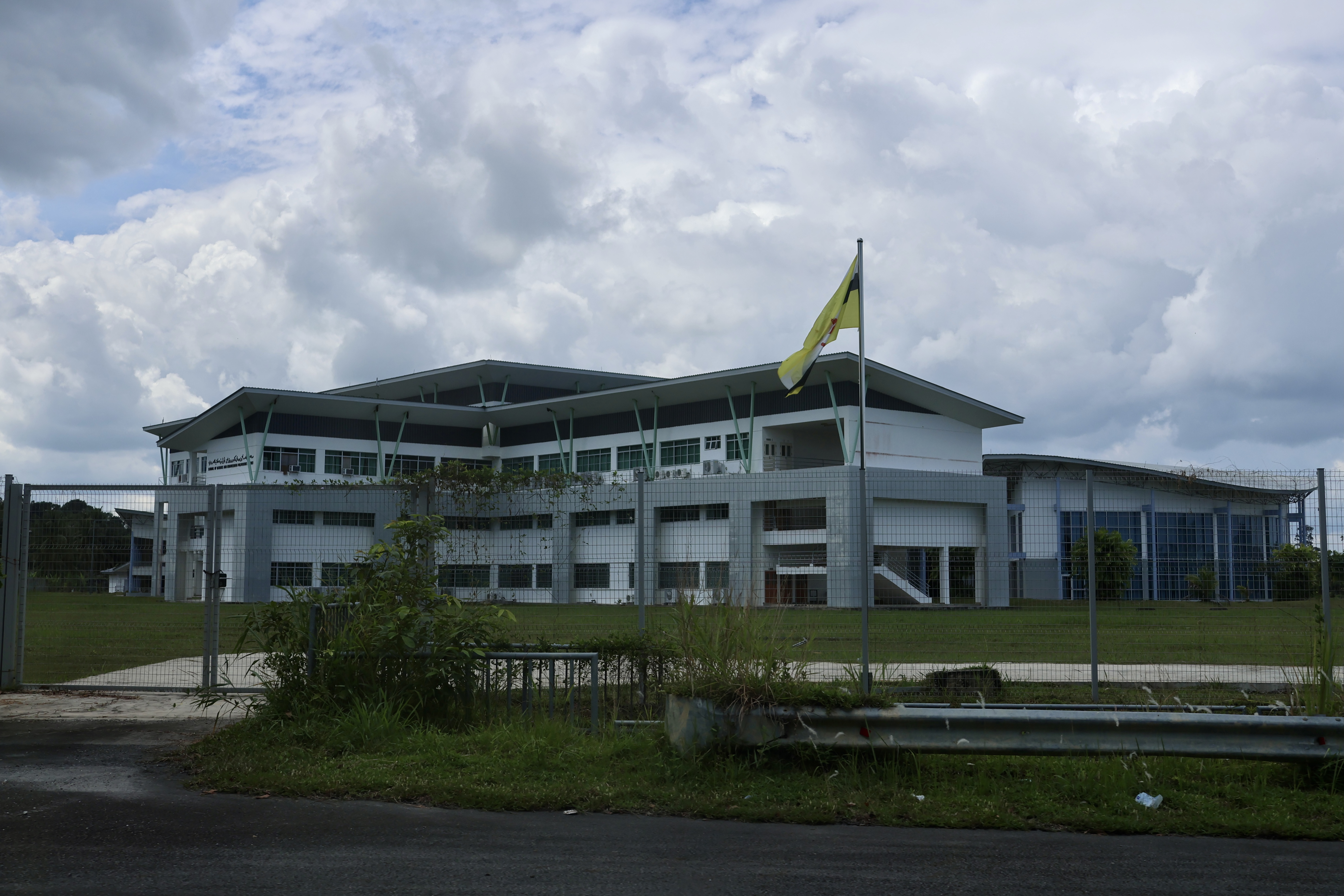
Lumut campus in 2023

Situated near the village of Lumut, Belait District, the campus is home to SSE.

On 20 June 2020, Brunei Shell Petroleum (BSP) donated a pumpjack unit to the university to enhance students' practical skills and prepare them for careers in the oil and gas industry. An updated electrical system with a 20kW ground-mounted solar net-metering system with micro-inverters was added to Lumut Campus in 2023. PB began its trial program from 1 July to 31 December 2023, using a newly suggested working days and hours. Under the guidelines of the Politeknik Brunei Five-Year Development Plan 2021–2025, the Department of Electrical Services (DES) and the SSE are collaborating on the 'Tenaga Lestari' Project. The initiative, which was introduced at the campus, in the afternoon of 6 June 2024, is to upgrade the facilities and raise the standard of instruction.

== Controversies ==
=== Management issues ===
Sultan Hassanal Bolkiah voiced concerns about PB insufficient and inconsistent policies up until that time during an impromptu visit to PB and its associated campuses in October 2020. He condemned the institution for its poor management and its association with Hengyi Industries, pointing out that the latter's use of foreign labour was necessitated by problems with local competency. Although PB expanded in 2015 to offer Level 5 Diploma programs, including those in petrochemical engineering, and despite its ambition to generate innovative, marketable graduates, the Sultan questioned the suitability of PB's faculty and infrastructure. To handle the increasing number of students, he advocated the possibility of creating a new campus and underlined the significance of cautious, quality-focused expansion.

== Notable alumni ==
- Zul F (born 1980), singer-songwriter and actor
- Nur Asyraffahmi Norsamri (born 2000), national footballer
