= National Film Development Corporation Malaysia =

Malaysian government agency

- Perbadanan Kemajuan Filem Nasional Malaysia (FINAS)

Agency overview
- Formed: 26 July 1980; 46 years ago
- Jurisdiction: Government of Malaysia
- Headquarters: Studio Merdeka Complex, Ulu Klang Road, 68000 Ampang, Selangor
- Ministers responsible: Fahmi Fadzil, Minister of Communications and Multimedia; Teo Nie Ching, Deputy Minister of Communications and Multimedia
- Agency executives: Dato' Kamil Othman, Chairman; Vacant, Director General; Azmir Saifuddin Mutalib, Chief Executive Officer
- Parent department: Ministry of Communications and Multimedia
- Website: www.finas.gov.my

The National Film Development Corporation Malaysia (Malay: Perbadanan Kemajuan Filem Nasional Malaysia), abbreviated FINAS, is the central government agency and governing body for the film industry of Malaysia. Its role is to regulate economic and commercial matters related to the film industry in Malaysia and responsible for film policies and programs to ensure the economic, cultural and educational development of the Malaysian film industry as well as providing funds to filmmakers and film studios. FINAS is similar to the Film Development Council of the Philippines in the Philippines and Motion Picture Association of America in the United States. Following its merger with Filem Negara Malaysia (FNM) in 2013 to form a sole film regulatory body, FINAS operated as an independent statutory body separated from remuneration and become financially independent.

== History ==
Malaysian film authority was split into two separate bodies in 1980 – namely Filem Negara Malaysia and the National Film Development Corporation Malaysia. Prior to 2013, both film agencies have different respective roles, with FINAS focused on financial, commercial and economic matters while Filem Negara Malaysia focused on production, documentation and technical aspects.

The National Film Development Corporation (FINAS) is the result of a decision made by the National Film Development Committee set up by the Malaysian government on 26 July 1980 to devise ways to develop a film company in Malaysia. The result of the National Film Development Committee's National Film Development Corporation was set up on 1 June 1981, and started operation in Jalan Ampang then moved to Studio Merdeka Complex, Hulu Kelang on 19 December 1988, when Tan Sri Abdul Samad Idris was the chairman of Finas.

Starting from 27 December 2004, FINAS was later placed under the Ministry of Culture, Arts and Heritage of Malaysia and was the agency of the Ministry of Arts and Heritage Culture Unity beginning in 2008. From April 2008, FINAS was placed under the Ministry of Information, Communication and Culture.

FINAS is involved in the promotion of filming in Malaysia, and with the implementation of the Investors Promotion Act, 1986 also censored local film and video production activities. Finas also established the Film Academy in 1987, aimed at providing short term formal training, certificate and diploma levels to employees interested in film production. In addition, local filmmakers also enjoy the government's financial incentives under the Entertainment Grants Scheme.

To encourage filmmaking in Malaysia, FINAS also provided assistance in the form of loan facilities and rental of shooting equipment as well as film production facilities, preview halls and studios. The government also assisted local filmmakers by offering 50% off government television advertisements by the Ministry of Information. The government has also enforced the Compulsory Terms from January 1991 in the effort to develop the Malaysian film industry administered by Finas.

On 10 April 2019, actor and producer Hans Isaac served as the Chairman of FINAS, succeeding Samsuni Mohd Nor. He resigned from his position on 22 May 2020 and was taken over by Zakaria Abdul Hamid, a day later, on 23 May.

On 23 July 2020, the Communications and Multimedia Ministry announced that it would impose licensing on all video recording in Malaysia, which included social media posts. This was revoked 2 days later, on 25 July 2020.

In March 2026, FINAS announced that it would relocated to its new corporate headquarters named FINAS Tower in Damansara Damai by May, while keeping its current headquarters in Hulu Klang.

== Overview ==
=== Malaysian Film Festival ===
Malaysian Film Festival (Malay: Festival Filem Malaysia), is a film award ceremony carried by Entertainment Journalists Association of Malaysia (EJA) to appreciate and honouring the products of film arts and artists. The formal ceremony at which the awards are presented is one of the most prominent award ceremonies and the highlights for the film industry in Malaysia and is televised live on local television, annually. It is considered to be Malaysia's own equivalent to the Academy Awards in the United States and it is among the major annual awards presented in Malaysia, alongside the Anugerah Bintang Popular for the entire entertainment industry, and Anugerah Industri Muzik for the music industry. Starting with the third inauguration, FFM was no longer being organise by EJA, but instead taken over by Finas after the second organisation of the awards ceremony.

=== Skim Wajib Tayang ===
The Skim Wajib Tayang (Compulsory Screening Scheme) is a regulation that conducted by FINAS to authorise a Compulsory Scheme Committee to consider and accept any local film or joint venture film (local and overseas) for compulsory viewing on the movie hall by the cinema operators, in accordance with the provisions of the Finas' Order which enforced on 23 June 2005 and has been revamped in 2016.

=== Merger with Filem Negara Malaysia ===
In November 2012, former Information, Communication and Culture Minister, Rais Yatim announced that FINAS and Filem Negara Malaysia (FNM) will be merged to form a sole film regulatory body. The merger is said "to optimise staff and financials, as well as making the film industry more competitive" and will see the FINAS reabsorbing Filem Negara Malaysia's technical functions, in addition to its own economic and commercial oversight activities. The merger was completed on 15 May 2013 and was made to make FINAS would be responsible for the development of the local film industry to avoid wastage of funds and overlapping of provision of infrastructure. Many of the FINAS staffs were remained with the agency while others have been let go as part of their restructuring after the merger. The decision of merger between FINAS and Filem Negara was proposed in 1991, but delayed several times due to legal issues. The combined entity retained the corporation's name and FINAS officially become the sole regulatory body for the film industry in Malaysia. After its merger with Filem Negara Malaysia, FINAS restructured as an independent statutory body separated from remuneration and become financially independent.

=== Film in Malaysia Incentive ===
Film in Malaysia Incentive is a program introduced by Finas in October 2014 as a historic step that will make Malaysia the preferred destination and film production hub.

=== Digital restoration ===
Since 2020, FINAS have digitally restored selected documentary films it did not produced from Filem Negara Malaysia's archive, which has been aired on Bernama as well as Finas' YouTube channel under the Retrospektif banner. As of 2025, FINAS has digitized, restored, and remastered over 200 documentary films and 20 feature films from Filem Negara Malaysia's back catalogue.

=== Funding programs ===
Finas runs two funding programs for Malaysian filmmakers, namely the Digital Content Fund (Dana Kandungan Digital or DKD), which introduced in 2015 to strengthening the production of high-quality creative content to greater heights, and the National Film Production Fund (Dana Penerbitan Filem Kenegaraan or DEKAN), which introduced in 2022 to spearheading the production of patriotical films.

== Act and functions ==
FINAS' functions are clearly defined by the FINAS Act 1980. Among the functions of the corporation include:

- Regulates economic matters related to film industry
- Providing mechanism for film practitioners protection
- Providing mechanism for dispute resolutions between film industry players
- Providing allocations and funds
- Advised the Government on economic issues

== See also ==
- Cinema of Malaysia
- Filem Negara Malaysia
- Film Censorship Board of Malaysia
