= Exposures =

Exposures can refer to:

- Andy Warhol's Exposures
- Exposures – In Retrospect and Denial
- The Exposures, a stage name of German electronic musician Jan Jelinek

== See also ==
- exposure
