= Expo Center =

This is a list of places named Expo Center or Expo Centre.

== Belgium ==
- Tilmans Expo Centre, Bree, Limburg

== Canada ==
- Edmonton Expo Centre, Edmonton, Alberta
- Science World (Vancouver), originally the Expo 86 Expo Centre, Vancouver, British Columbia

== China ==
- Hong Kong Convention and Expo Centre, Hong Kong
- Shanghai New International Expo Center, Shanghai

== Netherlands ==
- Frisian Expo Centre, Leeuwarden, Friesland

== Pakistan ==
- Expo Centre Lahore, Johar Town, Lahore
- Karachi Expo Centre, Gulshan Town, Karachi

== Russia ==
- Moscow Expo Center, Moscow

== South Africa ==
- Expo Centre Johannesburg, Gauteng

== Turkey ==
- Antalya Expo Center, Antalya, Antalya

== United Arab Emirates ==
- Expo Centre Sharjah, Sharjah

== United States ==
- Americraft Expo Center, West Palm Beach, Florida
- Bell County Expo Center, Belton, Texas
- Birch Run Expo Center, Birch Run, Michigan
- Cedar Creek Ice & Expo Center, Wausau, Wisconsin
- Chisholm Trail Expo Center, Enid, Oklahoma
- Cocoa Expo Sports Center, Cocoa, Florida
- Eastern Kentucky Expo Center, Pikeville, Kentucky
- Empire Expo Center, Syracuse, New York
- Fair Expo Center, Miami, Florida
- Industry Hills Expo Center, Industry, California
- Kansas Expo Center, Topeka, Kansas
- Kentucky Expo Center, Louisville, Kentucky
- Lone Star Expo Center, Conroe, Texas
- Macomb Sports and Expo Center, Warren, Michigan
- Odeum Expo Center, Villa Park, Illinois
- Ohio Expo Center and State Fairgrounds, Columbus, Ohio
- Pennsylvania Farm Show Complex & Expo Center, Harrisburg, Pennsylvania
- Portland Expo Center, Portland, Oregon
  - Expo Center (MAX station), Portland, Oregon
- Sands Expo and Convention Center, Las Vegas, Nevada
- Shrine Expo Center, Los Angeles, California
- Taylor County Expo Center, Abilene, Texas
- Tulsa Expo Center, Tulsa, Oklahoma
- Volusia County Fair and Expo Center, DeLand, Florida

== See also ==
- Expo (disambiguation)
- List of convention and exhibition centers
