= Expose =

Expose, exposé, exposed, or exposing may refer to:

== News sources ==
- Exposé (journalism), a form of investigative journalism
- The Exposé, a British conspiracist website
- Exeposé, a student-run newspaper of the University of Exeter

== Film and TV ==
=== Film ===
- Exposé (film), a 1976 thriller film
- Exposed (1932 film), a 1932 film starring Barbara Kent
- Exposed (1938 film), a 1938 film starring Glenda Farrell
- Exposed (1947 film), a 1947 film starring Adele Mara
- Exposed (1983 film), a 1983 film starring Nastassja Kinski
- Exposed (2003 film), a 2003 American independent comedy film
- Exposed (2011 film), a 2011 film starring Jodi Lyn O'Keefe
- Exposed (2016 film), a 2016 film starring Keanu Reeves

=== Television ===
- "Exposé" (Lost), a 2007 episode of Lost
- Exposé: America's Investigative Reports, a PBS news/documentary series
- eXposed, the pilot of the American television show The Gifted
- Exposed (American game show), a 2007 American dating game show that aired on MTV
- Exposed (Canadian TV program), a 2004 Canadian music television program that aired on MuchMusic
- Exposed (Indian TV series), a 2022 Indian Telugu-language web series
- "Exposed" (Heroes), a 2009 episode of Heroes
- "Exposed" (UFO) (UFO), a 1970 episode of UFO

== Music ==
- Exposé (group), a 1980s and 1990s vocal group that reformed in 2006

=== Albums ===
- Exposé (Exposé album), 1992
- Exposé (Paul Murphy and Larry Willis album), 2008
- Expose (Shizuka Kudo album), 1994
- Exposed (Boom Boom Satellites album), 2007
- Exposed (Chanté Moore album)
- Exposed (CoCo Lee album)
- Exposed (Kristinia DeBarge album)
- Exposed (Mike Oldfield album), 1979
- Exposed (Vince Neil album), 1993
- Exposed (Kiss), a 1987 video by Kiss
- Exposed (Mike Oldfield video), a 1979 live concert video by Mike Oldfield

=== Song ===
- "Expose" (song), a 2013 song by Japanese boy band KAT-TUN
- "Exposé", song from the musical Zombie Prom

== Other ==
- Exposé, now Mission Control, a window management tool for macOS
- Exposed (heights), situation with a significant risk of falling from heights e.g. when climbing
- EXPOSE, astrobiology equipment on the International Space Station
- The Exposed (novel), a novel in the Animorphs series, by K.A. Applegate
- Expose, Mississippi, an unincorporated community in Marion County, Mississippi
- Exposing to the right, a photographic technique

== See also ==
- Exeposé, the University of Exeter student newspaper
- expo.se, website for Swedish magazine Expo
- Exposure (disambiguation)
- Exposition (disambiguation)
- Xposé, Irish television programme
- The Xposé, 2014 Hindi film
- Xposed, album by G.E.M.
- X-Posed (R.O.C. album)
