= List of Disney+ Hotstar original programming =

List of original shows by Disney+ Hotstar

This article is a list of streaming television programming that has been released on Disney+ Hotstar, or just Hotstar, (Note: in Singapore, Canada and the United Kingdom) an Indian subscription video on-demand over-the-top streaming service owned by JioStar and operated by the Disney Entertainment division of The Walt Disney Company since its launch as Hotstar in February 2015 by the formerly-named Star India.

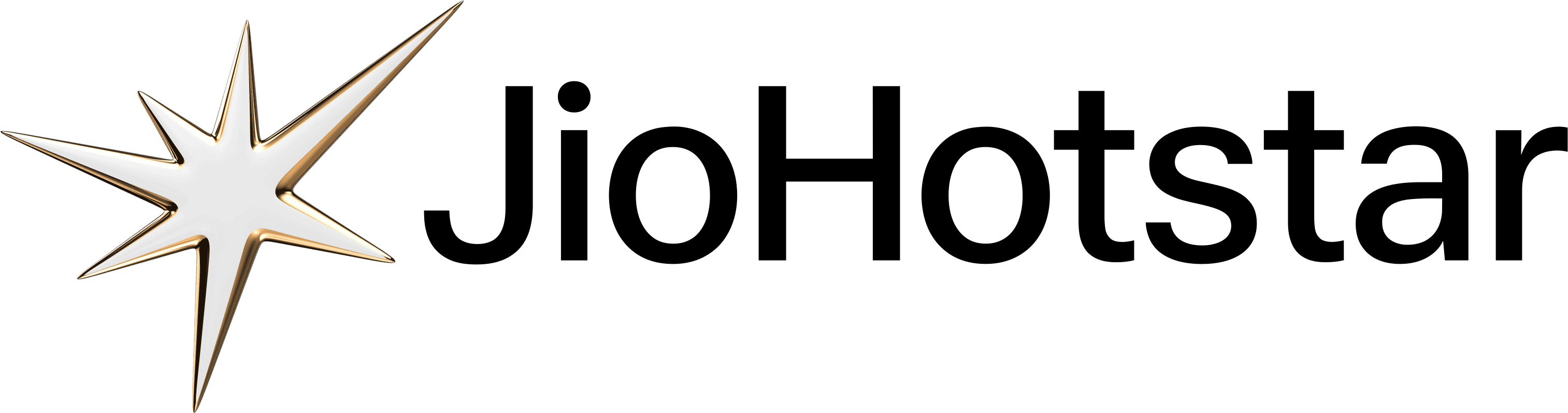

In February 2025, Disney+ Hotstar in India was rebranded as JioHotstar following the service's merger with JioCinema. In October 2025, Disney+ Hotstar in Southeast Asia was rebranded as Disney+ following the Star brand was replaced by Hulu.

== Indian original programming ==
=== Hotstar Specials ===
Hotstar Specials is a content hub and label of Hotstar under which the platform releases their original programming created exclusively for the service. The label launched with the docu-drama Roar of the Lion on 20 March 2019.

==== Drama ====
Title	Genre	Premiere	Seasons	Language(s)	Status
Criminal Justice	Crime thriller/Legal drama	5 April 2019	4 seasons, 29 episodes	Hindi	Season 4 ongoing
City of Dreams	Crime drama	3 May 2019 (Note: India); 23 June 2023 (Note: Southeast Asia)	3 seasons, 29 episodes	Hindi	Ended
Hostages	Crime thriller	31 May 2019	2 seasons, 22 episodes	Hindi	Ended
Out of Love	Romantic thriller	22 November 2019	2 seasons, 10 episodes	Hindi	Ended
Special Ops	Espionage thriller	17 March 2020; 30 October 2020	2 seasons, 12 episodes	Hindi	Renewed
Aarya	Crime drama	19 June 2020	3 seasons, 25 episodes	Hindi	Renewed for final season
Live Telecast	Horror	12 February 2021	1 season, 7 episodes	Tamil	Ended
1962: The War in the Hills	War drama	26 February 2021	10 episodes	Hindi	Miniseries
November Story	Crime thriller	20 May 2021	1 season, 7 episodes	Tamil	Ended
Grahan	Drama	24 June 2021	8 episodes	Hindi	Miniseries
The Empire	Historical fiction	21 August 2021	1 season, 8 episodes	Hindi	Ended
Unheard	Historical fiction	17 September 2021	6 episodes	Telugu	Miniseries
Parampara	Political crime drama	24 December 2021	2 seasons, 12 episodes	Telugu	Ended
Human	Medical thriller	14 January 2022; 12 July 2023	1 season, 10 episodes	Hindi	Renewed
The Great Indian Murder	Mystery	4 February 2022; 28 July 2023	9 episodes	Hindi	Miniseries
Rudra: The Edge of Darkness	Psychological crime drama	4 March 2022	1 season, 6 episodes	Hindi	Renewed
Anupama: Namaste America	Drama	25 April 2022	11 episodes	Hindi	Miniseries
Escaype Live	Science fiction	20 May 2022; 18 August 2023	1 season, 9 episodes	Hindi	Ended
9 Hours	Survival crime drama	2 June 2022	1 season, 9 episodes	Telugu	Ended
Aashiqana	Romantic thriller	6 June 2022	4 seasons, 228 episodes	Hindi	Ended
Masoom	Psychological drama	17 June 2022	1 season, 6 episodes	Hindi	Ended
Shoorveer	Action drama	15 July 2022	1 season, 8 episodes	Hindi	Renewed
Ghar Waapsi	Family drama	22 July 2022	1 season, 12 episodes	Hindi	Ended
Dahan: Raakan Ka Rahasya	Supernatural thriller	16 September 2022	1 season, 9 episodes	Hindi	Ended
Karm Yuddh	Drama	30 September 2022	1 season, 8 episodes	Hindi	Ended
Jhansi	Crime thriller	27 October 2022	2 seasons, 10 episodes	Telugu	Ended
Fall	Action drama	9 December 2022	1 season, 7 episodes	Tamil	Ended
Aar Ya Paar	Thriller drama	30 December 2022	1 season, 8 episodes	Hindi	Ended
Unsorted	Romantic drama	27 January 2023	3 episodes	Hindi	Miniseries
The Night Manager	Spy drama	17 February 2023; 2 June 2023 (Note: Released as a "Star Original")	1 season, 7 episodes	Hindi	Ended
Anger Tales	Family drama	9 March 2023	1 season, 4 episodes	Telugu	Ended
Saas, Bahu Aur Flamingo	Crime drama	5 May 2023	1 season, 8 episodes	Hindi	Ended
School of Lies	Drama thriller	2 June 2023	1 season, 8 episodes	Hindi	Ended
Shaitan	Action thriller	15 June 2023	1 season, 9 episodes	Telugu	Ended
Kerala Crime Files	Crime drama	23 June 2023	2 season, 12 episodes	Malayalam	Renewed
The Trial	Legal drama	14 July 2023	1 season, 8 episodes	Hindi	Renewed
Dayaa	Crime thriller	4 August 2023	1 season, 8 episodes	Telugu	Ended
Commando	Action thriller	11 August 2023	1 season, 4 episodes	Hindi	Ended
Mathagam	Crime drama	18 August 2023	1 season, 9 episodes	Tamil	Ended
Aakhri Sach	Crime thriller	25 August 2023	1 season, 6 episodes	Hindi	Ended
The Freelancer	Action thriller	1 September 2023	1 season, 7 episodes	Hindi	Ended
Kaala	Crime thriller	15 September 2023	1 season, 8 episodes	Hindi	Ended
Athidhi	Horror	19 September 2023	1 season, 6 episodes	Telugu	Ended
Sultan of Delhi	Action thriller	13 October 2023	1 season, 9 episodes	Hindi	Ended
Mansion 24	Horror	17 October 2023	1 season, 6 episodes	Telugu	Ended
Label	Legal drama	8 December 2023	1 season, 10 episodes	Tamil	Ended
Vadhuvu	Drama thriller	8 December 2023	1 season, 7 episodes	Telugu	Ended
Karmma Calling	Crime drama	26 January 2024	1 season, 7 episodes	Hindi	Pending
Showtime	Drama	8 March 2024	1 season, 7 episodes	Hindi	Pending
Lootere	Action drama	22 March 2024	1 season, 8 episodes	Hindi	Pending
Gunaah	Action drama	3 June 2024	2 seasons, 33 episodes	Hindi	Pending
Yakshini	Fantasy romantic thriller	14 June 2024	1 season, 6 episodes	Telugu	Pending
Bad Cop	Crime drama	20 June 2024	1 season, 8 episodes	Hindi	Pending
Commander Karan Saxena	Military action	8 July 2024	1 season, 20 episodes	Hindi	Pending
Goli Soda Rising	Drama	13 September 2024	1 season, 10 episodes	Tamil	Pending
The Mystery of Moksha Island	Horror	20 September 2024	1 season, 8 episodes	Telugu	Pending
1000 Babies	Crime thriller	18 October 2024	1 season, 7 episodes	Malayalam	Renewed
Thukra Ke Mera Pyaar	Romance drama	22 November 2024	2 season, 69 episodes	Hindi	Pending
Parachute	Drama thriller	29 November 2024	1 season, 8 episodes	Tamil	Pending
Harikatha	Fantasy crime thriller	13 December 2024	1 season, 6 episodes	Telugu	Pending
Power of Paanch	Superhero	17 January 2025	1 season, 50 episodes	Hindi	Pending
The Secret of the Shiledars	Action adventure	31 January 2025	1 season, 6 episodes	Hindi	Pending
Kobali	Crime drama	4 February 2025	1 season, 8 episodes	Telugu	Pending
Kanneda	Drama	21 March 2025	1 season, 8 episodes	Hindi	Pending
Om Kali Jai Kali	Supernatural action drama	28 March 2025	1 season, 5 episodes	Tamil	Pending
Touch Me Not	Thriller	4 April 2025	1 season, 6 episodes	Telugu	Pending
Kull: The Legacy of the Raisingghs	Drama thriller	2 May 2025	1 season, 8 episodes	Hindi	Pending
Hai Junoon!	Musical drama	16 May 2025	1 season, 20 episodes	Hindi	Pending
Mistry	mystery comedy-drama	27 June 2025	1 season, 8 episodes	Hindi	Pending
Good Wife	Legal drama	4 July 2025	1 season, 6 episodes	Tamil	Pending
Search: The Naina Murder Case	Crime thriller	10 October 2025	1 season, 6 episodes	Hindi	Pending
Nadu Center	Coming-of-age sports drama	20 November 2025	1 season, 6 episodes	Tamil	Pending
Pharma	Drama	19 December 2025	1 season, 8 episodes	Malayalam	Pending
Mrs. Deshpande	crime thriller	19 December 2025	1 season, 6 episodes	Hindi	Pending
Space Gen: Chandrayaan	Drama	23 January 2026	1 season, 5 episodes	Hindi	Pending
Secret Stories: Roslin	Psychological Thriller	27 February 2026	1 season, 5 episodes	Malayalam	Pending
Chiraiya	drama	20 March 2026	1 season, 6 episodes	Hindi	Pending
Muthu Engira Kaattaan	Action crime drama	27 March 2026	1 season, 10 episodes	Tamil	Ended
Lingam	Crime drama	26 June 2026	1 season, 8 episodes	Tamil	Ended
Pritam and Pedro	cybercrime comedy thriller	3 July 2026	1 season, 6 episodes	Hindi	Pending
Hunkkaar: The Roar	Social thriller Legal drama	25 September 2026	6 episodes	Hindi	Miniseries

==== Comedy ====
Title	Genre	Premiere	Seasons	Language(s)	Status
The Office	Mockumentary sitcom	28 June 2019	2 seasons, 28 episodes	Hindi	Ended
Hundred	Action comedy	25 April 2020	1 season, 8 episodes	Hindi	Ended
Triples	Romantic comedy	11 December 2020	1 season, 8 episodes	Tamil	Ended
OK Computer	Science fiction comedy	26 March 2021	1 season, 6 episodes	Hindi	Ended
Dil Bekaraar	Romantic comedy	26 November 2021	1 season, 10 episodes	Hindi	Ended
Home Shanti	Comedy drama	6 May 2022	1 season, 6 episodes	Hindi	Ended
Taaza Khabar	Supernatural comedy drama	6 January 2023	2 seasons, 12 episodes	Hindi	Pending
Pop Kaun?	Comedy	17 March 2023	1 season, 6 episodes	Hindi	Ended
Save the Tigers	Comedy	27 April 2023	3 seasons, 20 episodes	Telugu	Pending
Dead Pixels	Fantasy sitcom	19 May 2023	1 season, 6 episodes	Telugu	Ended
MY3	Science fiction romantic comedy	15 September 2023	1 season, 9 episodes	Tamil	Ended
Masterpeace	Comedy drama	25 October 2023	1 season, 5 episodes	Malayalam	Ended
Perilloor Premier League	Comedy drama	5 January 2024	1 season, 7 episodes	Malayalam	Ended
Miss Perfect	Romantic comedy	2 February 2024	1 season, 8 episodes	Telugu	Ended
Nagendran's Honeymoons	Romantic comedy	19 July 2024	1 season, 6 episodes	Malayalam	Ended
Chutney Sambar	Comedy drama	26 July 2024	1 season, 6 episodes	Tamil	Ended
Life Hill Gayi	Comedy	9 August 2024	1 season, 6 episodes	Hindi	Pending
Reeta Sanyal	Legal comedy drama	14 October 2024	1 season, 20 episodes	Hindi	Pending
Oops Ab Kya?	Comedy	20 February 2025	1 season, 8 episodes	Hindi	Pending
Love Under Construction	Romantic comedy	28 February 2025	1 season, 6 episodes	Malayalam	Pending
Devika & Danny	Supernatural romantic comedy	6 June 2025	1 season, 7 episodes	Telugu	Pending
Love Always	Fantasy comedy drama	30 October 2026	1 season, 8 episodes	Tamil	Ended

==== Serial ====
Title	Genre	Premiere	Seasons	Language(s)	Status
Kana Kaanum Kaalangal	Teen drama	22 April 2022	3 seasons, 259 episodes	Tamil	Pending
Exposed	Drama thriller	6 October 2022	1 season, 55 episodes	Telugu	Ended
Dear Ishq	Romantic drama	26 January 2023	1 season, 60 episodes	Hindi	Ended
Heart Beat	Medical drama Romantic drama	8 March 2024	3 seasons, 264 episodes	Tamil	Season 3 ongoing
Uppu Puli Kaaram	Romantic family comedy drama	30 May 2024	1 season, 108 episodes	Tamil	Ended
Agnisakshi: Fire of Love	Romance drama	12 July 2024	1 season, 34 episodes	Telugu	Ended
Office	Sitcom; Workplace comedy	21 February 2025	1 season, 100 episodes	Tamil	Ended
Rambo in Love	Romantic comedy	12 September 2025	1 season, 64 episodes	Telugu	Pending
Police Police	Police procedural comedy	19 September 2025	1 season, 100 episodes	Tamil	Season 1 Ended
LBW: Love Beyond Wicket	Coming-of-age sports drama	1 January 2026	1 season, 120 episodes	Tamil	Ended
Vikram On Duty	Police procedural drama	6 March 2026	1 season, 100 episodes	Telugu	Ended
Resort	Culinary; Workplace comedy Sitcom	13 March 2026	1 season, 100 episodes	Tamil	Season 1 Ended
Batchmates	Coming-of-age comedy drama	30 April 2026	1 season, 100 episodes	Telugu	Ended
Brothers and Sisters	Romantic; Family drama Comedy drama	27 May 2026	1 season, 100 episodes	Tamil	Ended
Cousins and Kalyanams	Romantic Comedy	29 May 2026	1 season, 60 episodes	Malayalam	Ended
Part-Timers	Comedy drama Coming-of-age; Sitcom	28 August 2026	1 season, 48 episodes	Telugu	Ongoing
The Court	Legal Drama; Procedural; Romantic	4 September 2026	1 season, 44 episodes	Tamil	Ongoing
Prince of Mollywood	Romantic Comedy	11 September 2026	1 season, 40 episodes	Malayalam	Ongoing
Kappi Squad	Coming-of-age; Comedy drama	15 October 2026	1 season, 20 episodes	Malayalam	Ongoing
Mr & Mrs Office	Romantic; Sitcom; Workplace comedy	18 November 2026	1 season, 4 episodes	Tamil	Ongoing

==== Animation ====
Title	Genre	Premiere	Seasons	Language(s)	Status
The Legend of Hanuman	Mythological fantasy	29 January 2021; 1 June 2021 (Note: Malaysia); 9 June 2023 (Note: Indonesia)	6 seasons, 52 episodes	Hindi	Pending
Baahubali: Crown of Blood	Fantasy adventure	17 May 2024	1 season, 9 episodes	Hindi	Ended

==== Unscripted ====
Title	Genre	Premiere	Seasons	Language	Status
Roar of the Lion	Docuseries	20 March 2019	1 season, 5 episodes	Hindi; Tamil; Telugu	Ended
Bigg Boss Ultimate	Reality	30 January 2022	1 season, 71 episodes	Tamil	Ended
Bigg Boss Non-Stop	Reality	26 February 2022	1 season, 107 episodes	Telugu	Ended
Moving In with Malaika	Reality	5 December 2022	1 season, 16 episodes	English	Ended
Thums Up Toofani Biryani Hunt	Cooking competition	3 May 2023	2 seasons, 13 episodes	Hindi	Ended
Yeh Kya Bana Diya	Cooking show	14 February 2025	1 season, 4 episodes	Hindi	Season 1 ongoing
Bigg Boss Agnipariksha	Reality	22 August 2025	1 season, 15 episodes	Telugu	Renewed
Land of Football	Docuseries	10 July 2026	1 season, 3 episodes	Malayalam	Ended

==== Continuations ====
Title	Genre	Premiere	Previous channel	Seasons	Language	Status
Dance Plus (seasons 6–7)	Dance reality competition	14 September 2021 (Note: Also airs on StarPlus)	StarPlus	2 seasons, 65 episodes	Hindi	Renewed
Koffee with Karan (seasons 7–8)	Talk show	7 July 2022; 26 May 2023	Star World	2 seasons, 26 episodes	English; Hindi	Renewed

=== Hotstar Originals ===
==== Drama ====
Title	Genre	Premiere	Seasons	Length	Language	Status
Shockers	Horror	24 May 2016	2 seasons, 12 episodes	8–16 min	Hindi	Ended
Tanhaiyan	Romantic drama	14 February 2017	1 season, 9 episodes	16–22 min	Hindi	Ended
Pyaar Actually	Romantic drama anthology	18 October 2019	1 season, 4 episodes	7–15 min	Hindi	Ended
Kamathipura	Crime drama	9 April 2021	1 season, 7 episodes	30 min	Hindi	Ended

==== Comedy ====
Title	Genre	Premiere	Seasons	Length	Language	Status
On Air with AIB	News comedy	29 October 2015 (Note: Season 1 also aired on StarPlus (Hindi) and Star World (English))	3 seasons, 23 episodes, 64 segments	23–30 min	Hindi; English	Ended
The Fanatics	Animated shorts	5 April 2017	4 seasons, 118 episodes	3–7 min	English	Ended
As I'm Suffering From Kadhal	Romantic comedy	15 June 2017	1 season, 10 episodes	19–27 min	Tamil; Telugu; Hindi	Ended
PariWar	Comedy	23 September 2020	1 season, 6 episodes	21–25 min	Hindi	Ended
Dabangg	Animated action comedy	26 May 2021	1 season, 16 episodes	11 min	Hindi	Ended

==== Variety ====
Title	Genre	Premiere	Seasons	Length	Language	Status
Bol Viru Bol	Talk show	30 March 2017	2 seasons, 13 episodes	10–14 min	Hindi	Ended
Maximize Your Day	Fitness	25 April 2019	1 season, 7 episodes	2 min	English	Ended
The Cannes Connection	Talk show	21 May 2019	1 season, 5 episodes	29–32 min	Hindi	Ended

==== Continuations ====
Title	Genre	Previous channel	Premiere	Seasons	Length	Language	Status
Phir Bhi Na Maane...Badtameez Dil	Musical romantic drama	StarPlus	28 September 2015	1 season, 42 episodes	21 min	Hindi	Ended
Iss Pyaar Ko Kya Naam Doon – Ek Jashn	Romantic comedy	StarPlus	23 November 2015	1 season, 9 episodes	8–17 min	Hindi	Ended
Sarabhai vs Sarabhai: Take 2	Comedy	STAR One	16 May 2017	1 season, 10 episodes	23–26 min	Hindi	Ended
Son of Abish (season 4)	Talk show	YouTube	6 April 2018	1 season, 8 episodes	31–45 min	English	Ended
Better Life Foundation (season 2)	Comedy	YouTube	10 August 2018	1 season, 6 episodes	22–30 min	English	Ended
Pavithram 2	Romantic drama	Asianet	13 July 2026	1 season	22 min	Malayalam	Ongoing

==== Stage productions ====
Cineplay is an original Hotstar theater series in which plays are presented in cinematic style.

=== Exclusive international distribution ===
Title	Genre	Premiere	Seasons	Language	Exclusive region(s)	Status
Super V	Superhero animation	5 November 2019	1 season, 12 episodes	Hindi	India, Canada and United Kingdom	Ended
MasterChef India (season 6)	Reality competition	7 December 2019	1 season, 25 episodes	Hindi	India, Canada and United Kingdom	Ended

== Southeast Asian original programming ==
Disney+ Hotstar also carried the Southeast Asian original programming that was commissioned exclusively in their respective regions before the service rebranded to Disney+ in these regions.

=== Star Originals ===
All contents was rebranded to Hulu originals since October 8, 2025.

==== Drama ====
Title	Genre	Premiere	Seasons	Runtime	Exclusive region(s)	Language	Status
Virgin: The Series	Teen drama	14 January 2022	10 episodes	46–57 min	Southeast Asia	Indonesian	Miniseries
Wedding Agreement: The Series	Romantic drama	25 March 2022	2 seasons, 20 episodes	40–69 min	Southeast Asia	Indonesian	Ended
What We Lose to Love	Romantic fantasy drama	30 July 2022	12 episodes	28–34 min	Southeast Asia	Indonesian	Miniseries
Keluarga Cemara: The Series	Coming-of-age drama	24 September 2022	8 episodes	43–47 min	Southeast Asia	Indonesian	Miniseries
Between Two Hearts	Romantic thriller	17 December 2022	1 season, 8 episodes	48–51 min	Southeast Asia	Indonesian	Ended
Special Force: Anarchy (Note: Unavailable)	Action crime drama	14 January 2023	7 episodes	41–88 min	Southeast Asia	Malay	Ended
Blood Curse	Horror drama	25 February 2023	10 episodes	41–49 min	Southeast Asia	Indonesian	Miniseries
Jurnal Risa	Horror drama	27 May 2023	10 episodes	43–50 min	Southeast Asia	Indonesian	Miniseries
Pernikahan Dini	Teen drama	23 September 2023	10 episodes	46–49 min	Southeast Asia	Indonesian	Miniseries
Tira	Superhero fantasy	16 December 2023	8 episodes	48–52 min	Southeast Asia	Indonesian	Miniseries

==== Comedy ====
Title	Genre	Premiere	Seasons	Runtime	Exclusive region(s)	Language	Status
Susah Sinyal: The Series	Comedy drama	29 October 2021; 14 January 2022 (Note: Malaysia and Thailand)	12 episodes	36–45 min	Southeast Asia	Indonesian	Miniseries
The Talent Agency	Comedy drama	29 July 2023	1 season, 6 episodes	38–46 min	Southeast Asia	Indonesian	Ended

==== Animation ====
Title	Genre	Premiere	Seasons	Runtime	Exclusive region(s)	Language	Status
Si Juki Anak Kosan	Sitcom	29 January 2021; 23 July 2021	13 episodes	12–13 min	Indonesia & Malaysia	Indonesian	Miniseries
Warkop DKI Kartun: The Series	Sitcom	10 May 2021; 18 June 2021	13 episodes	14–15 min	Indonesia & Malaysia	Indonesian	Miniseries

==== Continuations ====
Title	Genre	Premiere	Prev. network(s)	Seasons	Runtime	Exclusive region(s)	Language	Status
The John Dykes Show	Sports talk show	3 December 2021	Fox Sports Asia	1 season, 27 episodes	48–66 min	Southeast Asia	English	Ended

=== Exclusive shows ===
==== Drama ====
Title	Genre	Premiere	Seasons	Runtime	Exclusive region(s)	Language	Status
Semanis Senyumanmu [ms]	Romantic drama	1 June 2021 (Note: Also aired on TV3 beginning 10 July 2021)	16 episodes	24–26 min	Malaysia	Malay	Miniseries
Extraordinary Siamese Story: Eng and Chang	Biographical drama	30 June 2021	13 episodes	37–45 min	Thailand	English; Thai	Miniseries
55:15 Never Too Late	Coming-of-age drama	6 December 2021 (Note: Also aired on GMM25 beginning 6 January 2022.)	16 episodes	41–46 min	Thailand	Thai	Miniseries
Cupid's Last Wish	Romantic fantasy	21 February 2022	10 episodes	44–50 min	Thailand	Thai	Miniseries
Good Old Days	Anthology drama	10 August 2022	12 episodes	46 min	Thailand	Thai	Miniseries

==== Comedy ====
Title	Genre	Premiere	Seasons	Runtime	Exclusive region(s)	Language	Status
Wifi Sebelah Rumah	Romantic comedy	25 June 2021	16 episodes	24 min	Malaysia	Malay	Miniseries

==== Animation ====
Title	Genre	Premiere	Seasons	Runtime	Exclusive region(s)	Language	Status
The Beachbuds	Workplace comedy	27 August 2021; 8 October 2021; 1 April 2022 (Note: Thailand)	52 episodes	11 min	Southeast Asia	English	Miniseries

==== Co-productions ====
Title	Genre	Partner/Country	Premiere	Seasons	Runtime	Exclusive region(s)	Language	Status
Ejen Ali (season 3)	Animated action spy-fi thriller	TV3/Malaysia (Note: The first two seasons also previously aired on Disney Channel Asia.)	25 June 2022	1 season, 13 episodes	20–24 min	Southeast Asia	Malay	Ended

== Disney+ Originals ==

These shows are commissioned by Disney+ and are available exclusively on the platform in India and selected Southeast Asian countries as Disney+ was integrated within the service in April 2020.

=== Co-productions ===
These shows have been commissioned by Disney+ in cooperation with a partner network.

Title	Genre	Partner/Country	Premiere	Seasons	Runtime	Language	Exclusive regions	Status
In the Soop: Friendcation	Reality show	JTBC/South Korea	22 July 2022	4 episodes	53–62 min	Korean	All markets	Miniseries

=== Continuations ===
These shows have been picked up by Disney+ for additional seasons after having aired previous seasons on another network.

Title	Genre	Premiere	Prev. network(s)	Seasons	Length / Runtime	Language(s)	Exclusive region(s)	Status
Club Mickey Mouse Malaysia (season 4)	Variety	28 July 2021; 17 November 2021 (Note: Indonesia and Thailand)	Disney Channel Asia	1 season, 13 episodes	22–24 min	English; Malay	Southeast Asia	Ended

== Exclusive distribution ==
 Note:
Shows that labelled with ≈ imply the shows that
- originally came from Hulu Originals, Star Originals and Star+ Originals on the original network Hulu, Star and Star+, rebranded then as Hotstar Originals within the platform for the served regions and markets.
- being bought by Disney for distribution rights and rebranded then as Hotstar Originals within the platform for the served regions and markets.

=== Exclusive international distribution ===
The following shows are the general entertainment from Disney subsidiaries, including FX, Freeform, Hulu, Star, Star+, ABC Signature, 20th Television, 20th Television Animation for streaming exclusively on Disney+ Hotstar. (Note: Not to be confused with the contents released on Star content hub (now Hulu content hub) from Disney+, and Star+.) This list also includes content from Disney's kids' networks that doesn't air on television in served regions.

==== Drama ====
Title	Genre	Original network	Premiere	Seasons	Runtime	Exclusive region(s)	Status
Feud	Biographical anthology	FX	5 March 2017	2 seasons, 16 episodes	45–63 min.	All markets	Pending
Genius	Biographical anthology	National Geographic	25 April 2017	4 seasons, 36 episodes	44–57 min	All markets	Pending
Snowfall	Crime drama	FX	6 September 2017	6 seasons, 60 episodes	41–58 min	India	Ended
9-1-1	Procedural drama	Fox (seasons 1–6); ABC (season 7)	3 January 2018	8 seasons, 124 episodes	42–45 min	All markets	Renewed
Station 19	Action drama	ABC	22 March 2018	7 seasons, 105 episodes	46–70 min	All markets	Ended
Mayans M.C.	Crime drama	FX	5 September 2018	5 seasons, 50 episodes	46–70 min	India	Ended
Godfather of Harlem	Crime drama	EPIX (seasons 1–2); MGM+ (season 3)	30 September 2019; 1 January 2021	3 seasons, 30 episodes	49–59 min	All markets	Renewed
9-1-1: Lone Star	Procedural drama	Fox	17 February 2020	5 seasons, 72 episodes	42–48 min	All markets	Ended
Little Fires Everywhere ≈	Drama	Hulu	18 March 2020	8 episodes	53–66 min	India	Miniseries
Filthy Rich	Soap opera	FOX	22 September 2020	1 season, 10 episodes	41–44 min	India	Ended
Next	Science fiction crime drama	FOX	7 October 2020	1 season, 10 episodes	43–45 min	India	Ended
Helstrom ≈	Superhero/Dark fantasy	Hulu	1 November 2020	1 season, 10 episodes	44–55 min	Southeast Asia	Ended
A Teacher ≈	Drama	FX on Hulu	11 November 2020; 12 February 2021	10 episodes	21–29 min	All markets	Miniseries
Big Sky	Crime thriller	ABC	18 November 2020	3 seasons, 47 episodes	42–44 min	All markets	Ended
Harrow	Medical drama	ABC TV	11 June 2021 (Note: Indonesia and Malaysia); 5 November 2021	3 seasons, 30 episodes	50–52 min	Southeast Asia	Ended
American Horror Stories ≈	Horror anthology	FX on Hulu	16 July 2021	3 seasons, 24 episodes	38–49 min	All markets	Pending
Y: The Last Man ≈	Post-apocalyptic science fiction	FX on Hulu	14 September 2021; 17 September 2021	1 season, 10 episodes	45–55 min	All markets	Ended
Love, Victor ≈	Romantic teen drama	Hulu	17 September 2021	3 seasons, 28 episodes	24–34 min	Thailand	Ended
The Premise ≈	Anthology series	FX on Hulu	17 September 2021; 17 December 2021	1 season, 5 episodes	30–32 min	All markets	Ended
The Big Leap	Musical comedy-drama	FOX	21 September 2021; 10 December 2021	1 season, 11 episodes	40–45 min	All markets	Ended
Our Kind of People	Drama	FOX	22 September 2021	1 season, 7 episodes	42–44 min	India	Ended
Grey's Anatomy	Medical drama	ABC	1 October 2021	21 seasons, 448 episodes	42–44 min	All markets	Renewed
Queens	Musical drama	ABC	20 October 2021	1 season, 8 episodes	42–44 min	India	Ended
Dopesick ≈	Drama	Hulu	12 November 2021	8 episodes	57–65 min	All markets	Miniseries
Holly Hobbie	Musical comedy drama	Hulu; Family Channel	7 January 2022	1 season, 10 episodes	23 min	Southeast Asia	Ended
Promised Land	Drama	ABC	25 January 2022; 29 April 2022	1 season, 10 episodes	42–44 min	All markets	Ended
Pam & Tommy ≈	Biographical drama	Hulu	3 February 2022; 18 March 2022	8 episodes	45–54 min	All markets	Miniseries
The Dropout ≈	Drama	Hulu	4 March 2022	8 episodes	45–54 min	All markets	Miniseries
Under the Banner of Heaven ≈	Crime drama	FX on Hulu	28 April 2022; 8 June 2022	7 episodes	64–65 min	All markets	Miniseries
Pistol ≈	Biographical drama	FX on Hulu	31 May 2022; 6 July 2022	6 episodes	45–56 min	All markets	Miniseries
The Old Man	Action thriller	FX	13 July 2022	2 seasons, 15 episodes	39–64 min	All markets	Ended
Candy ≈	True crime drama	Hulu	15 July 2022	5 episodes	48−55 min	All markets	Miniseries
Mike ≈	Biographical drama	Hulu	25 August 2022	8 episodes	21–33 min	India & Thailand	Miniseries
The Patient ≈	Psychological thriller	FX on Hulu	31 August 2022; 16 September 2022	10 episodes	21–46 min	All markets	Miniseries
Tell Me Lies ≈	Romantic drama	Hulu	8 September 2022; 9 September 2022	2 seasons, 18 episodes	45–53 min	All markets	Renewed
Reasonable Doubt ≈	Legal drama	Hulu	30 September 2022	2 seasons, 19 episodes	51–52 min	All markets	Renewed
Alaska Daily	Drama	ABC	7 October 2022; 10 March 2023	1 season, 10 episodes	42–44 min	All markets	Ended
Fleishman Is in Trouble ≈	Drama	FX on Hulu	17 November 2022; 2 December 2022	8 episodes	47–52 min	All markets	Miniseries
Welcome to Chippendales ≈	Biographical drama	Hulu	22 November 2022	8 episodes	35–46 min	All markets	Miniseries
Criminal Minds (seasons 16–18)	Crime drama	Paramount+	25 November 2022	3 seasons, 30 episodes	42–52 min	Southeast Asia	Renewed
Will Trent	Crime drama	ABC	4 January 2023; 1 March 2023	3 seasons, 41 episodes	42–44 min	All markets	Renewed
The Watchful Eye	Mystery thriller	Freeform	31 January 2023; 31 March 2023	1 season, 10 episodes	41–45 min	All markets	Ended
Kindred ≈	Science fiction drama	FX on Hulu	22 February 2023	1 season, 8 episodes	37–54 min	Southeast Asia	Ended
The Company You Keep	Drama	ABC	20 February 2023; 24 March 2023	1 season, 13 episodes	42–44 min	All markets	Ended
True Lies	Action drama	CBS	2 March 2023; 10 March 2023	1 season, 10 episodes	42–44 min	All markets	Ended
Tiny Beautiful Things ≈	Drama	Hulu	7 April 2023	8 episodes	26–32 min	All markets	Miniseries
The Clearing ≈	Psychological thriller	Disney+ (Star Hub)	24 May 2023	8 episodes	45–52 min	Southeast Asia	Miniseries
Saint X ≈	Psychological drama	Hulu	7 June 2023	8 episodes	42–53 min	India	Miniseries
Class of '09 ≈	Crime drama	FX on Hulu	21 June 2023	1 season, 8 episodes	37–48 min	India	Miniseries
Justified: City Primeval	Neo-Western crime drama	FX	19 July 2023	8 episodes	43–52 min.	India	Miniseries
Black Cake ≈	Historical drama	Hulu	3 November 2023; 14 February 2024	1 season, 8 episodes	54–61 min	All markets	Ended
Culprits ≈	Dark heist comedy thriller	Disney+ (Star Hub)	8 November 2023	8 episodes	48–58 min	All markets	Miniseries
A Murder at the End of the World ≈	Murder mystery	FX on Hulu	16 November 2023	7 episodes	42–72 min	All markets	Miniseries
Faraway Downs ≈	Historical drama	Disney+ (Star Hub)	28 November 2023; 31 January 2024	6 episodes	24–49 min	All markets	Miniseries
Death and Other Details ≈	Murder mystery	Hulu	17 January 2024	1 season, 10 episodes	40–52 min	All markets	Ended
Tracker	Action drama	CBS	10 February 2024	2 seasons, 33 episodes	42–44 min	All markets	Renewed
Shōgun ≈	Historical drama	FX on Hulu	27 February 2024	1 season, 10 episodes	53–70 min	All markets	Renewed
The Veil ≈	Thriller	FX on Hulu	30 April 2024	6 episodes	38–46 min	All markets	Miniseries
Shardlake ≈	Historical drama	Disney+ (Star Hub)	1 May 2024	1 season, 4 episodes	45–54 min	India	Ended
Under the Bridge ≈	True crime drama	Hulu	23 May 2024; 10 July 2024	8 episodes	46–47 min	All markets	Miniseries
Clipped ≈	Sports drama	FX on Hulu	4 June 2024; 6 June 2024	6 episodes	44–49 min	All markets	Miniseries
Queenie ≈	Drama	Channel 4; Hulu	7 June 2024	8 episodes	25–26 min	India	Miniseries
American Sports Story	Sports drama anthology	FX	18 September 2024	1 season, 10 episodes	38–59 min	India	Pending
Grotesquerie	Horror drama	FX	26 September 2024; 2 October 2024	1 season, 10 episodes	30–57 min	All markets	Pending
Doctor Odyssey	Medical drama	ABC	27 September 2024; 16 October 2024	1 season, 18 episodes	42 min	All markets	Ended
Rivals ≈	Drama	Disney+ (Star Hub)	18 October 2024	1 season, 8 episodes	48–61 min	India	Pending
Say Nothing ≈	Historical political drama	FX on Hulu	14 November 2024	9 episodes	40–49 min	All markets	Miniseries
Interior Chinatown ≈	Crime drama	Hulu	19 November 2024	10 episodes	35–47 min	All markets	Miniseries
High Potential	Crime procedural	ABC	23 January 2025; 1 April 2025	2 seasons, 14 episodes	42–44 min	All markets	Season 2 ongoing
Paradise ≈	Crime drama	Hulu	28 January 2025	1 season, 8 episodes	46–57 min	All markets	Renewed
Grosse Pointe Garden Society	Drama	NBC	24 February 2025	1 season, 13 episodes	42 min	India (Note: Available through Max in Southeast Asia.)	Ended
Suits LA	Drama	NBC	24 February 2025	1 season, 12 episodes	42–44 min	India	Ended
Good American Family ≈	True crime drama	Hulu	19 March 2025	8 episodes	46–52 min	All markets	Miniseries
Happy Face	True crime drama	Paramount+	21 March 2025	1 season, 8 episodes	48–58 min	India	Ended
MobLand	Crime drama	Paramount+	31 March 2025	1 season, 10 episodes	41–59 min	India	Pending
Washington Black ≈	Historical drama	Hulu	23 July 2025	8 episodes	32–57 min	All markets	Miniseries
Alien: Earth ≈	Science fiction horror	FX on Hulu	13 August 2025	1 season, 8 episodes	54–63 min	All markets	Pending
The Twisted Tale of Amanda Knox	True crime drama	Hulu	20 August 2025	8 episodes	48–55 min	All markets	Miniseries
Murdaugh: Death in the Family	True crime drama	Hulu	15 October 2025	8 episodes	50–54 min	India	Miniseries ongoing
All's Fair	Legal drama	Hulu	4 November 2025	1 season, 9 episodes	45 min	India	Season 1 ongoing

==== Comedy ====
Title	Genre	Original network	Premiere	Seasons	Runtime	Exclusive region(s)	Status
What We Do in the Shadows (Note: Season 1 previously aired on FX in Indonesia, Malaysia, Thailand, and Vietnam.)	Horror mockumentary	FX	28 March 2019; 3 September 2021	6 seasons, 61 episodes	22–30 min	All markets	Ended
It's Always Sunny in Philadelphia	Sitcom	FX (seasons 1–8); FXX (seasons 9–16)	19 February 2019	17 seasons, 178 episodes	18–43 min	India	Renewed 18
Love in the Time of Corona	Romantic comedy	Freeform	6 November 2020	4 episodes	27–35 min	Southeast Asia	Miniseries
Dollface ≈	Comedy	Hulu	29 January 2021	2 seasons, 20 episodes	22–32 min	Southeast Asia	Ended
Breeders	Comedy drama	FX; Sky One	9 July 2021; 16 July 2021	4 seasons, 40 episodes	21–31 min	Southeast Asia	Ended
Only Murders in the Building ≈	Crime comedy	Hulu	3 September 2021; 23 September 2021	5 seasons, 50 episodes	28–40 min	All markets	Season 5 ongoing
The Wonder Years	Coming-of-age comedy	ABC	23 September 2021; 29 April 2022	2 seasons, 32 episodes	21–22 min	All markets	Ended
Reservation Dogs ≈	Comedy	FX on Hulu	2 October 2021; 5 November 2021	3 seasons, 28 episodes	24–34 min	All markets	Ended
Abbott Elementary	Mockumentary sitcom	ABC	5 January 2022; 27 May 2022	4 seasons, 71 episodes	21–22 min	All markets	Renewed
How I Met Your Father ≈	Sitcom	Hulu	19 January 2022; 9 March 2022	2 seasons, 20 episodes	22–25 min	All markets	Ended
Single Drunk Female	Comedy	Freeform	21 January 2022; 8 April 2022	2 season, 20 episodes	20–25 min	All markets	Ended
Life & Beth ≈	Comedy drama	Hulu	28 March 2022; 3 June 2022	2 seasons, 20 episodes	24–32 min	All markets	Ended
Maggie ≈	Sitcom	Hulu	13 July 2022; 23 September 2022	1 season, 13 episodes	20–26 min	All markets	Ended
Everything's Trash	Comedy	Freeform	14 July 2022; 30 September 2022	1 season, 10 episodes	21–24 min	All markets	Ended
This Fool ≈	Comedy	Hulu	13 August 2022; 20 January 2023	2 seasons, 20 episodes	22–31 min	All markets	Ended
The Bear ≈	Comedy drama	FX on Hulu	17 August 2022; 19 August 2022	4 seasons, 38 episodes	20–66 min	All markets	Renewed
Wedding Season ≈	Romantic comedy thriller	Disney+ (Star Hub)	8 September 2022	1 season, 8 episodes	30–41 min	India & Thailand	Ended
The Villains of Valley View	Comedy	Disney Channel	16 September 2022	2 seasons, 37 episodes	24–25 min	Southeast Asia	Ended
Reboot ≈	Comedy	Hulu	21 September 2022; 18 November 2022	1 season, 8 episodes	29–30 min	All markets	Ended
Extraordinary ≈	Superhero comedy	Disney+ (Star Hub)	25 January 2023	2 seasons, 16 episodes	27–32 min	All markets	Ended
Not Dead Yet	Comedy	ABC	9 February 2023	2 seasons, 23 episodes	20–22 min	All markets	Ended
History of the World, Part II ≈	Sketch comedy	Hulu	8 March 2023	8 episodes	21–30 min	Southeast Asia	Miniseries
Unprisoned ≈	Comedy drama	Hulu	10 March 2023	2 seasons, 16 episodes	25–31 min	India	Ended
Up Here ≈	Romantic musical comedy	Hulu	31 March 2023	1 season, 8 episodes	24–31 min	All markets	Ended
Dave	Comedy	FXX	5 April 2023	3 seasons, 30 episodes	24–32 min	India	Ended
Saturdays	Coming-of-age comedy	Disney Channel	2 June 2023	1 season, 15 episodes	22–24 min	Southeast Asia	Ended
The Full Monty ≈	Comedy drama	Disney+ (Star Hub); FX on Hulu	16 June 2023	8 episodes	38–54 min	India	Miniseries
The Other Black Girl ≈	Dark comedy psychological thriller	Hulu	15 September 2023; 7 February 2024	1 season, 10 episodes	25–32 min	All markets	Ended
English Teacher	Comedy drama	FX	2 September 2024; 4 September 2024	1 season, 8 episodes	21–24 min	All markets	Renewed
How to Die Alone ≈	Comedy	Hulu	13 September 2024	1 season, 8 episodes	27–35 min	All markets	Ended
Last Days of the Space Age ≈	Comedy drama	Disney+ (Star Hub)	2 October 2024	8 episodes	32–46 min	All markets	Miniseries
Wizards Beyond Waverly Place	Teen sitcom	Disney Channel	30 October 2024	1 season, 21 episodes	22–27 min	All markets	Renewed
Small Town, Big Story	Black comedy	Sky Atlantic; Sky Max	27 February 2025	1 season, 6 episodes	40 min	India	Pending
Deli Boys ≈	Comedy	Hulu	6 March 2025	1 season, 10 episodes	21–27 min	All markets	Renewed
Mid-Century Modern ≈	Sitcom	Hulu	28 March 2025; 1 April 2025	1 season, 10 episodes	21–25 min	All markets	Ended
Georgie & Mandy's First Marriage	Sitcom	CBS	3 April 2025	1 season, 22 episodes	22 min	India	Renewed
Shifting Gears	Sitcom	ABC	7 May 2025	1 season, 10 episodes	22 min	Southeast Asia	Renewed
Adults	Comedy	FX	4 June 2025	1 season, 8 episodes	20–27 min	Southeast Asia	Pending
Electric Bloom	Musical comedy	Disney Channel	16 September 2025	1 season, 9 episodes	21–27 min	Southeast Asia	Pending
Chad Powers ≈	Sports comedy	Hulu	30 September 2025	1 season, 6 episodes	34–42 min	Southeast Asia	Season 1 ongoing (Note: In Indonesia, Malaysia, and Thailand, these series was originally premiered under Star content hub and released by Disney+ Hotstar in at the time of release, but later moved to either Disney+ or Disney+'s Hulu content hub after phase-out of Star, as well as rebranding of Disney+ HotStar to Disney+ in these regions.)

==== Animation ====
===== Adult animation =====
Title	Genre	Original network	Premiere	Seasons	Runtime	Exclusive region(s)	Status
Family Guy	Sitcom	Fox	18 May 2020	23 seasons, 444 episodes	21 min	All markets	Renewed for seasons 24–27
The Great North	Sitcom	FOX	4 January 2021; 19 November 2021	5 seasons, 82 episodes	21 min	All markets	Ended
M.O.D.O.K. ≈	Superhero science fiction comedy	Hulu	21 May 2021	1 season, 10 episodes	23–25 min	Southeast Asia	Ended
Solar Opposites ≈	Science fiction sitcom	Hulu	16 July 2021; 9 October 2025	5 seasons, 53 episodes	21–24 min	All markets	Renewed
Bob's Burgers	Sitcom	Fox	9 January 2022	15 seasons, 298 episodes	21 min	India	Renewed for seasons 16–19
Hit-Monkey ≈	Superhero action comedy	Hulu	26 January 2022	2 seasons, 20 episodes	22–28 min	All markets	Pending
Dicktown	Sitcom	FXX	4 March 2022	2 seasons, 20 episodes	10–11 min	India	Pending
Little Demon	Dark comedy sitcom	FXX	26 August 2022	1 season, 8 episodes	22–26 min	India	Ended
Koala Man ≈	Superhero comedy	Hulu	10 January 2023	1 season, 8 episodes	23–24 min	India	Ended
Praise Petey	Comedy	Freeform	22 July 2023; 27 September 2023	1 season, 10 episodes	20–21 min	All markets	Ended

===== Anime =====
Title	Genre	Original network	Premiere	Seasons	Runtime	Exclusive region(s)	Language	Status
Tatami Time Machine Blues ≈	Science fiction mystery comedy	Disney+ (Star Hub)	14 September 2022	6 episodes	17–32 min	All markets	Japanese	Miniseries
Phoenix: Eden17 ≈	Science fiction fantasy drama	Disney+ (Star Hub)	13 September 2023	4 episodes	18–29 min	All markets	Japanese	Miniseries
Sand Land ≈	Science fiction adventure comedy	Disney+ (Star Hub)	20 March 2024	1 season, 13 episodes	24 min	All markets	Japanese	Pending
Bullet/Bullet ≈	Fantasy action	Disney+ (Star Hub)	16 July 2025	12 episodes	25 min	Japanese	Southeast Asia	Miniseries
Cat's Eye ≈	Mystery crime drama	Disney+ (Star Hub)	26 September 2025	1 season, 12 episodes	23 min	Japanese	Southeast Asia	Season 1 ongoing

===== Kids & family =====
Title	Original network	Premiere	Seasons	Runtime	Exclusive region(s)	Status
Minnie's Bow-Toons	Disney Junior	21 July 2021	9 seasons, 105 episodes	22 min	Southeast Asia	Pending
Mickey Mouse Funhouse (Note: The special first episode was shown on Disney Junior in Indonesia, Thailand, and Vietnam on 30 September 2021, the final day of broadcast.)	Disney Junior	20 August 2021; 27 August 2021	3 seasons, 86 episodes	22 min	Southeast Asia	Pending
The Ghost and Molly McGee	Disney Channel	28 January 2022	2 seasons, 41 episodes	22 min	Southeast Asia	Ended
Alice's Wonderland Bakery	Disney Junior	1 July 2022	2 seasons, 50 episodes	22 min	Southeast Asia	Ended
How NOT to Draw	Disney Channel	30 September 2022	2 seasons, 14 episodes	1–2 min	Southeast Asia	Pending
Spidey and His Amazing Friends	Disney Junior	21 November 2022	4 seasons, 92 episodes	22 min	Southeast Asia	Season 4 ongoing Renewed for seasons 5–6
Firebuds	Disney Junior	2 December 2022	2 seasons, 48 episodes	24–25 min	Southeast Asia	Renewed
Hamster & Gretel	Disney Channel	17 February 2023	2 seasons, 50 episodes	22 min	Southeast Asia	Pending
Moon Girl and Devil Dinosaur	Disney Channel	28 April 2023	2 seasons, 41 episodes	22–44 min	Southeast Asia	Pending
Kiya & the Kimoja Heroes	Disney Junior	2 June 2023	1 season, 26 episodes	22 min	Southeast Asia	Ended
Chibiverse	Disney Channel	30 June 2023	3 seasons, 11 episodes	21 min	Southeast Asia	Pending
Eureka!	Disney Junior	12 July 2023	1 season, 30 episodes	23 min	Southeast Asia	Ended
Pupstruction	Disney Junior	6 September 2023	2 seasons, 50 episodes	22 min	Southeast Asia	Season 2 ongoing Renewed
SuperKitties	Disney Junior	13 September 2023	2 seasons, 50 episodes	22 min	Southeast Asia	Renewed for seasons 3–4
Hailey's On It!	Disney Channel	7 August 2024	1 season, 30 episodes	22 min	Southeast Asia	Ended
Zombies: The Re-Animated Series	Disney Channel	16 October 2024	1 season, 16 episodes	22 min	Southeast Asia	Pending
Ariel	Disney Junior	27 November 2024	1 season, 30 episodes	22 min	Southeast Asia	Season 1 ongoing Renewed
Kiff	Disney Channel	1 January 2025	2 seasons, 52 episodes	23 min	Southeast Asia	Renewed
Mickey Mouse Clubhouse+	Disney Junior	22 July 2025	1 season, 10 episodes	24 min	Southeast Asia	Season 1 ongoing Renewed for seasons 2–3
StuGo	Disney Channel	30 July 2025	1 season, 20 episodes	22 min	Southeast Asia	Pending
Iron Man and His Awesome Friends	Disney Junior	12 August 2025	1 season, 9 episodes	22 min	Southeast Asia	Season 1 ongoing

==== Unscripted ====
===== Docuseries =====
Title	Subject	Original network	Premiere	Seasons	Runtime	Exclusive region(s)	Status
A Wilderness of Error	True crime	FX	10 February 2021	5 episodes	40–61 min	India	Miniseries
The Most Dangerous Animal of All	True crime	FX	10 February 2021	4 episodes	40–46 min	India	Miniseries
Hip Hop Uncovered	Hip hop	FX	6 August 2021	6 episodes	53–60 min	Southeast Asia	Miniseries
McCartney 3,2,1 ≈	Music	Hulu	20 August 2021	6 episodes	27–31 min	Southeast Asia	Miniseries
Pride	LGBT rights	FX	10 September 2021	6 episodes	41–46 min	Thailand	Miniseries
Who Do You Believe?	True crime	ABC	3 May 2022; 28 October 2022	1 season, 8 episodes	40–42 min	All markets	Ended
Have You Seen this Man? ≈	Hulu	True crime	3 June 2022; 6 June 2022	3 episodes	40–42 min	All markets	Miniseries
Children of the Underground	True crime	FX	13 August 2022; 10 March 2023	5 episodes	44–52 min	All markets	Miniseries
Legacy: The True Story of the LA Lakers ≈	Sports	Hulu	16 August 2022; 28 October 2022	10 episodes	59–61 min	All markets	Miniseries
Welcome to Wrexham	Sports	FX	25 August 2022; 4 November 2022	4 seasons, 49 episodes	20–47 min	All markets	Renewed
Killing Country ≈	True crime	Hulu	3 February 2023	3 episodes	46–47 min	Southeast Asia	Miniseries
How I Caught My Killer ≈	True crime	Hulu	17 February 2023	9 episodes	42–51 min	Southeast Asia	Miniseries
Brawn: The Impossible Formula 1 Story ≈	Sports	Disney+ (Star Hub)	19 January 2024	4 episodes	57–61 min	India	Miniseries
Coleen Rooney: The Real Wagatha Story ≈	Scandal	Disney+ (Star Hub)	19 January 2023	3 episodes	45–49 min	India	Miniseries
Thank You, Goodnight: The Bon Jovi Story ≈	Music	Hulu	26 April 2024	4 episodes	60–94 min	All markets	Miniseries
Camden ≈	Music	Disney+ (Star Hub)	29 May 2024	4 episodes	43–52 min	India	Miniseries
Cult Massacre: One Day in Jonestown ≈	True crime	Hulu; National Geographic	17 June 2024	3 episodes	44 min	India	Miniseries
Mastermind: To Think Like a Killer ≈	True crime	Hulu	11 July 2024	3 episodes	40–44 min	India	Miniseries
In Vogue: The 1990s ≈	Fashion/Publishing	Disney+ (Star Hub)	13 September 2024; 19 February 2025	6 episodes	43–50 min	All markets	Miniseries
The Fox Hollow Murders: Playground of a Serial Killer ≈	True crime	Hulu	20 March 2025	4 episodes	48–55 min	India	Miniseries
Devil in the Family: The Fall of Ruby Franke ≈	True crime	Hulu	20 March 2025; 18 April 2025	3 episodes	50 min	All markets	Miniseries
Wicked Game: Devil in the Desert ≈	True crime	Hulu	20 March 2025	3 episodes	35–45 min	India	Miniseries
Call Her Alex ≈	Media	Hulu	10 June 2025	2 episodes	57–59 min	Southeast Asia	Miniseries
Diddy on Trial: As It Happened ≈	True crime	Hulu	11 June 2025	1 season, 6 episodes	28–39 min	Southeast Asia	Pending
Necaxa ≈	Sports	Disney+ (Star Hub); FXX	8 August 2025	1 season, 10 episodes	42–47 min	Southeast Asia	Pending

===== Reality =====
Title	Genre	Original network	Premiere	Seasons	Runtime	Exclusive region(s)	Status
The D'Amelio Show ≈	Reality	Hulu	19 November 2021; 11 August 2022	2 seasons, 18 episodes	25–34 min	All markets	Renewed
The Kardashians ≈	Reality	Hulu	14 April 2022	6 seasons, 60 episodes	39–56 min	All markets	Season 6 ongoing
Best in Dough ≈	Cooking competition	Hulu	23 September 2022	1 season, 10 episodes	33–34 min	Southeast Asia	Ended
Drag Me to Dinner ≈	Cooking competition	Hulu	30 June 2023	1 season, 10 episodes	35–43 min	Thailand	Pending
Vanderpump Villa ≈	Reality	Hulu	1 April 2024	1 season, 11 episodes	42–50 min	All markets	Renewed
Muslim Matchmaker ≈	Reality	Hulu	11 February 2025	1 season, 8 episodes	30–37 min	All markets	Pending
Got to Get Out ≈	Reality	Hulu	30 April 2025	1 season, 8 episodes	42 min	Southeast Asia	Pending

==== Continuations ====
Title	Genre	Original network	Premiere	Seasons	Runtime	Exclusive region(s)	Status
The Resident (season 4) (Note: Seasons 1–3 previously aired on Fox and Fox Life in Indonesia, Malaysia, Thailand, and Vietnam.)	Medical drama	FOX	20 August 2021	1 season, 14 episodes	43–45 min	Southeast Asia	Renewed
American Horror Story (seasons 10–12)	Horror anthology	FX	27 August 2021; 3 September 2021	3 seasons, 27 episodes	37–71 min	All markets	Renewed
The Walking Dead (season 11) (Note: Seasons 1–10 previously aired on Fox in Indonesia, Malaysia, Thailand, and Vietnam.)	Horror/Zombie apocalypse	AMC; FOX (Note: FOX handled worldwide excluding United States)	27 August 2021	1 season, 24 episodes	41–67 min	Southeast Asia	Ended
The Owl House (season 2) (Note: Season 1 previously aired on Disney Channel in Indonesia, Malaysia, Thailand, and Vietnam.)	Animated fantasy comedy-horror	Disney Channel	17 September 2021	1 season, 21 episodes	22 min	Southeast Asia	Ended
Amphibia (season 3) (Note: Seasons 1 and 2 previously aired on Disney Channel in Indonesia, Malaysia, Thailand, and Vietnam.)	Animated fantasy comedy	Disney Channel	7 January 2022	1 season, 18 episodes	22 min	Southeast Asia	Ended
Secrets of Sulphur Springs (seasons 2–3)	Mystery drama	Disney Channel	25 February 2022	2 seasons, 16 episodes	21–26 min	Southeast Asia	Ended
Big City Greens (seasons 3–4)	Animated adventure comedy	Disney Channel	10 June 2022	2 seasons, 50 episodes	22 min	Southeast Asia	Renewed
Raven's Home (seasons 5–6) (Note: Seasons 1–4 previously aired on Disney Channel in Indonesia, Malaysia, Thailand, and Vietnam.)	Family sitcom	Disney Channel	26 August 2022	2 seasons, 31 episodes	22–24 min	Southeast Asia	Ended
Bunk'd (seasons 6–7) (Note: Seasons 1–5 (seasons 1–4 in Malaysia) previously aired on Disney Channel in Indonesia, Malaysia, Thailand, and Vietnam.)	Comedy	Disney Channel	21 April 2023	2 seasons, 52 episodes	21–23 min	Southeast Asia	Pending
Futurama (seasons 11–13) ≈ (Note: For seasons 2–7, some episodes were aggregated into seasons 2–10 based on Disney+ Hotstar in Southeast Asia region reference. Therefore, season 8 of Futurama is designated as season 11 on this platform.)	Science fiction animated sitcom	Fox; Comedy Central; Hulu	26 July 2023; 6 October 2023	3 seasons, 30 episodes	26 min	All markets	Renewed
Phineas and Ferb (season 5)	Animated surreal comedy	Disney Channel	6 June 2025	1 season, 13 episodes	22 min	Southeast Asia	Renewed
King of the Hill (season 14) ≈	Animated sitcom	Fox (seasons 1–13); Hulu (season 14)	4 August 2025	1 season, 10 episodes	26–27 min	All markets	Pending

==== Specials ====
===== One-time =====
Title	Genre	Original network	Premiere	Runtime	Exclusive region(s)
The Queen Family Singalong	Music television	ABC	24 December 2021	41 min	Southeast Asia
A Very Boy Band Holiday	Music television	ABC	31 December 2021	42 min	Southeast Asia
ABC News Special: Alec Baldwin Unscripted	Documentary	ABC News	31 December 2021	47 min	Southeast Asia
The Year: 2021	Documentary	ABC News	12 January 2022	81 min	Southeast Asia

==== Non-English language ====
===== Dutch =====
Title	Genre	Original network	Premiere	Seasons	Runtime	Exclusive region(s)	Status
That One Word – Feyenoord ≈	Sports docuseries	Disney+ (Star Hub)	1 September 2021	1 season, 9 episodes	56–67 min	All markets	Ended
Nemesis ≈	Crime thriller	Disney+ (Star Hub)	16 October 2024	1 season, 8 episodes	40–55 min	India	Pending

===== French =====
Title	Genre	Original network	Premiere	Seasons	Runtime	Exclusive region(s)	Status
Oussekine ≈	Drama	Disney+ (Star Hub)	11 May 2022; 25 May 2022	4 episodes	53–63 min	All markets	Miniseries
Soprano: Sing or Die ≈	Music biography docuseries	Disney+ (Star Hub)	15 June 2022	1 season, 6 episodes	35 min	India	Ended
The French Mans ≈	Action comedy	Disney+ (Star Hub)	19 October 2022	2 seasons, 10 episodes	30 min	Southeast Asia	Ended
Becoming Karl Lagerfeld ≈	Biopic	Disney+ (Star Hub)	7 June 2024; 19 February 2025	6 episodes	38–49 min	All markets	Miniseries

===== Japanese =====
Title	Genre	Original network	Premiere	Seasons	Runtime	Exclusive region(s)	Status
Lost Man Found ≈	Comedy drama	Disney+ (Star Hub); NHK BS Premium	26 June 2022; 20 January 2023	10 episodes	48 min	All markets	Miniseries
Because We Forget Everything ≈	Mystery comedy drama	Disney+ (Star Hub)	14 September 2022; 3 February 2023	10 episodes	26–37 min	All markets	Miniseries
Gannibal ≈	Horror thriller	Disney+ (Star Hub)	28 December 2022	2 seasons, 13 episodes	33–59 min	All markets	Season 2 ongoing
A Town Without Seasons ≈	Drama	Disney+ (Star Hub)	9 August 2023	10 episodes	25–28 min	All markets	Miniseries
Dragons of Wonderhatch ≈	Anime/Live-action hybrid	Disney+ (Star Hub)	20 December 2023	8 episodes	33–46 min	All markets	Miniseries
House of the Owl ≈	Political drama	Disney+ (Star Hub)	24 April 2024	10 episodes	34–50 min	All markets	Miniseries
Land of Tanabata ≈	Science fiction	Disney+ (Star Hub)	4 July 2024	1 season, 10 episodes	44–61 min	Southeast Asia	Miniseries

===== Korean =====
Title	Genre	Original network	Premiere	Seasons	Runtime	Exclusive region(s)	Status
Outrun by Running Man ≈	Variety show	Disney+ (Star Hub)	12 November 2021	1 season, 14 episodes	9–56 min	Southeast Asia	Pending
Rookie Cops ≈	Coming-of-age police procedural comedy drama	Disney+ (Star Hub)	26 January 2022; 12 October 2022	16 episodes	54–63 min	All markets	Miniseries
Grid ≈	Mystery techno-thriller	Disney+ (Star Hub)	16 February 2022; 7 September 2022	10 episodes	50–55 min	All markets	Miniseries
Soundtrack #1 ≈	Musical/romantic drama	Disney+ (Star Hub)	23 March 2022; 27 April 2022	4 episodes	39–53 min	All markets	Miniseries
Kiss Sixth Sense ≈	Romantic fantasy drama	Disney+ (Star Hub)	25 May 2022	12 episodes	60–75 min	All markets	Miniseries
The Zone: Survival Mission ≈	Reality competition	Disney+ (Star Hub)	8 September 2022	3 seasons, 24 episodes	54–73 min	All markets	Pending
May It Please the Court ≈	Legal comedy drama	Disney+ (Star Hub)	21 September 2022	12 episodes	64–66 min	All markets	Miniseries
Pink Lie ≈	Dating show	Disney+ (Star Hub)	5 October 2022	1 season, 12 episodes	72–115 min	All markets	Miniseries
Shadow Detective ≈	Crime thriller	Disney+ (Star Hub)	26 October 2022	2 seasons, 16 episodes	55–57 min	All markets	Ended
Revenge of Others ≈	Mystery thriller	Disney+ (Star Hub)	9 November 2022	12 episodes	58–63 min	All markets	Miniseries
Connect ≈	Psychological fantasy crime thriller	Disney+ (Star Hub)	7 December 2022	6 episodes	36–46 min	All markets	Miniseries
Big Bet ≈	Drama	Disney+ (Star Hub)	21 December 2022	2 seasons, 16 episodes	49–58 min	All markets	Ended
Super Junior: The Last Man Standing ≈	Music docuseries	Disney+ (Star Hub)	18 January 2023	2 episodes	49–50 min	All markets	Miniseries
Call It Love ≈	Romantic melodrama	Disney+ (Star Hub)	22 February 2023	16 episodes	71–73 min	All markets	Miniseries
RACE ≈	Workplace drama	Disney+ (Star Hub)	10 May 2023	12 episodes	53–63 min	All markets	Miniseries
Full Count ≈	Sports docuseries	Disney+ (Star Hub)	14 June 2023	10 episodes	41–66 min	All markets	Miniseries
Moving ≈	Action thriller	Disney+ (Star Hub)	9 August 2023	20 episodes	38–58 min	All markets	Miniseries
NCT 127: The Lost Boys ≈	Music docuseries	Disney+ (Star Hub)	30 August 2023	4 episodes	34–38 min	All markets	Miniseries
Han River Police ≈	Action comedy	Disney+ (Star Hub)	13 September 2023	6 episodes	47–53 min	All markets	Miniseries
The Worst of Evil ≈	Crime drama	Disney+ (Star Hub)	27 September 2023	12 episodes	52–69 min	All markets	Miniseries
Vigilante ≈	Action thriller	Disney+ (Star Hub)	9 November 2023	8 episodes	42–54 min	All markets	Miniseries
Soundtrack #2 ≈	Musical romantic drama	Disney+ (Star Hub)	6 December 2023	6 episodes	41–46 min	Southeast Asia	Miniseries
A Shop for Killers ≈	Action drama	Disney+ (Star Hub)	17 January 2024	1 season, 8 episodes	44–62 min	All markets	Renewed
The Impossible Heir ≈	Revenge drama	Disney+ (Star Hub)	28 February 2024	12 episodes	51–65 min	All markets	Miniseries
Blood Free ≈	Mystery thriller	Disney+ (Star Hub)	10 April 2024	10 episodes	46–50 min	All markets	Miniseries
Uncle Samsik ≈	Historical drama	Disney+ (Star Hub)	15 May 2024	16 episodes	44–46 min	All markets	Miniseries
Red Swan ≈	Drama	Disney+ (Star Hub)	3 July 2024	10 episodes	49–57 min	Southeast Asia	Miniseries
The Tyrant ≈	Action thriller	Disney+ (Star Hub)	14 August 2024	4 episodes	37–51 min	All markets	Miniseries
Seoul Busters ≈	Crime comedy	Disney+ (Star Hub)	11 September 2024	20 episodes	41–58 min	All markets	Miniseries
Gangnam B-Side ≈	Crime drama	Disney+ (Star Hub)	6 November 2024	8 episodes	42–49 min	All markets	Miniseries
Light Shop ≈	Mystery drama	Disney+ (Star Hub)	4 December 2024	8 episodes	39–43 min	All markets	Miniseries
Unmasked ≈	Office humor action thriller	Disney+ (Star Hub)	15 January 2025	12 episodes	55–66 min	All markets	Miniseries
Hyper Knife ≈	Medical thriller	Disney+ (Star Hub)	19 March 2025	8 episodes	58–67 min	Southeast Asia	Miniseries
Nine Puzzles ≈	Crime thriller	Disney+ (Star Hub)	21 May 2025	11 episodes	49–62 min	Southeast Asia	Miniseries
Low Life ≈	Historical drama	Disney+ (Star Hub)	16 July 2025	11 episodes	54–56 min	Southeast Asia	Miniseries
Anchovy Physical Camp ≈	Variety show	Disney+ (Star Hub)	22 August 2025	1 season, 7 episodes	TBA	Southeast Asia	Season 1 ongoing
60 Minutes to Love ≈	Dating reality show	Disney+ (Star Hub)	23 August 2025	1 season, 7 episodes	TBA	Southeast Asia	Season 1 ongoing
Belly Showdown ≈	Variety show	Disney+ (Star Hub)	24 August 2025	1 season, 7 episodes	TBA	Southeast Asia	Season 1 ongoing
YOO Got a Minute? ≈	Variety/Talk show	Disney+ (Star Hub)	25 August 2025	1 season, 7 episodes	TBA	Southeast Asia	Season 1 ongoing
Chef's Go-To ≈	Reality show	Disney+ (Star Hub)	26 August 2025	1 season, 7 episodes	TBA	Southeast Asia	Season 1 ongoing
Tempest ≈	Political thriller	Disney+ (Star Hub)	10 September 2025	9 episodes	45–76 min	Southeast Asia	Miniseries
The Murky Stream ≈	Historical drama	Disney+ (Star Hub)	26 September 2025	9 episodes	47–60 min	Southeast Asia	Miniseries ongoing

===== Mandarin =====
Title	Genre	Original network	Premiere	Seasons	Runtime	Exclusive region(s)	Status
Extreme Forest	Travel docu-reality	National Geographic; LINE TV	14 May 2022	1 season, 12 episodes	50 min	Southeast Asia	Ended (Note: Moved to Discovery Asia for season 2)
Small & Mighty ≈	Legal comedy drama	Disney+ (Star Hub); Bilibili	15 June 2022	26 episodes	37–43 min	Southeast Asia	Miniseries
Women in Taipei ≈	Slice-of-life melodrama	Disney+ (Star Hub)	21 September 2022	11 episodes	44–53 min	Southeast Asia	Miniseries
Taiwan Crime Stories ≈	Crime psychological thriller	Disney+ (Star Hub)	4 January 2023	1 season, 12 episodes	43–61 min	Southeast Asia	Ended

===== Portuguese =====
Title	Genre	Original network	Premiere	Seasons	Runtime	Exclusive region(s)	Status
Insanity ≈	Horror/Psychological thriller	Star+	26 January 2022	1 season, 8 episodes	32–38 min	All markets	Ended
Time Switch ≈	Fantasy drama	Star+	10 May 2023	1 season, 8 episodes	32–39 min	Thailand	Pending

===== Spanish =====
Title	Genre	Original network	Premiere	Seasons	Runtime	Exclusive region(s)	Status
Galácticos	Sports docuseries	ESPN+	24 December 2021	3 episodes	27–28 min	Southeast Asia	Miniseries
Alternative Therapy ≈	Comedy	Star+	14 March 2022	2 seasons, 17 episodes	31–44 min	India	Pending
Not My Fault: Mexico ≈	Drama	Star+	23 March 2022	10 episodes	38–47 min	India	Miniseries
The Heartthrob: TV Changed, He Didn't ≈	Comedy	Star+	8 June 2022	1 season, 12 episodes	28–39 min	India	Ended
Santa Evita ≈	Period drama biopic	Star+	26 July 2022; 26 August 2022	7 episodes	36–47 min	All markets	Miniseries
Repatriated ≈	Drama	Star+	21 September 2022	1 season, 10 episodes	33–45 min	All markets	Ended
The Stolen Cup ≈	Comedy drama	Star+	9 November 2022	1 season, 6 episodes	25–33 min	All markets	Ended
Our Only Chance ≈	Musical drama	Disney+ (Star Hub)	14 November 2022	5 episodes	47–58 min	All markets	Miniseries
Prime Time ≈	Crime thriller	Star+	15 February 2023	10 episodes	34–44 min	All markets	Miniseries
Planners ≈	Comedy drama	Star+	5 May 2023	1 season, 9 episodes	30–41 min	Southeast Asia	Pending
Cristóbal Balenciaga ≈	Biopic	Disney+ (Star Hub)	19 January 2024; 29 January 2025	6 episodes	50 min	All markets	Miniseries
UFO Factory ≈	Science fiction comedy	Star+	3 April 2024	1 season, 10 episodes	21–27 min	India	Pending
See You in Another Life ≈	Crime thriller	Disney+ (Star Hub)	17 April 2024	6 episodes	32–44 min	India	Miniseries
Lucrecia: A Murder in Madrid ≈	True crime docuseries	Disney+ (Star Hub)	27 June 2024	4 episodes	32–36 min	India	Miniseries
The Chavez ≈	Reality	Disney+ (Star Hub)	11 September 2024	1 season, 6 episodes	28–38 min	India	Pending
Mama Cake ≈	Comedy	Disney+ (Star Hub)	25 September 2024	1 season, 10 episodes	27–33 min	India	Pending
La Máquina ≈	Sports drama	Hulu	9 October 2024	6 episodes	29–53 min	All markets	Miniseries
Return to Las Sabinas ≈	Telenovela	Disney+ (Star Hub)	11 October 2024	70 episodes	38–55 min	India	Ended

===== Other =====
Title	Genre	Original network	Premiere	Seasons	Runtime	Language	Exclusive region(s)	Status
The Ignorant Angels ≈	Romantic drama	Disney+ (Star Hub)	13 April 2022	8 episodes	41–60 min	Italian	Thailand	Miniseries
Pauline ≈	Supernatural coming-of-age drama	Disney+ (Star Hub)	22 May 2024	6 episodes	37–43 min	German	India	Miniseries

=== Exclusive third-party distribution ===
==== Drama ====
Title	Genre	Original network	Premiere	Seasons	Runtime	Language	Exclusive region(s)
The Deer and the Cauldron	Period drama	CCTV-8 (China); Star Chinese Channel (Southeast Asia)	12 February 2021	45 episodes	45 min	Mandarin	Southeast Asia
24 Japan	Action thriller	TV Asahi; Abema; TELASA	30 June 2021; 2 July 2021	24 episodes	60 min	Japanese	Southeast Asia
Things You Know by Watching Them	Drama	WOWOW	30 June 2021	8 episodes	48–53 min	Japanese	Malaysia & Thailand
A Day-Off of Kasumi Arimura	Slice of life drama	WOWOW	30 June 2021; 16 July 2021	8 episodes	24–41 min	Japanese	Malaysia & Thailand
The Sun Stands Still – The Eclipse	Conspiracy thriller	WOWOW	30 June 2021; 2 July 2021	6 episodes	43–47 min	Japanese	Malaysia & Thailand
Tokyo MER: Mobile Emergency Room	Medical drama	TBS	27 October 2021	11 episodes	46–60 min	Japanese	Southeast Asia
Snowdrop ≈	Romantic dark comedy	JTBC	18 December 2021; 9 February 2022	16 episodes	74–100 min	Korean	All markets
Anita (Director's Cut)	Musical/Biopic	Theatrical release	2 February 2022	5 episodes	45 min	Cantonese	Southeast Asia
Crazy Love ≈	Romantic dark comedy	KBS2	7 March 2022; 30 November 2022	16 episodes	62–69 min	Korean	All markets
Delicacies Destiny ≈	Period romantic comedy	Bilibili	7 April 2022	1 season, 16 episodes	24–48 min	Mandarin	Southeast Asia
Going to You at a Speed of 493 km (Love All Play)	Romantic sports drama	KBS2	20 April 2022; 27 January 2023	16 episodes	62–70 min	Korean	All markets
Bloody Heart	Romantic period drama	KBS2	2 May 2022; 13 January 2023	16 episodes	64–71 min	Korean	All markets
Tomorrow, I'll Be Someone's Girlfriend ≈	Romantic drama	MBS/TBS	4 May 2022; 7 December 2022	2 season, 21 episodes	24 min	Japanese	All markets
My Family ≈	Suspense family drama	TBS	11 May 2022; 14 December 2022	10 episodes	54 min	Japanese	All markets
The Files of Young Kindaichi ≈	Mystery/suspense drama	Nippon TV	18 May 2022; 6 January 2023	1 season, 10 episodes	46–69 min	Japanese	All markets
Doctor Lawyer	Medical-legal drama	MBC	3 June 2022	16 episodes	60–69 min	Korean	All markets
Link: Eat, Love, Kill ≈	Romantic fantasy comedy drama	tvN	6 June 2022	16 episodes	60–72 min	Korean	All markets
Adamas ≈	Fantasy crime drama	tvN	27 July 2022	16 episodes	62–77 min	Korean	All markets
Big Mouth ≈	Noir thriller	MBC	29 July 2022	16 episodes	60–72 min	Korean	All markets
The Golden Spoon ≈	Fantasy drama	MBC	23 September 2022	16 episodes	68–80 min	Korean	All markets
One Dollar Lawyer ≈	Legal comedy drama	SBS TV	23 September 2022	12 episodes	58–74 min	Korean	All markets
Atom's Last Shot ≈	Video game industry drama	TBS	26 October 2022; 21 December 2022	9 episodes	45–69 min	Japanese	All markets
Yakuza Lover ≈	Romantic drama	MBS	2 November 2022; 28 December 2022	10 episodes	24 min	Japanese	All markets
The First Responders ≈	Action thriller	SBS TV	12 November 2022	2 seasons, 24 episodes	59–70 min	Korean	All markets
Pandora: Beneath the Paradise ≈	Revenge drama	tvN	11 March 2023	16 episodes	62–66 min	Korean	All markets
Family: The Unbreakable Bond ≈	Spy comedy drama	tvN	5 May 2023; 23 May 2023	12 episodes	66–79 min	Korean	All markets
Revenant ≈	Mystery horror thriller	SBS TV	23 June 2023	12 episodes	57–77 min	Korean	All markets
My Home Hero ≈	Suspense crime drama	MBS/TBS	25 October 2023	10 episodes	23–24 min	Japanese	All markets
Tell Me That You Love Me ≈	Romantic drama	Genie TV (ENA)	27 November 2023	16 episodes	60 min	Korean	All markets
Maestra: Strings of Truth ≈	Music melodrama	tvN	9 December 2023	12 episodes	55–75 min	Korean	All markets
Flex X Cop ≈	Crime drama	SBS TV	26 January 2024	1 season, 16 episodes	60–65 min	Korean	Southeast Asia
Wonderful World ≈	Mystery revenge drama	MBC TV	1 March 2024	14 episodes	63–73 min	Korean	Southeast Asia
Chief Detective 1958 ≈	Historical crime action	MBC TV	19 April 2024	10 episodes	65–74 min	Korean	All markets
Crash ≈	Crime comedy	Genie TV (ENA)	13 May 2024	12 episodes	60–63 min	Korean	All markets
No Way Out: The Roulette ≈	Mystery thriller	U+ Mobile TV	31 July 2024	8 episodes	54–61 min	Korean	Southeast Asia
The Judge from Hell ≈	Dark fantasy legal thriller	SBS TV	21 September 2024	1 season, 14 episodes	60–74 min	Korean	Southeast Asia
Jeongnyeon: The Star Is Born	Coming-of-age period drama	tvN	12 October 2024	16 episodes	61–75 min	Korean	All markets
Love Your Enemy	Romantic comedy	tvN	23 November 2024	12 episodes	70 min	Korean	Southeast Asia
Buried Hearts	Revenge drama	SBS TV	21 February 2025	16 episodes	61–75 min	Korean	Southeast Asia
Suspicious Partner	Romantic crime comedy	JNN (MBS/TBS)	31 May 2025	12 episodes	23–24 min	Japanese	Southeast Asia
Our Movie	Melodrama	SBS TV	13 June 2025	12 episodes	66–72 min	Korean	Southeast Asia
Law and the City	Legal drama	tvN	5 July 2025	12 episodes	61–81 min	Korean	Southeast Asia (Note: Shared with pay TV licensor tvN Asia)
The Nice Guy	Romantic drama	JTBC	18 July 2025	14 episodes	60–62 min	Korean	Southeast Asia
Twelve	Fantasy action superhero	KBS2	23 August 2025	8 episodes	49–51 min	Korean	Southeast Asia

==== Anime ====
Title	Genre	Original network	Premiere	Seasons	Runtime	Language	Exclusive region(s)	Status
Platinum End	Supernatural thriller	TBS, BS11, RKK, KBC, TUF, CBC, HBC, tbc, IBC	5 January 2022; 8 September 2022	24 episodes	24 min	Japanese	All markets (Note: Licensed exclusively for Star in some Asian territories by Medialink)	Miniseries
Black Rock Shooter: Dawn Fall ≈	Action science fantasy	Tokyo MX, BS11, KBS Kyoto, SUN, TV Aichi	27 April 2022; 8 September 2022	12 episodes	24 min	Japanese	All markets	Miniseries
Aoashi ≈	Coming-of-age sports drama	NHK E	4 May 2022; 28 September 2022	1 season, 24 episodes	24 min	Japanese	All markets	Pending
Summer Time Rendering ≈	Supernatural suspense mystery	Tokyo MX, BS11, Kansai TV, KBC	4 May 2022; 19 October 2022	25 episodes	24 min	Japanese	All markets	Miniseries
Dance Dance Danseur	Coming-of-age drama	JNN (MBS, TBS), BS Asahi, AT-X	13 May 2022; 8 September 2022	11 episodes	24 min	Japanese	All markets	Miniseries
Tomodachi Game	Psychological thriller	Nippon TV, BS Nittele, KKT, AT-X	13 May 2022; 8 September 2022	12 episodes	24 min	Japanese	All markets	Miniseries
Tengoku Daimakyō (Heavenly Delusion) ≈	Science fiction mystery adventure	Tokyo MX, BS11, HTB, RKB, TV Aichi, MBS	1 April 2023	1 season, 13 episodes	24 min	Japanese	All markets	Pending
Synduality: Noir ≈	Science fiction action-adventure	TXN (TV Tokyo), BS Nittele, AT-X	10 July 2023	1 season, 24 episodes	24 min	Japanese	All markets	Pending
Undead Unluck	Supernatural action-adventure comedy	JNN (MBS, TBS)	13 December 2023	1 season, 24 episodes	24 min	Japanese	All markets	Pending
Ishura ≈	Fantasy action-adventure	Tokyo MX, BS Nittele, KBS Kyoto, SUN, Mētele, AT-X	3 January 2024	2 seasons, 24 episodes	23 min	Japanese	All markets	Pending
The Fable ≈	Crime thriller	NNS (Nippon TV, BS Nittele)	7 April 2024	1 season, 25 episodes	23 min	Japanese	All markets	Pending
Go! Go! Loser Ranger! ≈	Tokusatsu black comedy	JNN (TBS), BS11, AT-X	7 April 2024	2 seasons, 24 episodes	23 min	Japanese	All markets	Pending
Code Geass: Rozé of the Recapture ≈	Mecha military fiction	Theatrical release	21 June 2024	12 episodes	24 min	Japanese	All markets	Miniseries
Murai in Love	Romantic comedy	Tokyo MX, BS Nittele, BBC Biwako	4 September 2024	1 season, 12 episodes	23 min	Japanese	All markets	Pending
Medalist	Sports drama	ANN (TV Asahi, CS Asahi 1, BS Asahi)	5 January 2025	1 season, 13 episodes	23 min	Japanese	Southeast Asia	Renewed
Wandance	Coming-of-age	ANN (TV Asahi), AT-X, BS Asahi	8 October 2025	TBA	TBA	Japanese	Southeast Asia	Season 1 ongoing

==== Sports ====
Event	Broadcast partner(s)	Dates	Exclusive region(s)	Notes
WWE Premium Live Events	Peacock (United States); WWE Network (Worldwide excluding United States, Canada, MENA, South Africa, Australia & India)	2022–2024	Indonesia	Every event streamed live and on demand, including WrestleMania and SummerSlam. Shared with Disney+ Philippines.

==== Unscripted ====
Title	Genre	Original network	Premiere	Seasons	Runtime	Language	Exclusive region(s)	Status
Total Bellas	Reality show	E! (via WWE Network)	6 May 2022	6 seasons, 54 episodes	41–43 min	English	Indonesia	Ended
MotoGP: Unlimited	Sports docuseries	Amazon Prime Video	28 September 2022	1 season, 8 episodes	50 min	English	Southeast Asia (Note: Shared with SPOTV, of which the latter carried the live coverage of the MotoGP races from the previously defunct Fox Sports Asia.)	Renewed
My Name Is Gabriel	Reality show	JTBC	11 June 2024	1 season, 8 episodes	97–118 min	Korean	Southeast Asia	Pending

==== Continuations ====
Title	Genre	Original network	Premiere	Seasons	Runtime	Language	Exclusive region(s)	Status
The Voice (seasons 21–24) (Note: Previously aired on AXN for seasons 1–10 and on Fox Life for seasons 11–20 in Indonesia, Malaysia, Thailand, and Vietnam.)	Reality competition	NBC	10 December 2021	4 seasons, 97 episodes	44–104 min	English	Southeast Asia	Ended (Note: Moved to Netflix, starting from season 25.)
Bluey (season 3) (Note: Previously aired on Disney Junior for seasons 1–2 in Indonesia, Malaysia, Thailand, and Vietnam.)	Preschool animated comedy	ABC Kids	10 August 2022; 21 October 2022	1 season, 52 episodes	7 min	English	All markets (Note: Shared with pay TV licensor CBeebies Asia)	Pending
NCIS (seasons 19–21) (Note: Some past seasons previously aired on Fox in Indonesia, Malaysia, Thailand, and Vietnam.)	Police procedural	CBS	4 September 2022	3 seasons, 53 episodes	43–45 min	English	Southeast Asia (Note: Shared with pay TV licensor Rock Entertainment.)	Renewed
Tokyo Revengers (season 2) (Note: Both the Christmas Showdown and Tenjiku arcs are listed together as season 2 on the Hotstar service.) ≈	Fantasy action anime	MBS, TV Tokyo, TV Aichi, TVh, TVQ, BS Asahi, AT-X, TSK, QAB, RKK, Aomori TV, UTY, RSK	8 January 2023	1 seasons, 26 episodes	24 min	Japanese	All markets (Note: Previously owned by Muse Communication, which carried the first season.)	Renewed
Dr. Romantic (season 3) (Note: Previously streamed on Viu for seasons 1–2 in Indonesia, Malaysia and Thailand) ≈	Medical drama	SBS TV	28 April 2023	1 season, 16 episodes	70 min	Korean	All markets	Pending
Miraculous: Tales of Ladybug & Cat Noir (season 5) (Note: Previously aired on Disney Channel for seasons 1–4 in Indonesia, Malaysia, Thailand, and Vietnam.)	Coming-of-age superhero animation	TF1 (TFOU)	9 June 2023	1 season, 27 episodes	22 min	French	Southeast Asia	Season 5 ongoing
Arthdal Chronicles: The Sword of Aramoon (season 2)	Historical fantasy	tvN	16 September 2023	1 season, 12 episodes	72–78 min	Korean	Southeast Asia	Pending
Unexpected Business (season 3) (Note: Previously aired on tvN Asia for seasons 1–2 in Indonesia, Malaysia and Thailand)	Reality show	tvN	26 October 2023	1 season, 14 episodes	TBA	Korean	All markets	Pending
The Fiery Priest (season 2) (Note: Previously aired on Viu for season 1 in Indonesia, Malaysia and Thailand)	Crime drama	SBS TV	8 November 2024	1 season, 12 episodes	65–88 min	Korean	All markets	Pending

==== Former exclusive third-party distribution ====
The following shows that previously streamed on the platform but were not originally commissioned by Hotstar.

Title	Genre	Original network	Date Premiered	Language	Exclusive region(s)
Confess	Romantic drama	go90	23 December 2017	English	India
Freakish	Teen horror	Hulu	23 December 2017	English	India
T@gged	Teen psychological thriller	go90; Hulu	23 December 2017	English	India
Patrick Melrose	Black comedy miniseries	Showtime; Sky Atlantic	13 May 2018	English	India
Mata Hari	Biographical drama	Channel One; Inter	27 July 2018	Russian; English	India
The Amazing Race Australia (season 5)	Reality competition	Network 10	14 May 2021	English	Southeast Asia

=== Star on Disney+ Hotstar ===
In May 2023, the Star hub from Disney+ was made available for Disney+ Hotstar in Southeast Asia, specifically Indonesia, Malaysia, and Thailand. The hub is rebranding to Hulu on October 8, 2025 with rebranding from Disney+ Hotstar to Disney+ on these regions.

== Upcoming original programming ==
=== Indian original programming ===
==== Hotstar Specials ====
===== Drama =====
Title	Genre	Premiere	Seasons	Language(s)	Status
Anali	Crime drama	2026	TBA	Malayalam	Post-production
Maharana	Period drama	TBA	TBA	Hindi	Filming
Ishq From Ponnani	Family drama	TBA	TBA	Malayalam	Filming
Mahabharat	Epic drama	TBA	TBA	Hindi	Series order

===== Horror =====
Title	Genre	Premiere	Seasons	Language(s)	Status
Adbhut	Horror thriller	2025	TBA	Hindi	Filming

== Upcoming exclusive distribution ==
 Note:
Shows that labelled with ≈ imply the shows that
- originally came from Hulu Originals on the original network Hulu and its content hub on Disney+ in International markets, rebranded then as Hotstar Originals within the platform for the served regions and markets.
- being bought by Disney for distribution rights and rebranded then as Hotstar Originals within the platform for the served regions and markets.

=== Exclusive international distribution ===
==== Drama ====
Title	Genre	Original network	Premiere	Seasons	Runtime	Language	Exclusive region(s)	Status
We Were the Lucky Ones ≈	Historical drama	Hulu	TBA	8 episodes	50–56 min	English	India	Awaiting release
