= Exposition =

Exposition (also the French for exhibition) may refer to:

- Universal exposition or World's Fair
- Expository writing
- Exposition (narrative), background information in a story
- Exposition (music)
- Trade fair
- Exposition (album), the debut album by the band Wax on Radio
- Expository preaching

== See also ==
- Expo (disambiguation)
- Expose (disambiguation)
- Expos
