= Time exposure =

Time exposure may refer to:

- Long-exposure photography or time-exposure photography
- Time Exposure (Stanley Clarke album), 1984
- Time Exposure (Little River Band album), 1981
- Time Exposure the 1940 autobiography of US photographer William Henry Jackson (1843-1942)

== See also ==
- Exposure (disambiguation)
