= Wax on Radio =

- Origin: Chicago, Illinois, USA
- Genres: Alternative rock
- Years active: 2004–2009
- Labels: Downtown Records
- Members: Mikey Russell; Bob Buckstaff; Dustin Chabert; Sammy Del Real; Luke Dent

Wax on Radio was an American alternative rock band from Chicago, Illinois. Wax on Radio was created in 2004 when singer Mikey Russell, bassist Harrison Taylor, guitarist Bob Buckstaff, keyboardist Scott Heatherly, and drummer Sammy Del Real met in the tiny suburban Chicago music scene, in and around the towns of Schaumburg and Lake Forest. The fivesome, came together through the recommendations of mutual friends, when Russell put out the word that he was looking to start a new band.

== Career ==
Wax on Radio was signed to Downtown Records in 2006. Later that year, they released their debut album, Exposition. In early 2007, they toured nationwide in the US opening for Forgive Durden and Brazil, following these dates with two months of touring nationwide, opening for The Ataris. The group received positive reviews from SPIN for their track "Today I Became A Realist" and from Rolling Stone for their live performances.

Wax On Radio was signed by Downtown Records in 2007, but was less than satisfied with the terms of their contract. That led to a break-up of the band until the contract expired. The band's Internet postings say that they have over forty new songs ready to be record, and ten will be released on their next album, which has yet to be named. The band has also added Luke Dent from The Dear Hunter (TDH) as a keyboardist. All four members of Wax on Radio are either vegetarian or vegan.

Wax on Radio disbanded in October 2008, due to musical differences. Many members of the band have moved on to other projects. Mikey Russell started the band Suns, who played their first show at the Metro in Chicago in January 2010. Luke Dent moved on to create the band Meadowlarks.

== Discography ==
- Exposition (EP)
- Exposition (full-length, 2006)

== Members ==
- Mikey Russell - Vocals, Guitar
- Bob Buckstaff - Guitar, Wurlitzer, Tambourine
- Dustin Chabert - Bass Guitar, Bells
- Sammy Del Real - Drums, Percussion
- Luke Dent - Keyboards

== Former members ==
- Harrison Taylor - Bass Guitar, Bells (2004-2007)
- Scott Heatherly - Keyboards (2004-2005)
