= Roar of the Lion =

2019 Indian web series

- Release Poster
- Genre: Docuseries
- Written by: Amardeep Galsin
- Directed by: Amir Rizvi
- Creative director: Khuzema Haveliwala
- Composers: Gaurav Godkindhi; Vishal J. Singh
- Country of origin: India
- Original language: English
- No. of seasons: 1
- No. of episodes: 5

Production
- Executive producers: Kabir Khan; Jigar Thakkar
- Cinematography: Nikhil Tandon
- Editors: Pradeep Singh Negi; Vinod Salhotra
- Production companies: Dhoni Entertainment; Banijay Asia

Original release
- Network: Hotstar
- Release: 20 March 2019

Roar of the Lion is a 2019 Indian English-language documentary television series for Hotstar, co-produced by Kabir Khan, written by Amardeep Galsin and directed by Amir Rizvi, starring MS Dhoni, Ravindra Jadeja, Suresh Raina, Shane Watson, Dwayne Bravo with Faf du Plessis, Deepak Chahar and Ambati Rayudu as supporting cast. The series follows the Indian Premier League team Chennai Super Kings, who returned to the 2018 edition of the IPL after serving a two-year ban for allegedly being involved in the 2013 spot-fixing scandal.

The documentary series took three months for the completion of the writing, with the series being shot in India (Mumbai, Delhi, Chennai) and Australia. The distribution rights of the documentary were acquired by the digital platform Hotstar, and was eventually released under Hotstar Specials, the original content providing label of the streaming service, and the series is the first one to be released in the label. The series premiered on 20 March 2019 and was dubbed in Tamil and Hindi languages.

== Background ==
The documentary follows the comeback of the CSK franchise in 2018 after they missed out on playing in the world's richest T20 league, the Indian Premier League, for about two years. The documentary reveals the emotional memories and experiences one of India's most celebrated cricket players, MS Dhoni. Dhoni had faced serious allegations regarding spot fixing in 2013, and then led Chennai Super Kings to a title at the 2018 IPL tournament after two years of suspension from playing in the IPL. The trailer of the documentary revealed Dhoni speaking about the bad days of the CSK franchise as it was involved in the 2013 spot-fixing controversy along with fellow team Rajasthan Royals.

== Characters ==
- MS Dhoni as himself.
- Ravindra Jadeja as himself.
- Suresh Raina as himself.
- Shane Watson as himself.
- Dwayne Bravo as himself.
- Faf du Plessis as himself.
- Deepak Chahar as himself.
- Ambati Rayudu as himself.
- Stephen Fleming as himself.
- Matthew Hayden as himself.

== Episodes ==
No.	Title	Directed by	Written by	Original release date
1	"What Did We Do Wrong"	Amir Rizvi	Amardeep Galsin	20 March 2019
It showcases the different chapters that the docudrama will focus on later. It starts with MS Dhoni recalling the spot-fixing controversy in 2013 and likened it to the 2007 World Cup, when India failed to progress from the group stage. MS Dhoni further says that in 2007, the team didn't play well, but in 2013, the scenario was completely different.
2	"We Are Back"	Amir Rizvi	Amardeep Galsin	20 March 2019
In the episode, MS Dhoni recalls the incident and revealed that he was already emotional before heading to the stage, as he was asked to address the team after a video montage of the franchise and an emotional speech by franchise owner N Srinivasan.
3	"We Start Our Journey"	Amir Rizvi	Amardeep Galsin	20 March 2019
The episode showcases the re-entry game of CSK, which CSK dramatically won, and how CSK had to leave Chennai because of Cauvery issues.
4	"We Fall. We Rise"	Amir Rizvi	Amardeep Galsin	20 March 2019
In the episode, MS Dhoni admitted that the 'Dad's Army' trolls, who were going viral on social media at the time, were worrying. "At one stage, I started wondering whether these 'Daddy's army' jibes will come back to haunt us." Another segment shows the birth of Whistle Podu Express.
5	"We Win. We Roar"	Amir Rizvi	Amardeep Galsin	20 March 2019
The episode highlights MS Dhoni's cricketing mind. During the segment showcasing a match-winning innings by Faf du Plessis, a member of CSK's social media team recalled what the CSK captain had said about the Proteas batsman in the dressing room a few months before. "As I was watching du Plessis, I was just thinking about the time when Mahi bhai had said that Faf will step up in the toughest of situations."

== Production ==
On 15 January 2019, the streaming platform Hotstar, announced its foray to original content production exclusively for the service, with STAR India, the parent company of Hotstar, tied up with 15 Indian filmmakers for creating the shows for its label called Hotstar Specials. The series is the first one to be released under Hotstar Specials.

Filmmaker Kabir Khan, who served as the co-producer of the series, revealed that it took about nearly three months to make the documentary. It was his second sports film based on cricket after 83, which was based on the India's road to glory at the 1983 ICC Cricket World Cup. Coincidentally, former Indian captain Mahendra Singh Dhoni made his debut in a digital platform, through this project. The series consists of five episodes, each having a runtime of around 30 minutes. Portions of the series were shot in India (Mumbai, Delhi, Chennai) and Australia.

== Release ==
The official teaser for the series was unveiled on 5 March, followed by the trailer on 9 March. The documentary web series was supposed to have its special screening on 19 March 2019 at the M. A. Chidambaram Stadium, as it was based on the team Chennai Super Kings, but the plan was later dropped due to security concerns, as there were expectations of huge crowds for the event. The series eventually released through Hotstar on 20 March 2019, in Hindi and Tamil languages. The documentary received praise from the CSK teammates, along with popular actors and actresses giving support to the series.

== Reception ==
=== Critical response ===
Critic Priyansh of Firstpost reviewed the documentary series stating "From Roar of the Lion to the stands, cricket supporters are neglected with consummate ease. The fan experience, from the stadium to the television, is a relegated concern; the rich, the powerful, and the popular dictate the interests of those who run the game. For the privilege of the star cricketer, the iridescent lives of CSK fans are overlooked in a narrative laced with apathy and indifference. Supporters are cast as props, their voices matter only when they are heard chanting a cricketer's name. Otherwise, their bleatings is just ambient noise in the afterglow of the insuperable hero." Chandresh Narayanan of The Quint opined that "The series breezes through the middle phase of the tournament, but they don’t hold back when it comes to cracking a joke at their own expense." Vinayakk Mohanarajan of Scroll.in commented "A large part of the series is dedicated to the extraordinary connect the fans have developed with the franchise over the past decade."

=== Accolades ===
Year	Award	Category	Recipient	Result
2019	iReel Awards	Best Non Fiction Show	Roar of The Lion	Nominated

== See also ==
- Chennai Super Kings in 2018
- List of original programs distributed by Hotstar
- Hotstar Specials
