= Expo =

An expo is a trade exposition. It may also refer to:

== Events and venues ==
- World's fair, a large international public exposition
- Singapore Expo, convention and exposition venue
  - Expo Axis, one of the world's largest membrane roofs, constructed for the 2010 Shanghai Expo
  - Expo MRT station, part of the Singapore MRT Changi Airport Extension, built to handle fluctuating passenger volumes due to events at the adjacent Singapore Expo
- Expo Tel Aviv, convention and exhibition venue
- Floriade Expo, an international exhibition and garden festival in the Netherlands

== Arts, entertainment, and media ==
=== Music ===
- Expo (album), a 2005 album by Robert Schneider/Marbles
- Expo (Magnus Lindberg), a 2009 10-minute musical composition by Magnus Lindberg
- Expo (Stockhausen), a 1970 composition for three players by Karlheinz Stockhausen

=== Other arts, entertainment, and media ===
- Expo (magazine), a Swedish anti-fascist magazine
- Expo Channel, a home shopping channel in Australia
- Windows Live Expo (codenamed Fremont), a former online classified ads website and social media marketplace

== Brands and enterprises ==
- Expo Design Center, a chain of high end home furnishing and decor stores owned by The Home Depot
- Marker pens produced by Newell Custom Writing Instruments

== Technology ==
- LG eXpo, a mobile phone
- AMD Extended Profiles for Overclocking (EXPO), a standard for computer memory overclocking developed by AMD

== Other uses ==
- Montreal Expos, a baseball team located in Montreal from 1969 to 2004

== See also ==
- Exhibition (disambiguation)
- Expo Center (disambiguation)
- Exposition (disambiguation)
- Expository
