= Unsorted =

Indian television series

- Genre: Drama; Romance
- Written by: Rahul Bhatnagar
- Directed by: Rahul Bhatnagar
- Starring: Mugdha Agarwal; Vikram Bhui; Tanya Singh Bhatnagar
- Composer: Tusshar Mallek
- Country of origin: India
- Original language: Hindi
- No. of episodes: 3

Production
- Producer: Rahul Bhatnagar
- Cinematography: Aayush Gupta
- Running time: 22-24 minutes
- Production company: Natak Pictures

Original release
- Network: Disney+ Hotstar
- Release: 27 January 2023

Unsorted is an Indian romance drama television series that premiered on 27 January 2023 on Disney+ Hotstar. Produced under Natak Pictures, it stars Mugdha Agarwal, Vikram Bhui and Tanya Singh Bhatnagar.

== Cast ==
- Mugdha Agarwal as Tara
- Vikram Bhui as Naman
- Tanya Singh Bhatnagar as Seher

== Production ==
The series was announced on Disney+ Hotstar consisting of three episodes. Mugdha Agarwal, Vikram Bhui and Tanya Singh Bhatnagar were cast to appear in the series.

== Episodes ==
No.	Title	Directed by	Original release date
1	"It’s Complicated"	Rahul Bhatnagar	27 January 2023
2	"Let’s Call it Quits!"	Rahul Bhatnagar	27 January 2023
3	"All’s Well that Ends Well"	Rahul Bhatnagar	27 January 2023

== Reception ==
Archika Khurana of The Times of India rated the series 3/5 stars.
