= Exposed (Indian TV series) =

2022 Indian Telugu-language series

- Genre: Drama thriller
- Created by: K. Raghavendra Rao
- Directed by: Vijay Krishna
- Starring: Chennamaneni Vasudeva Rao; Harshitha B
- Composer: M Sai Madhukar
- Country of origin: India
- Original language: Telugu
- No. of seasons: 1
- No. of episodes: 55

Production
- Running time: 30 minutes
- Production company: RK Teleshow

Original release
- Network: Disney+ Hotstar
- Release: 6 October 2022 – 12 January 2023

Exposed is an Indian Telugu-language drama thriller series that premiered on 6 October 2022 on Disney+ Hotstar. Produced under the banner RK Teleshow, it stars Chennamaneni Vasudeva Rao and Harshitha B.

== Cast ==
- Chennamaneni Vasudeva Rao as Akash
- Harshitha B as Greeshma
- Awon Skies
- Sireesha Nulu as Varsha
- Karunaa Bhushan
- Meghana Kushi
- RJ Kajal
- Jhansi Rathod
- Kranthi Balivada
- Jaswanth Padala
- Suraj Reddy Muvva
- Vinayak Desai
- Srinivas Bhogi Reddy

== Reception ==
A critic from Indiaglitz rated the series 1/5 stars. Satya Pulagam of ABP Live awarded the series 2/5 stars. SakshiPost reviewed the series.

== See also ==
- List of Disney+ Hotstar original programming
