= Exhibition (disambiguation) =

An exhibition is an organized presentation and display of a selection of items.

Exhibition may also refer to:

- Art exhibition, a presentation of art
  - Solo show (art exhibition), a presentation of art by a single artist
- Exhibition drill, a form of complex military drill
- Exhibition (equestrian), a sport involving horses and riders
- Exhibition (scholarship), a financial award to scholars
- Exhibition game, a friendly match
- Exhibition (film), a film directed by Joanna Hogg
- Exhibition (album), a Gary Numan compilation album
- Exhibition Place, fairgrounds in Toronto, Ontario, Canada
- Exhibition GO Station, a station in the GO Transit network located in western Toronto, Ontario, Canada
- Exhibition, Saskatoon, a neighbourhood in Saskatoon, Canada

== See also ==
- Exhibition hall, where exhibitions are held
- Exhibitioner, a student who has been awarded an exhibition grant
- Exhibitionism, public displaying of nudity
- Expo (disambiguation)
- Fair
- Collection (artwork)
- Biennale
