= Expodroom =

Multi-purpose arena in Bree, Belgium

Coordinates: 51.147369°N 5.622854°E

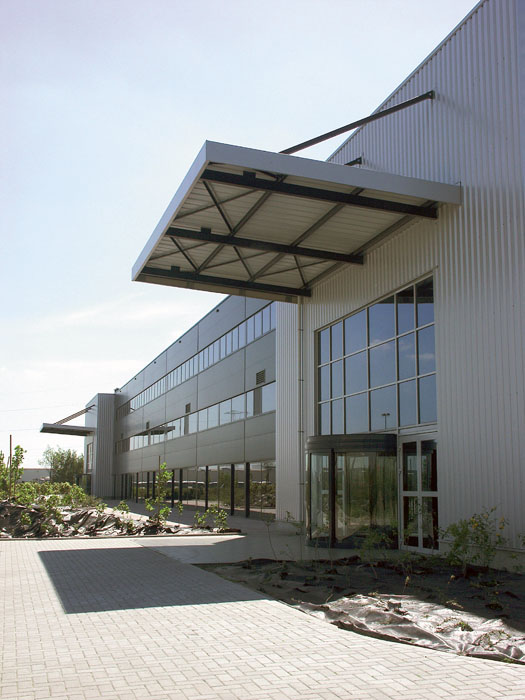

Expodroom is a multi-purpose arena in Bree, Belgium. Expodroom holds 4,000 people. It hosted the home games of the former basketball club Bree B.B.C. It has also hosted Fed Cup matches.
