= Exposition (album) =

Studio album by Wax on Radio
- Released: September 12, 2006
- Genre: Alternative
- Length: 72:23
- Label: Downtown Records

Exposition is the debut album by the band Wax on Radio.

== Track listing ==
1. "Today I Became a Realist" - 5:37
2. "Time Will Bind Us to the Guilt of Commitment" - 5:54
3. "Remembering" - 5:57
4. "Guilding the Lily" - 5:13
5. "The General of Medicine City" - 5:27
6. "Dawn Architects" - 4:02
7. "When in Rome..." - 7:45
8. "The Devil" - 7:05
9. "Give Me a Place to Stand and I Will Move the Earth" - 7:46

== Personnel ==
=== Band ===
- Mikey Russell – vocals, guitar
- Bob Buckstaff – guitar, Wurlitzer, tambourine
- Harrison Taylor – bass guitar, bells
- Sammy Del Real – drums, percussion

=== Other Personnel ===
- Mathieu Lejeune – engineer
- Will Brierre – assistant engineer
- Steve Hall – mastering
- Mark Needham – mixing
- Justin Perkins – drum engineering
