= Exposure =

Exposure(s) may refer to:

== Film and television ==
=== Films ===
- Exposure (1932 film), an American film
- Exposure, another name for the 1991 movie A Grande Arte starring Peter Coyote
- Exposure (2023 film), an American psychological thriller film

=== Television ===
==== Series ====
- Exposure (American TV series), a short film anthology series on Sci-Fi Channel from 2000–2002
- Exposure (British TV series), a current affairs strand on ITV which began in 2011
- Exposure (Australian TV series), a 2024 thriller TV series

==== Episodes ====
- "Exposure" (Dark Angel)
- "Exposure" (The Unit)

== Literature ==
- Exposure (Peet novel), a 2008 sports novel by Mal Peet
- Exposure (Reichs novel), a 2014 novel in the Virals series by Kathy and Brendan Reichs
- Exposure (Bilott book), a 2019 book by Robert Bilott
- Exposure, a 2016 novel by Helen Dunmore
- "Exposure", a 1918 poem by Wilfred Owen
- Exposure, a webcomic from Red Giant Entertainment

== Music ==
- The Exposures, a stage name of German electronic musician Jan Jelinek

=== Albums ===
- Exposure (Exposé album), 1987
- Exposure (Robert Fripp album), released in 1979
- Exposure (Gary Numan album), a compilation album, 2002
- Exposure (Esperanza Spalding album), 2017
- Exposures – In Retrospect and Denial, a 2004 compilation album by metal band Dark Tranquility

=== Songs ===
- "Exposure", a song from Projector by Dark Tranquillity
- "Exposure", a song from Discoveries by Northlane
- "Exposure", a song from the self-titled 1978 album Peter Gabriel

== Photography ==
- Exposure (photography), the quantity of light or other radiation reaching a photographic film
- Exposure value, a value given to all combinations of camera shutter speed and aperture that gives the same exposure

== Other uses ==
- Exposure (heights), in climbing and hiking, a terrain likely to cause injury when falling
- Exposure (infant), a form of child abandonment
- Exposure (magic), revealing magicians' secrets
- Exposure (sculpture), a 2010 steel frame sculpture located in the Netherlands
- Exposure to the elements (wind and cold), often leading to hypothermia
- Indecent exposure, the display of unclothed parts of the human body that is against local custom and law
- Market exposure, a measure of the proportion of money invested in the same industry sector

== See also ==
- Exposome
- Exposure of the dead, or sky burial
- Expose (disambiguation)
