= Cedar Creek Ice & Expo Center =

Proposed but unbuilt arena in Wausau, Wisconsin, USA

- Address: Wausau, Wisconsin; United States
- Capacity: 5,000
- Surface: Ice

Construction
- Built: N/A
- Opened: 2009 (proposed)
- Cost: $17 million
- Architect: JLG Architects

Cedar Creek Ice & Expo Center was a proposed 5,000-seat multi-purpose arena in Wausau, Wisconsin, that was abandoned in the planning stages. The Village of Rothschild sold the developers 8.43 acres (3.41 ha) of land for $1. It was to be completed in the fall of 2009, but lack of funding pushed the date back to 2010, then indefinitely. When opened, it was to be home to an expansion franchise in the United States Hockey League.
