= Disney+ Hotstar =

Indian streaming service

JioHotstar
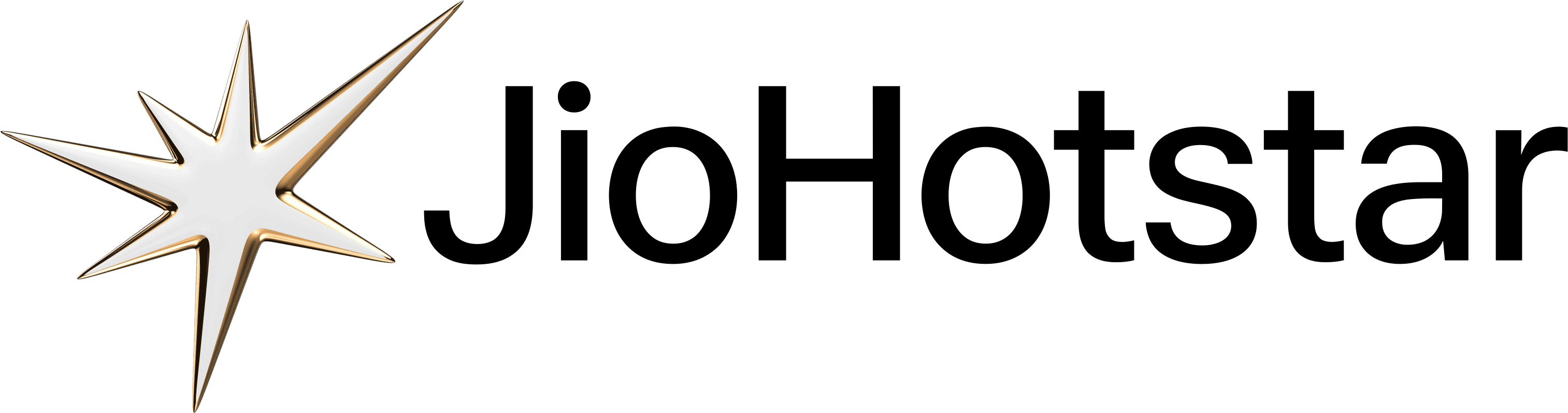
- Logo used since 2025
- Former names: Hotstar (2015–2026): Launched in India in 2015 (Rebranded as Disney+ Hotstar in 2020); Launched in the United States in 2017 (Merged with Disney+ in 2021); Launched in Canada in 2017, United Kingdom in 2018, Singapore in 2020 (Rebranded as JioHotstar in 2026); Disney+ Hotstar (2020–2025): Launched in India in 2020 (Rebranded as JioHotstar in 2025); Launched in Indonesia in 2020, and Malaysia and Thailand in 2021 (Rebranded as Disney+ in these territories in 2025)
- Company type: Streaming
- Website type: OTT platform
- Available in: Bengali; Bhojpuri; English; Gujarati; Haryanvi; Hindi; Kannada; Malayalam; Marathi; Odia; Punjabi; Tamil; Telugu
- Country of origin: India
- Area served: As an independent streaming service: India, Canada, United Kingdom, and Singapore; Through third-party distributors: Middle East and North Africa, (Note: As a content hub on Starzplay Arabia) Nepal, (Note: As a content hub on DGO) and United States (Note: Through Hulu)
- Founder: Star India
- Industry: Entertainment, mass media
- Parent: Star India (2015–2020; of Hotstar); Disney Star (2020–2025; of Disney+ Hotstar and Hotstar (Canada, Singapore, and United Kingdom); JioStar (2025–present; of JioHotstar (Canada, India, Singapore, and United Kingdom)
- Website: https://www.hotstar.com
- Commercial: Yes
- Registration: Required
- Users: 400 million (as of 17 October 2025)
- Launched: 11 February 2015; 11 years ago (as Hotstar)
- Current status: Active

Disney+ Hotstar, known as JioHotstar in India, Canada, Singapore, and the United Kingdom, is an Indian subscription video-on-demand, over-the-top streaming service owned by JioStar. The brand was introduced as Hotstar for a streaming service carrying content from Disney Star's (formerly Star India) local networks, including films, television series, live sports, and original programming, as well as featuring content licensed from third parties such as Showtime among others. Amid the significant growth of mobile broadband in India, Hotstar quickly became the dominant streaming service in the country.

Following the acquisition of Star India's parent company 21st Century Fox by Disney in 2019, Hotstar was integrated into Disney's global streaming brand Disney+ as "Disney+ Hotstar" in April 2020. The co-branded service added Disney+ original programming, and films and television series from its main content brands of Walt Disney Studios, Pixar, Marvel Studios, Lucasfilm, and National Geographic alongside the domestic and third-party content already carried on the platform. The Indian version of Disney+ Hotstar in India was merged with JioCinema in February 2025 to form JioHotstar.

Outside India, in Indonesia, Malaysia, and Thailand, Disney+ Hotstar is fully owned by the Walt Disney Company, where it similarly combines entertainment content licensed from local, third-party studios with the larger Disney+ library. Disney+ Hotstar in Indonesia, Malaysia, and Thailand became Disney+ on 9 October 2025 as part of the rebranding of Star into Hulu in the global market. In Singapore, Canada, and the United Kingdom, Hotstar operates as a streaming service targeting the Indian diaspora, focusing on Disney Star's domestic entertainment and sports content, and Disney+ operates as a standalone service in these markets. Hotstar formerly operated in the United States as well, but it was closed in 2021 and its content was folded into Hulu and ESPN+. JioHotstar was later launched in Canada, Singapore, and the United Kingdom on 1 September 2026.

JioHotstar is the second largest streaming platform in the world in terms of subscribers in 2025, only behind Netflix.

== History ==
=== Hotstar ===
First logo of Hotstar from 2015 until 2020.

Star India officially launched Hotstar on 11 February 2015 after fifteen months of development, coinciding with the 2015 Cricket World Cup and the 2015 Indian Premier League (for which Star had acquired the streaming rights). The ad-supported service initially featured a library of over 35,000 hours of content in seven regional languages, as well as live streaming coverage of sports such as football and kabaddi, and cricket on a delay. Star CEO Sanjay Gupta felt that there "[weren't] many platforms available to Indian consumers offering high-quality, curated content besides, say, YouTube", and explained that the service would appeal most prominently to the growing young adult demographic, and feature "very targeted" advertising. He estimated that by 2020, the service could account for nearly a quarter of Star's annual revenue.

Hotstar generated at least 345 million views throughout the 2015 Cricket World Cup, and approximately over 200 million views during the 2015 Indian Premier League season. In April 2016, Hotstar launched a subscription tier primarily oriented towards international content and the possibility of premium sports content. The service launched alongside a new deal to carry HBO content uncut on the platform, with its introduction coinciding with the season 6 premiere of Game of Thrones.

The 2016 launch of the LTE-only wireless carrier Jio spurred the growth of mobile broadband in India and was credited in turn for having bolstered the growth of streaming video in the country. While services of US origin such as Amazon Prime Video and Netflix saw some growth in the Indian market, Hotstar remained the dominant streaming service. By July 2017, Hotstar's apps had reached 300 million downloads, and it was reported as being the top video streaming app in the country.

In May 2018, it was reported that the service had 75–100 million active users per month. In September 2018, Hotstar CEO Ajit Mohan left to become the vice president and managing director of Facebook India. That same month, it was reported that the service had begun to restructure its leadership to have separate executives for its ad-supported and premium services, and, aided by new funding from Star US Holdings, planned to increase its production of premium original content to better compete with Amazon and Netflix, amidst concerns that the service was beginning to haemorrhage cash.

By 2019, the service had over 150 million active users monthly. In March 2019, ahead of the 2019 Indian Premier League, Hotstar migrated existing subscribers of its All Annual Sports plan to a new entry-level plan known as Hotstar VIP. Intended as an introductory option, it includes access to sports content (including the IPL, 2019 Cricket World Cup, and Premier League football), early access to serials before their television broadcast, and original series from the new Hotstar Specials banner. It is also payable via cash. Chief product officer Varun Narang described the offering as "a value proposition built with the Indian audience at the heart of it".

The 2019 Indian Premier League repeatedly broke records for concurrent viewership on Hotstar, with the 2019 final setting a new "global record" peak of 18.6 million. US website TechCrunch credited these gains to the extensive growth of internet usage in the country. This was surpassed during the semi-final of the 2019 Cricket World Cup between India and New Zealand, with 25.3 million. After the India-Pakistan match earlier in the tournament, Hotstar surpassed almost 100 million daily users.

=== Acquisition by Disney, integration with Disney+ (2019–2023) ===
Former logo of Disney+ Hotstar from 2020 to 2024. It was dropped in favour of the teal version.

Second former Disney+ Hotstar logo from 2024 to 2025.

Star, and in turn Hotstar, were acquired by the Walt Disney Company in 2019, as part of its acquisition of their US parent company 21st Century Fox.

During a February 2020 earnings call, Iger announced that its recently launched international streaming brand Disney+ and its original programming would be integrated into Hotstar as part of a re-launch on 29 March 2020. Iger stated that the service's launch—originally scheduled to coincide with the opening of the 2020 Indian Premier League—would take advantage of Hotstar's existing infrastructure and customer base. The Motley Fool described Hotstar as being Disney's "secret weapon" in the market, due to its already-dominant position.

Hotstar began to soft launch the expanded service for some users in March. On 20 March 2020, in recognition of the COVID-19 pandemic and the associated postponement of the IPL season, the launch was pushed back to 3 April. The service officially launched with a "virtual red carpet premiere" of The Lion King and Disney+ series The Mandalorian, featuring actors Rana Daggubati, Katrina Kaif, Shraddha Kapoor, Hrithik Roshan, and Tiger Shroff participating in live interactions. The price of the Hotstar Premium service was also increased with the launch.

On 2 May 2020, Star announced that it would distribute the service for free to Labour in India in Singapore through 21 July, to improve morale amid their impact from COVID-19. In June 2020, Hotstar named Sunil Rayan, formerly of Google, as its new president.

In August 2020, Disney announced that it would begin extending the Disney+ Hotstar service to other territories, beginning with Indonesia. The company also announced that it would similarly use the branding Star (as originated from Star Asia) for general entertainment streaming services in markets outside of the United States. Unlike Disney+ Hotstar-branded services, however, the Star brand is used as an equivalent to Disney's U.S. streaming brand Hulu (which has less recognition outside of the U.S.), and generally consists of a content hub added to existing Disney+ services (unlike Disney+ Hotstar, which is based on Hotstar's platform). In Latin America, Star was released as a second service, Star+, which also features ESPN content.

In February 2023, Disney reported that Disney+ had a net loss of 2.4 million subscribers worldwide in the first fiscal quarter of 2023, with its loss of streaming rights to the IPL in India to Viacom18 being the main contributing factor.

In February 2023, it was reported that HBO's original programming would be moving from Hotstar, possibly related to an announcement by Disney CEO Bob Iger regarding a restructuring and cutting $5.5 billion in costs at the Walt Disney Company. This was confirmed by the platform via a tweet the following month, announcing that HBO original programming would be removed from the platform from 31 March, including series such as Game of Thrones, its spinoff House of the Dragon, Succession and the ongoing series The Last of Us. Although it was speculated by analysts that HBO content would be made available on Amazon Prime Video, where HBO Max original programming, as well as films from the Warner Bros. Pictures library, are currently available, Reliance Industries/Viacom18's JioCinema signed a deal with Warner Bros. Discovery in April 2023 for the HBO, Warner Bros. Pictures and HBO Max content libraries to be made available on the platform.

In response to JioCinema's decision to stream the entirety of the 2023 IPL for free, Disney+ Hotstar announced in June 2023 that it would stream the 2023 Asia Cup and 2023 Cricket World Cup for free on mobile devices.

=== Merger with JioCinema and JioHotstar rebranding (2024–present) ===
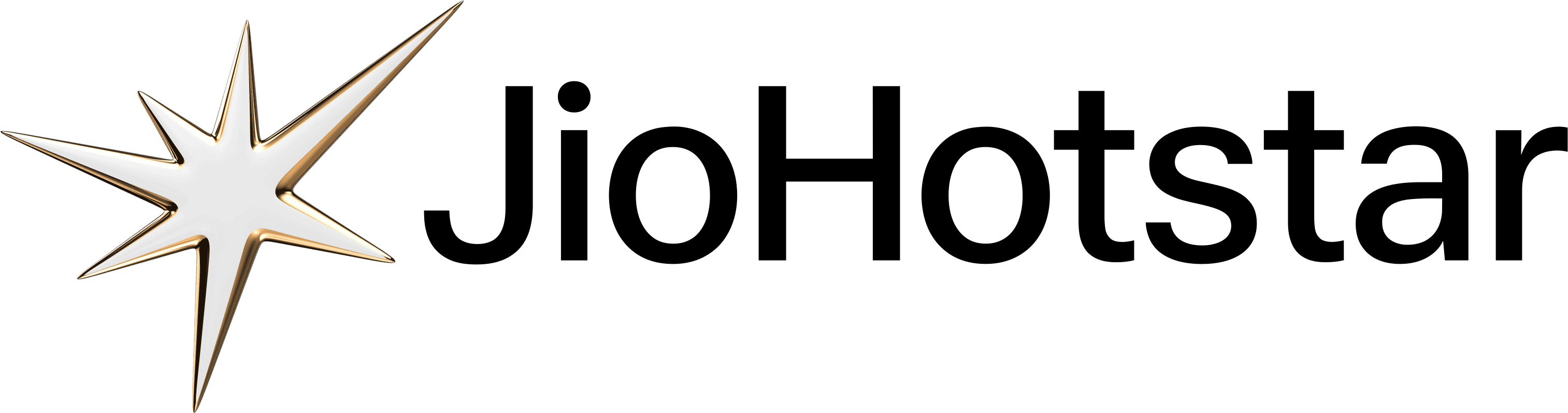
The JioHotstar logo used since 2025

In November 2024, Disney completed a merger of its Indian television and streaming assets with Reliance Industries, forming a joint venture known as JioStar. The new entity is held primarily by Viacom18 and Reliance holding a 63.16%, with Disney holding a 36.84% stake and Reliance serving as the operating partner. In December 2024, it was reported that the company had acquired a domain name for "JioHotstar", indicating an impending merger of Disney+ Hotstar with its now-former rival JioCinema.

On 14 February 2025, the Disney+ Hotstar and JioCinema services in India were merged to form JioHotstar; JioStar's CEO of digital Kiran Mani—former head of Google Play in the Asia-Pacific—explained that the service aimed to "make premium entertainment truly accessible to all Indians". At launch, JioStar promoted that the merged platform featured over 300,000 hours worth of content, while plans were announced for at least 40 to 50 new original series and 1,100 hours of regional language programming per-year, and a new short-form content initiative known as "Sparks" involving top Indian content creators. Sports properties such as the IPL, as well as rights to HBO and Paramount Global (both become part of Skydance) content among others inherited from JioCinema, would also return to the platform.

On 1 September 2026, JioStar announced that Hotstar would rebrand as JioHotstar and eventually launched in Canada, Singapore, and the United Kingdom. Additionally, on 3 September, JioHotstar was added to the available apps on Sky Q, Glass and Stream in the United Kingdom.

== Content ==
Disney+ Hotstar's content library draws from Disney Star's television networks, including its entertainment networks and Star Sports. Imported content is drawn primarily from Walt Disney Studios and Disney General Entertainment Content, and includes Disney+ original programming and the core Disney+ libraries of Disney (including Pixar), Marvel Studios, Lucasfilm (including the Star Wars franchises), and National Geographic. It also holds licensing agreements with other third-party content providers, such as streaming rights (for the Indian markets) to library programming from NBCUniversal (including Peacock original programming) and Skydance (including Showtime, Paramount+, Discovery+, HBO and HBO Max original programming).

In July 2017, Hotstar gained domestic streaming rights to first-run and library programming from Showtime. Rights to new Showtime content later moved to Viacom18's Voot (a sister of Showtime via then-parent company and one of Skydance predecessors Paramount Global). In October 2018, Hotstar partnered with Hooq to offer its content on its premium service, including rights to films and series from its co-owners Sony Pictures and Warner Bros., as well as its other content partners. The partnership ended following Hooq's liquidation in April 2020. The partnership with HBO ended in 2023. Rights to both HBO and Paramount content returned to the service in February 2025 following the JioCinema merger.

Some early original content on the service included the news satire program On Air With AIB and CinePlay. In March 2019, the service launched a new premium original content brand, Hotstar Specials, with the first production being Roar of the Lion—a docudrama miniseries chronicling the Chennai Super Kings in the 2018 Indian Premier League. Hotstar stated that these series would be at least six episodes in length, be available in seven regional languages (Bengali, Hindi, Kannada, Malayalam, Marathi, Tamil and Telugu) and focus on providing "big-scale, high-quality drama". Hotstar partnered with a large number of Indian filmmakers to produce a series for the brand.

In June 2020, Hotstar announced that it would begin to offer direct-to-streaming premieres of Indian films under the "Disney+ Hotstar Multiplex" banner due to COVID-19-related cinema closures, beginning with Star Studios' Dil Bechara on 24 July 2020, followed by The Big Bull, Lootcase, Khuda Haafiz, Laxmii, Bhuj: The Pride of India, Sadak 2, and Mookuthi Amman.

== Sports content ==
The following digital streaming rights were held as of 13 February 2025 (Indian markets only):

=== Cricket ===
- BCCI (2023–2028)
- IPL (2023–2027)
- SA20 (2023–2032)
- Women's Premier League (2023–2027)
- Cricket in South Africa (2024–2031)
- Cricket in Australia
- BBL
- ICC Events
- Major League Cricket

In May 2025, JioHotstar secured the exclusive digital streaming rights for 2025 Tendulkar-Anderson Trophy, following a sub-licensing agreement with Sony Entertainment Network, which retained linear television rights.

=== Football ===
- English Premier League
- Super League Kerala
- Indian Super League
- Scottish Premiership
- Scottish Championship

=== Field Hockey ===
- FIH Events

=== Kabaddi ===
- Pro Kabaddi League

=== Kho Kho ===
- Kho Kho World Cup

=== MMA ===
- Matrix Fight Night
- One Championship

=== Tennis ===
- Wimbledon Championships
- US Open

=== Badminton ===
- BWF World Championships
- BWF World Tour
- Premier Badminton League

== Device support and service features ==
Hotstar allows users to stream on up to four devices concurrently depending on their plan, and downloads for offline viewing depending on individual content licenses. Most content is able to be streamed in resolutions up to 1080p. In April 2020, Hotstar started rolling out Dolby Digital sound on Android TV, Apple TV, Amazon Fire TV, Amazon Fire HD, and Roku, and later 4K with HDR in August 2020, initially for Apple TV and Android TV devices.

In India, the service was previously offered with "VIP" and "Premium" subscription tiers, which were differentiated by their content libraries (with the Premium tier featuring more premium international series and films). In September 2021, Hotstar introduced a new plan structure based on device support and concurrent streams (more akin to that of Netflix), with "Mobile" allowing a single stream on a mobile device only, "Super" allowing streams on up to two devices simultaneously, and "Premium" allowing streaming on up to four devices simultaneously, and with 4K support. Under the new plan structure, the same content library became available to all Disney+ Hotstar subscribers regardless of tier.

The service is also available in a free ad-supported version.

== Availability ==
=== North America and the United Kingdom ===
On 4 September 2017, Star Sports acquired the media rights to the Indian Premier League, with Hotstar acting as the international digital rightsholder. Hotstar launched an international subscription service in Canada and the United States, aimed towards providing its domestic Indian content and sports. Hotstar launched in the United Kingdom on 13 September 2018, to coincide with the 2018 Asia Cup.

On 4 January 2019, Star discontinued its international linear pay television channels in the United States (such as StarPlus), pivoting its focus in the region to Hotstar. On 31 August 2021, Disney announced that it would, in turn, discontinue Hotstar in the United States, in favour of hosting its sports and entertainment content on ESPN+ and Hulu respectively beginning 1 September. Annual subscribers who had not yet subscribed to Disney's streaming services were provided with an offer to receive the Disney Bundle (Disney+, ESPN+, and Hulu) at no cost for the remainder of their Hotstar subscription period. The shutdown was later scheduled for 30 November 2021.

=== Asia and MENA ===
In August 2019, Disney CEO Bob Iger stated that plans were in place for the expansion of Hotstar into Southeast Asia. In August 2020, it was announced that Disney+ Hotstar would launch in Indonesia on 5 September 2020, marking the unified service's first expansion outside of India. On 19 October 2020, Star India announced the launch of Hotstar in Singapore, which took place on 1 November 2020. On 25 February 2021, it was reported that Disney+ Hotstar would launch in Malaysia and Thailand in 2021. The service launched in Malaysia on 1 June 2021, and in Thailand on 30 June.

In addition to content from Disney's library, the Southeast Asian versions of Disney+ Hotstar also had a large focus on domestic acquisitions. In Indonesia, Hotstar reached content supply agreements with studios such as Falcon Pictures, MD Pictures, Rapi Films, Soraya Intercine Films, Screenplay Films, and Starvision Plus among others, and also acquired first-run direct-to-streaming releases (which are being marketed as Hotstar Originals). To appeal to the local Indian ethnicity population, the service also carries Hindi cinema films subtitled or dubbed into the Indonesian language.

The Malaysian version of the service has similarly reached deals with studios such as Skop Productions, Revolution Media Films, Media Prima, WAU Animation, Act 2 Pictures, Les' Copaque Production and Red Films to carry films on the platform, with some being released direct-to-streaming. The Thai version reached agreements with studios and broadcasters such as GDH, GMM 25, Kantana Group, One 31, and Sahamongkolfilm, and has licensed content from other East Asian regions such as China, Hong Kong, Japan, South Korea and Taiwan.

In January 2022, Disney+ Hotstar announced that it had acquired rights to the WWE Network in Indonesia, with its content and live events becoming available on the platform at no additional charge, but ended in 2024.

On 9 October 2025, Disney+ Hotstar was rebranded as Disney+ in Southeast Asian countries like Indonesia, Malaysia, and Thailand. Disney made this global change to streamline its services and make the viewer experience more consistent; as part of this, the Star brand was replaced by Hulu.

In July 2026, the international version of the Disney+ app expanded its language support to 58 audio languages and over 30 user interface languages, while offering subtitles in up to 42 languages. The update introduced localized support for languages including Arabic, Indonesian, Hindi, and Thai, as well as a native right-to-left (RTL) interface for scripts such as Arabic and Hebrew. Beginning in September 2026, Disney phased out the Hotstar-derived variant of the Disney+ app in the remaining countries where it was still used, replacing it with the international version of the Disney+ app. The transition was started in Egypt on 2 September, followed by Indonesia on 3 September, South Africa and Israel on 9 September, Thailand on 16 September, the rest of the MENA markets on 6 October, and Malaysia and the Philippines on 7 October.

In October 2026, JioHotstar expanded into the MENA region through a partnership with Starzplay on 6 October 2026. Under the agreement, JioHotstar operates as a dedicated hub within the Starzplay app and website, providing subscribers with access to original series, films, television programming, and reality franchises in multiple South Asian languages—with a particular emphasis on Malayalam-language content to target the region's large Keralite diaspora. Offered under Starzplay's subscription tiers, the launch followed JioHotstar's international rollouts in the United Kingdom, Canada, and Singapore, and was marked by a promotional display on the Burj Khalifa in Dubai. Additionally, JioHotstar expanded its presence into Nepal by partnering with local streaming platform DGO to offer its catalog of Indian films, original series, television programming, and reality shows on 18 October 2026.

Launch as JioHotstar
Release date	Country/territory	Release partner(s)
14 February 2025	India	None
2 September 2026	Canada	None
2 September 2026	United Kingdom	None
2 September 2026	Singapore	StarHub

Current distribution partners
Country/territory	Partner (main services)	Expiry	Refs.
MENA	Starzplay Arabia	N/A	
Nepal	DGO	N/A	
United States	Hulu	N/A	

Note:

1. In India, Hotstar was launched in 2015, later rebranded as Disney+ Hotstar in 2020, and then it rebranded as JioHotstar in 2025.
2. In the United States, it was shut down as Hotstar on 30 November 2021, and its contents were moved to Hulu and ESPN+, now available as Disney+.
3. In Canada, United Kingdom, Singapore, both JioHotstar and Disney+ operate.

== Criticism and censorship ==
=== Censorship of Last Week Tonight in India ===
The HBO series Last Week Tonight faced several instances of censorship on Hotstar since the purchase of the service by Disney; two episodes were edited to remove jokes referencing Disney characters, including a November 2019 episode on the US census relating to a PSA featuring Mickey Mouse (where Oliver claimed the character was a "crack addict"; a scene was also cropped to obscure a graphic relating to the joke), and a joke about Donald Duck having a penis "shaped like a corkscrew" during an episode discussing China's one-child policy. In February 2020, Hotstar refused to carry an episode that contained segments critical of prime minister Narendra Modi, which had opined that his policy of Hindu nationalism was a growing threat to democracy in India.

The programme's host John Oliver addressed all three instances of censorship by Hotstar in the 8 March 2020 episode. He placed a larger emphasis on the censorship of Disney references, however (noting that he had played Zazu in Disney's 2019 CGI remake of The Lion King), jokingly arguing that he resented the censorship of his "factually accurate" Donald Duck joke more than the Modi episode being pulled.

=== PAL speedup and cuts ===
The service was highly criticised and ridiculed upon its launch in Thailand for the censorship and editing of Disney content, where violent and/or suggestive scenes were cut out or blurred, with a majority of titles being cropped to fit 16:9 widescreen televisions and/or also sped up to 25 frames per second (PAL). On 14 July 2021, during a live podcast hosted by Thai news reporter Jomquan Laopetch, Disney Southeast Asia and Thailand general manager, direct-to-consumer Winradit Kolasastraseni stated that he was aware of the issues and admitted they were the QC team's fault; the service has been replacing censored/edited video files with their original cuts since then.
