= Exposures – In Retrospect and Denial =

Exposures - In Retrospect and Denial

Compilation album by Dark Tranquillity
- Released: 24 May 2004
- Recorded: Kraków, Poland on 7 October 2002 (Disc 2)
- Genre: Melodic death metal; gothic metal
- Length: 141:43
- Language: English
- Label: Century Media
- Producer: Fredrik Nordström (Disc 2)

Dark Tranquillity chronology
Live Damage (2003)	Exposures - In Retrospect and Denial (2004)	Lost to Apathy (2004)

Professional ratings
Review scores
Source	Rating
Allmusic	3/5 stars

Exposures – In Retrospect and Denial is the first compilation album by Swedish melodic death metal band Dark Tranquillity, that was released in 2004.

Disc 1 Tracks 1 and 2 were recorded during the Damage Done sessions in 2002. Track 1 had been unreleased, and track 2 had been only available on the Japanese version of the album.

Disc 1 Tracks 3–5 were recorded during the Haven sessions in 2000. Tracks 3 and 4 had been unreleased, and track 5 had been only available on the Japanese version of the album.

Disc 1 Tracks 6 and 7 were recorded during the Projector sessions in 1998. Track 6 had been available on the limited digipak edition of the album, and track 7 was on a Limited Edition of this album.

Disc 1 Tracks 8 and 9 were taken from the A Moonclad Reflection EP (1992).

Disc 1 Tracks 10–12 were taken from the Trail of Life Decayed demo (1991).

Some early versions of the release for Disc 1, have the tracks 3 & 4 and 6 & 7 flipped or misprinted.

== Track listing ==
=== Disc 1 ===
All lyrics are written by Mikael Stanne, except tracks 10–11 by Niklas Sundin and track 12 by Sundin, Stanne.

No.	Title	Music	Length
1.	"Static"	Martin Henriksson, Anders Jivarp, Martin Brändström	4:40
2.	"The Poison Well"	Jivarp, Sundin, Henriksson	4:08
3.	"In Sight"	Stanne, Jivarp, Henriksson	4:11
4.	"Misery in Me"	Stanne, Jivarp, Sundin, Henriksson	4:40
5.	"Cornered"	Henriksson, Brändström	3:59
6.	"No One"	Henriksson, Sundin	4:41
7.	"Exposure"	Henriksson, Johansson, Sundin	3:52
8.	"Yesterworld"	Sundin, Henriksson, Stanne	7:29
9.	"Unfurled by Dawn"	Sundin, Henriksson, Stanne	7:31
10.	"Midwinter/Beyond Enlightenment"	Sundin, Stanne	5:43
11.	"Vernal Awakening"	Sundin, Henriksson	5:21
12.	"Void of Tranquillity"	Sundin, Henriksson, Jivarp	7:26

=== Disc 2 ===
All lyrics are written by Mikael Stanne, except where noted.

No.	Title	Lyrics	Music	Length
1.	"The Wonders at Your Feet"		Brändström, Jivarp, Henriksson	3:52
2.	"The Treason Wall"		Jivarp, Henriksson	3:35
3.	"Hedon"	Niklas Sundin	Henriksson, Sundin	4:39
4.	"White Noise/Black Silence"		Henriksson, Jivarp	4:14
5.	"Haven"		Jivarp, Henriksson	4:02
6.	"Punish My Heaven"		Johansson, Sundin, Jivarp	5:00
7.	"Monochromatic Stains"		Jivarp, Brändström	3:43
8.	"Indifferent Suns"		Michael Nicklasson, Henriksson	3:40
9.	"Format C: For Cortex"		Jivarp, Henriksson, Sundin	4:32
10.	"Insanity's Crescendo"		Henriksson, Johansson, Sundin	5:16
11.	"Hours Passed in Exile"		Henriksson, Jivarp, Nicklasson, Brändström	4:58
12.	"The Sun Fired Blanks"		Henriksson, Sundin, Johansson	4:33
13.	"Damage Done"		Henriksson, Jivarp	3:23
14.	"Lethe"	Sundin	Henriksson	3:59
15.	"Not Built to Last"		Jivarp, Henriksson, Brändström	3:49
16.	"ThereIn"		Henriksson, Sundin	5:34
17.	"Zodijackyl Light"		Sundin, Johansson	3:59
18.	"Final Resistance"		Henriksson	3:08
19.	"Ex Nihilo" (instrumental)		Sundin, Henriksson, Nicklasson	2:05

== Credits ==
Dark Tranquillity

- Mikael Stanne – vocals (disc 1, 1–7), (disc 2, 1–18), backing vocals, guitar (disc 1, 8–12)
- Martin Henriksson – guitar (disc 1, 1–5), (disc 2), bass (disc 1, 6–12)
- Michael Nicklasson – bass (disc 1, 1–5), (disc 2)
- Martin Brändström – keyboards and electronics (disc 1, 1–5), (disc 2)
- Niklas Sundin – guitar
- Anders Jivarp – drums
- Fredrik Johansson − guitar (disc 1, 5 & 6)
- Anders Fridén – vocals (disc 1, 8–12)

Other personnel

- Göran Finnberg – mastering (disc 2)
- Cabin Fever Media – art direction and design
