= List of Ejen Ali episodes =

Episode list of Ejen Ali

Ejen Ali (literally translated as Agent Ali), is a Malaysian animated television series produced by WAU Animation, focusing on a boy which accidentally became a MATA agent after using Infinity Retinal Intelligent System (I.R.I.S), a device prototype created by Meta Advance Tactical Agency (M.A.T.A).

== Series overview ==
Series	Episodes		Originally released	
Series	Episodes		First released	Last released
1	13		8 April 2016	3 March 2017
2	13		22 September 2017	30 March 2018
Movie			November 28, 2019	
3	13	7	25 June 2022	6 August 2022
3	13	6	24 December 2022	28 January 2023
Movie			May 22, 2025	

== Episodes ==
=== Season 1 (2016–17) ===
No. overall	No. in season	Title	Original release date
1	1	"Mission: IRIS (Misi: IRIS)"	8 April 2016
Ali is a normal 12-year-old schoolboy who struggles in school, is a victim of bullying, and lacks of parental love. His life changes forever when he accidentally wields a spy tech stolen by two evil spies.
2	2	"Mission: Alpha (Misi: ALPHA)"	15 April 2016
When Dr. Tong suddenly announces his retirement, this raises suspicion of M.A.T.A. and Ali is sent into his first mission - using the I.R.I.S.
3	3	"Mission: Even (Misi: SERI)"	22 April 2016
While trying to stop Komeng and his men from stealing the drones, Ali meets a mysterious ally who helps him to defeat them. But things get a turn when Ali finds out the identity of the mysterious ally.
4	4	"Mission: Comot (Misi: COMOT)"	22 July 2016
After saving a stray cat from being run over by a car, Ali realizes that the cat reminds him of his old pet cat Labu, who ran away from house after his mother's death. Hence, he adopts it. What he does not know is that the cat has ulterior motives - to steal the I.R.I.S.
5	5	"Mission: Blueprint (Misi: BLUEPRINT)"	29 July 2016
When Dos and Trez manage to steal two pieces of pen drive that contain the blueprint of I.R.I.S., the M.A.T.A. agents are on a mission to retrieve them before they can decrypt it.
6	6	"Mission: Rise Up (Misi: BANGKIT)"	5 August 2016
After Dr. Tong and Dr. Mala are being victimized by Dr. Aaron, Ali, Bakar, Alicia and Comot must protect Dr. Ghazali from him before it is too late.
7	7	"Mission: Protocol Gegas (Misi: PROTOKOL GEGAS)"	28 October 2016
When a mission goes wrong, Alicia states that she would have summoned "Protocol Gegas" if it wasn't for the I.R.I.S. that Ali wears because M.A.T.A. promises to keep him alive. When there is a power disruption occurring in Cyberaya, the M.A.T.A. agents are sent to investigate the power plants. During the mission, Ali is horrified to learn about the purpose of "Protocol Gegas" from Bakar. When the protocol is really being used, will he follow it?
8	8	"Mission: Performance (Misi: PRESTASI)"	4 November 2016
After the previous mission goes wrong, General Rama discusses with Ali and the other M.A.T.A. agents about Ali's performance, and must decide whether to keep or eliminate Ali.
9	9	"Mission: Potential (Misi: Potensi)"	11 November 2016
Since the previous episode, Rizwan is now Ali's mentor and he must train him to be a better agent despite he has doubts on Ali.
10	10	"Mission: Sensation (Misi: Sensasi)"	30 December 2016
After the video of Ali saving Aunty Faye's life goes viral on Internet, Ali creates a new page for his agent self and has become obsessed of the popularity he gains. However, his new-found fame will bring grave danger to him.
11	11	"Mission: Evidence (Misi: Bukti)"	6 January 2017
Unable to believe that Bakar is the traitor of M.A.T.A., Ali is determined to prove that he is innocent.
12	12	"Mission: Uno (Misi: Uno)"	13 January 2017
Uno has hacked into M.A.T.A. headquarters and his only mission is to capture Ali.
13	13	"Mission: Override (Misi: Override)"	3 March 2017
Uno and his team have captured Ali and they are going to extract the I.R.I.S. out of him! Ali is determined not to let it fall to the wrong hands, while the other M.A.T.A. agents try to protect Ali. Will they succeed?

=== Season 2 (2017–18) ===
No. overall	No. in season	Title	Original release date
14	1	"Mission: Academy (Misi: Akademi)"	22 September 2017
Ali, Bakar, Comot and Alicia are going to M.A.T.A. Academy, but first, Ali must be prepared for the test to be qualified to enter.
15	2	"Mission: Orientation (Misi: Orientasi)"	29 September 2017
After being accepted into the academy, Ali is welcomed greatly by everyone including the junior agents, except for one.
16	3	"Mission: Play (Misi: Main)"	6 October 2017
General Rama sends the agents of M.A.T.A. Academy for their first mission - to stop a villain who has hacked into the Cyberaya train station.
17	4	"Mission: Analog (Misi: Analog)"	13 October 2017
An unknown old man who despises technology is wreaking havoc across Cyberaya.
18	5	"Mission: Challenge (Misi: Cabar)"	17 November 2017
An agent working for Uno infiltrates M.A.T.A. Academy.
19	6	"Mission: Milk (Misi: Susu)"	24 November 2017
Chaos await when Ali has to babysit Aunty Fay' s grandchild.
20	7	"Mission: Return (Misi: Kembali)"	1 December 2017
Rizwan returns to help the mentors in a mission.
21	8	"Mission: Purpose (Misi: Tujuan)"	8 December 2017
Rizwan turns against M.A.T.A. while Ali greatly doubts himself in being an agent.
22	9	"Mission: Role (Misi: Peranan)"	9 February 2018
Ali must learn to understand the roles of each pillar. Meanwhile, Rizwan goes to find Cuatro.
23	10	"Mission: Atlas (Misi: Atlas)"	16 February 2018
Analogman returns with new allies to cause chaos in the Cyberaya, Meanwhile Ali created a new invention called I.R.I.S. Atlas.
24	11	"Mission: Hope (Misi: Harapan)"	23 February 2018
This story focuses on Rizwan infiltrating the base of the Numeros, and the backstory of Rudy.
25	12	"Mission: Diez (Misi: Diez)"	23 March 2018
The M.A.T.A. agents prepares to defend Cyberaya as the Numeros are on their way to infiltrate M.A.T.A. Academy.
26	13	"Mission: Legacy (Misi: Legasi)"	30 March 2018
The final battle between Zain and Uno has begun.

=== Season 3 (2022–23) ===
On 25 June 2022, the third season premiered exclusively on Disney+ Hotstar in most Southeast Asian countries, including Malaysia.

No. overall	No. in season	Title	Original release date
Part 1
27	1	"Mission: Arena (Misi: ARENA)"	25 June 2022
The M.A.T.A. Academy agents were summoned to the M.A.T.A. Arena where they compete in the prestigious competition alongside four newly-introduced international agents. Meanwhile, Dos joined Rizwan's side as Cinco is planning to re-establish Numeros and leads an assault to M.A.T.A. once more.
28	2	"Mission: Possible (Misi: BOLEH)"	2 July 2022
Both the M.A.T.A. Academy and international agents competed in the first round of the Arena, whereas Ali finds it difficult to pass first level in training without the I.R.I.S.
29	3	"Mission: Upgrade (Misi: UPGRADE)"	9 July 2022
After winning the first round, Ali, Alicia, Kim and Aleks were rewarded an upgrade to their gadgets and weapons by Agent Geetha as Ali struggles to find a suitable one. Meanwhile, Rizwan and Dos met the Numeros alongside their leader Cinco with a newly-upgraded powers leading to their battle.
30	4	"Mission: Payback (Misi: BALAS)"	16 July 2022
Intense rivalries emerged between the M.A.T.A. Academy and international agents in the competition's second round as pranks and sabotages played by both sides led to their grudge on each other.
31	5	"Mission: Blackout (Misi: BLACKOUT)"	23 July 2022
A sudden electrical outrage caused a blackout within the M.A.T.A. Arena with a group of the M.A.T.A. Academy and international agents stuck together seemingly blaming amongst them for the power interruption.
32	6	"Mission: Hunt (Misi: BURU)"	30 July 2022
As per request by Dato' Hisham for the competition's third round, the agents were grouped into three teams with each their respective core assignments and they were competed at the Cyberaya Science Centre for the first time outside the Arena in a series of "treasure hunt" mission. During the challenge, Ali, Alicia and Kim were surprised to see Rizwan and Dos in the lab containing Azurium-powered commercial jet engine.
33	7	"Mission: Trap (Misi: JERAT)"	6 August 2022
Chaos happened at the Cyberaya Science Centre as the M.A.T.A. agents were cross paths with Rizwan and Dos. While they were distracted, Numeros unleash havoc leaving the path of destructions inside.
Part 2
34	8	"Mission: Change (Misi: UBAH)"	24 December 2022
All agents are gathered by Leon to inform them of a new 'change' - they would be swapped in their pillars to different ones to proceed with next training arc.
35	9	"Mission: Hybrid (Misi: HYBRID)"	31 December 2022
Agents are geared up to work with their new skills and gadgets: as a hybrid from of their old and new pillar forms.
36	10	"Mission: Camp (Misi: KHEMAH)"	7 January 2023
The dismissed agents are recalled back to M.A.T.A with the current attendees; they are organized for a camping day off. Meanwhile, Alicia intercepts Kim over her suspicions of her behavioral changes.
37	11	"Mission: Vital (Misi: GETIR)"	14 January 2023
The Arena round reaches its final stage, and the only four agents who made it through: Ali, Alicia, Kim and Sam compete for the final round. Everyone is called to witness the performance, meanwhile Dos and Rizwan trail Dato' Hisham, only to discover he was phonically hypnotized, and someone 'else' is Cero.
38	12	"Mission: Sting (Misi: SENGAT)"	21 January 2023
Cinco, now even more powerful than before, returns to take revenge on MATA again, and systematically takes down over Arena; Kim finally reveals to be an inner mole and eventually both activate Override mode, Cinco tries to access the mainframe and wreak havoc and is successful.
39	13	"Mission: Champion (Misi: JAGUH)"	28 January 2023
In a flashback, a younger Kim prevents Jenny from leaving for a mission. Cinco overrides the M.A.T.A. mainframe, causing a power outage throughout Cyberaya, and breaks into the Arena. Kim hijacks the Arena’s Mechadroids with Ali and Alicia captured. Rizwan reactivates his Microbugs with Akram's controller while Nueve disables the mainframe, de-powering the Arena agents' gadgets. Cinco crashes a cargo aeroplane into the Arena as Ali's group escape. Kim stops Alicia from attacking Cinco who reveals that I.R.I.S. is separate from the mainframe. Cinco orders Kim to attack Alicia, though she refuses until Cinco threatens her with their initial goal to take over M.A.T.A. As Rizwan defeats Trez, Seis and Siete, Ali helps Kim defeat Cinco, who attempts to gouge Kim's eyes with Microbugs to prevent her from overriding; Cinco is ultimately killed by her own Microbugs after Ali destroys her transmitter. The Numeros threatening Hisham were arrested, though Cero releases Trez. Hisham returns Othman mayoral powers and Alicia wins the Arena competition, becoming the new wielder of I.R.I.S. after Kim is detained. Dayang and Ganz assign Ali to a secret project dubbed S.A.T.R.I.A.

== Movies ==
Title	Directed by	Written by	Original release date
Ejen Ali The Movie	Usamah Zaid Yasin	Usamah Zaid Yasin; Faqihin Mohd Fazlin; Shafiq Isa; Hilman Muhamad; Nazmi Yatim	November 28, 2019
Ejen Ali The Movie 2	Usamah Zaid Yasin	Usamah Zaid Yasin; Hilam Bin Muhammad Khairul; Anwar Suwandi	May 22, 2025
