= List of highest-grossing films in Malaysia =

The statistics on international films' Box Office in Malaysia has started in 2008. Box Office Mojo is the only website that provides the box office numbers for international films released in Malaysia. However, this does not include the numbers for local films. For top local films gross, please view Cinema of Malaysia. Box Office - Yahoo! Malaysia and Cinema Online Malaysia are two current websites that show the ranking of films weekly inclusive of local films, but not providing any box office number. Golden Screen Cinemas (GSC) also provide only the ranking of both local and international films weekly, based on the popularity at its own cinema. The ranking can be accessed at the right bottom corner of GSC's website.

== Highest-grossing films of all times ==
As of March 2025, Mat Kilau: Kebangkitan Pahlawan directed and written by Syamsul Yusof is currently the highest-grossing overall of all time in Malaysia.

Background colour indicates films that are currently in cinema

Rank	Title	Directed By	Gross (RM)	Year	Country
1	Mat Kilau: Kebangkitan Pahlawan	Syamsul Yusof	97,420,000	2022	Malaysia
2	Avengers: Endgame	Anthony Russo; Joseph Russo	87,544,600	2019	United States
3	Spider-Man: Brand New Day	Destin Daniel Cretton	84,212,000	2026	United States
4	Blood Brothers: Bara Naga	Syafiq Yusof; Abhilash Chandra	76,000,000	2025	Malaysia
5	Avengers: Infinity War	Anthony Russo; Joseph Russo	71,498,800	2018	United States
6	Papa Zola The Movie: Game On	Nizam Razak	68,200,000	2025	Malaysia
7	Spider-Man: No Way Home	Jon Watts	64,215,370	2021	United States
8	Sheriff: Narko Integriti	Syafiq Yusof	64,000,000	2024	Malaysia
9	Furious 7	James Wan	60,659,547	2015	United States
10	Ejen Ali The Movie 2 : Misi SATRIA	Usamah Zaid Yasin	59,300,000	2025	Malaysia
11	Jumanji: The Next Level	Jake Kasdan	55,669,712	2019	United States
12	Avatar: The Way of Water	James Cameron	54,131,411	2022	United States
13	Polis EVO 3	Syafiq Yusof	54,110,000	2023	Malaysia
14	Jumanji: Welcome to the Jungle	Jake Kasdan	54,089,433	2023	United States
15	Jurassic World: Fallen Kingdom	J. A. Bayona	53,795,100	2018	United States
16	Ne Zha 2	Jiao Zi	52,155,136	2025	China
17	The Fate of the Furious	F. Gary Gray	52,052,497	2017	United States
18	Avengers: Age of Ultron	Joss Whedon	51,190,838	2015	United States
19	Munafik 2	Syamsul Yusof	48,740,000	2018	Malaysia
20	Jurassic World	Colin Trevorrow	48,511,938	2015	United States
21	Doctor Strange in the Multiverse of Madness	Sam Raimi	47,313,076	2022	United States
22	Captain Marvel	Anna Boden; Ryan Fleck	45,541,800	2019	United States
23	Iron Man 3	Shane Black	45,268,519	2013	United States
24	Transformers: Age of Extinction	Michael Bay	44,081,548	2014	United States
25	Jurassic World: Dominion	Colin Trevorrow	43,381,100	2022	United States
26	Captain America: Civil War	Anthony Russo; Joe Russo	43,381,100	2016	United States
27	Black Panther	Ryan Coogler	42,306,000	2018	United States
28	Aquaman	James Wan	39,617,200	2018	United States
29	Frozen II	Chris Buck; Jennifer Lee	38,553,062	2019	United States
30	Ip Man 4: The Finale	Wilson Yip	36,767,006	2020	Hong Kong; China
31	Hantu Kak Limah	Mamat Khalid	36,231,126	2018	Malaysia
32	Mechamato Movie	Nizam Razak	35,878,232	2022	Malaysia
33	The Lion King (2019)	Jon Favreau	35,000,000	2019	United States

== Highest-grossing local films in Malaysia ==
Below is the list of top 50 highest-grossing local films ever in Malaysia.

As of May 2025, Mat Kilau directed and written by Syamsul Yusof is currently the highest-grossing local film of all time in Malaysia.

Background shading indicates films playing in the week commencing 19 November 2026 in theaters around the world.

Rank	Title	Directed By	Gross (RM)	Year
1	Mat Kilau : Kebangkitan Pahlawan	Syamsul Yusof	97,420,000	2022
2	Blood Brothers: Bara Naga	Syafiq Yusof; Abhilash Chandra	76,000,000	2025
3	Papa Zola The Movie: Game On	Nizam Razak	68,200,000	2025
4	Sheriff: Narko Integriti	Syafiq Yusof	64,000,000	2024
5	Ejen Ali The Movie 2: Misi SATRIA	Usamah Zaid Yasin	59,300,000	2025
6	Polis EVO 3	Syafiq Yusof	54,110,000	2023
7	Munafik 2	Syamsul Yusof	48,000,000	2018
8	Hantu Kak Limah	Mamat Khalid	36,400,000	2018
9	Mechamato Movie	Nizam Razak	35,880,000	2022
10	MALBATT: Misi Bakara	Adrian Teh	32,500,000	2023
11	Ejen Ali The Movie: Misi Neo	Usamah Zaid Yasin	32,500,000	2019
12	Air Force The Movie: Selagi Bernyawa	Zulkarnain Azhar; Frank See	30,600,000	2022
13	PASKAL	Adrian Teh	30,080,000	2018
14	BoBoiBoy Movie 2	Nizam Razak	30,000,000	2019
15	Upin & Ipin: Keris Siamang Tunggal	Ahmad Razuri Roseli; Adam Amiruddin; Syed Nurfaiz Khalid Syed Ibrahim	26,200,000	2019
16	Takluk: Lahad Datu	Zulkarnain Azhar	26,000,000	2024
17	Abang Long Fadil 3	Syafiq Yusof	25,000,000	2022
18	Tarung: Unforgiven	Razaisyam Rashid	23,300,000	2026
19	Polis EVO 2	Joel Soh; Andre Chiew	22,450,000	2018
20	Kudrat 1968: High Council	Zulaikha Zakaria	20,000,000	2026
21	BoBoiBoy: The Movie	Nizam Razak	20,000,000	2016
22	Chelot	Adrian Teh	19,500,000	2026
23	Munafik	Syamsul Yusof	19,040,000	2016
24	Abang Long Fadil 2	Syafiq Yusof	18,150,000	2017
25	Polis Evo	Ghaz Abu Bakar	17,740,000	2015
26	The Journey	Chiu Keng Guan	17,170,000	2014
27	Ola Bola	Chiu Keng Guan	16,670,000	2016
28	Polong	Zulkarnain Azhar	15,000,000	2026
29	Ah Beng vs Liang Po Po	Matt Lai	14,500,000	2026
30	Libang Libu	Bobby Husaini	14,100,000	2026
31	Malaikat Malam	Nazifdin Nasrudin	14,000,000	2026
32	Pusaka	Razaisyam Rashid	13,700,000	2019
33	Close Ur Kopitiam	Vince Chong 老章	13,300,000	2025
34	Kahar: Kapla High Council	Razaisyam Rashid	13,000,000	2024
35	KL Special Force	Syafiq Yusof	12,220,000	2018
36	Malam Terlarang	Nurhanisham Muhammad	12,000,000	2025
37	Sangkar	Kabir Bhatia	12,000,000	2019
38	KL Gangster	Syamsul Yusof	11,740,000	2011
39	The Experts	Andre Chiew; Nazim Shah	11,160,483	2024
40	Ombak Rindu	Osman Ali	10,900,000	2011
41	Dukun	Dain Said	10,000,000	2018
42	Money Games	Matt Lai	9,850,000	2025
43	Misteri Dilaila	Syafiq Yusof	9,440,000	2019
44	Hantu Bonceng	Ahmad Idham	8,540,000	2011
45	Dongeng Sang Kancil	Ahmad Razuri Roseli; Nik Ahmad Rasyidi Nik Othman	8,300,000	2024
46	Ngangkung	Ismail Bob Hashim	8,180,000	2010
47	Didi & Friends The Movie - Legenda Muzika	Akmal Aziz Asmawi; Roshfaizal Ariffin	8,144,421	2023
48	Kongsi	Farid Kamil	8,090,000	2011
49	Khurafat: Perjanjian Syaitan	Syamsul Yusof	8,080,000	2010
50	Banduan	Kroll Azry	8,000,000	2025

== Highest-grossing international films in Malaysia ==
Below is the list of top 50 highest-grossing international films ever in Malaysia.

- Note: All grosses are based on the final week of the film in local theatres and taken in estimation of local currency, as different rates between USD and Ringgit of Malaysia applied every week.

Background colour indicates films that are currently in cinema

=== List of highest grossing international films ===
Rank	Title	Gross (RM)	Year
1	Avengers: Endgame	87,544,600	2019
2	Spider-Man: Brand New Day	84,212,000	2026
3	Avengers: Infinity War	71,498,800	2018
4	Spider-Man: No Way Home	64,215,370	2021
5	Furious 7	60,659,547	2015
6	Jumanji: The Next Level	55,669,712	2019
7	Avatar: The Way of Water	54,131,411	2022
8	Jumanji: Welcome to the Jungle	54,089,433	2017
9	Jurassic World: Fallen Kingdom	53,795,100	2018
10	Ne Zha 2	52,155,136	2025
11	The Fate of the Furious	52,052,497	2017
12	Avengers: Age of Ultron	51,190,838	2015
13	Jurassic World	48,511,938	2015
14	Doctor Strange in the Multiverse of Madness	47,313,076	2022
15	Captain Marvel	45,541,800	2019
16	Iron Man 3	45,268,519	2013
17	Transformers: Age of Extinction	44,081,548	2014
18	Captain America: Civil War	43,381,100	2016
19	Jurassic World: Dominion	43,263,807	2022
20	Black Panther	42,306,000	2018
21	The Greatest of All Time	42,000,000	2024
22	Ponniyin Selvan: I	40,700,000	2022
23	Aquaman	39,617,200	2018
24	Frozen 2	38,553,062	2019

^{^} Transformers: Dark of the Moon grossed RM34,661,020 but due to the exchange rates, United International Pictures claimed that the film banked in a total of RM37,252,441.

^^ Note 2: Including the total gross of the re-release of the special edition.

- Note 3: Films that are currently running in theatres nationwide.

=== Highest opening weekend films in history ===
Below is the list of the 30 biggest opening weekend of all time in Malaysia. As of 4 August 2019, Avengers: Endgame has the biggest opening weekend of all time in Malaysia, grossing RM 41,835,999 in the opening weekend alone and surpassed RM 10,000,000 on the opening day itself

- As of 3 August 2026

Rank	Film	Gross (RM)	Year
1	Avengers: Endgame	41,848,500	2019
2	Avengers: Infinity War	34,893,000	2018
3	Spider-Man: Brand New Day	30,000,000	2026
4	The Fate of the Furious	27,583,484	2017
5	Doctor Strange in the Multiverse of Madness	26,982,263	2022
6	Furious 7	26,623,534^	2015
7	Captain Marvel	23,165,500	2019
8	Jurassic World: Dominion	23,015,518	2022
9	Transformers: Age of Extinction	21,421,683	2014
10	Captain America: Civil War	19,890,000 (estimate)	2016
11	Black Panther	19,609,600	2018
12	Avengers: Age of Ultron	19,351,790^^	2015
13	Jumanji: The Next Level	19,027,545	2019
14	Fast X	17,907,726	2023
15	Transformers: Rise of the Beasts	17,618,609	2023
16	Batman v Superman: Dawn of Justice	16,500,000 (estimate)	2016
17	Fast & Furious Presents: Hobbs & Shaw	16,164,451	2019
18	Jurassic World: Fallen Kingdom	15,488,600	2018
19	Spider-Man: Far From Home	15,305,400	2019
20	Spider-Man: Homecoming	15,103,803	2017
21	The Amazing Spider-Man 2	14,947,576	2014
22	Thor: Ragnarok	14,829,752	2017
23	Transformers: Dark of the Moon	14,799,941^^^	2011
24	Iron Man 3	14,263,206^^^	2013
25	Fast & Furious 6	13,310,553	2013
26	Avatar: The Way of Water	13,266,558	2022
27	Transformers: The Last Knight	13,192,793	2017
28	Frozen 2	12,893,225	2019
29	Ant-Man and the Wasp	12,582,900	2018
30	Deadpool	12,390,814	2016

^ Note 1: Furious 7 grossed RM20,769,458 on its opening weekend from Thursday to Sunday. However, if include sneak previews from 9pm onward on Wednesday, it opened to a total of RM26,623,534.

^^ Note 2: Avengers: Age of Ultron grossed RM17,876,018 on its opening weekend from Thursday to Sunday. If include sneak previews from Wednesday midnight onward, it opened to RM19,351,790.

^^^ Note 3: Iron Man 3 was considered to have higher opening weekend as it was a 3-day opening weekend compared to Transformers: Dark of the Moon 4-day opening weekend. The list ranks the films according to the total gross of opening weekend regardless of total days of opening weekend.

== Highest-grossing Chinese films in Malaysia ==
Background colour indicates films that are currently in cinema

Rank	Title	Chinese	Release year	Language	Gross revenue (Malaysian ringgit)
1	Ne Zha 2	哪吒之魔童闹海	2025	Mandarin	52,155,136
2	Ip Man 4: The Finale	葉問4: 完結篇	2020	Cantonese	36,767,006
3	Kung Fu Yoga	功夫瑜伽	2017	Mandarin	29,623,280
4	The Mermaid	美人鱼	2016	Mandarin	29,221,707
5	Ip Man 3	葉問3	2015	Cantonese	29,017,792
6	Dear You	给阿嬷的情书	2026	Teochew	20,600,000
7	Money No Enough 3	钱不够用3	2024	Mandarin	20,475,839
8	No More Bets	孤注一掷	2023	Mandarin	20,046,703
9	CZ12	十二生肖	2012	Mandarin	18,035,919
10	The Last Dance	破·地獄	2024	Cantonese	17,800,000

== Highest-grossing Indian films in Malaysia ==
Rank	Title	Title in original languages	Release year	Gross revenue (Malaysian ringgit)	Ref
1	Dilwale	दिलवाले	2015	15,680,000	
2	Jailer 2	சிறைக்காவலர் 2	2026	15,250,000	
3	The Greatest of All Time	தி கிரேட்டஸ்ட் ஆஃப் ஆல் டைம்	2024	15,150,000	
4	Jailer	சிறைக்காவலர்	2023	14,192,961	
5	Leo	லியோ	2023	13,252,400	
6	Bigil	பிகில்	2019	12,680,000	
7	Kabali	கபாலி	2016	12,580,000	
8	Karuppu	Karuppu	2026	12,500,000	
9	Mersal	மெர்சல்	2017	11,820,000	
10	Varisu	வரிசு	2023	11,600,000	
11	Ponniyin Selvan: I	பொன்னியின் செல்வன் 1	2022	11,520,000	
12	Jana Nayagan	ஜன நாயகன்	2026	11,350,000	
13	Vikram	விக்ரம்	2022	10,970,000	
14	K.G.F: Chapter 2	ಕೆ.ಜಿ.ಎಫ್: ಚಾಪ್ಟರ್ ೨	2022	10,150,000	
15	Enthiran	எந்திரன்	2010	9,770,000	
16	Ponniyin Selvan: II	பொன்னியின் செல்வன் 2	2023	8,992,936	
17	Sarkar	சர்கார்	2018	8,900,000	
18	Sivaji	சிவாஜி	2007	8,528,800	
19	2.0			8,310,000	
20	Vedalam	வேதாளம்	2015	8,020,000	

== Highest-grossing animated films in Malaysia ==
Below is the list of highest-grossing animated films ever in top 50 of Malaysia. Papa Zola The Movie is currently the highest-grossing animated film in Malaysia.

Background colour indicates films that are currently in cinema

Rank	Title	Gross (RM)	Year	Country
1	Papa Zola The Movie: Game On	68,200,000	2025	Malaysia
2	Ejen Ali The Movie 2 : Misi SATRIA	59,300,000	2025	Malaysia
3	Ne Zha 2	52,155,136	2025	China
4	Frozen 2	38,553,062	2019	United States
5	Mechamato Movie	35,880,000	2022	Malaysia
6	Ejen Ali The Movie : Misi Neo	32,500,000	2019	Malaysia
7	Zootopia 2	30,433,000	2025	United States
8	BoBoiBoy Movie 2	30,000,000	2019	Malaysia
9	Minions: The Rise of Gru	28,881,000	2022	United States
10	Demon Slayer: Infinity Castle	28,229,494	2025	Japan
11	Upin & Ipin: Keris Siamang Tunggal	26,200,000	2019	Malaysia
12	Incredibles 2	21,100,000	2018	United States
13	Big Hero 6	20,900,566	2014	United States
14	BoBoiBoy: The Movie	20,100,000	2016	Malaysia
15	How to Train Your Dragon: The Hidden World	20,000,000	2019	United States
16	The Super Mario Bros. Movie	18,193,374	2023	United States
17	Kung Fu Panda 2	18,048,666	2011	United States
18	Kung Fu Panda 4	17,918,020	2024	United States
19	Inside Out 2	16,995,822	2024	United States
20	Despicable Me 4	16,683,835	2024	United States
21	Frozen	15,147,740	2013	United States
22	Kung Fu Panda 3	14,831,021	2016	United States
23	Moana 2	14,280,000	2024	United States
24	The Angry Birds Movie	13,860,924	2016	United States; Finland
25	Toy Story 4	10,823,662	2019	United States
26	Suzume	9,290,949	2023	Japan
27	Madagascar: Escape 2 Africa	9,200,000	2008	United States
28	Kung Fu Panda	9,100,000	2008	United States
29	Hotel Transylvania 3: Summer Vacation	8,615,648	2018	United States
30	Dongeng Sang Kancil	8,300,000	2024	Malaysia
31	Didi & Friends The Movie - Legenda Muzika	8,144,421	2023	Malaysia
32	Rise of the Guardians	7,855,399	2012	United States
33	Rio	7,845,221	2011	United States
34	One Piece Film Red	7,700,000	2022	Japan
35	The Garfield Movie	7,004,250	2024	United States
36	Geng: The Adventure Begins	6,314,526	2009	Malaysia
37	The Angry Birds Movie 2	5,403,438	2019	United States; Finland
38	Puss in Boots: The Last Wish	5,400,000	2022	United States
39	Up	5,191,794	2009	United States
40	Demon Slayer: Mugen Train	5,000,000	2021	Japan
41	The First Slam Dunk	4,840,000	2023	Japan
42	Jujutsu Kaisen 0	4,680,000	2022	Japan
43	Spider-Man: Across the Spider-Verse	4,580,000	2023	United States
44	Ribbit	4,000,000	2014	Malaysia
45	Ne Zha	3,600,000	2019	China
46	One Piece: Stampede	3,000,000	2019	Japan
47	Zootopia	2,772,697	2016	United States
48	Weathering with You	2,700,000	2019	Japan
49	SeeFood	2,360,000	2011	Malaysia
50	Sing 2	2,200,000	2022	United States

== Year to year international films box office in Malaysia ==
For list of highest-grossing local production films in history: Highest-grossing local production films.

The historical box office record in Malaysia was made by Furious 7 in April 2015, which held the 4-day opening record of RM26,623,534 and the highest-grossing film of RM60,659,547. In 2012, while The Avengers broke the best Friday opening day gross of all time, it was unable to break Transformers: Dark of the Moon 4-day weekend opening record gross, making RM10,050,983 from 26 to 29 April 2012. On 28 April 2014, Iron Man 3 broke a new 3-day opening record by grossing RM14,263,206. The film later surpassed Transformers: Dark of the Moon to be the highest-grossing film of all time, earning a gross of RM45,268,519 until Furious 7 took the crown after becoming the first film to gross over RM50 million. Transformers: Dark of the Moon was the first film to break US$10 million in Malaysia - $10,881,761. The film was retained in the cinema for 15 weeks.

=== Year 2007 ===
Transformers grossed more than $5 million in cinemas. It was retained in cinemas for a total of 14 weeks.

Rank	Release date	Film title	Gross (RM)
1	28 Jun	Transformers	16,651,000
2	1 May	Spider-Man 3	15,398,800
3	24 May	Pirates of the Caribbean: At World's End	12,444,300
4	15 Jul	Ghost Rider	8,720,420
5	9 Aug	Rush Hour 3	8,113,060
6	15 Jun	Sivaji	7,574,460
7	27 Dec	Aliens vs. Predator: Requiem	7,451,510
8	12 Jul	Harry Potter and the Order of the Phoenix	7,377,420
9	22 Mar	Mr. Bean's Holiday	6,993,870
10	20 Dec	National Treasure: Book of Secrets	6,936,120

- Note: Total gross are retrieved based on estimation from Box Office Mojo.

==== Tamil Movies ====
Rank	Release date	Film	Gross ($USD)
1	15 Jun	Sivaji	2,435,416
2	8 Nov	Vel	868,850
3	8 Nov	Azhagiya Tamil Magan	756,334
4	14 Dec	Billa	742,059
5	12 Jan	Pokkiri	650,000
6	14 Apr	Unnale Unnale	250,905
7	28 Sep	Malaikottai	173,125
8	7 Sep	Marudhamalai	123,609
9	20 Jul	Kireedam	103,521
10	10 Aug	Arya	91,389

=== Year 2008 ===
The top film in Malaysia for year 2008 was CJ7 Cheung Gong 7 Hou which grossed RM11,715,385. This was the only year when a non-Hollywood movie became the highest-grossing film in Malaysia.

Rank	Release date	Film title	Gross (RM)
1	7 Feb	CJ7	11,715,385
2	6 Nov	Quantum of Solace	11,496,806
3	31 Jul	The Mummy: Tomb of the Dragon Emperor	11,388,032
4	30 Apr	Iron Man	11,226,006
5	17 Jul	The Dark Knight	9,350,711
6	22 May	Indiana Jones and the Kingdom of the Crystal Skull	9,174,836
7	13 Nov	Madagascar: Escape 2 Africa	9,125,635
8	6 Jun	Kung Fu Panda	9,030,498
9	15 May	The Chronicles of Narnia: Prince Caspian	8,954,936
10	17 Apr	The Forbidden Kingdom	8,642,787

==== Chinese Movies ====
Rank	Film	Gross ($USD)
1	CJ7	3,695,033
2	The Forbidden Kingdom	2,662,783
3	Kung Fu Dunk	1,858,974
4	Ip Man	1,448,373
5	Ah Long Pte Ltd	1,378,946
6	Money No Enough 2	1,342,065
7	Three Kingdoms: Resurrection of the Dragon	670,030
8	Red Cliff: Part 1	645,025
9	Painted Skin	626,440
10	Long Tor Tai	520,711

==== Tamil Movies ====
Rank	Release date	Film	Gross ($USD)
1	12 Jun	Dasavatharam	1,721,109
2	13 Nov	Vaaranam Aayiram	796,297
3	1 May	Kuruvi	754,201
4	31 Jul	Kuselan	569,967
5	23 Oct	Aegan	486,419
6	17 Jan	Bheema	483,854
7	31 Jan	Indiralohathil Na Azhagappan	451,753
8	28 Aug	Dhaam Dhoom	347,297
9	14 Aug	Sathyam	266,702
10	30 Oct	Seval	247,934

=== Year 2009 ===
In 2009, Transformers: Revenge of the Fallen topped the box office, grossing RM28,154,004, which was a record in Malaysia box office. It was later surpassed by its own sequel, Transformers: Dark of the Moon in 2011.

Rank	Release date	Film title	Studio	Gross (RM)
1	24 Jun	Transformers: Revenge of the Fallen	United International Pictures	28,154,004
2	17 Dec	Avatar	20th Century Fox	26,581,739
3	12 Nov	2012	Sony Pictures	25,317,483
4	28 May	Terminator Salvation	Sony Pictures	13,684,170
5	2 Apr	Fast & Furious	United International Pictures	10,474,751
6	21 May	Night at the Museum: Battle of the Smithsonian	20th Century Fox	10,089,399
7	6 Aug	G.I. Joe: The Rise of Cobra	United International Pictures	9,880,034
8	2 Jul	Ice Age: Dawn of the Dinosaurs	20th Century Fox	8,649,171
9	16 Jul	Harry Potter and the Half-Blood Prince	Warner Bros. Pictures	8,310,303
10	2 Jul	X-Men Origins: Wolverine	20th Century Fox	8,210,239

==== Chinese Movies ====
Rank	Film	Gross ($USD)
1	The Storm Warriors	1,891,453
2	All's Well, Ends Well 2009	1,655,109
3	Where Got Ghost?	1,515,577
4	Shinjuku Incident	1,112,234
5	Bodyguards and Assassins	997,751
6	Red Cliff	920,257
7	Love Matters	874,663
8	Haeundae	847,853
9	The Wedding Game	829,474
10	The Treasure Hunter	741,811

==== Tamil Movies ====
Rank	Release date	Film	Gross ($USD)
1	15 Oct	Aadhavan	1,456,618
2	17 Dec	Vettaikaaran	1,329,618
3	20 Aug	Kanthaswamy	1,077,658
4	2 Apr	Ayan	1,046,027
5	15 Jan	Villu	639,236
6	5 Feb	Naan Kadavul	380,756
7	15 Oct	Peraanmai	194,835
8	14 May	Sarvam	116,299
9	28 May	Thoranai	103,480
10	5 Mar	1977	66,013

=== Year 2010 ===
In year 2010, the top film was Avatar, which made RM26,159,953 including RM1,123,320 of its 3D-reissued on 25 August 2010. Not counting the re-released version, the original film was one of the film that was retained the most longest in cinema, for a total of 29 weeks.

Rank	Release date	Film title	Studio	Gross (RM)
1	29 Apr	Iron Man 2	United International Pictures	15,176,953
2	10 June	The Karate Kid	Sony Pictures	13,460,360
3	9 Dec	The Chronicles of Narnia: The Voyage of the Dawn Treader	20th Century Fox	12,734,700
4	1 Apr	Clash of the Titans	Warner Bros. Pictures	12,502,677
5	27 May	Prince of Persia: The Sands of Time	Walt Disney Pictures	12,283,284
6	1 Oct	Enthiran	Sun Pictures	12,268,732
7	4 March	Alice in Wonderland	Walt Disney Pictures	11,562,895
8	29 Apr	Ip Man 2	Golden Screen Cinemas	11,414,916
9	10 Sep	Resident Evil: Afterlife	Sony Pictures	11,061,721
10	18 Nov	Harry Potter and the Deathly Hallows – Part 1	Warner Bros. Pictures	10,943,856

==== Chinese Movies ====
Rank	Film	Gross ($USD)
1	Ip Man 2	3,488,158
2	Legend of the Fist: The Return of Chen Zhen	2,049,033
3	72 Tenants of Prosperity	1,885,887
4	Little Big Soldier	1,512,361
5	The Child's Eye	1,487,116
6	All's Well, Ends Well	1,172,656
7	14 Blades	1,007,827
8	Yuet Gwong Bo Hup	910,000
9	Detective Dee and the Mystery of the Phantom Flame	887,808
10	The Legend Is Born – Ip Man	873,806

==== Tamil Movies ====
Rank	Release date	Film	Gross ($USD)
1	30 Sep	Enthiran	3,048,246
2	27 May	Singam	1,471,508
3	17 Jun	Raavanan	906,396
4	23 Dec	Manmadan Ambu	653,942
5	14 Jan	Aayirathil Oruvan	443,008
6	1 Apr	Paiyaa	434,202
7	4 Feb	Asal	377,228
8	29 Apr	Sura	297,497
9	22 Jul	Thillalangadi	318,633
10	19 Aug	Naan Mahaan Alla	302,309

=== Year 2011 ===
The highest-grossing film was Transformers: Dark of the Moon that made RM34,661,020, which was one of the biggest record in Malaysia's film industry. It was also the only film that made over $10 million (USD) in 2011 and in Malaysia's Box Office history. Followed by this were Kung Fu Panda 2 and Mission: Impossible – Ghost Protocol grossing RM18,048,666 and RM17,297,093 respectively. In 2012, The Avengers became the second film after Transformers: Dark of the Moon to earn more than $10 million (USD) in Malaysia's Box Office.

Rank	Release date	Film title	Studio	Gross (RM)	Note
1	30 Jun	Transformers: Dark of the Moon	United International Pictures	34,661,020*	Transformers: Dark of the Moon opened at RM14,799,941 for its first 4 days opening weekend and became the top opening weekend gross film for 2011 in Malaysia. It was also the top-grossing film of the year.
2	26 May	Kung Fu Panda 2	United International Pictures	18,048,666	Kung Fu Panda 2 is the highest-grossing animated film in Malaysia for the year 2011. It doubled the box office of Kung Fu Panda back in 2008.
3	15 Dec	Mission: Impossible – Ghost Protocol	United International Pictures	17,297,093	
4	19 May	Pirates of the Caribbean: On Stranger Tides	Walt Disney Pictures	16,566,061	
5	5 May	Fast Five	United International Pictures	16,535,815	
6	15 Sep	Johnny English Reborn	United International Pictures	16,430,754	
7	13 Oct	Real Steel	Walt Disney Pictures	15,112,861	
8	14 Jul	Harry Potter and the Deathly Hallows – Part 2	Warner Bros. Pictures	13,681,954	
9	18 Apr	Thor	United International Pictures	11,198,842	Actual ranking including local film KL Gangster put Thor at number 10, which grossed US$4,321,809 (13,804,200).
10	2 Jun	X-Men: First Class	20th Century Fox	10,628,635	

- Note: The final actual grossing of Transformers: Dark of the Moon was RM 37,252,441 (claimed by United International Pictures Malaysia), but the number was adjusted at week 14 release of the film due to difference in currency exchange, leading to official number of RM 34,661,020 stated in Box Office Mojo. Including local film KL Gangster which grossed about RM 12,978,352, it should be ranking #9 just above Thor.

==== Chinese Movies ====
Rank	Film	Language	Gross ($USD)
1	All's Well, Ends Well 2011 (Hong Kong)	Cantonese	2,307,095
2	I Love Hong Kong (Hong Kong)	Cantonese	2,237,346
3	Shaolin (film) (Hong Kong)	Cantonese	2,207,445
4	The Sorcerer and the White Snake (Hong Kong)	Mandarin	1,336,639
5	The Lost Bladesman (Hong Kong)	Cantonese	1,335,682
6	The Ghosts Must Be Crazy (Singapore)	Mandarin, Hokkien, English, Tamil and Malay	1,141,073
7	San Kei Hap Lui (China)	Mandarin	1,128,343
8	Wu Xia/Dragon (China)	Mandarin	843,606
9	A Chinese Ghost Story (China and Hong Kong)	Mandarin	764,210
10	Wo Zhi Nu Run Xin		590,315

==== Tamil Movies ====
Rank	Release date	Film	Gross ($USD)
1	25 Oct	7 Aum Arivu	1,104,911
2	1 Sep	Mankatha	1,068,841
3	15 Jan	Kaavalan	733,169
4	13 Jan	Siruthai	552,074
5	16 Jun	Avan Ivan	528,597
6	23 Dec	Rajapattai	370,550
7	25 Nov	Mayakkam Enna	339,603
8	21 Apr	Ko	281,481
9	7 Jul	Venghai	191,088
10	14 Jul	Deiva Thirumagal	104,740

=== Year 2012 ===
In 2012, the top film was The Avengers which grossed RM33,983,208, followed by The Amazing Spider-Man, grossing RM21,993,313. On 8 July, The Amazing Spider-Man surpassed The Avengers (RM10,050,983) to score the best opening weekend this year with RM10,107,973. However, The Avengers still scored the biggest Friday's single opening day gross of the year. Both are still unable to top Transformers: Dark of the Moon with advance ticketing sales and more addition of midnight shows. The Avengers was retained in cinema for 15 weeks. On 22 July, The Dark Knight Rises opened to RM6,972,371, which is more than double the debut of The Dark Knight, RM3,249,930 back in 2008. The Dark Knight Rises was the second film retained the longest in cinema for 17 weeks while Madagascar 3: Europe's Most Wanted was the animated film retained the longest in cinema for 24 weeks in 2012.

Rank	Release date	Film title	Studio	Gross (RM)	Note
1	27 Apr	The Avengers	Walt Disney Pictures	33,983,028	The Avengers scored the second-best Friday's opening day in 2012 and became the top 4-day opening weekend gross for the year 2012 until it is surpassed by The Amazing Spider-Man. It is the second-best opening of all time in Malaysia for the films released by Walt Disney Pictures until the record was taken over by other MCU films. In second week, The Avengers dropped by just 25.6%, grossing RM7,410,498 and became the highest-grossing film in 2012. At week 4 release in Malaysia, it became the second film to surpass US$10 million in Malaysia. It was retained in cinema for 15 weeks.
2	5 July	The Amazing Spider-Man	Sony Pictures Entertainment	21,993,313	Scored the highest opening weekend in 2012 surpassing The Avengers, The Amazing Spider-Man is the 2nd-highest-grossing film in Malaysia for the year 2012.
3	1 Nov	Skyfall	Sony Pictures	20,325,814	Skyfall opened at RM7,595,365 during its first weekend to claim the third-highest opening weekend in 2012. Skyfall's overall gross surpassed Quantum of Solace's total gross of RM11,496,806. It was also the third film of the year to surpass RM20 million.
4	20 Dec	CZ12	Golden Screen Cinemas	20,278,439	The first ever Chinese film to top the box office at #1 for three consecutive weeks.
5	12 April	Battleship	United International Pictures	19,999,042	Battleship opened at RM7,394,405 for its first 4 days opening weekend and became the fourth-highest opening weekend gross film for 2012.
6	19 Jul	The Dark Knight Rises	Warner Bros. Pictures	17,477,430	The Dark Knight Rises opened at RM6,972,371, which doubled the opening weekend gross of its predecessor back in 2008. The opening weekend gross was already 66% of overall gross of The Dark Knight. Using the currency rates in 2012, box office of The Dark Knight Rises is 60% ahead of The Dark Knight, while 65% if using the currency rates in 2008. It was retained at IMAX theatre for 8 weeks, which was the longest record for any other films. As for normal halls, it was retained for 17 weeks, behind Madagascar 3: Europe's Most Wanted's 24 weeks record.
7	24 May	Men in Black 3	Sony Pictures	16,055,988	
8	16 Aug	The Expendables 2	N/A	15,128,364	The Expendables doubled The Expendables total gross of RM6,518,821 back in 2010.
9	13 Dec	The Hobbit: An Unexpected Journey	Warner Bros. Pictures	15,100,342	No box office record of The Lord of the Rings trilogy so no comparison could be done with The Hobbit: An Unexpected Journey. It could be assumed that with 10 years of inflation, the latter grossed more than any of the trilogy.
10	19 Jan	Journey 2: The Mysterious Island	Warner Bros. Pictures	13,568,921	Journey 2: The Mysterious Island tripled the overall gross of Journey to the Center of the Earth back in 2008.

==== Chinese Movies ====
Rank	Film	Gross ($USD)
1	CZ12	6,533,781
2	Cold War	2,144,883
3	I Love Hong Kong 2012	1,869,065
4	The Viral Factor	1,798,028
5	All's Well, Ends Well	1,549,033
6	We Not Naughty	1,294,814
7	The Wedding Diary	1,258,537
8	Motorway	766,200
9	Ah Boys to Men	663,015
10	Fierce Wife: Final Episode	576,920

==== Tamil Movies ====
Rank	Release date	Film	Gross ($USD)
1	13 Nov	Thuppakki	1,732,792
2	12 Oct	Maattrraan	1,124,812
3	13 Jul	Billa II	947,634
4	12 Jan	Nanban	872,498
5	13 Nov	Podaa Podi	482,864
6	12 Jan	Vettai	431,769
7	14 Dec	Neethaane En Ponvasantham	429,264

=== Year 2013 ===
Both CZ12 and The Hobbit: An Unexpected Journey continued their strength from last year holiday weekend to dominate the box office for several weeks consecutively. Heading into January, CZ12 broke record by becoming the second-highest-grossing Chinese film in Malaysia, earning RM20,278,439. It is also the Jackie Chan's highest-grossing film in local box office. Meanwhile, The Hobbit: An Unexpected Journey had grossed RM15,100,342. It was basically higher than The Lord of the Rings Trilogy. The top film of the year in Malaysia was Iron Man 3, grossing RM45,268,519. It had officially become the first film ever to gross over RM40 million. This was followed by Fast & Furious 6 which grossed a total of RM31,462,780. On 26 April, Iron Man 3 broke the highest opening day record previously held by The Avengers. It also opened to RM14,263,206, which was the highest opening record for 3 days opening after advance ticketing showed a strong selling out. On 4 July, Despicable Me 2 broke the highest opening weekend record for an animated film which was previously held by Kung Fu Panda 2. The minion comedy opened to RM5,596,983 even after a strong RM1,098,734 limited sneak previews from its previous weekend, which was higher than Kung Fu Panda 2's RM5,025,339 back in 2011. Meanwhile, directed by Malaysian director James Wan, The Conjuring is the highest-grossing horror film ever in Malaysia with RM11,800,000 until it was later surpassed by its own spin-off Annabelle in 2014.

Rank	Release date	Film title	Studio	Gross (RM)	Note
1	26 Apr	Iron Man 3	Walt Disney Pictures	45,268,519	Scored the best 3 days opening record of RM14,243,206 million, the second-highest opening weekend in comparison with gross, and the highest opening day surpassing The Avengers. * During its second weekend of release, it dropped only 42.3% and the cume had reached RM33,248,398, which was higher than Transformers: Dark of the Moon second weekend grossing of RM26,443,250. On 19 May, Iron Man 3 surpassed Transformers: Dark of the Moon to become the highest-grossing film ever in Malaysia until the record was shattered by Furious 7. The film was retained in cinema for 15 weeks.
2	23 May	Fast & Furious 6	United International Pictures	31,462,780	Scored the second-highest opening weekend in 2013 with a total of RM13,310,553. It was also the third film of the year to surpass RM 20 million and the fourth film to cross RM30 million.
3	31 Oct	Thor: The Dark World	Walt Disney Pictures	29,541,110	The sequel opened to a strong RM11,460,528 on its first weekend, scoring the third-highest opening weekend of the year. It was also the third-highest-grossing film of the year, and grossed nearly 2.5 times higher than Thor (RM11,198,842) back in 2011.
4	28 Mar	G.I. Joe: Retaliation	United International Pictures	21,695,792	Became the fourth-best opening weekend of the year and it was the first film in 2013 to break RM 20 million.
5	13 June	Man of Steel	Warner Bros. Pictures	20,653,640	Opened to RM9,882,898 which was higher than The Dark Knight Rises's opening weekend of RM6,972,371. It was the highest opening weekend film ever for Warner Brothers in Malaysia and the fourth-highest opening weekend film of the year until all records were taken by its sequel Batman v Superman: Dawn of Justice.
6	12 Dec	The Hobbit: The Desolation of Smaug	Warner Bros. Pictures	17,926,377	Smaug opened to a strong RM7,200,077, about a 34% increase over The Hobbit: An Unexpected Journey in 2012. On second weekend, Smaug dropped 60.1%, which was steeper than Journey's 52.3% last year. However, it was still 28.1% ahead of its predecessor at the same time frame which grossed RM10,125,911.
7	20 June	World War Z	United International Pictures	16,654,256	
8	11 July	Pacific Rim	Warner Bros. Pictures	16,005,340	
9	4 July	Despicable Me 2	United International Pictures	15,737,168	Despicable Me 2 breaks the highest opening weekend record ever for any animation by grossing RM5,596,983. With the increasing popularity of Minions, the sequel has already grossed four times higher than its predecessor Despicable Me's RM3,757,206 back in 2010.
10	25 July	The Wolverine	20th Century Fox	12,083,818	

Note: By comparing opening gross, Transformers: Dark of the Moon still hold the best opening weekend with RM 14.8 million while Iron Man 3 trailed behind with RM 13.8 million. However, with inflation and IMAX boost, Iron Man 3 could be considered scoring the best opening weekend since it had already grossed RM 13.8 million in just 3 days. The opening record for Transformers: Dark of the Moon was a 4 days opening record. All of the records were later surpassed by Transformers: Age of Extinction, Furious 7 and Avengers: Age of Ultron. Meanwhile, in terms of US dollar, Hansel and Gretel: Witch Hunters grossed less than Oz: The Great and Powerful.

==== Chinese Movies ====
Rank	Film	Gross ($USD)
1	Journey to the West: Conquering the Demons	3,192,253
2	Hotel Deluxe	2,191,991
3	I Love Hong Kong	1,824,376
4	The Wedding Diary 2	1,374,560
5	Ah Boys To Men - Part 2	1,150,585
6	Saving General Yang	1,039,709
7	Princess and the Seven Kung Fu Masters	930,716
8	Taxi! Taxi!	899,697
9	Ip Man: The Final Fight	728,764
10	The Tower	697,493

==== Tamil Movies ====
Rank	Release date	Film	Gross ($USD)
1	25 Jan	Vishwaroopam	1,789,629
2	5 July	Singam II	1,780,490
3	1 Nov	Arrambam	1,287,486
4	9 Aug	Thalaivaa	738,363
5	20 Dec	Biriyani	683,609
6	6 Sep	Varuthapadatha Valibar Sangam	539,369
7	1 Nov	All in All Azhagu Raja	499,034
8	22 Nov	Irandam Ulagam	421,122
9	1 May	Ethir Neechal	406,486
10	18 Jul	Maryan	326,902

=== Year 2014 ===
Transformers: Age of Extinction is the highest-grossing film of the year with a stunning gross of RM44,081,548. The robots adventure broke all of its predecessors' opening records, earning RM21,421,683 on its first weekend of release. The total gross of box office on that weekend was RM22,800,872, marking the biggest opening weekend of the year in local box office and has once again proven how popular is Transformers franchise here. It is followed by The Amazing Spider-Man 2 with a tremendous gross of RM29,893,163. It scored the second-best opening weekend of the year, shattering the previous record held by Transformers: Dark of the Moon, grossing RM14,947,576, which was also a significant improvement over The Amazing Spider-Man's opening weekend of RM10,107,973. In third, Captain America: The Winter Soldier grossed a total of RM27,083,626, which was three times bigger than Captain America: The First Avenger back in 2011.

Rank	Release date	Film title	Studio	Gross (RM)	Note
1	26 June	Transformers: Age of Extinction	United International Pictures	44,081,548	The autobots continued to show its popularity and strength by shattering all of the opening and total gross records of the previous three installments. It opened to RM21,421,683, the first film ever to open over RM20 million and a record of RM97,816 per screen average. To compare, the box office sales of the movie was 72 percent more than Avatar, 55 percent more than Captain America: The Winter Soldier, 52 percent more than Thor: The Dark World and 27 percent more than The Avengers. In comparison, it grossed 60% bigger than Transformers, 33% bigger than Transformers: Revenge of the Fallen and 12% more than Transformers: Dark of the Moon. It is the highest-grossing film of 2014.
2	1 May	The Amazing Spider-Man 2	Sony Pictures	29,893,163	It opened at RM14,947,576, which was the second-highest opening weekend in 2014 surpassing Transformers: Dark of the Moon. On its second weekend, it dropped a steep 62.6% and 75.2% in second and third weekend as compared to its predecessor's 50.1% and 72.6%, suggesting that it was much more front loaded. With opening of nearly RM14.95 million, it was a disappointing run considering it closed RM15 million behind Iron Man 3 but it was still overall an increase of 37% from The Amazing Spider-Man back in 2012.
3	27 March	Captain America: The Winter Soldier	Walt Disney Pictures	27,083,626	The sequel grossed 3 times bigger than Captain America: The First Avenger and it opened to RM11,650,329 which was the third-highest opening weekend in 2014.
4	18 Dec	The Hobbit: The Battle of the Five Armies	Warner Bros. Pictures	24,123,320	The highest-grossing entry in The Hobbit film series and the only middle earth installment that grosses RM20 million and above.
5	25 Dec	Night at the Museum: Secret of the Tomb	20th Century Fox	22,436,465	
6	13 Nov	Big Hero 6	Walt Disney Pictures	22,300,566	The highest-grossing animation in Malaysia.
7	22 May	X-Men: Days of Future Past	20th Century Fox	21,110,400	It doubled the opening weekend of X-Men: First Class in 2011, grossing a total of RM9,967,602 during its opening weekend. It also improved significantly from its predecessor which grossed a total of RM10,628,635.
8	29 May	Maleficent	Walt Disney Pictures	20,529,879	The highest-grossing fairy tale film released by Disney, bigger than all the installments of Pirates of the Caribbean.
9	30 Jan	Robocop	Sony Pictures	19,292,658	The first film of the year to gross over RM10 million. It was #1 for two consecutive weeks but was surpassed by local production The Journey on its third week of release.
10	15 May	Godzilla	Warner Bros. Pictures	19,286,434	Scoring the fourth-best opening weekend in 2014 and grossed more than Emmerich's Godzilla in 1998.
11	31 Jul	Guardians of the Galaxy	Walt Disney Pictures	19,000,633	Guardians are not a well-known superheroes franchise locally, but its opening weekend of RM8,787,173 which was the sixth-largest of the year, considered impressive thanks to the branding of The Avengers.
12	11 Sep	The Maze Runner	20th Century Fox	18,796,654	
13	2 Oct	Annabelle	Warner Bros. Pictures	17,699,207	Annabelle opened to RM7,957,820 on its opening weekend after the success of The Conjuring in 2013.
14	7 Aug	Teenage Mutant Ninja Turtles	United International Pictures	17,232,925	
15	30 Jan	The Journey	Astro Shaw	17,160,000	On 23 Feb, local Chinese production The Journey has become the highest-grossing local film ever in Malaysia's box office, grossing a RM12.92 million, not only beating Robocop on that weekend, but also surpassing the record previously held by KL Gangster's RM11.74 million. The film has grossed a total of RM17.16 million. The records were then refurnished by other local productions - Munafik and Polis Evo but it still remains as the highest-grossing local Chinese film.

==== Tamil Movies ====
Rank	Release date	Film	Gross ($USD)
1	22 Oct	Kaththi	2,748,382
2	11 Dec	Lingaa	1,673,983
3	15 Aug	Anjaan	1,190,388
4	18 Jul	Velaiilla Pattadhari	1,153,188
5	22 May	Kochadaiiyaan	855,591
6	9 Jan	Jilla	855,591
7	10 Jan	Veeram	818,391
8	4 Apr	Maan Karate	818,391
9	19 Sep	Aranmanai	738,852
10	22 Oct	Poojai	669,593

=== Year 2015 ===
The three top films were Furious 7, Avengers: Age of Ultron and Jurassic World with each grossing above RM40 million for a combination total of RM160 million. Furious 7 surprised local box office by its outstanding performance, breaking all of the records held by Transformers and The Avengers franchise. It opened to RM20,769,458 on its opening weekend and RM26,623,534, if inclusive of sneak previews beginning at 9pm on Wednesday. It is the highest-grossing film of the year with a shocking RM60,659,547, marking the first film to fly pass RM50 million in local box office history. Avengers: Age of Ultron followed at #2, its opening weekend of RM17,816,018 was the second-highest opening weekend of the year and nearly doubled of The Avengers's opening weekend back in 2012. Coming in third is Jurassic World with a RM48,511,938.

Rank	Release date	Film title	Studio	Gross (RM)	Note
1	2 Apr	Furious 7	United International Pictures	60,659,547	Furious 7 opened to RM20,769,458 on its opening weekend, beating the previous record holder Transformers: Age of Extinction. On its second week, it dropped 50.4%, grossing a total of RM47,392,755 which had already surpassed the overall gross of Fast & Furious 6 and Iron Man 3. It was the first film to gross over RM50 million and the only film to gross over RM60 million in local box office history.
2	23 Apr	Avengers: Age of Ultron	Walt Disney Pictures	51,190,838	It doubled the opening weekend of Avengers (RM10,050,983) and it already earned more than double the total gross of its predecessor. It was the second film to earn over RM50 million together with Furious 7.
3	11 Jun	Jurassic World	United International Pictures	48,511,938	
4	16 Jul	Ant-Man	Walt Disney Pictures	29,639,008	
5	17 Dec	Star Wars: The Force Awakens	Walt Disney Pictures	27,529,999	
6	24 Dec	Ip Man 3	Fivestar Pictures	27,206,291	The highest-grossing foreign Chinese film and the highest-grossing entry in the Ip Man film series. Overtaken by Ip Man 4 in 2019.
7	28 May	San Andreas	Warner Bros. Pictures	25,508,810	
8	30 Jul	Mission: Impossible – Rogue Nation	United International Pictures	25,124,472	
9	10 Sep	Maze Runner: The Scorch Trials	20th Century Fox	23,505,517	
10	5 Nov	Spectre	Sony Pictures	22,194,776	

==== Tamil Movies ====
Rank	Release date	Film	Gross ($USD)
1	14 Jan	I	2,058,439
2	10 Nov	Vedalam	1,857,422
3	17 Apr	Kanchana 2	1,586,048
4	29 May	Massu Engira Masilamani	1,462,385
5	5 Feb	Yennai Arindhaal	1,265,894
6	10 Oct	Puli	1,109,602
7	16 July	Maari	1,018,748
8	27 Feb	Kaaki Sattai	931,132
9	12 Feb	Anegan	855,338
10	9 July	Baahubali: The Beginning	839,584

=== Year 2016 ===
- As of 26 January 2019.

Rank	Release date	Film title	Studio	Gross (RM)	Note
1	28 Apr	Captain America: Civil War	Walt Disney Pictures	43,381,100	
2	24 Mar	Batman v Superman: Dawn of Justice	Warner Bros. Pictures	30,450,300	
3	11 Feb	The Mermaid	Sony Pictures	28,214,290	
4	27 Oct	Doctor Strange	Walt Disney Pictures	24,195,400	
5	7 Apr	The Jungle Book	Walt Disney Pictures	23,081,100	
6	11 Feb	Deadpool	20th Century Fox	21,842,600	
7	4 Feb	From Vegas to Macau III	Golden Screen Cinemas	16,005,200	
8	15 Dec	Rogue One: A Star Wars Story	Walt Disney Pictures	15,068,200	
9	29 Dec	The Great Wall	20th Century Fox	14,714,500	
10	10 Mar	Kung Fu Panda 3	20th Century Fox	14,407,000	

==== Tamil Movies ====
Rank	Release date	Film	Gross ($USD)
1	22 Jul	Kabali	3,100,960
2	14 Apr	Theri	1,487,985
3	9 Sep	Iru Mugan	1,197,226
4	6 May	24	1,127,259
5	29 Jan	Aranmanai 2	1,078,789
6	7 Oct	Remo	990,433
7	14 Jan	Rajini Murugan	855,591
8	27 Oct	Kodi	624,954
9	28 Oct	Kaashmora	513,097
10	7 July	Dhilluku Dhuddu	483,595

=== Year 2017 ===
- As of 21 January 2018.

Rank	Release date	Film title	Studio	Gross (RM)	Note
1	21 Dec	Jumanji: Welcome To The Jungle	Sony Pictures	54,089,433	
2	13 Apr	The Fate of the Furious	United International Pictures	52,052,497	
3	22 Jun	Transformers: The Last Knight	United International Pictures	34,363,646	
4	26 Oct	Thor: Ragnarok	Walt Disney Pictures	32,473,652	
5	6 Jul	Spider-Man: Homecoming	Sony Pictures	28,692,862	
6	30 Mar	Beauty and the Beast	Walt Disney Pictures	23,713,812	
7	8 Jun	The Mummy	United International Pictures	23,457,101	
8	27 Apr	Guardians of the Galaxy Vol. 2	Walt Disney Pictures	22,855,494	
9	25 May	Pirates of the Caribbean: Salazar's Revenge	Walt Disney Pictures	20,614,402	
10	26 Jan	xXx: The Return of Xander Cage	United International Pictures	20,372,356	

==== Tamil Movies ====
Rank	Release date	Film	Gross ($USD)
1	18 Oct	Mersal	2,796,920
2	28 Apr	Baahubali 2: The Conclusion (Tamil Only)	1,764,380
3	24 Aug	Vivegam	1,434,520
4	9 Feb	Si3	1,380,820
5	14 Jan	Bairavaa	1,169,864
6	9 Mar	Velaikkaran	1,158,350
7	11 Aug	Velaiilla Pattadhari 2	941,166
8	14 Apr	Shivalinga	670,539
9	2 Feb	Bogan	452,224
10	21 Jul	Vikram Vedha	422,820

=== Year 2018 ===
- As of 26 January 2019.

Rank	Release date	Film title	Studio	Gross (RM)	Note
1	25 Apr	Avengers: Infinity War	Walt Disney Pictures	71,498,800	
2	7 June	Jurassic World: Fallen Kingdom	United International Pictures	53,795,100	
3	14 Feb	Black Panther	Walt Disney Pictures	42,306,000	
4	13 Dec	Aquaman	Warner Bros. Pictures	39,617,200	
5	4 Oct	Venom	Sony Pictures	28,902,100	
6	20 Dec	Bumblebee	Paramount Pictures	28,510,900	
7	22 March	Pacific Rim: Uprising	United International Pictures	26,876,700	
8	26 July	Mission: Impossible – Fallout	Paramount Pictures	26,047,100	
9	4 July	Ant-Man and the Wasp	Walt Disney Pictures	23,563,100	
10	14 June	Incredibles 2	Walt Disney Pictures	21,775,600	

==== Tamil Movies ====
Rank	Release date	Film	Gross ($USD)
1	29 Nov	2.0	4,076,820
2	6 Nov	Sarkar	2,136,350
3	6 Jun	Kaala	1,674,186
4	12 Jan	Thaanaa Serndha Koottam	896,514
5	11 May	Irumbu Thirai	473,199
6	22 Jun	Tik Tik Tik	432,048
7	26 Jan	Bhaagamathie	388,843
8	13 Jul	Kadaikutty Singam	295,682
9	2 Feb	Oru Nalla Naal Paathu Solren	223,772
10	9 Feb	Kalakalappu 2	189,564

=== Year 2019 ===
- As of 22 December 2019 for Hollywood films and February 2020 for Chinese films

Rank	Release date	Film title	Studio	Gross (RM)	Note
1	24 Apr	Avengers: Endgame	Walt Disney Pictures	86,999,400	Avengers: Endgame is the highest-grossing movie of all time in Malaysia and had a record-breaking opening weekend of RM 41,848,500
2	5 Dec	Jumanji: The Next Level	Sony Pictures	55, 669,712	
3	6 Mar	Captain Marvel	Walt Disney Pictures	45,541,800	
4	21 Nov	Frozen 2	Walt Disney Pictures	41,000,000	Frozen II is the highest-grossing animated film in Malaysia based on Box Office Mojo
5	20 Dec	Ip Man 4	Lotus Five Star	37,000,000	Ip Man 4 is the highest grossing Chinese film in Malaysia based on local media reports
6	1 Aug	Hobbs & Shaw	United International Pictures	34,766,700	
7	3 Jul	Spider-Man: Far From Home	Sony Pictures	32,121,600	
8	17 Oct	Maleficent: Mistress of Evil	Walt Disney Pictures	31,540,800	
9	19 Jul	The Lion King	Walt Disney Pictures	25,659,100	
10	23 May	Aladdin	Walt Disney Pictures	23,003,500	

==== Tamil Movies ====
Rank	Release date	Film	Gross ($USD)
1	25 Oct	Bigil	3,550,000
2	10 Jan	Petta	2,250,000
3	10 Jan	Viswasam	1,497,455
4	10 Aug	Nerkonda paarvai	1,169,864

=== Year 2020 ===
Figures provided are from Box Office Mojo and supplemented from local reports. Due to the COVID-19 pandemic affecting globally since the early 2020s, cinemas were forced to be shut down multiple times and it massively affected box office in Malaysia as well as around the world. During days where cinemas were allowed to operate strict restrictions and regulations were placed. (As of 27 December 2022)

Rank	Release date	Film title	Studio	Gross (RM)	Note
1	23 Jan	Enter the Fat Dragon	Golden Screen Cinemas	12,150,000	
2	23 Jan	Birds of Prey	Warner Bros. Pictures	10,085,072	
3	23 Jan	Dolittle	United International Pictures	9,079,237	
4	23 Jan	Bad Boys for Life	Sony Pictures	8,255,467	
5	13 Feb	Sonic the Hedgehog	Paramount Pictures	7,162,022	
6	4 Sep	Mulan	Walt Disney Pictures	6,239,180	
7	9 Jan	Underwater	Walt Disney Pictures	4,869,769	
8	5 Mar	The Invisible Man	Sony Pictures	4,374,146	
9	27 Feb	Fantasy Island	Sony Pictures	2,921,974	
19	2 Jan	The Grudge	Sony Pictures	2,514,517	

=== Year 2021 ===
All figures provided are from Box Office Mojo. (As of 27 December 2022)

Rank	Release date	Film title	Studio	Gross (RM)	Note
1	16 Dec	Spider-Man: No Way Home	Sony Pictures	64,215,370	
2	25 Mar	Godzilla vs. Kong	Warner Bros. Pictures	19,479,150	
3	4 Nov	Eternals	Walt Disney Pictures	11,193,862	
4	7 Oct	Shang-Chi and the Legend of the Ten Rings	Walt Disney Pictures	7,980,572	
5	30 Dec	The King's Man	Walt Disney Pictures	6,148,703	
6	8 Apr	Mortal Kombat	Walt Disney Pictures	3,546,114	
7	30 Dec	Sing 2	Walt Disney Pictures	2,406,706	
8	5 Mar	Raya and the Last Dragon	Walt Disney Pictures	2,294,797	
9	21 Oct	F9: The Fast Saga	United International Pictures	1,850,003	
10	23 Sep	Black Widow	Walt Disney Pictures	1,032,918	

=== Year 2022 ===
All figures provided are from Box Office Mojo. (As of 5 May 2023)

Rank	Release date	Film title	Studio	Gross (RM)	Note
1	15 Dec	Avatar: The Way of Water	Walt Disney Pictures	54,131,411	
2	4 May	Doctor Strange in the Multiverse of Madness	Walt Disney Pictures	47,313,076	
3	9 Jun	Jurassic World: Dominion	United International Pictures	43,263,807	
4	10 Nov	Black Panther: Wakanda Forever	Walt Disney Pictures	33,360,138	
5	26 May	Top Gun: Maverick	Paramount Pictures	31,018,743	Estimated amount
6	30 Jun	Minions: The Rise of Gru	United International Pictures	30,342,021	
7	20 Oct	Black Adam	Warner Bros. Pictures	25,874,400	
8	21 Apr	Sonic the Hedgehog 2	Paramount Pictures	7,134,036	
9	22 Dec	Puss in Boots: The Last Wish	Universal Pictures	5,933,590	
10	29 Sep	Smile	Paramount Pictures	5,004,903	

=== Year 2023 ===
All figures provided are from Box Office Mojo and supplemented by local reports. (As of 24 June 2024)

Rank	Release date	Film title	Studio	Gross (RM)	Note
1	18 May	Fast X	Universal Pictures	36,771,880	
2	8 Jun	Transformers: Rise of the Beasts	Paramount Pictures	35,536,097	
3	21 Dec	Aquaman and the Lost Kingdom	Warner Bros. Pictures	30,000,000 (estimated)	
4	3 August	Meg 2: The Trench	Warner Bros. Pictures	22,023,000	
5	16 Feb	Ant-Man and the Wasp: Quantumania	Walt Disney Pictures	21,466,005	
6	13 July	Mission: Impossible – Dead Reckoning Part One	Paramount Pictures	20,137,304 (estimated)	
7	5 May	Guardians of the Galaxy Vol. 3	Walt Disney Pictures	19,771,663	
8	20 Apr	The Super Mario Bros. Movie	Universal Pictures	18,201,010	
8	20 July	Barbie	Warner Bros. Pictures	16,915,178	
9	23 Mar	John Wick: Chapter 4	Lionsgate	16,226,519	
10	20 Apr	Evil Dead Rise	Warner Bros. Pictures	15,581,340	

== See also ==
- List of films released in Malaysia
- Cinema of Malaysia
