= Ngangkung =

- Film poster
- Directed by: Ismail Bob Hashim
- Written by: Abban Lo'baw
- Screenplay by: Ismail Bob Hashim
- Produced by: David Teo
- Starring: Shaheizy Sam; Angah Raja Lawak; Azad Jasmin; Eira Syazira; Putri Mardiana; Lan Pet Pet
- Cinematography: Indra Che Muda
- Edited by: Brian Ng
- Music by: Brian Ng
- Production company: Metrowealth Pictures
- Distributed by: MIG Pictures
- Release date: 25 November 2010
- Running time: 82 minutes
- Country: Malaysia
- Language: Malay
- Budget: MYR 1.65 million
- Box office: MYR 8.18 million

Ngangkung is 2010 Malaysian Malay-language horror comedy film directed by Ismail Bob Hashim. The film was released theatrically in Malaysia on 25 November 2010. The film stars Shaheizy Sam, Angah Raja Lawak, and Azad Jasmin telling a story centers on three friends who are stuck gambling on lottery. It is one of the highest grossing films of Malaysian cinema.

== Plot ==
Ngangkung is the act of summoning spirits by a bomoh so as to obtain winning lottery numbers. This may be done by bringing things for the worship to the bomoh, and these items may be hard to find such as old kris, old coins and so on. The film tells of Azim, a driver who lives in a suburban village with his wife Suri and his daughter. Azim has two good friends, Tasnim and Wan. Tasnim and Wan are heavily involved in gambling on the lottery and their activities are known to their wives.

Azim, who had never previously thought about his friends' activities, is persuaded to become involved in gambling through their pressure and perseverance. Tasnim has a success with the lottery number which result in a change of his lifestyle. Initially Azim goes with his friends just to observe their activity, but he then starts to enjoy more and more going gambling with Tasnim and Wan without his wife Suri's knowledge. They tried to find various ways and various shamans to get the lottery numbers they want, and in the process encountered a number of strange and funny events. Azim's life took a more serious turn when his obsession in getting lottery numbers resulted in his neglect of the family. Likewise for Tasnim and Wan. One day an event happens that really changes their lives to dissuade them from continuing to engage in this activity.

== Cast ==
- Shaheizy Sam as Azim
- Azad Jasmin as Tasnim
- Angah Raja Lawak as Wan
- Putri Mardiana as Midah
- Eira Syazira as Suri
- Echa as Wahi
- Azlee Jaafar as Dr. Atha
- Ruzaidi Abdul Rahman as Shaman
- Yana Samsudin as patient
- Lan Pet Pet as fighter
- Kamarool Haji Yusoff as Selendang Shaman
- Delimawati as Wan's Mom
- Effa Nareesha as Wan's Wife
- Lan Zailan as Pengemis Pantai
- Jesse Lim as drifter
- Hamdan Ramli as Kuali shaman

== Production ==
Ngangkung is the 42nd film made by Metrowealth Pictures, and cost RM1.65 million. Filming started in January 2010 around Kuala Selangor. It is the first film directed by Ismail Bob Hashim whose previous experience was in directing television drama. The film was produced by David Teo.

== Reception ==
=== Box office ===
The movie "Ngangkung" succeeded in creating history in the Malaysian film industry when it became the first local film whose total collection reached RM8 million in all local cinemas, by reporting total collection of RM8.15 million in five-week impressions (as of December 23, 2010). It took the highest first-week box office in Malay film history with RM3.7 million, reaching RM7.8 million in just 20 days, breaking the Adnan Sempit record that earned RM7.7 million in about a month, as List of highest-grossing films in Malaysia.

=== Critical reception ===
Cinema Online rated the film 3 out of 5 stars, with the reviewer noting that there were "no laugh-out-loud moments in "Ngangkung" but giggles are sporadic and gets even more sparse towards the final third where it turns so much darker and more serious". MStar however considers it a good comedy film that is fun to enjoy.
