= Ejen Ali =

Malaysian spy-fiction animated series

- Genre: Action; Adventure; Spy-fi
- Created by: Usamah Zaid Yasin
- Showrunners: Usamah Zaid Yasin; Faiz Hanafiah; Shafiq Isa; Nazmi Yatim; Fuad Md Din
- Screenplay by: Usamah Zaid Yasin; Waleed Shareef; Nur'Ain Nabilah; Faqihin Mohd Fazlin; Shafiq Isa; Khai Suwandi; Aliya Nazlan; Adam Amiruddin; Hilman Muhamad
- Story by: Usamah Zaid Yasin; Ahmad Izham Omar; Mohd Faiz Hanafiah; Nazmi Yatim; Fuad Md Din; Shafiq Isa; Andi Abdul Ghani; Ghazali Omar; Fikri Zainal
- Directed by: Usamah Zaid Yasin
- Creative directors: Nazmi Yatim; Shafiq Isa; Adam Amiruddin
- Voices of: Ida Rahayu Yusoff; Noorhayati Maslini Omar; Shafiq Isa; Azman Zulkiply; Azuan Wanji Shamsir; Nurul Radhiah Ibrahim; Megat Zahrin Megat Hisham; Usamah Zaid Yasin
- Opening theme: Ejen Ali Intro
- Ending theme: Ejen Ali Ending
- Composers: Azri Yunus; Hakim Kamal
- Country of origin: Malaysia
- Original language: Malay
- No. of seasons: 3
- No. of episodes: 39 (list of episodes)

Production
- Executive producers: Usamah Zaid Yasin; Ahmad Izham Omar; Khairul Anwar Salleh; Nini Yusof
- Producers: Faiz Hanafiah; Aziemah Azman; Andrea Lok
- Editors: Usamah Zaid Yasin; Nazmi Yatim; Andi Abdul Ghani 1984-2025; Reuben Singham
- Running time: 21 minutes
- Production companies: WAU Animation; The Walt Disney Company (Southeast Asia) Pte. Ltd. (Note: Season 3 only)

Original release
- Network: TV3 (2016–2018, 2023–present); Disney+ Hotstar (2022–2023)
- Release: 8 April 2016 – 28 January 2023

Ejen Ali (Jawi: ايجن علي, lit. 'Agent Ali') is a Malaysian animation series produced by WAU Animation. The titular character is a young 12-year-old boy named Ali who accidentally becomes a special agent after using the Infinity Retinal Intelligent System (IRIS), a device prototype created by the Meta Advance Tactical Agency (MATA). IRIS is controlled by neuro-signals, enabling the wearer to perform actions programmed by the computer. After the incident, Ali and his uncle, Bakar, cooperated in MATA missions.

The series is published in HDTV format and was first broadcast on TV3 on 8 April 2016. Ejen Ali is the first animation series IP and franchises published and owned by Media Prima Berhad (MPB).

== Background ==
=== Setting ===
Based in Cyberaya, a fictional city inspired by the real city of Cyberjaya, Selangor. The series revolves around Meta Advance Tactical Agency (MATA), a paramilitary, Pinkerton-style spy agency, made up of four company-sized units known as pillars.

== Production ==
Director and scriptwriter Usamah Zaid Yasin came up with the idea for the series after establishing WAU Animation in 2013. For the storyline, he and his team watched films and animated series and read novels about spies and intelligence agencies. Making Ejen Ali took two years before the production work started in July 2015. Regarding his title choice, Usamah said that Ali is a simple name and frequently used in textbooks. After some initial difficulty choosing a simple name, Ali was chosen. Unlike most animated TV series in Malaysia, the end credits of the series were written in English instead of Malay, as was done with BoBoiBoy.

Wau Animation initially intended for Ejen Ali to be released as a feature film, but due to difficulties securing investment and after receiving feedback from other parties, they felt that it would be a loss if they only produced a single movie for such a broad concept. They planned to develop the series for at least five seasons, with films to follow. The first movie was finally released after two seasons on 28 November 2019.

== Characters ==
=== Main ===
Ali bin Ghazali
Voiced by: Ida Rahayu Yusoff (Malay); McKenzie Atwood (season 3) (English)
The titular character and protagonist, a lazy, school-going boy with a lack of complete maternal love for his only best friend, Victor. He lives with his father Dr. Ghazali, a tech prodigy from Cyberaya. In seasons 1 and 2, and the movie, Ali's primary gadget is the "Infinity Retinal Intelligent System" or "I.R.I.S.", which he accidentally wielded while being struck into pursuit by Dos. Since the gadget had scanned Ali's iris for the first time, it was permanently conjoined with his optical biometric interference. He used I.R.I.S. until he unlocked its hidden "override mode", which performed on higher capabilities but would keep Ali unconscious during the time. Ali would make a device mirroring the original, named IRIS Atlas, which evolved to become IRIS Neo. Due to its defects and his collaboration with Niki, he was officially separated from the original gadget. His other devices included his yo-yo (gives an impacted blast), aero boots (for boosts like hovering and high jumping), and a magnetic suit, introduced in season 3. He was temporarily transferred to the Kombat pillar in the eighth episode of the third season. In the season 3 finale, Ali was assigned as the new operator of SATRIA armor.

Bakar
Voiced by: Shafiq Isa (Malay); Bill Butts (season 3) (English)
Bakar is Ali's uncle, a combat M.A.T.A agent and a younger brother to Ali's late mother Aliya. He has a tough body and is excellent at fighting. He is always caring for Ali. He usually fights physically and wears gauntlets that can activate a plasma shield to defend himself from enemy attacks. Bakar was framed as the "enemy's spy" when a CCTV camera showed him sending the data of the I.R.I.S. blueprint to the enemies. However, Ali finds out that Bakar's brain was controlled after receiving a strange phone call from Dr. Aaron/Nueve, causing him to do so. In season 2, he became a mentor in the Combat Pillar.

Alicia Kheng
Voiced by: Noorhayati Maslini Omar (Malay); Lizzie Freeman (season 3) (English)
An adopted daughter of General Rama, she is a Chinese-Indian young agent from the Neuro Pillar and Ali's classmate. She is first introduced as the 'Masked Menace', who wears jet-black clothing and a full-face helmet and helps Ali defeat the enemies at the port. Alicia initially hates working in M.A.T.A. with Ali. Due to her egoism and Ali's stubbornness, they always fight, which makes them rivals. After Ali saved her from the Azurium explosion, she developed a more caring and friendly personality towards Ali. She can be quite hostile sometimes. After saving Ali from Uno and Jenny (Cinco), she is trying her best to protect I.R.I.S. from being taken by the enemies. Her weapon is a slingshot that is used to shoot various metal balls. Some deal damage, some function as smoke bombs, and some generate a magnetic field that attracts enemies within its vicinity. In the third season, she was given a bow and arrow set as a new signature weapon. She was temporarily an Inviso agent in the third season's eighth episode. At the conclusion of the third season, she becomes the new wielder of IRIS.

Comot
Voiced by: Ida Rahayu Yusoff (Malay); Kayli Mills (season 3) (English)
Ali's heterochromatic pet cat. Initially mistaken for Labu, Ali's previous cat, he ran away from home after the death of his mother. She used to work for Abang Bear and was requested to steal I.R.I.S., but she betrayed him because she didn't want to be abused anymore. As a subject of illegal transgenic pet experiments three years ago, she has the ability to camouflage. She had fought Kim after seeing her planting spy devices and transmitting the location outside. She was believed to have been killed by her, but she returns in episode 12.

=== Supporting ===
General Rama
Voiced by: Azman Zulkiply (Malay)
The fierce general of M.A.T.A. and Alicia's adoptive father. He always announces "Act immediately!", instructing the agents to immediately proceed to their assigned missions. A running gag in the series is that whenever the agents are being noisy in his presence, he screams "Dey!" that echoes throughout the room (Alicia would later mirror this at the M.A.T.A. Academy).

Rizwan
Voiced by: Azman Zulkiply (Malay); Johnny Yong Bosch (season 3) (English)
The greatest agent of the Inviso Pillar. He can disguise himself as someone else by putting on a cap. He is often seen with a lollipop in his mouth, so he always uses the lollipop stick as his final shot. His gloves can temporarily disable the enemies' nervous systems. In season 2, he betrayed M.A.T.A. and joined the Numeros, in a failed attempt to negotiate with M.A.T.A. to end their rivalry with Numeros. In season 3, he was being treated at Professor Akram's hideout to remove Azurium and nanobots implanted by Jenny (Cinco), and it was shown that he was immune to nanobots as almost all of them were removed from his bodies. He is now partnered with Dos and later Trez as vigilantes outside M.A.T.A.

Dos
Voiced by: Nurul Radhiah Ibrahim (Malay) (season 1), Azi Shafian (Malay) (season 2), Anne Yatco (season 3) (English)
A former member of Numeros. During her days at Numeros, she, together with her former partner Trez, broke into M.A.T.A.'s headquarters and stole I.R.I.S. Her weapon is a taser hair ornament that can electrocute her target and plasma blades that are capable of cutting through anything. She wears a pair of special boots that enable super speed and agility. She eventually joins Rizwan to assist in finding Cinco, who escaped in season 3.

Uno
Voiced by: Azuan Wanji Shamsir (Malay)
The previous leader of Numeros, with the main objective being to retrieve I.R.I.S. It was later revealed that he was the former leader of Inviso Pillar, whose real name was Djin, who was Rizwan's mentor and was rumoured to be killed in an Azurium explosion following their mission against terrorists, which nearly threatened to destroy Cyberaya. He feels betrayed by the other Pillar Leaders who neglected him five years ago, which led to his grudge against M.A.T.A. He is able to move at super speed and is very agile while fighting. His weapon is a plasma sword. In the finale episode of season 2, he was killed in the laser satellites explosion after overriding M.A.T.A. Academy's defense systems to destroy the place along with the agents, in which Zain also perished.

Trez
Voiced by: Megat Zahrin Megat Hisham (Malay)
A big-bodied former Numeros member with cybernetic arms that enables him to lift a load 10 times heavier than a normal human.

Cinco
Voiced by: Nor Meirysha Nurol Ashikin (Malay); Kimberly Woods (English)
Cinco's real name is Jenny Woo, and she was previously M.A.T.A's special inventor. She created weapons, suits, and devices for the M.A.T.A agents. As Jenny, she appears as a soft-spoken and gentle woman who always shows her concern towards the agents. She revealed herself to be the enemies' spy and never sided with M.A.T.A. as Cinco in the 12th episode of season 1 as she is responsible for the research in order to separate I.R.I.S from Ali. She is always seen holding a tablet with its pen, in which the pen functioned as a taser and communicator. In season 2, it was realized that every Numeros member (except Uno) was implanted with the special nanobots (similar to that being of Ocho) and she could control the neural system to make the victim work in her command. In season 3, it is revealed that she replaced Uno as Numeros' leader and underwent a bionic arm replacement of her left hand, which now possessed a sharp talon-like palm and nanobots hidden under her shoulder and arms. In season 3 at the start of episode 8, her back story revealed that she was an orphan when young, and she took Kim under her wings. In the conclusion episode of season 3, she was engulfed and killed by her own malfunctioning nanobots.

Seis and Siete
Voiced by: Iliyas Abdull Latif (Malay)
A pair of twins who share the same weapon, a football that produces high impact when it is kicked to the target. In the third episode of season 3, they were shown to work for Brother Bear.

Dr. Aaron Edison / Nueve
Voiced by: Adi Bahari (Malay)
A mad scientist who formerly worked under Alpha Tower and Dr. Tong. He is a mad scientist with the mission to advance humanity. Aaron invented the NeuroGear, a helmet that can control a human's mind, and his invention is rejected by Dr. Tong before he gets fired. He was imprisoned and created NeuroLink, in order to transfer the data of Dr. Tong's brain to his own brain. After being successfully defeated by Ali and his team, he was kidnapped by Dos and Trez, in which he later became a member of Numeros and invented the I.R.I.S Separator.

Jet
Voiced by: Mohammed Haziq Mohammed Hilmy (Malay); Christian Banas (season 3) (English)
A self-proclaimed young agent of the Neuro pillar who can fly with his weapon, a jetpack. He was eliminated from M.A.T.A. along with Bulat and Moon in season 3.

Moon
Voiced by: Ain Hafizah (Malay); Francesca Monet Calo (season 3) (English)
A cheerful and chatty young agent of the Inviso pillar. She is one of the young agents who is very friendly toward Ali. Moon can produce her own clones with her suits that can project holograph images of her. Her weapon is a pair of gloves that causes impact shocks to anything she touches. She was eliminated along with Bulat and Jet in season 3.

Iman
Voiced by: Salina Salmee Mohd Ali (Malay); Rogin Rashidan (season 3) (English)
A hijabi young agent from the Combat Pillar. She appears as a shy and highly-mannered girl but is very friendly towards Ali. Her weapon is a roped dart that flows from her shawl. She is a Combat agent, but she was temporarily an Inviso agent in season 3.

Khai
Voiced by: Khairul Anwar Suwandi (Malay); Khoi Dao (English)
A Japanese-Malay young agent of the Techno Pillar who befriends Ali at the academy. His weapon is his robotic hoverboard named R-O. He tends to chant "Naisu!" every time he is praising his friend's good works. Similar to Alicia, he can be quite hostile sometimes. He is temporarily a combat agent alongside Ali in season 3.

Rudy
Voiced by: Syahrul Matnizam (Malay); Aaron Phillips (English)
A cold-hearted and arrogant young agent of the Inviso Pillar. He holds deep hatred towards Ali after learning that Ali defeated Uno in the finale episode of season 1. Rudy always fights with Ali. Before becoming an M.A.T.A agent, he was a pickpocket who lived poorly in an alley. He idolized Djin (Uno) very much after he saved him from being tormented by Komeng. It is also revealed that he lost his family. He can control the movement of his target if he puts on a pair of metal wristbands on their wrists. Rudy is also capable of disguising as anyone he desires by putting on his disguising hoodie.

Mika
Voiced by: Shafiqah Zulkefli (Malay); Anjali Kunapaneni (season 3) (English)
A tomboyish young agent of the Combat Pillar. She is disabled on her legs, thus, she possesses a mecha suit as her weapon. It enables her to move around and shields herself from enemy attacks. Just like Alicia, she can be quite hostile sometimes. She was temporarily a neuro agent in season 3.

Roza
Voiced by: Syuhadah Hysham (Malay); Anne Yatco (English)
A Sarawakian young agent of the Neuro Pillar who bullied Ali at the academy. She is always seen chewing bubblegum. Her weapon is a sniper rifle that fires lasers. In season 3 episode 7, she was injured as she was saving a child from getting hit by a fallen planet in the science museum and in episode 8 she was eliminated.

Bulat
Voiced by: Muhammad Aqil (Malay); Anthony Sardinha (season 3) (English)
A chubby young agent of the Techno Pillar. His weapon is a rubix sphere that has different functions, depending on its combination such as creating explosions, a barrier and confetti. In season 3, he was eliminated along with jet and moon.

Zass
A mute young agent of the Inviso Pillar with the ability to run at super speed. He was eliminated in the third season's eighth episode.

Chris
Voiced by: Iqbal Mustaqim (Malay); Johnny Yong Bosch (English)
A white agent of the Combat pillar who speaks Kelantanese dialect. His weapons are plasma kris that are controlled with telekinesis. Chris fights with silat styles and chants.

Aleksander "Aleks" Zakariiev
Voiced by: Shafiq Isa (Malay); Harry Wood (English)
A big-bodied Inviso agent that can move with super speed by anti-gravity or stand rock firm on the ground using his special suit capable of manipulating gravity around the wearer. He was eliminated in episode 8. He refers to himself in third-person.

Rizka Widjaya
Voiced by: Azi Shafian (Malay); Tiana Camacho (English)
A hot-headed Kombat agent who speaks in Indonesian accent and possesses a pair of plasma karambit. She's a techno agent in season 3.

Samuel "Sam" Thompson Jr.
Voiced by: Hakim Kamal (Malay); Kyle McCarley (English)
A self-propelled and smart Neuro agent, who mocked the juniors, especially Ali. He possesses a military-grade Swiss watch that fires lasers, secretly spy on others and act as a communicator.

Kimberly "Kim" Song
Voiced by: Nur Atika Abdullah (Malay); Kayli Mills (English)
A cheerful and music-loving Techno agent whose weapon is a modified and upgraded keytar that emits sound waves of various effects. She is revealed to be working with her comrade and fellow orphan Cinco as a mole in the M.A.T.A Academy, planted one of her earrings in the computer in the Techno lab, planning to hack the defense system in the new M.A.T.A Academy.

Lily
An acrobatic, purple-dyed Kombat agent who wields Nunchaku as her weapon.

Leon
Voiced by: Muhammad Zulhilmi (Malay); Dino Andrade (Season 3) (English)
Leon is the mentor of Neuro Pillar and is the strictest of the four mentors.

Geetha
Voiced by: Azi Shafian (Malay); Shara Kirby (season 3) (English)
Geetha is the mentor of Techno Pillar. She is also known as the friendliest of the four mentor agents. However, she can also be more strict than Leon when there is a student who is not listening to her.

Karya
Voiced by: Usamah Zaid Yasin (Malay); Anthony Sardinha (season 3) (English)
Karya is the mentor of Inviso Pillar. Outside of M.A.T.A, he works as a teacher at Ali's school, under the name Cikgu Bidin, who 'chose' Ali as a member of the Stamp Collecting Club. He is capable of performing magic tricks and hypnosis.

Zain
Voiced by: Shafiq Isa (Malay); Usamah Zaid Yasin (Malay) (season 2 episode 8)
Zain is the leader of Neuro Pillar, who helped found M.A.T.A. When the other pillar leaders did not trust Ali after the Override Mode incident, he is the only one who trust him and guides Ali. He was also secretly mentoring Alicia & Ali. In the finale episode of season 2, it was reported that he was killed after he sacrifices himself in stopping Djin and his minions during the attack on M.A.T.A Academy.

Ganz
Voiced by: Shafiq Isa (Malay); Zeke Alton (Season 3)
Ganz is the leader of Combat Pillar. He is quick-tempered.

Dayang
Voiced by: Aina Nadzir (Malay); Rogin Rashidan (season 3) (English)
Dayang is the leader of Techno Pillar, and also one of Zain's closest associates, including recognition and training Ali's main potential at the Academy. She also recruited Ali's mother 15 years ago, after they investigated the raid on Cyberaya's main cargo bay and stopping them as well.

=== Other ===
Victor
Voiced by: Azman Zulkiply (Malay)
A classmate and best friend of Ali, who enjoys playing video games together with him. Unlike Ali, he is academically excellent and often ranked 2nd in the class.

Dr. Ghazali
Voiced by: Usamah Zaid Yasin (Malay); Harry Wood (English)
Father of Ali who is a technological prodigy.

Wak Musang
A nasi lemak seller who works under Abang Bear. In the first episode of season 1, he is shown to work with the Numeros, when he is responsible for temporarily keeping I.R.I.S for Uno.

Abang Bear
A weapons dealer who was behind the creation of Comot's 3 years ago who uses transgenic cats like her to rob money and gold for him. He speaks the Kelantanese dialect. In episode 4 of season 1, he planted a bomb in the warehouse to kill Ali, Alicia, and Bakar as he steals the I.R.I.S. saying he's selling it but Comot attacks him and takes it from him by biting his wrist. He tries to run after Comot but Komeng stops him saying the bomb was about to blow. Then he leaves with the other cats except for Comot.

Komeng
Commander of the Bear gang, who always seeks to steal high technological devices from C-Tech.

Analog Man
An old man who dislikes technology and plans to destroy Cyberaya. He said that advanced technologies caused the values of humanity to be forgotten. In the 10th episode of season 2, he was arrested but escaped with the help of some guys dressed as construction workers. He planned to bomb the bridge in Cyberaya but Ali, Alicia, Moon, and Bakar stopped him. But he planted a Bomb known as the mother bomb above the bridge to kill Ali and his team. Although they stopped the bomb from destroying the bridge. He escaped and his fate is unknown.

Ocho
Voiced by: Shafiq Isa (Malay)
Ocho is a robot who is the master of the microbugs. His movements and attacks using the microbugs are controlled by Cinco.

Puan Munah
Voiced by: Roshilawati Razlan (Malay)
The strict homeroom teacher of 6 Avicenna. She teaches Science, P.E. and Math subjects and is often seen holding a rattan whip. Although small-bodied, her scream could terrify her students.

Dr. Tong
A scientist in the biotechnology branch and former employer of Dr. Aaron. He became the victim of Dr. Aaron when the data of his brain is transferred into Dr. Aaron's brain.

Dr. Mala
A scientist in the energy engineering branch.

Aliya
Voiced by: Salina Salmee Mohd Ali (Malay); Shara Kirby (English)
Ali's mother and the older sister of Bakar. The original creator of the I.R.I.S., she helped Niki and her allies who lived in squalor at the outskirts of Cyberaya, creating inventions for their daily use and then started to loot their enemies' technology to reverse-engineer them. The turning point comes in her life when she and Niki tried to steal an artificial heart from a container shipping bay, only to be intervened by M.A.T.A.'s pillar leaders. Aliya tells Niki to escape with the heart and Dayang (after being impressed by the courage and inventions of Aliya) recruits her into M.A.T.A, with Niki feeling betrayed as a result. Aliya sacrifices herself to use the I.R.I.S Override Mode to destroy three missiles Niki sent against Cyberaya's government office, dying in the process.

Prof. Akram
Voiced by: Shafiq Isa (Malay); David Sobolov (English)
Originally Cuatro (4) of the Numeros, he lives alone in a small house located in a remote forest. He refused to work under Numeros as he does not want to trust Uno anymore. However, Cinco threatens him to work together with them or else the life of his family will be at stake.

Dato' Hisham
Voiced by: Usamah Zaid Yasin (Malay); Ryan Colt Levy (English)
A sporty and scientific researcher, who is the acting mayor of Cyberaya temporarily replacing Othman, after his powers were revoked temporarily for building his factory at outskirts illegally.

Julia
Voiced by: Sarah Azman (Malay); Francesca Monet Calo (season 3) (English)
The personal assistant of Dato' Hisham.

== Episodes ==
Series	Episodes		Originally released	
Series	Episodes		First released	Last released
1	13		8 April 2016	3 March 2017
2	13		22 September 2017	30 March 2018
Movie			November 28, 2019	
3	13	7	25 June 2022	6 August 2022
3	13	6	24 December 2022	28 January 2023
Movie			May 22, 2025	

== Broadcast ==
Aside from airing on TV3 in Malaysia, Ejen Ali can also be streamed on Iflix (Season 1 only) and Netflix (all 2 seasons) in an English dub.

Outside Malaysia, Ejen Ali has been expanded and shown across over 50 different countries worldwide. In June 2020, Primeworks Studios announced that Ejen Ali, along with 5 other animated series produced by Primeworks Studios, will stream on Amazon Prime in 6 different countries namely: the United States, Canada, the United Kingdom, Ireland, Australia and New Zealand, as part of their deal between the Primeworks Studios subsidiary, Primeworks Distribution and Janson Media.

In May 2021, Primeworks Studios and WAU Animations approached with The Walt Disney Company in dealing to stream the said series on Disney+ Hotstar. In October 2021, they confirmed its co-production, revealing that the series would launch by around late 2021 to early 2022.

=== Season 1 ===
The first episode was broadcast on 8 April 2016, with the second and third episodes shown on 15 April and 22 April respectively. It is shown every Friday, at 5:30 p.m. on TV3. Fourth, fifth and sixth episodes shown on 27 July, 29 July, and 5 August respectively. Seventh to ninth episodes are shown on 28 October 2016 for three consecutive weeks. Tenth to twelfth episodes are shown on 30 December 2016, 6 January and 13 January 2017. Thirteenth episode (last episode of Season 1) has been shown on 3 March.

An English dub of the show premiered 15 December 2017 on Disney Channel Asia and it was finished on 8 June 2018. It also aired on Nickelodeon Sonic in India in Hindi dub from 16 July 2018; however it was abruptly taken off the schedule nearly two weeks later due to low viewership. But on 5 November 2018, the new episodes were aired on Nick HD+ and the entire season was finished on 17 November 2018. it was aired till April 30 2020. From 15 April 2024 to 6 May 2024 it aired again on Super Hungama with a new dub.

=== Season 2 ===
The first episode of Season 2 was broadcast 22 September 2017, with episode two, three and four shown on 29 September. 6 October and 13 October respectively. Just like Season 1, It is shown every Friday, at 5:30 p.m. on TV3, Fifth, sixth, seventh, eighth episodes shown on 17 November, 24 November, 1 December and 8 December respectively. Episode nine to eleven aired from 9 February to 23 February 2018. The twelfth episode was released on 23 March 2018. The thirteenth episode (last episode of Season 2) was released on 30 March, making 26 episodes total.

An English dub for Season 2 premiered 15 April 2019 on Disney Channel Asia and it was finished on 1 January 2020. In India, it aired from 7 May 2024 to 28 May 2024 on Super Hungama in Hindi dub.

=== Season 3 ===
Due to the insistent demand after three years since the end of the second season, it was announced that a third season has been confirmed with undergoing productions of the new episodes, as well as the release of a new teaser music of opening theme. A small teaser trailer was released on 14 October 2021, and a poster released on 28 November 2021, while its official trailer was released on 10 June 2022. It was voted to be most popular local animated series on ABPBH 34.

It is co-produced with Disney+ Hotstar and premiered on 25 June 2022 as announced through Disney+ Hotstar Malaysia's YouTube channel in the "June 2022 Highlights" video on the regional Southeast Asian version as they received lower viewership in India and instead focusing on the designated areas.

It was revealed on 3 August 2022 that it would be divided into two parts with the first part aired for 7 episodes from 25 June to 6 August while the second part is scheduled to release in December. The teaser trailer for part two was released on YouTube.

Soon after the release of its first episode, illegal torrents started to circulate on the Internet. On its official Twitter handle, it was requested to stop the piracy by submitting any illegal torrent link to them. The creators also requested people not to pest or threaten them to release the new season on other platforms. They assured to broadcast the series on other platforms or regions when available in future.

On 26 August 2022, the staff and casts for the English dub for Season 3 were announced. The ADR director is Michael Schneider, while the casting director is Rachel Slotky. It was produced by Reuben Lack and adapted by Emily Fajardo and Meli Grant. Annika Perkins was involved in spotting, while dialogue was edited by Brian Hubbard and John Montoya.

== Controversy ==
It was discovered that several fans and fan bases were indulged into creating explicit/sexually inappropriate content of the characters; and were being circulated on social media. Official handles took a notice of this and asked the users not to encourage the wrong acts that "disgrace" the character's depiction and respect them to be as normal entities.

== Reception ==
=== Awards and nominations ===
Awards and Nomination
Year	Award	Category	Nominee	Result
2016	Malaysia Film Festival	Best Short Animated Film	Ejen Ali (WAU Animations)	Won
2017	Mob-Ex Awards	Best App - Creativity	Ejen Ali: MATA Training Academy	Won (Gold)
2017	Mob-Ex Awards	Best App - Media Owner	Ejen Ali: MATA Training Academy	Won (Gold)
2017	Mob-Ex Awards	Best App - Tablets	Ejen Ali: MATA Training Academy	Won (Gold)
2017	Mob-Ex Awards	Best App - Games & Entertainment	Ejen Ali: MATA Training Academy	Won (Bronze)
2017	Mob-Ex Awards	Best App - Games & Entertainment	Ejen Ali: Emergency	Won (Gold)
2017	Mob-Ex Awards	Best App - Tablets	Ejen Ali: Emergency	Won (Bronze)
2021	Anugerah Bintang Popular Berita Harian	Best Animation	Ejen Ali (WAU Animation)	Won

=== Ejen Ali national and international fanbase ===
The series has a large fanbase in Malaysia and Indonesia. It also attracts viewers and fans in certain countries like Canada, the United States, India, Ireland, Australia, Vietnam and the Philippines.

== Other media ==
=== Video game ===
Before the release of Ejen Ali, WAU Animation with the collaboration with Media Prima Digital released its own game which is Ejen Ali: MATA Training Academy for Android and iOS users on 4 March 2016. The game was downloaded for over 260,000 times. The second game, Ejen Ali: Emergency was released for iOS and Android in September 2016. Ejen Ali: Emergency is co-produce with Malaysia video game company Common Extract after the company won a Game Jam organised by Media Prima Digital, Primeworks Studios, Wau Animation and Multimedia Development Corp.

Both games have succeeded to win medals in Mob-Ex Awards 2017. Ejen Ali: MATA Training Academy won three golds which were Best App - Creativity, Best App - Media Owner and Best App - Tablets and one bronze which was Best App - Games & Entertainment, while Ejen Ali: Emergency won one gold for Best App - Games and Entertainment and one bronze for Best App - Tablets.

In early 2020, WAU Animation with Media Prima Digital announced the releasing of a new game, "Ejen Ali: Agent's Arena", which was to be available on Android, later iOS, but now it has been removed from most of the databases. It's already being played in Malaysia. Ejen Ali: Agents Arena is co-produce with Common Extract.

=== Collaboration ===
Ejen Ali and Mobile Legends: Bang Bang announced their collaboration for in-game items exclusively for Malaysia release in conjunction with the release of the second movie in the franchise, Ejen Ali The Movie 2. The collaboration would later extended to Indonesia region with the addition of emotes as part of the M7 World Championship marketing, which Aurora Gaming from the Philippines won the tournament. The mascots of Ejen Ali and Ejen Alicia were featured in the opening ceremony of M7 World Championship on 9 January 2026, at Batavia PIK, Jakarta.

=== Films ===
After two seasons of animated TV series, WAU Animations produced its first film, titled Ejen Ali: The Movie, which was released on 28 November 2019 in Malaysia.

Wau Animation released Ejen Ali: The Movie 2 on 22 May 2025 which takes place after the third season.

On April 3, 2026, to celebrate the 10th anniversary of Ejen Ali franchise, WAU Animation released the poster for the 3rd movie sequel, named Ejen Ali The Movie 3 via their official socials. The movie is set to be shown in Malaysian cinema by 2028.
