= WAU Animation =

Malaysian animation studio

WAU Animation Sdn Bhd
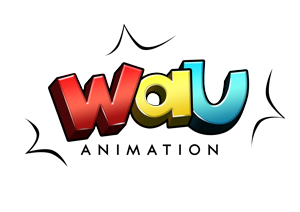
- Type: Private
- Industry: Animation; Mass media; Entertainment
- Founded: 18 March 2013; 13 years ago
- Founder: Usamah Zaid Yasin; Faiz Hanafiah; Nazmi Yatim; Shafiq Isa; Fuad Md Din
- Headquarters: Cyberjaya, Selangor, Malaysia
- Key people: Usamah Zaid Yasin (CEO); Faiz Hanafiah (COO); Fuad Md Din (CBO); Nazmi Yatim (CCO); Shafiq Isa (COO)
- Products: Television; Animated series
- Number of employees: 89
- Website: www.wau.my

WAU Animation Sdn Bhd is a Malaysian animation studio based in Cyberjaya, Selangor, in Malaysia. WAU Animation focuses on producing and developing original animated programmes for TV3 Malaysia, such as Ejen Ali. WAU Animation was founded on 18 March 2013, by Usamah Zaid Yasin.

== Filmography ==
=== Television ===
- Ejen Ali (2016–2023)

==== Coming soon ====
- Neon Luna (TBA) (Note: for co-production of music, voice acting and audio design)
- Gelecek (TBA)

=== Film ===
- Aliff Dalam 7 Dimensi (2016) (Note: helping in 3D animation with Chain FX)
- BoBoiBoy: The Movie (2016) (Note: helping in Additional Technical Support)
- Ejen Ali: The Movie (2019)
- Didi & Friends the Movie (2023) (Note: helping in scriptwriting and storyboard)
- Soloz: Game of Life (2025) (Note: helping in Music)
- Ejen Ali The Movie 2 (2025)

==== Coming soon ====
- Nirnama (2029)

=== Short film ===
- Ejen Ali Misi: Juang (Disember 2020) - penampilan khas Tan Sri Dr. Noor Hisham Abdullah

=== Others ===
- Ejen Ali Misi: Juang (2020; short film) (Tan Sri Dr. Noor Hisham Abdullah's special appearance)
- Ejen Ali x KidZania Malaysia 5th Anivessary
- Ejen Ali - #MisiAspirasiAirAsia
- M.A.T.A. SPY JET ASSEMBLE (in partnership with AirAsia)
- Ejen Ali x Mamee Monster Biskidz
- Ejen Ali x GSC PSA Kebakaran (for Ejen Ali: The Movie)
- Ejen Ali - #KuasaDiTanganAnda (in partnership with Tenaga Nasional Berhad)
- Cerita Anif (Note: in partnership with Universiti Sains Malaysia)
