= Didi & Friends =

Malaysian educational entertainment brand franchise

- Industry: Media; Animation
- Genre: Children's entertainment
- Founded: 2012; 14 years ago
- Founder: Sinan Ismail; Hairulfaizalizwan Ahmad Sofian
- Headquarters: Cyberjaya, Selangor, Malaysia
- Parent: Digital Durian (2012–2021); Warnakala Studios (2021–present)
- Website: www.didiandfriends.com

Didi & Friends is a Malaysian children's entertainment brand franchise owned by Warnakala Studios, a Malaysian animation studio based in Cyberjaya, Selangor. Its content consists mainly of children's songs and nursery rhymes performed in both Malay and English. Their channel consists of songs and stories that are represented by the three serama chicken named Didi, Nana and Jojo.

The brand started in 2012 when it was still under Digital Durian and begin with its pilot project entitled Didi & Friends: The Science Explorers, followed by a YouTube channel that launched in 2014. Didi & Friends also expanded into a merchandise, a feature film and a stage show featuring its characters.

== History ==
Two high school friends, Sinan Ismail and Hairulfaizalizwan Ahmad Sofian founded Digital Durian in 2008, which was started out as a multimedia company, then as a wedding service provider before evolved into an animation studio. In 2012, they were awarded a RM50,000 allocation after took part in the Intellectual Property Creators' Challenge (IPCC) organised by the Malaysian Digital Economy Corporation (MDEC) and produced the franchise's pilot project, Didi & Friends: The Science Explorers, featuring the early character designs of Didi, Nana and Jojo.

In 2014, Didi & Friends' YouTube channel was launched under the title 'Didi & Friends - Lagu Kanak-Kanak' for Malay version and 'Didi & Friends - Nursery Rhymes & Kids Songs' for English version. Both channels consists of preschool songs, nursery rhymes and stories. The songs and stories generally are of two or three minutes. They are also available in compilation videos.

In 2021, Sinan Ismail, one of the creators of Didi & Friends, announced that he and his team at Digital Durian sells their ownership of Didi & Friends franchises to Warnakala Studios, founded by his former colleague, Hairulfaizalizwan. However, Sinan along with Zainul Wahab continued to be given a "based on characters created" credit in Didi & Friends under Warnakala Studios.

== Media ==
=== Animated series ===
- Cerita-cerita Didi & Friends (2017)
- Didi & Friends Rescue Squad (2022)
- Didi & Friends Kembara Muzikal (2024)
- Didi & Friends Story Time (2025)

=== Films ===
- Didi & Friends: The Science Explorers (2012)
- Konsert Hora Horey Didi & Friends (2018)
- Konsert Hora Horey Wayang Didi & Friends (2021)
- Didi & Friends the Movie (2023)

== Awards and accolades ==
Award(s)	Year	Recipient(s)	Category	Result	Ref(s)
Anugerah Bintang Popular Berita Harian	2021	Didi & Friends	Popular Animation Character	Nominated	
Asian Television Awards	2020	Didi & Friends	Best Preschool Program	Won	
