= Ejen Ali The Movie 2 =

2025 Malaysian animated film

- Directed by: Usamah Zaid Yasin
- Written by: Usamah Zaid Yasin; Hilam Bin Muhammad; Khairul Anwar Suwandi
- Based on: Ejen Ali by Usamah Zaid Yasin
- Produced by: Ayo Amirul; Kevin Foo; Salina Salmee; Azi Shafian
- Starring: Ida Rahayu Yusoff; Noorhayati Maslini Omar; Shafiq Isa; Azman Zulkiply
- Edited by: Nazmi Yatim; Reuben Singham; Usamah Zaid Yasin
- Music by: Azri Yunus; Hakim Kamal
- Production companies: WAU Animation; Komet Productions
- Distributed by: Primeworks Studios
- Release date: 22 May 2025
- Running time: 115 minutes
- Country: Malaysia
- Language: Malay
- Budget: RM 10 million
- Box office: RM 59.3 million

Ejen Ali The Movie 2 (also subtitled Misi: SATRIA (lit. 'Mission: SATRIA')) is a Malaysian animated spy-fi action film directed by Usamah Zaid Yasin, that premiered on May 22, 2025. The movie focuses on Ali's struggle with the emergence of the artificially intelligent S.A.T.R.I.A. armored suit and former M.A.T.A. Academy student Neonimus.

It is the second film produced by WAU Animation after Ejen Ali The Movie (2019). It is a continuation of the third season of the Ejen Ali series. Ejen Ali The Movie 2 has grossed RM55.1 million by June 2025, and became the second highest grossing animated film in Malaysia.

== Plot ==
Alicia is entrusted with the I.R.I.S., formerly wielded by Ali who is now testing Project S.A.T.R.I.A., Tekno head Dayang's AI-powered combat armour trained on data from M.A.T.A.'s pillars. (Note: As depicted in Ejen Ali The Movie and the season 3 finale of Ejen Ali, Mission: Champion.) Mayor Dato' Othman appoints his niece Elle and head of security Amir as the replacement Inviso and Neuro heads respectively. After training, Ali declines a request from Rizwan, no longer an agent and now joined by former Numeros members Dos and Trez, to leak M.A.T.A. documents about Numeros mastermind Cero.

At home, Ali is blackmailed by Neonimus—an expelled former M.A.T.A. Academy agent with the ability to remotely access electronics—into leaking all the M.A.T.A.'s agents identities, arranging an attack on the Cyberaya SMART Tunnel. M.A.T.A. arranges an infiltration on Neonimus utilising him and Ali's battle to trial S.A.T.R.I.A. where Alicia saves the others from Neonimus' spider robots. The agents are then assigned to capture Neonimus in an amusement park as he prepares another attack there. Neonimus captures Alicia, and hacks into the S.A.T.R.I.A. suit. After Alicia receives a premonition of S.A.T.R.I.A. destroying M.A.T.A. from I.R.I.S., Ali prepares to kill Neonimus but is intercepted by General Rama. Meanwhile, Rizwan's team go to the ruined Numeros lair to retrieve records about Neonimus.

Having himself detained, Neonimus uploads his virus into the M.A.T.A. headquarters, allowing Cero to control its electronics, forcing the pillar heads to evacuate to a nearby island. Alicia is given back I.R.I.S. by Rama who initially wanted to return it to Dayang. Ali decides to equip S.A.T.R.I.A. despite the risk of Cero overriding the already-compromised suit, turning Ali against the agents in the base including Alicia. Beaten, Alicia hands Ali the I.R.I.S., pleading him to defeat S.A.T.R.I.A. before Cero transfers her into it. Cero tells Ali his plans to liberate Cyberaya by undermining their leadership who would retreat to the island, and that Alicia was transferred due to higher compatibility with S.A.T.R.I.A. Neonimus escapes, but is tased by Dos who arrives with Trez and Rizwan, and encourages Ali to save Cyberaya from Cero with I.R.I.S.

Trez disconnects Neonimus' seized console from M.A.T.A's systems. At the island, Dayang reminds Amir and Elle of S.A.T.R.I.A.'s location, denouncing their decision to stay behind with Othman; Ali stops Trez from destroying the console, and reverse-engineers Neonimus' program to create an antivirus against Cero with I.R.I.S. and one of his spider robots. Cero confronts Rizwan's group, revealing that he begun detonating Cyberaya's central reactor, which would cause a chain explosion with the nearby underwater Azurium reserves, threatening the city unbeknownst to Cyberjaya's governors who would be hiding in the island bunker. Ali overrides I.R.I.S. to halt the detonation, and ends up reaching S.A.T.R.I.A.'s dimension, where he witnesses an unconscious Alicia at S.A.T.R.I.A.'s core.

Cero fights Ali then absorbs the pillar heads' data from S.A.T.R.I.A. before tormenting him with his past traumatic experiences. However, Alicia escapes from the core; the two make amends then materialise various objects to overpower Cero. Ali deploys the antivirus robot, opening a black hole consuming the core alongside Cero. As they try to escape, Cero attempts to drag Ali into the black hole with him, but Alicia lets herself be absorbed to help Ali escape, emerging from the damaged suit. Dayang fails to archive S.A.T.R.I.A. as Othman rescinds her position as Tekno head, transferring management of S.A.T.R.I.A. to him due to its risks.

After the examinations, Ali visits an amnesiac Alicia in the hospital to return I.R.I.S. to her. She is then welcomed by General Rama and her adoptive family members. Rizwan hands Neonimus' console containing his plans and communication logs to Dayang and Ganz. Meanwhile, Ali tries to access Alicia's older records but is restricted due to insufficient clearance.

== Voice cast ==
- Ida Rahayu Yusoff as Ali Ghazali, a young Tekno agent who occasionally wields a pair of smartglasses named I.R.I.S. (Infinity Retinal Iris System) and is now tasked with wielding S.A.T.R.I.A., an artificially intelligent liquid metal armour suit.
  - Ida also voices Comot, Ali’s pet cat with cloaking abilities.
- Noorhayati Maslini as Alicia Kheng, a young Neuro agent wielding a slingshot in combat and Ali's best friend who succeeds him as the current wielder of I.R.I.S.
- Shafiq Isa as:
  - Bakar, Ali's maternal uncle, a Kombat agent wielding plasma shields.
  - Ganz, the hot-headed leader of the Kombat pillar.
  - Razman and Rajesh, a pair of undercover M.A.T.A. agents working at their Mamak restaurant front Mamak Maju. Shafiq also voices the news anchor throughout the film.
- Azman Zulkiply as:
  - Rizwan, an Inviso agent with an affinity for lollipops who wields specialised gloves to jab at opponents' pressure points.
  - General Rama, the stern general of M.A.T.A. and Alicia's adoptive father.
- Omar H. Ali as Amir, the replacement leader of the Neuro pillar succeeding Zain.
- Su Ling Chan as Elle, the replacement leader of the Inviso pillar and Othman's niece.
- Abu Shafian Abd Hamid as Dato' Othman, the selfish, corrupt mayor and founder of Cyberaya.
- Nurul Radhiah Ibrahim as Dos, a former Numeros agent wielding plasma weaponry who now works alongside Rizwan.
- Ahmad Sufian Mazilan as Bobby, an Inviso agent wielding a boomerang in combat.
- Megat Zahrin Megat Hisham as Trez, a former Numeros agent wielding cybernetic gauntlets who now works alongside Rizwan. Megat Zahrin also voices Fit, a Tekno agent who is Bobby's partner-in-combat.
- Aina Nadzir as Dayang, the gentle leader of the Tekno pillar and creator of S.A.T.R.I.A.
- M. Nasir as Cero, the enigmatic, shape-shifting founder of Numeros.
- Qayyim Zamani as Mus, aka the 'Neonimus', a psychopathic former Tekno agent wielding spider-like robots that can compromise and hack electronics.

== Production ==
The film was expected to cost RM 10 million, which is higher than the first film's budget of RM 6.5 million. Production work began in early 2023 and involved local talent.

WAU Animation also partnered with Tenaga Nasional Berhad as the main sponsor.

== Music ==
The film's score is composed by Azri Yunus, as in the first movie.

The song "Hanya Kamu" performed by Dato' M. Nasir was released as the film’s theme song. It was co-written by Dato' M. Nasir and Azri Yunus.

== Release ==
WAU Animation officially announced the project on 13 September 2024 at the Malaysia Digital Content Festival 2024, revealing a first look at the SATRIA suit that will appear in the second film. A second teaser video was released on 13 December 2024, introducing Neonimus as one of the new characters. The third teaser was officially launched on 16 February 2025 during the 39th Anugerah Juara Lagu (AJL) along with a special performance of "Hanya Kamu" by Dato' M. Nasir.

== Reception ==
=== Box office ===
Days of screening	Cumulative sales	Ref
4 days (25 May 2025)	RM15.3 million	
8 days (29 May 2025)	RM21.9 million	
11 days (1 June 2025)	RM34.2 million	
13 days (3 June 2025)	RM40.6 million	
18 days (8 June 2025)	RM50.7 million	
26 days (15 June 2025)	RM55.1 million	
33 days (23 June 2025)	RM57 million	
39 days (29 June 2025)	RM59.3 million	
