= Didi & Friends the Movie =

- Theatrical release poster
- Directed by: Akmal Aziz Asmawi; Roshfaizal Ariffin
- Written by: Sumie Azil; Roshfaizal Ariffin; Akmal Aziz Asmawi; Sheikh Fadhil Sheikh Ishak
- Story by: Khairul Ammar Jamal
- Based on: Didi & Friends by Sinan Ismail and Zainul Wahab
- Produced by: Hairulfaizalizwan Ahmad Sofian; Sinan Ismail; Raja Jastina Raja Arshad
- Starring: Nur Insyeerah; Adilia Myra; Adam Muqri; Awie; W.A.R.I.S.; Amelia Henderson; Ruminah Sidek; Khairul Ammar Jamal; Akmal Aziz Asmawi
- Edited by: Helmi Syafiq; Sheikh Fadhil Sheikh Ishak; Hariz Aizuddin
- Music by: Saiful Ridzuan Sharafuddin
- Production companies: Warnakala Studios; Digital Durian
- Distributed by: Astro Shaw
- Release date: 23 February 2023
- Running time: 104 minutes
- Country: Malaysia
- Language: Malay
- Budget: RM 6 million
- Box office: RM 8.1 million

Didi & Friends the Movie (Note: Original title: Didi & Friends The Movie - Legenda Muzika) is a 2023 Malaysian animated musical adventure film co-produced by Astro Shaw, Warnakala Studios and Digital Durian in association with the Malaysia Digital Economic Corporation (MDEC). The film was co-directed by Akmal Aziz Asmawi and Roshfaizal Ariffin, with screenplay by Roshfaizal, Sumie Azil and Akmal Aziz. It is based on Didi & Friends animated series and starring the voice of Nur Insyeerah, Adilia Myra, Adam Muqri and also stars Awie, Amelia Henderson, W.A.R.I.S. and Ruminah Sidek. The film was released in Malaysia, Singapore and Brunei on 23 February 2023, and received generally positive reviews from critics, earning RM8.195 million gross.

== Plot ==
Didi, Jojo and Nana were the three best friends who are given the task by Pak Atan to organize the Hora Horey Concert in Pekan Horey. When all the preparations seem to be going smoothly, suddenly a problem arises involving Pak Beruang, causing Pak Atan and Pak Beruang to have to travel to Legenda Island to find a cure.

== Voice cast ==
- Nur Insyeerah as Didi
- Adilia Myra as Nana
- Adam Muqri as Jojo
- Awie as Tok Chip
- W.A.R.I.S. as Torra
- Amelia Henderson as Captain Zee
- Ruminah Sidek as Grandma Tortoise
- Khairul Ammar Jamal as Pak Atan
- Akmal Aziz Asmawi and Hael Husaini as Pak Beruang
