= Ejen Ali The Movie =

- Official theatrical poster
- Directed by: Usamah Zaid Yasin
- Screenplay by: Usamah Zaid Yasin; Faqihin Mohd Fazlin; Hilman Muhamad
- Story by: Usamah Zaid Yasin; Faiz Hanafiah; Shafiq Isa; Nazmi Yatim; Fuad Md Din
- Based on: Ejen Ali by Usamah Zaid Yasin
- Produced by: Faiz Hanafiah
- Starring: Ida Rahayu Yusoff; Nabilah Rais; Azman Zulkiply; Noorhayati Maslini Omar; Shafiq Isa; Salina Salmee Mohd Ali; Abu Shafian Abd Hamid; Ahmad Sufian Mazilan; Megat Zahrin Megat Hisham; Altimet
- Edited by: Andi Abdul Ghani; Reuben Singham
- Music by: Azri Yunus; Hakim Kamal
- Production companies: WAU Animation; Primeworks Studios
- Distributed by: Primeworks Studios
- Release date: 28 November 2019
- Running time: 97 minutes
- Country: Malaysia
- Language: Malay
- Budget: RM6.5 million (US$1.57 Million)
- Box office: RM30.05 million (US$7.26 million)

Ejen Ali The Movie (also subtitled Misi: Neo (lit. 'Mission: Neo')) is a 2019 Malaysian Malay-language animated spy-fi action film. The film follows a 12-year old spy Agent, Ali, as he embraces his role in MATA, the secret agency, and uncover the secret technology which has threatened the fate of Cyberaya. Unbeknownst to Ali, M.A.T.A. has also created a new improved version of I.R.I.S., the I.R.I.S. Neo, which can activate Override Mode at will. While the new device itself is trialed for all agents, Ali questions his usefulness to M.A.T.A. He is approached by another mysterious person named Niki, who holds a personal connection between Ali. Risking his loyalty to M.A.T.A., Agent Ali will now embark his thrilling chase to unravel those mysterious links.

Based on the local TV animation series Ejen Ali, it is the first film from WAU Animation. It is directed by Usamah Zaid Yasin and co-written by Usamah himself, Faqihin Mohd Fazlin, Shafiq Isa, Nazmi Yatim and Hilman Muhamad.

It has received positive reviews from audiences and critics locally, with praise for its action sequences, storyline, character developments and emotional depth. It grossed over RM30 million in Malaysia, making it the highest-grossing Malaysian animated film of all time.

After the film's success and the awards it received, a follow-up titled Ejen Ali The Movie 2 was announced by WAU Animation in 2020 and released on 22 May 2025.

== Plot ==
15 years ago, Niki and her childhood friend Aliya steal an artificial heart from a container port to save a woman named Mak Yah. As they were cornered by M.A.T.A.'s pillar heads, Aliya tells Niki to escape with the heart.

Presently, intruders hijack a plane transporting Cyberaya mayor Dato' Othman. Ali, Alicia and Bakar come to rescue, though the intruders escape. Agents Bobby and Fit arrive to save Othman who is ejected as Fit lands the plane with an Override Mode similar to I.R.I.S.'s. Ali finds that Bobby and Fit are testing the I.R.I.S. Neo, a newer version of I.R.I.S. that can repeatedly utilise Override Mode. Back home, Ali finds a flash drive in a musical box Aliya left. Alicia, Ali and Bakar go to M.A.T.A. from Mamak Maju to discuss with Othman, who reveals he established M.A.T.A. while developing Cyberaya, having every agent serve him unquestionably. General Rama confirms the fuel in the hijacking as Azureum while the weaponry and perpetrators originate not from Cyberaya. He orders a raid on Abang Bear, suspecting he smuggled the weapons. As Bear escapes, Niki apprehends him and swipes the weapons. Ali chases Niki on his scooter to Pinggiran, Cyberaya's outskirt slums.

As Ali recovers in Niki's hideout, he finds a similar symbol to the flash drive on Niki's earrings, and Niki confirms Ali is Aliya's son. Aliya met Niki in the city and helped her to walk again, fighting together for Pinggiran and maintaining it; the stolen weaponry had the Azureum fuel required to sustain Pinggiran. Bear's interrogation reveals the dealer as Vikram Chandra, head of Beta Tower and an associate of Othman. Rama finds a stockpile of Azureum at Beta Tower which Ali has Niki retrieve. She inadvertently triggers its security systems, but Ali's Override helps her escape. They celebrate at Niki's hideout, where Ali meets Mak Yah.

Pressured by Othman, Rama orders a raid on Vikram's "nests" at Beta Tower, suspecting him of the hijacking; Ali and Niki clear the nests before the agents arrive. Noticing Ali's scooter traces and absence from the Beta Tower mission, Alicia worries for Ali who is conflicted on working under the selfish Othman. Returning to Niki's hideout, Ali is pursued to a shopping mall by the agents. After Fit removes Ali's I.R.I.S., Niki captures him, Bakar and Alicia, obtaining Fit's I.R.I.S. Neo. She subdues Ali—who renounces her cruelty—before accessing Fit's I.R.I.S. with Aliya's flash drive.

Niki reveals that Aliya originally created the I.R.I.S.; that night, M.A.T.A approached and recruited her at the port. Hearing this, Niki felt betrayed, and one day she launched three missiles from Cyberaya's defence facility against their mayor's office. However, Aliya, sent to stop Niki, overrides her I.R.I.S., sacrificing her life to destroy the missiles. Niki confronts Vikram, who tries to retrieve the stolen weapons at Pinggiran.

Mak Yah returns Ali his I.R.I.S. and Niki threatens Othman at his factory's inauguration, but the agents (with several wielding I.R.I.S. Neos) ambush her. However, Niki overrides and controls their I.R.I.S. Neos. Unaffected, Ali overrides his I.R.I.S. Entering its dimension, he discovers Aliya, who reveals the glasses runs on stored data of its previous owner which would be erased after overriding again and tells him success comes from the user, not the device. After deactivating the I.R.I.S. Neos, Ali stops Niki from killing Othman to avenge her parents, who were killed during Othman's factory's construction. Defeated, Niki tries suicidally exploding her Azurium armour, but Aliya's data is transferred to Niki's I.R.I.S., disarming her.

Three days later, Othman recovers from his injuries and Vikram is fired from Beta Tower. Ali is reinstated into M.A.T.A., but is split from I.R.I.S. due to his collusion with Niki. The I.R.I.S. Neo is discontinued due to security flaws discovered and Bakar shows Ali past videos of his older sister Aliya. Dr. Ghazali, Ali's father, announces his plans to redevelop Pinggiran. After the agents hold a celebratory feast at Mamak Maju, Dayang assigns Ali to an artificially intelligent armour suit dubbed "Project S.A.T.R.I.A."

== Cast ==
- Ida Rahayu Yusoff as Ali, a young Tekno agent wielding a pair of smartglasses named I.R.I.S. (Infinity Retinal Iris System).
  - Yusoff also voices Comot, Ali's pet cat with cloaking abilities.
- Nabilah Rais as Niki, a warrior from the outskirts of Cyberaya and Aliya's former friend.
- Noorhayati Maslini Omar as Alicia, a young Neuro agent wielding a slingshot who serves as Ali's best friend and rival.
- Shafiq Isa as Bakar, Ali's maternal uncle who is a Kombat agent wielding plasma shields.
- Azman Zulkiply as General Rama, the General of M.A.T.A. and Alicia's adoptive father.
- Salina Salmee Mohd Ali as Aliya, Ali's late mother and Bakar's older sister who befriended Niki.
- Abu Shafian Abd Hamid as Dato' Othman, the unscrupulous mayor and founder of Cyberaya.
- Ahmad Sufian Mazilan as Bobby, an Inviso agent wielding a boomerang in combat who is testing the I.R.I.S. Neo alongside Fit.
- Megat Zahrin Megat Hisham as Fit, a Tekno agent and Fit's partner who is testing the I.R.I.S. Neo.
- Azuan Wanji as Vikram Chandra, the leader of Beta Tower.
- Altimet as Andik, one of Niki's henchmen.
- Amir Mustaqim as Surya, one of Niki's henchmen.
- Fadhli Shafian as Abang Bear, a recurring weapons trafficker.

=== English dub ===
- Steven Bones as Ali
- Ida Rahayu Yusoff as Comot
- Anita Woo as Niki
- Denise Chan as Alicia
- Azman Zulkiply as General Rama, Bakar & Viktor
- Adila Shakir as Aliya
- Jay Sheldon as Dato' Othman
- Bryan Chong as Bobby
- Gavin Yap as Fit & Andik
- Ruben Kevin as Vikram
- Papi Zak as Surya
- Colin Chong as Abang Bear

== Production ==
The film costs RM6.5 million to produce, including promotion cost. The filmmaking team consists of a total of 80 local animation designers and graphic artists. The production of this film uses high-quality digital technology. The average crews who produced this animated movie is between the ages of 25 and 28. The process of filmmaking took about one and a half years to be finished.

== Soundtrack ==
Ejen Ali The Movie (Official Motion Picture Soundtrack)

Film score by Azri Yunus, Hakim Kamal and Altimet
- Released: 27 December 2019
- Recorded: 2019
- Genre: Score
- Length: 71:20
- Label: Monkey Bone

"Bukalah Matamu"

Single by Aisyah Aziz & Bunga
- Released: 20 September 2019
- Recorded: 2019
- Genre: Pop; Hip Hop; EDM
- Length: 4:19
- Label: Monkey Bone
- Songwriters: Azri Yunus; Bunga; Usamah Zaid Yasin; WAU Animation; TheFatRat (Christian Friedrich Johannes Büttner)
- Producer: WAU Animation

"Kita Jaga Kita"

Single by Altimet, Cuurley & Malik Abdullah
- Released: 25 October 2019
- Recorded: 2019
- Genre: Pop; Hip Hop; EDM
- Length: 3:41
- Label: Monkey Bone
- Songwriters: Cuurley; Altimet; Bo Amir Iqram
- Producer: WAU Animation

The music score is composed by the lead composer, Azri Yunus, assisted by the assistant composer, Hakim Kamal. Azri Yunus stated that the difference of the music score in the series with this film is they wanted to put more ecstatic value by putting in more emotional feelings to make audiences in the cinemas attached. The official soundtrack album of the film is released on 27 December 2019.

"Bukalah Matamu" is the first single released from the official soundtrack, released on YouTube and all streaming platforms on 20 September 2019. The song sends a message to people who have everything to open their eyes and improve themselves.

However, "Bukalah Matamu" went into a controversy where it was claimed that the song has a similarity with a song ''The Calling'' from foreign artists TheFatRat and Laura Brehm. The director, Usamah has explained that they have no intention to imitate the song as claimed by most people. They made the song by making a few group bands as references, such as Linkin Park and Daft Punk. When the crew realized that the song has similarities with "The Calling", they were surprised and immediately contacted TheFatRat to explain the situation, while offering them credit to the song and a bit of royalty from the film.

"Kita Jaga Kita" is the second single released from the official soundtrack. The lyrics of the songs comes from the perspective of the people of the fictional urban slum Pinggiran in Cyberaya. In March 2020, the single is used as the theme song for the national COVID-19 prevention campaign and Movement Control Order by the Malaysian Government through the #kitajagakita hashtag. On 31 August 2020, in celebration of the country's 63rd Independence Day, an official music video of the song is released, which is dedicated to all frontliners across Malaysia.

Track listing:
| No. | Title | Length |
|---|---|---|
| 1. | "Kita Berjumpa Akhirnya" | 9:43 |
| 2. | "Pengganas. Cepat! Cepat! Cepat!" | 3:00 |
| 3. | "Kamu Patut Berasa Bangga" | 1:50 |
| 4. | "Siapa Nak Makan Satay?" | 1:12 |
| 5. | "Ali's Lullaby (Music Box)" | 2:22 |
| 6. | "Cyberaya" | 0:25 |
| 7. | "HQ M.A.T.A" | 1:11 |
| 8. | "Kejar Abang Bear!" | 2:26 |
| 9. | "Pengenalan" | 2:08 |
| 10. | "Wira Pinggiran (Flashback Niki)" | 2:23 |
| 11. | "Menara Beta" | 3:11 |
| 12. | "Aku Tahu Jalannya" | 2:25 |
| 13. | "Kau Macam Aliya" | 2:59 |
| 14. | "Cari Dia Sampai Dapat (Kita Jaga Kita)" (performed by Altimet, Cuurley and Malik Abdullah) | 2:18 |
| 15. | "Kejar Dia!" | 2:59 |
| 16. | "Perangkap" | 4:10 |
| 17. | "Cerita Sebenar" | 4:54 |
| 18. | "Buka Mata" | 2:19 |
| 19. | "Serangan Kasar" | 2:46 |
| 20. | "Mau Pigi Mana? (Mamak Maju)" | 0:46 |
| 21. | "Dikawal & Terkawal (Override Mode)" | 2:37 |
| 22. | "Akan Sentiasa Dengan Kamu" | 5:39 |
| 23. | "Hilang Tiada Ganti - Tamat" (performed by Ida Rahayu Yusoff) | 3:12 |
| 24. | "Mamak Maju (Music Compile)" | 1:42 |
| 25. | "Mama (Ada Di Hatimu Selalu)" (performed by Ida Rahayu Yusoff) | 2:51 |
| Total length: | | 71:20 |

== Release ==
WAU Animation announced this film project when they released their first teaser trailer for this movie on 7 August 2018. The second teaser trailer is released on 29 March 2019. The first official trailer was premiered on 1 August 2019, while the second official trailer was premiered on 9 October 2019.

On 2 October 2019, WAU Animation had officially released the official theatrical poster of the film, which also revealed the release date for Malaysian cinemas. It was released in 146 cinemas in Malaysia, 8 in Singapore and 7 in Brunei. There was also a possibility of it being screened in 50 countries but Ahmad Izham Omar, CEO of Primeworks Studios ultimately denied of releasing the movie further in all countries, and stated that they had finalized the release with their selective countries and they won't be expanding to further international release. For the Indonesian market, the film is released in CGV, Kota Cinemas, Platinum Cineplex and Flix Indonesia on 1 January 2020.

In Vietnam, the film was screened in the country as representative of Malaysia in the ASEAN Film Week 2020, the event held by the Ministry of Culture, Sport and Tourism, the government body of the Socialist Republic of Vietnam, as a way to celebrate Vietnam's chairmanship of ASEAN summit in 2020. It was the only animated-featured film to join the event. The film was screened for free for the public in 3 major cities holding the event, including the capital Hanoi, Da Nang and Ho Chi Minh city. The first screening session of the movie in Vietnam was on 21 July 2020, in the National Cinema Center in Hanoi.

Ejen Ali The Movie: MISI: NEO was also nominated at Cartoons on the Bay, the international animation festival organized by Italian's national TV & radio broadcaster - RAI, in 2020 for the Best Animated Feature Movie category.

In Brazil, it was released on 16 April 2021, for representing Malaysia at Animated Feature Film Competition of the Fantaspoa Festival 2021.

On 14 February, its release in Uzbekistan was confirmed announced.

Subsequently, the film was also released on the local and regional Netflix as well as Disney+ Hotstar for Malaysia only.

In India, this film was aired on March 24, 2024 on Hungama TV.

== Reception ==
| Days of screening | Cumulative sales |
|---|---|
| 1 day (28 November) | RM 1.86 million (US$452,894) |
| 3 days (30 November) | RM 6.4 million (US$1.56 million) |
| 7 days (4 December) | RM 13 million (US$3.17 million) |
| 14 days (11 December) | RM 20 million (US$4.87 million) |
| 21 days (18 December) | RM 25 million (US$6.09 million) |
| 30 days (27 December) | RM 28.5 million (US$6.94 million) |
| 43 days (9 January) | RM 30 million (US$7.36 million) |
| 77 days (12 February) | RM 30.05 million (US$7.38 million) |

Ejen Ali The Movie has grossed over RM30 million in Malaysia. Originally, WAU Animation targeted RM20 million for the local market for this film, in which the film achieved in only 14 days of screening. It has surpassed another 2019 Malaysian animation film BoBoiBoy Movie 2 (RM30 million), making it the highest-grossing local Malaysian animated film of all time, until it was surpassed by Mechamato Movie in 2022, the highest-grossing Malaysian film in 2019 and the fourth highest-grossing Malaysian film of all time.

=== Awards and nominations ===
| Year | Award | Category | Nominee | Result | Ref(s) |
|---|---|---|---|---|---|
| 2020 | 24th Cartoons on the Bay Pulcinella Awards | Best Animated Feature Film | Ejen Ali The Movie | Nominated | |
| 2021 | 31st Malaysia Film Festival | Best Animated Film | Ejen Ali The Movie | Won | |
