= Usamah Zaid Yasin =

Malaysian animator

- Born: Muhammad Usamah Zaid bin Yasin; December 19, 1983 (age 42); Kuala Lumpur, Malaysia
- Other name: Chief Z
- Education: Multimedia University (MMU)
- Occupations: Founder & CEO of WAU Animation; Animator; Director; Voice actor
- Years active: 2005–present
- Notable work: Upin & Ipin; Ejen Ali
- Spouse: Azi Shafian (m. 2009)
- Children: 2

Muhammad Usamah Zaid bin Yasin (born 19 December 1983) is a Malaysian animator. He is known for his work at Les' Copaque Production's animated series, Upin & Ipin and animated film, Geng: The Adventure Begins. He is also served as the CEO of WAU Animation, an animation studio he founded in 2013 and also become creator and director of Ejen Ali.

== Career ==
=== 2005–2013: Early career ===
On his final year project, Usamah Zaid, along with his close friends, Nizam Razak, Safwan Karim and Nazrul Hadi Nazlan created Misi Mustahak, a short film about three old folks role-playing as spies.

After graduating from Multimedia University (MMU), Usamah joined Les' Copaque Production together with his close friends, Nizam and Anas Abdul Aziz. They came up with the animation series Upin & Ipin where he served as an assistant director, later become its director starting from Season 4, replacing Nizam who left Les' Copaque in 2009 with Anas, Safwan Karim and Kee Yong Pin to establish Animonsta Studios.

Besides working as the assistant director for the series, Usamah also worked as the animation director and 3D character rigging for Geng: The Adventure Begins.

=== 2013–present: Ejen Ali and onwards ===
Having spent 7 years at Les' Copaque, Usamah left the company and established his own animation company, WAU Animation where he served as CEO. WAU Animation is the producer of Ejen Ali that aired on TV3 since 8 April 2016. He served as the director, executive producer, screenplay and voice actor in the series.

In 2016, Usamah with his close friend, Faiz Hanafiah supervised 3D animation for Aliff Dalam 7 Dimensi by Astro Shaw and Chain FX.

He directed and screenplay his first ever film based on Ejen Ali animated series, Ejen Ali: The Movie. The film received positive reviews and collected RM30.05 million box office. This led him to receive nominations from the Malaysia Film Festival and Asian Academy Creative Awards.

== Filmography ==
Year	Title	Creator	Director	Writer	Producer	Voice role(s)	Notes
2007–2013	Upin & Ipin	No	Yes	Yes	No		Also as assistant director from Season 1 to Season 3
2009	Geng: The Adventure Begins	No	No	No	No		As animation director, 3D character rigging, compostior and editor
2016	BoBoiBoy: The Movie	No	No	No	No		As additional technical support
2016	Aliff Dalam 7 Dimensi	No	No	No	No		As animation supervisor with Faiz Hanafiah
2016–present	Ejen Ali	Yes	Yes	Yes	Executive	Wak Musang, Dr. Tong, Agent Karya, Agent Zain (Note: Originally, Zain was voiced by Shafiq Isa for Misi: Orientasi episode and Fuad Md Din for Misi: Main episode) & Dato' Hisham	Also as editor
2019	Ejen Ali: The Movie	Yes	Yes	Yes	Executive	Zain & Rahul	Also as editor and voice director
2023	Didi & Friends The Movie	No	No	Script consultant & script supervisor	Second Unit		
2025	Ejen Ali: The Movie 2	Yes	Yes	Yes	Executive		
TBA	Gelecek †	Pending	Pending	Pending	Pending		In production
