= Librarians in popular culture =

Librarians in popular culture can be found across many different mediums, including film, television, music and literature. Their portrayal is varied and can represent or subvert various stereotypes. Libraries and librarians are recurring elements in fiction.

== Films ==
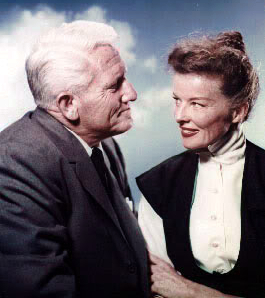
Katharine Hepburn and Spencer Tracy in a publicity shot for Desk Set.

According to Ann Seidl, director of the documentary The Hollywood Librarian, librarians in film are often portrayed as meek, timid, and unassertive in nature. After indexing hundreds of appearances of librarians in film, she found that "the shorter the reference to a librarian in a film, the worse the stereotype." Additionally, in an article looking at library stereotypes perpetrated in Hollywood movies, academic librarian Jennifer Snoek-Brown argued that films, as well as TV shows, often get "library call numbers wrong," but stated that "the usefulness, trustworthiness, and purpose of librarians" is often conveyed, and librarians in film are "becoming more ethnically diverse."

By the 1950s, movies had established the stereotype of librarians as "spinsters" and "eggheads". Thus, female movie librarians are usually unmarried, prim, and introverted. They are usually young and may be attractive, but dress drably and are sexually repressed. The "fate-worse-than-death view of librarians" is particularly evident in movies such as It's a Wonderful Life and The Music Man. In It's a Wonderful Life (1946), Mary Hatch Bailey (played by Donna Reed), is depicted as an "old maid." It is also evident in films like Foul Play which features a shy San Francisco librarian fall in love with a "goofy cop." In contrast, male movie librarians – mild, intelligent, and timid – have fewer and less important roles.

Another stereotype mentioned is the staggeringly rude and unhelpful librarian (John Rothman) in Sophie's Choice (1982), who barks at Sophie Zawistowski (Meryl Streep) "Do you want me to draw you a map?!" More recently and continuing the stereotype of unpleasant librarians, in the Disney/Pixar film Monsters University (2013), Alison Nastasi of Flavorwire says the university librarian "isn't fond of noise and doesn't think twice about tossing rowdy students out the window into a pond below". Another example of this librarian type is depicted in Citizen Kane.

These negative portrayals are in contrast with such more well-rounded characters, such as librarian Bunny Watson (played by Katharine Hepburn) who teaches Richard Sumner (played by Spencer Tracy) a few things about modern research methods in the movie Desk Set (1957) and the no-nonsense "Marian the Librarian" (Shirley Jones) in the movie The Music Man. Mary (played by Parker Posey) as the ultimate Party Girl (1995) who discovers, "I want to be a librarian!" in a notable exception to the prim librarian stereotype.

Librarians in film are usually ordinary people caught up in circumstances, rather than being heroes; likewise they are rarely villainous although they may have flaws, such as racism in Goodbye, Columbus. The Public, a 2018 movie by Emilio Estevez depicts a librarian, Stuart Goodson, who is comfortable with the homeless people who use his public library every day. Goodson becomes involved in a fight over doing the right thing: in this case finding shelter for the homeless on a bitterly cold night. Goodson, as the film reveals, has overcome his own personal demons in order to achieve a career as a librarian. Alicia Hull (played by Bette Davis), is a small town librarian, who befriends young Freddie Slater (Kevin Coughlin) but is herself ostracized for refusing to remove a book on Communism from the public library during the height of the Red Scare in Storm Center (1956). This movie was inspired by the real-life dismissal of Ruth Brown, a librarian in Bartlesville, Oklahoma.

The comedy film Tomcats (2001) features Heather Stephens as Jill, a seemingly shy, repressed librarian who leads a double life as a lifestyle (nonoccupational) dominatrix. In Only Two Can Play (1962), Peter Sellers portrays a poorly paid and professionally frustrated Welsh librarian and occasional drama critic, whose affections fluctuate between glamorous Liz and his long-suffering wife Jean. In the comedic UHF by "Weird Al" Yankovic, the character Conan the Librarian makes a brief appearance. This character has exaggerated muscles, speaks in Austrian-accented English patterned after Arnold Schwarzenegger's portrayal of Conan, chastises a library patron for not knowing the Dewey Decimal System, and slices a patron in two for returning a book overdue. In an article in January 2021, Brian Cronin of CBR added that this character did not originate in a Monty Python episode.

Librarians can serve a function in fantasy films. In 1994's live-action animated film The Pagemaster, frightened and pessimistic Richard Tyler (Macaulay Culkin) meets an eccentric librarian, Mr. Dewey (Christopher Lloyd), who encourages Richard to get a library card and starting off an adventure. By the end of the film, Mr. Dewey is hinted at being the titular Pagemaster and none of the adventure in the film was a dream. Mr. Dewey introduced Richard to the adventures possible in libraries and books as he "knows just how magical of a place a library can be." Similarly, a librarian appears in the beginning of the 1984 Hollywood box office hit, Ghostbusters and the "bitter old librarian" in Indiana Jones & The Last Crusade who thinks all the banging in the librarian is coming from his stamp, but it is actually coming from Indiana Jones "trying to break the floor apart. Similarly, in the 1983 film, Something Wicked This Way Comes there is a librarian in a small town who is the only person other than the protagonists who wants to face "the mysterious leader of an evil carnival" and Madam Irma Pince in the Harry Potter film series who heads the library at the Hogwarts School of Witchcraft and Wizardry, and is fiercely protective of the books. The protagonist of The Time Traveler's Wife is Henry DeTamble, a reference librarian who travels randomly into his own future or past. Kettnich and Jaeger discuss dramas that highlight librarians' challenges to access in films.

Finally, the main character of The Mummy (1999) is a librarian named Evelyn Carnahan (Rachel Weisz), who is clumsy and later moves away from her profession in the sequels. A memorable quote from her, upon introduction to the other main character shows a more positive depiction of librarians:

Evelyn: "Look, I... I may not be an explorer, or an adventurer, or a treasure-seeker, or a gunfighter, Mr. O'Connell, but I am proud of what I am."

Rick: "And what is that?"

Evelyn: "I... am a librarian."

From 2004 to 2008, the John Rogers fantasy-adventure television film franchise, The Librarian, aired on TNT. The three films focus on a librarian (portrayed by Noah Wyle) who protects secret artifacts in the Metropolitan Public Library in New York.

== Literature ==
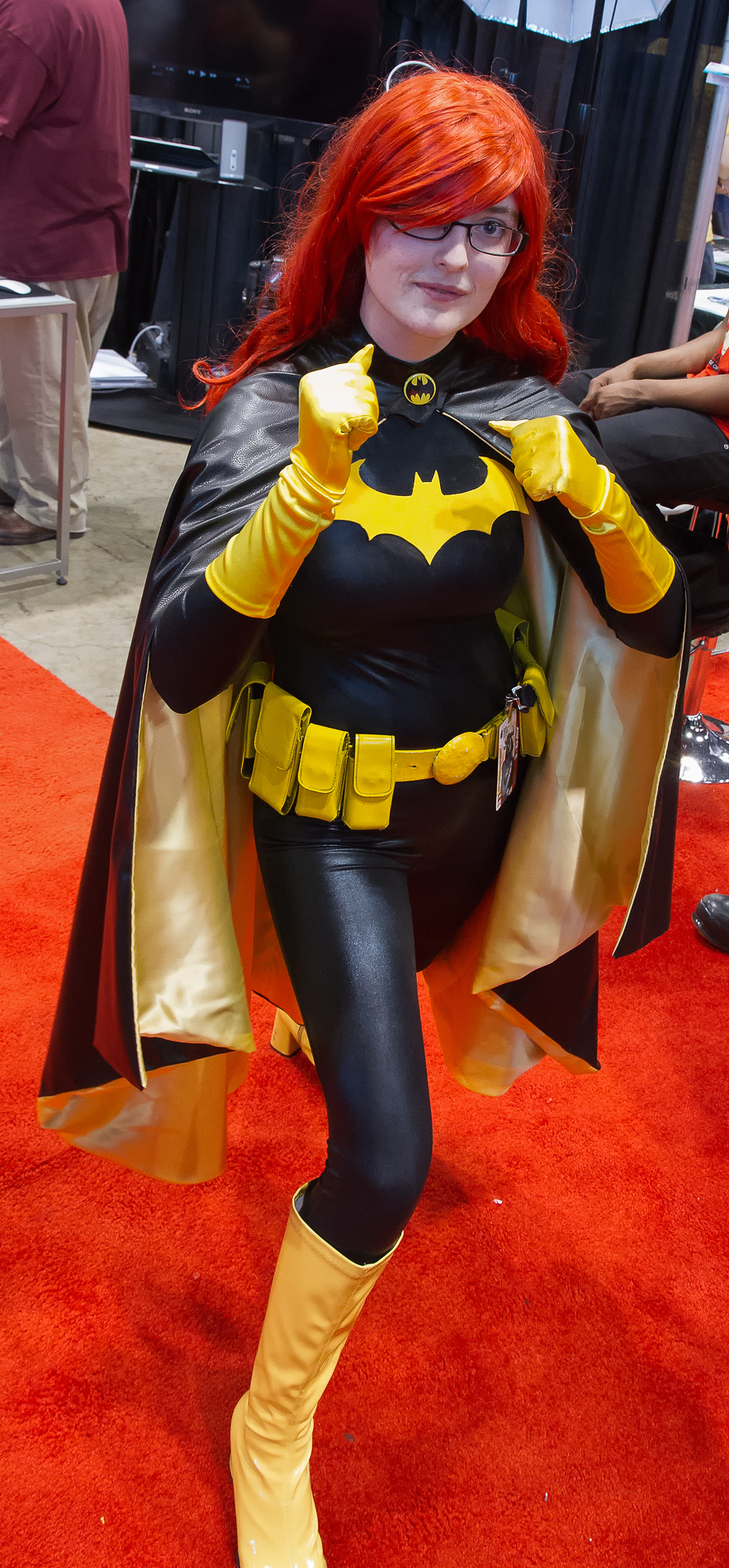
Cosplay of Batgirl, who worked as a librarian in Gotham City when she was not fighting crime.

Children's literature offers a generally positive portrayal of librarians as knowledgeable, helpful, amazing, and friendly, becoming more positive over the course of the 20th century. Adult literature, however, portrays the profession more negatively. Between these, portrayals of librarians in young adult fiction are neutral to negative. Here librarians are predominantly female, middle-aged, usually unattractive in some way, and mostly unmarried. Personality is mixed between positive traits such as intelligence, likeability, and kind-heartedness; and negative traits such as strictness, timidity, excess fastidiousness, and eccentricity. While some provide assistance to the main characters, several are the villains of the story. Duties generally include reference, but may only show clerical tasks; however the amount of technology used by librarian characters has increased over time. Ashanti White, author of the 2012 book, Not Your Ordinary Librarian: Debunking the Popular Perceptions of Librarians, wrote that the shushing buttoned-down, older librarian was the most common depiction of librarians, in fiction, followed by the sexy librarian, stereotype.

A disproportionate number of the librarians represented in novels are in the detective fiction genre, frequently as an amateur detective and protagonist. Although the stereotype of the librarian as a "passive bore" does not seem reconcilable with the intensity of a mystery, the stereotypical librarian does share many traits with the successful detective. Their mindset is focused, calm, unbiased in considering viewpoints, and focused on the world around them. By personality they are industrious perfectionists—and eccentric. The drab and innocuous look of the stereotypical librarian is perfect for avoiding suspicion, while their research skills and ability to ask the right questions allow them to procure and evaluate the information necessary to solve the case. The knowledge they have gained from wide reading successfully competes with a private investigator's personal experience. For example, Jacqueline Kirby is drawn into the mystery in Elizabeth Peters' novel The Seventh Sinner (1972) due to her awareness of her surroundings. Wearing the stereotypical bun, glasses, and practical clothes, together with an eccentrically large purse, she is self-possessed and resourceful, knowledgeable in a variety of fields and skilled at research.

Batgirl as Dr. Barbara Gordon in DC comics is depicted as working as librarian in Gotham City's Public Library. The book Drawn to the Stacks: Essays on Libraries, Librarians and Archives in Comics and Graphic Novels includes the chapter "Barbara Gordon as Information Literacy Activist in Batgirl: Son of Penguin," which "argues that Gordon’s confrontation with unethical algorithms in the 2017 story arc is a crucial and deeply insightful representation of librarians as an integral part of American society and the pursuit of justice."

Librarians appeared in other literature as well. For instance, Neal Stephenson's novel Snow Crash features a commercialized melding of the Central Intelligence Agency and the Library of Congress, along with a virtual librarian who assists the main character, and raises questions of the role of the librarian in an increasingly information-rich world. Also, the eponymous character in Garth Nix's Lirael (2001) is an assistant librarian whose curiosity about the library she works in leads her into trouble and whose research skills save her. The head librarian is intimidating and the library itself is a dangerous place.

There are other fictional librarians in literature as well. Allison Carroll in Jo Walton's Among Others serves as a mentor to the main protagonist and Madam Irma Pince is the librarian at Hogwarts during the Harry Potter series by J. K. Rowling. Madam Pince embodies many negative librarian stereotypes — she's controlling, intimidating, she shushes, and she values books over patrons. Similarly, there is the Librarian in Terry Pratchett's Discworld fantasy series, a once-human wizard who manages the library at the Unseen University, Lucien serves on the Dream Castle's staff as chief librarian in Neil Gaiman's The Sandman series, and the podcast Welcome to Night Vale's Rabid Librarians will go to incredibly violent ends to ensure that the community is reading. In Audrey Niffenegger's The Time Traveler's Wife, Henry, one of the two central characters, is a librarian working in the Newberry Library; one of his fears about his Chrono-Displacement disorder is that he may one day get trapped in the "Cage" in the library.

== Television and streamed media ==
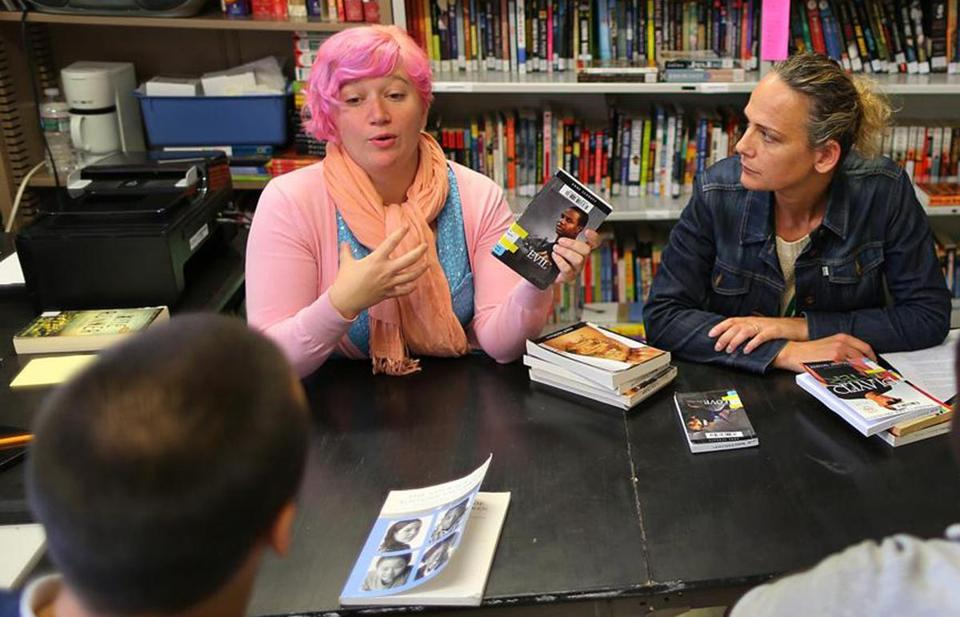
Laura Koenig (left) and Jessi Snow talked books with teens in the custody of the Department of Youth Services at the Copley Library in Boston, MA in October 2013

Librarians have often been depicted in broadcast and streamed television series.

Last of the Summer Wine, a BBC comedy that ran from 1973 to 2010 was originally titled The Library Mob. Many episodes took place in the local library and featured library staff.

CBS, NBC, Cartoon Network, and Disney Channel had a number of shows which depicted librarians. For instance, in season 2 episode 6 ("Caged") of CSI: Crime Scene Investigation, a CBS show, actor Michael A. Goorjian plays Aaron Pratt, an autistic librarian who witnesses the death of a colleague. Pratt states that he has "a master's in library science and an English degree from UNLV." Additionally, in an episode of another CBS show, The Crazy Ones, "The Monster", actress Melody Thomas Scott plays Flora, a drunk librarian who uses a lot of complex and verbose words, whose library is on a verge of shutting down. But with the help of Simon and the group, her library was saved. NBC also featured librarians in one of its most popular shows. In the 2009 Parks and Recreation episode "Ron and Tammy", Leslie Knope's dreams of a local park are almost squashed by Tammy, the new library director at the Pawnee Public Library and Ron Swanson's ex-wife. Tammy places a claim for the lot that Leslie intended to use for her park. Tammy then tries to sexually manipulate Ron into giving her the lot for the library. Leslie calls librarians "diabolical, ruthless bunch of bureaucrats" as well as "punk-ass book jockeys." In "Ron and Tammy: II", Leslie says Tammy is "just a manipulative, psychotic, library book-peddling, sex-crazed, she-demon." Tammy also has books on "Approved" and "Rejected" shelves, which insinuates that the library operates in a biased manner. The depictions of the library on Parks and Recreation "illuminate the nature of library anxiety." A more positive depiction appears in an episode of Cartoon Network's We Bare Bears, titled "The Library". In the episode, the old librarian lady, who is not used to modern technology, helps Panda print Chloe's practice test, with the help of modern technology in one scene. Finally, the Disney Channel featured librarians in the show Big City Greens. In the episode titled "Quiet Please," a librarian at a city library shushes the protagonists and threatens to push them out if they make a sound. As a result, the protagonists communicate with each other using ASL after seeing two deaf library patrons communicating the same way. In the Phineas and Ferb episode, "Dude, We're Getting the Band Back Together", Sherman (formerly known as "Swampy", the drummer for "Love Händel") now worked as a librarian, after Love Händel's disbandment.

CBS, NBC, Cartoon Network, and Disney Channel were not alone in having characters who were librarians. In the PBS puppet series Between the Lions, which broadcast from 2000 to 2010, and promotes early reading to little children, features Theo and Cleo Lion as the librarians. Also, in an episode of Are You Afraid of the Dark? called "The Tale of the Quiet Librarian", an elderly librarian named Mercy MacGregor haunts the library during closing hours and uses the box to steal the patrons' voices, mostly noisy children. On the other hand, a SyFy show The Magicians (based on the series by Lev Grossman) has a strong focus on libraries. In the show, the Library of the Netherlands is an archive that contains all of the knowledge in the universe. Librarians formed the Order of the Librarians, a group that protects that knowledge. The Library is staffed by Zelda Schiff, a prim, glasses-and-cardigan-wearing librarian whose biggest concern is the possible defacement of library books. Uniquely, when creating the Australian miniseries The Librarians, co-producers and writers Wayne Hope and Robyn Butler consulted with real librarians for research and took their advice to avoid shushing and cardigan-wearing librarian characters. This contrasts with the stereotypical school librarian, Rupert Giles in the Buffy the Vampire Slayer series. The character wears old-fashioned clothes and spectacles, is intelligent and well-read although he dislikes computers, and is overly concerned with following regulations, although he later is given an opportunity to develop beyond these stereotypes. There was also a TNT series, The Librarians, an extension of the eponymous film franchise of the same name. It follows a new team of librarians who solve mysteries, recover powerful artifacts, and fight against supernatural threats. Additionally, Belle plays a princess-turned-librarian in "Once Upon A Time", which broadcast on ABC.

Various streamed shows have featured librarians. For instance, in Hilda, there is a character known as "The Librarian." One reviewer, a librarian named Burkely Hermann, called her character "among the most positive pop culture depictions of librarians," apart with libraries in Cleopatra in Space and She-Ra and the Princesses of Power. Hermann also states that the nine minutes in the first season of Hilda within a library setting makes a "strong impression," as it includes an episode featuring a special collections room. They further argued that the series makes clear the "importance of librarians and libraries for years to come." In another article by Hermann, they examine the second season of Hilda, calling the character, who gets a name in the season, (Note: She is named Kaisa, presumably after her voice actress, Kaisa Hammarlund) the "most intriguing librarian characters in recent TV memory," who gets more screen time. This review further said that the season continually highlights the value of libraries and librarians time and again, along with knowledge and proper organization. In another article, Hermann looked at library settings in Cleopatra in Space and She-Ra and the Princesses of Power. In terms of the latter show, they noted the season 2 finale focuses "around two middle-aged gay Black librarians," George and Lance which contrasts with the depiction of a white and long-haired stereotypical librarian in She-Ra: Princess of Power, and argued that the series, as a whole, "shows librarians as helpful, welcoming, and diverse."

Apart from the above-named shows, Orange Is the New Black, which streamed on Netflix as well, featured a librarian. Specifically, Tasha "Taystee" Jefferson, within the Litchfield Penitentiary with other women, is an outspoken librarian who is loyal, ambitious, and learned. Another review pointed to an animated web series, Too Loud, describing it as a show which those of all ages can enjoy, especially "its message about the value of libraries." One review in March 2021 pointed to library scenes in the series Mira, Royal Detective, comparing the series to Hilda, while noting that the show's 22nd episode emphasizes the "value of libraries," complete with a bookmobile, and the characters singing a song "about the importance of reading and libraries" while the show's protagonist and her father serve as librarians. The reviewer hoped that the series continues to make clear the "importance of libraries" in the future. He also reviewed libraries and librarians in the series Welcome to the Wayne in April 2021. He argued that in this series a "special and magnificent library" is central, going beyond positive depictions in recent years, with the chief librarian as a Black woman named Clara Rhone, voiced by Harriett D. Foy. This included episodes, he wrote, where "the issues of underfunded libraries and the value of knowledge," were central, as was the focus on librarians as gatekeepers, and others which made clear the value of librarians, and libraries, as "places of knowledge and diversity."

Marienne Bellamy, librarian in the fictional town of Madre Linda, acted by Tati Gabrielle, was a love interest in the third series of You (TV series). Dante Ferguson, another librarian at Madre Linda was played by Ben Mehl.

In the ever-popular Nickelodeon cartoon titled Avatar: The Last Airbender, an elephant-sized black owl by the name of Wan Shi Tong tends a towering library in the middle of the desert. He refers to his library as the "Spirit Library," and to himself as "He Who Knows Ten Thousand Things." Despite being a talking animal, he is given the same strict and intimidating personality that accompanies most fictional librarians. The massively successful mature cartoon Bob's Burgers features a high-strung school librarian named Mr. Ambrose. He is given a personality that does not correspond with the most common librarian stereotypes. Instead of being stoic and controlling, he pays little attention to the students and expresses dissatisfaction with his job.

== Other media ==
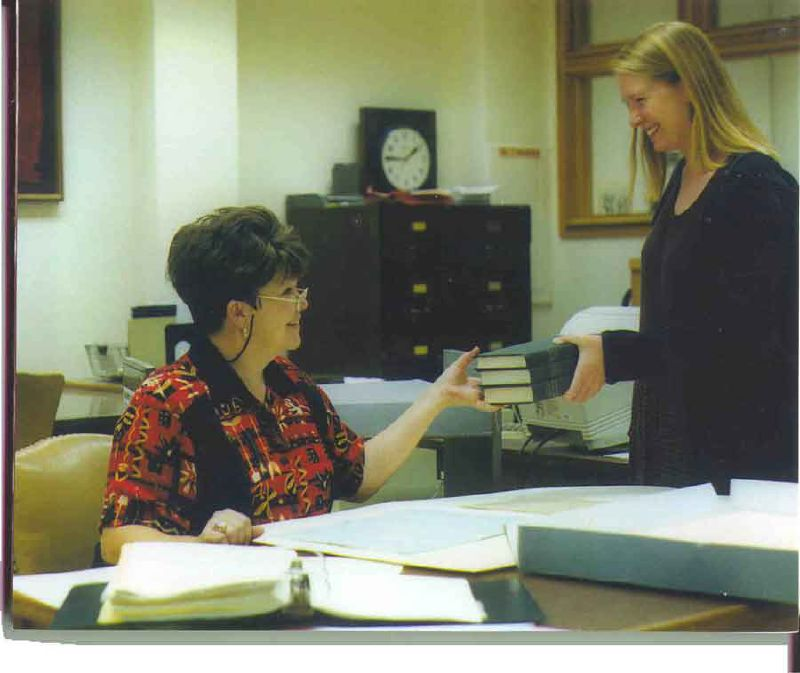
Reference staff assists patron in July 2007 at Texas State Library and Archives Commission.

Librarians have appeared in interactive entertainment and in online mediums. They are often portrayed as guides and/or purveyors of knowledge who help the user progress within the game like in The Elder Scrolls V: Skyrim.

In 2006, Microsoft introduced an early version of what was to become the Bing search engine that used over 600 pre-recorded video clips of actor Janina Gavankar, portraying the character of "Ms Dewey", described as a sexy librarian character. Ramirose Ilene Attebury, in Library Philosophy and Practice, reported she found that the sexy librarian stereotype was more popular than the old maid stereotype, in YouTube videos.

Similarly, various songs focus on librarians. For instance, the retrospective compilation album of Tori Amos is called Tales of a Librarian, while My Morning Jacket's 2008 album Evil Urges features a song called "Librarian" and 2013 album of the American punk band Swingin' Utters, Poorly Formed includes a song titled "The Librarians Are Hiding Something." Additionally, the song, "Karen" of the Go-Betweens' album Lee Remick (1978), is an ode to a librarian, and Velocity Girl's 1993 album Copacetic contains the song titled "Lisa Librarian." In the same vein, Mrs. Phelps in Matilda was a librarian. She worked to help young readers, giving their advice, saying things like "sit back and allow the words to wash around you, like music."

Librarians appeared in other media too, including model figures. In 2003, Archie McPhee brought out a librarian action figure, modeled on Seattle Public Library librarian Nancy Pearl. 28,000 action figures were sold in the first week of their availability. Wearing a suit, hair bun and glasses, the action figure sparked controversy, particularly for the button-triggered shushing motion. Many librarians took it in a light-hearted spirit, while others felt it perpetuated negative stereotypes. The original version of the action figure was discontinued, but Archie McPhee now sells a super-hero version of Pearl with a "removable cape and a deep understanding of how knowledge is organized."

== Stereotypes ==
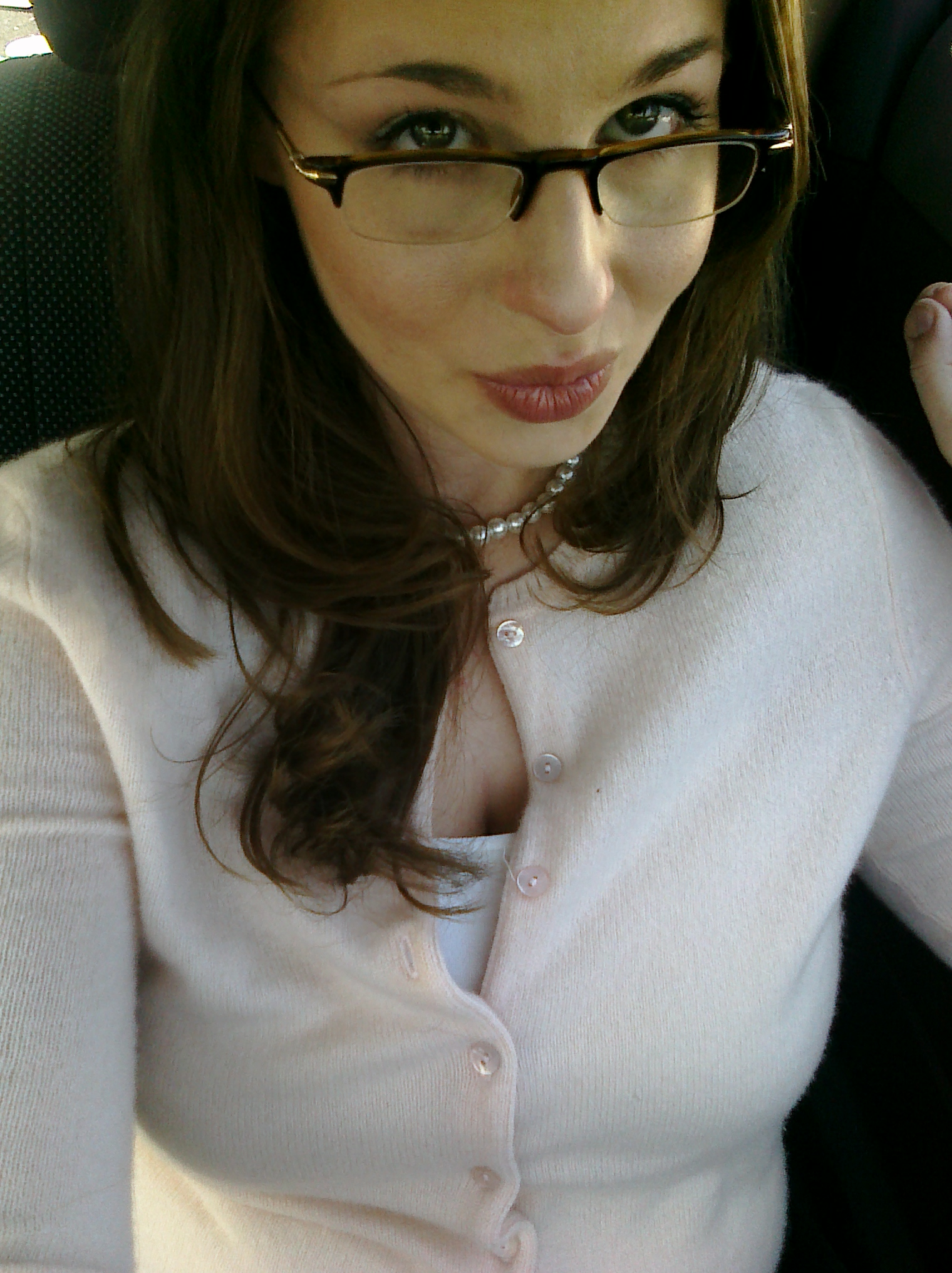
According to scholars the stereotype of the "sexy librarian" has surged to become the most popular representation of librarians, in online videos.

Stereotypes of librarians in popular culture are frequently negative: librarians are portrayed as puritanical, punitive, unattractive, and introverted if female, or timid and effeminate if male. Such inaccurate stereotypes are likely to have a negative impact on the attractiveness of librarianship as a profession to young people.

In modern times, the archetype of the "sexy librarian" has also begun to gain some traction, introduced in an effort to subvert the popular matriarchal image and make them more appealing to the average consumer. Both archetypes boil down to a similar idea, however – an authoritative, implacable guardian of the books who, through either power or sex appeal, keeps the library patrons in fear and thus remains exclusive guardian of the otherwise obscure organization system in the library. In 2015, librarian Gretchen Keer gave a broader view, writing that these stereotypes have roots in anxieties about the librarian profession itself:

"We cannot separate our understanding of library stereotypes from the history of librarianship that influenced their development in the first place...There are numerous librarian stereotypes, with the most recognizable being the middle-aged, bun-wearing, comfortably shod, shushing librarian. Others include the sexy librarian, the superhero librarian, and the hipster or tattooed librarian. These stereotypes are all characterized predominantly as feminine, white women. Newer librarian stereotypes, particularly those proffered by librarians themselves, tend to be depicted as younger white women. The original librarian stereotype, which was superseded by the introduction of his prudish sister, was that of the fussy (white) male curmudgeon...Librarian stereotypes can be traced, in part, to cultural anxieties about the emergence of the profession...we can conclude that, despite being beloved by a number of prominent and not-so-prominent individuals, librarianship as we know it is often treated in popular culture as a low- status profession or not a profession at all...It is important to acknowledge that stereotype threat is at work within librarianship because of the raced, classed, and gendered reality of individual librarians' lives."

== Notable examples ==
=== Books and comics ===
(Alphabetized by author's surname)

- Library War is a manga centered on armed librarians who defend their books from censors. It was later adapted into an anime series, an animated film in 2012, and two live-action films in 2013 and 2015.
- Batgirl as Dr. Barbara Gordon, who is depicted as working as librarian in Gotham City's Public Library.
- Jorge Luis Borges' short story, "The Library of Babel" (1941), depicts a universe consisting of a library of hexagonal rooms.
- In Ray Bradbury's science fiction novel, Fahrenheit 451 (1953), books are outlawed and some rebels fight back by memorizing works, making themselves living libraries.
- In Stephen King's horror novella, The Library Policeman (1990), the main antagonist of the story, Ardelia Lortz, is an elderly librarian who feed herself on the fear of children.
- Audrey Niffenegger's The Time Traveler's Wife features Henry, who works in the Newberry Library, and also appears in the film adaptation.
- Garth Nix's Lirael (2001) features Lirael, an assistant librarian.
- The Elizabeth Peters' novel The Seventh Sinner (1972) features Jacqueline Kirby, a librarian.
- The Barbara Pym novel, Some Tame Gazelle (1950), has several references to librarians, notably, Dr Nicholas Parnell (based on Robert Liddell) and Nathaniel Mold.There are also references to the Bodleian Library. A librarian is the protagonist, Ianthe Broome, in An Unsuitable Attachment (1963, published 1982), with scenes set in a library and many observations of librarian temperament.
- In Terry Pratchett's Discworld series, The Librarian of the Unseen University is a recurring character that first appears in 1983.
- In Ronnie Riley's children's novel Jude Saves the World the town librarian helps the non-binary protagonist to set up a popular safe space in the public library.
- Philip Roth's Goodbye, Columbus features a librarian who is racist.
- In J. K. Rowling's Harry Potter series, the castle of Hogwarts features a library. Madam Irma Pince is the librarian at Hogwarts during the series.
- Neal Stephenson's novel Snow Crash features a virtual librarian.
- In Jo Walton's Among Others, Allison Carroll is a librarian.
- Yakusoku wa Toshokan no Katasumi de is a manga about a university librarian who works alongside her crush.

=== Film and stage ===
(Alphabetical by series or title)

- In Angels and Demons (2009), the sequel to The Da Vinci Code (2006), Robert Langdon visits the Vatican Library and the Vatican archives several times to carry out research on the meaning and significance of various symbols.
- The Breakfast Club (1985), five high school students serve a Saturday detention in the school's library.
- Citizen Kane stars a librarian.
- The Day After Tomorrow (2004), a group of people takes shelter from sudden freezing cold in the New York Public Library, burning books to keep warm.
- Desk Set (1957) stars Katharine Hepburn as the head of a reference library; she and her staff are seemingly threatened with replacement by an early computer invented by Spencer Tracy's character.
- Doctor Strange (2016) features the Kamar-Taj library, which houses ancient books about powerful magical lore.
- Fahrenheit 451 (1966), an adaptation of Ray Bradbury's book.
- Foul Play features Gloria Mundy, a shy San Francisco librarian.
- The opening scenes of Ghostbusters (1984) include a haunted library with three librarian ghosts, filmed at the iconic central branch of the New York Public Library.
- Harry Potter films Harry Potter and the Philosopher's Stone (2001), Harry Potter and the Chamber of Secrets (2002), Harry Potter and the Goblet of Fire (2005), and Harry Potter and the Half-Blood Prince (2009) feature the Hogwarts Library.
- Indiana Jones & The Last Crusade features a trip to a Venetian Library and stereotypical male librarian.
- It's a Wonderful Life features Mary Hatch Bailey, an "old maid" librarian in Pottersville.
- John Wick: Chapter 3 – Parabellum (2019) features a scene that takes place in the New York Public Library.
- In The Librarian franchise, Flynn Carsen (Noah Wyle) is hired by the New York Metropolitan Library, and recruited into an ancient clandestine order of Librarians. He's introduced in the first original film of the franchise, The Librarian: Quest for the Spear (2004), where he is entrusted with the role of protecting the historical, and often magical, contents of a secret section of the library. He returns in The Librarian: Return to King Solomon's Mines (2006) and in The Librarian: Curse of the Judas Chalice (2008).
- The Lord of the Rings: The Fellowship of the Ring (2001), Gandalf travels to Gondor to research in Lord Denethor's Library the Ring in Bilbo's possession.
- The Disney/Pixar film Monsters University (2013) features a librarian.
- The Mummy (1999) features Evelyn Carnahan, the female lead who is a clumsy librarian. She also appeared in the two sequels of this film.
- The female lead in The Music Man is a librarian at the Madison Public Library and the musical features the song "Marian the Librarian". This Broadway show won five Tony Awards and its cast album won the first Grammy Award for Best Musical Theater Album and spent 245 weeks on the Billboard charts. It was also made into a film of the same name that was nominated for six Academy Awards and won the Golden Globe Award for Best Motion Picture – Musical or Comedy.
- The Name of the Rose (1986), an adaptation of Umberto Eco's novel.
- Only Two Can Play (1962) stars a Welsh librarian and occasional drama critic.
- The Party Girl (1995) stars Mary, a party girl who discovers she wants to be a librarian.
- The Pagemaster features Mr. Dewey, an eccentric librarian.
- The Public stars librarian Stuart Goodson, who is comfortable with the homeless people who use his public library every day.
- Oblivion (2013) takes place in an imagined future amidst the ruins of New York, including those of the New York Public Library.
- Red (2010) has Frank Moses (Bruce Willis), a former black-ops CIA agent, visiting a New York college library to look up a book after he obtained a postcard with a Dewey classification number on it.
- The musical She Loves Me (1963) includes the song "A Trip to the Library".
- Something Wicked This Way Comes (1983) features a librarian.
- Storm Center (1956) includes protagonist, Alicia Hull, a small town librarian.
- The Time Machine (2002), a film adaptation of H. G. Wells's novel, features a holographic artificial intelligence librarian at the New York Public Library in the year 2030 and afterwards.
- UHF (1989) features the character Conan the Librarian.

=== Television ===
(Alphabetical by series, then chronological by episode)

- A Good Librarian Like a Good Shepherd features a library which contains books which have the histories of every person's lives.
- Ascendance of a Bookworm centers on Myne, a former college librarian reincarnated as a sickly young girl who tries to bring printed books to the masses and works as a church librarian.
- The Big City Greens episode "Quiet Please" features an unnamed librarian at a city library.
- The Brave Animated Series character, Librarian Witch, a mage who has a crush with Lonely General, just to set him unconscious on a fantasy.
- The Buffy the Vampire Slayer (1997–2001) character, librarian Rupert Giles, serves as Buffy Summers' mentor and surrogate father figure; beneath the school library lies a secret gateway to the demon realms.
- An episode of CSI: Crime Scene Investigation features Aaron Pratt, an autistic librarian.
- In the Doctor Who episode "Silence in the Library" (2008), Donna Noble and Tenth Doctor visit a planet which is a 51st-century book repository simply called "The Library".
- In the Doctor Who episode "Journey to the Centre of the TARDIS" (2013), Clara visits the TARDIS library.
- In Game of Thrones, several libraries figure prominently: in Oldtown at The Citadel, maintained by maesters; in King's Landing at the Red Keep, maintained by septons; at Winterfell (where in the season 8 "Battle of Winterfell", Arya Stark is stalked by wights), maintained by House Stark's maestre; and at the Wall at Castle Black, maintained by Maester Aemon Targaryen of the Night's Watch; additionally, Shireen Baratheon uses books from her collection at Dragonstone to teach the imprisoned Davos Seaworth to read.
- Hilda features Kaisa, the librarian of the Trolberg Library and a witch.
- The Inspector Morse episode "Twilight of the Gods" (1993), featured the Bodleian Library
- Kokoro Library centers on sisters who work at small rural library in the "middle of nowhere".
- In one episode of Mira, Royal Detective, Mira and her father Sahil operate a bookmobile.
- In "Once Upon A Time", Belle is a princess-turned-librarian.
- Orange Is the New Black features Tasha "Taystee" Jefferson, a librarian at Litchfield Penitentiary.
- Episodes of Parks and Recreation feature Tammy, a librarian.
- Read or Die OVA centers on Yomiko Readman, a spy for British Library's Special Operations Division, who can manipulate paper, while the R.O.D the TV series focuses on others who can do the same, with Readman continuing to have a role.
- She-Ra and the Princesses of Power features George and Lance, two gay historians who run a family library.
- Silent Library was a television game show with a public library setting that aired on MTV from 2009 to 2011.
- In the Star Trek: The Original Series episode "All Our Yesterdays" (1969), Captain Kirk, McCoy, and Spock are transported back in time by the sole remaining inhabitant of a doomed planet: the librarian Mr. Atoz.
- In the Stranger Things (2016-2017), in the third episode of both seasons 1 and 2, the librarian of the Hawkins Public Library helps characters research information.
- Tatakau Shisho focuses on librarians who guard "books of the dead", with the past lives of people read in a book, after they die.
- The Ancient Magus' Bride: Those Awaiting a Star tells the story of a girl who finds a secret library and a librarian who protects her from monsters.
- The Crazy Ones features Flora, a drunk librarian.
- The Librarians (2007-2010) is an Australian television comedy series that has a librarian as the protagonist.
- The Librarians (2014-2018), a continuation of The Librarian film series, features several characters who work for The Library.
- In The Twilight Zone episode "The Obsolete Man" (1961), a totalitarian state, having banned books, sentences a librarian to death for the crime of being obsolete.
- The We Bare Bears episode "The Library" features an unnamed female librarian.
- Welcome to the Wayne features Clare Rhona, head librarian of The Stanza.
- Whispered Words includes an openly lesbian protagonist, Kazema, having a crush on her fellow librarian, Sumika.
- Yami to Bōshi to Hon no Tabibito has a protagonist named Lillith, who is guardian to the library of the worlds, allowing her to search for Eve, a former library caretaker.

=== Other ===
- "Ms Dewey", a sexy librarian character for the Bing search engine.
- Pearl, a librarian action figure, modeled on Seattle Public Library librarian Nancy Pearl.
- The Elder Scrolls V: Skyrim features a librarian.

== See also ==
- Films set in libraries category
- New York Public Library in popular culture
