= The Time Traveler's Wife (disambiguation) =

The Time Traveler's Wife may also refer to:

- The Time Traveler's Wife - a 2003 novel
- The Time Traveler's Wife (film) - 2009 film adaptation
- The Time Traveler's Wife (TV series) - 2022 TV adaptation
