= Vintage Vinyl =

American record store in Evanston, Illinois

Coordinates: 42.047223°N 87.684771°W

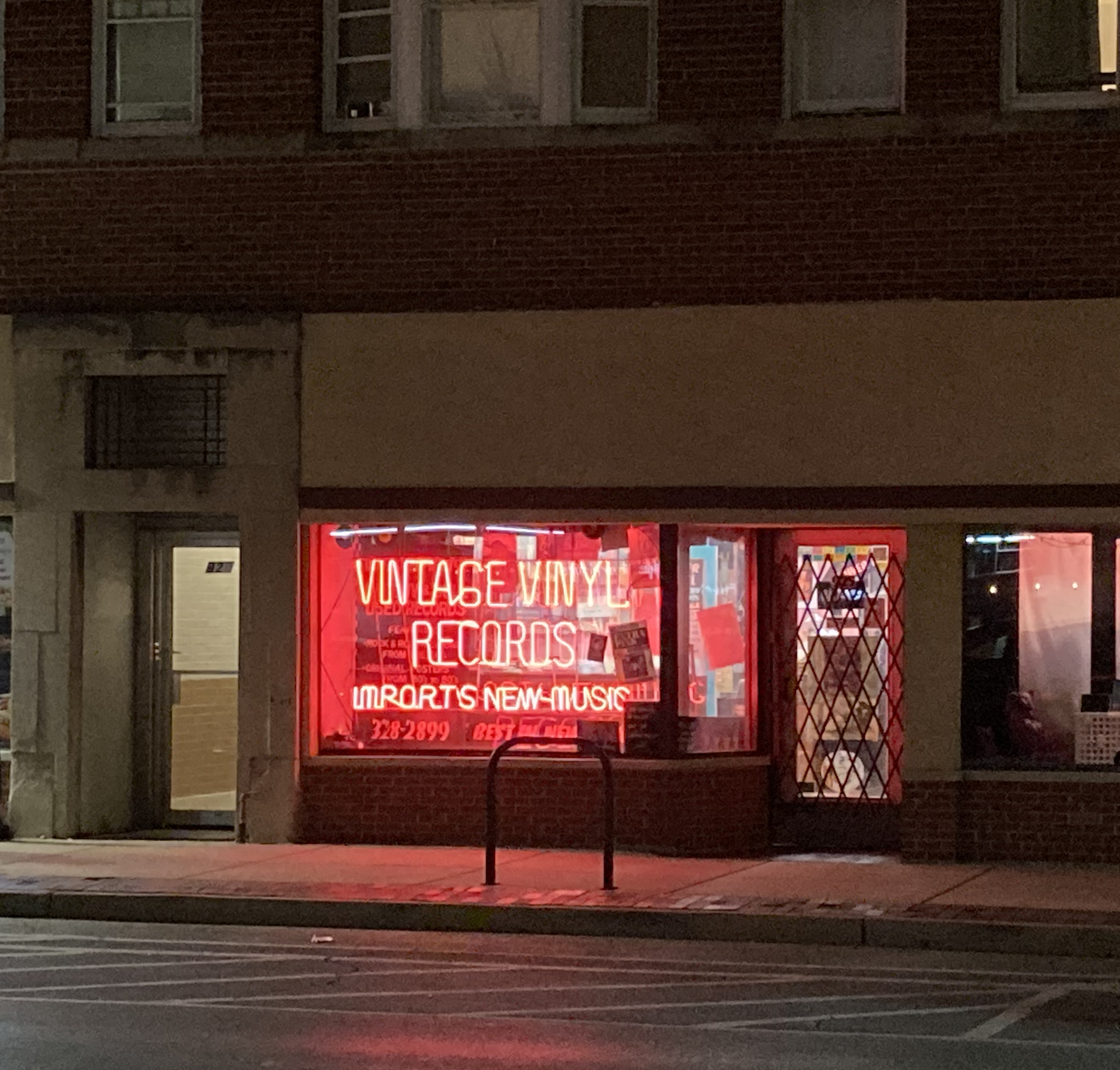
- Industry: Music retailer
- Founded: 1979; 47 years ago
- Headquarters: Evanston, Illinois, United States
- Owner: Steve Kay
- Website: www.vvmo.com

Vintage Vinyl is a record store in Evanston, Illinois, frequented by some of the world's most famous musicians and used as a reference in works of popular culture.

== Description ==
Over the years the store has been a favorite haunt of many noteworthy actors, musicians and authors, many of whom have referenced it in their work.

Author Audrey Niffenegger used the store owner, Steve Kay, as a character in her bestseller, The Time Traveler's Wife.

While it's not uncommon to spot musicians such as Billy Corgan in the building, most of the noteworthy rock stars who frequented the store did so in the 1980s and 1990s.
