= Rose Leslie =

Scottish actress (born 1987)

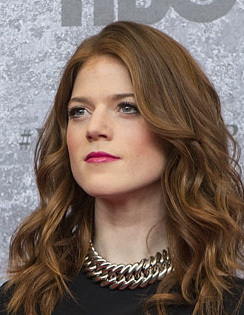
- Leslie in 2013
- Born: Rose Eleanor Arbuthnot-Leslie; 9 February 1987 (age 39); Aberdeen, Scotland
- Education: London Academy of Music and Dramatic Art (BA)
- Occupation: Actress
- Years active: 2005–present
- Spouse: Kit Harington (m. 2018)
- Children: 2
- Relatives: Simon Fraser (great-great-grandfather)

Rose Eleanor Arbuthnot-Leslie (Note: This British person has the barrelled surname Arbuthnot-Leslie, but is known by the surname Leslie.) (born 9 February 1987) is a Scottish actress. She is best known for playing Gwen Dawson in the ITV drama series Downton Abbey; Ygritte in the HBO fantasy series Game of Thrones; Maia Rindell in three seasons of the CBS All Access legal and political drama The Good Fight; and Clare Abshire in HBO's The Time Traveler's Wife.

== Early life and ancestry ==
Leslie was born in Aberdeen, Scotland, and raised at Lickleyhead Castle in Aberdeenshire, her family's 15th-century ancestral seat, where she lived until the age of 10. Her father, Sebastian Arbuthnot-Leslie, is the Chieftain of the Aberdeenshire branch of the Scottish Clan Leslie. Her mother is Candida Mary Sibyl "Candy" Leslie (née Weld) of Clan Fraser of Lovat, whose maternal great-grandfather was Simon Fraser, 13th Lord Lovat and a descendant of King Charles II. She is one of five children, having both elder brother and sister and a younger brother and sister. Her family currently lives at the 12th-century Wardhill Castle in Old Rayne.

She was first educated at Rayne North School in Aberdeenshire. At 10, she went to Ermitage International School in Maisons-Laffitte, France, where her family lived for three years. Upon their return to the UK, from 2000 to 2005, she was sent to Millfield, a boarding school in Street, Somerset, before spending three years at the London Academy of Music and Dramatic Art. She won a BASSC certificate in stage combat and graduated with a Bachelor of Arts with Honours in 2008.

== Career ==
One of her first professional acting jobs, in 2007, was narrating the BBC Radio documentary series The British Slave Trade: Abolition, Parliament and People.

Her first major screen role came at age 21, in the 2009 television film New Town, for which she won the Scottish BAFTA for Best Acting Performance – New Talent Award.

The following year she played the lead role of Mary, a country girl driven mad by lost love, in Nell Leyshon's play Bedlam at the Globe Theatre. The play was set in the Bethlem Royal Hospital and explored asylums and lunatic reform. The Daily Telegraph's Charles Spencer praised her performance, commenting, "Leslie proves genuinely poignant." Her break-through role came as Gwen Dawson, a housemaid, in the first series (2010–11) of the ITV television drama Downton Abbey. In 2011, while on Downton Abbey, Leslie briefly appeared in two episodes of the British drama series Case Histories.

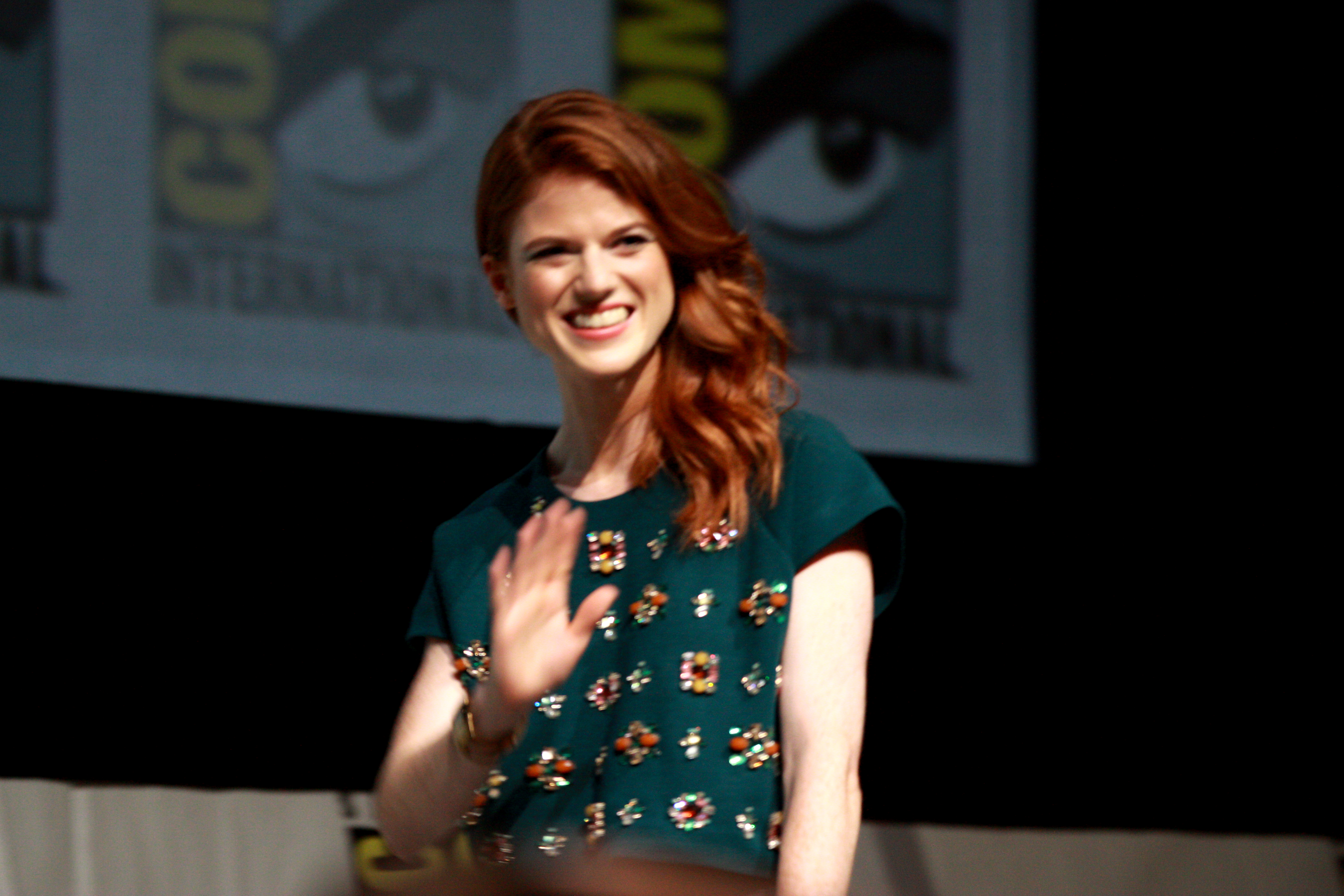
Leslie in 2013 for Game of Thrones Comic-Con panel

In 2012, she was cast in the popular HBO fantasy series Game of Thrones, appearing as a regular character in seasons two, three and four, as the wildling Ygritte. The A.V. Club's Rowan Kaiser stated: "As Ygritte, [Rose] is both dangerous and flirtatious, and it's fun to watch." Den of Geek's David Crow exclaimed, "A complicated character [...] Rose Leslie devours the screen." In 2013, Vox.com's Emily St. James (under The A.V. Club) review for "The Climb" episode, "(In the books) Ygritte is a means to an end... (but) on screen, as embodied by Rose Leslie, she becomes something more," whilst The Atlantic's Christopher Orr summed up her portrayal in the 2014 episode "The Watchers of the Wall" by concluding: "Rose Leslie has been one of a handful of performers on the show who've really elevated their characters above what they were in the books."

While on Game of Thrones, Leslie appeared in the 2012 drama film Now Is Good and in episodes of ITV detective television series Vera, Channel 4 conspiracy drama Utopia and BBC One's comedy series Blandings.

In 2014, she appeared in the four-part mini-series The Great Fire. and in the horror film Honeymoon.

In 2015, she played DS Emma Lane in two episodes of the BBC detective drama Luther with positive response, starred in the action adventure/fantasy film The Last Witch Hunter., and recorded an audiobook version of Carmilla. In 2016, she portrayed the character of Athena in Sticky Notes.

In 2016, Leslie was cast in The Good Fight, a CBS All Access legal drama and spin off to The Good Wife. She played Maia Rindell, a newly qualified young lawyer whose reputation is destroyed by her family's financial misdeeds, for the show's first three seasons. In July 2019 it was announced that Leslie was leaving the show and would not be returning for its fourth season.

In 2017, Leslie provided the voice for the female protagonist "En" in the video game Echo, a game by Copenhagen-based game developer Ultra Ultra.

In October 2019 Leslie was cast as Louise Bourget in Kenneth Branagh's adaptation of Agatha Christie's novel Death on The Nile. The film was released on 11 February 2022.

In January 2020, Leslie joined the cast of BBC's and World Productions's drama series Vigil, which premiered in 2021.

In February 2021, Leslie was cast in HBO's The Time Traveler's Wife TV series based on the novel by Audrey Niffenegger, starring as Clare Abshire alongside Theo James as Henry DeTamble.

In 2024, Leslie appeared in the BBC series Miss Austen as the character of Isabella Fowle. Miss Austen is a BBC adaptation of a novel, in which Isabella is the daughter of Jane Austen's close family friend.

In 2025, Leslie starred as Constance in Laura Wade's adaptation of The Constant Wife at the Royal Shakespeare Company's Swan Theatre.

== Personal life ==
Leslie became fluent in French while living with her family in France during her pre-adolescent years. While working as an actress, she lived in Battersea, London, until moving to north London. She has great fondness for Aberdeenshire, saying, "I feel very much at peace in Scotland."

In 2011, Leslie began dating Kit Harington, who played her love interest, Jon Snow, in Game of Thrones. They married on 23 June 2018. In September 2020, Leslie posed for a magazine photo shoot while visibly pregnant. Their son was born in January 2021. In February 2023, Harington announced that they were expecting their second child. In July 2023, the couple confirmed the birth of their daughter.

=== Politics and other interests ===
Leslie supported Scotland’s No campaign during the 2014 Scottish independence referendum campaign. At the 2015 UK general election, she campaigned with the Conservative Party in her local constituency of Gordon.

She is a runner and enjoys rock climbing, cooking, skiing, archery, and tennis.

She is a patron of the charity Firefly International.

== Filmography ==
=== Film ===
Key
†	Denotes films that have not yet been released

Year	Title	Role	Notes	Ref.
2012	Now Is Good	Fiona		
2014	Honeymoon	Bea		
2015	The Last Witch Hunter	Chloe		
2016	The Backup Dancer	Athena	US title: Sticky Notes	
2016	Morgan	Amy Menser		
2022	Death on the Nile	Louise		
2027	The Last Druid †	TBA	Post-production	
TBA	The Custom of the Country †	TBA	Filming	

=== Television ===
Year	Title	Role	Notes	Ref.
2008	Banged Up Abroad	Kim	Episode: "Lima"	
2009	New Town	Rhian	Television film	
2010, 2015	Downton Abbey	Gwen Dawson	Main role (series 1); guest role (series 6)	
2011	Case Histories	Laura Wyre	2 episodes	
2012	Vera	Lena Holgate	Episode: "The Ghost Position"	
2012–2014	Game of Thrones	Ygritte	Recurring role (season 2); main role (seasons 3–4)	
2014	Blandings	Niagra Donaldson	Episode: "Custody of the Pumpkin"	
2014	Utopia	Young Milner	Episode #2.1	
2014	The Great Fire	Sarah Farriner	4 episodes	
2015	Luther	Emma Lane	Series 4	
2016	Revolting Rhymes	Red Riding Hood (voice)	2 episodes	
2017–2019	The Good Fight	Maia Rindell	Main role (seasons 1–3)	
2019	Saturday Night Live	Herself	Episode: "Kit Harington / Sara Bareilles"	
2021–present	Vigil	Kirsten Longacre	Main role (seasons 1–3)	
2022	The Time Traveler's Wife	Clare	Main role	
2024	Miss Austen	Isabella Fowle	Main role	
2025	The Hack	Charlotte Harris	Supporting role	

=== Video game ===
Year	Title	Role	Ref.
2017	Echo	En	

== Theatre ==
Year	Title	Role	Venue / touring theatre	Director	Ref
2005–2015	Mixed Up North		Touring; Wilton's Music Hall; Octagon Theatre	Max Stafford-Clark	
2005–2015	Romeo and Juliet		Love and Madness Company	John Link	
2005–2015	Can-Can		LAMDA	Anne Durham	
2005–2015	Pericles		LAMDA	Rodney Cottier	
2005–2015	The Learned Ladies		LAMDA	Jenny Lipman	
2005–2015	The Caucasian Chalk Circle		Touring; Out of Joint Theatre Company; MacOwan Theatre	John Baxter	
2005–2015	Breaking Barriers in Burnley		Out of Joint Theatre Company	Robin Soans & Clark	
2005–2015	Uncle Vanya		LAMDA	Colin Cook	
2005–2015	Antigone		LAMDA	Mark Bell kings	
2005–2015	The Children's Monologues		Royal Court Theatre	Danny Boyle	
2005–2015	Bedlam		Globe Theatre	Nell Leyshon	
2025	The Constant Wife	Constance	Stratford Swan Theatre	Tamara Harvey	

== Awards and nominations ==
Year	Award	Category	Work	Result	Ref.
2009	British Academy Scotland New Talent Awards	Best Acting Performance	New Town	Won	
2013	Screen Actors Guild Award	Outstanding Performance by an Ensemble in a Drama Series (shared with the cast)	Game of Thrones	Nominated	
