= Hailey McCann =

American actress

- Born: October 3, 1995 (age 30); Riverside, California, U.S.
- Occupation: Actress
- Years active: 2003–2009

Hailey McCann (born October 3, 1995) is a former American child actress, active from 2003 to 2009. McCann was born in Riverside, California, one of four children, having two sisters and a brother. She played her first role in the 2003 short film Give or Take an Inch, while her last recorded role was the 2009 short film The Cleaner. In the movie The Time Traveler's Wife she appeared alongside her younger sister, Tatum McCann, in scenes playing the same character at different ages.

== Filmography ==
- 2003: Give or Take an Inch (short film)
- 2006: Jericho (TV series, episode Federal Response)
- 2006: Jimmy Kimmel Live! (TV series, episode Jimmy and Sal Celebrate Cousins' Day)
- 2007: The Grand
- 2007: Punk'd (TV series, 2 episodes)
- 2009: The Time Traveler's Wife
- 2009: The Cleaner (short film)
