= Conan the Librarian =

Recurring parody of Conan the Barbarian

Conan the Librarian is a parody of Robert E. Howard's Conan the Barbarian that has become a literary trope, and has appeared in various media, including film, radio, television, comics, and fan fiction. Based on the similarity in the sound of the word "librarian" to "barbarian", and their near opposite meanings, the phrase is a parodic coinage, and its origins and recurrence are likely due to both independent invention and imitation. There is no evidence that the character has an origin in Monty Python's Flying Circus in the 1970s.

The trope has received criticism from author and librarian Ashanti White for perpetuating the stereotype of the "cantankerous librarian", noting that the image was prominent in a Google Image search. The term has also been used as a descriptor both favorably and unfavorably by outlets such as The New York Times.

== Appearances ==
This listing is not exhaustive.

=== Television ===
- You Can't Do That on Television (1982). Conan the Librarian was featured on the comedy show You Can't Do That on Television in the 1982 episode "Heroes".
- Reading Rainbow (1986). Conan the Librarian (voiced by Eric Bogosian) appears in a sketch on a 1986 episode ("Alistair in Outer Space") of the children's television series Reading Rainbow. Unlike the UHF Conan (see below), Conan the Librarian is helpful and shows someone how to get a library card. This character was later the subject of a proposed television pilot.

=== Radio ===
- The Frantics (1983). The Canadian comedy troupe The Frantics featured Conan the Librarian in the lead sketch of Frantic Times show #51, "Roman Numerals", broadcast on CBC Radio's Variety Tonight programme in February, 1983. Conan was portrayed as a fierce warrior "roaming the wastelands between fiction and non-fiction", who slaughters a client for having a book overdue.

=== Comics ===
- Conan the Librarian (1980) The first printed appearance of Conan the Librarian may have been in the September 15, 1980 in Venue Magazine, at Glassboro State College (now Rowan University). Art by Mark Drossman, story by Bob Minadeo. It was reprinted in 1982 in the Henry Holt & Company collection of college humor from the 1970s and early 1980s, Hellbent on Insanity.
- Mother Goose and Grimm (1987). Probably the next printed Conan the Librarian appearance is in a 1987 Mother Goose and Grimm comic. Ham the pig, returning a book to the "Overdue Books" section, gazes apprehensively across the desk at a scowling and muscle-bound librarian, in typical Conan the Barbarian dress, but identified as "Conan the Librarian" by the placard on the desk.

=== Film ===
- UHF (1989). Conan the Librarian also appears in a brief segment of the 1989 "Weird Al" Yankovic film UHF. Portrayed by Roger Callard, the exaggeratedly muscular character speaks in Austrian-accented English patterned after Arnold Schwarzenegger's portrayal of Conan. He chastises a library patron for not knowing the Dewey Decimal System, and slices a patron in two for returning a book overdue.

=== Fan fiction ===
- Hadley V. Baxendale (1987). In 1987, William Mitchell College of Law library staff created the character Conan the Librarian for a talent show performance and subsequently wrote The Adventures of Conan the Librarian. This was followed by The Return of Conan the Librarian and Conan the Librarian on the Information Highway. The author of these stories is the fictitious "Hadley V. Baxendale" (a pun on the famous law case Hadley v. Baxendale). This Conan is an ordinary librarian who lives in the mythical "Information Age".

=== Software ===
- Conan The Librarian, the OpenVMS HELP tool (2002). Mark Daniel wrote a script known as Conan the Librarian that makes OpenVMS Help and Text libraries accessible in the hypertext environment. It also provides a keyword search facility, both from a search dialog on relevant pages, and using a URL query string.

=== People ===
- Librarian John Szabo earned the nickname "Conan the Librarian" due to his fierce style in running the library in his East Quad residence hall at the University of Michigan.

== Variations ==
- Colin the Librarian (1993). A variation of the character called "Colin the Librarian" was created by Rich Parsons and Tony Keaveny for their novel Colin the Librarian: The Chronicles of Ancient Threa - ~~Volume 3~~ or Maybe Volume 4 (London : Michael O'Mara, 1993). A different Colin the Librarian later appeared in the juvenile novel Colin the Librarian by Merv Lambert (Luton: Andrews UK Limited, 2012).
- Dr. Conan T Barbarian (2011). In higher academia rather than librarianship. Full name: Dr. Conan T Barbarian, BA (Cimmeria) PhD. (UCD). FTCD (Long Room Hub Associate Professor in Hyborian Studies and Tyrant Slaying). In 2011 a faculty profile for Dr. Conan T Barbarian appeared on the Trinity College Dublin School of English website. In his academic history it was said that his PhD was entitled 'To Hear The Lamentation of Their Women: Constructions of Masculinity in Contemporary Zamoran Literature' and that he had earned his position by 'successfully decapitating his predecessor during a bloody battle which will long be remembered in legend and song' in 2006. The entry was removed by the college administration on September 14, 2011, after a day of being viewable on the website.

== See also ==
- Cohen the Barbarian, another Conan parody
- The Librarian (franchise), Noah Wyle stars as the Indiana Jones-like librarian
- Librarians in popular culture
