= Raven Girl =

2013 novel by Audrey Niffenegger

- Author: Audrey Niffenegger
- Language: English
- Genre: Folk literature
- Publisher: Harry N. Abrams
- Publication date: May 2, 2013
- Media type: Print (hardback)
- Pages: 80
- ISBN: 9781419707261

Raven Girl is a 2013 novel written and illustrated by Audrey Niffenegger.

== Summary ==
A lonely Postman who delivers for Her Majesty's Postal Service lives all alone. One rainy day in April, the Postman is tasked with delivering a letter stamped Special Delivery and the postcode listed as EE1LH9, which his supervisor explains stands for "East of East, Lower Heights", an address on his walk.

Perplexed, the Postman walks two hours until he reaches his destination: an enormous nest on the ledge of a cliff. The Postman looks down and sees a female fledging Raven that has fallen out of the nest. Mistaking the Postman for a cat as they had never seen people before, the Raven's brothers try to warn her before the Postman takes her home. The Raven's parents are distraught over the loss of their daughter and fly around asking all the cats they meet for her whereabouts, but they all deny taking her.

At the Postman's house, the Raven misses her family, but becomes friends with the Postman as he takes care of her. As the Raven grows up, she learns some human words and does tricks for the Postman. Come summer, the Raven becomes fully grown, but chooses to live with the Postman as the two have fallen in love. The Postman and the Raven marry and she lays an unusual egg: the longer she incubates it, the bigger it grows. Months pass by and out of the egg hatches the Postman and the Raven's daughter, the Raven Girl, who looks human, but has hollow bones and croaks like her mother instead of talking like humans.

The Raven Girl grows up behaving like a bird; she yearns to fly despite having arms instead of wings. One day, the Raven Girl meets a Cat to whom she tells of her nature. The Cat then visits the Court of Ravens and tells the King and the Queen about the Raven Girl. Although they suspect the Raven Girl's mother to be the same young raven who disappeared years ago, the ravens don't believe in the Cat.

The Raven Girl goes to school, but never makes friends and she only communicates with her classmates and their teachers with notes. When the Raven Girl graduates from school and turns 18, her father lies to the University Admissions Board that she is mute. The Raven Girl gets admitted on a scholarship for the disabled, and her parents help her move to her dorm. At university, the Raven Girl remains friendless and the city birds avoid her even though she could speak to them. She builds a nest on her bed to deal with homesickness, and her roommate finds her odd. A Boy who takes the same biology class as the Raven Girl falls in love with her, but she doesn't return his feelings. One day, the biology professor welcomes a special guest: a Doctor who is an expert on Chimeras. The Doctor shows the class images of human-animal hybrids, shocking most of them and intriguing the Raven Girl. When class is dismissed, the Raven Girl asks the Doctor to make her into a bird and he tells her to see him on Wednesday.

On Wednesday, the Raven Girl visits the Doctor, telling him of her parentage and of her desire to have wings, even letting him lift her up for him to see her bones are hollow. Eager to make the Raven Girl's dream come true, the Doctor promises to operate on her at his hospital. The Raven Girl stops taking her classes, and the Boy becomes an amateur detective to find her, having become obsessed with her. One day, the Doctor shows the Raven Girl a huge pair of biologically-engineered raven wings that he will replace her arms with. The Boy Detective eventually finds the Raven Girl at the hospital, but runs away after seeing that her arms have been amputated by the Doctor in preparation for her surgery.

The Doctor successfully attaches the Raven Girl's wings to her body. Weeks later, the Boy Detective shows up at the hospital with the Raven Girl's parents who are surprised to see her new wings. The Boy Detective, however, mistakenly believes the Doctor is hurting the Raven Girl and in the confusion, he pushes him out of the window, killing him; the Raven Girl jumps out the same window and becomes airborne, and the Boy Detective runs away. At the Doctor's funeral, the Raven Girl waits until the mourners have left to place one of her feathers on his grave, thanking him for granting her wish. The police search for the Boy Detective to arrest him for murdering the Doctor, but they are unable to find him and the case goes cold.

The Raven Girl's parents take her home and the Cat informs the Court of Ravens of her new form and of the Doctor's murder. The Raven Girl's maternal grandparents are happy to know their daughter is alive and the Raven King and Queen order that the Boy Detective be punished for his crime. A conspiracy of ravens carry the Boy Detective away and he is never seen again.

The Raven Prince, intrigued by the existence of a human/raven hybrid girl, visits the Postman's house one day in June and the family welcomes him.

The Raven Girl and the Raven Prince fall in love and live happily ever after.

== Reception ==
Douglas Wolk of The Washington Post said of the book "the happy ending that the story cuts corners to reach feels as hollow as a bird’s bones." A review from NPR noted that the book "like the sad creature at its center, lingers in the memory: odd, quiet, more than a little unsettling, but strangely, even hauntingly, beautiful."

== Adaptation ==
In 2013, The Royal Ballet asked Niffenegger to adapt the book into a ballet which was performed at the Royal Opera House.
