= Sticky Notes (film) =

- Film poster
- Directed by: Amanda Sharp
- Screenplay by: Amanda Sharp
- Story by: Amanda Sharp
- Produced by: Katie Mustard; Frankie Lindquist; Cassian Elwes
- Starring: Ray Liotta; Rose Leslie; Gina Rodriguez; Justin Bartha
- Cinematography: Alex Disenhof
- Edited by: Amy E. Duddleston; Blake Maniquis
- Music by: Nathan Halpern
- Production companies: Mustard & Co
- Release dates: June 18, 2016 (Edinburgh International Film Festival); February 1, 2017
- Running time: 90 minutes
- Country: United States
- Language: English

Sticky Notes, also known as The Backup Dancer, is a 2016 American drama film written and directed by Amanda Sharp, produced by Katie Mustard, and starring Ray Liotta, Rose Leslie, Gina Rodriguez and Justin Bartha. The film centers around Athena (Leslie), a backup dancer who returns home to Florida, to help care for her estranged father Jack (Liotta), who has been diagnosed with cancer.

== Cast ==
- Ray Liotta as Jack
- Rose Leslie as Athena
- Gina Rodriguez as Natalia
- Justin Bartha as Bryan

== Production ==
The film was directed by Amanda Sharp in her directorial debut.
