= The Time Traveler's Wife (film) =

2009 film by Robert Schwentke

- Theatrical release poster
- Directed by: Robert Schwentke
- Screenplay by: Bruce Joel Rubin
- Based on: The Time Traveler's Wife by Audrey Niffenegger
- Produced by: Nick Wechsler; Dede Gardner
- Starring: Rachel McAdams; Eric Bana; Arliss Howard; Ron Livingston
- Cinematography: Florian Ballhaus
- Edited by: Thom Noble
- Music by: Mychael Danna
- Production companies: New Line Cinema; Plan B Entertainment
- Distributed by: Warner Bros. Pictures
- Release date: August 14, 2009
- Running time: 107 minutes
- Country: United States
- Language: English
- Budget: $39 million
- Box office: $101.3 million

The Time Traveler's Wife is a 2009 American romantic science fiction tragedy film based on Audrey Niffenegger's 2003 novel. Directed by Robert Schwentke, the film stars Eric Bana, Rachel McAdams, and Ron Livingston. The story follows Henry DeTamble (Bana), a Chicago librarian with a paranormal genetic disorder that causes him to randomly time travel. He tries to build a romantic relationship with Clare Abshire (McAdams), whom he meets when she is a child, and who later becomes his wife.

Filming began in September 2007, originally in anticipation of a fall 2008 release. The film's release was postponed with initially no official explanation from the studio. McAdams later noted that the delay was due to additional scenes and reshoots that could not be completed until the season at their outdoor location matched previously filmed footage, and Bana had regrown his hair following his work on the 2009 film Star Trek. Produced by New Line Cinema, the film was released on August 14, 2009, by Warner Bros. Pictures to mixed reviews but was a commercial success.

== Plot ==
In the early 1970s, Henry DeTamble is in a car accident that kills his mother, Annette DeTamble, but he survives by inadvertently time-traveling back two weeks. Moments later, Henry is helped by an older version of himself who has also traveled back. Unable to control the timing or destinations of his traveling, Henry finds himself drawn to significant people, places, and events in his life but is incapable of changing events beyond the minor differences his presence creates.

In 1991, Henry meets Clare Abshire in the library where he works. She is overjoyed to see him although he is meeting her for the first time. Clare explains that she met Henry's future self when she was a child and that he informed her then that they would meet in the future, which is happening now.

As a child, Clare develops a crush on Henry, and she is upset to learn that he is married. When she turns 18, two years before their meeting at the library, the older Henry kisses her, leading her to realize that he is her husband in the future. They begin a relationship, which is challenged by Henry's disorder.

Henry's sporadic time traveling is further complicated by the fact that he arrives at his destinations completely naked. From an early age, he had learned how to pick locks and steal clothing to endure his travels. Among his getaways are many visits to young Clare.

From present-day Clare's diary, Henry gets a list of dates when he visited her and gives those to young Clare so that she can be waiting for him with clothes. Clare eventually marries him. Henry time travels away before the ceremony and a visibly older version of himself arrives in time to step in.

Henry's disappearances take a toll on his relationship with Clare. To make up for this, Henry buys a winning lottery ticket due to having the numbers in advance, but their relationship still has problems. He and Clare witness a middle-aged wounded Henry briefly arrive from another time, leaving them concerned about how long Henry will live.

His disorder also makes having a child with Clare seemingly impossible, as Henry's genes cause their unborn fetuses to time travel. They seek a renowned doctor's help, but after numerous similar miscarriages, Henry has a secret vasectomy to end their suffering. However, soon after, Clare gets pregnant one last time—by a visiting younger version of Henry—and carries the baby to full term.

Before the child is born, Henry travels forward in time and happily meets their pre-teen daughter, Alba. She tells him that she is a time traveler, too, but has increasing control over when and where she travels. Alba tells Henry that he will die when she is five years old, a fact he subsequently hides from Clare.

Alba's pre-teen self, who ultimately tries to prepare her younger self for Henry's death, visits young Alba sporadically. During Alba's fifth birthday party with family and friends, Clare is devastated to discover Henry's impending death. Later, after suffering from severe frostbite from a time jump gone wrong and temporarily using a wheelchair, Henry time travels again and is accidentally shot by Clare's father, who is hunting elk.

Henry returns in time to die in Clare's arms. Some years later, a younger Henry visits Alba and Clare, giving Clare hope that he will visit again. However, he tells her not to spend her life waiting for him, hoping this encounter would provide a proper closure for Clare and Alba.

== Cast ==
- Rachel McAdams as Clare Abshire
  - Brooklynn Proulx as young Clare
- Eric Bana as Henry DeTamble
  - Alex Ferris as young Henry
- Arliss Howard as Richard DeTamble, Henry's father
- Ron Livingston as Gomez, Henry and Clare's friend
- Stephen Tobolowsky as Dr. Kendrick
- Michelle Nolden as Annette DeTamble, Henry's mother
- Jane McLean as Charisse, Clare's best friend
- Hailey McCann as Alba
  - Tatum McCann as young Alba

In addition, Fiona Reid, Philip Craig, Maggie Castle and Brian Bisson play Clare's parents and siblings, respectively. The wedding band is played by Broken Social Scene.

== Production ==
The film rights for Audrey Niffenegger's 2003 novel The Time Traveler's Wife were optioned by Jennifer Aniston and Brad Pitt's production company Plan B Entertainment, in association with New Line Cinema, before the work was even published. Niffenegger stated in an interview that as she was writing the book, she had thoughts of how a film version of the book would appear. When asked about the prospect of her novel being turned into a film, Niffenegger said, "I've got my little movie that runs in my head. And I'm kind of afraid that will be changed or wiped out by what somebody else might do with it. And it is sort of thrilling and creepy because now the characters have an existence apart from me."

In September 2003, New Line Cinema hired screenwriter Jeremy Leven to write an adapted screenplay of the novel. Directors Steven Spielberg and David Fincher briefly expressed interest in the project, though no negotiations took place. In March 2005, director Gus Van Sant entered negotiations with New Line Cinema to helm the project. The negotiations did not hold, and in November 2006, director Robert Schwentke was instead hired to take over the project.

In January 2007, New Line Cinema hired screenwriter Bruce Joel Rubin to rewrite Leven's script. Eric Bana and Rachel McAdams were cast in April 2007. Filming began in Toronto on September 10, 2007. It was also shot in Hamilton, Ontario. The film was originally planned for a fall 2008 release, but it was postponed with no official explanation from the studio. When asked about the delay, McAdams said, "We wound up doing a reshoot, and Eric was the holdup … He had to shave his head for a different role, for Star Trek, I think … We did an additional scene in the meadow, so we were also waiting on the meadow to look the way it did [the first time we shot]. So we were waiting on the seasons. Basically, we were waiting on nature and Eric's hair." The film was released by Warner Bros. Pictures on August 14, 2009.

== Music ==
The score to The Time Traveler's Wife was composed by Mychael Danna, who recorded his score with the Hollywood Studio Symphony at the Ocean Way Studios during the fall of 2008. The official motion picture soundtrack was released as a download on August 11, 2009, by New Line Records.

== Reception ==
=== Critical response ===
Based on 154 reviews collected by Rotten Tomatoes, The Time Traveler's Wife has a 38% approval rating from critics, with an average score of 5.10/10. The consensus reads, "Though it may satisfy fans of the novel, The Time Traveler's Wife's plot's contrivances and illogical narrative hamper its big screen effectiveness". Metacritic, which uses a weighted average, assigned the film a score of 47 out of 100, based on 31 critics, indicating "mixed or average" reviews.

=== Box office ===
The film opened third behind District 9 and G.I. Joe: The Rise of Cobra, grossing $19.2 million on its opening weekend.

== Home media ==
The film was released on DVD and Blu-ray on February 9, 2010, by New Line Home Entertainment. This is the last film that New Line distributed on DVD by itself. After this release, New Line films began to be distributed on home media by Warner Home Video, which absorbed New Line Home Entertainment in 2010, after New Line was absorbed by Warner Bros. Pictures in 2008.

== See also ==
- List of films featuring time loops
- Reversi (2024), Malaysian film inspired by this movie
- About Time (2013 film)
- The Time Traveler's Wife (TV series)
