= Her Fearful Symmetry =

2009 horror novel by Audrey Niffenegger

- First edition cover
- Author: Audrey Niffenegger
- Audio read by: Bianca Amato
- Cover artist: Chris Frazer Smith; Charlotte Rea; Captureworx; Millennium Images
- Language: English
- Genre: Horror
- Publisher: Random House
- Publication date: 2009
- Publication place: United States
- Media type: Print (hardcover)
- Pages: 304 (first edition)
- ISBN: 9780099524175
- OCLC: 317923485

Her Fearful Symmetry is a horror novel by the American writer Audrey Niffenegger. The book was published on October 1, 2009 and is set in and around London's Highgate Cemetery where, after a year of research for the book, Niffenegger acted as a tour guide.

== Title ==
The novel's title is inspired by William Blake's poem "The Tyger", which begins "Tyger! Tyger! burning bright / In the forests of the night, / What immortal hand or eye / Could frame thy fearful symmetry?".

Given the novel's setting, some critics have also pointed out a potential verbal pun in the novel's title, since in received pronunciation "symmetry" and "cemetery" are quite similarly pronounced. There is also a physical symmetry between two of the main characters – identical twins with mirrored internal organs.

== Plot summary ==
Elspeth dies of leukemia. Her apartment, located beside Highgate cemetery in London, is left for the daughters of Edwina, her estranged twin sister. Elspeth's nieces, identical twins Julia and Valentina, do everything together, though Julia is the more dominant twin. Valentina has asthma and has a heart valve that has not been properly formed, which occasionally makes her ill. The sisters move to London and take up residence in Elspeth's flat. Robert, Elspeth's former lover, lives in the apartment below them. Robert is employed as a tour guide in the cemetery as a way of learning more for his thesis work on the cemetery. Valentina begins falling in love with Robert and he quickly reciprocates, primarily because of her resemblance to Elspeth.

Martin, a man whose wife, Marijke, has left him because of his obsessive compulsive disorder (OCD), lives in the apartment above. Julia befriends Martin and gives him Anafranil (a pill for OCD), pretending that it is a vitamin. Martin is aware that she is giving him the medication, but feigns ignorance.

Unknown to either of the sisters for the first year they are in London, Elspeth is trapped inside the apartment as a ghost—invisible and completely mute. However, Valentina discovers her awareness of Elspeth's moods. One day, she sees Elspeth in the apartment. The twins find a stray kitten near the cemetery. After several failed attempts, they lure it into their apartment and begin taking care of the kitten. One day, while playing with the twins, the kitten abruptly drops dead. The twins realize that the kitten's soul had been caught on Elspeth's hand. Elspeth puts the kitten's soul back into its body and is able to bring it back to life.

A recurring theme throughout the story is Valentina's discontent with being one half of a whole (her twinship with Julia). She is the weaker twin both physically (given her illness) and emotionally. Julia calls Valentina "Mouse" because of her fearful attitude towards everything. As the story progresses, Valentina becomes emotionally stronger and decides she must break away from Julia to be able to live her life.

Valentina plans to fake her own death. She asks her aunt to temporarily remove her soul and instructs Robert to preserve her body. Horrified, Robert refuses to participate. He decides to read the diaries and letters that Elspeth left him when she died. He finds out that there was no rift between Edwina and Elspeth, but rather a secret they shared that made it impossible for them to be together again: for decades, the two women have been assuming each other's identity. The recently deceased "Elspeth" (actually Edwina) is the mother of Julia and Valentina. Decades ago, Elspeth was engaged to Jack, an American working in London. Insecure about their relationship, she pretended to be Edwina and made advances toward Jack to test him. Jack knew that she was not Edwina, but played along anyway. On April Fool's Day, Jack and (the real) Edwina become intoxicated at a party and later have sex, which Jack was too inebriated to remember.

Thereafter, Elspeth marries Jack, but it was actually Edwina who moved to America with him, and gave birth to Julia and Valentina. When the girls were four months old, Edwina brought them to London, and they switched places so that Elspeth could be together with Jack. Edwina had been living away from her children until her death.

Later, Valentina, Robert, and Elspeth proceed with the plan. "Elspeth" removes and holds onto Valentina's soul. Robert then makes it appear as if an asthma attack killed Valentina. Julia discovers Valentina's body and is devastated. A funeral is held with Valentina's coffin being interred in the family mausoleum in Highgate Cemetery. Later that day, Robert retrieves the body and takes it to his flat. When Valentina's body is woken up, Robert discovers that the soul inside Valentina is "Elspeth." She tells Robert that Valentina's soul has dispersed, and that she decided to take over the body.

Valentina then becomes a ghost trapped inside the apartment. Julia continues living there, hoping to one day see her as Valentina had seen Elspeth. Eventually, the sisters are able to communicate with one another, and Valentina learns how to leave the apartment. While Julia remains sad for her sister's fate, Valentina is now free and happy.

Eventually, Martin moves out of his apartment and his son Theo moves in. Soon after, Julia and Theo begin dating.

One day, after a run in with Julia who is suspicious but uncertain, "Elspeth" (in Valentina's body) informs Robert that they need to leave London. She proposes moving to Sussex, where she has always wanted to live. Robert realizes that "Elspeth" is abusive and manipulative - always getting her way, which brings about harsh feelings among the family. They move to Sussex, where the relationship between Robert and "Elspeth" deteriorates with Robert ignoring her most of the time. "Elspeth" delivers a baby boy and one day, shortly after the child is born, she returns to their little cottage after a walk and discovers that Robert's thesis has been completed and is lying on the table. Robert has vanished, never to return.

== Critical reception ==
AudioFile magazine called Niffenegger "a master storyteller" and praised her "skill in bringing plausibility to the unthinkable" as well as audiobook narrator Bianca Amato's narration. In a generally unfavorable review, The Guardian commented that "... this is the novelistic equivalent of a cut-rate séance, a parlour game complete with Ouija boards and cheap theatrics, as unconvincing as knuckles rapping under tables."
