= Susan Fisher Sterling =

American art curator and gallery director

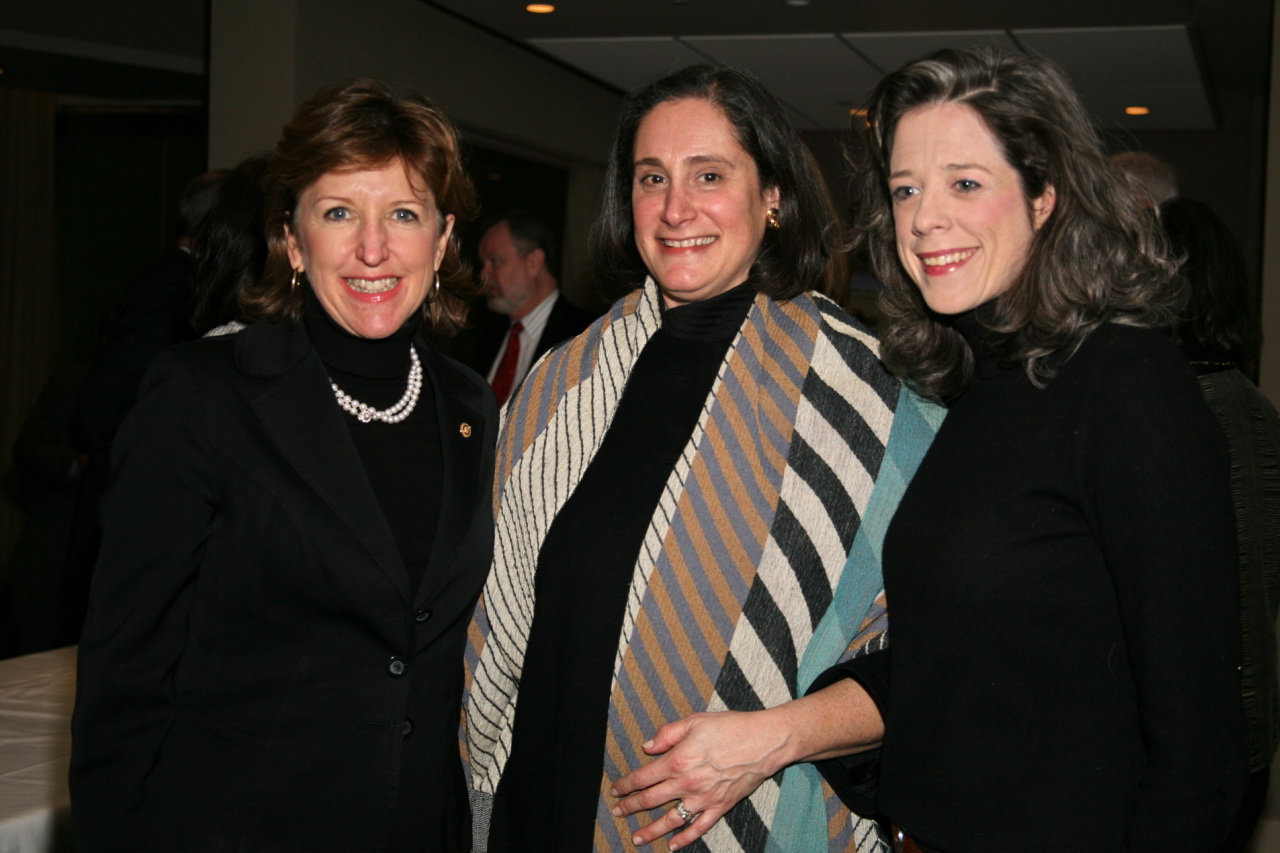
- Senator Kay Hagan of North Carolina, Susan Fisher Sterling and Heather Podesta at a party in Washington, D.C. in 2009
- Education: Washington University in St. Louis; Princeton University (MA) (PhD)
- Occupation: Curator

Susan Fisher Sterling is an American art curator, currently the Director of the National Museum of Women in the Arts in Washington, D.C. She has been an activist in the Feminist art movement in the United States since the early 1980s.

== Education ==
Sterling holds a Master's and Ph.D. in Art History from Princeton University, and specialized in Modern and Contemporary art.

== Career ==
Sterling became an associate curator of the National Museum of Women in the Arts in 1988. Two years later, she was promoted to curator of modern and contemporary art, and again to chief curator in 1994. She became deputy director in 2001, and finally Director of the National Museum of Women in the Arts in 2008, and has held the position since.

== Awards ==
Sterling was awarded Orders of Merit from Brazil and Norway. She was awarded the President's Award by the Women's Caucus for Art in 2009. In 2011, she received Airtable's 30th Honor's award.
