= Audrey Niffenegger =

American writer, artist and academic (born 1963)

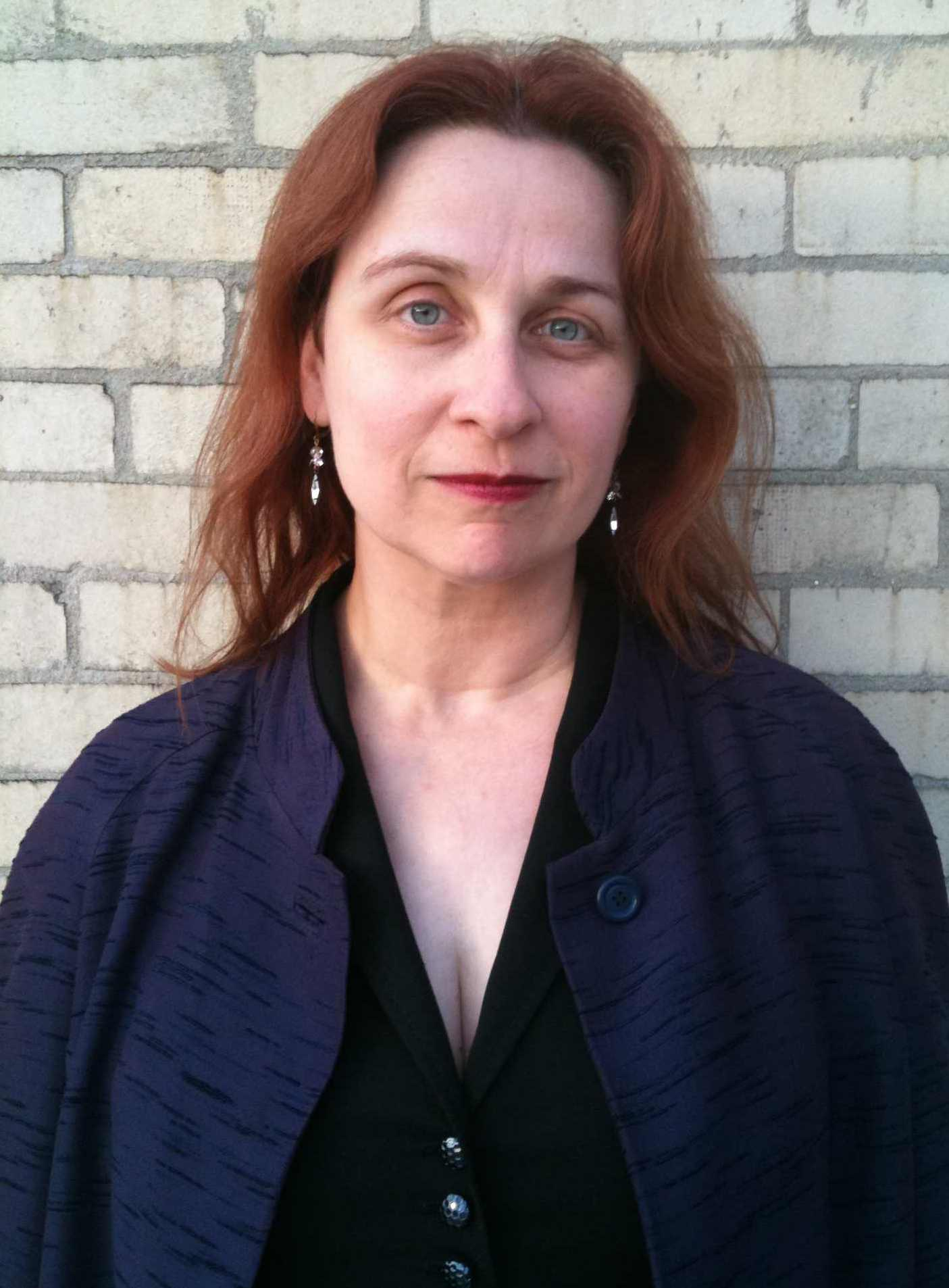
- Niffenegger in 2009
- Born: June 13, 1963 (age 63); South Haven, Michigan, U.S.
- Education: Art Institute of Chicago (BFA); Northwestern University (MFA)
- Occupations: Novelist; artist; academic
- Spouse: Eddie Campbell
- Writing career
- Period: 2003–present
- Genre: Fiction
- Notable awards: Inkpot Award (2019)
- Audrey Niffenegger's voice Recorded July 2013 from the BBC Radio 4 program Bookclub
- Website: audreyniffenegger.com

Audrey Niffenegger (born June 13, 1963) is an American writer, artist, and academic. Her debut novel, The Time Traveler's Wife, published in 2003, was a bestseller.

== Biography ==
Audrey Niffenegger was born in 1963 in South Haven, Michigan. At the age of two, she and her family moved to Evanston, Illinois, and she has since spent the majority of her life living in or close to Chicago. Niffenegger started writing books when she was six years old. Niffenegger completed her undergraduate degree at the Art Institute of Chicago where she worked on becoming a visual artist. After completing her undergraduate degree, she got her M.F.A at Northwestern University. From 1994 to 2015, Niffenegger served on the faculty of the Creative Writing Department at Columbia College Chicago, where she co-founded the Columbia College Chicago Center for the Book and Paper Arts.

Niffenegger is also the founding member of T3 or Text 3, an artist and writer's group which performs and exhibits in Chicago. She is an alumna and board member of the Ragdale Foundation. She started making books herself by using processes such as intaglio and letterpress. She also wrote many novels which were produced on an offset press.

She founded Artists Book House. In 2024, Niffenegger announced that the center's home would be built in the Old Irving Park neighborhood.

From June 21 to November 10, 2013, the National Museum of Women in the Arts exhibited Awake in the Dream World: The Art of Audrey Niffenegger, a retrospective of her paintings, drawings, prints, and book art that “reflect her captivating narrative talent and her explorations of life, mortality, and magic.” The catalog was written by Niffenegger with Susan Fisher Sterling, Krystyna Wasserman, and Mark Pascale.

== Works ==
=== Novels ===
Niffenegger's debut novel, The Time Traveler's Wife, was published in 2003 and was a bestseller. A film adaptation was released in 2009. Niffenegger has no intention of watching the movie because she stated that the characters are only truly hers in the book, not in the movie. Niffenegger originally conceptualized The Time Traveler's Wife as a graphic novel but realized that the time travel would be difficult to capture in visualizations. In March 2009, Niffenegger sold her second novel, a literary ghost story called Her Fearful Symmetry, to Charles Scribner's Sons for an advance of $5 million. The book was released on October 1, 2009 and is set in London's Highgate Cemetery where, during research for the book, Niffenegger acted as a tour guide. Though not as big a commercial success as The Time Traveler's Wife, the book garnered positive critical reviews.

Niffenegger collaborated with Wayne McGregor on a balletic fable, Raven Girl (2013), performed at the Royal Opera House in London in 2013, 2015.

In 2009, she started working on a novel called The Chinchilla Girl in Exile.

In 2013, it was announced that there would be a sequel to The Time Traveler's Wife and in 2022 it was announced that title is The Other Husband set to be released in 2023. It was renamed as Life Out of Order, and follows the story of Alba, the child of the original novel's protagonists. It was published in October 2026.

=== Visual books ===
Niffenegger has degrees from the Art Institute of Chicago and Northwestern University. As an undergraduate student at the Art Institute of Chicago, Niffenegger created her own book arts major combining etching, letterpress arts and bookbinding. Her first project was called The Adventuress, which she self-described as "a novel in pictures". Niffenegger's second novel in pictures was titled The Three Incestuous Sisters which she created while completing her M.F.A. at Northwestern. These two novels in pictures were subsequently published by Harry N. Abrams. The Three Incestuous Sisters was published in 2005 and tells the story of three unusual sisters who live in a seaside house; the book has been compared to the work of Edward Gorey. The Adventuress was released on September 1, 2006.

The 2004 short story "The Night Bookmobile" was serialized in 2008 in "Visual Novel" format in The Guardian. "The Night Bookmobile" was published on October 1, 2010, by Jonathan Cape. Niffenegger intends "The Night Bookmobile" to be the first installment in a series titled "The Library". She is working on the second installment, called "Moths of the New World", about a stolen book.

== Personal life ==
Niffenegger is married to cartoonist Eddie Campbell. Niffenegger and Campbell collaborated on the visual novel Bizarre Romance to celebrate the Comics Unmasked exhibit at the British Library.

Niffenegger describes herself as "somewhere in the spectrum of agnosticism and atheism" and ascribes her disbelief to her Catholic background.

== List of published works ==
=== Novels ===
- The Time Traveler's Wife (2003) (ISBN 978-0-156-02943-8)
- Her Fearful Symmetry (2009) (ISBN 978-0-099-52417-5)
- Raven Girl (2013) (ISBN 978-1-419-70726-1)
- Life Out of Order (2026) (ISBN 978-1-335-00322-5)

=== Short stories ===
- "Jakob Wywialowski and the Angels" (2004, ASIN B0DV7TG9FX)
- "Prudence: The Cautionary Tale of a Picky Eater" in the book Poisonous Plants at Table (2006, ASIN B001L7V5N2)

=== Comics ===
- The Night Bookmobile (2008) (2010 edition ISBN 978-0-224-08952-4)
- Bizarre Romance (with Eddie Campbell, Abrams, 2018) (ISBN 978-1-419-72853-2)

=== Artist's books ===
Visual books:

- The Adventuress (1985) (ISBN 978-0-810-97052-6)
- The Spinster (1986) (ASIN B0006ER3ZU)
- Aberrant Abecedarium (1986)
- The Murderer (1986)
- Spring (1994)
- The Three Incestuous Sisters (2005) (ISBN 978-0-224-07686-9)

=== Non-fiction ===
- Awake in the Dream World: The Art of Audrey Niffenegger (2013), with Susan Fisher Sterling, Krystyna Wasserman and Mark Pascale (ISBN 978-1-576-87639-8)

=== Anthologies ===
- Ghostly: A Collection of Ghost Stories (Scribner, 2015). An anthology selected and illustrated by Audrey Niffenegger; she also wrote the introduction. (ISBN 978-1-501-11119-8)

=== Books Foreworded by Niffenegger ===
- The Art of Neil Gaiman (with Hayley Campbell, Neil Gaiman, 2014, ISBN 978-0-062-24856-5)
- Classic Penguin: Cover to Cover (by Paul Buckley, 2016, ISBN 978-0-143-11013-2)
- Mr. Wrong: Real-Life Stories about the Men We Used to Love (Jacquelyn Mitchard, Harriet Brown, et al., 2007, ISBN 978-0-345-49021-6)

== Adaptations ==
- The Time Traveler's Wife (2009), film directed by Robert Schwentke, based on novel The Time Traveler's Wife
- The Time Traveler's Wife (2022), series created by Steven Moffat, based on novel The Time Traveler's Wife
- The Three Incestuous Sisters, an upcoming film directed by Alice Rohrwacher, based on the 2005 book The Three Incestuous Sisters
