= The Time Traveler's Wife =

2003 novel by Audrey Niffenegger

- First edition
- Author: Audrey Niffenegger
- Language: English
- Genre: Science fiction; Romance
- Published: 2003 (MacAdam/Cage)
- Publication place: United States
- Media type: Print (hardcover)
- Pages: 546 pp (first edition)
- ISBN: 978-0-15-602943-8
- OCLC: 54487508
- Dewey Decimal: 813/.54 22
- LC Class: PS3564.I362 T56 2003b

The Time Traveler's Wife is the debut novel by American author Audrey Niffenegger, published in 2003. It is a love story about Henry, a man with a genetic disorder that causes him to time travel unpredictably, and about Clare, his wife, an artist who has to cope with his frequent absences. Niffenegger, who was frustrated with love when she began the novel, wrote the story as a metaphor for her failed relationships. The tale's central relationship came to Niffenegger suddenly and subsequently supplied the novel's title. The novel has been classified as both science fiction and romance.

The book was published by MacAdam/Cage, a small publishing firm located in San Francisco, California. The book became a bestseller after an endorsement from author and family friend Scott Turow on NBC's Today. As of March 2009, the novel had sold nearly 2.5 million copies in the United States and the United Kingdom. Many reviewers were impressed with Niffenegger's unique perspective on time travel. Some praised her characterization of the couple, applauding their emotional depth; while others criticized her writing style as melodramatic and the plot as emotionally trite. The novel won the Exclusive Books Boeke Prize and a British Book Award.

Warner Bros. and New Line Cinema acquired the film and television rights to the book. A film adaptation was released in 2009 starring Rachel McAdams and Eric Bana, and a television series premiered on HBO and HBO Max on May 15, 2022.

== Plot summary ==
Using alternating first-person perspectives, the novel tells the stories of Henry DeTamble (born 1963), a librarian at the Newberry Library in Chicago, as he visits a child who will later become his wife, Clare Anne Abshire (born 1971), an artist who makes paper sculptures, with the aid of his uncontrolled ability to time travel. Henry has a rare genetic disorder, which later comes to be known as Chrono-Impairment. This disorder causes Henry to involuntarily travel through time. When 20-year-old Clare meets 28-year-old Henry at the Newberry Library in 1991 at the beginning of the novel, he has never seen her before, although she has known him most of her life.

Henry begins time traveling at the age of five, jumping forward and backward relative to his own timeline. When he vanishes, where he goes, and how long his trips will last are beyond his control. However, his destinations are tied to his subconscious—he most often travels to places and times related to his own history. Certain stimuli such as stress can trigger Henry's time traveling; he often goes jogging to keep calm and remain in the present. He searches out pharmaceuticals in the future that may be able to help control his time traveling. He also seeks the advice of a geneticist, Dr. Kendrick. Henry cannot take anything with him into the future or the past, which means that he always arrives naked and then struggles to find clothing, shelter, and food. He does amass a number of survival skills, including lock-picking, self-defense, and pickpocketing. Much of this he learns from older versions of himself (a form of bootstrap paradox).

Once Henry and Clare's timelines converge "naturally" at the library—their first meeting in his chronology—Henry starts to travel to Clare's childhood and adolescence in South Haven, Michigan, beginning in 1977 when she is only six years old. On one of his early visits (from Clare's perspective), Henry gives her a list of the dates he will appear and she writes them in a diary so she will remember to provide him with clothes and food when he arrives. During another visit, Henry inadvertently reveals that they will be married in the future. Over time they develop a close relationship. At one point, Henry helps Clare frighten and humiliate a boy who abused her. Clare is last visited in her youth by Henry in 1989, on her eighteenth birthday, during which they have sex for the first time. They are then separated for two years until their meeting at the library.

Clare and Henry eventually marry. Soon after their marriage, Clare begins to have trouble bringing a pregnancy to term because of the genetic anomaly Henry is presumably passing on to the fetus. After five miscarriages, Henry wishes to save Clare further pain and has a vasectomy. However, a version of Henry from the past visits Clare one night and they have sex; she subsequently gives birth to a daughter named Alba. Alba is diagnosed with Chrono-Impairment as well but, unlike Henry, she has some control over her destinations when she time travels. Before she is born, Henry travels to the future and meets his ten-year-old daughter on a school field trip. During this trip, he learns that he dies when Alba is five years old.

When he is 43, during what is to be his last year of life, Henry time travels to a Chicago parking garage on a frigid winter night where he is unable to find shelter. As a result of the hypothermia and frostbite he suffers while sleeping in the parking garage, his feet are amputated when he returns to the present time. Both Henry and Clare know that without the ability to escape when he time travels, Henry will certainly die within his next few jumps. On New Year's Eve 2006, Henry time travels into the middle of the Michigan woods in 1984 and is accidentally shot by Clare's brother, a scene foreshadowed earlier in the novel. Henry returns to the present and dies in Clare's arms.

Clare is devastated by Henry's death. She later finds a letter from Henry telling her to "stop waiting" for him, though it also describes a moment in her future when she will see him again. The couple reunites when Clare is 82 years old and Henry is 43. The novel's last scene shows a time when Clare, well into her old age, still waits for Henry, as she has done most of her life.

== Composition and publication ==
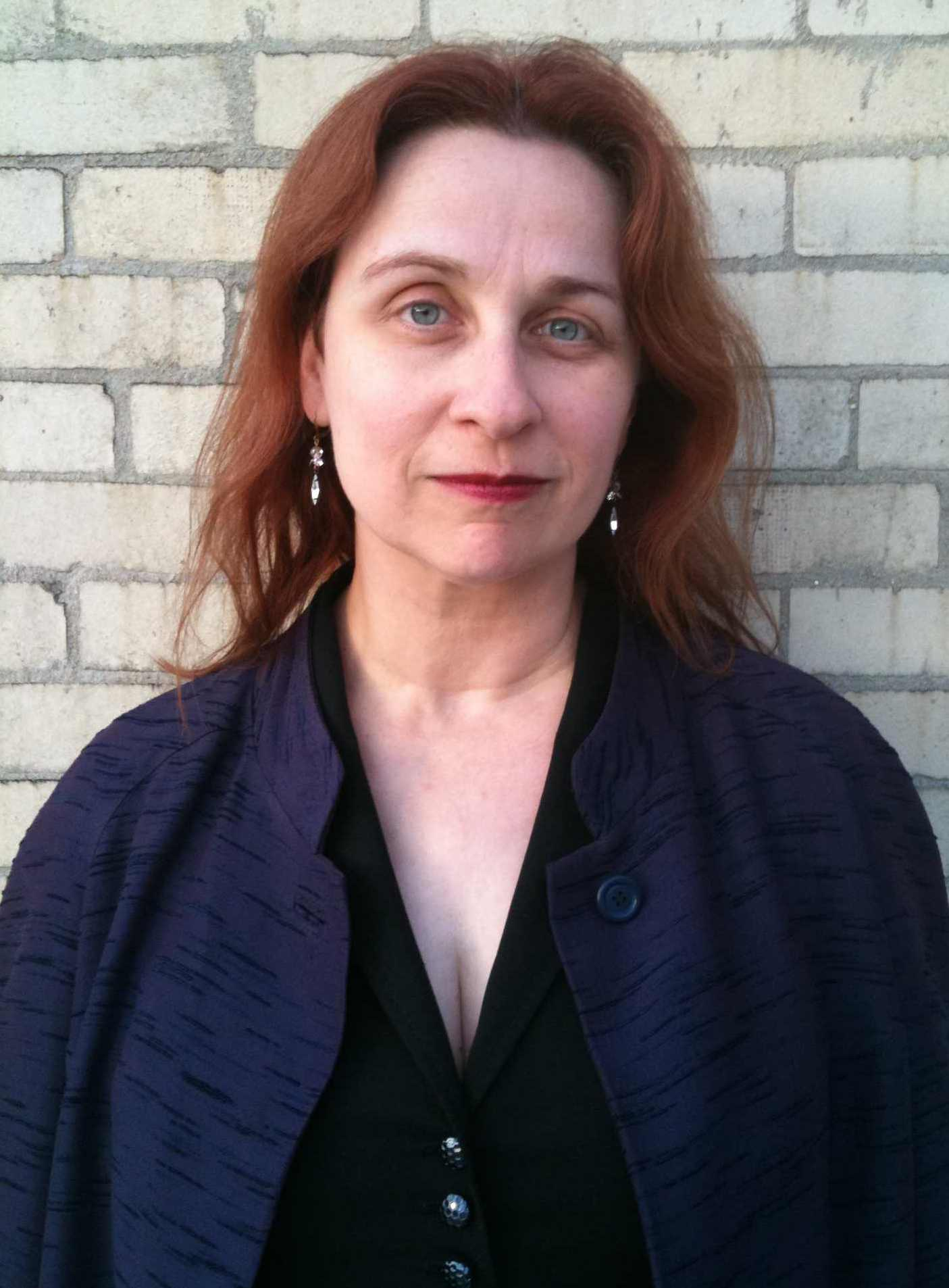
Audrey Niffenegger dyed her hair Clare-red to say "goodbye" to the novel after she had finished writing it.

Niffenegger is an artist who teaches at the Center for Book and Paper Arts at Columbia College Chicago, where she prepares editions of handpainted books. She produced some of her earlier works in editions of ten copies, which were sold in art galleries. However, she decided that The Time Traveler's Wife would have to be a novel: "I got the idea for the title, and when I draw I have this big drawing table covered with brown paper, and I write ideas down on the paper. So I wrote down this title and after a while I started to think about it. I couldn't think of a way to make it a picture book because still pictures don't represent time very well, so I decided to write a novel." She was intrigued by the title because "it immediately defined two people and their relationship to each other". Niffenegger said that its source was an epigraph to J. B. Priestley's 1964 novel Man and Time: "Clock time is our bank manager, tax collector, police inspector; this inner time is our wife." Drawing her central theme from this image, she says, "Henry is not only married to Clare; he's also married to time." Other authors whom Niffenegger has cited as influencing the book include Richard Powers, David Foster Wallace, Henry James, and Dorothy Sayers.

She has said the story is a metaphor for her own failed love affairs and that "I had kind of got the idea that there's not going to be some fabulous perfect soulmate out there for me, so I'll just make him up." She also drew on her parents' marriage for inspiration—her father spent the bulk of each week traveling. Despite the story's analogies to her own life, Niffenegger has forcefully stated that Clare is not a self-portrait; "She's radically different. I am much more willful and headstrong. ... I don't think I could go through a lifetime waiting for someone to appear, no matter how fascinating he was."

Niffenegger began writing the novel in 1997; the last scene, in which an aged Clare is waiting for Henry, was written first, because it is the story's focal point. The narrative was originally structured thematically. Responding to comments from readers of early drafts of the manuscript, Niffenegger reorganized the narrative so that it largely followed Clare's timeline. The work was finished in 2001. With no history of commercial publication, Niffenegger had trouble finding interested literary agents—25 rejected the manuscript. In 2002, she sent it unsolicited to the small, San Francisco-based publisher MacAdam/Cage, where it reached Anika Streitfeld. Streitfeld, who became Niffenegger's editor, "thought it was incredible. Right from the very beginning you feel like you are in capable hands, that this is someone who has a story to tell and who knows how to tell it." She gave it to David Poindexter, the founder of the publishing firm, "who read it overnight and decided to buy the book". However, Niffenegger had acquired an agent by this time, and several publishing houses in New York City were interested in the novel. The manuscript was put up for auction and MacAdam/Cage bid US$100,000, by far the largest sum it had ever offered for a book. Although another publisher outbid them, Niffenegger selected MacAdam/Cage because they were so dedicated to her work. Also, Niffenegger explains that her "own natural inclination is to go small. My background is in punk music—I'd always pick the indie company over the giant corporation."

== Genre ==
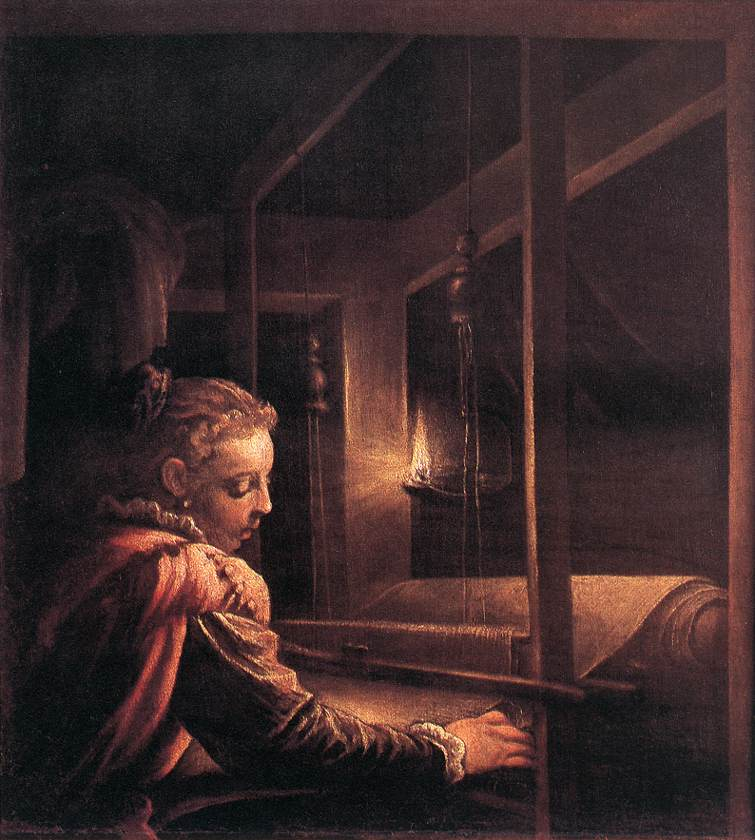
Clare compares herself to Penelope, waiting for Odysseus, a literary allusion highlighted by reviewers.

Reviewers have found The Time Traveler's Wife difficult to classify generically: some categorize it as science fiction, others as a romance. Niffenegger herself is reluctant to label the novel, saying she "never thought of it as science fiction, even though it has a science-fiction premise". In Niffenegger's view, the story is primarily about Henry and Clare's relationship and the struggles they endure. She has said that she based Clare and Henry's romance on the "cerebral coupling" of Dorothy Sayers's characters Lord Peter Wimsey and Harriet Vane.

Time travel stories to which the novel has been compared include Jack Finney's Time and Again (1970), F.M. Busby's short story "If This Is Winnetka, You Must Be Judy" and the film Somewhere in Time (1980). Henry has been compared to Billy Pilgrim of Kurt Vonnegut's Slaughterhouse-Five (1969). Science fiction writer Terence M. Green calls the novel a "timeslip romance". The Time Traveler's Wife is not as concerned with the paradoxes of time travel as is traditional science fiction. Instead, as critic Marc Mohan describes, the novel "uses time travel as a metaphor to explain how two people can feel as if they've known each other their entire lives". Robert Nathan's Portrait of Jennie, as novel, or film, is another obvious comparison, although Jennie, as a ghost, travels time in one direction, not randomly.

The Time Traveler's Wife influenced Steven Moffat when he was writing for the British science-fiction series Doctor Who. Moffat wrote the episode The Girl in the Fireplace as direct parallel to the Time Traveler's Wife; Niffeneger responded by having some of her characters watch that episode of Doctor Who in her second novel, Her Fearful Symmetry. Moffat later became showrunner for Doctor Who, and incorporated some of the ideas from the Time Traveler's Wife into the characters of Amy Pond, who first meets the time-travelling Doctor as a child and subsequently waits to meet him again when older, and River Song, who like the Doctor is a time-traveller. River and The Doctor meet at different points in their respective timelines, with changing knowledge of each others' history as a result. River documents these meetings in a diary, and the pair eventually marry.

== Themes ==
Niffenegger identifies the themes of the novel as "mutants, love, death, amputation, sex, and time". Reviewers have focused on love, loss, and time. As Charlie Lee-Potter writes in The Independent, the novel is "an elegy to love and loss". The love between Henry and Clare is expressed in a variety of ways, including through an analysis and history of the couple's sex life.

While much of the novel shows Henry and Clare falling in love, the end is darker and "time travel becomes a means for representing arbitrariness, transience, [and] plain bad luck", according to The Boston Globe's Judith Maas. As Andrew Billen argues in The Times, "The book may even serve as a feminist analysis of marriage as a partnership in which only the male is conceded the privilege of absence." Several reviewers noted that time travel represents relationships in which couples cannot quite communicate with each other. Natasha Walter of The Guardian describes the story's attention to "the sense of slippage that you get in any relationship—that you could be living through a slightly different love story from the one your partner is experiencing." She points, for example, to the section of the book which describes the first time Clare and Henry have sex. She is 18 and he is 41, already married to her in his present. After this interlude, he returns to his own time and his own Clare, who says,

Henry's been gone for almost twenty-four hours now, and as usual I'm torn between thinking obsessively about when and where he might be and being pissed at him for not being here ... I hear Henry whistling as he comes up the path through the garden, into the studio. He stomps the snow off his boots and shrugs off his coat. He's looking marvelous, really happy. My heart is racing and I take a wild guess: "May 24, 1989?" "Yes, oh, yes!" Henry scoops me up ... and swings me around. Now I'm laughing, we're both laughing.

The novel raises questions about determinism and free will. For example, critic Dan Falk asks, "Given that [Henry's] journey has 'already happened,' should he not simply be compelled to act precisely as he remembers seeing himself act? (Or perhaps he is compelled, and merely feels he has a choice...?)." Although Henry seemingly cannot alter the future, the characters do not become "cynical" and, according to Lee-Potter, the novel demonstrates that people can be changed through love. Walter notes that there is a "quasi-religious sense" to the inevitability of Henry's and Clare's lives and deaths. Niffenegger, however, believes that the novel does not depict destiny but rather "randomness and meaninglessness".

== Reception ==
The hardback edition of The Time Traveler's Wife was published in the United States in September 2003 by MacAdam/Cage and in the United Kingdom by Random House on 1 January 2004. MacAdam/Cage initiated an "extensive marketing drive", including advertising in The New York Times and The New Yorker and a promotional book tour by Niffenegger; the novel debuted at number nine on the New York Times bestseller list. After popular crime writer Scott Turow, whose wife is a friend of Niffenegger, endorsed it on The Today Show, the first print run of 15,000 sold out and 100,000 more copies were printed. In Britain, the book received a boost from its choice as a Richard & Judy book club recommendation—nearly 45,000 copies were sold in one week. It was named the 2003 Amazon.com Book of the Year. A December 2003 article in The Observer reported that although "a tiny minority of American reviewers" felt that the novel was "gimmicky", it was still "a publishing sensation". At that point, the novel had been sold to publishers in 15 countries. As of March 2009, it had sold almost 1.5 million copies in the United States and 1 million in the United Kingdom. The success of The Time Traveler's Wife prompted almost every major publishing firm to attempt to acquire Niffenegger's second novel, Her Fearful Symmetry, which has been called "one of the most eagerly sought-after works in recent publishing history". It garnered her an advance of US$5 million from Scribner's.

Reviewers praised Niffenegger's characterization of Henry and Clare, particularly their emotional depth. Michelle Griffin of The Age noted that although Henry "is custom-designed for the fantasy lives of bookish ladies", his flaws, particularly his "violent, argumentative, depressive" nature, make him a strong, well-rounded character. Charles DeLint wrote in The Magazine of Fantasy and Science Fiction that one of Niffenegger's "greatest accomplishments" in the novel was her ability to convey the emotional growth of Clare and Henry in character arcs while at the same time alternating their perspectives. Stephen Amidon of The Times, however, questioned the selfishness of the central characters.

Most reviewers were impressed with the premise of the novel, but critical of its melodramatic style. While Griffin praised the plot and concept as "clever", she argued that Niffenegger's writing is usually "pedestrian" and the story at times contrived. Heidi Darroch of the National Post agreed, contending that the story has an excess of overwrought emotional moments "which never quite add up to a fully developed plot". Writing in The Chicago Tribune, Carey Harrison praised the originality of the novel, specifically the intersection of child-bearing and time travel. Despite appreciating the novel's premise, Amidon complained that the implications of Henry's time-traveling were poorly thought out. For example, Henry has foreknowledge of the September 11 attacks but does nothing to try to prevent them. Instead, on 11 September 2001, he gets up early "to listen to the world being normal for a little while longer". Amidon also criticized the novel's "overall clumsiness", writing that Niffenegger is "a ham-fisted stylist, long-winded and given to sudden eruptions of cliche". Miriam Shaviv agreed to an extent, writing in The Jerusalem Post, "There are no original or even non-clichéd messages here. True love, Niffenegger seems to be telling us, is timeless, and can survive even the worst circumstances. ... And yet, the book is a page-turner, delicately crafted and psychologically sound." The Library Journal described the novel as "skillfully written with a blend of distinct characters and heartfelt emotions"; it recommended that public libraries purchase multiple copies of the book.

== Sequel ==
The first 25 pages of the sequel were available in 2013 with the purchase of The Time Traveler's Wife ebook. Although it was anticipated in 2018, and then in 2023, the sequel was not released until October 2026 under the title Life Out of Order. In it, most of the characters from the first novel return. Early reviews noted that the sequel has some strong writing but at almost 600 pages it is difficult to keep track of the many characters, relationships, and narrative threads that include Alba's marriage and a romance with another man, within the context of a dystopian world of global warming, political strife and the rise of fascism, and artificial intelligence.

== Awards and nominations ==
Award	Year	Result
Locus Award for Best First Novel	2004	Nominated
Orange Broadband Prize for Fiction	2004	Longlisted
Arthur C. Clarke Award	2005	Shortlisted
John W. Campbell Memorial Award	2005	Third place
Exclusive Books Boeke Prize	2005	Won
Geffen Award	2006	Nominated
British Book Award for Popular Fiction	2006	Won

== Adaptations ==
=== Audio book ===
BBC Audio published an audio book of The Time Traveler's Wife that was narrated by William Hope and Laurel Lefkow, described as "feisty readers" in one review.

HighBridge also produced an unabridged version in 2003, which is twelve hours long and narrated by Maggi-Meg Reed and Christopher Burns; their performance has been described as "sincere and passionate".

The 2006 Audible/HighBridge version is narrated by Fred Berman and Phoebe Strole and is 17:43 in length.

Audible.co.uk produced an unabridged version in 2008, also narrated by Hope and Lefkow.

=== Film ===
The film rights for The Time Traveler's Wife were optioned by Brad Pitt's production company Plan B Entertainment, in association with New Line Cinema, before the novel was even published. The adaptation was written by Bruce Joel Rubin and directed by Robert Schwentke, and stars Rachel McAdams as Clare and Eric Bana as Henry. Filming began in September 2007 and the movie was released by Warner Bros. on 14 August 2009. When asked about the prospect of her novel being turned into a film, Niffenegger said, "I've got my little movie that runs in my head. And I'm kind of afraid that will be changed or wiped out by what somebody else might do with it. And it is sort of thrilling and creepy, because now the characters have an existence apart from me." In general, the film received mixed-to-negative reviews. For example, The New York Times wrote that the film was an "often ridiculous, awkward, unsatisfying and dour melodramatic adaptation".

=== Television ===
In July 2018, HBO secured the rights to adapt the novel into a television series of the same name, to be written by Steven Moffat. In February 2021, Theo James and Rose Leslie were cast as Henry and Clare. The show was canceled after one season in July 2022. The fans of the show started a petition to save the series by approaching other streaming platforms to pick it up for renewal. It was removed from HBO Max in December 2022.

=== Stage musical ===
A stage musical based on the book was announced to be in development in March 2021, which is due to premiere in the UK in late 2021 or early 2022. The musical will be titled The Time Traveller's Wife (using the UK spelling of Traveler) and feature a book by Lauren Gunderson music and lyrics by Joss Stone and Dave Stewart with additional lyrics by Kait Kerrigan. The production was set to be directed by Bill Buckhurst and produced by Colin Ingram for InTheatre Productions by special arrangement with Warner Bros. Theatre Ventures.

In response to the announcement, Niffenegger revealed on Twitter she did not know about the project then clarified that the theatrical rights belonged to Warner Bros.

The stage musical premiered at Storyhouse in Chester from 30 September 2022. The production was directed by Bill Buckhurst and designed by Anna Fleischle, with choreography by Shelley Maxwell, lighting design by Lucy Carter, illusions by Chris Fisher, video design by Andrzej Goulding, sound design by Richard Brooker, musical supervision & arrangement by Nick Finlow and orchestrations by Bryan Crook.

The musical transferred to London's West End at the Apollo Theatre from October 2023.
