= The Time Traveler's Wife (TV series) =

2022 science fiction romantic drama TV series

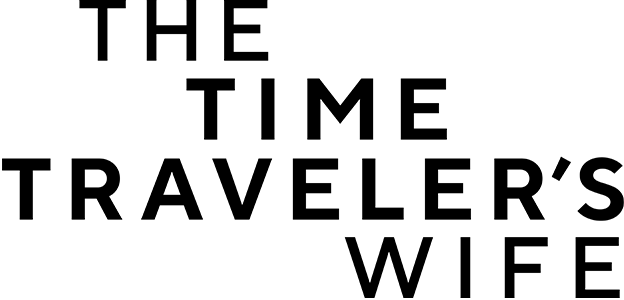
- Genre: Romance; Science fiction; Drama
- Based on: The Time Traveler's Wife by Audrey Niffenegger
- Developed by: Steven Moffat
- Written by: Steven Moffat
- Directed by: David Nutter
- Starring: Rose Leslie; Theo James
- Music by: Blake Neely
- Countries of origin: United States; United Kingdom
- Original language: English
- No. of seasons: 1
- No. of episodes: 6

Production
- Executive producers: Steven Moffat; Sue Vertue; Brian Minchin; David Nutter
- Producers: Sarah Rath; Patty Willett
- Cinematography: Peter Menzies Jr.
- Editors: Paul Karasick; Susan Vaill
- Running time: 45–56 minutes
- Production companies: Warner Bros. Television; Hartswood Films; New Line Cinema

Original release
- Network: HBO
- Release: May 15 – June 19, 2022

Title card for the HBO series The Time Traveler's Wife (2022).

The Time Traveler's Wife is a science fiction romantic drama television series based on the 2003 novel of the same name by Audrey Niffenegger. The series was developed and written by Steven Moffat, who had previously taken inspiration from Niffenegger's novel for his work on Doctor Who. It was directed by David Nutter, stars Rose Leslie and Theo James, and premiered on HBO on May 15, 2022. The series was canceled after one season in July 2022. The fans of the show started a petition to save the series by approaching other streaming platforms to pick it up for renewal. It was removed from HBO Max in December 2022.

Blending romance and science fiction, the series follows the relationship between Henry DeTamble, a man with a genetic disorder which causes him to sporadically travel through time for short periods, and Clare Abshire, a woman who met an older version of Henry when she was a girl and whom Henry would eventually marry in the future. Much like the novel on which it is based, the series raises questions about determinism, free will, and identity.

== Cast and characters ==
=== Main ===
- Rose Leslie as Clare Abshire
  - Everleigh McDonell as young Clare
  - Caitlin Shorey as pre-teen Clare
- Theo James as Henry DeTamble
  - Jason David as young Henry
  - Brian Altemus as teen Henry

=== Recurring ===
- Desmin Borges as Gomez
- Natasha Lopez as Charisse
- Michael Park as Philip Abshire
- Jaime Ray Newman as Lucille Abshire
- Taylor Richardson as Alicia Abshire
- Peter Graham as Mark Abshire
- Kate Siegel as Annette DeTamble
- Josh Stamberg as Richard DeTamble
- Chelsea Frei as Ingrid
- Marcia DeBonis as Nell
- Will Brill as Ben
- Spencer House as Jason
- Finn Brown as young Mark Abshire

== Episodes ==
All episodes are directed by David Nutter, and written by Steven Moffat.

No.	Title	Original release date	U.S. viewers (millions)
1	"Episode One"	May 15, 2022	0.294
2	"Episode Two"	May 22, 2022	0.224
3	"Episode Three"	May 29, 2022	0.159
4	"Episode Four"	June 5, 2022	0.245
5	"Episode Five"	June 12, 2022	0.213
6	"Episode Six"	June 19, 2022	0.203

== Production ==
On July 31, 2018, it was announced that HBO had given the production a straight-to-series order. The series was set to be written by Steven Moffat, based on the novel of the same name by Audrey Niffenegger, who was also set to executive produce alongside Sue Vertue and Brian Minchin. Production companies involved with the series included Hartswood Films and Warner Bros. Television.

In February 2021, Rose Leslie and Theo James were cast as the series leads. In April, Desmin Borges and Natasha Lopez joined the main cast. In May, Caitlin Shorey, Everleigh McDonnell, Michael Park, Jaime Ray Newman, Taylor Richardson, Peter Graham, Brian Altemus, Jason David, Kate Siegel, Josh Stamberg, Chelsea Frei, Marcia DeBonis, Will Brill and Spencer House joined the cast of the series.

Filming began on the series in May 2021 in New York and ended in October with some filming also taking place in Chicago. David Nutter directed all six episodes.

The series premiered on May 15, 2022 and was canceled on July 1, soon after the season finished airing.

== Critical reception ==
On the review aggregator website Rotten Tomatoes, 37% of 46 critics' reviews are positive, with an average rating of 5.1/10. The website's consensus reads: "While it's easy to get swept up in the romance of performers as appealing as Rose Leslie and Theo James, The Time Traveler's Wife often kills the mood with its overdetermined conceit." Metacritic, which uses a weighted average, assigned the film a score of 45 out of 100, based on 26 critics, indicating "mixed or average" reviews.

Anita Singh of The Daily Telegraph gave the series 2/5 stars, calling it "so lazy that episodes begin with the lead characters reading lines straight into the camera, rather than anyone making the effort to work them into the script." Brian Lowry of CNN called the series "an admirable effort, but one that simply underscores how unadaptable this material might be". Angie Han of The Hollywood Reporter criticized the setup of the romance, and added: "while things do improve from there, hollow characters, an uncertain tone and, most damningly, a total lack of chemistry keep The Time Traveler's Wife from ever quite rising to the level of swoon-worthy." Darren Franich of Entertainment Weekly gave it a D grade, saying that it had "Bad wigs, limp characterization, indifferent plotting".

Dan Einav of the Financial Times gave the series 3/5 stars, writing: "The show is buoyed by the charisma of the two lovers, and it succeeds in mining its conceit for some gentle humour and reflections on love and loss." Lucy Mangan of The Guardian also gave it 3/5 stars, saying that Moffat "takes the melodrama down a notch and salts the schmaltz with wit where he can", but criticized the nature of the romance and Clare's passivity. Nick Hilton of The Independent also gave it 3/5 stars, writing: "The Time Traveler's Wife does not have the power of the unexpected. But it has a modest, formulaic appeal that will likely keep you going back (and back) for more."

=== Home media ===
The complete series was released on DVD, on October 18, 2022.
