= Reversi (film) =

- Theatrical release poster
- Directed by: Adrian Teh
- Written by: Adrian Teh; Nazifdin Nasrudin
- Produced by: Adrian Teh
- Starring: Beto Kusyairy; Shiqin Kamal; Hasnul Rahmat; Vanida Imran; Azhan Rani; Zahiril Adzim; Qi Razali
- Cinematography: Danny Lala
- Edited by: Lee Pai Seang
- Music by: Jackey Yow
- Production companies: ACT 2 Pictures; Clover Flims; Golden Screen Cinemas; K-Movie Entertainment
- Distributed by: GSC Movies
- Release dates: 2 May 2024 (Udine); 19 December 2024 (Malaysia)
- Running time: 135 minutes
- Country: Malaysia
- Language: Malay
- Box office: RM 1.3 million

Reversi is a 2024 Malaysian romantic science fiction tragedy film directed and produced by Adrian Teh, who wrote the screenplay with Nazifdin Nasrudin. Starring Beto Kusyairy, Shiqin Kamal, Hasnul Rahmat, Vanida Imran, Azhan Rani, Zahiril Adzim and Qi Razali, the film tells the story of a husband's undying love for his wife and son, who tries his best to right his past wrongs for a better future.

The film made its world premiere at the Udine Far East Film Festival in Italy on 2 May 2024, and was released in Malaysian cinemas on 19 December 2024.

== Plot ==
At eighteen years old, Akid learns that he has the ability to rewind time, a power that has been in his family for generations. His father, Aziz, warns Akid that although he can use his ability for small things, he has to accept that there are some fates that cannot be changed. One night Akid witnesses Aziz getting stabbed to death after rescuing a woman from being robbed. Akid is unable to rewind time when he's stressed, and he grows up haunted by his inability to save his father.

Akid becomes a police officer and hones his skill in rewinding time, which he uses to help with cases. He falls in love with Sarah, whom he tells about his skill, and she makes him promise to stop using his ability. The pair are married and have a son, Anas. One night Sarah and Anas are killed when they're hit by a car driven by Hisham, a man that Akid helped earlier that day. Akid immediately rewinds time but when he's unable to stop the accident itself, he travels days backward repeatedly to try different ways to stop Sarah and Anas from leaving the house, or to stop Hisham from being on the road. Each time, Sarah and Anas still die by various tragic accidents.

Although rewinding time causes him to age faster, Akid keeps going until his attempts number in the hundreds. Akid is eventually able to intervene in the accident itself, but is only able to save one person. He saves Sarah, who cannot forgive him for choosing her over their child. Sarah orders Akid to try again, and in Akid's next attempt he saves Anas instead. Anas becomes resentful of Akid, who is overprotective of him, and their relationship deteriorates.

One day while Anas is out with his grandmother, Hazirah, he collapses. Akid is about to rewind time, but Hazirah stops him and advises him to accept fate. Hazirah tells Akid the whole story of how Aziz died. Originally Akid was the one who died that day, and Aziz rewound time repeatedly to try to save him, but was unable to change his fate until he died in Akid's place. Aziz said goodbye to Hazirah on the morning before his death. Anas dies in the hospital.

Hisham, who is in prison, requests a visit from Akid to ask for forgiveness. Akid forgives him and accepts his fate. Akid rewinds time to when Anas was alive, apologizes for his behavior, and spends some quality time with him. Akid rewinds time again to when Sarah was alive, and spends time with her and the younger Anas. Akid rewinds time further back, to relive earlier moments of his relationship with Sarah. Eventually Akid returns to the night Aziz died, but traveling has made him age greatly. Before dying, Akid tells Aziz that he knows his fate is to die today, and he thanks his father for giving him the chance to live a good life, in which he had a loving wife and child. Akid dies.

Aziz rewinds time to earlier that day, and he and Hazirah accept Akid's fate to die as he was originally meant to.

== Cast ==
- Beto Kusyairy as Akid, a police officer who can reverse time
- Shiqin Kamal as Sarah, Akid's wife
- Hasnul Rahmat as Aziz, Akid's father
- Vanida Imran as Hazirah, Akid's mother
- Azhan Rani as Hisham, driver of the car that kills Sarah and Anas
- Zahiril Adzim as Luqman, Akid's colleague
- Qi Razali as Dr. Kabir, a psychologist who evaluates Akid
- Dzul Hadziq as Anas (7 years old), Akid and Sarah's son
- Danish Zamri as Anas (10 years old)
- Putra Ayden as Anas (baby)
- Amyza Aznan as Aisyah
- Zarra Zhaff as Min
- Kaverrna Nair as Misha

The film's director, Adrian Teh, make a cameo appearance as the aikido instructor.

== Production ==
Reversi was directed by Adrian Teh, a Penang-born director best known for his directorial works like Lelio Popo (2010), King of Mahjong (2015), PASKAL: The Movie (2018) and MALBATT: Misi Bakara (2023). Teh began writing the film's screenplay in 2015 and according to him, it was written very much longer than PASKAL. After MALBATT was released, Teh decided to take a break from making action films and explored other genres. For the film, he chose to write about the time travel – a concept, he said, that was rarely highlighted in Malay films and use it as a narrative tool to exploring the close relationship between a father and his son. He took the inspiration from his favourite time travel-themed films like The Time Traveler's Wife and About Time.

The film's screenplay was fully completed in 2023. Teh also revamp the script as he wanted a completely different storyline, unlike any other time travel films. He then approach director, Nik Amir Mustapha as he was impressed with the latter's work in 2022 science fiction film, Imaginur, which also starring Beto Kusyairy. Nik Amir, however, withdrew due to his schedulling conflicts. Teh then approached several directors, including Ariff Zulkarnain, but also withdrew from the film due to creative differences. In the end, he had to do it by himself, thinking that he "shouldn't fight fate".

Beto was chosen to play Akid. After a long discussion with Teh, he agreed to took the role after reading the script and acknowledged that Reversi was intended to tackling contemporary issues. For the character, Teh puts two conditions in Akid's story: "First, he can only return to the past after 18 years and the second, he had to endure the impact of his own act". Teh also utilise a special effects to create the older version of Akid to achieved the better ageing process.

== Release ==
Reversi became the only Malaysian film to be shortlisted at the competition section of the Udine Far East Film Festival (FEFF) in Italy and have its international premiere on 2 May 2024. The film was released in Malaysian cinemas on 19 December 2024, seven months after its international premiere.
