= Magik Rompak =

- Theatrical release poster
- Directed by: Adrian Teh
- Written by: Adrian Teh; Zuli Ismail
- Produced by: Adrian Teh
- Starring: Zul Ariffin; Sharnaaz Ahmad; Amelia Henderson; Nadhir Nasar
- Cinematography: Danny Voon
- Edited by: Lee Pai Seang
- Music by: Jackey Yow
- Production companies: ACT 2 Pictures; Golden Screen Cinemas; Astro Shaw; Clover Flims; Overseas Union Garden
- Distributed by: GSC Movies (Malaysia); Clover Films (Singapore)
- Release date: 11 September 2025 (Malaysia)
- Running time: 134 minutes
- Country: Malaysia
- Language: Malay
- Budget: RM 13 million
- Box office: RM 5 million

Magik Rompak is a 2025 Malaysian action heist film directed by Adrian Teh from a screenplay co-written by Teh and Zuli Ismail. The film stars Zul Ariffin, Sharnaaz Ahmad, Amelia Henderson and Nadhir Nasar in leading roles and was released on 11 September 2025.

== Premise ==
Hadi, also known as "The Great Hadini", a once-famous magician joins a group of thieves who want revenge on a powerful individual, Tan Sri Hamdan. Their target is the "Hati Kesuma" or the "Heart of Kesuma", a legendary ruby-studded gold necklace worth millions of ringgit, which is to be displayed at Tan Sri's lavish retirement party. However, during the heist, their mission is threatened by treachery and greed.

== Cast ==
- Zul Ariffin as Fariq
- Sharnaaz Ahmad as Hadi / "The Great Hadini"
- Amelia Henderson as Wawa
- Nadhir Nasar as Ujang
- Tay Ping Hui as Tan Sri Hamdan Tan
- Yasmin Hani as Puan Sri Rubiah Tan
- Fabian Loo as Tommy Tan
- Miller Khan as Sean Rahman
- Elvina Mohamad as Maya / Delina
- Theebaan G as Najib
- Anas Ridzuan as Malik
- Wan Raja as the Appraiser
- Mustaqim Bahadon as Khalid
- Aanantha Rajaram as Dr. Siva
- Shamini Shradha as Kumala
- Eric Chen as the HK Partner
- Alicia Amin as the ceremony host

== Production ==
Magik Rompak was directed by Adrian Teh, a Penang-born director who had a reputation for directing action films such as Paskal (2018) and MALBATT: Misi Bakara (2023), and co-produced by ACT 2 Pictures, Golden Screen Cinemas, Astro Shaw, Clover Flims and Overseas Union Garden. The soundtrack for the film, "Bayangan" was performed by Sharul Kamal and Aepul Roza. Cinematography was handled by Danny Voon, while the editing process was handled by Lee Pai Seang.

Sharnaaz Ahmad, one of the film's main cast, underwent six weeks of training to practice magic tricks under the guidance of professional trainers. During the filming, his father died and the filming delayed for several days to enable Sharnaaz spent his time with his father for the last time. Principal photography began in November and December 2024 for 50 days in Kuala Lumpur and Klang Valley and took the inspiration from 2013 film Now You See Me, stars Jesse Eisenberg, Mark Ruffalo and Woody Harrelson.

== Release and reception ==
The film was released in Malaysia and Singapore on 11 September 2025. It has earned RM 100,000 gross during its early screening.

Hakem Hassan from Astro Gempak called the film as "an entertaining". Dinesh Kumar Maganathan from Free Malaysia Today noted that Teh "may not have pulled a rabbit out of the hat, but he's definitely pulled off a daring new trick for Malaysian cinema". Tay Yek Keak from 8days gave this film 3 stars out of 5, commenting that it was too long and dragged out.
