= MALBATT: Misi Bakara =

- Official theatrical poster for Malaysia release
- Directed by: Adrian Teh
- Written by: Adrian Teh; Ashraf Modee Zain
- Produced by: Adrian Teh; Syed Ali Shahul Hameed; Budi Citawan; Esther Hau; Catalina Mae Hubband; Lim Teck
- Starring: Bront Palarae; Shaheizy Sam; Hairul Azreen; Zahiril Adzim; Iedil Dzuhrie Alaudin; Adlin Aman Ramlie; Tony Eusoff; Fauzi Nawawi; Syazwan Zulkifly; Dafi Ismail Sabri; Taufiq Hanafi; Nafiez Zaidi; Gambit Saifullah; Dini Schatzmann; Theeban G; Safwan Nazri; Ikhram Juhari
- Cinematography: Yong Choon Lin
- Edited by: Lee Pai Seang
- Music by: Jackey Yow
- Production companies: Berjaya Pictures; ACT 2 Pictures; Fast Bikes; Golden Screen Cinemas; Astro Shaw
- Distributed by: GSC Movies
- Release dates: 24 August 2023 (Malaysia & Singapore)
- Running time: 131 minutes
- Country: Malaysia
- Languages: Malay; English; Somali
- Budget: MYR 20 million ($4.4 million)
- Box office: MYR 32.5 million ($7.3 million)

MALBATT: Misi Bakara (English: MALBATT: Bakara Mission) is a 2023 Malaysian war film directed, produced and co-written by Adrian Teh. This film stars Bront Palarae, Shaheizy Sam, Hairul Azreen, Zahiril Adzim, Iedil Dzuhrie Alaudin, Adlin Aman Ramlie, Fauzi Nawawi, Tony Eusoff, Syazwan Zulkifly, Dafi Ismail Sabri, Taufiq Hanafi, Nafiez Zaidi, Dini Schatzmann, Gambit Saifullah, Theebaan G, Safwan Nazri and Ikhram Juhari. It is based on the true story of a Malaysian military operation to help rescue US Rangers trapped in a civil war in Somalia in 1993. The film was released on 24 August 2023 in Malaysia and Singapore.

Official theatrical poster for Singapore release

== Plot ==
This film is based on a true story in 1993 and explores the bravery of the 19th Mechanized Royal Malay Soldier Regiment (RAMD) from the Malaysia Battalion (MALBATT) who rescued American Rangers trapped in Bakara Market, Mogadishu, the capital of Somalia, in the Black Hawk Down incident.

== Cast ==
=== Main cast (19th RAMD Mechanized MALBATT) ===
- Bront Palarae as Major Adnan (inspired by the late Major (B) Abd Aziz)
- Shaheizy Sam as Lance Corporal Ramlee (inspired by Corporal Sabri Adun, Corporal Mohd Sabri Ahmad)
- Hairul Azreen as Lieutenant Ismail, the youngest military officer (inspired by Second Lieutenant Juraimy Arifin)
- Zahiril Adzim as Lieutenant Dahari (inspired by Lieutenant Zunaidi Hassan, Lieutenant Khairul Anuar)
- Iedil Dzuhrie Alaudin as Lieutenant Mustafa, the platoon leader from Bravo Company (inspired by Lieutenant Mazlan Fauzi, Lt Kamal Idris)
- Adlin Aman Ramlie as Colonel Rahman (inspired by the character of Lt. Col. Rozi Md Baharom & Brig. General Abdul Latif Ahmad), Commander of MALBATT
- Fauzi Nawawi as Major Osman, MALBATT Operations Officer (inspired by Lt. Col. Mohd Arif Shafiee's character)
- Tony Eusoff as Major Abd Samad, Bravo Company Combat Team Leader (inspired by Major Latif Bin Ladin, Captain Zawawi Adam)
- Syazwan Zulkifly as Lieutenant Johan (inspired by Lieutenant Mat Azman Piah)
- Dafi Ismail Sabri as Lance Corporal Zulkifli (inspired by Private Rizal Ismail), APC condor driver
- Taufiq Hanafi as Lance Corporal Fuad (inspired by Lance Corporal Sulaiman Aziz)
- Nafiez Zaidi as Lance Corporal Nik Zainal @ Pok Nik, the rear shooter (inspired by Lance Corporal Ruzaini Man)
- Dini Schatzmann as Sergeant Hamid
- Gambit Saifullah as Sergeant Mukhriz (inspired by Staff Sergeant (B) Fakaruddin @ Gunung), a marksman army
- Theebaan G as Lance Corporal Shah, medic
- Safwan Nazri as Private Isa (inspired by the late Corporal Aznan Mat Awang SP), condor driver
- Ikhram Juhari as Lance Corporal Wahid (inspired by Lance Corporal Abdul Aziz Barakatollah)
- Ken Abdullah as Captain Mansor, MALBATT's Intelligence Officer
- Mejar Mustaqim as Sniper Spotter
- Arwan as Corporal Aslam
- Zakaria Zahid as Corporal Ahmad
- Abbas Mahmood as Sergeant Abd Rahman
- Adrian Teh as Imran, one of the platoon and medic assistant to Lance Corporal Shah

==== United States of America ====
- Joshua Flickema as Lieutenant Cage, a US Ranger officer
- Paul Biddiss (serving as a Military Advisor) as a US Ranger officer
- Jens Grund as 10th Mountain Division Soldier #3
- Dogan Baris Yasar as 10th Mountain Division Soldier #4
- Chase Lanting as 10th Mountain Division Soldier #5
- Jon Pierre Narbey as Lieutenant Jansen, a US Ranger officer
- Craig Haydon as Colonel Lawrence, a US Ranger officer
- Uldis Zalcmanis as Lieutenant Colonel Colt, a US Ranger officer
- Julia Melek as Sofia, a CNN reporter

==== Pakistan and Somalia ====
- Musa Aden as Abdalle, a Somali serving as MALBATT's interpreter and friend of Lance Corporal Ramlee
- Emmanuel Mele Jason as chief militia of the United Somali Congress
- Benjamin Osayende Aghedo as Abdalle's son, the only son
- Tosin Marie as Abdalle's wife
- Rezki Khirat as Lieutenant Colonel Khan, a Pakistani Army officer
- Qamar Athwaal as Lieutenant Colonel Muhammad, a Pakistani Army officer

==== Families of MALBATT members ====
- Shiqin Kamal as Lieutenant Dahari's wife
- Yuna Rahim as Private Isa's wife (inspired by Puan Siti Zauyah Yahya, widow of the late Corporal Mat Aznan Awang)
- Aiman Badrul as Lieutenant Johan's eldest son.
- Aqiel Razra Nifael as Lieutenant Johan's youngest son.

== Production ==
=== Development ===
The film cost RM20 million making it one of the most expensive films in Malaysia and an action film with the most expensive budget in line with the Malaysian animated film, Upin & Ipin: The Lone Gibbon Kris and the film Puteri Gunung Ledang. Adrian felt pressured by the speech from Tan Sri Vincent Tan during the launch of this film.

Adrian said that he had started this project since the completion of the filming of PASKAL: The Movie when he met with the late Major (B) Abd Aziz to tell about that night where their team still went into the field despite facing many challenges to save the American soldiers.

According to Adrian, this film was inspired by the American film, Black Hawk Down directed by Ridley Scott with produced by Jerry Bruckheimer, where he studied himself and realised that the film did not show the real story line when it did not show the scenes of Malaysian soldiers going into the field. According to Adrian, that film did show American as the heroes while the actual heroes are Malaysian Army. He also see the chance for this film to get the box office and profit throughout selling the film to Indonesia, West Asia, China and Muslim country like Mat Kilau: Kebangkitan Pahlawan.

This film will see 15 producers (2 line producers, 5 producers and 8 executive producers; Adrian is credited twice) and six companies (including Fast Bikes and Aurum Invested Limited) indirectly credited in this film making it one of the most in Malaysian films.

This film will see the first Malaysian film to be screened in IMAX format and according to Adrian, the Digital Cinema Package (DCP) will be upgraded to IMAX 6-Track format in accordance with the location of IMAX in Malaysia.

=== Filming ===
Before filming began, the actors were asked to train like soldiers at Segenting Camp, Port Dickson. Hairul said they were introduced to the Condor armoured car that was used in the incident in Bakara. In addition, Hairul was also introduced to various weapons and all basic war tactics. According to Iedil, they coincidentally met Colonel Juraimy, the Director of Cadet Training (at the time of the incident he held the rank of Second Lieutenant), one of the heroes behind the war mission.

While Paul Biddiss, a former member of the British army, was assigned to train the actors for the action scenes, according to him in an interview, he did not think long about Adrian's offer and used it as best he could for the sake of this film. Biddiss is a military advisor who once guided international actors, especially Hollywood, to the birth of blockbuster films such as 1917, Mission: Impossible – Rogue Nation and others. In addition, several Malaysian Army officers were also brought along to monitor every aspect.

The film was shot in Gaziantep, Turkey; locations in Somalia including Bakara, while the rest were made at Pinewood Iskandar Studio Malaysia located in Iskandar Puteri, Johor Bahru for scenes inside the MALBATT 1 headquarters and Mogadishu. as well as RMAF Base Subang for the MALBATT contingent departure scene and Gemas Target Field, Negeri Sembilan for the shooting scene in the Condor APC.

During the press conference of this film at GSC Mid Valley Megamall on 30 May 2023, Adrian revealed to the media that this film was almost cancelled as it was shot on the Turkey-Syria border because the Syrian people did not know and took pictures and spread it on social media.

In order to continue filming, Adrian himself met with the local mayor to explain the matter. The mayor allowed Adrian's team to continue shooting the film on the condition that international media were allowed to visit the shooting location in Gaziantep.

According to the director, the explosion that will be presented is a real explosion with a touch of computer-generated imagery (CGI). Most of the actors experienced the actual explosion at close range to make it look more realistic. Adrian also said that as many as 900 CG shots were used in the film through the segment 'Mulut Puaka' made by Zhafvlog from YouTube channel Pure Pixels.

=== Casting ===
This film will see the seventh film of the combination of Adrian and Hairul Azreen after the films PASKAL: The Movie, WIRA, All Because Of You!, Ada Hantu, The Assistant and Ada Hantu 2. It will also see many actors joining to act together from different films in this one film such as Shaheizy Sam and Fauzi Nawawi (Polis Evo 3), Bront Palarae and Taufiq Hanafi (Ola Bola), Zahiril Adzim, Nafiez Zaidi, Dafi Ismail Sabri and Hairul (Ada Hantu and Ada Hantu 2), Iedil Dzulhrie Alaudin, Tony Eusoff and Hairul (The Assistant), Hairul, Gambit Saifullah, Theeban G and Taufiq (PASKAL: The Movie), Ikhram Juhari, Hairul and Shaheizy (Polis Evo 2), Bront and Zahiril (One Two Jaga and Bunohan), Gambit and Adlin Aman Ramlie (Coast Guard Malaysia: Ops Helang) and more. Remy Ishak was originally listed to star in the film, but withdrew due to his busy work schedule. Alif Satar is also said to have been involved in the initial production of this film but he was not on the final list.

According to Dafi, who first acted in a famous action film because he is the son of the 9th Prime Minister of Malaysia, Ismail Sabri Yaakob, when he was given a role in this story, he had to think 2 to 3 times because he did not want to spoil someone's film . He thanked Adrian and Hairul for supporting him.

According to Safwan Nazri, who is acting in a film for the first time, he has to do casting compared to others. He apparently couldn't do it the first time because he only needed to record on the phone. However, there was a message received by Safwan on his WhatsApp saying that he was able to 'holiday' to Turkey. He was excited because his wife was four months pregnant at the time. The happiness did not last long when his wife miscarried and he told the media that he wanted to return to Malaysia. He only thought about his son during the filming. After returning home, he was given good news when his wife became pregnant again.

According to Adrian, he did not use real names based on the soldiers involved in this mission because he wanted to respect their names and was worried if they would be compared to actors.

This film will be Hairul's last film after he announced on 21 August 2023, 3 days before the film's official release when he was invited in the 3 Pagi ERA segment by ERA radio, one of the film's official radio partners.

For Musa Aden, he is very proud to be a part of this film. The Star interviewed Musa;

"Yes we left, but we saw people getting killed all the time there. As a young kid, hearing gunshots became normal. When your house is hit by bullets, it's normal. "At the beginning, it's scary, but after a while, you are grateful when you get to see another day."

=== Writing ===
The screenplay for this film is Adrian himself and Ashraf Modee Zain, a representative from Astro Shaw Writers' Room replacing Anwari Ashraf who previously collaborated with Adrian in the film PASKAL: The Movie and WIRA which is also a film under Astro Shaw's production. The script of this film took three years to complete because the script had to be researched until it took a revamp in this film. According to Adrian, he has no problem in the production of this film script with the help of the Malaysian Armed Forces. This film shows 90 per cent of the true story of the war.

== Release ==
=== Marketing ===
The film's marketing poster does not show the actors' faces because Adrian does not want to sell the artist's name. Adrian say to Astro Gempak that he want to focus on the main subject of the product.

In conjunction with the launch of this film, several official partners have been involved in this film. Kenny Rogers Roasters Malaysia has launched Nasi Wira Sets. 7-Eleven Malaysia also became one of the official partners for this film by selling the film's merchandise such as wallets, key chains, pins, bags and umbrellas. Other official partners include Starbucks Malaysia which is selling this film edition Frappuccino for a limited time, Cosway Malaysia and Krispy Kreme Doughtnuts Malaysia. All of these official partners under the Berjaya Corporation Berhad subsidiary led by Tan Sri Vincent Tan who is also the executive producer of this film.

3 distributors have so far been responsible for distributing this film; GSC Movies for Malaysia, Clover Films, partner ACT 2 Pictures and Golden Village Pictures for Singapore saw this film screened in the country on the same day, 24 August 2023.

Golden Screen Cinemas has promoted the early screening of this film in IMAX format at GSC IOI City Mall 2 and GSC The Mall, Mid Valley Southkey, Johor Bahru as early as 18 August 2023. GSC adds screenings in 4DX, GSC BIG and Dolby Atmos formats as well. However, it only started showing on 23 August 2023 starting at 6pm in conjunction with the early screening, a day before the official screening. They also sell this movie-themed canteen bottle for RM25 and is offered in 2 packages. GSC's corn boxes have been changed to the theme of writing #Malaysiaku in conjunction with the Malaysia Independent Month celebration and on the back of the box are the faces of the actors of this film.

TGV Cinemas is also offering early screenings in IMAX format as early as 18 August 2023 as well.

GSC also adding this film in Play+ Hall for kids and Onyx formats with the reducing of showtimes in main format (IMAX).

== Reception ==
=== Box Office ===
Cinema Collection Table MALBATT: Misi Bakara (24 August – now)
| Show duration | Cumulative collection |
|---|---|
| Early screening (24 August) | RM1 million |
| 2 days (until 26 August) | RM4.5 million |
| 4 days (until 28 August) | RM10.5 million |
| 6 days (until 30 August) | RM13.5 million |
| 8 days (until 1 September) | RM19 million |
| 11 days (until 4 September) | RM26.4 million |
| 18 days (until 11 September) | RM31 million |
| 26 days (until 19 September) | RM32.5 million |

MALBATT: Misi Bakara collected RM1 million on the initial screening. The film's collection soared up to RM4.5 million after 2 days of official release. After 4 days, the film managed to collect RM10.5 million just behind Mat Kilau: Kebangkitan Pahlawan and Polis Evo 3's record for 4-day post-COVID-19 pandemic collection. The collection continued to increase to RM13.5 million for 6 days and has a better record than the film co-produced by Astro Shaw, Mechamato Movie and Hantu Kak Limah. After 11 days, this film managed to equal the local collection of the film PASKAL: The Movie directed by Adrian himself and managed to beat another of Malaysia's most expensive films, Upin & Ipin: Keris Siamang Tunggal and the action comedy film Abang Long Fadil 3.

=== Critical response ===
The film was generally given positive reviews by the critics in terms of the acting of all the actors in this film and the public, especially the heirs of the real heroes behind the Battle of Mogadishu and the Malaysian Army, even they also made their own reactions.

Pure Pixels' Zhafvlog praised the film's easy-to-understand and informative narration. He gave a rating of 5/5 stars.

Casey from CaseyMovieMania said:

I was initially expecting MALBATT: Misi Bakara would be more of a straightforward war film focusing solely on the Malaysian soldiers assisting the US troops on a rescue mission. But (Adrian) Teh also put on extra effort by incorporating the necessary conflicts and viewpoints between the Malaysian and US troops, giving the movie added dramatic weight.

Casey also said:

Still, it was Musa Aden, the Somali-American actor who played the UN interpreter, Abdalle, who surprisingly stole the show from the otherwise all-star cast. Having experienced the Somali Civil War in real life himself, his appearance adds a palpable sense of authenticity to the movie. It's hard not to root for his sympathetic character, who just wants to do the right thing between helping the Malaysian soldiers and saving his people from committing war crimes. Aden also deserved praise for his brief but winning chemistry with Shaheizy Sam, where the latter delivers a typically engaging performance as Lance Corporal Ramlee.

Dennis Chua, writing for New Straits Times, told:

His (Lance Corporal Ramlee - Shaheizy Sam) friendship with the Somali interpreter Abdalle (Musa Aden) is a poignant subplot and a testament to Malaysians' ability to befriend people across borders.

He also say;

Viewers are introduced to our heroes in a military parade back home, before the camera zooms in on the eyes of one of them, and out again when the lieutenant is in a shootout in a bullet-riddled Mogadishu building.

Movie portal KakiMuvee like the 2nd part of the film that is when they receive the mission (from UNOSOM) and start entering the battle location (on Bakara Market, Mogadishu).

== Music ==
"Limitasi"

Single by Tomok ft. Ariz
- Language: Malay
- Released: August 8, 2023
- Length: 3:31
- Label: Rocektfuel Entertainment
- Composers: Ariz, Nana Sheme & Zikri Zakaria
- Lyricist: Ariz
- Producers: Ariz (for ACT 2 Pictures), Zikri Zakaria (co-producer), BC (executive)

Original soundtrack for this film called Limitasi sang by Tomok featuring Ariz. The writer of the song was Ariz who known for writing Berserah song performed by Zizan Razak and Ismail Izzani. Background singer for the song are Nana Sheme, Baby Akmal, Yubi and Jad Lobo. The song released on 8 August 2023, the same day as the gala premiere while the lyric video can be watch on Rocketfuel Network's YouTube on 15 August 2023.

Digital streaming
| No. | Title | Writer(s) | Singer | Length |
|---|---|---|---|---|
| 1. | "Limitasi" | Ariz | Tomok ft. Ariz | 3:31 |
