= Bakara (disambiguation) =

Bakara is a village in Iraq.

Bakara may refer to the following.

- Bakara, Nigeria, a populated place
- Bakara, South Australia, a locality
- Bakara Conservation Park, a protected area in South Australia
- Bakaara Market, a market in Somalia
- Hundred of Bakara, a cadastral unit in South Australia
