= Jasmine Suraya Chin =

Malaysian television presenter and actress

- Born: Jasmine Suraya Chin Xian Mei; 10 November 1989 (age 37); Kuching, Sarawak, Malaysia
- Education: Monash University, Melbourne
- Occupations: Television presenter, actress, model
- Years active: 2012–present

Jasmine Suraya Chin Xian Mei (born 10 November 1989) is a Malaysian television presenter and actress from Kuching, Sarawak. She is best known for portraying Lily in the 2018 Malaysian action film PASKAL, co-starring with Hairul Azreen.

== Filmography ==
Key
†	Denotes upcoming films

=== Film ===
Year	Title	Role	Notes
2014	River of Exploding Durians	Jasmine	
2015	Tuli Sekampung		
2015	Return to Nostalgia	Zaharah	
2015	Rembat	Geisha	
2017	Dave		Short film
2017	KL Wangan	Hong's wife	
2018	Paskal	Lily	
2018	The Spiral	Tina	
2020	Daulat	Jasmin Cho	
2020	Pasal Kau!	Herself	
2021	Marabahaya Underground	Dotty	
TBA	Masterpiecisan †	Ruby	Post-production

=== Drama ===
Year	Title	Role	TV channel
2014	Kerana Terpaksa Aku Relakan	Tini	TV3
2014	Maaf Jika Aku Tak Sempurna	Effa	TV3
2014	A&E	Dr. Sharon	
2015	Padamu Aku Bersujud	Sandra	TV3
2015–2016	Keluarga Pontimau	Chichi	TV3
2017	Hero Seorang Cinderella	Zuyyin	Astro Ria
2018	Pengantin 100 Hari	Farah	TV3
2018	KL Gangster: Underworld	Mimi	Iflix
2018	Alamatnya Cinta	Natalia	Astro Ria
2019–2020	Adellea Sofea	Suzie Tan	TV3
2020	KL Gangster: Underworld 2	Mimi	Iflix
2020	Pelindung Seorang Puteri	Bainun	Astro Ria
2020	Bidadari Saiju	Jeanny	TV3
2021	Klik Rider	Tasya	Astro Warna
2021	Cinta Yang Pulang	Thia	TV2
2022	Villa Kristal	Angel	WeTV
2022	Ratu Ten Pin 2	Shalin	Astro Ria
2024	Racun Rihanna	Ayumi	TV3

=== Telemovie ===
Year	Title	Role	TV channel
2014	Tesis Terakhir		TV1
2014	Cinta Di Gerai		Astro Maya HD
2017	Komplot		Astro Citra
2018	Cinta Elevator		Astro Citra
2019	Back To You (“当时明月在” [Dang Shi Ming Yue Zai]）		8TV/TV3
2020	Please Subscribe Cintaku	Hana Rozana	Astro Citra

=== Television ===
Year	Title	Role	TV channel	Notes
2012	The Job	Herself	8TV	
2013	Projek 3R	Herself	TV3	
2014	She's The Boss		Capital TV	
2014	Makmal Masak		TV9	
2015	Inspirasi Dekor		TV1	
2018	Sensasi Bola	Herself	Hypp Sensasi	Host
2019	Sepahtu Reunion Live	Herself	Astro Warna	Guest star
