= Pasal Kau! =

2020 Malaysian action romantic comedy film

- Directed by: Adrian Teh
- Screenplay by: Nazri Annuar
- Story by: Hairul Azreen
- Produced by: Adrian Teh
- Starring: Hairul Azreen; Janna Nick; Amerul Affendi; Namron; Henley Hii; Theeban G; Josiah Hogan; Hafizul Kamal; Taufiq Hanafi
- Cinematography: Yong Choon Lin
- Edited by: Lee Pai Seang
- Production company: ACT 2 Pictures
- Distributed by: Netflix
- Release date: 1 October 2020 (Netflix)
- Running time: 112 minutes
- Country: Malaysia
- Languages: Malay; English

Pasal Kau!, also known as All Because of You!, is a 2020 Malaysian Malay-language action romantic comedy film. It tells the story of two hotel workers named Aiman and Jane, who discover their feelings towards each other when the seaside luxury hotel is suddenly held hostage by kidnappers.

It was released on 1 October 2020 on Netflix.

The film is directed by Adrian Teh. It is the first Netflix Malaysian original film.

== Synopsis ==
Hotel staff Aiman (Hairul Azreen) is a happy-go-lucky boy working at a seaside resort hotel. His female colleague, Jane (Janna Nick) has a secret crush on him. One day Aiman falls in love with a guest Sofia. But things go worse when the hotel is suddenly held hostage by a group of kidnappers. Aiman and his friends must band together to come up with an action-packed plan to save the day. And Aiman might discover that his heart may lie with someone else after all. How will their story go?

== Cast ==
=== Main casts ===
- Hairul Azreen as Aiman
- Janna Nick as Jane
- Amerul Affendi as Parjo
- Henley Hii as Josh
- Namron as Maznan
- Theebaan G as MC
- Taufiq Hanafi as Wak
- Hafizul Kamal as Yop
- Josiah Hogan as Tengku Iskandar
- Sophia Albarakbah as Sofia
- Sugeeta Chandran as Maria
- Anna Jobling as Emelia

=== Other casts ===
- Ropie Cecupak as Jet
- Dain Iskandar Said as Duke
- Yayan Ruhian as Maman
- Jasmine Suraya Chin as herself
- Fify Azmi as Vee
- Ismi Melinda as Zain
- Adrian Teh as hotel staff

== Production ==
The film is adapted from an idea pitched by Hairul Azreen. It features almost all actors and actresses from director Adrian Teh's previous films PASKAL: The Movie (2018) and Wira (2019), with new cast Janna Nick as one of the main characters. It was filmed in Desaru Coast, Johor.

Originally scheduled to be released theatrically, the film was then bought by streaming platform Netflix as originals.
