= Asyraf =

Asyraf is a Malay given name. It is derived from the Arabic root “sharafa” (شرف), meaning “noble,” “honorable,” or “most distinguished.”

Notable people with this given name include:

- Amar Asyraf (born 1986), South Korean-born Malaysian actor
- Amirul Asyraf Suhaidi (born 1994), Malaysian football player
- Asyraf Wajdi Dusuki (born 1976), Malaysian politician
- Famirul Asyraf Sayuti (born 1989), Malaysian football player
- Khairul Asyraf (footballer, born December 1994), Malaysian footballer for Penang
- Khairul Asyraf (footballer, born March 1994), Malaysian footballer for UiTM
- Muhd Asyraf Azan (born 1988), Malaysian squash player
