= Hanis Zalikha =

Malaysian actor (born 1990)

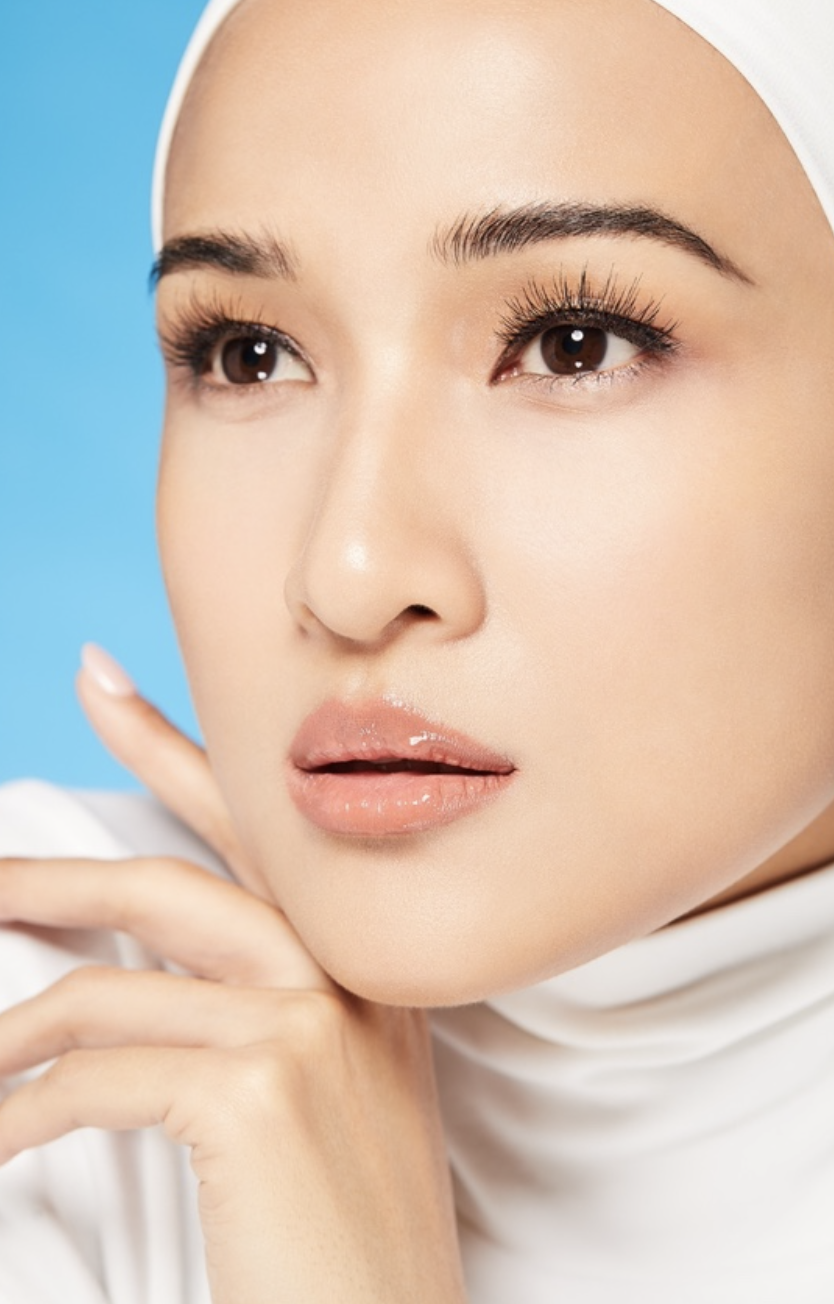
- Born: Hanis Zalikha binti Zainal Rashid; 9 October 1990 (age 35); Kuala Lumpur, Malaysia
- Education: Universiti Teknologi MARA, Segamat
- Occupations: Model; Actress; TV Host; Entrepreneur
- Years active: 2008–present
- Spouse: Hairul Azreen (m. 2015)
- Children: Yusuf Iskandar; Alisa Aisyah
- Parents: Zainal Rashid (father); Nani Rostam (mother)
- Website: inibelogsaya.blogspot.com

Hanis Zalikha Zainal Rashid (born 9 October 1990) is a Malaysian model, actress, television host, entrepreneur, and blogger. She has also been nominated for the Most Influential Blog Award in 2011.

== Early life ==
She is the second child of seven siblings. Her mother, Nani Rostam was a model in the 1980s. She participated in an online reality television competition, Malaysian Dreamgirl in 2008. She became the second runner up in the competition. In 2010, she was ranked sixth in the Top 10 Fastest Rising People in Google Malaysia Top Searches 2010 chart. Additionally, she was ranked in the top ten in Google Zeitgeist 2011 search.

== Education ==
She received early education at Sekolah Kebangsaan Seri Selangor (1997), Sekolah Kebangsaan USJ 8 (1998) and Sekolah Kebangsaan Seafield (1999–2002). At the secondary level, she attended Sekolah Menengah Kebangsaan USJ 4 (2003), Seafield National High School (2004–2006) and Sekolah Menengah Kebangsaan Seksyen 9 (2007). In 2012, she graduated with a diploma in Business Management from Universiti Teknologi MARA, Segamat, Johor. In addition, she received the Vice Chancellor Award with a Cumulative Grade Average Rating (CGPA) of 3.9. She also intends to pursue her studies at a bachelor's degree level apart from opening her own beauty products business after graduation.

== Personal life ==
Hanis Zalikha has been married to Hairul Azreen since 5 June 2015. She has two children; Yusuf Iskandar born on 3 June 2016, and Alisa Aisyah born on 24 May 2019. They also have a cat, Bujibu Chempel.

Yusuf and Bujibu had a reality show starring the two, titled My Little Heroes — Yusuf & Bujibu. The show ran for eight episodes on Astro Ria and Ria HD in Malaysia.

== Filmography ==
=== Films ===
Year	Title	Role	Notes
2009	Momok The Movie	Mawar Puteri Bunian	
2013	Gangster Celop	Suzana	
2015	Romeo Kota	Inspector Elina	
2022	The Assistant	Yasmin Azri	Cameo appearance

=== Television series ===
Year	Title	Role	TV channel	Notes
2013	Memberku Hawa	Hanis	TV9	
2014	Jodoh 2	Zara	Astro Ria	
2014	Suamiku Encik Sotong	Dhia Adirra	Astro Ria	
2015	Ku Tinggalkan Cinta Di Okinawa	Alisa	Astro Mustika HD	

=== Television movies ===
Year	Title	Role	TV channel
2012	Mariam Kampung Putat	Mariam	TV3
2013	Aku Benci Mama	Liana	TV3
2013	Mama-Mama Mia	Keisya	Astro Ria
2014	Anak Patung	Dewi	Astro Ria
2015	Aku, Dia dan C70	Elisya	TVi

=== Web drama ===
Year	Title	Role	Platform
2013	Pertama Kali	Lara Sofea	Tonton Extra

=== Serial television programmes ===
Year	Title	Role	TV channel	Notes
2008	Malaysian Dreamgirl	Herself	Malaysian Dreamgirl TV	She was the second runner-up for the first season of the programme, beating 12 other players.
2012	Primadona	Herself	Astro Mustika HD	She was invited to express her views on fashion.
2012	Mad Markets (Season 1)	Herself	TV9	Travel and shopping series
2015	Mad Markets (Season 2)	Herself	TV9	Travel and shopping series
2015	Muzik Xtra	Herself	TVi	She discussed the development of music.
2015	Tutor TV SPM Bahasa Melayu	Herself	Astro Tutor TV SPM	
2015	MeleTOP	Herself	Astro Ria	
2015	AF Buzz	Herself	Astro Ria	She and Zizan Razak discussed the performance of AF 2013 participants with invited guests.
2015	Terus Gempak....Inilah AF 2013	Herself	Astro Ria	She and Zizan Razak discussed the performance of AF 2013 participants with invited guests.
2015	Raikan Cinta (Season 2)	Herself	Astro Ria	
2015	Ceria Superstar (Season 2)	Herself	Astro Ceria	She joined the invitation jury for the programme.
2015	Anugerah Blockbuster 2	Herself	Astro Mustika HD	along with Tasha Shilla, Hefny Sahad and Hafizul Kamal.
2015	Pertama Kali	Lara Sofea	Tonton.my	The drama is aired online via.
2014	Wanita Hari Ini	Herself	TV3	She was invited to discuss health tips.
2014	Anugerah MeleTOP	Herself	Astro Maya HD	
2017	Romantika (Season 7)	Pasangan Pilihan	Astro Ria	

== Achievements ==
Year	Award	Notes	Result
2011	Most Influential Blog Award	The award was nominated through the inaugural Nuffnang Asia Pacific Blog Awards 2011 in Singapore.	Nominated
2014	Artis Baru Wanita Popular	She was listed as the top five candidates for ABPBH 2013.	Nominated
2025	Nona Celebrity Business Award	Received the Nona Celebrity Business Award at the Nona Superwoman Award 2024.	Won
