= Daulat (2020 film) =

2020 Malaysian Malay-language political thriller film

- Directed by: Imran Sheik
- Written by: Haziq Jamaludin; Imran Sheik
- Produced by: Siti Marzuliana Marzuki
- Starring: Vanida Imran; Rashidi Ishak; Tony Eusoff; Jasmine Suraya Chin; Cristina Suzanne Stockstill; Zul Zamir
- Cinematography: Nurhanisham Muhammad
- Edited by: Johan Bahar
- Production company: Lacuna Pictures
- Release date: 6 April 2020 (online)
- Running time: 101 minutes
- Country: Malaysia
- Languages: Malay; English

Daulat (English: Sovereignty) is a 2020 Malaysian Malay-language political thriller film written and directed by Imran Sheik. It tells the story of a politician (Vanidah Imran) and her party plotting a feisty political comeback after having just lost the last election, ready to do whatever it takes to win.

It was released on 6 April 2020 online on Iflix.

== Synopsis ==
The ruling political party MUNA has lost in the recent general election. Hassan, the party's president employs Suri, a rising female politician as the party's new deputy president. Suri decides to go all out to make sure that the party wins in the next general election, at all costs. Willing to pay any price, she and the team initiates an elaborate plan to attain power.

As part of her cunning strategy, Suri plots with her husband, Idrus and takes advantage of his position and power as the CEO of a national news company to create slander and propaganda against the rival party. A young journalist, Jasmin is involved as she becomes responsible for spreading this news. Jasmin feels obligated to play her part as she owes Idrus for her father’s life which later turns into a love affair. What happens next?

== Cast ==
- Vanida Imran as Suri, Deputy president of opposition party MUNA
- Rashidi Ishak as Idrus, CEO of media company Media Raya; husband of Suri.
- Tony Eusoff as Hassan, President of opposition party MUNA
- Cristina Suzanne Stockstill as Nadiya Hassan, COO of Media Raya; daughter of Hassan.
- Jasmine Suraya Chin as Jasmin Cho, A journalist at Media Raya
- Zul Zamir as Ali Fahim, Deputy prime minister from ruling party WAWASAN
- Jalaluddin Hassan as Malik, Prime minister from WAWASAN
- Sangeeta Krishnasamy as Melissa, A liberal politician
- Amar Asyraf as Saiful, President of party Hizbul Muslimin
- Dain Iskandar Said as Political analyst

== Release ==
The film is fictional and was made in 2019 before the event of 2020 Malaysian political crisis. It is filmed in 14 days with a budget of RM500,000.

The film is released online for free and uncensored, on 6 April 2020 exclusively for Iflix after a series of private screenings with industry experts and close enthusiastic cineastes. The production team originally opted for a theatrical release, but decided to distribute in streaming service to avoid cuts by the Film Censorship Board of Malaysia.
