= Racun Rihanna =

Upcoming Malaysian television series

- Promotional poster
- English: Rihanna's Venom
- Genre: Melodrama; Tragedy; Revenge
- Directed by: Islah Canrose Abdul; Ejump Mohd
- Starring: Intan Najuwa; Rita Rudaini; Azah Aziz; Jasmine Suraya
- Country of origin: Malaysia
- Original language: Malay
- No. of episodes: 15

Production
- Running time: 35 minutes
- Production company: Zeel Production

Original release
- Network: TV3
- Release: April 30, 2024 – present

Racun Rihanna (transl. Rihanna's Venom) is a Malaysian television series, directed by Islah Canrose Abdul and Ejump Mohd, starring Intan Najuwa in the title role, along with Rita Rudaini, Azah Aziz and Jasmine Suraya. It premiered on TV3, Slot Samarinda on April 30, 2024, and airs every Monday to Thursday at 22:00 (MST).

== Synopsis ==
Racun Rihanna tells the story of three friends during their university days, namely Marya, Fateni, and Ayumi. They made Rihanna an adopted sister in their lives. But one night, a tragedy happened when three of her adopted sisters accidentally pranked her and tricked her with drugs until Rihanna was gang-raped. Rihanna's dark dream destroyed her life in an instant.

== Cast ==
=== Main ===
- Intan Najuwa as Rihanna
  - Arena Lieya as Rihanna (teen)
- Rita Rudaini as Marya
  - Hanna Halim as Marya (teen)
- Azah Aziz as Fateeni
  - Serra Kamal as Fateeni (teen)
- Jasmine Suraya as Ayumi
  - Puteri Khareeza as Ayumi (teen)

=== Supporting ===
- Michelle Wee Melodi
- Mas Anizan
- Jabir Meftah
- Aizat Saha

== Soundtrack ==
Released on March, 22, 2024
No.	Title	Music	Singer	Length
1.	"Dilemma"	Farouk Roman	Kaka Azraff	4:37
