= Ribbit (film) =

- Film poster
- Directed by: Chuck Powers
- Screenplay by: Chuck Powers; Amir Hafizi
- Story by: Chuck Powers
- Produced by: Shireen M. Hashim
- Starring: Sean Astin; Tim Curry; Russell Peters; Cherami Leigh
- Edited by: Ezaisyirwan Basri
- Music by: Edry Abdul Halim
- Production companies: Crest Animation Studios; Western Pictures
- Distributed by: KRU Studios
- Release dates: 21 June 2014 (Niagara Integrated Film Festival); 4 September 2014 (Malaysia)
- Running time: 88 minutes
- Country: Malaysia
- Languages: English; Malay

Ribbit is a 2014 Malaysian animated comedy film produced by KRU Studios and Crest Animation Studios Western Pictures. It is directed by Chuck Powers from a screenplay by Powers and Hamir Afizi and features the voices of Sean Astin, Russell Peters, Tim Curry, and Cherami Leigh.

== Synopsis ==
All his life, Ribbit has felt different from all the other frogs. To find purpose in his life, Ribbit embarks on an incredible journey through the Amazon biome. During this journey, Ribbit is accidentally hypnotised into believing he is a human prince trapped in a frog's body. Convinced that he now understands why he is different, Ribbit heads out in his search for the Princess whose kiss will solve all his problems. Joined by his best friend, a female squirrel named Sandy, Ribbit encounters an amazingly zany cast of unique and colourful characters.

== Cast ==
- Sean Astin as Ribbit, a poison dart frog with an identity crisis, the main protagonist
- Russell Peters as Deepak, a bat with the answers to life's questions
- Tim Curry as Terrence, a toucan with a flair for colours
- Cherami Leigh as Sandy, a female flying squirrel who is Ribbit's best friend
- Elza Irdalynna as Rafa and Luciano, two ocelot cubs
- Amelia Henderson as Marcella, Rafa and Luciano's sister
- Abigail Cole as Bianca, a baby howler monkey
- Lydia Lubon as Carla, Bianca's mother
- Carey Van Driest as Avelina, Carla's sister
- Chuck Powers as Grandpa, Carla and Avelina's father
- Sonny Franks as Kai, a caiman who lives in a waterfall and the main antagonist
- Christina Orow as Jojo, a manatee
- Sonny Franks as Ollie, Jojo's partner
- Kennie Dowle as the spider
- Valentine Cawley as the Witch Doctor, the secondary antagonist
- Martin Dysart as Inego.
- Dilly Shakir as Callie, Inego's wife
- Ali Astin as the Princess, future leader of an Amazonian tribe

== Production ==
The film is co-produced by KRU Studios and Crest Animation Studios with partial financing from the Malaysian government's Multimedia Development Corporation. The development and post-production work was entirely completed in Cyberjaya, Malaysia, while the animation took place in Cyberjaya, Malaysia and Mumbai, India, and most of the rendering was done in Hong Kong. The lead voices were recorded in Los Angeles with additional voices recorded in Dallas, Texas and Kuala Lumpur, Malaysia.

== Music ==
The film's main musical theme is Magical Moment, a duet by American R&B group Az Yet and Jaclyn Victor, winner of Malaysian Idol. The other song on the original sound track is Destiny, produced by DJ Motiv8 and performed by SuPreme featuring Felice LaZae.

== Release ==
The film was presented at the Cannes Film Market in 2012 at the project stage. It premiered at the Niagara Integrated Film Festival on 21 June 2014 where it won Best Family Film. It was released theatrically in Malaysia on 4 September 2014. It was released in the United States on DVD on 25 November 2014.
