= Amelia Henderson =

Malaysian actress, model and TV presenter (born 1995)

- Henderson on 20 September 2026
- Born: Amelia Thripura Henderson; 20 October 1995 (age 30); Klang, Selangor, Malaysia
- Occupation: Actor
- Years active: 2006–present
- Parent(s): Graham L. Henderson (father); Dr. Jaya Rudralingam (mother)

Amelia Thripura Henderson, born 20 October 1995 in Selangor) is a Malaysian-British actor.

== Early life ==
Amelia Thripura Henderson was born in Klang, Selangor, Malaysia, and she is the daughter of a Malaysian dentist mother of Ceylonese descent, Dr. Jaya Rudralingam and a Scottish architect father, Graham L. Henderson. She has a younger brother named Alexander Rudrakeith Henderson. Henderson is a Malaysian-British dual national as she attained British citizenship from her father through birth.

== Personal life ==
Henderson wed a member of the Kedah royal family, Dato’ Indera Tunku Harrunnarasheed Putra bin Tunku Annuar in 2015. Following the wedding, Henderson was conferred the honorific form of address as "Yang Berbahagia Datin Indera Amelia Thripura Henderson". The couple divorced after 3 years of marriage in 2018. They have no children.

In 2022, she was accused of a breach of contract for A. Aida's drama project of Sekali Lagi Cinta Kembali, and brought the case to the court stating she did "nothing wrong". The court ruled in A. Aida's favor in April 2023 and Henderson was ordered to pay RM200,000 to the production. However, she won an appeal in the High Court in October 2023 but was ordered to pay RM10,000 compensation to the production.

== Filmography ==
=== Film ===
==== Feature films ====
| Year | Title | Role | Notes |
|---|---|---|---|
| 2009 | Talentime | Melati | |
| 2009 | Pisau Cukur | Young Bella | |
| 2012 | SeeFood | Ruby | Voice role |
| 2012 | War of the Worlds: Goliath | Young Girl | Voice role |
| 2014 | Ribbit | Marcella | Voice role; English version |
| 2021 | J2: J Retribusi | Amy | |
| 2023 | Didi & Friends: The Movie | Captain Zee | Voice role |
| 2023 | Pulau | Kat | |
| 2024 | Harimau Malaya: The Untold Journey | Inaya | |
| 2025 | Blood Brothers | Sheila | |
| 2025 | Keluang Man | Kathy Ismail | |
| 2025 | Magik Rompak | Wawa | |

==== Television films ====
| Year | Title | Role | Network |
|---|---|---|---|
| 2016 | Anak Mat Salleh Tapi Melayu | Mary | TV3 |
| 2018 | Renjana | Nora | ntv7 |
| 2018 | DM Hati Awak | Izza | ntv7 |
| 2018 | 30 Hari Membunuh Cinta | Rara | Astro Citra |
| 2018 | Nadi Luna | Fira | TV3 |
| 2022 | Bourgainvillea | Nina | TV2 |

=== Television series ===
| Year | Title | Role | Network | Notes |
|---|---|---|---|---|
| 2006 | Keluarga Adam | | TV2 | |
| 2008 | Kasut Tumit Tinggi | | Astro Prima | |
| 2013 | Ninja Cat, Ichi Ni San! | Eager Beaver, Nicole / The Paw | TV9 | Voice role |
| 2015 | Knowsy Nina Wants To Know | Knowsy Nina | TV apps | Voice role |
| 2015 | Keluarga Pontimau | Sabrina | TV3 | |
| 2016 | Oh My English!: After School | Amelia | Astro TVIQ, Astro Maya HD | |
| 2018 | Jangan Benci Cintaku | Damia | TV3 | |
| 2018 | Pengantin 100 Hari | Erina | TV3 | |
| 2019 | Cinta Non Grata | Darlina | TV3 | |
| 2019 | Voice Note | Mira | TV3 | |
| 2019 | Hilang Kasih di Sarajevo | Emina | Suria | |
| 2020 | Rindu Yang Terindah | Airis Warda | TV3 | |
| 2020 | Pengantin Satu Malam | Zulaikha Nasreen | TV3 | |
| 2021 | Romantika 4 Hari 3 Malam | Lana Analia | TV3 | |
| 2021 | Cik Ayu Mee Sanggul | Cik Ayu | Astro Ria | |
| 2021 | Kisah Cinta Kita | Natasha / Aleesa | TV3 | |
| 2023 | One Million Dollar Voice | Zana | Astro Ria | |
| 2024 | I.D. | Anggun Zahara | Astro Premier | |

=== Television ===
| Year | Title | Role | Network | Notes |
|---|---|---|---|---|
| 2008 | Sugar Pals | Gloria/Bernice | TV2 | Voice role |
| 2009 | The English Room | Host | Astro TVIQ | |
| 2010 | The English Room: Let's Talk! | Host | Astro TVIQ | |
| 2013 | SPM English Literature Component | Host | Astro Tutor TV SPM | |
| 2015 | MYEG Daily/SuperSport Daily/Dashing Daily | Host | Astro Supersport | |
| 2015–2016 | GO TRAVEL | Host | GOASEAN | |
| 2016 | B Healthy | Host | Astro Bella | |
| 2019 | Dewi Remaja | Host | Astro Ria | |
| 2020 | Kelas #DudukRumah | Cameo | Astro Tutor TV | |
| 2020 | Ohsem!!! | Host | Awesome TV | |
| 2022 | Roller Kata | Host (season 2) | Awesome TV | |
| 2022–present | Gempak Most Wanted | Host | Astro Ria | with Sean Lee |
| 2023 | Gempak Most Wanted Awards 2022 | Host | Astro Ria | with Sean Lee, Radin Amir Affendy & Elly Mazlein |
| 2023 | Sepahtu Reunion Al-Puasa | Sally | Astro Warna | Episode: "Di Mana Jodohku" |
| 2023 | TikTok Awards Malaysia 2023 | Host | TV3 | with Izzue Islam & Sherry Alhadad |
| 2024 | Gempak Most Wanted Awards 2023 | Host | Astro Ria | with Sean Lee, Sherry Alhadad & Zizan Razak |
| 2025 | Gempak Most Wanted Awards 2024 | Host | Astro Ria | with Sean Lee & Sherry Alhadad |

== Awards and nominations ==
| Year | Award | Category | Nominated work | Result | Ref. |
|---|---|---|---|---|---|
| 2016 | 5th Stail EH! Awards | Most Promising Celebrities | —N/a | Nominated | |
| 2017 | 6th Stail EH! Awards | Most Sexy Female Celebrities | —N/a | Nominated | |
| 2019 | Face of Malaysia Awards | Celebrity Star of the Year | —N/a | Won | |
| 2019 | 14th Asia Model Awards | Model Star Award – Malaysia | —N/a | Won | |
| 2019 | 2nd Instafamous Awards | Stylish Instafamous Award | —N/a | Won | |
| 2019 | 32nd Bintang Popular Berita Harian Awards | Most Popular Female New Artist | Jangan Benci Cintaku | Nominated | |
| 2022 | 6th World Outstanding Grandmasters Excellence Award | Malaysia Most Outstanding Best Actress Excellence Award | —N/a | Won | |
