= Adrian Teh =

Malaysian film producer and director

- 郑建国
- Born: Adrian Teh Kean Kok; 1 September 1984 (age 42); Penang, Malaysia
- Occupations: Film producer, film director & Chief Executive Officer in ACT 2 Pictures
- Years active: 2010—present
- Notable work: PASKAL; WIRA; MALBATT: Misi Bakara; Gold; Reversi; Magik Rompak

Chinese name
- Traditional Chinese: 鄭建國
- Simplified Chinese: 郑建国
Transcriptions
Standard Mandarin
- Hanyu Pinyin: Zhèng Jiànguó
Southern Min
- Hokkien POJ: Tēⁿ Kiàn-kok
- Tâi-lô: Tēnn Kiàn-kok

Adrian Teh Kean Kok (born 1 September 1984) is a Malaysian film producer and director known from PASKAL, WIRA, MALBATT: Misi Bakara, Reversi and Magik Rompak.

== Career ==
Adrian Teh is one of the renowned director and producer in Malaysia. He founded and presided over the Chinese Film Association of Malaysia in 2012, and organized Malaysia's first ever Chinese movies awards ceremony – the Golden Wau Awards – in 2013. He is highly recognized as one of the Top-10 Outstanding Youths of Malaysia in 2016, (JCI TOYM) and was named in the 2016 list of 100 Most Influential Young Entrepreneurs (MIYE 2016).

Adrian has directed numerous Malaysian Chinese movies, including “Lelio Popo”, “The Wedding Diary”, “The Wedding Diary 2”, “King of Mahjong” & etc. In 2018, he directed Malaysia's first military action-packed movie that is based on true events - “PASKAL: The Movie”. PASKAL recorded RM30.08 million in box office sales across Malaysia and Singapore.

Since then, Adrian started to explore further in Malay film industry. In 2019, he directed an action-packed movie – “WIRA”. In order to make it a world class action film, he's managed to hire renowned Indonesian action star Yayan Ruhian, who had involved in few Hollywood movies to choreograph the action sequences in the film.

In 2020, he attends to many new challenges. He directed his first Malay rom-com - “Pasal Kau!” (All Because Of You) – the first Netflix Malaysian original film which is available in over 190 countries. Besides, he directed his first suspense-thriller series – “Model Family”, the first original production by Celestial Tiger Entertainment / Thrill.

He got the recognition by Tatler Asia as '2021 Asia Most Influential MY'.

He directed and produced the most expensive film in Malaysia, MALBATT: Misi Bakara that release on cinema starts 24 August 2023.

== Filmography ==
=== Films ===
Year	Title	Credited as			Notes
Year	Title	Director	Producer	Writer	Notes
2010	Ice Kacang Puppy Love	No	Executive	No	
2010	Lelio Popo	Yes	No	No	
2012	The Wedding Diary	Yes	No	No	
2012	The Golden Couple	No	Executive	No	
2013	The Wedding Diary II	Yes	No	No	
2014	Balistik	No	Executive	No	
2014	The Great Lion Kun Seng Keng	No	Executive	No	
2014	Hungry Ghost Ritual	No	Executive	Yes	
2014	Reclaim	No	Co-producer	No	
2015	Find My Dad	No	Yes	No	
2015	The Noise	Yes	No	No	
2015	King of Mahjong	Yes	No	No	
2016	Let's Eat	No	Executive	No	
2017	Goodbye Mr Loser	Yes	No	No	
2018	PASKAL: The Movie	Yes	No	Yes	Captain Stanley, as actor
2019	Wira	Yes	Yes	Yes	
2020	Pasal Kau!	Yes	Yes	No	Hotel staff; as actor
2021	Ada Hantu	No	Yes	Yes	
2022	The Assistant	Yes	Yes	Yes	
2022	Ada Hantu 2	No	Yes	Yes	
2023	MALBATT: Misi Bakara	Yes	Yes	Yes	Imran; as actor
2023	La Luna	No	Executive	No	
2024	Gold	Yes	Yes	Yes	
2024	Reversi	Yes	Yes	Yes	Aikido instructor; as actor
2025	Martabat: Misi Berdarah	Yes	Yes	Yes	
2025	Magik Rompak	Yes	Yes	Yes	
2025	Badak	No	Co-executive	No	
2026	The Furious: Pertaruhan Maruah	No	Yes	Yes	
2026	Chelot	Yes	Yes	No	

=== Television series ===
Year	Title	Credited as		Notes
Year	Title	Director	Producer	Notes
2021	Model Family	Yes	No	
2021–2022	Dukun Diva	No	Yes	
2022	3AM	No	Yes	
2025	Sinister	No	Yes	
