= Injective (blockchain) =

Denominations
- Code: INJ

Development
- Original author(s): Eric Chen; Albert Chon
- White paper: https://injective.com/INJ_Tokenomics_Paper.pdf
- Initial release: 2018; 8 years ago
- Code repository: https://github.com/injectivelabs
- Development status: Active
- Source model: Open source

Ledger
- Block explorer: https://explorer.injective.network/

Website
- Website: injective.com

Injective (INJ) is a blockchain optimized for Web3 finance.

== History ==
Injective was launched by Injective Labs, which was founded by Eric Chen and Albert Chon in 2018 through the first incubation program hosted by Binance Labs.

In December, Injective launched a Testnet for a DeFi trading platform built on top of its layer. In April 2021, the platform raised $10 million in a "party" funding round with participation from billionaire Mark Cuban.

In July, Injective underwent a "CosmWasm mainnet" upgrade in order to bring scalable smart contracts to Injective.

In January 2023, Injective launched a $150 million fund ecosystem initiative to accelerate interoperable infrastructure and DeFi adoption.
