= About Time (2013 film) =

Film by Richard Curtis

- Theatrical release poster
- Directed by: Richard Curtis
- Written by: Richard Curtis
- Produced by: Tim Bevan; Eric Fellner; Nicky Kentish Barnes
- Starring: Domhnall Gleeson; Rachel McAdams; Bill Nighy; Tom Hollander; Margot Robbie
- Cinematography: John Guleserian
- Edited by: Mark Day
- Music by: Nick Laird-Clowes
- Production companies: Working Title Films; Relativity Media
- Distributed by: Universal Pictures
- Release dates: 27 June 2013 (EIFF); 4 September 2013 (United Kingdom); 1 November 2013 (United States)
- Running time: 123 minutes
- Countries: United Kingdom; United States
- Language: English
- Budget: $12 million
- Box office: $88.5 million

About Time is a 2013 romantic fantasy comedy-drama film written and directed by Richard Curtis, and starring Domhnall Gleeson, Rachel McAdams, and Bill Nighy.

The film is about a young man with the ability to time travel who tries to change his past in hopes of improving his future. The film was released in the United Kingdom on 4 September 2013.

The film received mixed reviews from critics. At the box office, it grossed $87.1 million against a $12 million budget. It was dedicated to actor Richard Griffiths, who died a few months before the film's release, marking his final film appearance.

== Plot ==
Tim Lake grows up in Cornwall with his father James, mother Mary, uncle Desmond, and younger sister Katherine ("Kit Kat"). The morning after a less-than-great New Year’s Eve party, James tells Tim that the men of their family can travel back in time to moments they have lived before. Tim tests this by going back to the previous night’s party and changing a few events. When he returns, James discourages him from using his gift to acquire money or fame, due to the boredom felt by other family members. Tim decides to use it to improve his love life.

The following summer, Kit Kat's friend Charlotte visits. Although instantly smitten, Tim waits until the last day to tell her; she tells him he should have told her earlier. Tim travels back in time to tell Charlotte in the middle of the holiday, but she suggests he wait until her last day. Heartbroken, he realises that she is uninterested in him and time travel cannot change anyone's mind.

Tim moves to London to pursue a career as a lawyer, initially living with his father's acquaintance Harry, a playwright. He visits a Dans le Noir restaurant, where he meets Mary, an American who works for a publisher. They flirt in the darkness, and she gives Tim her phone number. He returns home to a distraught Harry, whose play's opening night has been ruined by an actor forgetting his lines. Tim goes back in time to help the actor so the play is a triumph.

However, when Tim tries to call Mary, he discovers that by going back to help Harry, the evening with her never occurred so he does not have her number. Recalling Mary's obsession with Kate Moss, he attends a Kate Moss exhibition every day until he sees Mary.

Having never met Tim, she is confused but allows him to join her and her friend. During lunch, he discovers that she now has a boyfriend. Tim goes back to when they met, turning up before the potential boyfriend arrives, and persuades Mary to leave with him.

Their relationship develops, and Tim moves in with Mary. One night, he encounters Charlotte, who is now interested in him, but he turns down the invitation of intimacy as he is in love with Mary. Tim returns home and proposes. They marry, and shortly afterwards have a baby daughter, Posy.

Kit Kat's toxic relationship and employment struggles lead her to drunkenly crash her car on Posy's first birthday. Tim decides to intervene: he prevents the crash and, breaking the tradition of keeping the time travel ability secret, takes her back to avert the bad relationship. Returning to the present, he finds that Posy has never been born but he has a son instead. James explains that changing events prior to their children's birth may alter the exact child conceived.

Tim accepts that he cannot solve his sister's problems by changing her past; he lets the crash happen, ensuring Posy's birth, and he and Mary help Kit Kat face her problems. She settles down with Tim's friend Jay. Tim and Mary have another child, a boy.

Tim learns that James has terminal lung cancer and time travel cannot change it, as going back to remove his smoking would undo his and Kit Kat's conceptions. His father has known his illness would come for some time, and so has been travelling back in time to extend his life and spend more time with his family.

He tells Tim to live each day twice to be truly happy: first, with all the everyday tensions and worries, but the second time noticing how sweet the world can be. Tim follows this advice; his father dies, but on the day of the funeral, Tim travels to the past to visit his father.

Mary tells Tim that she wants a third child. He is reluctant as he will not be able to visit his father again. Tim tells James, so together they travel back to relive a happy memory from Tim's childhood, taking care not to change the experience to avoid causing changes to the present.

Mary gives birth to another girl. Jay and Kit Kat, very happy together, have their first child. The family accepts the loss of James, and Tim realises that it is better to live each day once only. He ultimately decides to not time travel at all and comes to appreciate life with his family as if he is living it for the second time.

== Cast ==
- Domhnall Gleeson as Tim Lake
- Rachel McAdams as Mary
- Bill Nighy as James Lake
- Lydia Wilson as Kit Kat
- Lindsay Duncan as Mary Lake
- Richard Cordery as Uncle Desmond
- Joshua McGuire as Rory
- Tom Hollander as Harry Chapman
- Margot Robbie as Charlotte
- Will Merrick as Jay
- Vanessa Kirby as Joanna
- Tom Hughes as Jimmy Kincade
- Clemmie Dugdale as Ginger Jenny
- Harry Hadden-Paton as Rupert
- Mitchell Mullen as Mary's Father, Fitz
- Lisa Eichhorn as Mary's Mother, Jean
- Jenny Rainsford as Polly

Richard Griffiths and Richard E. Grant make uncredited appearances as stage actors in Harry's play, with the former's being his final film role.

== Production ==
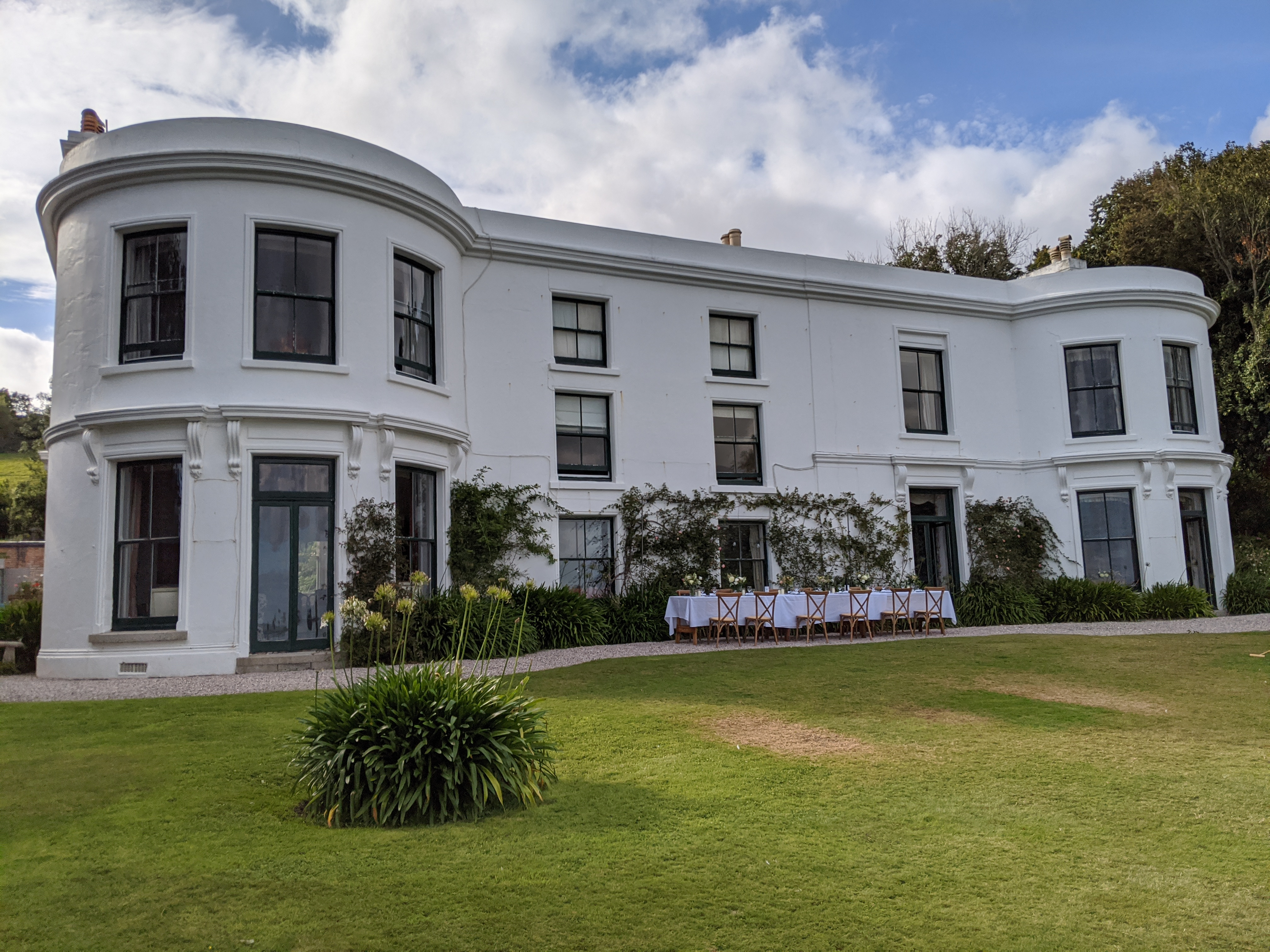
The grade II listed Porthpean House acted as Tim's family home.

By Curtis's own admission the conception of the idea "was a slow growth". The genesis of the idea came when Curtis was eating lunch with a friend and the subject of happiness came up. Upon admitting he was not truly happy in life, the conversation turned towards him describing an ideal day. From here Curtis realised that the day of the lunch, for him, constituted such a day, which led to him deciding to write a film about "how you achieve happiness in ordinary life". Thinking that the concept was too "simple" he decided to add a time travel element to the film.

Although the production contracted out various effect houses to try to make the time-traveling effects feel like more of a spectacle, they found the resulting work "just completely wrong" tonally and instead focused on a more low-key approach. Curtis has opined "that in the end, it turns out to be a kind of anti-time travel movie. It uses all the time travel stuff but without it feeling like it's a science fiction thing particularly or without it feeling that time travel can actually solve your life."

Curtis is primarily known as a screenwriter, and About Time was only his third ever film as a director (plus one television short); he said the film was likely to be his last film as director, but that he will continue in the film industry.

Zooey Deschanel had been in talks for the role of Mary, but ultimately, the role went to McAdams.

== Release ==
About Time's initial release was set for 10 May 2013 but was pushed back to 1 November 2013. It premiered on 8 August 2013 as part of the Film4 Summer Screen outdoor cinema series at the historic Somerset House in London. It was released in the United Kingdom on 4 September 2013. It received a limited US release on 1 November, with a general release on 8 November 2013.

The film became a surprise success in South Korea, where it was watched by more than three million people, one of the highest numbers among the foreign romantic comedy films released in Korea. It grossed a total of $23,434,443 there, its highest country total.

=== Home media ===
Universal Pictures Home Entertainment released About Time on DVD and Blu-ray on February 4, 2014.

== Reception ==
About Time received mixed to favorable reviews from critics. On the review aggregator website Rotten Tomatoes, the film holds an approval rating of 71% based on 168 reviews, with an average rating of 6.4/10. The website's critics consensus reads, "Beautifully filmed and unabashedly sincere, About Time finds director Richard Curtis at his most sentimental." Metacritic, which uses a weighted average, assigned a score of 55 out of 100, based on reviews from 34 critics, indicating "mixed or average" reviews.

Catherine Shoard of The Guardian compared the film to Groundhog Day noting it "is about as close to home as a homage can get without calling in the copyright team" and describes Domhnall Gleeson as a "ginger Hugh Grant", which "at first, is unnerving; as About Time marches on, Gleeson's innate charm gleams through and this weird disconnection becomes quite compelling." Shoard gave the film two stars out of five. Robbie Collin of The Daily Telegraph praised the comic timing of McAdams and Gleeson, but criticised the film, comparing it to a quilt, calling it "soft, frayed at the edges, and oh so comfortable" and gives it three stars out of five.

Leslie Felperin of Variety called the film "reassuringly bland" and says there is a sense of déjà vu, especially for anyone who has seen The Time Traveler's Wife, also co-starring McAdams. Unlike that film, she has no knowledge of his powers in About Time, resulting in a "fundamental lack of honesty in their relationship." Felperin noted British reverse snobbery would put many off this and other Curtis films, but that this would be less of a problem among American Anglophiles and those willing to suspend disbelief, taking the characters as British "versions of Woody Allen's Manhattanites (but with less angst)". Felperin praised the chemistry of the leading couple "that keeps the film aloft" and the supporting cast, while also criticising the stock characters as being too familiar.

In 2025, it was one of the films voted for the "Readers' Choice" edition of The New York Times' list of "The 100 Best Movies of the 21st Century," finishing at number 160.

=== Plot holes ===
Critics have pointed to the film's plot holes relating to time travel; how big or how many plot holes varied with the reviewer. Kate Erbland of Film School Rejects noted: "The rules and limitations of Tim's gift aren't exactly hard and fast, and the final third of the film is rife with complications that never get quite explained. Rules that previously applied suddenly don't apply ... the time travel rules aren't exactly tight and are occasionally confusing". Megan Gibson, writing in Time magazine, said that science fiction fans would be put off by "gaping time-travel plot-holes", again suggesting that Tim's father's rules are repeatedly broken. Mark Kermode agreed that Curtis "sets up his rules of temporal engagement, only to break them willy-nilly whenever the prospect of an extra hug rears its head". Other critics who agreed include Steve Cummins of the Irish Post (the film is "riddled with plot holes"), Matthew Turner of View London (an "unsightly pile-up of plot holes and logic problems"), and Nicholas Barber from The Independent, who called the explanation of time travel "shockingly inadequate" and asserted that "Curtis keeps leaving questions unanswered – time and time again".

== Soundtrack ==
The soundtrack to the film was released on 3 September 2013 by Decca Records featured contemporary singles from artists include: the Cure, the Killers, Ellie Goulding, Amy Winehouse, Sugababes and Nick Cave, a new version of Ben Folds' song and Nick Laird-Clowes' score suite.

== See also ==
- List of films featuring time loops
- Reversi (2024), Malaysian film inspired from this movie
- The Time Traveler's Wife
