= The Wedding Diary =

- Directed by: Adrian Teh
- Starring: Ah Niu; Elanne Kong
- Production companies: Clover Films; Golden Screen Cinemas; Mega Cineplex; Asia Tropical Films
- Release date: 9 February 2012
- Running time: 111 minutes
- Country: Singapore
- Languages: English; Mandarin
- Budget: $1.2 million

The Wedding Diary (Chinese: 结婚那件事), is a 2012 Malaysian and Singaporean co-produced romantic comedy film directed by Adrian Teh.

== Plot ==
Malaysian engineer Daniel tries to throw a lavish wedding dinner in order to please the wealthy Singaporean family of his new wife, Tina.

== Cast ==
- Ah Niu as Daniel Chua Wei Keat
- Elanne Kong as Tina Chong Sze Xin
- Kara Wai as Allison Chan
- Zhu Houren as Collin Chong
- Shaun Chen as Jeremy
- Tong Bing Yu
- Maggie Teng

== Release ==
The film released in theatres in Singapore and Malaysia on 9 February 2012. The film had a successful theatrical run in both Malaysia and Singapore.

== Reception ==
=== Box office ===
The Wedding Diary earned RM$3.8 million in Malaysia and RM$1.4 million in Singapore.

=== Critical response ===
Chen Yunhong of Lianhe Wanbao rated the film three-and-a-half stars out of five. Boon Chan of The Straits Times rated the film one star out of five, calling the relationship between Daniel and Tina "unconvincing", and criticised the use of cliches and product placement.

== Sequel ==
Due to the good results of the box office takings, the production companies decide to film a sequel, The Wedding Diary II (结婚那件事之后), focusing on the lives of the couple raising their children. It was released in February 2013.
