= Ada Hantu =

2021 Malaysian horror film

- Directed by: Hairul Azreen
- Screenplay by: Adrian Teh; Amar Amir
- Story by: Adrian Teh
- Produced by: Adrian Teh
- Starring: Zahiril Adzim; Shiqin Kamal; Hairul Azreen; Nafiez Zaidi; Elvina Chua
- Cinematography: Danny Lala
- Edited by: Lee Pai Seang
- Production company: ACT 2 Pictures
- Distributed by: Disney+ Hotstar
- Release date: 13 August 2021
- Running time: 100 minutes
- Country: Malaysia
- Languages: Malay; English

Ada Hantu (English: There Are Ghosts) is a 2021 Malaysian Malay-language horror comedy film directed by Hairul Azreen. It tells the story of Aliff's unforgettable birthday celebration trip in an abandoned house previously occupied by Japanese Military. The film is the directorial debut of Azreen and was released on 13 August 2021 on Disney+ Hotstar.

== Synopsis ==
Five friends Aliff, Bariah, Talha, Sasha & Jimmy planned to celebrate ALIFF's birthday in a banglo left abandoned by Japanese Army. Aliff, a renowned YouTuber, gets excited about the idea despite being hesitant and scared.

As the night goes deep, Aliff feels more uncomfortable with the creepy atmosphere of the house. Several disturbances awoken him in the middle of the night. He is not aware these are the birthday pranks by his friends.

Aliff can't stand the fear and bolts towards the door, wanting to leave this haunted place, however, the chandelier in the living room drops and hits him. To everyone's surprise, Aliff is dead.

== Cast ==
- Zahiril Adzim as Aliff
- Shiqin Kamal as Bariah
- Hairul Azreen as Talha
- Nafiez Zaidi as Jimmy
- Elvina Chua as Sasha
- Sophia Albarakbah as Farah
- Theebaan G as Suresh
- Henley Hii as Peter
- Dafi Ismail Sabri as Amir
