= Hairul Azreen =

Malaysian actor, stuntman, fight choreographer and martial artist

- Born: Hairul Azreen bin Idris; 23 April 1988 (age 38); Kuala Lumpur, Malaysia
- Occupations: Actor; Stuntman; Martial artist; Model; Film director; Producer; Entrepreneur
- Years active: 2008–2023
- Spouse: Hanis Zalikha (m. 2015)
- Children: Yusuf Iskandar; Alisa Aisyah
- Parents: Idris Ali (father); Habsah Desa (mother)

Hairul Azreen Idris (born 23 April 1988) is a former Malaysian actor, stuntman, model, director, and entrepreneur. He began his career in the entertainment industry as a stuntman before becoming an active actor and was the Champion of Fear Factor Malaysia (Season 1) alongside Dazrin Kamarudin.

He has appeared in several television drama series, including Rona Roni Makaroni (2008), Ponti Anak Remaja (2010), Setia Hujung Nyawa (2013), and Misiku Kuza (2013–2014).

Among the films he has starred in are Hantu Kapcai (2012), Gila-Gila Remaja 2 (2013), Pak Pong (2017), PASKAL (2018), WIRA (2019), The Assistant (2022), and MALBATT: Misi Bakara (2023).

== Early life ==
Hairul Azreen was born on 23 April 1988 in Kuala Lumpur to his parents, Idris Ali and Habsah Desa. He is the second of four siblings. Hairul completed his education up to the Malaysian Certificate of Education (SPM) level. He studied Taekwondo, earning a black belt, and represented the Selangor contingent as an athlete at the 2004 Malaysia Games (SUKMA).

After finishing his SPM, in 2007, Hairul worked as a road painter on the Shah Alam Expressway (KESAS), earning RM50 per day. During this time, he faced the risk of being hit by speeding vehicles while painting road lines. He later switched jobs to become a car repossessor for individuals who failed to settle their bank payments. After that, he briefly worked as a watch salesman at Kuala Lumpur International Airport (KLIA).

== Personal life ==
He married actress, television host, and blogger Hanis Zalikha on 8 June 2015. Together with Hanis, they have been blessed with two children - a son, Yusuf Iskandar, born on 3 June 2016, and a daughter, Alisya Aisyah, born on 24 May 2019.

== Filmography ==
Key
Denotes film/dramas that have not yet been released

=== Film ===
Year	Title	Role	Notes
2011	Senario The Movie Ops Pocot	Maman	Debut film appearances
2012	Keramat	Nasti	
2012	Hantu Kapcai	Akim	
2013	Gila-Gila Remaja 2	Afiq	
2017	Pak Pong	Muda	
2017	Pencuri Hati Mr. Cinderella	Boy	
2018	Qhaliq	Qhaliq	
2018	PASKAL	Arman Rahmat / Jerung	
2018	Operasi X	Pablo	
2018	Polis Evo 2	Zul	
2019	Wira	Hassan	
2020	Pasal Kau!	Aiman	Also as executive producer and story
2021	Ada Hantu	Talha	Also as director and executive producer
2022	The Assistant	Feroz	
2022	Abang Long Fadil 3	Prison Officer	
2022	Ada Hantu 2	Talha	Also as director and executive producer
2023	MALBATT: Misi Bakara	Ismail	
2026	The Original Gangster	Que	Last film appearances as actor

=== Television series ===
Year	Title	Role	TV channel
2008	Rona Roni Makaroni	Boy	Astro Ria
2009	Bio-Nik	stand in stunt Kamal Adli	TV3
2009	Senandung Si Dayang	Tengku Muiz	TV3
2009	Merah Puteh	Beego	TV3
2009–2010	Jangan Pandang Belakang Congkak The Series	Ghafar	Astro Warna
2010	Mahabbah De Laila	Wa'ad	TV9
2010	Ponti Anak Remaja	Farid	Astro Ria
2011	Kali Kedua	Azmi	TV9
2011	Dingin Lavenda	Tajul	TV3
2011	Asmara 2	Fikri	TV3
2012	Sirrun	Khalid	TV9
2012	Indera Joned	Aiman	TV3
2012	Setia Hujung Nyawa	Ikram	TV3
2013	Anak Bertuah	Lokman	TV2
2013	5 Bujang	Tarmizi	TV1
2013–2014	Misiku Kuza	Airiel	Astro Ria
2014	Baby Ana Milik Siapa?	Reza	TV3
2015	Salam Dari Seoul	Aiman	TVi
2015	Merah Mawar Di Kundasang	Ashraf	TVi
2016	Dia Semanis Honey	Adam Hazrul	Astro Ria
2018	Pelangi Cinta	Rahman	TV3

=== Telemovie ===
Year	Title	Role	TV channel
2009	Siti Tivi		Astro Ria
2010	Fotokopi		TV2
2012	Korban Kasih	Imran	TV Alhijrah
2012	Pontianak Masih Beraya Di Kampung Batu	Kamil	Astro Ria
2013	Untuk Terakhir Kali	Shah	Astro Ria
2013	Banglo Seksyen 2	Helmi	Astro Ria
2013	Syawal Buat Abang	Rustam	TV Okey
2013	Awang Senandung	Awang	TV9
2013	Aku Bukan Buaya	Farell Redza	TV3
2014	Penunggu Bayang	Ariff	Astro Mustika HD
2014	Sayang Saranghae	Remy	TV Okey
2014	Diari Dewi	Adrian	TV9
2014	Ku Akui	Wafi	TV1
2014	Bermulanya Di Sini	Amir	TV Alhijrah
2015	Ibu Mummy Mama	Faiz	TV2
2015	Dalam Pelukan Ramadhan	Shah Eizlan	Astro Ria
2016	Jangan Ambil Botol Itu	Jamal	TV9
2016	Lara Cinta Qaseh		TV2
2021	Kain Kafan Berbisik	Muaz	TV2

== Videography ==
=== Music video ===
Year	Title	Singer
2011	"Cinta Muka Buku"	Najwa Latif

== Discography ==
Single
Year	Title
2014	"Semerah Mawar Merah"

== Retirement ==
On August 21, 2023, Hairul announced his retirement from acting after 15 years in the acting world. He made the announcement during the 3 Pagi Era segment and was witnessed by the radio presenters Radin and Azad Jasmin and guest presenters Linda Onn and Halim Othman.

His main reason for retiring from the world of acting is that he wants to focus on his family and business, even though MALBATT: Misi Bakara and The Original Gangster, were his last, and he hopes that both films will be his best memories.

== Awards and nominations ==
Year	Award	Category	Nominated work	Result
2008	Pencarian Kacak Bergaya 2008	3rd Place	—N/a	Won
2013	Fear Factor Selebriti Malaysia	1st Place Winner (with Dazrin Kamaruddin)	—N/a	Won
2016	3rd MeleTOP Era Awards	MeleTOP Couple	Hanis Zalikha & Hairul Azreen	Nominated
