= Eric Chen =

Chinese-American entrepreneur (born 1998)

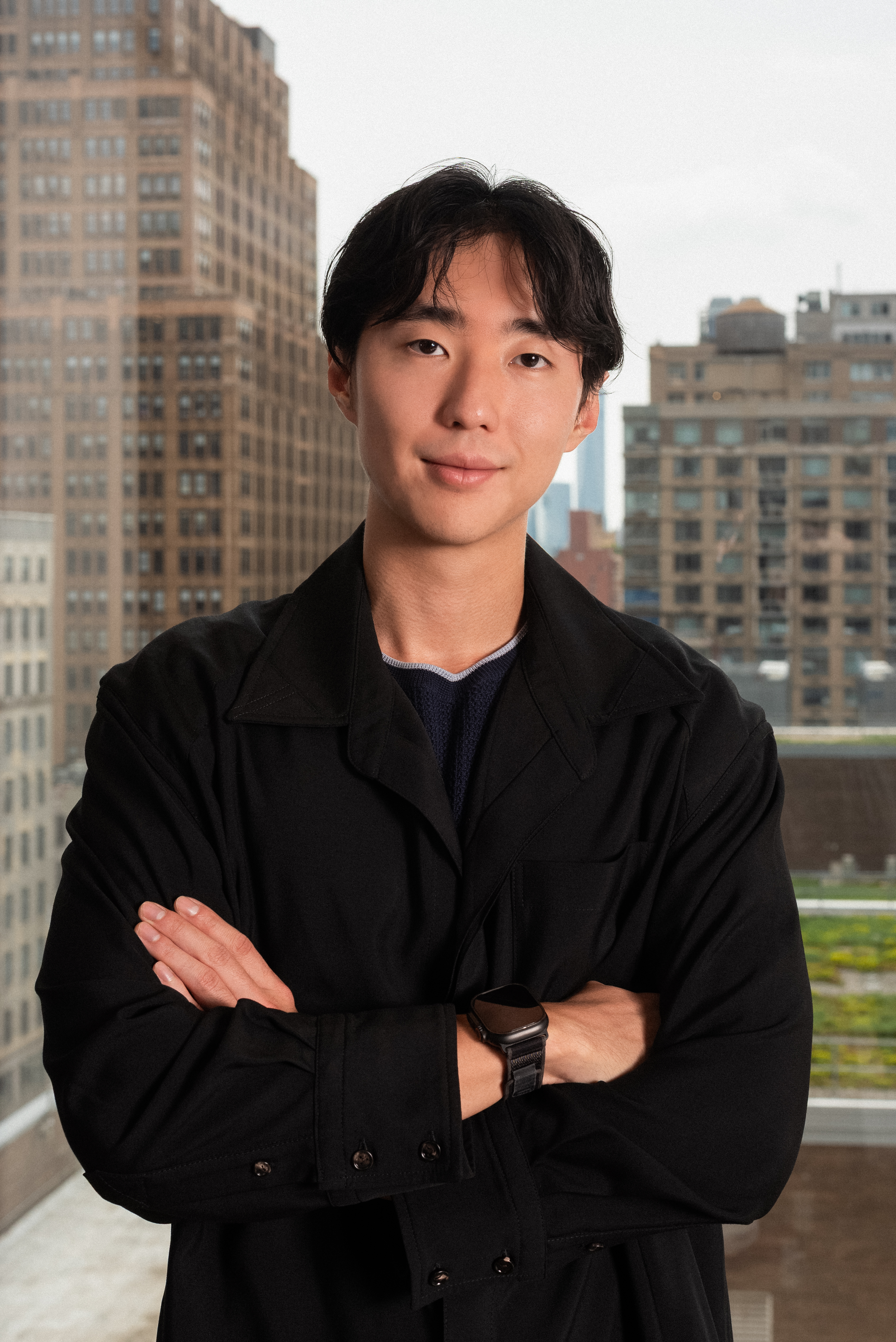
- Born: August 28, 1998 (age 28); China
- Education: New York University
- Occupations: Entrepreneur, blockchain developer
- Known for: Co-founder and CEO of Injective Labs

Eric Chen is an entrepreneur and blockchain developer. He is the co-founder and chief executive officer of Injective Labs, a blockchain technology company focused on decentralized finance.

== Education ==
Chen studied business and computer science at New York University (NYU). In a 2025 first-person account published by Business Insider, Chen described taking a leave of absence from the university in 2018 to pursue Injective. He subsequently left NYU without completing his degree.

== Career ==
In 2018, Chen and Albert Chon co-founded Injective Labs. In a 2025 interview with Inc., Chen described an email pitch to Mark Cuban that preceded Cuban's investment in Injective in 2021.

In 2018, Injective received $500,000 through the incubation program of Binance Labs, later renamed YZi Labs.

In July 2020, Injective announced a $2.6 million seed funding round led by Pantera Capital. Other participants included QCP Soteria, Axia8 Ventures, Boxone Ventures and Bitlink Capital.

In April 2021, Injective announced a $10 million private token sale that included Cuban and Pantera Capital.

In August 2022, Injective announced a $40 million private token sale led by Jump Crypto.

In 2026, Chen co-authored a paper with Petar Zhivkov in the journal Mathematics on transaction fee mechanisms for blockchains with block times below one second.

== Recognition ==
Chen and Chon were named to the Forbes 30 Under 30 Finance list for 2024 for their work on Injective.

== Media coverage ==
Chen has been profiled by Fortune and interviewed by Business Insider and Inc. He has also been covered by Benzinga.

Fortune has quoted Chen on prediction markets, CNBC on pre-IPO trading, and The Block on tokenized equities.

Chen has appeared on CNBC's Crypto World and Schwab Network's The Watch List.
