= Bakara, Nigeria =

Bakara is a populated place located in Nasarawa State, Nigeria. It is located approximately 24 kilometres (15 mi) southwest of Nasarawa city.
