= Lelio Popo =

- movie poster
- Directed by: Adrian Teh
- Starring: Benjamin Heng, Alaric Tay, Mindee Ong, Henry Thia
- Production company: Asia Tropical Films Sdn Bhd
- Distributed by: Golden Screen Cinemas; Cathay Karis Films; Clover Films
- Release dates: 2 December 2010 (Malaysia); 13 January 2011 (Singapore)
- Running time: 94 minutes
- Countries: Malaysia; Singapore
- Languages: Cantonese; Mandarin

Lelio Popo (Lit: Radio Grandma) is a Malaysia-Singaporean film directed by Adrian Teh. It was released in Malaysian cinemas on 2 December 2010 and in Singapore cinemas on 13 January 2011. Lelio Popo made an estimated 850,000 Singapore dollars at the box office.
