= King of Mahjong =

- Film poster
- Traditional Chinese: 麻雀王
- Simplified Chinese: 麻雀王
- Hanyu Pinyin: Má Què Wáng
- Jyutping: Maa4 Zeok3 Wong4
- Directed by: Adrian Teh
- Screenplay by: Lai Chaing-ming; Agn Siew-hoong; Ho You-wang
- Produced by: Allyan Too; Lim Teck
- Starring: Chapman To; Mark Lee; Michelle Ye; Venus Wong
- Cinematography: Yong Choon-lin
- Edited by: Keree Teh
- Production companies: Zingshot Productions; Rex Film Production; Luxury Watch Club; Across Solutions; Clover Films; Asia Tropical Films
- Distributed by: Clover Films; Cathay-Keris Films
- Release dates: 19 February 2015 (Singapore); 26 February 2015 (Malaysia); 21 May 2015 (Hong Kong)
- Countries: Singapore; Malaysia
- Languages: Cantonese; Mandarin
- Box office: RM$3 million (Malaysia); S$820,000 (Singapore); HK$36,648 (Hong Kong)

King of Mahjong is a 2015 Singaporean-Malaysian Chinese New Year comedy film directed by Adrian Teh and starring Chapman To, Mark Lee, Michelle Ye and Venus Wong. The film was theatrically released in Singapore on 19 February 2015 and in Malaysia on 26 February.

== Plot ==
Ah Fatt sells yong tofu while raising his daughter, Sassy Bai, content with his life, though concerned about Sassy's romantic prospects. Fatt encourages Sassy to give their neighbor, Wayne Yang – a teacher who is besotted with Sassy – a chance.

Meanwhile, Wong Tin-ba has been traveling and challenging Mahjong masters. He successfully gains titles until he is ready to challenge the one person who stands in his way of being the "King of Mahjong", which brings him to Fatt's door where Tin-ba issues the final challenge for the title of World Mahjong Master. Unbeknownst to Fatt's family, he was once a disciple of Master Ru, the King of Mahjong, alongside Tin-ba – who at the time was known as Zhang Shun-You.

Fatt isn't interested, though. While Sassy is upset at her father's decision, her mother Ramona returns, revealing that she has amnesia and that was why she left them when Sassy was little. To force Fatt's hand, Tin-ba kidnaps Ramona, holding her hostage to Fatt's participation in the tournament.

Fatt enters the tournament and, when facing Tin-ba, reveals that he knows Master Ru's secret winning move. It is during this final match that Tin-ba is finally able to relinquish his obsession with winning the title "King of Mahjong". Fatt, Ramona, and Sassy are reunited and reconcile.

== Cast ==
- Chapman To as Ah Fatt
- Mark Lee as Wong Tin-ba
- Michelle Ye as Ramona
- Venus Wong as Sassy Bai
- Eric Tsang as King Of Mahjong / Master Ru
- Adrian Tan as Wayne Yang
- Cheronna Ng (zh) as Deedee Cheung
- Richard Low as Tiger
- Patricia Mok as Nancy
- Dennis Chew as Ah Lian
- Lenna Lim (zh) as Icy

=== Guest appearance ===
- Tien Hsin
- Kingdom Yuen
- Lo Hoi-pang
- Mimi Chu
- Siu Yam-yam
- Henry Thia as Japanese Mahjong Master
- Hayley Woo as Chinese Mahjong Master
- Jayley Woo as Chinese Mahjong Master

== Production ==
King of Mahjong was filmed in both Singapore and Malaysia, with 80% of the filming on location in Ipoh. Directors chose the location because it provided both old houses and eateries, which were necessary for various scenes. Filming also took place in Kuala Lumpur.

Filming began on Sunday, 2014-08-03 in Malaysia. Filming in Ipoh began at 1 PM daily and continued until around 10 PM each night.

It was the first Singaporean-Malaysian film focused on the game of Mahjong set in the same era it was produced.

Zingshot Productions Pte Ltd fully funded the film. Production cost S$3.5 million (RM$8.96 million)

King of Mahjong is presented with characters speaking multiple languages (Singlish, Mandarin, and Cantonese) rather than dubbing and creating a singular language track.

== Themes ==
One of the concerns Adrian Teh addressed in the media leading up to the film's release related to the question of the movie potentially promoting gambling because of its inclusion of Mahjong as a central focus. Teh stated that the game as depicted in the film is about how the players bond instead.

== Release ==
The film premiered in Singapore on 2015-02-19, and in Malaysia on 2015-02-26. It premiered in Hong Kong on 2015-05-21. Distribution was handled by Clover Films of Singapore.

During the COVID-19 pandemic in Singapore, King of Mahjong was included in a collection for Netflix titled "Singapore, Now Streaming", and premiered on the streaming service on 2020-08-01.

== Reception ==
=== Box office ===
The film grossed RM$2.4 million at the box office after its first four days of release, leading the weekly box office. As of 6 March 2015, the film grossed RM$3 million. The report by the Infocomm Media Development Authority in 2017 showed the box office for King of Mahjong at S$820,000. The 2015 report from the Hong Kong Film Development Council shows the film had a box office of HK$36,648.

=== Critical reception ===
Gabriel Chong of Movie Exclusive rated the film 3.5 stars. Chong was impressed with To's performance, calling it "the film's biggest strength", and stating that the way he handles the reconciliation between Fatt and Ramona, as well as Ramona and Sassy, makes the scene more poignant. Chong also found Lee to be more of a detriment to the film, but attributed that to Teh's focus on Tin Ba's "narcissism". Chong lamented that To and Lee had so few scenes together, but noted that the humor in the film feels natural rather than scripted.

Thompson Wong of InCinemas.sg praised the choice to have a character-driven film rather than "mindless humor or fast-paced action". To that end, Wong was pleased that the Cantonese language track had been left intact rather than being dubbed over in Mandarin and losing nuance in the translation. Wong expressed disappointment with the pacing, yet noted that the lengthy scenes where the characters communicate helps keep the film from coming across as trite.
