= Amar Asyraf =

Malaysian actor

- أمر أشراف
- Born: Amar Asyraf Zailuddin; 15 November 1986 (age 39); Masjid Tanah, Melaka Malaysia
- Occupation: Actor
- Years active: 2011–present
- Spouse: Arna Salleh (m. 2013)

Amar Asyraf Zailuddin (born 15 November 1986) is a Malaysian actor. He had his debut in 2011, and has acted in dramas, films and television shows.

== Career ==
Amar's first film was Penunggu Istana in 2011, but his popularity grew after acting in Setia Hujung Nyawa as Zain Hakimi in 2012. After the end of this show, which gained him further fame, he continued acting in dramas, television dramas and also films. On 8 November 2015, he won the Best Actor Award for Drama Category in Anugerah Skrin 2015, a yearly award competition for filmmakers and drama makers in Malaysia.

== Early life ==
Amar was born on 15 November 1986, and origin from Masjid Tanah, Melaka Malaysia. Amar also graduate diploma in Art Directing and Acting from Akademi Seni Kebangsaan (the National Arts Academy) (Aswara).

== Personal life ==
Amar got engaged in 2011 to Arna Salleh after a relationship of 2 years. On 7 June 2013, Amar Asyraf married Arna Salleh.

== Filmography ==
=== Television series ===
Year	Title	Role	TV channel
2011	Nilapura	Rangga	TV3
2011	Kasih Najihah	Taufiq	TV9
2011	Dia Bukan Mariam		TV9
2011	Kitab Cinta		TV AlHijrah
2012	Psikik		RTM
2012	Pelangi I Love You		Astro Pelangi
2012	Dalam Hati Ada Taman	Danial	Astro Ria
2012	Rampas		Astro Ria
2012	Setia Hujung Nyawa	Zain Hakimi	TV3
2013	Duri Di Hati	Aliff	TV3
2017	Menantu Bilal	Rahim	TV3
2017	Encik Suami Mat Salih Celup		TV3
2019	Cikgu Papa Kirim Salam	Adam	TV3
2022	Perempuan Itu		TV3

=== Telemovie ===
Year	Title	Role	TV channel
2012	Patah Seribu		Astro Ria
2012	Hantu Susu Kembali	Usop	Astro Ria
2012	3 Jumaat Terakhir		TV3
2012	Aku Mahu Terbang	Syukur	TV3
2012	Janji Kita	Syafik	TV9
2012	Getaran Jiwa	Amy	RTM
2013	Setia Hujung Nyawa Raya	Zain Hakimi	TV3
2013	Sweet Lola	Zen	TV9
2013	Janin Emas	Amran	Astro Ria
2013	Ciptaan Terindah	Muhkriz	TV3
2013	Designer DD Naik Haji	Ustaz Khairi	RTM
2015	Jeritan Batinku	Remy	TV1
2016	Mencari Indah		TV9
2016	Gajet Mak Dah		TV9
2017	Perempuan Di Hujung Kampung	Umar Ariffin	TV9
2017	Ramadan Terindah Nurani	Rafiq	TV3
2017	Cinta Latah	Izat	TV2
2019	Jangan Salahkan Takdir	Muhammad	TV3

=== Film ===
Year	Title	Role	Notes
2011	Penunggu Istana	Amar	Film debut
2011	Qada'	Bakri	
2018	Blok 404	Hairi	
2020	Ratu Kala Jengking: Puteri Keranda	Hadim	
2020	Daulat	Saiful	
2022	Juang	Luqman	
2023	Escape	Hamzah	
