= Bakara =

Village in Al Anbar Governorate, Iraq

Bakara (also: Bakarah, al-Bakara) is a village in Iraq, which is located in Al Anbar Governorate north of the city of Fallujah, between the villages of Shiha and Albu Sudayrah to the west and Sajar to the south east.

In 2016, during the Siege of Fallujah and the following battle, there was intense fighting in the area between the Iraqi army and ISIL militants. On 28 May, Iraqi troops recaptured Bakara.
