= Wira (film) =

2019 Malaysian action film

- Film poster
- Directed by: Adrian Teh
- Screenplay by: Anwari Ashraf
- Story by: Adrian Teh
- Produced by: Adrian Teh
- Starring: Hairul Azreen; Fify Azmi; Ismi Melinda; Josiah Hogan; Yayan Ruhian; Dain Said; Henley Hii
- Cinematography: Yong Choon Lin
- Edited by: Lee Pai Seang
- Music by: Jackey Yow
- Production companies: Multimedia Entertainment; ACT 2 Pictures; Golden Screen Cinemas; Astro Shaw; Primeworks Studios
- Distributed by: GSC Movies (Malaysia); CBI PIctures (Indonesia); Netflix
- Release dates: November 21, 2019 (Malaysia & Singapore)
- Running time: 109 minutes
- Country: Malaysia
- Languages: Malay; English
- Budget: MYR 8 million
- Box office: MYR 7.6 million

Wira is a 2019 Malaysian action thriller film directed by Adrian Teh and written by Anwari Ashraf. The film follows Hassan, a former Malaysian Army commando who returns home and becomes embroiled in a conflict with a local crime boss after his family falls into debt.

== Plot ==
Former Malaysian Army lieutenant Hassan returns to his hometown to help his father, Munas, and sister, Zain, escape the grip of Raja, a local crime boss who runs a factory and an underground mixed martial arts operation. Zain owes Raja money after losing a fight to his daughter, Vee, leaving Hassan to settle the family's debt.

Raja agrees to settle the debt through a fight between Hassan and Zain and Raja's fighters, Vee and Rayyan. They win, but Vee and Rayyan attack them afterward. Rayyan is killed in the confrontation, while Hassan and Zain escape. Raja retaliates by having Munas burned alive, prompting Hassan to join his friend Boon, a police inspector, in an effort to bring Raja down.

Hassan and Zain discover that Raja is also involved in manufacturing and trafficking methamphetamine. After fighting their way through Raja's men, they confront Vee and Ifrit, Raja's chief of security. Zain defeats Vee, while Hassan kills Ifrit. Hassan then confronts Raja, who offers him control of his criminal operation. Hassan refuses, and Zain knocks Raja unconscious. Hassan surrenders to the police, while Zain subsequently joins the Royal Malaysian Air Force.

== Cast ==
=== Main cast ===
- Hairul Azreen as Hassan
- Fify Azmi as Zain
- Ismi Melinda as Vee
- Dato' Hilal Azman as Munas
- Dain Said as Raja
- Yayan Ruhian as Ifrit
- Henley Hii as Boon Hua
- Josiah Hogan as Rayyan
- Zizan Razak as Arson Thug 1
- Jack Lim as Arson Thug 2
- Azri Sabri as Nazmi

=== Other cast members ===
- Sam Chong as Alvin
- Hazzy Alzeeq as Pejal
- Zee Khan as Khatijah
- Kuew Teow
- Jude Jerry
- Fauzan
- Hassan Abdul Azeez
- Azzamuddin
- Farid Razali
- Alieshah Binti
- Mohd Kamaruzaman
- Trisha Ooi

=== Cameo appearances ===
- Namron as Commander Maznan
- Bront Palarae as Colenal Izzar

== Release ==
Wira was released theatrically in Malaysia and Singapore on 21 November 2019. The release coincided with Disney's animated film "Frozen 2," which opened the same day in Malaysia. "Ejen Ali The Movie," a Malaysian animated film produced by Primeworks Studios and WAU Animation, was released a week later on 28 November.

In Singapore, the film was rated PG-13 and opened at select cinemas. It was presented in Malay with English and Chinese subtitles and ran approximately 109 minutes. In Malaysia, it received a P13 rating and was distributed by GSC Movies.

The film also held an advance premiere screening at GSC Mid Valley in Kuala Lumpur on 12 November 2019, ahead of its nationwide theatrical release. According to contemporary coverage, director Adrian Teh and the cast promoted the film extensively before its release, and the production emphasized its large-scale action sequences and intensive martial-arts training.
