= Paskal (film) =

2018 Malaysian action film

PASKAL
- Theatrical release poster
- Directed by: Adrian Teh
- Screenplay by: Anwari Ashraf
- Story by: Adrian Teh; Keoh Chee Ang; Frank See
- Produced by: Keoh Chee Ang; Frank See
- Starring: Hairul Azreen; Ammar Alfian; Henley Hii
- Cinematography: Yong Choon Lin
- Edited by: Monster Than; Moray Toon
- Music by: Jackey Yow
- Production companies: Asia Tropical Films; Golden Screen Cinemas; Multimedia Entertainment; Granatum Ventures; Astro Shaw
- Distributed by: GSC Movies (Malaysia); Netflix
- Release date: 27 September 2018
- Running time: 115 minutes
- Country: Malaysia
- Languages: Malay; English; Mandarin; Somali; Portuguese
- Budget: MYR 10 million
- Box office: MYR 31.2 million

Paskal, stylized as PASKAL is a 2018 Malaysian war drama film directed by Adrian Teh and produced by Asia Tropical Films. It stars Hairul Azreen, Jasmine Suraya Chin, and Tiger Chen. It was inspired by the elite Royal Malaysian Navy (RMN) force named Naval Special Forces (Pasukan Khas Laut abbreviated as PASKAL). With a budget of RM10 million (US$2.4 million), PASKAL is one of the most expensive Malaysian film ever made.

Filming began in Kuala Lumpur from March to May 2018; its official premiere was on 27 September 2018. The film received positive critical reviews and it netted an overall profit of more than RM30 million across Malaysia and Singapore, making it one of the highest-grossing local films in Malaysia, following Munafik 2 and Hantu Kak Limah. In December 2018, PASKAL was listed by the local Malaysian newspaper Harian Metro as among the top 10 local films in Malaysian history.

== Plot ==
In 2018, Somali pirates hijack supertanker Laurel 11 at the Gulf of Aden one night. The Royal Malaysian Navy picks up the distress call and KA Bunga Mas Lima, bound for home after a long operation at sea, comes to aid. The pirates' refusal to negotiate prompted Commander Maznan to deploy the Navy's elite special operations unit, PASKAL, commanded by Lieutenant Commander Arman Rahmat. Two boats and a Super Lynx helicopter were deployed to capture the pirates.

The team returns to Lumut with Arman contemplating his retirement due to his mother's apparent distaste with his dangerous job and a traumatic past. Nine years earlier, when he was a sub-lieutenant, Arman was close friends with Joshua "Girang" Tee and Mohd. "Jeb" Zarif during training. His motivation to join PASKAL was to honour his father's sacrifice. The three of them were among the best in the unit and were selected to undergo advanced training course with US Navy SEALs. However, during a peacekeeping operation in Angola in 2011 to rescue Chinese Military Observer Chen Han, Joshua sacrifices himself to protect a woman from an enemy grenade. Wounded, Jeb was dishonourably discharged after brutally executing with a sidearm the surrendering rebel who killed Joshua. Joshua is later honored in a military funeral.

Arman takes care of Lily and Joshua's only son Joey. Despite handling his request to retire, Maznan enlists him on a reconnaissance mission in Kota Kinabalu as a "farewell party". He and his team are assigned to capture a pirate leader named Rudi Rusli Parjo, who was involved in the hijacking of MT Orkim Harmony. However, the plan was foiled after Arman spotted Jeb at a food court with Rudi, who had been recruiting ex-special forces members to his ranks in raids, and Jeb was recruited as his bodyguard.

Jeb's jealousy of Arman's achievements and apparent dislike with the Navy's system brings him at odds with Arman since training day, escalating when Jeb grows possessive of Lily. CCTV footage of Jeb's car shows a logo belonging to an oil rig company where Lily works, alerting Arman to a possible hijacking plot. He informs the Navy, who in turn alerted port authorities to lock down the rig. The fake security personnel team were captured by authorities, but Jeb and Rudi managed to escape. They eventually seized the oil rig, with Lily as one of the hostages.

Arman's team were recalled from leave and flown to the rendezvous point at sea before going to the rig by submarine with two back-up teams deployed aboard KD Selangor. After a change of plans, they dived towards the oil rig and secured the top to make way for reinforcements. Fighting past various traps and ambushes, Arman encounters Jeb with Lily bound to C-4 explosives. Jeb threatens to blow up the entire oil rig if Arman does not put his gun down. Arman complies, but Jeb threatens Arman with a knife, challenging him to see who is the better PASKAL. Rudi and another pirate were shot dead by Navy forces while attempting to escape through Filipino waters by boat, while Arman manages to subdue Jeb and throws him off the deck, still holding onto Jeb's hand. Refusing to accept defeat, Jeb fails to shoot Arman with his pistol, prompting him to drop Jeb overboard.

With all the hostages rescued and brought to shore, Arman's mother, finally understanding her son's sacrifice, acknowledges him and apologises, saying that his father would be proud if he was alive. Maznan awards honours to Arman and his team, and he laments about not knowing the full names of the members who he served with, to which chief petty officer Misi replies "How many kingdoms know nothing of us?" At a memorial site, Maznan reveals that Arman's father once served under him and told that his father's duty was a calling from God.

== Cast ==
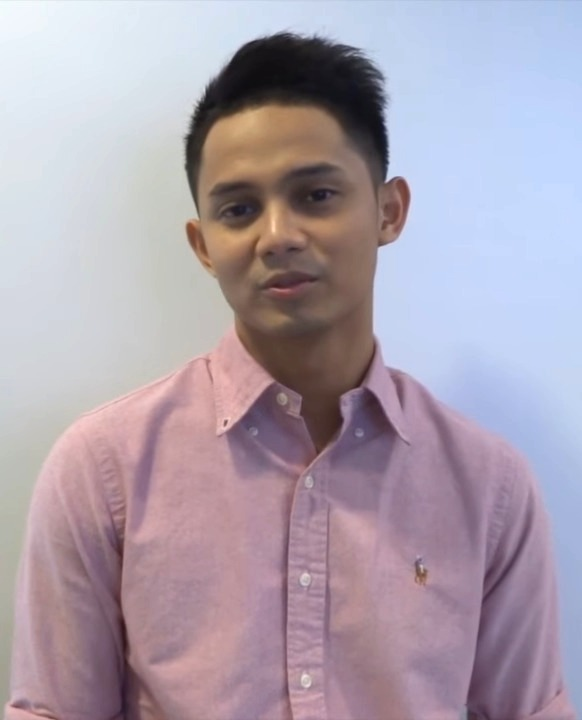
Hairul Azreen as Lieutenant Arman Rahmat

=== Principal cast ===
- Hairul Azreen as Lieutenant Commander Arman Rahmat RMN / Jerung

A born leader, Arman has the qualities of a true soldier. His late father once served under PASKAL with Commander Maznan and a subordinate of RMN commander. He is one of the best soldiers in his unit, earning him awards for his basic course.

- Ammar Alfian as Mohd. Zarif bin Zafrudin / Jeb

A stronger, muscular man who reaps rewards based on his skills. Jeb's erratic and aggressive behaviour was portrayed early in basic training and his jealousy of Arman grew stronger. After being fired from PASKAL, he worked as a mercenary for Rudi.

- Henley Hii as Lieutenant Joshua Tee Seng Wai RMN / Girang

A previous close friend to Arman and a Chinese-Malaysian PASKAL commando. He is married to Lily and had a son.

- Taufiq Hanafi as Lieutenant Khairil Fikri bin Abdul Musa RMN / Ustad served as Arman's second-in-command and follows the teachings of Islam to heart.
- Gambit Saifullah as Petty Officer (Bintara Muda) Adam Ashraf bin Hanafi / Gagak served as the team's designated marksman.
- Hafizul Kamal as Petty Officer (Bintara Muda) Imran Tamrin bin Radzi / Yan
- Theebaan G as Chief Petty Officer (Bintara Kanan) Shailesh Marimuthu / Misi. An officer who spends his time reading books.
- Jasmine Suraya Chin as Lily, Joshua's wife.
- Namron as Commander Maznan RMN
- Sherry Aljeffri as Khadijah
- Amerul Affendi as Rudi Rusli Parjo, a pirate leader involved in the hijacking of MT Orkim Harmony
- Dato' Sri Eizlan Yusof as Vice Admiral Kamarul RMN commander
- Sam Loo as Zero, a Chinese-Malaysian PASKAL commando on Arman's team
- Lucas Chua as Polar / Bravo One, a Chinese-Malaysian PASKAL commando on Arman's team
- Adi Afendi as Captain Michael, commanding officer of the MT Bunga Laurel II

=== Cameo / Special appearances ===
- Tiger Chen as Sergeant Chen Han, a UN Mainland China Observer in Angola rescued by Arman's team
- Jason Solomon John as Super Lynx pilot,in real life he was involved Operation Fajar with Eurocopter AS355 Écureuil 2
- Steven Yap as Boon, an engineer on the MT Bunga Laurel II
- Adrian Teh as Captain Stanley, commanding officer of the KD Selangor
- Keoh Chee Ang as Security guard
- Noor Asri Roslan as Aide of RMN commander and in real life he was involved in Operation Fajar
- Fabian Loo as Wai, Lily's friend and co-worker on the oil rig

== Production ==
PASKAL was directed by Adrian Teh. It is based on actual events of the Royal Malaysian Navy's Special Forces Team during the United Nations peacekeeping mission in Angola in 1998, and the successful rescue of the hijacked MV Bunga Laurel trade vessel in 2011. The cost of filming was about RM10 million. The shooting was conducted at several locations within and outside of Malaysia, including Lumut, Semporna, and Istanbul, Turkey.
